= List of Topps All-Star Rookie teams =

Topps All-Star Rookie teams
- Type: Baseball card
- Company: Topps
- Country: United States
- Availability: 1959–present
- Features: MLB rookie players

This is a year-by-year list of Topps All-Star Rookie Teams. Note that players selected for a particular team appear in the following year's set release. So, a player named to the 2023 Topps All-Star Rookie team will have a trophy symbol on his 2024 Topps baseball card.

†	Member of the National Baseball Hall of Fame and Museum

== 1950s ==
1959

- Johnny Romano, C, Chicago White Sox
- Willie McCovey, 1B, San Francisco Giants †
- Pumpsie Green, 2B, Boston Red Sox
- Jim Baxes, 3B, Cleveland Indians
- Joe Koppe, SS, Philadelphia Phillies
- Bob Allison, OF, Washington Senators
- Ron Fairly, OF, Los Angeles Dodgers
- Willie Tasby, OF, Baltimore Orioles
- Jim Perry, RHP, Cleveland Indians
- Jim O'Toole, LHP, Cincinnati Reds

== 1960s ==
1960

- Jimmie Coker, C, Philadelphia Phillies
- Jim Gentile, 1B, Baltimore Orioles
- Julián Javier, 2B, St. Louis Cardinals
- Ron Santo, 3B, Chicago Cubs †
- Ron Hansen, SS, Baltimore Orioles
- Tony Curry, OF, Philadelphia Phillies
- Tommy Davis, OF, Los Angeles Dodgers
- Frank Howard, OF, Los Angeles Dodgers
- Chuck Estrada, RHP, Baltimore Orioles
- Dick Stigman, LHP, Cleveland Indians

1961

- Joe Torre, C, Milwaukee Braves † (as a manager)
- J. C. Martin, 1B, Chicago White Sox
- Jake Wood, 2B, Detroit Tigers
- Charley Smith, 3B, Chicago White Sox
- Dick Howser, SS, Kansas City Athletics
- Floyd Robinson, OF, Chicago White Sox
- Lee Thomas, OF, Los Angeles Angels
- Billy Williams, OF, Chicago Cubs †
- Don Schwall, RHP, Boston Red Sox
- Jack Curtis, LHP, Chicago Cubs

1962

- Bob Rodgers, C, Los Angeles Angels
- Fred Whitfield, 1B, Cleveland Indians
- Bernie Allen, 2B, Minnesota Twins
- Ed Charles, 3B, Kansas City Athletics
- Tom Tresh, SS, New York Yankees
- Manny Jiménez, OF, Kansas City Athletics
- Al Luplow, OF, Cleveland Indians
- Boog Powell, OF, Baltimore Orioles
- Dean Chance, RHP, Los Angeles Angels
- Al Jackson, LHP, New York Mets

1963

- Jesse Gonder, C, New York Mets
- Rusty Staub, 1B, Houston Colt .45's
- Pete Rose, 2B, Cincinnati Reds
- Pete Ward, 3B, Chicago White Sox
- Al Weis, SS, Chicago White Sox
- Vic Davalillo, OF, Cleveland Indians
- Jimmie Hall, OF, Minnesota Twins
- Tommy Harper, OF, Cincinnati Reds
- Ray Culp, RHP, Philadelphia Phillies
- Gary Peters, LHP, Chicago White Sox

1964

- Mike Brumley, C, Washington Senators
- Bob Chance, 1B, Washington Senators
- Hal Lanier, 2B, San Francisco Giants
- Richie Allen, 3B, Philadelphia Phillies †
- Bert Campaneris, SS, Kansas City Athletics
- Rico Carty, OF, Milwaukee Braves
- Tony Conigliaro, OF, Boston Red Sox
- Tony Oliva, OF, Minnesota Twins †
- Wally Bunker, RHP, Baltimore Orioles
- Bill McCool, LHP, Cincinnati Reds

1965

- Pat Corrales, C, St. Louis Cardinals
- Tony Pérez, 1B, Cincinnati Reds †
- Joe Morgan, 2B, Houston Astros †
- Paul Schaal, 3B, California Angels
- Rico Petrocelli, SS, Boston Red Sox
- Curt Blefary, OF, Baltimore Orioles
- José Cardenal, OF, California Angels
- Ron Swoboda, OF, New York Mets
- Frank Linzy, RHP, San Francisco Giants
- Marcelino López, LHP, California Angels

1966

- Randy Hundley, C, Chicago Cubs
- George Scott, 1B, Boston Red Sox
- Davey Johnson, 2B, Baltimore Orioles
- Tommy Helms, 3B, Cincinnati Reds
- Sonny Jackson, SS, Houston Astros
- Tommie Agee, OF, Chicago White Sox
- Byron Browne, OF, Chicago Cubs
- Cleon Jones, OF, New York Mets
- Jim Nash, RHP, Kansas City Athletics
- Woodie Fryman, LHP, Pittsburgh Pirates

1967

- Dick Dietz, C, San Francisco Giants
- Lee May, 1B, Cincinnati Reds
- Rod Carew, 2B, Minnesota Twins †
- Bobby Etheridge, 3B, San Francisco Giants
- Tim Cullen, SS, Washington Senators
- Rick Monday, OF, Oakland Athletics
- Reggie Smith, OF, Boston Red Sox
- Walt Williams, OF Chicago White Sox
- Dick Hughes, RHP, St. Louis Cardinals
- Tom Seaver, RHP, New York Mets †
- Rich Nye, LHP, Chicago Cubs

1968

- Johnny Bench, C, Cincinnati Reds †
- Gary Holman, 1B, Washington Senators
- Dave Nelson, 2B, Cleveland Indians
- Ken Boswell, 2B, New York Mets
- Bobby Cox, 3B, New York Yankees † (as a manager)
- Héctor Torres, SS, Houston Astros
- Bobby Bonds, OF, San Francisco Giants
- Dave Marshall, OF, San Francisco Giants
- Del Unser, OF, Washington Senators
- Stan Bahnsen, RHP, New York Yankees
- Jerry Koosman, LHP, New York Mets

1969

- Bob Didier, C, Atlanta Braves
- Al Oliver, 1B, Pittsburgh Pirates
- Ted Sizemore, 2B, Los Angeles Dodgers
- Coco Laboy, 3B, Montreal Expos
- Don Money, SS, Philadelphia Phillies
- Larry Hisle, OF, Philadelphia Phillies
- Carlos May, OF, Chicago White Sox
- Lou Piniella, OF, Kansas City Royals
- Mike Nagy, RHP, Boston Red Sox
- Bill Butler, LHP, Kansas City Royals

== 1970s ==
1970

- Thurman Munson, C, New York Yankees
- John Ellis, 1B, New York Yankees
- Dave Cash, 2B, Pittsburgh Pirates
- Al Gallagher, 3B, San Francisco Giants
- Larry Bowa, SS, Philadelphia Phillies
- Bernie Carbo, OF, Cincinnati Reds
- Billy Conigliaro, OF, Boston Red Sox
- Roy Foster, OF, Cleveland Indians
- Carl Morton, RHP, Montreal Expos
- Les Cain, LHP, Detroit Tigers

1971

- Earl Williams, C, Atlanta Braves
- Chris Chambliss, 1B, Cleveland Indians
- Doug Griffin, 2B, Boston Red Sox
- Steve Braun, 3B, Minnesota Twins
- Chris Speier, SS, San Francisco Giants
- Bill Buckner, OF, Los Angeles Dodgers
- Ángel Mangual, OF, Oakland Athletics
- Willie Montañez, OF, Philadelphia Phillies
- Bill Parsons, RHP, Milwaukee Brewers
- Ross Grimsley, LHP, Cincinnati Reds

1972

- Carlton Fisk, C, Boston Red Sox †
- Tom Hutton, 1B, Philadelphia Phillies
- Jack Brohamer, 2B, Cleveland Indians
- Dave Roberts, 3B, San Diego Padres
- Dwain Anderson, SS, St. Louis Cardinals
- Don Baylor, OF, Baltimore Orioles
- Buddy Bell, OF, Cleveland Indians
- Garry Maddox, OF, San Francisco Giants
- Dick Tidrow, RHP, Cleveland Indians
- Jon Matlack, LHP, New York Mets

1973

- Bob Boone, C, Philadelphia Phillies
- Gary Thomasson, 1B, San Francisco Giants
- Dave Lopes, 2B, Los Angeles Dodgers
- Dan Driessen, 3B, Cincinnati Reds
- Jerry Terrell, SS, Minnesota Twins
- Rich Coggins, OF, Baltimore Orioles
- Johnny Grubb, OF, San Diego Padres
- Gary Matthews, OF, San Francisco Giants
- Steve Rogers, RHP, Montreal Expos
- Randy Jones, LHP, San Diego Padres

1974

- Barry Foote, C, Montreal Expos
- Mike Hargrove, 1B, Texas Rangers
- Larry Milbourne, 2B, Houston Astros
- Bill Madlock, 3B, Chicago Cubs
- Bucky Dent, SS, Chicago White Sox
- Greg Gross, OF, Houston Astros
- Bake McBride, OF, St. Louis Cardinals
- Claudell Washington, OF, Oakland Athletics
- John D'Acquisto, RHP, San Francisco Giants
- Frank Tanana, LHP, California Angels

1975

- Gary Carter, C, Montreal Expos†
- Mike Ivie, 1B, San Diego Padres
- Jerry Remy, 2B, California Angels
- Larry Parrish, 3B, Montreal Expos
- Tom Veryzer, SS, Detroit Tigers
- Dan Ford, OF, Minnesota Twins
- Fred Lynn, OF, Boston Red Sox
- Jim Rice, OF, Boston Red Sox †
- John Montefusco, RHP, San Francisco Giants
- Tom Underwood, LHP, Philadelphia Phillies

1976

- Butch Wynegar, C, Minnesota Twins
- Jason Thompson, 1B, Detroit Tigers
- Willie Randolph, 2B, New York Yankees
- Jerry Royster, 3B, Atlanta Braves
- Garry Templeton, SS, St. Louis Cardinals
- Larry Herndon, OF, San Francisco Giants
- Chet Lemon, OF, Chicago White Sox
- Tom Poquette, OF, Kansas City Royals
- Mark Fidrych, RHP, Detroit Tigers
- Jerry Augustine, LHP, Milwaukee Brewers

1977

- Gary Alexander, C, San Francisco Giants
- Doug Ault, 1B, Toronto Blue Jays
- Bump Wills, 2B, Texas Rangers
- Wayne Gross, 3B, Oakland Athletics
- Bob Bailor, SS, Toronto Blue Jays
- Andre Dawson, OF, Montreal Expos †
- Ruppert Jones, OF, Seattle Mariners
- Mitchell Page, OF, Oakland Athletics
- Dave Rozema, RHP, Detroit Tigers
- Jerry Garvin, LHP, Toronto Blue Jays
- Eddie Murray, DH, Baltimore Orioles †

1978

- Bill Nahorodny, C, Chicago White Sox
- Dave Revering, 1B, Oakland Athletics
- Paul Molitor, 2B, Milwaukee Brewers †
- Bob Horner, 3B, Atlanta Braves
- Ozzie Smith, SS, San Diego Padres †
- Rick Bosetti, OF, Toronto Blue Jays
- Bob Molinaro, OF, Chicago White Sox
- Hosken Powell, OF, Minnesota Twins
- Rich Gale, RHP, Kansas City Royals
- John Johnson, LHP, Oakland Athletics

1979

- Steve Nicosia, C, Pittsburgh Pirates
- Pat Putnam, 1B, Texas Rangers
- Danny Ainge, 2B, Toronto Blue Jays
- John Castino, 3B, Minnesota Twins
- Alfredo Griffin, SS, Toronto Blue Jays
- Jeff Leonard, OF, Houston Astros
- Billy Sample, OF, Texas Rangers
- Scot Thompson, OF, Chicago Cubs
- Mark Clear, RHP, California Angels
- Ross Baumgarten, LHP, Chicago White Sox

== 1980s ==
1980

- Dan Graham, C, Baltimore Orioles
- Rich Murray, 1B, San Francisco Giants
- Damaso Garcia, 2B, Toronto Blue Jays
- Glenn Hoffman, 3B, Boston Red Sox
- Ron Oester, SS, Cincinnati Reds
- Joe Charboneau, OF, Cleveland Indians
- Rick Peters, OF, Detroit Tigers
- Lonnie Smith, OF, Philadelphia Phillies
- Doug Corbett, RHP, Minnesota Twins
- Britt Burns, LHP, Chicago White Sox

1981

- Tony Peña, C, Pittsburgh Pirates
- Tim Wallach, 1B, Montreal Expos
- Juan Bonilla, 2B, San Diego Padres
- Hubie Brooks, 3B, New York Mets
- Cal Ripken Jr., SS, Baltimore Orioles †
- Rufino Linares, OF, Atlanta Braves
- Tim Raines, OF, Montreal Expos †
- Mookie Wilson, OF, New York Mets
- Bruce Berenyi, RHP, Cincinnati Reds
- Fernando Valenzuela, LHP, Los Angeles Dodgers

1982

- Tim Laudner, C, Minnesota Twins
- Kent Hrbek, 1B, Minnesota Twins
- Steve Sax, 2B, Los Angeles Dodgers
- Ryne Sandberg, 3B, Chicago Cubs †
- Cal Ripken Jr., SS, Baltimore Orioles †
- Tom Brunansky, OF, Minnesota Twins
- Chili Davis, OF, San Francisco Giants
- Willie McGee, OF, St. Louis Cardinals
- Bill Laskey, RHP, San Francisco Giants
- Ed Vande Berg, LHP, Seattle Mariners

1983

- Bob Kearney, C, Oakland Athletics
- Greg Brock, 1B, Los Angeles Dodgers
- Bill Doran, 2B, Houston Astros
- Nick Esasky, 3B, Cincinnati Reds
- Julio Franco, SS, Cleveland Indians
- Mel Hall, OF, Chicago Cubs
- Ron Kittle, OF, Chicago White Sox
- Darryl Strawberry, OF, New York Mets
- Mike Boddicker, RHP, Baltimore Orioles
- Matt Young, LHP, Seattle Mariners

1984

- Mike Fitzgerald, C, New York Mets
- Alvin Davis, 1B, Seattle Mariners
- Juan Samuel, 2B, Philadelphia Phillies
- Brook Jacoby, 3B, Cleveland Indians
- Jackie Gutiérrez, SS, Boston Red Sox
- Dan Gladden, OF, San Francisco Giants
- Carmelo Martínez, OF, San Diego Padres
- Kirby Puckett, OF, Minnesota Twins †
- Dwight Gooden, RHP, New York Mets
- Mark Langston, LHP, Seattle Mariners

1985

- Mark Salas, C, Minnesota Twins
- Glenn Davis, 1B, Houston Astros
- Ernest Riles, 2B, Milwaukee Brewers
- Chris Brown, 3B, San Francisco Giants
- Ozzie Guillén, SS, Chicago White Sox
- Vince Coleman, OF, St. Louis Cardinals
- Oddibe McDowell, OF, Texas Rangers
- Larry Sheets, OF, Baltimore Orioles
- Brian Fisher, RHP, New York Yankees
- Roger McDowell, RHP, New York Mets
- Tom Browning, LHP, Cincinnati Reds

1986

- Andy Allanson, C, Cleveland Indians
- Wally Joyner, 1B, California Angels
- Robby Thompson, 2B, San Francisco Giants
- Dale Sveum, 3B, Milwaukee Brewers
- Andrés Thomas, SS, Atlanta Braves
- José Canseco, OF, Oakland Athletics
- Pete Incaviglia, OF, Texas Rangers
- Cory Snyder, OF, Cleveland Indians
- Danny Tartabull, OF, Seattle Mariners
- Todd Worrell, RHP, St. Louis Cardinals
- Bruce Ruffin, LHP, Philadelphia Phillies

1987

- Matt Nokes, C, Detroit Tigers
- Mark McGwire, 1B, Oakland Athletics
- Casey Candaele, 2B, Montreal Expos
- Kevin Seitzer, 3B, Kansas City Royals
- Al Pedrique, SS, Pittsburgh Pirates
- Ellis Burks, OF, Boston Red Sox
- Mike Greenwell, OF, Boston Red Sox
- Devon White, OF, California Angels
- Mike Dunne, RHP, Pittsburgh Pirates
- Jeff Musselman, LHP, Toronto Blue Jays

1988

- Damon Berryhill, C, Chicago Cubs
- Mark Grace, 1B, Chicago Cubs
- Ron Gant, 2B, Atlanta Braves
- Chris Sabo, 3B, Cincinnati Reds
- Walt Weiss, SS, Oakland Athletics
- Jay Buhner, OF, Seattle Mariners
- Cecil Espy, OF, Texas Rangers
- Dave Gallagher, OF, Chicago White Sox
- Tim Belcher, RHP, Los Angeles Dodgers
- Paul Gibson, LHP, Detroit Tigers

1989

- Bob Geren, C, New York Yankees
- Carlos Martínez, 1B, Chicago White Sox
- Gregg Jefferies, 2B, New York Mets
- Craig Worthington, 3B, Baltimore Orioles
- Gary Sheffield, SS, Milwaukee Brewers
- Greg Briley, OF, Seattle Mariners
- Ken Griffey Jr., OF, Seattle Mariners †
- Jerome Walton, OF, Chicago Cubs
- Tom Gordon, RHP, Kansas City Royals
- Jim Abbott, LHP, California Angels

== 1990s ==
1990

- Sandy Alomar Jr., C, Cleveland Indians
- Hal Morris, 1B, Cincinnati Reds
- Delino DeShields, 2B, Montreal Expos
- Robin Ventura, 3B, Chicago White Sox
- Jeff Huson, SS, Texas Rangers
- Félix José, OF, St. Louis Cardinals
- David Justice, OF, Atlanta Braves
- Larry Walker, OF, Montreal Expos †
- Kevin Appier, RHP, Kansas City Royals
- Scott Radinsky, LHP, Chicago White Sox

1991

- Iván Rodríguez, C, Texas Rangers †
- Jeff Bagwell, 1B, Houston Astros †
- Chuck Knoblauch, 2B, Minnesota Twins
- Leo Gómez, 3B, Baltimore Orioles
- Andújar Cedeño, SS, Houston Astros
- Milt Cuyler, OF, Detroit Tigers
- Luis González, OF, Houston Astros
- Ray Lankford, OF, St. Louis Cardinals
- Mark Leiter, RHP, Detroit Tigers
- Al Osuna, LHP, Houston Astros

1992

- Todd Hundley, C, New York Mets
- Eric Karros, 1B, Los Angeles Dodgers
- Jeff Kent, 2B, New York Mets †
- Scott Livingstone, 3B, Detroit Tigers
- Pat Listach, SS, Milwaukee Brewers
- Moisés Alou, OF, Montreal Expos
- Kenny Lofton, OF, Cleveland Indians
- Reggie Sanders, OF, Cincinnati Reds
- Cal Eldred, RHP, Milwaukee Brewers
- Dave Fleming, LHP, Seattle Mariners

1993

- Mike Piazza, C, Los Angeles Dodgers †
- J. T. Snow, 1B, California Angels
- Carlos García, 2B, Pittsburgh Pirates
- Mike Lansing, 3B, Montreal Expos
- Wil Cordero, SS, Montreal Expos
- Jeff Conine, OF, Florida Marlins
- Wayne Kirby, OF, Cleveland Indians
- Tim Salmon, OF, California Angels
- Greg McMichael, RHP, Atlanta Braves
- Steve Cooke, LHP, Pittsburgh Pirates

1994

- Javy López, C, Atlanta Braves
- Bob Hamelin, 1B, Kansas City Royals
- John Patterson, 2B, San Francisco Giants
- José Oliva, 3B, Atlanta Braves
- Chris Gomez, SS, Detroit Tigers
- Ryan Klesko, OF, Atlanta Braves
- Raúl Mondesí, OF, Los Angeles Dodgers
- Manny Ramírez, OF, Cleveland Indians
- Joey Hamilton, RHP, San Diego Padres
- Brian Anderson, LHP, California Angels

1995

- Charles Johnson, C, Florida Marlins
- John Mabry, 1B, St. Louis Cardinals
- Ray Durham, 2B, Chicago White Sox
- Chipper Jones, 3B, Atlanta Braves †
- Orlando Miller, SS, Houston Astros
- Garret Anderson, OF, California Angels
- Marty Cordova, OF, Minnesota Twins
- Shawn Green, OF, Toronto Blue Jays
- Hideo Nomo, RHP, Los Angeles Dodgers
- Carlos Perez, LHP, Montreal Expos

1996

- Jason Kendall, C, Pittsburgh Pirates
- Tony Clark, 1B, Detroit Tigers
- Tony Batista, 2B, Oakland Athletics
- Joe Randa, 3B, Kansas City Royals
- Derek Jeter, SS, New York Yankees †
- Jermaine Dye, OF, Atlanta Braves
- Todd Hollandsworth, OF, Los Angeles Dodgers
- F. P. Santangelo, OF, Montreal Expos
- Alan Benes, RHP, St. Louis Cardinals
- Billy Wagner, LHP, Houston Astros †

1997

- Scott Hatteberg, C, Boston Red Sox
- Dmitri Young, 1B, St. Louis Cardinals
- Wilton Guerrero, 2B, Los Angeles Dodgers
- Scott Rolen, 3B, Philadelphia Phillies †
- Nomar Garciaparra, SS, Boston Red Sox
- José Cruz Jr., OF, Toronto Blue Jays
- José Guillén, OF, Pittsburgh Pirates
- Andruw Jones, OF, Atlanta Braves †
- Jason Dickson, RHP, Anaheim Angels
- Mike Holtz, LHP, Anaheim Angels

1998

- A. J. Hinch, C, Oakland Athletics
- Todd Helton, 1B, Colorado Rockies †
- Miguel Cairo, 2B, Tampa Bay Devil Rays
- Bob Smith, 3B, Tampa Bay Devil Rays
- Mike Caruso, SS, Chicago White Sox
- Ben Grieve, OF, Oakland Athletics
- Mark Kotsay, OF, Florida Marlins
- Magglio Ordóñez, OF, Chicago White Sox
- Kerry Wood, RHP, Chicago Cubs
- Jesús Sánchez, LHP, Florida Marlins

1999

- Ben Davis, C, San Diego Padres
- Brian Daubach, 1B, Boston Red Sox
- Warren Morris, 2B, Pittsburgh Pirates
- Corey Koskie, 3B, Minnesota Twins
- Álex González, SS, Florida Marlins
- Carlos Beltrán, OF, Kansas City Royals †
- Chris Singleton, OF, Chicago White Sox
- Preston Wilson, OF, Florida Marlins
- Billy Koch, RHP, Toronto Blue Jays
- John Halama, LHP, Seattle Mariners

== 2000s ==
2000

- Bengie Molina, C, Anaheim Angels
- Pat Burrell, 1B, Philadelphia Phillies
- Adam Kennedy, 2B, Anaheim Angels
- Mike Lamb, 3B, Texas Rangers
- Rafael Furcal, SS, Atlanta Braves
- Terrence Long, OF, Oakland Athletics
- Jay Payton, OF, New York Mets
- Mark Quinn, OF, Kansas City Royals
- Kazuhiro Sasaki, RHP, Seattle Mariners
- Mark Redman, LHP, Minnesota Twins

2001

- Shawn Wooten, C, Anaheim Angels
- Craig Wilson, 1B, Pittsburgh Pirates
- Alfonso Soriano, 2B, New York Yankees
- Albert Pujols, 3B, St. Louis Cardinals
- Jimmy Rollins, SS, Philadelphia Phillies
- Adam Dunn, OF, Cincinnati Reds
- Tsuyoshi Shinjo, OF, New York Mets
- Ichiro Suzuki, OF, Seattle Mariners †
- Roy Oswalt, RHP, Houston Astros
- CC Sabathia, LHP, Cleveland Indians †

2002

- Gerónimo Gil, C, Baltimore Orioles
- Nick Johnson, 1B, New York Yankees
- Mark Ellis, 2B, Oakland Athletics
- Eric Hinske, 3B, Toronto Blue Jays
- Ramón Santiago, SS, Detroit Tigers
- Austin Kearns, OF, Cincinnati Reds
- Alex Sánchez, OF, Milwaukee Brewers
- Brad Wilkerson, OF, Montreal Expos
- Jason Jennings, RHP, Colorado Rockies
- Damian Moss, LHP, Atlanta Braves

2003

- Miguel Olivo, C, Chicago White Sox
- Mark Teixeira, 1B, Texas Rangers
- Bo Hart, 2B, St. Louis Cardinals
- Ty Wigginton, 3B, New York Mets
- Ángel Berroa, SS, Kansas City Royals
- Rocco Baldelli, OF, Tampa Bay Devil Rays
- Jody Gerut, OF, Cleveland Indians
- Scott Podsednik, OF, Milwaukee Brewers
- Brandon Webb, RHP, Arizona Diamondbacks
- Dontrelle Willis, LHP, Florida Marlins

2004

- Joe Mauer, C, Minnesota Twins †
- Adam LaRoche, 1B, Atlanta Braves
- Aaron Miles, 2B, Colorado Rockies
- Chad Tracy, 3B, Arizona Diamondbacks
- Khalil Greene, SS, San Diego Padres
- Jason Bay, OF, Pittsburgh Pirates (unanimous selection)
- Matt Holliday, OF, Colorado Rockies
- Terrmel Sledge, OF, Montreal Expos
- Daniel Cabrera, RHP, Baltimore Orioles
- Mike Gonzalez, LHP, Pittsburgh Pirates

2005

- Brian McCann, C, Atlanta Braves
- Dan Johnson, 1B, Oakland Athletics (unanimous selection)
- Tadahito Iguchi, 2B, Chicago White Sox
- Garrett Atkins, 3B, Colorado Rockies (unanimous selection)
- Russ Adams, SS, Toronto Blue Jays (unanimous selection)
- Jeff Francoeur, OF, Atlanta Braves
- Jonny Gomes, OF, Tampa Bay Devil Rays
- Willy Taveras, OF, Houston Astros
- Huston Street, RHP, Oakland Athletics (unanimous selection)
- Gustavo Chacín, LHP, Toronto Blue Jays (unanimous selection)

2006

- Russell Martin, C, Los Angeles Dodgers
- Prince Fielder, 1B, Milwaukee Brewers (unanimous selection)
- Dan Uggla, 2B, Florida Marlins (unanimous selection)
- Ryan Zimmerman, 3B, Washington Nationals (unanimous selection)
- Hanley Ramírez, SS, Florida Marlins (unanimous selection)
- Melky Cabrera, OF, New York Yankees
- Andre Ethier, OF, Los Angeles Dodgers
- Nick Markakis, OF, Baltimore Orioles
- Justin Verlander, RHP, Detroit Tigers
- Francisco Liriano, LHP, Minnesota Twins

2007

- Carlos Ruiz, C, Philadelphia Phillies
- James Loney, 1B, Los Angeles Dodgers (unanimous selection)
- Dustin Pedroia, 2B, Boston Red Sox
- Ryan Braun, 3B, Milwaukee Brewers (unanimous selection)
- Troy Tulowitzki, SS, Colorado Rockies
- Delmon Young, OF, Tampa Bay Devil Rays (unanimous selection)
- Chris Young, OF, Arizona Diamondbacks (unanimous selection)
- Hunter Pence, OF, Houston Astros (unanimous selection)
- Brian Bannister, RHP, Kansas City Royals
- Hideki Okajima, LHP, Boston Red Sox

2008

- Geovany Soto, C, Chicago Cubs
- Joey Votto, 1B, Cincinnati Reds
- Alexei Ramírez, 2B, Chicago White Sox
- Evan Longoria, 3B, Tampa Bay Rays
- Mike Avilés, SS, Kansas City Royals
- Jay Bruce, OF, Cincinnati Reds
- Denard Span, OF, Minnesota Twins
- David Murphy, OF, Texas Rangers
- Brad Ziegler, RHP, Oakland Athletics
- John Lannan, LHP, Washington Nationals

2009

- Omir Santos, C, New York Mets
- Travis Ishikawa, 1B, San Francisco Giants
- Chris Getz, 2B, Chicago White Sox
- Gordon Beckham, 3B, Chicago White Sox
- Elvis Andrus, SS, Texas Rangers
- Chris Coghlan, OF, Florida Marlins
- Andrew McCutchen, OF, Pittsburgh Pirates
- Nolan Reimold, OF, Baltimore Orioles
- Tommy Hanson, RHP, Atlanta Braves
- J. A. Happ, LHP, Philadelphia Phillies

== 2010s ==
2010

- Buster Posey, C, San Francisco Giants
- Gaby Sánchez, 1B, Florida Marlins
- Neil Walker, 2B, Pittsburgh Pirates
- Danny Valencia, 3B, Minnesota Twins
- Starlin Castro, SS, Chicago Cubs
- Austin Jackson, OF, Detroit Tigers
- Giancarlo Stanton, OF, Florida Marlins
- Jason Heyward, OF, Atlanta Braves
- Stephen Strasburg, RHP, Washington Nationals
- Jaime García, LHP, St. Louis Cardinals
- Neftalí Feliz, RP, Texas Rangers

2011

- J. P. Arencibia, C, Toronto Blue Jays
- Mark Trumbo, 1B, Los Angeles Angels of Anaheim
- Danny Espinosa, 2B, Washington Nationals
- Brett Lawrie, 3B, Toronto Blue Jays
- Dee Gordon, SS, Los Angeles Dodgers
- Desmond Jennings, OF, Tampa Bay Rays
- Josh Reddick, OF, Boston Red Sox
- Ben Revere, OF, Minnesota Twins
- Jeremy Hellickson, Starting Pitcher, Tampa Bay Rays
- Craig Kimbrel, Relief Pitcher, Atlanta Braves

2012

- Wilin Rosario, C, Colorado Rockies
- Anthony Rizzo, 1B, Chicago Cubs
- Steve Lombardozzi Jr., 2B, Washington Nationals
- Todd Frazier, 3B, Cincinnati Reds
- Zack Cozart, SS, Cincinnati Reds
- Yoenis Céspedes, OF, Oakland Athletics
- Bryce Harper, OF, Washington Nationals
- Mike Trout, OF, Los Angeles Angels of Anaheim
- Yu Darvish, RHP, Texas Rangers
- Wade Miley, LHP, Arizona Diamondbacks
- Addison Reed, RP, Chicago White Sox

2013

- Evan Gattis, C, Atlanta Braves
- Matt Adams, 1B, St. Louis Cardinals
- Jedd Gyorko, 2B, San Diego Padres
- Nolan Arenado, 3B, Colorado Rockies
- José Iglesias, SS, Boston Red Sox/Detroit Tigers
- Wil Myers, OF, Tampa Bay Rays
- Yasiel Puig, OF, Los Angeles Dodgers
- Christian Yelich, OF, Miami Marlins
- Jose Fernández, RHP, Miami Marlins
- Hyun-jin Ryu, LHP, Los Angeles Dodgers
- Jim Henderson, RP, Milwaukee Brewers

2014

- Travis d'Arnaud, C, New York Mets
- Jose Abreu, 1B, Chicago White Sox
- Kolten Wong, 2B, St. Louis Cardinals
- Nick Castellanos, 3B, Detroit Tigers
- Xander Bogaerts, SS, Boston Red Sox
- Billy Hamilton, OF, Cincinnati Reds
- Danny Santana, OF, Minnesota Twins
- George Springer, OF, Houston Astros
- Masahiro Tanaka, RHP, New York Yankees
- Roenis Elías, LHP, Seattle Mariners
- Dellin Betances, RP, New York Yankees

2015

- J. T. Realmuto, C, Miami Marlins
- Justin Bour, 1B, Miami Marlins
- Addison Russell, 2B, Chicago Cubs
- Kris Bryant, 3B, Chicago Cubs
- Carlos Correa, SS, Houston Astros
- Michael Conforto, OF, New York Mets
- Randal Grichuk, OF, St. Louis Cardinals
- Kyle Schwarber, OF, Chicago Cubs
- Noah Syndergaard, RHP, New York Mets
- Carlos Rodon, LHP, Chicago White Sox
- Roberto Osuna, RP, Toronto Blue Jays
- Miguel Sanó, DH, Minnesota Twins

2016

- Gary Sánchez, C, New York Yankees
- Tommy Joseph, 1B, Philadelphia Phillies
- Ryan Schimpf, 2B, San Diego Padres
- Alex Bregman, 3B, Houston Astros
- Corey Seager, SS, Los Angeles Dodgers
- Nomar Mazara, OF, Texas Rangers
- Tyler Naquin, OF, Cleveland Indians
- Trea Turner, OF, Washington Nationals
- Kenta Maeda, RHP, Los Angeles Dodgers
- Julio Urias, LHP, Los Angeles Dodgers
- Seung-hwan Oh, RP, St. Louis Cardinals

2017

- Manny Pina, C, Milwaukee Brewers
- Cody Bellinger, 1B, Los Angeles Dodgers
- Ian Happ, 2B, Chicago Cubs
- Rafael Devers, 3B, Boston Red Sox
- Paul DeJong, SS, St. Louis Cardinals
- Andrew Benintendi, OF, Boston Red Sox
- Aaron Judge, OF, New York Yankees
- Trey Mancini, OF, Baltimore Orioles
- German Marquez, RHP, Colorado Rockies
- Jordan Montgomery, LHP, New York Yankees
- Josh Hader, RP, Milwaukee Brewers

2018

- Jorge Alfaro, C, Philadelphia Phillies
- Ryan O'Hearn, 1B, Kansas City Royals
- Gleyber Torres, 2B, New York Yankees
- Miguel Andújar, 3B, New York Yankees
- Willy Adames, SS, Tampa Bay Rays
- Ronald Acuña Jr., OF, Atlanta Braves
- Harrison Bader, OF, St. Louis Cardinals
- Juan Soto, OF, Washington Nationals
- Walker Buehler, RHP, Los Angeles Dodgers
- Ryan Yarbrough, LHP, Tampa Bay Rays
- A. J. Minter, RP, Atlanta Braves
- Shohei Ohtani, P/DH, Los Angeles Angels

2019

- Will Smith, C, Los Angeles Dodgers
- Pete Alonso, 1B, New York Mets
- Keston Hiura, 2B, Milwaukee Brewers
- Vladimir Guerrero Jr., 3B, Toronto Blue Jays
- Fernando Tatís Jr., SS, San Diego Padres
- Eloy Jimenez, OF, Chicago White Sox
- Bryan Reynolds, OF, Pittsburgh Pirates
- Victor Robles, OF, Washington Nationals
- Mike Soroka, RHP, Atlanta Braves
- John Means, LHP, Baltimore Orioles
- Nick Anderson, RP, Tampa Bay Rays
- Yordan Alvarez, DH, Houston Astros

== 2020s ==
2020

- Sean Murphy, C, Oakland Athletics
- Jared Walsh, 1B, Los Angeles Angels
- Jake Cronenworth, 2B, San Diego Padres
- Alec Bohm, 3B, Philadelphia Phillies
- Willi Castro, SS, Detroit Tigers
- Kyle Lewis, OF, Seattle Mariners
- Ryan Mountcastle, OF, Baltimore Orioles
- Luis Robert, OF, Chicago White Sox
- Tony Gonsolin, RHP, Los Angeles Dodgers
- Kwang-hyun Kim, LHP, St. Louis Cardinals
- Devin Williams, RP, Milwaukee Brewers

2021

- Tyler Stephenson, C, Cincinnati Reds
- Ryan Mountcastle, 1B, Baltimore Orioles
- Jonathan India, 2B, Cincinnati Reds
- Patrick Wisdom, 3B, Chicago Cubs
- Wander Franco, SS, Tampa Bay Rays
- Randy Arozarena, OF, Tampa Bay Rays
- Adolis García, OF, Texas Rangers
- Dylan Carlson, OF, St. Louis Cardinals
- Luis García, RHP, Houston Astros
- Trevor Rogers, LHP, Miami Marlins
- Emmanuel Clase, RP, Cleveland Indians

2022

- Adley Rutschman, C, Baltimore Orioles
- Joey Meneses, 1B, Washington Nationals
- Brendan Donovan, 2B, St. Louis Cardinals
- Bobby Witt Jr., 3B, Kansas City Royals
- Jeremy Peña, SS, Houston Astros
- Julio Rodríguez, OF, Seattle Mariners
- Michael Harris II, OF, Atlanta Braves
- Steven Kwan, OF, Cleveland Guardians
- Spencer Strider, RHP, Atlanta Braves
- Reid Detmers, LHP, Los Angeles Angels
- Alexis Díaz, RP, Cincinnati Reds
- Vinnie Pasquantino, DH, Kansas City Royals

2023

- Yainer Díaz, C, Houston Astros
- Spencer Steer, 1B, Cincinnati Reds
- Matt McLain, 2B, Cincinnati Reds
- Josh Jung, 3B, Texas Rangers
- Gunnar Henderson, SS, Baltimore Orioles
- Corbin Carroll, OF, Arizona Diamondbacks
- James Outman, OF, Los Angeles Dodgers
- Nolan Jones, OF, Colorado Rockies
- Kodai Senga, RHP, New York Mets
- Andrew Abbott, LHP, Cincinnati Reds
- Yennier Canó, RP, Baltimore Orioles
- Masataka Yoshida, DH, Boston Red Sox

2024

- Austin Wells, C, New York Yankees
- Michael Busch, 1B, Chicago Cubs
- Colt Keith, 2B, Detroit Tigers
- Joey Ortiz, 3B, Milwaukee Brewers
- Masyn Winn, SS, St. Louis Cardinals
- Jackson Merrill, OF, San Diego Padres
- Jackson Chourio, OF, Milwaukee Brewers
- Colton Cowser, OF, Baltimore Orioles
- Paul Skenes, RHP, Pittsburgh Pirates
- Shota Imanaga, LHP, Chicago Cubs
- Mason Miller, RP, Oakland Athletics
- Wyatt Langford, DH, Texas Rangers

2025

- Drake Baldwin, C, Atlanta Braves
- Nick Kurtz, 1B, Athletics
- Luke Keaschall, 2B, Minnesota Twins
- Matt Shaw, 3B, Chicago Cubs
- Jacob Wilson, SS, Athletics
- Isaac Collins, OF, Milwaukee Brewers
- Roman Anthony, OF, Boston Red Sox
- Jakob Marsee, OF, Miami Marlins
- Cade Horton, RHP, Chicago Cubs
- Noah Cameron, LHP, Kansas City Royals
- Jack Dreyer, RP, Los Angeles Dodgers
- Agustín Ramírez, DH, Miami Marlins

== See also ==
- Topps All-Star Rookie Team main page
- Major League Baseball Rookie of the Year Award
- This Year in Baseball Awards Rookie of the Year
- Players Choice Awards Outstanding Rookie
- Baseball America Rookie of the Year
- Sporting News Rookie of the Year Award
- Major League Baseball Rookie of the Month Award
- Baseball awards
