= 1991 Houston Astros season =

30th season in Major League Baseball for the Houston Astros

1991 Houston Astros
- League: National League
- Division: West
- Ballpark: The Astrodome
- City: Houston, Texas
- Record: 65–97 (.401)
- Divisional place: 6th
- Owners: John McMullen
- General managers: Bill Wood
- Managers: Art Howe
- Television: KTXH; HSE
- Radio: KPRC (AM) (Bill Brown, Milo Hamilton, Larry Dierker, Vince Controneo, Bill Worrell, Enos Cabell); KXYZ (Orlando Sánchez-Diago, Rolando Becerra)

The 1991 Houston Astros season was the 30th season for the Major League Baseball (MLB) franchise located in Houston, Texas, their 27th as the Astros, 30th in the National League (NL), 23rd in the NL West division, and 27th at the Astrodome. The Astros ended the season with a 75–87 record, in fourth place in the NL West and 16 games behind the division- and World Series-champion Cincinnati Reds.

The season began for Houston on April 8 against Cincinnati at Riverfront Stadium, where they were defeated, 6–2. Pitcher Mike Scott made the fifth of five consecutive Opening Day starts for the Astros. In the amateur draft, the Astros received four first round picks—including pitcher John Burke at sixth overall—and three supplemental picks.

Catcher Craig Biggio and pitcher Pete Harnisch represented the Astros at the MLB All-Star Game. It was the second career selection for Biggio, and the only career selection for Harnisch.

The Astros concluded the regular season with a 65–97 record, in last place and 29 games behind the NL West division-champion and NL pennant-winning Atlanta Braves, and worst record in the National League. At the time, the 97 losses tied the 1965 and 1975 clubs for the most in franchise history, and was surpassed by the 2011 club.

In spite of the disappointing record, the 1991 season was a banner year overall for Houston rookies. First baseman Jeff Bagwell won the NL Rookie of the Year Award, (Note: As determined by the Baseball Writers' Association of America (BBWAA).) becoming the first Astro to win this award. Bagwell and Al Osuna (pitcher) were also recognized as The Sporting News NL Rookies of the Year. (Note: From 1961–2003, The Sporting News declared one rookie position player and one rookie pitcher from each league, the NL and the American League (AL), for this award. Starting in 2004, this system was modified to selecting one rookie from each league for the award, regardless of position.) Additionally, four Astros were selected for the 1991 Topps All-Star Rookie Team, including Bagwell, Osuna (left-handed pitcher), Andújar Cedeño (shortstop), and Luis Gonzalez (outfielder).

== Offseason ==
- October 4, 1990: Bill Gullickson was released by the Astros.
- January 10, 1991: Glenn Davis was traded by the Astros to the Baltimore Orioles for Curt Schilling, Steve Finley and Pete Harnisch.

== Regular season ==
=== Summary ===
==== April ====
Opening Day starting lineup
Uniform	Player	Position
15	Eric Yelding	Shortstop
12	Steve Finley	Center fielder
7	Craig Biggio	Catcher
26	Luis Gonzalez	Left fielder
11	Ken Caminiti	Third baseman
5	Jeff Bagwell (Note: Major league debut.)	First baseman
4	Karl Rhodes	Right fielder
20	Mark McLemore	Second baseman
33	Mike Scott	Starting pitcher
Venue: Riverfront Stadium • Cincinnati 6, Houston 2 Sources:

On April 8, right-hander Mike Scott made the Opening Day start for Houston, while first baseman Jeff Bagwell and right-hander Darryl Kile each made his major league debut, with the defending World Series-champion Cincinnati Reds hosting the Astros at Riverfront Stadium. Bagwell, batting sixth, drew a base on balls during the top of the second inning from Reds' Opening Day starter Tom Browning for his first plate appearance. In the top of the fourth, Craig Biggio golfed the Astros' first home run and scored the club's first run of the season to take a 1–0 lead. The Reds got to Scott in the bottom of the fourth. Leading off, Barry Larkin homered to left and the Reds collected three doubles, capped by Browning's bases-loaded double for a 4–1 advantage. Kile assumed the bottom of eighth, and punched out his first hitter looking, Hal Morris. Bagwell recorded the final outs of the contest by lining out to Larkin for an unassisted double play. Bagwell was hitless in three at bats for his first game while the Reds won, 6–2.

His fifth Opening Day start, Scott matched J. R. Richard's then-club record for pitchers, (Note: 1976–1980) which stood until Roy Oswalt started his sixth in a row for Houston's opener in 2008. (Note: Richard and Scott were later equaled by Shane Reynolds (1996–2000).) However, this outing would be the penultimate appearance of Scott's major league career.

Scott made his final major league appearance on April 13 at the Astrodome. He took the loss against the San Francisco Giants, to whom he surrendered six hits and five runs surrendered over three innings. Having navigated lingering rotator cuff injuries since the 1989 campaign, the Astros placed Scott on the disabled list (DL) the following day. Later in April, Scott attempted to resume throwing, but a setback halted his progress.

On April 15, Bagwell crushed his first major league home run, which was as well-timed as could be, for both the player, batting .143, and the club. Starters Jim Deshaies and John Smoltz of the Atlanta Braves remained in lockstep in a duel at 1–1 through seven innings at Atlanta–Fulton County Stadium. Smoltz' only blemish was a solo home run to Craig Biggio in the sixth inning. The score remained tied until the top of the ninth. With two out, Ken Caminiti singled off Kent Mercker, who then served a two-run blast to Bagwell for his first major league homer. The Astros bullpen ensured the lead stood, as fellow rookie Al Osuna (1–0) recorded two outs to earn his first win of the season and Curt Schilling induced the final two outs for the save (2).

On April 16, Houston turned the seventh triple play in franchise history, during the bottom of the second inning against Atlanta. This feat mirrored the most recent triple play to have occurred in the major leagues, during the previous September 21, in which the Astros also turned one against the Braves on the road.

Right-hander Darryl Kile made his first major league start on April 24, and proceeded to toss six no-hit frames prior to being removed. Facing the Reds, Kile surrendered a leadoff base on balls to Paul O'Neill for the first baserunner. Reds starter Jack Armstrong was also overpowering, allowing a fifth inning single to Tuffy Rhodes. Southpaw Al Osuna took over for Kile in the seventh and added two hitless innings. Curt Schilling then assumed the mound for the ninth, and former Astro Bill Doran singled for Cincinnati's first hit. D oran advanced to third on a wild pitch, but Schilling whiffed Barry Larkin to extinguish the threat. The contest remained scoreless through regulation. In the bottom of the 13th, Ken Oberkfell hit a looping, walk-off single that caromed off the glove of second baseman Mariano Duncan to score Rafael Ramírez for the winning run. Kile's performance earned a game score of 75, while yielding just two walks for his only baserunners.

==== May ====
Inserted as a pinch hitter on May 5, Jeff Bagwell pummeled a home run that reached the upper deck at Three Rivers Stadium, just the ninth hitter to do so. The blast, which tied the game, 4–4, covered a distance of 456 feet (139 m). Steve Finley followed up by slugging a two-run bomb to provide the margin for a 6–4 Astros win.

==== June ====
After surrendering three runs and the lead in the top-half of the ninth inning on June 6, the Astros rallied against the Montreal Expos to win, 9–8. Luis Gonzalez and Ken Caminiti each hit run batted in (RBI)-doubles to spark the walk-off comeback.

On June 23, Darryl Kile earned his first major league victory, during which he tossed seven innings with two runs allowed in a 6–4 decision over the Philadelphia Phillies. Kile withstood high-quality hitting from Phillies catcher Darren Daulton, who took Kile deep twice for his only runs surrendered, had three total hits and reached base four times. In the top of the sixth, Kile coaxed a bases-loaded walk that plated Luis Gonzalez to garner his first major league RBI. Ken Oberkfell pinch hit for Kile in the top of the eighth and provided a crucial insurance run with a two-run double that extended the Astros' advantage to 6 to 2.

==== July ====
On July 29, Ken Caminiti connected for his first career grand slam off Bryn Smith, during the bottom of the fourth inning to take a 4–1 lead over the St. Louis Cardinals. The decisive event, the slam ensured the margin for victory with a 6–2 final score. Biggio collected four hits, while Finley legged out a triple and scored. Deshaies went the distance to pick up his fourth win.

==== August ====
On August 4, Houston implemented the eighth triple play in franchise history, during the top of the fifth inning versus the Los Angeles Dodgers. This was the third time in club history that the Astros turned more than one triple play during the same season, first accomplished in 1971, and then 1978 (one of which during the latter season was also prosecuted against the Dodgers). Moreover, this event was distinguished the first occasion that Houston turned as many as three triple plays within one calendar year. (Note: Previously, September 21, 1990, and April 16, 1991.)

==== September ====
For the week ended September 1, Ken Caminiti received National League (NL) Player of the Week honors. Over 7 games, Caminti hit .363 / .419 / .679, two doubles, two home runs, and 14 RBI.

On September 6, Pete Harnisch tossed an immaculate seventh inning, retiring Wes Chamberlain, Dickie Thon, and José DeJesús of the Philadelphia Phillies. Harnish (9–8) allowed four hits and one run over seven innings, whiffing 12 total for a game score of 75, leading a 3–1 Astros win. Jeff Bagwell homered (14) and doubled (22) off DeJesús. Al Osuna worked the final two innings to obtain the save (11). Harnisch succeeded David Cone as the most recent to toss an immaculate inning in the National League. This was the second immaculate inning in club history, joining Bob Bruce on April 19, 1964.

Center fielder Kenny Lofton made his major league debut on September 14. Batting leadoff at Riverfront Stadium, Lofton sparked the Astros to a 7–3 victory by reaching base four times, including three hits, and scoring three times. Lofton drew a base on balls from left-hander Randy Myers in his first plate appearance. Bagwell doubled in Lofton and Biggio for a 2–0 Astros lead and Lofton's first run in the major leagues. In the bottom of the fourth, the Reds led off with a trio of consecutive home runs via Mariano Duncan, Hal Morris, and Paul O'Neill, taking Astros starter Mark Portugal deep for a 3–2 lead. During the bottom of the fifth, Lofton singled off Myers on a line drive between shortstop and second base for his first major league hit. The Astros regained the lead in the eighth after Lofton hit a leadoff infield single, and singles from Biggio and Caminiti. Lofton doubled in the top of the ninth for a third hit, and again scored as the Astros added an insurance.

The Astros held a pre-game ceremony for Scott on September 25 to commemorate the fifth anniversary of his NL West division-clinching no-hitter. He had remained unable to throw since being placed on the DL in April and, at that time, predicted that his playing career was over. In November following the season, Scott formally announced his retirement.

==== Performance overview ====
I’m lucky to be alive. I’m happy to be alive. I’m doing everything I can to play again. It would be a plus. But there are more important things.

— Dickie Thon

The Astros concluded the 1991 campaign with a 65–97 record, for sixth and last place with in the NL West, trailing the division-champion and NL pennant-winning Atlanta Braves. Theirs was also the worst record in the National League. A decline by 10 wins from the year prior, the 97 losses tied for most in club annals with the 1965 and 1975 editions. The 97 defeats remained the club record until 2011, with 106—Houston's first-ever season dropping 100 or more contests. However, the Astros would not have another losing season again until 2000; moreover, the 1990 to 1991 campaigns represented the final period of successive losing records for the Astros until 2009 to 2014.

Former Astro Dickie Thon received the second iteration of the Tony Conigliaro Award, bestowed annually to the Major Leaguer who supersedes “an obstacle and adversity through the attributes of spirit, determination and courage." Early in the 1984 campaign as a member of the Astros, Thon was struck on the temple by a Mike Torrez fastball, resulting in permanent vision changes that degraded his efficacy as a Major League player. Like Thon, Conigliaro endured catastrophic vision change after having been struck in the head by a pitch as a member of the Boston Red Sox in 1967.

Pete Harnisch led the National League in hits per nine innings surrendered (7.020 H/9). This was the 10th time that a Houston pitcher led the league; in 1987, Nolan Ryan had been the Astros' most recent league leader.

For the first and only time during the era in which The Sporting News recognized one Rookie of the Year each for one position player and one pitcher in the each league, both NL awards went to Astros: Bagwell and to left-hander Al Osuna. Bagwell became the fourth rookie to win for position players, following Joe Morgan (1965), Greg Gross (1974), and Jeffrey Leonard (1979). Meanhile, Osuna became the second Astros pitcher to win the award, following Tom Griffin in 1969, amounting to six total Astros who had won The Sporting News rookie award.

After four occasions prior to the 1991 seasons in which The Sporting News had recognized Astros players with their Rookie of the Year Award, Bagwell also became Houston's first-ever NL Rookie of the Year Award, as voted by the Baseball Writers' Association of America (BBWAA).

=== League standings ===
==== National League West ====
NL West
Team	W	L	Pct.	GB	Home	Road
Atlanta Braves	94	68	.580	—	48‍–‍33	46‍–‍35
Los Angeles Dodgers	93	69	.574	1	54‍–‍27	39‍–‍42
San Diego Padres	84	78	.519	10	42‍–‍39	42‍–‍39
San Francisco Giants	75	87	.463	19	43‍–‍38	32‍–‍49
Cincinnati Reds	74	88	.457	20	39‍–‍42	35‍–‍46
Houston Astros	65	97	.401	29	37‍–‍44	28‍–‍53

==== Record versus opponents ====
National League

1991 National League record Sources:
Team	ATL	CHC	CIN	HOU	LAD	MON	NYM	PHI	PIT	SD	SF	STL
Atlanta	—	6–6	11–7	13–5	7–11	5–7	9–3	5–7	9–3	11–7	9–9	9–3
Chicago	6–6	—	4–8	9–3	2–10	10–7	11–6	8–10	7–11	4–8	6–6	10–8
Cincinnati	7–11	8–4	—	9–9	6–12	6–6	5–7	9–3	2–10	8–10	10–8	4–8
Houston	5–13	3–9	9–9	—	8–10	2–10	7–5	7–5	4–8	6–12	9–9	5–7
Los Angeles	11–7	10–2	12–6	10–8	—	5–7	7–5	7–5	7–5	10–8	8–10	6–6
Montreal	7–5	7–10	6–6	10–2	7–5	—	4–14	4–14	6–12	6–6	7–5	7–11
New York	3–9	6–11	7–5	5–7	5–7	14–4	—	11–7	6–12	7–5	6–6	7–11
Philadelphia	7-5	10–8	3–9	5–7	5–7	14–4	7–11	—	6–12	9–3	6–6	6–12
Pittsburgh	3–9	11–7	10–2	8–4	5–7	12–6	12–6	12–6	—	7–5	7–5	11–7
San Diego	7–11	8–4	10–8	12–6	8–10	6–6	5–7	3–9	5–7	—	11–7	9–3
San Francisco	9–9	6–6	8–10	9–9	10–8	5–7	6–6	6–6	5–7	7–11	—	4–8
St. Louis	3–9	8–10	8–4	7–5	6–6	11–7	11–7	12–6	7–11	3–9	8–4	—

=== Roster ===
1991 Houston Astros
Roster
Pitchers: 46 Ryan Bowen; 35 Mike Capel; 38 Jim Clancy; 41 Jim Corsi; 43 Jim Deshaies; 39 Chris Gardner; 27 Pete Harnisch; 47 Dwayne Henry; 31 Xavier Hernandez; 37 Jimmy Jones; 44 Jeff Juden; 57 Darryl Kile; 56 Rob Mallicoat; 52 Al Osuna; 51 Mark Portugal; 19 Curt Schilling; 33 Mike Scott; 36 Dean Wilkins; 53 Brian Williams	Catchers: 7 Craig Biggio; 10 Tony Eusebio; 28 Carl Nichols; 9 Scott Servais; Infielders: 5 Jeff Bagwell; 11 Ken Caminiti; 1 Casey Candaele; 17 Andújar Cedeño; 36 Gary Cooper; 20 Mark McLemore; 23 Andy Mota; 10 Ken Oberkfell; 16 Rafael Ramírez; 6 Dave Rohde; 20 Jose Tolentino; 15 Eric Yelding	Outfielders: 23 Eric Anthony; 22 Mark Davidson; 12 Steve Finley; 26 Luis Gonzalez; 28 Kenny Lofton; 29 Javier Ortiz; 4 Karl Rhodes; 30 Mike Simms; 2 Gerald Young	Manager: 18 Art Howe; Coaches: 54 Bob Cluck (pitching); 48 Matt Galante (third base); 3 Phil Garner (assistant); 42 Rudy Jaramillo (hitting); 14 Ed Ott (first base)

=== Transactions ===
- May 20: Signed right-handed pitcher Óscar Henríquez as an international free agent.

== Player stats ==
=== Batting ===
==== Starters by position ====
Note: Pos = Position; G = Games played; AB = At bats; H = Hits; Avg. = Batting average; HR = Home runs; RBI = Runs batted in

Pos	Player	G	AB	H	Avg.	HR	RBI
C	Craig Biggio	149	546	161	.295	4	46
1B	Jeff Bagwell	156	554	163	.294	15	82
2B	Casey Candaele	151	461	121	.262	4	50
3B	Ken Caminiti	152	574	145	.253	13	80
SS	Eric Yelding	78	276	67	.243	1	20
LF	Luis Gonzalez	137	473	120	.254	13	69
CF	Steve Finley	159	596	170	.285	8	54
RF	Tuffy Rhodes	44	136	29	.213	1	12

==== Other batters ====
Note: G = Games played; AB = At bats; H = Hits; Avg. = Batting average; HR = Home runs; RBI = Runs batted in

Player	G	AB	H	Avg.	HR	RBI
Andújar Cedeño	67	251	61	.243	9	36
Rafael Ramírez	101	233	55	.236	1	20
Gerald Young	108	142	31	.218	1	11
Mark Davidson	85	142	27	.190	2	15
Mike Simms	49	123	25	.203	3	16
Eric Anthony	39	118	18	.153	1	7
Andy Mota	27	90	17	.189	1	6
Javier Ortiz	47	83	23	.277	1	5
Kenny Lofton	20	74	15	.203	0	0
Ken Oberkfell	53	70	16	.229	0	14
Mark McLemore	21	61	9	.148	0	2
José Tolentino	44	54	14	.259	1	6
Carl Nichols	20	51	10	.196	0	1
Dave Rohde	29	41	5	.122	0	0
Scott Servais	16	37	6	.162	0	6
Tony Eusebio	10	19	2	.105	0	0
Gary Cooper	9	16	4	.250	0	2

=== Pitching ===
==== Starting pitchers ====
Note: G = Games pitched; IP = Innings pitched; W = Wins; L = Losses; ERA = Earned run average; SO = Strikeouts

Player	G	IP	W	L	ERA	SO
Pete Harnisch	33	216.2	12	9	2.70	172
Mark Portugal	32	168.1	10	12	4.49	120
Jim Deshaies	28	161.0	5	12	4.98	98
Jimmy Jones	26	135.1	6	8	4.39	88
Ryan Bowen	14	71.2	6	4	5.15	49
Chris Gardner	5	24.2	1	2	4.01	12
Jeff Juden	4	18.0	0	2	6.00	11
Brian Williams	2	12.0	0	1	3.75	4
Mike Scott	2	7.0	0	2	12.86	3

==== Other pitchers ====
Note: G = Games pitched; IP = Innings pitched; W = Wins; L = Losses; ERA = Earned run average; SO = Strikeouts

Player	G	IP	W	L	ERA	SO
Darryl Kile	37	153.2	7	11	3.69	100
Xavier Hernandez	32	63.0	2	7	4.71	55

==== Relief pitchers ====
Note: G = Games pitched; W = Wins; L = Losses; SV = Saves; ERA = Earned run average; SO = Strikeouts

Player	G	W	L	SV	ERA	SO
Al Osuna	71	7	6	12	3.42	68
Curt Schilling	56	3	5	8	3.81	71
Dwayne Henry	52	3	2	2	3.19	51
Jim Corsi	47	0	5	0	3.71	53
Jim Clancy	30	0	3	5	2.78	33
Mike Capel	25	1	3	3	3.03	23
Rob Mallicoat	24	0	2	1	3.86	18
Dean Wilkins	7	2	1	1	11.25	4

== Awards and honors ==
=== Grand slams ===
No.	Date	Astros batter	Venue	Inning	Pitcher	Opposing team	Box
1	July 29	Ken Caminiti (Note: 1st MLB grand slam)	Astrodome	4 (Note: Tied score or took lead)	Bryn Smith	St. Louis Cardinals	

=== Pitching achievements ===
==== No-hit bid ====
Date	Starting pitcher (IP)	Relief pitcher(s) (IP)	No-hit IP	GS	Catcher	Batter	Final	Opponent	Box
April 24, 1991	Darryl Kile (6)	Al Osuna (2); Curt Schilling (0)	8	75	Craig Biggio	Bill Doran (Note: First batter of ninth inning.)	1–0	Cincinnati Reds	
Note: Includes those games started with 7 or more no-hit innings.

=== Awards ===
1991 Houston Astros award winners
Name of award		Recipient	Ref.
Baseball America Rookie of the Year		Jeff Bagwell	
Baseball Digest Rookie All-Stars	First baseman	Jeff Bagwell	
Baseball Digest Rookie All-Stars	Outfielder	Luis Gonzalez	
Baseball Digest Rookie All-Stars	Relief pitcher	Al Osuna	
Fred Hartman Award for Long and Meritorious Service to Baseball		Clark Nealon	
Houston-Area Major League Player of the Year	BOS	Roger Clemens	
Houston-Area Major League Player of the Year	CLE	Greg Swindell	
Houston Astros Most Valuable Player Award (MVP)		Jeff Bagwell	
MLB All-Star Game	Reserve catcher	Craig Biggio	
MLB All-Star Game	Reserve pitcher	Pete Harnisch	
National League (NL) Player of the Week	September 1	Ken Caminiti	
National League (NL) Player of the Week	September 8	Andújar Cedeño	
National League (NL) Rookie of the Year		Jeff Bagwell	
The Sporting News NL Rookie of the Year:	Position player	Jeff Bagwell	
The Sporting News NL Rookie of the Year:	Pitcher	Al Osuna	
Tony Conigliaro Award		Dickie Thon (Note: Recognized as a former Astros player (not on the team's roster in 1991), bestowed annually to the Major Leaguer who supersedes “an obstacle and adversity through the attributes of spirit, determination and courage.")	
Topps All-Star Rookie Team	First baseman	Jeff Bagwell	
Topps All-Star Rookie Team	Shortstop	Andújar Cedeño	
Topps All-Star Rookie Team	Outfielder	Luis Gonzalez	
Topps All-Star Rookie Team	Left-handed pitcher	Al Osuna	

=== Milestones ===
==== Major League debuts ====
Player—Appeared at position

- Jeff Bagwell, first baseman
- Darryl Kile, relief pitcher
- Kenny Lofton, center fielder

Date and opponent

- April 8 at Cincinnati (Note: Opening Day)
- April 8 at Cincinnati
- September 14 at Cincinnati
Also:
Box

== Minor league system ==
Level	Team	League	Manager
AAA	Tucson Toros	Pacific Coast League	Bob Skinner
AA	Jackson Generals	Texas League	Rick Sweet
A	Osceola Astros	Florida State League	Sal Butera
A	Burlington Astros	Midwest League	Tim Tolman
A	Asheville Tourists	South Atlantic League	Frank Cacciatore
A-Short Season	Auburn Astros	New York–Penn League	Steve Dillard
Rookie	GCL Astros	Gulf Coast League	Julio Linares

Championship

- Pacific Coast League champions: Tucson

Awards

- Pacific Coast League Manager of the Year: Bob Skinner

== See also ==
- List of Major League Baseball pitchers who have thrown an immaculate inning
