= Jeff Juden =

American baseball player (born 1971)

- Pitcher
- Born: January 19, 1971 (age 55); Salem, Massachusetts, U.S.
- Batted: Right Threw: Right

MLB debut
- September 15, 1991, for the Houston Astros

Last MLB appearance
- October 3, 1999, for the New York Yankees

MLB statistics
- Win–loss record: 27–32
- Earned run average: 4.81
- Strikeouts: 441
- Stats at Baseball Reference

Teams
- Houston Astros (1991, 1993); Philadelphia Phillies (1994–1995); San Francisco Giants (1996); Montreal Expos (1996–1997); Cleveland Indians (1997); Milwaukee Brewers (1998); Anaheim Angels (1998); New York Yankees (1999)

Jeffrey Daniel Juden (born January 19, 1971) is an American former professional baseball pitcher. He played in Major League Baseball for the Houston Astros, Philadelphia Phillies, San Francisco Giants, Montreal Expos, Cleveland Indians, Milwaukee Brewers, Anaheim Angels & won a World Series ring with the 1999 New York Yankees.

== Career ==
Juden was one of the top high school pitching prospects in the nation after his senior season, leading Salem High School to the Massachusetts state championship in 1989. He was a High School All-American and was named the Gatorade Massachusetts Baseball Player of the Year, and Boston Globe All-Scholastic spring highlighted player. The Houston Astros selected him with the 12th overall pick in the first round of the 1989 Major League Baseball draft.

Juden began his professional career by going 10–0 in his first 10 starts with the Osceola Astros of the Class-A Florida State League, and he was selected to the FSL All-Star Team before getting moved up to the AA Columbus Mudcats in 1990. In 1991 and 1993 Juden was a part of 2 PCL Championship teams as a member of the Tucson Toros of the Pacific Coast League. Juden made his major league debut on September 15, 1991, becoming the youngest active player in baseball that year when he appeared in relief of Chris Gardner in a game against the Cincinnati Reds.

Despite his early promise, Juden battled some injuries early on in his career when he had elbow surgery during his stint with the Phillies from 1994 to 1995. He started his MLB career 3–11. After his surgery, Juden went on to have a 24–21 record from 1996 on until his release by the New York Yankees in the spring of 2000. His best season was 1997 when he was the National League Pitcher of the Week, beating Roger Clemens in front of a record crowd on Canada Day in Toronto. Juden pitched 161 1/3 innings for the Montreal Expos and Cleveland Indians that year, compiling an 11–6 record with 136 strikeouts and a 4.46 earned run average (ERA), and winning an American League Championship in Cleveland.

Juden was involved in a large number of trades throughout the course of his career. He and closer Doug Jones were traded to the Philadelphia Phillies after the 1993 season in exchange for Mitch Williams. In 1995, he and prospect Tommy Eason went to the San Francisco Giants for infielder Mike Benjamin. Two years later, Juden moved from the Montreal Expos to the Indians for reliever Steve Kline at the trade deadline. Despite starting the season with an 11-2 record, Expos management was eager to get rid of Juden, who was associating with unsavory individuals in downtown Montreal and nearly came to blows with F.P. Santangelo and Pedro Martinez during a team flight. After that season ended, he and Marquis Grissom went to the Milwaukee Brewers, in a deal for Mike Fetters, Ben McDonald, and Ron Villone. This deal was enveloped in controversy after it became clear that McDonald had suffered a career-ending shoulder injury shortly before it had been completed.

Juden last pitched in the major leagues in 1999 as a member of the 1999 World Series Champion New York Yankees. He retired after that season, and an attempt at a comeback in 2004 with the Nashua Pride of the independent Atlantic League proved unsuccessful. He ended his career with a 27–32 record, 441 strikeouts, and a 4.81 ERA in 533 career major league innings.

== Personal life ==
Since retiring from baseball, Juden has been coaching Little League, Babe Ruth League, and 1 year in the Prospect League with the inaugural season of the Hannibal Cavemen as their pitching coach. He has two sons, Fredrick and Dalton.

In 2002, Juden wrote, recorded, and co-produced his first album with Keith Ridenhour at Ridenhour Studios in South Florida. The CD was mastered by Dan O'Brien. The CD is titled Anything You Want To Be. The CD wasn't publicly released until 2012 by cdbaby.com.
