= Mark Quinn =

American baseball player (born 1974)

- Outfielder
- Born: May 21, 1974 (age 52); La Mirada, California, U.S.
- Batted: Right Threw: Right

MLB debut
- September 14, 1999, for the Kansas City Royals

Last MLB appearance
- June 7, 2002, for the Kansas City Royals

MLB statistics
- Batting average: .282
- Home runs: 45
- Runs Batted In: 167
- Stats at Baseball Reference

Teams
- Kansas City Royals (1999–2002)

Mark David Quinn (born May 21, 1974) is an American former Major League Baseball outfielder and right-handed batter who played for the Kansas City Royals and former coach for the Baltimore Orioles. Quinn was drafted in the 11th round of the 1995 Amateur Draft after playing two seasons for the Rice University Owls. He played for the Royals between 1999 and 2002. He retired for good in 2007 after spring training with the Yomiuri Giants.

== Career ==
In 1998, Quinn led the Texas League in batting average when he hit .349 for the Wichita Wranglers. He captured a second minor league batting crown the following year, posting a .360 average for the Omaha Golden Spikes of the Pacific Coast League.

On September 14, 1999, Quinn made his major league debut and became just the fourth player in MLB history to hit two home runs in his major league debut, joining Charlie Reilly (1889), Bob Nieman (1951) and Bert Campaneris (1964). In 17 games in September, Quinn hit .333 with 6 home runs and 18 RBIs.

In 2000, Quinn became the Royals regular leftfielder. He hit .294 with 20 home runs and 78 RBIs in 135 games, earning him the Sporting News American League Rookie Player of the Year and a spot on the 2000 Topps All-Star Rookie Team. Quinn finished 3rd in AL Rookie of the Year voting, behind Kazuhiro Sasaki and Terrence Long, garnering four first-place votes.

Quinn split the 2001 season between right field, left field, and designated hitter. His production at the plate dropped to 17 homers and a .269 average due to nagging hamstring injuries.

The 2002 campaign was plagued by injuries that forced Quinn to spend 156 total days on the injured list that season. He appeared in just 23 games in the major leagues, hitting .237 with 2 home runs and 11 RBIs.

During 2003 Spring Training, Quinn was released by the Royals after going just 1-for-8 in his appearances and suffering another setback with his hamstring.

In four seasons with the Royals, Quinn batted .282 with 45 home runs, 167 RBI, 153 runs, 72 doubles, five triples, and 17 stolen bases in 293 games.

Following his release, Quinn played in the San Diego Padres, Tampa Bay Devil Rays, St. Louis Cardinals, and Chicago White Sox organizations, along with a stint with the Long Beach Armada of the independent Golden Baseball League, but was never able to return to the major leagues.

== Coaching ==
Mark Quinn owns The Baseball School in Houston, Tx, and coaches the Houston Royals select teams.

On January 6, 2016, Quinn was hired to become the assistant hitting coach for the Baltimore Orioles.
