= Chris Gardner (baseball) =

American baseball player (born 1969)

- Pitcher
- Born: March 30, 1969 (age 57); Long Beach, California, U.S.
- Batted: Right Threw: Right

MLB debut
- September 10, 1991, for the Houston Astros

Last MLB appearance
- October 5, 1991, for the Houston Astros

MLB statistics
- Win–loss record: 1–2
- Earned run average: 4.01
- Strikeouts: 12
- Stats at Baseball Reference

Teams
- Houston Astros (1991)

Christopher John Gardner (born March 30, 1969) is an American former Major League Baseball pitcher who played for the Houston Astros in 1991. He wore jersey number 39.

== Early life ==
In 1987 as a senior for Paso Robles High School, Gardner hit .350 with six home runs, earning the San Luis Obispo Tribune's County Baseball Player of the Year award, All-CIF Division 1-A honors, and the Los Padres League co-MVP award. He also compiled a 2.47 earned-run average along with a 9-1 record on the mound.

== College baseball career ==
While pitching for Cuesta College in 1988, Gardner won five games, led the Cougars with 45 strikeouts, and compiled a team-best 3.43 ERA.

== Professional baseball career ==
Houston selected Gardner in the sixth round of the 1988 MLB Draft.

Gardner was called-up by the Astros after a stint starring in Jackson, Mississippi at the Double-A Texas League level, where he finished 1991 with a 13-5 record and a 3.15 ERA.

His best major league performance came on September 30, 1991, as he led the Astros to a 2-0 shutout at San Francisco, earning the win with six strikeouts, scattering six hits with three walks in seven innings of work.

MLB Statistics
Season	Team	W	L	ERA	App.	GS	IP	H	SO	BB
1991	HOU	1	2	4.01	5	4	24.2	19	12	14
