= Bob Hamelin =

American baseball player (born 1967)

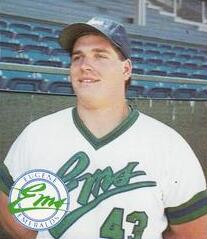
- Hamelin with the Eugene Emeralds c. 1988
- First baseman / Designated hitter
- Born: November 29, 1967 (age 58); Elizabeth, New Jersey, U.S.
- Batted: Left Threw: Left

MLB debut
- September 12, 1993, for the Kansas City Royals

Last MLB appearance
- September 27, 1998, for the Milwaukee Brewers

MLB statistics
- Batting average: .246
- Home runs: 67
- Runs batted in: 209
- Stats at Baseball Reference

Teams
- Kansas City Royals (1993–1996); Detroit Tigers (1997); Milwaukee Brewers (1998)

Career highlights and awards
- AL Rookie of the Year (1994)

Robert James Hamelin (/ˈhæmlɪn/; born November 29, 1967) is an American former first baseman and designated hitter who played six seasons in Major League Baseball (MLB), primarily with the Kansas City Royals. He also played for the Detroit Tigers and the Milwaukee Brewers. He batted and threw left-handed.

Hamelin posted a .246 batting average with 67 home runs and 209 RBIs in 497 games played. In 1994, at the age of 26, he was the American League Rookie of the Year. His stint as a professional player was marred by leg injuries, both in the minors and majors. He also suffered from an eye problem.

== Playing career ==
=== High school and college ===
After a long and illustrious career in the Randolph Little League, Hamelin's family moved from their home in Randolph, New Jersey to Irvine, California, when he was 12 years old. Hamelin attended Irvine High School, where he excelled in both football and baseball, and was named the School's Athlete of the Year as a senior. The University of Notre Dame recruited him to play football, however Hamelin had already decided to pursue a career in baseball. Hamelin enrolled in Santa Ana College after graduating from high school and played on the school's baseball team. Soon thereafter the young baseball prospect transferred to UCLA, where he continued to play baseball for his new school. In 1987, he played collegiate summer baseball with the Harwich Mariners of the Cape Cod Baseball League.

=== Major leagues ===
Hamelin won the 1994 AL Rookie of the Year Award as a member of the Kansas City Royals, when he posted a .282 batting average and hit 24 home runs (earning him the nickname "the hammer") with 65 RBIs during the strike-shortened season.

=== After the major leagues ===
Hamelin abruptly quit his professional baseball career while playing in the minor leagues for the Toledo Mud Hens (Detroit Tigers AAA Team) in 1999. After grounding out, he went back to the dugout and told manager Gene Roof, "I'm done", ending his professional baseball career as a player.

After retirement Hamelin was out of professional baseball for several years, owning a manufacturing company. He attended scouting school and returned to professional baseball as a scout for the Washington Nationals and the Toronto Blue Jays. In 2012, he joined the Major League scouting corps of the Boston Red Sox. His scouting contract was not renewed by the Boston Red Sox for the 2021 season.

Hamelin's 1996 Pinnacle Foil baseball card is commonly referred to as the worst baseball card of all time. In 2019, Hamelin and a collection of his baseball cards were featured in the first episode of SB Nation's two part series "The Bob Emergency", narrated by Jon Bois.

== Highlights ==
- American League and TSN Rookie of the Year awards (1994)
- 5th in slugging percentage (AL 1994, .599)
- 5th in OPS (AL 1994, .987)
- 9th in home runs (AL 1994, 24)

Preceded by none	Players Choice AL Most Outstanding Rookie; 1994	Succeeded by Marty Cordova
