= The Sporting News Rookie of the Year Award =

American baseball award

Rookie of the Year Award
- Sport: Baseball
- League: Major League Baseball
- Awarded for: Most outstanding rookie in the American League and National League
- Country: United States, Canada
- Presented by: The Sporting News

History
- First award: 1946; NL: Del Ennis
- Most recent: 2026; NL: Sal Stewart; AL: Kevin McGonigle

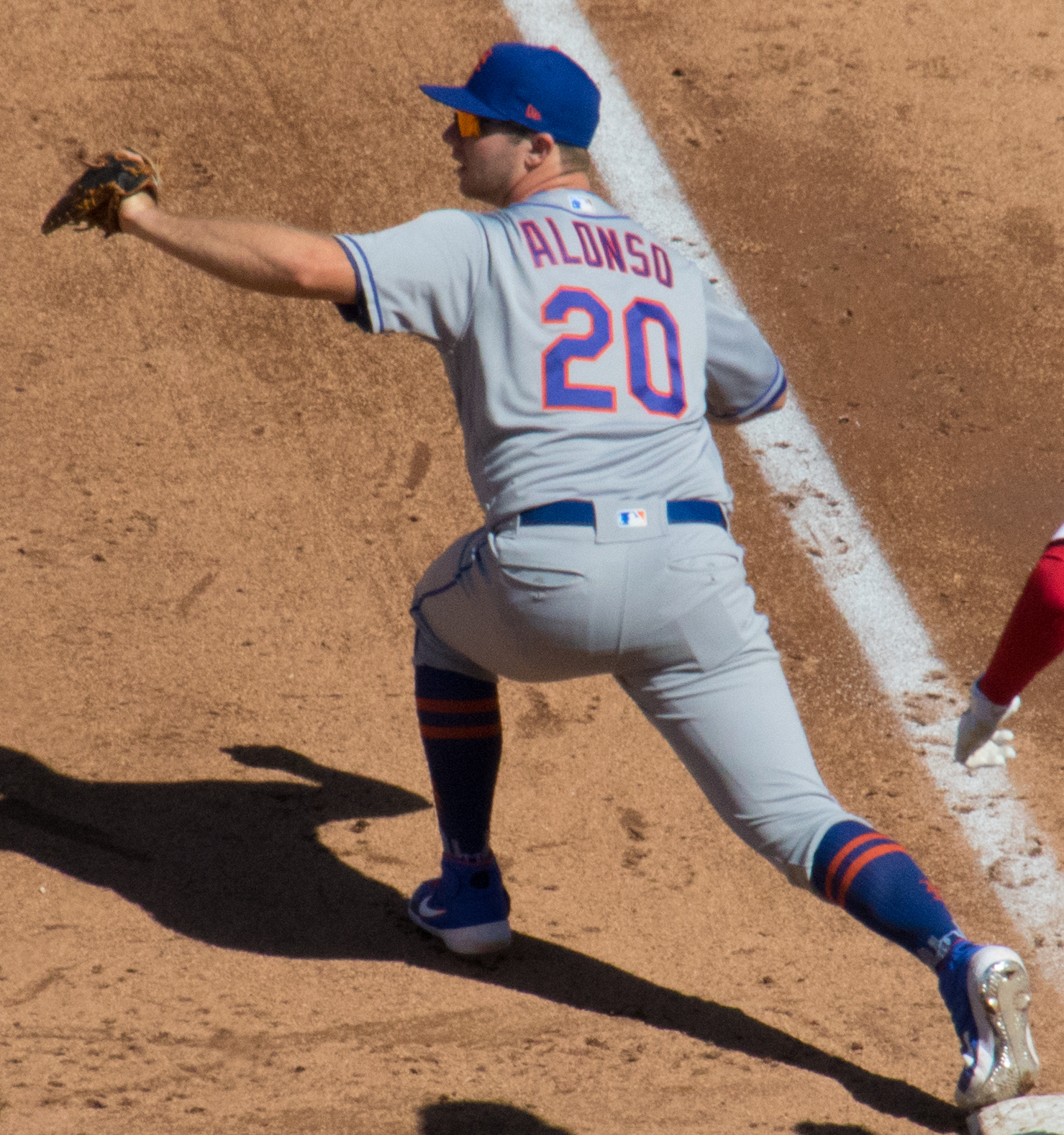
2019 NL winner Pete Alonso playing first base for the Mets at Nationals Park.

The Sporting News Rookie of the Year Award is an annual Major League Baseball (MLB) award established in 1946 by The Sporting News. For the first three years (1946–1948) and again in 1950, there was a single award. In 1949 and since 1951, the award has been given to a rookie from both the American League and National League. In 1961 and from 1963 through 2003, The Sporting News split the rookie award into two separate categories, Rookie Pitcher of the Year and Rookie Player of the Year (in each league). In 2004 those two awards were discontinued, in favor of a single award, one for each league.

Below is a list of winners by year, name, team, league, and position.

== Key ==
†	Also won Major League Baseball Rookie of the Year Award

== 1946–1949 ==
- 1946
  - Del Ennis (Philadelphia NL, OF)
- 1947
  - Jackie Robinson (Brooklyn NL, 1B)^{†}
- 1948
  - Richie Ashburn (Philadelphia NL, OF)
- 1949
  - Roy Sievers (St. Louis AL, OF)^{†}
  - Don Newcombe (Brooklyn NL, P)^{†}

== 1950–1959 ==
- 1950
  - Whitey Ford (New York AL, P)
- 1951
  - Minnie Miñoso (Chicago AL, OF)
  - Willie Mays (New York NL, OF)^{†}
- 1952
  - Clint Courtney (St. Louis AL, C)
  - Joe Black (Brooklyn NL, P)^{†}
- 1953
  - Harvey Kuenn (Detroit AL, SS)^{†}
  - Jim Gilliam (Brooklyn NL, 2B)^{†}
- 1954
  - Bob Grim (New York AL, P)^{†}
  - Wally Moon (St. Louis NL, OF)^{†}
- 1955
  - Herb Score (Cleveland AL, P)^{†}
  - Bill Virdon (St. Louis NL, OF)^{†}
- 1956
  - Luis Aparicio (Chicago AL, SS)^{†}
  - Frank Robinson (Cincinnati NL, OF)^{†}
- 1957
  - Tony Kubek (New York AL, IF-OF)^{†}
  - Ed Bouchee (Philadelphia NL, 1B)
  - Jack Sanford (Philadelphia NL, P)^{†}
- 1958
  - Ryne Duren (New York AL, P)
  - Albie Pearson (Washington AL, OF)^{†}
  - Orlando Cepeda (San Francisco NL, 1B)^{†}
  - Carlton Willey (Milwaukee NL, P)
- 1959
  - Bob Allison (Washington AL, OF)^{†}
  - Willie McCovey (San Francisco NL, 1B)^{†}

== 1960–1969 ==
- 1960
  - Ron Hansen (Baltimore AL, SS)^{†}
  - Frank Howard (Los Angeles NL, OF)^{†}
- 1961
  - Dick Howser (Kansas City AL, SS)
  - Don Schwall (Boston AL, P)^{†}
  - Ken Hunt (Cincinnati NL, P)
  - Billy Williams (Chicago NL, OF)^{†}
- 1962
  - Tom Tresh (New York AL, OF-SS)^{†}
  - Ken Hubbs (Chicago NL, 2B)^{†}
- 1963
  - Gary Peters (Chicago AL, P)^{†}
  - Pete Ward (Chicago AL, 3B)
  - Ray Culp (Philadelphia NL, P)
  - Pete Rose (Cincinnati NL, 2B)^{†}
- 1964
  - Wally Bunker (Baltimore AL, P)
  - Tony Oliva (Minnesota AL, OF)^{†}
  - Billy McCool (Cincinnati NL, P)
  - Dick Allen (Philadelphia NL, 3B)^{†}
- 1965
  - Marcelino López (California AL, P)
  - Curt Blefary (Baltimore AL, OF)^{†}
  - Frank Linzy (San Francisco NL, P)
  - Joe Morgan (Houston NL, 2B)
- 1966
  - Jim Nash (Kansas City AL, P)
  - Tommie Agee (Chicago AL, OF)^{†}
  - Don Sutton (Los Angeles NL, P)
  - Tommy Helms (Cincinnati NL, 3B)^{†}
- 1967
  - Tom Phoebus (Baltimore AL, P)
  - Rod Carew (Minnesota AL, 2B)^{†}
  - Dick Hughes (St. Louis NL, P)
  - Lee May (Cincinnati NL, 1B)
- 1968
  - Stan Bahnsen (New York AL, P)^{†}
  - Del Unser (Washington AL, OF)
  - Jerry Koosman (New York NL, P)
  - Johnny Bench (Cincinnati NL, C)^{†}
- 1969
  - Mike Nagy (Boston AL, P)
  - Carlos May (Chicago AL, OF)
  - Tom Griffin (Houston NL, P)
  - Coco Laboy (Montreal NL, 2B)

== 1970–1979 ==
- 1970
  - Bert Blyleven (Minnesota AL, P)
  - Roy Foster (Cleveland AL, OF)
  - Carl Morton (Montreal NL, P)^{†}
  - Bernie Carbo (Cincinnati NL, OF)
- 1971
  - Bill Parsons (Milwaukee AL, P)
  - Chris Chambliss (Cleveland AL, 1B)^{†}
  - Reggie Cleveland (St. Louis NL, P)
  - Earl Williams (Atlanta NL, C)^{†}
- 1972
  - Dick Tidrow (Cleveland AL, P)
  - Carlton Fisk (Boston AL, C)^{†}
  - Jon Matlack (New York NL, P)^{†}
  - Dave Rader (San Francisco NL, C)
- 1973
  - Steve Busby (Kansas City AL, P)
  - Al Bumbry (Baltimore AL, OF)^{†}
  - Steve Rogers (Montreal NL, P)
  - Gary Matthews (San Francisco NL, OF)^{†}
- 1974
  - Frank Tanana (California AL, P)
  - Mike Hargrove (Texas AL, 1B)^{†}
  - John D'Acquisto (San Francisco NL, P)
  - Greg Gross (Houston NL, OF)
- 1975
  - Dennis Eckersley (Cleveland AL, P)
  - Fred Lynn (Boston AL, OF)^{†}
  - John Montefusco (San Francisco NL, P)^{†}
  - Gary Carter (Montreal NL, OF-C)
- 1976
  - Mark Fidrych (Detroit AL, P)^{†}
  - Butch Wynegar (Minnesota AL, C)
  - Butch Metzger (San Diego NL, P)^{†}
  - Larry Herndon (San Francisco NL, OF)
- 1977
  - Dave Rozema (Detroit AL, P)
  - Mitchell Page (Oakland AL, OF)
  - Bob Owchinko (San Diego NL, P)
  - Andre Dawson (Montreal NL, OF)^{†}
- 1978
  - Rich Gale (Kansas City AL, P)
  - Paul Molitor (Milwaukee AL, 2B)
  - Don Robinson (Pittsburgh NL, P)
  - Bob Horner (Atlanta NL, 3B)^{†}
- 1979
  - Mark Clear (California AL, P)
  - Pat Putnam (Texas AL, 1B)
  - Rick Sutcliffe (Los Angeles NL, P)^{†}
  - Jeffrey Leonard (Houston NL, OF)

== 1980–1989 ==
- 1980
  - Britt Burns (Chicago AL, P)
  - Joe Charboneau (Cleveland AL, OF)^{†}
  - Bill Gullickson (Montreal NL, P)
  - Lonnie Smith, (Philadelphia NL, OF)
- 1981
  - Dave Righetti (New York AL, P)^{†}
  - Rich Gedman (Boston AL, C)
  - Fernando Valenzuela (Los Angeles NL, P)^{†}
  - Tim Raines (Montreal NL, OF)
- 1982
  - Ed Vande Berg (Seattle AL, P)
  - Cal Ripken Jr. (Baltimore AL, SS-3B)^{†}
  - Steve Bedrosian (Atlanta NL, P)
  - Johnny Ray (Pittsburgh NL, 2B)
- 1983
  - Mike Boddicker (Baltimore AL, P)
  - Ron Kittle (Chicago AL, OF)^{†}
  - Craig McMurtry (Atlanta NL, P)
  - Darryl Strawberry (New York NL, OF)^{†}
- 1984
  - Mark Langston (Seattle AL, P)
  - Alvin Davis (Seattle AL, 1B)^{†}
  - Dwight Gooden (New York NL, P)^{†}
  - Juan Samuel (Philadelphia NL, 2B)
- 1985
  - Teddy Higuera (Milwaukee AL, P)
  - Ozzie Guillén (Chicago AL, SS)^{†}
  - Tom Browning (Cincinnati NL, P)
  - Vince Coleman (St. Louis NL, OF)^{†}
- 1986
  - Mark Eichhorn (Toronto AL, P)
  - José Canseco (Oakland AL, OF)^{†}
  - Todd Worrell (St. Louis NL, P)^{†}
  - Robby Thompson (San Francisco NL, 2B)
- 1987
  - Mike Henneman (Detroit AL, P)
  - Mark McGwire (Oakland AL, 1B)^{†}
  - Mike Dunne (Pittsburgh NL, P)
  - Benito Santiago (San Diego NL, C)^{†}
- 1988
  - Bryan Harvey (California AL, P)
  - Walt Weiss (Oakland AL, SS)^{†}
  - Tim Belcher (Los Angeles NL, P)
  - Mark Grace (Chicago NL, 1B)
- 1989
  - Tom Gordon (Kansas City AL, P)
  - Craig Worthington (Baltimore AL, 3B)
  - Andy Benes (San Diego NL, P)
  - Jerome Walton (Chicago NL, OF)^{†}

== 1990–1999 ==
- 1990
  - Kevin Appier (Kansas City AL, P)
  - Sandy Alomar (Cleveland AL, C)^{†}
  - Mike Harkey (Chicago NL, P)
  - David Justice (Atlanta NL, OF)^{†}
- 1991
  - Juan Guzmán (Toronto AL, P)
  - Chuck Knoblauch (Minnesota AL, 2B)^{†}
  - Al Osuna (Houston NL, P)
  - Jeff Bagwell (Houston NL, 1B)^{†}
- 1992
  - Cal Eldred (Milwaukee AL, P)
  - Pat Listach (Milwaukee AL, SS)^{†}
  - Tim Wakefield (Pittsburgh NL, P)
  - Eric Karros (Los Angeles NL, 1B)^{†}
- 1993
  - Aaron Sele (Boston AL, P)
  - Tim Salmon (California AL, OF)^{†}
  - Kirk Rueter (Montreal NL, P)
  - Mike Piazza (Los Angeles NL, C)^{†}
- 1994
  - Brian Anderson (California AL, P)
  - Bob Hamelin (Kansas City AL, DH)^{†}
  - Steve Trachsel (Chicago NL, P)
  - Raúl Mondesí (Los Angeles NL, OF)^{†}
- 1995
  - Julián Tavárez (Cleveland AL, P)
  - Garret Anderson (California AL, OF)
  - Hideo Nomo (Los Angeles NL, P)^{†}
  - Chipper Jones (Atlanta NL, 3B)
- 1996
  - James Baldwin (Chicago AL, P)
  - Derek Jeter (New York AL, SS)^{†}
  - Alan Benes (St. Louis NL, P)
  - Jason Kendall (Pittsburgh NL, C)
- 1997
  - Jason Dickson (Anaheim AL, P)
  - Nomar Garciaparra (Boston AL, SS)^{†}
  - Matt Morris (St. Louis NL, P)
  - Scott Rolen (Philadelphia NL, 3B)^{†}
- 1998
  - Rolando Arrojo (Tampa Bay AL, P)
  - Ben Grieve (Oakland AL, OF)^{†}
  - Kerry Wood (Chicago NL, P)^{†}
  - Todd Helton (Colorado NL, 1B)
- 1999
  - Tim Hudson (Oakland AL, P)
  - Carlos Beltrán (Kansas City AL, OF)^{†}
  - Scott Williamson (Cincinnati NL, P)^{†}
  - Preston Wilson (Florida NL, OF)

== 2000–2009 ==
- 2000
  - Kazuhiro Sasaki (Seattle AL, P)^{†}
  - Mark Quinn (Kansas City AL, OF)
  - Rick Ankiel (St. Louis NL, P)
  - Rafael Furcal (Atlanta NL, SS)^{†}
- 2001
  - CC Sabathia (Cleveland AL, P)
  - Ichiro Suzuki (Seattle AL, OF)^{†}
  - Roy Oswalt (Houston NL, P)
  - Albert Pujols (St. Louis NL, 3B)^{†}
- 2002
  - Rodrigo López (Baltimore AL, P)
  - Eric Hinske (Toronto AL, 3B)^{†}
  - Jason Jennings (Colorado NL, P)^{†}
  - Brad Wilkerson (Montreal NL, OF)
- 2003
  - Rafael Soriano (Seattle AL, P)
  - Jody Gerut (Cleveland AL, OF)
  - Dontrelle Willis (Florida NL, P)^{†}
  - Scott Podsednik (Milwaukee NL, OF)
- 2004
  - Bobby Crosby (Oakland AL, SS)^{†}
  - Jason Bay (Pittsburgh NL, OF)^{†}
- 2005
  - Huston Street (Oakland AL, RP)^{†}
  - Willy Taveras (Houston NL, OF)
- 2006
  - Justin Verlander (Detroit AL, P)^{†}
  - Hanley Ramírez (Florida NL, SS)^{†}
- 2007
  - Dustin Pedroia (Boston AL, 2B)^{†}
  - Ryan Braun (Milwaukee NL, 3B)^{†}
- 2008
  - Evan Longoria (Tampa Bay AL, 3B)^{†}
  - Geovany Soto (Chicago NL, C)^{†}
- 2009
  - Andrew Bailey (Oakland AL, P)^{†}
  - J. A. Happ (Philadelphia NL, P)

== 2010–2019 ==
- 2010
  - Austin Jackson (Detroit AL, OF)
  - Jason Heyward (Atlanta NL, OF)
- 2011
  - Mark Trumbo (Los Angeles AL, 1B)
  - Craig Kimbrel (Atlanta NL, P)^{†}
- 2012
  - Mike Trout (Los Angeles AL, OF)^{†}
  - Wade Miley (Arizona NL, P)
- 2013
  - Wil Myers (Tampa Bay AL, OF)^{†}
  - José Fernández (Miami NL, P)^{†}
- 2014
  - José Abreu (Chicago AL, 1B)^{†}
  - Jacob deGrom (New York NL, P)^{†}
- 2015
  - Carlos Correa (Houston AL, SS)^{†}
  - Kris Bryant (Chicago NL, 3B)^{†}
- 2016
  - Michael Fulmer (Detroit AL, P)^{†}
  - Corey Seager (Los Angeles NL, SS)^{†}
- 2017
  - Aaron Judge (New York AL, OF)^{†}
  - Cody Bellinger (Los Angeles NL, 1B/OF)^{†}
- 2018
  - Shohei Ohtani (Los Angeles AL, P/DH)^{†}
  - Ronald Acuna (Atlanta NL, OF)^{†}
- 2019
  - Yordan Alvarez (Houston AL, OF/DH)^{†}
  - Pete Alonso (New York NL, 1B)^{†}

== 2020–present ==
Year	Name	Club	League	Pos	Notes	References
2020	Kyle Lewis	Seattle Mariners	AL	OF	BA: .262, OBP: .364, SLG: .437, OPS: .801, 2B: 3, HR: 11, RBI: 28, SB: 5	
2020	Jake Cronenworth	San Diego Padres	NL	2B	BA: .285, OBP: .354, SLG: .477, OPS: .831, 2B: 15, 3B: 3, HR: 4, RBI: 20, SB: 3	
2021	Adolis Garcia	Texas Rangers	AL	OF	BA: .243, OBP: .286, SLG: .454, OPS: .741, 2B: 26, 3B: 2, HR: 31, RBI: 90, SB: 16	
2021	Jonathan India	Cincinnati Reds	NL	2B	BA: .269, OBP: .376, SLG: .459, OPS: .835, 2B: 34, 3B: 2, HR: 21, RBI: 69, SB: 12	
2022	Julio Rodriguez	Seattle Mariners	AL	SS	BA: .284, OBP: .345, SLG: .509, OPS: .853, 2B: 25, 3B: 3, HR: 28, RBI: 75, SB: 25	
2022	Spencer Strider	Atlanta Braves	NL	P	W–L: 11–5, ERA: 2.61, K: 202, IP: 131.2	
2023	Gunnar Henderson	Baltimore Orioles	AL	2B	BA: .255, OBP: .345, SLG: .489, OPS: .814, 2B: 29, 3B: 9, HR: 28, RBI: 82, SB: 10	
2023	Corbin Carroll	Arizona Diamondbacks	NL	OF	BA: .285, OBP: .362, SLG: .506, OPS: .868, 2B: 30, 3B: 10, HR: 25, RBI: 76, SB: 54	
2024	Mason Miller	Oakland Athletics	AL	RP	Saves: 28, ERA: 2.49, WHIP: 0.877	
2024	Jackson Merrill	San Diego Padres	NL	OF	BA: .292, OBP: .326, SLG: .500, OPS: .826, 2B: 31, 3B: 6, HR: 24, RBI: 90	
2025	Nick Kurtz	Oakland Athletics	AL	1B	BA: .290, OBP: .383, SLG: .619, OPS: 1.002, 2B: 26, 3B: 2, HR: 36, RBI: 86	
2025	Cade Horton	Chicago Cubs	NL	SP	W–L: 11–4, ERA: 2.67, K: 97, IP: 118.0	
2026	Kevin McGonigle	Detroit Tigers	AL	SS	BA: .278, OBP: .376, SLG: .430, OPS: .806, 2B: 28, 3B: 5, HR: 18, RBI: 72	
2026	Sal Stewart	Cincinnati Reds	NL	OF	BA: .263, OBP: .330, SLG: .457, OPS: .787, 2B: 25, 3B: 0, HR: 32, RBI: 111	

== See also ==
- Major League Baseball Rookie of the Year Award (in each league)
- MLB Rookie of the Month Award
- "Esurance MLB Awards" Best Rookie (in MLB)
- "Players Choice Awards" Outstanding Rookie (in each league)
- Baseball America Rookie of the Year (in MLB)
- Baseball awards § United States
- List of MLB awards
- TSN Player of the Year
- TSN Pitcher of the Year
- SN Reliever of the Year
- TSN Comeback Player of the Year
- TSN Manager of the Year
- TSN Executive of the Year
