= Al Osuna =

American baseball player (born 1965)

- Pitcher
- Born: August 10, 1965 (age 60); Inglewood, California, U.S.
- Batted: Right Threw: Left

MLB debut
- September 2, 1990, for the Houston Astros

Last MLB appearance
- September 27, 1996, for the San Diego Padres

MLB statistics
- Win–loss record: 18–10
- Earned run average: 3.83
- Strikeouts: 143
- Stats at Baseball Reference

Teams
- Houston Astros (1990–1993); Los Angeles Dodgers (1994); San Diego Padres (1996)

Alfonso Osuna Jr. (born August 10, 1965) is an American former professional baseball player who pitched in Major League Baseball from 1990 to 1994 and in 1996. He played for the Houston Astros, Los Angeles Dodgers and San Diego Padres.

Osuna attended Gahr High School in Cerritos, California, then played college baseball first at Cerritos College before transferring to Stanford University. He helped the Cardinal baseball team win the 1987 College World Series, throwing 8 2/3 innings of scoreless relief to defeat Texas in the semifinals.

The Astros drafted Osuna in the 16th round of the 1987 MLB draft. He made his MLB debut as a September call-up in 1990. He pitched in a career-high 71 games with 12 saves in 1991. He earned a win against his hometown team, the Dodgers, in August, striking out Darryl Strawberry in two scoreless innings. In September, however, Strawberry hit a home run off Osuna after three inside pitches. After the season, Osuna was named the Sporting News National League Rookie Pitcher of the Year and selected to the Topps All-Star Rookie Team.

In March 1994, the Astros traded Osuna to the Dodgers for minor league pitcher Jimmy Daspit. He pitched in 15 games for Los Angeles and was released before the 1995 season started. He played in the New York Mets minor league system that year, then signed with the Padres on August 1, 1996. He pitched in 10 games for San Diego, facing 20 batters while working primarily as a left-handed specialist in his final major league action. He also pitched for the Rio Grande Valley WhiteWings of the independent Texas-Louisiana League in 1995 and 1996. Osuna briefly pitched for the Mercuries Tigers of the Chinese Professional Baseball League in Taiwan in 1998.

== See also ==
- Houston Astros award winners and league leaders
