= Jonathan India =

American baseball player (born 1996)

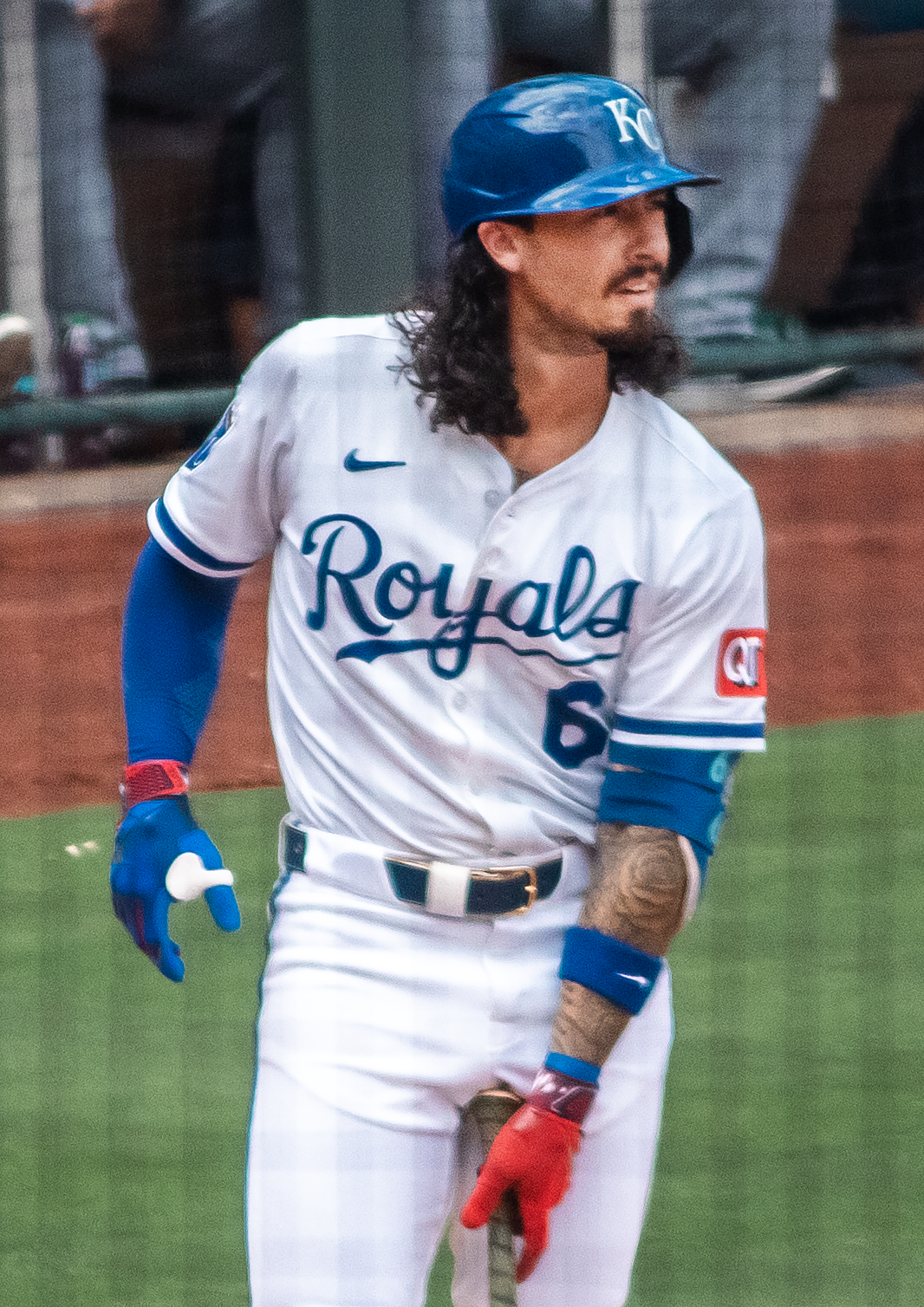
- India with the Kansas City Royals in 2025

Free agent
- Second baseman / Third baseman / Left fielder
- Born: December 15, 1996 (age 29); Fort Lauderdale, Florida, U.S.
- Bats: Right Throws: Right

MLB debut
- April 1, 2021, for the Cincinnati Reds

MLB statistics (through 2026 season)
- Batting average: .247
- Home runs: 74
- Runs batted in: 282
- Stats at Baseball Reference

Teams
- Cincinnati Reds (2021–2024); Kansas City Royals (2025–2026)

Career highlights and awards
- NL Rookie of the Year (2021)

Jonathan Joseph India (born December 15, 1996) is an American professional baseball second baseman, third baseman and left fielder who is a free agent. He has played in Major League Baseball (MLB) for the Cincinnati Reds and Kansas City Royals.

While playing college baseball for the Florida Gators, India was named an All-American in 2018 and won the Southeastern Conference Player of the Year in 2018. He was selected by the Reds with the fifth overall selection in the 2018 MLB draft. India made his MLB debut in 2021 and won the National League Rookie of the Year award.

== Amateur career ==
India attended American Heritage School in Delray Beach, Florida. He was drafted by the Milwaukee Brewers in the 26th round of the 2015 Major League Baseball draft, but did not sign and attended the University of Florida, where he played college baseball for the Florida Gators baseball team.

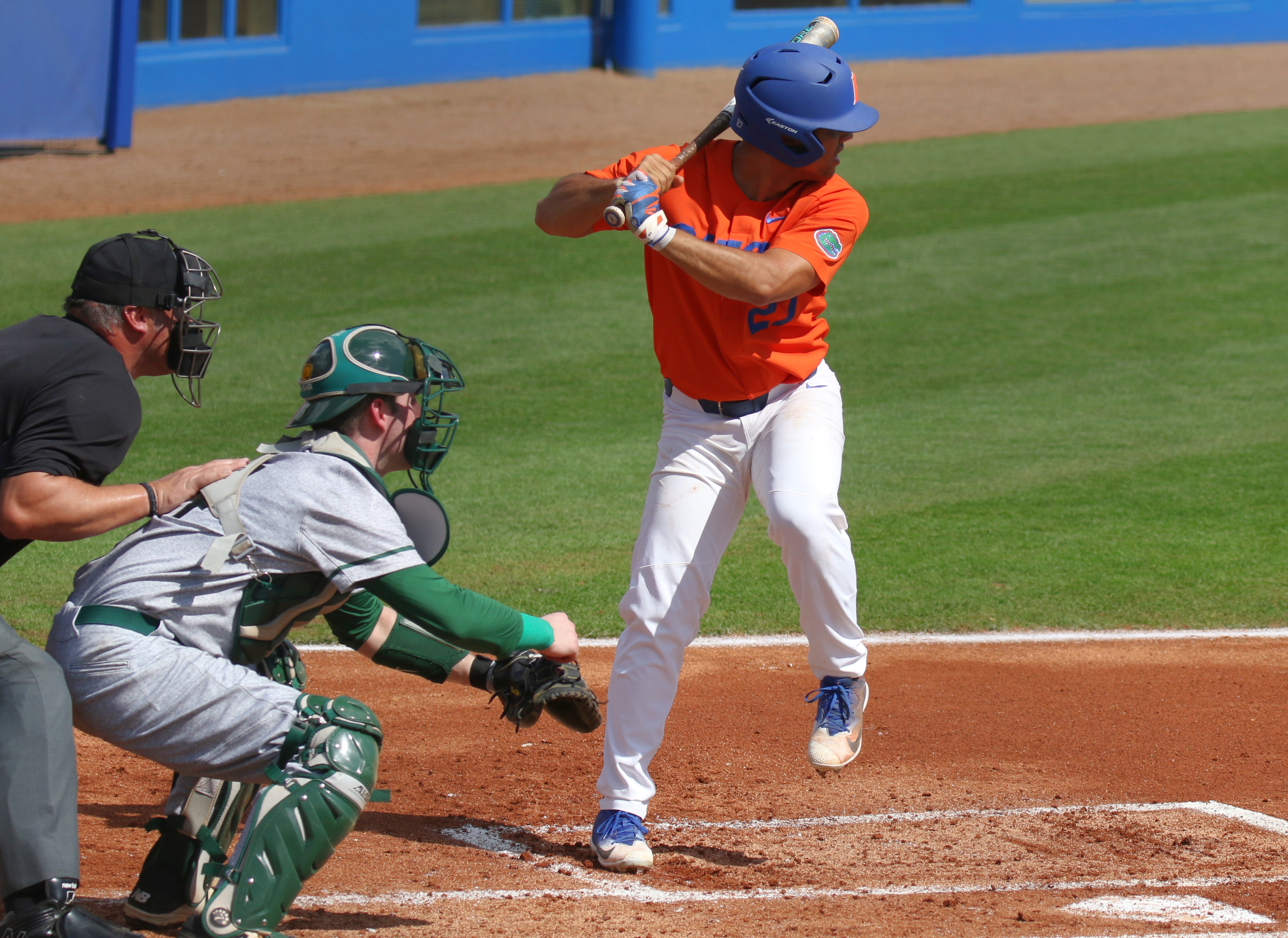
India batting for the Florida Gators in 2018

As a freshman at the University of Florida in 2016, India had a .303 batting average, a .367 on-base percentage (OBP), and a .440 SLG, with four home runs and 40 runs batted in (RBI). He was named a freshman All-American by Louisville Slugger. and the Southeastern Conference (SEC) First Team All-Freshman Team. Following his freshman season at Florida, India played collegiate summer baseball for the Harwich Mariners of the Cape Cod Baseball League, where he batted 18-for-62 (.290) with seven doubles and 4 RBIs.

As a sophomore in 2017, he hit .274/.354/.429 with six home runs and 34 RBI and was a member of Florida's 2017 College World Series winning team. He missed some of the beginning of the season due to an arm injury. India again played for the Mariners in the Cape Cod League after the season.

As a junior in 2018, India batted .350/.497/.717 with 21 home runs which was sixth in the nation. India won the Southeastern Conference Baseball Player of the Year, which is awarded to the top player in the SEC. He was also named a Baseball America All-American.

== Professional career ==
=== Cincinnati Reds ===
==== Minor leagues ====
India was considered one of the top prospects for the 2018 Major League Baseball draft, and was selected fifth overall by the Cincinnati Reds. India signed with the Reds for $5.3 million, and began his professional career with the Greeneville Reds of the Rookie League Appalachian League, where he batted .261 with three home runs. He was moved to the Billings Mustangs of the Pioneer League on July 26 to get playing time at shortstop. He hit .250 with two singles in three games for Billings. On July 30, India was promoted to the Single–A Midwest League Dayton Dragons and ended the season there, batting .229 with three home runs and 11 RBI in 27 games.

India began 2019 with the Daytona Tortugas of the High–A Florida State League (FSL). In June, he participated in the FSL All-Star game. On July 22, the Reds promoted India to the Chattanooga Lookouts of the Double–A Southern League after batting .256 with 8 home runs and 30 RBI in 87 games with Daytona. Baseball America named him the No. 51 prospect in 2019. After the season, he played in Arizona Fall League (AFL). He in the AFL after hitting .133/.254/.333 with three home runs in 18 games.

India did not participate in any games during the 2020 season due to the cancellation of the minor league season because of the COVID-19 pandemic.

==== Major leagues ====
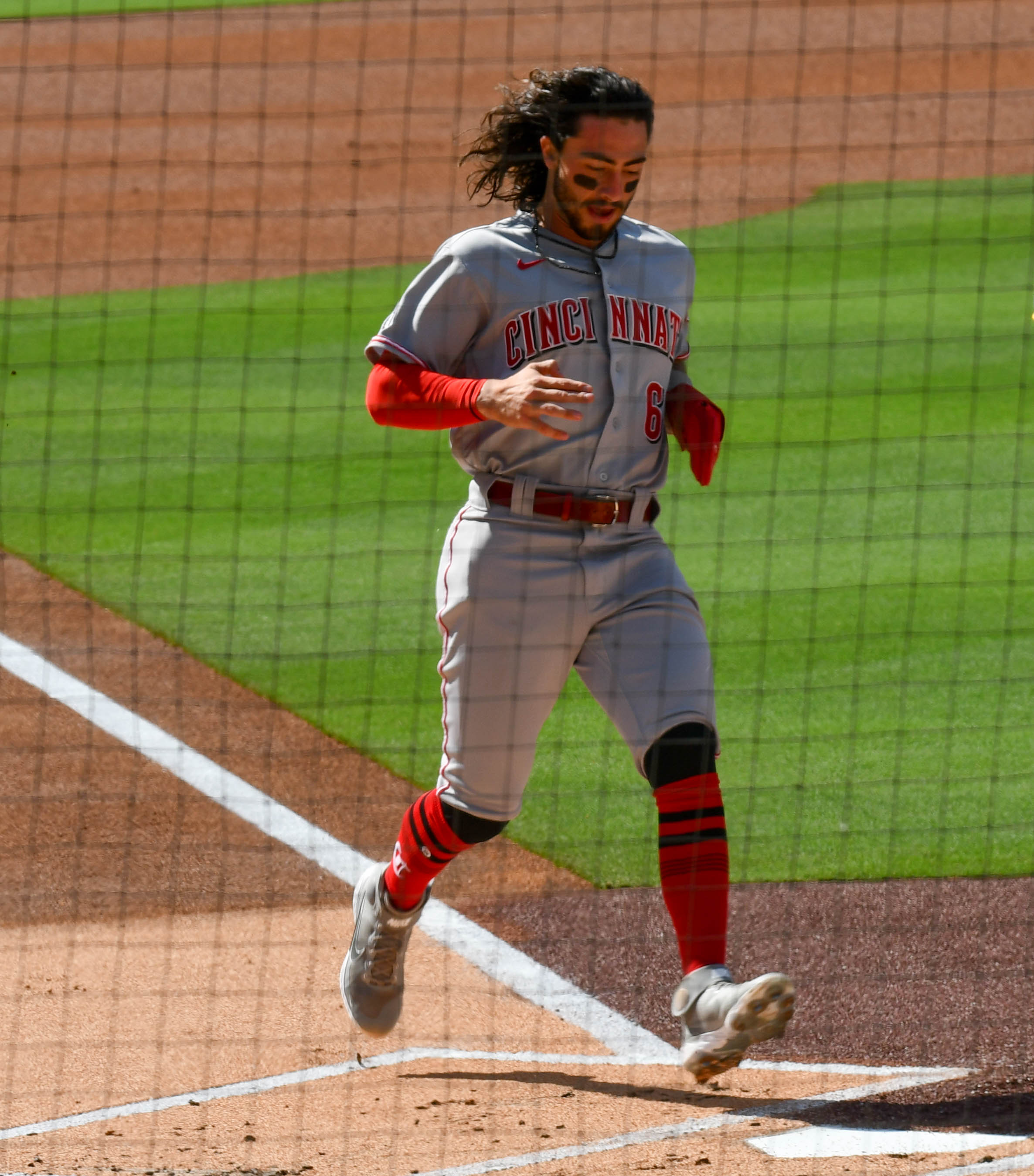
India scoring a run in 2021

===== 2021 season =====
On March 31, 2021, the Reds announced India would make his major league debut on Opening Day after being selected to make the team by way of a strong showing in spring training. Buzz about the move surfaced several days prior to the announcement, after his mother prematurely congratulated him on Instagram. On April 1, India was formally selected to the 40-man roster, and made his major league debut as the Opening Day starting second baseman. After striking out in his first at–bat, India got his first major league hit in his second, a double down the left field line off of St. Louis Cardinals starting pitcher Jack Flaherty, and also collected a single off of Ryan Helsley in at bat number three. India established a Reds rookie record by recording 7 RBI in the first five games of his career.

On April 22, 2021, India hit his first career home run at home against the Arizona Diamondbacks. On July 30, India had his first multi-home run game, hitting two homers to help beat the New York Mets, 6–2. On August 4, 2021, India was awarded July NL Rookie of the Month. India slashed .319/.470/.527 with four home runs and 12 RBIs over 25 games. India finished the 2021 season batting .269/.376/.459 with 21 home runs, 69 RBIs and 98 runs scored. He swung at a lower percentage of pitches in the strike zone than any other major leaguer, at 58.2%.

India was named the Baseball America Rookie of the Year for the 2021 season. India won the Sporting News Rookie of the Year Award for the National League, becoming the first Red to earn it since Scott Williamson in 1999. Further, he was nearly the unanimous winner from the Baseball Writers' Association of America (BBWAA) of the Jackie Robinson National League Rookie of the Year Award. He was also named by his fellow players as the "Players Choice Awards" National League Outstanding Rookie. He won the NL Rookie of the Year Award in a near unanimous-vote, receiving 29 of 30 first-place votes.

===== 2022–2024 =====
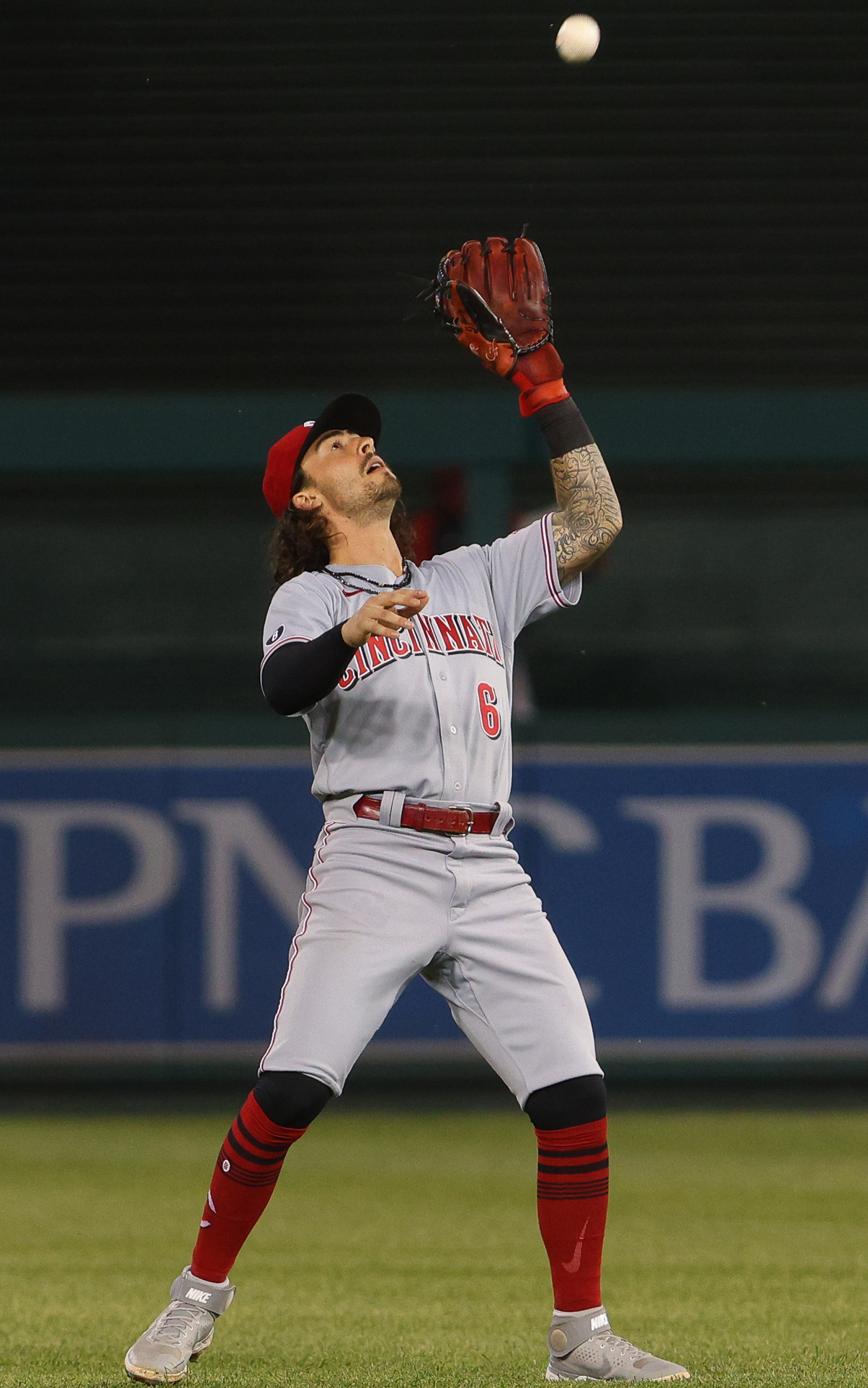
India with the Reds in 2021.

The Reds and India agreed to a $760,000 salary for the 2022 season, a 33% increase over his rookie salary. On April 16, against the Colorado Rockies, India left the game with a right hamstring injury, and was placed on the injured list (IL). After returning on April 26, he went back on the IL on May 1. The injury kept India sidelined throughout May, until he was able to begin a rehab assignment on June 7. He hit a fifth-inning grand slam off Zach Pop of the Miami Marlins on July 25, his first career grand slam.

On August 13, against the Chicago Cubs during the Field of Dreams Game, India was hit by a pitch in his calf, which later caused him to be airlifted to a local hospital due to compartment syndrome. Medical staff told India that if his injury had gone untreated for much longer, he potentially could have suffered permanent loss of at least part of his calf muscle. On September 3, against the Rockies, India recorded his first career walk-off hit, a single off of Alex Colomé. India finished the regular season with a .249 average, 10 home runs, and 41 RBIs.

India hit for 17 home runs, 61 RBI, and a .244 average in 119 games in 2023. India and the Reds agreed to a two-year contract on February 9, 2024, and avoided salary arbitration. In 151 games for Cincinnati, he slashed .248/.357/.392 with 15 home runs, 58 RBI, and 13 stolen bases. In October 2024, India underwent ankle surgery.

=== Kansas City Royals ===
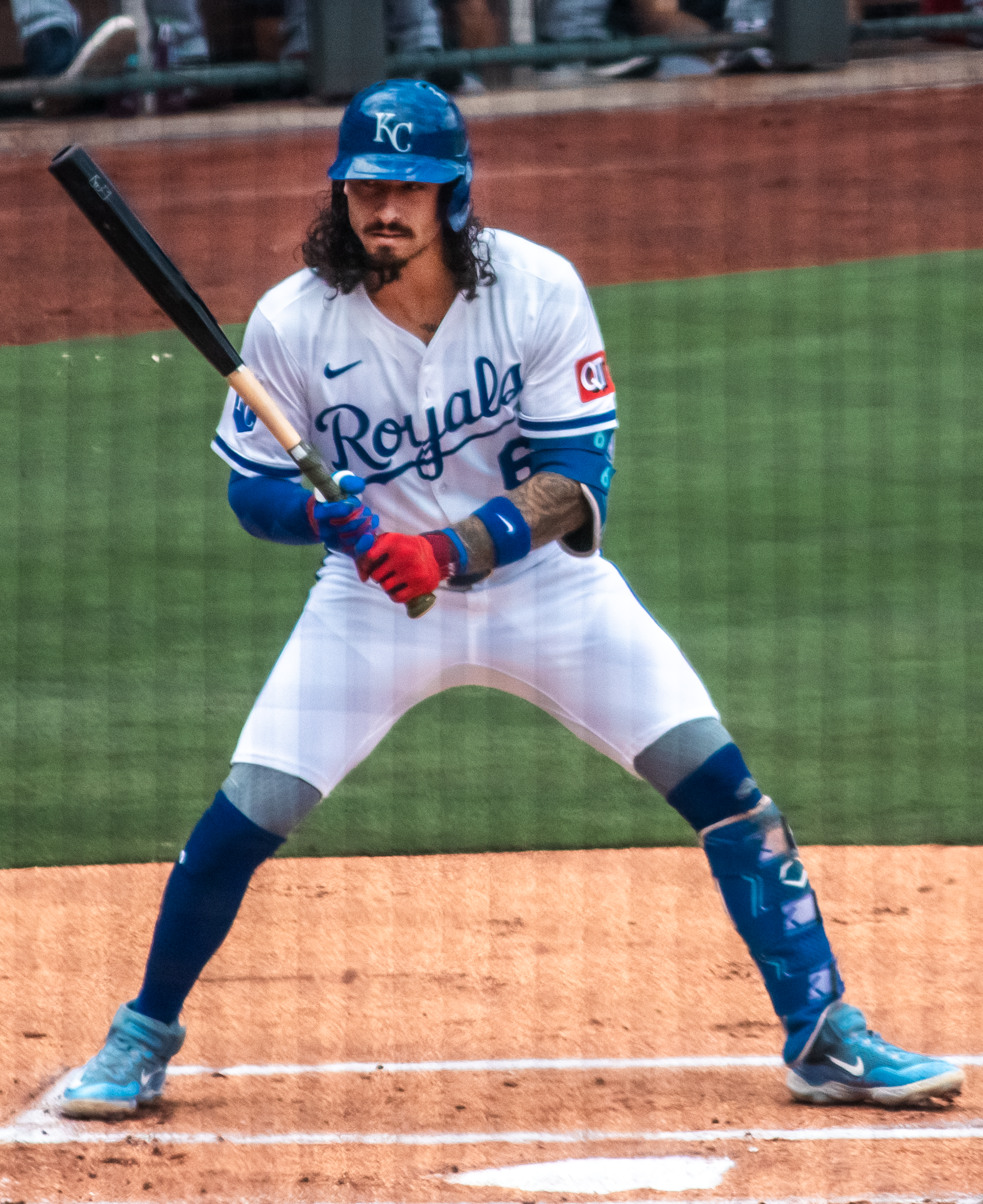
Royals vs Cleveland July 2025

On November 22, 2024, the Reds traded India and Joey Wiemer to the Kansas City Royals in exchange for Brady Singer. On April 25, 2025, India recorded his 500th career hit with a single to left field against the Houston Astros. On July 26, in Game 1 of a doubleheader against the Cleveland Guardians, India hit a three-run walk-off home run off closer Emmanuel Clase to give the Royals a 5-3 extra innings victory. It was the first walk-off homer of his career. In 136 appearances for Kansas City during the regular season, India batted .233/.323/.346 with nine home runs and 45 RBI.

India made 17 appearances for the Royals during the 2026 season, slashing .167/.310/.313 with two home runs and eight RBI. On April 28, 2026, it was announced that India had undergone season-ending surgery to repair a labrum injury in his left shoulder.

== Personal life ==
India is of Colombian descent through his mother, and was called up to the Colombia national baseball team for the 2023 World Baseball Classic. However, he did not participate in the tournament after electing to stay in spring training with the Reds while he negotiated a contract to avoid arbitration.

India and his wife, Danielle, have one daughter.
