= Ryan Mountcastle =

American baseball player (born 1997)

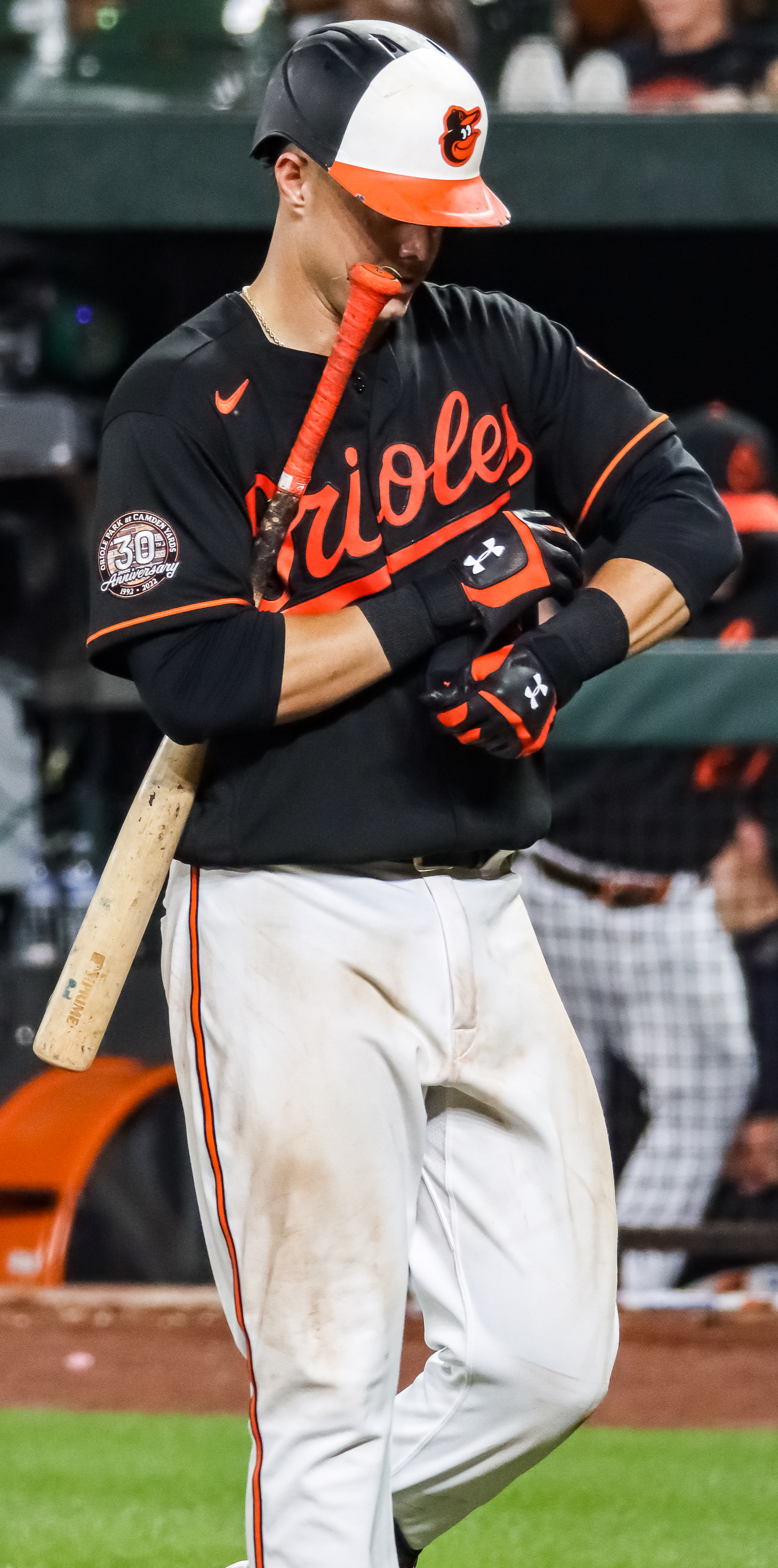
- Mountcastle with the Baltimore Orioles in 2022

Free agent
- First baseman
- Born: February 18, 1997 (age 29); Winter Springs, Florida, U.S.
- Bats: Right Throws: Right

MLB debut
- August 21, 2020, for the Baltimore Orioles

MLB statistics (through 2026 season)
- Batting average: .263
- Home runs: 98
- Runs batted in: 364
- Stats at Baseball Reference

Teams
- Baltimore Orioles (2020–2026)

Ryan Lee Mountcastle (born February 18, 1997) is an American professional baseball first baseman who is a free agent. He has previously played in Major League Baseball (MLB) for the Baltimore Orioles. He made his MLB debut in 2020.

== Amateur career ==
Mountcastle attended Hagerty High School in Oviedo, Florida. He was drafted by the Baltimore Orioles in the first round with the 36th overall selection of the 2015 Major League Baseball draft. He signed for $1.3 million, forgoing his commitment to play college baseball at the University of Central Florida.

== Professional career ==
=== Minor leagues ===
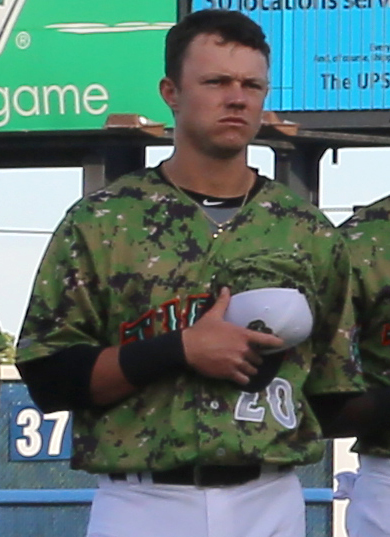
Mountcastle with the Norfolk Tides in 2019

Mountcastle signed with the Orioles and was assigned to the Gulf Coast League Orioles to begin his professional career. After batting .313 with three home runs and 14 RBI in 43 games in the GCL, he was promoted to the Aberdeen IronBirds, where he batted .212 in ten games to finish the season. In 2016, Mountcastle spent the season with the Delmarva Shorebirds where he posted a .281 average with ten home runs and 51 RBI along with a .745 OPS in 115 games. In 2017, Mountcastle spent time between the Frederick Keys and the Bowie Baysox, batting a combined .287 along with a career high 18 home runs and 62 RBI in 127 games between both teams. After the season, he played in the Arizona Fall League and played in the Fall Stars Game.

MLB.com ranked Mountcastle as Baltimore's third best prospect going into the 2018 season. He spent 2018 with Bowie, slashing .297/.341/.464 with 13 home runs and 59 RBI in 102 games. In 2019, Mountcastle spent the season with the Norfolk Tides, and switched to first base. After slashing .312/.344/.527 with 25 home runs and 83 RBI over 127 games, he was named the International League Most Valuable Player. Following the season, he was added to the Orioles 40–man roster in order to be protected from the Rule 5 draft.

=== Major leagues ===
On August 21, 2020, Mountcastle was promoted to the major leagues and made his MLB debut same day. On August 22, Mountcastle had his first major league hit against the Boston Red Sox in the bottom of the ninth inning. On August 30, he hit his first MLB home run. On the season for Baltimore, Mountcastle slashed .333/.386/.492 with five home runs and 23 RBI over 35 games.

Mountcastle returned to Baltimore for the 2021 season as their starting first baseman and also spent time in left field and as their designated hitter. On June 7, 2021, Mountcastle was named American League Player of the Week, after hitting safely in all six games he played in, and going 11-for-24 (.458) with four home runs, three doubles, ten RBI, and a 1.563 OPS. On June 19, Mountcastle had his first career three-home run game against the Toronto Blue Jays, launching two off of Toronto starter Alek Manoah and one off of reliever Anthony Kay. Over 144 games for the season, he slashed .255/.309/.487 with 33 home runs, 89 RBI, and 23 doubles. His 33 home runs were the most ever by an Orioles rookie, and he led the major leagues in home runs by a rookie.

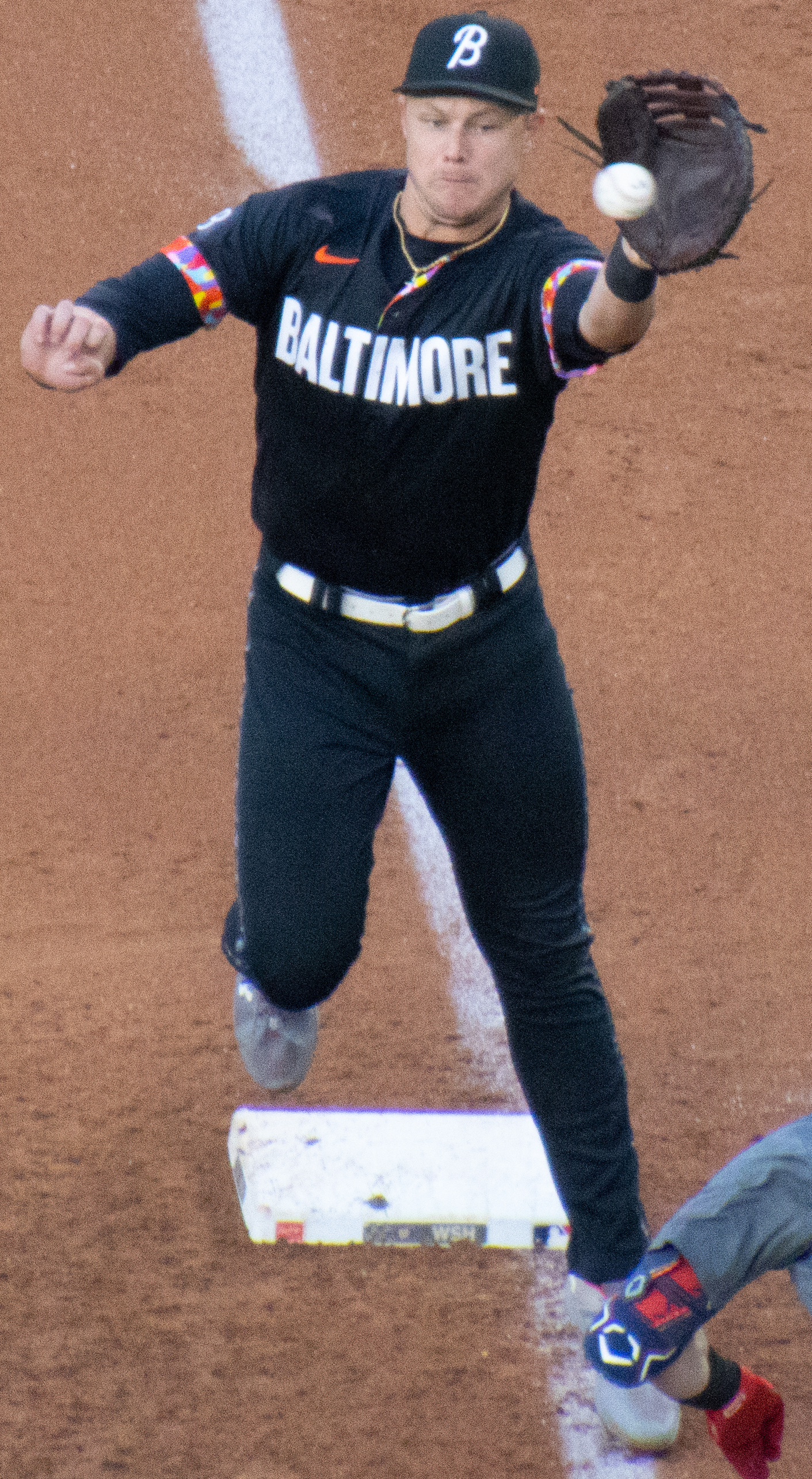
Mountcastle in May 2024

Mountcastle made 145 appearances for the Orioles during the 2022 campaign, batting .250/.305/.423 with 22 home runs and 85 RBI. On April 11, 2023, Mountcastle tied an Orioles record with nine RBI in a 12–8 win over the Oakland Athletics. On August 8, he hit a 472–foot home run off of Framber Valdez of the Houston Astros. The two–run shot served as the furthest home run at Camden Yards by an Oriole in the Statcast era (since 2015). Mountcastle made 115 appearances for the Orioles during the year, hitting .270/.328/.452 with 18 home runs and 68 RBI.

Mountcastle had a pair of home runs and five RBI in a 10–1 away victory over the Blue Jays on June 4, 2024. The performance continued his career offensive dominance over the Blue Jays. Mountcastle played in 124 games for the Orioles in the regular season, slashing .271/.308/.425 with 13 home runs and 63 RBI.

Mountcastle played in 52 games for Baltimore to begin the 2025 season, hitting .246 with two home runs and 15 RBI. On June 6, 2025, it was announced that Mountcastle would miss 8-to-12 weeks due to a Grade 2 strain of his right hamstring. He was transferred to the 60-day injured list on June 23. On August 8, Mountcastle was activated from the injured list. In 89 total games for Baltimore, he batted .250/.286/.367 with seven home runs, 35 RBI, and three stolen bases.

On April 13, 2026, Mountcastle was placed on the 60-day injured list after suffering a fractured fourth metatarsal bone in his left foot. On July 31, while warming up for his first minor league rehab game, Mountcastle suffered a significant oblique strain. On November 2, the Orioles declined their club option on Mountcastle making him a free agent.
