= Baseball America Rookie of the Year Award =

Baseball award

The Baseball America Rookie of the Year Award is an annual award granted by Baseball America to the best rookie in the major leagues.

== Awardees ==
Year	Winner	Position	Team	Ref
1989	Gregg Olson	Pitcher	Baltimore Orioles	
1990	Sandy Alomar Jr.	Catcher	Cleveland Indians	
1991	Jeff Bagwell	First baseman	Houston Astros	
1992	Pat Listach	Shortstop	Milwaukee Brewers	
1993	Mike Piazza	Catcher	Los Angeles Dodgers	
1994	Raúl Mondesí	Outfielder	Los Angeles Dodgers	
1995	Hideo Nomo	Pitcher	Los Angeles Dodgers	
1996	Derek Jeter	Shortstop	New York Yankees	
1997	Nomar Garciaparra	Shortstop	Boston Red Sox	
1998	Kerry Wood	Pitcher	Chicago Cubs	
1999	Carlos Beltrán	Outfielder	Kansas City Royals	
2000	Rafael Furcal	Shortstop	Atlanta Braves	
2001	Albert Pujols	Third baseman	St. Louis Cardinals	
2002	Eric Hinske	Third baseman	Toronto Blue Jays	
2003	Brandon Webb	Pitcher	Arizona Diamondbacks	
2004	Khalil Greene	Shortstop	San Diego Padres	
2005	Huston Street	Pitcher	Oakland Athletics	
2006	Justin Verlander	Pitcher	Detroit Tigers	
2007	Ryan Braun	Third baseman	Milwaukee Brewers	
2008	Geovany Soto	Catcher	Chicago Cubs	
2009	Andrew McCutchen	Outfielder	Pittsburgh Pirates	
2010	Jason Heyward	Right fielder	Atlanta Braves	
2011	Jeremy Hellickson	Pitcher	Tampa Bay Rays	
2012	Mike Trout	Outfielder	Los Angeles Angels of Anaheim	
2013	Jose Fernandez	Pitcher	Miami Marlins	
2014	José Abreu	First baseman	Chicago White Sox	
2015	Kris Bryant	Third baseman	Chicago Cubs	
2016	Corey Seager	Shortstop	Los Angeles Dodgers	
2017	Aaron Judge	Outfielder	New York Yankees	
2018	Shohei Ohtani	Pitcher	Los Angeles Angels	
2019	Pete Alonso	First baseman	New York Mets	
2020	Tony Gonsolin	Pitcher	Los Angeles Dodgers	
2021	Jonathan India	Second baseman	Cincinnati Reds	
2022	Julio Rodriguez	Center fielder	Seattle Mariners	
2023	Corbin Carroll	Outfielder	Arizona Diamondbacks	
2024	Paul Skenes	Pitcher	Pittsburgh Pirates	
2025	Nick Kurtz	First baseman	Athletics	

== See also ==
- Baseball America § Baseball America All-Rookie Team
- Jackie Robinson Rookie of the Year Award (MLB; in each league)
- "Esurance MLB Awards" Best Rookie (in MLB)
- "Players Choice Awards" Outstanding Rookie (in each league)
- Sporting News Rookie of the Year Award
- Rookie of the Month
- Baseball awards § United States
- List of MLB awards
