= Cade Horton =

American baseball player (born 2001)

Chicago Cubs – No. 22
- Pitcher
- Born: August 20, 2001 (age 24); Oklahoma City, Oklahoma, U.S.
- Bats: Right Throws: Right

MLB debut
- May 10, 2025, for the Chicago Cubs

MLB statistics (through 2026 season)
- Win–loss record: 12–4
- Earned run average: 2.66
- Strikeouts: 101
- Stats at Baseball Reference

Teams
- Chicago Cubs (2025–present)

Cade Michael Horton (born August 20, 2001) is an American professional baseball pitcher for the Chicago Cubs of Major League Baseball (MLB). Horton played college baseball for the Oklahoma Sooners and was selected by the Cubs in the first round with the seventh overall selection in the 2022 MLB draft. He made his MLB debut in 2025.

== Early life ==
Horton was born August 20, 2001, in Oklahoma City, Oklahoma, and was raised in Norman, Oklahoma, by his parents Mike and Cari. He followed his older brother Cale into baseball but took up American football as well. Horton attended Norman High School, where he played baseball and football. Horton committed to play college baseball at Oklahoma and to join the school's football team as a walk-on. In his senior football season, he passed for 3,084 yards and 26 touchdowns with seven interceptions and also rushed for 1,149 yards and 15 touchdowns. Horton was named the Oklahoma Gatorade Player of the Year in baseball after batting .375 in five games before the 2020 season was canceled due to COVID-19.

== College career ==
Horton tore the ulnar collateral ligament in his pitching elbow prior to the start of his freshman season (2021), requiring him to undergo Tommy John surgery and redshirt the year. He then began his redshirt freshman season playing third base and occasionally pitching in relief while he was still recovering from his elbow surgery. Horton was later moved to the Sooners' starting rotation. He reached the 2022 Men's College World Series with the Sooners, where he started in two games. In the MCWS Finals game versus Ole Miss he registered a career high 13 strikeouts in 7.1 innings.

== Professional career ==
=== Minor leagues (2022–2025) ===
Horton was selected in the first round with the seventh overall selection by the Chicago Cubs of the 2022 Major League Baseball draft. He signed with the team for $4.45 million.

Horton made his professional debut in 2023, splitting the season between the Single-A Myrtle Beach Pelicans, High-A South Bend Cubs, and Double-A Tennessee Smokies. In 21 starts for the three affiliates, he posted a cumulative 4-4 record and 2.65 ERA with 117 strikeouts across 88 1/3 innings pitched.

Horton split the 2024 season between Tennessee and the Triple-A Iowa Cubs, accumulating a 2-1 record and 4.46 ERA with 40 strikeouts over nine starts; a significant shoulder injury limited his availability during the year. Horton started the 2025 season at Triple-A Iowa as the top pitching prospect on the team. He went 2-1 with a 1.24 ERA in six starts.

=== Major leagues (2025–present) ===
On May 10, 2025, Horton was promoted to the major leagues for the first time. Horton made his MLB debut that day against the New York Mets, pitching four innings in relief. He allowed three runs on four hits while striking out five batters, earning his first career win. After pitching to just a 4.45 ERA through his first 10 starts, Horton dominated after the All-Star break. In 12 starts from July 20 through the end of his season, he went 8-1 with a 1.03 ERA, allowing just seven earned runs in 61 1/3 innings. Unfortunately, Horton left his final start of the regular season against the Mets and it was revealed he had a fractured rib, causing him to miss the remainder of the regular season, and postseason. Horton finished his rookie campaign with an 11-4 record, a 2.67 ERA, 97 strikeouts, and was runner up in NL Rookie of the Year voting, losing to Braves catcher Drake Baldwin.

On April 7, 2026, the Cubs announced that Horton would require season-ending surgery to repair a tear in his ulnar collateral ligament; the surgery was later revealed to have been a Tommy John procedure.

== Personal life ==
Cade is the middle of five children. On December 4, 2024, he married Blaire Davis in the Dominican Republic.
