= Topps All-Star Rookie Team =

Sports award

- Type: Baseball card
- Company: Topps
- Country: United States
- Availability: 1960–present
- Features: MLB rookie players

The Topps All-Star Rookie Team, also known as the Topps ASRT, is a list of notable Major League Baseball rookie players chosen annually by Topps Company, Inc. In most years since 1960, the company has issued a special set of baseball cards featuring the team's members.

== History ==
Since the 1960s, Topps' regular-issue baseball-card sets have included special cards featuring the players named to the annual Topps All-Star Rookie Team. The team usually consists of eight position players (four infielders, three outfielders, one catcher) and two pitchers (one left-hander and one right-hander).

The first Topps ASR team appeared in the 1960 baseball-card series. The special-design cards featured a trophy symbol of a batter on a top hat and the phrase, "Selected by the youth of America." The set included a card for Willie McCovey, a future member of the Baseball Hall of Fame.

In 1961, the ASR cards followed the regular-issue design but had a trophy symbol embossed with the phrase "Topps 1960 All-Star Rookie". This practice continued until 1973, when the symbol was changed to a gold cup bearing the words "Topps All-Star Rookie." Topps left the symbol off the 1974 cards, marking the first year since 1960 that the players were not recognized on the card faces. The gold cups reappeared in 1975 and stayed through 1978. In 1979, Topps once again left the symbol off the cards and it stayed off through the 1986 release. During the years when the symbol did not appear, a list of All-Star Rookies was still selected, though there was no regular indication of it on the cards.

The 1987 baseball set featured a throwback design paying homage to the 1962 set. The 1962 cards had a wood-grain design on the borders and had included the All-Star Rookie trophy on team members' cards. Topps brought back the gold cup symbol on the 1987 cards.

In 2000, a special 10-card insert set of Topps All-Star Rookies was included in packs of the regular issue. Topps combined a list of All-Star names and holographic foil design to celebrate the 40th anniversary of the Topps All-Star Rookie team. On the front, these cards featured a current player who had been named to a team in his respective rookie season. The backs of each card contained a list of players from 1959 through 1999 who had been named to the team at the position played by the player on the front of the card. The team was composed of the following:

- Mark McGwire, 1B
- Chuck Knoblauch, 2B
- Chipper Jones, 3B
- Cal Ripken Jr., SS
- Manny Ramírez, OF
- Ken Griffey Jr., OF
- José Canseco, OF
- Mike Piazza, C
- Dwight Gooden, RHP
- Billy Wagner, LHP

In 2014, Topps once again included a 10-card insert set of Topps All-Star Rookies in packs of their regular issue set. Featuring active (as of 2013) and retired players, the backs of the cards included a summary of each player's rookie season. The players featured included:

- Tom Seaver, RHP
- Willie McCovey. 1B
- Joe Morgan, 2B
- Albert Pujols, 3B
- Derek Jeter, SS
- Jim Rice, OF
- Mike Trout, OF
- Ken Griffey Jr., OF
- Johnny Bench, C
- CC Sabathia, LHP

== Players achievements ==
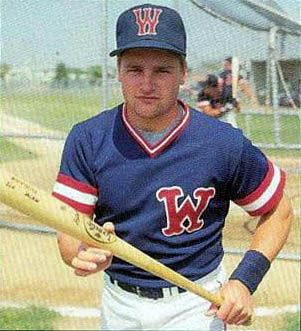
Chuck Knoblauch (here pictured in 1988), one of the players featured on a special 10-card insert set in 2000

Ichiro Suzuki, named to the 2001 Topps All-Star Rookie Roster, was also named the 2001 American League MVP. Suzuki, a Nippon League superstar, was also named the AL Rookie of the Year after winning the batting average and the stolen base crowns in his first Major League campaign. Ichiro's 242 base hits set the record for the most hits in a season by a rookie.

Nine different pitchers have been named to an All-Star Rookie Team and then won a league Cy Young Award, given annually to the best pitchers in Major League Baseball (MLB). Tom Seaver (1967) won three CY awards (1969, 1973, 1975) during his career. Fernando Valenzuela (1981) is the first player to be named to an All-Star Rookie team and win his league's Cy Young Award during the same season.

Over 41 different players have been named to an All-Star Rookie Team and then won a league MVP award. Shohei Ohtani earned four MVP awards (2021, 2023, 2024, 2025).

Fred Lynn (1975) and Ichiro Suzuki (2001) are the only players to be named onto the All-Star Rookie Team and win their league's MVP Award during the same season.

In 2025, Shohei Ohtani (2018) was named MVP for the National League. Aaron Judge (2017) was named MVP for the American League.

Many players named to a Topps All-Star Rookie team have also played in a Major League Baseball All-Star game. The most prolific All-Star was Cal Ripken Jr., who appeared on 19 All-Star rosters.

In 1995, 2001, and 2005, both Managers of the Year were former All-Star Rookie Team members. In '95 it was Don Baylor and Lou Piniella, in '01 it was Larry Bowa and Piniella, and in '05 it was Bobby Cox and Ozzie Guillén.

Thirty-seven players named to the Topps All-Star Rookie Team have been inducted into the National Baseball Hall of Fame:

- Willie McCovey, 1959
- Ron Santo, 1960
- Billy Williams, 1961
- Richie Allen, 1964
- Tony Oliva, 1964
- Joe Morgan, 1965
- Tony Pérez, 1965
- Rod Carew, 1967
- Tom Seaver, 1967
- Johnny Bench, 1968
- Carlton Fisk, 1972
- Gary Carter, 1975
- Jim Rice, 1975
- Andre Dawson, 1977
- Eddie Murray, 1977
- Paul Molitor, 1978
- Ozzie Smith, 1979
- Tim Raines, 1981
- Cal Ripken Jr., 1981-1982
- Ryne Sandberg, 1982
- Kirby Puckett, 1984
- Ken Griffey Jr., 1989
- Larry Walker, 1990
- Jeff Bagwell, 1991
- Iván Rodríguez, 1991
- Jeff Kent, 1992
- Mike Piazza, 1993
- Chipper Jones, 1995
- Derek Jeter, 1996
- Billy Wagner, 1996
- Andruw Jones, 1997
- Scott Rolen, 1997
- Todd Helton, 1998
- Carlos Beltrán, 1999
- CC Sabathia, 2001
- Ichiro Suzuki, 2001
- Joe Mauer, 2004

Two players who were named to the Topps All-Star Rookie Team have been inducted into the National Baseball Hall of Fame as managers, they are Joe Torre, 1961, and Bobby Cox, 1968 (both inducted 2014).

Two players were named onto the All-Star Rookie Team in their first two MLB seasons:

- Cal Ripken Jr. was named the All-Star Rookie shortstop his first two seasons. His cards appeared in the 1982 and 1983 sets –neither one included the gold trophy symbols.
- Ryan Mountcastle was an outfielder on 2020 All-Star Rookie Team and the first baseman on the 2021 All-Star Rookie Team.

== See also ==
- Baseball America All-Rookie Team
- Baseball awards § Other individual awards
