= Andújar Cedeño =

Dominican baseball player (1969–2000)

- Shortstop
- Born: August 21, 1969; La Romana, Dominican Republic
- Died: October 28, 2000 (aged 31); Santo Domingo, Dominican Republic
- Batted: Right Threw: Right

MLB debut
- September 2, 1990, for the Houston Astros

Last MLB appearance
- September 15, 1996, for the Houston Astros

MLB statistics
- Batting average: .236
- Home runs: 47
- Runs batted in: 223

CPBL statistics
- Batting average: .298
- Home runs: 3
- Runs batted in: 16
- Stats at Baseball Reference

Teams
- Houston Astros (1990–1994); San Diego Padres (1995–1996); Detroit Tigers (1996); Houston Astros (1996); Uni-President Lions (1998)

Andújar Cedeño Donastorg (August 21, 1969 – October 28, 2000) was a Dominican Major League Baseball (MLB) shortstop who played from 1990 to 1996. Born in La Romana, Dominican Republic, he played for the Houston Astros from 1990 to 1994, the San Diego Padres in 1995, and in 1996 played for the Padres, Detroit Tigers and Houston Astros again. His brother is former MLB player Domingo Cedeño. Four years after he last appeared in the major leagues, Cedeño was killed in a car accident in the Dominican Republic.

== Professional career ==
Cedeño was a highly regarded prospect in the Astros minor league system. Baseball America named him the 55th best prospect in the minor leagues in 1990, and the 2nd best overall prospect in 1991. He hit for the cycle in 1992, and was a career .236 hitter. His best season was in 1993 for the Astros, where he hit 11 home runs, 58 RBIs, and had a .283 batting average.

Cedeño played for twelve seasons in the Dominican League for Toros del Este, becoming team captain and finishing with 331 hits, 48 doubles, 9 triples and 19 home runs, 146 RBI, 123 runs scored, received 70 walks and stole 19 bases. He was renowned for his play in the championship from 1994 to 1995, when the team won its first national title. His number 10 is displayed on the wall of the center of Estadio Francisco Michelli in his honor. A stadium in La Romana was named after Cedeño, and includes a statue of him.

== Death ==
Cedeño died in an automobile accident on October 28, 2000, while heading to his home in La Romana, Dominican Republic, after a game between the Tigres de Licey and the Azucareros del Este in Santo Domingo. The Mercedes-Benz he was driving collided with a truck, killing him instantly. He was survived by three children.

== See also ==
- Houston Astros award winners and league leaders
- List of Major League Baseball players to hit for the cycle
- List of Major League Baseball players from the Dominican Republic

Achievements
Preceded by Ray Lankford	Hitting for the cycle August 25, 1992	Succeeded by Mark Grace
