= Águilas de Mexicali =

Mexican pro baseball team

Logo	Cap insignia

Information
- League: Mexican Pacific League
- Location: Mexicali, Baja California
- Ballpark: Estadio Farmacias Sta. Mónica
- Founded: 1976
- Caribbean Series championships: 1 (1986)
- League championships: 4 (1985–86, 1988–89, 1998–99, 2016–17)
- Colors: Red, navy blue and white
- Retired numbers: 3; 10; 14; 33; 34; 58
- Ownership: Grupo Águilas de Mexicali y Espectáculos S.A.P.I de C.V.
- President: Dío Alberto Murillo
- Manager: Óscar Robles
- Website: www.aguilasdemexicali.mx

The Águilas de Mexicali (English: Mexicali Eagles) are a professional baseball team based in Mexicali, Baja California, Mexico. They compete in the Mexican Pacific League (LMP). The team plays at the Estadio Nido de los Águilas also known simply as "El Nido" (The Nest) with a capacity of 20,000.

The Águilas have won the LMP championship four times, in 1985–86, 1988–89, 1998–99 and most recently in 2016–17. Led by Cananea Reyes, the Águilas also won the 1986 Caribbean Series, played in Maracaibo.

== History ==
Baseball has been played in Mexicali since 1914 and several teams have represented the city, the current incarnation of the Águilas was established in 1967 and made its debut in the Mexican Pacific League on 12 October 1976.

They have won the championship four times: in 1985–86 managed by Cananea Reyes, in 1988–89 coached by Dave Machemer, in 1998–99 under Francisco Estrada and most recently in 2016–17 managed by Roberto Vizcarra. The team also won the 1986 Caribbean Series, played in Maracaibo, Venezuela.

== Officers ==
- President: Dio Alberto Murillo Rogers
- Vice President: Rigoberto Cardenas Valdez
- Vice President of Operations: Jose Luiz Rodriguez Escoto
- Director, Scouting: David Cardenas Cortes

== Roster ==
Águilas de Mexicali roster
Active roster		Coaches
Pitchers: 66 (Mexico) Alonso Becerra; 54 (Mexico) Humberto Castellanos; 98 (Mexico) Yamil Castillo; 80 (Mexico) Daniel Cruz; 49 (Mexico) Jesús Cruz; 28 (Mexico) Norman Elenes; 64 (Mexico) Sergio García-Repper; 48 (Mexico) Ángel López; 36 (Mexico) Fernando Lozano; 70 (Mexico) Daniel Núñez; 31 (Mexico) Alain Peña; 40 (Mexico) David Reyes; 59 (Mexico) Juan Robles; 66 (United States) Zac Rosscup; 48 (Mexico) Jake Sanchez; 45 (Mexico) César Vargas; 82 (Mexico) Ernesto Zaragoza	Catchers: 5 (Mexico) Alejandro Flores; 42 (United States) Chuckie Robinson; 73 (Mexico) Gilberto Vizcarra; Infielders: 52 (Cuba) Yadir Drake; 61 (Mexico) Moisés Gutiérrez; 7 (Mexico) Marco Jaime; 11 (United States) Alex Mejia; 88 (Mexico) Esteban Quiroz; 25 (Mexico) Roberto Ramos; 2 (Mexico) Javier Salazar; Outfielders: 15 (Mexico) Ángel Camacho; 19 (Mexico) Oliver Carrillo; 29 (Mexico) Antonio Castañeda; 99 (United States) Clay Dungan; 29 (United States) Kai Murphy; 9 (Mexico) Norberto Obeso; 50 (Mexico) Luis Santos	Manager: 4 (Mexico) Roberto Vizcarra; Coaches: -- (Mexico) Adulfo Camacho (third base); 84 (Mexico) Miguel Duarte (pitching); -- (Mexico) Efrén Espinoza (first base); -- (Venezuela) Javier Godard (hitting); -- (United States) Bronswell Patrick (pitching); 38 (Mexico) Carlos Rodríguez (catchers); 16 (Mexico) Ramón Valdez (bench); 37 (Mexico) Francisco Villegas (bullpen); Roster updated on 15 October 2026

=== Retired numbers ===
The Águilas de Mexicali have retired the following numbers:

- 3: Mario Hernández
- 10: Cananea Reyes
- 14: Ernesto Escárrega
- 33: Isidro Márquez
- 34: Fernando Valenzuela
- 58: Vicente Palacios

== Season by season ==
Season	League	Division	Finish	Wins	Losses	Ties	Pct.	GB	Postseason
1976–77	LMP		6th	30	36	0	.455	10.5	Lost First round (Cañeros) 3–5
1977–78	LMP	North	3rd	32	35	1	.478	10.0	Lost First round (Naranjeros) 1–5
1978–79	LMP	North	4th	30	40	1	.429	13.0	4th in Round robin
1979–80	LMP	North	4th	31	40	3	.437	18.5	2nd in Round robin
1980–81	LMP		7th	41	44	0	.482	7.5	–
1981–82	LMP		3rd	49	41	2	.544	8.0	Lost Final (Naranjeros) 3–4

== Championships ==
Season	Manager	Opponent	Series score	Record
1985–86	Cananea Reyes	Tomateros de Culiacán	4–2	53–39
1988–89	Dave Machemer	Mayos de Navojoa	4–3	58–40–1
1998–99	Francisco Estrada	Tomateros de Culiacán	4–1	47–35
2016–17	Roberto Vizcarra	Cañeros de Los Mochis	4–2	49–38
Total championships			4	

== Caribbean Series record ==
Year	Venue	Finish	Wins	Losses	Win%	Manager
1986	(Venezuela) Maracaibo	1st	4	2	.667	(Mexico) Cananea Reyes
1989	(Mexico) Mazatlán	3rd	2	4	.333	(United States) Dave Machemer
1999	(Puerto Rico) San Juan	4th	2	4	.333	(Mexico) Francisco Estrada
2017	(Mexico) Culiacán	2nd	4	2	.667	(Mexico) Roberto Vizcarra
Total			12	12	.500	

== Notable players ==
- (United States) George Arias
- (United States) Jason Bourgeois
- (United States) Darryl Brinkley
- (Mexico) Matías Carrillo
- (Mexico) David Cortés
- (Mexico) Karim García
- (United States) Jonny Gomes
- (United States) Ben Guez
- (Mexico) Houston Jiménez
- (United States) Roy Johnson
- (United States) Matt Joyce
- (United States) John Kruk
- (Mexico) Ever Magallanes
- (Cuba) Ronnier Mustelier
- (United States) Mike Piazza
- (United States) Gene Richards
- (Mexico) Chris Roberson
- (United States) Sergio Romo
- (United States) Bubby Rossman
- (United States) Jeff Samardzija
- (Mexico) Jake Sanchez
- (United States) Charlie Sands
- (United States) Rudy Seánez
- (United States) Dan Serafini
- (Mexico) Fernando Valenzuela
- (Mexico) Sebastián Valle
- (Mexico) Héctor Velázquez
- (United States) Ron Washington
