= 1998–99 Mexican Pacific League season =

- League: Mexican Pacific League
- Sport: Baseball
- Duration: 14 October 1998 – 27 January 1999
- Games: 411
- Teams: 8
- Season champions: Águilas de Mexicali

LMP seasons
- ← 1997–98 1999–00 →

The 1998–99 Mexican Pacific League season was the 41st season in the history of the Mexican Pacific League (LMP). It was contested by eight teams. Águilas de Mexicali won their third championship by defeating Tomateros de Culiacán 4–1 in the final series, led by manager Francisco Estrada.

== Standings ==
Regular season standings
Rank	Team	W	L	T	Pct.	GB	Pts.
1	Yaquis de Obregón	38	29	1	.567	—	12.5
2	Naranjeros de Hermosillo	38	29	1	.567	—	12.5
3	Cañeros de Los Mochis	37	30	1	.552	1.0	11
4	Águilas de Mexicali	35	32	1	.522	3.0	11
5	Algodoneros de Guasave	35	32	1	.522	3.0	10.5
6	Tomateros de Culiacán	32	35	1	.478	6.0	10.5
7	Venados de Mazatlán	28	40	0	.412	10.5	7
8	Mayos de Navojoa	26	42	0	.382	12.5	7

== Postseason ==
First round
Los Mochis	2
Mexicali	4
Hermosillo	4
Guasave	2
Obregón	1
Culiacán	4

Semi-finals
Mexicali	4
Guasave	0
Hermosillo	3
Culiacán	4

Final
Mexicali	4
Culiacán	1

== League leaders ==
Batting leaders
Stat	Player	Team	Total
AVG	(United States) Matt Stark	Tomateros de Culiacán	.349
HR	(United States) Bubba Smith	Venados de Mazatlán	14
RBI	(Mexico) Erubiel Durazo	Naranjeros de Hermosillo	48
R	(United States) Eddie Williams	Naranjeros de Hermosillo	58
H	(United States) Jacque Jones	Yaquis de Obregón	86
SB	(United States) Darrell Sherman	Tomateros de Culiacán	26
SLG	(Mexico) Erubiel Durazo	Naranjeros de Hermosillo	.610

Pitching leaders
Stat	Player	Team	Total
ERA	(Mexico) José Manuel Hernández	Tomateros de Culiacán	2.00
W	(Mexico) Salvador Rodríguez	Yaquis de Obregón	8
L	(Mexico) Héctor Heredia	Mayos de Navojoa	9
SV	(Mexico) Gustavo Federico	Yaquis de Obregón	13
SV	(Mexico) Isidro Márquez	Águilas de Mexicali	13
IP	(Mexico) Daniel Garibay	Venados de Mazatlán	95.2
K	(Mexico) Daniel Garibay	Venados de Mazatlán	77

== Awards ==
1998–99 LMP Awards
Award	Player	Team
Manager of the Year	(Mexico) Aurelio Rodríguez	Algodoneros de Guasave
Most Valuable Player	(Mexico) George Arias	Águilas de Mexicali
Pitcher of the Year	(Mexico) José Manuel Hernández	Tomateros de Culiacán
Rookie of the Year	(Mexico) Marino Cota	Tomateros de Culiacán
