= Salvador Colorado =

Mexican baseball player

- Pitcher
- Born: 3 October 1951; Huatusco, Veracruz, Mexico
- Died: 27 April 2021 (aged 69); Jalapa, Veracruz, Mexico
- Batted: Right Threw: Right

Career highlights and awards
- Mexican Pacific League records: 0.53 ERA, single season

Member of the Mexican Professional

Baseball Hall of Fame
- Induction: 2009

Salvador Colorado Sánchez (3 October 1951 – 27 April 2021) was a Mexican professional baseball right-handed pitcher. Colorado spent all his career playing in Mexico in the Mexican League and the Mexican Pacific League. Colorado was inducted into the Mexican Professional Baseball Hall of Fame as part of the class of 2009.

== Career ==
Colorado was born on 3 October 1951 in Huatusco, Veracruz. He made his professional debut in the Mexican League in 1975 playing for the Charros de Jalisco, where he pitched two games, earning one win and one save. Despite his good performance, Colorado returned to amateur regional leagues in his home state of Veracruz and did not play professionally again until four years later.

In 1979, Colorado returned to the Mexican League, this time with the Azules de Coatzacoalcos, finishing with a 13–4 record and a 2.05 ERA. That same year, during the 1979–80 Mexican Pacific League season, Colorado won the Mexican Pacific League (LMP) Rookie of the Year award, while playing for the Potros de Tijuana.

Colorado finished the 1982–83 LMP season with 14 wins, leading the league, and recorded a 0.53 ERA, but lost the Triple Crown to Mercedes Esquer, who finished as the pitcher with more strikeouts. Colorado established a new LMP ERA single season record, that remains unbeaten as of 2023, and is considered as one of the thoughest records to beat in Mexican baseball.

In 1983, Colorado left the Azules and joined the Cafeteros de Córdoba. In 1985, he pitched a seven inning no-hitter against Sultanes de Monterrey in the Estadio Beisborama. In 1987, Colorado played for the Ganaderos de Tabasco and in 1988 for the Bravos de León. From 1989 to 1991, Colorado was part of the Leones de Yucatán. Colorado spent the 1992 season split between Jalisco and Córdoba. In 1993, he returned to Tabasco, now renamed as Olmecas, where he was part of the team that won the 1993 Mexican League championship. Colorado last played in 1994 for the Olmecas.

Colorado was known as a finesse pitcher, often throwing curveballs and changeups. When asked why he was not a power pitcher, Colorado replied: "if they (the batters) can't hit when I pitch slowly, go figure..."

In 2009, Colorado was elected to the Mexican Professional Baseball Hall of Fame.

== Death ==
Colorado died on 27 April 2021 in Jalapa, Veracruz, aged 69.

== Career statistics ==
=== Mexican Pacific League ===
Season	Team	W	L	Pct.	G	CG	IP	H	BB	SO	ERA
1979–80	Tijuana	5	3	.625	19	4	77.0	80	26	42	2.22
1980–81	Mexicali	0	0	.000	2	0	6.0	6	0	4	1.50
1981–82	Tijuana	5	5	.500	12	6	77.0	63	18	40	2.10
1982–83	Tijuana	11	3	.786	15	11	119.0	85	17	47	0.53
1983–84	Tijuana	11	6	.647	17	11	132.2	116	26	59	2.04
1984–85	Tijuana	5	9	.357	18	7	122.1	127	33	54	3.60
1985–86	Hermosillo	5	2	.714	7	7	56.0	47	6	23	1.29
1986–87	Hermosillo	5	2	.714	11	4	80.0	91	17	37	4.50
1987–88	Tijuana / Navojoa	6	5	.545	11	3	67.1	74	13	18	3.48
1988–89	Los Mochis	3	3	.500	9	3	69.0	67	9	27	3.52
1990–91	Los Mochis	2	5	.286	11	2	70.0	88	22	22	4.24
Total		58	43	.574	132	58	876.1	844	187	373	2.65
