= 2004 Caribbean Series =

2004 baseball tournament

The forty-sixth edition of the Caribbean Series (Serie del Caribe) was held from February 1 through February 6 of 2004 with the champion baseball teams of the Dominican Republic, Tigres del Licey; Mexico, Tomateros de Culiacán; Puerto Rico, Leones de Ponce, and Venezuela, Tigres de Aragua. The format consisted of 12 games, each team facing the other teams twice, and the games were played at Estadio Quisqueya in Santo Domingo, Dominican Republic.

== Final standings ==
Country	Club	W	L	W/L %	Managers
Dominican Republic	Tigres del Licey	5	1	.833	Manny Acta
Mexico	Tomateros de Culiacán	4	2	.667	Francisco Estrada
Venezuela	Tigres de Aragua	3	3	.500	Buddy Bailey
Puerto Rico	Leones de Ponce	0	6	.000	José Cruz

== Individual leaders ==
Player	Statistic
Batting
Carlos Rivera (PUR)	Batting average	.391
Raúl González (PUR); Luis López (PUR); Eduardo Ríos (VEN)	Home runs	2
Luis López (PUR); José Offerman (DOM); Luis Ordaz (VEN); Kit Pellow (MEX); Robert Pérez (VEN); Luis Rodríguez (VEN)	RBI	5
Pitching
Twelve players tied	Wins	1
José Jiménez (DOM)	ERA	0.00
Francis Beltrán (DOM)	Saves	3

== All-Star team ==
Name	Position
Adán Amezcua (MEX)	Catcher
Carlos Rivera (PUR)	First baseman
Luis Rodríguez (VEN)	Second baseman
Eduardo Ríos (VEN)	Third baseman
Benji Gil (MEX)	Shortstop
Izzy Alcántara (DOM)	Outfielder
Mendy López (DOM)	Outfielder
Robert Pérez (VEN)	Outfielder
David Ortiz (DOM)	Designated hitter
José Jiménez (DOM)	Right-handed pitcher
Dámaso Marte (DOM)	Left-handed pitcher
Francis Beltrán (DOM)	Relief pitcher
Awards
Francis Beltrán (DOM)	Most Valuable Player
Manny Acta (DOM)	Manager

== Sources ==
- Bjarkman, Peter. Diamonds around the Globe: The Encyclopedia of International Baseball. Greenwood. ISBN 978-0-313-32268-6
- 2004 Caribbean Series All-Star team
- Serie del Caribe : History, Records and Statistics (Spanish)
