= 2002 Caribbean Series =

2002 baseball tournament

The forty-fourth edition of the Caribbean Series (Serie del Caribe) was held from February 2 through February 8 of 2002 with the champion baseball teams of the Dominican Republic, Tigres del Licey; Mexico, Tomateros de Culiacán; Puerto Rico, Vaqueros de Bayamón, and Venezuela, Navegantes del Magallanes. The format consisted of 12 games, each team facing the other teams twice, and the games were played at Estadio Universitario in Caracas, the capital city of Venezuela.

== Final standings ==
Country	Club	W	L	W/L %	Managers
Mexico	Tomateros de Culiacán	5	1	.833	Francisco Estrada
Dominican Republic	Tigres del Licey	3	3	.500	Bob Geren
Puerto Rico	Vaqueros de Bayamón	2	4	.333	Carmelo Martínez
Venezuela	Navegantes del Magallanes	2	4	.333	Phil Regan

== Individual leaders ==
Player	Statistic
Batting
Ramón Hernández (VEN)	Batting average	.526
Kit Pellow (MEX)	Runs	7
Endy Chávez (VEN)	Hits	11
Adán Amezcua (MEX); Darrell Sherman (MEX); Miguel Tejada (DOM); Derrick White	Doubles	3
Carlos Baerga (PUR); Endy Chávez (VEN)	Triples	1
Vladimir Guerrero (DOM)	Home runs	4
Adán Amezcua (MEX)	RBI	9
Adán Amezcua (MEX); Carlos Hernández (VEN); César Izturis (VEN)	Stolen bases	2
Pitching
Twelve players tied	Wins	1
Geremi González (VEN)	Strikeouts	14
Wayne Franklin (VEN)	ERA	0.75
Geremi González (VEN)	Innings pitched	13 2/3
Todd Revening (MEX)	Saves	2

== All-Star team ==
Name	Position
Adán Amezcua (MEX)	Catcher
Alex Cabrera (VEN)	First baseman
Carlos Hernández (VEN)	Second baseman
José León (PUR)	Third baseman
Miguel Tejada (DOM)	Shortstop
Alex Diaz (PUR)	Left fielder
Endy Chávez (VEN)	Center fielder
Vladimir Guerrero (DOM)	Right fielder
Jacob Cruz (MEX)	Designated hitter
Odalis Pérez (DOM)	Left-handed pitcher
Rodrigo López (MEX)	Right-handed pitcher
Todd Revening (MEX)	Relief pitcher
Awards
Adán Amezcua (MEX)	Most Valuable Player
Francisco Estrada (MEX)	Manager

== Sources ==
- Bjarkman, Peter. Diamonds around the Globe: The Encyclopedia of International Baseball. Greenwood. ISBN 978-0-313-32268-6
- Serie del Caribe : History, Records and Statistics (Spanish)
