= Adan Amezcua =

Adan Amezcua may refer to:

- Adán Amezcua (born 1974), Mexican professional baseball player
- Adán Amezcua Contreras (born c. 1969), Mexican drug smuggler
