= Vaqueros de Bayamón (baseball) =

Professional baseball club in Bayamón, Puerto Rico

The Vaqueros de Bayamón was a professional baseball club which played from 1974 through 2003 in the Professional Baseball League of Puerto Rico. The Vaqueros joined the league as a replacement team for the departed Senadores de San Juan. They were based in Bayamón, Puerto Rico, and played their home games at Juan Ramón Loubriel Stadium.

The Vaqueros won league pennants in the 1974–75, 1975–76, 1979–80 and 2001–02 seasons, winning the championship in its inaugural season and the right to represent Puerto Rico in the 1975 Caribbean Series, which was held at the Hiram Bithorn Stadium in San Juan, Puerto Rico. The Bayamón club clinched the Series and was managed by José Pagán, winning five games in a row before losing to the Dominican Republic's Águilas Cibaeñas in the closing game, 5 to 4.

Leading the offensive charge in the Series was Ken Griffey, Sr., who won the batting title with a .500 average (12-for-24) and scored the most runs in the tournament (eight). Other contributions came from Félix Millán, who hit .435 (10-for-23) for the second best average, and Willie Montañez, who led all hitters with 11 runs batted in and tied for the most home runs (2), earning Most Valuable Player honors.

The Puerto Rican team also had a well-balanced lineup that included Orlando Álvarez, Sergio Ferrer, Art Howe, Jay Johnstone, Jerry Morales and Eliseo Rodríguez. On the other side, the pitching staff was headed by John Montague, who hurled a four-hit shutout, backed up by Tom Walker and Tom Hilgendorf, each winners in their respective starts. A solid bullpen was anchored by John Candelaria, Ed Figueroa, Jaime Navarro and Carlos Velázquez.

In the 2001–02 season Bayamón was the team nobody picked to win the Puerto Rican league crown. Nevertheless, the franchise that Carlos Baerga saved from bankruptcy two seasons prior headed to their first Caribbean Series since 1980. Since Baerga bought the ailing club it had failed to even make the playoffs. Then this time the underdog Vaqueros managed by Carmelo Martínez beat the highly favored Cangrejeros de Santurce of Mako Oliveras in the championship series, being guided by Baerga, who posted a .500 batting average with three RBI and seven runs scored, leading him subsequently to be named series MVP en route to the 2002 Caribbean Series.

But the Vaqueros failed from Day 1 at the Caribbean Series held in Caracas, Venezuela. Bayamón's import pitching, solid and sharp in the Puerto Rico playoffs, opted not to join the team for the trip. As a result, none of Bayamón's emergency starters in its first three games in Caracas made it past the fifth inning. It was not until Game 4 with the team 0–3 and all but mathematically eliminated from contention, that Puerto Rico won a game on a solid pitching effort. The team that Baerga built pulled out an 8–4 victory over their rivals Tigres del Licey of the Dominican Republic, with Omar Olivares allowing just four hits and two runs over seven innings of work. But was too late for Puerto Rico, whose role in the tournament would be as a spoiler for the other three teams, ending with a 2–4 record while tying for third place with the local Navegantes de Magallanes, behind Mexico's Tomateros de Culiacán (5–1) and the Dominican's Tigres del Licey (3–3).

Beside the aforementioned, the Vaqueros also featured players as Luis Aguayo, Benny Ayala, Carlos Beltrán, Dave Bergman, Tony Bernazard, Wade Boggs, Doug Corbett, Héctor Cruz, Dan Driessen, Darrell Evans, Tim Foli, Rubén Gómez, Tony Gwynn, Odell Jones, Frank LaCorte, Ricky Ledée, Doug Linton, Héctor Mercado, Kevin McReynolds, José Morales, John Rocker, Benito Santiago, Dave Smith, Dickie Thon and Denny Walling, among others in the history of the team.

The Vaqueros de Bayamón folded in 2003 after the league was unable to find a new owner.
