= 1988–89 Mexican Pacific League season =

- League: Mexican Pacific League
- Sport: Baseball
- Duration: 1 October 1988 – 30 January 1989
- Number of games: 411
- Number of teams: 8
- Season champions: Águilas de Mexicali

LMP seasons
- ← 1987–88 1989–90 →

The 1988–89 Mexican Pacific League season was the 31st season in the history of the Mexican Pacific League (LMP). It was contested by eight teams. Águilas de Mexicali won their second championship by defeating Mayos de Navojoa 4–3 in the final series, led by manager Dave Machemer.

== Standings ==
Regular season standings
Rank	Team	W	L	T	Pct.	GB	Pts.
1	Águilas de Mexicali	49	35	1	.583	—	16
2	Venados de Mazatlán	48	37	1	.565	1.5	11
3	Ostioneros de Guaymas	42	41	3	.506	6.5	10
4	Mayos de Navojoa	41	39	4	.513	6.0	10
5	Cañeros de Los Mochis	39	44	2	.470	9.5	8
6	Yaquis de Obregón	40	45	1	.471	9.5	7
7	Naranjeros de Hermosillo	38	44	2	.463	10.0	6
8	Tomateros de Culiacán	36	48	0	.429	13.0	4

== Postseason ==
First round
1	Mexicali	5
3	Guaymas	2
2	Mazatlán	1
4	Navojoa	5

Finals
1	Mexicali	4
4	Navojoa	3

== League leaders ==
Batting leaders
Stat	Player	Team	Total
AVG	(United States) Nelson Simmons	Venados de Mazatlán	.353
HR	(United States) Willie Aikens	Venados de Mazatlán	22
RBI	(United States) Willie Aikens	Venados de Mazatlán	73
R	(United States) Willie Aikens	Venados de Mazatlán	63
H	(United States) Greg Smith	Cañeros de Los Mochis	106
SB	(Mexico) Matías Carrillo	Ostioneros de Guaymas	37
SLG	(Mexico) Nelson Simmons	Venados de Mazatlán	.665

Pitching leaders
Stat	Player	Team	Total
ERA	(Mexico) Mercedes Esquer	Águilas de Mexicali	2.09
W	(Mexico) Mercedes Esquer	Águilas de Mexicali	13
L	(Mexico) Juan Manuel Palafox	Tomateros de Culiacán	10
SV	(Mexico) Héctor Heredia	Mayos de Navojoa	12
SV	(United States) Chris Jones	Yaquis de Obregón	12
IP	(Mexico) Mercedes Esquer	Águilas de Mexicali	151.0
K	(Mexico) Mercedes Esquer	Águilas de Mexicali	110

== Awards ==
1988–89 LMP Awards
Award	Player	Team
Manager of the Year	(United States) Dave Machemer	Águilas de Mexicali
Most Valuable Player	(Mexico) Mercedes Esquer	Águilas de Mexicali
Rookie of the Year	(Mexico) Juan Manuel García	Cañeros de Los Mochis
