= Fernando Valenzuela =

Mexican baseball player (1960–2024)

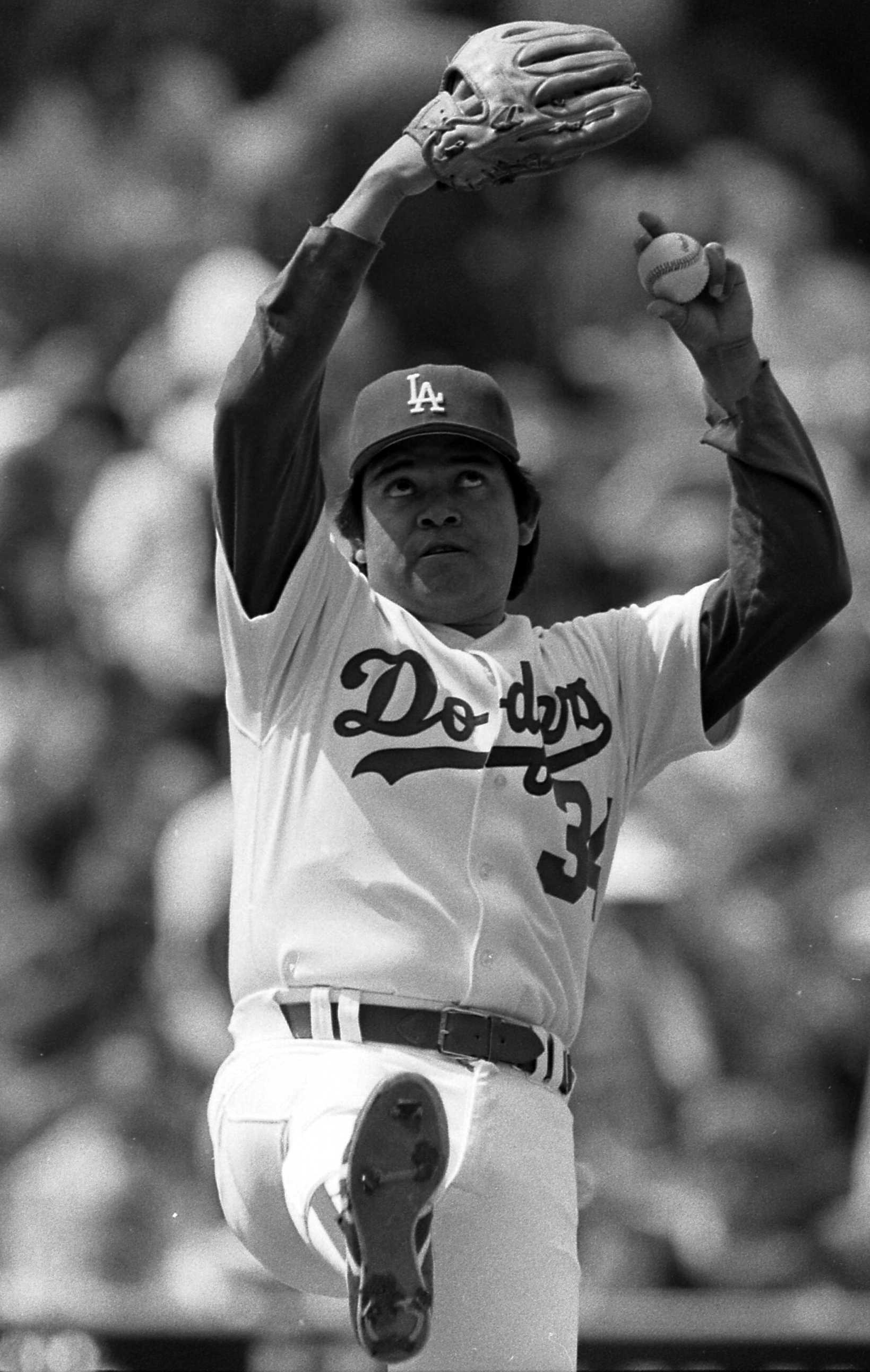
- Valenzuela with the Dodgers in 1986
- Pitcher
- Born: November 1, 1960; Etchohuaquila, Sonora, Mexico
- Died: October 22, 2024 (aged 63); Los Angeles, California, U.S.
- Batted: Left Threw: Left

MLB debut
- September 15, 1980, for the Los Angeles Dodgers

Last MLB appearance
- July 14, 1997, for the St. Louis Cardinals

MLB statistics
- Win–loss record: 173–153
- Earned run average: 3.54
- Strikeouts: 2,074
- Stats at Baseball Reference

Teams
- Los Angeles Dodgers (1980–1990); California Angels (1991); Baltimore Orioles (1993); Philadelphia Phillies (1994); San Diego Padres (1995–1997); St. Louis Cardinals (1997)

Career highlights and awards
- 6× All-Star (1981–1986); World Series champion (1981); NL Cy Young Award (1981); NL Rookie of the Year (1981); Gold Glove Award (1986); 2× Silver Slugger Award (1981, 1983); NL wins leader (1986); MLB strikeout leader (1981); Pitched a no-hitter on June 29, 1990; Los Angeles Dodgers No. 34 retired; Legend of Dodger Baseball

Member of the Mexican Professional

Baseball Hall of Fame
- Induction: 2014

Fernando Valenzuela Anguamea (Latin American Spanish pronunciation: [feɾˈnando βalenˈswela]; November 1, 1960 – October 22, 2024), nicknamed "El Toro", was a Mexican professional baseball pitcher. Valenzuela played 17 Major League Baseball (MLB) seasons, from 1980 to 1997 (except for a one-year sabbatical in Mexico in 1992). He played for six MLB teams, most prominently with the Los Angeles Dodgers, who signed him in 1979 and gave him his MLB debut in 1980. Valenzuela batted and threw left-handed, with an unorthodox windup. He was one of a small number of pitchers who regularly threw a screwball in the modern era.

Valenzuela enjoyed his breakout year in 1981, when "Fernandomania" rapidly catapulted him from relative obscurity to stardom. He won his first eight starts, five of them shutouts, and finished with a win–loss record of 13–7 and had a 2.48 earned run average (ERA) in a season that was shortened by a player's strike. He became the first, and as of 2026, only player to win both the Cy Young and Rookie of the Year awards in the same season. The Dodgers won the World Series that year.

Valenzuela peaked from 1981 to 1986, when he was named a National League (NL) All-Star in each season. He won an NL-leading 21 games in 1986, when he was a runner-up to Mike Scott of the Houston Astros for the Cy Young Award. Valenzuela was also one of the better hitting pitchers of his era. He had ten career home runs and was occasionally used by Los Angeles Dodgers manager Tommy Lasorda as a pinch-hitter. In 1986, he signed the then-largest contract for a pitcher in baseball history ($5.5 million/3 years). However, nagging shoulder problems diminished the remainder of his Dodgers career. He was on the Dodgers' 1988 World Series championship team, but sat out the postseason with a shoulder injury. Valenzuela threw a no-hitter in 1990 before the Dodgers released him prior to the 1991 season. He spent the rest of his major league career with the Los Angeles Angels, Baltimore Orioles, Philadelphia Phillies, San Diego Padres, and St. Louis Cardinals, before pitching a couple of seasons in Mexico in his 40s.

Valenzuela returned to the Dodgers organization after retiring, serving as a broadcaster from 2003 to 2024, the year of his death. The Dodgers retired his No. 34 in 2023. His career highlights include a record of 173–153, with an ERA of 3.54. His 41.5 career wins above replacement (according to Baseball Reference) is the highest of any Mexican-born MLB player.

== Early life ==
Valenzuela was born on November 1, 1960, in Etchohuaquila, a small town within the municipality of Navojoa, Sonora, Mexico. He was the youngest of 12 children. His parents, Avelino and María, were poor farmers who worked the land with the help of their children and were of Mayo indigenous ancestry. Although Valenzuela is not an indigenous surname, many Mayo and Yaqui indigenous families adopted it during the Porfiriato dictatorship to avoid forcible removal from their lands, similar to the case of Ritchie Valens (who was born Richard Valenzuela).

== Playing career ==
=== Early career in Mexico ===
In 1977, Valenzuela began his professional baseball career, signing with the Mayos de Navojoa of the Mexican Pacific League. A year later, he was sent to the Guanajuato Tuzos of the Mexican Central League, posting a 5–6 win–loss record with a 2.23 earned run average (ERA). The following year, the Mexican Central League was absorbed into the expanded Mexican League, automatically elevating then 18-year-old Valenzuela to the Triple-A level. Pitching for the Leones de Yucatán that year, Valenzuela went 10–12 with a 2.49 ERA and 141 strikeouts.

A number of Major League Baseball (MLB) teams scouted Valenzuela during this time. Los Angeles Dodgers owner Walter O'Malley, conscious of the large Latino population in Los Angeles, had wanted a Mexican ace pitcher for some time. Even so, the Dodgers found Valenzuela by accident. They sent scout Mike Brito to a game in Mexico to evaluate a shortstop named Ali Uscanga. Valenzuela threw three balls to Uscanga to fall behind in the count and then threw three straight strikes for the strikeout. Brito said later that at that point, he "forgot all about the shortstop". The Dodgers bought out Valenzuela's Liga contract on July 6, 1979, for $120,000 (about $521,158 in 2024), of which $20,000 went to Valenzuela and $100,000 went to the team. The New York Yankees subsequently offered $150,000, but the Leones honored their original deal, and Valenzuela became a Dodger.

=== Move to the Los Angeles Dodgers organization ===
After acquiring Valenzuela in the summer of 1979, the Dodgers assigned him to the Lodi Dodgers of the High-A California League, where he posted a 1–2 record and a 1.13 earned run average (ERA) in limited action. Brito worried that Valenzuela did not throw with enough velocity and felt that he needed to develop an off-speed pitch, so the Dodgers had their pitcher Bobby Castillo teach him to throw the screwball before the 1980 season. In 1980 Valenzuela was promoted to the Double-A San Antonio Dodgers, where he led the Texas League with 162 strikeouts and finished the season with a 13–9 win-loss record and a 3.10 ERA.

Valenzuela was called up to the major leagues in September 1980, serving as a reliever in the last month of the season. In his first game on September 15 against Atlanta, his catcher was Mike Scioscia, who spoke some Spanish; Valenzuela spoke little English. Valenzuela's excellent performances as a reliever (17 2/3 scoreless innings of relief in 10 games) helped the Dodgers tie the Houston Astros for the NL West division lead. He earned two wins and a save. However, the Dodgers then lost a one-game tiebreaker—and thus, the division championship—to the Astros.

=== "Fernandomania" ===
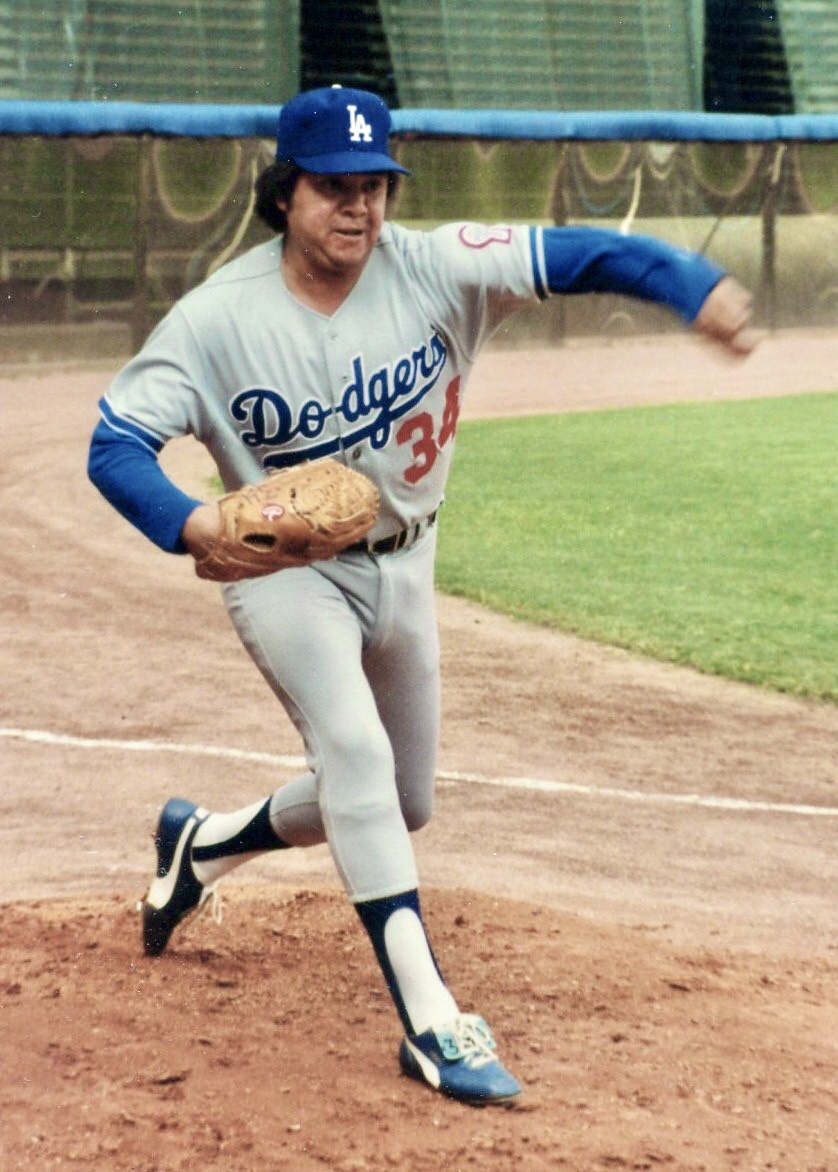
Valenzuela warming up for the Los Angeles Dodgers in 1981

Following his successful stint as a reliever in 1980, Valenzuela transitioned to a full-time starter role in his 1981 rookie season. He was unexpectedly named the Dodgers' Opening Day starter as a rookie after Jerry Reuss was injured 24 hours before his scheduled start, and Burt Hooton was not ready to fill in. At first, Valenzuela did not think manager Tommy Lasorda was serious. However, he filled in and shut out the Houston Astros 2–0. He was the first rookie to start Opening Day for the Dodgers.

Valenzuela enjoyed one of the hottest starts to a career in MLB history. He began the season 8–0 with seven complete games, five shutouts, and an ERA of 0.50. Valenzuela's unusual and flamboyant pitching motion, including a glance skyward at the apex of each wind-up, drew attention of its own. His most prominent and effective pitch was the screwball, which had not been a popular pitch for decades.

An instant media icon, Valenzuela drew large crowds from Los Angeles' Latino community every time he pitched, and his rookie 1981 Topps and Fleer baseball cards were in high demand. The craze surrounding Valenzuela came to be known as "Fernandomania". The Dodgers' Spanish radio broadcast ratings on KTNQ jumped from 3.4 to 8.6. His starts drew large crowds in every city. During his warm-up routine at Dodger Stadium, the PA system would play ABBA's 1976 hit song "Fernando". He became the first player to win the Rookie of the Year Award and the Cy Young Award in the same season, and finished fifth in NL MVP voting. He was also the first rookie to lead the NL in strikeouts. The Dodgers won the World Series that season.

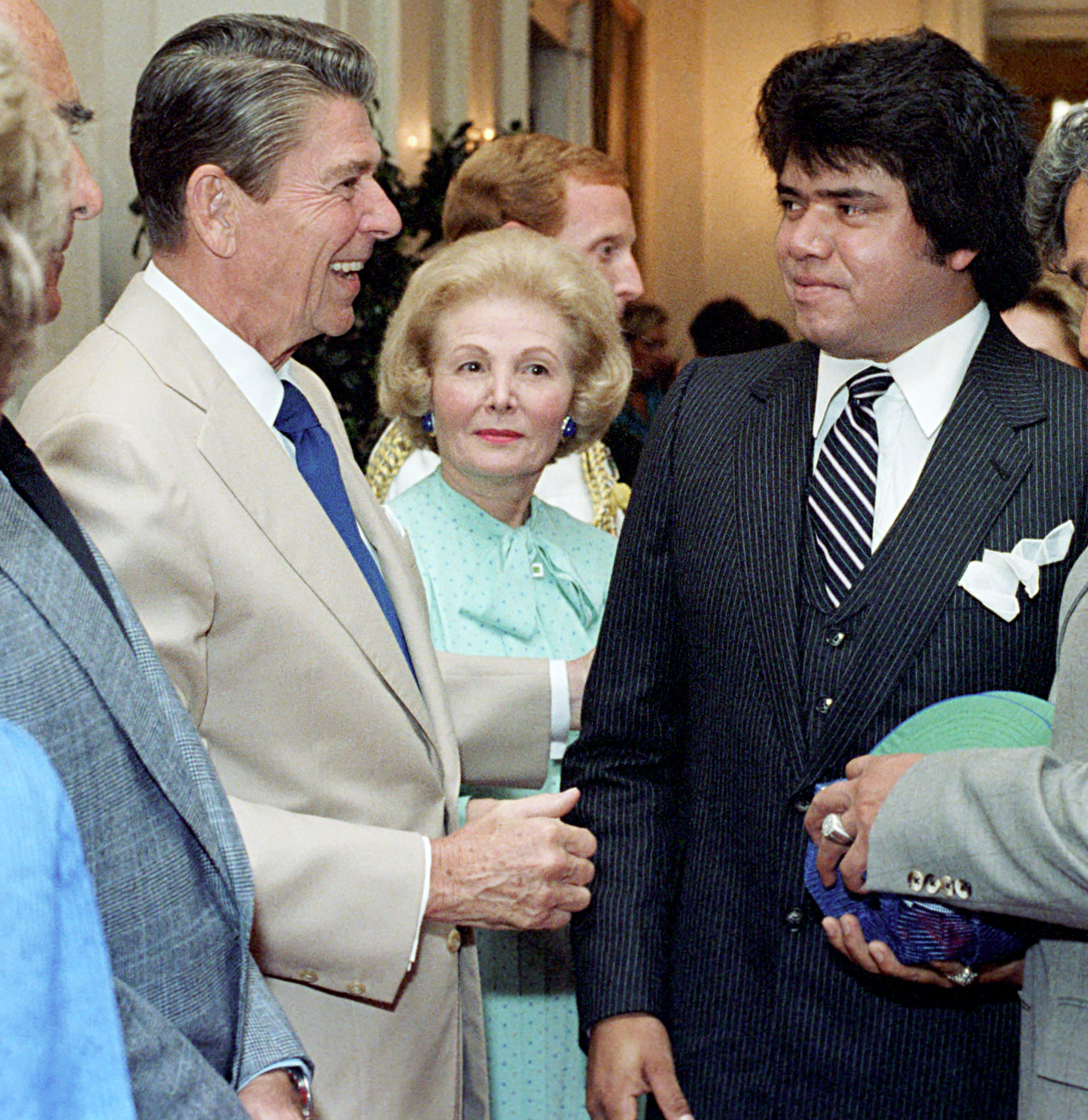
In 1981, President Ronald Reagan invited Valenzuela to the White House for a state luncheon with Mexican president José López Portillo.

Valenzuela was less dominant after the 1981 player strike wiped out the middle third of the season, but the left-hander still finished with a 13–7 record and a 2.48 ERA. He led the majors in shutouts (8) and strikeouts (180), and led the NL in complete games (11) and innings pitched (192.1). He was also second in the NL in wins (13). He demonstrated his unusually good batting (for a pitcher) by batting .250 and striking out just nine times in 64 at-bats. He became the first Dodgers pitcher to win the NL Silver Slugger Award.

In the NL West Division Series against the Houston Astros, Valenzuela became the youngest pitcher to start the first game of any postseason series. He also threw a 147-pitch (Note: Various outlets have reported differing pitch counts, although it is generally accepted that Valenzuela threw over 145 pitches. A display at Dodger Stadium records Valenzuela's pitch count at 147. However, a Spanish-language article on the Dodgers website says Valenzuela threw 146 pitches, and an English-language article on the same website says 147 pitches.) complete game in a game 3 win over the New York Yankees in the World Series. In total, he went 3–1 in the postseason with a 2.21 ERA in 40 2/3 innings, and he helped the Dodgers win their first World Series since 1965.

Valenzuela achieved this success knowing little English at the time. Scioscia gave some of the credit to Lasorda, who had learned Spanish during his time in the Caribbean winter leagues, and "gave him all instructions in Spanish." Scioscia also "learned Spanish just so he could communicate with Fernando", according to Lasorda. In 1981, the manager strictly platooned Scioscia and Steve Yeager at catcher, with Yeager seeing limited playing time with the Dodgers facing only 14 left-handers during the season. In game 3 of the World Series, Valenzuela was struggling when Lasorda substituted Scioscia, with whom the pitcher was more familiar, in place of Yeager, after Yankees left-hander Dave Righetti had exited the game. Lasorda credited Scioscia with steadying Valenzuela.

=== "El Toro" ===
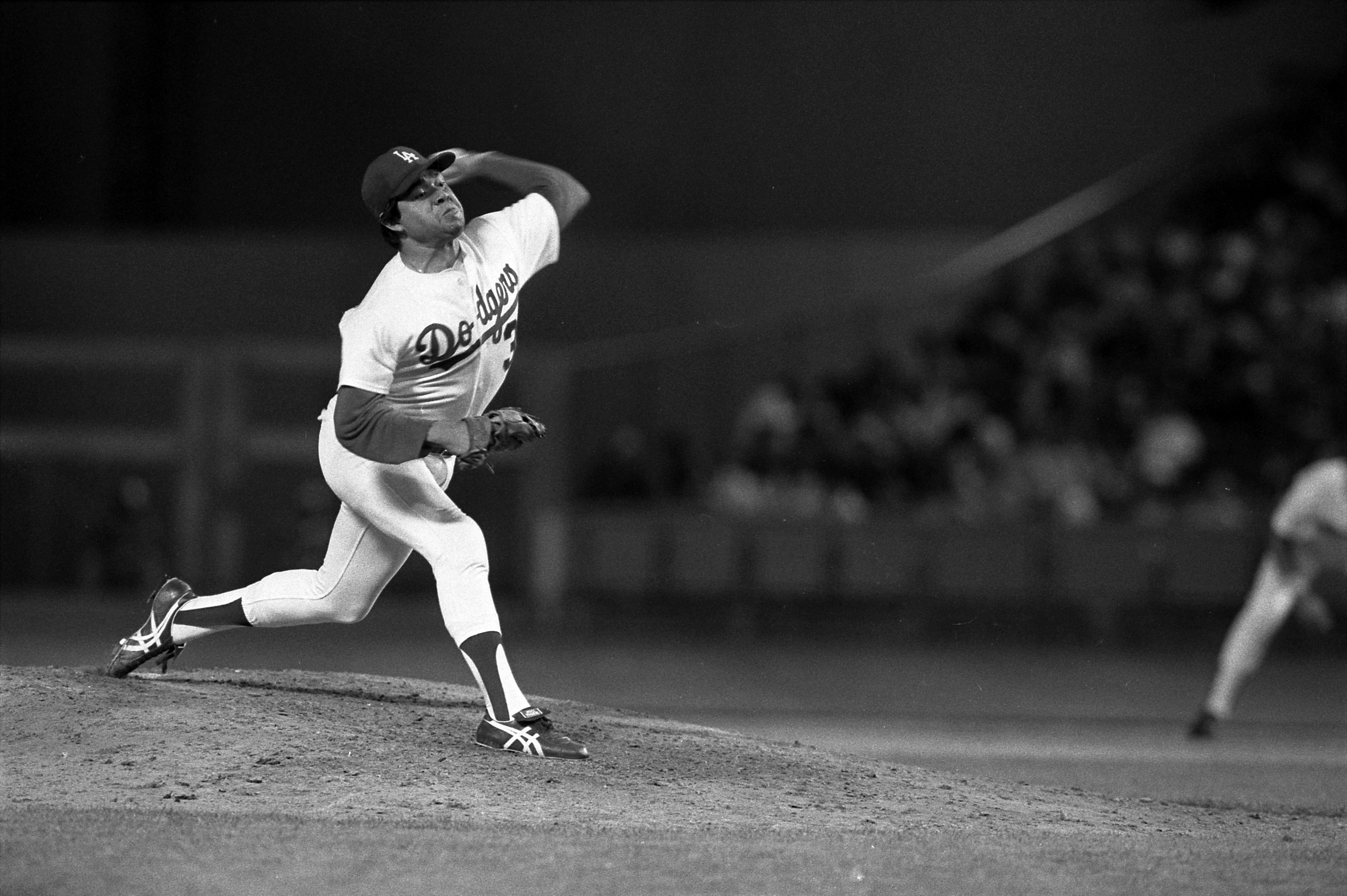
Valenzuela was named to six consecutive MLB All-Star Games.

Following his debut, Valenzuela, nicknamed El Toro (the Bull) by fans, settled down and established himself as a workhorse starter and one of the league's best pitchers. From 1981 to 1986, Valenzuela was named an All-Star six straight times and recorded an ERA of 3.14 or below in five of these years. He also recorded top-five Cy Young Award finishes in 1981, 1982, 1985, and 1986.

Valenzuela repeatedly commanded record-setting salaries. Prior to the 1983 season, Valenzuela became the first player to be awarded a $1,000,000 salary in arbitration (equivalent to $3.34 million in 2025), with his drawing power cited as part of the pitch. Before the 1986 season, he signed a contract worth $5.5 million over three years (equivalent to $16.15 million in 2025), then the wealthiest contract for a pitcher in baseball history. His annual average salary of $1,833,333 and 1988 salary of $2.05 million (equivalent to $5.58 million in 2025) also both set records for a pitcher.

In 1986, Valenzuela finished 21–11 with a 3.14 ERA and led the league in wins, complete games and innings pitched. He lost a narrow vote for the 1986 NL Cy Young Award to the Astros' Mike Scott. He also won the Gold Glove. In the 1986 All-Star Game, Valenzuela made history by striking out five consecutive American League batters, tying a record set by fellow left-handed screwballer Carl Hubbell in the 1934 contest.

Valenzuela's performance declined in 1987 with a 14–14 win–loss record and 3.98 ERA. In 1988, a year in which the Dodgers won the World Series, he was placed on the disabled list for the first time in his career due to left shoulder problems. He had pitched 255 games without missing a start. Valenzuela was out for two months, before making a cameo appearance with a three-inning start and a four-inning relief stint. He finished the season 5–8 with a 4.24 ERA, before being left off the playoff roster and getting needed rest. Although the Dodgers awarded him a second World Series ring, he refused to wear it, explaining that "I didn't do anything."

He improved slightly in 1989 and went 10–13. However, commentators noted "an obvious loss of velocity" following his 1988 shoulder injury. In the off-season, he signed a one-year, $2 million contract for 1990. In 1990, he posted a 13–13 record and his then-career worst 4.59 ERA. He had one last great moment on June 29, 1990, when he threw a 6–0 no-hitter against the St. Louis Cardinals just hours after the Oakland Athletics' Dave Stewart had thrown one against the Toronto Blue Jays. According to Lasorda, Valenzuela predicted to some of his teammates, "That's great, now maybe we'll see another no-hitter". (Scioscia recalled that Valenzuela's words were "You saw [a no-hitter] on TV, now you're going to see one in person.") It was the first time in the modern baseball era that two no-hitters were thrown on the same day.

=== Post-Dodgers career ===
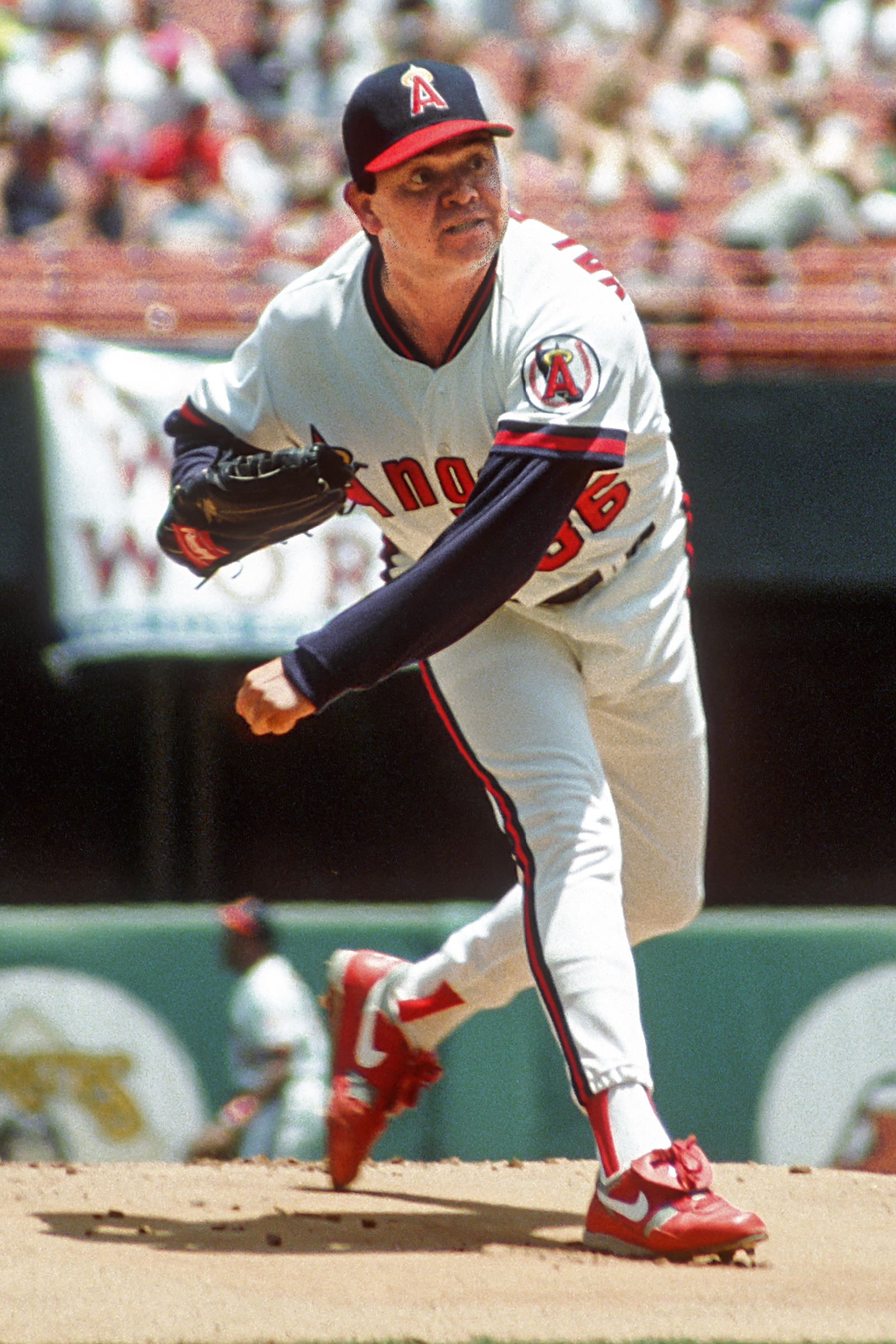
Valenzuela pitching for the California Angels in 1991

After struggling in spring training at 1–2 and a 7.88 ERA in 16 innings in 1991, Valenzuela was released by the Dodgers. At the time of his release, several Dodgers leaders, including Lasorda, Fred Claire, and Peter O'Malley, praised Valenzuela for creating exciting memories over several seasons and indicated that it was a difficult decision to release him. However, others described his cut as a cost-cutting move, as the Dodgers were facing a deadline to guarantee Valenzuela's $2.55 million contract.

With respect to the major leagues, 1991 and 1992 were essentially lost seasons for Valenzuela. Being cut late in 1991 spring training, when most rosters were already fixed, made it hard for Valenzuela to find a new team that year. He signed with the Los Angeles Angels later that summer, but played in only two games and posted a 12.15 ERA. He spent most of the season on the disabled list due to a heart problem. In 1992, he was out of the majors entirely and played for Charros de Jalisco of the Mexican League, going 10–9 with a 3.86 overall ERA, including an improved 2.70 in the second half. He completed 13 games in 22 starts.

Valenzuela returned to the majors in 1993 with the Baltimore Orioles. He was relatively healthy, making 31 starts, but gave up more walks than strikeouts for only the second time in his career (the other time being his injury-plagued 1988 season). His ERA was an unimpressive 4.94. He returned to the Mexican League for the start of 1994, but got another opportunity in the majors with the Philadelphia Phillies, who needed injury replacements for their starting rotation. He pitched well, starting 7 games and recording a 3.00 ERA until a players' strike wiped out the remainder of the season. When the Phillies announced that Valenzuela would start the July 4, 1994, Dodgers-Phillies game in Los Angeles, the Dodgers sold nearly 20,000 tickets within a week and recorded a sellout. Valenzuela gave up two runs in six innings; both runs were partially caused by a muffed fly ball "that was charitably scored a double." The Dodgers won 3–1.

Valenzuela moved back to Southern California to play for the San Diego Padres, with whom he enjoyed his last successful season in 1996, going 13–8 with a 3.62 ERA. Valenzuela started MLB's first-ever game in Mexico, helping the Padres beat the New York Mets at the Estadio Monterrey on August 16, 1996.

On June 13, 1997, the Padres traded Valenzuela, Scott Livingstone, and Phil Plantier to the St. Louis Cardinals for Rich Batchelor, Danny Jackson, and Mark Sweeney. He made five starts for the Cardinals, ending his MLB career with a record of 173–153 and a 3.54 ERA.

The Dodgers invited Valenzuela to spring training in 1999, but he declined the offer. In his mid-40s, he played a couple of seasons in the Mexican Pacific League for Águilas de Mexicali.

== Player profile ==
=== Pitching ===
Valenzuela relied on deception, command, and a large arsenal of off-speed pitches to keep opposing batters off balance. During his rookie year, Sandy Koufax noted that "it's very unusual for someone that young to have such control over so many pitches." He was never a power pitcher; at his peak he threw roughly 87–88 mph, which fell to 83–84 mph or below during his final Dodgers years and 79-84 mph in 1994. However, Valenzuela's longtime catcher Mike Scioscia recalled that at his peak, Valenzuela "had impeccable command" and could "move a ball 3 or 4 inches more off the corner at will." He praised Valenzuela's ability to disguise his pitches, noting that "everything looked like a fastball out of his hand."

He was best known for his screwball, which looked like a fastball and broke late. He was able to throw screwballs at varying velocities, and he could also cause them to break vertically or laterally. Rick Monday recalled that Valenzuela's screwball was so deceptive that it could generate swinging strikes even if Valenzuela was having trouble targeting it that day. However, he also threw an effective curveball, and was also known to throw a changeup, a sinker, and a slider. In his later years he added a cutter to mitigate his diminishing effectiveness.

A workhorse starter, Valenzuela was able to remain effective late in games, despite high pitch counts, which Scioscia credited to his slow heartbeat and ability to "slow the game down." In Game 3 of the 1981 World Series, with the Dodgers down 2–0 to the New York Yankees, Valenzuela struggled through difficult circumstances: he was pitching on short rest, he could not locate his signature screwball, and he surrendered nine hits and seven walks. He needed 72 pitches to get through the first three innings, and Valenzuela later recalled that Tommy Lasorda considered pulling him in the third inning. Nonetheless, he convinced Lasorda to leave him in the game. He shut down the Yankees offense for the next six innings to earn a complete game victory. He threw over 145 pitches that game, although the exact number is disputed.

Valenzuela was known for his unusual windup, which involved a skyward glance on every pitch, as well as his high leg kick. He said that he developed the former habit spontaneously during his time in the Dodgers' minor league system.

=== Hitting ===
Valenzuela was considered an atypically good hitter for a pitcher. He won the Silver Slugger award for pitchers in 1981 and 1983. Of his 41.5 career wins above replacement (WAR), 4.1 were attributed to his bat, including 1.2 WAR in 1990 (in just 78 plate appearances) and 0.6 WAR in both 1981 and 1986 (71 and 116 plate appearances, respectively). By way of comparison, Mike Hampton (the all-time leader in pitching Silver Sluggers) never tallied more than 1.2 batting WAR in a single season.

Valenzuela's best year at the plate was 1990—his last year with the Dodgers—when he had a .304 batting average with five doubles, a home run, and 11 runs batted in (RBIs) in 69 at-bats. That gave him a 101 OPS+, meaning Valenzuela ranked just above average among all NL hitters that year, including non-pitchers. He batted .200 for his career (187 hits in 936 at-bats, roughly equivalent to two seasons as a position player) with 10 home runs, 26 doubles, and 84 RBIs. Valenzuela was even used on occasion as a pinch-hitter, batting .368 (7-for-19) as such. Twice while with the Dodgers, Valenzuela was called upon to play the outfield and first base in marathon extra-inning games in which he did not pitch.

== Retirement ==
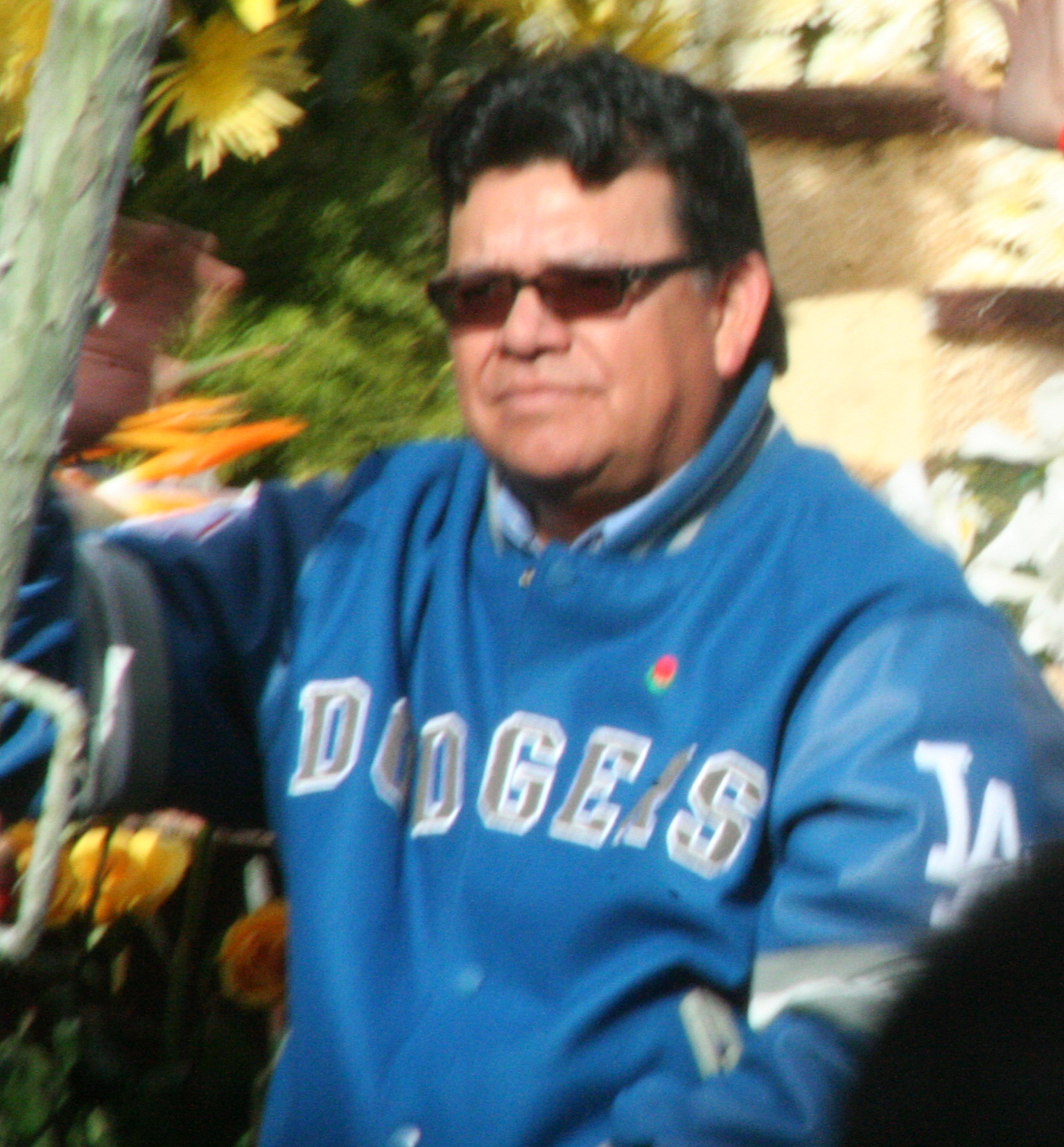
Valenzuela in 2007

Valenzuela was angry at the Dodgers over his 1991 release for beyond a decade. Although he lived close to Dodger Stadium, he boycotted games and team-sponsored activities. In 2003, Valenzuela returned to the Dodgers organization as the Spanish-language radio color commentator for NL West games, joining Jaime Jarrín and Pepe Yñiguez in the Spanish-language booth. In 2015, he made the jump to television, becoming the Spanish-language color commentator for the Dodgers' cable affiliate SportsNet LA. He stepped down from broadcasting in the last week of the 2024 regular season.

Valenzuela served on Team Mexico's World Baseball Classic coaching staff in 2006, 2009, 2013, and 2017.

Valenzuela purchased the Mexican League team Tigres de Quintana Roo in 2017.

== Legacy ==
=== Statistical profile and league-wide honors ===
Valenzuela's 41.45 career wins above replacement is the highest for a Mexican player in MLB history. He was inducted into the Hispanic Heritage Baseball Museum Hall of Fame on August 23, 2003, in a pregame ceremony at Dodger Stadium. In 2005, he was named one of three starting pitchers on MLB's Latino Legends Team. In 2013, he was enshrined into the Caribbean Baseball Hall of Fame. Valenzuela was inducted into the Baseball Reliquary's Shrine of the Eternals in 2006.

On July 6, 2019, the Mexican League retired Valenzuela's jersey number 34 from the entire league.

In the 2003 Baseball Hall of Fame balloting, Valenzuela's first year of eligibility, he received 6.3% of the vote. He dropped off the ballot the following year. As of 2025, he has never been considered for induction by the Veterans Committee.

Commentators have occasionally questioned whether Valenzuela's sharp mid-career decline was due to overuse (Valenzuela led the league in batters faced three times in his first seven seasons) and whether he could have accumulated the counting stats necessary for the Hall of Fame if modern best practices had been in place during the 1980s. Although some commentators suggested that Valenzuela's reliance on the screwball caused permanent damage to his shoulder, Dodgers orthopedist Frank Jobe firmly attributed his decline to overuse, explaining that "Fernando pitched a horrendous number of innings" during his years with the team.

=== Impact on the Dodgers ===
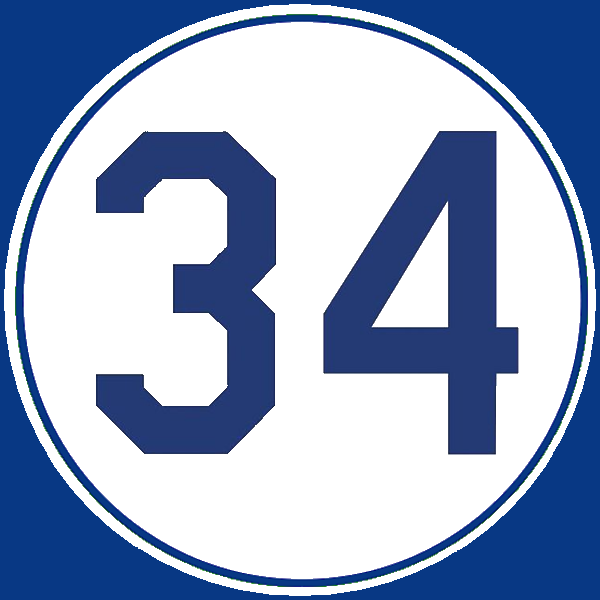
Fernando Valenzuela's number 34 was retired by the Los Angeles Dodgers in 2023.

Valenzuela was an iconic figure for the Mexican-American community in Los Angeles and his impact "transform[ed] what had been predominantly a white [Dodger] fan base." The Dodgers had previously courted controversy among Los Angeles' Latino community due to the location of Dodger Stadium. Starting in 1951, the city of Los Angeles had struggled to evict a predominantly Latino, working-class community in the Chavez Ravine neighborhood (see Battle of Chavez Ravine). The city promised the nearly 1,800 displaced families, which also included Italian-Americans and Chinese-Americans, that it would allow the families to return after building a public housing project on the site. However, Norris Poulson was elected mayor in 1953 on a platform opposing public housing, and the housing plan was canceled.

When the Brooklyn Dodgers announced that they were looking for a new city, Poulson sold the Chavez Ravine site to the team at a below-market price, allowing the Dodgers to build Dodger Stadium. Although the Dodgers were not directly responsible for evicting the residents of Chavez Ravine, they were the greatest beneficiary of the eviction and thereby became a target of resentment for many Latinos in the area.

Valenzuela's rise is credited with helping heal the divide between Latinos and the Dodger franchise. Jaime Jarrín, the Dodgers' longtime Spanish-language broadcaster, estimated that before Fernandomania, no more than 10% of fans at Dodger home games were Latino, a figure that rose to 54% by 2015. In addition to Mexican-Americans, teammate Dusty Baker noted that other Latin Americans rallied behind Valenzuela. Although the Dodgers consistently led the majors in attendance before Valenzuela's debut, his performances drew even larger crowds. In 1981, the Dodgers' average attendance was 42,523, which rose to 48,430 when Valenzuela started at home. Vin Scully later said that "Fernandomania bordered on a religious experience."

The Dodgers retired Valenzuela's jersey number 34 on August 11, 2023, celebrating the event with a "Fernandomania" weekend on August 11–13. Along with Jim Gilliam, Valenzuela is one of only two Dodgers to receive this honor despite not being in the Baseball Hall of Fame. Although Valenzuela's number was not officially retired for several decades after Valenzuela left the Dodgers, the team had consistently (though unofficially) kept the number out of circulation out of respect for Valenzuela.

The Dodgers also invited Valenzuela to throw the ceremonial first pitch at Game 2 of the 2017 World Series at Dodger Stadium, where he was introduced by retired announcer Vin Scully and joined by Steve Yeager. The team also honored him by naming him to the inaugural Legends of Dodger Baseball class in 2019.

On October 26, 2010, ESPN broadcast a documentary commemorating Valenzuela's arrival with the Dodgers titled Fernando Nation as part of their 30 for 30 documentary series.

== Personal life ==
In 1981, Valenzuela married Linda Burgos, a schoolteacher from Mexico. Early in his career, Valenzuela and his family spent offseasons between the Mexican cities of Etchohuaquila and Mérida. The couple had four children, Fernando Jr., Ricardo, Linda, and Maria Fernanda. Fernando Jr. played in the San Diego Padres and Chicago White Sox organizations as a first baseman before playing in independent league baseball and Mexican minor league baseball.

Valenzuela became a U.S. citizen on July 22, 2015 at a ceremony in downtown Los Angeles. Following his naturalization, President Barack Obama appointed him a special ambassador for citizenship and naturalization, "promoting the rights, responsibilities and opportunities of citizenship among eligible lawful permanent residents."

Valenzuela participated in two Tournament of Roses Parades: in 1983 aboard the float from the Government of Mexico and in 2008 aboard the Los Angeles Dodgers' float. In 1981, Valenzuela participated in the East Los Angeles Christmas Parade as Grand Marshal.

== Illness and death ==
On October 1, 2024, it was announced that Valenzuela had been hospitalized for an undisclosed illness. The Dodgers announced the following day that he would "not be in the broadcast booth for the remainder of this year to focus on his health."

=== Death and funeral ===
Valenzuela died in a Los Angeles hospital on October 22, 2024, at the age of 63. His funeral took place on November 6, 2024, at the Cathedral of Our Lady of the Angels, where he was eulogized by his son Fernando Jr. and Mike Scioscia. He was cremated, and his ashes were interred at Forest Lawn Memorial Park.

Shortly after his death, Valenzuela's illness was reported to have been liver cancer. However, his official death certificate concluded that he died of septic shock attributed to a combination of nonalcoholic and alcoholic cirrhosis that resulted in liver failure. The certificate added that Valenzuela also might have been suffering from Creutzfeldt–Jakob disease.

=== Memorials ===
Before Game 1 of the 2024 World Series, fans left flowers and memorabilia at the Dodger Stadium sign outside the stadium. In Game 1, the Dodgers commemorated Valenzuela's life and career with a ceremony featuring Valenzuela's wife and children and a moment of silence. Valenzuela's teammates Orel Hershiser and Steve Yeager were supposed to throw out the opening pitch, but did not do so out of respect for Valenzuela. Instead, Hershiser placed a baseball on the pitcher's mound, which was painted with Valenzuela's No. 34. Hershiser and Yeager also wore Valenzuela's jersey for the ceremony. Flags flew at half-staff and a mariachi band performed at the game.

The Dodgers further announced that they would wear a uniform patch honoring Valenzuela during the 2024 World Series and 2025 season. Coincidentally, the Dodgers' World Series celebrations took place on November 1, 2024, on what would have been Valenzuela's 64th birthday. A number of people attending the victory parade and Dodger Stadium celebration held signs commemorating his birthday, and fans sang "Happy Birthday" all along the parade route.

Artist Robert Vargas completed a large mural of Valenzuela in Boyle Heights shortly after Valenzuela's death.

== See also ==
- List of Major League Baseball annual shutout leaders
- List of Major League Baseball annual strikeout leaders
- List of Major League Baseball annual wins leaders
- List of Major League Baseball career bases on balls allowed leaders
- List of Major League Baseball career strikeout leaders
- List of Major League Baseball career wild pitches leaders
- List of Major League Baseball no-hitters
- List of Major League Baseball players from Mexico

Awards and achievements
Preceded by Burt Hooton; Jerry Reuss; Orel Hershiser	Los Angeles Dodgers Opening Day; Starting pitcher 1981; 1983–86; 1988	Succeeded by Jerry Reuss; Orel Hershiser; Tim Belcher
Preceded by Dave Stewart	No-hitter pitcher June 29, 1990	Succeeded by Terry Mulholland
