= Adán Amezcua =

Mexican baseball player (born 1974)

- Catcher / Coach
- Born: March 9, 1974 (age 52); Mazatlán, Sinaloa, Mexico
- Bats: Right Throws: Right

Career highlights and awards
- Caribbean Series Most Valuable Player (2002); Caribbean Series All-Star team (2002; 2004)

Member of the Caribbean

Baseball Hall of Fame
- Induction: 2021

Adán Amezcua Magallón [ah-mess'-coo-ah] (born March 9, 1974) is a Mexican former professional baseball catcher and coach. Listed at 6 ft 3 in (1.91 m), 198 pounds (90 kg), he batted and threw right handed.

== Playing career ==
Through the years, Amezcua has established himself as one of the most distinguished catchers in Mexican baseball history. Though he never has played in a Major League game, Amezcua has spent more than two decades in the minor leagues while playing in part or all of 21 seasons spanning 1993–2013.

A native of Mazatlán, Sinaloa, he was born as Adán Amezcua Magallón to parents of Basque origin. He was signed as a 19-year-old by the Houston Astros organization in 1993, playing for them eight years before joining the Baltimore Orioles (2000–2001) and San Diego Padres (2002) systems, reaching Triple-A level with the Rochester Red Wings in the International League and the Portland Beavers of the Pacific Coast League.

Amezcua has also played from 1997 in the Mexican League, most prominently for the Sultanes de Monterrey, winning a title with the team in the 2007 season. In addition, he helped the Tomateros de Culiacán win the 2001–2002 Mexican Pacific League championship. As the league champions, the team represented Mexico in the 2002 Caribbean Series. And Amezcua excelled in the tournament, guiding Culiacán to the Series title after hitting .455 with three home runs and nine RBI, to claim MVP honors and an All-Star team selection.

He returned to the Series in its 2004 edition with Culiacán and was named to the All-Star team for a second time. In 2005, with the Tomateros eliminated in the playoffs, Amezcua reinforced the Venados de Mazatlán in the 2005 Caribbean Series. His contribution was creditable without being notable, as the Mexican representative team captured the title. At the end he received a high praise for his work with the pitching staff, which included Francisco Campos (2–0, 23 strikeouts, 1.13 ERA), Jorge Campillo (1–0, 0.00 ERA) and Pablo Ortega (1–0, 1.13 ERA).

Having caught more than 1200 games in his career, Amezcua has collected a .984 fielding average and nailed 35 percent of potential base-stealers (319 of 582). He has a slash line (BA/OBP/SLG) of .284/.360/.424 in 1264 games.

At 39, Amezcua joined the Tigres de Quintana Roo in the 2013 Mexican League season. He posted a .294/.402/.511 line in 81 games, including 10 homers and 81 RBI. After that, he completed a streak of 21 straight seasons with the Tomateros de Culiacán, a record for most consecutive seasons played for the same club in Mexican baseball history.

== Coaching career ==
Amezcua spent the 2025 season as the catching coach for the Leones de Yucatán of the Mexican League. On September 25, 2025, Amezcua was fired by the Leones.
