= 1985–86 Mexican Pacific League season =

- League: Mexican Pacific League
- Sport: Baseball
- Duration: 5 October 1985 – 28 January 1986
- Number of games: 411
- Number of teams: 10
- Season champions: Águilas de Mexicali

LMP seasons
- ← 1984–85 1986–87 →

The 1985–86 Mexican Pacific League season was the 28th season in the history of the Mexican Pacific League (LMP). It was contested by ten teams. Águilas de Mexicali won their first championship by defeating Tomateros de Culiacán 4–2 in the final series, led by manager Cananea Reyes.

== Standings ==
North
Rank	Team	W	L	T	Pct.	GB	Pts.
1	Ostioneros de Guaymas	45	27	2	.625	—	10
2	Águilas de Mexicali	39	32	3	.549	5.5	8
3	Potros de Tijuana	37	34	1	.521	7.5	6
4	Naranjeros de Hermosillo	33	40	1	.452	12.5	3
5	Yaquis de Obregón	31	42	1	.425	14.5	3

South
Rank	Team	W	L	T	Pct.	GB	Pts.
1	Cañeros de Los Mochis	38	32	2	.543	—	7
2	Algodoneros de Guasave	36	34	3	.514	2.0	7
3	Venados de Mazatlán	37	35	2	.514	2.0	7
4	Tomateros de Culiacán	34	34	3	.500	3.0	7
5	Mayos de Navojoa	27	47	0	.365	13.0	2

== Postseason ==
First round
N2	Mexicali	5
N4	Hermosillo	2
N1	Guaymas	1
N3	Tijuana	5
S1	Los Mochis	5
S3	Mazatlán	2
S2	Guasave	2
S4	Culiacán	5

Semifinals
N2	Mexicali	5
N3	Tijuana	3
S1	Los Mochis	2
S4	Culiacán	5

Finals
N2	Mexicali	4
S4	Culiacán	2

== League leaders ==
Batting leaders
Stat	Player	Team	Total
AVG	(United States) Eddie Bronson	Yaquis de Obregón	.335
HR	(Mexico) Carlos Soto	Algodoneros de Guasave	17
RBI	(United States) Gary Gray	Ostioneros de Guaymas	61
R	(United States) Eddie Miller	Venados de Mazatlán	50
R	(United States) Eddie Bronson	Yaquis de Obregón	50
H	(Mexico) Alonso Téllez	Ostioneros de Guaymas	94
SB	(United States) Eddie Miller	Venados de Mazatlán	30
SLG	(Mexico) Carlos Soto	Algodoneros de Guasave	.562

Pitching leaders
Stat	Player	Team	Total
ERA	(Mexico) Félix Tejeda	Ostioneros de Guaymas	1.25
W	(Mexico) Jaime Orozco	Potros de Tijuana	13
W	(Mexico) Guillermo Valenzuela	Cañeros de Los Mochis	13
L	(Mexico) Rodolfo Valdez	Mayos de Navojoa	10
SV	(Mexico) Jesús Vila	Potros de Tijuana	13
IP	(Mexico) Jaime Orozco	Potros de Tijuana	143.1
K	(Mexico) Jaime Orozco	Potros de Tijuana	125

== Awards ==
1985–86 LMP Awards
Award	Player	Team
Manager of the Year	(Mexico) Cananea Reyes	Águilas de Mexicali
Most Valuable Player	(United States) Jim Leopold	Águilas de Mexicali
Rookie of the Year	(Mexico) Luis Alberto Peña	Mayos de Navojoa
Rookie of the Year	(Mexico) Martín Hernández	Venados de Mazatlán
