= Bobby Magallanes =

American baseball coach (born 1969)

- Coach
- Born: August 18, 1969 (age 57); Los Angeles, California, U.S.

Teams
- Atlanta Braves (2021–2024); Seattle Mariners (2025–2026)

Career highlights and awards
- World Series champion (2021)

Robert Magallanes (born August 18, 1969) is an American professional baseball coach who previously coached for the Atlanta Braves and the Seattle Mariners of Major League Baseball (MLB).

== Career ==
Magallanes attended Bell High School in Bell, California, and graduated in 1987. The Montreal Expos selected him in the 44th round of the 1987 MLB draft, but he did not sign and enrolled at Cerritos College. The Seattle Mariners selected Magallanes in the 50th round of the 1989 MLB draft. He played in Seattle's minor league system through 1992. After two years out of baseball, he was a replacement player in spring training in 1995 for the Chicago Cubs during the ongoing strike. That year, he played in the independent Texas-Louisiana League. He briefly returned to affiliated baseball in 1996, playing 12 games for the Jackson Generals. He played in the Mexican Baseball League for the Diablos Rojos del México, Broncos de Reynosa, Pericos de Puebla and Tigres de Quintana Roo between 1996 and 2001.

Magallanes became a coach in the Los Angeles Angels' organization in 2002. He became the manager of the Cedar Rapids Kernals for the 2004 season. He was promoted to manage the Arkansas Travelers in 2007, and won the Texas League championship in 2008. He managed Arkansas through 2010 and then managed the Birmingham Barons in 2011 and 2012. He coached for Estrellas Orientales in the Dominican Winter League in 2013–14. He was hitting coach for the Lynchburg Hillcats in 2015 and the Arizona League Indians in 2016 and 2017. In 2018, he coached the Columbus Clippers. He coached the Gwinnett Stripers in 2019, and was brought up to the major leagues with the Atlanta Braves during September.

In 2021, the Braves promoted Magallanes to the major league coaching staff as assistant hitting coach. Magallanes was a member of the 2021 World Series champions. On October 10, 2024, the Braves announced that Magallanes would not return for the 2025 season. On November 25, 2024, Magallanes was hired by the Seattle Mariners in the same role for 2025. He was relieved of duties July 23, 2026.

Magallanes was a hitting coach for Mexico in the 2023 and 2026 World Baseball Classic.

== Personal life ==
Magallanes's older brother, Ever Magallanes, is also a baseball manager and former player, who reached the majors in 1991. Magallanes replaced his older brother as manager of the Birmingham Barons in 2010. Both brothers were replacement players on the 1995 Chicago Cubs and later coached Mexico in the 2023 World Baseball Classic. Born in the United States, Magallanes is of Mexican descent.

Magallanes is married and has three children.

Magallanes is studying for a master's degree in performance psychology at National University.
