= Mike Brito =

Cuban-American baseball scout (1934–2022)

Mike Brito (August 21, 1934 – July 7, 2022) was a Cuban-American baseball scout. He was a scout for the Los Angeles Dodgers for nearly 45 years. His biggest signing was pitcher Fernando Valenzuela along with others in the notably great Dodger farm system. Brito was easily recognizable on Dodger home and away game telecasts by standing behind home plate, wearing a white Panama hat and holding a radar gun. Before they showed the pitch speed on the stadium scoreboard. Mike and Vin Scully had a code where Mike would occasionally turn around and throw up fingers to let Vin know the speed of the pitch to let listeners know on the TV and radio side.
