= Etchohuaquila =

Settlement in Sonora, Mexico

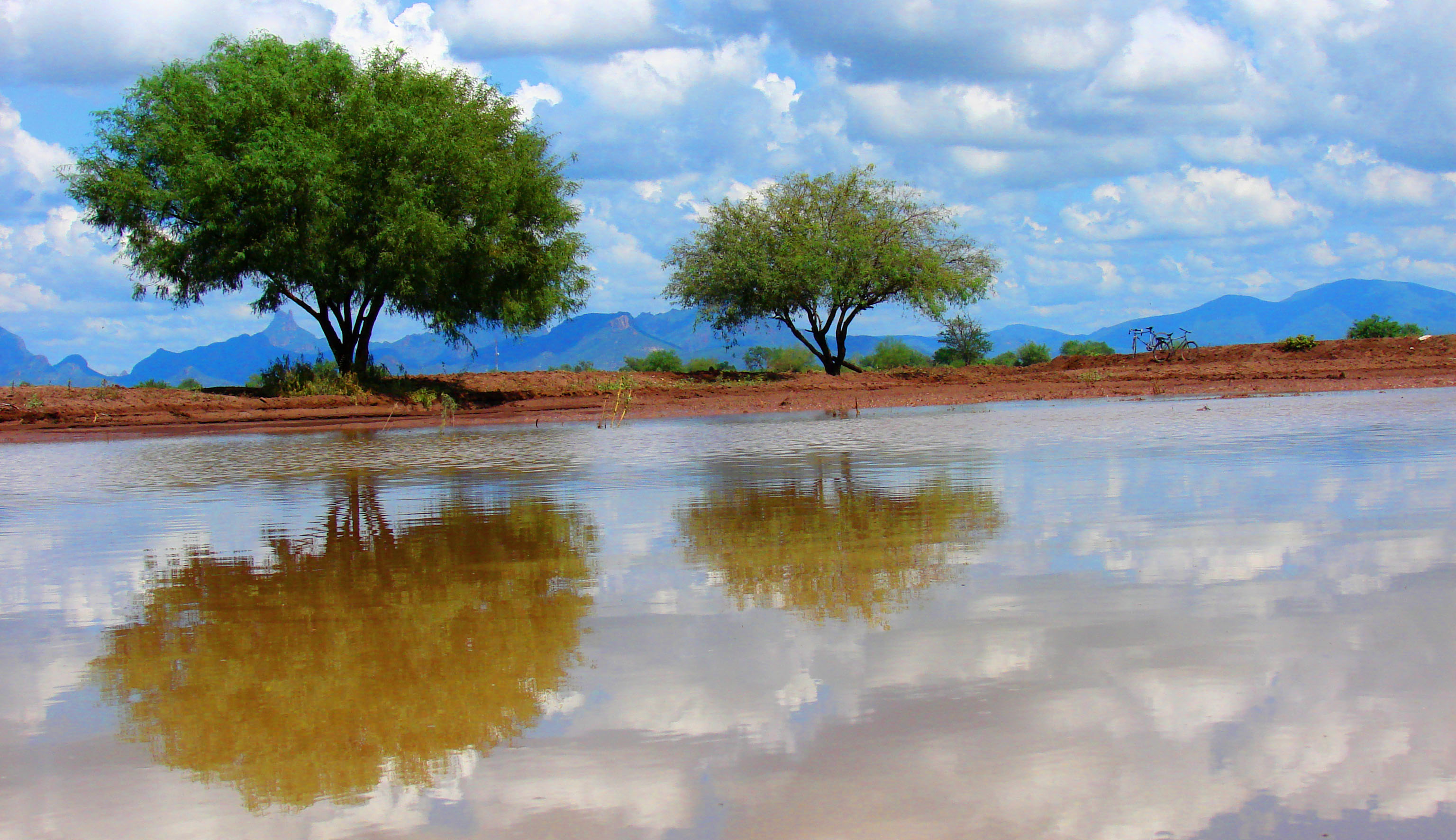
Etchohuaquila, Navojoa, Sonora

Etchohuaquila is a small town within the municipality of Navojoa, in the Mexican state of Sonora. 27°18′53″N 109°45′37″W. It is about 25 km (16 mi) southeast of Ciudad Obregón. It is known for being the birthplace and hometown of former Major League Baseball pitcher Fernando Valenzuela.
