= Joey Meneses =

Mexican baseball player (born 1992)

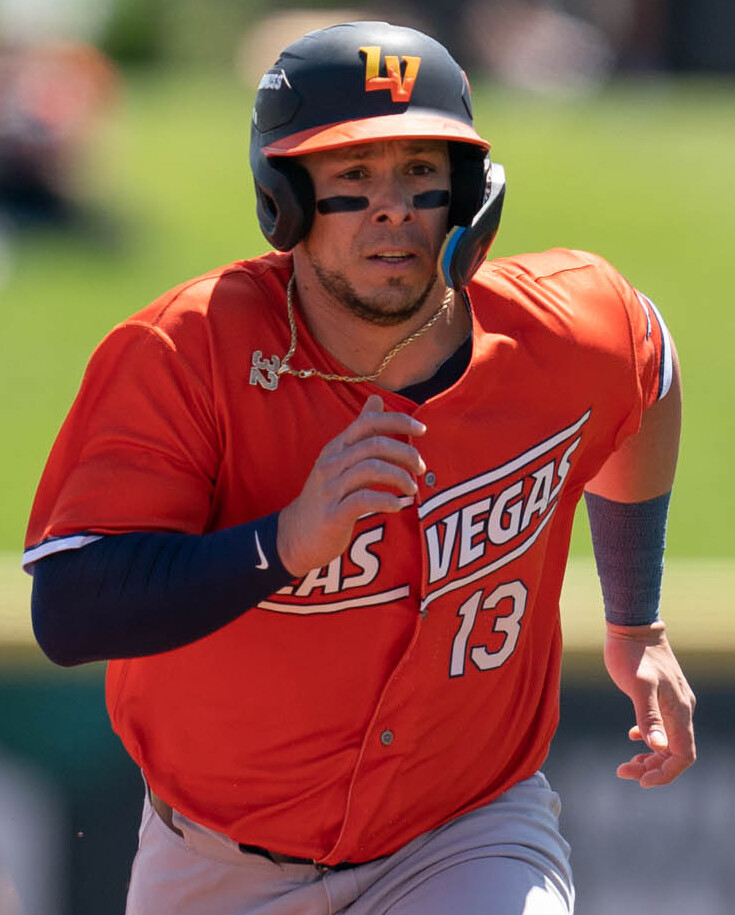
- Meneses with the Las Vegas Aviators in 2026

Free agent
- First baseman / Outfielder
- Born: May 6, 1992 (age 34); Culiacán, Mexico
- Bats: Right Throws: Right

Professional debut
- NPB: March 29, 2019, for the Orix Buffaloes
- MLB: August 2, 2022, for the Washington Nationals

NPB statistics (through 2019 season)
- Batting average: .206
- Home runs: 4
- Runs batted in: 14

MLB statistics (through 2026 season)
- Batting average: .272
- Home runs: 29
- Runs batted in: 167
- Stats at Baseball Reference

Teams
- Orix Buffaloes (2019); Washington Nationals (2022–2024); Athletics (2026)
Medals
Men's baseball
Representing Mexico
World Baseball Classic
Bronze medal – third place	2023 Miami	Team

Joey Meneses Ramírez (born May 6, 1992) is a Mexican professional baseball first baseman and outfielder who is a free agent. He has previously played in Major League Baseball (MLB) for the Washington Nationals and Athletics and in Nippon Professional Baseball (NPB) for the Orix Buffaloes. He made his MLB debut in 2022.

== Professional career ==
=== Atlanta Braves ===
Meneses played for several farm teams of the Atlanta Braves from 2011 through 2017.

After the 2013, 2014, and 2015 seasons, he played for Tomateros de Culiacán of the Mexican Pacific League (LMP). In 2016, Meneses first reached the Double-A level, playing for the Mississippi Braves. After the 2016 season, he played for Tomateros of the LMP.

For the 2017 season with Mississippi, he registered a .292 batting average with 9 home runs and 45 RBIs in 108 games; he was also a mid-season Southern League all star. He was named an MILB.com Organization All Star in 2014 and 2017. On November 6, 2017, Meneses became a free agent. After the 2017 season, he played for Tomateros of the LMP.

=== Philadelphia Phillies ===
The Philadelphia Phillies signed Meneses to a minor league contract on February 1, 2018. He spent the 2018 season with the Triple-A Lehigh Valley IronPigs. He went on to win the 2018 International League MVP, registering a .311 batting average with 23 home runs and 82 RBIs in 130 games. On October 29, 2018, Meneses was released by the Phillies. He subsequently signed to play in Japan for 2019. After the 2018 season, he played for Tomateros of the LMP.

=== Orix Buffaloes ===
On October 29, 2018, Meneses signed a one-year contract worth an estimated 100 million yen, equivalent to approximately US $950,000, with the Orix Buffaloes of Nippon Professional Baseball. On March 29, 2019, he made his NPB debut. On June 27, 2019, Meneses was suspended for 12 months after testing positive for the banned substance hydroxystanozolol. That same day, he became a free agent. After the 2019 season, he played for Tomateros of the LMP.

=== Boston Red Sox ===
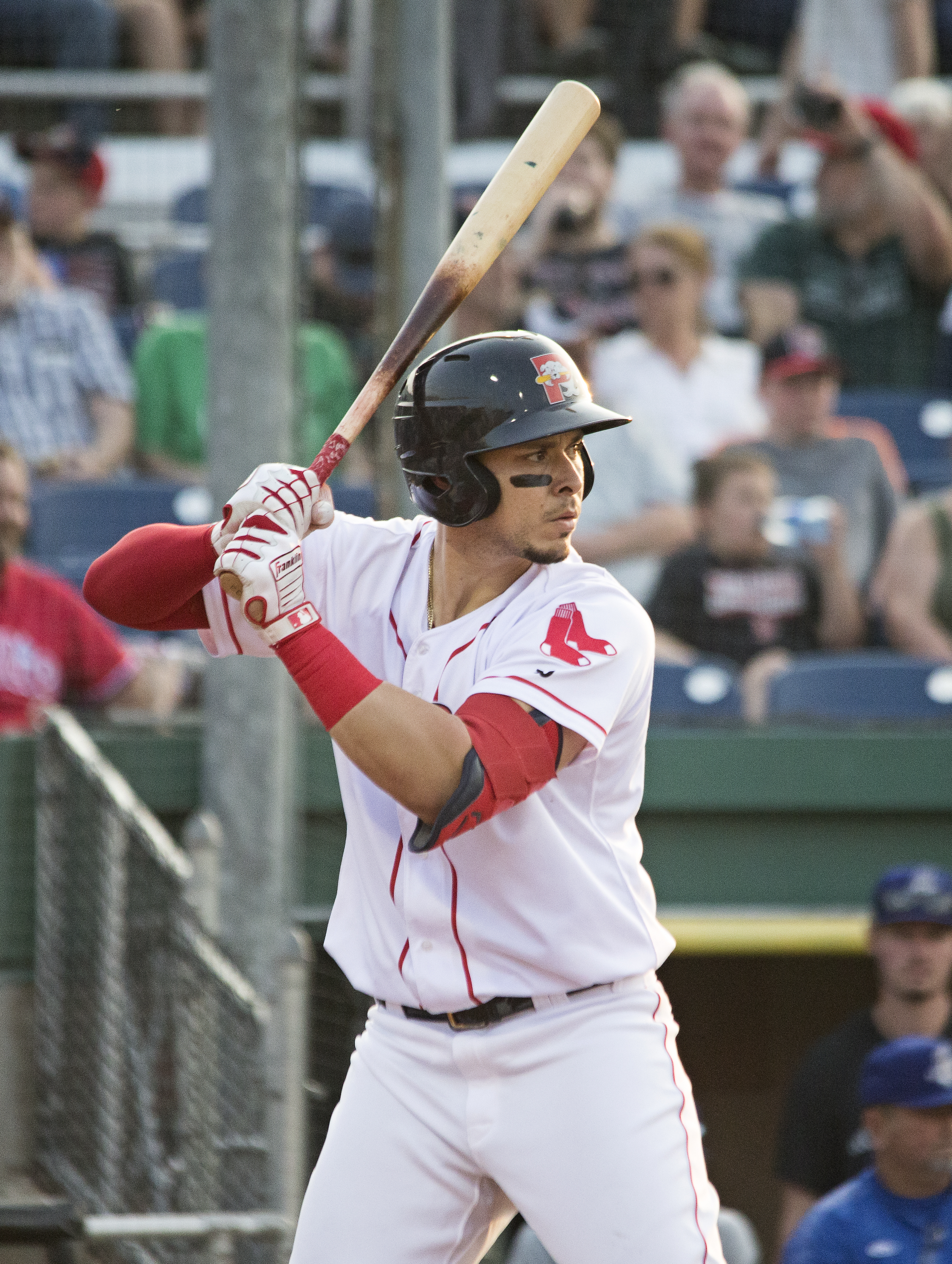
Meneses with the Sea Dogs in 2021

On January 23, 2020, Meneses signed a minor league deal with the Boston Red Sox. After the 2020 minor league season was canceled, he was re-signed by the Red Sox in early November to a minor-league deal. After the 2020 season, he played for Tomateros de Culiacán of the LMP. He was assigned to the Portland Sea Dogs of Double-A Northeast to begin the 2021 season, and was promoted to the Worcester Red Sox of Triple-A East in early August. He elected free agency following the season on November 7, 2021.

=== Washington Nationals ===
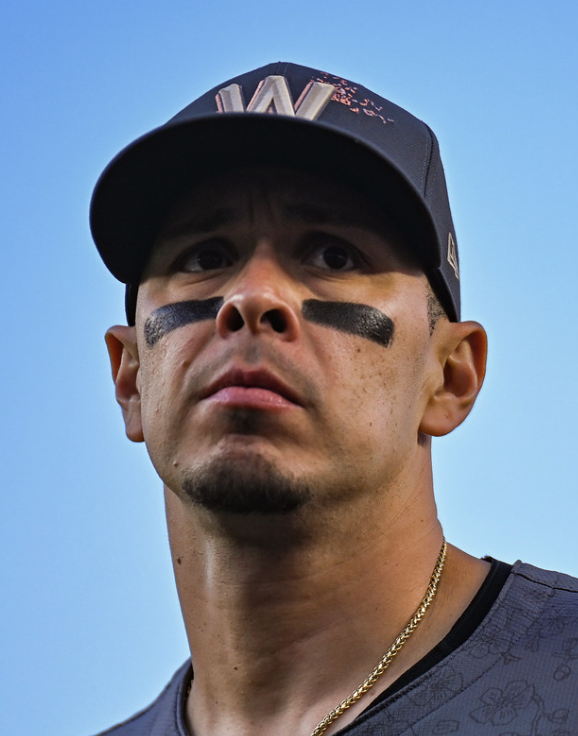
Meneses with the Washington Nationals in 2024

On January 13, 2022, Meneses signed a minor league contract with the Washington Nationals. On August 2, after trading outfielder Juan Soto and first baseman Josh Bell to the San Diego Padres, the Nationals called up Meneses from the Triple–A Rochester Red Wings, and he made his major league debut against the New York Mets. Meneses hit a home run off of Yoan López to lead off the seventh inning for his first major league hit. Meneses went 0–for–4 the next game, but subsequently embarked on an 11 game hitting streak, and continued to hit well throughout August, putting up a slash line of .354/.385/.626 and hitting seven home runs through his first 25 games in the majors. On September 1, Meneses hit a walk-off home run against the Oakland Athletics which gave the Nationals their first walk-off win of the year. On September 16, with the Nationals down 4–0 to the Miami Marlins, Meneses hit an inside-the-park home run and later scored the winning run in a 5–4 Washington victory.

He finished the season batting .324 with a .367 on-base percentage, .563 slugging percentage, 13 home runs, and 34 RBI. Meneses was named to the MLB Pipeline All-Rookie Team.

In July 2024, the Nationals optioned Meneses to Triple–A after he experienced struggles. In 76 total games for Washington, he slashed .231/.291/.302 with 3 home runs and 42 RBI. On November 4, Meneses was removed from the 40–man roster and sent outright to Rochester, but he rejected the assignment and elected free agency.

=== New York Mets ===
On November 21, 2024, Meneses signed a minor league contract with the New York Mets. He made 110 appearances for the Triple-A Syracuse Mets, slashing .265/.322/.447 with 11 home runs and 55 RBI. Meneses elected free agency following the season on November 6, 2025.

=== Athletics ===
On November 15, 2025, Meneses signed a minor league contract with the Athletics. He began the 2026 season with the Triple-A Las Vegas Aviators, batting .348/.401/.543 with 11 home runs and 76 RBI across his first 69 appearances. On June 21, the Athletics selected Meneses' contract, adding him to their active roster. He made nine appearances for the team, going 3-for-20 (.150) with two RBI and three walks. Meneses was designated for assignment by the Athletics on July 18. He cleared waivers and was sent outright to Triple-A Las Vegas on July 20. He elected free agency on September 29.

== International career ==
Meneses has played for Mexico in the Caribbean Series of 2015, 2018, 2020, 2021, and 2022.

In February 2019, Meneses was selected to the Mexico national baseball team for 2019 exhibition games against Japan.

Meneses was selected for a second time to the national team in the 2020 Summer Olympics (contested in 2021), in Tokyo.

Meneses played for Mexico in the 2023 World Baseball Classic (WBC), hitting two home runs in a game against the United States in pool play. He played for Mexico again in the 2026 WBC, batting 3-for-6 with two runs scored.

== Personal life ==
Meneses has said that he is big fan of Goku and that it was one reason why he joined a Japanese team.

Meneses and his fiancee, who has played professional volleyball, have two children.
