= Oscar Azócar =

Venezuelan baseball player (1965-2010)

- Left fielder
- Born: February 21, 1965; Soro, Sucre, Venezuela
- Died: June 14, 2010 (aged 45); Valencia, Carabobo, Venezuela
- Batted: Left Threw: Left

MLB debut
- July 17, 1990, for the New York Yankees

Last MLB appearance
- October 4, 1992, for the San Diego Padres

MLB statistics
- Batting average: .226
- Home runs: 5
- Runs batted in: 36
- Stats at Baseball Reference

Teams
- New York Yankees (1990); San Diego Padres (1991–1992)

Member of the Caribbean

Baseball Hall of Fame
- Induction: 2010

Oscar Gregorio Azócar (February 21, 1965 – June 14, 2010) was a Venezuelan left fielder in Major League Baseball who played for the New York Yankees (1990) and San Diego Padres (1991-'92). Listed at 6' 1", 170 lb., Azócar batted and threw left-handed. In 202 career games, Azócar recorded a batting average of .226 and accumulated 10 stolen bases, and 36 runs batted in (RBI).

== Career ==
Azócar was born in Soro, Sucre, Venezuela. After attending high school in Venezuela, he was signed by the New York Yankees as an amateur free agent on November 22, 1983.

Until 1987 Azócar posted a record of 14–5 with a 2.30 earned run average as a professional pitcher, but then switched to the outfield. Azócar was a classic example of the impatient hitter who would swing at almost anything and usually put it in play. It took him 100 Major League at-bats to draw his first walk. He normally obliged the pitchers by hitting whatever they threw, and his batting average dropped accordingly.

In a three-season career, Azócar was a .226 hitter (99-for-439) with five home runs and 36 runs batted in in 202 games, including 38 runs scored, 16 doubles, 10 stolen bases and 12 base on balls. Despite his free-swinging style, he had only 36 strikeouts in 439 at-bats (one every 12 at-bats). Azócar also used his speed selectively and never was caught stealing.

== Death ==
Azócar died in 2010 in Valencia, Carabobo, at the age of 45 of a heart attack. The same year, he was inducted in the Caribbean Baseball Hall of Fame for his notable contributions in the Caribbean Series.

== See also ==
- List of players from Venezuela in Major League Baseball
