= Isidro Márquez =

Mexican baseball player (born 1965)

Acereros de Monclova – No. 33
- Pitcher / Coach
- Born: May 14, 1965 (age 61); Navojoa, Sonora, Mexico
- Batted: Right Threw: Right

MLB debut
- April 26, 1995, for the Chicago White Sox

Last MLB appearance
- May 12, 1995, for the Chicago White Sox

MLB statistics
- Win–loss record: 0–1
- Earned run average: 6.75
- Strikeouts: 8
- Stats at Baseball Reference

Teams
- Chicago White Sox (1995)

Member of the Mexican Professional

Baseball Hall of Fame
- Induction: 2020

Isidro Márquez Espinoza (born May 14, 1965) is a Mexican former professional baseball pitcher who currently serves as the pitching coach for the Acereros de Monclova of the Mexican League. He played in Major League Baseball (MLB) for the Chicago White Sox.

== Playing career ==
Márquez played during one season at the major league level for the Chicago White Sox. He was purchased by the Los Angeles Dodgers from the Mexican League's Tuneros de San Luis in 1988. Márquez played his first professional season (in American baseball) with their High-A affiliate, the Bakersfield Dodgers in 1988, and his last affiliated season with the White Sox and their Triple-A Nashville Sounds in 1995.

In 2000, Márquez made a comeback with the Piratas de Campeche of the Mexican League. He pitched in Mexico through 2011.

In 2020, Márquez was inducted into the Mexican Professional Baseball Hall of Fame. In 2021, the Piratas retired Márquez's 33 number. On 30 October 2022, the Águilas de Mexicali also retired Márquez's 33 number.

In February 2025, Márquez was selected by a committee of journalists as a pitcher for the Mexican League Centennial All-Time Team on the occasion of the league's hundredth anniversary.

== Coaching career ==
Márquez spent the 2025 season as a coach for the Toros de Tijuana of the Mexican League. On November 9, 2025, Márquez was fired by the Toros.

On November 19, 2025, Márquez was hired to serve as the pitching coach for the Acereros de Monclova of the Mexican League.
