= Ever Magallanes =

Mexican baseball player (born 1965)

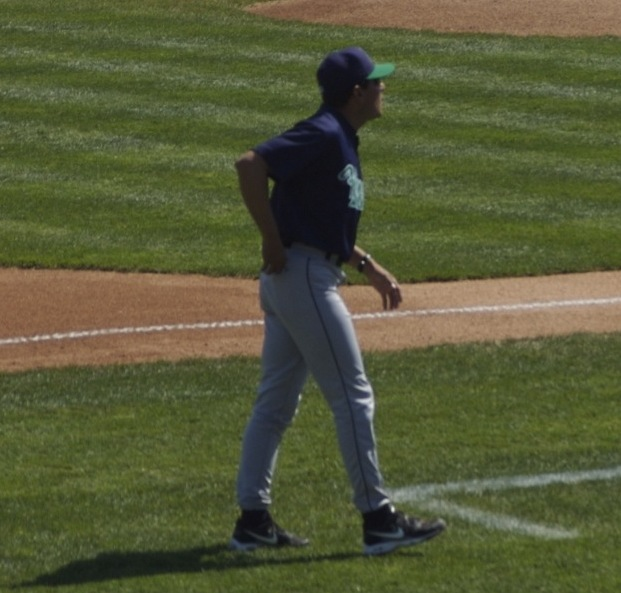
- Magallanes with the Cedar Rapids Kernels in 2007
- Shortstop
- Born: November 6, 1965 (age 60); El Sauz, Chihuahua, Mexico
- Batted: Left Threw: Right

MLB debut
- May 17, 1991, for the Cleveland Indians

Last MLB appearance
- May 22, 1991, for the Cleveland Indians

MLB statistics
- Games played: 3
- At bats: 2
- Walks: 1
- Stats at Baseball Reference

Teams
- Cleveland Indians (1991)

Member of the Caribbean

Baseball Hall of Fame
- Induction: 2013

Everardo "Ever" Magallanes Espinoza (born November 6, 1965) is a Mexican former Major League Baseball shortstop who played for the Cleveland Indians in 1991. He attended Bell High School in Bell, California, while being raised in neighboring Maywood.

== Amateur career ==
Magallanes attended Cerritos College and Texas A&M University. In 1986, he played collegiate summer baseball with the Falmouth Commodores of the Cape Cod Baseball League. He was selected by the Cleveland Indians in the 10th round of the 1987 MLB draft.

== Professional career ==
Magallanes had a long minor league career including some time with the farm systems of the Indians, Chicago White Sox, Texas Rangers, and Arizona Diamondbacks. While with the Kinston Indians, Magallanes earned a spot on the 1988 Carolina League all-star squad.

He made the majors in 1991 with Cleveland. He saw action in three games as a shortstop. He compiled a walk and a .000 batting average in three plate appearances.

== Coaching career ==
Magallanes was the manager of the AZL Angels in 2006, winning the second-half title, and then replaced younger brother Bobby Magallanes as manager of the Cedar Rapids Kernels in 2007. After winning the second-half title with the Kernels, he spent 2008 managing the Rancho Cucamonga Quakes of the class 'A' California League and took the team to within one game of the California League playoffs before losing a play-in game to Inland Empire. Once Magallanes joined the White Sox, he took over as the Birmingham Barons manager in 2009 and served until 2010.

In 2013, he was enshrined into the Caribbean Baseball Hall of Fame.

In 2026, he was hired as a coach for the ACL Angels the rookie-level affiliate of the Los Angeles Angels.
