= Caribbean Baseball Hall of Fame =

Baseball hall of fame

The Caribbean Baseball Hall of Fame (Spanish: Pabellón de la Fama del Caribe) was established in 1996 by Juan Francisco Puello Herrera, commissioner of the Caribbean Professional Baseball Confederation (CPBC).

It honors the most prominent baseball players who have made significant achievements in the Caribbean Series, as well as efforts to honor people who have contributed to the development of Caribbean baseball.

In February each year, during the course of the Series, the winners are voted in by journalists, radio and television broadcasters, as well as baseball historians from Mexico, Puerto Rico, Venezuela and the Dominican Republic. Each nominee has to receive at least the minimum seventy-five percent of votes to secure his enshrinement in the Hall, just like it is for the Major Leagues.

Since 2009, the prize is awarded to personalities born in the host country of the Series.

== List of inductees ==
=== 1996 ===
Name	Country	Position	Series	Highlights	Refs
Willard Brown	United States	Outfielder	3	Most Valuable Player (1953)	
Rico Carty	Dominican Republic	Outfielder	3	Most Valuable Player (1977)	
Héctor Espino	Mexico	Infielder	7	Most Valuable Player (1974, 1976)	
Camilo Pascual	Cuba	Pitcher	3	Tied for the most all-time wins (6)	

=== 1998 ===
Name	Country	Position	Series	Highlights	Refs
Tony Armas	Venezuela	Outfielder	9	Set all-time record in home runs (11)	
Manny Mota	Dominican Republic	Outfielder	6	Most Valuable Player (1971)	
Tony Pérez	Cuba	Infielder	4	Most Valuable Player (1967)	
Héctor Rodríguez	Cuba	Infielder	4	Champion bat (1950)	

=== 1999 ===
Name	Country	Position	Series	Highlights	Refs
Sandy Amorós	Cuba	Outfielder	4	Champion bat (1952)	
Pedro Borbón	Dominican Republic	Pitcher	5		
George Brunet	United States	Pitcher	5		
Rubén Gómez	Puerto Rico	Pitcher	7	Tied for the most all-time wins (6)	

=== 2000 ===
Name	Country	Position	Series	Highlights	Refs
Luis García	Venezuela	Infielder	8	Champion bat (1959); all-time leader in 2Bs, runs and games	
Héctor López	Panama	Infielder	5		
Orlando Peña	Cuba	Pitcher	4		
Juan Pizarro	Puerto Rico	Pitcher	5	All-time strikeouts leader (62)	

=== 2001 ===
Name	Country	Position	Series	Highlights	Refs
José Bracho	Venezuela	Pitcher	6	Tied for the most all-time wins (6)	
Wilmer Fields	United States	Outfielder	3	First grand slam in Series history (1949)	
Humberto Robinson	Panama	Pitcher	6		
Vicente Romo	Mexico	Pitcher	9		

=== 2002 ===
Name	Country	Position	Series	Highlights	Refs
Luis Arroyo	Puerto Rico	Pitcher	4		

=== 2003 ===
Name	Country	Position	Series	Highlights	Refs
Pablo Morales	Venezuela	Executive			
Rodrigo Otero	Puerto Rico	Executive			
Oscar Prieto	Venezuela	Executive			
Felo Ramírez	Cuba	Broadcaster			
José Santiago	Puerto Rico	Pitcher	6		

=== 2004 ===
Name	Country	Position	Series	Highlights	Refs
George Bell	Dominican Republic	Outfielder	2		
Carmelo Martínez	Puerto Rico	Outfielder	1	Most Valuable Player (1987)	
Luis Olmo	Puerto Rico	Outfielder	4	Most Valuable Player (1951)	
Monchín Pichardo	Dominican Republic	Executive			
Vic Power	Puerto Rico	Infielder	8		
Diego Seguí	Cuba	Pitcher	4		

=== 2005 ===
Name	Country	Position	Series	Highlights	Refs
Rod Carew	Panama	Infielder	1		
Horacio López Díaz	Mexico	Executive			
Willie Mays	United States	Outfielder	1		
Minnie Miñoso	Cuba	Outfielder	2		
Juan Navarrete	Mexico	Infielder	5	Champion bat (1995)	
Armando Rodríguez	Cuba	Umpire	16		
Víctor Sáiz	Mexico	Umpire	17		

=== 2006 ===
Name	Country	Position	Series	Highlights	Refs
Dave Concepción	Venezuela	Infielder	5		
Celerino Sánchez	Mexico	Infielder	4		
Pedro Formental	Cuba	Outfielder	3		
Jerry White	United States	Outfielder	3	Champion bat (1979)	

=== 2007 ===
Name	Country	Position	Series	Highlights	Refs
Nelson Barrera	Mexico	Infielder	5		
Héctor Cruz	Puerto Rico	Outfielder/Infielder	4		
Edgar Martínez	Puerto Rico	Infielder	3		
Oswaldo Olivares	Venezuela	Outfielder	4		
Pedro Padrón Panza	Venezuela	Executive			
Pedrín Zorrilla	Puerto Rico	Executive			

=== 2008 ===
Name	Country	Position	Series	Highlights	Refs
Ubaldo Heredia	Venezuela	Pitcher	5		
Winston Llenas	Dominican Republic	Utility Player	3		
Dickie Thon	Puerto Rico	Infielder	4		

=== 2009 ===
Name	Country	Position	Series	Highlights	Refs
Eduardo Acosta	Mexico	Pitcher	3		
Mercedes Esquer	Mexico	Pitcher	7		

=== 2010 ===
Name	Country	Position	Series	Highlights	Refs
Wilson Álvarez	Venezuela	Pitcher	4		
Oscar Azócar	Venezuela	Outfielder	3		

=== 2011 ===
Name	Country	Position	Series	Highlights	Refs
Roberto Alomar	Puerto Rico	Infielder	4	Most Valuable Player (1995)	
Carlos Baerga	Puerto Rico	Infielder	7		
Luis DeLeón	Puerto Rico	Pitcher	12	All-time record for the most appearances	
Candy Maldonado	Puerto Rico	Outfielder	3		

=== 2012 ===
Name	Country	Position	Series	Highlights	Refs
Joaquín Andújar	Dominican Republic	Pitcher	3		
Neifi Pérez	Dominican Republic	Infielder	3	Most Valuable Player (1998, 1999)	

=== 2013 ===
Name	Country	Position	Series	Highlights	Refs
Houston Jiménez	Mexico	Shortstop	4		
Francisco Estrada	Mexico	Catcher/Manager	13		
Arturo León Lerma	Mexico	Executive			
Ever Magallanes	Mexico	Shortstop	3		
Fernando Valenzuela	Mexico	Pitcher	3		
Renato Vega	Mexico	Executive			

=== 2014 ===
Name	Country	Position	Series	Highlights	Refs
Jesús Alfaro	Venezuela	Third baseman	4		
Álvaro Espinoza	Venezuela	Shortstop			
Carlos Quintana	Venezuela	First baseman			

=== 2015 ===
Name	Country	Position	Series	Highlights	Refs
Roberto Clemente	Puerto Rico	Right fielder			
Juan González	Puerto Rico	Right fielder			
Conrado Marrero	Cuba	Pitcher		First Latin pitcher to threw a shutout (1954)	
Napoleón Reyes	Cuba	Manager		Only manager to win consecutive titles (1957–1958)	
Héctor Villanueva	Puerto Rico	Catcher		Most Valuable Player (1993); Three-time leader in RBI (1990; 1992–1993)	
Bernie Williams	Puerto Rico	Center fielder			

=== 2016 ===
Name	Country	Position	Series	Highlights	Refs
Felipe Alou	Dominican Republic	Manager	5	Won the Series title in 1990	
Tony Peña	Dominican Republic	Catcher	8		
Luis Polonia	Dominican Republic	Left fielder	14	All-time leader in games played, at-bats, hits and doubles	
Gerónimo Berroa	Dominican Republic	Right fielder	6	Two-time MVP Award (1990–1991); Two-time leader in RBI (1990, 1991)	

=== 2024 ===
Name	Country	Position	Series	Highlights	Refs
Francisco Campos	Mexico	Pitcher	6	Won the Series title twice (2002, 2005); Earned MVP Award (2005)	
Jesús Feliciano	Puerto Rico	Outfielder	6		
Julián Tavárez	Dominican Republic	Pitcher	8	Won the Series title 5 times (1994, 1997, 1998, 2001, 2007)	
César Tovar	Venezuela	Infielder	4	Won the Series title in 1970	

=== 2025 ===
Name	Country	Position	Series	Highlights	Refs
Karim García	Mexico	Outfielder	6	Won the Series title twice (2011, 2013)	
Álvaro Ley	Mexico	Executive	6	Won the Series title twice (1996, 2002)	

== See also ==
- National Baseball Hall of Fame and Museum
- Baseball awards § Americas
