= Clay Dungan =

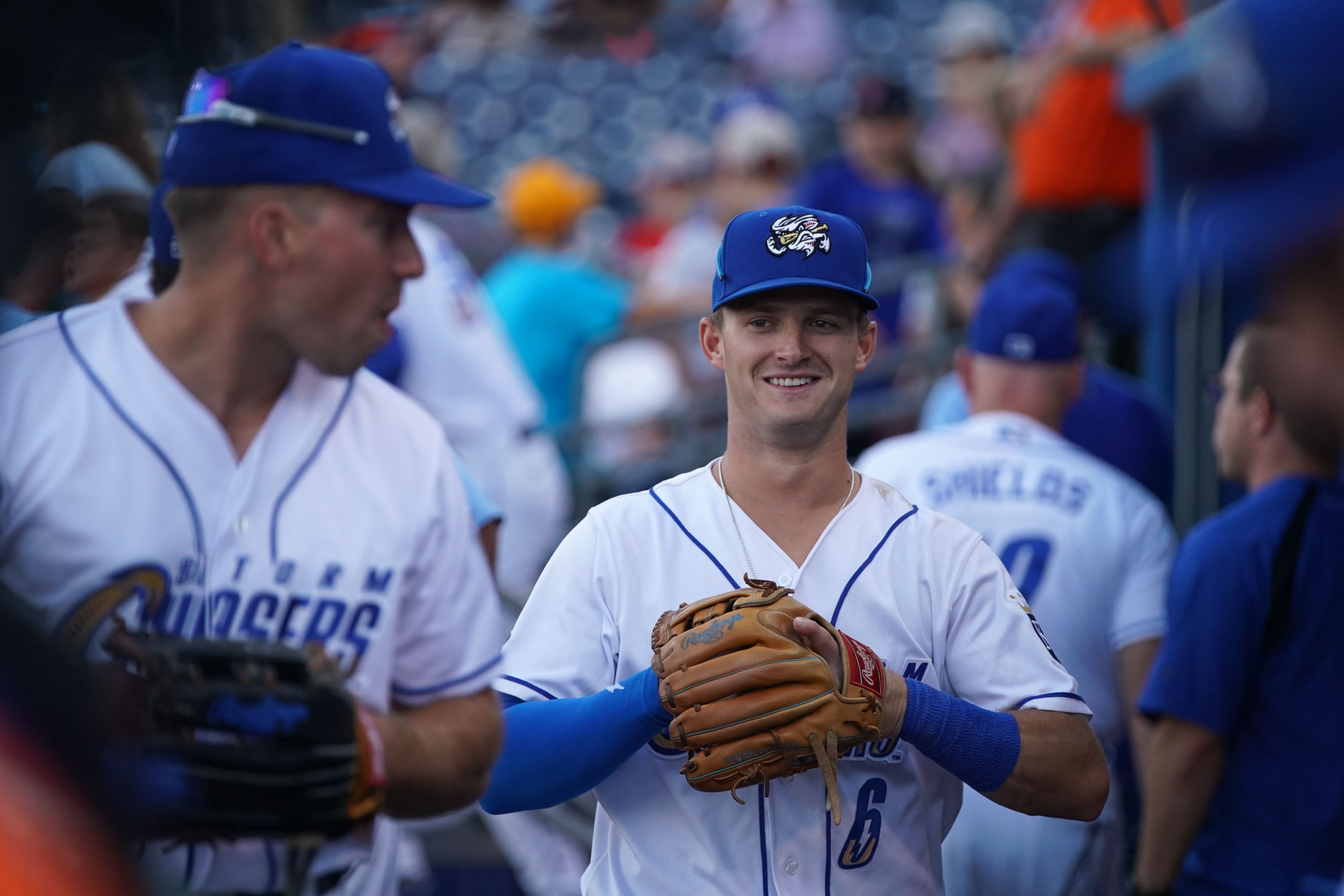
- Dungan with the Omaha Storm Chasers in 2022

Free agent
- Infielder
- Born: June 2, 1996 (age 30); Muncie, Indiana, U.S.
- Bats: Left Throws: Right
- Stats at Baseball Reference

Anthony Clay Dungan (born June 2, 1996) is an American professional baseball infielder who is a free agent.

== Amateur career ==
Dungan attended Yorktown High School in Yorktown, Indiana, where he played baseball. He batted .488 with 13 steals as a senior in 2015. After graduating, he enrolled at Indiana State University where he played college baseball and batted .305 with nine home runs, 38 RBIs, and ten doubles over 61 starts as a senior in 2019.

== Professional career ==
Dungan was selected by the Kansas City Royals in the ninth round of the 2019 Major League Baseball draft.

Dungan signed with the Royals and made his professional debut with the Idaho Falls Chukars with whom he was named an All-Star. Over 65 games, he hit .357 with two home runs, 38 RBIs, and 19 doubles. He did not play a game in 2020 due to the cancellation of the minor league season. In 2021, he played with the Northwest Arkansas Naturals and slashed .288/.357/.405 with nine home runs, 56 RBIs, and 28 stolen bases over 108 games. He was assigned to the Omaha Storm Chasers for the 2022 season. Over 127 games, he compiled a .208/.294/.334 slash line with nine home runs, 52 RBIs, and 17 stolen bases. He returned to Omaha in 2023, hitting .273 with three home runs, thirty RBIs, and 16 stolen bases over 89 games.

On December 6, 2023, the San Diego Padres selected Dungan in the minor league phase of the Rule 5 draft. He split the 2024 season between the San Antonio Missions and El Paso Chihuahuas, batting .242 with nine home runs, 71 RBIs, and 25 stolen bases over 127 games. Dungan was assigned to El Paso for the 2025 season and hit .273 with 14 home runs, 80 RBIs and 30 stolen bases over 140 games. He returned to El Paso for the 2026 season and batted .228 with nine home runs and 40 RBIs over 100 games. He elected free agency on November 2.
