= Darrell Sherman =

American baseball player (born 1967)

- Outfielder
- Born: December 4, 1967 (age 58); Los Angeles, California
- Batted: Left Threw: Left

MLB debut
- April 8, 1993, for the San Diego Padres

Last MLB appearance
- May 22, 1993, for the San Diego Padres

MLB statistics
- Batting average: .222
- Home runs: 0
- Runs batted in: 2
- Stats at Baseball Reference

Teams
- San Diego Padres (1993)

Darrell Edward Sherman (born December 4, 1967) is an American former professional baseball outfielder.

Sherman graduated from Lynwood High School in California and began his college baseball career at Cerritos College. The team had a record of 84–11 in his two years at the school. In 1988, he set school records in runs scored, walks, times on base and stolen bases. Sherman chose to continue his college baseball career at Long Beach State after reneging on a commitment to play at Cal State Fullerton. In 1989, Sherman helped lead the Dirtbags to the College World Series.

Sherman was selected by the San Diego Padres in the sixth round of the 1989 Major League Baseball draft. In December 1991, Sherman was selected by the Baltimore Orioles in the Rule 5 draft. Sherman was expected to compete for Baltimore's leadoff spot or a fifth outfielder role but was ultimately returned to the Padres before the start of the 1992 season.

Sherman spent the subsequent year in the minors and was promoted to San Diego's 40-man roster for the first time in the November following the 1992 season.

He made his Major League debut on April 8, 1993 against the Pittsburgh Pirates at Three Rivers Stadium. He entered the game in the sixth inning as a pinch hitter for Roger Mason and hit a double off of Bob Walk. Sherman would go on to play in 37 of the team's first 42 games of the season. He played in his 37th and final Major League game on May 22, 1993.

He continued to play professionally until 2006, spending the last seven seasons of his career in the Mexican League.

Prior to the 2008 season, Sherman was named the hitting coach of the Eugene Emeralds. He has also served as a coach for Long Beach Wilson High School and the Tomateros de Culiacán and at Cerritos College.
