= Dave Machemer =

American baseball player (born 1951)

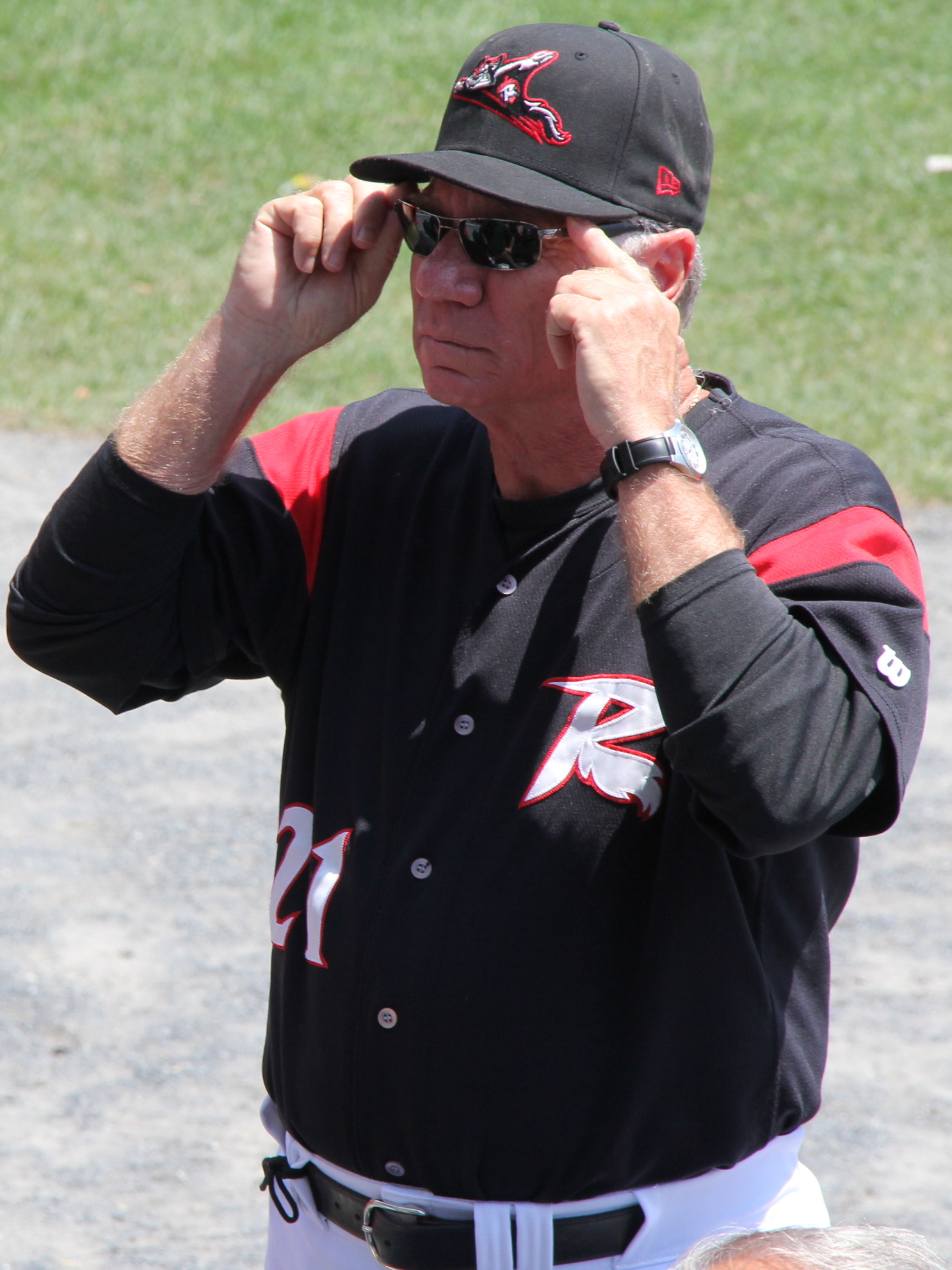
- Machemer as manager of the Richmond Flying Squirrels in 2013
- Second baseman
- Born: May 24, 1951 (age 74); St. Joseph, Michigan, U.S.
- Batted: Right Threw: Right

MLB debut
- June 21, 1978, for the California Angels

Last MLB appearance
- July 2, 1979, for the Detroit Tigers

MLB statistics
- Batting average: .229
- Home runs: 1
- Runs batted in: 4
- Stats at Baseball Reference

Teams
- California Angels (1978); Detroit Tigers (1979)

David Ritchie Machemer (/ˈmɑːkɛmər/ MAHK-eh-mer; born May 24, 1951) is an American former professional baseball player, scout, and minor league manager. He played in Major League Baseball as a second baseman from 1978 to 1979 for the California Angels and Detroit Tigers. Machemer was most recently a special assignment scout for the Baltimore Orioles. Machemer threw and batted right-handed, stood 5 feet 11 inches (1.80 m) tall and weighed 180 pounds (82 kg). Over his 11-season minor league playing career, he batted .277 with 1,078 hits in 1,126 games played.

== Biography ==
Machemer was born in St. Joseph, Michigan. He attended Benton Harbor High School in Benton Harbor, Michigan where he was teammates with Don Hopkins.

His professional baseball career began in June 1972, when he was selected by the Angels in the fourth round of the amateur draft. He made his major-league debut at the age of 27 for the California Angels on June 21, 1978, playing second base and leading off against the Minnesota Twins. In his first major-league at-bat, versus Twins pitcher Geoff Zahn, Machemer hit a home run to deep left field, making him one of only 118 players in major-league history to homer in his first at-bat. That home run would prove to be his only major-league home run. Machemer has recorded over 1,600 victories in 23 seasons since his managerial debut in 1985. He led the Stockton Ports to the California League championship in 1986 and guided the AZL Giants to their third league title in five years with a win over the AZL Angels on August 31, 2008.

Machemer also spent time as a minor league manager or coordinator with the Milwaukee Brewers (1985–91), Montreal Expos (1992–95) and the Orioles (1996–2002).

Machemer came to the San Francisco Giants' system in 2005 after working the previous three years with the Montreal Expos organization (2002–04). He was at Double-A Harrisburg in 2003–04 when he earned his 1,000th triumph on August 22, 2003. With the Giants, Machemer guided the Double-A Norwich Navigators to a 71–71 record in 2005, then took the Connecticut Defenders to a 64–77 mark in 2006, and 41–58 ledger in 2007.

In 2008, the veteran minor league skipper returned for his fourth season with the Giants' organization, his first at the helm of the Arizona League Giants, a rookie-level team based in Scottsdale, Arizona. Machemer managed the previous three years at Double-A Connecticut. After winning the 2008 AZL championship, he was promoted to the Class A Augusta GreenJackets of the South Atlantic League (2009–10), then back to Double-A with the Richmond Flying Squirrels of the Eastern League (2011–13). Machemer then returned to the Baltimore organization in 2014 as a scout.

Other managerial stops have included: Double-A Bowie (2001), Class A Advanced Frederick (2000), Triple-A Rochester (1999), Class A Delmarva (1998), Double-A El Paso (1988 and 1996–97), Triple-A Denver (1989–90), Class A Advanced Stockton (1986–87) and Rookie-level Beloit (1985).

Dave is the Head Varsity Baseball Coach for Lakeshore High School in Stevensville, Michigan.

Preceded by Tom Trebelhorn	Delmarva Shorebirds manager 1998	Succeeded by Butch Davis
Preceded by Marv Foley	Rochester Red Wings manager 1999	Succeeded by Marv Foley
Preceded by Andy Etchebarren	Frederick Keys manager 2000	Succeeded by Dave Cash
Preceded by Andy Etchebarren	Bowie Baysox manager 2001	Succeeded by Dave Cash
Preceded by Dave Huppert	Harrisburg Senators manager 2003–2004	Succeeded by Keith Bodie
Preceded by Shane Turner	Norwich Navigators/ Connecticut Defenders manager 2005–2007	Succeeded by Shane Turner
Preceded by Andy Skeels	Richmond Flying Squirrels manager 2011–2013	Succeeded by Russ Morman
