= Karim García =

Mexican baseball player (born 1975)

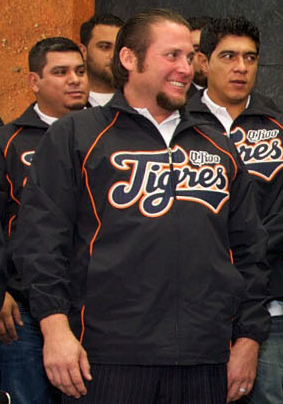
- García at Los Pinos with the Tigres de Quintana Roo in 2013

Conspiradores de Querétaro – No. 95
- Right fielder / Manager / Coach
- Born: October 29, 1975 (age 51); Ciudad Obregón, Mexico
- Batted: Left Threw: Left

Professional debut
- MLB: September 2, 1995, for the Los Angeles Dodgers
- NPB: March 26, 2005, for the Orix Buffaloes
- KBO: March 29, 2008, for the Lotte Giants

Last appearance
- MLB: August 24, 2004, for the Baltimore Orioles
- NPB: September 27, 2006, for the Orix Buffaloes
- KBO: October 4, 2011, for the Hanwha Eagles

MLB statistics
- Batting average: .241
- Home runs: 66
- Runs batted in: 212

NPB statistics
- Batting average: .281
- Home runs: 34
- Runs batted in: 97

KBO statistics
- Batting average: .264
- Home runs: 103
- Runs batted in: 339
- Stats at Baseball Reference

Teams
- Los Angeles Dodgers (1995–1997); Arizona Diamondbacks (1998); Detroit Tigers (1999–2000); Baltimore Orioles (2000); Cleveland Indians (2001); New York Yankees (2002); Cleveland Indians (2002–2003); New York Yankees (2003); New York Mets (2004); Baltimore Orioles (2004); Orix Buffaloes (2005–2006); Lotte Giants (2008–2010); Hanwha Eagles (2011)

Member of the Caribbean

Baseball Hall of Fame
- Induction: 2025
Medals
Men's baseball
Representing Mexico
Pan American Games
| Bronze medal – third place | 2007 Rio de Janeiro | Team |

Gustavo Karim García Aguayo (born October 29, 1975) is a Mexican former professional baseball right fielder who currently serves as the first base coach for the Conspiradores de Querétaro of the Mexican League. He played in Major League Baseball (MLB) from 1995 to 2004 for the Los Angeles Dodgers, Arizona Diamondbacks, Detroit Tigers, Baltimore Orioles, Cleveland Indians, New York Yankees, and New York Mets. He also played in Nippon Professional Baseball (NPB) for the Orix Buffaloes, and in the KBO League for the Lotte Giants and Hanwha Eagles. García bats and throws left-handed.

== Playing career ==
=== Los Angeles Dodgers ===
Born in Ciudad Obregón, Mexico, García signed as an amateur free agent with the Los Angeles Dodgers in 1992 at just sixteen years old. After batting .319 with twenty home runs and 91 runs batted in for the Albuquerque Dukes in 1995, he became the youngest player in Major League Baseball when he debuted with the Dodgers that September. He also received major league calls in 1996 and 1997, but spent most of tenure with the Dodgers as a minor leaguer. In five seasons in their farm system, he compiled a .281 batting average, 98 home runs, and 375 RBI. His first career home run came off of Osvaldo Fernández at Candlestick Park in 1997.

=== Arizona Diamondbacks ===
On November 18, 1997, the Arizona Diamondbacks selected García as the ninth overall pick in the 1997 Major League Baseball expansion draft. He earned a spot on the D-Backs' inaugural season opening day line-up as the starting right-fielder. García hit the second home run in franchise history in the ninth inning of their 9–2 loss to the Colorado Rockies.

=== Detroit Tigers ===
Following just one season in Arizona, García was traded to the Detroit Tigers in exchange for Luis Gonzalez and cash consideration.

On May 28, 1999, García became the 34th player in the history of Major League Baseball to hit a home run over the Tiger Stadium roof in right field, however, he lasted just one full season in Detroit.

=== Baltimore Orioles ===
On June 12, 2000, García was sent to the Baltimore Orioles as part of a conditional deal. He played in eight games for Baltimore, going 0-for-16 with six strikeouts; García also batted .278/.358/.493 with 13 home runs and 54 RBI in 76 games for the Triple-A Rochester Red Wings. García was released by the Orioles on October 17.

=== Cleveland Indians ===
García signed with the Cleveland Indians for the 2001 season, and clubbed 31 home runs for the Triple-A Buffalo Bisons. He joined the Indians that September, and batted .311 with five home runs in just 45 at-bats.

The Indians released García during Spring training 2002. He joined the New York Yankees shortly afterwards only to be released by the Yankees that July and rejoin the Indians. In 51 games for the Tribe, García managed to put up his most impressive stats to date: sixteen home runs, 52 RBI and a .299 batting average.

García's 2002 performance earned him a job as Cleveland's 2003 opening day right fielder, however, a .194 batting average and sloppy play in the outfield caused him to lose his starting job to Jody Gerut by the beginning of May. Shortly afterwards, his contract was purchased by the Yankees.

=== New York Yankees ===
García's numbers improved dramatically upon joining the Yankees, as he batted .305 in 52 games. He also displayed a far steadier glove, committing just two errors.

García is likely best remembered for two incidents in the 2003 American League Championship Series at Fenway Park against the rival Boston Red Sox. Following a Hideki Matsui double that gave the Yankees a 4–2 lead in game three, García was plunked with a Pedro Martínez pitch thrown behind his head. A verbal altercation with Martínez caused benches to empty, and interrupted play. Shortly afterwards, Martínez famously told Peter Gammons during an interview on ESPN:

Karim García, who's Karim García? I have no respect for that guy. I don't have anything to prove to that guy. He needs to be forcing himself to come up to where I am, to my level. When you talk about Jeter, Bernie Williams, Paul O'Neill, guys like that that you really tip your hat, that you can understand. But guys like Karim García, what? So what? Who are you? Who are you Karim García to try to test Pedro Martínez, a proven player for ten years? That's what I don't understand. Why would I hit Karim García?

=== New York Mets ===
In 2004, García moved cross-town to the New York Mets. His brief tenure with the Mets included him and teammate Shane Spencer involved in a physical altercation with a pizza deliveryman in a parking lot, but no charges were filed.

=== Baltimore Orioles (second stint) ===
On July 19, 2004, the Mets traded García to the Baltimore Orioles in exchange for relief pitcher Mike DeJean. He made 23 appearances for Baltimore, batting .212/.247/.348 with three home runs and 11 RBI. The Orioles released García in August 30.

=== Orix Buffaloes ===
García spent the 2005 and 2006 seasons with the Orix Buffaloes of the Nippon Professional Baseball League, batting a combined .281 with 44 homers and 97 RBI. Thanks to the advice of Hideki Matsui, he became more patient than before, adapting to his new environment in Japan. On August 10-August 11, 2005, García hit three home runs in two consecutive games against the Tohoku Rakuten Golden Eagles, becoming the only player in Japanese baseball history to accomplish the feat.

=== Sultanes de Monterrey ===
On January 8, 2007, García signed a minor league contract with the Philadelphia Phillies organization. However, he was released during spring training. García subsequently joined the Sultanes de Monterrey of the Mexican League, and batted .374 with 20 home runs to lead his team to a league championship.

=== Lotte Giants ===
García signed with the Lotte Giants of the KBO League for the 2008 season. He played right field, batted fifth, and was one of the crowd favorites in Busan, posting a .283 batting average with 30 home runs and led the league with 111 RBI in 125 games played. After the season, García won the KBO League Golden Glove Award as an outfielder. García stayed with the Giants through the 2010 season, hitting at least 26 home runs each season he was with team.

=== Sultanes de Monterrey (second stint) ===
In 2011, García returned to the Sultanes de Monterrey of the Mexican League for a second season with the team. In 53 appearances for the Sultanes, he batted .322/.432/.528 with seven home runs, 53 RBI, and three stolen bases.

=== Hanwha Eagles ===
In June 2011, García returned to South Korea to sign with the Hanwha Eagles of the KBO League. He played for the Eagles until the end of the season, batting .246/.308/.493 with 18 home runs and 61 RBI across 72 games.

=== Later career ===
In 2012, García played for the Sultanes de Monterrey of the Mexican League and the Naranjeros de Hermosillo of the Mexican Pacific League.

García spent the 2013 season with Monterrey and the Tigres de Quintana Roo; he remained with Quintana Roo until partway through the 2015 season, when he joined the Olmecas de Tabasco. García split his final professional season between the Saraperos de Saltillo and Diablos Rojos del México in 2016.

In a ten-season major league career, García posted a .241 batting average with 66 home runs and 212 RBI in 488 games played.

== International career ==
García represented his native country, Mexico, as an outfielder on the Mexico national baseball team for the 2006, 2009, and 2013 World Baseball Classic tournaments.

== Coaching career ==
On July 18, 2025, García was hired to serve as the manager for the Tigres de Quintana Roo of the Mexican League, replacing Gregg Zaun.
