= Francisco Estrada =

Mexican baseball player (1948–2019)

- Catcher
- Born: February 12, 1948; Navojoa, Sonora, Mexico
- Died: December 9, 2019 (aged 71); Ciudad Obregón, Sonora, Mexico
- Batted: Right Threw: Right

MLB debut
- September 14, 1971, for the New York Mets

Last MLB appearance
- September 14, 1971, for the New York Mets

MLB statistics
- Batting average: .500
- Home runs: 0
- Runs batted in: 0
- Stats at Baseball Reference

Teams
- New York Mets (1971)

Member of the Mexican Professional

Baseball Hall of Fame
- Induction: 2000

Francisco "Paquín" Estrada Soto (February 12, 1948 – December 9, 2019) was a Mexican Major League Baseball player for the New York Mets. Estrada, a catcher, appeared in one game for the Mets in 1971. Estrada was at the time of his death the manager of the Chihuahua Dorados in the Mexican League (Summer), and catcher's coach with Culiacán Tomateros in the Mexican Pacific League (Winter). In 2006, he served as the manager of the Mexico national baseball team for the World Baseball Classic.

== Career ==
He was acquired by the Tidewater Tides, then the Mets' Triple-A affiliate, from the Diablos Rojos del México for Orlando McFarlane on November 30, 1970.

In the United States, he is probably best known for being part of the trade that sent Nolan Ryan and three others, including Estrada, from the New York Mets to the California Angels for Jim Fregosi. However, he was one of the biggest stars in the history of Mexican baseball. While he played in just one game in the major leagues, Estrada holds the minor league record for games caught (2,847), and played for 26 seasons in the Mexican League, beginning his career there in 1966 and ending it in 1994. In his sole major league appearance, Estrada had one hit in two at-bats, giving him a .500 batting average for his career.

Estrada was also a manager in Mexico from 1983 onward. His teams won three Mexican League championships (the Piratas de Campeche in 1983, the Bravos de León in 1990, and the Piratas again in 2004).

In 1989 Piratas de Campeche retired Estrada's number, 25. This was the franchise's first retired number.

Estrada was elected to the Mexican Professional Baseball Hall of Fame in 2000. In 2013, he was enshrined in the Caribbean Baseball Hall of Fame for his notable contribution as player and manager in 13 Caribbean Series.

On 25 July 2024, the Bravos de León retired Estrada's number 25, the first retired number in the history of the franchise.

In February 2025, Estrada was selected by a committee of journalists as the catcher for the Mexican League Centennial All-Time Team on the occasion of the league's hundredth anniversary.
