= Tomateros de Culiacán =

Logo	Cap insignia

Information
- League: Mexican Pacific League
- Location: Culiacán, Sinaloa
- Ballpark: Estadio Tomateros (2015–present)
- Founded: 1965
- Nickname: Guindas
- Caribbean Series championships: 2 (1996, 2002)
- League championships: 13 (1966–67, 1969–70, 1977–78, 1982–83, 1984–85, 1995–96, 1996–97, 2001–02, 2003–04, 2014–15, 2017–18, 2019–20, 2020–21)
- Colors: Maroon and white
- Mascot: Pollo Tomás, Tommy Tomate
- Ownership: Héctor, Diego y Marcos Ley López
- General manager: Mario Valdez
- Manager: Lorenzo Bundy
- Website: www.tomateros.com.mx

Current uniforms
Local	Away

Tomateros de Culiacán (English: Culiacán Tomato Growers) are a professional baseball team in the Mexican Pacific League based in Culiacán, Sinaloa. The Tomateros have won thirteen league championships and two Caribbean Series in 1996 and 2002. The team was founded in 1965 as part of the Sonora-Sinaloa League.

== History ==
Professional baseball in Culiacán dates back to 1945, when the first team was created the Tacuarineros. This club played in the now-defunct Liga de la Costa del Pacífico (Pacific Coast League). Tomateros de Culiacán was founded in 1965 and started playing in the Liga de la Costa (Coastal League), this league is also now defunct.

The Tomateros won their most recent championship on January, 30th 2021(2020-21 season). They defeated the Naranjeros de Hermosillo in seven games, bringing their total to 13 championships. It also marked the second time in their history that they won consecutive titles.

=== 2001–2002 season ===
The 2001–2002 season was a gold year not only for the Tomateros, but also for México, as they won the 2002 Caribbean Series held at Caracas, Venezuela with big leaguers as Rodrigo López, Oliver Perez, Luis Ayala, José Silva and Benji Gil, as well as with Adán Amezcua, who earned Series MVP honors.

== Honours ==
=== Mexican Pacific League championships ===
The Tomateros have won 13 Mexican Pacific League Championships. Their most recent one came in the 2020–21 season, when they defeated the Naranjeros de Hermosillo in seven games under manager Benji Gil.

Season	Manager	Opponent	Series score	Record
1966–67	Vinicio García	(Note: The champion was the team placed first in the standings at the end of the season.)		55–33–1
1969–70	Vinicio García	Cañeros de Los Mochis	4–2	36–27–1
1977–78	Raúl Cano	Cañeros de Los Mochis	4–2	42–31–1
1982–83	Francisco Estrada	Naranjeros de Hermosillo	4–2	37–33–1
1984–85	Francisco Estrada	Águilas de Mexicali	4–3	37–34–1
1995–96	Francisco Estrada	Venados de Mazatlán	4–1	29–27–2
1996–97	Francisco Estrada	Naranjeros de Hermosillo	4–2	38–24
2001–02	Francisco Estrada	Venados de Mazatlán	4–2	41–27
2003–04	Francisco Estrada	Yaquis de Ciudad Obregón	4–1	38–30
2014–15	Benji Gil	Charros de Jalisco	4–1	38–30
2017–18	Benji Gil	Mayos de Navojoa	4–3	39–29
2019–20	Benji Gil	Venados de Mazatlán	4–3	37–29
2020–21	Benji Gil	Naranjeros de Hermosillo	4–3	29–29

=== Caribbean Series championships ===
The Tomateros have won the Caribbean Series twice in 1996 and 2002, both under Francisco Estrada.

Year	Manager	Record
(Dominican Republic) 1996	Francisco Estrada	5–1
(Venezuela) 2002	Francisco Estrada	5–1

== Roster ==
Tomateros de Culiacán roster
Active roster		Coaches
Pitchers: 50 (Mexico) Manny Barreda; 43 (Mexico) Cristian Castillo; 85 (Mexico) Luis Cessa; 29 (United States) Finn Del Bonta-Smith; 81 (Mexico) Victor González; 89 (United States) Anthony Gose; 52 (Mexico) David Gutiérrez; 23 (Mexico) Francisco Haro; 19 (United States) Clay Helvey; 45 (United States) Brian McKenna; 37 (Mexico) Aldo Montes; 68 (Mexico) Fernando Olguín; 61 (Mexico) Axel Sauceda; 79 (Mexico) Sasagi Sánchez; 56 (Mexico) Miguel Vázquez	Catchers: 39 (Mexico) Fernando Flores; 26 (Mexico) Ildelfonso Ruiz; 44 (Mexico) Alí Solís; Infielders: 3 (Cuba) Diosbel Arias; 57 (Mexico) Ichiro Cano; 71 (Mexico) Sebastián García; 64 (Mexico) Jesús Higuera; 90 (Mexico) Luis Juárez; 32 (Mexico) Joey Meneses; 8 (Mexico) Ramón Ríos; 12 (Mexico) Luis Verdugo; Outfielders: 55 (Cuba) J. P. Martínez; 10 (Cuba) Orlando Martínez; 51 (Mexico) Edgar Robles; 6 (United States) Dwight Smith; 88 (Mexico) Fernando Villegas	Manager: -- (Mexico) Roberto Vizcarra; Coaches: -- (Puerto Rico) Robinson Cancel (hitting); -- (Mexico) José Ángel Chávez (bench); 46 (Mexico) Martín Enríquez (pitching); -- (Mexico) Luis Carlos Martínez (third base); -- (Mexico) Daniel Rodríguez (bullpen); -- (Mexico) Miguel Torrero (first base); Roster updated on 22 December 2025

== Notable players ==
- Adán Amezcua
- Luis Ayala
- Salomé Barojas
- Rigo Beltrán
- Marlon Byrd
- Luis Cruz
- Francisco Estrada
- Eric Farris
- Karim García
- Benji Gil
- Gorkys Hernández
- Esteban Loaiza
- Aurelio López
- Rodrigo López
- Joey Meneses
- Sid Monge
- Art Pennington
- Óliver Pérez
- Dennys Reyes
- Vicente Romo
- Ricardo Rincón
- Darrell Sherman
- José Silva
