= Caribbean Series Most Valuable Player =

The Caribbean Series Most Valuable Player is an annual award, given to one outstanding player in the Caribbean Series. Since 1949, it has been awarded by journalists of the countries participating in the tournament.

== Award winners ==
Year	Player	Position	Country	Team
1949	(Cuba) Agapito Mayor	P	Cuba	Alacranes del Almendares
1950	(United States) Joe Tuminelli	3B	Panama	Carta Vieja Yankees
1951	(Puerto Rico) Luis Olmo	OF	Puerto Rico	Cangrejeros de Santurce
1952	(United States) Tommy Fine	P	Cuba	Leones de la Habana
1953	(United States) Willard Brown	OF	Puerto Rico	Cangrejeros de Santurce
1954	(United States) Jim Rivera	OF	Puerto Rico	Criollos de Caguas
1955	(United States) Don Zimmer	SS	Puerto Rico	Cangrejeros de Santurce
1956	(Cuba) Ray Noble	C	Cuba	Elefantes de Cienfuegos
1957	(United States) Solly Drake	OF	Cuba	Tigres de Marianao
1958	(United States) Earl Battey	C	Venezuela	Industriales de Valencia
1959	(United States) Norm Cash	1B	Venezuela	Indios de Oriente
1960	(United States) Tommy Davis	OF	Puerto Rico	Criollos de Caguas
1970	(Venezuela) Gonzalo Márquez	1B	Venezuela	Navegantes del Magallanes
1971	(Dominican Republic) Manny Mota	OF	Dominican Republic	Tigres del Licey
1972	(Puerto Rico) Carlos May	OF	Puerto Rico	Leones de Ponce
1973	(United States) Bobby Valentine	SS	Dominican Republic	Tigres del Licey
1974	(Mexico) Héctor Espino	1B	Mexico	Yaquis de Obregón
1975	(Puerto Rico) Willie Montañez	1B	Puerto Rico	Vaqueros de Bayamón
1976	(Mexico) Héctor Espino	1B	Mexico	Naranjeros de Hermosillo
1977	(Dominican Republic) Rico Carty	OF	Dominican Republic	Tigres del Licey
1978	(United States) Leon Roberts	OF	Venezuela	Leones del Caracas
1979	(United States) Mitchell Page	OF	Venezuela	Navegantes del Magallanes
1980	(United States) Rudy Law	OF	Dominican Republic	Tigres del Licey
1982	(Venezuela) Baudilio Díaz	C	Venezuela	Leones del Caracas
1983	(United States) Glen Walker	OF	Puerto Rico	Lobos de Arecibo
1984	(United States) Terry Francona	1B	Venezuela	Águilas del Zulia
1985	(Dominican Republic) José Rijo	P	Dominican Republic	Tigres del Licey
1986	(United States) Randy Ready	3B	Puerto Rico	Indios de Mayagüez
1987	(Puerto Rico) Carmelo Martínez	1B	Puerto Rico	Criollos de Caguas
1988	(Dominican Republic) Rufino Linares	OF	Dominican Republic	Leones del Escogido
1989	(United States) Phil Stephenson	1B	Venezuela	Águilas del Zulia
1990	(Dominican Republic) Gerónimo Berroa	OF	Dominican Republic	Leones del Escogido
1991	(Dominican Republic) Gerónimo Berroa (2)	OF	Dominican Republic	Tigres del Licey
1992	(United States) Chad Kreuter	C	Puerto Rico	Indios de Mayagüez
1993	(Puerto Rico) Héctor Villanueva	1B	Puerto Rico	Cangrejeros de Santurce
1994	(United States) Jim Bowie	1B	Dominican Republic	Tigres del Licey
1995	(Puerto Rico) Roberto Alomar	2B	Puerto Rico	Senadores de San Juan
1996	(United States) Darryl Brinkley	OF	Mexico	Tomateros de Culiacán
1997	(United States) Matt Stark	DH	Mexico	Tomateros de Culiacán
1998	(Dominican Republic) Neifi Pérez	SS	Dominican Republic	Águilas Cibaeñas
1999	(Dominican Republic) Neifi Pérez (2)	SS	Dominican Republic	Tigres del Licey
2000	(Puerto Rico) José Cruz Jr.	OF	Puerto Rico	Cangrejeros de Santurce
2001	(Mexico) Erubiel Durazo	1B	Mexico	Naranjeros de Hermosillo
2002	(Mexico) Adán Amezcua	C	Mexico	Tomateros de Culiacán
2003	(Dominican Republic) David Ortiz	1B	Dominican Republic	Águilas Cibaeñas
2004	(Dominican Republic) Francis Beltrán	P	Dominican Republic	Tigres del Licey
2005	(Mexico) Francisco Campos	P	Mexico	Venados de Mazatlán
2006	(Venezuela) Ramón Hernández	1B	Venezuela	Leones del Caracas
2007	(Dominican Republic) Tony Batista	3B	Dominican Republic	Águilas Cibaeñas
2008	(Dominican Republic) Ramón Ortiz	P	Dominican Republic	Tigres del Licey
2009	(Venezuela) Francisco Buttó	P	Venezuela	Tigres de Aragua
2010	(Dominican Republic) Fernando Martínez	OF	Dominican Republic	Leones del Escogido
2011	(Mexico) Jorge Vázquez	1B	Mexico	Yaquis de Obregón
2012	(Dominican Republic) Jairo Asencio	P	Dominican Republic	Leones del Escogido
2013	(Mexico) Luis Mendoza	P	Mexico	Yaquis de Obregón
2014	(Mexico) Chris Roberson	OF	Mexico	Naranjeros de Hermosillo
2015	(Cuba) Frederich Cepeda	DH	Cuba	Vegueros de Pinar del Río
2016	(Venezuela) José Martinez	OF	Venezuela	Tigres de Aragua
2017	(Puerto Rico) David Vidal	IF	Puerto Rico	Criollos de Caguas
2018	(Puerto Rico) Anthony García	OF	Puerto Rico	Criollos de Caguas
2019	(Panama) Javy Guerra	SS	Panama	Toros de Herrera
2020	(United States) Peter O'Brien	1B	Dominican Republic	Toros del Este
2021	(Dominican Republic) Juan Lagares	CF	Dominican Republic	Águilas Cibaeñas
2022	(Colombia) Reynaldo Rodríguez	1B	Colombia	Caimanes de Barranquilla
2023	(Dominican Republic) César Valdez	P	Dominican Republic	Tigres del Licey
2024	(Venezuela) Ricardo Pinto	P	Venezuela	Tiburones de La Guaira
2025	(Dominican Republic) Esmil Rogers	P	Dominican Republic	Leones del Escogido
2026	(United States) Michael Wielansky	2B	Mexico	Charros de Jalisco

== See also ==
- Baseball Awards
- Caribbean Baseball Hall of Fame

== Sources ==
- Beisbol About
- Major League Baseball
- Nuñez, José Antero (1994). Serie del Caribe de la Habana a Puerto La Cruz. JAN Editor. ISBN 980-07-2389-7
