= Caribbean Series =

Annual baseball tournament

- Sport: Baseball
- First season: 1949; 77 years ago
- Director: Juan Francisco Puello Herrera
- Organizing body: Caribbean Professional Baseball Confederation (CPBC)
- Countries: Dominican Republic; Mexico; Puerto Rico; Venezuela
- Region: Caribbean and Latin America
- Most recent champion: (Mexico) Charros de Jalisco (1st title)
- Most titles: (Dominican Republic) Tigres del Licey (11 titles)
- Broadcasters: United States: ESPN Deportes (Spanish); MLB Network (English)
- Related competitions: See Participants
- Website: www.seriedelcaribe.net/en
- 2027 Caribbean Series

The Caribbean Series (Spanish: Serie del Caribe) is an annual club tournament contested by professional baseball teams in Latin America. It is organized by the Caribbean Professional Baseball Confederation (CPBC). The series is normally played in February, after the various winter leagues have ended their national tournaments.

The Dominican Republic has won the most Caribbean Series championships (23), with Tigres del Licey being the most successful team in the tournament's history. The series has been won by 29 teams from seven countries. Only two teams have won the tournament two consecutive years, the most recent being Criollos de Caguas from Puerto Rico in 2017 and 2018.

== History ==
The competition was the brainchild of Venezuelan baseball entrepreneur Pablo Morales and Oscar Prieto Ortiz, who devised the idea after seeing the success of the Serie Interamericana in 1946, which featured the clubs Brooklyn Bushwicks from the United States, Cervecería Caracas from Venezuela, Sultanes de Monterrey from Mexico, and an All-Star team composed of Cuban players.

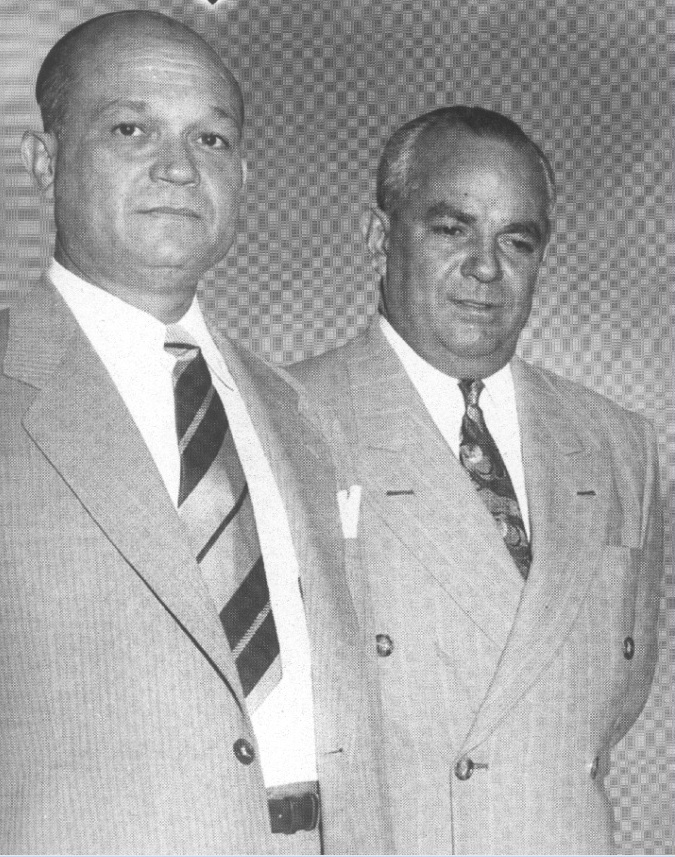
Pablo Morales and Oscar Prieto founded the Caribbean Series

Inspired by the Interamerican Series and his experience as a former president of the International Baseball Federation, Morales joined Prieto and presented the idea to baseball representatives of Cuba, Panama, and Puerto Rico during a meeting held in Havana on August 21, 1948. The representatives then agreed to stage a four-country, round-robin tournament 12-game to be known as the Serie del Caribe, to be launched in Cuba from February 20–25 of 1949.

The Series ran annually from 1949 through 1960, with Cuba winning seven times. However, the event was suspended in 1961, as a result of the Cuban Revolution. Fidel Castro dissolved all professional baseball in Cuba, and MLB Commissioner Ford Frick ruled that American major leaguers were barred from playing in Havana, where the 1961 series had been scheduled.

It was not until 1970 that the Caribbean Series was revived. Moreover, the 1981 Caribbean Series was not held due to a Venezuelan League player's strike.

The tournament featured the champions of the Dominican Republic, Mexico, Puerto Rico, and Venezuela for over 40 years. Cuba returned in 2014. Panama returned to host the 2019 edition. Colombia was added for the 2020 edition, replacing Cuba who could not participate due to visa issues. Curaçao was invited as a guest in 2023.

== Participants ==
=== Permanent members ===
Key

- Member of the Caribbean Professional Baseball Confederation

Country	League	First edition
Dominican Republic	Dominican Professional Baseball League	1970
Mexico	Mexican Pacific League	1971
Puerto Rico	Roberto Clemente Professional Baseball League	1949
Venezuela	Venezuelan Professional Baseball League^{[b]}	1949

=== Other participants ===
Country	League	First edition	Latest edition
Cuba	Cuban League	1949	1960
Cuba	Cuban National Series	2014	2019
Cuba	Cuban Elite League	2023	
Curaçao	Curaçao Professional Baseball League	2023	2024
Colombia	Colombian Professional Baseball League	2020	2023
Nicaragua	Nicaraguan Professional Baseball League	2024	2024
Panama	Panamanian Professional Baseball League^{[a]}	1949	2026
Japan	Japan Breeze	2025	

=== Notes ===
- ^{a} After the 1960 tournament, Panama would not appear in another Caribbean Series until 2019.
- ^{b} Venezuela's LVBP was replaced by the Liga Occidental de Béisbol Profesional for the 1960 tournament

== Series ==
- From 1949 to 2012 the winner was determined by win-loss record.
- In 2013 the winner was determined by championship game between the two teams with the best records.
- Since 2014 the winner has been determined by knockout round between the four teams with the best records.

Year	Champion	Manager	Record	Finals Score	Runners-up	Location
1949	(Cuba) Alacranes del Almendares	Fermin Guerra	6–0	—	(Venezuela) Cerveceria Caracas	(Cuba) Havana
1950	(Panama) Carta Vieja Yankees	Wayne Blackburn	5–1	—	(Puerto Rico) Criollos de Caguas	(Puerto Rico) San Juan
1951	(Puerto Rico) Cangrejeros de Santurce	George Scales	5–1	—	(Cuba) Leones del Habana	(Venezuela) Caracas
1952	(Cuba) Leones del Habana	Mike González	5–0	—	(Panama) Carta Vieja Yankees	Panama City
1953	(Puerto Rico) Cangrejeros de Santurce (2)	Buster Clarkson	5–0	—	(Cuba) Leones del Habana	(Cuba) Havana
1954	(Puerto Rico) Criollos de Caguas	Mickey Owen	4–2	—	(Cuba) Alacranes del Almendares	(Puerto Rico) San Juan
1955	(Puerto Rico) Cangrejeros de Santurce (3)	Herman Franks	5–1	—	(Venezuela) Navegantes del Magallanes	(Venezuela) Caracas
1956	(Cuba) Elefantes de Cienfuegos	Oscar Rodríguez	5–1	—	(Panama) Chesterfield Smokers	(Venezuela) Caracas
1957	(Cuba) Tigres de Marianao	Napoleón Reyes	5–1	—	(Panama) Cerveza Balboa	(Cuba) Havana
1958	(Cuba) Tigres de Marianao (2)	Napoleón Reyes (2)	4–2	—	(Puerto Rico) Criollos de Caguas	(Puerto Rico) San Juan
1959	(Cuba) Alacranes del Almendares (2)	Clemente Carreras	5–1	—	(Venezuela) Indios de Oriente	(Venezuela) Caracas
1960	(Cuba) Elefantes de Cienfuegos (2)	Tony Castaño	6–0	—	(Panama) Marlboro Smokers	Panama City
Not held from 1961–1969; see Interamerican Series
1970	(Venezuela) Navegantes del Magallanes	Carlos Pascual	7–1	—	(Puerto Rico) Leones de Ponce	(Venezuela) Caracas
1971	(Dominican Republic) Tigres del Licey	Manny Mota	6–0	—	Tied (Note: Mexico's Naranjeros de Hermosillo, Puerto Rico's Cangrejeros de Santurce, and Venezuela's Tiburones de La Guaira all tied for second place, with a 2-4 record.)	(Puerto Rico) San Juan
1972	(Puerto Rico) Leones de Ponce	Frank Verdi	5–1	—	Tied (Note: The Dominican Republic's Águilas Cibaeñas and Venezuela's Tigres de Aragua tied for second place, with a 3-3 record.)	(Dominican Republic) Santo Domingo
1973	(Dominican Republic) Tigres del Licey (2)	Tommy Lasorda	5–1	—	Tied (Note: Puerto Rico's Cangrejeros de Santurce and Venezuela's Leones del Caracas tied for second place, with a 3-3 record.)	(Venezuela) Caracas
1974	(Puerto Rico) Criollos de Caguas (2)	Bobby Wine	4–2	—	Tied (Note: The Dominican Republic's Tigres del Licey and Mexico's Venados de Mazatlán tied for second place, with a 3-3 record.)	(Mexico) Hermosillo
1975	(Puerto Rico) Vaqueros de Bayamón	José Pagán	5–1	—	Tied (Note: The Dominican Republic's Águilas Cibaeñas and Mexico's Naranjeros de Hermosillo tied for second place, with a 3-3 record.)	(Puerto Rico) San Juan
1976	(Mexico) Naranjeros de Hermosillo	Cananea Reyes	5–1	—	(Venezuela) Tigres de Aragua	(Dominican Republic) Santo Domingo & Santiago
1977	(Dominican Republic) Tigres del Licey (3)	Buck Rodgers	6–0	—	(Venezuela) Navegantes del Magallanes	(Venezuela) Caracas
1978	(Puerto Rico) Indios de Mayagüez	Rene Lachemann	5–1	—	Tied (Note: The Dominican Republic's Águilas Cibaeñas and Venezuela's Leones del Caracas tied for second place, with a 3-3 record.)	(Mexico) Mazatlán
1979	(Venezuela) Navegantes del Magallanes (2)	Willie Horton	5–1	—	(Dominican Republic) Águilas Cibaeñas	(Puerto Rico) San Juan
1980	(Dominican Republic) Tigres del Licey (4)	Del Crandall	4–2	—	Tied (Note: Puerto Rico's Vaqueros de Bayamón and Venezuela's Leones del Caracas tied for second place, with a 3-3 record.)	(Dominican Republic) Santo Domingo
1981	Not held					
1982	(Venezuela) Leones del Caracas	Chico Carrasquel	5–1	—	(Puerto Rico) Leones de Ponce	(Mexico) Hermosillo
1983	(Puerto Rico) Lobos de Arecibo	Ron Clark	5–1	—	(Venezuela) Tiburones de La Guaira	(Venezuela) Caracas
1984	(Venezuela) Águilas del Zulia	Rubén Amaro	5–1	—	(Mexico) Cañeros de Los Mochis	(Puerto Rico) San Juan
1985	(Dominican Republic) Tigres del Licey (5)	Terry Collins	5–1	—	(Mexico) Tomateros de Culiacán	(Mexico) Mazatlán
1986	(Mexico) Águilas de Mexicali (2)	Cananea Reyes	4–2	—	Tied (Note: The Dominican Republic's Águilas Cibaeñas and Venezuela's Tiburones de La Guaira tied for second place, with a 3-3 record.)	(Venezuela) Maracaibo
1987	(Puerto Rico) Criollos de Caguas (3)	Ramón Avilés	5–2	—	(Dominican Republic) Águilas Cibaeñas	(Mexico) Hermosillo
1988	(Dominican Republic) Leones del Escogido	Phil Regan	4–2	—	Tied (Note: Puerto Rico's Indios de Mayagüez and Mexico's Potros de Tijuana tied for second place, with a 3-3 record.)	(Dominican Republic) Santo Domingo
1989	(Venezuela) Águilas del Zulia (2)	Pete Mackanin	5–1	—	(Puerto Rico) Indios de Mayagüez	(Mexico) Mazatlán
1990	(Dominican Republic) Leones del Escogido (2)	Felipe Alou	5–1	—	Tied (Note: Puerto Rico's Senadores de San Juan and Venezuela's Leones del Caracas tied for second place, with a 3-3 record.)	(United States) Miami
1991	(Dominican Republic) Tigres del Licey (6)	John Roseboro	5–0	—	(Venezuela) Cardenales de Lara	(United States) Miami
1992	(Puerto Rico) Indios de Mayagüez (2)	Pat Kelly	5–1	—	(Venezuela) Águilas del Zulia	(Mexico) Hermosillo
1993	(Puerto Rico) Cangrejeros de Santurce (4)	Mako Oliveras	5–2	—	(Dominican Republic) Águilas Cibaeñas	(Mexico) Mazatlán
1994	(Dominican Republic) Tigres del Licey (7)	Casey Parsons	5–1	—	(Venezuela) Navegantes del Magallanes	(Venezuela) Puerto la Cruz
1995	(Puerto Rico) Senadores de San Juan	Luis Meléndez	6–0	—	(Dominican Republic) Azucareros del Este	(Puerto Rico) San Juan
1996	(Mexico) Tomateros de Culiacán	Francisco Estrada	5–1	—	(Puerto Rico) Lobos de Arecibo	(Dominican Republic) Santo Domingo
1997	(Dominican Republic) Águilas Cibaeñas	Mike Quade	4–2	—	Tied (Note: Mexico's Tomateros de Culiacán and Venezuela's Navegantes del Magallanes tied for second place, with a 3-3 record.)	(Mexico) Hermosillo
1998	(Dominican Republic) Águilas Cibaeñas (2)	Tony Peña	6–0	—	(Puerto Rico) Indios de Mayagüez	(Venezuela) Puerto la Cruz
1999	(Dominican Republic) Tigres del Licey (8)	Dave Jauss	5–2	—	(Puerto Rico) Indios de Mayagüez	(Puerto Rico) San Juan
2000	(Puerto Rico) Cangrejeros de Santurce (5)	Mako Oliveras (2)	6–0	—	(Dominican Republic) Águilas Cibaeñas	(Dominican Republic) Santo Domingo
2001	(Dominican Republic) Águilas Cibaeñas (3)	Félix Fermín	4–2	—	Tied (Note: Venezuela's Cardenales de Lara and Mexico's Naranjeros de Hermosillo tied for second place, with a 3-3 record.)	(Mexico) Culiacán
2002	(Mexico) Tomateros de Culiacán (2)	Francisco Estrada (2)	5–1	—	Tied (Note: Puerto Rico's Vaqueros de Bayamón and the Dominican Republic's Tigres del Licey tied for second place, with a 3-3 record.)	(Venezuela) Caracas
2003	(Dominican Republic) Águilas Cibaeñas (4)	Félix Fermín (2)	6–1	—	(Puerto Rico) Indios de Mayagüez	(Puerto Rico) Carolina
2004	(Dominican Republic) Tigres del Licey (9)	Manny Acta	5–1	—	(Mexico) Tomateros de Culiacán	(Dominican Republic) Santo Domingo
2005	(Mexico) Venados de Mazatlán	Juan José Pacho	5–1	—	Tied (Note: The Dominican Republic's Águilas Cibaeñas and Venezuela's Tigres de Aragua tied for second place, with a 3-3 record.)	(Mexico) Mazatlán
2006	(Venezuela) Leones del Caracas (2)	Carlos Subero	6–0	—	(Dominican Republic) Tigres del Licey	(Venezuela) Valencia and Maracay
2007	(Dominican Republic) Águilas Cibaeñas (5)	Félix Fermín (3)	5–1	—	(Puerto Rico) Gigantes de Carolina	(Puerto Rico) Carolina
2008	(Dominican Republic) Tigres del Licey (10)	Héctor de la Cruz	5–1	—	(Mexico) Venados de Mazatlán	(Dominican Republic) Santiago
2009	(Venezuela) Tigres de Aragua	Buddy Bailey	5–1	—	(Dominican Republic) Águilas Cibaeñas	(Mexico) Mexicali
2010	(Dominican Republic) Leones del Escogido (3)	Ken Oberkfell	5–1	—	(Puerto Rico) Indios de Mayagüez	(Venezuela) Margarita Island
2011	(Mexico) Yaquis de Obregón	Eddie Díaz	4–2	—	Tied (Note: The Dominican Republic's Toros del Este and Puerto Rico's Criollos de Caguas tied for second place, with a 3-3 record.)	(Puerto Rico) Mayagüez
2012	(Dominican Republic) Leones del Escogido (4)	Ken Oberkfell (2)	4–2	—	Tied (Note: Puerto Rico's Indios de Mayagüez and Venezuela's Tigres de Aragua tied for second place, with a 3-3 record.)	(Dominican Republic) Santo Domingo
2013	(Mexico) Yaquis de Obregón (2)	Eddie Díaz (2)	4–3	4–3 (F/18)	(Dominican Republic) Leones del Escogido	(Mexico) Hermosillo
2014	(Mexico) Naranjeros de Hermosillo (2)	Matías Carrillo	4–2	7–1	(Puerto Rico) Indios de Mayagüez	(Venezuela) Margarita Island
2015	(Cuba) Vegueros de Pinar del Río	Alfonso Urquiola	3–3	3–2	(Mexico) Tomateros de Culiacán	(Puerto Rico) San Juan
2016	(Mexico) Venados de Mazatlan (2)	Juan José Pacho	6–0	5–4	(Venezuela) Tigres de Aragua	(Dominican Republic) Santo Domingo
2017	(Puerto Rico) Criollos de Caguas (4)	Luis Matos	3−3	1–0 (F/10)	(Mexico) Águilas de Mexicali	(Mexico) Culiacán
2018	(Puerto Rico) Criollos de Caguas (5)	Luis Matos (2)	4−2	9–4	(Dominican Republic) Águilas Cibaeñas	(Mexico) Guadalajara
2019	(Panama) Toros de Herrera	Manuel Rodríguez	4−1	3–1	(Cuba) Leñadores de Las Tunas	Panama City
2020	(Dominican Republic) Toros del Este	Lino Rivera	6−1	9–3	(Venezuela) Cardenales de Lara	(Puerto Rico) San Juan
2021	(Dominican Republic) Águilas Cibaeñas (6)	Félix Fermín (4)	7−0	4–1	(Puerto Rico) Criollos de Caguas	(Mexico) Mazatlán
2022	(Colombia) Caimanes de Barranquilla	José Mosquera	5−2	4–1	(Dominican Republic) Gigantes del Cibao	(Dominican Republic) Santo Domingo
2023	(Dominican Republic) Tigres del Licey (11)	Jose Offerman	6−3	3–0	(Venezuela) Leones del Caracas	(Venezuela) Caracas and La Guaira
2024	(Venezuela) Tiburones de La Guaira	Ozzie Guillén	7−1	3–0	(Dominican Republic) Tigres del Licey	(United States) Miami
2025	(Dominican Republic) Leones del Escogido (5)	Albert Pujols	4–2	1–0	(Mexico) Charros de Jalisco	(Mexico) Mexicali
2026	(Mexico) Charros de Jalisco	Benjamin Gil	5-1	12-11 (F/10)	(Mexico) Tomateros de Culiacán	(Mexico) Guadalajara
2027						(Mexico) Hermosillo
2028						(United States) Miami

Starting with the 2013 Caribbean Series, a championship game was introduced where the two teams with the best win–loss record from the round-robin first stage would meet to determine the champion. In 2013 the first round consisted of 12 games and each team faced the other teams twice, one as home club and the other as an away team; from 2014 on, with the return of Cuban teams to the tournament, the first stage was changed to a round robin of 10 games where each team faced the other teams once.

== Championships by team ==
Rank	Team	Wins	Years
1	(Dominican Republic) Tigres del Licey	11	1971, 1973, 1977, 1980, 1985, 1991, 1994, 1999, 2004, 2008, 2023
2	(Dominican Republic) Águilas Cibaeñas	6	1997, 1998, 2001, 2003, 2007, 2021
3	(Puerto Rico) Cangrejeros de Santurce	5	1951, 1953, 1955, 1993, 2000
3	(Puerto Rico) Criollos de Caguas	5	1954, 1974, 1987, 2017, 2018
3	(Dominican Republic) Leones del Escogido	5	1988, 1990, 2010, 2012, 2025
4	(Cuba) Tigres de Marianao	2	1957, 1958
4	(Cuba) Alacranes del Almendares	2	1949, 1959
4	(Cuba) Elefantes de Cienfuegos	2	1956, 1960
4	(Venezuela) Navegantes del Magallanes	2	1970, 1979
4	(Venezuela) Águilas del Zulia	2	1984, 1989
4	(Puerto Rico) Indios de Mayagüez	2	1978, 1992
4	(Mexico) Tomateros de Culiacán	2	1996, 2002
4	(Venezuela) Leones del Caracas	2	1982, 2006
4	(Mexico) Yaquis de Obregón	2	2011, 2013
4	(Mexico) Naranjeros de Hermosillo	2	1976, 2014
4	(Mexico) Venados de Mazatlán	2	2005, 2016
5	(Panama) Carta Vieja Yankees	1	1950
5	(Cuba) Leones del Habana	1	1952
5	(Puerto Rico) Leones de Ponce	1	1972
5	(Puerto Rico) Vaqueros de Bayamón	1	1975
5	(Puerto Rico) Lobos de Arecibo	1	1983
5	(Mexico) Águilas de Mexicali	1	1986
5	(Puerto Rico) Senadores de San Juan	1	1995
5	(Venezuela) Tigres de Aragua	1	2009
5	(Cuba) Vegueros de Pinar del Río	1	2015
5	(Panama) Toros de Herrera	1	2019
5	(Dominican Republic) Toros del Este	1	2020
5	(Colombia) Caimanes de Barranquilla	1	2022
5	(Venezuela) Tiburones de La Guaira	1	2024
5	(Mexico) Charros de Jalisco	1	2026

== Championships by country ==
Rank	Country	Wins	Years
1	Dominican Republic	23	1971, 1973, 1977, 1980, 1985, 1988, 1990, 1991, 1994, 1997, 1998, 1999, 2001, 2003, 2004, 2007, 2008, 2010, 2012, 2020, 2021, 2023, 2025
2	Puerto Rico	16	1951, 1953, 1954, 1955, 1972, 1974, 1975, 1978, 1983, 1987, 1992, 1993, 1995, 2000, 2017, 2018
3	Mexico	10	1976, 1986, 1996, 2002, 2005, 2011, 2013, 2014, 2016, 2026
4	Cuba	8	1949, 1952, 1956, 1957, 1958, 1959, 1960, 2015
4	Venezuela	8	1970, 1979, 1982, 1984, 1989, 2006, 2009, 2024
6	Panama	2	1950, 2019
7	Colombia	1	2022

== Undefeated teams ==
No.	Team	Record	Years
3	(Dominican Republic) Tigres del Licey	6–0; 6–0; 5–0	1971; 1977; 1991
2	(Puerto Rico) Cangrejeros de Santurce	6–0; 6–0	1953; 2000
2	(Dominican Republic) Águilas Cibaeñas	6–0; 7–0	1998; 2021
1	(Cuba) Alacranes del Almendares	6–0	1949
1	(Cuba) Leones del Habana	5–0	1952
1	(Cuba) Elefantes de Cienfuegos	6–0	1960
1	(Puerto Rico) Senadores de San Juan	6–0	1995
1	(Venezuela) Leones del Caracas	6–0	2006
1	(Mexico) Venados de Mazatlán	6–0	2016

== See also ==
- List of baseball players who have played in the Caribbean Series
- Caribbean Baseball Hall of Fame
- Caribbean Series MVPs
- Serie de las Américas
- Baseball Champions League Americas
- Latin American Series
- Interamerican Series
- Asia Series
- European Cup
- Caribbean Series Awards

== Sources ==
- Antero Núñez, José. Series del Caribe. Jefferson, Caracas, Venezuela: Impresos Urbina, C.A., 1987.
- Gutiérrez, Daniel. Enciclopedia del Béisbol en Venezuela – 1895–2006. Caracas, Venezuela: Impresión Arte, C.A., 2007.
