= 2026 Caribbean Series =

2026 baseball tournament

Tournament details
- Country: Mexico
- City: Zapopan
- Venue: Estadio Panamericano de Béisbol
- Dates: 1 – 7 February 2026
- Teams: 5

Final positions
- Champions: (Mexico) Charros de Jalisco (1st title)
- Runners-up: (Mexico) Tomateros de Culiacán

Tournament statistics
- Games played: 13
- Attendance: 90,415 (6,955 per game)

Awards
- MVP: (United States) Michael Wielansky (Charros de Jalisco)

The 2026 Caribbean Series was the 68th edition of the Caribbean Series club baseball tournament, scheduled from 1 to 7 February 2026, at the Estadio Panamericano de Béisbol in Zapopan, Jalisco, Mexico.

The tournament features the winners of the respective winter league baseball leagues of the Caribbean Professional Baseball Confederation (CPBC) four full members; Dominican Republic (LIDOM), Mexico (LMP), Puerto Rico (LBPRC), and Venezuela (LVBP), plus special guest Panama (LPBP).

The tournament was originally scheduled to be held in Venezuela; however, Puerto Rico, Dominican Republic, and Mexico requested after meeting on 15 December 2025, that the CBPC move the tournament from Venezuela due to the ongoing political turmoil in the country. LVBP protested the decision and eventually decided to pull out of the event all together. As a result, their league winner participated in the 2026 Serie de las Américas, played in Venezuela at the same time.

As host and due to Venezuela's departure, Mexico received two spots - the winners (Red) and runners-up (Green) of the 2025–26 Mexican Pacific League season.

Leones del Escogido represented the Dominican Republic as defending champions and were eliminated by the Tomateros de Culiacán in the semi-finals.

In an All-Mexican final, the Charros de Jalisco won their first Caribbean Series title by defeating the Tomateros de Culiacán by a final score of 12–11 in extra innings.

== Tournament format ==
A single round-robin format; each team faces each other once. The four teams with the best records advance to the semi-finals (1st vs. 4th and 2nd vs. 3rd). The two winners will play in the final to decide the tournament champion.

== Summary ==
On 4 February, the game between the Federales de Chiriquí against the Leones del Escogido saw a scoreline of 15–16 in favor of the Leones for a single game record of 31 combined runs. This is the most combined runs scored at the Caribbean Series since the 28 combined runs scored on 6 February 1990, when the Naranjeros de Hermosillo defeated the Senadores de San Juan 20–8 in Miami, Florida.

In the Final, host Charros de Jalisco led the Tomateros de Culiacán by a score of 9–1 after four innings. Culiacán came alive with a six run frame in the top of the fifth to make the game closer at 9–7. After trading runs in the seventh, with one out and one on, Victor Martinez launched a game-tying two-run home run, his second homer of the game. The game would go into extra innings tied at ten. In the top of the 10th, Alí Solís’ sacrifice fly gave the Tomateros their first lead of the night at 11–10. In the bottom of the 10th, Jalisco managed to load the bases with two out, then Tomateros closer Lupe Chávez threw a wild pitch that would tie the game at 11. With a base open, Mateo Gil was walked to load the bases again and against the next hitter, Bligh Madris, Chávez launched another wild pitch which would drive in Michael Wielansky for the winning run.

== Participating teams ==
Country	Team	Manager	Means of qualification	Caribbean Series Titles
Dominican Republic	Leones del Escogido	(Dominican Republic) Ramón Santiago	Winners of the Dominican Professional Baseball League (2025–26 LIDOM)	5 (1988, 1990, 2010, 2012, 2025)
Mexico (Red)	Charros de Jalisco	(Mexico) Benji Gil	Winners of the Mexican Pacific League (2025–26 LMP)	0
Mexico (Green)	Tomateros de Culiacán	(United States) Lorenzo Bundy	Runners-up of the Mexican Pacific League (2025–26 LMP)	2 (1996, 2002)
Panama	Federales de Chiriquí	(Panama) José Mayorga	Winners of the Panamanian Professional Baseball League (2023–24 LPBP)	0
Puerto Rico	Cangrejeros de Santurce	(Venezuela) Omar López	Winners of the Roberto Clemente Professional Baseball League (2025–26 LBPRC)	5 (1951, 1953, 1955, 1993, 2000)

== Round Robin ==
=== Standings ===
As of 5 February 2026

Team	GP	W	L	PCT.	GB	RS	RA	DIFF.	Qualification
(Dominican Republic) Leones del Escogido	4	3	1	.750	–	33	32	+1	Qualified to Semi-finals
(Mexico) Charros de Jalisco (H)	4	3	1	.750	–	22	11	+11	Qualified to Semi-finals
(Puerto Rico) Cangrejeros de Santurce	4	2	2	.500	1	16	15	+1	Qualified to Semi-finals
(Mexico) Tomateros de Culiacán	4	2	2	.500	1	18	17	+1	Qualified to Semi-finals
(Panama) Federales de Chiriquí	4	0	4	.000	3	23	37	-14	

(H) Host

=== Schedule ===
Time zone: Jalisco (UTC−06:00)

Game	Date	Time	Away	Result	Home	Stadium	Attendance
1	1 February	13:00	Tomateros de Culiacán (Mexico)	4–5	(Puerto Rico) Cangrejeros de Santurce	Estadio; Panamericano de Béisbol	8,744
2	1 February	19:30	Leones del Escogido (Dominican Republic)	5–4	(Mexico) Charros de Jalisco	Estadio; Panamericano de Béisbol	8,835
3	2 February	14:00	Cangrejeros de Santurce (Puerto Rico)	3–5	(Dominican Republic) Leones del Escogido	Estadio; Panamericano de Béisbol	4,568
4	2 February	19:00	Charros de Jalisco (Mexico)	11–4	(Panama) Federales de Chiriquí	Estadio; Panamericano de Béisbol	6,939
5	3 February	14:00	Federales de Chiriquí (Panama)	1–2	(Mexico) Tomateros de Culiacán	Estadio; Panamericano de Béisbol	4,106
6	3 February	19:00	Charros de Jalisco (Mexico)	3–0	(Puerto Rico) Cangrejeros de Santurce	Estadio; Panamericano de Béisbol	7,779
7	4 February	14:00	Federales de Chiriquí (Panama)	15–16	(Dominican Republic) Leones del Escogido	Estadio; Panamericano de Béisbol	3,595
8	4 February	19:00	Tomateros de Culiacán (Mexico)	2–4	(Mexico) Charros de Jalisco	Estadio; Panamericano de Béisbol	8,357
9	5 February	14:00	Cangrejeros de Santurce (Puerto Rico)	8–3	(Panama) Federales de Chiriquí	Estadio; Panamericano de Béisbol	3,580
10	5 February	19:00	Leones del Escogido (Dominican Republic)	7–10	(Mexico) Tomateros de Culiacán	Estadio; Panamericano de Béisbol	7,622

== Knockout stage ==
=== Bracket ===
Semi-finals
6 February 2026
4 (Mexico) Tomateros de Culiacán	9
1 (Dominican Republic) Leones del Escogido	4
6 February 2026
3 (Puerto Rico) Cangrejeros de Santurce	6
2 (Mexico) Charros de Jalisco	8

Final
7 February 2026
4 (Mexico) Tomateros de Culiacán	11
2 (Mexico) Charros de Jalisco	12

=== Semi-finals ===
Game	Date	Time	Away	Result	Home	Stadium	Attendance
11	6 February	14:00	Tomateros de Culiacán (Mexico)	9–4	(Dominican Republic) Leones del Escogido	Estadio Panamericano de Béisbol	4,764
12	6 February	19:00	Cangrejeros de Santurce (Puerto Rico)	6–8	(Mexico) Charros de Jalisco	Estadio Panamericano de Béisbol	9,759

=== Final ===
Game 13 – 7 February 2026 19:00 at Estadio Panamericano de Béisbol in Zapopan, Jalisco 81 °F (27 °C), Clear
Team	1	2	3	4	5	6	7	8	9	10	R	H	E
(Mexico) Tomateros de Culiacán	0	0	1	0	6	0	1	0	2	1	11	13	1
(Mexico) Charros de Jalisco	0	3	4	2	0	0	1	0	0	2	12	14	1
WP: Cesar Gomez LP: Guadalupe Chavez Ayala; Home runs: TC: Víctor Mendoza, 2 CJ: Bligh Madris; Attendance: 11,767; Boxscore

== Statistics ==
As of 6 February 2026

Hitting leaders
Stat	Player	Team	Total
AVG	(United States) Michael Wielansky	Charros de Jalisco	.625
HR	(Dominican Republic) Franchy Cordero	Leones del Escogido	3
RBI	Three tied		6
R	Two tied		5
H	(United States) Michael Wielansky	Charros de Jalisco	10
SB	Five tied		5

Pitching leaders
Stat	Player	Team	Total
W	Six tied		1
L	Six tied		1
ERA	Twelve tied		0.00
K	(United States) Andrew Baker	Cangrejeros de Santurce	7
IP	Two tied		6.0
SV	(Dominican Republic) Jimmy Cordero	Leones del Escogido	3

== Broadcasting ==
Country	Broadcaster(s)	Source
Dominican Republic		
Mexico		
Panama		
Puerto Rico	WAPA Deportes	
United States	MLB Network/MLB.tv (English); ESPN Deportes/ESPN+/Disney+ (Spanish)	

== See also ==
- 2026 Serie de las Américas
