= 1991 Caribbean Series =

1991 baseball tournament

The thirty-third edition of the Caribbean Series (Serie del Caribe) was a baseball competition played in 1991. It was held from February 2 through February 9 with the champion teams from the Dominican Republic, Tigres del Licey; Mexico, Potros de Tijuana; Puerto Rico, Cangrejeros de Santurce, and Venezuela, Cardenales de Lara. All games were held at Bobby Maduro Stadium in Miami, Florida.

== Summary ==
The previous year's event had been a huge disappointment, with the poorly-attended games played in the Orange Bowl, a stadium wholly unsuited for baseball. But Series organizers placed the 1991 event in Miami again, this time at the much-better-suited Bobby Maduro Stadium, an actual ballpark. Attendance improved, with 7,742 at the final game in the 11,500-capacity stadium;. This was the last Caribbean Series to be held in American soil until 2024 at the same city.

Unlike previous years, the four teams played a six-game round robin schedule, each team facing the other teams once, followed by a three-game playoff round and a best-of-three series. (The playing format, called Winterball I, was not used again in the Series.)

This time, the Tigres del Licey became the first Dominican Republic club to clinch two Caribbean Series titles with an undefeated record. The Tigres had won its first title in 1971 edition. As a result, Licey is the only team with an undefeated record in three editions of the Series.

Licey, with John Roseboro at the helm, won the Series behind a strong offensive outburst and fine pitching performance, outscoring its rivals 50–8 to set a Series record. In the first round, the Dominican team defeated Puerto Rico 8–2, blanked Mexico 4–0, and crushed Venezuela 12–1. Then, they extended their overwhelming dominance over Venezuela in the final round with scores of 13–4 and 13–1.

Outfielders Gerónimo Berroa (.479 BA) and Jerry Brooks (.473) led the Series hitters and shared MVP honors. Licey also received offensive support from Henry Rodríguez, Andújar Cedeño, Francisco Cabrera, Gilberto Reyes, Juan Bell and Silvestre Campusano. The pitching staff was headed by Mélido Pérez, who posted a 2–0 record and a perfect 0.00 ERA in 12 innings pitched.

Other contributions came from Juan Guzmán (1–0, 2.35 ERA, 7 2/3 IP) and Efraín Valdez (1–0, 0.00 ERA, 6.0 IP), being backed by a bullpen that featured Rod Beck, Jeff Hartsock, Mel Rojas and José Tapia. Also in the roster were Pedro Astacio, Braulio Castillo, Stan Javier and José Rijo.

Each of the remaining teams finished 1–2 in the round-robin part of the tournament, leading to a semi final playoff in which Venezuela beat both Mexico and Puerto Rico once each. The Venezuelan Cardenales de Lara included players as Luis Aponte, Willie Banks, Derek Bell, William Cañate, Giovanni Carrara, Tony Castillo, José Escobar, Tobias Hernández, Alexis Infante, Randy Knorr, Robert Pérez, Luis Sojo, Mike Timlin and Mark Whiten.

The Mexican Potros de Tijuana recorded their lone win against Venezuela during the round-robin with a 10-hit, 3–0 shutout, on a combined pitching effort. Their roster included Matías Carrillo, Vinny Castilla, Tommy Hinzo, José Tolentino and Ray Torres, among others.

Puerto Rico's Cangrejeros de Santurce disappointed, even though they fielded an impressive squad which included Eric Anthony, Luis Aquino, Kevin Brown, Jacob Brumfield, Casey Candaele, Mike Cubbage, Carlos Delgado, Tony Fossas, Leo Gómez, Mark Lemke, Jaime Navarro, Andy Tomberlin and David West. The Cangrejeros defeated Tijuana, 6–1, for their only victory in the tournament.

== Final standings ==
Country	Club	W	L	W/L %	Managers
Dominican Republic	Tigres del Licey	5	0	1.000	John Roseboro
Venezuela	Cardenales de Lara	3	4	.429	Domingo Carrasquel
Mexico	Potros de Tijuana	1	3	.250	Joel Serna
Puerto Rico	Cangrejeros de Santurce	1	3	.250	Mako Oliveras

Round-robin
Tigres del Licey	3–0
Cardenales de Lara	1–2
Cangrejeros de Santurce	1–2
Potros de Tijuana	1–2

Semifinals
Cardenales de Lara	2–0
Cangrejeros de Santurce	1–1
Potros de Tijuana	1–1

Best-of-three series
Tigres del Licey	2–0
Cardenales de Lara	0–2

== Individual leaders ==
Player	Statistic
Batting
Gerónimo Berroa (DOM)	Batting average	.471
Nine tied	Home runs	1
Jerry Brooks (DOM)	RBI	10
Pitching
Mélido Pérez (DOM)	Wins	2

== All-Star Team ==
Name	Position
Raúl Martínez (MEX)	Catcher
Henry Rodríguez (DOM)	First baseman
Luis Sojo (VEN)	Second baseman
Andújar Cedeño (DOM)	Third baseman
Juan Bell (DOM)	Shortstop
Gerónimo Berroa (DOM)	Left fielder
Derek Bell (VEN)	Center fielder
Edwin Alicea (PUR)	Right fielder
Randy Knorr (VEN)	Designated hitter
Mélido Pérez (DOM)	Right-handed pitcher
Mercedes Esquer (MEX)	Left-handed pitcher
Mike Timlin (VEN)	Relief pitcher
Awards
Gerónimo Berroa (DOM); Jerry Brooks (DOM)	Most Valuable Player
John Roseboro (DOM)	Manager

== See also ==
- Ballplayers who have played in the Series

== Sources ==
- Nuñez, José Antero (1994). Serie del Caribe de la Habana a Puerto La Cruz. JAN Editor. ISBN 980-07-2389-7
- Bjarman, Peter (1994). Baseball with a Latin Beat : A History of the Latin American Game. McFarland & Company. ISBN 978-0-89-950973-0
- Bjarkman, Peter (2005). Diamonds around the Globe: The Encyclopedia of International Baseball. Greenwood Publishing Group. ISBN 031-3322-68-6
- Van Hyning, Thomas E. (2008). The Santurce Crabbers: Sixty Seasons of Puerto Rican Winter League Baseball. McFarland & Company. ISBN 078-6438-95-9
