= Ken Oberkfell =

American baseball player (born 1956)

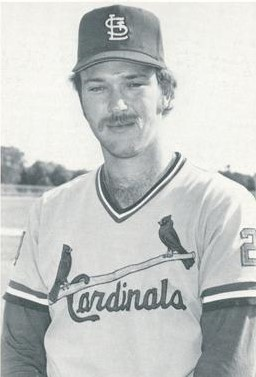
- Third baseman
- Born: May 4, 1956 (age 70); Highland, Illinois, U.S.
- Batted: Left Threw: Right

MLB debut
- August 22, 1977, for the St. Louis Cardinals

Last MLB appearance
- October 4, 1992, for the California Angels

MLB statistics
- Batting average: .278
- Home runs: 29
- Runs batted in: 446
- Stats at Baseball Reference

Teams
- St. Louis Cardinals (1977–1984); Atlanta Braves (1984–1988); Pittsburgh Pirates (1988–1989); San Francisco Giants (1989); Houston Astros (1990–1991); California Angels (1992)

Career highlights and awards
- World Series champion (1982)

Kenneth Ray Oberkfell (born May 4, 1956) is an American former third baseman. He played from 1977 to 1992 for six different teams. Oberkfell primarily played third base but he also played over 400 career games at second base. After retiring as a player, Oberkfell served as a baseball coach. He has primarily coached in the minor leagues, but he spent the part of the 2008 as the New York Mets first base coach and spent the 2011 season as the Mets bench coach.

== Playing career ==
Signed by the St. Louis Cardinals as an amateur free agent in 1975, Oberkfell made his Major League Baseball debut with the St. Louis Cardinals on August 22, 1977, and appeared in his final game on October 4, 1992. Oberkfell was a member of the 1982 World Series Champion St. Louis Cardinals, hitting .292 in that series.

Oberkfell was part of the "Bearded Braves" triumvirate along with Glenn Hubbard and Bruce Sutter. He told Neil Holfeld of the Houston Chronicle in a May 17, 1985, story that, "the beards make us stand out from the clean cut Dale Murphy types. Consider us a modern era House of David team."

== Career statistics ==
In a 16-year major league career covering 1602 games, Oberkfell compiled a .278 batting average (1354-for-4874) with 558 runs, 237 doubles, 44 triples, 29 home runs, 446 RBI and 546 base on balls. He finished his career with a .973 fielding percentage. In 17 postseason games, he batted .245 (12-for-49).

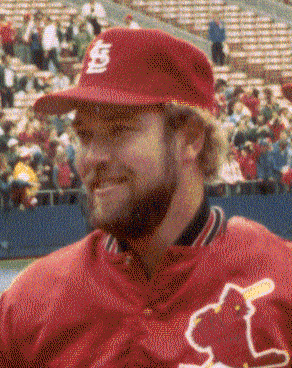
Oberkfell with the St. Louis Cardinals in 1983

== Coaching career ==
After his retirement as a player in 1992, Oberkfell embarked on a successful managerial career that saw him named Minor League Manager of the Year by Baseball America in 2005. He also served as the manager of the New Orleans Zephyrs from January 4, 2007, until June 17, 2008, when he was promoted to the Mets as their first base coach, replacing Tom Nieto. During 2009 and 2010, Oberkfell managed the Mets' Triple-A farm team, the Buffalo Bisons. On January 28, 2010, Oberkfell led the Leones del Escogido to their 13th championship in the Dominican Baseball Winter League as their manager.

He was interviewed for the Mets managerial opening in November 2010. He was named the New York Mets bench coach for the 2011 season, but was not hired back for 2012. Oberkfell served as the manager of the Newark Bears of the independent Can-Am League during the 2012 season before stepping down in August.

Oberkfell managed the Leones del Escogido of the Dominican Republic to the Caribbean Series championship title in 2010 and 2012.

In 2013, Oberkfell became the manager of the Lincoln Saltdogs in Lincoln, Nebraska. He resigned for family reasons after the 2015 season.

== Personal life ==
Oberkfell married Jamie Smith in January 1985. They had three children: Daughter Tami, son Joseph, and daughter Elizabeth. Oberkfell and Jamie divorced in 1996; Jamie died in 2020. Oberkfell was married to Tina Marie (née Pillow) from 1997 until her death from cancer in September 2016.
