= Gerónimo Berroa =

Dominican baseball player (born 1965)

- Outfielder / Designated hitter
- Born: March 18, 1965 (age 61); Santo Domingo, Dominican Republic
- Batted: Right Threw: Right

Professional debut
- MLB: April 5, 1989, for the Atlanta Braves
- KBO: 2002, for the Lotte Giants

Last appearance
- MLB: May 30, 2000, for the Los Angeles Dodgers
- KBO: 2002, for the Lotte Giants

MLB statistics
- Batting average: .276
- Home runs: 101
- Runs batted in: 382

KBO statistics
- Batting average: .097
- Home runs: 1
- Runs batted in: 3
- Stats at Baseball Reference

Teams
- Atlanta Braves (1989–1990); Cincinnati Reds (1992); Florida Marlins (1993); Oakland Athletics (1994–1997); Baltimore Orioles (1997); Cleveland Indians (1998); Detroit Tigers (1998); Toronto Blue Jays (1999); Los Angeles Dodgers (2000); Lotte Giants (2002)

Member of the Caribbean

Baseball Hall of Fame
- Induction: 2016

Gerónimo Emiliano Berroa (born March 18, 1965) is a Dominican former professional baseball outfielder. He played for nine Major League Baseball (MLB) teams from 1989 to 2000, and also played one season in the KBO League in 2002.

Signed by the Toronto Blue Jays as an amateur free agent in 1983, he worked his way through the minor leagues. After the 1988 season, he was picked up by the Atlanta Braves in the rule 5 draft. He made his major league debut on April 5, 1989. He spent 1989 and a small amount of 1990 with the Braves, and spend most of 1990 and 1991 with the Richmond Braves and Colorado Springs Sky Sox, respectively. He returned to the majors in 1992 with the Cincinnati Reds, and the following year was an inaugural member of the 1993 Florida Marlins expansion team.

After the season, he signed as a free agent with the Oakland Athletics, and had his best years with that team. Berroa's best season was 1996 when he hit 36 home runs with 106 RBIs for the Athletics. He spent the next three seasons with the Baltimore Orioles, Cleveland Indians, Detroit Tigers, Blue Jays, and Los Angeles Dodgers.

In 11 major league seasons, he hit 101 home runs, had 692 hits, and 510 strikeouts. He played for the Korea Baseball Organization's Lotte Giants in 2002 and the Sultanes de Monterrey of the Mexican League in 2003 before retiring.

Berroa played with the Dominican club Leones del Escogido, winning the 1988, 1990 and 1991 Caribbean Series, winning the MVP award in 1990 and 1991, and being inducted into the Caribbean Baseball Hall of Fame in 2016.

On December 20, 2007, Berroa was accused by former major league pitcher Jason Grimsley of using anabolic steroids in a federal agent's affidavit.
