= 1974 Caribbean Series =

1974 baseball tournament

The seventeenth edition of the Caribbean Series (Serie del Caribe) was played in 1974. It was held from February 1 through February 6 with the champions teams from Dominican Republic, Mexico and Puerto Rico, represented by the Tigres del Licey, Venados de Mazatlán and Criollos de Caguas, respectively. This time Venezuela did not participate in the tournament due to a players strike, being replaced by the second place team from the Mexican Pacific League, the Yaquis de Obregón. The format consisted of 12 games, each team facing the other teams twice, and the games were played in Hermosillo, Sonora, to become the first Caribbean Series held in Mexican baseball history.

== Summary ==
Final standings
Club	W	L	W/L %	GB	Managers
Puerto Rico	4	2	.667	–	Bobby Wine
Dominican Republic	3	3	.500	1.0	Tommy Lasorda
Mexico (Obregón)	3	3	.500	1.0	Mike Alejandro
Mexico (Mazatlán)	2	4	.333	2.0	Ronny Camacho

Individual leaders
Player/Club	Statistic
Héctor Espino / (MEX [Obregón])	Batting average	.429
Derrel Thomas / (MEX [Obregón])	Home runs	2
Celerino Sánchez / (MEX [Obregón])	Runs batted in	11
Charlie Hough / (DOM)	Wins	2
Ed Bauta / (MEX [Obregón])	Earned run average	0.69
Ed Bauta / (MEX [Obregón])	Innings pitched	13.0
Ramón Hernández / (PUR)	Saves	2
Awards
Héctor Espino / (MEX [Obregón])	Most Valuable Player
Bobby Wine / (PUR)	Manager

All-Star Team
Name/Club	Position
Gary Carter / (PUR)	catcher
Héctor Espino / (MEX [Obregón])	first baseman
Jorge Orta / (MEX [Obregón])	second baseman
Celerino Sánchez / (MEX [Obregón])	third baseman
Rudy Meoli / (PUR)	shortstop
Jesús Alou / (DOM)	left fielder
César Gerónimo / (DOM)	center fielder
Tom Paciorek / (DOM)	right fielder
Ed Bauta / (MEX [Obregón])	RH pitcher
Ramón Hernández / (PUR)	LH pitcher
Bobby Wine / (PUR)	Manager

=== Scoreboards ===
==== Game 1, February 1 ====
Team	1	2	3	4	5	6	7	8	9	R	H	E
Mexico (Obregón)	0	0	0	0	0	0	1	0	0	1	5	0
Puerto Rico	2	0	0	0	0	0	0	0	x	2	5	0
WP: Craig Swan (1-0) LP: Rafael Garcia (0-1) Sv: Ramón Hernández (1); Home runs: MEX: Héctor Espino (1); PUR: None

==== Game 2, February 1 ====
Team	1	2	3	4	5	6	7	8	9	R	H	E
Dominican Republic	0	0	0	1	0	0	1	0	0	2	5	0
Mexico (Mazatlán)	2	0	0	0	0	0	0	0	1	3	4	0
WP: Aurelio López (1-0) LP: Charlie Hough (0-1); Home runs: DOM: César Gerónimo (1); MEX: Celerino Sánchez (1)

==== Game 3, February 2 ====
Team	1	2	3	4	5	6	7	8	9	R	H	E
Puerto Rico	0	0	1	0	0	0	0	0	0	1	7	0
Dominican Republic	0	0	0	1	0	0	1	0	x	2	7	1
WP: Pedro Borbón (1-0) LP: Don DeMola (0-1) Sv: Charlie Hough (1); Home runs: PRI: Gary Carter (1); DOM: None

==== Game 4, February 2 ====
Team	1	2	3	4	5	6	7	8	9	R	H	E
Mexico (Mazatlán)	0	0	0	0	0	0	0	0	3	3	4	0
Mexico (Obregón)	0	5	0	0	0	3	0	0	x	8	13	1
WP: Vicente Romo (1-0) LP: George Meyring (0-1); Notes: Romo was pitching a no-hitter into the ninth inning.

==== Game 5, February 3 ====
Team	1	2	3	4	5	6	7	8	9	R	H	E
Mexico (Obregón)	0	0	2	0	1	0	0	0	0	5	10	3
Dominican Republic	1	0	0	0	0	0	0	0	0	1	4	4
WP: Ed Bauta (1-0) LP: Bruce Ellingsen (0-1)

==== Game 6, February 3 ====
Team	1	2	3	4	5	6	7	8	9	R	H	E
Puerto Rico	0	0	0	0	0	0	2	0	0	2	3	0
Mexico (Mazatlán)	0	1	0	0	0	0	0	0	0	1	5	2
WP: John Montague (1-0) LP: Joe Pactwa (0-1) Sv: Steve Blateric (1)

==== Game 7, February 4 ====
Team	1	2	3	4	5	6	7	8	9	R	H	E
Dominican Republic	0	0	0	1	0	0	2	0	0	3	9	3
Puerto Rico	1	0	2	0	1	1	1	0	x	6	13	0
WP: Steve Blateric (1-0) LP: Tony Barrientos (0-1); Home runs: DOM: None; PRI: Jerry Morales (1), Rudy Meoli (1)

==== Game 8, February 4 ====
Team	1	2	3	4	5	6	7	8	9	R	H	E
Mexico (Obregón)	2	0	0	0	3	0	1	1	1	8	10	0
Mexico (Mazatlán)	0	0	3	0	0	0	2	0	0	5	12	3
WP: Dennis O'Toole (1-0) LP: Aurelio López (1-1); Home runs: MEX (Obregón): Jorge Orta (1), Derrel Thomas (1); MEX (Mazatlán): None

==== Game 9, February 5 ====
Team	1	2	3	4	5	6	7	8	9	R	H	E
Puerto Rico	0	1	0	0	0	0	1	2	0	4	9	1
Mexico (Obregón)	0	0	0	0	0	0	0	0	1	1	5	2
WP: Eduardo Rodríguez (1-0) LP: César Díaz (0-1) Sv: Ramón Hernández (2)

==== Game 10, February 5 ====
Team	1	2	3	4	5	6	7	8	9	10	11	R	H	E
Mexico (Mazatlán)	1	0	0	0	0	0	0	1	0	0	0	2	5	5
Dominican Republic	0	0	0	0	2	0	0	0	0	0	1	3	9	2
WP: Charlie Hough (1-1) LP: Aurelio López (1-2)

==== Game 11, February 6 ====
Team	1	2	3	4	5	6	7	8	9	R	H	E
Dominican Republic	0	0	0	0	1	0	1	1	0	3	13	0
Mexico (Obregón)	0	0	2	0	0	0	0	0	0	2	9	3
WP: Charlie Hough (2-1) LP: Dennis O'Toole (1-1) Sv: José Vidal (1); Home runs: DOM: None; MEX: Derrel Thomas (2); Notes: Hough set a record for pitching in all six games of a Caribbean Series.

==== Game 12, February 6 ====
Team	1	2	3	4	5	6	7	8	9	R	H	E
Mexico (Mazatlán)	0	0	0	0	0	0	0	0	1	1	8	0
Puerto Rico	0	0	0	0	0	0	0	0	0	0	6	0
WP: Eleno Cuen (1-0) LP: Willie Hernández (0-1)

== Sources ==
- Antero Núñez, José. Series del Caribe. Impresos Urbina, Caracas, Venezuela.
- Araujo Bojórquez, Alfonso. Series del Caribe: Narraciones y estadísticas, 1949-2001. Colegio de Bachilleres del Estado de Sinaloa, Mexico.
- Figueredo, Jorge S. Cuban Baseball: A Statistical History, 1878–1961. Macfarland & Co., United States.
- González Echevarría, Roberto. The Pride of Havana. Oxford University Express.
- Gutiérrez, Daniel. Enciclopedia del Béisbol en Venezuela, Caracas, Venezuela.
