= Leones del Escogido =

Professional baseball team in Santo Domingo, Dominican Republic

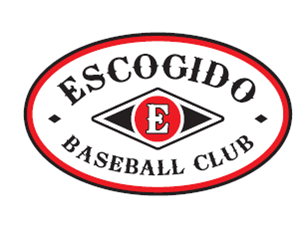
Logo
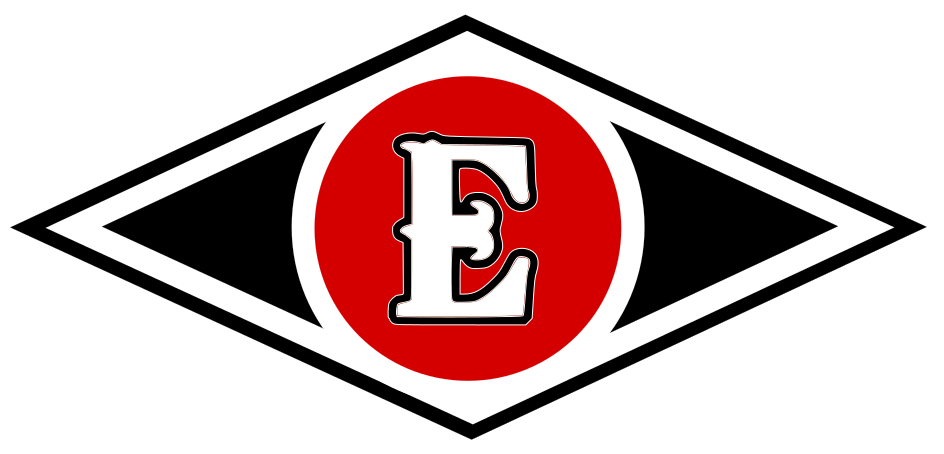
Cap insignia

Information
- League: Dominican Professional Baseball League
- Location: Santo Domingo, Dominican Republic
- Ballpark: Estadio Quisqueya Juan Marichal (1955–present)
- Founded: 17 February 1921; 105 years ago
- Nickname(s): Los Escarlatas ("The Scarlets"); Los Melenudos ("The Melenudos"); Los Duros de Matar ("The Hard to Kill"); La Maquinaria Roja ("The Red Machinery"); La Tabla Escarlata ("The Scarlet Table")
- Caribbean Series championships: 5: (1988; 1990; 2010; 2012; 2025)
- League championships: 18: (1955–56; 1956–57; 1957–58; 1959–60; 1960–61; 1968–69; 1980–81; 1981–82; 1987–88; 1988–89; 1989–90; 1991–92; 2009–10; 2011–12; 2012–13; 2015–16; 2024–25; 2025–26)
- Former name: Los Capitaleños de los Escogidos
- Former ballpark(s): Hipódromo La Primavera (1922–1929); Estadio La Normal (1951–1955)
- Colors: Red, white, black
- Mascot: El León "Rufo" ("The Lion Rufo")
- Retired numbers: 0; 1; 3; 4; 5; 10; 10; 11; 14; 17; 17; 20; 20; 21; 23; 27; 28; 36; 38; 41; 44; 45
- Ownership: Empresas Najri; Grupo Vicini; Grupo SID
- President: Eduardo Alberto Najri Molini
- General manager: Carlos Peña
- Manager: Ramón Santiago
- Media: MLB.tv (in Spanish and English); Digital 15 (in Spanish); Claro TV (1092 HD) (in Spanish); Altice TV (60, 476 HD) (in Spanish); Independencia 93.3 FM (in Spanish); Ke Buena 105.5 FM (in Spanish); Ke Buena 105.5 FM Santiago (in Spanish); Digital 15 Online (in Spanish)
- Website: www.escogido.com (in Spanish)

Current uniforms
Home	Away	Third

The Escogido Baseball Club, also called Escogido BBC, and better known by its commercial name Leones del Escogido (LE; English: Chosen One Lions or Lions of the Chosen or Picked Lions) is a professional baseball team in the Dominican Professional Baseball League (LIDOM). Founded on February 17, 1921, it is one of two franchises in LIDOM based in Santo Domingo, Dominican Republic, the other being Tigres del Licey, and both teams share Estadio Quisqueya Juan Marichal as their home ballpark venue.

Leones are the third most successful team in the Dominican Winter League surpassed only by Tigres del Licey and Águilas Cibaeñas, having won 18 national championships and 5 Caribbean Series titles.

== History ==
Leones del Escogido was founded in February 17, 1921, initially known as Los Capitaleños de los Escogidos in 1921, to be able to surpass Tigres del Licey, which since that time has been the most winning team in the league. It was devised to form the new team, composed of the best players of Los Muchachos, San Carlos and Delco Lite, leading to the disintegration of them and forming a kind of "Dream Team". Its main pioneers were Carlos Manuel Bonetti Burgos "Pilindo", Luis Alfau, J. Enrique Alfau, Eusebio Martínez, and Federico Nina.

Leones' record book is dominated by the Alou brothers: Matty, Felipe, and Jesús. The brothers hold the first, second, and third spots in the team's record book for the following: games played, runs, at bats, hits, home runs and RBIs. Matty and Felipe are one-two in several more categories, including walks and stolen bases.

In the 1955–1956 season, Leones del Escogido faced Águilas Cibaeñas in the championship series; Águilas had previously won a title in 1952 against Tigres del Licey, although that victory did not count toward the records of the newly established league. Having previously lost the 1951 final to Tigres del Licey, Leones del Escogido were seeking their first championship as a professional team and ultimately became the first champions of the Dominican Professional Baseball League (LIDOM).

=== Rivalry with Tigres del Licey ===
By the end of the 1980s, Leones del Escogido held ten national championships while their rivals, Licey, held twelve; Leones had thus been displaced as the dominant force in Dominican baseball. However, within that decade, both the Leones and Tigres were tied with four championships each, with the Leones closing out the decade by winning its final championship.

As the intensity among fans of both teams mounted due to their repeated clashes, the talk of the town was the famous "Citychamps" head to head series that sparked heated debates among supporters and journalists alike in Santo Domingo. The passion of Dominican fans back then bordered on outright hostility, and no rivalry of such magnitude has emerged since.

== 2026–27 season Roster ==
- Updated on November 20, 2026.

Leones del Escogido Roster
2026–27 LIDOM season
Active players		Inactive players	Coaches/Others
Starting pitchers: 76 (United States) Jeremy Rhoades; -- (Dominican Republic) Radhames Liz; -- (Dominican Republic) Domingo Germán; Relief pitchers: 88 (United States) Kelly Austin; 89 (United States) Patrick Halligan; 78 (Dominican Republic) Alex Colomé; 40 (Dominican Republic) Ángel Sánchez; 46 (Panama) Kenny Hernández; -- (United States) Derek West; -- (United States) Spencer Bauer; 61 (Dominican Republic) Héctor Neris; 79 (Dominican Republic) Aneurys Zabala; 77 (Dominican Republic) Ivan Armstrong; -- (Dominican Republic) Jarlín García; 46 (Puerto Rico) José Espada; -- (Dominican Republic) Luis Guerrero; -- (Dominican Republic) Sauryn Lao; Closing pitchers: 62 (United States) Brian McKenna	Catcher: 67 (United States) Jason Schiavone; 55 (Dominican Republic) Michael De La Cruz; -- (Dominican Republic) Randy Florentino; Infielders: -- (Dominican Republic) John Gil; -- (Dominican Republic) Alejandro Mejía; -- (Dominican Republic) Carlos Santana; 8 (Dominican Republic) Yamaico Navarro; -- (Dominican Republic) Orlando Calixte; 7 (Dominican Republic) John Gil; 51 (United States) José Marmolejos; 35 (Dominican Republic) Luis De Los Santos; -- (Dominican Republic) Iván Castillo; 29 (Dominican Republic) Marco Hernández; 64 (Cuba) Andy Ibáñez; 8 (Dominican Republic) Jonathan Guzmán; 10 (Dominican Republic) Franchy Cordero; 37 (Dominican Republic) Erik González; Outfielders: -- (United States) Joshua Báez; 19 (Dominican Republic) Socrates Brito; -- (Dominican Republic) Carlos Jimenez; 2 (Dominican Republic) Vidal Bruján; 38 (Dominican Republic) Jimmy Paredes ^{(C)}; 0 (Dominican Republic) Junior Lake; -- (Dominican Republic) Darlin Moquete; 22 (Dominican Republic) Ramón Laureano; Designated hitter: 25 (Dominican Republic) Gregory Polanco		Manager: (Dominican Republic) Ramón Santiago; Coaches: (Dominican Republic) Guadalupe Jabalera (first base); (Dominican Republic) Héctor de la Cruz (third base); (Dominican Republic) Roberto Girón (bullpen coach); (Dominican Republic) Renny Pérez (bullpen catcher)

== Championship history ==
Leones del Escogido won the first championship in 1922 of a short-lived professional baseball era from 1922 to 1937, but only the current Winter League format established in 1951 is widely accepted.

Season	Manager	Runner-up
1922	Luis Alfau	Tigres del Licey
1955–56	Frank Genovese	Águilas Cibaeñas
1956–57	Red Davis	Tigres del Licey
1957–58	Salty Parker	Estrellas Orientales
1959–60	Pete Reiser	Estrellas Orientales
1960–61	Pepe Lucas	Águilas Cibaeñas
1968–69	Andy Gilbert	Estrellas Orientales
1980–81	Felipe Alou	Águilas Cibaeñas
1981–82	Felipe Alou	Estrellas Orientales
1987–88	Phil Regan	Estrellas Orientales
1988–89	Phil Regan	Tigres del Licey
1989–90	Felipe Alou	Águilas Cibaeñas
1991–92	Felipe Alou	Estrellas Orientales
2009–10	Ken Oberkfell	Gigantes del Cibao
2011–12	Ken Oberkfell	Aguilas Cibaeñas
2012–13	Audo Vicente	Aguilas Cibaeñas
2015–16	Luis Rojas	Tigres del Licey
2024-25	Albert Pujols	Tigres del Licey
2025-26	Ramon Santiago	Toros del Este
Total championships		19

== Caribbean Series Championships ==
Leones del Escogido have won five Caribbean Series in their history.

Year	Venue	Finish	Wins	Losses	Win%	Manager
1988	(Dominican Republic) Santo Domingo	1st	4	2	.667	Phil Regan
1990	(United States) Miami	1st	5	1	.833	Felipe Alou
2010	(Venezuela) Margarita Island	1st	5	1	.833	Ken Oberkfell
2012	(Dominican Republic) Santo Domingo	1st	4	2	.667	Ken Oberkfell
2025	(Mexico) Mexicali	1st	4	2	.667	Albert Pujols
2026	(Mexico) Zapopan	4th	3	2	.600	Ramón Santiago
Total			25	10	.714	

== Retired numbers ==
Reference.

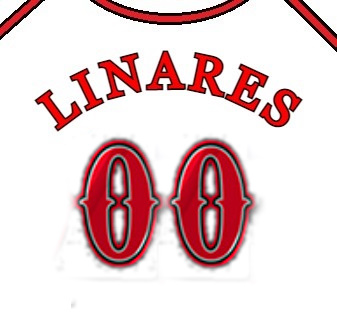
Rufino Linares
1974–1979, 1985–1992
OF

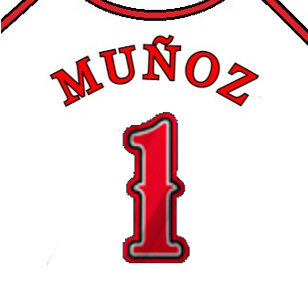
Luis "Gallego" Muñoz
1951–1959
IF

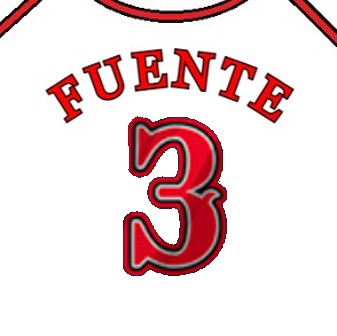
Tito Fuentes
1966–1974
IF

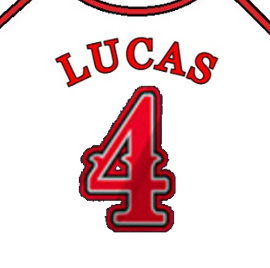
Pepe Lucas
1951–1957
IF

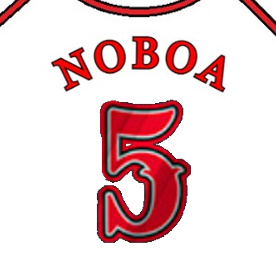
Junior Noboa
1987–1995
IF

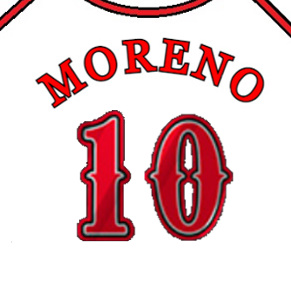
Mackey Moreno
1974–1989
OF

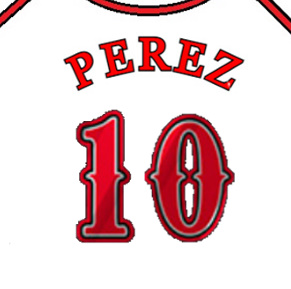
Neifi Perez
1995–2009
IF

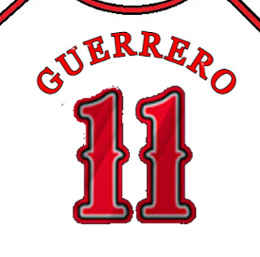
Mario Guerrero
1970–1980
IF

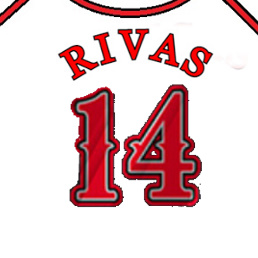
Danilo Rivas
1957–1972
P

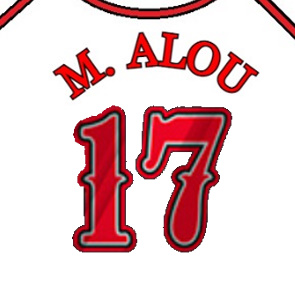
Mateo Alou
1957–1977
OF

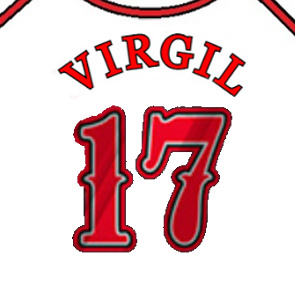
Osvaldo Virgil
1955–1959
IF

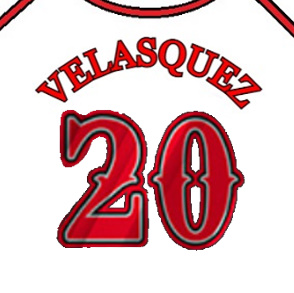
Freddie Velázquez
1957–1971, 1977–1978
C

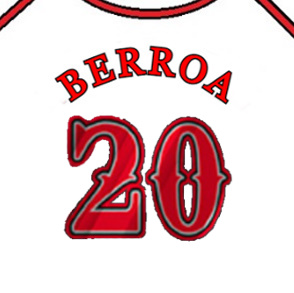
Gerónimo Berroa
1987–1996, 2002–2003
IF

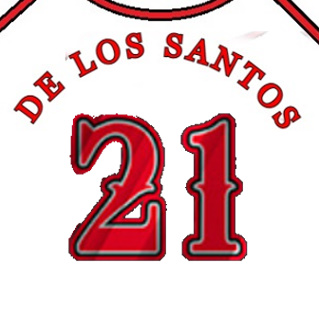
Luis de los Santos
1987–1993, 2000–2003
IF

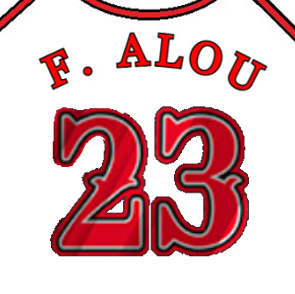
Felipe Alou
1956–1972
OF

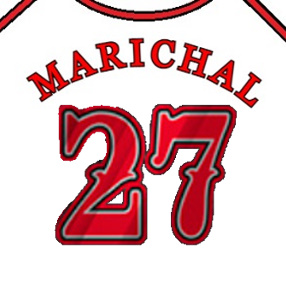
Juan Marichal
1957–1974
P

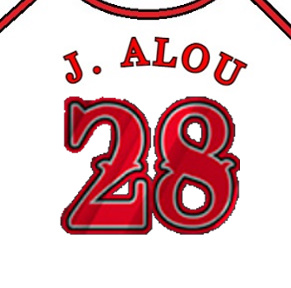
Jesús Alou
1959–1972, 1980–1982
OF

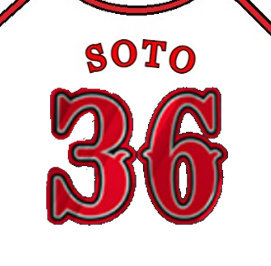
Mario Melvin Soto
1975–1987
P

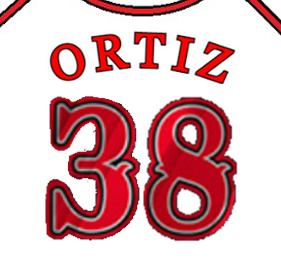
David Ortiz
1999–2004
IF

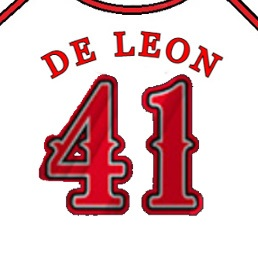
José DeLeón
1983–1989, 1996–1997
P

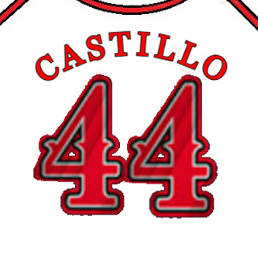
Wilkin Castillo
2008–2022
C

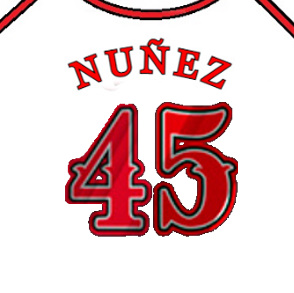
José Núñez
1987–1999, 2000–2005
P

== Presidents ==
Reference.

- 1921: Rafael Esteva "Fello"
- 1922: Gilberto Pellerano
- 1923: José R. Sanz
- 1924: Francisco Caro "Quico"
- 1928: Alfredo Ginebra
- 1929: Mario Abreu Victoria
- 1933–1934: Federico Geraldino
- 1934–1957: Francisco Martínez Alba
- 1957–1958: Horacio Alvarez Saviñon
- 1958–1959: Ramón Imbert Rainieri
- 1959–1964: Máximo Hernández Ortega
- 1964–1965: Ramón Imbert Rainieri
- 1966–1968: Emil Kasse Acta
- 1968–1973: Ramón Imbert Rainieri
- 1973–1984: Félix Mario Aguiar
- 1984–1989: Julio Morales
- 1989–2004: Daniel Aquino Méndez
- 2004–2009: Julio Hazim
- 2009–2013: Luis Manuel Bonetti
- 2013–2015: Marcial Najri
- 2015–2018: Felipe Vicini
- 2018–2021: José Miguel Bonetti
- 2021–2024: Luis Manuel Bonetti Veras
- 2024–present: Eduardo Alberto Najri Molini

== Gallery ==
Retired numbers players at Estadio Quisqueya Juan Marichal

Escogido Shop at Estadio Quisqueya Juan Marichal

== See also ==
- Dominican Professional Baseball League (LIDOM)
- Caribbean Series (Spanish: Serie del Caribe)
- Dragones de Ciudad Trujillo
- Caimanes del Sur
