= 2027 Caribbean Series =

2027 baseball tournament

Tournament details
- Country: Mexico
- City: Hermosillo
- Venue: Estadio Fernando Valenzuela
- Dates: 1 – 7 February 2027
- Teams: 5

The 2027 Caribbean Series will be the 69th edition of the Caribbean Series club baseball tournament, scheduled from 1 to 7 February 2027, at the Estadio Fernando Valenzuela in Hermosillo, Sonora, Mexico.

The tournament features the winners of the respective winter league baseball leagues of the Caribbean Professional Baseball Confederation (CPBC) four full members; Dominican Republic (LIDOM), Mexico (LMP), Puerto Rico (LBPRC), and Venezuela (LVBP), plus a special guest as the fifth team.

== Tournament format ==
A single round-robin format; each team faces each other once. The four teams with the best records advance to the semi-finals (1st vs. 4th and 2nd vs. 3rd). The two winners will play in the final to decide the tournament champion.
