= Jerry Brooks =

American baseball player (born 1967)

- Outfielder
- Born: March 23, 1967 (age 59); Syracuse, New York, U.S.
- Batted: Right Threw: Right

Professional debut
- MLB: September 6, 1993, for the Los Angeles Dodgers
- NPB: April 5, 1997, for the Nippon-Ham Fighters

Last appearance
- MLB: September 28, 1996, for the Florida Marlins
- NPB: October 17, 1998, for the Nippon-Ham Fighters

MLB statistics
- Batting average: .286
- Home runs: 1
- Runs batted in: 4

NPB statistics
- Batting average: .261
- Home runs: 41
- Runs batted in: 136
- Stats at Baseball Reference

Teams
- Los Angeles Dodgers (1993); Florida Marlins (1996); Nippon-Ham Fighters (1997–1998)

Jerome Edward Brooks (born March 23, 1967) is a former Major League Baseball outfielder for the Los Angeles Dodgers and Florida Marlins. He played in 17 games during the 1993 and 1996 seasons. He also played for the Nippon-Ham Fighters of the Japanese Pacific League.

Brooks attended Clemson University. In 1987 he played collegiate summer baseball with the Cotuit Kettleers of the Cape Cod Baseball League and was named a league all-star. He was selected by the Dodgers in the 12th round of the 1988 MLB draft.

Brooks' career is remarkable in that he is the only player in Major League Baseball history to have exactly four hits that comprise a cycle. He had a double and home run in his nine game with the Dodgers in 1993, then hit a single and triple in his five games with the Marlins in 1996. No other MLB player ever finished his career with exactly four hits; each of a different variety.

== See also ==
- 1991 Caribbean Series
