= Potros de Tijuana =

Mexican baseball team

- Logo

Information
- League: Sunset League (1949–1950); Southwest International League (1951–1952); Arizona–Mexico League (1956); Mexican Pacific League (1977–1991); Mexican League (2005–2008)
- Location: Tijuana, Baja California
- Ballpark: Estadio Nacional de Tijuana
- Founded: 1977
- Folded: 2008
- League championships: 2 (1987–88, 1990–91)
- Colors: Blue, red and white

The Potros de Tijuana (English: Tijuana Colts) were a professional baseball team based in Tijuana, Baja California. The Potros played in the Mexican Pacific League and later in the Mexican League. The team played their home games at the Estadio Nacional de Tijuana.

== History ==
=== Early history ===
An earlier incarnation of the Potros de Tijuana played in the short-lived Sunset League from 1949–1950 (originally as the Salinas Colts), and moved to the Southwest International League from 1951–1952. After three years of absence, they became a member of the Arizona–Mexico League during the 1956 season.

=== Mexican Pacific League ===
Potros de Tijuana joined the Mexican Pacific League in 1977, taking championship titles in the 1987–1988 and 1990–1991 seasons to advance to the Caribbean Series in both times.

=== Mexican League ===
The franchise actually was a descendant of the Triple-A Toros de Tijuana before the Mexican League reportedly to have stripped the Toros owner of his franchise and gave it to new owners, who renamed the team as the Potros de Tijuana. The team played its games at Estadio Calimax.

The new Toros ownership kept the same team name, logo, uniforms and history, as a result of the alleged political wrangling that went on in that league.

In 2009, the Potros moved to Reynosa, Tamaulipas and were renamed the Broncos de Reynosa.

=== Golden Baseball League ===
On 15 December 2008, the Golden Baseball League signed a letter of intent to bring an expansion franchise to Tijuana after the 2008 Mexican League franchise was disbanded and relocated to Reynosa, Tamaulipas.

On 13 January 2009, the league officially welcomed the Potros. They were to join fellow expansion teams, the Tucson Toros and Victoria Seals.

On 7 May 2009 the GBL announced the postponement of the Potros' inaugural season until 2010 due to Mexico's swine flu outbreak and the subsequent health risk and precautionary measures that resulted from it.

Before the season was cancelled, the 2009 Potros had three Mexican Baseball Hall of Fame members on the coaching staff including Manager Mario Mendoza, Pitching Coach José Peña, and Bench Coach Jorge Fitch.

The Tijuana Potros changed their name to the Tijuana Cimarrones and joined the Golden Baseball League for one season in 2010.

== Championships ==
Season	Manager	Opponent	Series score	Record
1987–88	Jorge Fitch	Mayos de Navojoa	4–0	52–24
1990–91	Joel Serna	Tomateros de Culiacán	4–2	55–37–1
Total championships			2	

== Caribbean Series record ==
Year	Venue	Finish	Wins	Losses	Win%	Manager
1988	(Dominican Republic) Santo Domingo	3rd	3	3	.500	(Mexico) Jorge Fitch
1991	(United States) Miami	3rd	1	3	.250	(Mexico) Joel Serna
Total			4	6	.400	

== Notable players ==
- (United States) Brady Anderson
- (Mexico) Salvador Colorado
- (United States) John D'Acquisto
- (United States) Mike Gallego
- (United States) Luis Gonzalez
- (United States) Albert Hall
- (United States) Tommy Hinzo
- (United States) Tim Leary
- (Mexico) Andrés Mora
- (Panama) Ivan Murrell
- (Mexico) Jorge Orta
- (United States) Mike Ramsey
- (Mexico) José Tolentino
- (United States) Duane Walker

== See also ==
- Toros de Tijuana (Mexican League team)
- Tijuana Cimarrones (Golden Baseball League team)
