= José Tolentino =

Mexican baseball player (born 1961)

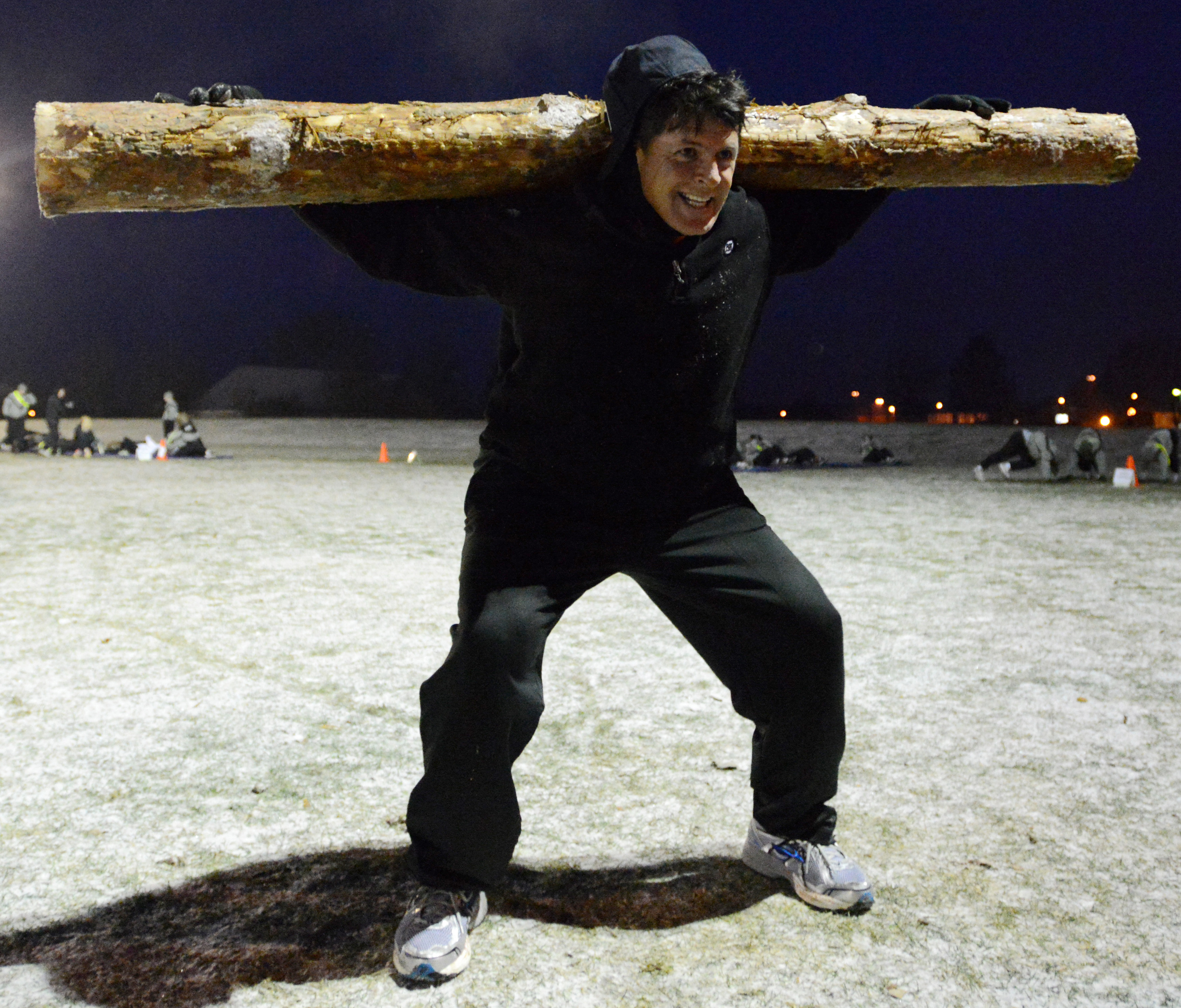
- Tolentino in Vilseck, Germany in 2013
- First baseman
- Born: June 3, 1961 (age 64); Mexico City, Mexico
- Batted: Left Threw: Left

Professional debut
- MLB: July 28, 1991, for the Houston Astros
- NPB: April 10, 1993, for the Seibu Lions

Last appearance
- MLB: October 6, 1991, for the Houston Astros
- NPB: July 3, 1993, for the Seibu Lions

MLB statistics
- Batting average: .259
- Home runs: 1
- Runs batted in: 6

NPB statistics
- Batting average: .152
- Home runs: 1
- Runs batted in: 6
- Stats at Baseball Reference

Teams
- Houston Astros (1991); Seibu Lions (1993)

José Franco Tolentino (born June 3, 1961) is a Mexican former professional first baseman who played in Major League Baseball and Nippon Professional Baseball. He played for the Houston Astros in 1991. He has coached for the Mexico national baseball team at various tournaments since at least the 2006 World Baseball Classic.

== Playing career ==
Tolentino began his college baseball career at Seminole State College in Oklahoma. He helped lead Seminole to the finals of the JUCO World Series in both 1981 and 1982. He was named to the all-tournament team in 1981. Tolentino was selected by the San Francisco Giants in the 36th round of the 1981 Major League Baseball draft but did not sign.

Tolentino earned all-conference honors in his only season at the University of Texas after hitting .339 and setting what were then school records with 73 RBI and 28 doubles. He hit .458 in regional play as Texas went on to win the College World Series title in Omaha in 1983. Tolentino was a nominee for the Golden Spikes Award along with Dave Magadan.

In the minors, he played for the Tucson Toros at Hi Corbett Field. Tolentino Led the Southern League in hits in 1986 with 170, was named to the Northwest League All-Star team in 1983, and finished third in the league in batting; the team also included Jose Canseco, Terry Steinbach and Mark McGwire. Before going to the big leagues in 1991, Tolentino hit in 30 consecutive games to wrap up the year. The streak was the longest in pro baseball. He hit.413 with 11 home runs during the streak (July 27 – September 1), and finished with 21 homers to lead Tucson. Tolentino drove in 56 of his 78 RBI in just two months, earning the 1990 Topps Baseball Achievement Awards for the month of August next to Jeff Bagwell.

Tolentino became the first Mexican to play in Japan. In Mexico, he led his team, Potros de Tijuana, to his first Pacific League title in 1991, and earned MVP for the season, batting .329 with 55 RBI and 11 home runs. In 1995 and 1996, he led Monterrey to its second straight Mexican League title hitting .342 with 104 hits, 24 doubles, 16 home runs, and 79 RBI.

== Coaching career ==
In 2007, he was a coach for the Mexican national baseball team at the 2007 Pan American Games. In 2008, he managed Mexico in the 2008 Beijing Olympics. He was a coach for Mexico in the 2006 and 2009 World Baseball Classics.

== Broadcasting career ==
Tolentino has worked as a broadcaster for ESPN, the Anaheim Angels, FOX Sports, FOX Sports International and Direct TV.

== Personal life ==
Tolentino's son, Milan, is a professional baseball player.

He is married to French-Canadian Nathalie Carrier.
