= Ramón Santiago =

Dominican baseball player & coach (born 1979)

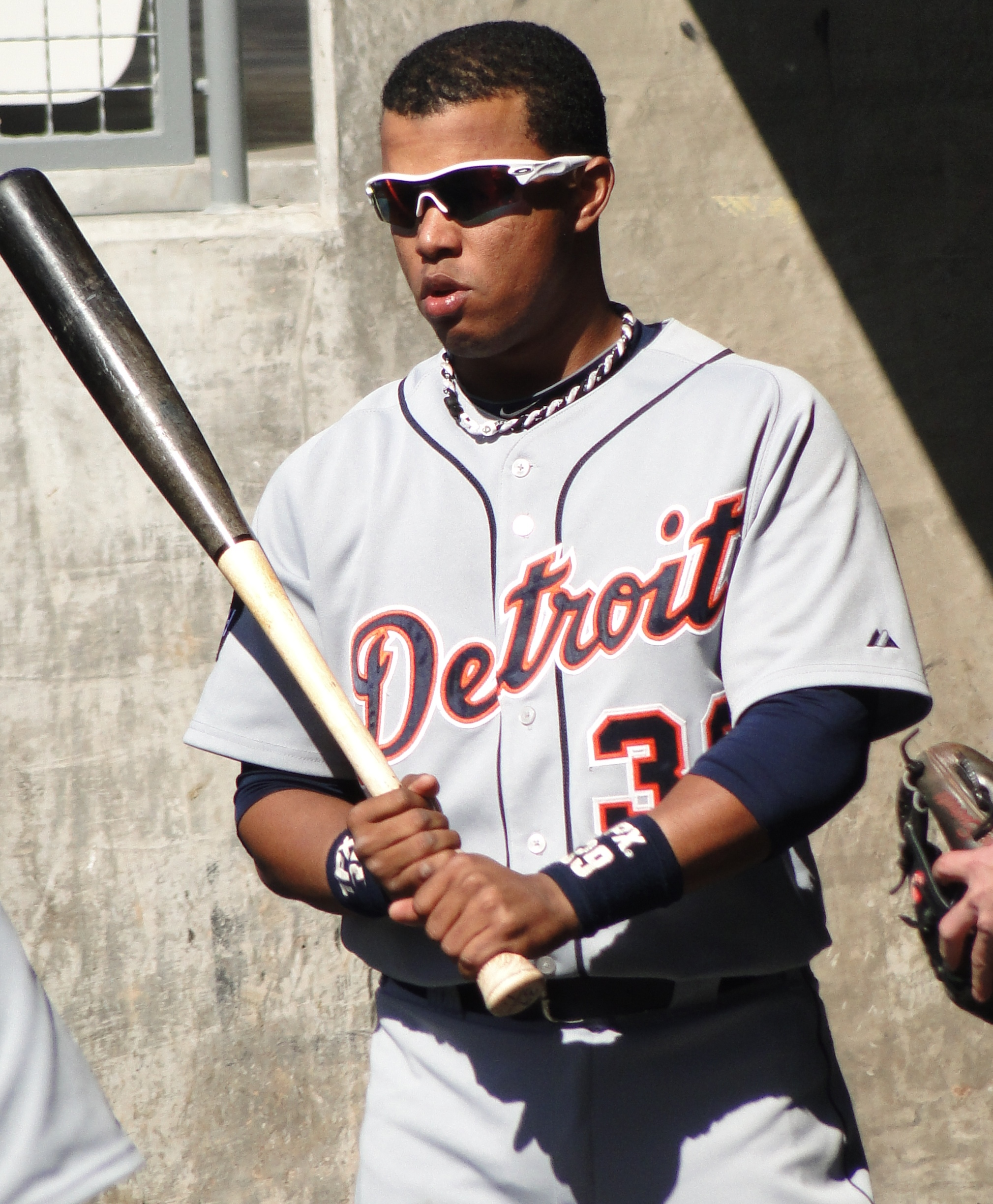
- Santiago with the Detroit Tigers in 2010

Leones del Escogido
- Shortstop / Second baseman / Manager
- Born: August 31, 1979 (age 47); Las Matas de Farfán, Dominican Republic
- Batted: Switch Threw: Right

MLB debut
- May 17, 2002, for the Detroit Tigers

Last MLB appearance
- September 27, 2014, for the Cincinnati Reds

MLB statistics
- Batting average: .243
- Home runs: 30
- Runs batted in: 214
- Stats at Baseball Reference

Teams
- As player: Detroit Tigers (2002–2003); Seattle Mariners (2004–2005); Detroit Tigers (2006–2013); Cincinnati Reds (2014); As coach: Detroit Tigers (2018–2022)

Ramón David Santiago Sanchez (born August 31, 1979) is a Dominican-American former professional baseball infielder and current manager for the Algodoneros de Unión Laguna of the Mexican League and the Leones del Escogido of the Dominican Professional Baseball League. He played in Major League Baseball (MLB) for the Detroit Tigers from 2002 to 2003, and 2006 to 2013, the Seattle Mariners from 2004 to 2005, and the Cincinnati Reds in 2014. He spent most of his major league career at shortstop, but also played a significant amount of time at second base, and occasionally third base.

Santiago is the only MLB player in history to hit a grand slam in his last at-bat with a walk-off home run. He accomplished this feat playing with the Reds with two outs in the bottom of the 10th inning on September 27, 2014, on a 1–0 pitch from the Pittsburgh Pirates' Bobby LaFromboise.

== Playing career ==
=== Detroit Tigers ===
Santiago made his major league debut for the Tigers in 2002. Used mainly as a backup, he was still named to the 2002 Topps All-Star Rookie Roster. During his rookie season, Santiago hit first-inning lead-off home runs on consecutive days (June 3, 2002 and June 4, 2002). In the June 3 game, he hit a second home run in the seventh inning. In 2003, Santiago assumed the starting shortstop role for the Tigers.

=== Seattle Mariners ===
Santiago struggled and was traded, along with minor league player Juan Gonzalez, to Seattle in exchange for Carlos Guillén.

During Santiago's two seasons with the Mariners, he played in only 27 games, spending most of his time in the minor leagues for the Triple-A Tacoma Rainiers. While playing for the Rainiers, Santiago was selected as the team's MVP and named the best defensive second baseman in the league by Baseball America. However, Santiago was released following the 2005 season.

=== Detroit Tigers (second stint) ===
Santiago re-signed with the Tigers as a free agent before the 2006 season. Santiago played in 43 regular-season games and started in 18 games for the American League champion Tigers in 2006. He played shortstop, second base, and third base and did not make an error in 205 2/3 innings of play. Santiago started at shortstop in Game 1 and Game 2 of the World Series.

Santiago played for the Cibao Gigantes in the Dominican Winter League in 2009 and 2010. He led the team to a second-place finish in the Dominican Winter League Championships in 2010 and was asked to play shortstop for the Escogido Leones on Team Dominicana in the 2010 Caribbean World Series, which the Dominican won as Santiago hit .316 at the plate.

During the Tigers run to the 2011 American League Central Division championship, Santiago played in 101 games, mostly at second base, and hit .260. His season highlights included a walk-off home run on August 30, which gave the Tigers a 2–1 victory over the Kansas City Royals in the bottom of the 10th inning. He also drove in the winning run with a walk-off triple in a June 13 game against the Tampa Bay Rays.

On November 30, 2011, the Tigers re-signed Santiago to a two-year extension, which kept him on the team through the 2013 season.

With the return of Omar Infante in July 2012, Santiago lost his every day second base position. He still played some games as a pinch hitter and as a late-inning defensive replacement. He also started at second and shortstop when needed. In a July 2013 game versus the Toronto Blue Jays, Colby Rasmus slid into second base, slide-tackling Infante, who was injured and placed on the disabled list. Santiago was called into the game and finished it out, and played several more games at second base until Infante returned.

=== Cincinnati Reds ===
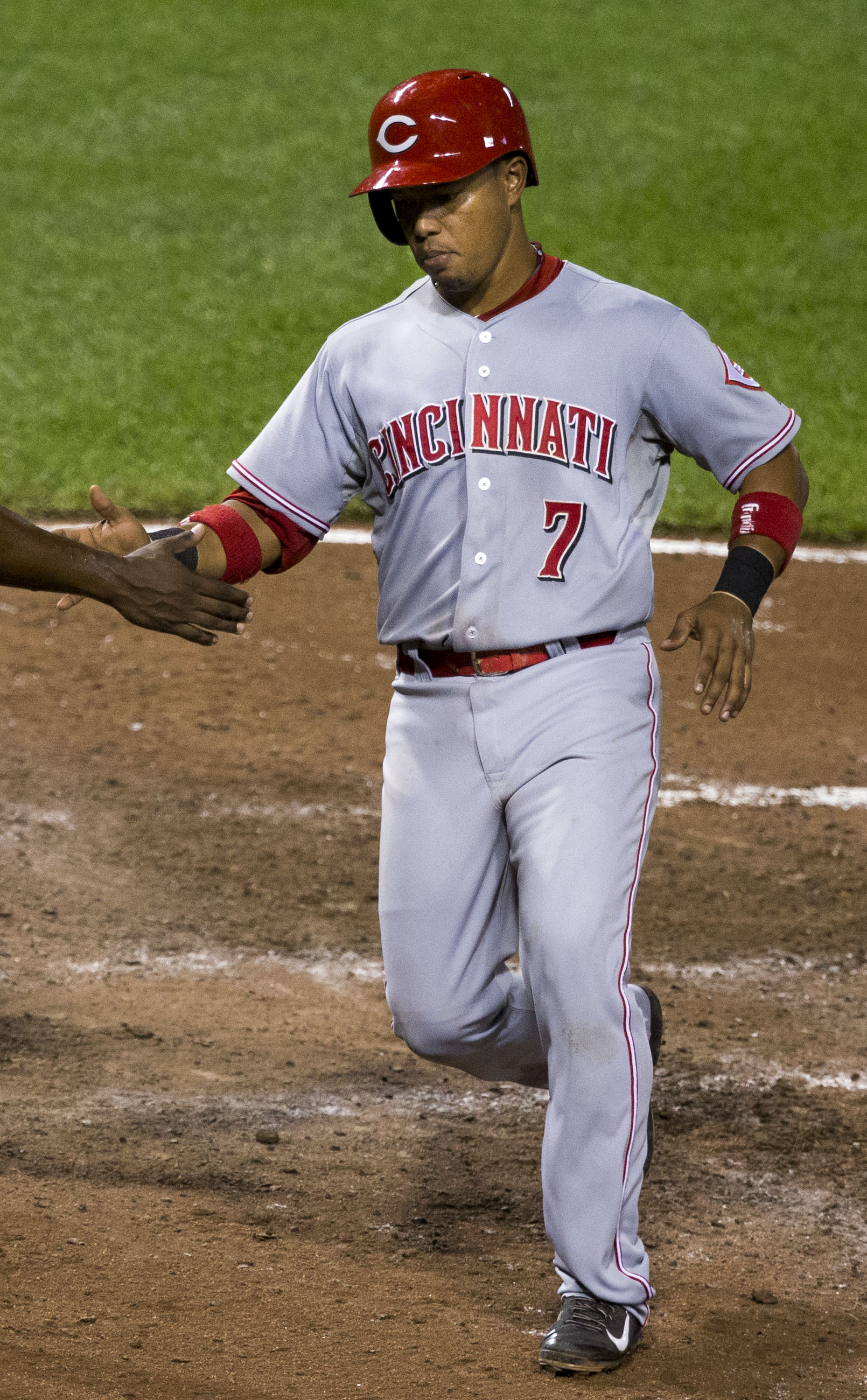
Santiago playing for the Cincinnati Reds in 2014

Santiago was a non-roster invitee to the 2014 Cincinnati Reds training camp, and he made the team as a reserve infielder. On September 27, he hit a walk-off grand slam in the 10th inning against Pittsburgh Pirates pitcher Bobby LaFromboise in what would be the last at-bat of Santiago's major league career. He elected free agency on October 30, 2014.

=== Toronto Blue Jays ===
Santiago signed a minor league deal with the Toronto Blue Jays on January 30, 2015. During a spring training game against the Atlanta Braves on March 15, Santiago broke his left collarbone. He was released on March 30. The Blue Jays re-signed him to a minor league contract on April 6. He started the season on the disabled list of the Triple-A Buffalo Bisons and was released on July 24.

== Coaching career ==
=== Detroit Tigers ===
Santiago rejoined the Detroit Tigers organization as a coach and served as the first base coach for the 2018 and 2019 seasons. He shifted to third base coach prior to the 2020 season. Following the hiring of new Tigers manager A. J. Hinch and third base coach Chip Hale for the 2021 season, the team announced Santiago would return to coaching first base. In 2022, he returned to coaching at third base. Following the season on October 7, 2022, Santiago was removed from the major-league coaching staff and was offered a player development role within the organization.

On August 10, 2024, Santiago was announced as the third base coach for the Dominican Republic national baseball team in the 2024 WBSC Premier12.

=== Leones de Yucatán ===
On November 29, 2024, Santiago was named the new manager for the Leones de Yucatán of the Mexican League. On May 26, 2025, Santiago was fired by Yucatán.

=== Algodoneros de Unión Laguna ===
On June 27, 2026, Santiago was named the new manager for the Algodoneros de Unión Laguna of the Mexican League, replacing Fernando Tatís.
