= Phil Regan (baseball) =

American baseball player and coach (1937–2026)

- Regan in 1957
- Pitcher / Manager
- Born: April 6, 1937; Otsego, Michigan, U.S.
- Died: July 8, 2026 (aged 89); Port St. Lucie, Florida, U.S.
- Batted: Right Threw: Right

MLB debut
- July 19, 1960, for the Detroit Tigers

Last MLB appearance
- July 15, 1972, for the Chicago White Sox

MLB statistics
- Win–loss record: 96–81
- Earned run average: 3.84
- Strikeouts: 743
- Saves: 92
- Managerial record: 71–73
- Winning %: .493
- Stats at Baseball Reference
- Managerial record at Baseball Reference

Teams
- As player: Detroit Tigers (1960–1965); Los Angeles Dodgers (1966–1968); Chicago Cubs (1968–1972); Chicago White Sox (1972); As manager: Baltimore Orioles (1995); As coach: Seattle Mariners (1984–1986); Cleveland Indians (1994); Chicago Cubs (1997–1998); Cleveland Indians (1999); New York Mets (2019)

Career highlights and awards
- All-Star (1966)

Philip Raymond Regan (April 6, 1937 – July 8, 2026) was an American professional baseball pitcher, scout and manager. He played in Major League Baseball (MLB) for the Detroit Tigers, Los Angeles Dodgers, Chicago Cubs, and Chicago White Sox; he also managed the Baltimore Orioles.

During the 1966 season, when Regan was Walter Alston's favorite pitcher from the Dodger bullpen, teammate Sandy Koufax nicknamed Regan "the Vulture", due to his knack of earning wins in late-inning relief situations.

Regan served as the pitching coach for the New York Mets for part of the 2019 season. He also enjoyed a long career as a manager in winter league baseball, winning the 1988 Caribbean Series with the Leones del Escogido, and piloting several other teams in the Dominican and Venezuelan leagues.

== Early years ==
Regan was born in Otsego, Michigan, on April 6, 1937. He earned varsity letters in basketball, football, and baseball at Wayland High School in Wayland, Michigan. After one year at Western Michigan University, he signed with the Detroit Tigers in 1956. He compiled a 61–42 record and 3.76 earned run average as a starting pitcher in the Tigers' farm system before earning a call up to the majors midway through the 1960 season.

== Playing career ==
=== Detroit Tigers ===
Regan made his major league debut on July 19 against the Washington Senators. Entering the game already behind 3–0, he allowed just two hits in five innings of work, including a home run to Harmon Killebrew.

He made his first career start in the second game of a doubleheader with the Baltimore Orioles on July 23. He left the game with two outs in the ninth inning with the score tied at three, and the bases loaded. Relief pitcher Clem Labine walked Jim Gentile to drive in the winning run, and hand Regan his first career loss. Splitting his time between starts and relief appearances, he was 0–4 with a 4.50 ERA his rookie season. His first career win also came against Baltimore during his second season in the big leagues, when he went 10–7 with a 5.25 ERA.

Over six seasons, Regan went 42–44 with a 4.50 ERA for the Detroit Tigers. He was 0–4 with a 4.99 ERA in 1965 when he was demoted to triple A Syracuse. He earned a call up that September, and made two appearances, but it was while he was with Syracuse that Regan learned of interest in him from the Dodgers organization.

=== Los Angeles Dodgers ===
Regan called Tigers General Manager Jim Campbell asking to be traded, and on December 15, 1965, he was traded to the Los Angeles Dodgers for infielder Dick Tracewski.

With Sandy Koufax, Don Drysdale, Claude Osteen, and Don Sutton in the starting rotation, Regan was used strictly as a reliever in 1966. He responded by going 14–1 with a 1.62 ERA, 88 strikeouts in 116 innings pitched and a National League leading 21 saves to help the Dodgers capture the National League pennant by a game and a half over the San Francisco Giants. It was on August 1 of that year, by Regan's own account, that he first acquired the "Vulture" moniker from Koufax, the latter having just exited his second consecutive game, tied 1–1, only to see Regan "swoop in" for the last-minute win.

The Sporting News named him the NL Reliever of the Year and NL Comeback Player of the Year in 1966. He also earned the only All-Star nod in his career, but did not appear in the game. He appeared in two games of the 1966 World Series, allowing just one base runner via a walk, and retiring the other five he faced.

Regan won his first two decisions in 1967 to give him 15 consecutive wins before finally losing to the Houston Astros on May 15. He won both games of a doubleheader with the New York Mets on April 21, 1968. Two days later, he was traded with Jim Hickman to the Chicago Cubs for Jim Ellis and Ted Savage.

=== Chicago Cubs ===
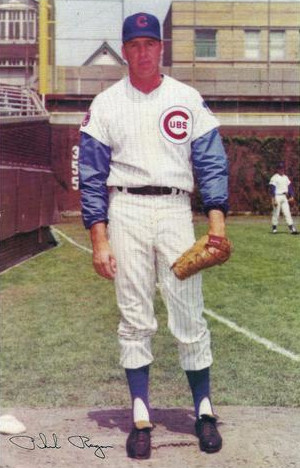
Regan in 1969 with the Chicago Cubs.

Regan provided similar heroics for his new team. In his first two appearances as a Cub, he saved both games of an April 28 doubleheader with the Houston Astros. Despite missing the first 14 games of the Cubs' schedule, Regan led all of Major League Baseball with 25 saves in 1968 on his way to capturing a second Sporting News Reliever of the Year Award.

He was involved in a bizarre incident on August 18, 1968, against the Cincinnati Reds. Regan apparently had good stuff that day, too good for home plate umpire Chris Pelekoudas. Despite no illegal substances being found on the ball, Pelekoudas called 14 illegal pitches on Regan based simply on the movement of the ball. Regan met with NL President Warren Giles on August 20, and was absolved of any wrongdoing. The incident earned Regan a reputation that followed him the rest of his career.

=== Retirement ===
During the twilight of his career, Regan found his workload diminishing rapidly. Through May 1972, Regan had pitched just four innings for the Cubs. He asked to be traded or released, and on June 2, Regan's contract was sold to the crosstown Chicago White Sox. He appeared in ten games for the Chisox, going 0–1 with a 4.05 ERA before his release on July 20 of that year.

=== Career stats ===
W	L	Pct	ERA	G	GS	CG	SHO	SV	IP	H	ER	R	HR	BB	K	BAA	WP	HBP	Fld%	Avg.
96	81	.542	3.84	551	105	20	1	92	1372.2	1392	585	649	150	447	743	.265	31	26	.976	.153

The only shutout of Regan's career came on May 10, 1963, against the Cleveland Indians. He also hit his only career home run in the 14–0 drubbing of the Tribe.

== Coaching career ==
Immediately upon retirement, Regan went into coaching. He accepted his first coaching job at Grand Valley State University in his home state of Michigan simply because it was close to home. He was head coach from 1973 to 1982, winning the Great Lakes Conference title and the NAIA District 23 Championship twice each.

Regan's work at Grand Valley earned him a call from Seattle Mariners general manager Dan O'Brien Sr. After spending the 1983 season as the Mariners' minor league pitching instructor and advance scout, Regan was promoted to major league pitching coach in 1984. His tenure in Seattle was interrupted by a two-game suspension in 1985 when he bumped umpire Derryl Cousins during a bench clearing brawl between the Mariners and California Angels on August 12.

Regan resigned from his position with the Mariners following the 1986 season. In 1987, he began a six-year stint with the Dodgers as their major league special assignment and advance scout. Regan was up for the Florida Marlins managerial job, late in 1992, but withdrew his name from consideration. A year later, he joined the Cleveland Indians as pitching coach during the strike-shortened 1994 season.

In 1995, Regan received his only major league managerial position, managing the Baltimore Orioles to a 71–73 record. Due to the 1994–95 Major League Baseball strike carrying into the 1995 season, the league played a shortened 144-game schedule that commenced on April 25. The Orioles missed the playoffs, ultimately finishing third in the American League East. After just one season at the helm, Regan was fired, and replaced by Davey Johnson.

The remainder of his professional coaching career:

- 1987–1989 – Managed Leones del Escogido to the Dominican Championship. Won the Caribbean World Series, in 1988.
- 1989–2009 – Managed teams in the Venezuelan Winter League, including Leones del Caracas, Navegantes del Magallanes, Cardenales de Lara, Bravos de Margarita, and Tiburones de La Guaira.
- 1996 – Managed Los Angeles Dodgers Triple-A affiliate Albuquerque Dukes (finished with a record of 67–76).
- 1997 – Served as Chicago Cubs pitching coach (1997–1998).
- 1999 – Served as Cleveland Indians pitching coach.
- 2000 – Served as Team USA pitching coach at Summer Olympics in Sydney.
- 2002 – Served as West Michigan Whitecaps manager (2002–2003).
- 2009–2015 – St. Lucie Mets pitching coach.
- 2016–2019 – New York Mets minor league assistant pitching coordinator.
- 2019 – Promoted to New York Mets interim pitching coach on June 20 after Dave Eiland was fired. Retired following the season.
- 2019–2020 – Came out of retirement to become the Toros del Este pitching coach (won the Dominican Championship).

On February 21, 2023, Regan sued the Mets organization for age discrimination and wrongful termination for his departure as pitching coach following the 2019 season. The suit also alleged a harassment and a hostile work environment.

== Death ==
Regan died in Port St. Lucie, Florida, on July 8, 2026, at the age of 89.

== Managerial record ==
Team	Year	Regular season					Postseason			
Team	Year	Games	Won	Lost	Win %	Finish	Won	Lost	Win %	Result
BAL	1995	144	71	73	.493	3rd in AL East	–	–	–	–
Total		144	71	73	.493		0	0	–	

== See also ==
- The Sporting News Comeback Player of the Year Award
- The Sporting News Reliever of the Year Award
- List of Major League Baseball annual saves leaders

Sporting positions
Preceded by Frank Funk	Seattle Mariners Pitching Coach; 1984–1986	Succeeded by Billy Connors
Preceded by Rick Adair; Mark Wiley	Cleveland Indians Pitching Coach; 1994; 1999	Succeeded by Mark Wiley; Dick Pole
Preceded by Johnny Oates	Baltimore Orioles Manager; 1995	Succeeded by Davey Johnson
Preceded by Rick Dempsey	Albuquerque Dukes Manager; 1996	Succeeded by Glenn Hoffman
Preceded by Ferguson Jenkins	Chicago Cubs Pitching Coach; 1997–1998	Succeeded by Marty DeMerritt
Preceded by Dave Eiland	New York Mets Pitching Coach; 2019	Succeeded by Jeremy Hefner
