= 1990 Caribbean Series =

1990 baseball tournament

The thirty-second edition of the Caribbean Series (Serie del Caribe) was played in 1990. It was held from February 2 through February 7 with the champions teams from the Dominican Republic, Leones del Escogido; Mexico, Naranjeros de Hermosillo; Puerto Rico, Senadores de San Juan, and Venezuela, Leones del Caracas. The format consisted of 12 games, each team facing the other teams twice, and was played at Miami Orange Bowl in Miami, Florida.

== Summary ==
The four-team, round-robin tournament was brought to Miami after it ran into dire economic woes in Caribbean countries. In a botched experiment, the Series games were played in the now defunct Orange Bowl, which had not been used for baseball since 1956, when the legendary Satchel Paige pitched there in an exhibition game.

According to series organizers, the facility was chosen because of its proximity to the city's Latin community. But because of the way it was built, the Orange Bowl was not suitable for baseball. As a result, makeshift conditions in the old ballpark led to poor infield play, which was pockmarked and worn down from use during a recent soccer tournament. Since the start, there had been numerous bad hops and infielders were visibly shying away from ground balls, resulting in high scoring games. In addition, players and managers were annoyed at the park's dimensions. It was only 250 feet down the left-field line, according to Series officials, but those who played on it believe it was closer to 220 feet.

The Dominican Leones del Escogido won the competition with a 5–1 record and were managed by Felipe Alou. The club got a fine offensive performance from outfielder and Series MVP Gerónimo Berroa, who hit .300 with four home runs and eight runs batted in, including two homers and five RBI in the decisive game against the Senadores de San Juan of Puerto Rico, who tied for second with the Leones del Caracas of Venezuela.

The last-place Naranjeros de Hermosillo finished with a 1–5 record, but included batting champion Cornelio García (.520) and catcher Homar Rojas in the All-Star team. In addition, Barry Jones of Puerto Rico smashed five home runs to tie the single-series record set by Rico Carty in the 1977 tournament. A left-handed pull hitter, Jones achieved the feat easily, thanks to the controversial shortened left-field fence required by the patchwork Orange Bowl diamond.

A record of 48 home runs were hit in the Series, to surpass the mark of 30 homers set in the 1987 edition. Meanwhile, despite a crowd of 9,790 on opening night, the total attendance for the twelve-game tournament was less than 50,000, the worst in Series history.

== Final standings ==
Country	Club	W	L	W/L %	Managers
Dominican Republic	Leones del Escogido	5	1	.833	Felipe Alou
Venezuela	Leones del Caracas	3	3	.500	Phil Regan
Puerto Rico	Senadores de San Juan	3	3	.500	Mako Oliveras
Mexico	Naranjeros de Hermosillo	1	5	.167	Tim Johnson

== Individual leaders ==
Player	Statistic
Batting
Cornelio García (MEX)	Batting average	.520
Barry Jones (PUR)	Home runs	5
Gerónimo Berroa (DOM)	RBI	8
Pitching
Mel Rojas (DOM)	Wins	2

== All-Star Team ==
Name	Position
Homar Rojas (MEX)	Catcher
Héctor Villanueva (PUR)	First baseman
Nelson Liriano (DOM)	Second baseman
Edgar Martínez (PUR)	Third baseman
Omar Vizquel (VEN)	Shortstop
Cornelio García (MEX)	Left fielder
Moisés Alou (DOM)	Center fielder
Raúl Pérez Tovar (VEN)	Right fielder
Rufino Linares (DOM)	Designated hitter
Doug Linton (VEN)	Pitcher
Awards
Gerónimo Berroa (DOM)	Most Valuable Player
Felipe Alou (DOM)	Manager

== See also ==
- Ballplayers who have played in the Series

== Sources ==
- Nuñez, José Antero (1994). Serie del Caribe de la Habana a Puerto La Cruz. JAN Editor. ISBN 980-07-2389-7
- Bjarman, Peter (1994). Baseball with a Latin Beat : A History of the Latin American Game. McFarland & Company. ISBN 978-0-89-950973-0
