= José Núñez =

José Núñez may refer to:

- José Ariel Núñez (born 1988), Paraguayan international footballer
- Joe Núñez (José Cleto Nuñez) (1937–2020), American politician
- José María Núñez Piossek (born 1976), Argentine rugby union footballer
- José Núñez de Cáceres (1772–1846), Dominican revolutionary and writer
- Jose Nuñez (DJ), American electronic- and house music producer
- José Núñez (footballer) (born 1952), Spanish professional football manager and player
- José Núñez (left-handed pitcher) (born 1979), American MLB pitcher
- José Núñez (right-handed pitcher) (born 1964), American MLB pitcher
- José Núñez-Melo (born 1956), Canadian politician
- José Núñez (politician) (1800–1880), Nicaraguan politician and doctor
