= 1998 Caribbean Series =

1998 baseball tournament

The fortieth edition of the Caribbean Series (Serie del Caribe) was held from February 4 through February 10 of 1998 with the champion baseball teams of the Dominican Republic, Águilas Cibaeñas; Mexico, Venados de Mazatlán; Puerto Rico, Indios de Mayagüez, and Venezuela, Cardenales de Lara. The format consisted of 12 games, each team facing the other teams twice, and the games were played at Estadio Alfonso Chico Carrasquel in Puerto la Cruz, Anzoátegui, Venezuela.

== Final standings ==
Country	Club	W	L	W/L %	Managers
Dominican Republic	Águilas Cibaeñas	6	0	1.000	Tony Peña
Puerto Rico	Indios de Mayagüez	4	2	.667	Tom Gamboa
Mexico	Venados de Mazatlán	1	5	.167	Raúl Cano
Venezuela	Cardenales de Lara	1	5	.167	Omar Malavé

== Individual leaders ==
Player	Statistic
Batting
Neifi Pérez (DOM)	Batting average	.444
Neifi Pérez (DOM)	Runs	10
Neifi Pérez (DOM)	Hits	12
Neifi Pérez (DOM)	Doubles	6
Tony Barron (PUR)	Triples	2
José Hernández (PUR)	Home runs	4
José Hernández (PUR)	RBI	8
Four players tied	Stolen bases	2
Pitching
Twelve players tied	Wins	1
Julio Valera (PUR)	Strikeouts	11
Julián Tavárez (DOM)	ERA	0.00
Julián Tavárez (DOM)	Innings pitched	12.0
José Cabrera (DOM)	Saves	3

== All-Star team ==
Name	Position
Guillermo García (DOM)	Catcher
Alex Arias (DOM)	First baseman
Neifi Pérez (DOM)	Second baseman
Miguel Tejada (DOM)	Third baseman
José Hernández (PUR)	Shortstop
Luis Polonia (DOM)	Left fielder
Darryl Brinkley (MEX)	Center fielder
Magglio Ordóñez (VEN)	Right fielder
Pedro Muñoz (PUR)	Designated hitter
Julián Tavárez (DOM)	Right-handed pitcher
Dennys Reyes (MEX)	Left-handed pitcher
José Cabrera (DOM)	Relief pitcher
Awards
Neifi Pérez (DOM)	Most Valuable Player
Tony Peña (DOM)	Manager

== Sources ==
- Bjarkman, Peter. Diamonds around the Globe: The Encyclopedia of International Baseball. Greenwood. ISBN 978-0-313-32268-6
- Serie del Caribe : History, Records and Statistics (Spanish)
