= 2016 Caribbean Series =

2016 baseball tournament

The 2016 Caribbean Series (Serie del Caribe) is the 58th edition of the international competition featuring the champions of the Cuban National Series, Dominican Professional Baseball League, Mexican Pacific League, Puerto Rican Professional Baseball League, and Venezuelan Professional Baseball League. It took place February 1–7 at Estadio Quisqueya in Santo Domingo, Dominican Republic. The teams played a ten-game round robin, followed by the semifinals and championship game.

For the first time, the tournament featured a home run derby, however Major League Baseball players were barred from participating due to complaints from Major League Baseball Players Association over injury risks.

== Round robin ==
=== Schedule ===
Time zone Atlantic Standard Time (UTC–4)

Date	Time	Away	Result	Home	Stadium
February 1	14:00	Cangrejeros de Santurce (Puerto Rico)	1–2	(Venezuela) Tigres de Aragua	Estadio Quisqueya
February 1	20:00	Venados de Mazatlán (Mexico)	3–2	(Dominican Republic) Leones de Escogido	Estadio Quisqueya
February 2	15:30	Tigres de Ciego de Ávila (Cuba)	3–9	(Mexico) Venados de Mazatlán	Estadio Quisqueya
February 2	19:50	Leones de Escogido (Dominican Republic)	7–8 (10)	(Venezuela) Tigres de Aragua	Estadio Quisqueya
February 3	15:30	Tigres de Aragua (Venezuela)	4–6	(Mexico) Venados de Mazatlán	Estadio Quisqueya
February 3	19:50	Cangrejeros de Santurce (Puerto Rico)	12–1	(Cuba) Tigres de Ciego de Ávila	Estadio Quisqueya
February 4	15:30	Tigres de Aragua (Venezuela)	3–1	(Cuba) Tigres de Ciego de Ávila	Estadio Quisqueya
February 4	19:50	Leones de Escogido (Dominican Republic)	1–2 (14)	(Puerto Rico) Cangrejeros de Santurce	Estadio Quisqueya
February 5	15:30	Venados de Mazatlán (Mexico)	8–4	(Puerto Rico) Cangrejeros de Santurce	Estadio Quisqueya
February 5	19:00	Tigres de Ciego de Ávila (Cuba)	4–2 (11)	(Dominican Republic) Leones de Escogido	Estadio Quisqueya

=== Standings ===
Pos	Team	G	W	L	PCT	GB	RS	RA	RD	H–H	TQB
1	(Mexico) Venados de Mazatlán	4	4	0	1.000	–	26	13	13		
2	(Venezuela) Tigres de Aragua	4	3	1	.750	1	17	15	2		
3	(Puerto Rico) Cangrejeros de Santurce	4	2	2	.500	2	19	12	7		
4	(Cuba) Tigres de Ciego de Ávila	4	1	3	.250	3	9	26	–17		
5	(Dominican Republic) Leones de Escogido	4	0	4	.000	4	12	17	–5		

== Playoff round ==
Semifinals
3	(Puerto Rico) Cangrejeros de Santurce	3
2	(Venezuela) Tigres de Aragua	13
4	(Cuba) Tigres de Ciego de Ávila	2
1	(Mexico) Venados de Mazatlán	7

Finals
(Venezuela) Tigres de Aragua	4
(Mexico) Venados de Mazatlán	5

=== Semifinals ===
Date	Time	Away	Result	Home	Stadium
February 6	15:30	Cangrejeros de Santurce (Puerto Rico)	3–13	(Venezuela) Tigres de Aragua	Estadio Quisqueya
February 6	19:50	Tigres de Ciego de Ávila (Cuba)	2–7	(Mexico) Venados de Mazatlán	Estadio Quisqueya

=== Final ===
Date	Time	Away	Result	Home	Stadium
February 7	16:00	Tigres de Aragua (Venezuela)	4–5	(Mexico) Venados de Mazatlán	Estadio Quisqueya
