= 2015 Caribbean Series =

Caribbean championship baseball

The 2015 Caribbean Series (Serie del Caribe) was the 57th edition of the international competition featuring the champions of the Cuban National Series, Dominican Professional Baseball League, Mexican Pacific League, Puerto Rican Professional Baseball League, and Venezuelan Professional Baseball League. It took place February 2–8 at Hiram Bithorn Stadium in San Juan, Puerto Rico. The teams played a ten-game round robin, followed by the semifinals and championship game.

== Round robin ==
=== Schedule ===
Time zone Atlantic Standard Time (UTC–4)

Date	Time	Away	Result	Home	Stadium
February 2	13:05	Vegueros de Pinar del Río	1–2	Tomateros de Culiacán	Hiram Bithorn
February 2	19:30	Caribes de Anzoátegui	5–2	Cangrejeros de Santurce	Hiram Bithorn
February 3	13:05	Vegueros de Pinar del Río	1–6	Gigantes del Cibao	Hiram Bithorn
February 3	19:30	Cangrejeros de Santurce	2–3	Tomateros de Culiacán	Hiram Bithorn
February 4	13:05	Gigantes del Cibao	5–6	Caribes de Anzoátegui	Hiram Bithorn
February 4	19:30	Cangrejeros de Santurce	2–3 (10)	Vegueros de Pinar del Río	Hiram Bithorn
February 5	13:05	Caribes de Anzoátegui	6–2	Vegueros de Pinar del Río	Hiram Bithorn
February 5	19:30	Tomateros de Culiacán	2–3	Gigantes del Cibao	Hiram Bithorn
February 6	13:05	Tomateros de Culiacán	2–4	Caribes de Anzoátegui	Hiram Bithorn
February 6	19:30	Gigantes del Cibao	2–3	Cangrejeros de Santurce	Hiram Bithorn

=== Standings ===
Pos	Team	G	W	L	PCT	GB	RS	RA	RD	H–H	TQB
1	(Venezuela) Caribes de Anzoátegui	4	4	0	1.000	–	21	11	10		
2	(Dominican Republic) Gigantes del Cibao	4	2	2	.500	2	16	12	4	1–0	
3	(Mexico) Tomateros de Culiacán	4	2	2	.500	2	9	10	–1	0–1	
4	(Cuba) Vegueros de Pinar del Río	4	1	3	.250	3	7	16	–9	1–0	
5	(Puerto Rico) Cangrejeros de Santurce	4	1	3	.250	3	9	13	–4	0–1	

== Playoff round ==
Semifinals
3	(Mexico) Tomateros de Culiacán	5
2	(Dominican Republic) Gigantes del Cibao	4
4	(Cuba) Vegueros de Pinar del Río	8
1	(Venezuela) Caribes de Anzoátegui	4

Finals
(Mexico) Tomateros de Culiacán	2
(Cuba) Vegueros de Pinar del Río	3

=== Semifinals ===
Date	Time	Away	Result	Home	Stadium
February 7	13:05	Tomateros de Culiacán (Mexico)	5–4	(Dominican Republic) Gigantes del Cibao	Hiram Bithorn
February 7	19:30	Vegueros de Pinar del Río (Cuba)	8–4	(Venezuela) Caribes de Anzoátegui	Hiram Bithorn

=== Final ===
Date	Time	Away	Result	Home	Stadium
February 8	17:30	Vegueros de Pinar del Río (Cuba)	3–2	Tomateros de Culiacán (Mexico)	Hiram Bithorn
