= Bobby Wine =

American baseball player and manager (born 1938)

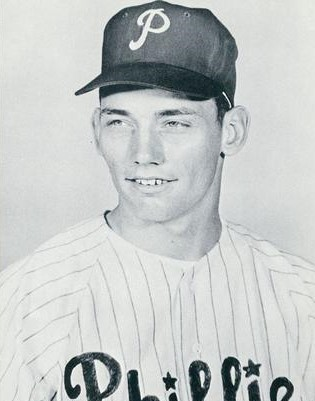
- Shortstop / Manager
- Born: September 17, 1938 (age 88); New York City, New York, U.S.
- Batted: Right Threw: Right

MLB debut
- September 20, 1960, for the Philadelphia Phillies

Last MLB appearance
- July 8, 1972, for the Montreal Expos

MLB statistics
- Batting average: .215
- Home runs: 30
- Runs batted in: 268
- Managerial record: 16–25
- Winning %: .390
- Stats at Baseball Reference
- Managerial record at Baseball Reference

Teams
- As player: Philadelphia Phillies (1960, 1962–1968); Montreal Expos (1969–1972); As manager: Atlanta Braves (1985); As coach: Philadelphia Phillies (1972–1983); Atlanta Braves (1985, 1989–1990); New York Mets (1993–1996)

Career highlights and awards
- World Series champion (1980); Gold Glove Award (1963)

Robert Paul Wine Sr. (born September 17, 1938) is an American former shortstop, coach and manager in Major League Baseball (MLB). An excellent fielder who struggled as a hitter, Wine spent 12 seasons in the National League with the Philadelphia Phillies (1960; 1962–68) and the Montreal Expos (1969–72). He won the NL Gold Glove Award in 1963.

== Playing career ==
=== Minor leagues ===
Before the 1957 season, Wine was signed by the Philadelphia Phillies as an amateur free agent out of Northport High School. His first season of professional baseball would see him with the class D Appalachian League (Short Season) Johnson City Phillies. The 18-year-old infielder appeared in 54 games, got 202 at bats, 68 hits—including 6 home runs—and hit for a .337 average.

Wine moved up to the class C California League Bakersfield Bears in 1958. Bobby appeared in 112 games, got 440 at bats, had 137 hits with 11 home runs, and hit for a .311 average. 1959 would find him with the class A Eastern League Williamsport Grays, playing in 120 contests, getting 426 at bats, but only 89 hits and his batting average fell to .209.

=== First taste of the majors ===
Wine played with the International League Buffalo Bisons in 1960, appearing in 154 games with 569 at bats and 153 hits for a .269 average. He recorded a .958 fielding percentage at the shortstop position. He made his major league debut that season, when the Philadelphia Phillies used him in 4 games. He picked up 2 base hits and fielded 19 total chances at shortstop without an error for a 1.000 percentage.

=== Back to the minors ===
In 1961 he was back with the Buffalo team where he hit for a .243 average and fielded at a .961 clip. He also spent time in 1962 with Buffalo, hitting .242 and fielding at a .977 percentage. This was his last minor league action, as he finished out the year with the Phillies, hitting at a .244 average and fielding .979. He played 20 games at third base in 1962 for the Philadelphia team and did not have an error.

=== In the majors to stay ===
Wine spent the next ten seasons (1963–1972) in the major leagues. Wine was with the memorable 1964 Philadelphia team, which was in first place most of the year but collapsed in the last two weeks to let the St. Louis Cardinals take the pennant on the last day of the season. He played shortstop during the late innings of Jim Bunning's perfect game against the New York Mets on Father's Day of that year. His last season with the Phillies was 1968, when a back injury limited him to 27 games.

Wine was sent to the expansion Montreal Expos at the end of spring training in 1969 as compensation for pitcher Larry Jackson, who had been selected from the Phillies in the 1969 expansion draft but chose to retire rather than join the Expos. At first he was the back-up to Maury Wills, but he took over when Wills was traded to the Los Angeles Dodgers in June 1969. Although he played in just 121 games, Wine led the league in errors with 31, and batted just .200.

In the 1970 season, Bobby was 5th in the league in games played with 159 to his credit. He participated in a then-record 137 double plays in 1970. While his hitting was still awful, with no power to speak of, he registered his best batting average of his tenure with the Expos at .232. He also posted the best on-base percentage of his career, a paltry .287. Despite the low averages, Wine showed prowess to hit in the clutch, driving in 51 runs.

In 1971, Wine regressed to batting numbers even worse than 1969, including a career-worst .235 slugging average. Just before Opening Day of the 1972 season, the Expos acquired Tim Foli from the New York Mets, replacing Wine as the starter at shortstop. While he remained with Montreal as a back-up to Foli early in 1972, Wine played very little - he went to bat only 18 times in 34 games - as the more versatile Héctor Torres assumed the role of utility infielder. The Expos released him on July 10, ending his career.

=== Overview ===
Known for his strong arm, Wine rarely played enough, or enough full games, to accumulate high statistical totals. He was bothered by a bad back and missed most of the 1966 and 1968 seasons because of it. He had surgery for a ruptured spinal disc in 1968. However, he won the 1963 Gold Glove Award, led the NL in fielding in 1967, and, as mentioned above, he set a ML shortstop record with 137 double plays in 1970. That was in fact his only season with more than 420 at bats, as he had 501. His best batting average came in his rookie 1962 season, when he hit .244 in 311 at bats. His .215 lifetime average is the fourth-worst all-time with 2,500 or more at bats.

A jokester, "Wino" once pulled the Hidden ball trick on, of all people, Baseball Hall of Famer Willie Mays. When chided for his lack of home run power in his playing career, Wine has cracked, "That's OK. I had one more than Ashburn," referring to Richie Ashburn, the Phillies' Hall of Fame center fielder, who had 29 home runs in his career to Wine's 30. Five of Wine's 30 home runs came against Hall of Fame pitchers: two each off Juan Marichal and Warren Spahn and one off Bob Gibson.

== Coaching and managerial career ==
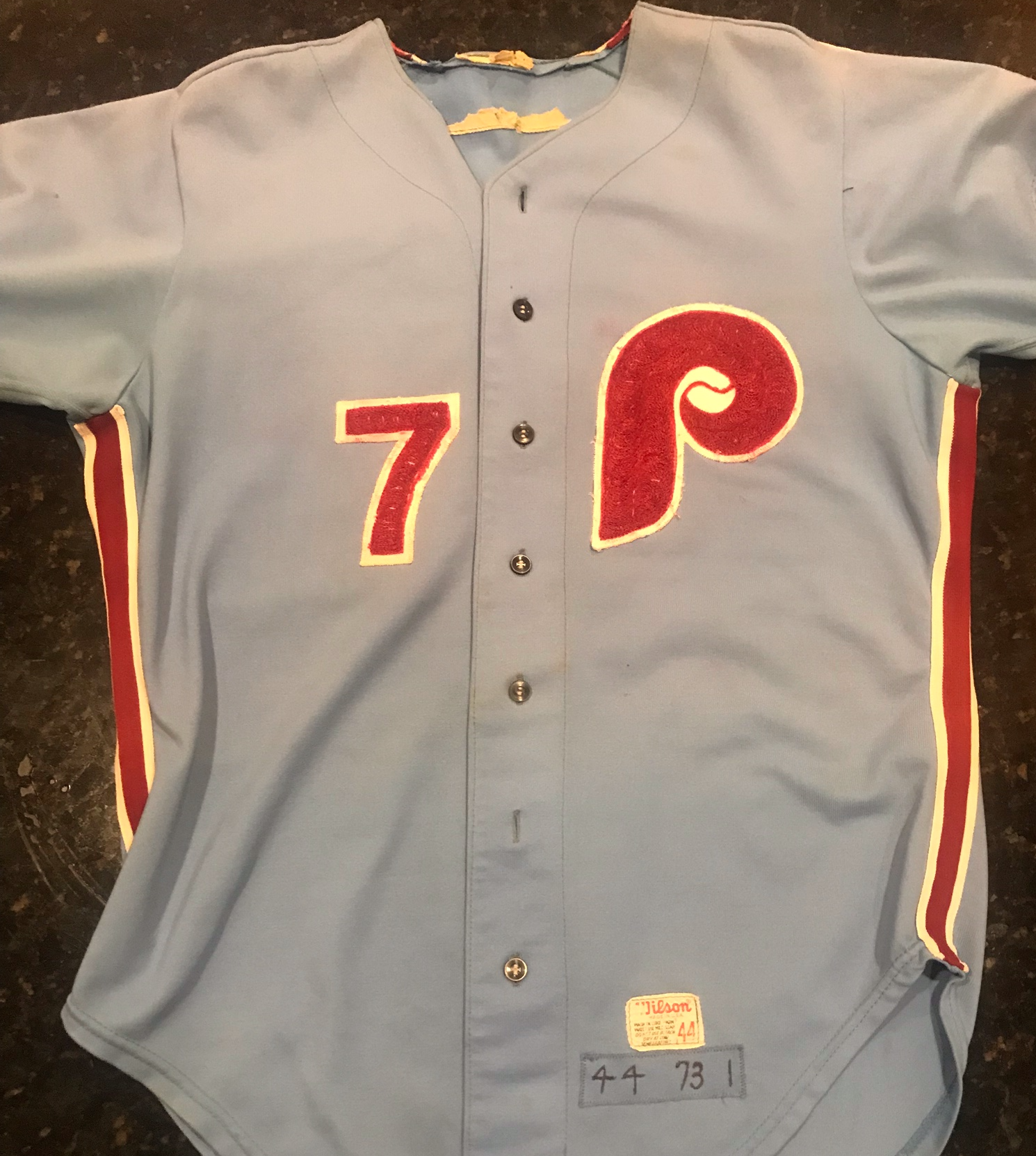
1973 Philadelphia Phillies #7 Bobby Wine game worn road jersey

Wine became a coach almost immediately after his playing days ended. He worked with the Phillies from July 1972 through the 1983 season — an era in which the Phils rebounded from cellar-dwellers to National League East Division champions from 1976 through 1978, National League champions in 1980 and 1983 and 1980 World Series champions.

After the 1979 season, it was reported that Wine was considered for manager of the big league club, a job that eventually was kept by interim manager Dallas Green. He remained with the Phillies as bench coach to Dallas Green and was an important factor in the Phillies winning their first ever World Series title in 1980. Wine stayed as bench coach until the 1983 season when manager Pat Corrales was fired at mid-season despite the team being in first place. Wine, thought by many to be the natural selection to ascend to manager, was not given the job but was in fact let go by the Phillies when general manager Paul Owens took over as manager.

He then moved to the Braves, serving as a coach in 1985. He was the interim manager of the 1985 Braves from August 26 through season's end, replacing the fired Eddie Haas. Under Wine, the Braves won 16 and lost 25 (.390) and remained lodged in fifth place in the National League West. Wine's last years in uniform were as a New York Mets coach from 1993 to 1996. In 1996, he was subjected to a very unusual ejection from a game due to not presenting the lineup card to the umpiring crew on time. After four seasons as a coach for the New York Mets, he was replaced by Bobby Valentine in 1996. The following year, in 1997, Wine returned to the Braves as the advance scout, reporting directly to Braves manager Bobby Cox. Cox retired from his position in 2010, with Wine following shortly after.

== Personal life ==
Wine lives with his wife, Fran, in Norristown, Pennsylvania. His son, Robbie Wine, is a former major league catcher for the Houston Astros and the former head baseball coach of the Penn State Nittany Lions. Wine was inducted into the Suffolk Sports Hall of Fame on Long Island in the Baseball Category with the Class of 1993. In 2007, Wine was inducted into the Pennsylvania Sports Hall of Fame. In 2009, his grandson, Cory Wine, was drafted by his former team, the Philadelphia Phillies, in the 38th round of the 2009 Major League Baseball draft.
