= 1988 Caribbean Series =

1988 baseball tournament

The thirtieth edition of the Caribbean Series (Serie del Caribe) was held from February 3 through February 8 of 1988 with the champion baseball teams of the Dominican Republic, Leones del Escogido; Mexico, Potros de Tijuana; Puerto Rico, Indios de Mayagüez, and Venezuela, Leones del Caracas. The format consisted of 12 games, each team facing the other teams twice, and the games were played at Estadio Quisqueya in Santo Domingo, Dominican Republic.

== Final standings ==
Country	Club	W	L	W/L %	Managers
Dominican Republic	Leones del Escogido	4	2	.667	Phil Regan
Puerto Rico	Indios de Mayagüez	3	3	.500	Jim Riggleman
Mexico	Potros de Tijuana	3	3	.500	Jorge Fitch
Venezuela	Leones del Caracas	2	4	.333	Bill Robinson

== Individual leaders ==
Player	Statistic
Batting
Tom Pagnozzi (PUR)	Batting average	.474
Bobby Bonilla (PUR); Houston Jiménez (MEX); Luis Polonia (DOM)	Runs	5
Tom Pagnozzi (PUR)	Hits	9
Houston Jiménez (MEX)	Doubles	4
Three tied	Triples	1
Tony Armas (VEN); Tom Pagnozzi (PUR)	Home runs	2
Nelson Barrera (MEX); Rufino Linares (DOM); Houston Jiménez (MEX)	RBI	5
Six tied	Stolen bases	1
Pitching
Twelve tied	Wins	1
José de León (DOM); Luis Encarnación (DOM)	ERA	0.00
Ramón de los Santos (DOM)	Saves	2

== All-Star team ==
Name	Position
Tom Pagnozzi (PUR)	Catcher
Stan Javier (DOM)	First baseman
Nelson Liriano (DOM)	Second baseman
Nelson Barrera (MEX)	Third baseman
Houston Jiménez (MEX)	Shortstop
Rufino Linares (DOM)	Left fielder
John Cangelosi (PUR)	Center fielder
Mike Ramsey (PUR)	Right fielder
Bobby Bonilla (PUR)	Designated hitter
José de León (DOM)	RH pitcher
Ramón de los Santos (DOM)	LH pitcher
Awards
Rufino Linares (DOM)	Most Valuable Player
Phil Regan (DOM)	Manager

== See also ==
- Ballplayers who have played in the Series

== Sources ==
- Nuñez, José Antero (1994). Serie del Caribe de la Habana a Puerto La Cruz. JAN Editor. ISBN 980-07-2389-7
