= 2019 Caribbean Series =

2019 baseball tournament

The 2019 Caribbean Series (Serie del Caribe) was the 61st edition of the international competition featuring the champions of the Cuban National Series, Dominican Professional Baseball League, Mexican Pacific League, Puerto Rican Professional Baseball League, Panamanian Professional Baseball League, and Venezuelan Professional Baseball League. It took place from February 4 to 10, 2019, at Estadio Nacional de Panamá in Panama City, Panama. The series was originally set to be hosted in Barquisimeto, Venezuela, but for the second consecutive year had to be moved to an alternate location. This was due primarily to security concerns stemming from the 2019 Venezuelan presidential crisis.

The Toros de Herrera won the tournament, becoming the first team from Panama to win since the Carta Vieja Yankees in 1950. It was Panama's first appearance in a Caribbean Series since 1960.

== Participating teams ==
Team	Means of qualification
(Cuba) Leñadores de Las Tunas	Winners of the 2018–19 Cuban National Series
(Mexico) Charros de Jalisco	Winners of the 2018–19 Mexican Pacific League
(Panama) Toros de Herrera	Winners of the 2018–19 Panamanian Professional Baseball League
(Puerto Rico) Cangrejeros de Santurce	Winners of the 2018–19 Puerto Rican Professional Baseball League
(Dominican Republic) Estrellas Orientales	Winners of the 2018–19 Dominican Professional Baseball League
(Venezuela) Cardenales de Lara	Winners of the 2018–19 Venezuelan Professional Baseball League

== Format ==
With the addition of a sixth team for the 2019 competition, two groups were formed with each composed of three teams. The groups had their Round-robin, with each team facing the others in their group twice. The teams with the best record from each group advanced to the Final.

== Round robin ==
Time zone Eastern Standard Time (UTC–5)

=== Group A ===
Pos	Team	Pld	W	L	RF	RA	RD	PCT	GB	Qualification
1	(Cuba) Leñadores de Las Tunas	4	2	2	8	5	+3	.500	—	Advance to the final
2	(Mexico) Charros de Jalisco	4	2	2	14	14	0	.500	—	
3	(Venezuela) Cardenales de Lara	4	2	2	10	13	−3	.500	—	

Source: MLB
Rules for classification: 1) Wins; 2) Head-to-head matches; 3) Team quality balance; 4) Batting average; 5) Drawing of lots.

Date	Time	Away	Result	Home	Stadium
February 4	20:00	Charros de Jalisco (Mexico)	1–5	(Venezuela) Cardenales de Lara	Estadio Rod Carew
February 5	15:00	Leñadores de Las Tunas (Cuba)	3–1	(Mexico) Charros de Jalisco	Estadio Rod Carew
February 6	15:00	Leñadores de Las Tunas (Cuba)	0–1	(Venezuela) Cardenales de Lara	Estadio Rod Carew
February 7	15:00	Charros de Jalisco (Mexico)	3–2 (11)	(Cuba) Leñadores de Las Tunas	Estadio Rod Carew
February 8	20:00	Cardenales de Lara (Venezuela)	4–9	(Mexico) Charros de Jalisco	Estadio Rod Carew
February 9	13:00	Cardenales de Lara (Venezuela)	0–3	(Cuba) Leñadores de Las Tunas	Estadio Rod Carew

=== Group B ===
Pos	Team	Pld	W	L	RF	RA	RD	PCT	GB	Qualification
1	(Panama) Toros de Herrera (H)	4	3	1	16	14	+2	.750	—	Advance to the final
2	(Dominican Republic) Estrellas Orientales	4	3	1	15	12	+3	.750	—	
3	(Puerto Rico) Cangrejeros de Santurce	4	0	4	12	17	−5	.000	3	

Source: MLB
Rules for classification: 1) Wins; 2) Head-to-head matches; 3) Team quality balance; 4) Batting average; 5) Drawing of lots.
(H) Hosts

Date	Time	Away	Result	Home	Stadium
February 4	15:00	Estrellas Orientales (Dominican Republic)	3–1	(Puerto Rico) Cangrejeros de Santurce	Estadio Rod Carew
February 5	20:00	Estrellas Orientales (Dominican Republic)	2–4	(Panama) Toros de Herrera	Estadio Rod Carew
February 6	20:00	Toros de Herrera (Panama)	8–7	(Puerto Rico) Cangrejeros de Santurce	Estadio Rod Carew
February 7	20:00	Cangrejeros de Santurce (Puerto Rico)	4–5	(Dominican Republic) Estrellas Orientales	Estadio Rod Carew
February 8	15:00	Toros de Herrera (Panama)	3–5	(Dominican Republic) Estrellas Orientales	Estadio Rod Carew
February 9	19:00	Cangrejeros de Santurce (Puerto Rico)	0–1	(Panama) Toros de Herrera	Estadio Rod Carew

== Final ==
Date	Time	Away	Result	Home	Stadium
February 10	16:00	Leñadores de Las Tunas (Cuba)	1–3	(Panama) Toros de Herrera	Estadio Rod Carew
