= Rufino Linares =

Dominican baseball player (1951–1998)

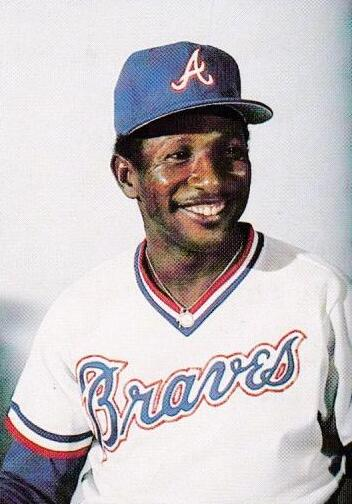
- Linares with the Atlanta Braves c. 1981
- Outfielder
- Born: February 28, 1951; San Pedro de Macorís, Dominican Republic
- Died: May 16, 1998 (aged 47); Santo Domingo, Dominican Republic
- Batted: Right Threw: Right

MLB debut
- April 10, 1981, for the Atlanta Braves

Last MLB appearance
- October 6, 1985, for the California Angels

MLB statistics
- Batting average: .270
- Home runs: 11
- Runs batted in: 63
- Stats at Baseball Reference

Teams
- Atlanta Braves (1981–1982, 1984); California Angels (1985)

Rufino de la Cruz Linares (February 28, 1951 – May 16, 1998) was a Dominican professional baseball player who played four seasons for the Atlanta Braves and California Angels of Major League Baseball.

Born in San Pedro de Macorís, Dominican Republic, Linares died in an automobile accident in Santo Domingo.
