= Naranjeros de Hermosillo =

Baseball team of the Mexican Pacific League based in Hermosillo, Sonora, Mexico

Logo	Cap insignia

Information
- League: Mexican Pacific League
- Location: Hermosillo, Sonora
- Ballpark: Estadio Fernando Valenzuela
- Founded: 1945
- Caribbean Series championships: 2 (1976, 2014)
- League championships: 17 (1960–61, 1961–62, 1963–64, 1970–71, 1974–75, 1975–76, 1979–80, 1981–82, 1989–90, 1991–92, 1993–94, 1994–95, 2000–01, 2006–07, 2009–10, 2013–14, 2023–24)
- Former name: Queliteros de Hermosillo (1945–1947)
- Former ballparks: Estadio Héctor Espino (1972–2013); Estadio Fernando M. Ortiz (1945–1971)
- Colors: Black, orange and white
- Retired numbers: 3; 6; 9; 10; 11; 14; 19; 20; 21; 23; 25; 30; 44
- Ownership: Club Deportivo Triple A, S.A. de C.V.
- President: Enrique Mazón Rubio
- Manager: Juan Gabriel Castro
- Website: www.naranjeros.com.mx (in Spanish)

Naranjeros de Hermosillo (English: Hermosillo Orange Growers) are a professional baseball team based in Hermosillo, Sonora, Mexico. They compete in the Mexican Pacific League (LMP). The team plays at Estadio Fernando Valenzuela with a capacity of 16,000 seated spectators.

The Naranjeros are one of the most successful teams in Mexican baseball and the most winning team in the Mexican Pacific League. They have won 17 LMP championships, the most recent during the 2023–24 season and two Caribbean Series titles. They were the first Mexico team to win the Caribbean Series, doing so in Santo Domingo, Dominican Republic in 1976.

== History ==
The team was established in 1945 as Queliteros de Hermosillo (English: Hermosillo Quelite Growers). In 1947, the Queliteros won their first championship in the Liga de la Costa del Pacífico (Pacific Coast League), the competition that preceded the Mexican Pacific League. The club changed its name to the current Naranjeros in the 50s and won the Pacific Coast League back to back in the 1955–56 and 1956–57 seasons. The Naranjeros played in the Estadio de la Casa del Pueblo that was later renamed to Estadio Fernando M. Ortiz.

Hermosillo repeated the feat of winning the league championship twice in a row in the 1960–61 and 1961–62 seasons, both times under manager Virgilio Arteaga. They won the league again in the 1963–64 season. During these years, legendary player Héctor Espino was part of the team.

The Naranjeros won the 1970–71 season and therefore became the first Pacific League team to represent Mexico in the 1971 Caribbean Series. In 1972 the team moved to the Estadio Coloso del Choyal. They won the 1974–75 and 1975–76 seasons back to back and participated in the 1976 Caribbean Series.

Naranjeros de Hermosillo when they were champions of the Caribbean Series in 1976

The Naranjeros' victory at the 1976 Caribbean Series in Santo Domingo was the first ever by a Mexican team. The club was managed by Benjamín "Cananea" Reyes and included players such as Héctor Espino (1B), Sergio "Kalimán" Robles (C), Celerino Sánchez (3B), Elliot Willis (2B), Arnoldo de Hoyos (CF), George Brunett (P) and Jerry Hairston Sr. (LF). Again under Cananea Reyes, the Naranjeros won the 1979–80 season. With Tom Harmon as manager, Hermosillo won the 1981–82, 1989–90 and 1991–92 seasons.

In the 1993–94, 1994–95 and 2000–01 seasons, the Naranjeros won the Mexican Pacific League, led by manager Derek Bryant. Under Lorenzo Bundy, Hermosillo won the 2006–07 season and were champions again in the 2009–10 season with Homar Rojas as manager.

In 2013, the Naranjeros moved to Estadio Sonora. During that season, the team won its seventeenth league title and the 2014 Caribbean Series with Matías Carrillo as manager defeating Indios de Mayagüez 7–1 in the final.

Ten years later, the Naranjeros won its eighteenth LMP championship in the 2023–24 under manager Juan Gabriel Castro, sweeping the Venados de Mazatlán 4–0 in the championship series. The team represented Mexico at the 2024 Caribbean Series played in Miami. The Naranjeros finished sixth with a 2–4 record, managing to defeat Tigres del Licey and Gigantes de Rivas, but losing their other four games, thus, being eliminated in the first round of the tournament.

== Stadium ==
In its early days, the team played at Estadio Fernando M. Ortiz, also known as "La Casa del Pueblo." Since 1972, the Naranjeros played in their home stadium, Estadio De Beisbol Héctor Espino, named after the greatest Mexican baseball player in history, Héctor Espino. Since 2013 they have played their home games at Estadio Fernando Valenzuela, which was called Estadio Sonora until 2023.

== Roster ==
Naranjeros de Hermosillo roster
Active roster		Coaches
Pitchers: 54 (Mexico) Raúl Barrón; 53 (United States) Paul Campbell; 86 (Mexico) Enrique Castillo; 80 (United States) Matt Foster; 29 (Mexico) Luis Márquez; 49 (Brazil) Daniel Missaki; 94 (Mexico) Rolando Mora; 58 (Mexico) Alan Rangel; 42 (United States) Sean Reid-Foley; 2 (Mexico) Wilmer Ríos; 59 (Mexico) Fernando Salas; 55 (Mexico) José Samaoya; 88 (United States) Touki Toussaint	Catchers: 12 (Mexico) Sergio Burruel; 70 (Mexico) Gabriel Gutiérrez; 51 (Mexico) César Salazar; 97 (Mexico) Andrés Sosa; Infielders: 7 (Mexico) Jasson Atondo; 37 (United States) Willie Calhoun; 95 (Mexico) Elvin Carrillo; 24 (Mexico) Diego Galué; 77 (Mexico) Edson García; 50 (Mexico) Agustín Murillo; 17 (Mexico) Isaac Paredes; 8 (United States) Milan Tolentino; Outfielders: 33 (Mexico) José Cardona; 13 (United States) Todd Lott; 66 (Mexico) Brayan Mendoza; 74 (Mexico) Ángel Ramírez; 43 (Colombia) Harold Ramírez	Manager: 27 (Mexico) Juan Gabriel Castro; Coaches: 63 (Mexico) Jesús Arredondo (third base); 31 (Mexico) Juan Carlos Canizales (batting); 45 (Mexico) Elmer Dessens (pitching); 32 (Mexico) Héctor Estrada (bench coach); 23 (Mexico) Cornelio García (first base); 5 (Mexico) Carlos Gastélum (infield); 38 (Mexico) Isidro Márquez (bullpen); 16 (Mexico) Alfredo Meza (catchers); Roster updated on 22 December 2025

=== Retired numbers ===
The Naranjeros de Hermosillo have retired the following numbers:

José Luis; Sandoval; SS; 1991–2011; Retired; 21 December 2013	Sergio; Robles; C 1967–1986; Retired; 9 November 2006	Vinicio; Castilla; 3B; 2000–2011; Retired; 9 December 2012	Cananea; Reyes; Manager; 1974–1980; Retired; 8 November 1992	Francisco; Barrios; P 1971–1982; Retired; 12 September 2020	Celerino; Sánchez; 3B; 1966–1978; Retired; 24 November 1993	Miguel; Sotelo; P 1958–1967; Retired; 20 November 2006
Miguel; Flores; 2B; 1991–2001; Retired; 6 November 2019	Héctor; Espino; 1B; 1961–1985; Retired; 29 November 1987	Cornelio; García; 1B; 1985–2005; Retired; 13 November 2009	Maximino; León; P 1970–1989; Retired; 1 November 2000	Ángel; Moreno; P 1980–1985; Retired; 26 November 2003	Erubiel; Durazo; 1B; 1996–2009; Retired; 2 December 2018	

== Championships ==
Season	Manager	Opponent	Series score	Record
1960–61	Virgilio Arteaga	No final series		35–19
1961–62	Virgilio Arteaga	No final series		39–21
1963–64	Leonardo Rodríguez	No final series		47–33
1970–71	Maury Wills	Cañeros de Los Mochis	3–1	68–35
1974–75	Cananea Reyes	Mayos de Navojoa	4–0	58–34–3
1975–76	Cananea Reyes	Yaquis de Obregón	4–3	57–40
1979–80	Cananea Reyes	Tomateros de Culiacán	4–2	63–29
1981–82	Tom Harmon	Águilas de Mexicali	4–3	62–41
1989–90	Tim Johnson	Mayos de Navojoa	4–1	60–27
1991–92	Tim Johnson	Mayos de Navojoa	4–1	46–39–3
1993–94	Marv Foley	Mayos de Navojoa	4–0	49–36
1994–95	Derek Bryant	Tomateros de Culiacán	4–2	40–33
2000–01	Derek Bryant	Venados de Mazatlán	4–1	52–31
2006–07	Lorenzo Bundy	Venados de Mazatlán	4–0	53–30
2009–10	Homar Rojas	Venados de Mazatlán	4–3	53–31
2013–14	Matías Carrillo	Mayos de Navojoa	4–3	54–33
2023–24	Juan Gabriel Castro	Venados de Mazatlán	4–0	59–22
Total championships			17	

== Caribbean Series record ==
Year	Venue	Finish	Wins	Losses	Win%	Manager
1971	(Puerto Rico) San Juan	2nd	2	4	.333	(United States) Maury Wills
1975	(Puerto Rico) San Juan	3rd	3	3	.500	(Mexico) Cananea Reyes
1976	(Dominican Republic) Santo Domingo / Santiago	1st	5	1	.833	(Mexico) Cananea Reyes
1980	(Dominican Republic) Santo Domingo	4th	2	4	.333	(Mexico) Cananea Reyes
1982	(Mexico) Hermosillo	4th	2	4	.333	(United States) Tom Harmon
1990	(United States) Miami	4th	1	5	.167	(United States) Tim Johnson
1992	(Mexico) Hermosillo	3rd	3	3	.500	(United States) Tim Johnson
1994	(Venezuela) Puerto la Cruz	4th	0	6	.000	(United States) Marv Foley
1995	(Puerto Rico) San Juan	3rd	1	5	.167	(United States) Derek Bryant
2001	(Mexico) Culiacán	2nd	3	3	.500	(United States) Derek Bryant
2007	(Puerto Rico) Carolina	4th	1	5	.167	(United States) Lorenzo Bundy
2010	(Venezuela) Margarita Island	3rd	2	4	.333	(Mexico) Homar Rojas
2014	(Venezuela) Margarita Island	1st	4	2	.667	(Mexico) Matías Carrillo
2024	(United States) Miami	6th	2	4	.333	(Mexico) Juan Gabriel Castro
Total			31	53	.369	

== Notable players ==
- (Mexico) Alfredo Aceves
- (Mexico) Ramón Arano
- (Mexico) Francisco Barrios
- (United States) George Brunet
- (Mexico) Vinicio Castilla
- (Mexico) Jorge de la Rosa
- (Mexico) Elmer Dessens
- (Mexico) Erubiel Durazo
- (Mexico) Narciso Elvira
- (Mexico) Héctor Espino
- (Mexico) Luis Garcia
- (Mexico) Daniel Garibay
- (Mexico) Carlos Gastélum
- (Mexico) Édgar González
- (United States) Jerry Hairston Sr.
- (United States) Rich Hinton
- (United States) Trenidad Hubbard
- (United States) Al Martin
- (Mexico) Maximino León
- (Mexico) Mario Mendoza
- (Mexico) Ángel Moreno
- (United States) Jerry Owens
- (Panama) Rubén Rivera
- (Mexico) Chris Roberson
- (Mexico) Sergio Robles
- (Mexico) Homar Rojas
- (United States) Gary Ross
- (Mexico) Celerino Sánchez
- (Cuba) Yunesky Sánchez
- (United States) Curt Schilling
- (United States) Dave Sells
- (Mexico) Miguel Sotelo
- (United States) Robert Stock
- (Mexico) Alex Treviño
- (Mexico) Fernando Valenzuela
- (Mexico) Sebastián Valle
- (Canada) Larry Walker
- (United States) Jon Weber
- (United States) Zelous Wheeler
- (United States) Bump Wills
- (United States) Maury Wills
- (United States) Jim Wilson
