= List of Major League Baseball players from Mexico =

This is an alphabetical list of 153 baseball players from Mexico who played Major League Baseball between 1933 and 2026.

== Active players ==
Player	Position	Debut	Team(s)	Notes
Luis Gastélum	RHP	July 8, 2026	St. Louis Cardinals (2026–present)	
Samy Natera Jr.	LHP	June 6, 2026	Los Angeles Angels (2026–present)	
Brandon Valenzuela	C	April 5, 2026	Toronto Blue Jays (2026–present)	
Alejandro Osuna	OF	May 25, 2025	Texas Rangers (2025–present)	
Valente Bellozo	RHP	June 26, 2024	Miami Marlins (2024–present)	
Jonathan Aranda	IF	June 24, 2022	Tampa Bay Rays (2022–present)	All-Star (2025); Member of the Mexico national baseball team for the 2023 World Baseball Classic
Javier Assad	RHP	August 23, 2022	Chicago Cubs (2022–present)	Member of the Mexico national baseball team for the 2023 World Baseball Classic
Alejandro Kirk	C	September 12, 2020	Toronto Blue Jays (2020–present)	2× All-Star (2022, 2025); Silver Slugger Award (2022)
Isaac Paredes	3B	August 17, 2020	Detroit Tigers (2020–2021); Tampa Bay Rays (2022–2024); Chicago Cubs (2024); Houston Astros (2025–present)	2× All-Star (2024, 2025); Member of the Mexico national baseball team for the 2023 World Baseball Classic
Alan Rangel	RHP	June 6, 2025	Philadelphia Phillies (2025–present)	
Ramón Urías	IF	August 20, 2020	Diablos Rojos del México (2013–2017); Baltimore Orioles (2020–2025); Houston Astros (2025)	Gold Glove Award (2022)
Andrés Muñoz	RHP	July 12, 2019	San Diego Padres (2019); Seattle Mariners (2021–present)	2× All-Star (2024, 2025)
José Urquidy	RHP	July 2, 2019	Houston Astros (2019–2023); Detroit Tigers (2025)	World Series champion (2022); Member of the Mexico national baseball team for the 2023 World Baseball Classic

== A ==
- Juan Acevedo
- Alfredo Aceves
- Cy Acosta
- Miguel Aguilar
- Mel Almada
- Gabe Alvarez
- Tavo Álvarez
- Víctor Álvarez
- Rubén Amaro
- Alfredo Amézaga
- Jonathan Aranda
- Víctor Arano
- Javier Assad
- Beto Ávila
- Luis Ayala

== B ==
- Manny Banuelos
- Salomé Barojas
- Germán Barranca
- Francisco Barrios
- Valente Bellozo
- Rigo Beltrán
- Andrés Berumen

== C ==
- Jorge Campillo
- Matías Carrillo
- Humberto Castellanos
- Vinny Castilla
- Daniel Castro
- Juan Castro
- José Cecena
- Juan Cerros
- Luis Cessa
- Francisco Córdova
- David Cortés
- Humberto Cota
- Jesús Cruz
- Luis Cruz
- Omar Cruz

== D ==
- Jorge de la Rosa
- Miguel del Toro
- Elmer Dessens
- Daniel Duarte
- Germán Durán
- Erubiel Durazo

== E ==
- Narciso Elvira
- Chico Escárrega
- Francisco Estrada
- Marco Estrada

== F ==
- Héctor Fajardo
- Jesse Flores

== G ==
- Yovani Gallardo
- Giovanny Gallegos
- Chico García
- Jaime García
- Karim García
- Luis García
- Daniel Garibay
- Benji Gil
- Gerónimo Gil
- Chile Gómez
- Luis Gómez
- Édgar González
- Luis González
- Miguel González
- Victor González
- Bob Greenwood

== H ==
- Rudy Hernández
- Bobby Herrera
- Ted Higuera

== J ==
- Germán Jiménez
- Houston Jiménez

== K ==
- Alejandro Kirk

== L ==
- Arnold León
- Max León
- Esteban Loaiza
- Alejo López
- Arturo López
- Aurelio López
- Carlos López
- Irving Lopez
- Rodrigo López
- Memo Luna

== M ==
- Ever Magallanes
- Isidro Márquez
- Adrián Martinez
- Luis Alfonso Mendoza
- Mario Mendoza
- Joey Meneses
- Sid Monge
- Felipe Montemayor
- Andrés Mora
- Ángel Moreno
- Andrés Muñoz
- Noé Muñoz

== O ==
- Miguel Ojeda
- Jorge Orta
- Tirso Ornelas
- Alejandro Osuna
- Antonio Osuna
- Roberto Osuna

== P ==
- Vicente Palacios
- Isaac Paredes
- José Peña
- Ramiro Peña
- Óliver Pérez
- Tony Perezchica
- Horacio Piña
- Miguel Puente
- Alfonso Pulido

== Q ==
- Esteban Quiroz

== R ==
- Roberto Ramírez
- Alan Rangel
- Dennys Reyes
- Gerardo Reyes
- Armando Reynoso
- Ricardo Rincón
- Luis Rivera
- Óscar Robles
- Sergio Robles
- Aurelio Rodríguez
- Carlos Rodríguez
- Francisco Rodríguez
- Manuel Rodríguez
- Rosario Rodríguez
- Enrique Romo
- Vicente Romo
- Jorge Rubio

== S ==
- Fernando Salas
- César Salazar
- Celerino Sánchez
- Freddy Sandoval
- José Silva
- Walter Silva
- Alí Solís
- Marcelino Solis
- Joakim Soria

== T ==
- José Tolentino
- Héctor Torres
- Alex Treviño
- Bobby Treviño

== U ==
- Julio Urías
- Luis Urías
- Ramón Urías
- José Urquidy

== V ==
- Ismael Valdez
- Mario Valdez
- Benny Valenzuela
- Brandon Valenzuela
- Fernando Valenzuela
- César Vargas
- Guillermo Velasquez
- Héctor Velázquez
- Christian Villanueva
- Óscar Villarreal
