= 1975 Caribbean Series =

Eighteenth edition of baseball tournament; held in San Juan, Puerto Rico

The eighteenth edition of the Caribbean Series (Serie del Caribe) was played in 1975. It was held from February 1 through February 6 with the champions teams from the Dominican Republic, Águilas Cibaeñas; Mexico, Naranjeros de Hermosillo; Puerto Rico, Vaqueros de Bayamón and Venezuela, Tigres de Aragua. The format consisted of 12 games, each team facing the other teams twice, and was played at Hiram Bithorn Stadium in San Juan, Puerto Rico. For the first time in Series history, the designated hitter was adopted following the implementation of this rule by the American League during the 1973 MLB season.

== Summary ==
The Vaqueros de Bayamón of Puerto Rico clinched the Series and were managed by José Pagán. The team won five games in a row before falling to the Dominican Republic in the closing game, 5–4. Leading the offensive charge was RF Ken Griffey, Sr., who won the batting title with a .500 average (12-for-24) and scored the most runs in the tournament (eight). Meanwhile, 2B Félix Millán batted .435 (10-for-23) for the second best in the Series, and 1B Willie Montañez led all hitters in runs batted in (11) and tied for the most home runs (2), earning Most Valuable Player honors. Puerto Rico also had a well-balanced attack on offense including C Ellie Rodríguez, 3B Art Howe, SS Sergio Ferrer (SS), and OFs Orlando Álvarez, Jay Johnstone and Jerry Morales. The pitching staff was headed by John Montague, who hurled a four-hit shutout, and Tom Walker and Tom Hilgendorf, each winners in their respective starts. Other pitching contributions came from John Candelaria, Ed Figueroa, Jaime Navarro and Carlos Velázquez.

The Dominican Republic and Mexico teams shared second place with an identical record of 3–3 and took home a consolation prize.

The Águilas Cibaeñas, managed by Al Widmar, were heavily favored to win the title, mostly because of its obvious offensive power and the stellar Pittsburgh Pirates' double play combination of Frank Taveras (SS) and Rennie Stennett (2B). However, the pitching staff did not perform up to expectations, as is reflected in their run differential. While the team scored 33 runs (2nd best), the staff allowed 28 runs (the 2nd worst). Besides Taveras and Stennett, the team featured 1B Rafael Batista, RF Bobby Darwin, CF Miguel Diloné, 3B Winston Llenas and C Charlie Moore. Meantime, Joaquín Andújar (1–0) and Jim Slaton (1–0) were solid in two starts apiece, while Bill Castro (1–0) made four relief appearances.

The Naranjeros de Hermosillo, managed by Cananea Reyes, were a balanced squad that combined solid defense with good pitching and opportune hitting. The offense was clearly led by 1B Héctor Espino, OF Jerry Hairston, 2B Bump Wills and 3B Dave Hilton, while the top pitchers were Ed Acosta (1–0, 2.25 in two starts) and Dave Sells (2–0, 0.00 ERA in four relief appearances). Other players in the roster included C Sergio Robles and SS Mike Eden, as well as reliever Francisco Barrios. A noteworthy contribution came from OF/P Joe Pactwa, who made history when he became the first DH in Caribbean Series history (Game 1) and also the first DH to hit a home run (Game 4).

Venezuela, represented by the debuting Tigres de Aragua, was piloted by Ozzie Virgil, Sr. and finished last with a 1–5 record. Unlike Mexico, the Venezuelan club was characterized by poor batting, erratic defense and low pitching performance, being outscored by their opponents 45–14, while leading the tournament with 16 errors. The Tigres got their lone win from Jim Todd (1–1, 8.53) and Roberto Muñoz posted a solid 1.93 ERA, even though he dropped two games, while Milt Wilcox (0–1, 6.59) and Leon Hooten (0–0, 4.16) did hurt their own cause. Despite his low batting average (.250), RF Adrian Garrett, tied for the most home runs (2) and led the team in RBIs (7) and runs scored (4). Other contributions came from 1B Enos Cabell (.348), 3B Phil Garner (.318) and SS Dave Concepción (.280), on an otherwise weak offense that included CF Lyman Bostock (.174), 2B Duane Kuiper (.150) and C Tim Hosley (.125).

Final standings
Club	W	L	W/L %	GB	Manager
Puerto Rico	5	1	.833	–	José Pagán
Dominican Republic	3	3	.500	2.0	Al Widmar
Mexico	3	3	.500	2.0	Cananea Reyes
Venezuela	1	5	.167	4.0	Ozzie Virgil

Individual leaders
Player/Club	Statistic
Ken Griffey, Sr. / PUR	Batting average	.500
Ken Griffey, Sr. / PUR	Hits	12
Héctor Espino / MEX; Adrian Garrett / VEN; Willie Montañez / PUR	Home runs	2
Willie Montañez / PUR	Runs batted in	11
Dave Sells / MEX	Wins	2
John Montague / PUR	ERA	0.00
Awards
Willie Montañez / PUR	Most Valuable Player
José Pagán / PUR	Manager

All-Star Team
Name/Club	Position
Ellie Rodríguez / PUR	catcher
Willie Montañez / PUR	first baseman
Félix Millán / PUR	second baseman
Phil Garner / VEN	third baseman
Sergio Ferrer / PUR	shortstop
Jerry Hairston / MEX	left fielder
George Bell / DOM	center fielder
Ken Griffey, Sr. / PUR	right fielder
Orlando Álvarez / PUR	designated hitter
John Montague / PUR	RH pitcher
Tom Hilgendorf / PUR	LH pitcher
José Pagán / PUR	manager

=== Scoreboards ===
==== Game 1, February 1 ====
Team	1	2	3	4	5	6	7	8	9	R	H	E
Mexico	0	0	0	1	2	0	0	3	0	6	11	1
Dominican Republic	0	0	0	3	1	0	1	0	0	5	5	1
WP: Dave Sells (1–0) LP: Juan Jiménez (0–1); Home runs: MEX: Jerry Hairston (1); DOM: None; Notes: Mexico's Joe Pactwa became the first DH in Caribbean Series to enter the batter's box to bat, and was struck out by Dominican Republic starting pitcher Joaquín Andújar.

==== Game 2, February 1 ====
Team	1	2	3	4	5	6	7	8	9	R	H	E
Venezuela	0	1	0	1	0	0	0	0	0	2	6	5
Puerto Rico	6	0	1	0	5	0	0	0	x	12	15	2
WP: Ed Figueroa (1–0) LP: Jim Todd (0–1); Home runs: VEN: Adrian Garrett (1); PUR: Art Howe (1)

==== Game 3, February 2 ====
Team	1	2	3	4	5	6	7	8	9	10	R	H	E
Dominican Republic	0	1	0	0	0	3	0	0	0	5	9	10	3
Venezuela	0	0	4	0	0	0	0	0	0	0	4	6	3
WP: Jim Slaton (1–0) LP: Roberto Muñoz (0–1)

==== Game 4, February 2 ====
Team	1	2	3	4	5	6	7	8	9	R	H	E
Puerto Rico	0	1	0	4	0	0	0	0	1	6	13	2
Mexico	0	0	0	0	1	2	1	0	0	4	9	1
WP: Tom Walker (1–0) LP: Ramón Arano (0–1); Home runs: PUR: Willie Montañez (1); MEX: Joe Pactwa (1); Notes: * Puerto Rico's Ken Griffey, Sr. became the first player to collect five hits in a Caribbean Series game. * Mexico's Pactwa was the first DH to hit a homer in Series history

==== Game 5, February 3 ====
Team	1	2	3	4	5	6	7	8	9	R	H	E
Puerto Rico	1	0	1	0	1	0	0	2	1	6	12	1
Dominican Republic	0	0	0	0	2	0	0	1	1	4	8	0
WP: Tom Hilgendorf (1–0) LP: Jackie Brown (0–1) Sv: Carlos Velázquez (1); Home runs: PUR: None; DOM: Rafael Batista (1)

==== Game 6, February 3 ====
Team	1	2	3	4	5	6	7	8	9	R	H	E
Mexico	0	1	0	0	0	3	0	0	0	4	8	0
Venezuela	0	0	3	0	0	1	0	1	0	5	11	1
WP: Jim Todd (1–1) LP: Francisco Barrios (0–1); Home runs: MEX: Héctor Espino 2 (2); VEN: Adrian Garrett (2)

==== Game 7, February 4 ====
Team	1	2	3	4	5	6	7	8	9	R	H	E
Dominican Republic	0	1	0	2	0	0	0	0	0	3	7	1
Mexico	0	0	0	3	0	0	0	3	0	6	9	2
WP: Dave Sells (2–0) LP: Rick Waits (0–1)

==== Game 8, February 4 ====
Team	1	2	3	4	5	6	7	8	9	R	H	E
Puerto Rico	2	0	2	0	0	0	0	0	2	6	16	4
Venezuela	0	0	0	0	0	0	0	0	0	0	4	2
WP: John Montague (1–0) LP: Milt Wilcox (0–1); Home runs: PUR: Jay Johnstone (1), Ken Griffey, Sr. (1), Willie Montañez (2); VEN: None

==== Game 9, February 5 ====
Team	1	2	3	4	5	6	7	8	9	R	H	E
Venezuela	0	0	0	0	0	0	2	0	0	2	8	1
Dominican Republic	0	0	0	0	4	0	3	0	x	7	9	1
WP: Joaquín Andújar (1–0) LP: Roberto Muñoz (0–2)

==== Game 10, February 5 ====
Team	1	2	3	4	5	6	7	8	9	R	H	E
Mexico	0	3	1	0	0	0	0	0	0	4	5	2
Puerto Rico	0	0	1	0	0	0	4	0	x	5	10	4
WP: Fernando Vega (1–0) LP: Dave Sells (2–1)

==== Game 11, February 6 ====
Team	1	2	3	4	5	6	7	8	9	R	H	E
Venezuela	1	0	0	0	0	0	0	0	0	1	7	4
Mexico	0	2	0	0	0	0	3	0	x	5	7	2
WP: Ed Acosta (1–0) LP: Angel Hernández (0–1); Home runs: VEN: None; MEX: Bobby Tucker (1)

==== Game 12, February 6 ====
Team	1	2	3	4	5	6	7	8	9	R	H	E
Dominican Republic	1	0	0	0	2	0	1	1	0	5	14	1
Puerto Rico	0	1	0	0	1	2	0	0	0	4	10	5
WP: Bill Castro (1–0) LP: John Candelaria (0–1); Home runs: DOM: Bobby Darwin (1); PUR: None

== Sources ==
- Antero Núñez, José. Series del Caribe. Impresos Urbina, Caracas, Venezuela.
- Araujo Bojórquez, Alfonso. Series del Caribe: Narraciones y estadísticas, 1949-2001. Colegio de Bachilleres del Estado de Sinaloa, Mexico.
- Figueredo, Jorge S. Cuban Baseball: A Statistical History, 1878–1961. Macfarland & Co., United States.
- González Echevarría, Roberto. The Pride of Havana. Oxford University Express.
- Gutiérrez, Daniel. Enciclopedia del Béisbol en Venezuela, Caracas, Venezuela.
