= 1976 Caribbean Series =

1976 baseball tournament

The nineteenth edition of the Caribbean Series (Serie del Caribe) was played in 1976. It was held from February 4 through February 9 with the champions teams from the Dominican Republic, Águilas Cibaeñas; Mexico, Naranjeros de Hermosillo; Puerto Rico, Vaqueros de Bayamón and Venezuela, Tigres de Aragua. The format consisted of 12 games, each team facing the other teams twice, and was played in Dominican Republic. For the first time in Series history, the games were played at two different venues, the Estadio Quisqueya in Santo Domingo and the Estadio Cibao in Santiago de los Caballeros.

== Summary ==
The Naranjeros de Hermosillo gave Mexico its first Caribbean Series championship title. Managed by legendary Cananea Reyes, the team outscored their opponents 36 to 18 over the six-day tournament in Dominican Republic, winning five consecutive games to pull an upset in the opener and prevailing behind their fine pitching, which gave up just 16 earned runs in 57 innings (2.53). Rich Hinton (seven-hit shutout) and George Brunet (1-0, 1.50) each turned fine performances, while 1B Héctor Espino, OF Jerry Hairston, 3B Celerino Sánchez and 2B Bump Wills paced the hitting attack. Also in the roster were C Sergio Robles, SS Eddie Leon, OFs Arnoldo de Hoyos and Chet Lemon, and Ps Ed Acosta, Francisco Barrios and Vicente Romo. Espino was named the Most Valuable Player, while the team had six players in the All-Star team.

Managed by Ozzie Virgil, the Tigres de Aragua of the Venezuelan league won its first two games, but they went 1-3 the rest of the way and had to settle for second place. Four hitters carried much of the offensive weight: CF Enos Cabell (.400, best average in the Series; seven RBI), RF Terry Whitfield (.375, eight runs, five RBI), 3B Manny Trillo (.333) and 2B Duane Kuiper (.320). Their best pitcher was Mark Wiley, who posted a 2-0 record and a 2.04 ERA, while Manny Sarmiento (1-0, one save) and Aurelio Monteagudo did the job out of the bullpen. The team also featured 1B Tim Hosley, SS Dave Concepción, and Ps Bill Campbell, Roberto Muñoz and Willie Prall.

The Dominican Republic team, with Tim Murtaugh at the helm, disappointed their home fans after going 2-4 to finish in third place. The Águilas Cibaeñas, who had won their second title in a row, usually put players on the bases but lacked the necessary clutch hitting to bring them home. OFs Miguel Diloné and César Gerónimo provided good defense and speed on the bases, while 3B Winston Llenas and 1B/C Bill Nahorodny smashed the only home runs for the team. Besides this, their most effective starters in ERA had losing records: Rick Waits (0-1, 2.13) and Rick Langford (0-1, 3.00), while starter Jerry Augustine (6.00 ERA) and reliever Kent Tekulve (11.59 ERA) delivered the only wins for Dominican Republic. Other members of the team included Ps Tom Dettore, Nino Espinosa and Juan Jiménez; C Ed Ott, 2B Bob Sheldon, SS Frank Taveras, OF Morris Nettles, and DH Manny Mota.

The favored reigning champion, Vaqueros de Bayamón, tied for third with a 2-4 record. One victory came from Juan Pizarro, who hurled a three-hit shutout in Game 7. The Puerto Rico team, piloted by José Pagán, scored the fewest runs (23) and committed the most errors (15) in the Series. Inexplicably, the anemic Boricua offense combined for a paltry .246 average, even though the team had a solid lineup that included 1B Dan Driessen, Of Ken Griffey, Sr., 3B Art Howe, SS Iván de Jesús, C Ellie Rodríguez and the outfield brothers, Héctor and José Cruz among others.

Final standings
Club	W	L	W/L %	GB	Manager
Mexico	5	1	.833	–	Cananea Reyes
Venezuela	3	3	.500	2	Ozzie Virgil
Dominican Republic	2	4	.333	3	Tim Murtaugh
Puerto Rico	2	4	.333	3	José Pagán

Individual leaders
Player/Club	Statistic
Enos Cabell / VEN	Batting average	.400
Arnoldo de Hoyos / MEX; Terry Whitfield / VEN	Runs scored	8
Enos Cabell / VEN	Hits	10
Duane Kuiper / VEN	Doubles	3
Manny Mota / DOM	Triples	3
Héctor Cruz / PUR; Héctor Espino / MEX; Winston Llenas / DOM; Bill Nahorodny / DOM; Terry Whitfield / VEN	Home runs	1
Enos Cabell / VEN; Héctor Espino / MEX	Runs batted in	7
Dave Concepción / VEN	Stolen bases	2
Mark Wiley / VEN	Wins	2
Rich Hinton / MEX; Juan Pizarro / PUR	ERA	0.00
Mark Wiley / VEN	Strikeouts	13
Mark Wiley / VEN	Innings pitched	17 2/3
Awards
Héctor Espino / MEX	Most Valuable Player
Cananea Reyes / MEX	Manager

All-Star Team
Name/Club	Position
Sergio Robles / MEX	catcher
Héctor Espino / MEX	first baseman
Bump Wills / MEX	second baseman
Celerino Sánchez / MEX	third baseman
Dave Concepción / VEN	shortstop
Miguel Diloné / DOM	left fielder
Arnoldo de Hoyos / MEX	center fielder
Terry Whitfield / VEN	right fielder
Manny Mota / DOM	designated hitter
Mark Wiley / VEN	RH pitcher
George Brunet / MEX	LH pitcher
Cananea Reyes / MEX	manager

=== Scoreboards ===
==== Game 1, February 4 ====
Team	1	2	3	4	5	6	7	8	9	R	H	E
Venezuela	2	0	1	0	0	0	0	1	3	7	12	2
Puerto Rico	0	0	0	0	0	3	0	0	0	3	9	3
WP: Mark Wiley (1-0) LP: Bob Reynolds (0-1) Sv: Manny Sarmiento (1)

==== Game 2, February 4 ====
Team	1	2	3	4	5	6	7	8	9	10	R	H	E
Mexico	0	0	0	0	0	0	0	3	0	0	3	9	1
Dominican Republic	0	0	1	0	0	0	1	1	0	1	4	7	0
WP: Kent Tekulve (1-0) LP: Francisco Barrios (0-1); Notes: The Dominican Republic scored the winning run after Barrios issued a bases-loaded walk to Morris Nettles in the bottom of the 10th inning.

==== Game 3, February 5 ====
Team	1	2	3	4	5	6	7	8	9	10	11	R	H	E
Puerto Rico	0	0	0	0	0	2	0	0	1	0	0	3	12	1
Mexico	0	1	0	0	0	0	0	1	1	0	1	4	10	0
WP: Tony Komadina (1-0) LP: Bob Reynolds (0-2); Home runs: PUR: None; MEX: Héctor Espino (1); Notes: Jerry Hairston drove in the winning run with a bases-loaded single in the bottom of the 11th inning.

==== Game 4, February 5 ====
Team	1	2	3	4	5	6	7	8	9	10	R	H	E
Dominican Republic	0	0	0	0	2	2	0	4	1	0	9	13	1
Venezuela	3	0	1	0	0	0	3	0	2	1	10	14	4
WP: Manny Sarmiento (1-0) LP: Juan Jiménez (0-1); Home runs: DOM: Winston Llenas (1); VEN: Terry Whitfield (1)

==== Game 5, February 6 ====
Team	1	2	3	4	5	6	7	8	9	R	H	E
Venezuela	2	0	3	0	0	2	0	0	0	7	14	0
Mexico	0	0	2	2	1	0	4	3	x	12	13	1
WP: Ed Acosta (1-0) LP: Aurelio Monteagudo (0-1); Home runs: VEN: None; MEX: Celerino Sánchez (1)

==== Game 6, February 6 ====
Team	1	2	3	4	5	6	7	8	9	R	H	E
Puerto Rico	0	5	0	0	0	0	0	0	0	5	5	1
Dominican Republic	0	0	0	0	0	2	0	0	2	4	6	3
WP: Odell Jones (1-0) LP: Rick Langford (0-1); Notes: Both pitchers hurled complete games.

==== Game 7, February 7 ====
Team	1	2	3	4	5	6	7	8	9	R	H	E
Puerto Rico	0	0	1	0	1	0	0	0	0	2	7	2
Venezuela	0	0	0	0	0	0	0	0	0	0	3	3
WP: Juan Pizarro (1-0) LP: Roberto Muñoz (0-1); Notes: Pizarro struck out eight and walked four, while allowing just three singles to Enos Cabell (2) and Manny Trillo.

==== Game 8, February 7 ====
Team	1	2	3	4	5	6	7	8	9	R	H	E
Dominican Republic	0	0	0	0	0	0	0	0	0	0	7	1
Mexico	0	0	0	0	0	3	1	0	x	4	11	1
WP: Rich Hinton (1-0) LP: Nino Espinosa (0-1); Notes: Hinton was dominant in his seven-hit shutout of the Dominicans.

==== Game 9, February 8 ====
Team	1	2	3	4	5	6	7	8	9	R	H	E
Mexico	1	0	1	0	0	0	0	5	0	7	11	1
Puerto Rico	0	0	0	0	0	3	0	0	0	3	9	1
WP: Vicente Romo (1-0) LP: Jerry Johnson (0-1)

==== Game 10, February 8 ====
Team	1	2	3	4	5	6	7	8	9	R	H	E
Venezuela	1	0	0	4	0	0	0	0	0	5	6	2
Dominican Republic	2	1	0	0	0	0	0	0	0	3	7	4
WP: Mark Wiley (2-0) LP: Rick Waits (0-1); Notes: Wiley allowed only an earned run and struck out seven batters without giving a walk in his complete game.

==== Game 11, February 9 ====
Team	1	2	3	4	5	6	7	8	9	R	H	E
Mexico	0	0	1	0	0	1	4	0	0	6	11	0
Venezuela	0	0	0	1	0	0	0	0	0	1	6	2
WP: George Brunet (1-0) LP: Bill Campbell (0-1); Notes: Brunet struck out five and walked one over nine innings, while his only run allowed was unearned and came in the fourth after he threw a wild pitch.

==== Game 12, February 9 ====
Team	1	2	3	4	5	6	7	8	9	R	H	E
Dominican Republic	1	5	1	0	0	0	0	0	2	9	12	1
Puerto Rico	0	0	0	3	0	0	3	0	1	7	13	7
WP: Jerry Augustine (1-0) LP: Julio Navarro (0-1); Home runs: DOM: Bill Nahorodny (1); PUR: Héctor Cruz (1)

== Sources ==
- Antero Núñez, José. Series del Caribe. Impresos Urbina, Caracas, Venezuela.
- Araujo Bojórquez, Alfonso. Series del Caribe: Narraciones y estadísticas, 1949-2001. Colegio de Bachilleres del Estado de Sinaloa, Mexico.
- Figueredo, Jorge S. Cuban Baseball: A Statistical History, 1878–1961. Macfarland & Co., United States.
- González Echevarría, Roberto. The Pride of Havana. Oxford University Express.
- Gutiérrez, Daniel. Enciclopedia del Béisbol en Venezuela, Caracas, Venezuela.
