= Eduardo Acosta =

Mexican baseball player (1949–2006)

- Pitcher
- Born: 26 March 1949; Chihuahua City, Chihuahua, Mexico
- Died: 11 August 2006 (aged 57); Chihuahua City, Chihuahua, Mexico
- Batted: Right Threw: Right

Member of the Caribbean Baseball

Baseball Hall of Fame
- Induction: 2009

Eduardo Ernesto Acosta López (26 March 1949 – 11 August 2006) was a Mexican professional baseball pitcher. Acosta played in the minor leagues with Los Angeles Dodgers organization. He later spent 10 seasons in the Mexican League and 12 seasons in the Mexican Pacific League. In 1976, he was a member of the Naranjeros de Hermosillo team that won the Caribbean Series, giving Mexico its first championship in the tournament's history. In 2009, he was enshrined into the Caribbean Baseball Hall of Fame.

== Early career ==
Acosta was born on 26 March 1949 in Chihuahua City, Chihuahua. In 1966, he was part of the amateur team that represented Mexico at the 1966 Central American and Caribbean Games in San Juan, Puerto Rico. In 1967, he was selected to play at the 1967 Pan American Games in Winnipeg. In 1969, aged 19, Acosta was signed by the Tigres de México.

== Professional career ==
=== Minor leagues ===
In 1969, while a prospect with the Tigres de México, Acosta signed with the Los Angeles Dodgers organization. He played for the Rogue Valley Dodgers and Daytona Beach Dodgers during the 1969 season, posting a combined 8–8 record. On July 7, he pitched a seven-inning perfect game against the Walla Walla Bears. In 1970, he returned to Daytona Beach and also played for the Bakersfield Dodgers. He left the Dodgers organization after the 1970 season, having reached as high as Class A.

=== Mexican League ===
In 1971, Acosta returned to the Mexican League, joining the Saraperos de Saltillo during their second season of existence. He quickly established himself as a key member of the team, which reached the Mexican League championship series that season before losing 3–4 to the Charros de Jalisco. By 1972, Acosta had become the team's ace pitcher.

Acosta played for the Diablos Rojos del México in 1975, the Alacranes de Durango in 1976, and the Dorados de Chihuahua from 1977 to 1980. In 1980, he joined the Acereros de Monclova, serving as both a player and manager.

=== Mexican Pacific League ===
Acosta played 12 seasons in the Mexican Pacific League (LMP), making his debut with the Naranjeros de Hermosillo during the 1969–70 season. He won three LMP championships with Hermosillo and represented Mexico in the Caribbean Series in 1971 and 1975. In the 1975 edition, Acosta led the tournament in strikeouts with 10 in 12 innings. He returned to the Caribbean Series in 1976 as a member of the Naranjeros, who won the championship, giving Mexico its first Caribbean Series title.

In 1978, Acosta joined the Venados de Mazatlán, where he played through the 1980 season. He returned to the Mexican Pacific League for the 1982–83 season, playing for the Yaquis de Obregón.

== Death and legacy ==
In 2002, Acosta was enshrined into the Chihuahua Sports Hall of Fame. He died on 11 August 2006.

In 2009, Acosta was inducted into the Caribbean Baseball Hall of Fame alongside fellow pitcher Mercedes Esquer. He appeared in three editions of the Caribbean Series (1971, 1975 and 1976), and received a total of 139 votes.
