= 1971 Caribbean Series =

Fourteenth edition of the Caribbean Series baseball tournament

The fourteenth edition of the Caribbean Series (Serie del Caribe) baseball tournament was played in 1971. It was held from February 6 through February 11 with the champions teams from Dominican Republic, Tigres del Licey; Mexico, Naranjeros de Hermosillo; Puerto Rico, Cangrejeros de Santurce, and Venezuela, Tiburones de La Guaira. The format consisted of 12 games, each team facing the other teams twice, and the games were played at Hiram Bithorn Stadium in San Juan, Puerto Rico, which boosted its capacity to 18,000 seats. The first pitch was thrown by Bowie Kuhn, by then the Commissioner of Major League Baseball.

== Summary ==
Dominican Republic captured the competition with an undefeated record of 6-0, behind a strong effort by manager Manny Mota, who also led the Series hitters with a .579 batting average (11-for-19) and won Most Valuable Player honors. The pitching support came from Chris Zachary (2-0), Reggie Cleveland (1-0), and reliever Pedro Borbón (1-0, two saves). Other key players for Licey included Jim Beauchamp, Carmen Fanzone, César Gerónimo, Elvio Jiménez and Rafael Robles.

Puerto Rico, Mexico and Venezuela shared second place with a 2-4 record.

Puerto Rico's team, managed by Frank Robinson, was a huge favorite to win the Series, thanks to a roster loaded with prominent players like Sandy Alomar Sr., Don Baylor, Elrod Hendricks, Reggie Jackson, Mike Kekich, Buck Martinez, Jerry Morales, Tony Pérez, Juan Pizarro, but the team faded just after the first half.

For the first time, a representing team of Mexico took part in this tournament. Hermosillo was guided by Maury Wills and the offensive support came from Celerino Sánchez, who led the Series hitters in home runs (3) and RBI (9). Other noted players were Ed Acosta, Bobby Darwin, Héctor Espino, Francisco Estrada, Jim Ray, Sergio Robles, Vicente Romo and Zoilo Versalles.

Graciano Ravelo managed the Venezuela club, which was clearly led by Pat Kelly (.381 BA, 2 HR, .714 slugging) and Ángel Bravo (7-for-21, .333 BA), while Leo Cárdenas hit .409 (9-for-22) for an otherwise weak offense, bottomed out by Ed Spiezio (3-for-19, .158 BA), José Cardenal (4-for-22, .182 BA) and Enzo Hernández (6-for-23, .264). George Lauzerique (1-0, 1.64 ERA, 7 SO) was a high point in a pitching rotation headed by Larry Gura (0-1, 4.00), Steve Barber (0-2, 5.56) and Aurelio Monteagudo (0-1, 9.58). Orlando Peña (1-0, 3.00 ERA) provided a solid support in three relief appearances.

Final standings
	Club	W	L	W/L %	GB
(Dominican Republic)	Dominican Republic	6	0	1.000	–
(Puerto Rico)	Puerto Rico	2	4	.333	4.0
(Mexico)	Mexico	2	4	.333	4.0
(Venezuela)	Venezuela	2	4	.333	4.0

Individual leaders
Player/Club	Statistic	
Manny Mota/DOM	Batting average	.579
Celerino Sánchez/MEX	Home runs	3
Celerino Sánchez/MEX	Runs batted in	9
Teodoro Martínez/DOM	Runs	9
Manny Mota/DOM	Hits	11
Pat Kelly/VEN	Doubles	2
Sandy Alomar Sr./PRI	Triples	2
Tony Pérez/PRI	Stolen bases	2
Chris Zachary/DOM	Wins	2
George Lauzerique/VEN	Strikeouts	7
Chris Zachary/DOM	Earned run average	0.56
Chris Zachary/DOM	Innings pitched	16
Pedro Borbón/DOM; Chi-Chi Olivo/DOM	Saves	2
Awards
Manny Mota/DOM	Most Valuable Player	
Manny Mota/DOM	Manager	

All-Star Team
Name/Club	Position
Sergio Robles/MEX	catcher
Jim Beauchamp/DOM	first baseman
Teodoro Martínez/DOM	second baseman
Celerino Sánchez/MEX	third baseman
Milton Ramírez/PRI	shortstop
José Herrera/VEN	left fielder
Manny Mota/DOM	center fielder
Pat Kelly/VEN	right fielder
Chris Zachary/DOM	Pitcher
Manny Mota/DOM	manager

=== Scoreboards ===
==== Game 1, February 6 ====
Team	1	2	3	4	5	6	7	8	9	R	H	E
Dominican Republic	0	0	2	1	0	0	0	2	0	5	12	0
Venezuela	0	0	0	2	1	1	0	0	0	4	9	1
WP: Pedro Borbón (1-0) LP: Steve Barber (0-1) Sv: Don Shaw (1); Home runs: DOM: Rafael Robles (1), Freddie Velázquez (1); VEN: Pat Kelly (1), Ed Spiezio (1)

==== Game 2, February 6 ====
Team	1	2	3	4	5	6	7	8	9	10	11	R	H	E
Puerto Rico	0	2	0	0	0	2	0	0	0	0	1	5	13	3
Mexico	0	0	0	0	0	1	0	1	2	0	0	4	10	0
WP: Bob Chlupsa (1-0) LP: Gary Ross (0-1); Home runs: PRI: Buck Martinez (1); MEX: Celerino Sánchez (1), Zoilo Versalles 2 (2)

==== Game 3, February 7 ====
Team	1	2	3	4	5	6	7	8	9	R	H	E
Dominican Republic	0	0	1	1	1	4	0	1	0	8	10	1
Mexico	0	2	0	2	0	0	1	0	1	6	11	1
WP: Reggie Cleveland (1-0) LP: Alfredo Ortiz (0-1) Sv: Román Colón (1); Home runs: DOM: None; MEX: Celerino Sánchez (2)

==== Game 4, February 7 ====
Team	1	2	3	4	5	6	7	8	9	R	H	E
Venezuela	0	2	0	0	3	0	0	0	1	6	9	2
Puerto Rico	0	0	2	1	0	0	1	1	0	5	9	1
WP: Orlando Peña (1-0) LP: William de Jesús (0-1); Home runs: VEN: José Herrera (1); PRI: Reggie Jackson (1)

==== Game 5, February 8 ====
Team	1	2	3	4	5	6	7	8	9	R	H	E
Venezuela	2	0	0	0	0	0	2	1	0	5	9	2
Mexico	0	0	0	0	0	2	0	0	0	2	2	1
WP: George Lauzerique (1-0) LP: José Peña (0-1); Home runs: VEN: José Cardenal (1), Pat Kelly (2); MEX: None

==== Game 6, February 8 ====
Team	1	2	3	4	5	6	7	8	9	R	H	E
Puerto Rico	0	0	2	0	0	0	2	0	0	4	9	1
Dominican Republic	0	1	1	0	2	1	0	0	X	5	9	4
WP: Harry Parker (1-0) LP: Joe Decker (0-1) Sv: Chi-Chi Olivo (1)

==== Game 7, February 9 ====
Team	1	2	3	4	5	6	7	8	9	R	H	E
Venezuela	0	1	0	0	0	0	0	0	1	2	11	2
Dominican Republic	1	0	0	0	0	0	0	3	X	4	7	2
WP: Chi-Chi Olivo (1-0) LP: Larry Gura (0-1) Sv: Pedro Borbón (1)

==== Game 8, February 9 ====
Team	1	2	3	4	5	6	7	8	9	R	H	E
Mexico	0	1	0	0	0	4	0	0	2	7	10	2
Puerto Rico	0	0	0	4	1	0	0	0	0	5	9	1
WP: Manuel Lugo (1-0) LP: Rubén Gómez (0-1) Sv: Gary Ross (1); Home runs: MEX: Celerino Sánchez (3); PRI: None

==== Game 9, February 10 ====
Team	1	2	3	4	5	6	7	8	9	R	H	E
Mexico	0	0	0	0	0	0	0	0	0	0	2	2
Dominican Republic	0	0	0	0	0	1	3	1	X	5	10	0
WP: Chris Zachary (1-0) LP: Maximino León (0-1)

==== Game 10, February 10 ====
Team	1	2	3	4	5	6	7	8	9	R	H	E
Puerto Rico	0	1	0	2	0	0	0	0	0	3	11	0
Venezuela	0	0	0	0	0	0	1	0	1	2	8	0
WP: Mike Kekich (1-0) LP: Steve Barber (0-2) Sv: Roger Moret (1)

==== Game 11, February 11 ====
Team	1	2	3	4	5	6	7	8	9	R	H	E
Mexico	2	0	0	2	3	0	0	0	0	7	13	2
Venezuela	0	1	0	0	0	0	0	1	0	2	6	0
WP: Jim Ray (1-0) LP: Aurelio Monteagudo (0-1)

==== Game 12, February 11 ====
Team	1	2	3	4	5	6	7	8	9	R	H	E
Dominican Republic	0	3	0	0	2	0	0	0	1	6	15	2
Puerto Rico	0	1	0	0	0	0	0	1	2	4	4	0
WP: Chris Zachary (2-0) LP: Dave Leonhard (0-1) Sv: Chi-Chi Olivo (2); Home runs: DOM: None; PRI: Arsenio Rodríguez (1), Elrod Hendricks (1)

== See also ==
- Ballplayers who have played in the Series

== Sources ==
- Antero Núñez, José. Series del Caribe. Jefferson, Caracas, Venezuela: Impresos Urbina, C.A., 1987.
- Gutiérrez, Daniel. Enciclopedia del Béisbol en Venezuela – 1895–2006 . Caracas, Venezuela: Impresión Arte, C.A., 2007.
