= Miguel Flores (baseball) =

Mexican baseball player and manager (born 1970)

Sultanes de Monterrey
- Second baseman / Manager / Sporting director
- Born: 16 August 1970; Monterrey, Nuevo León, Mexico
- Bats: Right Throws: Right

Career highlights and awards
- Mexican Pacific League Rookie of the Year Award (1991–92); Sultanes de Monterrey #20 retired; Naranjeros de Hermosillo #20 retired

Member of the Mexican Professional

Baseball Hall of Fame
- Induction: 2024

Flores' number 20 was retired by the Sultanes de Monterrey (left) on 21 July 2011 and by the Naranjeros de Hermosillo (right) on 6 November 2019.

Miguel Ángel Flores González (born 16 August 1970) is a Mexican former professional baseball infielder and manager and current baseball executive for the Sultanes de Monterrey. Flores played 15 seasons in the Mexican League, all but one with the Sultanes, and 16 seasons in the Mexican Pacific League. From 1990 to 1995 he played minor league baseball in the Cleveland Indians organization. He is the current sporting director of the Sultanes de Monterrey.

== Early career ==
Flores was born on 16 August 1970 in Monterrey, Nuevo León. He played youth baseball in Monterrey's Liga Pequeña de Beisbol Obispado (Obispado Baseball Little League). He was later selected to represent Nuevo León in national amateur baseball competitions and moved to San Antonio, Texas to play baseball at Luther Burbank High School.

== Professional career ==
=== Cleveland Indians ===
Flores was drafted by the Cleveland Indians organization in 1989 and joined the Burlington Indians of the Appalachian League for the 1990 season. In 1991 he was promoted to the Kinston Indians of the Carolina League. In 1992 he was again promoted to the Canton–Akron Indians of the Double-A Eastern League. In 1994, Flores played for the Charlotte Knights of the International League and in 1995 for the Buffalo Bisons of the American Association.

=== Mexican League ===
After spending six seasons in the Indians minor league system, Flores made his Mexican League (LMB) debut with the Sultanes de Monterrey in 1995. He spent 14 seasons playing with the Sultanes from 1995 to 2002 and from 2004 to 2009, winning the 1995, 1996 and 2007 Mexican League championships with the Fantasmas grises (Gray Phantoms). In 2003, the only season he did not spend with the Sultanes, he played for the Broncos de Reynosa and Leones de Yucatán.

=== Mexican Pacific League ===
Flores made his debut in the Mexican Pacific League (LMP) in the 1991–92 season with the Naranjeros de Hermosillo, winning the Rookie of the Year Award and the LMP championship. He played seven seasons for the Naranjeros until the 2000–01 season. Flores also played for the Venados de Mazatlán, Cañeros de Los Mochis and Tomateros de Culiacán before retiring after the 2006–07 season.

Mexican Pacific League career statistics
Seasons	G	AB	R	H	2B	3B	HR	RBI	SB	BB	BA	SLG
16	871	3389	520	939	164	11	44	330	185	352	.277	.371

== Legacy ==
Flores' number 20 was retired by the Sultanes de Monterrey on 21 July 2011 and the Naranjeros de Hermosillo on 6 November 2019.

Flores was enshrined into the Mexican Professional Baseball Hall of Fame as part of the class of 2024, alongside pitchers Yovani Gallardo, Juan Manuel Palafox, Cecilio Ruiz and Richard Sandate, infielder Ramón Orantes, and umpire Luis Alberto Ramírez.
