= Miguel Sotelo =

Mexican baseball player and manager

- Pitcher / Manager
- Born: 22 June 1933; Los Mochis, Sinaloa, México
- Died: 6 July 2007 (aged 74); Chihuahua, Chihuahua, México
- Batted: Right Threw: Right

Arizona–Texas League debut
- 1953, for the Águilas de Mexicali (as player)

Last Mexican League appearance
- 1990, for the Olmecas de Tabasco (as manager)

Career highlights and awards
- Mexican League championship (1969); Mexican Pacific League records: 18 wins, single season

Member of the Mexican Professional

Baseball Hall of Fame
- Induction: 1985

Miguel Sotelo (22 June 1933 – 6 July 2007) was a Mexican professional baseball pitcher and manager who spent more than 25 years in professional baseball playing in the Mexican League and Mexican Pacific League.

== Career ==
Sotelo was born in Los Mochis, Sinaloa on 22 June 1933. He made his debut in 1953 with the Águilas de Mexicali club of the Arizona–Texas League. The following year he was under the orders of George Genovese in a minor league team in Hutchinson, Kansas Pittsburgh Pirates lower division club. In 1955, he then was transferred to the Arizona–Mexico League where he excelled with the Cananea BBC pitching a no-hitter against the Phoenix Stars. One year later he made his Mexican League debut with the Tigres del México. He also played for the Cañeros de Los Mochis and in his first year had a record of 18–6 with 13 consecutive wins.

In the 1962–1963 Mexican Pacific League season, while playing for the Naranjeros de Hermosillo, he pitched a no hitter against the Navajo BBC. He retired in 1967 with a total of 133 win 115 losses in the Mexican League and with a record of 130-88 in the winter Mexican Pacific League.

Sotelo started his managerial career in 1968 with the Tecolotes de Nuevo Laredo, and later managed for the Broncos de Reynosa (1969–1970), Alijadores de Tampico (1971), Pericos de Puebla (1972), Sultanes de Monterrey (1973–1976; 1986), Mineros de Coahuila (1977), Tecolotes de Nuevo Laredo (1978), Rojos del Águila de Veracruz (1979–1980), Olmecas de Tabasco (1987; 1990) and Acereros de Monclova (1988). In 1969 he guided Reynosa to win the league championship.

In 1985, Sotelo was enshrined in the Mexican Professional Baseball Hall of Fame.

Sotelo holds the Mexican Pacific League record for most wins in a season, with 18, achieved during the 1961–1962 season.

== Managerial achievements ==
League	Club	Country	Season
Mexican Baseball League	Broncos de Reynosa	México	1967–1968
