= Estadio Adolfo López Mateos =

Stadium in Reynosa, Mexico

- Interactive map of Estadio Adolfo López Mateos
- Location: Carretera Federal 40 (Blvd. Miguel Hidalgo); Reynosa, Tamaulipas, Mexico
- Coordinates: 26°4′43.77″N 98°18′44.25″W
- Capacity: 10,000
- Surface: Grass

Construction
- Built: 1962
- Opened: 14 June 1962
- Renovated: 1995, 2009, 2025
- Cost: Mex$4,426,867

Tenants
- Broncos de Reynosa (LMB) 1963–1976, 1980–1982, 1995–2003, 2009–2016; Tigres B (LdeA) 2007–2008; Zorros de Reynosa (SDM) 2008

Estadio Adolfo López Mateos is a stadium in Reynosa, Mexico. It is primarily used for baseball and has served as the home stadium for the Broncos de Reynosa. From 2007 to 2008 the stadium served as an association football venue for the Tigres B team that later moved to San Nicolás de los Garza in the greater Monterrey area. From 2008 on it has been home to the Zorros de Reynosa football club that currently plays in the Segunda División de México. The stadium has a capacity of 10,000 people. It was named after Adolfo López Mateos who served as President of Mexico from 1958 to 1964.

On 12 July 2010 a game between the Broncos and the Monterrey Sultans at Estadio Adolfo López Mateos had to be suspended due to gunfire, possibly in relation to the Mexican drug war. The game was rescheduled and moved to Monterrey.

During 2024 and 2025, the stadium was renovated, bringing new features such as artificial turf, a jumbotron, new seats, and more.
