= Alfredo Aceves =

Mexican baseball player (born 1982)

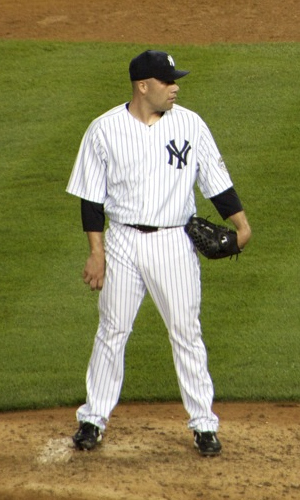
- Aceves with the New York Yankees in 2009
- Pitcher
- Born: 8 December 1982 (age 43); San Luis Río Colorado, Sonora, Mexico
- Batted: Right Threw: Right

MLB debut
- 31 August, 2008, for the New York Yankees

Last MLB appearance
- 2 June, 2014, for the New York Yankees

MLB statistics
- Win–loss record: 31–16
- Earned run average: 3.83
- Strikeouts: 282
- Stats at Baseball Reference

Teams
- New York Yankees (2008–2010); Boston Red Sox (2011–2013); New York Yankees (2014)

Career highlights and awards
- World Series champion (2009)

Alfredo Aceves Martínez (born 8 December 1982) is a Mexican former professional baseball pitcher. He pitched in Major League Baseball (MLB) for the New York Yankees and Boston Red Sox.

Aceves used a fastball, which could reach the mid 90s, a curveball, a changeup, and a cut fastball. He was known for his control and his ability to throw any pitch in any count.

== Career ==
=== Early career ===
Aceves was signed by the Toronto Blue Jays as an amateur free agent in 2001. He made ten starts in the Dominican Summer League that year. However, Aceves felt isolated, and when the Blue Jays assigned him to stay in the DSL for 2002, Aceves stayed in Mexico, and his contract was purchased by the Leones de Yucatán of the Mexican League. Aceves pitched for Yucatán and Sultanes de Monterrey for the next six seasons.

=== New York Yankees ===
Yankees scout Lee Sigman followed Aceves in the Mexican League, feeling he could achieve similar success as Teddy Higuera, who Sigman had signed for the Milwaukee Brewers. Feeling that he had developed well in the Mexican League, the Yankees purchased Aceves, along with Manny Banuelos and two other players, for $450,000 during the 2007–08 offseason. He began 2008 with the Single-A Advanced Tampa Yankees. He was quickly promoted to the Double-A Trenton Thunder and Triple-A Scranton/Wilkes-Barre Yankees. He was named Eastern League pitcher of the week for the week ending 25 May 2008.

After going a combined 8–6 with a 2.62 earned run average (ERA) on the three Yankee farm teams, Aceves was called up to the Yankees on 28 August, 2008. On 31 August, Aceves made his Yankee and major league debut, pitching two scoreless innings in relief as the Yankees lost to the Blue Jays, 6–2.

After pitching effectively through his first few relief appearances, Aceves was moved to the rotation in replacement of Darrell Rasner. In his first career start, he pitched seven innings of one-run ball with two strikeouts against the Los Angeles Angels of Anaheim, earning the win.

After starting the 2009 season in the minors, Aceves rejoined the Yankees on 4 May. Due to his ability to pitch effectively in any situation, Aceves has drawn comparisons to former Yankee reliever and spot starter Ramiro Mendoza.

Aceves made ten relief appearances in 2010 before succumbing to a strained lower back that ended his season. He suffered a broken collarbone in an off-season bicycle accident. He was non-tendered after the season.

=== Boston Red Sox ===
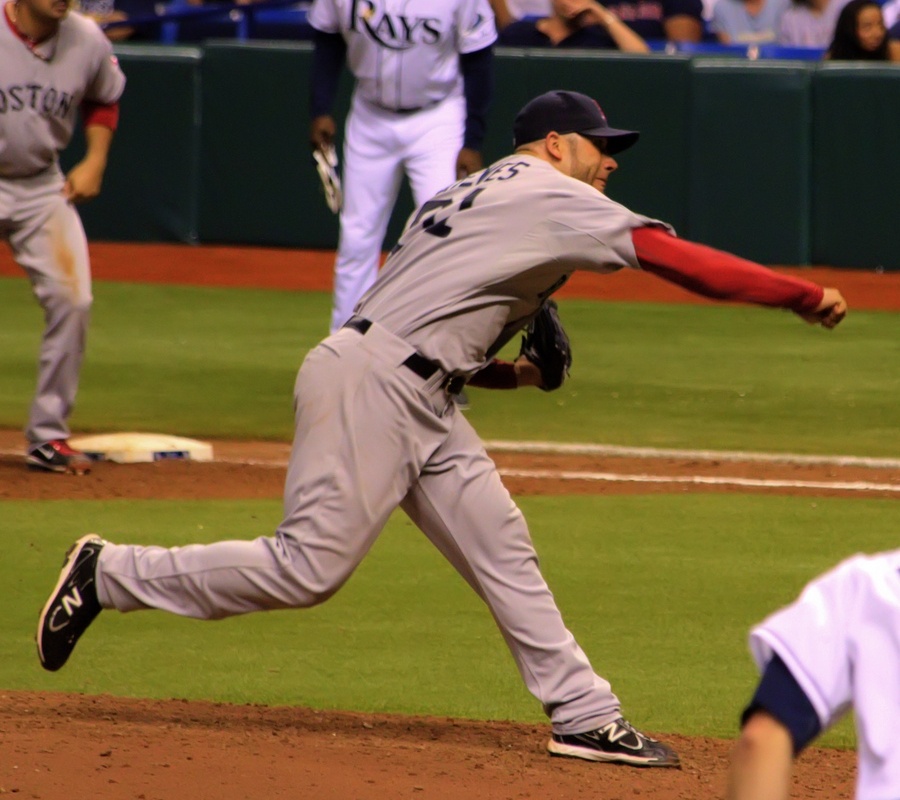
Aceves pitching for the Red Sox in 2011

Aceves was signed to a major league deal by the Boston Red Sox on 8 February 2011. On 21 April, he was optioned to the Triple-A Pawtucket Red Sox to make room for Matt Albers on the roster. On 6 May, Aceves was called back up, and on 16 May, he won his first game with the Red Sox. Between then and 1 September, Aceves had a 9–1 record out of the bullpen for Boston.

After an injury to Andrew Bailey, Aceves was named the acting closer for the beginning of the 2012 season, but had a slow start, surrendering the game-winning hit on Opening Day and allowing a game-tying home run in the ninth inning of the third game of the season. In late August, once Bailey returned from his injury, he took the closer role back. Aceves also had a year-long feud with manager Bobby Valentine that resulted in a brief suspension. There were also multiple on- and off-field confrontations.

After five games in 2013, which included three starts, Aceves was optioned to Triple-A Pawtucket on 25 April two days after giving away eight runs in 3 1/3 innings against the Oakland Athletics. Aceves was recalled on 24 May for a one-off start against the Philadelphia Phillies. Despite the win, he was optioned to Triple-A Pawtucket on 28 May. He was recalled again on 12 June, and returned to Pawtucket the next day. He was recalled on 7 July when Andrew Miller suffered a year-ending foot injury. He was optioned three days later. On 14 July, Aceves was outrighted off the 40-man roster after clearing waivers. He elected free agency on 4 October.

=== Baltimore Orioles ===
Aceves signed a minor league contract with the Baltimore Orioles on 15 January 2014. Aceves took a short break from 2014 Spring training to return to Mexico to obtain a work visa. After learning that he would not make the Orioles roster near the end of spring training, Aceves elected to opt out of his contract, making him a free agent.

=== New York Yankees (second stint) ===
Aceves signed a minor league deal with the New York Yankees on 28 March 2014. He received a promotion to the major league roster on 3 May, and pitched to a 1-2 record and 6.52 ERA with 16 strikeouts over 10 appearances. Aceves was designated for assignment by New York on 4 June. He cleared waivers and was sent outright to the Triple-A Scranton/Wilkes-Barre RailRiders on 9 June. On 3 July, Aceves was suspended for 50 games for failing a drug test for recreational drugs. He was released by the Yankees organization on 27 August.

=== Sultanes de Monterrey ===
Aceves signed a minor league contract with the San Francisco Giants on 7 March 2015. The Giants assigned him to the Sultanes de Monterrey of the Mexican League for the season. He was suspended for the remainder of the season in June for his confrontation with an umpire. In 11 appearances (10 starts) for the team, Aceves had compiled a 3-4 record and 3.40 ERA with 25 strikeouts over 53 innings of work.

Aceves made 10 starts for Monterrey during the 2016 season, registering a 4-3 record and 3.81 ERA with 29 strikeouts across 56 2/3 innings pitched. He was released on 16 May 2017 after struggling to a 6.35 ERA with six strikeouts over 3 starts for the team.

=== Saraperos de Saltillo ===
On 19 May 2017, Aceves signed with the Saraperos de Saltillo of the Mexican League. In eight appearances (seven starts) for Saltillo, he struggled to a 1–5 record and 6.41 ERA with 18 strikeouts across 39 1/3 innings pitched. Aceves was released by the Saraperos on 11 July 2017.

== Personal life ==
Aceves married his wife Arley in November 2008, after proposing to her during a Trenton Thunder game during the 2008 season. His father, Alfredo Aceves Sr., was a first baseman in the Mexican League. His older brother, Jonathan Aceves, was a minor league catcher in the Chicago White Sox organization, for the Naranjeros de Hermosillo in the Mexican Pacific League and for the Saraperos de Saltillo of the Mexican League. Aceves wears #91, a number worn by Dennis Rodman, whom Aceves admires. Aceves' son Apollo was born on 1 August 2013.

== See also ==
- List of Major League Baseball players from Mexico
