= Yunesky Sánchez =

Cuban baseball player (born 1984)

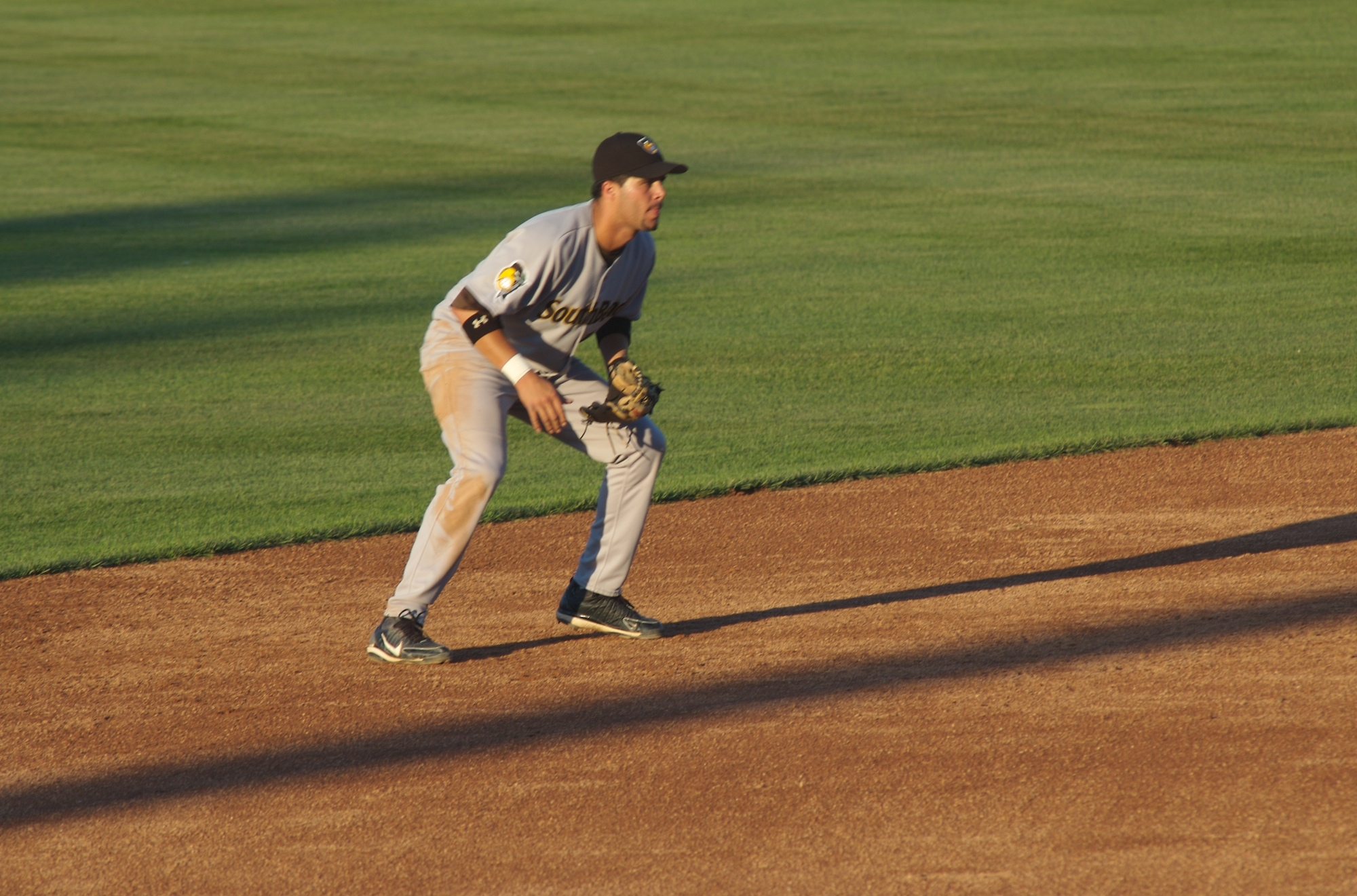

Free agent
- Infielder
- Born: May 3, 1984 (age 42); Cárdenas, Cuba
- Bats: Right Throws: Right
- Stats at Baseball Reference

Yunesky Sánchez (born May 3, 1984) is a Cuban professional baseball first baseman who is a free agent.

== Career ==
Sanchez played in the Arizona Diamondbacks farm system from 2007–2010 and the Pittsburgh Pirates system in 2010 and 2011. He played in the Atlantic League of Professional Baseball from 2011–2012 and then signed with the Laredo Lemurs of the American Association of Independent Professional Baseball to finish 2012. In Mexico, he played for the Guerreros de Oaxaca from 2013–2015, the Olmecas de Tabasco in 2016, and the Algodoneros de Unión Laguna in 2018. He also played in the Mexican Pacific League with the Naranjeros de Hermosillo. His wife Lisa was born in New York, but originates from the Dominican Republic. Sanchez has three daughters named Juliette, Kylie, and Victoria.

He played for the Spain national baseball team in the 2013 World Baseball Classic.
