= Broncos de Reynosa =

Logo	Cap insignia

Information
- League: Mexican League (1963–2016)
- Location: Reynosa, Tamaulipas
- Ballpark: Adolfo López Mateos Stadium
- Founded: 1963
- Folded: 2016
- League championships: 1 (1969)
- Colors: Green, orange and white
- Website: Official Site

The Broncos de Reynosa (English: Reynosa Broncos) were a professional baseball team in the Mexican League based in Reynosa, Tamaulipas. Their home ballpark was the Adolfo López Mateos Stadium.

== History ==
=== Early years ===
In the early 1960s, a group of baseball enthusiasts from Reynosa petitioned President Adolfo López Mateos for the construction of a baseball stadium in the city. The request was granted, and the Estadio Adolfo López Mateos opened in 1962. The stadium was initially home to the Petroleros de Reynosa of the Liga Otoñal.

That same year, the president of the Mexican Baseball League, Antonio Ramírez Muro, invited Reynosa to take part in the competition, as part of the league's expansion plans. A contest was held to determine the new team's nickname and Broncos was chosen as the winning entry.

The Broncos debuted in the Mexican League in 1963 against the Sultanes de Monterrey in Monterrey. They made their home debut in the Adolfo López Mateos Stadium on 6 April 1963 against the Diablos Rojos del México, losing the game 2–8.

The Broncos won its only Mexican League championship in 1969, under manager Miguel Sotelo, finishing the season with a 91–63 record, no final series were held, since the team that finished first in the standings after the end of the season would be crowned champion.

=== Revival ===
The Broncos returned to Reynosa's Stadium Adolfo Lopez Mateos in March 2009 through the efforts of Mayor Oscar Luebbeert. Major improvements to the stadium were made to attract fans. The stadium went into some major improvements that include converting the stadium into a big skeleton in order to renew installations, new parking section, new WC areas, new box seats. There was a change of team colors moving from the traditional orange to a new green.

The Broncos franchise has been transferred to the Bravos de León twice, in 1982 and 2016.

== Championships ==
Season	Manager	Opponent	Series score	Record
1969	Miguel Sotelo	No final series		91–63
Total championships			1	
