= Derek Bryant (baseball) =

American baseball player (born 1951)

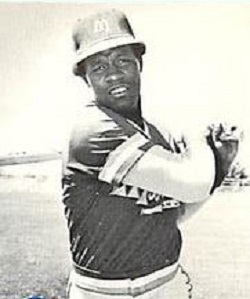
- Outfielder
- Born: October 9, 1951 (age 75); Lexington, Kentucky, U.S.
- Batted: Right Threw: Right

MLB debut
- April 24, 1979, for the Oakland Athletics

Last MLB appearance
- September 19, 1979, for the Oakland Athletics

MLB statistics
- Batting average: .179
- Home runs: 0
- Runs batted in: 13
- Stats at Baseball Reference

Teams
- Oakland Athletics (1979)

Member of the Mexican Professional

Baseball Hall of Fame
- Induction: 2010

Derek Roszell Bryant (born October 9, 1951) is an American former professional baseball player. He played in 39 games in Major League Baseball for the Oakland Athletics in 1979, primarily as an outfielder. He attended Henry Clay High School in Lexington KY as well as the University of Kentucky.

== Career ==
Bryant spent his entire career, from 1973 until 1981, in the Athletics organization. During his lone big league season, he batted .179 with three extra base hits in 108 at bats.

During spring training for the 1980 season, he was cut on the field by newly installed manager Billy Martin, who had evidently mistaken him for Glenn Burke (who Martin described as a "[m---------ing] homosexual"). Bryant never managed to make it up in the Athletics organization or the majors again.

Bryant has managed in the Mexican League on and off since 1988, mostly with the Sultanes de Monterrey (1988, 1995–98, 2001–02). In 1999, he managed the High Desert Mavericks in the Arizona Diamondbacks farm system. After his last stint with Monterrey, Bryant has managed the Acereros de Monclova (2003), the Saraperos de Saltillo (2004–07, 2012), the Vaqueros Laguna (2009–10) and the Olmecas de Tabasco (2011).
