= Tom Harmon (baseball) =

American baseball coach

- Coach
- Born: December 16, 1948 (age 77); Lubbock, Texas, U.S.
- Bats: Left Throws: Right

Teams
- Chicago Cubs (1982); University of Texas Longhorns (1989–2012) (Assistant)

Thomas Harold Harmon (born December 16, 1948) is an American baseball coach and a former minor league catcher and manager and Major League coach. He was assistant coach of the University of Texas Longhorns men's varsity baseball team from 1989 to 2012.

As a player, Harmon batted left-handed and threw right-handed; he stood 5 ft 11 in (1.80 m) tall and weighed 185 lb (84 kg). He graduated from Eastern Hills High School of Fort Worth, Texas, and The University of Texas at Austin with a degree in marketing. Harmon was a first-round, secondary phase selection of the Kansas City Royals in the June 1970 Major League Baseball draft, and broke into professional baseball at the advanced Double-A level, with the Elmira Pioneers of the Eastern League. In 1972, while a member of the Jacksonville Suns, he set a Southern League record with six hits in an extra-inning game — although he batted only .201 in 209 at bats for Jacksonville that season.

Although he never reached the Major Leagues, Harmon spent all or parts of seven seasons at the Triple-A level, and he finished his career in the St. Louis Cardinals and Philadelphia Phillies organizations, batting .254 in 649 games played with 12 home runs and 179 runs batted in. He then coached and managed in the Phillies' organization, where he won the 1979 Northwest League championship, from 1978 through 1981. In 1982, he spent a year at the major-league level as bullpen coach on the staff of Chicago Cubs manager Lee Elia. Like Harmon, Elia was a veteran of the Philadelphia organization brought to Chicago by the team's new general manager, Dallas Green.

Harmon returned to his native Texas in 1983 as manager of the Double-A Midland Cubs and, after a period in private business, joined the Longhorns' coaching staff in 1989.
