= Cananea Reyes =

Mexican baseball player and manager

- Manager / Coach
- Born: 18 February 1937; Nacozari de García, Sonora, Mexico
- Died: 11 November 1991 (aged 54); Hermosillo, Sonora, Mexico
- Batted: Right Threw: Right

Career statistics
- Win–loss record (managing): 1,685–1,329
- Winning percentage: .559

Teams
- As manager: Charros de Jalisco (1971–1973); Diablos Rojos del México (1974–1980; 1983–1991); Azules de Coatzacoalcos (1982); As coach: Seattle Mariners (1981)

Career highlights and awards
- Diablos Rojos del México No. 10 retired; Naranjeros de Hermosillo No. 10 retired

Member of the Mexican Professional

Baseball Hall of Fame
- Induction: 1992

Benjamín "Cananea" Reyes Chávez (18 February 1937 — 11 November 1991) was a Mexican professional baseball player and manager who spent one season in 1981 as a coach for the Seattle Mariners of Major League Baseball. He served as their interim manager for two games, becoming the first (and only) Mexican native to direct an MLB team.

As a manager in Mexico, Reyes led his teams to 12 league pennants and two Caribbean Series titles, and is considered one of the greatest Mexican managers in history.

== Playing career ==
Born in Nacozari de García, Sonora, Reyes was a third baseman, outfielder and pitcher. After playing amateur baseball and being selected to the Mexico junior national team, he abandoned his studies to pursue professional baseball and sign with the Piratas de Campeche of the Mexican Southeast League, where he batted .278 and stole 54 bases in 1964. Reyes was acquired by the Charros de Jalisco of the Mexican League the following year. As a rookie in 1965, he batted .264 with 26 RBI, three home runs and 20 stolen bases. Reyes also played with the Naranjeros de Hermosillo of the Pacific Coast League. However, a leg injury ended his playing career.

== Managerial career ==
Reyes began his managerial career in 1968 with the Mineros de Fresnillo, an affiliate team of the Charros de Jalisco playing in the Mexican Central League. In 1971 he took over as manager of the Charros. That season, he led the team to the Serie del Rey title, defeating the Saraperos de Saltillo in seven games after losing the first three games of the series. He switched in 1974 to the Diablos Rojos del México, whom he managed for 16 years (1974–80; 1983–91) and had only one losing campaign. He led the Diablos Rojos to five Mexican League titles in 1974, 1976, 1985, 1987 and 1988. In 20 years as a Triple-A Mexican League manager, Reyes compiled a winning percentage of .568.

Reyes' one season in MLB was the strike-shortened 1981 campaign. He was named the Mariners' third-base coach by Seattle skipper Maury Wills, whom Reyes had previously served under as a third base coach with the Naranjeros de Hermosillo in 1970–71. When Willis earned a two-game suspension in April, Reyes took over as interim manager for two games against the Minnesota Twins, becoming the first Mexican-born manager in MLB history. Wills was fired early in the year, on May 6, 1981, and replaced by Rene Lachemann. Reyes finished the season, then returned to the Mexican League, where he managed the Azules de Coatzacoalcos for one season in 1982.

In the Mexican Pacific League (LMP), he led the Naranjeros de Hermosillo to three league pennants in 1975, 1976 and 1980, as well as the 1976 Caribbean Series championship title – the first ever for a Mexican team. In 1986, he led the Águilas de Mexicali to an LMP pennant and a Caribbean championship Series title.

Reyes was diagnosed with cancer late in the 1991 season and replaced by Ramón "Diablo" Montoya. Reyes died on 11 November 1991 in Hermosillo, Sonora, at the age of 54. The following year he was inducted into the Mexican Professional Baseball Hall of Fame.

In 2020, Reyes was selected as the manager on the Mexican League Historic Ideal Team by a committee of baseball journalists and historians.

In February 2025, Reyes was selected by a committee of journalists as the manager for the Mexican League Centennial All-Time Team on the occasion of the league's hundredth anniversary.

== Career statistics ==
=== Mexican Pacific League ===
Season	Team	G	AB	R	H	2B	3B	HR	RBI	SB	BB	BA
1963–64	Hermosillo	58	125	12	26	3	0	3	11	2	12	.208
1964–65	Hermosillo	68	239	37	62	10	1	5	16	10	21	.259
1965–66	Hermosillo	80	311	40	82	9	2	8	37	24	27	.264
1966–67	Hermosillo	59	208	20	48	4	0	4	16	8	21	.231
Total		265	883	109	218	26	3	20	80	44	81	.247

Preceded by Bill Mazeroski	Seattle Mariners third base coach 1981	Succeeded by Chuck Cottier
