= Terry Whitfield =

American baseball player (born 1953)

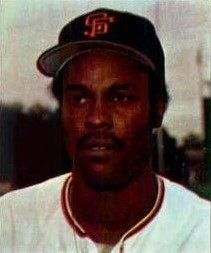
- Outfielder
- Born: January 12, 1953 (age 73); Blythe, California, U.S.
- Batted: Left Threw: Right

Professional debut
- MLB: September 29, 1974, for the New York Yankees
- NPB: April 4, 1981, for the Seibu Lions

Last appearance
- NPB: November 7, 1983, for the Seibu Lions
- MLB: May 23, 1986, for the Los Angeles Dodgers

MLB statistics
- Batting average: .281
- Home runs: 33
- Runs batted in: 179

NPB statistics
- Batting average: .289
- Home runs: 85
- Runs batted in: 280
- Stats at Baseball Reference

Teams
- New York Yankees (1974–1976); San Francisco Giants (1977–1980); Seibu Lions (1981–1983); Los Angeles Dodgers (1984–1986)

Career highlights and awards
- 2× Best Nine Award (1981, 1983)

Terry Bertland Whitfield (born January 12, 1953) is an American former Major League Baseball player. As an outfielder, Whitfield was known more for his batting than his defense, finishing with a career .281 batting average in 1,913 at bats in the major leagues.

== Career ==
In 1971, Whitfield was a first-round draft choice of the New York Yankees, selected 19th overall.

After seven seasons in the major leagues with the New York Yankees and San Francisco Giants, Whitfield moved to Japan. From 1981 to 1983, Terry excelled for the Seibu Lions, putting up high offensive numbers. In 1981, he batted .316 with 22 home runs and 100 runs batted in. That season he won a Best Nine Award, awarded annually to the best player at each position. In 1982, he batted .272 with 25 home runs and 71 runs batted in. And in 1983, he batted .278 with 38 home runs and 109 runs batted in. Whitfield was named as a Pacific League All-Star and won another Best Nine Award, the second time in three years.

The following year, he returned to the major leagues, where he played for three more seasons with the Los Angeles Dodgers from 1984 to 1986.

== Future Pro Baseball and the "Terry-Toss" ==
After his playing career, he opened Future Pro Baseball, a batting cage in Burlingame, California, where he also offers private batting instruction. Whitfield also runs a youth baseball camp and is the inventor of a soft-toss machine called the "Terry-Toss", which can be found at Future Pro Baseball; and as a fan attraction at professional stadiums in California such as Oracle Park in San Francisco and Oakland Coliseum in Oakland.

== Personal life ==
He used to be the head baseball coach at Burlingame High School. He has four children, Charles, Emmett, Eric and Lydia.
