= César Salazar (baseball) =

Mexican baseball player (born 1996)

Houston Astros
- Catcher
- Born: March 15, 1996 (age 30); Hermosillo, Sonora, Mexico
- Bats: Left Throws: Right

MLB debut
- April 2, 2023, for the Houston Astros

MLB statistics (through May 29, 2026)
- Batting average: .189
- Home runs: 0
- Runs batted in: 10
- Stats at Baseball Reference

Teams
- Houston Astros (2023–present)

César Salazar (born March 15, 1996) is a Mexican professional baseball catcher for the Houston Astros of Major League Baseball (MLB).

From Hermosillo, Mexico, Salazar moved to Tucson, Arizona, when he was 16 and later attended the University of Arizona, where he played college baseball for the Wildcats. The Astros selected him in the seventh round of the 2018 MLB draft and he made his Major League Baseball (MLB) debut in 2023.

== Early life ==
César Salazar moved to Arizona from Hermosillo, Sonora, in Mexico when he was 16, and attended Sahuaro High School in Tucson. As a youth, Salazar played soccer and tennis in addition to baseball. As a senior in 2015, he earned the Hal Eustice Award for baseball player of the year after hitting .612 in 62 at bats with 16 runs batted (RBI) and 4 home runs. He played college baseball for the Wildcats at the University of Arizona. While at Arizona, he played collegiate summer baseball for the La Crosse Loggers of the Northwoods League, and in 2017 for the Orleans Firebirds of the Cape Cod Baseball League.

== Career ==
The Houston Astros selected Salazar in the seventh round, 222nd overall, of the 2018 MLB draft. He spent his first professional season playing 36 games between the Low-A Tri-City ValleyCats and Single-A Quad Cities River Bandits. He spent the 2019 season with Quad Cities, hitting .262/.323/.371 with three home runs, 39 runs batted in (RBI), and five stolen bases across 71 games. Salazar did not play in a game in 2020 due to the cancellation of the minor league season because of the COVID-19 pandemic.

Salazar spent the 2021 season split between the High-A Asheville Tourists and Double-A Corpus Christi Hooks, also appearing in one game for the Triple-A Sugar Land Skeeters. In 56 total games, Salazar hit a cumulative .251/.338/.492 with 11 home runs, 32 RBI, and four stolen bases. In 2022, he spent the majority of the year with Corpus Christi, ending the year with Sugar Land, who had rebranded as the Space Cowboys. In 102 games between the two affiliates, he slashed .265/.338/.445 with 16 home runs, 60 RBI, and eight stolen bases.

On March 28, 2023, the Astros announced that Salazar had made the Opening Day roster. He had his contract selected to the 40-man roster on March 30. On April 2, Salazar made his major league debut, appearing as a pinch hitter and drawing a base on balls (BB) in his lone plate appearance that game. Salazar singled on April 16, for his first major league hit off of Josh Sborz in the ninth inning versus the Texas Rangers at Minute Maid Park. Salazar saw sporadic playing time with Houston, going 2-for-14 with a walk in only 10 games. He was optioned to Triple–A Sugar Land on June 5, after the team promoted Grae Kessinger.

Salazar was optioned to Triple–A Sugar Land to begin the 2024 season. On June 19, 2024, Salazar drove in two runs with two hits for his first career multi-hit game in the majors to key a 4–1 win over the Chicago White Sox. In the regular season, Salazar played 12 games for the Astros, batting .320/.387/.400 in 32 plate appearances, with two doubles, five runs scored, and eight RBI; 10 games were played as a catcher.

Salazar was optioned to Triple-A Sugar Land to begin the 2025 season. He appeared in 11 games for Houston during the regular season, going 3-for-13 (.231) with one RBI and two walks.

On March 25, 2026, Salazar was designated for assignment by the Astros after he failed to make the team's Opening Day roster. He cleared waivers and was sent outright to the Triple-A Sugar Land Space Cowboys on March 27. On May 4, the Astros selected Salazar's contract, adding him to their active roster. In nine appearances for the team, he went 1-for-18 (.056) with one RBI and three walks. Salazar was designated for assignment by Houston on June 4. He cleared waivers and was sent outright to Sugar Land on June 6.

On November 2, 2026, the Astros selected Salazar's contract, adding him to their 40–man roster.

== See also ==
- List of Major League Baseball players from Mexico
- List of University of Arizona people
