= Max León =

Mexican baseball player (born 1950)

- Pitcher
- Born: February 4, 1950 (age 76); Acula, Veracruz, Mexico
- Batted: Right Threw: Right

MLB debut
- July 18, 1973, for the Atlanta Braves

Last MLB appearance
- September 10, 1978, for the Atlanta Braves

MLB statistics
- Win–loss record: 14–18
- Earned run average: 3.71
- Strikeouts: 170
- Stats at Baseball Reference

Teams
- Atlanta Braves (1973–1978)

Member of the Mexican Professional

Baseball Hall of Fame
- Induction: 1997

Maximino León Molina (born February 4, 1950) is a Mexican former pitcher in Major League Baseball who played from 1973 through 1978 for the Atlanta Braves. Listed at 5' 10", 145 lb., he batted and threw right-handed.

== MLB career ==
In a six-season MLB career, León posted a 14–18 record with 170 strikeouts and a 3.71 ERA in 162 appearances, including 13 starts, two complete games, one shutout, 13 saves, and 310.1 innings of work.

== Mexican career ==
León had an extensive career in the Mexican League, playing for the Charros de Jalisco, Alacranes de Durango, Piratas de Campeche, Diablos Rojos del México, Tecolotes de Nuevo Laredo, Tabasco, Leones de Yucatán and Rieleros de Aguascalientes in the Liga Mexicana de Beisbol, and the Naranjeros de Hermosillo and Tomateros de Culiacán in the Mexican Pacific League. He was elected to the Mexican Baseball Hall of Fame in 1997.

== See also ==
- List of players from Mexico in Major League Baseball

== Sources ==
- Career statistics from Baseball Reference · Baseball Reference (Minors) · Retrosheet · Baseball Almanac
- Mexican Baseball Hall of Fame
- Retrosheet
