= Manny Bañuelos =

Mexican baseball pitcher (born 1991)

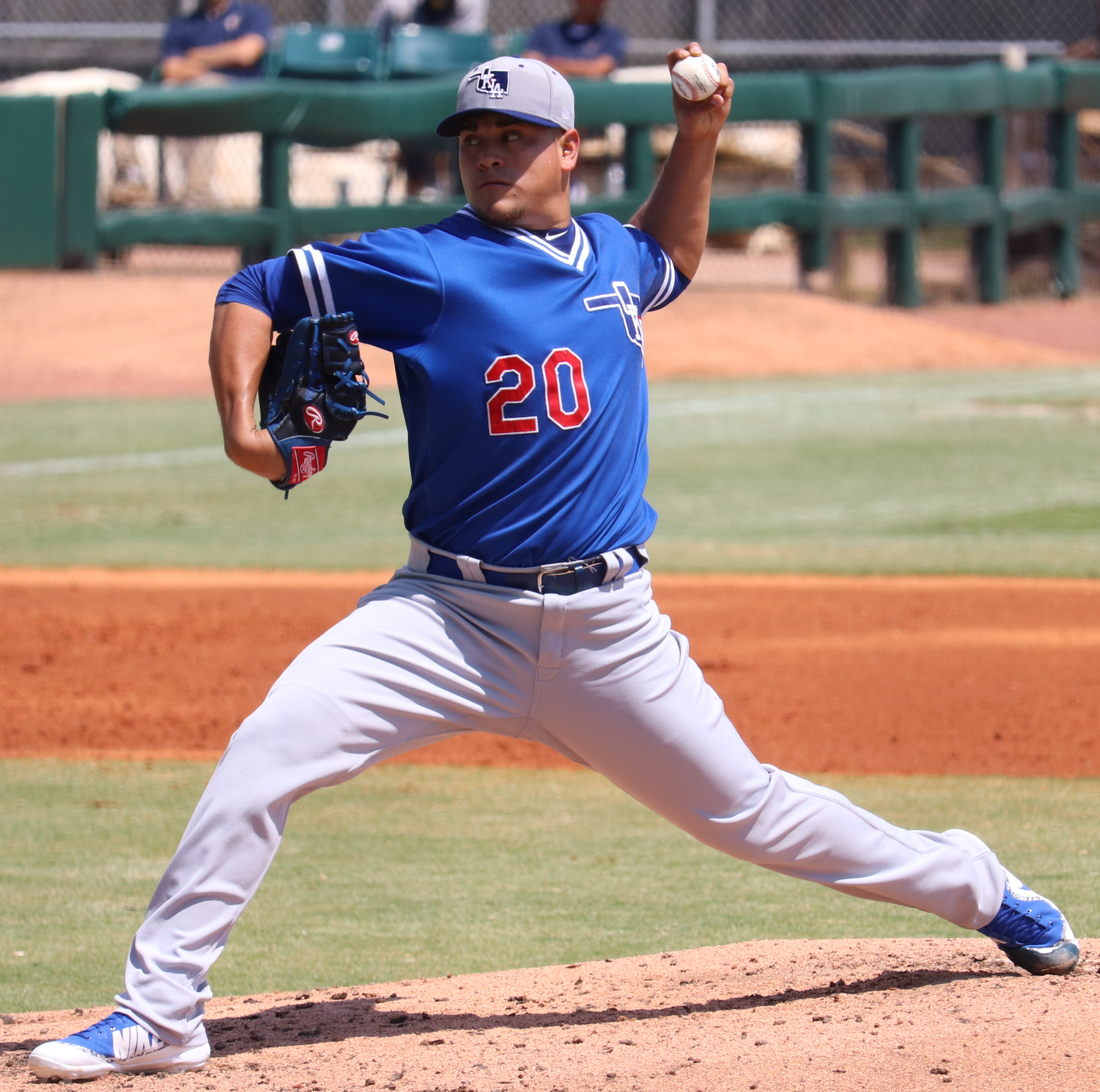
- Bañuelos with the Oklahoma City Dodgers in 2018

Sultanes de Monterrey – No. 92
- Pitcher
- Born: 13 March 1991 (age 35); Gómez Palacio, Durango, Mexico
- Bats: Right Throws: Left

Professional debut
- MLB: 2 July, 2015, for the Atlanta Braves
- CPBL: 9 August, 2020, for the Fubon Guardians
- NPB: 17 May, 2023, for the Tohoku Rakuten Golden Eagles

MLB statistics (through 2022 season)
- Win–loss record: 6–9
- Earned run average: 5.64
- Strikeouts: 105

CPBL statistics (through 2024 season)
- Win–loss record: 16–9
- Earned run average: 3.39
- Strikeouts: 196

NPB statistics (through 2023 season)
- Win–loss record: 0–0
- Earned run average: 81.00
- Strikeouts: 0
- Stats at Baseball Reference

Teams
- Atlanta Braves (2015); Chicago White Sox (2019); Fubon Guardians (2020–2021); New York Yankees (2022); Pittsburgh Pirates (2022); Tohoku Rakuten Golden Eagles (2023); Rakuten Monkeys (2024)

Manuel Bañuelos (born 13 March 1991) is a Mexican professional baseball pitcher for the Sultanes de Monterrey of the Mexican League. He has previously played in Major League Baseball (MLB) for the Atlanta Braves, Chicago White Sox, New York Yankees, and Pittsburgh Pirates. He has also played in the Chinese Professional Baseball League (CPBL) for the Fubon Guardians and Rakuten Monkeys, and in Nippon Professional Baseball (NPB) for the Tohoku Rakuten Golden Eagles.

== Career ==
=== New York Yankees ===
In 2008, the New York Yankees signed four players, including Bañuelos and Alfredo Aceves, from the Mexican League for $450,000. Bañuelos participated in the All-Star Futures Game in 2009.

Bañuelos missed some time during the 2010 season with an appendectomy. In 2010, Bañuelos split time between the High–A Tampa Yankees and the Double–A Trenton Thunder. Bañuelos played for the Phoenix Desert Dogs in the Arizona Fall League after the 2010 season. earning the start in the team's all-star game.

Before the 2010 season, he was rated as the Yankees sixth best prospect according to Baseball America, and in 2011 he was rated as the fourth best. He was also one of the top 50 overall prospects according to MLB.com.

In 2011, Bañuelos was invited to spring training with the Yankees for the first time. Mariano Rivera said that he believed Bañuelos was the best pitching prospect he had seen. He won the James P. Dawson Award, given annually to the best rookie in camp. He began the 2011 season with Trenton was promoted to the Scranton/Wilkes-Barre Yankees of the Triple-A International League on 2 August.

Bañuelos was again invited to spring training in 2012. After struggling through injuries during the 2012 season, Bañuelos was shut down in August. He underwent Tommy John surgery in October and missed the entire 2013 season. He returned to pitch for Scranton/Wilkes-Barre in 2014.

=== Atlanta Braves ===
On 1 January 2015, the Yankees traded Bañuelos to the Atlanta Braves for pitchers David Carpenter and Chasen Shreve. He was invited to spring training, and assigned to the Gwinnett Braves of the International League on 27 March.

The Braves promoted Bañuelos to the major leagues on 2 July 2015. In his debut that day, he pitched 5 2/3 innings and recorded seven strikeouts and no earned runs against the Washington Nationals. He ended the outing by hitting Denard Span and Danny Espinosa and was removed from the game due to cramping and dehydration. Later that month, tests revealed that Bañuelos had a bone spur. He was sent to the minors for rest and rehabilitation, before a second callup in September. The bone spur continued to bother him, and Bañuelos underwent surgery to remove it on 17 September.

In 2016, Bañuelos contended for a spot in the rotation in spring training. However, on 22 March, he began to feel discomfort in his pitching elbow and underwent an MRI that uncovered no irregularities. The team placed Bañuelos in extended spring training until May, when he was cleared to join Gwinnett after a one-game rehab assignment with the low A Rome Braves. On 23 May 2016, he was optioned to Gwinnett. The Braves demoted him to the Mississippi Braves of the Double-A Southern League. Bañuelos was designated for assignment on 12 August.

=== Los Angeles Angels of Anaheim ===
On 21 August 2016, Bañuelos signed a minor league contract with the Los Angeles Angels of Anaheim. In 2017, he pitched for the Salt Lake Bees of the Triple-A Pacific Coast League, making 39 appearances and logging a 5–6 record and 4.93 ERA with 85 strikeouts across 95 innings. Bañuelos elected free agency following the season on 6 November 2017.

=== Los Angeles Dodgers ===
On 17 November 2017, Bañuelos signed a minor league contract with the Los Angeles Dodgers. He was assigned to the Oklahoma City Dodgers of the PCL for the 2018 season and was selected to represent the PCL at the Triple-A All-Star Game and was also selected to the post-season PCL All-Star Team. He made 31 appearances, with 18 starts and posted a 3.73 ERA with nine wins and seven losses.

=== Chicago White Sox ===
On 1 November 2018, the Dodgers traded Bañuelos to the Chicago White Sox in exchange for minor league infielder Justin Yurchak. The White Sox added him to the 40 man roster. The White Sox promoted him to the major leagues as a long reliever and spot starter. He gave up nine runs, all of them earned, to the Boston Red Sox in a single inning during a home game on 4 May 2019, exiting the game with a 30.34 ERA. On 28 October, the White Sox outrighted Bañuelos off of the roster. He elected free agency following the season.

=== Seattle Mariners ===
On 2 February 2020, Bañuelos signed a minor league deal with the Seattle Mariners. He did not play in a game for the organization in 2020 due to the cancellation of the minor league season because of the COVID-19 pandemic. Bañuelos was released by the Mariners organization on 28 May.

=== Fubon Guardians ===
On 18 June 2020, Bañuelos signed with the Fubon Guardians of the Chinese Professional Baseball League. He posted a 6–3 record, 2.60 ERA, and 62 strikeouts across 9 starts in his first season with the club. On 17 December 2020, Bañuelos re-signed with the Guardians for the 2021 season. He was released on 5 July 2021, in order to play with Team Mexico at the 2020 Summer Olympics (contested in 2021). He finished the 2021 season with a 2.94 ERA and 1.33 WHIP over 49 innings pitched.

=== Sultanes de Monterrey ===
On 13 July 2021, Bañuelos signed with the Sultanes de Monterrey of the Mexican League. In 3 games (2 starts) for the Sultanes, Bañuelos posted a 1–0 record and 1.80 ERA with 11 strikeouts over 10 innings of work.

=== New York Yankees (second stint) ===
On 10 January 2022, Bañuelos signed a minor league contract with the New York Yankees organization. He began the 2022 season with the Scranton/Wilkes-Barre RailRiders, and had a 2.35 ERA through 30 2/3 innings. The Yankees promoted him to the major leagues on 26 May.

Bañuelos pitched in four games for the Yankees, recording a 2.16 ERA. The Yankees designated him for assignment on 28 June to make room on the active roster for JP Sears.

=== Pittsburgh Pirates ===
The Yankees traded Bañuelos to the Pittsburgh Pirates for cash considerations on 3 July 2022. On 15 November, Bañuelos was designated for assignment by the Pirates after they protected multiple prospects from the Rule 5 draft. On 18 November, he was non–tendered and became a free agent.

=== Tohoku Rakuten Golden Eagles ===
On 8 December 2022, Bañuelos signed with the Tohoku Rakuten Golden Eagles of Nippon Professional Baseball. He made only one appearance for the team, surrendering six runs on four hits and two walks in just 2/3 of an inning. Bañuelos became a free agent following the season.

=== Rakuten Monkeys ===
On 19 January 2024, Bañuelos signed a one–year contract with the Rakuten Monkeys of the Chinese Professional Baseball League. In 15 starts for Rakuten, he compiled a 9–4 record and 4.15 ERA with 70 strikeouts across 84 2/3 innings pitched. Bañuelos was released by the Monkeys on 17 August.

=== Sultanes de Monterrey (second stint) ===
On 4 March 2025, Bañuelos signed with the Sultanes de Monterrey of the Mexican League. In 18 starts he threw 82 innings going 7–4 with a 4.83 ERA and 74 strikeouts.
