= José Cardona (baseball) =

Mexican baseball player (born 1994)

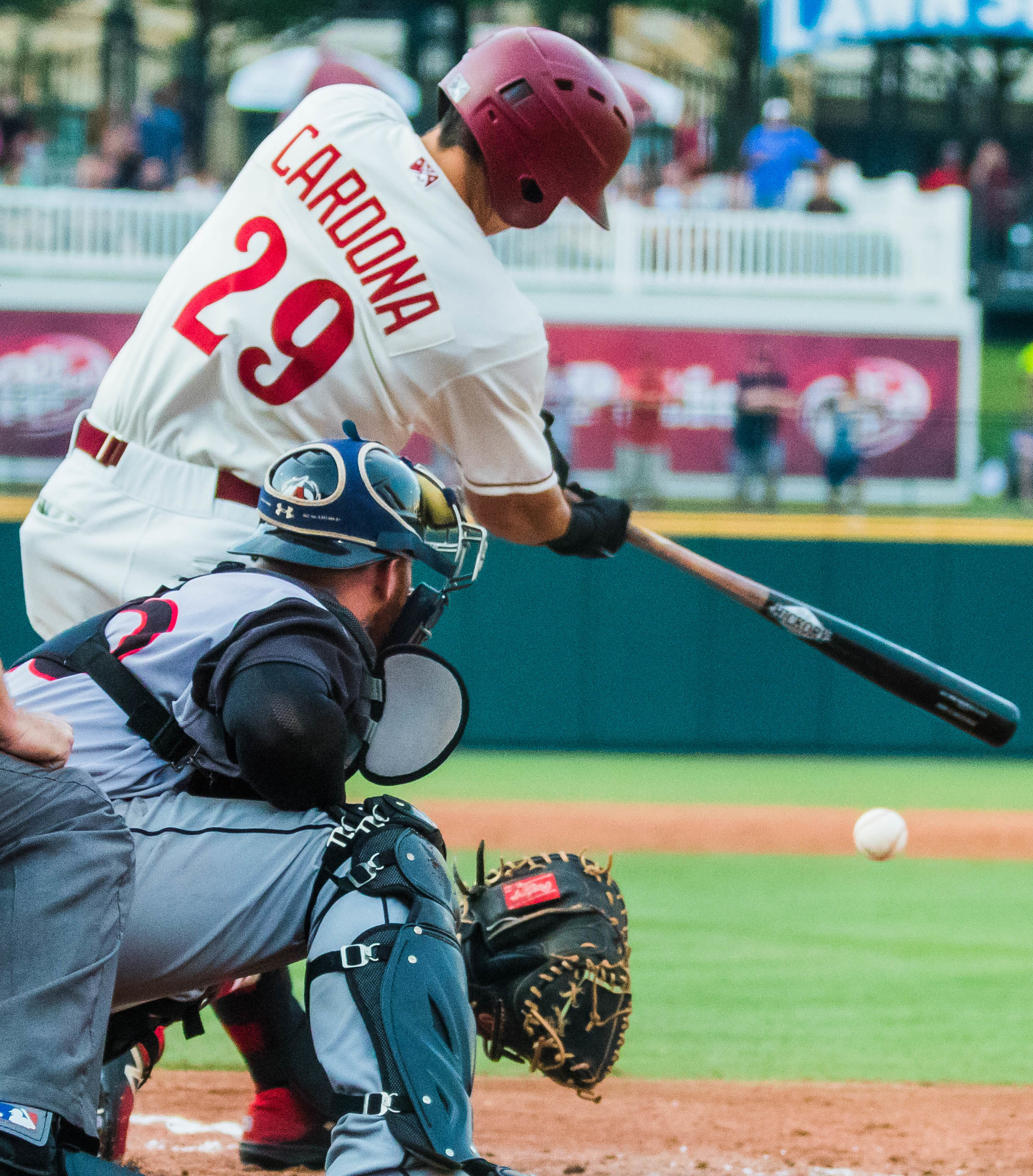
- Cardona at the Texas League All-Star Game in 2017

Sultanes de Monterrey – No. 33
- Outfielder
- Born: March 16, 1994 (age 31); San Nicolás de los Garza, Nuevo León, Mexico
- Bats: Right Throws: Right
Medals
Men's baseball
Representing Mexico
World Baseball Classic
| Bronze medal – third place | 2023 Miami | Team |

José Alejandro Cardona (born March 16, 1994) is a Mexican professional baseball outfielder for the Sultanes de Monterrey of the Mexican League. He signed with the Texas Rangers as an international free agent in 2011. Cardona is listed at 6 feet 1 inch (1.85 m) and 175 pounds (79 kg) and bats and throws right handed.

== Career ==
=== Texas Rangers ===
On March 18, 2011, Cardona signed with the Texas Rangers organization as an international free agent. He made his professional debut with the Dominican Summer League Rangers, and hit .264 in 39 games. He returned to the team in 2012 and slashed .263/.385/.332 in 69 games. In 2013, Cardona played for the DSL Rangers and the rookie-level AZL Rangers, hitting a combined .282/.351/.363 with 1 home run and 19 RBI. For the 2014 season, Cardona split the season between the AZL Rangers, the Low-A Spokane Indians, and the High-A Myrtle Beach Pelicans, batting a cumulative .306/.342/.393 with no home runs and 21 RBI in 47 games between the three teams. The following year, Cardona played in Single-A for the Hickory Crawdads, slashing .254/.317/.380 with career-highs in home runs (10) and RBI (59). In 2016, Cardona was promoted to the High-A High Desert Mavericks, and batted .300/.371/.463 with a career-high 14 home runs and 48 RBI in 101 games for the team. For the 2017 season, Cardona split the year between the Double-A Frisco RoughRiders and the Triple-A Round Rock Express, accumulating a .274/.314/.377 slash line with 7 home runs and 47 RBI between the two teams. In 2018, Cardona again split the year between Round Rock and Frisco, and also played in 3 rehab games with the AZL Rangers, recording a .254/.314/.358 batting line with 8 home runs and 33 RBI in 104 games between the three levels. On November 2, 2018, he elected free agency.

=== Chicago Cubs ===
On December 31, 2018, Cardona signed a minor league contract with the Chicago Cubs organization. He appeared in only 10 games for the rookie-level AZL Cubs before being released by the organization on July 4, 2019.

=== Bravos de León ===
On July 14, 2019, Cardona signed with the Bravos de León of the Mexican League. He finished the year with León, batting .277/.321/.317 with 1 home run and 9 RBI. Cardona did not play in a game in 2020 due to the cancellation of the Mexican League season because of the COVID-19 pandemic.

=== Sultanes de Monterrey ===
On May 19, 2021, Cardona signed with the Sultanes de Monterrey of the Mexican League. In 28 games for Campeche, Cardona slashed .291/.345/.373 with 2 home runs and 7 RBI.

=== Piratas de Campeche ===
On June 27, 2021, Cardona was loaned to the Piratas de Campeche of the Mexican League.

=== Sultanes de Monterrey (second stint) ===
On April 21, 2022, Cardona was returned to the Sultanes de Monterrey of the Mexican League.

== International career ==
Cardona was selected to the Mexico national baseball team at the 2020 Summer Olympics (contested in 2021).
