= Ángel Moreno (baseball) =

Mexican baseball player (born 1955)

- Pitcher
- Born: June 6, 1955 (age 71); Soledad de Doblado, Veracruz, Mexico
- Batted: Left Threw: Left

Professional debut
- MLB: August 15, 1981, for the California Angels
- CPBL: August 26, 1995, for the Uni-President Lions

Last appearance
- MLB: June 25, 1982, for the California Angels
- CPBL: August 20, 1999, for the Wei Chuan Dragons

MLB statistics
- Win–loss record: 4–10
- Earned run average: 4.02
- Strikeouts: 34

CPBL statistics
- Win–loss record: 13–9
- Earned run average: 3.15
- Strikeouts: 134
- Stats at Baseball Reference

Teams
- California Angels (1981–1982); Uni-President Lions (1995); Wei Chuan Dragons (1998–1999)

Career highlights and awards
- 2x Taiwan Series champion (1998-1999)

Member of the Mexican Professional

Baseball Hall of Fame
- Induction: 2012

Angel Veneroso Moreno (born June 6, 1955) is a Mexican former professional baseball pitcher. He played in Major League Baseball (MLB) for the California Angels, and in the Chinese Professional Baseball League (CPBL) for the Uni-President Lions and Wei Chuan Dragons.

== Career ==
Moreno began his career in 1975 with the Rieleros de Aguascalientes of the Mexican League, with whom he played for from 1975 to 1980 before joining the Los Angeles Angels organization. He made his debut on August 15, 1981, and played in 21 total Major League Baseball games, his last being a game on June 25, 1982. He spent 1983 in Minor League Baseball for the Angels and split 1984 in the minors for the Angels and Detroit Tigers. In 1988, Moreno played in 2 games with the Tigres Capitalinos of the Mexican League. After a six-year hiatus from professional baseball, Moreno played in two games with the Uni-President Lions of the Chinese Professional Baseball League in 1995. From 1998 to 1999, Moreno played in 29 games for the Wei Chuan Dragons of the Chinese Professional Baseball League, winning the Taiwan Series in 1998 and 1999. In 2000, Moreno played for the Diablos Rojos del Mexico of the Mexican League, and switched to the Algodoneros de Unión Laguna for the 2001 season. Moreno remained in the LMB in 2002 and 2003, playing for the Rojos del Aguila de Veracruz, also playing for the club in 2005. In 2006, Moreno played 8 games between Veracruz and the Diablos Rojos del Mexico before ending his playing career.

In 2020, Moreno was selected as the starting left-handed pitcher on the Mexican League Historic Ideal Team by a committee of baseball journalists and historians.

In February 2025, Moreno was selected by a committee of journalists as a pitcher for the Mexican League Centennial All-Time Team on the occasion of the league's hundredth anniversary.
