= Juan Jiménez (baseball) =

Dominican baseball player (1949–2008)

- Pitcher
- Born: March 8, 1949; La Vega Province, Dominican Republic
- Died: October 12, 2008 (aged 59); Cleveland, Ohio, U.S.
- Batted: Right Threw: Right

MLB debut
- September 9, 1974, for the Pittsburgh Pirates

Last MLB appearance
- September 29, 1974, for the Pittsburgh Pirates

MLB statistics
- Win–loss record: 0–0
- Earned run average: 6.75
- Strikeouts: 2
- Stats at Baseball Reference

Teams
- Pittsburgh Pirates (1974)

Juan Antonio Jiménez Martes (March 8, 1949 – October 12, 2008) was a Major League Baseball player from the Dominican Republic. His career in the majors was limited to four games as a pitcher with the Pittsburgh Pirates in 1974.

== Sources ==
- Career statistics from Baseball Reference · Retrosheet · Baseball Almanac
