= Juan Castro =

Mexican baseball player (born 1972)

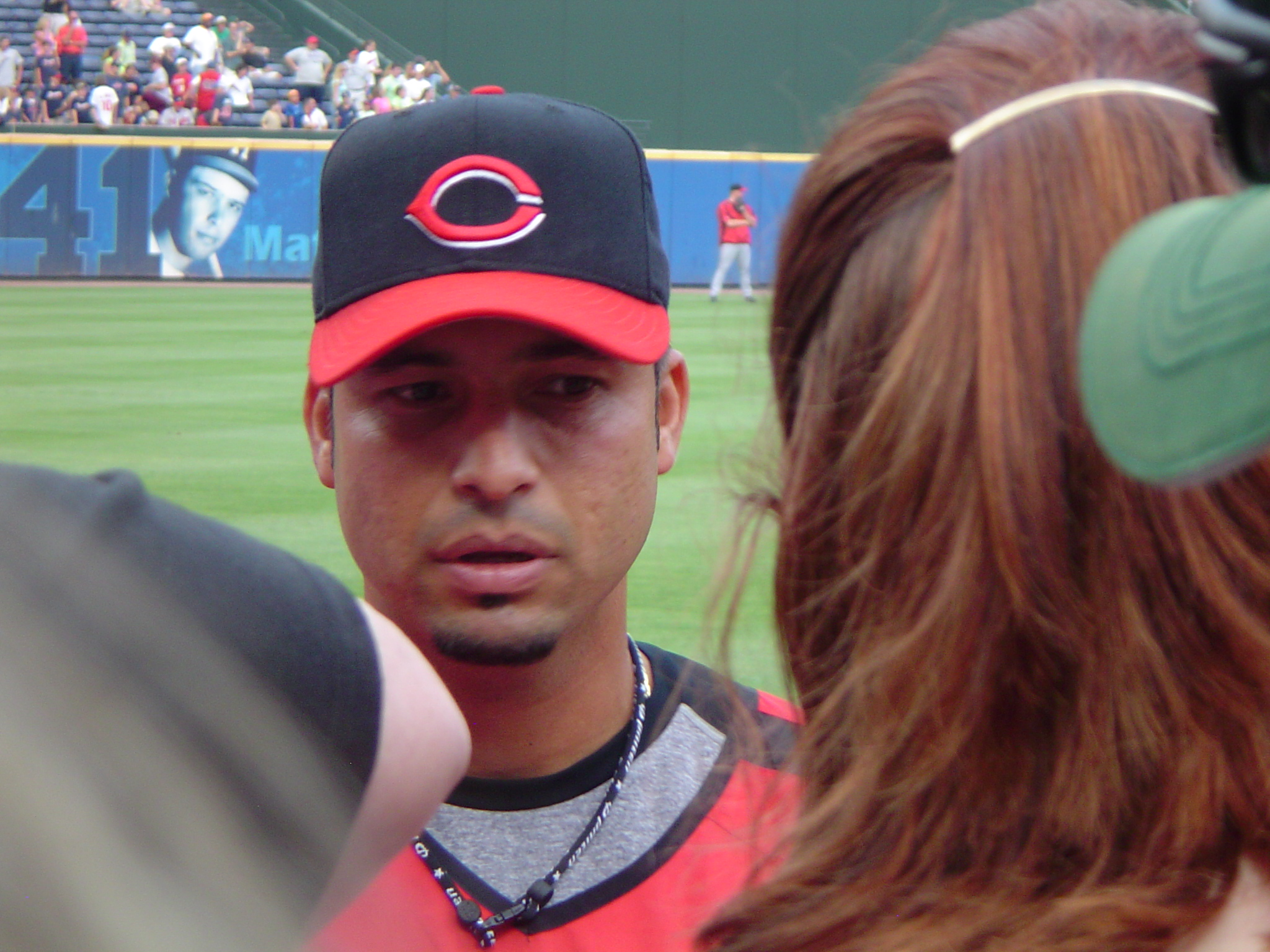
- Castro speaking with the media

Acereros de Monclova – No. 27
- Infielder / Manager
- Born: June 20, 1972 (age 54); Los Mochis, Sinaloa, Mexico
- Batted: Right Threw: Right

MLB debut
- September 2, 1995, for the Los Angeles Dodgers

Last MLB appearance
- June 4, 2011, for the Los Angeles Dodgers

MLB statistics
- Batting average: .229
- Home runs: 36
- Runs batted in: 234
- Stats at Baseball Reference

Teams
- As player: Los Angeles Dodgers (1995–1999); Cincinnati Reds (2000–2004); Minnesota Twins (2005–2006); Cincinnati Reds (2006–2008); Baltimore Orioles (2008); Los Angeles Dodgers (2009); Philadelphia Phillies (2010); Los Angeles Dodgers (2010–2011); As coach: Los Angeles Dodgers (2016–2017); Philadelphia Phillies (2020–2021)

Member of the Mexican Professional

Baseball Hall of Fame
- Induction: 2023

Juan Gabriel Castro (born June 20, 1972) is a Mexican professional baseball coach and former infielder, who played in Major League Baseball (MLB) for the Los Angeles Dodgers, Cincinnati Reds, Minnesota Twins, Baltimore Orioles, and Philadelphia Phillies, during his 17-year big league career. He currently serves as the manager for the Acereros de Monclova of the Mexican League.

Castro was known mainly for his defensive abilities. He was primarily a reserve player. Castro batted and threw right-handed. Following his retirement as a player, Castro joined the Dodgers organization as a coach. During the 2020 and 2021 seasons, Castro was the infield coach for the Phillies.

== Playing career ==
=== Los Angeles Dodgers ===
Castro was signed as an undrafted free agent by the Los Angeles Dodgers in 1991 and began his trek through the minor leagues with the Great Falls Voyagers in 1991. He followed that up with time spent with the Bakersfield Dodgers, San Antonio Missions and Albuquerque Dukes. He was selected to the Texas League All-Star Team while with San Antonio in 1994.

Castro made his major league debut with the Los Angeles Dodgers on September 2, 1995 against the Montreal Expos as a defensive replacement at third base. He got his first at bat on September 11, and recorded his first career hit in his first career start on October 1 against the San Diego Padres.

Playing for the Dodgers was especially meaningful for Castro, as he idolized fellow Mexican and former Dodgers pitching ace Fernando Valenzuela as a child.

Castro played for the Dodgers through the 1999 season. His primary position was shortstop, but he also backed up at second base and third base.

=== Cincinnati Reds ===
After seeing very little playing time during the 1999 season, Castro was traded by the Dodgers to the Cincinnati Reds for Kenny Lutz on April 1, 2000, just before the start of the season.

He played with the Reds from 2000 to 2004, mostly as a utility player. In 2003, he batted .253/.290/.388 with career highs of nine home runs and 33 RBI in 113 games.

=== Minnesota Twins ===
In 2005, Castro was signed by the Minnesota Twins as a backup to rookie shortstop Jason Bartlett. Bartlett struggled and Castro saw increased playing time. He batted .257/.279/.386, and his nine sacrifices were seventh in the league.

=== Cincinnati Reds (second stint) ===
On June 15, 2006, Castro was traded back to the Cincinnati Reds for minor league outfielder Brandon Roberts. On September 25, 2006, the Reds signed him to a two-year, $2 million extension. On April 21, 2008, Castro was designated for assignment by the Reds.

=== Baltimore Orioles ===
On May 2, 2008, he became a free agent, and signed with the Colorado Rockies. After spending some time playing for the Rockies' Triple-A affiliate, the Colorado Springs Sky Sox, he was traded to the Baltimore Orioles on July 19 for infielder Mike McCoy, and was immediately added to the major league roster. Castro started more games at shortstop than any other player in 2008 for the Orioles.

=== Los Angeles Dodgers (second stint) ===
He became a free agent at the end of the season and on January 4, 2009, he signed a minor league contract with an invitation to spring training with his original team, the Los Angeles Dodgers. He spent the season as a backup infielder and then filed for free agency again.

=== Philadelphia Phillies ===
Castro agreed to a one-year deal with the Philadelphia Phillies on November 24. Castro temporarily replaced Jimmy Rollins at shortstop after Rollins suffered a right calf injury. Playing third base, Castro fielded the ground ball and threw to first, completing the 27th and final out of Roy Halladay's perfect game on May 29, 2010.

=== Los Angeles Dodgers (third stint) ===
Castro was released by the Phillies on July 17, 2010, and returned to the Dodgers on a minor-league contract on July 27, 2010. The Dodgers called him up to the Majors on August 11, 2010. He appeared in one game and was designated for assignment on August 21. The Dodgers had intended to recall him when rosters expanded in September, but he chose to remain home to attend to an ailing family member. He became a free agent after the season but re-signed with the Dodgers on a minor league contract that included an invitation to spring training. He was assigned to the AAA Albuquerque Isotopes.

On May 13, 2011, he had his contract purchased by the Dodgers. After appearing in seven games, during which he was 4-for-14 (.286), he was again designated for assignment on June 6.

=== Retirement ===
He retired from baseball on July 10, 2011. Over 17 years in the major leagues, he batted .229/.268/.327.

== Coaching career ==
Castro agreed to a new position as a special assistant to the general manager with the Dodgers, with involvement in player development and talent evaluation. He was also a coach with the Mexico national baseball team in the 2013 World Baseball Classic. Castro was the Dodgers minor league infield coordinator in 2015. In 2016, he was added to the Dodgers major league staff as a quality assurance coach. After the 2017 season, he left the Dodgers to become the director of operations for the Toros de Tijuana in the Mexican League. In 2018, Castro returned to the Mexican Pacific League to manage the Águilas de Mexicali, his second stint as manager of the club. In 2019, Castro was announced as manager for Team Mexico at the 2019 WBSC Premier12 tournament. He joined the Philadelphia Phillies as an infield coach prior to the 2020 season. Castro was dismissed on October 3, 2021, before the Phillies played their final game of the season.

In January 2022, Castro was named manager of the Mexican League team Diablos Rojos del México. In his first season, he led the team to a 50–24 record and a first-place regular-season finish in the LMB South Division. However, the team lost to eventual champions Leones de Yucatán in the Division Championship. Castro returned in 2023 but was fired on May 7 that year after a 6–9 start to the season.

On June 19, 2025, Castro was hired as manager for the Acereros de Monclova of the Mexican League, replacing Homar Rojas.
