= Daniel Garibay =

Mexican baseball player (born 1973)

- Pitcher
- Born: February 14, 1973 (age 53); Maneadero, Baja California, Mexico
- Batted: Left Threw: Left

MLB debut
- April 9, 2000, for the Chicago Cubs

Last MLB appearance
- September 16, 2000, for the Chicago Cubs

MLB statistics
- Games played: 30
- Earned run average: 6.03
- Strikeouts: 46
- Stats at Baseball Reference

Teams
- Chicago Cubs (2000)

Daniel Garibay (born February 14, 1973) is a Mexican former Major League Baseball player from who played pitcher in 2000; he played for the Chicago Cubs. Garibay was 27 when he made his MLB debut for the Cubs. He pitched as both a starter and relief pitcher. He compiled a 6.03 earned run average in 74.2 innings pitched.
