= Dave Sells =

American baseball player (born 1946)

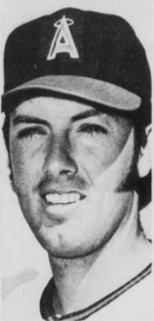
- Relief pitcher
- Born: September 18, 1946 (age 79); Vacaville, California, U.S.
- Batted: Right Threw: Right

MLB debut
- August 2, 1972, for the California Angels

Last MLB appearance
- September 22, 1975, for the Los Angeles Dodgers

MLB statistics
- Win–loss record: 11–7
- Earned run average: 3.90
- Strikeouts: 49
- Stats at Baseball Reference

Teams
- California Angels (1972–1975); Los Angeles Dodgers (1975)

David Wayne Sells (born September 18, 1946) is an American former professional baseball pitcher who played four seasons for the California Angels and Los Angeles Dodgers of Major League Baseball.
