= Narciso Elvira =

Mexican baseball player (1967–2020)

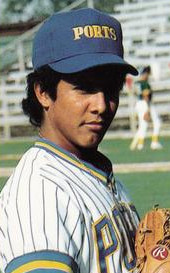
- Elvira in 1988
- Pitcher
- Born: 29 October 1967; Tlalixcoyan, Veracruz, Mexico
- Died: 28 January 2020 (aged 52); Veracruz, Veracruz, Mexico
- Batted: Left Threw: Left

Professional debut
- MLB: 9 September, 1990, for the Milwaukee Brewers
- NPB: 2 April, 2000, for the Osaka Kintetsu Buffaloes
- KBO: 21 May, 2002, for the Samsung Lions

Last appearance
- MLB: 28 September, 1990, for the Milwaukee Brewers
- NPB: 10 May, 2001, for the Osaka Kintetsu Buffaloes
- KBO: 10 May, 2003, for the Samsung Lions

MLB statistics
- Win–loss record: 0–0
- Earned run average: 5.40
- Strikeouts: 6

NPB statistics
- Win–loss record: 7–8
- Earned run average: 4.79
- Strikeouts: 89

KBO statistics
- Win–loss record: 14–7
- Earned run average: 3.12
- Strikeouts: 132
- Stats at Baseball Reference

Teams
- Milwaukee Brewers (1990); Osaka Kintetsu Buffaloes (2000–2001); Samsung Lions (2002–2003)

Narciso Chicho Delgado Elvira (29 October 1967 – 28 January 2020) was a Mexican professional baseball pitcher.

Elvira was purchased by the Milwaukee Brewers from the Mexican League in 1986. He played his first year in 1987 with the Class A Beloit Brewers of the Midwest League, Class A Stockton Ports of the California League in 1988, split time with Triple A El Paso Diablos of the Texas League and returning to Class A ball with the Ports in 1989.

He played with the team at the Major League level in 1990 for four games in 5 innings and spent the rest of year in the minors with the Diablos and Beloit Brewers.

Elvira never returned to MLB after 1990 and spent time with Triple A Denver Zephyrs of the American Association in 1991, Triple A Oklahoma City 89ers of the Pacific Coast League (PCL) in 1992. After a long absence he returned with the then Dodgers Triple A affiliate Albuquerque Dukes of the PCL from 1996 to 1997 and after a brief absence again left for Japan to play professional baseball with the Osaka Kintetsu Buffaloes of the then Japan Pacific League from 2000 to 2001. From 2002 to 2003 he split his time between Samsung Lions of professional Korea Baseball Organization and Campeche Piratas of the Mexican League. He remained with the Piratas from 2004 to 2006. After his third break from baseball he returned in 2009 to play in the Mexican League for Petroleros de Minatitlan before retiring from playing.

While playing for the Buffaloes, Elvira pitched a no-hitter on 20 June 2000. He is the only Mexican to do so in the Nippon Professional Baseball League.

Elvira and his son were shot and killed on 28 January 2020 in Veracruz.
