= Francisco Barrios =

Mexican baseball player (1953–1982)

- Pitcher
- Born: June 10, 1953; Hermosillo, Sonora, Mexico
- Died: April 9, 1982 (aged 28); Hermosillo, Sonora, Mexico
- Batted: Right Threw: Right

MLB debut
- August 18, 1974, for the Chicago White Sox

Last MLB appearance
- June 3, 1981, for the Chicago White Sox

MLB statistics
- Win–loss record: 38–38
- Earned run average: 4.15
- Strikeouts: 323
- Stats at Baseball Reference

Teams
- Chicago White Sox (1974, 1976–1981)

Career highlights and awards
- Mexican League Rookie of the Year Award (1973); Pitched combined no-hitter on July 28, 1976

Francisco Javier Barrios Jiménez (June 10, 1953 – April 9, 1982) was a Mexican starting pitcher in Major League Baseball (MLB) who played for the Chicago White Sox.

== Career ==
Barrios was acquired from the Charros de Jalisco of the Mexican League for shortstop Rudy Hernández, and played his entire major league career with the White Sox. He joined the starting rotation in 1976, and on July 28 combined with Blue Moon Odom to no-hit the Oakland Athletics, 2–1, at the Coliseum. His most productive season came in 1977, when he recorded career-numbers with 14 wins, 119 strikeouts, nine complete games, and 231 innings pitched. Despite his 9–15 mark in 1978, he threw two shutouts with a 3.82 ERA in a career-high 33 starts. His 1979 season ended on September 25 when he underwent rotator cuff surgery.

Barrios had a 1–3 record as a spot starter until being placed on the disabled list on June 4 because of a swollen right elbow just before the 1981 MLB strike. During the work stoppage on June 24, he was charged with one count of cocaine possession and arrested for disorderly conduct at a Division Street bar owned at the time by Doug Buffone. He voluntarily entered a Chicago area drug and alcohol rehabilitation center on July 3. He was released by the White Sox on September 1 after eight starts with a 3.96 ERA in 36 1/3 innings.

Barrios enjoyed a good winter season in the Mexican Pacific League and was ready to sign a contract with the Milwaukee Brewers for the 1982 season, when he died of a heart attack at the age of 28 on April 9.

== See also ==
- List of Major League Baseball no-hitters
- List of players from Mexico in Major League Baseball
- List of baseball players who died during their careers

Preceded by Larry Dierker	No-hit game July 28, 1976 (with Blue Moon Odom)	Succeeded by John Candelaria
