= Ed Acosta =

Panamanian baseball player (1944–2025)

- Pitcher
- Born: March 9, 1944; Boquete, Panama
- Died: September 18, 2025 (aged 81); Mission Viejo, California, U.S.
- Batted: Right Threw: Right

MLB debut
- September 7, 1970, for the Pittsburgh Pirates

Last MLB appearance
- October 4, 1972, for the San Diego Padres

MLB statistics
- Win–loss record: 6–9
- Earned run average: 4.05
- Strikeouts: 70
- Stats at Baseball Reference

Teams
- Pittsburgh Pirates (1970); San Diego Padres (1971–1972)

Eduardo Elixbet Acosta (March 9, 1944 – September 18, 2025) was an American Major League Baseball pitcher who played for three seasons. He was signed by the Houston Astros before the 1967 season and played for the Pittsburgh Pirates in 1970 and the San Diego Padres from 1971 to 1972.

Acosta died in Los Angeles, California on September 18, 2025, at the age of 81.

== See also ==
- List of Major League Baseball players from Panama
