= Celerino Sánchez =

Mexican baseball player (1944-1992)

- Third baseman
- Born: 3 February 1944; El Guayabal, Veracruz, Mexico
- Died: 1 May 1992 (aged 48); León, Guanajuato, Mexico
- Batted: Right Threw: Right

MLB debut
- June 13, 1972, for the New York Yankees

Last MLB appearance
- September 30, 1973, for the New York Yankees

MLB statistics
- Batting average: .242
- Home runs: 1
- RBIs: 31
- Stats at Baseball Reference

Teams
- New York Yankees (1972–1973)

Career highlights and awards
- Mexican League Triple Crown, 1966; Caribbean Baseball Hall of Fame (2006)

Member of the Mexican Professional

Baseball Hall of Fame
- Induction: 1994

Celerino Sánchez Pérez (3 February 1944 – 1 May 1992) was a Mexican professional baseball player. He was a third baseman for two seasons in Major League Baseball (MLB) for the New York Yankees.

== Career ==
Sánchez starred in the Mexican Baseball League from 1964 to 1971, with brief stints in the St. Louis Cardinals and Houston Astros organizations. He batted .368 with fifteen home runs and 79 runs batted in in 1971 with the Tigres del México to catch the eye of the New York Yankees. The Yankees sent fellow infielder Ossie Chavarria to Tigres del México for Sánchez during the off season. In his first spring training at bat, Sánchez hit a home run.

Despite Sánchez's early heroics, Yankees manager Ralph Houk handed the starting third base job to Rich McKinney, whom the Yankees had acquired shortly before Sánchez, and had primarily played second base with the Chicago White Sox.

McKinney had trouble adjusting to his new position, and was slashing .216/.263/.252 with just one home run and five RBIs through the end of May. Meanwhile Sánchez slashed .327/.358/.491 with three home runs and 28 RBIs in 43 games with the Yankees' triple A affiliate, the Syracuse Chiefs to earn a call up to the Yankees in mid June. After a slow start, Sánchez picked up steam, batting .400 over eleven games leading into the All-Star break to assumed the Yankees regular third base job for the rest of the year.

Following the 1972 season, the Yankees' acquired star third baseman Graig Nettles from the Cleveland Indians, relegating Sánchez to a backup role. His only career home run was a pinch hit shot against Mickey Scott of the Baltimore Orioles on May 12, 1973 at Yankee Stadium.

Sánchez resigned with the Yankees for the 1974 season hoping to win the shortstop job, but failed to make the team out of Spring training.

He returned to the Mexican Leagues in 1976, where he played for several more years before retiring in 1979. Sánchez died in a car accident on May 1, 1992 at just 48 years old.

He was elected to the Mexican Professional Baseball Hall of Fame in 1994, and the Caribbean Baseball Hall of Fame in 2006.
