= Sultanes de Monterrey =

Mexican professional baseball team

Logo	Cap insignia

Information
- League: Mexican League (1939–present); Mexican Pacific League (2019–2025)
- Location: Monterrey, Nuevo León
- Ballpark: Walmart Park
- Founded: 1939
- Nickname(s): Fantasmas Grises (Gray Ghosts); Los Muchachos del Regreso (The Comeback Boys)
- League championships: 10 (1943, 1947, 1948, 1949, 1962, 1991, 1995, 1996, 2007, F2018)
- Division championships: 13 (1986, 1991, 1994, 1995, 1996, 2006, 2007, 2008, 2013, S2018, F2018, 2022, 2024)
- Former name: Industriales de Monterrey (1942–1948); Carta Blanca (1939–1941)
- Former ballparks: Parque Cuauhtémoc; Parque Cuauhtémoc y Famosa
- Colors: Navy blue, white, and red
- Mascot: Perro Sultán (Sultan Dog)
- Ownership: José Maiz García (50%); Grupo Multimedios (50%)
- President: José Maiz García
- Manager: Henry Blanco
- Website: www.sultanes.com.mx

Current uniforms
Home	Away

The Sultanes de Monterrey (English: Monterrey Sultans) are a professional baseball club in the Mexican League (LMB) based in Monterrey, Nuevo León. Established in 1939 as Carta Blanca, the Sultanes have won ten LMB titles, most recently in 2018. From 2019 to 2025, the club also fielded a team in the Mexican Pacific League (LMP), which plays a winter league schedule; they were the easternmost team to participate in the LMP.

== History ==
=== Carta Blanca (1939–1941) ===
The team in 1939 was called Carta Blanca

The team was formed in 1939, as Carta Blanca, a local beer brand, owned by Cervecería Cuauhtémoc Moctezuma which owned the team. Carta Blanca played its first game on 25 March 1939, defeating Cuauhtémoc y Famosa 3–2 in an exhibition game. It made its Mexican League debut on 1 April 1939 against the Rojos del Águila de Veracruz, losing 5–6. On 20 May 1939, the team played its first professional game in Monterrey, facing the Cafeteros de Córdoba at Parque Cuauhtémoc, losing 1–3. The team finished fifth with a 31–29 record, led player-managers Guillermo Ornelas and Gaudencio Guerra.

In 1940 and 1941, the team was managed by Chile Gómez, who also appeared on the field as a player. Carta Blanca finished third in 1940 with a record of 52–41, but its performance declined the following season, when it finished last among six teams with a 43–59 record.

=== Industriales de Monterrey (1942–1948) ===
The team was renamed to Industriales in 1942 and hired Cuban Lázaro Salazar as player-manager. It was during this time when the club won its first three Mexican League championships in 1943, 1947 and 1948, all under Salazar. In 1943, there were no playoffs, so the team that finished first at the end of the season would be crowned champion; Monterrey finished first with a 53–37 record, ahead Unión Laguna by half a game, winning their first Mexican League title.

=== Sultanes de Monterrey (1949–present) ===
In 1949, the club changed its nickname again to their current one: Sultanes. The team was also known as the Gray Ghosts. The team won its first championship in 1943. In total, the Sultanes have collected ten championships (1943, 1947, 1948, 1949, 1962, 1991, 1995, 1996, 2007. and 2018), including three straight (1947–1949) under the legendary Cuban manager Lázaro Salazar. During the seasons from 1989 to 1994 both the Sultanes and the Industriales played in the Mexican League for Monterrey.

=== Mexican Pacific League ===
On 27 January 2019, during a rally at the Estadio Francisco Carranza Limón in Guasave, Sinaloa, Mexican President Andrés Manuel López Obrador announced that the Algodoneros de Guasave would return to compete in the Mexican Pacific League beginning in the 2019–20 winter season. The Sultanes were announced as the other team to join the league, bringing the total number of LMP teams to ten. A draft was later held to fill the team, making it a different roster than the one that competes in the Summer league.

In April 2025, it was announced that the Sultanes' LMP franchise would relocate to Nayarit, marking the end of the Sultanes' participation in the Mexican Pacific League after six seasons.

== Roster ==
Sultanes de Monterrey roster
Players		Coaches/Other
Pitchers: 54 (Dominican Republic) Ronaldo Alesandro; 92 (Mexico) Manny Bañuelos; 66 (Mexico) Alonso Becerra; 10 (Dominican Republic) Miguel Castro; 80 (Mexico) Daniel Cruz; 75 (United States) Chris Ellis; 97 (Dominican Republic) Junior Fernández; 43 (Mexico) Juan Gámez; 46 (Cuba) Alejandro Hernández; 12 (United States) Jacob Higginbotham; 73 (United States) Daniel Mengden; 44 (Dominican Republic) Oliver Ortega; 41 (Venezuela) Jesús Pirela; 99 (United States) Joe Riley; 48 (Dominican Republic) Richard Rodríguez; 89 (Mexico) André Sánchez ∞; 61 (United States) Justus Sheffield ∞; 28 (Mexico) Alexis Vera ∞; 15 (United States) Jared Wetherbee	Catchers: 39 (Venezuela) Ricardo Genovés; 38 (Venezuela) Omar Narváez; 40 (Mexico) Omar Rentería ∞; 8 (Mexico) Carlos Soto; Infielders: 65 (Dominican Republic) Maikel Franco; 29 (Venezuela) Yonny Hernández; 58 (United States) Josh Lester; 3 (Mexico) Johan López; 25 (Mexico) Víctor Mendoza; 4 (Dominican Republic) Gustavo Núñez; 19 (Mexico) Ramiro Peña; 2 (Mexico) Javier Salazar; 62 (Mexico) Luis Santos; Outfielders: 16 (Mexico) Alonso Becerra; 30 (Dominican Republic) Socrates Brito; 33 (Mexico) José Cardona; 79 (Mexico) Héctor Jacquez; 45 (Colombia) Harold Ramírez	Manager: -- (Venezuela) Henry Blanco; Coaches: 73 (Mexico) Erick Rodríguez (bench); -- (Puerto Rico) Ricky Bones(pitching); 31 (Mexico) Juan Carlos Canizales (hitting); 32 (Mexico) Remigio Diaz (first base); 77 (Mexico) Alberto Manrique (bullpen); 56 (Mexico) Óscar Villarreal (bullpen); 7-day injured list; ~ Development list; # Rehab assignment; ∞ Reserve list; ‡ Restricted list; § Suspended list; † Temporarily inactive list; Roster updated 21 October 2026; Transactions; → More rosters: MiLB • Mexican League

=== Retired numbers ===
The Sultanes de Monterrey have retired the following numbers:

José; Maíz Mier; President; 1982–2006; Retired; 22 March 2007	Daniel; Ríos; P 1941–1952; Retired; 21 May 1995	Epitacio Torres; RF; 1939–1956; Retired; 16 May 1994	Vinicio; García; 2B; 1960–1965; Retired; 11 June 1999	Felipe Montemayor; CF; 1964–1966; Retired; 20 May 2006	Lázaro Salazar; Manager; 1942–1951; Retired; 21 May 1998	Miguel; Flores; 2B; 1995–2009; Retired; 10 July 2011	Héctor; Espino; 1B; 1962–1970; Retired; 18 June 1996	Arturo González; P 1976–1984; Retired; 25 May 1997

== Championships ==
Season	Manager	Opponent	Series score	Record
1943	(Cuba) Lázaro Salazar	No final series		53–37
1947	(Cuba) Lázaro Salazar	No final series		70–47
1948	(Cuba) Lázaro Salazar	No final series		50–35
1949	(Cuba) Lázaro Salazar	Unión Laguna de Torreón	4–0	56–33
1962	(Cuba) Clemente Carreras	No final series		77–53
1991	(Mexico) Aurelio Rodríguez	Diablos Rojos del México	4–3	94–44
1995	(United States) Derek Bryant	Diablos Rojos del México	4–0	77–52
1996	(United States) Derek Bryant	Diablos Rojos del México	4–1	94–38
2007	(Dominican Republic) Félix Fermín	Leones de Yucatán	4–3	81-44
2018	(Panama) Roberto Kelly	Guerreros de Oaxaca	4–2	46–29
Total championships			10	

== Average home league attendance ==
Season	Total attendance	Home average	Ref.
2005	374,630	7,068	
2006	977,508	17,773	
2007	491,630	9,640	
2008	658,494	12,424	
2009	204,701	4,178	
2010	356,757	6,731	
2011	430,421	8,440	
2012	645,303	11,321	
2013	590,694	11,145	
2014	687,642	11,856	
2015	517,235	9,404	
2016	690,309	12,784	
2017	659,791	11,575	
2018	563,297	10,058	
2019	556,872	9,770	
2020	Season cancelled due to the COVID-19 pandemic		
2021	149,011	4,657	
2022	382,048	8,490	
2023	371,262	8,438	

The Sultanes led LMB in average per game attendance every season from 2012 through 2017.

== See also ==
- Sultanes de Monterrey players
