= Sergio Robles =

Mexican baseball player (born 1946)

- Catcher
- Born: April 16, 1946 (age 80); Magdalena de Kino, Sonora, Mexico
- Batted: Right Threw: Right

MLB debut
- August 27, 1972, for the Baltimore Orioles

Last MLB appearance
- September 13, 1976, for the Los Angeles Dodgers

MLB statistics
- Batting average: .095
- Home runs: 0
- Runs batted in: 0
- Stats at Baseball Reference

Teams
- Baltimore Orioles (1972–1973); Los Angeles Dodgers (1976)

Member of the Mexican Professional

Baseball Hall of Fame
- Induction: 2006

Sergio Robles Valenzuela (born April 16, 1946) is a Mexican former catcher in Major League Baseball from the northern Mexican town of Magdalena de Kino. He won five Mexican Pacific League championships over his 19 seasons with the Naranjeros de Hermosillo. Later, He played in 16 games over three seasons (1972, 1973, 1976) for the Baltimore Orioles and Los Angeles Dodgers. He had been acquired along with Doyle Alexander, Bob O'Brien and Royle Stillman by the Orioles from the Dodgers for Frank Robinson and Pete Richert at the Winter Meetings on December 2, 1971. In his native México he is known as Kaliman after a Mexican comic book hero. He was enshrined in his hometown of Magdalena by a statue that was unveiled in 2018 outside of the Estadio Padre Kino, a 3,000-seat baseball stadium that serves as the home of the amateur Membrilleros de Magdalena.
