= Luis Aparicio Sr. =

Venezuelan baseball player

Luis Aparicio Ortega
- Shortstop / Coach / Manager
- Born: August 28, 1912; Maracaibo, Zulia, Venezuela
- Died: January 1, 1971 (aged 58); Maracaibo, Zulia, Venezuela
- Batted: Right Threw: Right

LVBP debut
- 1946, for the Navegantes del Magallanes

Last LVBP appearance
- 1953, for the Gavilanes de Maracaibo

Teams
- Navegantes del Magallanes (1946); Sabios de Vargas (1947-1952); Gavilanes de Maracaibo (1953)

Career highlights and awards
- Collected both the first hit and run scored in Venezuelan League history (Jan 12, 1946); First Venezuelan professional baseball player with a foreign contract (Licey Tigers, Dominican Republic) (1934)

Member of the Venezuelan

Baseball Hall of Fame
- Induction: 2005
Medals
Men's baseball
Representing Venezuela
Amateur World Series
Bronze medal – third place	1942 Havana	Team

Luis Aparicio Ortega (August 28, 1912 – January 1, 1971) was a Venezuelan professional baseball personality for 40 years, serving as a player, coach, field manager, and club organizer. Aparicio was the father of National Baseball Hall of Fame member Luis Aparicio; both father and son were inducted into the Venezuelan Baseball Hall of Fame. To distinguish him from his son, the elder Aparicio is known by the nickname El Grande (lit. "The Elder" or "The Great One").

== Baseball career ==
Born and raised in Maracaibo, Zulia, Aparicio came from a family whose name is synonymous with baseball in Venezuela. He was the son of Leónidas Aparicio and Adelina Ortega, who introduced their children to sport activities within the local community at an early age. As a result, the young Luis excelled both in soccer and track and field before deciding to play baseball. His older brother Ernesto developed into a successful baseball manager, coach and team owner, while his son Luis Jr. spent 18 years in the Major Leagues and is a Baseball Hall of Fame member.

Aparicio was never a dominant hitter, but his defense was what made him successful. He is regarded as a notable Venezuelan shortstop of his era. He was known for his range, smooth hands, and a quick and strong arm, while showing his ability to make plays on the move and throw base runners out from all over the infield. He has been described as an intelligent player that possessed exceptional baseball sense and instincts to anticipate the play.

Engaged in any sport activities as a teenager, Aparicio Sr. was introduced to the soccer environment in the late 1920s, playing as a forward for several First Division clubs of Caracas and Maracaibo, but devoted himself to baseball when he was hired to play in the National Baseball Series tournament, where he performed for seven different teams in eleven seasons spanning 1931–1945. A few years before, in 1928, he had founded with his brother Ernesto the baseball team Los Muchachos (The Boys), which was later renamed Gavilanes de Maracaibo. Over time, the Gavilanes (Sparrowhawks) would become the most successful team in Zulian Professional Baseball annals, winning 15 of 20 summer tournaments held between 1932 and 1957.

In between, Aparicio was signed by the Tigres del Licey club of the now extinct Dominican Republic Summer League in 1934, becoming the first Venezuelan ballplayer to play professionally outside of his country. He also gained international exposure as a member of the Venezuela national baseball team during the 1942 Baseball World Cup tournament played in Havana, Cuba.

Although he never appeared in a Major League game, Aparicio received an offer to play for the Washington Senators in 1938 that he could not achieve. At the time, he was walking in the aftermath of a hernia surgery and subsequent operations needed to address complications from previous hernia surgeries.

Following his recovery, Aparicio joined the Navegantes del Magallanes club to become a founding member of the Venezuelan Professional Baseball League in its inaugural season. The first game of the new league took place on Saturday 12 January 1946 at Cervecería Caracas Stadium, as Magallanes defeated the Patriotas de Venezuela, 5–2, behind a strong pitching performance by big leaguer Alejandro Carrasquel. The first batter in that game was Aparicio, who promptly lined a solid base hit into right field and later scored the first run, becoming the first player to collect both the first hit and run scored in Venezuelan League history.

Aparicio became part of the Sabios de Vargas for the next six campaigns, hitting a career-high .322 average in the 1946–47 season, while leading his team to the Championship title. He retired from active play with Gavilanes in 1953. In a symbolic gesture during the team's home opener, he led off as the first hitter of the game. Aparicio turned to face Howie Fox of the Lácteos de Pastora, then, after taking the first pitch, had Aparicio Jr. take his place at bat. This was the first professional appearance of Aparicio Jr., who previously had served as batboy for his father's team.

Aparicio played until the age of 41, and while his final batting average of .269 may not seem like top-10 material, he did it at a time when it was a respectable average for a middle infielder, let alone an outstanding defensive shortstop. Although his legacy at his position has been carried on from generation to generation of Venezuelan shortstops, through Chico Carrasquel, the first-ever Latin player to appear in an MLB All-Star Game, and later by his son Luis, Dave Concepción, Ozzie Guillén, Omar Vizquel, Asdrúbal Cabrera and Elvis Andrus, among others.

"What made the old shortstop had no comparison", Carrasquel explained in a 1971 interview to Diario Panorama. "He was a genius in that position, always advised every rookie, and they corrected the mistakes quickly. That gave rise to cheer and excel in equal measure as I did", he added.

Meanwhile, for the young Aparicio his father was always a strong inspiration in his life. From the age of 12, he displayed the grace and elegance that he learned from him, and later developed the tricks of shortstop play from his eventual mentor Carrasquel, who recommended him to Chicago White Sox General manager Frank Lane.

Aparicio Jr. also recalls his mother washing baseball uniforms for his youth team and talking at home about baseball all day. Asked what he would say about his father, the Hall of Fame member said: "When my dad asked me to be always a number one, I always kept that on my mind. I think I didn't disappoint him ... I wanted him to be proud of me, and I know he definitely was. That's the achievement of my life."

According to baseball historian Javier González, Mr. Aparicio always encouraged the youth to play at the highest level in baseball, in being as good as they could be and playing at various infield spots, but most importantly at shortstop. "He opened the doors for many ballplayers would love to play in that position", he stated categorically.

== Career statistics ==
Season	Team	G	AB	R	H	2B	3B	HR	RBI	BB	SO	SB	BA
1946	Magallanes	32	133	29	37	2	2	1	6	19		6	.278
1946–47	Vargas	30	121	25	39	5	1	0	9	15	7	3	.322
1947–48	Vargas	37	148	30	46	7	3	2	20	23		0	.311
1948–49	Vargas	14	58	6	10	2	0	0	1	7		2	.172
1949–50	Vargas	46	191	17	44	12	1	0	22	19	10	1	.230
1950–51	Vargas	44	177	31	51	9	2	0	18			4	.288
1951–52	Magallanes	46	126	16	26	3	0	0	12			7	.206
1953–54	Gavilanes	13	25	2	6	0	1	0	0			0	.240
Total		262	979	156	259	40	10	3	88		23	23	.265

== Later life and legacy ==
Retired from active play, Aparicio coached for Gavilanes and later founded the Rapiños de Occidente club in 1957, following a disagreement with his brother Ernesto, which forced him leave the family organization. From there he departed not from his son, and went to his side with the Tiburones de La Guaira and the Águilas del Zulia, serving as the Águilas' manager for their inaugural 1969–70 season.

Aparicio died in 1971 at the age of 58, after suffering a heart attack. Through the years, he has been honored various times for his numerous contributions to Venezuelan baseball.

The Estadio Luis Aparicio El Grande is named after him in his birthplace Maracaibo. Then, in 2005 he was enshrined into the Venezuelan Baseball Hall of Fame and Museum as part of its second class.

In addition, the 2012–13 Venezuelan Professional Baseball League tournament was played in honour of the centenary of his birthday.
