= Daniel Canónico =

Venezuelan baseball player (1916–1975)

- Illustration realized by Francisco Maduro
- Pitcher / Manager
- Born: February 3, 1916; Guarenas, Miranda, Venezuela
- Died: August 20, 1975 (aged 59); Barquisimeto, Lara, Venezuela
- Batted: Right Threw: Right

Career highlights and awards
- Venezuela Sports Hall of Fame (1971); 1941 Amateur World Series champion team Permanent Display at Venezuelan Baseball Hall of Fame and Museum (2006)

Member of the Venezuelan

Baseball Hall of Fame
- Induction: 2006 (as part of 1941 AWS team)
Medals
Representing Venezuela
Men's baseball
Baseball World Cup
Gold medal – first place	1941 Havana	Team
Bronze medal – third place	1942 Havana	Team

Daniel Canónico (February 3, 1916 – August 20, 1975) was a Venezuelan professional baseball right handed pitcher. His friends and fans affectionately called him Chino, a moniker that he proudly used throughout his life.

Daniel Canónico is best known as the man who anchored the pitching staff for the Venezuela national baseball team which captured the 1941 Amateur World Series in Havana. A short, stocky sort of pitcher with a wicked curveball, Canónico became an instant celebrity in his country, as he was undefeated through five games in the tournament, including the series-tying and deciding games, both against host country Cuba, while placing Venezuela for the very first time among the world baseball elite. But plagued by shoulder and elbow ailments for most of his career, he was solid yet unspectacular over almost two decades in Venezuelan baseball. After retiring, he became a successful manager and coach in amateur baseball.

== Early life ==
Canónico was born in Guarenas, Miranda and was raised in Caracas. He was one of two sons of Agostino Canónico, an Italian musician and composer. Mr. Canónico taught his sons music theory at an early age and encouraged them to experiment with diverse instruments. As a young man, Daniel was leading his own little group playing popular tunes and then tried to pursue a professional career as a drummer, but he was not destined to be one of them, as he grew up playing sandlot ball and his passion for baseball led him to neglect his musical education. in contrast, his brother Benito became a notable composer, musician, orchestrator and teacher.

== Playing career ==
=== First Division ===
At age 18, the determined Canónico approached a talent scout of the Liga Nacional de Béisbol, which had stabilized the first national championship of first division in Venezuela since its inauguration in 1930. Canónico then received an invitation to a tryout in 1934 and was offered a contract to play with the Senadores BBC, where he pitched and played some outfield. By then the league had established itself as an integral part of Venezuelan popular culture through the baseball, as it had a good blend of local and foreign players that included future Venezuelan big leaguers as Alex Carrasquel and Chucho Ramos, as well as several Negro league stars such as Leon Day, Josh Gibson, Monte Irvin, Bertrum Hunter and Leroy Matlock, among other players. This was an opportunity for the young Canónico to prove himself. If he could do this, he knew he would be capable of much more if he was given the opportunity.

In his rookie year, Canónico posted a 3–3 record with a 1.56 earned run average in 52 innings pitched. He then played briefly for the Gavilanes de Maracaibo in 1935 and returned to the Senadores the next year, playing exclusively as an outfielder/infielder, committing only one error in 55 chances at second base, good enough for a .982 fielding percentage. After that, he focused entirely on pitching. Canónico was aware that his first step should be to set priorities. He then intimidated the batters, even without being a power pitcher. Besides his curve, he developed an unpredictable sinkerball that moved away from hitters, while his average fastball and changeup were secondary pitches. Nevertheless, he was unable to pitch regularly due to arm issues.

In 1937 Canónico moved to the Patriotas de Venezuela, playing for them four years before joining the Vargas (1941), Magallanes (1942–43) Victoria (1943–44) and Los Sapos (1945) clubs. His most productive season came in 1945, when he amassed a mark of 11–1. Overall, he posted a 40–18 record with a 2.62 earned run average (ERA) during his seven seasons in the league.

=== 1941 Amateur World Series ===
By 1941, Canónico joined the Venezuelan pre-selection baseball team, then was added to the National Team roster for the Fourth Amateur World Series to be played in the month of October. The AWSB featured a nine-team tournament, which was held at La Tropical Stadium in the city of Havana. This was the fourth edition of the tournament, which was won by the Cuban squad in 1939 and 1940. As a result, the local team became a huge favorite before the tournament started. The Venezuelan team prevailed in six of its seven games, with its only defeat coming to the Dominican Republic, and had to face the undefeated Cuban team in the last game of the schedule. Canónico, who had won three of the six victories of his team, was slated to pitch that game and ended up throwing a five-hit, 4–1 victory against Cuba, a disappointing final for more than 30,000 people gathered at La Tropical. With both clubs tied at 7–1 after more than two weeks of play, the visitors to settle proudly for the result. Nevertheless, the overconfident Cubans insisted on an extra playoff game in order to decide an only winner and even allowed a three-day break, which permitted Canónico to rest his arm for one final showdown encounter. Significantly, Canónico had claimed all four of his starts in the preliminary round and posted a very solid 1.69 ERA across 32 innings of work. As a result, the decisive game was played on October 22, 1941, and Canónico won a pitching duel against legendary star Conrado Marrero as Venezuela beat Cuba, 3–1, which originated great consequences for baseball pride in both countries. Shortly after the victory, the then Venezuelan President Isaías Medina Angarita issued an official decree instituting October 22 as National Sports Day in the country. For the fifth Amateur World Series, the Cuban national team was selected by a fan poll, and Marrero was the top vote-getter. The series featured a rematch between Marrero and Venezuela's Canónico. This time the Cubans won 8–0, and the Cuban team regained the Cup.

=== Professional career ===
Furthermore, Canónico was one of the founding members of the Venezuelan Professional Baseball League in 1946, playing the dual role of pitcher and manager for the Sabios de Vargas club that won the championship title in the league's inaugural season. Canónico formed a battery with catcher Roy Campanella, who also managed some Vargas games on an interim basis early in the season. But soon thereafter his arm problems re-emerged and Canónico never regained his form. Consequently, when he was able to pitch was ineffective and suffered from bouts of wildness and elbow tendinitis.

Canónico later pitched for the Cervecería Caracas, Patriotas de Venezuela and Leones del Caracas, for whom he worked as a reliever and spot starter before retiring in 1953. Overall, he gathered a record of 4–9 with a 3.76 ERA in 60 pitching appearances, including 20 starts and seven complete games in 218 innings.

In between, Canónico pitched for Cervecería in the Game 8 of the 1949 Caribbean Series and was credited with a loss to the Almendares Cuban team.

== Later life and death ==
Canónico managed the Venezuelan national team at the 1952 Amateur World Series in Havana. He later managed the Indios de Oriente in the 1957-58 and 1961-62 VPBL seasons.

After retiring, Canónico moved to Barquisimeto, the capital city of Lara state. In his new environment, he worked as an instructor and manager of several amateur baseball teams, including the state's representing team that won three national consecutive titles from 1955 through 1957. His merits began to be recognized widely when he gained induction into the Venezuela Sports Hall of Fame in 1971.

Canónico had four children from his marriage with Marta Dort. He died in Barquisimeto in 1975 at the age of 59.

== Honors and awards ==
For many years Canónico has remained a considerably homegrown icon, even becoming the subject of celebratory songs, while a Caracas sports center was named in his honor in 2013 after his once-in-a-lifetime achievement. In addition, the former Olympic Stadium of Barquisimeto was renamed Estadio Daniel 'Chino' Canónico.

Way back in 1999, the VSL Chino Canónico baseball club was named after him and became a member of the Venezuelan Summer League, serving as a rookie-level circuit for the Atlanta Braves, Cleveland Indians, St. Louis Cardinals and Toronto Blue Jays of Major League Baseball from 1999 to 2000. Based in Barquisimeto, the VSL Chino Canónico won the league's title in its first season and finished in second place the next year.

31 years after his death, Canónico, along with his former teammates of the 1941 Baseball World Champion team, received recognition when the Venezuelan Baseball Hall of Fame and Museum inducted the entire team in its 2006 class.
