= Pedro Nelson =

Venezuelan baseball player (1921–1956)

- Pitcher
- Born: 1921; Caracas, Venezuela
- Died: July 30, 1956 (aged 34–35); Caracas, Venezuela

Member of the Venezuelan

Baseball Hall of Fame
- Induction: 2006 (as part of 1941 AWS team)
Medals
Representing Venezuela
Men's baseball
Baseball World Cup
Gold medal – first place	1941 Havana	Team

Pedro Nelson (1921 – June 30, 1956) was a Venezuelan professional baseball player and musician. Nelson was a member of the Venezuela national baseball team that won the 1941 Amateur World Series, and later played in the early years of the Venezuelan Professional Baseball League (LVBP). He was nicknamed El Buzo ("The Diver").

Born in La Pastora, Caracas, Nelson played as a catcher, pitcher, and outfielder in Venezuela's First Division, with the Magallanes and Venezuela clubs. Nelson pitched with the Venezuelan national team at the 1940 Amateur World Series in Havana. He was included in the roster of the national team that won the 1941 Amateur World Series in Havana, though he was the sole player on the team to not see action in the tournament. After the establishment of the LVBP in 1946, he played four professional seasons: three with Venezuela (1946; 1947-48 and 1948–49) and one with Magallanes (1946–47).

Nalson preferred music to baseball. After his playing career ended in 1949, he joined Billo's Caracas Boys, the orchestra headed by Dominican bandleader Billo Frómeta, as a bongos player. He also sang as part of a trio with Manolo Monterrey and Rafa Galindo, and became known for his part in the song "La Burrita de Petare."

Nelson died of a heart attack in 1956. Despite the fact that he did not play in the 1941 tournament, Nelson was inducted with the rest of his teammates into the Venezuelan Baseball Hall of Fame and Museum. He was also memorialized, with his nickname "Buzo," in Andrés Eloy Blanco's poem "Romance del campeonato", chronicling the 1941 team.
