= Carlos Ascanio =

Venezuelan baseball player (1918–1998)

- First baseman
- Born: April 4, 1918; Santa Lucía, Venezuela
- Died: February 27, 1998 (aged 79); Caracas, Venezuela
- Batted: Left Threw: Left

Negro leagues debut
- 1946, for the New York Black Yankees

Last Negro leagues appearance
- 1946, for the New York Black Yankees

Negro leagues statistics
- Batting average: .161
- Home runs: 0
- Runs batted in: 5
- Stats at Baseball Reference

Teams
- New York Black Yankees (1946)

Member of the Venezuelan

Baseball Hall of Fame
- Induction: 2019
- Election method: Historical Committee

Carlos Ascanio Serrano (April 4, 1918 – February 27, 1998) was a Venezuelan baseball player for the New York Black Yankees of the Negro leagues. He played first base and was nicknamed "the Earthquake" (Spanish: Terremoto) due to his powerful swing. Ascanio was the only Venezuelan to play in the Negro leagues.

== Career ==
Ascanio debuted with the "Luciteño" club before signing with Cerveceria Caracas, a first-division club; from there, he was signed by manager Joseíto Rodríguez to play in the Cuban Winter League with Cienfuegos. In Cuba, he was recruited by pitcher Dan Bankhead to join the Black Yankees. He appeared in 18 games with the club, slashing .161/.235/.161.

After his career in the Negro leagues, he returned to Venezuela. In the Venezuelan Professional Baseball League (LVBP), Ascanio played with Vargas (1946-1950, 1951–52), Caracas (1950-51), Venezuela (1950-51, 1952-53, 1954-55), Valencia (1957-59), and Pampero (1955-56, 1959-61); he also played in Venezuela's Western League with Centauros and Gavilanes. His best season was with Vargas in 1946, when he hit .378 and knocked in 14 runs. Over the course of his 15 winter league seasons, he posted a .275 batting average with 392 hits and 124 runs batted in.

After retiring in 1961, he spent a number of years running a sporting goods store in the Venezuelan capital city, Caracas. When petroleum prices began dropping rapidly in the 1980s, the former baseball player was forced to close his business.

On February 9, 1998, Ascanio was found "destitute and starving" on a sidewalk in downtown Caracas, where he had been living with his wife in a rundown boarding home. The two people that had found him immediately transported Ascanio to the nearest emergency room, where he was diagnosed with severe anemia caused by years of malnutrition. Just three weeks later, on February 27, Ascanio died due to complications from anemia and respiratory failure.
