= Antonio Briñez =

Antonio Briñez [bre'nyez] (September 17, 1917 – September 3, 1999) was a Venezuelan professional baseball player, coach and manager. He batted and threw left handed.

== Biography ==
Born in Maracaibo, Zulia, Briñez spent almost 30 years in Venezuelan baseball, playing in three different leagues while managing in two of them.

Basically a line-drive hitter and a fine defensive first baseman, Briñez also was a member of the Venezuela national team that won the gold medal in the 1944 Baseball World Cup, powering his team to upset victories over the strong Panama and Puerto Rico teams, while leading the tournament with seven hits.

Briñez made his professional debut in the First Division of Baseball of Venezuela, playing for five teams in nine seasons spanning 1936–1945. He then moved to the Cervecería Caracas club in 1946, to become a founding member of the Venezuelan Professional Baseball League in its inaugural season.

Briñez played for the Caracas club in five of his seven seasons in the league. In between, he also played with the Navegantes del Magallanes and the Sabios de Vargas before retiring in 1952. He returned to the VPBL during the 1960–1961 season to manage the Caracas franchise, after it was named the Leones del Caracas.

In a seven-season playing career, Briñez batted a .288 average and slugged .325 in 161 games. As a manager for Caracas, he replaced Tim Thompson in the midseason, but the timing could not be better for the last-place Leones, who finished with a 21-30 record and 10½ games out of contention. After that, he managed the Rapiños de Occidente of the Liga Occidental de Béisbol Profesional in 1963. Then, in 1966 he became the first manager who brought a National Amateur Baseball championship to his homeland.

Briñez died in 1999 in his natal city of Maracaibo, just 14 days short of his 82nd birthday.

== Greatest personal award ==
In 1944, Briñez was honored with the Athlete of the Year Award created by the Circle of Sports Journalists in Venezuela, becoming the first Venezuelan athlete to receive the award.

Since then, significant Venezuelan sportspeople have been awarded over the years, among others ballplayers Wilson Álvarez, Luis Aparicio, Tony Armas, Miguel Cabrera, Chico Carrasquel, Dave Concepción, Andrés Galarraga, Freddy García, Ozzie Guillén, Félix Hernández, Vidal López, Magglio Ordóñez, Luis Salazar, Johan Santana and Omar Vizquel.

The long honorees list of the CSJV also includes boxers Betulio González and Vicente Paúl Rondón; cyclist racers Daniela Larreal, José Rujano and Leonardo Sierra; motorcycle road racers Carlos Lavado and Johnny Cecotto, as well as basketballer Greivis Vásquez and free-diver Carlos Coste.
