= Rapiños de Occidente =

The Rapiños de Occidente (Western Raptors) was a Venezuelan baseball club that played from 1957 through 1963 in the Liga Occidental de Béisbol Profesional (Western Professional Baseball League). They played their home games at the old olympic stadium based in Maracaibo, Zulia.

== Team history ==
The Rapiños (rah-pee'nyoz) were the most successful team during the 10 years of existence of the league, while collecting a total of five titles during their six seasons in the circuit. The team entered the league in the 1957–1958 tournament as a replacement for the departed Gavilanes de Maracaibo.

Managed by Ira Hutchinson, the Rapiños won their first pennant in their league debut. Following an agreement between the Venezuelan Professional Baseball League and the LOBP, the interleague playoff games would be played immediately following the end of their respective 1957–1958 seasons. As a result, the winning team would represent Venezuela in the 1958 Caribbean Series. Then, the Rapiños were swept by the Industriales de Valencia, 4–0, in the best-of-seven series.

After that, the Rapiños won three consecutive pennants to set a record of four titles in a row in Venezuelan baseball history. In the same way, catcher/manager Les Moss posted a managing record with his three consecutive titles. Both records still remain intact.

The Rapiños failed again in the 1958–1959 playoffs series, losing to the Indios de Oriente in the maximum of seven games. A new opportunity arose when the 1959–1960 Venezuelan Professional Baseball League season was suspended due to a players' strike, and the Rapiños were invited to participate in the 1960 Caribbean Series. The team ended in last place with a 1-5 record, while their only victory came at expense of the Puerto Rico team.

The team clinched their fourth pennant in the 1960–1961 season, but the beginning of the end came when the 1961–1962 was cancelled. After that, the league resumed operations in 1962–1963, while the Rapiños claimed their fifth pennant, but the average attendance was less than half what it was in previous years.

Finally, the LOBP folded on December 3, 1963, due to economic pressure and internal conflicts, just one month later after starting the 1963–1964 season. The Rapiños faded with the league, standing in last place with a record of 6-13, when the four team circuit disbanded.

== Regular season team records ==
Season	W	L	PCT	Finish	Manager	Notes
1957–1958	30	13	.698	1st	Ira Hutchinson	Lost interleague play
1958–1959	28	25	.528	1st	Les Moss	Lost interleague play
1959–1960	18	13	.581	1st	Les Moss	League Championship; Played in the 1960 Caribbean Series
1960–1961	30	25	.545	1st	Les Moss	Won interleague play
1961–1962	–	–	–	–	–	Season cancelled
1962–1963	21	12	.636	1st	Les Moss	League Championship
1963–1964	6	13	.316	4th	Antonio Briñez	Shortened season
Totals	133	101	.568	–	–	Most pennant wins in the league

== Notable players ==
- Fritz Ackley 1962-63
- Teolindo Acosta (1959-60)
- Luis Aparicio (1957-58 – 1960-61; 1962-63 – 1963-64)
- Bob Aspromonte (1959-60)
- Ken Berry (1962-63)
- Ted Bowsfield (1959-60)
- Angel Bravo (1962-63)
- Don Buford (1962-63)
- Johnny Callison (1959-60)
- Cam Carreon (1958-59)
- Norm Cash (1958-59 – 1959-60)
- Glenn Cox (1958-59)
- Jerry Dahlke (1959-60) (1957-58)
- Dutch Dotterer (1960-61)
- Tom Flanigan (1957-58)
- Luis ″Camaleón″ García (1959-60)
- Pat Gillick (1962-63)
- Sam Hairston (1957-58)
- Ed Hobaugh (1959-60)
- Dave Hoskins (1957-58)
- Stan Johnson (1960-61)
- Deacon Jones (1962-63)
- Lewis Joyce (1962-63)
- Julián Ladera (1959-60)
- Barry Latman (1957-58)
- Jim McAnany (1958-59)
- J. C. Martin (1962-63)
- Joe Morgan (1960-61)
- Les Moss (1958-59 – 1960-61; 1962-63 – 1963-64)
- Billy Muffett (1958-59)
- Gary Peters (1960-61)
- Taylor Phillips (1962-63)
- Larry Raines (1960-61)
- Ed Rakow (1960-61)
- Mike Roarke (1960-61)
- Floyd Robinson (1960-61)
- Fred Talbot (1960-61)
- Bobby Winkles (1957-58)
- Corky Withrow (1962-63)

== See also ==
- Rapiños de Occidente players

== Sources ==
- Gutiérrez, Daniel; Alvarez, Efraim; Gutiérrez (h), Daniel (2006). La Enciclopedia del Béisbol en Venezuela. LVBP, Caracas. ISBN 980-6996-02-X
