= Yo-Yo Davalillo =

Venezuelan baseball player and manager

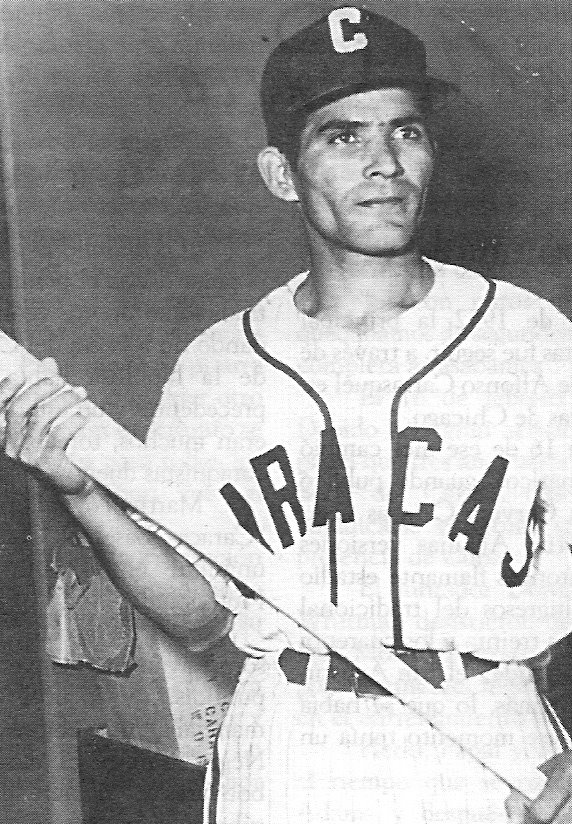
- Pompeyo Davalillo when he played with the Lions of Caracas
- Shortstop
- Born: June 5, 1928; Cabimas, Zulia, Venezuela
- Died: February 28, 2013 (aged 84); Ocumare del Tuy, Miranda, Venezuela
- Batted: Right Threw: Right

MLB debut
- August 1, 1953, for the Washington Senators

Last MLB appearance
- August 23, 1953, for the Washington Senators

MLB statistics
- Batting average: .293
- Home runs: 0
- Runs batted in: 2
- Stats at Baseball Reference

Teams
- Washington Senators (1953)

Career highlights and awards
- Leones del Caracas No. 1 retired; Águilas del Zulia No. 1 retired

Member of the Venezuelan

Baseball Hall of Fame
- Induction: 2007
Medals
Men's baseball
Representing Venezuela
Baseball World Cup
| Silver medal – second place | 1951 Mexico City | Team |
| Bronze medal – third place | 1950 Managua | Team |

Pompeyo Antonio Davalillo Romero [da-va-LEE-yo] (June 5, 1928 – February 28, 2013) was a Venezuelan professional baseball player and minor league manager. He played in Major League Baseball (MLB) as a shortstop for the Washington Senators; he also played and managed extensively in his native Venezuela. Standing at 5'3", he is one of the shortest players to ever see regular playing time in the major leagues.

== Career ==
Born in the oil town of Cabimas, Davalillo enlisted in the armed forces at 16, and eventually joined the armed forces amateur team. He was called up to play third base and leadoff for the Venezuelan national team that participated in the 1950 Amateur World Series in Nicaragua; he also represented the country at the 1951 and 1952 tournaments, as well as the 1951 Pan American Games in Argentina. He signed a professional contract with the Patriotas de Venezuela of the Venezuelan Professional Baseball League (LVBP), but almost immediately was traded to the Leones del Caracas. His rookie season, he posted a .267 batting average with 17 runs batted in and 10 stolen bases, good enough for rookie of the year honors.

Davalillo was drafted by the New York Yankees in 1953 and later transferred to the Washington Senators. At the age of 25, he made his major league debut with the Senators on August 1, 1953, becoming only the fourth Venezuelan to play in Major League Baseball after Alex Carrasquel (1939), Chucho Ramos (1944) and Chico Carrasquel (1950). (Note: Additionally, Carlos Ascanio played in the major Negro leagues, making Davalillo the fifth Venezuelan major leaguer overall.) On August 3, 1953, Davalillo and the Senators played the Chicago White Sox who fielded shortstop Chico Carrasquel, marking the first time in Major League history that two Venezuelan players faced each other on opposing teams. Davalillo had a promising future, but his aversion to airplane travel, combined with a severe injury, curtailed his career in the major leagues.

Davalillo played eleven seasons in minor league baseball, nine of them at Triple-A level, and posted a .270 average in 1,207 games. He also played in Mexico (1962–64) and spent fourteen seasons with the Leones del Caracas of the Venezuelan Winter League (1952–53 and 1965–66).

At 5'3", along with Stubby Magner he is the shortest person to have played a fielding position in Major League Baseball. He is the second-smallest player in major league baseball history. The shortest player on record is 43-inch Eddie Gaedel, who got one plate appearance (a walk) as a 1951 publicity stunt. Five players listed at 5'3" have played in the major leagues since 1900, according to Baseball Reference, with Pompeyo Davalillo, Jess Cortazzo, Bob Emmerich, Stubby Magner and Mike McCormack combining for 90 hits in 463 at-bats".

== Career statistics ==
In a 19-game major league career, Davalillo had 17 hits in 58 at bats for a .293 career batting average along with 2 runs batted in, 1 stolen base and scored 10 runs. He had a .305 on-base percentage along with a .935 fielding percentage. In 469 Venezuelan Winter League games, he was a .276 hitter with three home runs and 130 RBI, including 246 runs, 58 doubles, 19 triples and 67 stolen bases.

== Coaching career and honors ==
After his playing career had ended, Davalillo became a coach and a manager in the Venezuelan league. He won three championships as a manager in the LVBP: two with Águilas del Zulia (1991–92 and 1992–93) and one with Leones del Caracas (1994–95).

He also managed the Venezuela national baseball team on multiple occasions, including at the 1969 Amateur World Series in Santo Domingo and at the 1979 Pan American Games, held in San Juan, Puerto Rico.

Davalillo was inducted into the Venezuelan Baseball Hall of Fame and Museum in 2006. His younger brother Vic Davalillo, also played in Major League Baseball.

== See also ==
- List of players from Venezuela in Major League Baseball
