= Teolindo Acosta =

Venezuelan baseball player (1937–2004)

- Outfielder
- Born: July 23, 1937; Maracaibo, Zulia, Venezuela
- Died: August 2, 2004 (aged 67); Valencia, Carabobo, Venezuela
- Batted: Left Threw: Left

Teams
- Aguilas del Zulia (Venezuela baseball league); Cardenales de Lara (Venezuela baseball league); Industriales de Valencia (Venezuela baseball league); Leones de Yucatán (Mexico baseball league); Licoreros de Pampero (Venezuela baseball league); Llaneros de Acarigua (Venezuela baseball league); Pericos de Puebla (Mexico baseball league); Tecolotes de Nuevo Laredo (Mexico baseball league); Tigres de Aragua (Venezuela baseball league); Cardenales de Villahermosa (Mexico baseball league)

Career highlights and awards
- 2× Venezuelan league batting champion (1957–1958, 1965–1966); 3× Mexican league batting champion (1969, 1971, 1974); Two Caribbean Series appearances (1960, 1972)

Member of the Venezuelan

Baseball Hall of Fame
- Induction: 2006

Teolindo Antonio Acosta Lázaro (July 23, 1937 — August 2, 2004) was a Venezuelan professional baseball player. Listed at 5' 7", 168 lb., he batted and threw left handed.

Acosta was a distinguished batter in his homeland. As a result, many people called him, in friendly way, as El Loquito que Inventó el Hit (the tiny crazy who invented the hit).

His skills were shown in his motherland with the Aguilas del Zulia, Cardenales de Lara, Industriales de Valencia, Licoreros de Pampero, Llaneros de Acarigua and Tigres de Araguaof the Venezuelan Professional Baseball League. Besides, Acosta played nine seasons in the Mexican League for the Leones de Yucatán, Pericos de Puebla, Tecolotes de Nuevo Laredo and Cardenales de Villahermosa, now known as Olmecas de Tabasco .

Along his prolific career of 23 years, Acosta won five batting crowns, two of them in his motherland and the rest of them in México.

== Professional career ==
=== Early years ===
Acosta broke into minor league baseball with the Class-D Dothan Cardinals of the Alabama–Florida League in 1958, batting .313 with 76 RBI and a league-leading 36 stolen bases in 124 games. For whatever reason, the parent Cincinnati Reds assigned him to Dothan for a second season in 1959, and he responded by bopping out a .337 average and again led the circuit with 46 steals. Sufficiently impressed, the Reds moved Acosta up to the Billings Mustangs of the Class C Pioneer League the next season, where he topped the loop with a .369 average (the first of his five pro batting crowns) and 45 swipes. He leapfrogged over B ball in 1961 to play for Class A Columbia Reds of the South Atlantic League, and once more was best in the league in batting (.343) and steals (40), marking his fourth consecutive stolen base titles.

=== Venezuelan Winter League (1956–1979) ===
Teolindo Acosta belong to a selected list of baseball players in Venezuela, who are in the top of several offensive departments; Acosta is the third in the list of most games played (1130); third in plate appearances (4324); he is fourth in Run scored (604); also he is third in hits (1289); additionally, is in the second place in Triples (56) and fourth in stolen bases (121). Along his long career of twenty three years in the Venezuelan winter league, Acosta won two batting titles. In between, he spent part of the 1959–1960 season with the Gavilanes and Rapiños clubs of the rival Occidental League.

=== Mexico League (1968–1976) ===
Acosta was one of the top batters in Mexican baseball for nine seasons between 1968 and 1976, winning three batting titles in a six-year span. Never a power hitter, the 5' 6" 158-pound outfielder was a contact hitter who rarely struck out and sprayed the ball all over the field, similar in fashion to Rod Carew.

He cooled off a bit over the next few seasons, batting between .269 and 294 from 1962 through 1966, and after only hitting .238 for Buffalo of the International League over 49 games in 1967, he moved south to Mexico for the 1968 campaign with Puebla.

Acosta found his footing in the Mexican League, bettering .320 his first eight seasons. He hit .325 for the Pericos in 1968, followed by a Liga batting crown with a .354 average in 1969. Despite that, he moved on to Yucatán in 1970. After hitting .337 that season (including one game in which he went 6-for-6 with six runs), he was the top hitter in Mexico in 1971 with a career-high .392 BA and followed up with a solid .346 season in 1972. Acosta returned to Puebla during his .375 campaign in 1973, and won his fifth and final batting championship in 1974 with a .366 showing. After hitting .320 for Villahermosa in 1975, he wrapped up his career as a 39-year-old with Nuevo Laredo in 1976 by batting .276, his only sub-.300 season in nine Mexican League campaigns.

The left-handed Acosta carried a lifetime .328 average in 19 seasons of professional baseball, collecting 2,724 hits with 64 homers and 389 stolen bases. He did even better in Mexico, knocking out a .345 batting average (sixth-best lifetime in the Liga) with 132 stolen bases. He led all of professional baseball in batting in 1971 and 1974. Despite these figures, he is not a member of Mexican baseball's Salon de la Fama.

== Career statistics ==
Note: Some statistics are incomplete because there are no records available.
Bold denotes category leader.

=== Batting ===
Season	Team	League	GP	AB	R	H	2B	3B	HR	RBI	SB	BA	SLG	Ref
1956–1957	Licoreros de Pampero	LVBP	21	42	12	10	0	1	0	3	0	.238	.286	
1957–1958	Licoreros de Pampero	LVBP	38	148	35	57	4	2	1	11	3	**.385**	.459	
1958–1959	Licoreros de Pampero	LVBP	45	188	30	63	9	4	0	15	7	.335	.426	
1959–1960	Gavilanes de Maracaibo; Rapiños de Occidente	LOBP	18	71	12	19	4	0	1	11	3	.268	.352	
1959–1960	Industriales de Valencia	LVBP	29	106	16	31	2	1	0	10	5	.292	.330	
1960–1961	Industriales de Valencia	LVBP	46	172	27	47	1	0	0	11	8	.273	.279	
1961–1962	Industriales de Valencia	LVBP	49	198	30	65	5	1	2	18	5	.328	.394	
1962–1963	Industriales de Valencia	LVBP	39	169	32	54	7	6	0	12	8	.320	.432	
1963–1964	Industriales de Valencia	LVBP	45	174	24	48	4	4	0	20	13	.276	.345	
1964–1965	Industriales de Valencia	LVBP	48	195	29	63	7	1	0	11	6	.323	.369	
1965–1966	Industriales de Valencia	LVBP	55	221	34	77	8	1	0	14	8	**.348**	.394	
1966–1967	Industriales de Valencia	LVBP	59	229	29	66	6	2	0	15	5	.288	.332	
1967–1968	Industriales de Valencia	LVBP	46	182	26	51	6	2	0	3	4	.280	.335	
1968	Pericos de Puebla	LMB	99	354	53	115	16	6	4	39	15	.325	.438	
1968–1969	Llaneros de Acarigua	LVBP	59	230	27	73	7	2	0	14	13	.317	.365	
1969	Pericos de Puebla	LMB	142	534	87	189	29	9	6	82	18	**.354**	.476	
1969–1970	Aguilas del Zulia	LVBP	52	192	20	46	6	1	0	5	4	.240	.281	
1970	Leones de Yucatán	LMB	140	469	76	158	26	14	3	55	14	.337	.471	
1970–1971	Aguilas del Zulia	LVBP	21	68	8	21	2	1	0	2	0	.309	.368	
1970–1971	Tigres de Aragua	LVBP	35	139	22	49	7	5	1	19	4	.353	.496	
1971	Leones de Yucatán	LMB	133	441	75	173	22	11	7	71	17	**.392**	.540	
1971–1972	Tigres de Aragua	LVBP	60	242	31	68	6	4	0	17	5	.281	.339	
1972	Leones de Yucatán	LMB	134	492	77	170	25	11	4	51	11	.346	.465	
1972–1973	Tigres de Aragua	LVBP	60	251	37	74	7	5	0	14	6	.295	.363	
1973	Leones de Yucatán	LMB	121	419	64	157	17	8	9	66	11	.375	.518	
1973–1974	Tigres de Aragua	LVBP	59	225	40	82	6	6	1	27	0	.364	.458	
1974	Pericos de Puebla	LMB	122	464	93	170	17	6	2	43	20	**.366**	.442	
1974–1975	Tigres de Aragua	LVBPL	57	213	17	50	3	0	0	15	0	.235	.249	
1975	Villahermosa	LMB	109	416	43	133	9	8	0	30	19	.320	.380	
1975–1976	Tigres de Aragua	LVBP	59	231	24	65	5	4	0	15	3	.281	.338	
1976	Tecolotes de Nuevo Laredo	LMB	101	384	48	106	5	0	0	19	7	.276	.289	
1976–1977	Tigres de Aragua	LVBP	41	126	8	24	0	1	0	10	5	.190	.206	
1977–1978	Cardenales de Lara	LVBP	63	237	39	67	5	2	0	27	7	.283	.321	
1978–1979	Cardenales de Lara	LVBP	44	146	7	38	3	0	0	10	2	.260	.281	

=== The Sunset of Warrior ===
Acosta, basically was sharing his time as active baseball player between México and Venezuela, and after 23 seasons, he decided to hung up his spikes in 1979 while he was playing with Cardenales de Lara in the Venezuelan winter league. Acosta retired with a lifetime .298 average, and five batting crowns in his pocket, two batting titles he won in Venezuela and the rest of them in México.

After retiring from winter ball in 1979, Acosta settled down in Valencia where died from heart problems on August 2, 2004, at 67.

== Honors and Acknowledgments ==
In 2006 Acosta received the honor of induction into the Venezuelan Baseball Hall of Fame and Museum.

== Sources ==
- Treto Cisneros, Pedro (2002). The Mexican League/La Liga Mexicana: Comprehensive Player Statistics, 1937–2001. McFarland & Company. ISBN 978-0-78-641378-2
- Mexican Baseball Stars by John Phillips
- Nuñez, José Antero (1994). Serie del Caribe de la Habana a Puerto la Cruz. JAN Editor. ISBN 980-07-2389-7
- Gutiérrez, Daniel; Alvarez, Efraim; Gutiérrez (h), Daniel (1997). La Enciclopedia del Béisbol en Venezuela.
- Gutiérrez, Daniel; Alvarez, Efraim; Gutiérrez (h), Daniel (2006). La Enciclopedia del Béisbol en Venezuela. LVBP, Caracas. ISBN 980-6996-02-X
