= Ernesto Aparicio (baseball) =

Venezuelan baseball player

- Second baseman / Manager
- Born: March 11, 1910; Maracaibo, Zulia, Venezuela
- Died: March 2, 2006 (aged 95); Los Teques, Miranda, Venezuela

Member of the Venezuelan

Baseball Hall of Fame
- Induction: 2005

Ernesto Aparicio Ortega (11 March 1910 – 2 March 2006) was a Venezuelan professional baseball player, manager, and executive. Along with his younger brother, Luis Aparicio Ortega, he was the owner of the Gavilanes de Maracaibo, a team that played in Venezuela's Western League. His nephew, Luis Aparicio Montiel, played with Gavilanes before and during his Major League Baseball career, was admitted to the Baseball Hall of Fame in 1984.

Aparicio was a manager and instructor for both professional and amateur baseball. He played with several teams during the 1930s and early 1940s, while managing the National Team in international competition and leading Gavilanes BBC to nine championship titles in the Zulian Professional League, setting a record for the most titles won by a manager in Venezuelan baseball history.

== Playing career ==
Ernesto Aparicio was born in Maracaibo, Zulia. He and his brother Luis Aparicio began their athletic careers as association football (soccer) players with the Ayacucho club. They eventually transitioned to baseball, playing with local amateur teams in Zulia; Ernesto played second base while his brother Luis played as an outfielder. The two Aparicio brothers relocated to Caracas to play in the first division circuit in 1931, playing with the Lucana and Magallanes clubs. Eventually, they returned to Zulia to participate in the formation of the Gavilanes club.

With Gavilanes, the Aparicio brothers took place in the first Zulian baseball championship, which pitted their team against the crosstown Pastora club.

== Managerial career ==
Ernesto Aparicio led Gavilanes to its second championship in the Zulian amateur circuit in 1932, replacing manager Eduardo Luzardo. The next year, he steered the team in an exhibition series against Caracas club Royal Criollos. In 1937, he won another championship as manager of Gavilanes. In 1946, Ernesto Aparicio served as manager of the Zulia All-Star team that played against Jackie Robinson and other Negro league all stars in the Serie Monumental. In the 1947 season of the Venezuelan Professional Baseball League (LVBP), he managed Sabios de Vargas.

He was still managing Gavilanes when the Zulia-based league (like the Caracas-based LVBP) turned professional in 1946; he was one of the league's four original managers, alongside Miguel Solís (later replaced by Vidal López), Adolfo Luque, and Ramón Bragaña. Ernesto Aparicio acquired ownership of the Gavilanes club in 1947, when owner José Villasmil Gómez ceded him control of the team. In 1953, he recruited his nephew, future major leaguer Luis Aparicio (Montiel), from the Cardenales de Carora (then an amateur club), signing him to his first professional contract.

In 1957, a rift emerged between the two Aparicio brothers; Ernesto Aparicio sold the contract of the younger Luis Aparicio (Montiel) to the Leones del Caracas. As a result, the elder Luis Aparicio (Ortega) sued his brother Ernesto for ownership of Gavilanes; a court suspended Gavilanes from playing in the 1958–59 Western League season. However, the court eventually ruled in favor of Ernesto Aparicio, causing Luis Aparicio Ortega to form a competing team, Rapiños de Occidente. Though Gavilanes briefly returned to the Western League the following season, deepening financial issues would cause the club to fold for good in 1960.

== Death and legacy ==
Aparicio founded a youth baseball academy in which he trained dozens of teenage boys, including his nephew Luis Aparicio Montiel and future major league manager Ozzie Guillén. In 2005, he was inducted into the Venezuelan Baseball Hall of Fame and Museum as part of their second class, along with his brother Luis Aparicio Ortega.

Aparicio died in 2006 in the city of Los Teques, Miranda, nine days short of his 96th birthday.
