= Roberto Olivo =

Venezuelan baseball umpire

- Umpire
- Born: January 13, 1914; Caracas, Venezuela
- Died: June 22, 2005 (aged 91); Caracas, Venezuela

LVBP debut
- 1946

Last LVBP appearance
- 1968

Member of the Venezuelan

Baseball Hall of Fame
- Induction: 2003

Roberto Olivo (January 13, 1914 – June 22, 2005) was an international baseball umpire. He was born in Caracas, Venezuela.

Olivo is regarded as one of the best umpires in Venezuelan baseball history. In a career that spanned 29 years, his fame spread among his colleagues in the Caribbean, Mexico and the United States, both for his proper personality and extensive knowledge of the game and its rules, earning the respect of players, managers, fans and baseball writers. A member of two Halls of Fame, he also umpired in two Baseball World Cups and several Caribbean Series.

Olivo was inclined towards outdoor activities and sports since he was 16. At school level he participated in basketball, track and field, swimming and volleyball. After graduating, he briefly attempted to play semipro baseball, but turned to umpiring when he was asked to fill in for an umpire that did not show up to a game.

In those days, only two umpires covered typical regular games, and a player with a reputation for honesty might be pressed into service if one umpire became incapacitated. Olivo was asked to fill in one game and took to it well, being encouraged by a teammate to attend a professional umpire training school. He successfully made it through the school and worked his way to the Venezuelan Baseball First Division for the 1940 campaign. He then became a founding member of the Venezuelan Professional Baseball League, when the circuit joined organized baseball in 1946.

Olivo was nicknamed Tarzan for his impressive physique (He was about 6' 2", 220 pounds). It was an alias that he adopted and proudly used while umpiring in the Venezuelan league until 1968. In the interim, he also worked in the 1944 and 1945 Baseball World Cup tournaments and 11 Caribbean Series. Usually, he ran umpiring clinics and guided young umpires.

In addition, Olivo was the home plate umpire in four VPBL memorable games:

- On January 20, 1946, when Alejandro Carrasquel of the Navegantes del Magallanes won a 17-inning, complete game pitching duel against Roy Welmaker and the Sabios de Vargas by a score of 3–2.
- On December 15, 1955, when Lenny Yochim of the Leones del Caracas hurled the first no-hitter game in the league's history, defeating Ramón Monzant and the Navegantes del Magallanes, 3–0.

Furthermore, he also called balls and strikes in decisive games that gave the championship title both Magallanes (1949–1950) as the Leones (1952–1953).

In 1988 Olivo gained induction into the Venezuela Sports Hall of Fame. In 2003, he was enshrined in the Venezuelan Baseball Hall of Fame and Museum as part of their first class.

Olivo died at the age of 91 in Caracas, due to natural causes, and was buried at the Cementerio del Este in Caracas.
