= Davalillo =

Davalillo is a Spanish surname. Notable people with the surname include:

- David Davalillo (born 2002), Venezuelan baseball player
- Gabriel Davalillo (born 2007), Venezuelan baseball player
- Vic Davalillo (1936–2023), Venezuelan baseball player
- Yo-Yo Davalillo (1931–2013), Venezuelan baseball player and manager
