= Centauros de Maracaibo =

Venezuelan baseball club

The Centauros de Maracaibo was a Venezuelan baseball club that played from 1956 through 1958 in the Liga Occidental de Béisbol Profesional (Western Professional Baseball League). The team was founded and owned by entrepreneur Luis Rodolfo Machado and managed by Bob Wellman, a former Major League outfielder and first baseman for the Washington Senators.

The Centauros (Centaurs) finished with a 28–29 record in the 1956–57 season, good for a third place in the four-team league. They were led on offense by Wellman, who hit a .313 batting average and topped the league with 13 home runs and 45 runs batted in. The pitching staff was headed by Harry Byrd, who posted an 11–7 record with a 2.36 ERA and 79 strikeouts in 156 1/3 innings of work.

The team compiled a 14–29 mark in 1957–58, finishing dead last, 16 games out of contention. Their most significant contribution came from Billy Queen, who led the league with 15 home runs and 33 RBI, while ending second with a .351 average behind champion bat Jim Frey (.370).

The Gavilanes BBC replaced Centauros in the 1958–59 season.

== Bibliography ==
- Gutiérrez, Daniel; Alvarez, Efraim; Gutiérrez (h), Daniel (2006). La Enciclopedia del Béisbol en Venezuela. LVBP, Caracas. ISBN 980-6996-02-X
