= Juan Antonio Yanes =

- Born: June 24, 1902; Caracas, Venezuela
- Died: August 8, 1987 (aged 85); Caracas, Venezuela
- Occupation: Venezuelan Professional Baseball League
- Years active: 1938–1969
- Awards: Venezuelan Baseball Hall of Fame and Museum (2003 Induction)

Juan Antonio Yanes (June 24, 1902 – August 8, 1987) was an executive in Venezuelan Professional Baseball League who owned the Patriotas de Venezuela franchise.

== Career ==
Born in Caracas, Yanes was dubbed ″Yanesito″ (a diminutive of his last name). For more than three decades, he was one of the leading promoters of Venezuelan baseball both in the amateur and professional fields. A colorful character and prominent businessman, he worked as an advisor during the creation of the first Venezuelan league associated with Organized Baseball, which was established in 1945.

Yanes was also active in the founding of the first Professional Baseball Umpire School in 1938. In addition, he helped to develop the Venezuelan Professional Baseball Players Association and was a member of various multi-cultural organizations.

Organized Venezuelan baseball started in 1927, when was created the National Baseball League, which featured teams from the cities of Caracas, La Guaira, Maracay and Valencia, that later participated in an annual National Series against teams from Barquisimeto and Maracaibo. The First Division tournament was first held in 1938 in place of the National Series. By then, Yanes came into the league with his Patriotas de Venezuela team, which won the first Championship in the revamped circuit. The Patriotas won the title again in 1941,.

In 1945, Yanes convinced some First Division teams owners of about the need to incorporate Venezuela in Organized Baseball. The deal was completed in December of that year with the creation of the Venezuelan Professional Baseball League. The league was formally registered as an institution in early January 1946, and in the same month organized its first tournament with the participation of the teams Cervecería Caracas, Navegantes del Magallanes, Sabios de Vargas, and Yanes' Patriotas de Venezuela.

Yanes was elected as the League's front officer administrator and stayed in front of his team until 1955. Unfortunately for him, profits from the club declined sharply after 1951 as attendance collapsed. Although moderately successful with his business ventures, he was not earning anything close to enough capital to cover the costs of his baseball team for many years, much less to accumulate substantial wealth, being forced to resign in the face of imminent bankruptcy proceedings.

Nevertheless, Yanes did not fail to cooperate with Venezuelan baseball as best he could do it. In fact, he facilitated the entry of the Licoreros de Pampero as a substitute franchise in 1955 and later played a significant role in the formation of the Aguilas del Zulia club, which joined the expanded Venezuelan Professional Baseball League in 1969, to give Zulia state its most successful baseball franchise since the 1950s, by winning five League championships and two Caribbean Series titles spanning 1984–2000.

Yanes lived his entire life in Caracas. After retiring, he enjoyed spending time at home with his family and eventually going to the city's ballpark, where he shared memories and countless anecdotes with close friends, broadcasters, journalists, and baseball people. He died in 1987 at the age of 85.

Sixteen years after his death, Yanes was inducted into the Venezuelan Baseball Hall of Fame and Museum in its inaugural class of 2003.
