= Liga Occidental de Béisbol Profesional =

The Liga Occidental de Béisbol Profesional (Western Professional Baseball League) was a baseball circuit that operated between 1954 and 1963 in Maracaibo, the capital city in the Venezuela state of Zulia. The league played their games at the old olympic stadium of Maracaibo.

The LOBP started to operate as a four-team league on December 7, 1954, and was managed by local entrepreneurs under the guidance of George Trautman, an American baseball executive, who also helped the league to join organized baseball to become a professional baseball circuit.

== Innovations ==
Throughout the years, the league modified the number of games in the schedule and adopted playoffs. A significant innovation came before the 1953–1954 season, when the Venezuelan Professional Baseball League and the LOBP agreed to have the clubs with the best records from each circuit meet in a National Championship Series called El Rotatorio (the rotational), organized by the VPBL, which was the first and only in the league's history.

By then, both leagues were short of teams to play the regular season. Accordingly, the Cervecería Caracas and Navegantes del Magallanes teams represented the VPBL, while the Gavilanes and Pastora clubs represented the LOBP. Then, the Pastora team won the VPBL championship and advanced to the 1954 Caribbean Series.

Following an agreement between the two leagues, the interleague playoff games would be played immediately following the 1957–1958 season. As a result, the winning team would represent Venezuela in the 1958 Caribbean Series. The Rapiños de Occidente won the LOBP pennant, while the Industriales de Valencia did the same in the VPBL. After that, the Industriales swept the Rapiños, 4–0, in the best-of-seven series.

In the next playoff series, the Indios de Oriente VPBL champion team defeated the Rapiños, 4–3, and advanced to the 1959 Caribbean Series. Then, the Rapiños returned in 1959–1960 and won the pennant. This time, the Venezuelan Professional Baseball League season was suspended due to a players' strike, and the Rapiños club was invited to participate in the 1960 Caribbean Series.

== Final years ==
During its 10 years of existence, the Zulia league confronted many crises, big and small, in that short period. For a time in the late 1950s, a lack of competitive balance seemed to pose the greatest threat to the league.

The beginning of the end came when the 1961–1962 season was cancelled. After that, the league resumed operations in 1962–1963, but the average attendance was less than half what it was in previous years.

Due to economic pressure, the LOBP folded on December 3, 1963, just one month after starting the 1963–1964 season.

Pastora was the only club that participated in all seasons of the league, winning two pennants, while the most successful team was the Rapiños, who collected a total of five titles during its six seasons in the circuit.

== List of teams ==
- Cardenales de Lara (1962-1963 – 1963-1964)
- Centauros de Maracaibo (1956-1957 – 1957-1958)
- Espadón BBC (1954-1955 – 1955-1956)
- Gavilanes BBC (1954-1955 – 1956-1957; 1958-1959 – 1959-1960)
- Maracaibo BBC (1960-1961)
- Lácteos de Pastora (1954-1955 – 1963-1964)
- Petroleros de Cabimas (1954-1955 – 1959-1960; 1962-1963)
- Rapiños de Occidente (1957-1958 – 1963-1964)

== Seasons and statistics ==
Champion teams in bold

=== 1954–1955 ===
Team Standings	W	L	PCT	GB	Managers
**Pastora**	20	13	.606	–	John Strezza
Cabimas	19	14	.576	1	Clay Bryant
Espadón	14	19	.424	6	Ralston Hunsley
Gavilanes	13	20	.394	7	Fermín Guerra

Batting and Pitching statistics
Batter	Team	Stat	Tot	Pitcher	Team	Stat	Tot
Jim Frey	PAS	Batting average	.370	Bud Podbielan	PAS	Wins	9
John Malangone	ESP	Home runs	7	Barney Schultz	GAV	Strikeouts	62
Eddie Moore	CAB	Runs batted in	27	Kenneth Hommel	PAS	Earned run average	0.90

=== 1955–1956 ===
Team Standings	W	L	PCT	GB	Managers
**Gavilanes**	33	21	.611	–	Ernesto Aparicio
Cabimas	32	22	.593	1	Clay Bryant
Pastora	28	26	.519	5	Joe Schultz
Espadón	15	39	.278	18	Ralston Hunsley

Batting and Pitching statistics
Batter	Team	Stat	Tot	Pitcher	Team	Stat	Tot
Joe Altobelli	GAV	Batting average	.378	Dave Hoskins; Corky Valentine	GAV; PAS	Wins	11
Don Demeter; Russell Rac	CAB; PAS	Home runs	17	Barney Schultz	GAV	Strikeouts	62
Russell Rac	PAS	Runs batted in	52	Eusebio Pérez	GAV	Earned run average	2.09

=== 1956–1957 ===
Note: Espadón did not return and was replaced by Centauros

Team Standings	W	L	PCT	GB	Managers
**Gavilanes**	31	26	.544	–	Donald Griffin
Pastora	29	28	.509	2	Frank Baldwin
Centauros	28	29	.491	3	Bob Wellman
Cabimas	26	31	.456	5	Bill Cronin

Batting and Pitching statistics
Batter	Team	Stat	Tot	Pitcher	Team	Stat	Tot
Guilford Dickens	GAV	Batting average	.344	Dave Hoskins	GAV	Wins	14
Bob Wellman	CEN	Home runs	13	Barney Schultz	GAV	Strikeouts	62
Bob Wellman	CEN	Runs batted in	45	Dave Hoskins	GAV	Earned run average	1.68

=== 1957–1958 ===
Note: Rapiños replaced Gavilanes

Team Standings	W	L	PCT	GB	Managers
**Rapiños**	30	13	.698	–	Ira Hutchinson
Pastora	21	21	.500	9½	Johnny Temple
Cabimas	19	23	.452	10½	Bill Cronin
Centauros	14	29	.326	16	Bob Wellman

Batting and Pitching statistics
Batter	Team	Stat	Tot	Pitcher	Team	Stat	Tot
Paul Smith	PAS	Batting average	.368	Robert Smith	PAS	Wins	9
Billy Queen	CEN	Home runs	15	Tom Flanigan	RAP	Strikeouts	104
Jim Greengrass	PAS	Runs batted in	35	Barry Latman	RAP	Earned run average	1.40

=== 1958–1959 ===
Note: Gavilanes returned as a replacement for Centauros

Team Standings	W	L	PCT	GB	Managers
**Rapiños**	28	25	.528	–	Les Moss
Pastora	27	26	.509	1	Duane Pillette
Gavilanes	26	26	.500	1½	Red Kress
Cabimas	21	30	.412	6	Pete Reiser

Batting and Pitching statistics
Batter	Team	Stat	Tot	Pitcher	Team	Stat	Tot
Sammy Miley	PAS	Batting average	..357	Dave Hoskins	RAP	Wins	12
Billy Queen	GAV	Home runs	11	Larry Sherry	CAB	Strikeouts	138
Billy Queen	GAV	Runs batted in	40	Dave Hoskins	RAP	Earned run average	2.27

=== 1959–1960 ===
Classified teams in bold

Regular season standings	W	L	PCT	GB	Managers
**Rapiños**	18	13	.581	–	Les Moss
**Gavilanes**	14	17	.452	4	Jim Fanning
**Pastora**	14	17	.452	4	Leslie Peden
Cabimas	13	18	.419	5	Bill Harris

Postseason
First round Best of twelve series	W	L	PCT	GB	Second round Best of seven series	W	L	PCT	GB
**Pastora**; **Rapiños**; Gavilanes	7; 7; 4	5; 5; 8	.583.583.333	– – 3	**Rapiños**; Pastora	4; 2	2; 4	.667.333	– 2

Batting and Pitching statistics
Batter	Team	Stat	Tot	Pitcher	Team	Stat	Tot
Al Grunwald	PAS	Batting average	.336	Ted Bowsfield	RAP	Wins	14
Norman Cash	RAP	Home runs	14	Ed Hobaugh	RAP	Strikeouts	135
Norman Cash	RAP	Runs batted in	38	Bill Harris	CAB	Earned run average	2.27

=== 1960–1961 ===
Notes:
Cabimas and Gavilanes did not return
The new Maracaibo club folded during the midseason

Team Standings	W	L	PCT	GB	Managers
**Rapiños**	30	25	.545	–	Les Moss
Pastora	26	30	.464	4½	Joe Schultz
Maracaibo	8	16	.333	n/a	Preston Gómez

Batting and Pitching statistics
Batter	Team	Stat	Tot	Pitcher	Team	Stat	Tot
Camilo Carreon	PAS	Batting average	.303	Don Rudolph	PAS	Wins	12
Harry Watts	PAS	Home runs	12	Ed Rakow	MCB; RAP	Strikeouts	185
Harry Watts	PAS	Runs batted in	37	Ed Rakow	MCB; RAP	Earned run average	1.29

=== 1961–1962 ===
- The season was cancelled

=== 1962–1963 ===
Note: Cardenales debuted while Cabimas returned
Classified teams in bold

Regular season standings	W	L	PCT	GB	Managers
**Rapiños**	21	12	.636	–	Les Moss
**Cardenales**	16	15	.516	4	Earl Weaver; Joe Schultz
**Pastora**	15	18	.484	6	Frank Lucchesi
Cabimas	12	18	.387	8	Johnny Werhas

Postseason
Best of 16 series	W	L	PCT	GB
**Rapiños**	12	4	.750	–
Cardenales	9	7	.563	3
Pastora	2	14	.125	10

Batting and Pitching statistics
Batter	Team	Stat	Tot	Pitcher	Team	Stat	Tot
Deacon Jones	RAP	Batting average	.420	Fritz Ackley	RAP	Wins	11
Deacon Jones	RAP	Home runs	15	Bill Phillips	RAP	Strikeouts	152
Deacon Jones	RAP	Runs batted in	49	Fritz Ackley	RAP	Earned run average	2.47

=== 1963–1964 ===
Shortened season standings	W	L	PCT	GB	Managers
Cardenales	14	3	.824	n/a	Rodolfo Fernández
Pastora	8	9	.471	n/a	Jimmy Brown
Cabimas	7	10	.411	n/a	Dalmiro Finol
Rapiños	6	13	.316	n/a	Antonio Briñez

Batting and Pitching statistics
Batter	Team	Stat	Tot	Pitcher	Team	Stat	Tot
Danny Morejón	CAR	Batting average	.391	Luis Tiant	CAR	Wins	6
Héctor Cárdenas; Bob Taylor	CAR; PAS	Home runs	3	Luis Tiant	CAR	Strikeouts	81
Danny Morejón	CAR	Runs batted in	18	Luis Tiant	CAR	Earned run average	0.67

== Sources ==
- Gutiérrez, Daniel; Alvarez, Efraim; Gutiérrez (h), Daniel (2006). La Enciclopedia del Béisbol en Venezuela. LVBP, Caracas. ISBN 980-6996-02-X
- Gutiérrez, Daniel; González, Javier (2006); Records de la Liga Venezolana de Béisbol Profesional. LVBP. ISBN 978-980-6996-01-4
- Nuñez, José Antero (1994). Serie del Caribe de la Habana a Puerto La Cruz. JAN Editor. ISBN 980-07-2389-7
