= Joe Altobelli =

American baseball player, coach, and broadcaster (1932–2021)

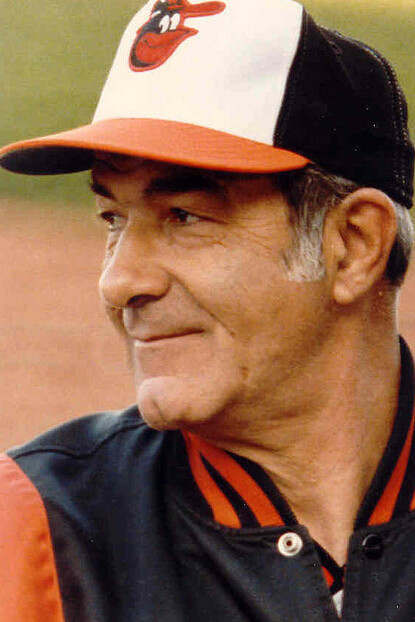
- Altobelli in 1983, the year he won a World Series
- First baseman / Manager
- Born: May 26, 1932; Detroit, Michigan, U.S.
- Died: March 3, 2021 (aged 88); Rochester, New York, U.S.
- Batted: Left Threw: Left

MLB debut
- April 14, 1955, for the Cleveland Indians

Last MLB appearance
- October 1, 1961, for the Minnesota Twins

MLB statistics
- Batting average: .210
- Home runs: 5
- Runs batted in: 28
- Managerial record: 437–407
- Winning %: .518
- Stats at Baseball Reference
- Managerial record at Baseball Reference

Teams
- As player: Cleveland Indians (1955, 1957); Minnesota Twins (1961); As manager: San Francisco Giants (1977–1979); Baltimore Orioles (1983–1985); Chicago Cubs (1991)

Career highlights and awards
- World Series champion (1983)

Joseph Salvatore Altobelli (May 26, 1932 – March 3, 2021) was an American professional baseball first baseman and outfielder who played for the Cleveland Indians and Minnesota Twins of Major League Baseball. He was also a manager for the San Francisco Giants, Baltimore Orioles, and Chicago Cubs. He batted and threw left-handed.

Altobelli succeeded Earl Weaver as manager of the Orioles in 1983 and led the team to their sixth American League pennant and their third (and most recent) World Series championship. He ended his involvement in professional baseball in 2009, retiring after over a decade as a color commentator for the Triple-A Rochester Red Wings.

== Early life ==
Altobelli was born in Detroit on May 26, 1932. He earned All-City recognition in baseball, football, and basketball while attending Eastern High School. He was signed as an amateur free agent by the Cleveland Indians before the 1951 season.

== Professional career ==
=== As player ===
Although Altobelli's playing career included three brief stints in the Major Leagues, his greatest success came in the minors. After being signed by the Indians, he was assigned to their Florida State League affiliate in Daytona Beach for the 1951 campaign. On April 26, Altobelli singled to begin a 36-game hitting streak which stood as the Florida State League record for 59 years until it was surpassed in 2010. In 140 games with the Islanders that season, he notched 204 hits while posting a .341 batting average.

He earned a promotion to the Eastern League the following year, posting two solid seasons with the Reading Indians, as he helped lead them to 101 wins and the Eastern League pennant in 1953. Another pennant followed in 1954, this time as a member of the AAA American Association's Indianapolis Indians. His .297 average and 79 RBI that season were enough to earn him a callup to the Majors the following year.

Altobelli made his big league debut in his hometown of Detroit on April 14, 1955, when he was inserted into the lineup in the eighth inning as a pinch runner for three-time All-Star Vic Wertz. His first hit and RBI came a week later when singled to left with the bases loaded to score Larry Doby. He played in 20 games with the Tribe before being returned to Indianapolis on May 9, where the Indians felt he could get more playing time as an everyday player. He was recalled to Cleveland in late June, and played in 13 games before being returned to AAA, where he hit .271 with 7 HRs and 53 RBI in 98 games that season with Indianapolis. With a September callup, Altobelli played in a total of 42 games for the big league club that season, hitting .200 BA, 2 HR, 5 RBI.

Joe remained with Indianapolis in 1956, as the club posted one of the most successful seasons in franchise history. The AAA Indians won the American Association pennant with a 92-62 record, including a 24-0 win over the Louisville Colonels on May 18. They swept the Denver Bears in the American Association finals, then swept the International League's Rochester Red Wings in the Junior World Series. In 145 games that year, Joe displayed a newfound power by slugging 19 home runs and ten triples while driving in 81 runs to go along with a .254 batting average.

Alto spent most of the 1957 season with the Cleveland Indians, playing in 83 games while filling a prime pinch hitter role and spotting Wertz at first base and Rocky Colavito in right field.

As a player, Altobelli was a slugging first baseman and outfielder who enjoyed his greatest success at the AAA level. He batted only .210 in 166 MLB games with the Cleveland Indians (1955, 1957) and Minnesota Twins (1961), with five home runs, and 28 runs batted in (RBI). However, Altobelli reached double-digits in home runs in nine of his thirteen seasons as a AAA player. As a member of the Montreal Royals, he led the 1960 International League (IL) in home runs (31) and RBI (105).

In between, Altobelli played baseball in three winter seasons in Venezuela: one year in the Liga Occidental de Béisbol Profesional (LOBP) and two in the Venezuelan Professional Baseball League (VPBL). He claimed a batting title with a .378 average for the 1955–56 Gavilanes de Maracaibo championship team; he then posted two solid campaigns with the Indios de Oriente (1956–57) and Industriales de Valencia (1960–61).

=== As coach and manager ===
In 1966, Altobelli began an 11-year apprenticeship as a manager in the Baltimore farm system, culminating in six seasons (1971–1976) managing the IL Rochester Red Wings. During his tenure, the Red Wings finished first four times. Altobelli's first major league managerial assignment began when the San Francisco Giants hired him to succeed Bill Rigney, on October 7, 1976. Although Altobelli's 1978 club finished 16 games above .500 and in third place in the National League West Division, he was dismissed in 1979, his third season, with a mark of 225–239 (.485) as Giants' manager.

Altobelli then joined the New York Yankees as manager of their AAA farm team, the Columbus Clippers. After another first-place IL finish in 1980, Altobelli became a Yankees coach, from 1981 to 1982, working under managers Gene Michael, Bob Lemon, and Clyde King.

Altobelli signed a two-year contract as manager of the Orioles on November 12, 1982, succeeding Earl Weaver who had retired one month prior. Jim Palmer said that Altobelli was "very compassionate and sensitive compared to most managers" unlike Weaver who "isn't all that compassionate and sensitive even compared to most chain gang wardens." The Altobelli-led team posted 98 wins, winning the American League East Division championship, then bested the Chicago White Sox, three games to one, in the American League Championship Series (ALCS). The Orioles then defeated the Philadelphia Phillies in the 1983 World Series, winning in five games.

The Orioles fell to fifth in the AL East in 1984, despite playing eight games over .500. After the Orioles began the 1985 season in first place with an 18–9 record, an 11–17 slump resulted in Altobelli's dismissal on June 13 and Weaver's return as manager which ended the latter's 2 1/2-year retirement. (Orioles' owner Edward Bennett Williams had never really respected Altobelli's intellect, referring to him as "cement head".)

Altobelli then returned to coaching, working with the Yankees again (1986–1987), serving next under Don Zimmer with the Chicago Cubs from 1988 to 1991, and filling in as interim manager for one game when Zimmer was fired in 1991, before being replaced in Chicago by Jim Essian.

=== Return to Rochester ===
Altobelli returned to Rochester in 1991 and took over as general manager of the Red Wings the following year, overseeing a staff that included Russ Brandon, Glenn Geffner, Joe Kehoskie, Josh Lewin, and Bob Socci. He served in this capacity for three years. Altobelli subsequently acted as special assistant to the club president until 1997. One year later, he began serving as the color commentator for Red Wings home-game broadcasts. He announced his retirement in early 2009, making it the first year he was out of organized baseball since 1950.

Altobelli was referred to as Rochester's "Mr. Baseball." His 26 was the first number retired by the team, he was an inaugural inductee into the Red Wings Hall of Fame, and in 2010 a statue of Altobelli was installed on the Frontier Field concourse, which included a plaque noting he is the only man to have been a player, coach, manager, and general manager of the team.

== Managerial record ==
Team	Year	Regular season					Postseason			
Team	Year	Games	Won	Lost	Win %	Finish	Won	Lost	Win %	Result
SF	1977	162	75	87	.463	4th in NL West	–	–	–	–
SF	1978	162	89	73	.549	3rd in NL West	–	–	–	–
SF	1979	140	61	79	.436	4th in NL West	–	–	–	–
SF total		464	225	239	.485		0	0	–	
BAL	1983	162	98	64	.605	1st in AL East	7	2	.778	Won World Series (PHI)
BAL	1984	162	85	77	.525	5th in AL East	–	–	–	–
BAL	1985	55	29	26	.527	fired	–	–	–	–
BAL total		379	212	167	.559		7	2	.778	
CHC	1991	1	0	1	.000	interim	–	–	–	–
CHC total		1	0	1	.000		0	0	–	
Total		844	437	407	–		7	2	.778	

== Personal life ==
Altobelli resided in Rochester, New York. He married Patsy Ruth Wooten in 1952. Together they had six children: Mike, Mark, Jody, Jackie, Jerry, and Joe. They remained married for 51 years until her death in 2003.

Altobelli suffered a stroke in November 2017, and consequently resided at a rehabilitation center. He made his final public appearance two years later in August 2019, when Rich Dauer – who played under Altobelli in 1976 – was inducted into the Rochester Red Wings Hall of Fame. Altobelli died on March 3, 2021, at the age of 88.
