= Pastora (baseball club) =

Baseball team in Venezuela

Information
- League: Zulia First Division (1932–53); Venezuelan Western League (1954–64); Venezuelan Professional Baseball League (1953–54, 1995–2007)
- Ballpark: Estadio Olímpico Alejandro Borges; Maracaibo, Venezuela
- Founded: 1932 (first incarnation)
- Folded: 2007 (last incarnation)
- Colors: Red, white

Pastora (lit. "Shepherds") is a name used by several now-defunct baseball clubs in Venezuela, based primarily in the northwestern city of Maracaibo, Zulia State.

The club originated in the Zulian First Division of amateur baseball, eventually adopting the name Lácteos de Pastora (English: Pastora Milkmen) due its sponsorship by a local dairy company. It later became a professional baseball club after the First Division transformed into the Liga Occidental de Béisbol Profesional (Western League). During this period, Pastora enjoyed a fierce rivalry with Gavilanes de Maracaibo, and represented Venezuela at the 1954 Caribbean Series. The club folded when the Western League ceased to exist in 1964.

In 1995, an expansion club by the name of Pastora de Occidente was formed, based in the city of Cabimas, Zulia. The team relocated to Acarigua in nearby Portuguesa State as Pastora de los Llanos in 1997, before eventually moving to Margarita Island as the Bravos de Margarita.

== Name ==
The Pastora team was based in the City of Maracaibo and was sponsored by a local dairy company, adopting the name Lácteos de Pastora. Although Zulia is a petroleum state, dairy farming is also a major industry there. After Maracaibo was founded in 1529, shepherds tended cows and goats for their milk and to make cheese and other dairy products. Pastora is the Spanish word for shepherd, and the patron saint of the neighboring state of Lara is La Divina Pastora (The Divine Shepherdess). Each January 14, her statue is typically carried on the main streets of Barquisimeto from the city of Santa Rosa, in the outskirts of Barquisimeto, until it reaches the Cathedral of Our Lady of Mount Carmel, Barquisimeto about five miles away. The devotion to the Divina Pastora in Venezuela dates from 1736, when the parish priest of the town of Santa Rosa commissioned a sculptor to make a statue of the Immaculate Conception. Unexpectedly, the figure that was delivered was of the Divina Pastora.

== History ==
Pastora debuted in the Zulian Baseball League First Division, which was created in 1932 and folded at the end of the 1940 season. After five years of absence, the league resumed operations in 1946 and remained active until 1952.

Pastora played in all these seasons, winning the 1934 and 1948 titles. The most successful team in this period was the Gavilanes BBC, which won 13 of the 17 tournaments played, eight with Ernesto Aparicio at the helm. In 1951, Orange Victoria won the league championship remaining.

After that, the circuit was renamed Liga Occidental de Béisbol Profesional before joining Organized Baseball in 1953, operating continuously until 1964.

In 1953, the Venezuelan Professional Baseball League and the recently created LOBP agreed to have the clubs with the best records from each circuit meet in a National Championship Series called El Rotatorio, the first and only in VPBL history. The Cervecería Caracas and Navegantes del Magallanes clubs represented the VPBL, while Gavilanes and Pastora represented the LOBP. The pennant was clinched by Pastora with a 48–30 record. Managed by veteran Napoleón Reyes, the champion team won easily over Magallanes (40–37), Gavilanes (34–44) and Caracas (33–44), earning the right to represent Venezuela in the 1954 Caribbean Series.

In the opening game of the 1954 Series, the Venezuelan squad defeated the Cuban team for the first time in Series history, 7–5, after suffering 10 consecutive loses in the past five tournaments. Nevertheless, Pastora went 1–4 to finish last in the four-team event. Among others, that Pastora roster included pitchers Ralph Beard, Tommy Byrne, Howie Fox and Ramón Monzant; catcher Ed Bailey; outfielders Wally Moon and Billy Queen; as well as infielders Camaleón García, Vernon Benson, Johnny Temple and the then-rookie Luis Aparicio, who made his first Series appearance.

Pastora returned to the Zulia circuit for the 1954–55 season, to win the first title in this stage of the league. Both leagues used a new playoffs format in the 1957–58, 1958–59 and 1960–61 seasons to determine the national team to represent Venezuela in the Caribbean Series, but, after their championship season in 1954–55, the Pastora club was out of contention until 1963–64, during what turned out to be the LOBP's final season.

=== LVBP ===
More than four decades later, a new Pastora club joined the Venezuelan Professional Baseball League as a replacement for the Petroleros de Cabimas. Renamed Pastora de Occidente, the team was based in the city of Cabimas. Managed by Domingo Carrasquel, they finished 30-31 in 1995-96, getting knocked out by the Zulia Eagles in a tie-break game for playoff and 18-34 in 1996-97 without any chance of advancing to the playoffs in both seasons. Its only highlight came when on 21 November 1996, Doug Creek, Jose Villa and Luis Lunar pitched a combinated no-hitter against Caribes, before withdrawing at the end of that season due to poor attendance and results.

Pastora moved to the cities of Acarigua and Araure in Portuguesa. The teams changed its name to the Pastora de los Llanos and continued to operate in the VPBL between the 1997–98 and 2006-2007 seasons. Unlike the teams it replaced, Pastora advanced to playoffs but never made it into finals. The closest they were was in the 1999-2000 season after the Navegantes del Magallanes knocked them out in a tie-break game. Despite the initial success, the team performed poorly in the next seasons, even having a worst record of 12-37 for the cancelled 2002-03 season; had been the season not cancelled, the elimination of the team was seemed inevitable. Following six seasons and four classifications to playoffs plagued of failures, subsequent profit losses, lack of support and poor attendance to the stadium, the owner sold the team at the end of 2007.

Starting the 2007-08 season, the franchise moved to Margarita Island and was renamed Bravos de Margarita. Since then, no other team named Pastora has participated in Venezuelan professional baseball.

== Players with MLB experience ==
- Alex Cabrera
- Dan Carlson
- Doug Creek
- Eddy Díaz
- Gus Gandarillas
- Alberto González
- Ramón Hernández
- Dax Jones
- Rob Lukachyk
- Robert Machado
- Carlos Maldonado
- Mike Misuraca
- Carlos Monasterios
- Luis Ordaz
- Steve Pegues
- Tomás Pérez
- Roberto Petagine
- Scott Pose
- Sid Roberson
- Olmedo Sáenz
- Yorvit Torrealba
- Joe Thurston
- Carlos Valderrama
- Keith Williams
- Desi Wilson
- Trevor Wilson

== See also ==
- Lácteos de Pastora players
- Pastora de los Llanos players
- Pastora de Occidente players
- History of baseball in Venezuela
