= Estadio Luis Aparicio El Grande =

Stadium in Maracaibo, Venezuela

Coordinates: 10.672944°N 71.648125°W

Estadio Luis Aparicio "El Grande"
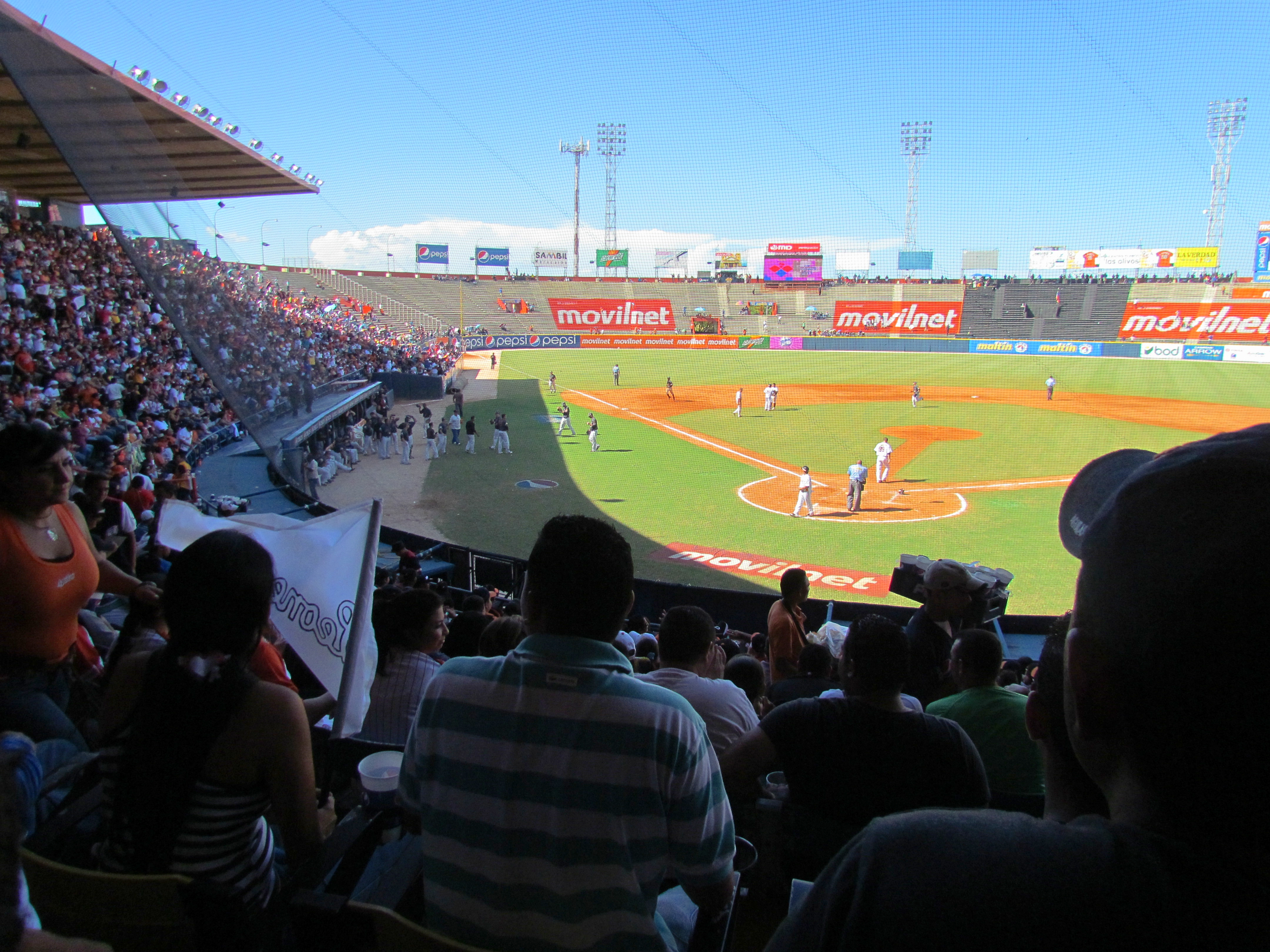
- Interactive map of Estadio Luis Aparicio "El Grande"
- Location: Maracaibo, Venezuela
- Capacity: 23,900

Construction
- Opened: 16 August 1963

Tenant
- Águilas del Zulia

Estadio Luis Aparicio El Grande is a multi-use stadium in Maracaibo, Venezuela. It is currently used mostly for baseball games and serves as the home of Águilas del Zulia. The stadium holds 23,900 people and opened in 1963. It also hosted the 1986 Caribbean Series. It is named after longtime Maracaibo shortstop Luis Aparicio, Sr., the father of Luis Aparicio.

Gloria Estefan performed at the stadium on 7 March 1992 during her Into The Light World Tour.

The American boy band Backstreet Boys performed at the stadium on 9 May 2001 during Black & Blue Tour.
