= Venezuelan Baseball Hall of Fame and Museum =

Baseball hall of fame

The Salón de la Fama y Museo del Béisbol Venezolano (in English, the Venezuelan Baseball Hall of Fame and Museum) is a nonprofit institution operated by private interests, which was founded on April 18, 2002, thanks to the vision of Carlos Daniel Cárdenas Lares. The institution is located at Centro Sambil, in Valencia, the capital city of Carabobo State and the third largest city of Venezuela.

The museum offers visitors the origins and growth of baseball in the world and the history of what is known as the National sport of Venezuela. It also shows, through its exhibitions, the most prominent players who have made significant achievements, as well as efforts to honor people who have highlighted the activity of baseball in Venezuela, recognizing and appreciating their impact on national culture and exalt those who have made outstanding contributions to the sport.

The museum covers a total area of 2,300 square meters and is laid out on two levels. The first floor of the museum includes four historical rooms, an auditorium dedicated to Luis Aparicio, an art gallery named after Andrés Galarraga, a baseball library and a shop. On the second floor are a permanent Hall of Fame exhibition, two batting cages, and a newsroom.

Since its opening in 2002, the museum created two nominating committees responsible for selecting the most notable baseball figures of all time. The Contemporary Committee, comprising representatives of the media, official scorekeepers, umpires, representatives of the Venezuelan Professional Baseball League, and Players Association officers, have the task of choosing both natives and foreign players who developed their careers in Venezuelan professional baseball through the 1980–2012 period. Meanwhile, the Historical Committee selects those players who made their careers in the period prior to the 1980–1981 season of the VPBL. In both cases, are also recognized those managers, executives, broadcasters and individuals who have collaborated in the development of baseball in Venezuela.

== Members ==
Notes

Bold denotes major league player (Note: On December 16, 2020, Major League Baseball declared six of the Negro leagues, from the span of 1920–1948, to be official "major leagues" on par with MLB.)
Italics denotes National Baseball Hall of Fame and Museum member
Elected by Contemporary Committee ^{†}
Elected by Historical Committee ^{‡}
Elected by Special Committee ^{↔}
In 2004 there was no selection

=== 2003 ===
Name	Date of birth	Place of birth	Date of death	Primary team	Position	Refs
**Luis Aparicio**	Apr 29, 1934	(Venezuela) Maracaibo		Chicago White Sox	Player/Manager	^{‡}
José Bracho	Jul 23, 1928	(Venezuela) Maracaibo	Jun 16, 2011	Leones del Caracas	Player	^{‡}
**Alejandro Carrasquel**	Jun 24, 1920	(Venezuela) Caracas	Aug 19, 1969	–	Player	^{‡}
**Alfonso Carrasquel**	Jan 23, 1928	(Venezuela) Caracas	May 25, 2005	Cleveland Indians	Player/Manager	^{‡}
José Antonio Casanova	Feb 18, 1918	(Venezuela) Maracaibo	Jul 8, 1999	Cerveceria Caracas	Player/Manager	^{‡}
**David Concepción**	Jun 17, 1948	(Venezuela) Ocumare Cst		Cincinnati Reds	Player	^{‡}
**Víctor Davalillo**	Jul 31, 1939	(Venezuela) Cabimas	Dec 6, 2023	Cleveland Indians	Player	^{‡}
Luis García	Sep 14, 1929	(Venezuela) Carúpano	Jan 9, 2014	Navegantes del Magallanes	Player	^{‡}
Vidal López	Apr 19, 1918	(Venezuela) Río Chico	Feb 20, 1972	Navegantes del Magallanes	Player/Manager	^{‡}
Roberto Olivo	Jan 13, 1914	(Venezuela) Caracas	Jun 22, 2005	–	Umpire	^{‡}
**Diego Seguí**	Aug 17, 1937	(Cuba) Holguín		Leones del Caracas	Player	^{‡}
Abelardo Raidi	Dec 25, 1914	(Venezuela) Valencia	Jan 27, 2002	–	Executive	^{‡}
Juan Antonio Yanes	Jun 24, 1902	(Venezuela) Caracas	Aug 8, 1987	Patriotas de Venezuela	Owner/Pioneer	^{‡}
**César Tovar**	Jul 30, 1940	(Venezuela) Caracas	Jul 14, 1994	Minnesota Twins	Player	^{‡}

=== 2005 ===
Name	Date of birth	Place of birth	Date of death	Primary team	Position	Refs
Ernesto Aparicio	Mar 11, 1910	(Venezuela) Maracaibo	Mar 2, 2006	Gavilanes de Maracaibo	Player/Manager	^{‡}
Luis Aparicio, Sr.	Aug 28, 1912	(Venezuela) Maracaibo	Jan 1, 1971	Gavilanes de Maracaibo	Player/Manager	^{‡}
**Tony Armas**	Jul 2, 1953	(Venezuela) Puerto Píritu		Boston Red Sox	Player	^{†}
José Del Vecchio	May 3, 1917	(Venezuela) Miranda	May 27, 1990	–	Promoter	^{‡}
Herman Ettedgui	Jul 31 1917	(Venezuela) Puerto Cabello	Jun 17, 2012	–	Journalist	^{‡}

=== 2006 ===
Name	Date of birth	Place of birth	Date of death	Primary team	Position	Refs
Teolindo Acosta	Jul 23, 1937	(Venezuela) Maracaibo	Aug 2, 2004	Industriales de Valencia	Player	^{‡}
Pancho Pepe Cróquer	May 23, 1920	(Venezuela) Turmero	Dec 18, 1955	–	Broadcaster	^{‡}
Emilio Cueche	Oct 20, 1927	(Venezuela) Barcelona	Jul 31, 2006	Industriales de Valencia	Player	^{‡}
**Baudilio Díaz**	Mar 23, 1953	(Venezuela) Cúa	Nov 23, 1990	Philadelphia Phillies	Player	^{†}
**Ramón Monzant**	Jan 4, 1933	(Venezuela) Maracaibo	Aug 10, 2001	Navegantes del Magallanes	Player	^{‡}
1941 Amateur World Series champion team						^{‡}

=== 2007 ===
Name	Date of birth	Place of birth	Date of death	Primary team	Position	Refs
**Pompeyo Davalillo**	Jul 5, 1928	(Venezuela) Cabimas	Feb 28, 2013	Leones del Caracas	Player/Manager	^{‡}
**Cocaína García**	Dec 28, 1905	(Cuba) Manacas	Apr 13, 1995	Deportivo Caracas	Player	^{‡}
Delio Amado León	Sep 13, 1932	(Venezuela) Maracay	Nov 30, 1996	Leones del Caracas	Broadcaster	^{‡}
**Jesús Marcano Trillo**	Dec 25, 1950	(Venezuela) Caripito		Philadelphia Phillies	Player	^{†}

=== 2008 ===
Name	Date of birth	Place of birth	Date of death	Primary team	Position	Refs
Gualberto Acosta	Jul 12, 1924	(Venezuela) Caracas	Jun 11, 2008	–	Umpire	^{‡}
Héctor Benítez	Nov 1, 1918	(Venezuela) Caracas	Jun 17, 2011	Venezuela	Player	^{‡}
**Gustavo Gil**	Apr 19, 1939	(Venezuela) Caracas	Dec 8, 2015	Navegantes del Magallanes	Player	^{‡}
**Luis Leal**	Mar 21, 1957	(Venezuela) Cardenales de Lara			Player	^{†}
**Gonzalo Márquez**	Mar 31, 1946	(Venezuela) Carúpano	Dec 20, 1984	Leones del Caracas	Player	^{†}
Luis Peñalver	Nov 20, 1941	(Venezuela) Cumaná		Leones del Caracas	Player	^{†}
Oscar Prieto Ortiz	Ago 1, 1905	(Venezuela) Ciudad Bolívar	Aug 10, 1983	Leones del Caracas	Owner	^{‡}

=== 2009 ===
Name	Date of birth	Place of birth	Date of death	Primary team	Position	Refs
**Urbano Lugo**	Aug 12, 1962	(Venezuela) Punto Fijo		Leones del Caracas	Player	^{†}
**Aurelio Monteagudo**	Nov 19, 1943	(Cuba) Caibarién	Nov 19, 1990	Tiburones de La Guaira	Pitcher	^{†}
Oswaldo Olivares	Sep 15, 1953	(Venezuela) Caracas		Navegantes del Magallanes	Player	^{†}
**Regino Otero**	Sep 7, 1915	(Cuba) Havana	Oct 21, 1988	Industriales de Valencia	Manager	^{‡}
**Chucho Ramos**	Apr 12, 1918	(Venezuela) Maturín	Sep 2, 1977	Navegantes del Magallanes	Player	^{‡}
**Luis Tiant**	Nov 23, 1940	(Cuba) Marianao	Oct 8, 2024	Tiburones de La Guaira	Player	^{†}
Carlos Tovar Bracho	Feb 5, 1933	(Venezuela) Valencia	Mar 6, 2006	–	Broadcaster	^{‡}
Luis Zuloaga	Dec 31, 1922	(Venezuela) Valencia	May 22, 2013	Cerveceria Caracas	Player	^{‡}

=== 2010 ===
Name	Date of birth	Place of birth	Date of death	Primary team	Position	Refs
**Luis Aponte**	Jun 14, 1951	(Venezuela) El Tigre		Cardenales de Lara	Player	^{†}
**Ángel Bravo**	Aug 4, 1942	(Venezuela) Santa Rita		Cardenales de Lara	Player	^{‡}
**Andrés Galarraga**	Jun 18, 1961	(Venezuela) Caracas		Leones del Caracas	First baseman	^{†}
Teodoro Obregón	Dic 17, 1935	(Venezuela) Caracas		Industriales de Valencia	Player	^{‡}
Pedro Padrón Panza	Sep 16, 1920	(Venezuela) La Guaira	Apr 1, 1999	Tiburones de La Guaira	Owner	^{‡}
Lázaro Salazar	Feb 4, 1912	(Cuba) Havana	Apr 25, 1957	Navegantes del Magallanes	Player/Manager	^{‡}

=== 2011 ===
Name	Date of birth	Place of birth	Date of death	Primary team	Position	Refs
**Wilson Álvarez**	Mar 24, 1970	(Venezuela) Maracaibo		Águilas del Zulia	Player	^{†}
**Oswaldo Guillén**	Jan 20, 1964	(Venezuela) Ocumare del Tuy		Tiburones de La Guaira	Player	^{†}
**Roberto Muñoz**	Nov 21, 1949	(Venezuela) Caracas	Sep 23, 2012	Industriales de Valencia	Player	^{‡}
**Luis Salazar**	May 19, 1956	(Venezuela) Barcelona		Tiburones de La Guaira	Player	^{†}

=== 2012 ===
Name	Date of birth	Place of birth	Date of death	Primary team	Position	Refs
Dalmiro Finol	Aug 21, 1919	(Venezuela) Maracaibo	May 16, 1994	Cerveceria Caracas	Player	^{‡}
**Luis Sojo**	Jan 3, 1965	(Venezuela) Caracas		Cardenales de Lara	Player/Manager	^{†}

=== 2014 ===
Name	Date of birth	Place of birth	Date of death	Primary team	Position	Refs
**Dámaso Blanco**	Dec 11, 1941	(Venezuela) Curiepe		Navegantes del Magallanes	Player/Sportscaster	^{‡}
Juan Vené	Jan 10, 1929	(Venezuela) Caracas	Sep 15, 2016	–	Journalist/Sportscaster	^{‡}

=== 2015 ===
Name	Date of birth	Place of birth	Date of death	Primary team	Position	Refs
**Oswaldo Blanco**	Sep 8, 1945	(Venezuela) Maracaibo		Tiburones de La Guaira	Player	^{↔}
Leonel Carrión	Feb 15, 1952	(Venezuela) Maracaibo		Águilas del Zulia	Player	^{↔}
**Remigio Hermoso**	Oct 1, 1947	(Venezuela) Puerto Cabello	Aug 21, 2020	Tiburones de La Guaira	Player	^{↔}
Julián Ladera	Jul 15, 1928	(Venezuela) Carmen de Uria	Sep 14, 1973	Industriales de Valencia	Player	^{↔}
Balbino Inojosa	Mar 31, 1909	(Venezuela) Borburata	Mar 31, 1974	Royal Criollo	Player	^{↔}
Martín Tovar Lange	(?), 1905	(Venezuela) Caracas	Nov 3, 1976	Cerveceria Caracas	Owner/Pioneer	^{↔}
Carlos Lavaud	Dec 10, 1904	(Venezuela) Caracas	Nov 25, 1975	Navegantes del Magallanes	Owner/Pioneer	^{↔}
Juan Reggeti	Jan 3, 1909	(Venezuela) Caracas	Aug 8, 1969	–	Owner/Pioneer	^{↔}
Luis Rodolfo Machado	Jul 9, 1918	(Venezuela) Maracaibo	Jul 2, 1978	–	Owner	^{↔}
Pablo Morales Pérez	Aug 17, 1906	(Venezuela) La Guaira	Nov 24, 1969	–	Owner	^{↔}
Antonio Herrera Gutiérrez	(?), 1910	(Venezuela) Carora	Mar 16, 1969	–	Owner	^{↔}
Carlos González	Oct 14, 1932	(Venezuela) Tucupita	May 24, 2004	–	Journalist/Sportscaster	^{↔}
1959 Pan American Games champion team						^{↔}

=== 2016 ===
Name	Date of birth	Place of birth	Date of death	Primary team	Position	Refs
Rubén Mijares	Dec 10, 1938	(Venezuela) Patanemo		–	Journalist/Sportscaster/Executive	^{‡}
Dionisio Acosta	Mar 20, 1929	(Venezuela) Maracaibo	Jan 16, 2013	–	Player/Union Leader	^{‡}
Carlos Cárdenas Lares	Mar 20, 1973	(Venezuela) Caracas	Mar 1, 1994	–	Writer/Promoter of the creation of Venezuelan Baseball Hall of Fame and Museum	^{‡}

=== 2017 ===
Name	Date of birth	Place of birth	Date of death	Primary team	Position	Refs
**Giovanni Carrara**	Mar 4, 1968	(Venezuela) El Tigre		Cardenales de Lara	Player	^{†}
Adolfo Álvarez	Oct 10, 1930	(Venezuela) Carora	Sep 12, 2016	–	Owner	^{‡}
Marco Antonio Lacavalerie	Jan 31, 1924	(Venezuela) Caracas	Nov 23, 1995	–	Broadcaster	^{‡}

=== 2018 ===
Name	Date of birth	Place of birth	Date of death	Primary team	Position	Refs
Robert Marcano	Jun 7, 1951	(Venezuela) El Clavo	Nov 13, 1990	Tiburones de La Guaira	Player	^{‡}
**Omar Vizquel**	Apr 24, 1967	(Venezuela) Caracas		Leones del Caracas	Player	^{†}

=== 2019 ===
Name	Date of birth	Place of birth	Date of death	Primary team	Position	Refs
**Carlos Ascanio**	Apr 4, 1918	(Venezuela) Santa Lucia	Feb 27, 1998	New York Black Yankees	Player	^{‡}
**Edwin Hurtado**	Feb 1, 1970	(Venezuela) Barquisimeto		Cardenales de Lara	Player	^{†}
**Leonardo Hernández**	Nov 6, 1959	(Venezuela) Santa Lucia		Tigres de Aragua	Player	^{†}

=== 2021 ===
Name	Date of birth	Place of birth	Date of death	Primary team	Position	Refs
**Robert Pérez**	Jun 4, 1969	(Venezuela) Ciudad Bolívar		Cardenales de Lara	Player	^{†}
**Bob Abreu**	Mar 11, 1974	(Venezuela) Turmero		Leones del Caracas	Player	^{†}
**Edgardo Alfonzo**	Nov 8, 1973	(Venezuela) Santa Teresa del Tuy		Navegantes del Magallanes	Player	^{†}

=== 2022 ===
Name	Date of birth	Place of birth	Date of death	Primary team	Position	Refs
**Johan Santana**	Mar 13, 1979	(Venezuela) Tovar		Navegantes del Magallanes	Player	^{†}
**Melvin Mora**	Feb 12, 1972	(Venezuela) Yaracuy		Navegantes del Magallanes	Player	^{†}

=== 2023 ===
Name	Date of birth	Place of birth	Date of death	Primary team	Position	Refs
Oscar Prieto Párraga	Mar 2, 1946	(Venezuela) Caracas		–	Executive	^{‡}
Alfonso Saer	Jun 11, 1947	(Venezuela) Barquisimeto		–	Broadcaster	^{‡}

=== 2024 ===
Name	Date of birth	Place of birth	Date of death	Primary team	Position	Refs
**Richard Garcés**	May 18, 1971	(Venezuela) Maracay		Tigres de Aragua	Player	^{†}
**Ramón Hernández**	May 20, 1976	(Venezuela) Caracas		Navegantes del Magallanes	Player	^{†}
**Juan Carlos Pulido**	Aug 5, 1971	(Venezuela) Caracas	Dec 28, 2023	Navegantes del Magallanes	Player	^{†}

=== 2025 ===
Name	Date of birth	Place of birth	Date of death	Primary team	Position	Refs
**Alex Ramírez**	Oct 3, 1974	(Venezuela) Caracas		Yokohama DeNA BayStars	Player	^{†}
**Félix Hernández**	April 8, 1986	(Venezuela) Valencia		Seattle Mariners	Player	^{†}
**Magglio Ordóñez**	Jan 28, 1974	(Venezuela) Caracas		Detroit Tigers	Player	^{†}
José Ettedgui	June 2, 1924	(Venezuela) Caracas	Sep 19, 2003	–	Executive	^{‡}
Humberto Oropeza				–	Executive	^{‡}

=== 2026 ===
Name	Date of birth	Place of birth	Date of death	Primary team	Position	Refs
**Francisco Rodríguez**	Jan 7, 1982	(Venezuela) Caracas		–	Player	^{†}
**Endy Chávez**	Feb 7, 1978	(Venezuela) Valencia		Navegantes del Magallanes	Player	^{†}
**Tomás Pérez**	Dec 29, 1973	(Venezuela) Barquisimeto		–	Player	^{†}
2026 World Baseball Classic champion team						^{‡}

== See also ==
- Baseball awards § Venezuela
