= Finol =

Finol is a surname. Notable people with the surname include:

- Dalmiro Finol (1920–1994), Venezuelan baseball player
- Yoel Finol (born 1996), Venezuelan flyweight boxer
