= Chucho Ramos =

Venezuelan baseball player (1918–1977)

- Outfielder
- Born: April 12, 1918; Maturín, Venezuela
- Died: September 2, 1977 (aged 59); Caracas, Venezuela
- Batted: Right Threw: Left

MLB debut
- May 7, 1944, for the Cincinnati Reds

Last MLB appearance
- May 30, 1944, for the Cincinnati Reds

MLB statistics
- Batting average: .500
- Home runs: 0
- RBI: 0
- Stats at Baseball Reference

Teams
- Cincinnati Reds (1944)

Career highlights and awards
- Second Venezuelan baseball player in Major League Baseball.

Member of the Venezuelan

Baseball Hall of Fame
- Induction: 2009

Jesús Manuel Ramos García (April 12, 1918 – September 2, 1977) was a Venezuelan outfielder and first baseman in Major League Baseball who played briefly during the 1944 season. Listed at 5' 10.5", 167 lb., Ramos batted right-handed and threw left-handed. Born in Maturín, Venezuela, he played under the name Chucho Ramos, spending much of his career with the Navegantes del Magallanes. Ramos was also a member of the Venezuela national baseball team that won the 1941 Amateur World Series.

== Career ==
Ramos played with the Vargas, Venezuela, and Magallanes clubs of the Venezuelan amateur league, debuting in 1937. He played on the Venezuela national baseball team at the 1941 Amateur World Series in Havana, where they upset the heavily-favored Cuba to take home the champuonship.

Ramos became the second Venezuelan player to appear in a major league game, behind fellow countryman Alex Carrasquel, when he debuted on May 7, 1944 in the National League with the Cincinnati Reds. He went 3-for-4 off Max Lanier of the St. Louis Cardinals. Ramos also was the third player to go straight into the major leagues with no minor league experience, following Carrasquel (1939) and Ted Lyons (1923).

Ramos was heralded as an outstanding defensive player, but back problems shortened his career. In his brief stint with Cincinnati, Ramos went 5-for-10 for a .500 batting average in four games, including a double and one run.

Resuming his career in Venezuela, Ramos returned to Magallanes, which was now part of the newly formed Venezuelan Professional Baseball League. In 12 seasons (1946–1955), he hit .271 with 12 home runs and 162 RBI.

Ramos died of respiratory failure in Caracas, Venezuela, at age of 59.

== See also ==
- List of players from Venezuela in Major League Baseball
