= Highlandale, Mississippi =

- Unincorporated community
- Location within Mississippi Location within the United States
- Coordinates: 33°40′50″N 90°20′38″W
- Country: United States
- State: Mississippi
- County: Leflore
- Elevation: 128 ft (39 m)
- Time zone: UTC-6 (Central (CST))
  - Summer (DST): UTC-5 (CDT)
- ZIP code: 38952
- Area code: 662
- GNIS feature ID: 671197

== History ==
Highlandale is an unincorporated community located in Leflore County, Mississippi, United States. Highlandale is approximately 3 miles (4.8 km) north of Schlater. It is part of the Greenwood, Mississippi micropolitan area.

Highlandale is located on the former Southern Railway and was once home to a depot. The community was also home to a branch line.

A post office operated under the name Hilandale from 1901 to 1904 and under the name Highlandale from 1904 to 1910.
