= Deacon Jones (infielder) =

American baseball player, coach, manager, and scout (1934–2023)

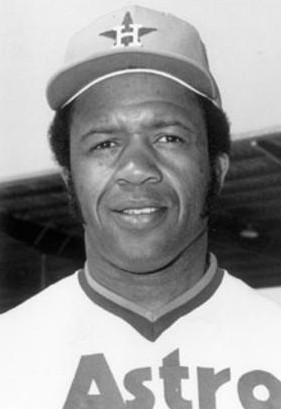
- Jones in 1976
- First baseman
- Born: April 18, 1934; White Plains, New York, U.S.
- Died: May 7, 2023 (aged 89); Sugar Land, Texas, U.S.
- Batted: Left Threw: Right

MLB debut
- September 8, 1962, for the Chicago White Sox

Last MLB appearance
- October 1, 1966, for the Chicago White Sox

MLB statistics
- Batting average: .286
- Home runs: 1
- Runs batted in: 10
- Stats at Baseball Reference

Teams
- Chicago White Sox (1962–1963, 1966)

Grover William "Deacon" Jones (April 18, 1934 – May 7, 2023) was an American professional baseball player, coach, manager and scout. He appeared in 40 Major League games as a first baseman and pinch hitter for the Chicago White Sox (1962–63; 1966).

== Life and career ==
Jones attended Ithaca College.

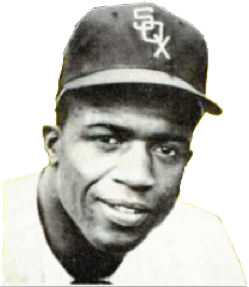
Jones in 1963

In his 11-year minor-league career (1955–56; 1959–67; 1969), Jones batted .319 with 154 home runs and a slugging percentage of .528. His big-league experience consisted of 60 plate appearances and he batted .286 (14 hits in 49 at bats) with one home run (hit off Jim Hannan of the Washington Senators on September 28, 1963) and 10 runs batted in. A great natural hitter, Jones still holds the Midwest League record for the highest single-season batting average when he hit .409 for the Dubuque Packers in 1956. He also had 135 hits, smashed 26 homers and had a .758 slugging percentage in only 330 at bats.

After retiring as a player, Jones served as a scout and minor-league coach and manager in the White Sox organization through 1973. Jones was a coach for the Houston Astros from 1976–82, and with the San Diego Padres from 1984–87. Jones joined the Baltimore Orioles as a minor-league hitting coach and liaison with minority communities.

In later years, Jones served as the special assistant to the president for the Sugar Land Skeeters, a member of the independent Atlantic League of Professional Baseball. He remained as a special advisor when the Skeeters became the Sugar Land Space Cowboys, the Triple-A affiliate of the Houston Astros.

Jones died on May 7, 2023, at the age of 89.
