= Bob Wellman =

American baseball player, manager, and scout (1925-1994)

- Outfielder / First baseman
- Born: July 15, 1925; Norwood, Ohio, U.S.
- Died: December 20, 1994 (aged 69); Villa Hills, Kentucky, U.S.
- Batted: Right Threw: Right

MLB debut
- September 23, 1948, for the Philadelphia Athletics

Last MLB appearance
- June 3, 1950, for the Philadelphia Athletics

MLB statistics
- Batting average: .280
- Home runs: 1
- Runs batted in: 1
- Stats at Baseball Reference

Teams
- Philadelphia Athletics (1948; 1950)

Robert Joseph Wellman (July 15, 1925 – December 20, 1994) was an American professional baseball player, manager and scout. He managed for a quarter-century in minor league baseball, winning more than 1,600 games — with his 1966 Spartanburg Phillies setting a Western Carolinas League record by ripping off a 25-game winning streak. He also briefly played Major League Baseball.

Wellman was a native of Norwood, Ohio. An outfielder and first baseman, he batted and threw right-handed, stood 6 feet 4 inches (1.93 m) tall and weighed 210 pounds (95 kg). He had two brief trials — four games in 1948 and 11 more in 1950 — with the Philadelphia Athletics of the American League, batting .286 in 25 at bats, with one triple, one home run (hit off Mel Parnell of the Boston Red Sox on April 23, 1950, at Shibe Park) and one run batted in. The rest of Wellman's uniformed career would be spent in the minors, first as a player (he led his league in home runs over four consecutive seasons, 1954–1957, including the Class A Western International League), then as a playing manager and manager.

His managing career began in 1955 with the Douglas Trojans, a Class D affiliate of the Cincinnati Reds in the Georgia State League, where his club finished in first place but fell in the playoffs. He would handle teams in the farm systems of the Reds (1955–1959), Philadelphia Phillies (1961–1976) and New York Mets (1977–1980), compiling a win–loss record of 1,663 wins, 1,440 defeats (.536) with three playoff championships. His 1966 Spartanburg squad — which featured future major leaguers Larry Bowa, Denny Doyle, Barry Lersch, Ron Allen and Lowell Palmer — won 91 of 126 regular-season games, a .722 winning percentage (equivalent to 117 victories over a 162-game season). However, he spent only part of one season as a manager at the Triple-A level, with the 1970 Eugene Emeralds of the Pacific Coast League, and was released on May 25 after his team dropped 28 of its first 43 games. The next year, he resumed his success in Spartanburg.

After leading the 1980 Jackson Mets into the Texas League playoffs, Wellman hung up his uniform and became a Mets scout. He died in Villa Hills, Kentucky, at the age of 69.
