= Dave Hoskins =

American baseball player (1917–1970)

- Pitcher
- Born: August 3, 1917; Greenwood, Mississippi, U.S.
- Died: April 2, 1970 (aged 52); Flint, Michigan, U.S.
- Batted: Left Threw: Right

Professional debut
- NgL: 1942, for the Cincinnati Clowns
- MLB: April 18, 1953, for the Cleveland Indians

Last MLB appearance
- September 21, 1954, for the Cleveland Indians

MLB statistics
- Win–loss record: 9–4
- Earned run average: 3.81
- Innings pitched: 139 1/3
- Stats at Baseball Reference

Teams
- Negro leagues: Cincinnati Clowns (1942); Chicago American Giants (1943); Homestead Grays (1944–1946); Louisville Buckeyes (1949); Major League Baseball: Cleveland Indians (1953–1954)

Career highlights and awards
- NgL All-Star (1949)

David Will Hoskins (August 3, 1917 – April 2, 1970) was an American professional baseball player: a right-handed pitcher who appeared in 26 games for the Cleveland Indians of Major League Baseball during the 1953 season and 14 games during the 1954 campaign. Born in Greenwood, Mississippi, he moved to Flint, Michigan, shortly after graduating from high school in Highlandale in 1935. In Flint, he became an autoworker at General Motors and played semiprofessional baseball.

Hoskins batted left-handed; he stood 6 feet 1 inch (1.85 m) tall and weighed 180 pounds (82 kg).

== Negro leagues ==
Hoskins' professional career began in the Negro leagues with the Cincinnati Clowns in 1942. He also played for the Chicago American Giants, Homestead Grays and Louisville Buckeyes through 1949.

== Minor leagues ==
Hoskins was the first African-American to play in the Double-A Texas League, pitching for the Dallas Eagles in 1952. He faced much the same kind of hostility that Jackie Robinson did when he first broke into the majors five years earlier. Though players loved him, some fans cursed and taunted him, especially outside Dallas. At first, he was not allowed to play in Shreveport when the Eagles traveled there to play the Shreveport Sports.

Hoskins won 22 games for the Dallas Eagles in 1952 with a 2.12 earned run average. The pitcher made the All-Star team and also hit .328, an outstanding average for a moundsman. Six years later, he won 17 more games for the renamed Dallas Rangers in the same circuit.

== Major League Baseball ==
Hoskins made the big-league Indians in 1953, going 9–3 with a 3.99 ERA. The following year, he had an ERA of 3.04, as the Indians won the American League pennant.

In 139 1/3 major league innings, Hoskins allowed 131 hits and 48 bases on balls. He struck out 64.

As a hitter, Hoskins was better than average, posting a .227 batting average (15-for-66) with 12 runs, 1 home run and 9 RBI. He was used as a pinch-hitter 16 times in his brief major league career. Defensively, he handled 40 total chances (9 putouts, 31 assists) without an error for a perfect 1.000 fielding percentage.

== Death ==
Hoskins died from a heart attack in Flint on April 2, 1970, at 52 years of age.

== See also ==
- List of Negro league baseball players who played in Major League Baseball
