= Sabios de Vargas =

Information
- League: Independent (1907–1909); Venezuelan First Division (1937–1945); Venezuelan Professional Baseball League (1946–1953)
- Location: Caracas, Venezuela
- Ballpark: Estadio Cerveza Caracas
- Established: 1907
- Disbanded: 1953

The Sabios de Vargas (English: Vargas Wisemen) was a baseball club that became a founding member of the Venezuelan Professional Baseball League in its inaugural season of 1946. Though the team originally represented the city of La Guaira, Vargas, it played its home games in Caracas, at the now-extinct Estadio Cerveza Caracas.

== History ==
=== Amateur success ===
The first baseball club to bear the name Vargas was founded in 1907 by sports promoter Vicente Ortega, made up of a roster of youth from La Guaira State. After several decades, the name reemerged under the ownership of Juan Reggetti, Oscar “Negro” Prieto y Pablo Morales in 1937. That year, Vargas won the first division amateur tournament under the management of Pelayo Chacón; it would win successive amateur titles in 1939 (under Chacon) and 1940 (under Isidro Fabré). During this period, the team's roster included native Venezuelan players such as Vidal López, Carlos "Terremoto" Ascanio, and Chucho Ramos, as well as foreign imports from Negro league baseball such as Ray Dandridge (nicknamed "Talúa" in Venezuela) and Alejandro Oms.

=== Professionalization ===
The VPBL opening game was realized on January 12, 1946. Besides Vargas, the circuit included the Cervecería Caracas, Navegantes del Magallanes and Patriotas de Venezuela teams, which resulted in a revised schedule of 30 games in which each team played its three opponents 10 times apiece. During the first season, the games were played on Thursdays and Saturdays on the afternoons, and Sundays in the morning. When the ballpark was fitted with electric lights, a game was added on Tuesday nights.

In 1946 Vargas was co-managed by pitcher Daniel Canónico and catcher Roy Campanella, both of whom led the team to the title with an 18–12 record. Notably, pitcher Roy Welmaker hurled in 25 of the 30 games, including 25 starts, and posted a 12–8 record with 139 strikeouts and a 2.68 earned run average in 181 2/3 innings of work. Welmaker led the league in victories, strikeouts and ERA to win easily the Triple crown.

The league divided the 1946–47 season in two parts, while the number of games in the schedule was increased to 36. The final Championship Series faced first-half winner Vargas against Cervecería, second-half champ, in a best-of-five series. Vargas defeated Cervecería, 3 to 1, to become the first team to win consecutive titles in the league.

Vargas finished second in 1947–48, but retired during the 1948–49 season due to economical problems. Eventually, the team continued to play for the next four seasons but never was able to recover its initial prestige, before finally folding at the end of the 1952–53 season. They changed their name to the Santa Marta BBC in 1954.

== Yearly team records ==
Year	Record	Finish	Manager	Notes
1946	18–12	1st	Daniel Canónico; Roy Campanella	Won league title
1946–47	11–7 (1st half); 6–12 (2nd half)	1st 3rd	Ernesto Aparicio; Daniel Canónico	Won championship title
1947–48	24–15	2nd	Roy Campanella	
1948–49	5–10	–	José Rodríguez	Retired before the season ended
1949–50	17–31	4th	Pelayo Chacón; Raymond Brown	
1950–51	27–27	3rd	Ford Garrison	
1951–52	22–35	4th	Ford Garrison	
1952–53	26–31	4th	José Antonio Casanova	

== Players of note ==
- Bob Alexander
- Luis Aparicio, Sr.
- Carlos Ascanio
- Frank Austin
- Frank Baldwin
- Sam Bankhead
- Clarence Beers
- Frank Biscan
- Roy Campanella
- Daniel Canónico
- Bill Cash
- Walt Chipple
- Larry Ciaffone
- Al Cihocki
- Claude Corbitt
- Emilio Cueche
- Clem Dreisewerd
- Jim Dyck
- Howard Easterling
- Robert Elliott
- Jonas Gaines
- Ford Garrison
- Tom Glover
- Sam Hairston
- Hal Hudson
- Sam Jethroe
- Walt Lanfranconi
- Les Layton
- Lynn Lovenguth
- Clyde McNeal
- Frank Mancuso
- Don Newcombe
- Andrew Porter
- William Ricks
- Harry Simpson
- Hilton Smith
- Tommy Warren
- Roy Welmaker
- Marvin Williams
- Johnnie Wittig
- John Wright
- Lenny Yochim

== Bibliography ==
- Javier González; Carlos Figueroa Ruiz. Campos de Gloria: El beisbol en Venezuela, 127 años de historia 1895-2022 (PDF) (in Spanish). Biblioteca Digital Banesco.
