= Tom Glover (baseball) =

Negro League Baseball player (1912–1948)

- Pitcher
- Born: 1912
- Died: June 7, 1948 (aged 35–36); Baltimore, Maryland, U.S.
- Batted: Right Threw: Left

Negro league baseball debut
- 1934, for the Cleveland Red Sox

Last appearance
- 1945, for the Baltimore Elite Giants
- Stats at Baseball Reference

Teams
- Cleveland Red Sox (1934); Birmingham Black Barons (1934); Columbus Elite Giants (1935); Washington Elite Giants (1937); Baltimore Elite Giants (1938–1939, 1942–1945); Nuevo Laredo Tecolotes (1940); Unión Laguna de Torreón (1940); Carta Blanca / Industriales de Monterrey (1941, 1945)

Thomas "Lefty" Glover (1912 – June 7, 1948) was an American professional baseball player in the Negro leagues and the Mexican League. He played from 1934 to 1945 with several teams.
