= Gavilanes de Maracaibo =

Former Venezuelan baseball team

Information
- League: Liga Occidental de Béisbol Profesional; Venezuelan Professional Baseball League (1953–54)
- Ballpark: Estadio Olímpico Alejandro Borges; Maracaibo, Venezuela
- Founded: 1928
- Folded: 1960
- Nickname(s): Los Muchachos (The Boys)
- Colors: Dark blue, white

Current uniforms
| Home | Away |

The Gavilanes de Maracaibo (English: Maracaibo Sparrowhawks) was a Venezuelan professional baseball club based in Maracaibo, the capital city of Zulia state. The team was founded by the brothers and ballplayers Ernesto Aparicio and Luis Aparicio, Sr., played in various leagues in the western part of country, debuting in the Zulia Baseball League First Division (1932–52) and playing most of the rest of their existence in the Liga Occidental de Béisbol Profesional (Western League).

The Gavilanes were the most successful team of the Zulia league, winning 13 of the 17 tournaments played, eight with Ernesto Aparicio at the helm. As a result, Gavilanes and the Pastora BBC maintained a strong and fierce rivalry on the baseball field during the existence of the league. Accustomed to second place in the standings, Pastora captured the 1934 and 1948 titles while the Orange Victoria team won in the 1951 season.

The Zulia league folded at the end of the 1940 season, resuming operations in 1946 but shuttering for good in 1952. After that, the western circuit was renamed Liga Occidental de Béisbol Profesional (LOBP), which joined MLB-affiliated organized baseball in 1953 and operated continuously until 1964.

In 1953, the Venezuelan Professional Baseball League and the recent created LOBP agreed to have the most representative clubs from each circuit meet in a National Championship Series called El Rotatorio, the first and only in VPBL history. The Cervecería Caracas and Navegantes del Magallanes clubs represented the VPBL, while Gavilanes and Pastora represented the LOBP. The Gavilanes were managed by Red Kress, a former major league shortstop and minor league manager.

The pennant was clinched by the Pastora club with a 48-30 record, winning easily over Magallanes (40-37), Gavilanes (34-44) and Caracas (33-44). The disappointing Gavilanes were a favorite to grasp the championship, as the team featured a remarkably well-balanced squad headed by pitchers Alejandro Carrasquel, Bob Chakales, Emilio Cueche, Art Houtteman, Sad Sam Jones, Elmer Singleton, Bill Upton and Lenny Yochim; catchers Earl Averill and Hank Foiles; infielders Piper Davis (2B/3B), Dalmiro Finol (3B/2B/1B) and Lee Thomas (1B); outfielders Joe Frazier (RF), Jim Lemon (LF) and Dave Pope (CF), and a 19-year-old rookie shortstop named Luis Aparicio, Jr., who in 1984 would become the first Venezuelan player to be enshrined in the Baseball Hall of Fame.

The Gavilanes came back to the Occidental League for the 1954-55 season, winning consecutive titles in the 1955-56 and 1956-57 tournaments. Out in the 1957-58 season, Gavilanes returned as a replacement for the Centauros de Maracaibo in 1958-59 and played its last season in 1959-60.

The LOBP ceased operations after the 1963-64 season. Since then, no other team named Gavilanes has participated in Venezuelan professional baseball.

== Highlights ==
- Legendary Venezuelan manager Ernesto Aparicio finished with nine managing titles (1933, 1937, 1940, 1946–1947, 1949–1952; 1955-56).
- Managers Lázaro Salazar (Cuba) and Luis Rodríguez Olmo (Puerto Rico) also led the team to the title (1938 and 1948, respectively).
- Pitcher Barney Schultz won seven consecutive strikeout titles (1954-55 through 1960-61).
- Pitcher Dave Hoskins posted the most wins in three consecutive seasons (1955-56 – 1957-58) and the best ERA in a single season (1956-57).
- Pitcher Bill Harris collected the best ERA in a single season (1959-60).
- Outfielder Billy Queen won the home runs and RBI titles in a single season (1958-59).
- First baseman Joe Altobelli won the batting title in a single season (1955-56).

== Sources ==
- Gutiérrez, Daniel; Alvarez, Efraim; Gutiérrez (h), Daniel (2006). La Enciclopedia del Béisbol en Venezuela. LVBP, Caracas. ISBN 980-6996-02-X
- Gutiérrez, Daniel; González, Javier (1992). Numeritos del béisbol profesional venezolano (1946-1992). LVBP, Caracas. ISBN 980-0712-47-X
- Salas, Alexis (1988). Los eternos rivales 1908–1988: Caracas–Magallanes, Pastora–Gavilanes. Seguros Caracas, Caracas. ISBN 980-3003-92-5
