= Patriotas de Venezuela =

The Patriotas de Venezuela baseball club was a founding member of the Venezuelan Professional Baseball League in its inaugural season of 1946.

== Team history ==
The Patriotas, based in Caracas, played its home games at the now-extinct Estadio Cerveza Caracas, while appearing in nine seasons spanning 1946–1955. The team was also nicknamed the Criollos for a while.

The VPBL opening game was realized on January 12, 1946. Besides Venezuela, the circuit included the Cervecería Caracas, Navegantes del Magallanes, and Sabios de Vargas teams.

The Patriotas were owned and established by Juan Antonio Yanes, one of the early pioneers of professional baseball in the country, who also managed his team in parts of two seasons. In addition, both Paul Richards, Eddie Popowski and Junior Thompson will manage the team at some point.

Venezuela recorded 162 wins and 228 losses during its time in the league, and never had a winning season or made the playoffs.

The Patriotas were out during the 1953-54 season due to economic issues. They reappeared in 1954-55, but folded at the end of the season. Following a change of ownership, the new owners renamed the franchise as the Licoreros de Pampero starting the 1955-56 season.

== Yearly team records ==
Season	Record	Finish	Manager
1946	15-16	3rd (Lost 2nd place tie-breaker)	Juan Antonio Yanes; Tom Glover
1946-47	7-11 (1st half); 5-13 (2nd half)	4th 4th	Juan Antonio Yanes
1947-48	13-26	4th	León Díaz
1948-49	14-17	3rd	León Díaz
1949-50	17-28	3rd	Alberto Hidalgo
1950-51	19-34	4th	Alberto Hidalgo; Rogelio López
1951-52	23-34	3rd	Junior Thompson
1952-53	26-31	3rd	Reinaldo Cordeiro
1954-55	23-28	3rd	Paul Richards; Eddie Popowski

== Team highlights ==
- 1946-47: Parnell Woods, champion bat with a .354 average.
- 1947-48: Luke Easter, league leader with eight home runs.
- 1948-49: Roy Welmaker, most strikeouts by a pitcher with 102.
- 1949-50: Santiago Ullrich, Triple crown pitching winner with eight wins, 59 strikeouts and a 2.74 ERA.
- 1950-51: René González, league leader with 50 runs batted in, while tying with Vargas' Frank Mancuso for the most homers with 10.
- 1952-53: Hank Schenz, champion bat with a .355 average.
- 1954-55: Harold Bevan, champion bat with a .350 average.

== Other noted players ==
- Red Adams
- Luis Aloma
- Carlos Ascanio
- Eddie Basinski
- Don Buddin
- Daniel Canónico
- Ed Chandler
- Lorenzo Davis
- Wilmer Fields
- Ben Flowers
- Joe Frazier
- Russ Kerns
- Julián Ladera
- Red Lynn
- Pete Milne
- Mickey Owen
- Al Papai
- Roy Partlow
- Dave Pope
- Saul Rogovin
- Luis Romero Petit
- Bob Smith
- Gene Stephens
- Max Surkont
- George Susce
- Bill Webb
- Dewey Williams
- José Zardón
- Pedro Miranda
- Gaspar del Monte

== Sources ==
- Gutiérrez, Daniel; Alvarez, Efraim; Gutiérrez (h), Daniel (2006). La Enciclopedia del Béisbol en Venezuela. LVBP, Caracas. ISBN 980-6996-02-X
- Gutiérrez, Daniel; González, Javier (1992). Numeritos del béisbol profesional venezolano (1946-1992). LVBP, Caracas. ISBN 980-0712-47-X
