= Billy Queen (baseball) =

American baseball player (1928-2006)

- Outfielder / Pinch hitter
- Born: November 28, 1928; Gastonia, North Carolina, U.S.
- Died: April 23, 2006 (aged 77); Gastonia, North Carolina, U.S.
- Batted: Right Threw: Right

MLB debut
- April 13, 1954, for the Milwaukee Braves

Last MLB appearance
- April 25, 1954, for the Milwaukee Braves

MLB statistics
- Games played: 3
- At bats: 2
- Hits: 0
- Stats at Baseball Reference

Teams
- Milwaukee Braves (1954)

William Eddleman Queen (November 28, 1928 – April 23, 2006), nicknamed "Doc", was an American outfielder in Major League Baseball. Listed at 6 feet 1 inch (1.85 m), 185 pounds (84 kg), he batted and threw right-handed.

The native of Gastonia, North Carolina, was 25 years old when he entered the Majors in 1954 with the Milwaukee Braves. A right fielder, he was hitless in his only two at bats in three games. He struck out against Harvey Haddix of the St. Louis Cardinals on April 24, and whiffed the following day against Al Brazle. He then was sent to the Triple-A Toledo Sox to continue what would be a 14-season (1947–1960) minor league career.

Queen died in Gastonia, at the age of 77.

== See also ==
- 1954 Milwaukee Braves season
- Atlanta Braves all-time roster
