= List of baseball players who have played in the Caribbean Series =

The following is a list of baseball players who have played in the Caribbean Series (Serie del Caribe).

== A ==
- (Venezuela) Bobby Abreu
- (Dominican Republic) José Acevedo
- (Mexico) Cy Acosta
- (United States) Red Adams
- (Canada) Bob Alexander
- (Puerto Rico) Juan Agosto
- (Puerto Rico) Luis Aguayo
- (United States) Bob Allison
- (Dominican Republic) Héctor Almonte
- (Puerto Rico) Roberto Alomar
- (Puerto Rico) Sandy Alomar Sr.
- (Dominican Republic) Felipe Alou
- (Dominican Republic) Jesús Alou
- (Dominican Republic) Matty Alou
- (Nicaragua) Porfi Altamirano
- (Cuba) Rogelio Álvarez
- (United States) George Altman
- (Mexico) Alfredo Amézaga
- (Cuba) Sandy Amorós
- (United States) Larry Anderson
- (United States) Rick Anderson
- (Dominican Republic) Joaquín Andújar
- (Venezuela) Luis Aparicio
- (Venezuela) Luis Aponte
- (Venezuela) Tony Armas
- (United States) Fernando Arroyo
- (Puerto Rico) Luis Arroyo
- (United States) Bob Aspromonte
- (Puerto Rico) Ramón Avilés
- (Dominican Republic) Erick Aybar
- (Cuba) Joe Azcue
- (Venezuela) Oscar Azócar

== B ==
- (United States) Cory Bailey
- (United States) Ed Bailey
- (United States) Dan Bankhead
- (United States) Steve Barber
- (Mexico) Salomé Barojas
- (Mexico) Nelson Barrera
- (Dominican Republic) Tony Batista
- (United States) Earl Battey
- (Dominican Republic) Denny Bautista
- (Dominican Republic) José Bautista (3B)
- (Dominican Republic) José Bautista (P)
- (United States) Jim Baxes
- (United States) Don Baylor
- (United States) Ralph Beard
- (United States) Gene Bearden
- (United States) Jim Beauchamp
- (Cuba) Julio Bécquer
- (United States) Joe Beckwith
- (Dominican Republic) George Bell
- (United States) Ronnie Belliard
- (Puerto Rico) Carlos Beltrán
- (Venezuela) Héctor Benítez
- (United States) Vern Benson
- (Cuba) Yuniesky Betancourt
- (United States) Dave Bergman
- (United States) Harold Bevan
- (United States) Babe Birrer
- (United States) Charlie Bishop
- (United States) Bud Black (1950s)
- (United States) Bud Black (1980s)
- (United States) Wayne Blackburn
- (Venezuela) Dámaso Blanco
- (Venezuela) Gregor Blanco
- (Venezuela) Henry Blanco
- (Puerto Rico) Hiram Bocachica
- (United States) Bruce Bochy
- (Dominican Republic) Emilio Bonifacio
- (Puerto Rico) Bobby Bonilla
- (Dominican Republic) Pedro Borbón
- (United States) Rich Bordi
- (United States) Derek Botelho
- (United States) Bob Boyd
- (Venezuela) José Bracho
- (United States) Jackie Brandt
- (Venezuela) Ángel Bravo
- (United States) Sid Bream
- (United States) Tom Brennan
- (United States) Chet Brewer
- (United States) Tommy Brown
- (United States) Willard Brown
- (United States) George Brunet
- (United States) Derek Bryant
- (United States) Ralph Bryant
- (Mexico) Lorenzo Bundy
- (United States) Jim Bunning
- (Cuba) Juan Bustabad
- (United States) Tommy Byrne

== C ==
- (Venezuela) Alex Cabrera
- (Dominican Republic) Daniel Cabrera
- (Cuba) Lorenzo Cabrera
- (Dominican Republic) Melky Cabrera
- (Venezuela) Miguel Cabrera
- (United States) Joe Caffie
- (Puerto Rico) Iván Calderón
- (Venezuela) Alberto Callaspo
- (United States) Casey Candaele
- (United States) Tom Candiotti
- (Dominican Republic) Robinson Canó
- (Cuba) José Canseco
- (Dominican Republic) José Capellán
- (United States) Bernie Carbo
- (Cuba) José Cardenal
- (Cuba) Leo Cárdenas
- (Panama) Rod Carew
- (Venezuela) Giovanni Carrara
- (Venezuela) Alex Carrasquel
- (Venezuela) Chico Carrasquel
- (Venezuela) Amalio Carreño
- (Mexico) Xorge Carrillo
- (Dominican Republic) Rico Carty
- (United States) Norm Cash
- (Mexico) Vinny Castilla
- (Dominican Republic) Alberto Castillo
- (Dominican Republic) Braulio Castillo
- (Dominican Republic) Carmen Castillo
- (Mexico) Jesus Castillo
- (Venezuela) José Castillo
- (Dominican Republic) Bernie Castro
- (Dominican Republic) Fabio Castro
- (Dominican Republic) César Cedeño
- (Venezuela) Ronny Cedeño
- (Puerto Rico) Orlando Cepeda
- (Venezuela) Elio Chacón
- (United States) Sam Chapman
- (United States) Harry Chiti
- (United States) Randy Choate
- (Puerto Rico) Alex Cintrón
- (United States) Bryan Clark
- (United States) Rickey Clark
- (United States) Webbo Clarke
- (United States) Buster Clarkson
- (Canada) Reggie Cleveland
- (Puerto Rico) Roberto Clemente
- (Puerto Rico) Willie Collazo
- (United States) Terry Collins
- (Dominican Republic) Jesús Colomé
- (Dominican Republic) Bartolo Colón
- (Venezuela) Dave Concepción
- (Puerto Rico) Onix Concepción
- (United States) Chuck Connors
- (Cuba) José Contreras
- (Puerto Rico) Alex Cora
- (United States) Doug Corbett
- (United States) Pat Corrales
- (United States) Pete Coscarart
- (United States) Henry Cotto
- (United States) Wes Covington
- (United States) Joe Cowley
- (United States) Jim Cronin
- (United States) George Crowe
- (Dominican Republic) Francisco Cruceta
- (Puerto Rico) Héctor Cruz
- (Puerto Rico) José Cruz
- (Dominican Republic) Nelson Cruz
- (United States) Bobby Cuellar
- (Cuba) Mike Cuellar

== D ==
- (Venezuela) Pompeyo Davalillo
- (Venezuela) Víctor Davalillo
- (Jamaica) Chili Davis
- (United States) Glenn Davis
- (United States) Tommy Davis
- (United States) Willie Davis
- (Dominican Republic) Valerio de los Santos
- (United States) Cot Deal
- (United States) Joe Decker
- (Venezuela) Alex Delgado
- (Puerto Rico) Carlos Delgado
- (Puerto Rico) Luis de León
- (Mexico) Elmer Dessens
- (Venezuela) Baudilio (Bo) Díaz
- (Dominican Republic) Joselo Díaz
- (Dominican Republic) Víctor Díaz
- (Dominican Republic) Miguel Diloné
- (United States) Tom Dixon
- (United States) Dan Dobbek
- (United States) Pat Dodson
- (United States) Solly Drake
- (United States) Art Ditmar
- (Mexico) Erubiel Durazo
- (United States) Leon Durham
- (United States) Jerry Dybzinski

== E ==
- (United States) Luke Easter
- (United States) Robert Ellis
- (United States) Don Elston
- (Dominican Republic) Edwin Encarnación
- (Puerto Rico) Nino Escalera
- (Mexico) Héctor Espino
- (Mexico) Francisco Estrada

== F ==
- (United States) Bob Fallon
- (United States) Carmen Fanzone
- (United States) Turk Farrell
- (Puerto Rico) Pedro Feliciano
- (Dominican Republic) Félix Fermín
- (Cuba) Chico Fernández
- (Venezuela) Tony Fernández
- (United States) Wilmer Fields
- (Puerto Rico) Luis Figueroa
- (United States) Nelson Figueroa
- (United States) Tommy Fine
- (Venezuela) Dalmiro Finol
- (Cuba) Andrés Fleitas
- (Cuba) Pedro Formental
- (Cuba) Mike Fornieles
- (United States) Ray Fosse
- (United States) Art Fowler
- (United States) Alan Fowlkes
- (United States) Howie Fox
- (United States) Tito Francona
- (United States) Owen Friend

== G ==
- (Venezuela) Andrés Galarraga
- (Dominican Republic) Dámaso García
- (United States) Dave Garcia
- (Mexico) Karim García
- (United States) Ron Gardenhire
- (United States) Jim Gentile
- (Dominican Republic) César Gerónimo
- (Mexico) Gerónimo Gil
- (Venezuela) Gustavo Gil
- (United States) Jim Gilliam
- (United States) Al Gionfriddo
- (United States) Dan Gladden
- (Dominican Republic) Alexis Gómez
- (Puerto Rico) Rubén Gómez
- (Venezuela) Álex González
- (Mexico) Édgar González
- (Venezuela) Geremi González
- (Puerto Rico) Juan González
- (Cuba) René González
- (Cuba) Tony González
- (Puerto Rico) Rubén Gotay
- (United States) Milt Graff
- (Nicaragua) David Green
- (United States) Pumpsie Green
- (United States) David Grier
- (United States) Ken Griffey Sr.
- (Dominican Republic) Alfredo Griffin
- (Cuba) Mike Guerra
- (Dominican Republic) Pedro Guerrero
- (Dominican Republic) Vladimir Guerrero
- (Venezuela) Ozzie Guillén
- (United States) Larry Gura
- (Venezuela) Franklin Gutiérrez
- (Puerto Rico) José Guzmán
- (Dominican Republic) Freddy Guzmán
- (Venezuela) Jesús Guzmán

== H ==
- (United States) Bert Haas
- (United States) Luther Hackman
- (United States) Kevin Hagen
- (United States) Jerry Hairston Sr.
- (United States) Garvin Hamner
- (United States) Chuck Harmon
- (United States) Bill Harris
- (United States) Mickey Hatcher
- (United States) Joe Hatten
- (United States) Gorman Heimueller
- (United States) Rickey Henderson
- (United States Virgin Islands) Elrod Hendricks
- (United States) Gail Henley
- (Venezuela) Ubaldo Heredia
- (Puerto Rico) Jesús Hernáiz
- (Dominican Republic) Anderson Hernández
- (Venezuela) Carlos Hernández
- (Venezuela) Enzo Hernández
- (Cuba) Jackie Hernández
- (Venezuela) Leonardo Hernández
- (Venezuela) Ramón Hernández
- (Puerto Rico) Roberto Hernández
- (Puerto Rico) Willie Hernández
- (Venezuela) José Herrera
- (United States) Johnny Hetki
- (United States) Buddy Hicks
- (United States) Bobo Holloman
- (Canada) Bob Hooper
- (United States) Burt Hooton
- (United States) Mike Howard
- (United States) Trenidad Hubbard
- (Panama) Tom Hughes
- (United States) Mark Huismann
- (United States) Ken Hunt
- (United States) Clint Hurdle

== I ==
- (United States) Monte Irvin

== J ==
- (United States) Reggie Jackson
- (United States) Ron Jackson
- (United States) Spook Jacobs
- (United States) Dion James
- (United States) Larry Jaster
- (Puerto Rico) Stan Javier
- (United States) Sam Jethroe
- (Dominican Republic) Elvio Jiménez
- (Mexico) Houston Jiménez
- (United States) Howard Johnson
- (United States) Chris Jones

—Gary Jones - Ponce 1972 (2 wins 0 losses)

- (United States) Odell Jones
- (United States) Sam Jones
- (United States) Sad Sam Jones
- (United States) Spider Jorgensen

== K ==
- (United States) Jeff Kaiser
- (United States) Mike Kekich
- (United States) Pat Kelly
- (United States) Thornton Kipper
- (United States) Bill Kirk
- (United States) Lou Klein

== L ==
- (United States) Clem Labine
- (Dominican Republic) Rafael Landestoy
- (United States) Tony Larussa
- (United States) Tommy Lasorda
- (Cuba) George Lauzerique
- (United States) Rudy Law
- (United States) Tom Lawless
- (United States) Brooks Lawrence
- (Venezuela) Luis Leal
- (United States) Craig Lefferts
- (United States) Ron LeFlore
- (United States) Justin Lehr
- (United States) Dave Leonhard
- (Mexico) Maximino León
- (United States) Dennis Lewallyn
- (United States) Jim Lewis
- (Dominican Republic) José Lima
- (United States) Lou Limmer
- (Puerto Rico) Francisco Lindor
- (Venezuela) Felipe Lira
- (United States) Jack Lohrke
- (Mexico) Aurelio López
- (Panama) Héctor López
- (Puerto Rico) Javy López
- (Mexico) Rodrigo López
- (Venezuela) Urbano Lugo
- (United States) Jerry Lynch

== M ==
- (Cuba) Héctor Maestri
- (Puerto Rico) Candy Maldonado
- (Venezuela) Carlos Maldonado
- (Venezuela) Fred Manrique
- (Puerto Rico) Félix Mantilla
- (United States) Jerry Manuel
- (Dominican Republic) Ravelo Manzanillo
- (Venezuela) Robert Marcano
- (United States) Joe Margoneri
- (Dominican Republic) Juan Marichal
- (Dominican Republic) Carlos Mármol
- (Venezuela) Gonzalo Márquez
- (Puerto Rico) Canena Márquez
- (Cuba) Connie Marrero
- (United States) Buck Martinez
- (Venezuela) Café Martínez
- (Puerto Rico) Carmelo Martínez
- (Puerto Rico) Edgar Martínez
- (Dominican Republic) Pedro Martínez
- (Dominican Republic) Sandy Martínez
- (Dominican Republic) Teodoro Martínez
- (Puerto Rico) Luis Matos
- (Cuba) Agapito Mayor
- (United States) Willie Mays
- (Venezuela) Luis Maza
- (United States) Lloyd McClendon
- (United States) Mark McGwire
- (Cuba) Román Mejías
- (Venezuela) Jackson Melián
- (Mexico) Mario Mendoza
- (Puerto Rico) Orlando Mercado
- (United States) Jim Merritt
- (United States) Ed Mierkowicz
- (United States) Eddie Miller
- (Cuba) Minnie Miñoso
- (Puerto Rico) Bengie Molina
- (Puerto Rico) José Molina
- (Puerto Rico) Yadier Molina
- (Mexico) Sid Monge
- (Cuba) Aurelio Monteagudo
- (Cuba) René Monteagudo
- (Venezuela) Ray Monzant
- (United States) Wally Moon
- (United States) Junior Moore
- (Venezuela) Melvin Mora
- (United States Virgin Islands) José Morales
- (United States) Seth Morehead
- (Venezuela) Orber Moreno
- (Puerto Rico) Roger Moret
- (Venezuela) Guillermo Moscoso
- (United States) Les Moss
- (Dominican Republic) Manny Mota
- (United States) Billy Muffett
- (Mexico) Agustín Murillo
- (United States) Bob Muncrief
- (United States) Dwayne Murphy
- (Cuba) Ronnier Mustelier

== N ==
- (Cuba) Cholly Naranjo
- (Puerto Rico) Julio Navarro
- (United States) Charlie Neal
- (United States) Rocky Nelson
- (United States) Randy Niemann
- (United States) Donell Nixon
- (Cuba) Ray Noble
- (Puerto Rico) Edwin Núñez
- (Cuba) Vladimir Núñez

== O ==
- (Puerto Rico) Francisco Oliveras
- (Puerto Rico) José Oquendo
- (Dominican Republic) David Ortiz
- (Cuba) Roberto Ortiz
- (United States) Eric Owens
- (United States) Jim Owens
- (Dominican Republic) Pablo Ozuna

== P ==
- (Puerto Rico) José Pagán
- (United States) Satchel Paige
- (Cuba) Rafael Palmeiro
- (Venezuela) Johnny Paredes
- (Cuba) Camilo Pascual
- (Cuba) Carlos Pascual
- (Cuba) Carlos Paula
- (United States) Les Peden
- (Venezuela) Al Pedrique
- (Dominican Republic) Jailen Peguero
- (Dominican Republic) Alejandro Peña
- (Dominican Republic) Carlos Peña
- (Mexico) José Peña
- (Cuba) Orlando Peña
- (Dominican Republic) Tony Peña
- (Dominican Republic) Tony Peña Jr.
- (Dominican Republic) Carlos Pérez
- (Mexico) Óliver Pérez
- (Dominican Republic) Pascual Pérez
- (Cuba) Tony Pérez
- (Dominican Republic) Timo Pérez
- (United States) Alonzo Perry
- (Venezuela) Gregorio Petit
- (United States) Ken Phelps
- (United States) Mike Piazza
- (United States) Lou Piniella
- (Puerto Rico) Juan Pizarro
- (United States) Herb Plews
- (Venezuela) Gus Polidor
- (Puerto Rico) Vic Power
- (Dominican Republic) Luis Pujols
- (Mexico) Alfonso Pulido

== Q ==
- (Puerto Rico) Luis Quiñones

== R ==
- (Dominican Republic) Hanley Ramírez
- (Dominican Republic) Manny Ramírez
- (Cuba) Bobby Ramos
- (Venezuela) Chucho Ramos
- (Cuba) Pedro Ramos
- (Venezuela) Wilson Ramos
- (United States) Jim Ray
- (United States) Floyd Rayford
- (Dominican Republic) Gilberto Reyes
- (Dominican Republic) José Reyes
- (Venezuela) René Reyes
- (Dominican Republic) José Rijo
- (Puerto Rico) Alex Ríos
- (Puerto Rico) Armando Ríos
- (United States) Jay Ritchie
- (United States) Jim Rivera
- (Panama) Rubén Rivera
- (United States) Curt Roberts
- (United States) Frank Robinson
- (Mexico) Óscar Robles
- (Dominican Republic) Rafael Robles
- (Mexico) Sergio Robles
- (Dominican Republic) Alex Rodríguez
- (Venezuela) Francisco Rodríguez
- (Cuba) Héctor Rodríguez
- (Puerto Rico) Iván Rodríguez
- (Puerto Rico) Luis Rodríguez-Olmo
- (Cuba) Cookie Rojas
- (Mexico) Vicente Romo
- (Puerto Rico) Luis Rosado
- (United States) John Roseboro
- (United States) Ken Rowe
- (Canada) Jean-Pierre Roy
- (United States) Michael Ryan

== S ==
- (Venezuela) Argenis Salazar
- (Venezuela) Luis Salazar
- (Venezuela) Oscar Salazar
- (Venezuela) Luis Sánchez
- (Puerto Rico) Orlando Sánchez
- (United States) Jack Sanford
- (Dominican Republic) Rafael Santana
- (Puerto Rico) Benito Santiago
- (Puerto Rico) José 'Pantalones' Santiago
- (Venezuela) Manny Sarmiento
- (United States) Steve Sax
- (Panama) Pat Scantlebury
- (United States) Hank Schenz
- (United States) Mike Schmidt
- (United States) Mike Scioscia
- (Venezuela) Marco Scutaro
- (United States) Jeff Sellers
- (United States) Wilmer Shantz
- (United States) Bob Shaw
- (United States) Don Shaw
- (United States) Razor Shines
- (Puerto Rico) Candy Sierra
- (Puerto Rico) Rubén Sierra
- (Curaçao) Randall Simon
- (United States) Wayne Simpson
- (United States) Bob Skinner
- (United States) Dave Smith
- (United States) Hal Smith
- (United States) Jerry Snyder
- (Dominican Republic) Julio Solano
- (Cuba) Alay Soler
- (Dominican Republic) Sammy Sosa
- (Dominican Republic) Mario Soto
- (United States) Cliff Speck
- (United States) Daryl Spencer
- (United States) Ed Spiezio
- (United States) Mike Stanton
- (United States) Dick Starr
- (United States) Jeff Stone
- (United States) Dave Stewart
- (United States) Mike Sweeney
- (Dominican Republic) José St. Claire

== T ==
- (United States) Dwight Taylor
- (Cuba) Tony Taylor
- (Dominican Republic) Miguel Tejada
- (United States) Johnny Temple
- (United States) Derrel Thomas
- (Puerto Rico) Valmy Thomas
- (Puerto Rico) Dickie Thon
- (United States) Bob Thurman
- (United States) Kevin Tolar
- (United States) Wayne Tolleson
- (Venezuela) Pablo Torrealba
- (Puerto Rico) Félix Torres
- (Dominican Republic) Salomón Torres
- (Venezuela) César Tovar
- (United States) Jim Tracy
- (United States) Ralph Treuel
- (Mexico) Alex Treviño
- (United States) Gus Triandos
- (Venezuela) Manny Trillo
- (United States) Quincy Trouppe
- (United States) Joe Tuminelli

== U ==
- (United States) Jim Umbricht
- (Dominican Republic) José Uribe

== V ==
- (Puerto Rico) José Valentín
- (Mexico) Fernando Valenzuela
- (Mexico) Sebastián Valle
- (Puerto Rico) Javier Vázquez
- (Puerto Rico) Jesús Vega
- (Venezuela) Guillermo Vento
- (Cuba) Zoilo Versalles
- (Venezuela) Omar Vizquel

== W ==
- (United States) Stan Wall
- (United States) Lee Walls
- (United States) Bill Werle
- (United States) Jerry White
- (United States) Hoyt Wilhelm
- (Puerto Rico) Bernie Williams
- (United States) Bump Wills
- (United States) Archie Wilson
- (United States) Bob Wilson
- (United States) Earl Wilson
- (United States) George Wilson
- (United States) Casey Wise
- (United States) Pete Wojey
- (United States) Clyde Wright
- (United States) Ed Wright

== Y ==
- (United States) Lenny Yochim
- (United States) Matt Young

== Z ==
- (Cuba) Adrián Zabala
- (United States) Chris Zachary
- (Venezuela) Mauro Zárate
- (United States) Don Zimmer

== Sources ==
- Antero Núñez, José. Series del Caribe. Impresos Urbina, Caracas, Venezuela.
- Araujo Bojórquez, Alfonso. Series del Caribe: Narraciones y estadísticas, 1949-2001. Colegio de Bachilleres del Estado de Sinaloa, Mexico.
- Figueredo, Jorge S. Cuban Baseball: A Statistical History, 1878 - 1961. Macfarland & Co., United States.
- González Echevarría, Roberto. The Pride of Havana. Oxford University Express.
- Gutiérrez, Daniel. Enciclopedia del Béisbol en Venezuela, Caracas, Venezuela.
