= 1950 Caribbean Series =

1950 baseball tournament

Tournament details
- Country: Puerto Rico
- City: San Juan
- Venue(s): 1 (in 1 host city)
- Dates: 21–27 February
- Teams: 4

Final positions
- Champions: (Panama) Carta Vieja Yankees (1st title)
- Runners-up: (Puerto Rico) Criollos de Caguas

Awards
- MVP: (United States) Joe Tuminelli

The second edition of the Caribbean Series (Serie del Caribe) was held from February 21 through February 27, in 1950. It featured the champion baseball teams of Cuba, Alacranes del Almendares; Panama, Carta Vieja Yankees; Puerto Rico, Criollos de Caguas, and Venezuela, Navegantes del Magallanes. The format consisted of 12 games, each team facing the other teams twice, and the games were played at Sixto Escobar Stadium in San Juan, Puerto Rico.

== Summary ==
The Series had to go more than the scheduled 12 games when both Panama and Puerto Rico teams ended with a similar 4-2 record. Panama clinched the title after beating Puerto Rico in a tiebreaker game. The Panamanian team, who entered the series as underdog, was led by manager/outfielder Wayne Blackburn, pitcher Chet Brewer (2-0), and third baseman Joe Tuminelli, who hit two home runs with seven runs batted in as he received Series MVP honors. The champion team also counted with pitchers John Fitzgerald, Tony Jacobs, Jean-Pierre Roy and Pat Scantlebury; catchers Roy Easterwood and Stan Andrews; second baseman Spook Jacobs, and outfielder Ted Cieslak.

Puerto Rico was led by manager/outfielder Luis Rodríguez Olmo, who hit .292, and pitcher Luis Arroyo (2-0), who posted a 1.72 ERA and allowed eight hits in 15 2/3 innings. Other significant players in the roster included outfielder Willard Brown (.348), pitchers Wilmer Fields (1-0, one HR) and Rubén Gómez, and first baseman Vic Power.

Even with the Cubans heavily favored to win the Series, they only went 3-3. The team was managed by catcher Fermín Guerra, and included Andrés Fleitas, Al Gionfriddo, Conrado Marrero, Willy Miranda, René Monteagudo and Roberto Ortiz. Slugger Héctor Rodríguez led the hitters with a .474 batting average (9-for-19), while pitcher Bob Hooper ended 2-0.

The hapless Venezuelan team was managed by outfielder Vidal López and finished with a 1-5 record, being outscored 14-22, while losing by one run in three of their five defeats. López paced the offense with a team-high four RBIs, leading also the Series in doubles (4) and tying Guerra and Monteagudo for 4th in RBIs. The roster included Alex Carrasquel, Chico Carrasquel, Pete Coscarart, Terris McDuffie, Bob Griffith, Jim Pendleton and Chucho Ramos, while the team's only victory came behind a strong pitching effort from starter Santiago Ullrich in the opener.

== Participating teams ==
| Team | Manager |
|---|---|
| (Cuba) Alacranes del Almendares | (Cuba) Fermín Guerra |
| (Panama) Carta Vieja Yankees | (United States) Wayne Blackburn |
| (Puerto Rico) Criollos de Caguas | (Puerto Rico) Luis Olmo |
| (Venezuela) Navegantes del Magallanes | (Venezuela) Vidal López |

== Final standings ==
| Pos | Team | Pld | W | L | RF | RA | RD | PCT | GB |
|---|---|---|---|---|---|---|---|---|---|
| 1 | (Panama) Carta Vieja Yankees | 7 | 5 | 2 | 33 | 28 | +5 | .714 | — |
| 2 | (Puerto Rico) Criollos de Caguas (H) | 7 | 4 | 3 | 19 | 22 | −3 | .571 | 1 |
| 3 | (Cuba) Alacranes del Almendares | 6 | 3 | 3 | 28 | 22 | +6 | .500 | 1.5 |
| 4 | (Venezuela) Navegantes del Magallanes | 6 | 1 | 5 | 14 | 22 | −8 | .167 | 3.5 |

Source: CBPC
(H) Hosts

=== Scoreboards ===
==== Game 1, February 21 ====
| Team | 1 | 2 | 3 | 4 | 5 | 6 | 7 | 8 | 9 | R | H | E |
|---|---|---|---|---|---|---|---|---|---|---|---|---|
| Panama | 0 | 0 | 0 | 0 | 0 | 0 | 0 | 1 | 1 | 2 | 7 | 0 |
| Venezuela | 0 | 1 | 0 | 1 | 0 | 0 | 0 | 1 | x | 3 | 11 | 1 |
WP: Santiago Ullrich (1-0) LP: Pat Scantlebury (0-1); Home runs: PAN: Joe Tuminelli (1); VEN: None

==== Game 2, February 21 ====
| Team | 1 | 2 | 3 | 4 | 5 | 6 | 7 | 8 | 9 | R | H | E |
|---|---|---|---|---|---|---|---|---|---|---|---|---|
| Cuba | 0 | 0 | 0 | 0 | 0 | 0 | 0 | 0 | 0 | 0 | 5 | 1 |
| Puerto Rico | 0 | 1 | 0 | 0 | 0 | 0 | 0 | 0 | 0 | 1 | 5 | 0 |
WP: Dan Bankhead (1-0) LP: Conrado Marrero (0-1)

==== Game 3, February 22 ====
| Team | 1 | 2 | 3 | 4 | 5 | 6 | 7 | 8 | 9 | R | H | E |
|---|---|---|---|---|---|---|---|---|---|---|---|---|
| Venezuela | 0 | 0 | 1 | 0 | 0 | 0 | 0 | 0 | 0 | 1 | 5 | 0 |
| Cuba | 0 | 0 | 0 | 1 | 0 | 0 | 0 | 1 | x | 2 | 5 | 3 |
WP: Bob Hooper (1-0) LP: Mel Himes (0-1)

==== Game 4, February 22 ====
| Team | 1 | 2 | 3 | 4 | 5 | 6 | 7 | 8 | 9 | R | H | E |
|---|---|---|---|---|---|---|---|---|---|---|---|---|
| Puerto Rico | 0 | 0 | 0 | 1 | 0 | 0 | 2 | 0 | 0 | 3 | 8 | 3 |
| Panama | 0 | 2 | 0 | 0 | 0 | 2 | 0 | 0 | x | 4 | 8 | 1 |
WP: Jean-Pierre Roy (1-0) LP: Cecil Kaiser (0-1)

==== Game 5, February 23 ====
| Team | 1 | 2 | 3 | 4 | 5 | 6 | 7 | 8 | 9 | R | H | E |
|---|---|---|---|---|---|---|---|---|---|---|---|---|
| Cuba | 0 | 1 | 0 | 1 | 0 | 0 | 5 | 1 | 0 | 8 | 7 | 4 |
| Panama | 0 | 1 | 0 | 1 | 3 | 0 | 2 | 0 | 2 | 9 | 11 | 2 |
WP: Chet Brewer (1-0) LP: Conrado Marrero (0-2); Home runs: CUB: None; PAN: Joe Tuminelli (2)

==== Game 6, February 23 ====
| Team | 1 | 2 | 3 | 4 | 5 | 6 | 7 | 8 | 9 | R | H | E |
|---|---|---|---|---|---|---|---|---|---|---|---|---|
| Venezuela | 0 | 0 | 0 | 0 | 0 | 0 | 0 | 1 | 0 | 1 | 4 | 3 |
| Puerto Rico | 0 | 0 | 0 | 0 | 0 | 0 | 0 | 0 | 2 | 2 | 6 | 1 |
WP: Luis Arroyo (1-0) LP: Terris McDuffie (0-1); Home runs: VEN: Luis García (1); PUR: Wilmer Fields (1)

==== Game 7, February 24 ====
| Team | 1 | 2 | 3 | 4 | 5 | 6 | 7 | 8 | 9 | R | H | E |
|---|---|---|---|---|---|---|---|---|---|---|---|---|
| Venezuela | 0 | 0 | 0 | 0 | 1 | 0 | 1 | | 0 | 2 | 7 | 2 |
| Panama | 0 | 2 | 0 | 1 | 0 | 1 | 0 | 0 | x | 4 | 6 | 1 |
WP: Dick Burgett (1-1) LP: Alex Carrasquel (0-1)

==== Game 8, February 24 ====
| Team | 1 | 2 | 3 | 4 | 5 | 6 | 7 | 8 | 9 | R | H | E |
|---|---|---|---|---|---|---|---|---|---|---|---|---|
| Puerto Rico | 0 | 0 | 1 | 3 | 0 | 0 | 0 | 0 | 2 | 6 | 12 | 0 |
| Cuba | 0 | 0 | 0 | 1 | 0 | 0 | 0 | 0 | 0 | 1 | 5 | 4 |
WP: Wilmer Fields (1-0) LP: Octavio Rubert (0-1); Home runs: PUR: None; CUB: Héctor Rodríguez (1)

==== Game 9, February 25 ====
| Team | 1 | 2 | 3 | 4 | 5 | 6 | 7 | 8 | 9 | R | H | E |
|---|---|---|---|---|---|---|---|---|---|---|---|---|
| Cuba | 0 | 3 | 0 | 0 | 2 | 0 | 1 | 1 | 2 | 9 | 9 | 4 |
| Venezuela | 1 | 1 | 0 | 0 | 0 | 3 | 0 | 0 | 0 | 5 | 8 | 1 |
WP: Vicente López (1-0) LP: Bob Griffith (0-1); Home runs: CUB: Roberto Ortiz (1); VEN: None

==== Game 10, February 25 ====
| Team | 1 | 2 | 3 | 4 | 5 | 6 | 7 | 8 | 9 | R | H | E |
|---|---|---|---|---|---|---|---|---|---|---|---|---|
| Panama | 1 | 0 | 0 | 2 | 0 | 1 | 1 | 0 | 0 | 5 | 8 | 0 |
| Puerto Rico | 0 | 1 | 0 | 0 | 0 | 0 | 0 | 0 | 0 | 1 | 6 | 2 |
WP: Forrest Jacobs (1-0) LP: Dan Bankhead (1-1)

==== Game 11, February 26 ====
| Team | 1 | 2 | 3 | 4 | 5 | 6 | 7 | 8 | 9 | R | H | E |
|---|---|---|---|---|---|---|---|---|---|---|---|---|
| Panama | 0 | 0 | 0 | 0 | 0 | 0 | 0 | 0 | 0 | 0 | 4 | 3 |
| Cuba | 0 | 1 | 0 | 0 | 0 | 7 | 0 | 0 | x | 8 | 7 | 3 |
WP: Bob Hooper (2-0) LP: Jean-Pierre Roy (1-1); Home runs: PAN: None; CUB: Fermín Guerra (1)

==== Game 12, February 26 ====
| Team | 1 | 2 | 3 | 4 | 5 | 6 | 7 | 8 | 9 | R | H | E |
|---|---|---|---|---|---|---|---|---|---|---|---|---|
| Puerto Rico | 0 | 0 | 2 | 1 | 0 | 0 | 0 | 0 | 0 | 3 | 6 | 0 |
| Venezuela | 0 | 0 | 0 | 0 | 0 | 0 | 2 | 0 | 0 | 2 | 6 | 3 |
WP: Luis Arroyo (2-0) LP: Terris McDuffie (0-2); Home runs: PUR: None; VEN: Gene Markland (1)

==== Tiebreaker Game, February 27 ====
| Team | 1 | 2 | 3 | 4 | 5 | 6 | 7 | 8 | 9 | R | H | E |
|---|---|---|---|---|---|---|---|---|---|---|---|---|
| Panama | 0 | 0 | 6 | 0 | 2 | 0 | 1 | 0 | 0 | 9 | 10 | 1 |
| Puerto Rico | 0 | 0 | 2 | 0 | 0 | 0 | 1 | 0 | 0 | 3 | 7 | 0 |
WP: Chet Brewer (2-0) LP: Dan Bankhead (1-2)

== Statistics leaders ==
| Statistic | Player | Team | Total |
|---|---|---|---|
| Batting average | (Cuba) Héctor Rodríguez | (Cuba) Alacranes del Almendares | .474 |
| Home runs | (United States) Joe Tuminelli | (Panama) Carta Vieja Yankees | 2 |
| Runs batted in | (United States) Joe Tuminelli | (Panama) Carta Vieja Yankees | 6 |
| Wins | (Puerto Rico) Luis Arroyo | (Puerto Rico) Criollos de Caguas | 3 |
| Wins | (United States) Chet Brewer | (Panama) Carta Vieja Yankees | 3 |
| Wins | (Canada) Bob Hooper | (Cuba) Alacranes del Almendares | 3 |

== Awards ==
Tournament Awards
| Award | Player | Team |
|---|---|---|
| MVP | (United States) Joe Tuminelli | (Panama) Carta Vieja Yankees |
| Best manager | (United States) Wayne Blackburn | (Panama) Carta Vieja Yankees |

All Star Team
| Position | Player | Team |
|---|---|---|
| First base | (Cuba) Andrés Fleitas | (Cuba) Alacranes del Almendares |
| Second base | (United States) Spook Jacobs | (Panama) Carta Vieja Yankees |
| Third base | (Cuba) Héctor Rodríguez | (Cuba) Alacranes del Almendares |
| Shortstop | (Venezuela) Alfonso Carrasquel | (Venezuela) Navegantes del Magallanes |
| Left field | (Puerto Rico) Luis Olmo | (Puerto Rico) Criollos de Caguas |
| Center field | (United States) Dick Burgett | (Panama) Carta Vieja Yankees |
| Right field | (Cuba) Roberto Ortiz | (Cuba) Alacranes del Almendares |
| Catcher | (Cuba) Fermín Guerra | (Cuba) Alacranes del Almendares |
| Pitcher | (Canada) Bob Hooper | (Cuba) Alacranes del Almendares |

== See also ==
- List of baseball players who have played in the Caribbean Series

== Sources ==
- Antero Núñez, José. Series del Caribe. Jefferson, Caracas, Venezuela: Impresos Urbina, C.A., 1987.
- Gutiérrez, Daniel. Enciclopedia del Béisbol en Venezuela – 1895-2006 . Caracas, Venezuela: Impresión Arte, C.A., 2007.
