= 1952 Caribbean Series =

1952 baseball tournament

Tournament details
- Country: Panama
- City: Panama City
- Venue(s): 1 (in 1 host city)
- Dates: 20–26 February
- Teams: 4

Final positions
- Champions: (Cuba) Leones del Habana (1st title)
- Runners-up: (Panama) Carta Vieja Yankees

Awards
- MVP: (United States) Tommy Fine

The fourth edition of the Caribbean Series (Serie del Caribe) was played in 1952. It was held from February 20 through February 26, featuring the champion baseball teams of Cuba, Leones del Habana; Panama, Carta Vieja Yankees; Puerto Rico, Senadores de San Juan and Venezuela, Cervecería Caracas. The format consisted of 12 games, each team facing the other teams twice, and the games were played at Panama City. The first pitch was thrown by Alcibíades Arosemena, by then the President of Panama.

== Summary ==
Cuba became the first country to win two Caribbean Series championships with an undefeated record of 5–0. The Cuban team, with manager/catcher Mike González at the helm, won the Series behind a strong pitching effort by Tommy Fine, who posted a 2–0 record with a 1.50 ERA in two complete-games and won Most Valuable Player honors. After a 3–3 tie against Puerto Rico in the Series opener, he was called by the Cuban team as a late replacement for future Hall of Famer Hoyt Wilhelm. Fine posted the first no-hitter pitched in any Caribbean series game, to give his team a 1–0 win against Venezuela. Five days later, Fine faced Panama's club and was close to glory. He was three outs from consecutive no-hitters in the series, having allowed a single in the ninth inning to break it up. His 17 hitless streak also is the longest in series history. Outfielder Sandy Amorós led series hitters with a .450 batting average (9-for-20), including personal numbers with a .650 SLG, six runs, six RBI. Other contributions came from OF Fernando Pedroso (.400), catcher Andrés Fleitas (.304), and infielders Lou Klein (.333) and Spider Jorgensen, who hit two of the team's three home runs.

The clubs from Panama and Venezuela tied for second place with a 3–3 record. Panama was managed by Al Leap and included in the roster infielders Spook Jacobs, Joe Tuminelli and Jim Cronin, catcher León Kellman, and pitchers Connie Johnson and Marion Fricano.

The Venezuelan club, led by José Antonio Casanova, featured players as right fielder Wilmer Fields (.360, two HR, .720 SLG, 8 RBI), shortstop Chico Carrasquel and third baseman Luis García, as well as catcher/outfielder Guillermo Vento and pitchers José Bracho, Emilio Cueche, Bob Griffith, Johnny Hetki, Al Papai and Luis Zuloaga. In addition, center fielder Héctor Benítez and third baseman Buddy Hicks joined Fields in the All-Star team.

After a tied game with Cuba, Puerto Rico's team failed to win in their next five games. Managed by Fred Thon, their roster included outfielders Nino Escalera and Luis Rodríguez Olmo; pitchers Red Adams, Luis Arroyo, Art Ditmar and Pantalones Santiago, and OF/P Cot Deal.

== Participating teams ==
Team	Manager
(Panama) Carta Vieja Yankees	(United States) Al Leap
(Venezuela) Cervecería Caracas	(Venezuela) José Antonio Casanova
(Cuba) Leones del Habana	(Cuba) Mike González
(Puerto Rico) Senadores de San Juan	(Puerto Rico) Freddie Thon

== Final standings ==
Pos	Team	Pld	W	D	L	RF	RA	RD	PCT	GB
1	(Cuba) Leones del Habana	6	5	1	0	29	11	+18	.917	—
2	(Panama) Carta Vieja Yankees (H)	6	3	0	3	20	21	−1	.500	2.5
3	(Venezuela) Cervecería Caracas	6	3	0	3	13	18	−5	.500	2.5
4	(Puerto Rico) Senadores de San Juan	6	0	1	5	13	25	−12	.083	5

Source: CBPC
(H) Hosts

=== Scoreboards ===
==== Game 1, February 20 ====
Team	1	2	3	4	5	6	7	8	9	R	H	E
Cuba	0	0	1	0	0	3	0	6	0	3	5	1
Puerto Rico	0	0	0	0	1	0	2	0	0	3	7	2
WP: None LP: TBD; Home runs: CUB: Spider Jorgensen (1); PUR: Cot Deal (1)

==== Game 2, February 20 ====
Team	1	2	3	4	5	6	7	8	9	10	11	R	H	E
Venezuela	0	0	0	0	0	0	1	0	0	0	1	2	10	1
Panama	0	0	0	0	1	0	0	0	0	0	0	1	6	2
WP: Johnny Hetki (1-0) LP: Dave Thomas (0-1); Home runs: VEN: None; PAN: Jim Cronin (1)

==== Game 3, February 21 ====
Team	1	2	3	4	5	6	7	8	9	R	H	E
Venezuela	0	0	0	0	0	0	0	0	0	0	0	0
Cuba	0	0	0	0	0	1	0	0	x	1	4	2
WP: Tommy Fine (1-0) LP: Al Papai (0-1); Notes: Fine posted the first no-hitter pitched in Series history, striking out four while walking three.

==== Game 4, February 21 ====
Team	1	2	3	4	5	6	7	8	9	R	H	E
Panama	0	2	1	0	0	1	0	2	0	6	9	2
Puerto Rico	0	0	1	0	0	0	0	0	0	1	6	2
WP: Hisel Patrick (1-0) LP: Red Adams (0-1); Home runs: PAN: Dale Lynch (1); PUR: None

==== Game 5, February 22 ====
Team	1	2	3	4	5	6	7	8	9	10	11	R	H	E
Venezuela	0	0	0	0	2	0	1	0	0	0	1	3	8	2
Puerto Rico	0	0	0	0	2	0	0	0	0	0	0	2	8	1
WP: José Bracho (1-0) LP: Cot Deal (0-1) Sv: Emilio Cueche (1); Notes: Bracho hurled 10 innings and went 2-for-2 with two walks.

==== Game 6, February 22 ====
Team	1	2	3	4	5	6	7	8	9	R	H	E
Panama	2	0	0	0	0	0	0	0	0	2	8	3
Cuba	0	0	1	0	0	0	0	3	x	4	5	1
WP: Rogelio Martínez (1-0) LP: Marion Fricano (0-1); Home runs: PAN: None; CUB: Spider Jorgensen (2)

==== Game 7, February 23 ====
Team	1	2	3	4	5	6	7	8	9	R	H	E
Puerto Rico	0	0	0	0	2	0	0	0	0	2	4	2
Cuba	0	1	0	0	0	0	0	0	2	3	7	0
WP: Jackie Collum (1-0) LP: Roberto Vargas (0-1); Home runs: PUR: Luis Rodríguez Olmo (1); CUB: Lou Klein (1)

==== Game 8, February 23 ====
Team	1	2	3	4	5	6	7	8	9	R	H	E
Panama	0	0	0	0	4	0	0	0	0	4	8	0
Venezuela	0	0	0	0	0	0	0	0	1	1	8	1
WP: Alberto Osorio (1-0) LP: Bill Samson (0-1); Home runs: PAN: Ed Knoublach (1); VEN: None

==== Game 9, February 24 ====
Team	1	2	3	4	5	6	7	8	9	R	H	E
Cuba	1	0	0	0	0	1	0	0	5	7	8	1
Venezuela	0	0	0	0	0	1	0	0	0	1	5	4
WP: Bill Ayers (1-0) LP: Johnny Hetki (1-1); Home runs: CUB: None; VEN: Wilmer Fields (1)

==== Game 10, February 25 ====
Team	1	2	3	4	5	6	7	8	9	R	H	E
Puerto Rico	0	0	0	0	2	0	0	0	0	2	9	1
Panama	0	0	0	4	0	0	0	0	x	4	9	0
WP: Andrés Alonso (1-0) LP: José Santiago (0-1)

==== Game 11, February 26 ====
Team	1	2	3	4	5	6	7	8	9	R	H	E
Puerto Rico	0	0	0	0	0	0	0	0	3	3	7	1
Venerzuela	2	0	0	0	0	2	0	2	x	6	11	2
WP: Al Papai (1-1) LP: Red Adams (0-2); Home runs: PUR: None; VEN: Wilmer Fields (2), Mo Mozzali (1)

==== Game 12, February 26 ====
Team	1	2	3	4	5	6	7	8	9	R	H	E
Cuba	2	0	0	0	0	0	3	3	3	11	16	0
Panama	0	0	0	0	0	0	0	0	3	3	3	2
WP: Tommy Fine (2-0) LP: Hisel Patrick (0-1); Notes: Fine had a no-hitter through eight innings, setting a Series record with 17 consecutive hitless innings pitched.

== Statistics leaders ==
Statistic	Player	Team	Total
Batting average	(Cuba) Sandy Amorós	(Cuba) Leones del Habana	.450
Home runs	(United States) Wilmer Fields	(Venezuela) Cervecería Caracas	2
Home runs	(United States) Spider Jorgensen	(Cuba) Leones del Habana	2
Runs batted in	(United States) Wilmer Fields	(Venezuela) Cervecería Caracas	7
Runs	(Canada) Stan Breard	(Puerto Rico) Senadores de San Juan	8
Hits	(Cuba) Sandy Amorós	(Cuba) Leones del Habana	9
Hits	(United States) Wilmer Fields	(Venezuela) Cervecería Caracas	9
Hits	(United States) Spook Jacobs	(Panama) Carta Vieja Yankees	9
Doubles	(Cuba) Sandy Amorós	(Cuba) Leones del Habana	4
Triples	(United States) John Kropf	(Panama) Carta Vieja Yankees	1
Triples	(Panama) Alberto Osorio	(Panama) Carta Vieja Yankees	1
Stolen bases	(United States) Jerry Lynch	(Panama) Carta Vieja Yankees	2
Wins	(United States) Tommy Fine	(Cuba) Leones del Habana	2
Earned run average	(United States) Tommy Fine	(Cuba) Leones del Habana	0.00
Complete games	(United States) Tommy Fine	(Cuba) Leones del Habana	2
Complete games	(United States) Johnny Hetki	(Venezuela) Cervecería Caracas	2
Strikeouts	(United States) Johnny Hetki	(Venezuela) Cervecería Caracas	9
Walks	(United States) Cot Deal	(Puerto Rico) Senadores de San Juan	9

== Awards ==
Tournament Awards
Award	Player	Team
MVP	(United States) Tommy Fine	(Cuba) Leones del Habana
Best manager	(Cuba) Mike González	(Cuba) Leones del Habana

All Star Team
Position	Player	Team
First base	(United States) Eddie Neville	(Panama) Carta Vieja Yankees
Second base	(United States) Spook Jacobs	(Panama) Carta Vieja Yankees
Third base	(United States) Buddy Hicks	(Venezuela) Cervecería Caracas
Shortstop	(United States) Lou Klein	(Cuba) Leones del Habana
Left field	(Cuba) Sandy Amorós	(Cuba) Leones del Habana
Center field	(Venezuela) Héctor Benítez	(Venezuela) Cervecería Caracas
Right field	(United States) Wilmer Fields	(Venezuela) Cervecería Caracas
Catcher	(Cuba) Andrés Fleitas	(Cuba) Leones del Habana
Pitcher	(United States) Tommy Fine	(Cuba) Leones del Habana

== See also ==
- Latin American Series (1952)
- Ballplayers who have played in the Series

== Sources ==
- Antero Núñez, José. Series del Caribe. Jefferson, Caracas, Venezuela: Impresos Urbina, C.A., 1987.
- Gutiérrez, Daniel. Enciclopedia del Béisbol en Venezuela – 1895-2006 . Caracas, Venezuela: Impresión Arte, C.A., 2007.
