= Carta Vieja Yankees =

Defunct Panamanian baseball club

Information
- League: Panamanian League
- League championships: 5 (1949–50, 1951–52, 1953–54, 1954–55, 1957–58)
- Former name(s): Licoreros de Carta Vieja

The Carta Vieja Yankees (Spanish: Yanquis de Carta Vieja), also known as the Licoreros de Carta Vieja (English: Carta Vieja Distillers), were a professional baseball team active in the Panamanian Professional Baseball League in the late 1940s and 1950s. The team's name originated with its sponsor, Carta Vieja Rum; the nickname also reflected the team's success in the Panamanian league and the fact that many of its players were American, hence the comparison to the New York Yankees of Major League Baseball.

Carta Vieja won its first league title in the 1949–50 winter league season, finishing with a 30–15 record to best the runner-up Chesterfield Smokers by seven games. The team was composed largely of American players from organized baseball, with the exception of Panamanians Pat Scantlebury, Frankie Austin, and Vibert Clarke. It went on to win the 1950 Caribbean Series in San Juan, Puerto Rico, the first international title for a Panamanian club. Carta Vieja returned to the Caribbean Series in 1952 and 1958. However, the team folded before the 1959–60 season, replaced by the Comercios Dodgers franchise.

The name was resurrected in 2001 as the Roneros de Carta Vieja (English: Carta Vieja Rum Distillers), this time representing the provinces of Chiriquí and Bocas del Toro Province; this team, managed by Héctor López, won the 2001–02 season.

== Notable players ==
- (United States) Joe Tuminelli
- (United States) Roy Easterwood
- (United States) Stan Andrews
- (United States) Tony Jacobs
- (United States) Spook Jacobs
- (Panama) Pat Scantlebury
- (Panama) Webbo Clarke
- (Panama) Frankie Austin
- (United States) Jim Brewer
- (Canada) Jean-Pierre Roy
- (United States) Wayne Blackburn (mgr.)
- (United States) Chet Brewer
- (United States) Jim Cronin
- (United States) Jerry Davie
- (United States) Carl Duser
- (United States) Marion Fricano
- (United States) Milt Graff
- (United States) Bill Harris
- (United States) Connie Johnson
- (United States) Spider Jorgensen
- (Panama) Héctor López (mgr.)
- (Panama) Bobby Prescott
- (Panama) Humberto Robinson
- (United States) Billy Shantz
- (United States) Jim Umbricht
- (Panama) León Kellman
