= Wilmer Fields =

American baseball player (1922–2004)

- Pitcher / Outfielder / Third baseman
- Born: August 2, 1922; Manassas, Virginia, US
- Died: June 4, 2004 (aged 81); Manassas, Virginia, US
- Batted: Right Threw: Right

debut
- 1940, for the Homestead Grays

Last appearance
- 1958, for the Diablos Rojos del México
- Stats at Baseball Reference

Teams
- Homestead Grays (1940–1942; 1946–1950); Indios de Mayagüez (1947–'48–1950–'51); Brantford Red Sox (1951; 1953–1955); Cervecería Caracas (1950–'51–1951–'52); Toronto Maple Leafs (1952); Patriotas de Venezuela (1952–'53); Estrellas de Oriente (1953–'54); Fort Wayne Allen Dairymen (1956–1957); Sultanes de Monterrey (1958); Diablos Rojos del México (1958)

Career highlights and awards
- Negro World Series championship (1948); NBL East-West All-Star (1948); 3× Intercounty Baseball League MVP Award (1951; 1954–1955); Puerto Rico Baseball League MVP Award (1948–1949); Venezuela Baseball League MVP Award (1951–1952); National Baseball Congress MVP Award (1956); Colombian League MVP Award (1954–1955); Caribbean Series All-Star team (1950); Hit the first grand slam in Caribbean Series history (1949)

Member of the Caribbean

Baseball Hall of Fame
- Induction: 2001
Medals
Representing United States
Global World Series
Gold medal – first place	1956 Milwaukee	Team

Wilmer Leon Fields (August 2, 1922 – June 4, 2004) was an American professional baseball player who was a household name in the Negro leagues and other baseball circuits between the 1940s and 1950s.

Born in Manassas, Virginia, Fields was a versatile two-way player in the Negro leagues, and also played in Canada and several Latin American leagues, including Mexico, Puerto Rico, Venezuela, Cuba, Panama, Colombia, and the Dominican Republic. In most leagues, he was a pitcher but played at third base or outfield in games when he was not scheduled to pitch. His consistent batting and pitching skills helped him capture the Most Valuable Player award on many occasions throughout the course of his distinguished career.

Fields possessed a running fastball complemented by a curve, a slider and eventually a knuckler, and he had average control of his pitches. He was often referred to as ″Red″, ″Bill″, or ″Chinky″.

== Professional career ==
=== Negro leagues ===
At 6-foot 3-inches (1.92 m) and 220 pounds (100 kg), Fields played quarterback at Virginia State University in Petersburg, but left school when he was recruited to play for the Homestead Grays Negro League club in 1939. He spent his entire Negro League career with the Grays but continued his college education in the off-seasons while also playing football and basketball.

The Grays were one of the finest teams in the Negro League, winning nine league championships before folding in the wake of desegregated professional baseball. They played many of their home games at the old Griffith Stadium in Washington, D.C. and some in Homestead, a neighborhood of Pittsburgh. After Jackie Robinson joined the Brooklyn Dodgers in the 1947 season and broke the color line in Major League Baseball, the Negro leagues struggled, starting to die off.

In 1940 Fields joined the Grays at the age of 17, showing records of 2–1, 13-5 and 15–3 in his first three seasons, but his promising career was interrupted —but hardly harmed— by Army service in Europe during World War II. Following his discharge in 1946, Fields posted a record of 72–17 record over the next five seasons, compiling a stunning record of 102 wins and 26 losses during his eight years in the league, helping his team clinch four pennant titles (1940–1942; 1948) and a World Series championship (1948).

In 1948 he was selected for the East-West All-Star Game, which was played at Yankee Stadium. Later that same year, Fields led Homestead to defeat the Baltimore Elite Giants 3–0 in the 1948 Negro National League Championship. The Grays then defeated the Birmingham Black Barons, 4–1, to win the 1948 Negro World Series, during what turned out to be the last Series ever played in Negro league history.

After that, he became part of several championship teams and was selected as Most Valuable Player a record seven times in different baseball leagues.

=== Canadian baseball ===
Once the Grays disbanded, Fields received numerous contract offers from major league organizations, but he was content with what he was doing and refused them. Then, he opted to play in Canadian baseball during the summer and also in the Caribbean winter leagues. As a result, he travelled to Canada to play for the Brantford Red Sox of the competitive Intercounty Baseball League in southwestern Ontario.

Fields played for Brantford in 1951 and from 1953 through 1955, as well as for the Toronto Maple Leafs of the International League in 1952.

While playing for Brantford, he posted pitching records of 11–2, 10–2, 9-3 and 8–0, and batting averages of .382, 381, .379 and .425, respectively, to win three MVP awards in the league during the 1951, 1954 and 1955 seasons. in four campaigns there, he compiled a 38–7 record and a .392 average.

In his only season for Toronto, he hit a second best team average of .291 in 52 games while sharing duties with eight outfielders.

=== National Baseball Congress ===
Besides his stay in Canada, Fields played from 1956 to 1957 with the Fort Wayne Allen Dairymen team based in Indiana. The team was a member of the Michigan-Indiana League, a top notch top semipro league composed of black and white players, which had been integrated by legendary Double Duty Radcliffe in 1948.

Between the 1940s and 1950s, Fort Wayne was a strong ballclub that participated in several Global World Series organized by the National Baseball Congress.

Starting in 1935, participated in the event championship teams from four continents. Usually, the U.S. teams had Negro League players, minor leaguers and former big leaguers in their rosters. The Fort Wayne team won four NBC championship titles from 1947 through 1950 and a fifth title in 1956.

In the two seasons, Fields had records of 6-1 and 5–0 on the mound, with batting averages of .432 and .387. He earned MVP honors in the 1956 NBC tournament, putting his name alongside greats such as Satchel Paige (1935), Red Barkley (1941), George Archie (1943), Cot Deal (1944–1945), Bill Ricks (1949), Pat Scantlebury (1950), Daryl Spencer (1955) and Clyde McCullough (1955).

=== Puerto Rico Baseball League ===
Likewise, Fields represented a good example of a ballplayer who benefited from the opportunities created by the interdependence of Latino and black baseball. Fields recalled the passion and intensity of competition in Caribbean baseball in his autobiography My Life in the Negro Leagues: «Not everyone could make it down there and you better believe if you didn't produce you didn't last long. I was lucky that way».

In addition to eight Negro league campaigns and several minor league stints after integration, Fields also played four seasons in the Puerto Rico Baseball League for the Indios de Mayagüez. He looked forward to supplement his income during the winter by doing what he loved most.

In 1947–1948 he had a chance to show his stuff as a pitcher/outfielder for Mayagüez, ending with a 5–5 mark, while batting .315 with five home runs and 41 runs batted in. Then, he posted a 10-4 pitching record and hit .330 with 11 homers in the 1948–1949 season, topping the league with 88 RBIs and winning MVP Award honors, to lead his team to the 1949 Caribbean Series. Fields hit .429 as the Indios' third baseman in the Series, including two doubles, a homer and seven RBIs. He also went into the record books by hitting the first grand slam in Series history.

In 1949–1950 Fields had an 8–4 record and batted .326 for Mayagüez. He later was included as reinforcement of the Criollos de Caguas in the 1950 Caribbean Series.

Notably, Fields got one start in the event and defeated the highly favored Alacranes de Almendares of Cuba, 6–1, limiting them to five hits in a complete game effort. The only Cuban run came from a home run by Héctor Rodríguez. It was the second heroic effort for Fields in many games. In the previous game, facing the Navegantes del Magallanes of Venezuela, Fields belted a pinch-hit, bottom of the ninth, two-run homer against Terris McDuffie, to lift the Criollos to a 2–1 victory. It was the first walk-off hit of the Series, and rewarded a stellar four-hit by Luis Arroyo, who became the first pitcher born in Puerto Rico to win a Caribbean Series game.

Besides, Fields played the rest of the games as a backup outfielder for Willard Brown, Luis Olmo and Tetelo Vargas, going 3-for-11 with one home run, and scoring eight runs to tie Cuban Al Gionfriddo for the Series lead.

He then finished with a .323 average and a 5–2 record for Mayagüez in part of the 1950–1951 season.

=== Venezuela Baseball League ===
After that, Fields spent time in the Venezuelan Professional Baseball League while playing for the Cervecería Caracas and Patriotas de Venezuela clubs in a span of three seasons.

Fields reported to the Caracas club in the 1950–1951 midseason. As an outfielder for Cervecería, he batted .389 with three home runs and 13 RBIs in 28 games. He became the first player in league history to hit two grand slams in a single season, a feat only matched by Billy Queen in the 1953–1954 tournament and Pete Koegel in 1973–1974.

In 1951–1952, playing full-time, Fields carried Cervecería to the pennant title en route to the 1952 Caribbean Series, winning the league's batting crown with a .357 average, while also leading in hits (74), RBIs (45), runs scored (48), and doubles (21). He also finished second in home runs (8), one behind Patriotas' Russell Kerns, and added another MVP award to his trophy case.

He continued his torrid pace in the Series, batting .360 and leading in RBIs (7), while tying in home runs (2) with Cuban Spider Jorgensen and for the most hits (9) with Cuban Sandy Amorós and Panamanian Spook Jacobs. In addition, he collected the second-highest batting average behind Amorós (.450), and was named to the All-Star team as a right fielder.

Fields then played briefly for the Patriotas in 1951–1952, appearing in just 17 games and batting .258 with 10 RBIs.

=== Other leagues ===
In 1953–1954, Fields enjoyed another good season as an outfielder/pitcher for the Estrellas de Oriente of the Dominican Professional Baseball League. He had a very solid average of .393, while sporting a 5–2 record from the pitching circle.

Fields later played in Colombian baseball during the 1954–1955 and 1955–1956 seasons, batting averages of .330 and .319 respectively, and was honored with an MVP Award in his first season.

He also had brief stints in Cuba and Panama during the same decade, before playing his last season in the Mexican League in 1958. He divided his playing time between the Diablos Rojos del México and the Sultanes de Monterrey, playing at third base and some in the outfield, while batting .375 with seven home runs and 35 RBIs in 25 games.

== After baseball ==
Fields left baseball in 1958 and initially took a job as a bricklayer's helper. Disappointed by the low pay, he found more promising work as an alcohol counselor with the District government. His work took him to reform schools and prisons. At the Lorton Correctional Complex, he organized baseball games between inmates and young Prince William County players. The athletic genes were passed to his son, who attended Providence College on a full basketball scholarship.

He retired in the mid-1980s, worked briefly as a security guard and then became part of the new Negro League Baseball Players Association, which helped raise money for income-strapped former members and bring attention to the long-defunct league. As president of the association since the mid-1990s, he organized autograph shows and held benefit auctions to raise money for many of his former baseball colleagues, and also organized baseball games for prison inmates while working as an alcohol counselor.

Wilmer Fields died of a heart ailment at his home in Manassas, Virginia. He was 81.

== Honors and acknowledgments ==
In addition to his many awards during his playing days, Fields has received posthumous acknowledgment for his contribution to baseball.

In 2001 Fields received the honor of induction into the Caribbean Baseball Hall of Fame as part of their fifth class.

Then, in 2006 he was inducted into the Black Ice Hockey and Sports Hall of Fame along with 19 other Black athletes for his outstanding career in the Negro leagues.
