= Vidal López =

Venezuelan baseball player & manager (1918–1971)

- Outfielder / Pitcher / Manager
- Born: April 19, 1918; Río Chico, Miranda, Venezuela
- Died: February 20, 1971 (aged 52); Caracas, Venezuela
- Batted: Right Threw: Right

Teams
- Cangrejeros de Santurce (Puerto Rico baseball league); Elefantes de Cienfuegos (Cuba baseball league); Navegantes del Magallanes (Venezuela baseball league); Industriales de Monterrey (Mexico baseball league)

Career highlights and awards
- 2× pitching Triple Crown winner in Venezuelan league (1939, 1941, 1942); 3× Venezuelan league home run champion (1937; 1946–1947; 1949–1950); 2× Venezuelan league RBI champion (1946–1947; 1949–1950); 2× Venezuelan league batting champion (1945; 1947–1948); Venezuelan league championship manager (1950–1951); Pitched two no-hitters in a Venezuelan league season (1941); Hit the first grand slam in Venezuelan professional baseball history (1937); Led Cuban professional baseball league in wins and complete games (1940–1941); Cuban league All-Star (1940–1941); Puerto Rican league All-Star (1941–1942); Led Mexican league in ERA (1943); Three Caribbean Series appearances (1949–1951); Venezuelan Baseball Hall of Fame and Museum (2003); Latino Baseball Hall of Fame (2011)

Member of the Venezuelan

Baseball Hall of Fame
- Induction: 2003

Vidal López Ascanio (April 19, 1918 – February 20, 1971) was a Venezuelan professional baseball player and manager. He batted and threw right handed.

López starred as a starting pitcher and slugging outfielder in his homeland between the 1930s and 1950s. A long time member of the Navegantes del Magallanes in Venezuelan tournaments, his effort earned him a place in franchise lore.

In addition, López played in the professional leagues of Cuba, Mexico and Puerto Rico, overcoming color line prejudice throughout a career that lasted 21 years. He was well known for his solid batting, his long home runs and dominant pitching, while his popular nickname, El Muchachote de Barlovento (The Big Boy of Barlovento), was a testimony to his naive face and burly frame.

López was noted for his versatility as an outfielder, pitcher and manager.[1][2]

== Early life ==
López was born in Río Chico, a small farming community located in the Barlovento coastal area of Miranda state in Venezuela.

He was a six-year-old boy when his father died in 1924. Three years later, his mother decided to move to Caracas in search of better economic livelihood. As a result, he had to work from an early age to help cover household expenses, working as an errand or courier, as well as serving as an altar boy to earn money for shoes and clothes. He had no formal education but taught himself to write through reading.

When he was nine, he especially liked watching his friends and relatives play baseball on a sandlot team that played Saturday afternoons. A friend taught him to throw a baseball, and they played catch almost every day, which turned out to be the key to his future.

After a long while, López finally attended elementary school, but had to quit in order to take a formal job to help his impoverished mother and blind sister. A school official interceded, and with the help of a local merchant, they brokered a deal in which the young Vidal would go to school, but at same time have a job that would keep the family afloat. Only then was he given the chance to blossom into a gifted athlete, one who loved baseball more than anything imaginable.

== Professional career ==
=== Early years (1935–1940) ===
In 1935, at age 17, López debuted professionally with the Royal Criollos BBC of the newly created Liga Nacional de Béisbol, which had stabilized the first national championship of first division in Venezuela since its inauguration in 1930. The circuit included other three teams, which resulted in a revised weekend schedule of 24 games in which each team played its three opponents four times apiece. López emerged as a dominant shutdown starter in his debut, pitching in seven of the 12 games of his team and going 5–0 with 28 strikeouts and a minuscule 0.65 earned run average in 55 innings, guiding his team to the championship pennant.

López was used sparingly in his second year, but enjoyed a superb all-around season with the Sabios de Vargas in 1937, as he topped the league in home runs (4) and RBIs (12), while posting a .312 batting average with a 2-1 pitching record and a 2.77 ERA in three pitching appearances. In addition, he etched his name in the records books by setting two marks in Venezuelan baseball history. On August 22, he smashed a grand slam off Centauros' pitcher Oscar Estrada, which became the first grand slam ever hit in a Venezuelan ballpark. Then, on September 26 he also became the first player ever to hit two home runs in a single game.

By then, the appearance of professional baseball in Venezuela attracted many ball players from the Caribbean and the United States to the country, showing a more integrated sport there than it was in the United States. This is evidenced in the hiring of skilled pitchers like Ramón Bragaña, Martín Dihigo, Bertrum Hunter, Satchel Paige, Roy Welmaker and the aforementioned Estrada among others, to whom the teenage López had to face more than one once, either as a hitter or pitcher.

López returned after a one-year absence and was impressive on the mound for the repeating champion Vargas in 1939, going 5-1 with a league-best ERA of 1.71 and 30 strikeouts, allowing 12 earned runs on 47 hits and 12 walks in 63.0 innings. He also contributed as a two-way player, batting a .274 average, two homers and six RBIs in 23 games.

Traded to the Cardenales BBC in 1940, he tied with Centauros' Josh Gibson for the most home runs (4) and finished second in RBIs (11) behind teammate Chucho Ramos (14). He also made 14 pitching appearances, going 3-6 with a 3.44 ERA and 55 strikeours in 110 innings.

=== Cuba League (1940–1941) ===
After the regular season, López signed a contract to play with the Elefantes de Cienfuegos in the 1940–1941 Cuban League tournament. He quickly became the best pitcher of the league, topping all pitchers with 12 victories and 16 complete games, playing in a highly competitive league that boasted such pitching stars as Martín Dihigo, Agapito Mayor, Gilberto Torres, Tomás de la Cruz and Luis Tiant, Sr., as well as noted hitters as Lázaro Salazar, Ray Dandridge, Sam Bankhead, Roberto Estalella, Alejandro Crespo and Santos Amaro. That season, López also was involved in the fastest game played in Cuban baseball history, as he won a complete-game pitching duel against René Monteagudo and the Leopardos de Santa Clara by a score of 2–1, which lasted one hour and nine minutes. Eventually, López played in the outfield corners during his lone season in Cuba, but was also notable as he made the All-Star team and was just the second Venezuelan to play in the Cuban league after fellow pitcher Alejandro Carrasquel, an MVP Award winner in the 1938–1939 season.

=== First Triple Crown ===
The first and most important event in Venezuelan baseball history was the 1941 victory of the national selection over the Cuban squad in the Baseball World Cup tournament held in Havana. It served to consolidate baseball as the deporte rey –the dominant sport– in Venezuela in the years to come.

Even though López did not participate in the 1941 event, he had time to join the Venezuelan league after returning from Cuba. He was unquestionably the dominant pitcher in the circuit, fashioning a ledger of 9-4 with 55 strikeouts and a 0.67 ERA to win the pitching Triple Crown, while handling a 121-inning work in his first full season for Magallanes, allowing also only nine earned runs on 67 hits and 22 walks. As an ace pitcher and cleanup hitter, he also hurled two no-hitters, led in innings pitched, and smashed the only home run of the tournament. Although this was a wasted effort, because of the fact of his team lost the final and decisive game to the eventual champions Patriotas de Venezuela.

=== Puerto Rico League (1941–1942) ===
Short before the Venezuelan tournament ended, López arrived in San Juan, Puerto Rico to play with the Cangrejeros de Santurce one day before the 1941–1942 Puerto Rican season began.

López had some pretty memorable moments while playing in Puerto Rico. In his debut, he struck out 11 Tiburones de Aguadilla batters, including the side in the fifth inning, but lost the game. He rebounded in his next start, pitching a shutout against the Leones de Ponce and also homering in that win. Then, López faced Negro league star Terris McDuffie and the Senadores de San Juan in game one of a crucial series. During the game, Cangrejeros fans roared when López struck out Monte Irvin with the bases loaded and forced McDuffie to hit into an eight inning double play to preserve a 2–1 lead. Previously, López had driven in both Santurce runs with a single. He was carried off the field by the Santurce fans after the victory, while the Cangrejeros swept the two games of the series.

Nevertheless, Santurce lost several close games, being unable to match Ponce, the team that won both halves of the season led by slugger Francisco Coimbre. López was selected for the league All-Star games played on January 1, 1942. It had been three seasons since the league's first All-Star game took effect in 1938–1939. Besides López, both contests featured notable players as Barney, Raymond and Willard Brown (non-relatives), as well as Bill Byrd, Roy Campanella, Buster Clarkson, Ray Dandridge, Leon Day, Josh Gibson, Luis Olmo, Quincy Trouppe, Willie Wells, and Coimbre and Irvin, among others.

=== Second Triple Crown ===
After his stint in Puerto Rico, López joined the Cervecería Caracas club during the 1942–1943 season, as the Venezuelan league shifted players as needed to help new teams stay afloat.

During what turned out to be another productive season for López, he claimed his second and consecutive pitching Triple Crown in Venezuelan baseball.

He posted a 6–1 record with a 1.14 ERA and 26 strikeouts in his eight starts and also led in complete games (6), while scattering eight earned runs on 11 hits and 10 walks over 63 1/3 innings of work. To complement his fine performance, he contributed with a .313 average, drove in 20 runs, and posted a solid .417 of slugging in 12 games.

López went 3-3 with a 1.83 ERA and 25 strikeouts in 1943–1944, completing six of his eight pitching appearances for Magallanes. He also hit .375 with one home run and 12 RBIs in 18 games, while leading the league in doubles (6).

=== Mexico League (1943–1945) ===
López continued his success in the Mexican League from 1943 through 1945. There were just too many accomplished ballplayers, and not only from Mexico. The homegrown Mexican players included former Philadelphia Phillies and Washington Senators infielder Chile Gómez, as well as future American League champion bat Bobby Ávila, to name a few.

All Mexican league teams were also strengthened by an abundance of Cuban talent such as former Senators catcher Mike Guerra, who played and managed, while the versatile Martín Dihigo managed, pitched and excelled at second base. Ultimately, López improved at least from the perspective of his long term development as a two-way player, so he joined the league with the Industriales de Monterrey, where he formed a battery with future Hall of Fame catcher Roy Campanella.

López resulted victorious in his Mexican debut, compiling a 16-12 record with a 2.08 ERA and also hitting a .304 average in 78 games as an outfielder, while leading all pitchers in ERA and tying for fifth for the most wins.

In 1944, he again was a two-way star for Monterrey, batting a .280 average with 11 home runs and 60 RBI in 85 games, ranking also second with 23 stolen bases and tying for third in homers. As a pitcher, he fashioned a mark of 13-14 with a decent 3.70 ERA.

At the time, López was enjoying the best moment of his career, but then things began to change. Between Venezuela, Cuba, Puerto Rico and Mexico, López had worked close to 1,000 innings in his previous four years, a considerable amount of usage for anyone, but especially for a pitcher who was then only in his early twenties.

As a result, López was suffering from arm fatigue and a sore elbow in 1945, ending with a 0-1 record and a 9.00 ERA in only seven innings of work for Monterrey. Additionally, his offensive production declined as the season progressed, while batting .270 in limited action as an outfielder.

=== Venezuelan Professional Baseball League (1946–1955) ===
Briefly after returning from Mexico, López was kept under wraps due to his fears concerning his pitching arm. Unfortunately, the acute effects of overload pitching and nagging injuries rendered him ineffective with Magallanes in the 1945 season, losing his only start in which he gave up just two runs on 10 hits through seven innings, while striking out two batters and walking one. Nevertheless, he enjoyed a successful season as an outfielder, winning the batting crown with an average of .464 in 16 games, driving in 13 runs and scoring 14 times in 16 games, while also leading the league in hits (26), doubles (9), and slugging percentage (.714).

When the Venezuelan Professional Baseball League started to operate in 1946, López stayed with Magallanes for the rest oh his career and also managed the team in part of that season. He batted a paltry .216 average and three homers in 28 games, while his 23 RBIs ranked him fourth in the new circuit despite missing significant playing time due to recurrent injuries. He also realized that his pitching arm was gone, and though he might come back for a couple of games, he could never again pitch effectively at all, giving up three earned runs on four hits and five walks, while striking one in his final three innings of work. López became the first player to pinch-hit a home run in VPBL history in that season, when he belted his blast off Vargas' ace pitcher Roy Welmaker.

López rebounded sharply during the 1947–1948 season, winning the batting title with a .374 average, driving in 29 RBIs and collecting a .532 of slugging in 39 games, while again managing Magallanes for a brief stint. He also led the VPBL in hits (52), had six RBIs less than leader Dalmiro Finol (Cerveceria), tied for fourth in home runs (4), and finished fourth in slugging, being surpassed only by Luke Easter (Patriotas), Henry McHenry (Magallanes) and Roy Campanella (Vargas).

In 1948–1949, López served as an outfielder and part-time manager with Magallanes for a third season in a row. He topped the league with 29 RBIs and batted a second-best .372 average, losing the batting race to Caracas' shortstop Chico Carrasquel by a narrow margin (.37288 to .37209). He then reinforced the Cervecería Caracas champion team in the First Caribbean Series to be played in 1949, going 1-for-2 in a pitch-hitting role.

López posted another strong offensive performance in 1949–1950, when he batted .355 and led the league with nine home runs and 43 RBIs in 49 games. He also led the hitters with a slugging of .645, .009 points ahead teammate Jim Pendleton, and finished second in batting average, .32 points shy of Pendleton. This time, López managed Magallanes to the pennant and advanced to the 1950 Caribbean Series. The team finished last with a 1–5 record, while López went 4-for-15 and paced the offense with a team-high four RBIs, leading also the Series in doubles (4) and tying for fourth in RBIs.

In 1950–1951 López hit .359 with five homers and 36 RBIs in 35 games, helping Magallanes win a second consecutive pennant and a ticket to the 1951 Caribbean Series. He went 3-for-6, including a double and one RBI as a backup outfielder and pinch-hitter, in what would be his final Series appearance.

In later years López suffered problems with his weight and old injuries, which disminished his effectiveness on the field. Nevertheless, he mastered the art of pinch-hitting and eventually played decent defense in the outfield corners. He declined in the 1951–1952 season, lowering his average to .240, while batting two home runs with 19 RBIs in 41 games. Used exclusively as a pinch hitter in the next two seasons, he went 2-for-19 with a double, retiring after the 1954–1955 tournament.

== Career statistics ==
Note: Some statistics are incomplete because there are no records available.
Bold denotes category leader.

=== Batting ===
Season	Team	League	GP	AB	R	H	2B	3B	HR	RBI	SB	BA	SLG	Ref
1935	Royal Criollos BBC	LNB	8	23	3	6	1	0	0	4	1	.261	.304	
1936	Deportivo Caracas BBC	LNB	15	56	2	14	2	1	1	4	1	.250	.375	
1937	Vargas BBC	LNB	16	61	14	19	1	0	**4**	**12**	1	.311	.525	
1938	Did not play													
1939	Vargas BBC	LNB	23	73	9	20	2	0	2	6	2	.274	.384	
1940	Cardenales BBC	LNB	22	83	13	23	**4**	1	**4**	11	1	.277	.494	
1940–1941	Cienfuegos	CUB	-	74	5	18	2	0	0	6	0	.243	.257	
1941	Magallanes BBC	LNB	14	52	3	14	**4**	0	1	4	0	.269	.404	
1941–1942	Santurce	PUR	-	-	-	-	-	-	-	-	-	-	-	
1942–1943	Cervecería Caracas	LNB	12	48	10	15	3	1	0	20	0	.313	.417	
1943	Monterrey	MEX	-	-	-	-	-	-	-	-	-	.304	-	
1943–1944	Magallanes BBC	LNB	18	56	15	21	**6**	0	**1**	12	0	.375	.536	
1944	Monterrey	MEX	-	-	-	-	-	-	11	60	-	.280	-	
1945	Magallanes BBC	LNB	16	56	14	**26**	**9**	1	1	13	0	**.464**	**.714**	
1945	Monterrey	MEX	-	-	-	-	-	-	-	-	-	.270	-	
1946	Navegantes del Magallanes	VPBL	28	134	18	29	5	0	3	23	3	.216	.321	
1946–1947	Navegantes del Magallanes	VPBL	36	120	19	38	9	0	**6**	25	0	.319	.467	
1947–1948	Navegantes del Magallanes	VPBL	39	139	19	**52**	10	0	4	29	1	**.374**	.511	
1948–1949	Navegantes del Magallanes	VPBL	29	86	12	32	5	0	2	.29	0	.372	.500	
1949–1950	Navegantes del Magallanes	VPBL	49	141	24	50	14	0	**9**	**43**	0	.355	.645	
1950–1951	Navegantes del Magallanes	VPBL	35	103	16	37	5	0	5	36	0	.359	.553	
1951–1952	Navegantes del Magallanes	VPBL	41	100	10	24	5	0	2	19	0	.240	.350	
1952–1953	Navegantes del Magallanes	VPBL	33	62	8	14	0	0	2	8	0	.226	.323	
1953–1954	Navegantes del Magallanes	VPBL	17	17	0	2	1	0	0	3	0	.118	.176	
1954–1955	Navegantes del Magallanes	VPBL	3	2	0	0	0	0	0	0	0	.000	.000	

=== Pitching ===
Bold denotes category leader.

Season	Team	League	W	L	W-L%	ERA	GP	GS	CG	SV	IP	HA	ER	SO	BB	Ref
1935	Royal Criollos BBC	LNB	**5**	0	1.000	**0.65**	7	7	**5**	0	55.0	24	**4**	28	17	
1936	Deportivo Caracas BBC	LNB	3	1	.750	2.25	5	5	3	0	44.0	47	11	18	15	
1937	Vargas BBC	LNB	1	1	.500	2.77	2	2	1	0	13.0	11	4	14	1	
1938	Did not play															
1939	Vargas BBC	LNB	5	1	.833	**1.71**	8	8	6	0	63.0	47	12	30	12	
1940	Cardenales BBC	LNB	3	6	.333	3.44	14	14	6	SV	110.0	123	42	55	30	
1940–1941	Cienfuegos	CUB	**12**	5	.706	-	20	-	**16**	-	-	-	-	-	-	
1941	Magallanes BBC	LNB	**9**	**4**	.692	**0.67**	14	14	12	0	**121.0**	67	**9**	**55**	22	
1941–1942	Santurce	PUR	-	-	-	-	-	-	-	-	-	-	-	-	-	
1942–1943	Cervecería Caracas	LNB	**6**	**1**	**.857**	**1.14**	8	8	**6**	0	63 1/3	62	8	**26**	10	
1943	Monterrey	MEX	16	12	.571	**2.08**	-	-	-	-	-	-	-	-	-	
1943–1944	Magallanes BBC	LNB	3	3	.500	1.83	8	8	6	0	73 2/3	70	15	25	10	
1944	Monterrey	MEX	13	14	4.81	3.70	-	-	-	-	-	-	-	-	-	
1945	Magallanes BBC	LNB	0	1	.000	2.57	1	1	0	0	7.0	10	2	2	1	
1945	Monterrey	MEX	0	1	.000	9.00	-	-	-	-	-	-	-	-	-	
1946	Navegantes del Magallanes	VPBL	W	L	W-L%	ERA	2	1	0	0	3.0	4	1	1	5	

== Twilight years ==
After retiring from playing, López remained active by coaching and instructing youth players in Caracas. Everyman's ballplayer, he worked to overcome the challenges he faced in life and baseball. Although he had no opportunity to play at Major League Baseball, he simply took the best he could find and took advantage of it. He permanently adjusted and readjusted his hitting style and pitching mechanics, came back from many injuries, but the Big Boy of Barlovento (el Muchachote de Barlovento in Spanish) persevered and won recognition as pitcher and slugger in all leagues where he played.

== Honors and Acknowledgments ==
In 2003 López received the honor of induction into the Venezuelan Baseball Hall of Fame and Museum as part of their first class.

After that, he was inducted into the Latino Baseball Hall of Fame through the Veterans Committee in 2011. Then, in 2012 he became an inaugural inductee into the Navegantes del Magallanes Hall of Fame.

In addition, a baseball park in Caracas is named after him, and has a monument honouring him erected in his hometown of Rio Chico, Miranda.
