= Javier Gortazar Manso =

Spanish politician

Javier Vicente Manso de Velasco (2 December 1878 – 14 January 1977) was a politician, nationalist, and the son of Manuel Maria Vicente. He was an industrialist and a member of the Basque Nationalist Party, and founded the Euzkadi newspaper in 1913, together with Jose Maria Goia and Luis Arroyo. He founded and directed the nationalist association Juventud Vasca in Bilbao (1912–1916). He was one of the promoters in 1918, and was involved in the creation of the newspapers Excelsior and La Tarde. As a result of the 1936 war, he moved to Lapurdi and represented the Basque Government in Bayonne in the years 1940 to 1959.
