= Terris McDuffie =

American baseball player

- Pitcher
- Born: May 22, 1910; Mobile, Alabama, U.S.
- Died: April 29, 1968 (aged 57); New York City, New York, U.S.
- Batted: Right Threw: Right

Teams
- Negro leagues: Birmingham Black Barons (1930–1931); Atlantic City Bacharach Giants (1932); Pollock's Cuban Stars (1932); Hilldale Daisies (1932); Baltimore Black Sox (1932–1934); Pennsylvania Red Caps of New York (1934); Brooklyn Eagles (1935); New York Black Yankees (1935–1936; 1938–1939; 1944); Newark Eagles (1936–1938; 1944–1945); Homestead Grays (1937; 1941–1942); Baltimore Elite Giants (1939); Philadelphia Stars (1940, 1942); Provincial League: St. Jean Braves (1948–1949); Sherbrooke Athletics (1951); Minor leagues: Dallas Eagles (1954); Cuban league: Leones de la Habana (1937; 1945–1946; 1946–1947; 1947–1948); Elefantes de Cienfuegos (1940–1941; 1944–1945); Alacranes del Almendares (1940–1941; 1950–1951); Tigres de Marianao (1952–1953); Dominican league: Águilas Cibaeñas (1952); Mexican league: Gallos de Santa Rosa (1940); Algodoneros de Torreón (1943; 1946); Tecolotes de Nuevo Laredo (1945); Aguilas de Veracruz (1947); Puerto Rican league: Senadores de San Juan (1941–1942); Cangrejeros de Santurce (1944–1945); Venezuelan league: Navegantes del Magallanes (1949–1950; 1950–1951)

Career highlights and awards
- Three-time East-West All-Star Game (1939; 1941; 1944); Dominican League MVP Award (1952); Caribbean Series appearance (1950); Cuban Baseball Hall of Fame induction (Phase IV, 2007)

Terris Chester McDuffie (May 22, 1910 – April 29, 1968) was an American professional baseball player. He was listed at 6 ft 1 in (1.85 m), 200 lb (91 kg).

Born in Mobile, Alabama, McDuffie was a pitcher, best known as a strong-armed hurler who could challenge hitters with his live fastball. His career spanned from 1930 through 1954. He played for several teams in different leagues across the United States, Canada, and Latin America.

His repertoire of pitches also included a sinker, slider, curveball, and a deceptive changeup. Total records are lost, but McDuffie amassed up to an estimated 200 wins throughout the baseball circuits in which he played.

McDuffie was a competent hitter, baserunner, and self-promoter. He often received more attention for his handsome appearance, flashy dress, gold jewelry, flamboyant behavior, and his personal life rather than for his ball playing. He was known for being a crowd-pleaser for wearing an expressive jacket with the words The Great McDuffie emblazoned on the back in large letters.

== Professional career ==
=== Negro leagues ===
McDuffie started his baseball career in 1930 as an outfielder for the Birmingham Black Barons, hitting a .297 batting average with a .353 on-base percentage and leading the Negro leagues with 18 stolen bases. He batted .273 for Birmingham in 1931, but soon switched to the mound and began developing his pitching skills.

He frequently changed teams between 1932 and 1933, including stints with the Atlantic City Bacharach Giants, Pollock's Cuban Stars, Hilldale Daisies, and Baltimore Black Sox before joining the Pennsylvania Red Caps of New York in 1934. In that season, he pitched an 18-inning, 3–1 victory over the Jacksonville Red Caps and hurled a no-hitter for the Brooklyn Eagles against the House of David club the next year. He moved to the consolidated Brooklyn-Newark Eagles late in 1936, playing for them through the 1937 midseason.

McDuffie struggled in 1936 while battling stomach ailments that would ail him in later years as well. He rebounded in 1937, going 10–4 with a 3.07 ERA, and hurled two victories over Satchel Paige in three matchups. He quickly became a favorite of Effa Manley, who along with her husband Abe Manley, was co-owner of the Eagles. She took an active role in the team, serving as manager and scheduler. Sometimes she took such an active role as to impact the lives of the players. For instance, she tried to control the antics of McDuffie inside and outside the ballpark.

Terris the Terrible, as he was dubbed, amassed a 13–2 record for Newark in 1938 while completing his 18 starts. But he was also at the center of a controversy when the Eagles players and staff hinted at a possible sentimental relation between Mrs. Manley and McDuffie. While there is no conclusive evidence to support whether or not she and McDuffie had an affair, Abe Manley promptly traded him to the New York Black Yankees.

Overall, his 1938 pitching record of 14–4 was second in the league, one win behind Homestead Grays ace Ray Brown.

After that, McDuffie spent 1939 with the Black Yankees and the Baltimore Elite Giants and made his first appearance in the East-West All-Star Game in a relief role. He ended the year in the California Winter League, the first integrated baseball circuit in the 20th century as players from Major League Baseball and the Negro leagues played each other in training games. McDuffie led the league's pitchers with a 5–3 record, surpassing Johnny Lindell, Bob Feller, Lee Stine, George Darrow, Tom Glover, and Pat Tobin, among others.

=== Mexico League ===
For the next decade, McDuffie split his playing time between the Negro leagues and the Mexican League. He opened 1940 with the Philadelphia Stars but jumped to the Gallos de Santa Rosa Mexican team early in the year. Then, the Homestead Grays signed him in 1941. He posted a 27–5 record for the Grays, helping the team win the 1941 Negro National League Pennant, and also was the starter and winning pitcher in the East-West All-Star Game.

McDuffie remained with the Grays until 1942 and then played in Mexico with the Algodoneros de Torreón in the 1943 season. He rejoined the Eagles in 1944 because of his status draft and started the East-West All-Star Game, but did not have a decision in the game. During the 1945 spring, he auditioned for the Brooklyn Dodgers general manager Branch Rickey, who made no offer. McDuffie was 34 years old at the time, and well past his prime.

At one point after World War II, McDuffie was the highest-paid player in the Eastern division of the Negro with a salary of $6,000 a year. He spent part of 1945 with the Eagles before joining the Mexican Tecolotes de Nuevo Laredo late in the season. He later returned to Torreón in 1946 and played for the Aguilas de Veracruz in 1947, during what would be his last season in the Mexican League. McDuffie suffered serious and debilitating illnesses that affected his performance in the league. In 1945 he missed time due to an appendix operation, while the following year he had a stomach operation to remove an internal growth. He finished with a record of 21–33 in Mexico.

=== Provincial League ===
McDuffie later pitched for the St. Jean Braves and Sherbrooke Athletics of the Quebec Provincial League between 1948 and 1951. In his first season, he tied teammate/manager Jean-Pierre Roy for the most wins in the league with nineteen, and later went 7–1 for the 1951 Sherbrooke champion team. In between, he also played in Cuba, Puerto Rico, Venezuela and the Dominican Republic.

=== Cuba League ===
Following his path through the Caribbean, McDuffie played in the Cuban League for the Leones de la Habana, Elefantes de Cienfuegos, Alacranes del Almendares, and Tigres de Marianao, in part or all of nine seasons spanning 1937–1953.

While playing for Marianao in 1952–1953 McDuffie had the misfortune to play for manager Dolf Luque, a former major league pitcher who was notorious for his bad temper and conflicts with other people. During a playoff series, Luque wanted McDuffie to start on two days rest, but McDuffie said his arm was sore. Once the enraged manager returned to the locker room from his adjacent office waving a loaded pistol and pointing it at the pitcher, McDuffie quickly changed his mind, went out and fired a two-hitter game.

His most productive season in Cuba came with Cienfuegos in 1944–1945, when he posted a 7–6 record and a league's second-best 2.35 ERA in twenty games while leading in complete games (9), strikeouts (68), walks (43), and innings pitched (138). He compiled a 37–43 record during his Cuban visits.

=== Puerto Rico League ===
McDuffie also spent parts of two seasons in the Puerto Rico League. He played for the Senadores de San Juan in the 1941–1942 tournament, joining a team that featured Monte Irvin, Luis Olmo and Bill Wright.

=== Venezuela League ===
In addition, McDuffie played for the Navegantes del Magallanes of the Venezuelan Professional Baseball League during the 1949–1950 and 1950–1951 seasons. He reported late for his first stint with Magallanes, but posted a 3–0 record and a solid 1.86 ERA in four pitching appearances, including three starts and two complete games, helping the team win the pennant.

=== Caribbean Series ===
The Venezuelan club finished with a 1–5 record in the Series, while McDuffie lost his two starts against Luis Arroyo and the Criollos de Caguas by scores of 2–1 and 3–2, suggesting a bit of bad luck. In his first start McDuffie was blanking the Puerto Rico team 1–0 on three hits through eight-plus innings, but gave up a two-out, pinch-hit two-run homer to Wilmer Fields in the bottom of the ninth, and Caguas won the contest 2–1. He lasted seven innings in his second start, giving up three runs on six hits, while Magallanes batted just six singles and left seven runners on base. McDuffie posted a 0–2 record and a 2.87 ERA in 15 2/3 innings of work, while limiting the opposing batters to a .200 average, and did not return to the Series.

He declined in his second season with Magallanes, going 1–3 with a 6.86 ERA in seven games (three starts).

=== Dominican Republic League ===
McDuffie pitched in the Dominican Professional Baseball League in 1952. He posted a 14–3 record in the regular season and went 2–0 with a save in the playoffs, as the Aguilas Cibaeñas defeated the Tigres del Licey in the maximum of seven games to claim the championship title. McDuffie won the MVP award for his contribution in three of the four victories of his team. He has been culturally referenced as the creator of the popular catchphrase La hit no gana juego (Hits do not win games), a reference to the many hits he allowed, but still ended up winning the games.

=== Texas League ===
At age 44, he had the last run in the Texas League with the Dallas Steers club in 1954, posting a 3–4 record and a 3.04 ERA in 14 games (nine starts). A leg injury during the season ended his playing days. He combined a career record of 88–53 record between the minors and Negro league baseball.

== After baseball ==
In 1968, McDuffie died in New York City at the age of 57. In 2007, he received the honor of induction into the Cuban Baseball Hall of Fame based in Miami, as part of their Phase IV.
