= Johnny Hetki =

American baseball player (1922–2019)

- Pitcher
- Born: May 12, 1922; Leavenworth, Kansas, U.S.
- Died: January 10, 2019 (aged 96); Parma, Ohio, U.S.
- Batted: Right Threw: Right

MLB debut
- September 14, 1945, for the Cincinnati Reds

Last MLB appearance
- September 22, 1954, for the Pittsburgh Pirates

MLB statistics
- Win–loss record: 18–26
- Earned run average: 4.39
- Saves: 13
- Games pitched: 214
- Stats at Baseball Reference

Teams
- Cincinnati Reds (1945–1948; 1950); St. Louis Browns (1952); Pittsburgh Pirates (1953–1954)

John Edward Hetki (May 12, 1922 – January 10, 2019) was an American long relief pitcher in Major League Baseball who played for the Cincinnati Reds, St. Louis Browns and Pittsburgh Pirates in all or parts of eight seasons spanning 1945–54. Listed at 6 ft 1 in (1.85 m), 202 lb (92 kg), Hetki batted and threw right-handed. He was born in Leavenworth, Kansas.

== Minor league career ==
Hetki first played in the Minor Leagues at the age of 18. He had a promising debut, winning 16 games and losing 10 for the Albuquerque Cardinals of the Arizona–Texas League in 1941. Hetki then was signed by the Reds organization before the 1942 season, and he went 4–1 with a 2.16 ERA with the Birmingham Barons before joining the Ogden Reds, where he was 13–8 and led the Pioneer League with a 2.24 ERA. Overall, he finished the split season with a 17–9 record and a 2.22 ERA in 29 games pitched. His career was interrupted, however, by two years of military service during World War II.

== Major league career ==
Returning to baseball in early 1945, Hetki made his major league debut with the Reds in September of that year. He went 1–2 with a 3.58 ERA in two starts and three relief appearances. His most productive season came in 1946, when he finished 6–6 with a 2.99 ERA in 32 games, including 11 starts and four complete games. Hetki was with the Reds through the 1950 season, spending part of this time in the minor leagues. As a result, in 1949 he went 16–14 for the Syracuse Chiefs of the International League, ending fifth in the league in wins and second in innings (250) behind Al Widmar (294). He then was purchased by the St. Louis Browns from Cincinnati in October 1950.

Hetki spent 1951 with the Toronto Maple Leafs, and this time he led the International League with 19 victories and 256 innings pitched, while tying for second in ERA with Karl Drews (2.85) behind Jackie Collum (2.80). He was called up by the Browns in 1952 and appeared in only three outings for St. Louis, going 0–1. After that, he was selected by the Pittsburgh Pirates from the Browns in the 1952 Rule 5 draft. Working mostly out of the bullpen, Hetki won 3 and lost 6 for the Pirates in 1953 and went 4–4 in 1954, leading the National League in games finished (46) in that last season.

Overall, Hetki posted an 18–26 record with a 4.39 ERA and 13 saves in 214 pitching appearances (23 starts), striking out 175 batters while walking 185 in 525 1/3 innings of work. Additionally, he went 101–71 with an ERA of 3.27 in eight Minor League seasons between 1942 and 1956.

As a hitter, Hetki posted a .235 batting average (27-for-115) with no home runs and 6 RBI in 214 games. Defensively, he committed only one error in 119 total chances for a .992 fielding percentage.

== Winter league career ==
In between, Hetki played winter ball from 1951–52 with the Navegantes del Magallanes club of the Venezuelan Professional Baseball League, collecting an 18–12 record with a 3.26 ERA in 52 games during the two seasons. On February 14, 1952, Hetki made history during the longest game played in Winter League history, as Magallanes and Cervecería Caracas battled to a 3–3, 18–inning tie game which lasted three hours and ten minutes. Hetki hurled all 18 innings for Magallanes, setting a record for a pitcher that still stands.

Hetki later pitched two complete games for the VPBL champion Magallanes in the 1952 Caribbean Series, including an 11-inning, 2–1 victory against Panama's champion Carta Vieja Yankees.

== Later years ==
After baseball, Hetki worked for several years as a traffic foreman for Simpkins Industries in Cleveland, Ohio. He moved to Parma, Ohio, after retiring. He died on January 10, 2019.
