= Frankie Austin =

Panamanian baseball player (1917–1960)

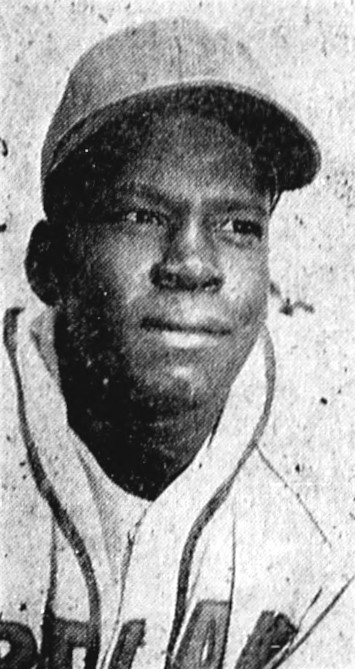
- Austin, circa 1955
- Shortstop
- Born: May 22, 1917; Panama Canal Zone
- Died: January 15, 1960 (aged 43); Panama City, Panama
- Batted: Right Threw: Right

Negro league baseball debut
- 1944, for the Philadelphia Stars

Last Negro league baseball appearance
- 1948, for the Philadelphia Stars

Negro National League statistics
- Batting average: .343
- Hits: 346
- Home runs: 3
- Runs batted in: 139
- Stolen bases: 23
- Stats at Baseball Reference

Teams
- Philadelphia Stars (1944–1948)

Frank Samuel "Pee Wee" Austin (May 22, 1917 – January 15, 1960) was a Panamanian professional baseball shortstop in the Negro leagues.

Austin played professionally from 1944 to 1956, playing with the Philadelphia Stars of the Negro National League from 1944 to 1948. He played in the 1945 East-West All-Star Game. Austin played in the International League in 1949, and the Pacific Coast League from 1949 to 1956. Although he never played in the Major Leagues, Austin was one of the first two black players to play for the New York Yankees organization in 1949 along with Luis Marquez.
