= Red Adams =

American baseball player and coach (1921–2017)

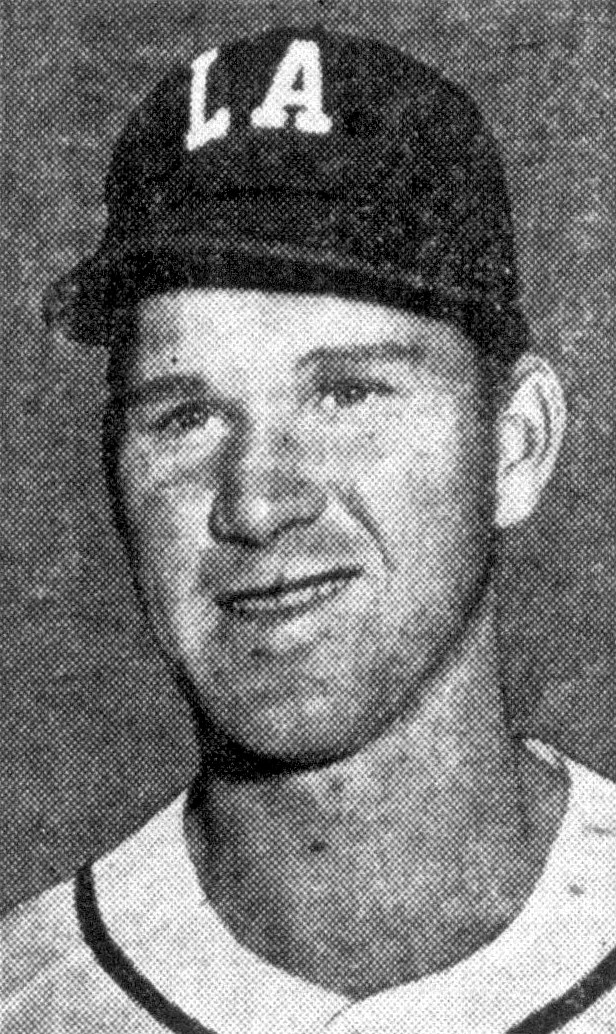
- Adams, circa 1944
- Pitcher
- Born: October 7, 1921; Parlier, California, U.S.
- Died: January 18, 2017 (aged 95); Fresno, California, U.S.
- Batted: Right Threw: Right

MLB debut
- May 5, 1946, for the Chicago Cubs

Last MLB appearance
- July 2, 1946, for the Chicago Cubs

MLB statistics
- Win–loss record: 0–1
- Earned run average: 8.25
- Strikeouts: 8
- Stats at Baseball Reference

Teams
- As player: Chicago Cubs (1946); As coach: Los Angeles Dodgers (1969–1980)

Charles Dwight "Red" Adams (October 7, 1921 – January 18, 2017) was an American professional baseball pitcher, scout and pitching coach. The native of Parlier, California, pitched only briefly in Major League Baseball, but had a lengthy career as a scout and coach for the Los Angeles Dodgers. A right-hander in his playing days, he stood 6 feet (1.8 m) tall and weighed 185 pounds (84 kg).

Adams won 193 games in the minor leagues from 1939 to 1942 and 1944 to 1958, including a 21-victory season for the 1945 Los Angeles Angels of the Pacific Coast League. His Major League pitching tenure, however, consisted of only 12 innings over eight games for the Chicago Cubs in 1946. All of his appearances came in relief. His one decision came on Memorial Day, when he allowed a game-winning home run to Ray Mueller of the Cincinnati Reds, which capped a six-run, ninth-inning rally and enabled Cincinnati to defeat Chicago, 7–6, at Wrigley Field, in the second game of the holiday doubleheader. Adams allowed 11 earned runs, 18 hits and seven bases on balls in 12 total innings pitched during his MLB career, with eight strikeouts.

After his playing career, he was a scout for the Dodgers from 1959 to 1968. He then worked as the Dodgers' MLB pitching coach from 1969 to 1980, serving on three National League pennant-winning teams (1974; 1977–78) under managers Walter Alston and Tommy Lasorda, and helping develop many of the Dodgers' pitchers.

Said 324-game-winning pitcher Don Sutton upon his induction into the Baseball Hall of Fame in July 1998: "No person ever meant more to my career than Red Adams. Without him, I would not be standing in Cooperstown today." Tommy John, a 288-game winner, also had praise for Adams. "When I joined the [Dodgers in 1972], I was still convinced that I had only a mediocre fastball and that I was going to have to depend chiefly on my breaking pitches to win ball games. But Red disagreed with me, emphatically," John said. Adams encouraged him to rely more on the fastball, which though slower than most pitchers' fastballs, had a lot of movement.

In 1979, Adams was inducted into the Fresno County Athletic Hall of Fame. He died on January 18, 2017, at the age of 95.

| Preceded by Lefty Phillips | Los Angeles Dodgers pitching coach 1969–1980 | Succeeded by Ron Perranoski |
