= Bob Griffith =

American baseball player

- Pitcher
- Born: October 1, 1912; Liberty, Tennessee, U.S.
- Died: November 8, 1977 (aged 65); Indianapolis, Indiana, U.S.
- Batted: Left Threw: Right

Negro league baseball debut
- 1934, for the Nashville Elite Giants

Last appearance
- 1951, for the Granby Red Sox
- Stats at Baseball Reference

Teams
- Nashville Elite Giants (1934); Columbus Elite Giants (1935); Washington Elite Giants (1936–1937); Baltimore Elite Giants (1938, 1941); New York Black Yankees (1942–1943, 1946–1948); Newark Eagles (1945); Memphis Red Sox (1948); Philadelphia Stars (1949); Granby Red Sox (1951)

Robert Lee Griffith (October 1, 1912 – November 8, 1977) was an American professional baseball pitcher in the Negro leagues who played for several teams between 1934 and 1951.

A native of Liberty, Tennessee, Griffith served in the US Army during World War II. He was a three-time pitcher in the East-West All-Star Game (1935; 1948–1949), Griffith also played in the Cuba, Dominican Republic, Mexico and Venezuela professional leagues. Listed at 6' 5", 235 lb., he batted and threw right-handed and was nicknamed 'Schoolboy' or 'Big Bill'. Griffith died in Indianapolis, Indiana in 1977 at age 65.
