= Cot Deal =

American baseball player (1923–2013)

- Pitcher
- Born: January 23, 1923; Arapaho, Oklahoma, U.S.
- Died: May 21, 2013 (aged 90); Oklahoma City, Oklahoma, U.S.
- Batted: Switch Threw: Right

MLB debut
- September 11, 1947, for the Boston Red Sox

Last MLB appearance
- September 9, 1954, for the St. Louis Cardinals

MLB statistics
- Win–loss record: 3–4
- Earned run average: 6.55
- Strikeouts: 34
- Stats at Baseball Reference

Teams
- Boston Red Sox (1947–1948); St. Louis Cardinals (1950, 1954)

Ellis Ferguson "Cot" Deal (January 23, 1923 – May 21, 2013) was an American pitcher and coach in Major League Baseball. Listed at 5 ft 10.5 in (1.79 m), 185 lb (84 kg), Deal was a switch-hitter and threw right-handed. A native of Arapaho, Oklahoma, he grew up in Oklahoma City and was nicknamed "Cot" for his cotton-top hair color.

Deal had a career in baseball from 1940 through 1989 and interrupted only by military service during World War II (1943–44). He spent 48 years in baseball as a player (20), manager (5), coach (22) and executive (1).

Deal died on May 21, 2013, in Oklahoma City.

== Playing career ==
As a sixteen-year-old, Deal was invited by the Pittsburgh Pirates to spend in week in Pittsburgh. By then, the club was managed by Pie Traynor, who gave Deal his first baseball tryout. After signing with Pittsburgh, he spent 1940 with the Hutchinson, Kansas team of the Western Association, hitting a .312 average while splitting time between the outfield and third base. The next year he gained promotion to the Harrisburg Pirates of the Interstate League, playing for them two seasons before joining the military. In 1945, he played in the International League with the Toronto Maple Leafs as a pitcher, and was sold to the Boston Red Sox in 1947. Late in the season he was called up to the Red Sox, making his debut on September 11 as a pinch-hitter. In his first major league at bat, he connected a game-winning RBI single off Cleveland Indians pitcher Bob Lemon, while posting a 0–1 mark in five appearances.

Deal earned a spot as a starting pitcher during 1948 spring training, but hurt his arm after that. He would eventually pitch in four games with the Red Sox that year and went 1–0 with a perfect 0.00 ERA in 4 innings of relief. In 1949 he was traded by Boston to the St. Louis Cardinals in exchange for a minor leaguer. He spent 1949 with the Columbus Red Birds of the American Association and later pitched in 36 games for the Cardinals in 1950 and 1954.

In four major league seasons Deal posted a 3–4 record with a 6.55 ERA in 45 games, including two starts, 34 strikeouts, 48 walks, 12 games finished, one save, and 89 1/3 innings of work. As a hitter, he collected a .167 batting average (4-for-24), including one home run, one double, five runs, and four RBI. His one save came on August 22, 1954, against the Cincinnati Redlegs.

Deal later established himself in the St. Louis organization as an outfielder, catcher and switch-hitting pinch-hitter, while winning 108 games as a pitcher. His highlights included starting and completing a twenty-inning game for Columbus against the Louisville Colonels on September 3, 1949, and collected four hits in eight at bats. He also hit a home run during the 1952 Caribbean Series while playing as a pitcher/outfielder for the Puerto Rico team. Between 1951 and 1959, Deal spent most of those years with the Cardinals' AAA International League farm team, the Rochester Red Wings. He had a record of 61–38 as a pitcher for Rochester. Deal also was a utility outfielder, back-up catcher and pinch-hitter for the Red Wings.

== Coaching career ==
When Rochester manager Dixie Walker resigned after the 1956 season Deal was the first choice to manage the 1957 Red Wings. Deal would manage the Red Wings until he resigned in August 1959. He was inducted into the Red Wings' Hall of Fame in 1994.

Following his playing career Deal served as a pitching coach for the Cincinnati Reds (1959–60), Houston Colt .45s (1962–64), New York Yankees (1965), Kansas City Athletics (1966–67), Cleveland Indians (1970–71) and Detroit Tigers (1973–74). He also worked as outfield coach and defensive coordinator with the Houston Astros (1983–85), as assistant minor league director for the Chicago White Sox (1986), and with the San Francisco Giants organization as minor league hitting and outfield coach (1987–89).

As a minor league manager Deal led the Indianapolis Indians to the 1961 American Association championship. He also managed the Oklahoma 89ers (PCL, 1968; AA, 1969); coached and managed the Toledo Mud Hens (IL, 1972 and 1973); coached the Columbus Clippers (IL, 1978), and returned with the PCL Oklahoma team as coach and interim manager (1979–82).

Preceded by Clyde King	Cincinnati Reds pitching coach 1959–1960	Succeeded by Jim Turner
Preceded by Franchise created	Houston Colt .45s pitching coach 1962–1964	Succeeded by Howie Pollet
Preceded by Whitey Ford	New York Yankees pitching coach 1965	Succeeded by Jim Turner
Preceded by Tom Ferrick	Kansas City Athletics pitching coach 1966–1967	Succeeded by Wes Stock
Preceded by Jack Sanford	Cleveland Indians pitching coach 1970–1971	Succeeded by Warren Spahn
Preceded by Art Fowler	Detroit Tigers pitching coach 1973–1974	Succeeded by Steve Hamilton
