= Roy Easterwood =

American baseball player (1915–1984)

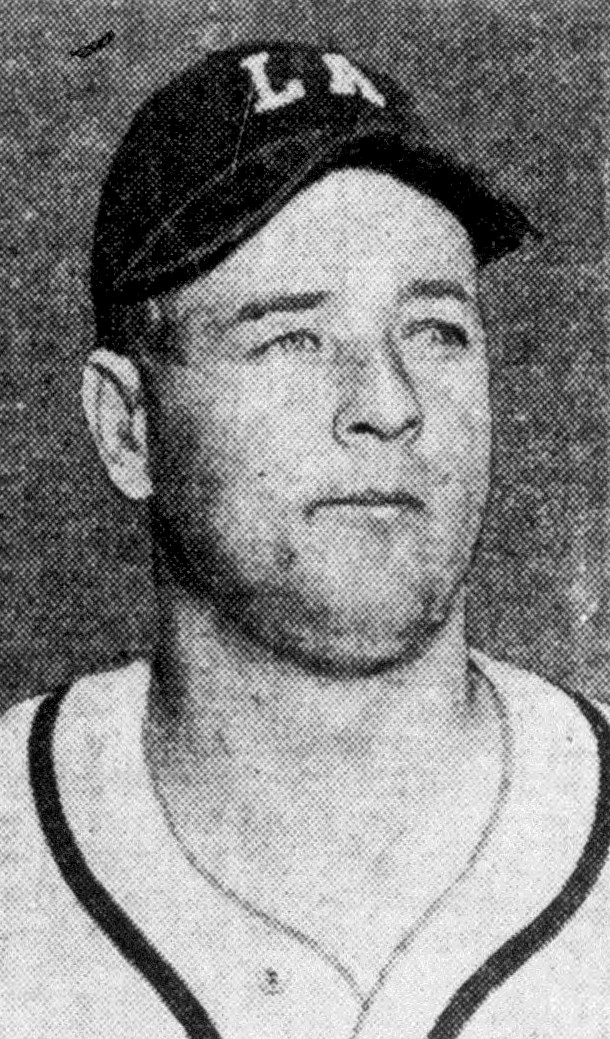
- Easterwood, circa 1945
- Catcher
- Born: January 12, 1915; Waxahachie, Texas, U.S.
- Died: August 24, 1984 (aged 69); Graham, Texas, U.S.
- Batted: Right Threw: Right

MLB debut
- April 21, 1944, for the Chicago Cubs

Last MLB appearance
- June 25, 1944, for the Chicago Cubs

MLB statistics
- Batting average: .212
- Home runs: 1
- Runs batted in: 2
- Stats at Baseball Reference

Teams
- Chicago Cubs (1944)

Roy Charles Easterwood (January 12, 1915 – August 24, 1984) was an American Major League Baseball catcher who played for the Chicago Cubs in 1944. A native of Waxahachie, Texas, the 29-year-old rookie stood 6 ft 0 in (1.83 m) and weighed 196 lbs.

Easterwood is one of many ballplayers who only appeared in the major leagues during World War II. He made his major league debut on April 21, 1944 in a home game against the St. Louis Cardinals at Wrigley Field.

His season and career totals for 17 games include a .212 batting average (7-for-33), one home run, 2 runs batted in, one run scored, and a .364 slugging percentage. In 12 appearances as a catcher he handled 33 chances without an error for a fielding percentage of 1.000.

Easterwood died at the age of 69 in Graham, Texas.
