= Tony Jacobs =

American baseball player (1925–1980)

- Pitcher
- Born: August 5, 1925; Dixmoor, Illinois, U.S.
- Died: December 21, 1980 (aged 55); Nashville, Tennessee, U.S.
- Batted: Right Threw: Right

MLB debut
- September 19, 1948, for the Chicago Cubs

Last MLB appearance
- April 12, 1955, for the St. Louis Cardinals

MLB statistics
- Win–loss record: 0–0
- Earned run average: 11.25
- Innings pitched: 4
- Stats at Baseball Reference

Teams
- Chicago Cubs (1948); St. Louis Cardinals (1955)

Anthony Robert Jacobs (August 5, 1925 – December 21, 1980) was an American professional baseball player. The 5 ft 9 in (1.75 m), 150 lb (68 kg) right-handed pitcher appeared in two Major League Baseball games, one for the 1948 Chicago Cubs and one for the 1955 St. Louis Cardinals. He had a 12-year career (1946–1957) in minor league baseball, where he won 97 games and excelled as a relief pitcher in the Triple-A International League during the mid-1950s.

Jacobs' first Major League trial came at the age of 23 when the Cubs recalled him from their Class A Des Moines Bruins affiliate at the end of the 1948 season. In his September 19 debut, he pitched two innings in relief during an 8–1 loss to the Brooklyn Dodgers at Ebbets Field and gave up one run, on a home run to Gene Hermanski; however, he went on to strike out two future Hall of Famers: Roy Campanella and Pee Wee Reese. Six full seasons in the minors then followed. But in 1953 and 1954, Jacobs recorded back-to-back outstanding seasons as a relief pitcher for the Springfield Cubs and Rochester Red Wings, with a composite 25–4 record in 111 appearances over those two campaigns.

He then began the 1955 season with the Cardinals. But in his only appearance, on Opening Day against his old team, the Cubs, at Wrigley Field, Jacobs yielded four runs and six hits (including a home run by Randy Jackson) in two innings pitched in relief of Brooks Lawrence. The Cardinals lost 14–4. Jacobs then spent the rest of his career in the minor leagues. In four MLB innings pitched, he gave up nine hits and five earned runs, walking one and striking out three.

Tony often referred to the politics in baseball as the real reason he had so few opportunities in the major leagues after a brilliant minor league stint.
