= Buddy Hicks =

American baseball player (1927–2014)

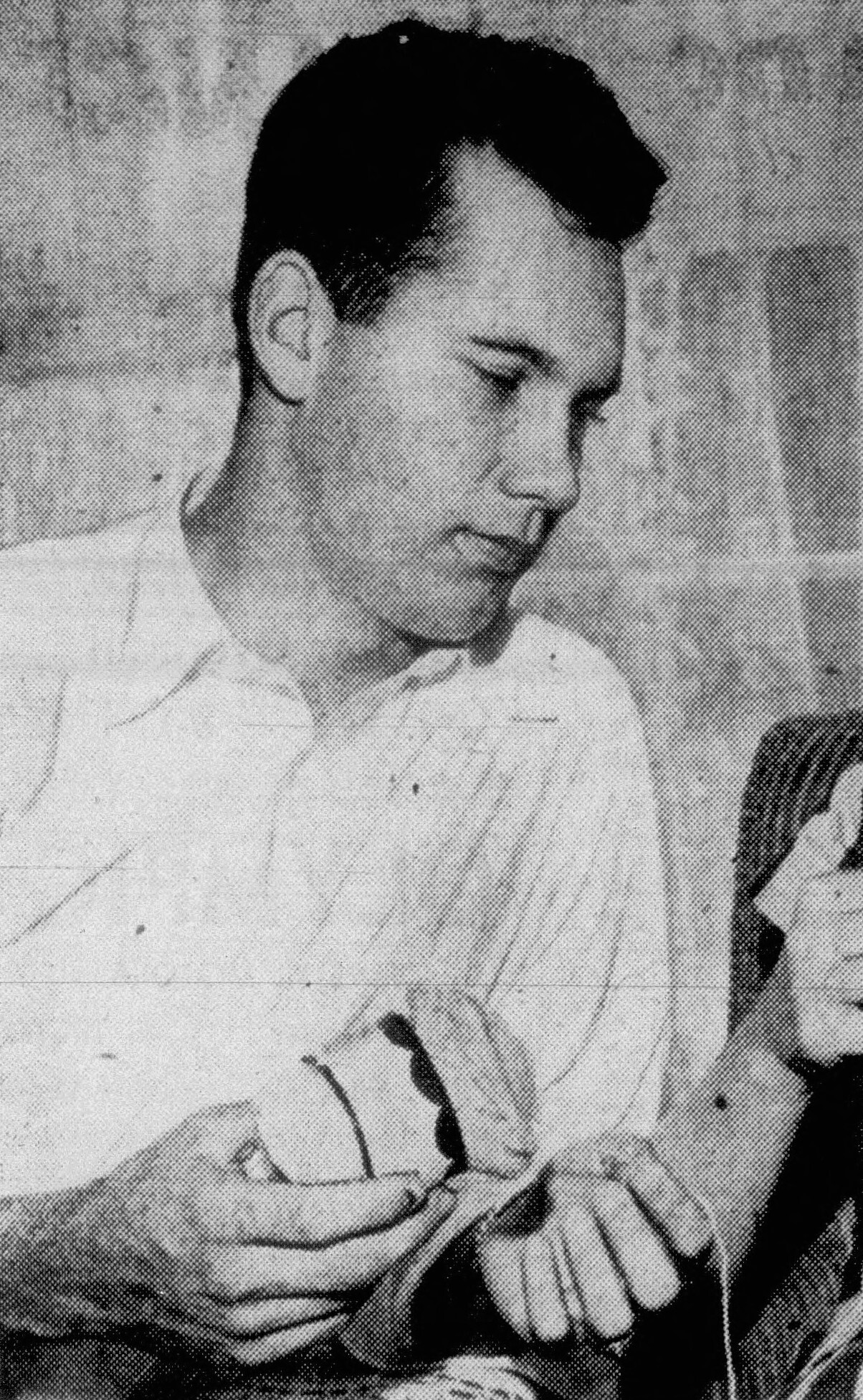
- Hicks in 1950
- Infielder
- Born: February 15, 1927; Belvedere, California, U.S.
- Died: December 8, 2014 (aged 87); St. George, Utah, U.S.
- Batted: Switch Threw: Right

MLB debut
- April 17, 1956, for the Detroit Tigers

Last MLB appearance
- July 18, 1956, for the Detroit Tigers

MLB statistics
- Batting average: .213
- Home runs: 0
- Runs batted in: 5
- Stats at Baseball Reference

Teams
- Detroit Tigers (1956)

Clarence Walter "Buddy" Hicks (February 15, 1927 – December 8, 2014) was an American professional baseball player and manager. Primarily a shortstop during his 17-year active career (1944; 1947–62), he also played third base and first base. Hicks was a switch hitter who threw right-handed, standing 5 feet 10 inches (1.78 m) tall and weighing 170 pounds (77 kg).

Hicks had a 26-game trial with the 1956 Detroit Tigers of Major League Baseball, garnering ten hits in 47 at bats for a .213 batting average, with two doubles and five runs batted in. Defensively, he handled 52 total chances at shortstop and second base without an error for a 1.000 fielding percentage. The rest of his career was spent in minor league baseball, with the Brooklyn Dodgers, Tigers, Boston Braves/Milwaukee Braves and Philadelphia Phillies organizations. In 1,854 minor league games, he batted .273 with 63 home runs.

He spent a decade (1960–69) as a minor league manager, working for the Braves and Washington Senators, including all or parts of three seasons at the Double-A level.
