= René Monteagudo =

Cuban baseball player (1916-1973)

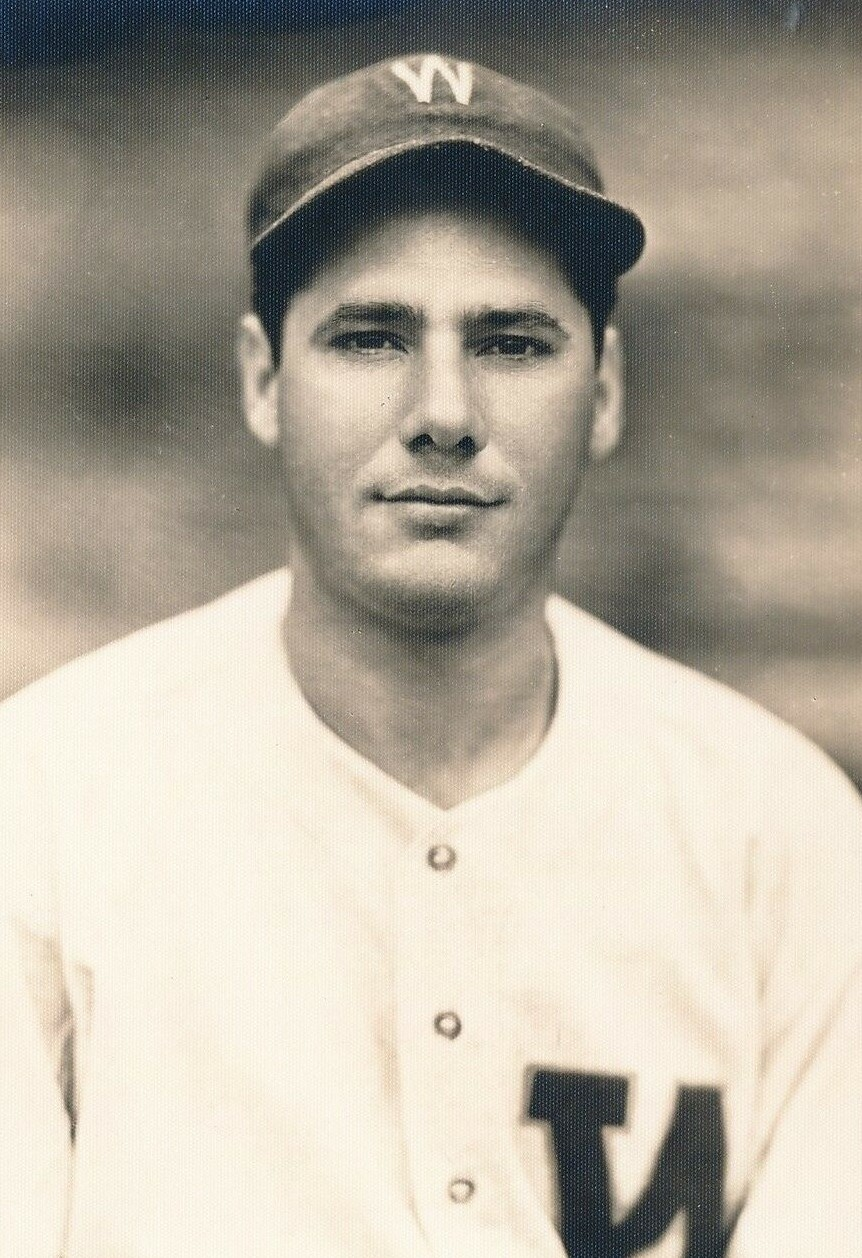
- Pitcher / Outfielder
- Born: March 12, 1916; Havana, Cuba
- Died: September 14, 1973 (aged 57); Hialeah, Florida, U.S.
- Batted: Left Threw: Left

MLB debut
- September 6, 1938, for the Washington Senators

Last MLB appearance
- September 30, 1945, for the Philadelphia Phillies

MLB statistics
- Batting average: .289
- Home runs: 0
- Runs batted in: 21
- Win–loss record: 3–7
- Earned run average: 6.42
- Strikeouts: 93
- Stats at Baseball Reference

Teams
- Washington Senators (1938, 1940, 1944); Philadelphia Phillies (1945)

René Monteagudo Miranda (March 12, 1916 – September 14, 1973) was a Major League Baseball pitcher and outfielder who played with the Washington Senators (1938, 1940, 1944) and Philadelphia Phillies (1945). Monteagudo threw and batted left-handed.

Monteagudo was born in Havana, Cuba. Signed by the Senators, he debuted as a pitcher on September 6, 1938, but bothered by a sore arm, he switched to the outfield. In 1945, for the Phillies, he was the most used and most successful pinch-hitter in the league, going 18-for-52 (.346). He also pitched 14 games in relief. In 1946, Monteagudo was one of the ballplayers blackballed by Commissioner Happy Chandler after leaving the majors to play in the Mexican League.

In a four-season major league career, Monteagudo was a .289 hitter (78-for-270) with 21 RBI, 32 runs, nine doubles, one triple, and two stolen bases in 156 games. As a pitcher, he posted a 3–7 record with 93 strikeouts, a 6.42 ERA, two saves, and 168 innings in 46 games (11 as a starter). René Monteagudo died in Hialeah, Florida at the age of 57.

His son Aurelio Monteagudo was a right-handed screwball pitcher who played in Major League Baseball and Venezuelan Professional Baseball League.

== See also ==
- List of second-generation Major League Baseball players
- List of Major League Baseball players from Cuba
