= Jim Cronin (baseball) =

American baseball player (1905-1983)

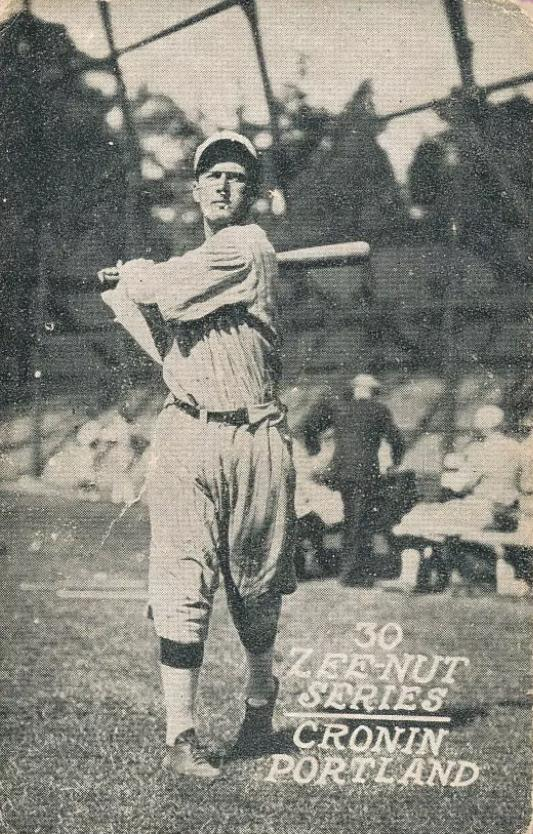
- Second baseman / Shortstop / Third baseman
- Born: August 7, 1905; Richmond, California, US
- Died: June 10, 1983 (aged 77); Concord, California, US
- Batted: Both Threw: Right

MLB debut
- July 4, 1929, for the Philadelphia Athletics

Last MLB appearance
- September 20, 1929, for the Philadelphia Athletics

MLB statistics (through 1929)
- Batting average: .232
- Hits: 13
- Runs batted in: 4
- Stats at Baseball Reference

Teams
- Philadelphia Athletics (1929)

James John Cronin (August 7, 1905 – June 10, 1983) was an American Major League Baseball infielder. He played for the Philadelphia Athletics during the 1929 season.
