= Spider Jorgensen =

American baseball player

- Third baseman
- Born: November 3, 1919; Folsom, California, U.S.
- Died: November 6, 2003 (aged 84); Rancho Cucamonga, California, U.S.
- Batted: Left Threw: Right

MLB debut
- April 15, 1947, for the Brooklyn Dodgers

Last MLB appearance
- June 30, 1951, for the New York Giants

MLB statistics
- Batting average: .266
- Home runs: 9
- Runs batted in: 107
- Stats at Baseball Reference

Teams
- Brooklyn Dodgers (1947–1950); New York Giants (1950–1951)

John Donald "Spider" Jorgensen (November 3, 1919 – November 6, 2003) was an American third baseman in Major League Baseball who played from 1947 through 1951 for the Brooklyn Dodgers (1947–50) and New York Giants (1950–51). Jorgensen made his MLB debut for the Dodgers on April 15, 1947, the same day teammate Jackie Robinson broke the professional baseball color line.

Born in Folsom, California, Jorgensen graduated from Folsom High School in 1936 and attended Sacramento City College from 1937 to 1938. His nickname, Spider, originated from his time at Folsom High School, according to Baseball Digest writer Phil Elderkin. Elderkin wrote in 1998 that Jorgensen wore a pair of black shorts with a vertical orange stripe on the sides while playing basketball, which prompted a teacher to tell the students that Jorgensen reminded him of a black widow spider he killed in a woodshed. The nickname, while random, stuck with Jorgensen.

In 1940, Jorgensen participated in a Brooklyn Dodgers’ tryout camp in San Mateo, California. He impressed scouts Tommy Downey and Bill Svilich so much that, after graduating from Sacramento City College in 1941, he was offered a contract with the Dodgers. At age 21, he was assigned to the Dodgers’ Santa Barbara team in the Class C California League. In his first pro season, Jorgensen appeared in 140 games and batted .332 with nine home runs and 43 doubles, earning the league's Most Valuable Player award and helping Santa Barbara win the league championship.

Two months after Japan's attack on Pearl Harbor, Jorgensen paused his baseball career and enlisted in the U.S. Army. He was assigned to the Army Air Corps, eventually reaching the rank of technical sergeant, while serving at duty stations in Idaho, Arizona, and Texas. While in Texas, Jorgensen met Lenore Jones, whom he married in October 1946. Lenore had two children from a previous marriage, and the couple had a daughter, Jonel. Jorgensen and Lenore were married until her death in 1995.

Discharged from the U.S. Army in 1945, Jorgensen returned to professional baseball with the Montreal Royals, the Dodgers' Class AAA affiliate. While in Montreal, Jorgensen played in the same infield as Jackie Robinson and future Dodgers general manager Al Campanis, who played second base and shortstop, respectively. In 117 games with the Royals, Jorgensen batted .293 and recorded 71 RBIs.

Jorgensen participated in the Dodgers' spring training in Cuba in 1947, but believing he would begin the season with the Royals, Jorgensen sent his glove, bats and spikes to Syracuse, New York, where the Royals would begin the season. However, injuries to infielders Cookie Lavagetto and Arky Vaughan led the Dodgers to keep Jorgensen on the major-league Opening Day roster. Without any of his equipment, Jorgensen was in danger of not playing. Jorgensen's Montreal teammate Robinson, who was also making his debut that day, lent his glove to Jorgensen.

“I came into Ebbets Field on Opening Day, scared to death," Jorgensen later told writer Phil Elderkin. "I didn’t think I was going to play. I didn’t have any equipment with me. My glove, bats, everything else went to Syracuse because the Montreal club opened up there. Then Jackie comes over and says ‘Here, use my second base glove.’ He was going to play first base. So I used his glove and borrowed a pair of spikes and I'm in the lineup. So I really didn't have time to get nervous.”

While his debut was overshadowed by Robinson's, Jorgensen drew a walk and drove in a run in three at-bats. Two days later, on April 17, 1947, Jorgensen had arguably the best game of his career when he recorded a home run and two doubles for six combined RBIs. 1947 would be Jorgensen's only MLB season as a regular, batting .274, drove in 67 runs, with a team-high eight triples. Jorgensen also played in each of the seven games of the 1947 World Series against the New York Yankees, recording four hits and three RBIs.

During the subsequent winter, though, Jorgensen bruised his arm using a hunting rifle. He permanently damaged his arm by throwing too aggressively during spring training, leading his career to quickly decline. Despite manager Leo Durocher telling the media Jorgensen would likely be the starting third baseman in 1948, Billy Cox started at third while Jorgensen became a reserve. Jorgensen batted .300 in 90 at-bats in 1948, but after further tests on his arm and shoulder in June, Jorgensen was left in St. Louis and eventually sent to the Dodgers' American Association farm team in St. Paul, Minnesota. Jorgensen returned to the Dodgers' roster as a reserve in 1949, batting .269 in 134 at-bats. He played in his second World Series in 1949, but only recorded two hits in 11 at-bats.

On May 17, 1950, the Dodgers sold Jorgensen to the New York Giants. He would play only 24 games with the Giants, recording five hits in 37 at-bats. He played 64 games for the Giants' Class AAA Minneapolis Millers, batting .330 in 215 at-bats. Jorgensen would make his final major-league appearance on June 30, 1951, when he flied out as a pinch hitter. The next day, the Giants traded Jorgensen to the Oakland Oaks of the Pacific Coast League. In 267 major-league games, Jorgensen batted .266, hit nine home runs and recorded 107 RBIs. He played with the Oaks until 1955, when the team relocated to Vancouver and became the Vancouver Mounties. He played with the Mounties through the 1958 season, at which time he became a coach.

In 267 games over five seasons, Jorgensen posted a .266 batting average (201-for-755) with 97 runs, 9 home runs, 107 RBI and 106 bases on balls. He recorded a .940 fielding percentage primarily as a third baseman and several games as a right fielder. In 11 World Series games, he batted .194 (6-for-31) with 2 runs and 3 RBI.

After several seasons coaching around the country, Jorgensen returned to his home in Sacramento, where he coached the Fair Oaks American Legion, a team that won the North Division championship in 1967. Dusty Baker, who became a successful major-league player and manager, was a member of that team.

"In all the time he coached us, I never knew Spider played for the Dodgers," Baker said in the 2004 book How To Be Like Jackie Robinson. "I knew he was a terrific coach, but he never once mentioned he was a former player."

For the last 30 years of his life, Jorgensen worked as a major-league scout for the Kansas City Royals, Philadelphia Phillies, and Chicago Cubs, the latter of which he was a scout for more than two decades. At the time of his death, Jorgensen was still scouting locally for the Cubs.

In 1996, Jorgensen was in the first class of inductees into the Sacramento City College Athletic Hall of Fame.

On November 6, 2003, Jorgensen died in a hospital in Rancho Cucamonga, California, just three days after his 84th birthday. He is inurned at Lakeside Memorial Lawn Cemetery in Folsom.

In the film 42, Jorgensen was portrayed by actor Jamie Ruehling.
