= Spook Jacobs =

American baseball player (1925–2011)

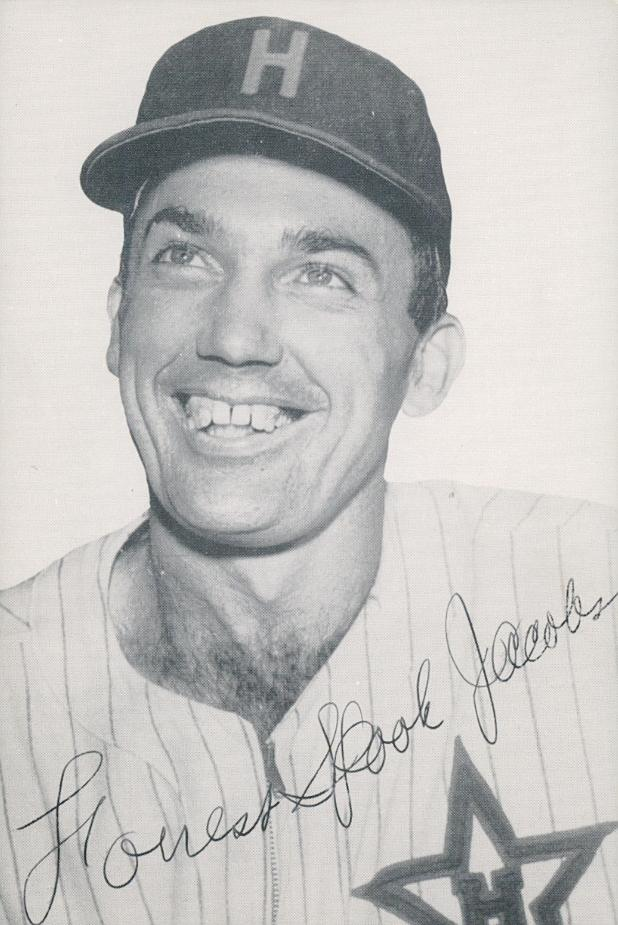
- Jacobs with the Hollywood Stars c. 1957
- Second baseman
- Born: November 4, 1925; Cheswold, Delaware, U.S.
- Died: February 18, 2011 (aged 85); Milford, Delaware, U.S.
- Batted: Right Threw: Right

MLB debut
- April 13, 1954, for the Philadelphia Athletics

Last MLB appearance
- July 3, 1956, for the Pittsburgh Pirates

MLB statistics
- Batting average: .247
- Home runs: 0
- Runs batted in: 33
- Stats at Baseball Reference

Teams
- Philadelphia / Kansas City Athletics (1954–1956); Pittsburgh Pirates (1956)

Forrest Vandergrift Jacobs (November 4, 1925 – February 18, 2011) was an American second baseman in Major League Baseball who played from 1954 through 1956 for the Philadelphia / Kansas City Athletics (1954–56), and Pittsburgh Pirates (1956). Listed at 5 ft 9 in (1.75 m), 155 lb, he batted and threw right-handed. His teammates affectionately called him Spook, a moniker that he used throughout his life.

== Baseball career ==
Born in Cheswold, Delaware, Jacobs graduated from Salem High School, Salem, New Jersey in 1943. Immediately after graduation, Jacobs enlisted in the United States Army where he rose to the rank of sergeant during World War II and was awarded the Asian Pacific Campaign Theatre Medal, the American Campaign Theatre Medal, the United States Army Good Conduct Medal, and the United States Victory Medal.

Following his honorable military discharge, he played professional baseball for 17 seasons for the Brooklyn Dodgers, Philadelphia / Kansas City Athletics and Pittsburgh Pirates organizations, three of them in the majors, while playing for several professional league clubs including the highly competitive Cuban, Panamanian and Puerto Rican winter leagues.

== Winter leagues ==
Jacobs won batting titles in Panama in the 1948–49 and the 1949–50 seasons while also helping Panama to its only Caribbean Series championship by having the game-winning walk-off hit against Puerto Rico for the Carta Vieja Yankees, and again in Cuba during the 1955–1956 season while playing for the Leones de la Habana / Reds.

Jacobs also had the game-winning Cuban championship walk-off hit in 1952–1953 for the Azules de Almandares managed by Bobby Bragan. Because of Jacobs's exploits, he was honored by being elected into the Cuban Baseball Hall of Fame and the Cuban Sports Hall of Fame. To date, he is the only American to receive both prestigious honors.

== Major League Baseball ==
Jacobs posted a .247 average and a .971 fielding percentage in his major league career. He stole 22 bases, 17 of them in 1954. His build reminded some of Nellie Fox.

On April 13, 1954, in his opening day major league debut, he became the only player in major league history to collect four consecutive hits in his first four major league at bats. He is also one of only three players in major league history to go 4-for-4 in their major league debut, the others being Delino DeShields and Willie McCovey.

Jacobs was a slap hitter who reached base by batting balls through the infield, and gained his ghostly nickname from his tendency to dump hits just over the heads of opposing infielders. A baseball writer gave Jacobs the nickname in 1947 when he was playing with the Johnstown, Pennsylvania club, the Johnnies, of the Middle Atlantic League. Casey Stengel once said of him, "He's always been in our hair."

Jacobs was a farmhand of the Brooklyn Dodgers for eight years before becoming the property of the Philadelphia Athletics by being drafted in the winter of 1953 by Connie Mack. The Dodgers had vast minor league holdings in 1954, and loaded a number of their prospects on the roster of a single club. Under the rules of the time, only one selected player could be lost to a team per draft period. Jacobs was never called up to the Dodgers' top farm club, the Canadian Montreal Royals, because of their surplus of players. On one occasion, he was passed over when Brooklyn picked Junior Gilliam. Clyde Sukeforth hinted that the Pittsburgh Pirates might have an interest in drafting Jacobs, but the team chose Danny Lynch instead. Nevertheless, Philadelphia manager Eddie Joost was particularly impressed by Jacobs' fielding and his hit-and-run capability.

On April 20, 1954, Jacobs' fourth-inning triple, followed by an error on a fly ball hit by Vic Power, gave Philadelphia a 5–0 lead over the Washington Senators. On May 3 of that season, Chicago White Sox right-hander Sandalio Consuegra, retired the first 19 Athletics' hitters before Jacobs doubled in the seventh inning with one out. Consuegra retired the next five hitters before getting into trouble in the ninth. Then Jacobs bunted successfully and Consuegra threw wildly into right field, allowing two runs to score. Chicago beat Philadelphia 14–3 at Connie Mack Stadium, with Jacobs collecting the only two hits for the losers.

== Facts ==
During 1956 spring training, Jacobs competed with Jim Finigan for the starting second base job for the Kansas City Athletics. By then, Finigan was considered the stronger hitter, and Jacobs the faster runner. He was optioned to the Hollywood Stars of the Pacific Coast League by the Pittsburgh Pirates on July 4, 1956., but was among 14 players recalled by the Pirates in late September.

He was injured when he collided with teammate shortstop Dick Smith during a Pacific Coast League game. Both were chasing a fly ball in a game against the San Diego Padres (April 11, 1957), and Jacobs was thought to have suffered a hairline skull fracture after being carried from the field on a stretcher. He recovered and returned to the Stars' lineup as early as May 7, however.

Jacobs and Tommy Lasorda were teammates on the 1956 Athletics. While pitching for the Los Angeles Angels (PCL), Lasorda deliberately hit Jacobs in the fifth inning of an August 1957 game at Gilmore Field. The knockdown came after relief pitcher Fred Waters hit a 400-foot home run which broke a 4–4 tie. Jacobs charged Lasorda and then went after his rival second baseman, Sparky Anderson. Finally, Jacobs's Hollywood Stars went on to score seven runs in the fifth inning to gain an 11–4 win.

Jacobs also was involved in a fracas while playing for the Columbus Jets in July 1955. In the fourth inning of an International League game, Lou Limmer of the Toronto Maple Leafs slid into him at second base, knocking him head over heels. He was chased when he threw a punch at him in retaliation. A sore arm led to his demotion to Columbus, but when his arm recovered Jacobs was selected as the outstanding International League second baseman for 1955, batting .316.

== Later life ==
After his baseball career ended, Jacobs and his wife Bobbie settled in Milford, Delaware, where they owned and operated the Milford Bus Center, then Mr. Donut/Donut Connection, over a span of 42 years before retiring.

The Delaware Sports Museum and Hall of Fame inducted Jacobs in 1991. He also became a member of seven Sports Hall of Fames: Delaware Baseball, Columbus, Ohio Baseball, Eastern Shore Baseball, South Jersey, Salem County, New Jersey, and the aforementioned Cuban Baseball and Cuban Sports.

Another of his proudest achievements was when his personal stamp collection titled Mail It Home was featured in 2008 at the Baseball Hall of Fame in Cooperstown, New York.

Jacobs died at the Delaware Hospice Center in Kent County, Milford, Delaware, on February 18, 2011, at the age of 85. He is buried at the Milford, Community Cemetery.
