= Luis Olmo =

Puerto Rican baseball player (1919–2017)

- Utility player
- Born: August 11, 1919; Arecibo, Puerto Rico
- Died: April 28, 2017 (aged 97); Santurce, San Juan, Puerto Rico
- Batted: Right Threw: Right

MLB debut
- July 18, 1943, for the Brooklyn Dodgers

Last MLB appearance
- June 6, 1951, for the Boston Braves

MLB statistics
- Batting average: .281
- Home runs: 29
- Runs batted in: 272
- Stats at Baseball Reference

Teams
- Brooklyn Dodgers (1943–1945, 1949); Boston Braves (1950–1951)

Career highlights and awards
- In 1945, he led the NL with 13 triples.

Member of the Caribbean

Baseball Hall of Fame
- Induction: 2004

Luis Francisco Rodríguez Olmo (August 11, 1919 – April 28, 2017) was a Puerto Rican Major League Baseball outfielder and right-handed batter. Olmo played in the majors with the Brooklyn Dodgers (1943–1945, 1949) and Boston Braves (1950–51). Olmo was both the first Puerto Rican to play and to hit a home run in the World Series. Known as "El Pelotero de América", Olmo also played in Cuba, the Dominican Republic, Venezuela and Mexico.

== Early years ==
Olmo was born in Arecibo, Puerto Rico. He began his professional career in 1938 with the Criollos de Caguas of the Puerto Rican Winter League. He co-won the MVP with Francisco Coimbre in 1942–43, after leading in doubles. In 1939, Olmo signed with the Richmond Colts of the Piedmont League and was assigned to the Tarboro Goobers and later the Wilson Tobs of the Coastal Plain League. In 1940–41, Luis Olmos established a LBPPR record with ten triples. The Dodgers acquired Olmo from Richmond in 1942 and assigned him to the Montreal Royals after spring training. He won the LBPPR home run title in 1942–43 and 1944–45. Olmo also served as a player-manager for Santurce and Caguas, winning a title with the Criollos.

== MLB career ==
Brooklyn called Olmo up to the major leagues in July 1943 and he debuted with the Dodgers on July 18, 1943. In 57 games, he batted .303 with four home runs and 37 RBI. He gained regular status in the next season, batting .258 with nine home runs and 85 RBI in 136 games.

On May 18, 1945, Olmo became the second player (Del Bissonette on April 21, 1930, was the first) in Major League history to hit a bases-loaded triple and a bases-loaded home run (grand slam) in the same game. He added a single for good measure, only failing to hit a double to complete the cycle. In that season, he led the league in triples (13) and reached career-high numbers in batting average (.313), home runs (10), RBI (110), doubles (27), stolen bases (15) and games (141).

=== Mexican League ===
Despite his strong 1945 season, the return of players from World War II service meant stiff competition for the Dodgers' outfield. Olmo was offered a $6,000 salary for 1946, far from his expectations of a $10,000 contract. Instead, he chose to sign with the Rojos del México in the Mexican League, after owner Jorge Pasquel offered him a $20,000 salary; he was later traded to the Azules de Veracruz (also owned by Pasquel). In 59 games with Mexico and Veracruz in the 1946 season, Olmo hit .289 and drove in 42 runs. In the LBPPR, he led the season in triples with 13.

Olmo, along with the other so-called "jumpers" who defected to the Mexican League, were suspended for five years by Commissioner of Baseball Happy Chandler; some historians suggest that the departure of a relatively-high-profile player like Olmo was the catalyst for Chandler's crackdown. Along with fellow "jumper" and former Dodger Mickey Owen, Olmo applied for reinstatement in 1946 but was denied. Instead, he played the 1947 season with Veracruz, hitting .301 in 102 games.

By 1949, Olmo was reinstated and he returned to the Dodgers, batting .305 in 1949 to help win the pennant.

=== Return to the majors ===
In the 1949 World Series against the Yankees, Olmo became the first Puerto Rican to play in a World Series, as well as hit a home run and get three hits in a Series game. After two seasons, he was dealt to the Braves. He retired at the end of the 1951 season.

In a six-year career, Olmo batted .281 (458-for-1629) with 29 home runs, 208 runs, 65 doubles, 25 triples, and 33 stolen bases in 462 games.

=== Caribbean Series ===
Olmo earned Caribbean Series MVP honors, during the 1951 edition played in Caracas, after batting .416 and three homers, while powering the Cangrejeros de Santurce to the championship.

Olmo returned to the Series with Santurce in its 1955 title, and also played as a reinforcement for fourth-place Senadores de San Juan in 1952. Overall, Olmo posted a .303 average with three home runs and 13 RBI in three Caribbean Series.

== Later years ==
After retiring, Olmo became a full time manager for the Lobos and the Senadores, for which he was selected manager if the year six times.

In 1987, Olmo was inducted into the Puerto Rico Sports Hall of Fame. He is also a member of regional the halls of Caguas, Arecibo and Brooklyn, and the Puerto Rican Baseball Hall of Fame. In 1999, Olmo was included in the LBPPR's 20th century team. Olmo was elected to the Caribbean Baseball Hall of Fame on February 6, 2004. His baseball career was featured in a 2008 American documentary titled "Beisbol", directed by Alan Swyer and narrated by Esai Morales, which covered the early influences and contributions of Hispanics in the game. The City of Arecibo honored Olmo by naming a stadium after him.

Olmo, who had been suffering from Alzheimer's disease for more than a year, and also was suffering from the complications of double pneumonia, died on April 28, 2017, in Santurce, San Juan, Puerto Rico.

== See also ==
- List of Major League Baseball annual triples leaders
- Sports in Puerto Rico
- List of Puerto Ricans
