= Luis Arroyo =

Puerto Rican baseball player (1927–2016)

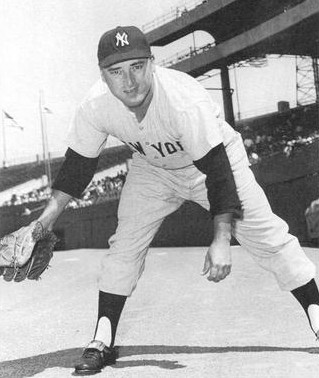
- Pitcher
- Born: February 18, 1927; Peñuelas, Puerto Rico
- Died: January 13, 2016 (aged 88); Ponce, Puerto Rico
- Batted: Left Threw: Left

MLB debut
- April 20, 1955, for the St. Louis Cardinals

Last MLB appearance
- May 28, 1963, for the New York Yankees

MLB statistics
- Win–loss record: 40–32
- Earned run average: 3.93
- Strikeouts: 336
- Stats at Baseball Reference

Teams
- St. Louis Cardinals (1955); Pittsburgh Pirates (1956–1957); Cincinnati Reds (1959); New York Yankees (1960–1963)

Career highlights and awards
- 2× All-Star (1955, 1961²); 2× World Series champion (1961, 1962); AL saves champion (1961)

Luis Enrique "Tite" Arroyo, (February 18, 1927 – January 13, 2016) was a Puerto Rican Major League Baseball pitcher from 1955 to 1963. Arroyo was the first Puerto Rican player to appear for the New York Yankees and was a key part of their pennant winning seasons in 1961 and 1962. In 1955, Arroyo and Vic Power became the first Puerto Ricans to be selected to MLB's All-Star Game.

== Baseball career ==
Arroyo, from Peñuelas, Puerto Rico, was signed by Ponce to play in the Liga de Beisbol Profesional de Puerto Rico in 1946. In 1955, Arroyo was sent to the Senadores de San Juan. In 1956-57, he led the LBPPR in strikeouts. Arroyo was the LBPPR ERA leader and MVP in 1960-61. He retired with 110 wins in the LBPPR. In the Caribbean Series, Arroyo gathered a 3-0 record and an ERA of 2.30, competing in four events. In the Dominican Republic, he played for Escogido.

Aroyo made his MLB debut on April 20, 1955. A stocky left-hander, he spent one season primarily as a starter with the St. Louis Cardinals. Though he was a member of the National League All-Star team that year, he was traded to the Pittsburgh Pirates the next spring, where he was moved to the bullpen. Struggling to establish himself in the role, he went from the Pirates to the Cincinnati Redlegs, then the New York Yankees. Arroyo was the first to play for the Yankees, and despite his earlier struggles, he quickly became an important contributor to the club.

American League hitters had little success against Arroyo's screwball, and after a solid contribution at the back of their bullpen in 1960, he enjoyed the best season of his career in 1961. That year, Arroyo pitched 119 innings with a 2.19 ERA, while winning 15 games as the team's relief ace. His totals of 65 games pitched and 29 saves both led the league; he surrendered only five home runs in a season where league-wide offensive totals were very high by historical standards and was named to his second All-Star team while finishing sixth in AL MVP voting. He was named the Sporting News Reliever of the Year in 1961, for the American League.

Arroyo's glory was, however, short-lived. He injured his arm the following spring; while he pitched for two more seasons, he never regained his prior effectiveness. Arroyo retired after appearing in only six innings in the 1963 season. Over the course of his MLB career, he pitched 531 1/3 innings with a 3.93 ERA, collecting 40 wins, 32 losses, and 44 saves.

Following his retirement as a player, Arroyo became a scout and pitching coach for the Yankees.

== Later life and death ==
In 1977, Arroyo was inducted into the Puerto Rico Sports Hall of Fame. He has also been inducted into the Puerto Rican Baseball Hall of Fame (1992) and the Caribbean Series Hall of Fame (2002). In 1999, the LBPPR included him in the 20th century team.

On July 16, 2010, Arroyo was hospitalized after suffering a "mild heart attack"; he fell ill at an event leading up to the Yankees' July 17 Old-Timers' Day celebration, an annual event where Arroyo was a popular figure.

Arroyo died on January 13, 2016, in Ponce, Puerto Rico. The Yankees announced his death saying that Arroyo's daughter said he had been diagnosed with cancer in December 2015.

== See also ==
- List of Major League Baseball players from Puerto Rico
- List of Major League Baseball annual saves leaders
