= Serie Monumental =

International baseball tournament held in 1946

Tournament details
- Country: Venezuela
- Cities: Caracas and Maracaibo
- Venue(s): Estadio Cerveza Caracas; Estadio Olímpico de Maracaibo
- Dates: November 24, 1945 – January 1, 1946
- Teams: 4

The Serie Monumental (English: Monumental Series) was an international club baseball tournament held in Venezuela in late 1945–46. It saw a team of all-stars from the American Negro leagues play their opposites in the Venezuelan League. The series, played only once, was the immediate precursor to the 1946–50 Interamerican Series (and is sometimes considered the first of those contests), and by extension, to the modern Caribbean Series.

Although the Major League Baseball color barrier had not yet been broken in 1945, the Negro league all-stars (dubbed the Estrellas Negras) included several future Hall of Famers, including Jackie Robinson and Roy Campanella. The Americans first played several exhibition games in Caracas against the Cerveceria Caracas club (calling themselves the Criollo All-Stars), which included active major-leaguer Alex Carrasquel; and another team (the "Caribbean All-Stars", with an international roster). The North American team finished with a 7–2 record, with Cerveceria/Criollos at 3–4–1 and the Caribbean All-Stars at 2–5–1. The Negro leaguers then traveled to Maracaibo to play an all-star team from Zulia State, headlined by Luis Aparicio Sr.

The series came in the wake of Venezuela hosting the 1944 and 1945 Amateur World Series. The tournament was a commercial success, and an impetus for the professionalization of the baseball in Venezuela; the Venezuelan Professional Baseball League opened its first season in early January 1946, with Venezuelan teams contracting several Black players from the tour. Sabios de Vargas reportedly tried to hire Jackie Robinson, who hit .339 in the series with a home run and five RBIs, but either he or the Brooklyn Dodgers (who had recently signed him) declined.

== Participants ==
- (United States) Negro All-Stars (Spanish: Estrellas Negras or Estrellas Norteamericanas, managed by Felton Snow)
- (Venezuela) Criollo All-Stars (Spanish: Estrellas Criollanas, managed by José Antonio Casanova)
- (Venezuela) Caribbean All-Stars (Spanish: Estrellas del Caribe, managed by Chino Canónico)
- (Venezuela) Zulia All-Stars (Spanish: Estrellas Zulianas)

== Rosters ==
Keys

- **Bold** denotes a player inducted into the National Baseball Hall of Fame
- ^{†} denotes a player inducted into the Venezuelan Baseball Hall of Fame

=== Negro All-Stars ===
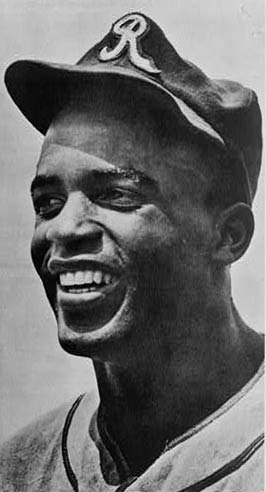
Jackie Robinson in 1945

Managed by Felton Snow of the Baltimore Elite Giants, the Negro All-Stars were composed of players from the Negro National League and Negro American League:

Pos.	Player	Team
C	Quincy Trouppe	Cleveland Buckeyes (NAL)
1B	**Buck Leonard**	Homestead Grays (NNL)
2B	Marvin Barker	New York Black Yankees (NNL)
3B	Parnell Woods	Cleveland Buckeyes (NAL)
SS	**Jackie Robinson**	Kansas City Monarchs (NAL)
OF	Gene Benson	Philadelphia Stars (NNL)
OF	Sam Jethroe	Cleveland Buckeyes (NAL)
C/OF	**Roy Campanella**	Baltimore Elite Giants (NNL)
P	Bill Anderson	New York Cubans (NNL)
P	George Jefferson	Cleveland Buckeyes (NAL)
P	Verdell Mathis	Memphis Red Sox (NAL)
P	Roy Welmaker	Homestead Grays (NNL)

=== Criollo All-Stars ===
Manager: (Venezuela) José Antonio Casanova^{†}

- (Venezuela) Enrique Fonseca (C)
- (Venezuela) Antonio Briñez (1B)
- (Venezuela) Dalmiro Finol^{†} (2B)
- (Venezuela) Luis Romero Petit (3B)
- (Venezuela) Eduardo Pérez (SS)
- (Venezuela) Guillermo Vento (OF)
- (Venezuela) Héctor Benítez^{†} (OF)
- (Venezuela) Félix Machado (OF)
- (Venezuela) Alejandro Carrasquel^{†} (P)
- (Venezuela) Luis Zuloaga (P)
- (Venezuela) Valentín Arévalo (P)
- (Venezuela) Julio Bracho (P)
- (Venezuela) Ramón Fernández (P)

=== Caribbean All-Stars ===
Manager: (Venezuela) Daniel "Chino" Canónico

- (Venezuela) Cesar Núñez (C)
- (Venezuela) Carlos Ascanio^{†} (1B)
- (United States) Marvin Williams (2B)
- (Panama) Gil Garrido (3B)
- (Panama) Frank Austin (SS)
- (Venezuela) Venancio Osorio (OF)
- (Venezuela) Francisco Contreras (OF)
- (Dominican Republic) Juan Delfino García (OF)
- (Venezuela) Luis Oliveros (P)
- (Venezuela) Domingo Barboza (P)
- (United States) Bill Jefferson (P)
- (Venezuela) Andrés Alonso (P)
- (Venezuela) Balbino Fuenmayor (P)

The Zulia All-Stars were composed of Zulia-born players from both of the other Venezuelan teams, with the notable addition of Luis Aparicio Sr. The Zulia team also included Americans Bill Jefferson and Marvin Williams, who had traveled with the Negro All-Stars and played with the Caribbean team, and Panamanian Frank Austin.

== Bibliography ==
- Javier González; Carlos Figueroa Ruiz. Campos de Gloria: El beisbol en Venezuela, 127 años de historia 1895–2022 (PDF) (in Spanish). Biblioteca Digital Banesco.
- Javier González; Carlos Figueroa Ruiz. El Vuelo de Las Águilas: 52 Anos en la LVBP (PDF) (in Spanish). Biblioteca Digital Banesco.
