= Ramón Fernández (baseball) =

Venezuelan baseball player (1920-1979)

- Pitcher / outfielder
- Born: November 5, 1920; Maracaibo, Zulia, Venezuela
- Died: April 13, 1979 (aged 58); Maracaibo, Zulia, Venezuela
- Batted: Left Threw: Left

Member of the Venezuelan

Baseball Hall of Fame
- Induction: 2006 (as part of 1941 AWS team)
Medals
Men's baseball
Representing Venezuela
Amateur World Series
Gold medal – first place	1941 Havana	Team
Gold medal – first place	1944 Caracas	Team
Gold medal – first place	1945 Caracas	Team
Bronze medal – third place	1942 Havana	Team

Ramón Fernández (November 5, 1920 — April 13, 1979), nicknamed "Dumbo", was a Venezuelan baseball player. Considered a two-way player who excelled as both pitcher and outfielder, he played with the Venezuela national baseball team during a stretch where the country won three Amateur World Series titles, including the historic 1941 championship. He later played in the Venezuelan Professional Baseball League (LVBP).

== Career ==
"Dumbo" Fernández first played with the Venezuela national baseball team at the 1940 Amateur World Series. He also played with Venezuela in 1941, 1944, and 1945. At the 1945 tournament, he posted a .457 batting average, with 21 hits in 46 at bats over Venezuela's 10 games; he was only eclipsed in batting average by teammate Héctor Benítez, who took home Most Valuable Player honors; he also led the tournament in hits, with 21, setting a new AWS record.

Fernández played with the Gavilanes de Maracaibo in the 1940–41 amateur circuit in Zulia State, alongside Tarzán Contreras, Dalmiro Finol, and the Aparicio brothers, Ernesto and Luis. He joined the Cervecería Princesa club in 1941, after owner Jesús Corao moved the team from Maiquetía to Caracas, renaming the club Cerveceria Caracas (the future Leones del Caracas); he started the first game the team played in Caracas, a 7-3 victory at Estadio San Agustín. For the 1945 season, he moved to the Pastora club. Later that year, he participated in the Serie Monumental, a series of exhibition games against Negro league all stars including Jackie Robinson and Roy Campanella.

He turned professional with the Navegantes del Magallanes, in the second season of the Venezuelan Professional Baseball League, where his offensive numbers included a .329 average and 5 home runs in 1946–47. That would be the best offensive year of his pro career. Returning to Cerveceria Caracas, he participated in the first Caribbean Series tournament in 1949. Later that year, he signed with the Havana Cubans of the Florida International League, hitting .272 and pitching to a 3.52 earned run average; in addition to 11 games as a pitcher, he played 30 games in the outfield and 17 games at first base.

He also played with the Sabios de Vargas, as well as in the Dominican Republic and Puerto Rico. In LIDOM, he played with Tigres del Licey in the 1951 season.

Over seven professional winter league seasons, Fernández posted a .279 career batting average with 18 home runs and 11 runs batted in. On the mound, he posted a career earned run average of 4.92 and a 15–13 win–loss record, with his best pitching seasons coming with Caracas in 1947–48 (going 7–4 for a 3.88 ERA) and in 1949–50 (7–2 with a 3.19 ERA).

== Post-playing career ==
After retiring as a player, Fernández coached amateur ball in Venezuela's Double-A league, where he mentored Teodoro Obregon. His son, Jesús Fernández, also played on the national baseball team.

In 2023, Fernández was inducted in the Zulia Baseball Hall of Fame, along with 1941 teammate Enrique Fonseca, as well as Manny Trillo.
