= Enrique Fonseca =

Venezuelan baseball player (1918-2020)

- Catcher
- Born: September 18, 1918; Maracaibo, Zulia, Venezuela
- Died: December 10, 2020 (aged 102); Guarenas, Miranda, Venezuela
- Batted: Right Threw: Right

Member of the Venezuelan

Baseball Hall of Fame
- Induction: 2006 (as part of 1941 AWS team)
Medals
Men's baseball
Representing Venezuela
Amateur World Series
Gold medal – first place	1941 Havana	Team
Gold medal – first place	1944 Caracas	Team
Gold medal – first place	1945 Caracas	Team
Bronze medal – third place	1942 Havana	Team

Moisés Enrique León Fonseca (September 18, 1918 — December 10, 2020) was a Venezuelan baseball player. Nicknamed "Conejo" ("Rabbit"), he played with the Venezuela national baseball team, as well as several seasons with Cervecería Caracas / Leones del Caracas in the Venezuelan Professional Baseball League (LVBP).

== Career ==
Fonseca, along with Luis Romero Petit, debuted with the Escogido club of the Zulian amateur circuit in 1936, in a game against Centauros. Though his paternal last name was León, he elected to go by Fonseca, as he felt it sounded "more Zuliano."

He played third base and outfield for various teams in his native Maracaibo, until he took over the catcher position with the Puma team, with which he won several titles as batting champion. "Conejo" Fonseca also played with Centauros and with Gavilanes de Maracaibo, competing in the Zulia championships until 1940. In 1941, he played with the Vencedor club from Valencia, Carabobo, and later played with Vargas club in the Caracas first division baseball championship.

Fonseca was named one of the two catchers, along with Guillermo Vento for the Venezuelan national team that would play at the 1941 Amateur World Series in Havana. He finished the pre-selection games as the batting champion and best catcher, was among the first selected for the national team. Fonseca served as the backstop for Daniel Canónico, catching all five of "Chino"'s victories in the tournament. That included the tie-breaking championship game against heavily-favored Cuba, which saw Fonseca and Canonico face-off against the battery of Conrado Marrero and Andres Fleitas. Venezuela won the game in upset fashion to earn its first world championship. Fonseca and the rest of the Venezuelan team were feted in their native country as the "Heroes of '41" (Heroes del '41).

He appeared in two more championship squads for Venezuela, in the 1944 and 1945 Amateur World Series. In the 1945 series, he was among the best hitters in the tournament, with a .395 batting average.

"Conejo" Fonseca was the starting catcher for Cervecería Caracas from 1943 to 1950. Along with Vidal López. Luis Zuloaga, and José Antonio Casanova, he was one of the players who contributed to the club's first pennant victory in 1943. After the first division circuit went professional in 1946, he hit his only LVBP home run in the first professional game between Caracas and Magallanes on January 24, 1946, a four-run shot that secured the team's 7-6 victory. He also appeared in exhibition tournaments against Negro league baseball all-stars (the Serie Monumental) as well as against the New York Yankees. Conejo Fonseca was part of the Cervecería squad, composed entirely of Venezuelans, at the inaugural 1949 Caribbean Series.

Fonseca retired from professional baseball in 1953. Over his professional career, he batted .210, appeared in 183 regular-season games in seven seasons with Caracas.

After his playing career, he worked as a school teacher and bus driver. At the time of his death, he was the last living member of the 1941 Amateur World Series team.
