= Héctor Benítez =

Venezuelan baseball player (1918–2011)

- Center fielder
- Born: November 1, 1918; Caracas, Venezuela
- Died: June 17, 2011 (aged 92); Caracas, Venezuela
- Batted: Left Threw: Left

Teams
- Cervecería Caracas (1946–1951); Lácteos de Pastora (1950); Patriotas de Venezuela (1951–1953; 1954–55); Leones del Caracas (1953–54); Navegantes del Magallanes (1953–54); Licoreros de Pampero (1955–1957)

Career highlights and awards
- Amateur World Series MVP (1945); Caribbean Series All-Star (1952)

Member of the Venezuelan

Baseball Hall of Fame
- Induction: 2006 (as part of 1941 AWS team); 2008 (individual)
Medals
Representing Venezuela
Men's baseball
Baseball World Cup
Gold medal – first place	1941 Havana	Team
Gold medal – first place	1945 Caracas	Team

Héctor Benítez Paiva (November 1, 1918 – June 17, 2011), nicknamed Redondo, was a Venezuelan professional baseball player. Listed at 5' 7" (1.73 m), 160 lb. (73 k), he batted and threw left handed.

Born in Caracas, Benítez spent 21 years in Venezuelan baseball, playing in three different leagues as well as for his national team in international tournaments. A solid line-drive hitter and an aggressive base runner, he excelled as a speedy center fielder with a strong arm who gained notoriety for his spectacular diving and shoestring catches.

A Most Valuable Player and Venezuelan Hall of Famer, he was the first ballplayer born in Venezuela to make a Caribbean Series All-Star Team and also became the first to ever hit three home runs in a single game in Venezuelan baseball history.

Redondo, as he was dubbed by teammates and fans alike, made his professional debut in the First Division of Baseball of Venezuela, playing for five teams in eight seasons spanning 1938–1945. He then moved to the Cervecería Caracas club in 1946, to become a founding member of the Venezuelan Professional Baseball League in its inaugural season.

== Early career and international play ==
The 18-year-old Benítez gained international exposure with the Venezuela national baseball team in the 1938 Central American and Caribbean Games held in Panama City, being used as a pitcher and cleanup hitter. But for much of the next decade, he was a valuable addition to the Venezuelan squad during the 1941 and 1945 Baseball World Cup tournaments, where he helped his team to win Gold medal at both championships, usually batting third in the order.

The 1941 BWC featured a nine-team tournament, which was held at the old Tropical Stadium in Havana, Cuba. The representing clubs of Cuba and Venezuela clubs finished tied with an identical record of 7–1, and were forced to play a tie breaking game to determine the championship.

In this one, Daniel Canónico won a pitching duel over Conrado Marrero in front of a crowd of more than 30,000 spectators, as the Venezuelan baseball team captured its first international title with a 3–1 victory over Cuba. A three-run rally in the first inning was enough of a cushion for Canónico, especially being backed by Benítez, who drew a significant walk to put two men on with one out and scored on a two-run RBI-double by Chucho Ramos. The third run came after an error on the outfield. Benítez also collected at least one hit in each of the nine games, scoring six runs with four runs batted in, while leading all hitters with three triples.

But Benítez was much better in the 1945 BWC, when he claimed the batting crown with a mark of .526 (20-for-38), leading also the tournament in hits, runs scored (16) and RBI (16), to earn Most Valuable Player honors. The host Venezuelan team finished undefeated with a perfect 10–0 record, winning its second consecutive gold medal and third overall, largely thanks to the batting of Benítez and the pitching of Luis Zuloaga, who went 4–0, also setting an all-time mark for most consecutive win decisions with his 7–0 undefeated streak at the event.

== Professional career ==
In 1946, Benítez posted a .263 average and slugged .394 for the Cerveceria Caracas club of the newly formed Venezuelan League. He collected 26 hits in 99 at-bats, including 20 runs, seven doubles, four triples, four home runs and five stolen bases in 28 games, while ending fourth in RBI (13) behind teammates Chico Carrasquel (25), Dalmiro Finol (24) and Guillermo Vento (21).

He raised his average to .302 in the 1946–47 season, following with a .340 mark and a .509 slugging percentage in 1947–48. This time, Vidal López won the batting title with a .374 average, while Benítez finished sixth behind Luke Easter (.341) and above Roy Campanella (.336). In between, Benítez set a league record with five runs scored in a single game on November 30, 1947, a record which has been matched by only 11 players since then.

But he had to dealt with some injuries in 1948–49, batting .258 (16-for-62) while appearing in just 20 games. Benítez resurfaced in the 1949–50 season, when he hit a solid .316 average (49-for-155) and slugged .458 in 44 games for Cervecería, adding 10 doubles, four homers, 30 runs, and a career-high 25 RBI. Besides, his .316 average was the best of his team and seventh overall in the league.

During the offseason, he played summer baseball for the Lácteos de Pastora of the neighbor Zulian League. This led to one of the most memorable moments of his career, when he belted three home runs on June 20, 1950, to become the first player to hit three home runs in a single game played in Venezuela. That feat would be matched by Navegantes del Magallanes outfielder Bill Taylor, who hit three homers in a game against the Leones del Caracas during the 1953–54 Venezuelan Professional Baseball League season, which also set a record in the league. In addition, Benítez went 5-for-5 in his career game, including two doubles, and later won the regular-season batting title with an astronomical .430 average.

Back to the winter season, Benítez hit .286 and slugged .395 for Cervecería in 1950–51. He also reached 25 RBI for a second consecutive campaign, and set personal records with 41 runs, five home runs and 12 stolen bases, ending second in the league in steals and sixth in runs. At the end of the season he was transferred to the Patriotas de Venezuela.

== Caribbean Series ==
Then, in 1951–52 Benítez led the Patriotas with a .327 average, which was the third highest in the league, being surpassed only by Wilmer Fields (.348) and Luis Camaleón García (.336). He later played as a reinforcement for his former Cervecería team, when it won the league title and advanced to the 1952 Caribbean Series. In Game 2 of the Series, Benítez hit an RBI single in the top of the 11th inning, to give his team a 2–1 victory over the Carta Vieja Yankees of Panama. During the tournament, he made several catches that probably should have gone for extra base hits, including one over the shoulder grab to rob Joe Tuminelli of a hit and keep it a one-run at aforementioned game. Overall, Benítez hit .286 (6-for-21) and posted a .375 on-base percentage in the Series. He then was named center fielder in the All-Star team, alongside teammate right fielder Wilmer Fields and Leones de la Habana left fielder Sandy Amorós.

== Late career ==
After that, Benítez saw limited action because of nagging injuries. He hit .250 (17-for-68) in 22 games with the Patriotas in 1952–53. The next season, he was assigned to the Leones del Caracas and brought his average up to .362 (21-for-58) in 20 games, before joining the Navegantes del Magallanes during the midseason, hitting for them a paltry .208 (5-for-24) in just 24 games.

Late in his career he had to deal with old injuries, being limited to a pinch-hitting role, and eventually played decent defense in the outfield corners. During his second stint with the Patriotas in 1954–55, he collected 17 hits in 68 trips for a .243 average in only 24 games, but contributed successfully in clutch situations with one homer, a double and 12 RBI. He stayed with the franchise when it was renamed the Licoreros de Pampero in the next season. He appeared in 26 games, averaging .200 (9-for-45) with four doubles, one triple, four runs and five RBI.

In 1956–57, the 38-year-old veteran turned in a quality effort during his final season in the league, as he averaged .345 (30-for-87) and slugged .402 in 37 games for Pampero, including two doubles, four runs and 11 RBI, as well as his last home run and last stolen base.

After his playing days, he spent much of his time coaching and scouting for several teams.

== Honors ==
Héctor Benítez, along with his former teammates of the 1941 Baseball World Champion team, received their long overdue recognition when the Venezuelan Baseball Hall of Fame and Museum enshrined the entire team in 2006. He was inducted individually as well in 2008, as part of the VBHFM sixth class.

Benítez died in Caracas in 2011 at the age of 92, after a long battle with cancer. At the time of his death, he was the fourth oldest survivor of the 1941 champion team.

== Batting statistics ==
Some career statistics are incomplete because there are no records available at the time of the request.

Years	League	GP	AB	R	H	2B	3B	HR	RBI	SB	TB	BB	SO	BA	OBP	SLG	OPS	Ref
1946–1957	VPBL	419	1228	195	366	57	8	21	168	37	502			.298		.409		
1952	Caribbean Series	6	21	0	6	0	0	0	1	1	6	3	1	.286	.375	.286	.661	
