= Francisco Contreras (baseball) =

Venezuelan baseball player (1922-1978)

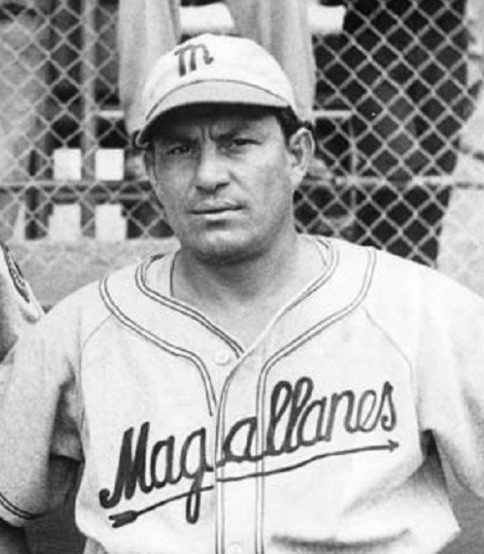
- Catcher / outfielder
- Born: August 20, 1922; Maracaibo, Zulia, Venezuela
- Died: May 11, 1978 (aged 55); Maracaibo, Zulia, Venezuela

Member of the Venezuelan

Baseball Hall of Fame
- Induction: 2006 (as part of 1941 AWS team)
Medals
Men's baseball
Representing Venezuela
Amateur World Series
| Gold medal – first place | 1941 Havana | Team |

Francisco de la Trinidad Contreras (August 20, 1922 — May 11, 1978) was a Venezuelan baseball player. Nicknamed "Tarzán" (after the fictional character), he was a member of the Venezuela national baseball team that won the 1941 Amateur World Series. He also played several seasons in the Venezuelan Professional Baseball League (LVBP), mainly with the Sabios de Vargas.

== Career ==
Born in Maracaibo, played amateur baseball with several different youth teams in Zulia, earning his nickname from his strength and agility on the field, reminiscent of the Edgar Rice Burroughs character. He played with various clubs, including Campo Rojo, Lehólico, Lactuario Zulia, and Ondas del Lago.

Contreras was named to the Venezuelan national team that played at the 1941 Amateur World Series in Havana. Though primarily a catcher by training, he was also used as an outfielder during the tournament, due to the presence of Enrique Fonseca and Guillermo Vento on the roster. He was notably left off the roster for the final championship game against Cuba, which Venezuela won, after being suspended by manager Manuel Malpica for disciplinary reasons.

Contreras was declared a professional baseball player in 1942 after playing in Panama. He played with Pastora in the Zulia circuit in 1945. In the inaugural season of the professional league in Venezuela in 1946, he played with Sabios de Vargas, taking over catching duties from Roy Campanella after he left for spring training with the Brooklyn Dodgers. (Note: He was also listed as an outfielder for Vargas.) Notably, his eighth inning home run in a 9-8 victory over Magallanes won Sabios the first night game in LVBP history. Contreras finished with a .356 batting average (37-for-104), the fourth best average of the season. He went on to play for Magallanes and Patriotas de Venezuela, hitting over .300 in five different seasons, with Vargas and Magallanes.

Contreras also played with the short-lived Zulian professional league in May 1946 with Centauros de Maracaibo. With Espadón in the Venezuelan Western League (successor to the Zulia league), Contreras won the batting championship in 1954–55 season, hitting for a .359 average. He reportedly received Major League Baseball offers from the Washington Senators and St. Louis Cardinals, but declined. He ended his playing career with Centauros in the 1956–57 season, after his playing career was derailed y injury and alcoholism.

Contreras died of a heart attack in his native Maracaibo on May 11, 1978. (Note: The Venezuelan Baseball Hall of Fame and Museum lists his place of death as Caracas.) He was inducted into the Zulia Baseball Hall of Fame in 2020.
