= José Antonio Casanova =

Venezuelan baseball player (1918-1999)

- Shortstop / Manager
- Born: February 18, 1918; Maracaibo, Zulia, Venezuela
- Died: July 8, 1999 (aged 81); Maracay, Aragua, Venezuela
- Batted: Right Threw: Right

Teams
- As manager: Cervecería Caracas (1946–1952); Leones del Caracas (1956); Licoreros de Pampero (1959–1962); Tiburones de la Guaira (1962–1965); Tigres de Aragua (1965–1967)

Career highlights and awards
- AWS Most Valuable Player (1941); Four LVBP pennants (1947–1948; 1952; 1964)

Member of the Venezuelan

Baseball Hall of Fame
- Induction: 2003 (individual); 2006 (as part of 1941 AWS team); 2015 (as part of 1959 PanAm team)
Medals
Men's baseball
Representing Venezuela
Baseball World Cup
Gold medal – first place	1941 Havana	Team
Gold medal – first place	1944 Caracas	Team
Bronze medal – third place	1942 Havana	Team
Manager for Venezuela
Baseball World Cup
Gold medal – first place	1944 Caracas	Team
Gold medal – first place	1945 Caracas	Team
Silver medal – second place	1953 Caracas	Team
Pan American Games
Gold medal – first place	1959 Chicago	Team
Central American and Caribbean Games
Gold medal – first place	1954 Mexico City	Team

José Antonio Casanova (February 18, 1918 – July 8, 1999) was a Venezuelan baseball shortstop, manager, and executive. He batted and threw right handed.

Casanova is regarded as the most successful manager in Venezuelan baseball history. A five-time championship manager, he enjoyed a fruitful managing career in the Venezuelan Professional Baseball League (LVBP), winning four titles with the Cervecería Caracas / Leones del Caracas (1948, 1949, 1951) and Tiburones de la Guaira (1964). Overall, he posted a 436–402 record for a .520 winning percentage.

Casanova also played on and managed the Venezuela national baseball team. A member of the "Heroes del '41" team that won the 1941 Amateur World Series, he went on to lead the country to several international titles in a career that spanned more than three decades.

== Playing career ==
Born in Maracaibo, Zulia, Casanova started his professional career in unaffiliated Venezuelan first division league, playing for the Centauros, Vencedor, Cardenales and Cervecería clubs. Casanova debuted with Centauros, representing Maracaibo, in 1935 at the age of 17. Playing with the Venezuela club under manager Manuel Malpica, he won the first division championship 1941, along with fellow Zulianos Luis Romero Petit and Guillermo Vento. Casanova also played in an exhibition series against the touring Cuban Stars of Negro league baseball in February 1941.

Casanova played for the Venezuela national baseball team that captured the 1941 Amateur World Series championship in Havana. In the championship game against Cuba, he was part of the three run rally for Venezuela, hitting a ground ball that was mishandled to score Chucho Ramos. Casanova's throw to Dalmiro Finol at second base was the final out to secure the world title. He was awarded the honor of Most Valuable Player, becoming the first non-Cuban to win the award. Casanova posted a .429 batting average in the group stage of the tournament, (Note: Excluding the championship game against Cuba) with 12 hits in 28 at-bats over all eight of Venezuela's group stage games.

He returned to play with Venezuela at the 1942 Amateur World Series, though Venezuela's performance this year only managed a bronze. Casanova went 1-for-11 (.091) with three strikeouts. In the 1944 tournament, as player manager for the evetual champions, he went hitless in a single at-bat.

Casanova was part of the Cervecería Princesa club, based in Maiquetía, when it relocated to the capital and took the name Cervecería Caracas (the team that would become the present-day Leones del Caracas. He managed Cervecería to a title in 1943. In 1945, Casanova managed the Venezuelan All-Stars in the Serie Monumental, a series played against visiting Negro leaguers such as Jackie Robinson and Roy Campanella.

== Managerial career ==
As player-manager of Cervecería Caracas, Casanova was an inaugural manager of the Venezuelan Professional Baseball League (along with Daniel Canónico, Juan Antonio Yanes, and Manuel Capote) when it played its first professional season in 1946.

He guided the Venezuelan national team that clinched world championships in the Amateur World Series in 1944 and 1945, with both editions held in Caracas. At the 1953 Amateur World Series (also in Caracas), he led Venezuela to a second place finish behind Cuba; despite criticism, Casanova added a young Luis Aparicio to the team. Casanova managed Venezuela to another championship at the 1954 Central American and Caribbean Games in Mexico City. In 1959, he was selected as manager for the Venezuelan squad that competed at the 1959 Pan American Games held in Chicago; the team ultimately won the gold medal, marking Venezuela's only victory in the event to date.

Casanova continued managing in amateur baseball, steering Distrito Federal to an amateur championship in 1953. He also served as manager for the Venezuelan Military Academy team during 29 years.

In 1962, Casanova returned to professional baseball when he bought the franchise rights to the moribund Licoreros de Pampero of the LVBP, for the symbolic price of one bolívar. Though he considered reviving the Santa Marta club, he ultimately founded the Tiburones de La Guaira team. He was one of the team's first managers, leading the team to a championship in 1965 Casanova left after the championship season, after several disagreements with the executive board, and went on to manage the Tigres de Aragua.

== Legacy ==
In 2003, José Antonio Casanova was enshrined into the Venezuelan Baseball Hall of Fame and Museum as part of their first class. He was inducted as well in the Hall in 2006, when the entire 1941 AWS Champion Team was honored. Then, in 2015 he earned a third induction when the 1959 PanAm Games Champion Team was enshrined. A baseball park in Caracas, the Estadio José Antonio Casanova, is named after him.
