= Rogelio Martínez (baseball) =

Cuban baseball player (1918-2010)

- Pitcher
- Born: November 5, 1918; Cidra, Matanzas Province, Cuba
- Died: May 24, 2010 (aged 91); New London, Connecticut, U.S.
- Batted: Right Threw: Right

MLB debut
- July 13, 1950, for the Washington Senators

Last MLB appearance
- July 16, 1950, for the Washington Senators

MLB statistics
- Win–loss record: 0–1
- Strikeouts: 0
- Earned run average: 27.00
- Stats at Baseball Reference

Teams
- Washington Senators (1950)

Rogelio Martínez
Medal record

Representing Cuba

Men's baseball

Baseball World Cup
| Silver medal – second place | 1941 Havana | Team |
| Gold medal – first place | 1943 Havana | Team |
| Bronze medal – third place | 1944 Caracas | Team |

Rogelio Bautista Martínez Ulloa (November 5, 1918 – May 24, 2010) was a pitcher in Major League Baseball who played briefly for the Washington Senators during the 1950 season. Listed at 6 ft 0 in (1.83 m), 180 lb., Martínez batted and threw right-handed. He was born in Cidra, Matanzas Province, Cuba. Martínez was nicknamed Limonar, after the modest little town in his native Matanzas where he started to play baseball. In one major league season, Martínez posted a 0–1 record with a 27.00 ERA in two appearances, including one start, giving up four runs on four hits and two walks while striking out none in 1.1 innings of work.

Martínez died at the age of 91 after suffering an internal hemorrhage after a fall.

== See also ==
- 1950 Washington Senators season
- List of Major League Baseball players from Cuba
