= 1945 Amateur World Series =

Tournament details
- Country: Venezuela
- Venue: 1 (in 1 host city)
- Dates: October 27 – November 18
- Teams: 6
- Defending champions: Venezuela

Final positions
- Champions: Venezuela (3rd title)
- Runners-up: Colombia
- Third place: Panama
- Fourth place: Nicaragua

Tournament statistics
- Games played: 20

Awards
- MVP: (Venezuela) Héctor Benítez

The 1945 Amateur World Series was the eighth edition of the Amateur World Series (AWS), an international men's amateur baseball tournament. The tournament was sanctioned by the International Baseball Federation (which retroactively titled it the 1945 Baseball World Cup). The tournament took place, for the second time, in Venezuela, which had also hosted the previous (1944) tournament. It was contested by six national teams playing ten games each from October 27 through November 18 at the Estadio San Agustín in Caracas.

The tournament was won by hosts Venezuela, which finished undefeated with a perfect 10–0 record to earn its second consecutive gold medal and third overall. It would be the last major international sporting competition won by the country for 81 years, until Venezuela defeated the United States at the 2026 World Baseball Classic.

== Background ==
Cuba, Mexico, and the Dominican Republic boycotted this AWS in protest of the events of the previous edition, when controversy surrounded the tournament regarding umpiring decisions, which had led to forfeits of games and general ill-will. Puerto Rico also did not participate.

The tournament was held before a backdrop of political change both at home and abroad. On October 18, 1945, just nine days before the tournament's opening, Venezuelan military dictator Isaías Medina Angarita was deposed, to be replaced by the Accion Democratica government of Rómulo Betancourt. The recent end of World War II contributed to the absence of the United States, which had not participated in the series since 1942 (and would not do so again until 1969).

== Summary ==
With the absence of Cuba, Venezuela was the clear favorite in the tournament. Managed by José Antonio Casanova, most of its players had already competed in the Amateur World Series, and seven had won it twice previously (1941 and 1944). Debuting with the Venezuelan side was 19-year-old Alfonso "Chico" Carrasquel (who would ultimately be cut from the team due to disagreements with Casanova before the final game).

Colombia finished in second place with a 7–3 record and won silver for its first medal in series history, while Panama went 6–4 for a bronze medal. It was also the first medal for the Panamanians in the tournament.

Nicaragua, a former silver medalist both in 1939 and 1940, placed fourth at 5–5. The Costa Rica and El Salvador teams debuted in the Series and shared last place with a 1–9 mark.

Héctor Benítez of Venezuela earned Most Valuable Player honors after leading the hitter in batting average (.526), hits (20), RBI (16) and runs scored (16). Teammate Luis Zuloaga was the top pitcher with a 4–0 record, while setting a Series record with seven consecutive wins. Other statistical leaders for Venezuela were Ramón Fernández, with 21 hits, and Luis Romero Petit, who stole nine bases.

Another well observed performance came from Panamanian catcher León Kellman, who was the only player to hit two home runs in the Series. Previously, in 1941, Kellman was the only player to homer in the Series.

== Results ==
Pos	Team	Pld	W	L	RF	RA	RD	PCT	GB	VEN	COL	PAN	NIC	CRC	SLV	VEN	COL	PAN	NIC	CRC	SLV
1	Venezuela (H)	10	10	0	110	20	+90	1.000	—		3–0	8–4	3–0	11–1	10–1		12–0	4–3	13–9	15–1	31–1
2	Colombia	10	7	3	61	42	+19	.700	3	0–3		8–5	5–2	14–1	8–1	0–12		3–1	3–8	11–7	9–2
3	Panama	10	6	4	71	39	+32	.600	4	4–8	5–8		10–9	9–3	9–0	3–4	1–3		11–1	7–2	12–1
4	Nicaragua	10	5	5	63	48	+15	.500	5	0–3	2–5	9–10		6–0	8–0	9–13	8–3	1–11		9–3	11–0
5	Costa Rica	10	1	9	25	88	−63	.100	9	1–11	1–14	3–9	0–6		7–5	1–15	7–11	2–7	3–9		0–1
6	El Salvador	10	1	9	12	105	−93	.100	9	1–10	1–8	0–9	0–8	5–7		1–31	2–9	1–12	0–11	1–0	

Source: Núñez and Méndez, p. 331-36
(H) Hosts

== Honors and awards ==
=== Statistical leaders ===
Batting leaders
Statistic	Name	Total
Batting average	(Venezuela) Héctor Benítez	.526
Hits	(Venezuela) Ramón Fernández	21
Runs	(Venezuela) Héctor Benítez	16
Home runs	(Panama) León Kellman	2
Runs batted in	(Venezuela) Héctor Benítez	16
Stolen bases	(Venezuela) Luis Romero Petit	9

Pitching leaders
Statistic	Name	Total
Wins	(Venezuela) Luis Zuloaga	4

=== Awards ===
Award	Player	Ref.
Most Valuable Player	(Venezuela) Héctor Benítez	

== Bibliography ==
- Bjarkman, P. (2007). A History of Cuban Baseball, 1864–2006. McFarland & Company. ISBN 978-0-78-642829-8.
- José Antero Núñez; Alfredo Méndez (1991). Oro y Glorias del Beisbol Venezolano. Caracas: JAN Editor.
