= Manuel Malpica =

Venezuelan baseball player (1909–1970)

Manuel Antonio Malpica
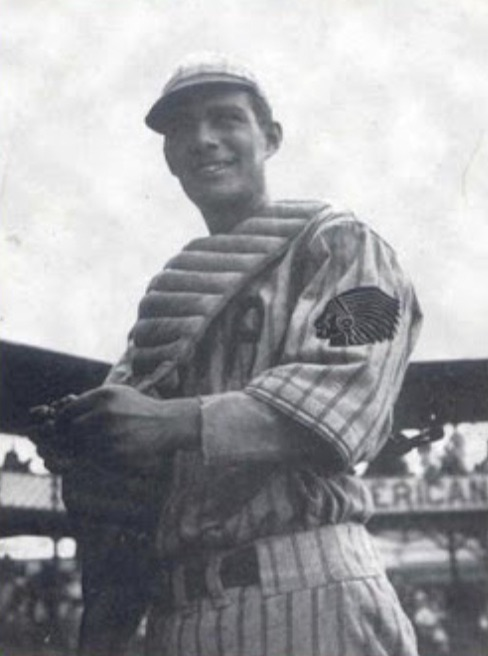
- Mapica in the 1930s
- Catcher / Manager
- Born: January 20, 1909; Valencia, Carabobo, Venezuela
- Died: June 6, 1970 (aged 61); Caracas, Venezuela

Member of the Venezuelan

Baseball Hall of Fame
- Induction: 2006 (as part of 1941 AWS team)
Medals
Manager for Venezuela
Men's baseball
Amateur World Series
Gold medal – first place	1941 Havana	Team
Bronze medal – third place	1942 Havana	Team

Manuel Antonio Malpica (January 20, 1909 — June 6, 1970), nicknamed "El Pollo" (lit. "The Chicken"), was a Venezuelan baseball player, manager, executive, and physician. He is best known for skippering the Venezuela national baseball team that won the 1941 Amateur World Series.

Malpica's playing career started in the Venezuelan amateur league, where he played with the "Latinos de Valencia" team in 1926, before moving to the Magallanes club in Caracas in 1929. With Magallanes, he played in the first games against the Royal Criollos club, a series would eventually evolve into the rivalry between Magallanes and Caracas. On the Concordia club in 1933, he played alongside Martín Dihigo, Alejandro "Patón" Carrasquel, and Luis Aparicio "El Grande". Malpica went on to manage the Venezuela club to a championship in the 1941 first division.

As manager of the Venezuelan team at the 1941 Amateur World Series, held in Havana, Malpica won the country's first major international title, defeating heavily-favored Cuba in the tie-breaking championship game. Upon returning to Venezuela, the team was hailed as national heroes. Malpica returned to manage Venezuela at the 1942 Amateur World Series, where the team finished in third place.

Malpica earned a medical degree from the Central University of Venezuela, practicing sports medicine with various professional and amateur baseball teams. He later became one of the first owners of the Tiburones de La Guaira baseball team in the Venezuelan Professional Baseball League, founded in 1962 by José Antonio Casanova, whom he had managed in 1941. Malpica assumed the role of team president in 1965, after Casanova left to manage the Tigres de Aragua.

Malpica, considered one of the first great Venezuelan catchers alongside Baudilio Díaz, Henry Blanco, and Salvador Pérez, is the namesake of the Manuel "Pollo" Malpica Award, which honors the best catcher in the Venezuelan winter league.
