= Tony Ordeñana =

Cuban baseball player (1918–1988)

- Shortstop
- Born: October 30, 1918; Guanabacoa, Cuba
- Died: September 29, 1988 (aged 69); Miami, Florida, US
- Batted: Right Threw: Right

MLB debut
- October 3, 1943, for the Pittsburgh Pirates

Last MLB appearance
- October 3, 1943, for the Pittsburgh Pirates

MLB statistics
- Batting average: .500
- Home runs: 0
- Runs batted in: 3
- Stats at Baseball Reference

Teams
- Pittsburgh Pirates (1943)

Antonio Ordeñana Rodríguez [Or-deh-nyahna] (October 30, 1918 – September 29, 1988), nicknamed "Mosquito", was a Major League Baseball shortstop who appeared in one game for the Pittsburgh Pirates in 1943. The 5'9", 158 lb. rookie was a native of Guanabacoa, Cuba. He was born on October 30, 1918, in Guanabacoa, Havana, Cuba.

Ordeñana is one of many ballplayers who only appeared in the major leagues during World War II. His major league debut was on October 3, 1943, and he was in the starting lineup at home against the Philadelphia Phillies for the last game of the season. The Pirates lost the game 11–3, but Ordeñana went 2-for-4 and drove in all three runs against starter and winner Roger McKee. Ordeñana truly was a "one-game wonder"...excellent in the field as well as with the bat. He recorded two putouts, five assists, no errors, and participated in one double play.

Ordeñana died at the age of 69 in Miami, Florida.
