= Guillermo Vento =

Venezuelan baseball player (1921–2006)

- Catcher / Outfielder / First baseman / Third baseman
- Born: July 5, 1921; Maracaibo, Zulia, Venezuela
- Batted: Right Threw: Right

debut
- 1946

Last appearance
- 1967

Teams
- Venezuelan League: Cervecería Caracas (1946–1952); Leones del Caracas (1952–1955; 1958–1962; 1967); Licoreros de Pampero (1955–1958); Tiburones de La Guaira (1962–1963); Dominican Republic League: Águilas Cibaeñas (1952); Mexican League: Sultanes de Monterrey (1954–1958)

Career highlights and awards
- Two-time BWC champion team (1941; 1943); Three-time VPBL champion team (1949; 1952–1953); DSL champion team (1952); Three Caribbean Series appearances (1949; 1952–1953); Set VPBL season record with six hits in a single game (1947)

Member of the Venezuelan

Baseball Hall of Fame
- Induction: 2006 (as part of 1941 AWS team)
Medals
Representing Venezuela
Men's baseball
Baseball World Cup
Gold medal – first place	1941 Havana	Team
Gold medal – first place	1944 Caracas	Team
Gold medal – first place	1945 Caracas	Team
Bronze medal – third place	1942 Havana	Team

Guillermo Aquilino Vento (July 5, 1921 – August 8, 2006) was a Venezuelan former professional baseball player. Listed at 5 ft 8 in (1.73 m), 165 lb (75 kg), Vento batted and threw right handed. He was born in Maracaibo, Zulia.

Primarily a line-drive hitter and defensive catcher, Vento also displayed versatility as a third baseman, corner outfielder and first sacker, as well as a base runner. He was a member of the Venezuela national team that won gold medals in the 1941 and 1944 Baseball World Cup tournaments, helping his team to an upset victory over Cuba in 1941, while leading the 1944 edition with 14 runs scored.

In 1946, Vento entered the Venezuelan Professional Baseball League with the Cervecería Caracas club, playing for the franchise through the 1954–1955 season, after it was named the Leones del Caracas. During this span, he won three pennant titles with Caracas and played in three Caribbean Series. As a 25-year rookie, Vento hit a .286 batting average with five home runs and 21 RBI in 33 games, including a .476 slugging percentage, while improving to a .303 average in the 1946–1947 season.

On November 30, 1947, Vento became the first LVBP Venezuelan Professional Baseball League player to connect six hits in a single game. This record would eventually be matched by Pete Koegel (1974), Steve Carter (1991) and Ramón Flores (2014).

Vento was instrumental in the Cervecería championship during the 1948–1949 season, going 31-for-118 for a .269 average, including a 22-game hitting streak, while catching in 30 of the 31 games of his team. He then hit .375 for Cervecería in the 1949 Caribbean Series, good for third in the batting race behind Al Gionfriddo (.533) and Chuck Connors (.409).

His most productive season came in 1950–1951, when he batted .309 in 53 games, slugged .409, and posted career-numbers in hits (69) doubles (14), RBI (34), runs (42) and total bases (96).

In between, Vento joined the Águilas Cibaeñas club of the now extinct Dominican Summer League in the 1952 season. He batted .327 and slugged .470 in 43 games to help his team win the pennant. Vento usually served as a battery mate for fellow country man Emilio Cueche in many games, including the 4–1 victory over the Tigres del Licey in the decisive seventh game of the final series, to give the Aguilas its first championship title in the long storied history of the franchise.

He later played from 1954 through 1958 for the Sultanes de Monterrey of the Mexican Summer League, where he posted a .271 average with 40 homers and 204 RBI in 410 games.

Vento collected .300 or more in four of his 19 seasons in the Venezuela winter league, with a career high .346 in 1958–1959, which was the fifth-best of the season, being surpassed only by Rudy Regalado (.366), Joe Collins (.360), Rod Graber (.350) and Bill Taylor. That season, Vento collected 50 total bases for a .481 slugging, also a personal mark for the 37-year-old veteran.

Besides, Vento played three seasons with the Licoreros de Pampero, returned to Caracas for the second time, and played his last season with the Tiburones de La Guaira in 1962–1963. He later coached and served as an instructor during the next four seasons.

At age 45, Vento made a special appearance for the Leones club in the 1966–1967 tournament, going 1-for-5, strictly in pinch-hitting duties.

In 2006, he received the honor of induction into the Venezuelan Baseball Hall of Fame and Museum as a member of the 1941 WBC Champion Team.

== Batting statistics ==
=== Regular season ===
Years	League	GP	AB	R	H	2B	3B	HR	RBI	SB	TB	BA	SLG
1946–1967	VPBL	678	2450	341	691	108	12	15	117	52	868	.282	.354
1952	DSL	43	202	31	66	13	2	4	33	8	95	.327	.470
1954–1958	MEX	410	1475	202	399	59	5	40	204	31	588	.271	.399

=== Postseason ===
Years	League	GP	AB	R	H	2B	3B	HR	RBI	SB	TB	BA	SLG
1947; 1962	VPBL	5	18	3	5	0	1	0	2	0	7	.267	.389
1949; 1952–1953	Caribbean Series	9	33	3	8	1	0	0	3	2	9	.242	.273
