= Estadio San Agustín =

Stadium in Caracas, Venezuela

- Former names: Estadio Cerveza Caracas (1941–60)
- Location: Caracas, Venezuela
- Capacity: 15,000 (1944)

Construction
- Opened: 1928; 98 years ago
- Closed: 1952; 74 years ago
- Demolished: 1960; 66 years ago
- Cost: 250,000 bolivars

Tenant
- Venezuelan Professional Baseball League (1946–1952)

The Estadio San Agustín was a baseball stadium in Caracas, Venezuela. Built in 1928 and demolished in 1960, it was the original home of the Venezuelan Professional Baseball League (LVBP), which played at the stadium from its establishment in 1946 to the 1951–52 season, after which the league moved to the newly built Estadio Universitario de Caracas.

== History ==
The stadium was located in the San Agustín Parish of Caracas, on a grassy plot of land nicknamed "La Yerbera" (lit. "The Herb Garden") that gave it the nickname Estadio la Yerbera. It was built by Alfonzo Rivas, the owner of the Maizina cornstarch company. The first game at the stadium was held on January 29, 1928, between the Santa Marta club and the visiting Crisfield Crabbers of the American Eastern Shore League. The construction cost 250,000 bolivars, and its initial capacity was 5,000 fans. On the Crabbers was former major leaguer George Edmondson and future major leaguer Paul Richards; Santa Marta included Dominican import and Negro leaguer Tetelo Vargas; Santa Marta won the game 3–1.

The stadium underwent several renovations. The infield was bare until 1942, which became the source of some controversy, as Abelardo Raidi blamed the Venezuelan national team's poor performance at the 1940 Amateur World Series on the grass infield at the Estadio La Tropical in Havana, a playing surface they were unfamiliar with at San Agustín. Raidi chose to prepare for the 1941 tournament (which Venezuela won) not at San Agustín, but on the grass pitch at the nearby Estadio Olímpico El Paraíso. San Agustín eventually expanded its capacity to 15,000 spectators in 1944 in preparation for the 1944 Amateur World Series, the first major international sporting event held in Venezuela. It was the first stadium in Venezuela to have artificial lighting, installed in 1946. It also hosted the Serie Monumental, an exhibition series between two all-star teams from Venezuela and the American Negro leagues.

In addition to baseball, it hosted association football, volleyball, and basketball games, as well as track and field events, boxing matches, equestrian events, and auto races. The Venezuelan Primera División played here often in the 1920s, and the stadium hosted domestic clubs like Unión S.C., Centro Atlético, Dos Caminos, Loyola S.C., Litoral, Deportivo Venezuela, and Deportivo Vasco, as well as foreign sides such as Atlético Corrales.

In 1941, the Estadio San Agustín was acquired by the Cerveceria Caracas for an amount of 450 thousand bolivars. From that point on, it would be officially known as the Estadio Cerveza Caracas.

On January 12, 1946, the Estadio Cerveza Caracas became home to the first professional baseball game in Venezuela, between Magallanes and Venezuela; Alejandro Carrasquel was the winning pitcher for Magallanes, and Luis Aparicio Ortega (also of Magallanes) registered both the first hit of the professional league and the first run.

The last professional game at the stadium was held between Leones del Caracas and Navegantes del Magallanes on February 14, 1952. The game, a pitcher's duel between José "Carrao" Bracho (Caracas) and Johnny Hetki (Magallanes), stretched into extra innnings and was ultimately stopped in the eighteenth inning with the score tied at 3-3. Immediately afterwards, the league announced it would move to the new Estadio Universitario de Caracas for the following season.

Eight years later, the stadium site was expropriated and demolished the Stadium to build the La Yerbera residential complex.
