= Licoreros de Pampero =

The Licoreros de Pampero was a baseball club who played from 1955 through 1962 in the Venezuelan Professional Baseball League. The team joined the league as a replacement for the Patriotas de Venezuela and played its home games at the Estadio Universitario in Caracas.

== History ==
The Pampero team was sponsored by the rum company of that name, and was managed by former Washington Senators catcher Fermin Guerra in its inaugural season. The team finished second behind the champions Industriales de Valencia, relegating the strong Leones del Caracas and Navegantes del Magallanes to the following places in the four-team league. The pitching staff was headed by Clarence Churn, who posted a 10–4 record and a 3.04 earned run average, while tying for the most wins with Magallanes' Ramón Monzant and Caracas' Cal McLish. Besides Churn, Roger Bowman went 9–6 with a 3.55 ERA and 70 strikeouts. Meanwhile, the offense was clearly led by Pedro Formental (.368, six home runs, 32 runs batted in), Mike Goliat (.287, four HR, 34 RBI) and Loren Babe (.293, 43 runs scored, 25 RBI).

But the team suffered three losing campaigns in a row, before rebounding somewhat in 1959–60 with a 15–13 record in a season shortened by a players' strike. Their most productive season came in 1960–61, when they finished 28–24 for a 3rd place, but did not qualify for the playoffs.

The Licoreros finished last in 1961–62 and ceased operations at the end of the season. After that, Pampero was sold for the symbolic price of one Venezuelan bolívar by its major shareholder Alejandro Hernández to José Antonio Casanova, by this time the team's skipper. Casanova, who did not have enough financial resources to go through an entire season, made an alliance with a significant group of personalities and traders to acquire the franchise. Then it was renamed the Tiburones de La Guaira and debuted in the 1962–63 season.

== Yearly team records ==
Season	Record	Finish	Manager
1955–56	27–26	2nd	Fermín Guerra
1956–57	13–14 (1st half); 13–14 (2nd half)	3rd 2nd	Benito Torrens
1957–58	17–23	4th	Clay Bryant
1958–59	17–28	4th	Alejandro Carrasquel
1959–60	15–13	–	Alejandro Carrasquel; José Antonio Casanova
1960–61	28–24	3rd	José Antonio Casanova
1961–62	21–30	4th	José Antonio Casanova

== Notable players ==
- Teolindo Acosta
- Bob Alexander
- Matty Alou
- Ken Aspromonte
- John André
- Loren Babe
- Frank Barnes
- Bo Belinsky
- Babe Birrer
- Charlie Bishop
- Dámaso Blanco
- Gary Blaylock
- Bob Bowman
- Roger Bowman
- Joe Caffie
- Chico Carrasquel
- Elio Chacón
- Neil Chrisley
- Clarence Churn
- Gene Collins
- Clay Dalrymple
- Joe Durham
- Pedro Formental
- Mike Goliat
- Ross Grimsley
- Eli Grba
- Hal Griggs
- Connie Grob
- Fermin Guerra
- Bob Hale
- Buddy Hicks
- Dave Hoskins
- Don Johnson
- Gordon Jones
- Lou Limmer
- Don Lock
- Joe Lonnett
- Jim Marshall
- Dolan Nichols
- Buddy Peterson
- Leo Posada
- Rudy Regalado
- Luis Romero Petit
- Luis Salazar
- Jack Spring
- Joe Stanka
- Lee Thomas
- Fred Valentine

== Team highlights ==
- 1955–56: Clarence Churn, tied for the most victories among pitchers with 10.
- 1956–57: Lou Limmer, led the league with 41 RBIs.
- 1957–58:
  - Teolindo Acosta, won the batting title with a .385 average.
  - Mike Goliat, led the league with 28 RBIs.
- 1958–59: Rudy Regalado, won the batting title with a .366 average.
- 1959–60:
  - Gene Collins, led the league with a .356 batting average and 17 RBIs.
  - Babe Birrer, posted the best ERA among pitchers with a 1.89 mark.
- 1960–61:
  - Don Lock, led the league with 10 home runs
  - Babe Birrer, posted the best ERA among pitchers with a 1.64 mark.
- 1961–62: Bo Belinsky, led all pitchers with a 2.13 ERA and set an all-time record with 156 strikeouts.

== Sources ==
- Gutiérrez, Daniel; Alvarez, Efraim; Gutiérrez (h), Daniel (2006). La Enciclopedia del Béisbol en Venezuela. LVBP, Caracas. ISBN 980-6996-02-X
- Gutiérrez, Daniel; González, Javier (1992). Numeritos del béisbol profesional venezolano (1946–1992). LVBP, Caracas. ISBN 980-0712-47-X
