= Bill Taylor (baseball) =

American baseball player (1929–2011)

- Outfielder
- Born: December 30, 1929; Alhambra, California, U.S.
- Died: September 15, 2011 (aged 81); Antelope Valley, California, U.S.
- Batted: Left Threw: Left

MLB debut
- April 14, 1954, for the New York Giants

Last MLB appearance
- May 8, 1958, for the Detroit Tigers

MLB statistics
- Batting average: .237
- Home runs: 7
- Runs batted in: 26
- Stats at Baseball Reference

Teams
- New York Giants (1954–1957); Detroit Tigers (1957–1958)

Career highlights and awards
- World Series champion (1954)

William Michael Taylor (December 30, 1929 – September 15, 2011) was an American professional baseball player who appeared in Major League Baseball as an outfielder for the New York Giants and Detroit Tigers for all or parts of five seasons (1954–1958).

== Baseball career ==
=== Minor leagues ===
Taylor was born in Alhambra, California. He threw and batted left-handed and was listed as 6 feet 3 inches (1.91 m) tall and 212 pounds (96 kg). He signed with the Pacific Coast League's Oakland Oaks in 1947 and was acquired by the Giants during the 1950 minor league baseball season. He spent most of 1953 with the Giants' Double-A minor league affiliate, the Nashville Volunteers. After posting a .350 batting average with 22 home runs in 107 games for Nashville, he was promoted to the Giants' Triple-A farm club, the Minneapolis Millers. He played 47 games for the Millers, batting .223 with seven home runs.

=== In Major League Baseball ===
Taylor made his Major League debut for the Giants on April 14, 1954, pinch hitting for Mario Picone and striking out against Brooklyn Dodgers' pitcher Don Newcombe. He spent the entire 1954 season with the National League champion Giants, appearing in 55 games and getting 12 hits in 65 at bats for a .185 batting average. He also hit two home runs, had ten runs batted in and scored four runs. He played nine games in the field without an error, seven in left field as Hall of Famer Monte Irvin's backup, and two in right field backing up Don Mueller. Although the Giants won the 1954 World Series in four games that season, Taylor did not see any playing time in the Fall Classic.

Taylor again spent the entire season with the Giants in 1955. He played in 65 games and had 17 hits in 64 at-bats for a .266 batting average, while hitting four home runs and a .516 slugging percentage. He played just two games in the field, both in right field. In 1956, he played most of the season back in the minors with the Millers, but did appear in one game for the Giants, getting a double in four at-bats. In 1957, he again played most of the season with the Millers, and went hitless in 11 games and nine at bats for the Giants.

On September 14, he was sold to the Detroit Tigers, and played in nine games for the Tigers. The 1958 campaign was Taylor's final season in the Major Leagues. He played in eight early-season games, all but one as a pinch hitter, and getting three hits in 8 at bats for a .375 batting average. After rosters were cut from 28 to 25 men in May, he spent most of 1958 with the Tigers' top affiliate, the Charleston Senators. He started 1959 with Charleston, but moved to the Buffalo Bisons in the Philadelphia Phillies' organization in midseason. He also played for the Bisons in 1960 and 1961.

In his Major League career, Taylor played 149 games over five seasons and had 41 hits in 173 at-bats for a .237 batting average. He hit 7 home runs, and 26 runs batted in and 17 runs scored, a .264 on-base percentage and a .405 slugging percentage. Of his 149 Major League games, he only played in the field in 18, all in the outfield. As a fielder, he made 13 putouts with no assists and no errors, for a career fielding percentage of 1.000. He also played in 1261 minor league games between 1947 and 1961, with a .311 batting average and 186 home runs.

=== Winter leagues ===
Taylor also played for the Navegantes del Magallanes and Leones del Caracas of the Venezuelan Winter League. He set two records while playing with Magallanes in the 1953–1954 season, when he became the first player in the league's history to hit three home runs in a single game, and for setting a new season mark with 16 home runs.

Taylor died on September 15, 2011, in Antelope Valley, California.
