= Dalmiro Finol =

Venezuelan baseball player

- Right fielder / First baseman
- Born: August 21, 1919; Barrancas, Zulia, Venezuela
- Died: May 16, 1994 (aged 74); Maracaibo, Zulia, Venezuela
- Batted: Right Threw: Right

LVBP statistics
- Batting average: .278
- Home runs: 48
- Runs batted in: 296
- Total bases: 695
- Slugging percentage: .407
- Games played: 471
- Stats at Baseball Reference

Teams
- Cervecería Caracas (1946–1952); Leones del Caracas (1952-1955); Gavilanes de Maracaibo (1953-1954); Navegantes del Magallanes (1954–1956)

Career highlights and awards
- Baseball World Cup Gold Medal (1941); Hit the first home run in Venezuelan League history (1946); Hit the first grand slam in Venezuelan League history (1946); Hit the first home run in Caribbean Series history (1949)

Member of the Venezuelan

Baseball Hall of Fame
- Induction: 2006 (as part of 1941 AWS team); 2012 (individual)
Medals
Representing Venezuela
Men's baseball
Baseball World Cup
Gold medal – first place	1941 Havana	Team
Bronze medal – third place	1942 Havana	Team
Gold medal – first place	1944 Caracas	Team
Gold medal – first place	1945 Caracas	Team
Latin American Series
Silver medal – second place	1952 Caracas	Team

Dalmiro Finol [dahl-mee'-roh / fe-nohl'] (August 21, 1919 – May 16, 1994) was a Venezuelan professional baseball player. Finol batted and threw right-handed. He was born in Barrancas, Zulia State.

A versatile utility man, Finol was able to play all positions except pitcher and catcher, playing mainly at right field and first base. Basically a line-drive hitter and a fine defensive player, he started his career in the Venezuelan League in 1946 with the Cervecería Caracas club, playing for the franchise in nine of his 11 professional seasons, often as its fourth batter. He also spent part of two seasons with the Gavilanes (1953–1954) and Magallanes (1955–1956) teams.

Although he never played in American baseball, Finol teamed with major league figures as Willard Brown, Alex Carrasquel, Chico Carrasquel, Wilmer Fields, Jim Pendleton and Len Yochim, among others.

As a rookie, he led the circuit with seven home runs, becoming the first player to win the league's home run title. In the midseason, he also became the first player to hit a grand slam in the league's history.

Finol later led the league with 35 RBI in the 1947–1948 season. His most productive effort came in the 1953–1954 tournament, when he posted career-highs in home runs (10), RBI (47) and games played (70). He also had two good seasons, hitting .320 in 1948–1949 and .365 in 1951–1952.

In an 11-season career, Finol batted a .278 average (475-for-1706) with 48 home runs and 296 RBI in 471 games, including 241 runs, 73 doubles, three triples, and 35 stolen bases.

Finol died in 1994 in Maracaibo, Zulia, at the age of 74.

== Milestones ==
- During the 1949 Caribbean Series Finol hit a home run off Cuban team pitcher Conrado Marrero, to become the first player ever to homer in the Series.
- Was a member of the Venezuelan team who won the 1941 Baseball World Cup tournament.
- In 2012 received the honor of induction into the Venezuelan Baseball Hall of Fame and Museum as part of their ninth class.
