= Luis Romero Petit =

Venezuelan baseball player (1917-2017)

- Third baseman
- Born: April 11, 1917; Maracaibo, Zulia, Venezuela
- Died: June 29, 2017 (aged 100); Caracas, Venezuela
- Batted: Right Threw: Right

Career highlights and awards
- 3× Baseball World Cup championship (1941; 1944–1945); 1941 Amateur World Series champion team Permanent Display at Venezuelan Baseball Hall of Fame and Museum (2006)

Luis Romero Petit (April 11, 1917 – June 29, 2017) was a Venezuelan professional baseball player. He batted and threw right handed.

== Career ==
A third baseman and leadoff hitter, Romero was a part of the Venezuela national baseball team which captured the Baseball World Cup Tournament in 1941.

Born in Maracaibo, Zulia, Romero grew up playing baseball in his hometown before moving to Caracas in 1939, where he played for four clubs in seven National Series tournaments spanning 1939–1945.

During the 1941 season, Petit was scouted and selected for the Venezuelan team that eventually won the Baseball World Cup held in Havana, Cuba, by defeating the highly favored Cuban squad in a tie-breaker game while placing Venezuela for the very first time among the world baseball elite.

Romero returned to BWC competition as a member of the Venezuelan team for the next four years, helping the team win two consecutive titles in 1944 and 1945, while leading the 1945 Tournament with nine stolen bases.

Afterwards, Romero became one of the 77 original founding players of the Venezuelan Professional Baseball League in 1946. At this time Romero anchored third base for the Cervecería Caracas club during seven seasons, then joined the Lácteos de Pastora, Patriotas de Venezuela and Licoreros de Pampero for the next five seasons, working as a part-time infielder and outfielder before retiring in 1957. His most productive season came in 1947, when he hit a career-high .317 and topped the league with 12 stolen bases.

Overall, Romero posted a career batting average of .234 in 366 games, scoring 181 runs and driving in 72 more while stealing 39 bases. In between, he made three appearances in the Caribbean Series (1949; 1953–1954).

Romero, along with his former teammates of the 1941 Baseball World Champion team, received recognition when the Venezuelan Baseball Hall of Fame and Museum enshrined the entire team in its 2006 class.

Romero died in Caracas in 2017, just two and a half months after his 100th birthday. As the time of his death, he was recognized as the oldest living former player of the legendary 1941 team.
