= Maracaibo =

- Municipality
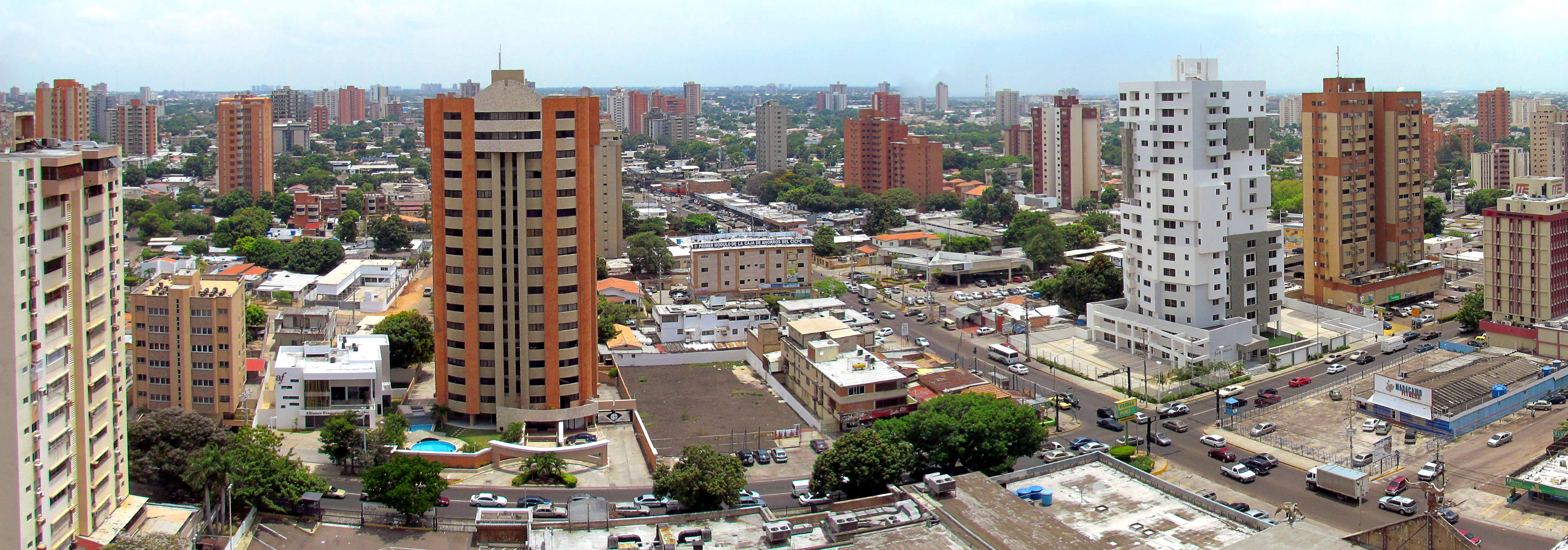
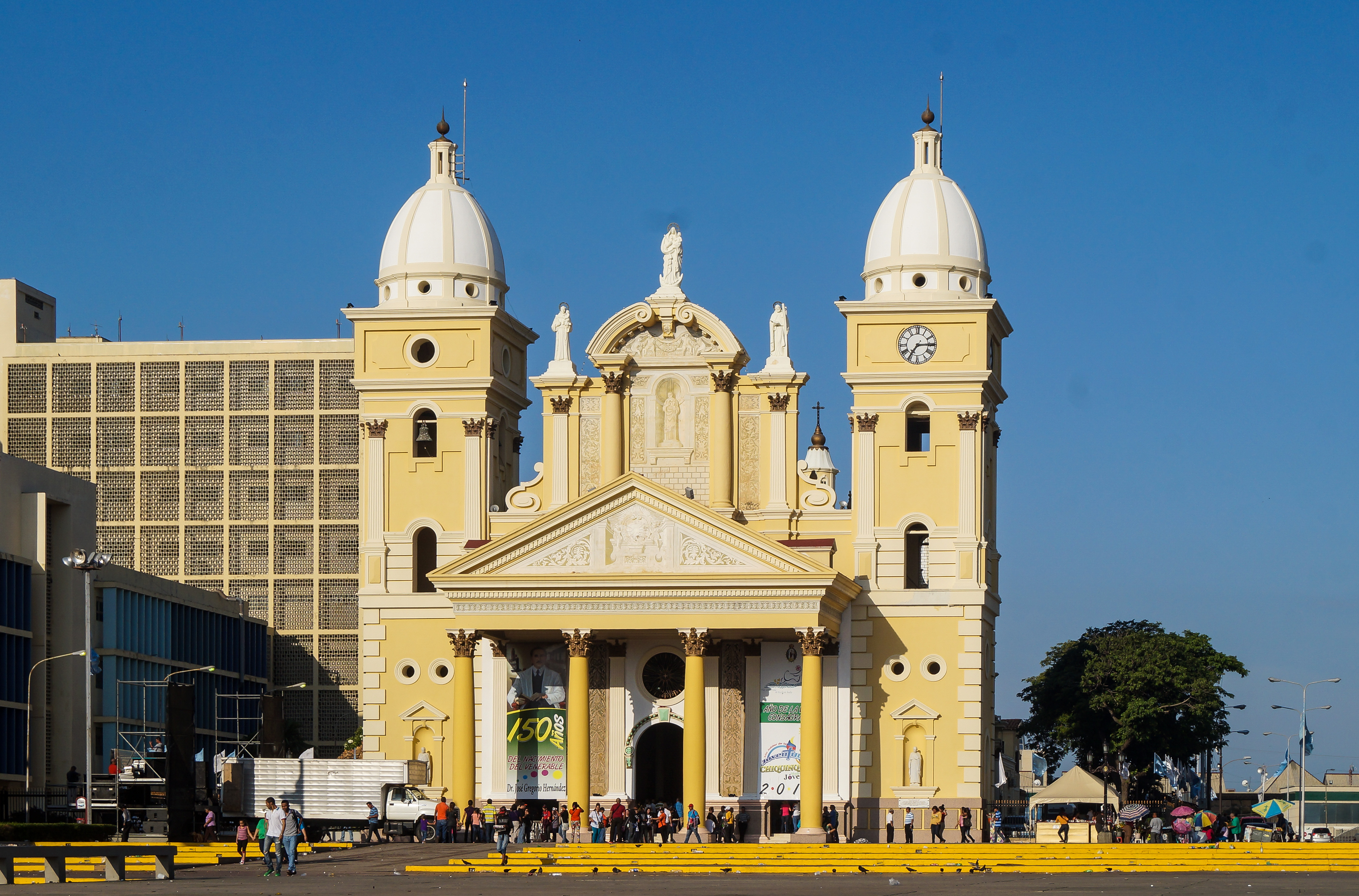
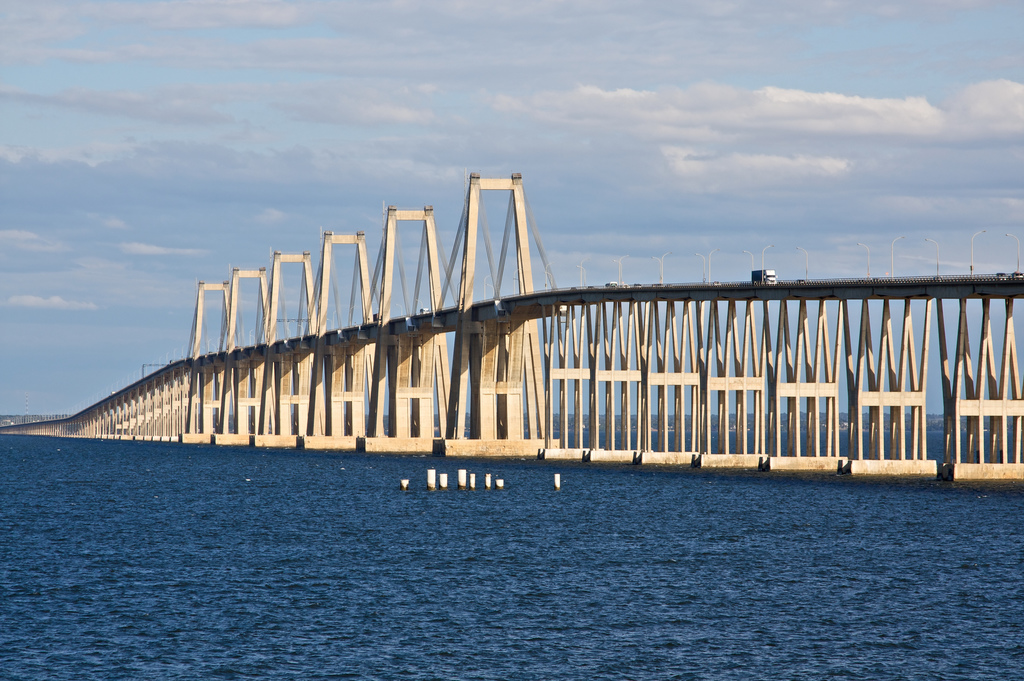
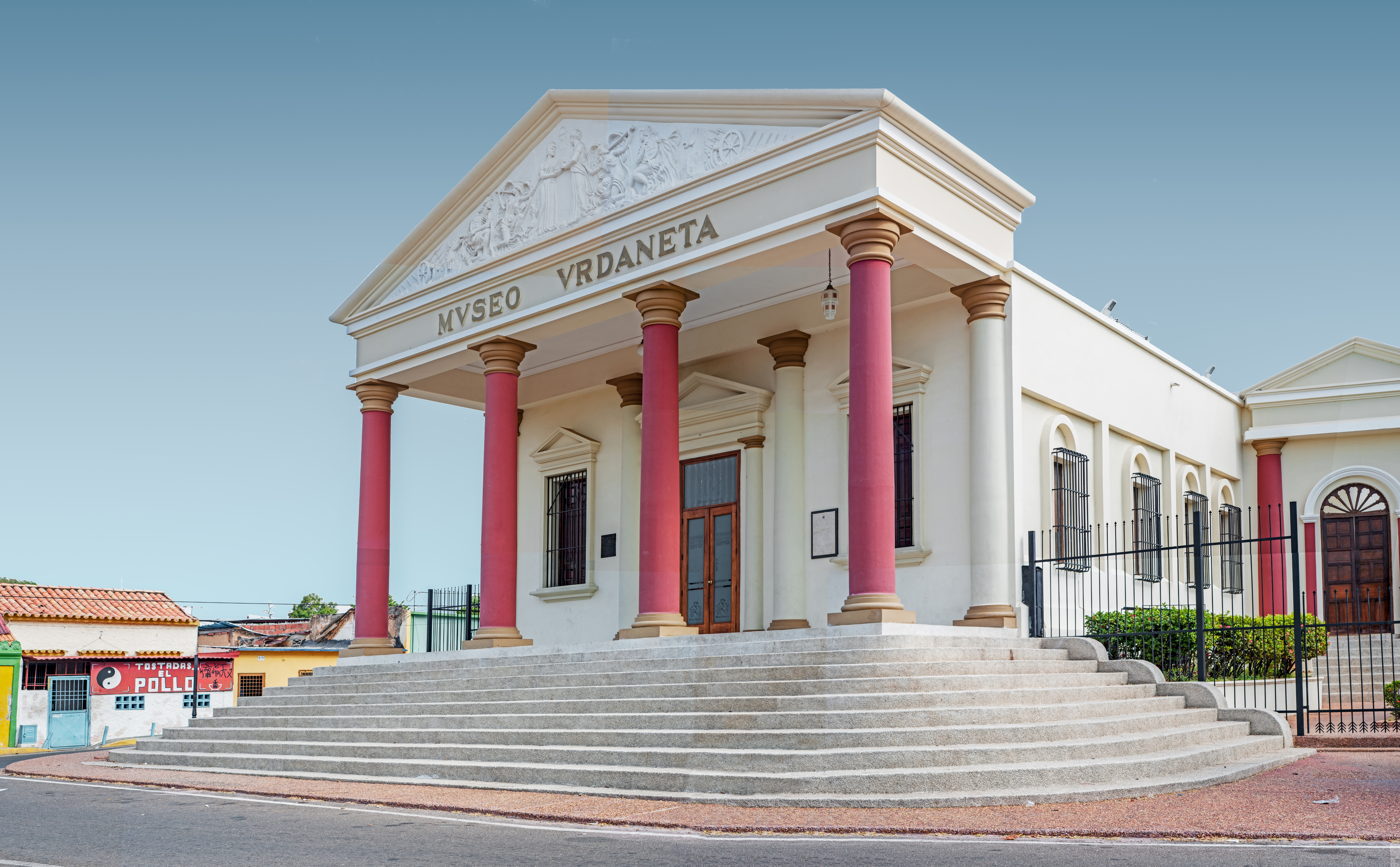
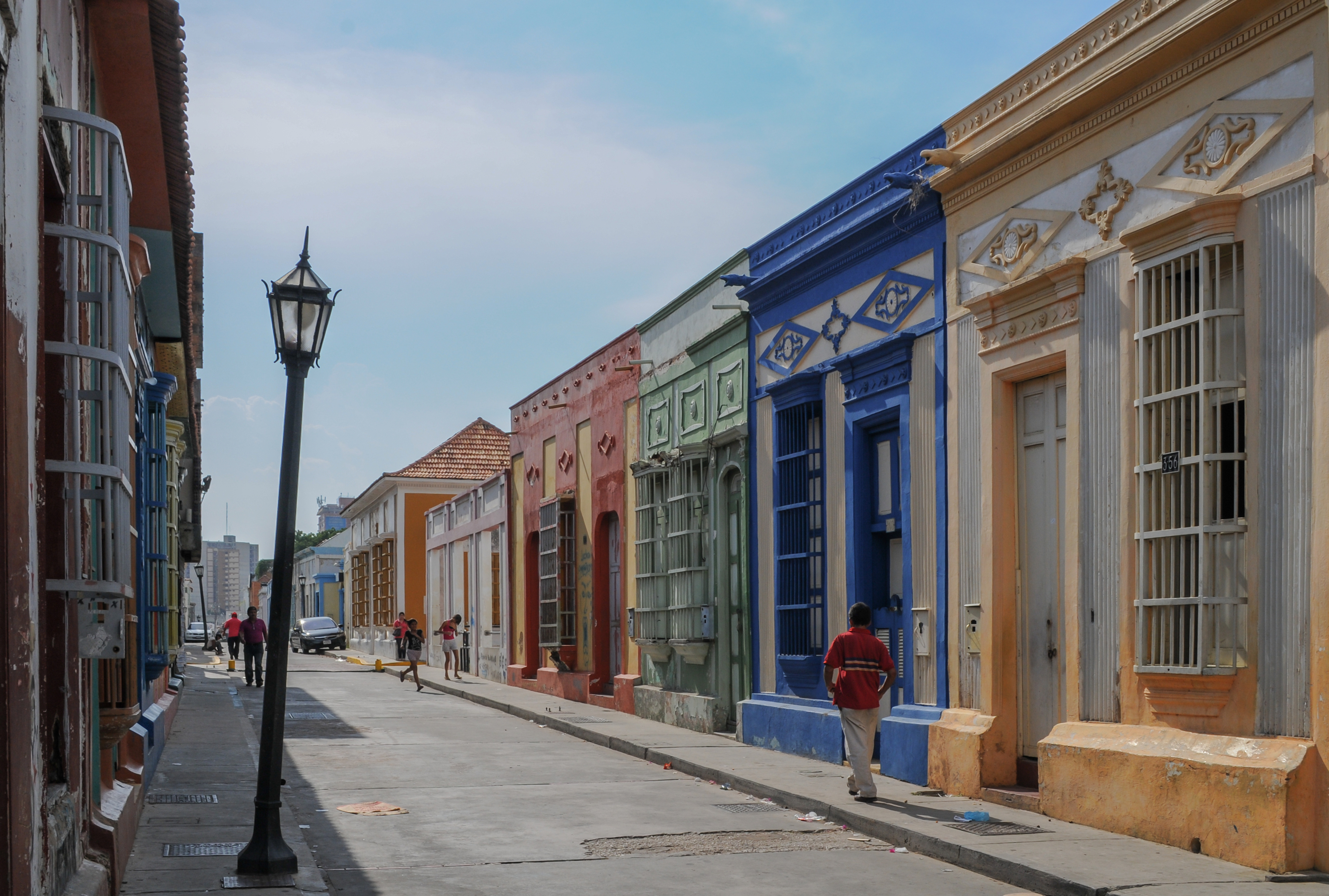
- Downtown Maracaibo Basilica of Our Lady of Chiquinquirá General Rafael Urdaneta Bridge and Lake Maracaibo Urdaneta Museum Carabobo Street

- Flag Coat of arms
- Nickname: "La Tierra del Sol Amada" (English: "The Beloved Land of the Sun")
- Motto: "Muy noble y leal" (English: "Very noble and loyal")
- Interactive map of Maracaibo
- Location within Venezuela Location within the Caribbean Location within South America
- Coordinates: 10°38′N 71°38′W
- Country: Venezuela
- State: Zulia
- First settled: 8 September 1529
- Founded: 1574
- Founder: Ambrosio Alfínger (1529); Alonso Pacheco (1569); Pedro Maldonado (1574)

Government
  - Type: Mayor–council
  - Body: Alcaldía de Maracaibo
  - Mayor: Gian Carlo Di Martino

Area
  - Metro: 1,393 km^{2} (538 sq mi)
- Elevation: 6 m (20 ft)

Population (2019 est.)
  - Municipality: 1,752,602
  - Rank: 2nd
  - Density: 1,600/km^{2} (4,200/sq mi)
  - Metro: 2,727,957
- Demonym(s): Marabino(a), Maracaibero(a), Maracucho(a)
- Time zone: UTC−4 (VET)
- Postal coded: 4001, 4002, 4003, 4004, 4005
- Area code: 261
- ISO 3166 code: VE-V
- Climate: BSh
- Website: comunas.gob.ve?s=Maracaibo
- The area and population figures refer to the municipality of Maracaibo. The metropolitan area of Maracaibo comprises the municipalities of Jesús Enrique Lossada, La Cañada de Urdaneta, Mara, Maracaibo and San Francisco.

Maracaibo (/ˌmærəˈkaɪboʊ/ MARR-ə-KY-boh, Spanish: [maɾaˈkajβo]; Wayuu: Marakaaya) is a city and municipality in northwestern Venezuela, located on the western shore of the strait that connects Lake Maracaibo to the Gulf of Venezuela. It is the capital of Zulia and is the second-largest city proper in Venezuela, after the national capital, Caracas. The city has an estimated population of 1,752,602, with the metropolitan area estimated at 2,727,957 as of 2019. Maracaibo is commonly nicknamed "Spanish: La Tierra del Sol Amada" (The Beloved Land of the Sun).

Maracaibo is considered the economic center of western Venezuela due to the petroleum industry that developed along the shores of Lake Maracaibo. It is sometimes referred to as the "First City of Venezuela" for being the first city in Venezuela to adopt various public services, including electricity. The city is also linked to the origin of the country's name, as it is located near the lake from which the name "Venezuela" allegedly derives.

Early settlements in the region were inhabited by Arawakan-speaking and Kalina peoples. The founding of Maracaibo is disputed, with unsuccessful attempts made in 1529 by Captain Ambrosio Ehinger and in 1569 by Captain Alonso Pacheco. The city was eventually founded in 1574 as "Nueva Zamora de la Laguna de Maracaibo" by Captain Pedro Maldonado. It became a key transshipment point for inland settlements after Gibraltar, located at the head of the lake, was destroyed by pirates in 1669. Permanent settlement did not occur until the early 17th century. The discovery of petroleum in 1917 led to rapid population growth due to migration.

Maracaibo is served by La Chinita International Airport, and is connected to the rest of the country by the General Rafael Urdaneta Bridge.

== Etymology ==
The origin of the name "Maracaibo" is uncertain. One popular legend attributes it to a young indigenous cacique named Mara, who is said to have resisted the Spanish conquistadors and died in battle. According to the story, upon his death, members of the Coquivacoa people shouted "¡Mara cayó!" ("Mara fell!"), which allegedly evolved into the name Maracaibo. However, this explanation is considered unlikely, as it assumes the use of Spanish by indigenous peoples at the time.

An alternative theory suggests that the name derives from the indigenous term "Maara-iwo," meaning "place where serpents abound."

== History ==
First version of coat of arms with royal elements, according to Discrezión de la laguna de la ciudad de Maracaibo in General Archive of the Indies.

=== Foundation ===
The first indigenous settlements in the region were established by Arawak and Carib peoples. Among them, the Añu tribe built rows of stilt houses along the northern shore of Lake Maracaibo. The first Europeans arrived in 1499.

The city of Maracaibo was founded three times. The first attempt occurred during the Klein-Venedig period (1528–1546), when the Welser banking family of Augsburg was granted control over Venezuela Province by Emperor Charles I of Spain. In August 1529, the German explorer Ambrosius Ehinger led an expedition to Lake Maracaibo, encountering strong resistance from the indigenous Coquivacoa. After a series of battles, he established a settlement on 8 September 1529, naming it German: Neu-Nürnberg ("New Nuremberg") and naming the lake after the chieftain Mara, who had died in combat. The Spanish later renamed the settlement Maracaibo.

Due to a lack of activity in the area, Nikolaus Federmann relocated the population in 1535 to Santa Marta, near the then-capital Santa Ana de Coro. A second attempt to settle Maracaibo was made by Captain Alonso Pacheco in 1569, but it was abandoned in 1573 due to persistent attacks by local indigenous groups.

In 1574, the city was permanently re-founded by Captain Pedro Maldonado under orders from Governor Diego de Mazariegos. It was named Nueva Zamora de la Laguna de Maracaibo, in honor of Mazariegos's hometown of Zamora. The settlement began to grow, benefiting from favorable winds and a protected harbor on the western shore of Lake Maracaibo, near the narrows that connect the lake to the Gulf of Venezuela.

=== Pirate attacks ===
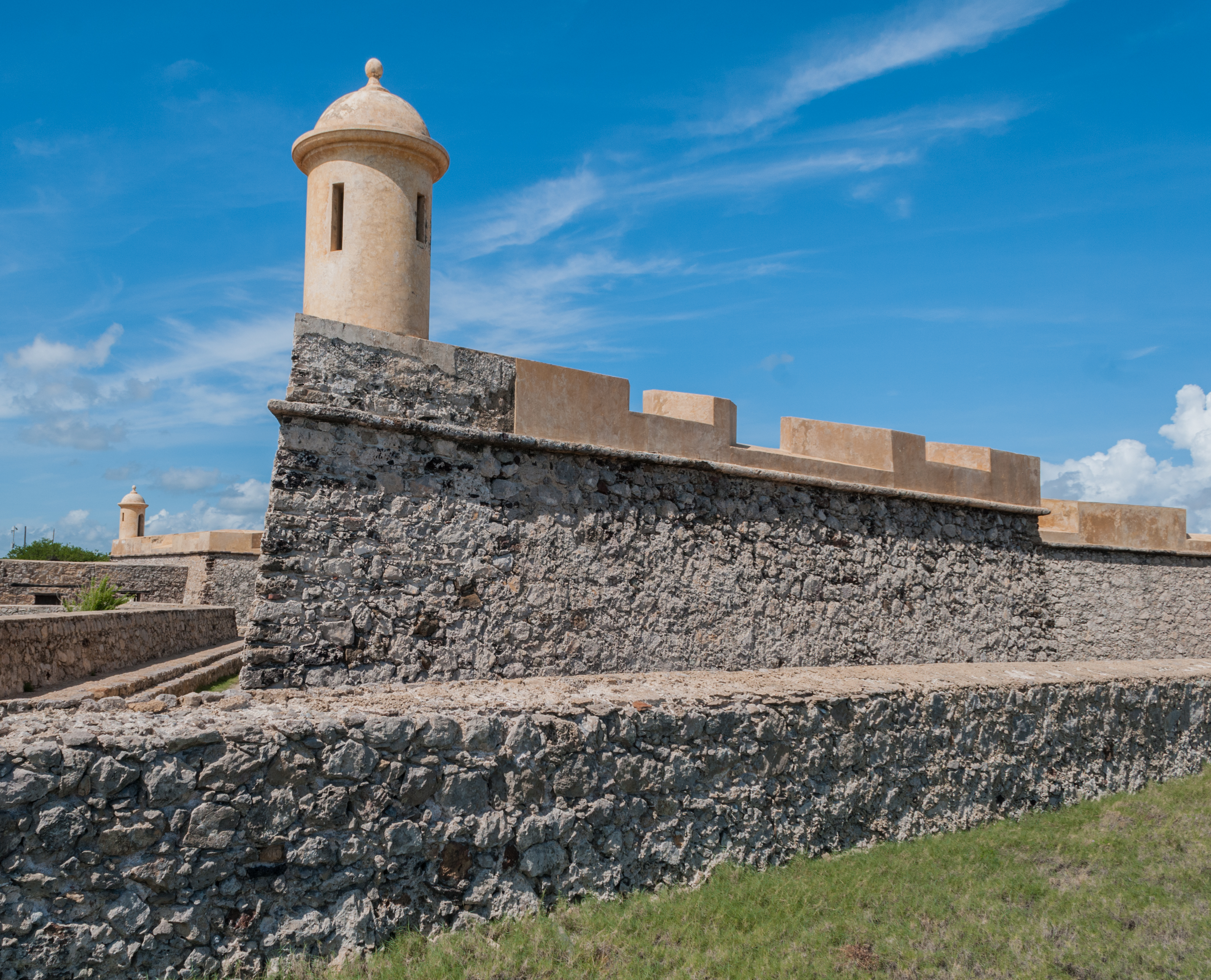
San Carlos de la Barra Castle, Spanish fort guarding the entry to Lake Maracaibo

Maracaibo was repeatedly attacked by European pirates during the 17th century. The Dutch corsair Henrik de Gerard plundered the city in 1614, followed by a British pirate, William Jackson, in 1642. In 1667, the French pirate François l'Olonnais led a fleet of eight ships and 600 men to sack both Maracaibo and nearby Gibraltar, seizing a Spanish treasure ship with cargo that included cacao, gems, and over 260,000 pieces of eight.

In March 1669, Henry Morgan raided Maracaibo and then moved on to Gibraltar. As he attempted to exit the lake, Morgan encountered three Spanish warships—the Magdalena, San Luis, and Soledad—and a fortified Spanish position at the lake's inlet. He destroyed the Magdalena, burned the San Luis using a fireship, and forced the surrender of the Soledad. By staging a fake land assault, Morgan distracted the Spanish and escaped to the Caribbean.

In June 1678, the French privateer Michel de Grammont attacked Maracaibo with six ships and 700 men. After sacking the city, he continued inland to raid smaller towns, including Gibraltar and Trujillo.

=== Venezuelan independence ===
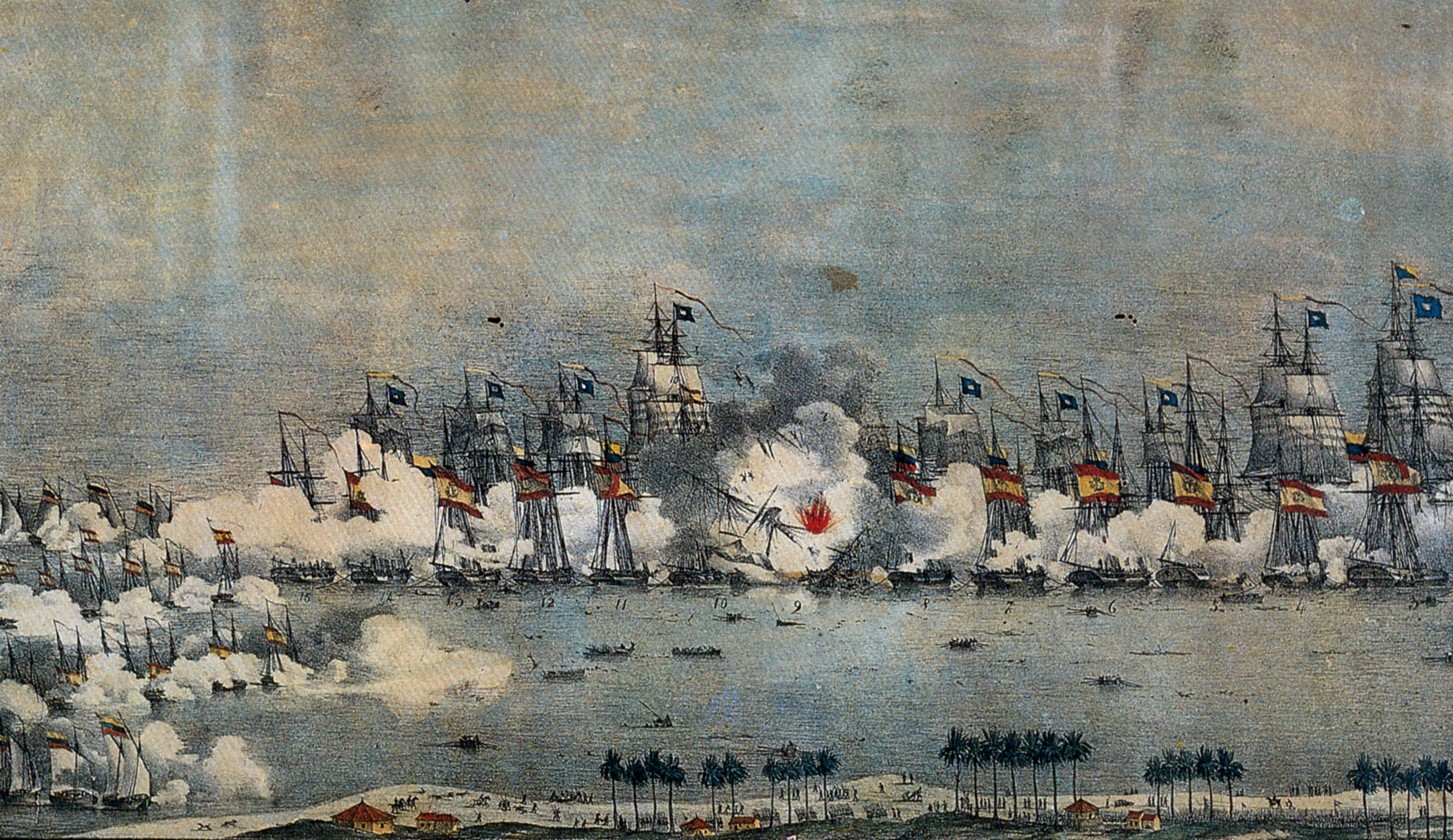
Illustration of the Battle of Lake Maracaibo

In 1810, the Province of Maracaibo remained loyal to the Spanish Crown and did not join the First Republic of Venezuela. The city even briefly served as the seat of the Captaincy General of Venezuela.

By 1821, pro-independence uprisings had spread to the region. Royalist forces under Francisco Tomás Morales fought against patriot troops led by Rafael Urdaneta at the Battle of Juana de Ávila. Morales reestablished Spanish rule in 1822, but was ultimately defeated at the Battle of Lake Maracaibo on 24 July 1823. This decisive victory marked the end of Spanish control in Venezuela.

=== Isolation period ===
For nearly 380 years, Maracaibo remained relatively isolated from the rest of Venezuela. Transportation to the city was primarily via Lake Maracaibo, using boats and ferries. As a result, commercial and cultural exchanges were more active with the Caribbean Sea—particularly with the Dutch Antilles, Colombian coastal cities, Cuba, Hispaniola, and later with ports such as Miami, New York, and Hamburg.

This isolation was both a challenge and an advantage. The city's geographic separation contributed to a strong sense of regional identity and independent character among its residents. Throughout history, there have been discussions and folklore surrounding the idea of an independent nation called the "República Independiente del Zulia" ("Independent Republic of Zulia"), although such a state has never materialized.

By the early 20th century, the introduction of motorized transport increased traffic in manufactured goods and agricultural products through the city port. However, ferries were still required to cross the lake, and the eastern shore remained poorly connected to the national road system. As a result, Maracaibo's economy continued to align more closely with Colombia and the Caribbean than with eastern Venezuela.

In January 1903, during the Venezuelan crisis and naval blockade under President Cipriano Castro, the German gunboat SMS Panther attempted to enter Lake Maracaibo, a hub of German commercial activity. On 17 January, it exchanged fire with Fort San Carlos but withdrew after 30 minutes due to shallow waters. The Venezuelan government declared the incident a defensive success. In response, the German cruiser SMS Vineta bombarded the fort on 21 January, destroying it and killing 25 civilians in the nearby town.

In 1908, during the second Castro crisis, the Dutch warships Friesland, Gelderland, and Jacob van Heemskerck were deployed to patrol the Venezuelan coast. The Friesland was tasked with guarding the entrance to Maracaibo.

=== Construction of the General Rafael Urdaneta Bridge ===
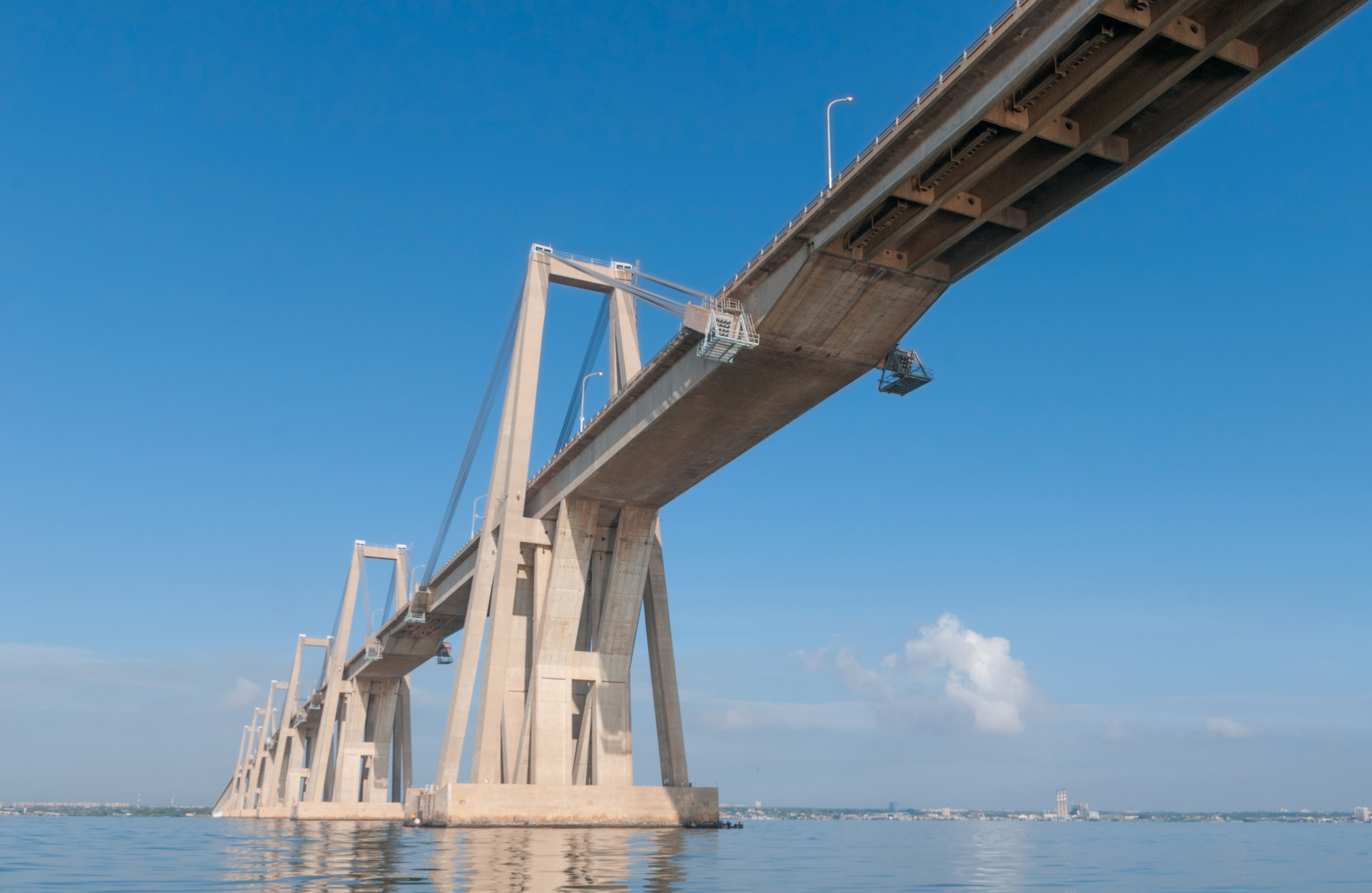
Maracaibo Lake Bridge

The dictatorial regime of General Marcos Pérez Jiménez in the 1950s set as a goal the construction of a bridge connecting the two shores of Lake Maracaibo. Various proposals for spanning the narrows near the city were in development. The government aimed to better integrate this "city of independent thought" with the rest of the country. Proposals for a bridge design including rail transport and tourist infrastructure were seriously considered. After Pérez Jiménez was overthrown on 23 January 1958, the newly installed democratic administration approved a simpler but still ambitious project.

Construction of the General Rafael Urdaneta Bridge (Puente General Rafael Urdaneta) began shortly thereafter. Named after the independence hero, the prestressed concrete bridge officially opened to public traffic in 1962, linking Maracaibo with Zulia's eastern shore and the national highway network. The bridge was completed on schedule in just 40 months and became the longest prestressed concrete bridge in the world at the time.

The construction of the bridge was a remarkable engineering achievement. Built under challenging conditions, it became the longest prestressed concrete bridge in the world at the time of its completion. Today, it remains in constant use and serves as the most vital link between Maracaibo, the eastern region of Zulia, and the rest of Venezuela.

In April 1964, just two years after its inauguration, the 8.7 km bridge was severely damaged when the supertanker Esso Maracaibo lost steering due to an electrical failure and struck pier 31, causing a 259 m section of the roadway to collapse into the lake. Four vehicles plunged into the water, resulting in the deaths of seven people; remarkably, there were no crew casualties or major oil spill.

Emergency repairs were completed in approximately six months, and the bridge was restored to service with no compromise to its structural integrity.

=== Contemporary Maracaibo ===
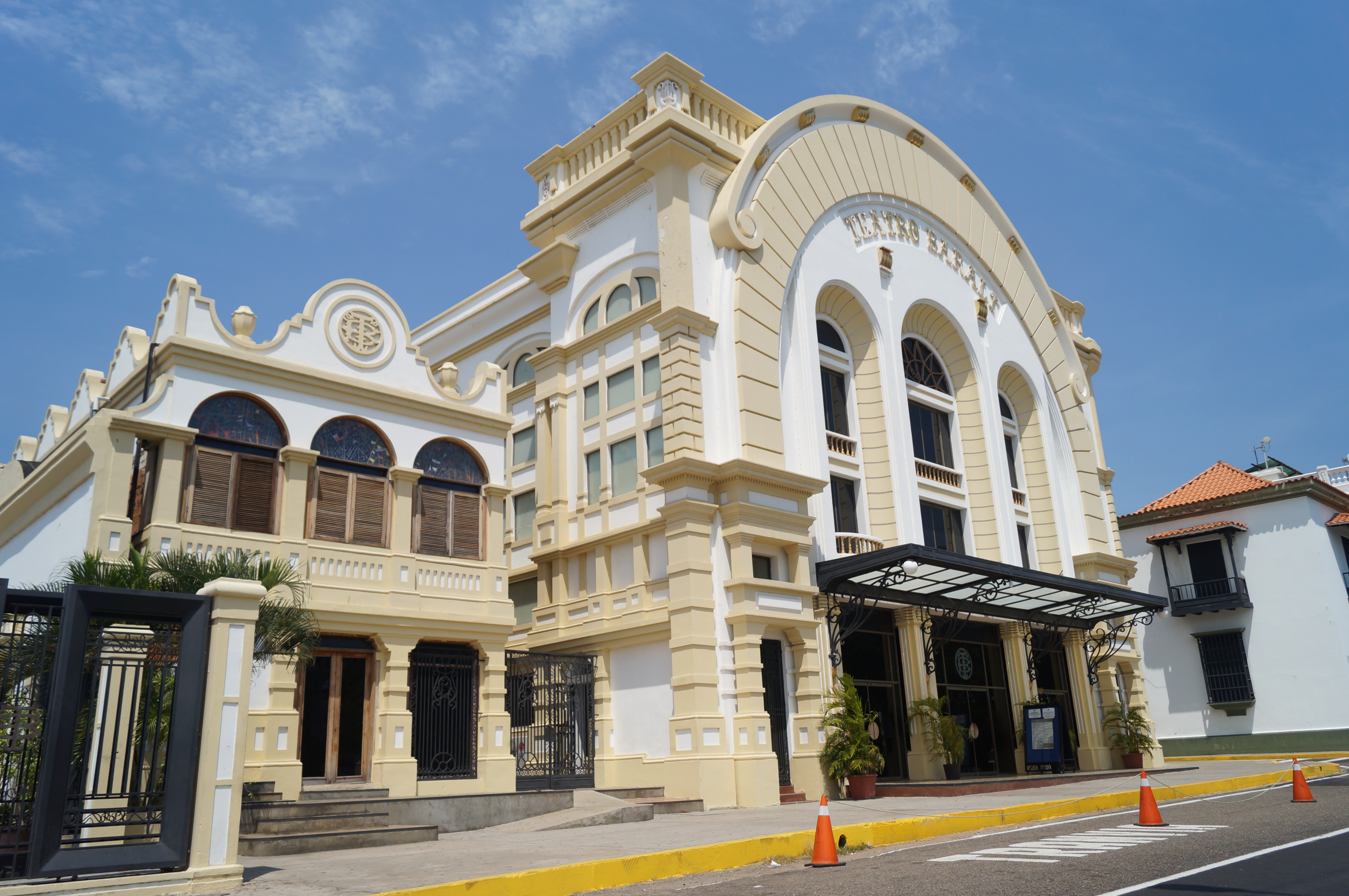
Exterior of Baralt Theatre

François de Pons, a French government agent stationed in Caracas, described the people of Maracaibo in his 1806 travel journal. (de Pons 1806). He noted their maritime skill and military aptitude:

"They perform coasting, or long voyages, with equal facility; and when all trade is suspended by the operations of war, they enter privateers. Bred up in the neighbourhood of the lake, they are mostly all expert swimmers and excellent divers. Their reputation stands equally high as soldiers. Those who do not enter into the sea service, form plantations, or assist in cultivating those that belong to their fathers. Nothing proves better their aptitude for this kind of occupation, than the immense flocks of cattle with which the savannas of Maracaybo [sic] are covered."

He also observed a notable interest in education and culture:

"But what confers the greatest honour on the inhabitants of Maracaibo, is their application to literature; in which, notwithstanding the wretched state of public education, they make considerable progress....They likewise acquired the art of elocution, and of writing their mother tongue with the greatest purity; in a word, they possessed all the qualities that characterise men of letters."

Today, Maracaibo has grown into a major metropolitan area composed of two municipalities: Maracaibo and San Francisco, the latter established in 1995. The city has attracted internal migration from rural areas and other urban centers, including Caracas, due to economic and cultural factors.

Maracaibo is home to several major institutions of higher education. The public University of Zulia (LUZ) is one of the most prestigious in the country, particularly recognized for its law, medicine, and engineering programs. It was once considered one of the most prestigious institutions in Latin America, particularly before the country's economic and political decline in the 21st century. Other notable universities include Universidad Rafael Belloso Chacín (URBE) and Universidad Rafael Urdaneta, the latter known for its strong psychology department. However, the broader national crisis has significantly impacted academic operations, especially at public institutions like LUZ.

The Diocese of Maracaibo, established on 23 July 1965, was elevated to an archdiocese on 30 April 1966 by Pope Paul VI. Pope John Paul II visited the city in 1985. Since November 2000, the archdiocese has been headed by Archbishop Ubaldo Ramón Santana Sequera.

In 2019, widespread poverty and national power outages triggered a wave of violence and looting across the city. The resulting instability accelerated mass emigration, with many residents relocating abroad—particularly to the United States.

In mid‑2020, the COVID‑19 pandemic further strained Maracaibo's healthcare system, as the city's University Hospital became overwhelmed with patients. Staff reported daily deaths far exceeding official figures, indicating systemic collapse in local medical services.

In early 2023, Maracaibo became the focus of a local solar‑energy pilot by Zulia Solar, which aims to install rooftop solar panels on 400 homes and 100 apartments to help residents cope with persistent blackouts.

== Economy ==
Maracaibo has one of the country's largest seaports, serving as a key export terminal for crude oil and general cargo. All of Venezuela's foreign commerce is carried by sea, and Maracaibo ranks among its top three ports alongside Puerto Cabello and La Guaira.

The Lake Maracaibo basin supplies roughly two‑thirds of Venezuela's total petroleum output, making it the country's primary oil-producing region.

Beyond oil and farming, Maracaibo also supports significant petrochemical industries (producing chemicals, textiles, cement, soap and food products), has one of Venezuela's busiest seaports (enhanced by the 1950s dredging of the lake channel), and a robust service sector—spanning banking, education, healthcare, and tourism—that employs around 75% of the workforce.

== Geography ==
The municipality of Maracaibo is divided into 18 parishes, as shown below:

Political Territorial Division of Maracaibo Parroquia Antonio Borjas Romero Bolívar Cacique Mara Caracciolo Parra Pérez Cecilio Acosta Chiquinquirá Coquivacoa Cristo de Aranza Francisco Eugenio Bustamante Idelfonso Vásquez Juana de Ávila Luis Hurtado Higuera Manuel Dagnino Olegario Villalobos Raúl Leoni San Isidro Santa Rosalía Venancio Pulgar

=== Districts ===
- Venancio Pulgar
- Idelfonso Vázquez
- Coquivacoa
- Barrio 18 de Octubre
- Juana de Ávila
- El Naranjal
- San Jacinto (La Marina)
- Mara Norte
- La Trinidad
- Las Tarabas
- La Estrella
- Maracaibo I
- Maracaibo II
- Lago Mar Beach
- Antonio Borjas Romero
- San Isidro
- Francisco Eugenio Bustamante
- San Rafael
- Ziruma
- San Miguel
- Luis Hurtado Higuera
- Manuel Dagnino
- Cristo de Aranza
- Cecilio Acosta
- Cacique Mara
- El Amparo
- Raúl Leoni
- Caracciolo Parra Pérez
- Los Olivos
- Chiquinquirá
- Santa Lucía
- Santa Rosa
- Bolívar
- Bella Vista
- Historic zone of Maracaibo
- El Saladillo
- Isla Dorada

=== Climate ===
Maracaibo is one of the hottest cities in both Venezuela and South America. Due to the rain shadow effect of the Sierra Nevada de Santa Marta, the city experiences a hot semi-arid climate (Köppen: BSh) moderated somewhat by the presence of Lake Maracaibo. The average historical temperature is approximately 29 °C (84.2 °F). In the past, the combination of high temperatures and humidity along the lake's coast made the region unhealthy, but modern urban development and pest control have significantly reduced such health concerns. The highest recorded temperature in the city is 43.6 °C (110.5 °F), while the lowest is 18.8 °C (65.8 °F).

Climate data for Maracaibo (1991–2020, extremes 1961–2020)
Month	Jan	Feb	Mar	Apr	May	Jun	Jul	Aug	Sep	Oct	Nov	Dec	Year
Record high °C (°F)	36.7 (98.1)	39.4 (102.9)	39.0 (102.2)	40.0 (104.0)	39.8 (103.6)	39.6 (103.3)	39.4 (102.9)	42.2 (108.0)	39.0 (102.2)	39.9 (103.8)	37.0 (98.6)	39.5 (103.1)	42.2 (108.0)
Mean daily maximum °C (°F)	33.1 (91.6)	33.3 (91.9)	33.7 (92.7)	34.0 (93.2)	34.2 (93.6)	34.5 (94.1)	34.8 (94.6)	35.1 (95.2)	34.2 (93.6)	33.1 (91.6)	32.7 (90.9)	32.9 (91.2)	33.8 (92.8)
Daily mean °C (°F)	27.0 (80.6)	27.3 (81.1)	27.9 (82.2)	28.7 (83.7)	28.7 (83.7)	29.4 (84.9)	29.4 (84.9)	29.8 (85.6)	28.9 (84.0)	27.9 (82.2)	27.0 (80.6)	27.3 (81.1)	28.3 (82.9)
Mean daily minimum °C (°F)	23.1 (73.6)	23.4 (74.1)	24.1 (75.4)	25.2 (77.4)	25.7 (78.3)	25.7 (78.3)	25.6 (78.1)	25.9 (78.6)	25.5 (77.9)	24.9 (76.8)	24.6 (76.3)	23.8 (74.8)	24.8 (76.6)
Record low °C (°F)	19.2 (66.6)	18.8 (65.8)	20.3 (68.5)	20.7 (69.3)	20.5 (68.9)	20.2 (68.4)	21.0 (69.8)	20.2 (68.4)	20.2 (68.4)	19.8 (67.6)	20.1 (68.2)	18.9 (66.0)	18.8 (65.8)
Average rainfall mm (inches)	5.8 (0.23)	3.6 (0.14)	11.4 (0.45)	41.1 (1.62)	85.5 (3.37)	48.6 (1.91)	31.3 (1.23)	70.1 (2.76)	114.9 (4.52)	122.9 (4.84)	82.3 (3.24)	31.8 (1.25)	649.3 (25.56)
Average rainy days (≥ 1.0 mm)	1.1	1.0	1.5	4.4	7.2	5.4	4.1	6.8	10.5	11.1	7.0	2.9	63.0
Average relative humidity (%)	69.0	68.5	68.0	71.5	73.5	71.0	69.0	69.5	72.0	75.0	73.0	72.0	71.0
Mean monthly sunshine hours	266.6	240.8	244.9	183.0	179.8	201.0	244.9	232.5	192.0	182.9	204.0	238.7	2,611.1
Mean daily sunshine hours	8.6	8.6	7.9	6.1	5.8	6.7	7.9	7.5	6.4	5.9	6.8	7.7	7.2
Source 1: NOAA (sun 1961–1990)
Source 2: Instituto Nacional de Meteorología e Hidrología (humidity 1970–1998)

== Education ==
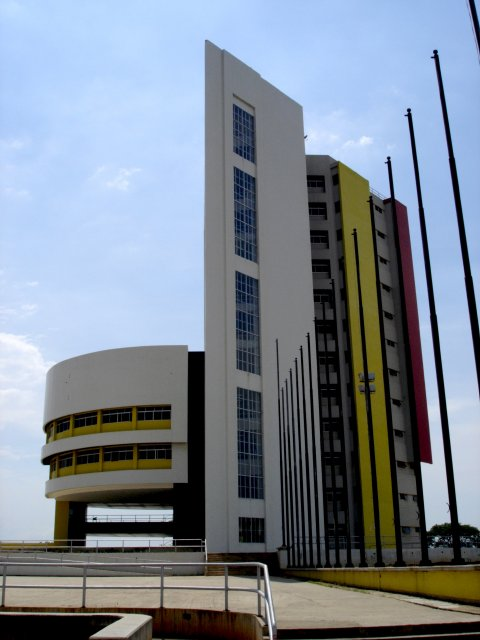
Main Building of the University of Zulia (LUZ)

=== Colleges and universities ===
Several institutions of higher education are based in Maracaibo, including:

- University of Zulia (LUZ) – One of Venezuela's largest public universities, known for its programs in law, medicine, and engineering.
- Universidad Rafael Belloso Chacín (URBE) – A prominent private university recognized for its focus on business, media, and technology.
- Universidad Rafael Urdaneta – A private university with a strong reputation in psychology, architecture, and engineering.
- Universidad Católica Cecilio Acosta – A Catholic institution specializing in humanities, education, and social sciences.
- Universidad Nacional Experimental de la Fuerza Armada (UNEFA) – A public military university with various academic disciplines.
- Universidad Dr. José Gregorio Hernández – A private institution offering a range of undergraduate and graduate programs.
- Universidad Bolivariana de Venezuela, Zulia campus – A public university focused on social missions and government-led programs.
- Universidad Nacional Abierta (UNA), Zulia regional center – Venezuela's national distance learning university, offering flexible programs.

=== International schools ===
- Escuela Bella Vista (American school)
- Colegio Alemán de Maracaibo, formerly Colegio Alemán del Zulia (German school)

== Sports ==
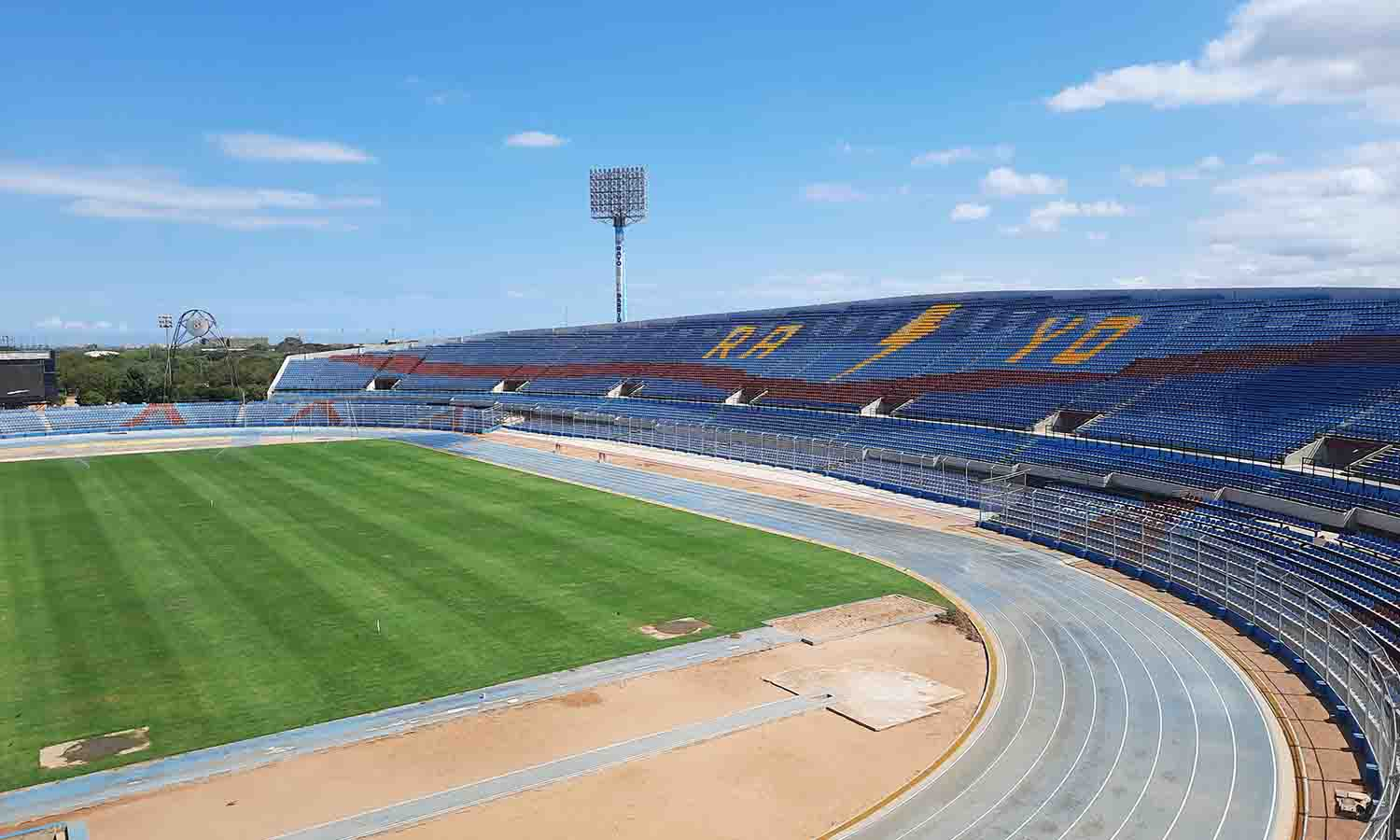
Estadio José Pachencho Romero

=== Baseball ===
Maracaibo is home to the Águilas del Zulia, the state's baseball team in the Venezuelan Professional Baseball League. They play at Luis Aparicio El Grande Stadium and have held exhibition games at Víctor Davalillo Stadium in Cabimas since 2011. The Águilas are one of Venezuela's most popular and successful baseball teams.

=== Football (Soccer) ===
Football has grown in popularity in recent decades. Maracaibo hosted Zulia Fútbol Club, which played in the Primera División from 2005 until 2022, based at the Estadio José Encarnación "Pachencho" Romero. In 2022, the club merged with Deportivo Rayo Zuliano, which continues to represent Maracaibo in the top division. Other teams based in the city include Deportivo JBL del Zulia (Segunda División), and historically clubs like Titanes F.C. and Zulia FC B.

=== Basketball ===
Zulia's top basketball team, Gaiteros del Zulia, is based in Maracaibo. They are four-time champions of the Venezuelan professional league (1984, 1985, 1996, 2001) and play at the Gimnasio Pedro Elías Belisario Aponte in Maracaibo.

=== Rugby ===
Maracaibo is home to the Maracaibo Rugby Football Club, known as the Oil Blacks, one of the earliest rugby teams in Venezuela. The sport was introduced to the city through the influence of the local English-speaking community.

== Culture ==
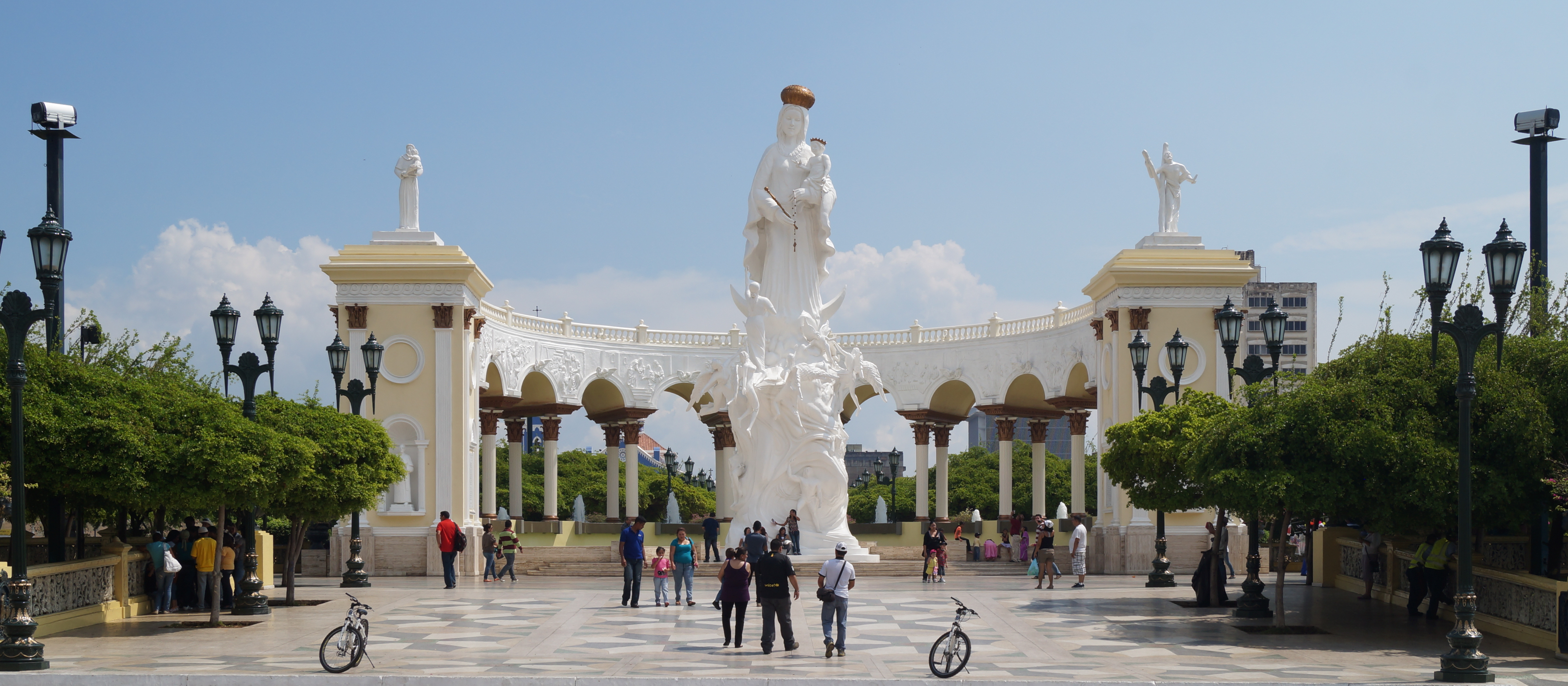
Monument of Our Lady of the Rosary of Chiquinquirá

Culture in Maracaibo maintains strong Indigenous influences, from its gaitas, desserts, style, and other customs. Most major houses of advertising in Venezuela acknowledge how different the culture of Maracaibo is from that of Caracas. Studies of both prove, for example, that Caracas' leading soft drink brand is Coke, while in Maracaibo it is Pepsi. This has made many brands create special localized advertising of their products (including several Pepsi commercials spoken by local celebrities).

The Gaita is a style of Venezuelan folk music from Maracaibo. According to Joan Corominas, it may come from gaits, the Gothic word for "goat", which is the skin generally used for the membrane of the "furro" instrument. Other instruments used in gaita include maracas, cuatro, charrasca and tambora (Venezuelan drum). Song themes range from humorous and love songs to protest songs. The style became popular throughout Venezuela in the 1960s, and it fused with other styles such as salsa and merengue in the 1970s. Famous gaita groups include Maracaibo 15, Gran Coquivacoa, Barrio Obrero, Cardenales del Éxito, Koquimba, Melody Gaita, Guaco, Estrellas del Zulia, Saladillo, and many others.

=== Museums, cultural centers and theaters ===
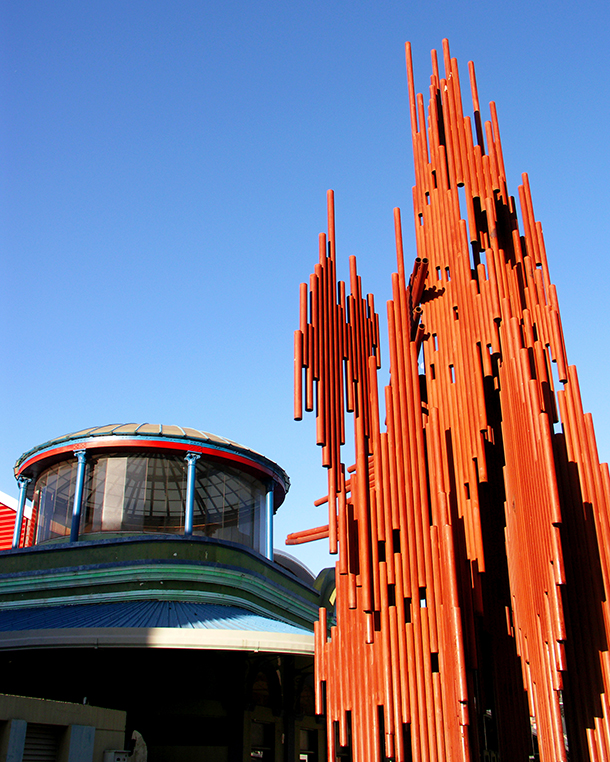
Maracaibo's Lía Bermúdez Art Centre

- Zulia Contemporary Art Museum (MACZUL)
- General Rafael Urdaneta Museum
- "Balmiro León" Municipal Graphic Arts Museum
- Maracaibo's Fine Arts Centre
- Maracaibo's "Lía Bermúdez" Art Centre
- Baralt Theatre
- Museum of the Gaita

=== Libraries ===
- Public Library of Zulia
- "Arturo Uslar Pietri" Public Library
- "Dr. Pedro Alciro Barboza de la Torre" Library
- "Simón Palmar" Public Library
- Biblioteca Pública "Luís Guillermo Pineda Belloso" (De carácter público, bilingüe y circulante)
- "Pedagógica" Specialized Public Library
- "SEDINI" Specialized Public Library
- "Dr. Nectario Andrade Labarca" Private Library

== Notable people ==
- Wilyer Abreu - baseball player
- Teolindo Acosta - baseball player
- José Andrés Martínez - professional MLS soccer player
- Ricardo Aguirre - composer and singer
- Daniel Alvarado - singer and actor
- Junior Alvarado - jockey
- Wilson Álvarez - Major League Baseball left-handed pitcher
- Oswaldo Álvarez Paz - First elected Governor
- Ernesto Aparicio - former shortstop in Venezuelan League Baseball
- Luis Aparicio - shortstop, Major League Baseball Hall of Fame
- Rafael María Baralt - diplomat, writer, philologist, historian
- Jessica Barboza Schmidt - model and beauty pageant
- Omar Barboza- politician
- Huascar Barradas - flutist
- Evert Bastet - Canadian sailor. He won a silver medal in the Flying Dutchman Class at the 1984 Summer Olympics
- Vivian Urdaneta - Miss International 2000
- José Bracho - baseball pitcher
- Lionel Belasco - pianist, composer and bandleader, best known for his calypso recordings
- Marisela Berti - actress, singer, show host and beauty queen
- Silvino Bracho - baseball pitcher
- Antonio Briñez - first manager to win a National Amateur Baseball championship to Venezuela
- María Calcaño - poet
- José Antonio Casanova - baseball player and team manager
- Abel Castellano Jr. - jockey
- Javier Castellano - jockey Eclipse Award 2013, 2014, 2015, 2016. Hall of Fame
- Leopoldo Castillo - journalist. TV host
- Gustavo Chacín - baseball player
- Jackson Chourio - baseball player
- Fernando Chumaceiro - lawyer and politician
- Johana Clavel - cook and entrepreneur
- Luis Contreras - baseball player
- Gilberto Correa - TV host
- David Cubillan - basketball player
- Chiquinquirá Delgado - actress and TV host
- Elías Díaz - MLB baseball player
- Xabier Elorriaga- actor
- Heraclio Fernández - pianist and composer
- Lupita Ferrer - actress
- Juan Fuenmayor - soccer player
- Manuel Gogorza- military
- Betulio González - boxer
- Carlos González - baseball player
- Geremi González - Major League Baseball player for several teams
- Inés González Árraga - chemist and former political prisoner
- Mariana González Parra - fencer
- Ulises Hadjis - singer-songwriter and multi instrumentalist
- Alejandro Hernández - Internet comedian
- Jonathan Herrera - baseball player
- Wilmer Herrison - painter
- Fred Hoos – Canadian field hockey player
- Ender Inciarte - MLB baseball player
- Daniela Larreal - cyclist sprinter
- Ninibeth Leal - Miss World 1991
- Tulio Enrique León - blind organist, composer, and arranger
- Sandy León - MLB baseball player
- Carlos López Bustamante - journalist, known for his opposition to Juan Vicente Gómez
- Eduardo López Bustamante - journalist, lawyer, and poet
- Teresa López Bustamante - journalist, founder of the Catholic Venezuelan newspaper
- Eduardo López Rivas - editor and journalist
- Roberto Lückert León - Roman Catholic prelate
- Betty Cecilia Lugo - philanthropist
- Julio Machado - Major League Baseball pitcher
- Carlos Ramírez MacGregor - journalist, politician and writer
- Domingo Marcucci - shipbuilder and shipowner in San Francisco, California
- Ernesto Mayz Vallenilla - philosopher, rector of Simón Bolívar University (Venezuela)
- Armando Molero - songwriter
- Carlos Molina Tamayo - navy militar
- Ricardo Montaner - Venezuelan musician
- Carmen Maria Montiel - Miss Venezuela 1984, Miss Universe 1984 2nd runner-up
- Carlos Caridad-Montero - film producer
- Humberto Fernández Morán - research scientist, founded the Venezuelan scientific research institute
- Lila Morillo - actress and singer
- Francisco Ochoa - first President of the Universidad del Zulia
- Rougned Odor - MLB baseball player
- Angel Francisco Parra - jockey
- Gastón Parra Luzardo- Economist president of PDVSA in 2002
- Gerardo Parra- MLB baseball player
- Gorgonio Parra - horse trainer
- Nestor Perez Luzardo - lawyer and singer
- Felipe Pirela - singer
- Nick Pocock - former cricketer, ex-captain of Hampshire County Cricket Club
- L. Rafael Reif - electrical engineer and the 17th President of the Massachusetts Institute of Technology
- Graciela Rincón Calcaño - poet
- Luis Romero Petit - baseball player
- Rafael Romero Sandrea - track and field athlete
- Daniel Sarcos - Telemundo TV host
- Jefferson Savarino - footballer
- Mónica Spear - Miss Venezuela 2004, Miss Universe 2005 4th runner-up, actress
- Jorge Schmidke - poet
- Orlando Urdaneta - actor
- Rafael Urdaneta - hero of the Latin American war for independence
- Patricia Van Dalen - painter
- Patricia Velásquez - actress and international top model
- Guillermo Vento - baseball player
- Leonardo Villalobos - actor and television personality

== International relations ==
=== Twin towns – Sister cities ===
Maracaibo is twinned with:

- Bremen, Germany
- Durban, South Africa
- Honolulu, United States
- New Orleans, United States
- Ploiești, Romania
- Istanbul, Turkey
