= 1944 Amateur World Series =

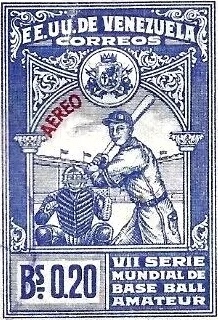

Tournament details
- Country: Venezuela
- Venue: Estadio Cerveza Caracas
- Dates: 12 October – 18 November
- Teams: 8
- Defending champions: Cuba

Final positions
- Champions: Venezuela (2nd title)
- Runners-up: Mexico
- Third place: Cuba
- Fourth place: Panama

Tournament statistics
- Games played: 40*

The 1944 Amateur World Series was the seventh Amateur World Series (AWS), an international men's amateur baseball tournament. The tournament was sanctioned by the International Baseball Federation (which titled it the Baseball World Cup as of the 1988 tournament). The tournament took place, for the first time, in Venezuela. It was contested by four national teams playing twelve games each from October 12 through November 18 in Caracas. Venezuela won their second AWS title, though in controversial fashion.

== Tournament summary ==
Controversy surrounded the tournament with umpiring decisions. The Dominican Republic led Venezuela going into the 9th. In the top of the inning, Venezuela rallied to take the lead. In the bottom of the inning, the umpire called the game early due to bad light, reverting the 9th inning and making the Dominican Republic the winner.

More controversial umpiring played a role in a Cuba–Venezuela game in the final phase of the event. After a Venezuelan errored the ball during a close play at first, a photographer came over and threw the ball to one of the Venezuelan players, which led to an out. The Cuban manager protested the call and was told by the umpires that photographers were allowed to intervene in play. Due to this, Cuba withdrew from the Cup and their remaining game was forfeited; they were credited with a third-place finish nonetheless.

Cuba's withdrawal was closely followed by that of Mexico, who also withdrew from the tournament after more controversial umpiring decisions in favour of Venezuela, forfeiting the final round and finishing second. Mexico manager Chile Gómez declared the umpiring in Venezuela "the worst I've seen."

== Standings ==
First round

Team	W	L
Mexico	6	1
Panama	5	2
Venezuela	5	2
Cuba	4	3
Dominican Republic	4	3
Colombia	2	5
Puerto Rico	1	6
Nicaragua	1	6

Second round

Team	W	L
Cuba	2	1
Mexico	2	1
Venezuela	2	1
Panama	0	3

Final round

Team	W	L
Venezuela *	2	0
Mexico	0	2

* Venezuela won by forfeit.

== Honors and awards ==
=== Statistical leaders ===
Batting leaders
Statistic	Name	Total
Batting average	(Panama) Leonard Roberts	.478
Hits	(Venezuela) Antonio Briñez	19
Runs	(Venezuela) Guillermo Vento	14
Home runs	(Venezuela) Adolfredo González (Mexico) J. Diaz (Mexico) B. López	2
Runs batted in	(Venezuela) Dalmiro Finol	15
Stolen bases	(Colombia) José Araújo	4

Pitching leaders
Statistic	Name	Total
Wins	(Mexico) F. Alcaraz (Dominican Republic) Luis Castro (Venezuela) Luis Zuloaga	3
Earned run average	(Venezuela) Luis Zuloaga	0.94
Strikeouts	(Cuba) Julio Moreno	23

== Bibliography ==
- Bjarkman, P. A History of Cuban Baseball
- Cup History
