= 1941 Amateur World Series =

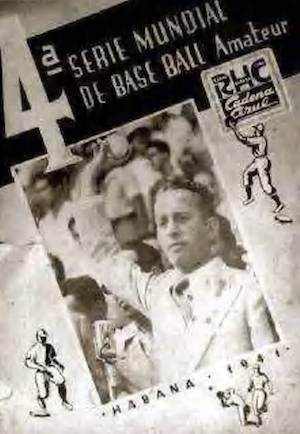
- Poster commissioned by Radio Havana Cuba; IBF president Jaime Mariné is on the cover

Tournament details
- Country: Cuba
- Venue: 1 (in 1 host city)
- Dates: 27 September – 22 October
- Teams: 9
- Defending champions: Cuba

Final positions
- Champions: Venezuela (1st title)
- Runners-up: Cuba
- Third place: Mexico
- Fourth place: Panama

Tournament statistics
- Games played: 36

Awards
- MVP: (Venezuela) José Casanova

The 1941 Amateur World Series was the fourth edition of the Amateur World Series (AWS), an international men's amateur baseball tournament sanctioned by the International Baseball Federation. The tournament took place, for the third consecutive time, in Cuba. It was contested by nine national teams playing eight games each from September 27 through October 22 at the Estadio La Tropical in Havana.

Venezuela won its first major international baseball title, defeating defending champions Cuba in a tie-breaker championship game. The victory is cited as the catalyst for baseball's exploding popularity in Venezuela, and the championship team was hailed as "Los Héroes del '41" ("Heroes of '41").

== Participants and format ==
All teams participated in a single-match round-robin, resulting in eight games for each team. In case of a tie for best record at the end of the round-robin, a single playoff game would be held to determine the overall winner.

The tournament saw the return of all of the new members that had been invited to the 1940 edition, with the exception of Hawaii. Three new national teams were added: El Salvador, Panama, and the Dominican Republic. The appearance of the Panamanian and Dominican teams in particular raised the level of competition in the tournament, according to Roberto González Echevarría.

With the departure of Hawaii, the Amateur World Series would consist exclusively of national teams from the Americas going forward, until Italy and the Netherlands were added for the 1970 edition.

== Tournament summary ==
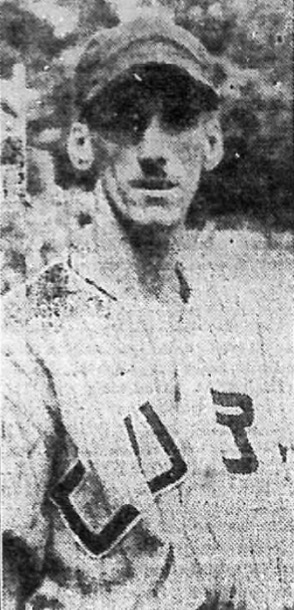
Tony Ordeñana led the tournament in runs

The Cuban national team, which had won the last two tournament, was anchored by a strong pitching staff that was the best of the amateur circuit. Several of these players would go on to professional careers with Major League Baseball, including Rogelio Martínez (who went 2-0 in the tournament with a 0.00 ERA) and Julio Moreno (1-1, 1.29 ERA), who both played with the Washington Senators in the early 1950s. The ace of the staff was Conrado Marrero, who went 3-0 during round-robin play with a very effective 0.46 ERA, though he would suffer the loss in the playoff game. Cuba's batters included Bernardo Cuervo, who hit .400 and led the tournament with 10 runs batted in; Andrés Fleitas (.378), the brother of Senators shortstop Ángel Fleitas; Napoleón Reyes, hitting .343; Clemente González (.395), whop had the most hits in the tournament with 17; and Tony Ordeñana (.256), who led the tournament with 14 runs scored, and would also go on to play a single major league game with the Pittsburgh Pirates in 1943. The team was managed by Joaquín Viego, of the Hershey club.

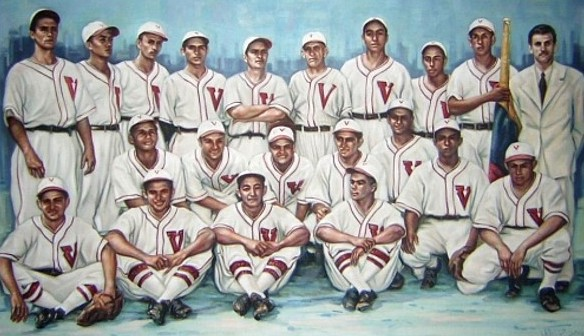
The "Heroes of '41"

The Venezuelan team was largely made up of veterans who had played in the previous series: chief among them Héctor Benítez, who collected at least one hit in each of his nine games and led the series with three triples; José Pérez Colmenares, who drove in five runs and scored 11 times in the nine contests, and Daniel Canónico, who went 4–0 with a 1.69 ERA as the most dominant pitcher in the series. José Antonio Casanova earned the Most Valuable Player award for the tournament. Other players included outfielder Chucho Ramos (a future Cincinnati Red), Dalmiro Finol, who would hit both the first home run in Venezuelan professional baseball (1946) and the first in Caribbean Series history (1949), and Julio Bracho. Most of the players would go on to successful careers in the Venezuelan Professional Baseball League.

Another unexpectedly strong team was Mexico, piloted by Chile Gómez. Mexico's Victor Manuel Canales, who would go on to play for several years in the minor leagues, hit five doubles to lead the tournament. Guillermo Prieto led the tournament in average, going 12-for-22 at the plate and hitting .545, the highest imark to that point in Amateur World Series history. The Dominican team was managed by the legendary Burrulote Rodríguez and included José St. Claire. Panama's León Kellman hit the only home run of the series and would go on to a career in the Negro leagues and Mexican League, while Pat Scantlebury pitched for the team and would go on to have a long Negro leagues career as well as a short stint with the Cincinnati Reds. The United States was mostly represented by players of the Pennsylvania Athletic Club of Philadelphia, managed by Ira F. Thomas; the team included two future major leaguers, pitcher Tal Abernathy and catcher Benny Culp, who would both debut the following year with the Philadelphia Athletics and Phillies, respectively. Beryl Follet, who had previously enjoyed a brief playing career in the National Football League, also made up part of the U.S. pitching staff.

Cuba and Venezuela finished the tournament with identical 7–1 records; Cuba's only defeat was to Venezuela, while Venezuela's only defeat was to the Dominican Republic. Though the Venezuelan federation was reportedly satisfied with being crowned co-champions with Cuba, Cuban organizers pushed for a playoff game, allowing Venezuela's squad an extra few days rest for their ace Canonico. In the tie-breaking championship game on October 22, Canonico went up against Marrero. Venezuela quickly scored three runs in the bottom of the first inning, and Marrero was relieved by Pedro "Natilla" Jiménez. Canonico pitched a scoreless game until the top of the ninth, but the late Cuban rally was not enough to prevent Venezuela from winning the title.

== Venue ==
Havana, Cuba	1941 Amateur World Series is located in Cuba
Gran Stadium Cervecería Tropical	1941 Amateur World Series is located in Cuba
Capacity: 15,000	1941 Amateur World Series is located in Cuba

== Group stage ==
Pos	Team	Pld	W	L	RF	RA	RD	PCT	GB	VEN	CUB	MEX	PAN	DOM	USA	NIC	PRI	SLV
1	Venezuela	8	7	1	56	13	+43	.875	—		4–1	5–2	7–2	2–4	12–1	6–0	12–1	8–2
2	Cuba (H)	8	7	1	60	11	+49	.875	—	1–4		11–1	9–0	4–2	5–4	7–0	7–0	16–0
3	Mexico	8	6	2	48	40	+8	.750	1	2–5	1–11		4–1	6–4	12–8	3–2	4–3	16–6
4	Panama	8	5	3	34	27	+7	.625	2	2–7	0–9	1–4		2–1	4–1	4–1	14–2	7–2
5	Dominican Republic	8	5	3	39	21	+18	.625	2	4–2	2–4	4–6	1–2		6–3	6–0	10–4	6–0
6	United States	8	2	6	34	52	−18	.250	5	1–12	4–5	8–12	1–4	3–6		3–2	14–2	0–9
7	Nicaragua	8	2	6	17	34	−17	.250	5	0–6	0–7	2–3	1–4	0–6	2–3		7–4	5–1
8	Puerto Rico	8	1	7	19	69	−50	.125	6	1–12	0–7	3–4	2–14	4–10	2–14	4–7		3–1
9	El Salvador	8	1	7	21	61	−40	.125	6	2–8	0–16	6–16	2–7	0–6	9–0	1–5	1–3	

Source: Núñez and Méndez, p. 110
(H) Hosts

== Gold medal game ==
October 22, 1941 at Estadio La Tropical in Havana, Cuba
Team	1	2	3	4	5	6	7	8	9	R	H	E
Cuba	0	0	0	0	0	0	0	0	1	1	8	2
Venezuela	3	0	0	0	0	0	0	0	X	3	6	0
WP: Daniel Canónico (4–4) LP: Conrado Marrero (3–1); Núñez and Méndez, p. 105

== Final standings ==
Final Standings
Pos.	Team	W	L	RS	RA
1	Venezuela	8	1	61	
2	Cuba	7	2	63	
Eliminated in group stage
3	Mexico	6	2	51	
4 (Note: Though formally tied in the standings, Panama defeated the Dominican Republic)	Panama	5	3	34	
4	Dominican Republic	5	3	39	
6 (Note: Though formally tied in the standings, the United States defeated Nicaragua)	United States	2	6	35	
6	Nicaragua	2	6	23	
8 (Note: Though formally tied in the standings, Puerto Rico defeated El Salvador)	Puerto Rico	1	7	19	
8	El Salvador	1	7	12	

== Playoffs ==
Playoff Game
1	Venezuela	3
2	Cuba	1

October 22, 1941 14:30 EDT (UTC−4) at Gran Stadium La Tropical in Havana, Cuba
Team	1	2	3	4	5	6	7	8	9	R	H	E
Cuba	0	0	0	0	0	0	0	0	1	1	7	2
Venezuela	3	0	0	0	0	0	0	0	X	3	6	1
WP: Daniel Canónico (5–0) LP: Conrado Marrero (3–1); Boxscore

== Honors and awards ==
=== Statistical leaders ===
Batting leaders
Statistic	Name	Total
Batting average	(Mexico) Guillermo Prieto	.545
Hits	(Cuba) Clemente González	17
Runs	(Cuba) Mosquito Ordeñana	14
Home runs	(Panama) León Kellman	1
Runs batted in	(Cuba) Bernardo Cuervo	10
Stolen bases	(Nicaragua) Carlos Navas	6

Pitching leaders
Statistic	Name	Total
Wins	(Venezuela) Daniel Canónico	4
Earned run average	(Cuba) Rogelio Martínez	0.00
Earned run average	(Cuba) Pedro Jiménez	0.00
Innings pitched	(Venezuela) Daniel Canónico	32
Strikeouts	(United States) Edward Yuengling	13

=== Awards ===
Award	Player	Ref.
Most Valuable Player	(Venezuela) José Antonio Casanova	

== Bibliography ==
- José Antero Núñez; Alfredo Méndez (1991). Oro y Glorias del Beisbol Venezolano. Caracas: JAN Editor.
