= Luis Zuloaga =

- Pitcher
- Born: December 31, 1922; Valencia, Carabobo, Venezuela
- Died: May 23, 2013 (aged 90); Caracas, Venezuela
- Batted: Left Threw: Left

VPBL debut
- 1946, for the Cervecería Caracas

Last VPBL appearance
- 1956, for the Leones del Caracas

Career statistics
- Games pitched: 86
- Win–loss record: 24–14
- Earned run average: 3.94
- Strikeouts: 162
- Innings pitched: 358 2/3

Career highlights and awards
- 2× Baseball World Cup Gold medal (1944–1945); Led BWP in wins (1944–1945) and ERA (1944); Set BWP all-time record for most consecutive win decisions (seven, 1944–1945); Tied for the most wins in the VPBL (1947–1948); Three Caribbean Series appearances (1949, 1952–1953)

Member of the Venezuelan

Baseball Hall of Fame
- Induction: 2009

Luis Zuloaga (December 31, 1922 – May 23, 2013) was a Venezuelan professional baseball pitcher.

Born in Valencia, Carabobo, Zuloaga was a left-handed curveball specialist. He started to be known as El Mono when he entered the Venezuelan Professional Baseball League in its inaugural season of 1946. It was a moniker that he proudly used throughout his life.

Previously, Zuloaga pitched for the Cervecería Caracas of the First Division from 1942 through 1945, then moved with the team when it relocated to the new circuit in 1946. He spent his entire career with the franchise, including when it was called the Leones del Caracas, pitching in the league until the 1955–1956 season.

In addition, Zuloaga represented the Venezuela national team in the Baseball World Cup in 1944 and 1945, leading his team to win Gold medal at both championships. In 1944 he led all pitchers with a 3–0 record and a 0.94 earned run average, and went 4–0 in 1945 to set a tournament all-time record for the most wins, also setting an all-time mark for most consecutive win decisions with his 7–0 undefeated streak at the event.

Zuloaga started slowly with Cervecería in his two first seasons, going 0-2 with a 4.37 ERA (1946) and 5-2, 1.91 (1946–1947). His most productive season came in 1947–1948, when he posted a 10-4 record and a 2.51 ERA in 118 innings of work, leading the league in starts (16) while tying with Vargas' Don Newcombe for the most wins and shutouts (3), and ending third in ERA. On the day after Christmas, Zuloaga hurled the first important single game in Venezuelan league history, a one-hit 5–0 masterpiece for Cervecería against Max Surkont and the Patriotas de Venezuela club, during which he permitted a leadoff single, struck out 10, walked two, and did not allowed a runner to reach second base.

After that he was plagued by an assortment of shoulder and elbow injuries and never recovered his old form. He was used sparingly during the next eight seasons, mostly in relief duty, and retired in 1956. He finished with a 24-14 record and a 3.94 ERA in 358 2/3 innings pitched during his 11 seasons in the league. Previously, he went 7-3 with a 3.35 ERA in 21 pitching appearances for Cervecería while playing in First Division.

Zuloaga also was a member of three Caracas champion teams. As the league champions, Cervecería represented Venezuela in the inaugural Caribbean Series played in Cuba in 1949. In Game 5, Zuloaga won a complete-game pitching duel against Puerto Rico's Alonzo Perry and the Indios de Mayagüez by a score of 5–3.

He returned to the Series in 1952 and 1953, basically as a reliever for Cervecería and the Leones, respectively. In 1952 he blanked Panama's Carta Vieja Yankees in one inning of work. Then, in 1953 he hurled six innings of shutout ball against Puerto Rico's Cangrejeros de Santurce (two) and Cuba's Leones de la Habana (four).

In four series appearances, Zuloaga went 1–0 with 11 strikeouts and a 1.69 ERA in 16 innings of work.

Following his playing retirement, Zuloaga joined forces with fellow Venezuelan shortstop Chico Carrasquel and opened Deportes Carrasquel Zuloaga, which became one of the most successful sporting goods retail store in Venezuela.

Besides baseball, Zuloaga participated in numerous activities including soccer, volleyball, softball, track and field, basketball, golf and was a member of various multi-cultural clubs and mission groups. Thanked with the sport that allowed him to have a healthy sporting life, in 1962 Zuloaga founded along with José Del Vecchio and some friends the Criollitos de Venezuela, a local little league corporation that operates not only as a baseball academy but as a means of integral formation of children and adolescents through sport. Former Criollitos ballplayers have played in professional baseball, including big leaguers Bobby Abreu, Cris Colón, Bo Díaz, Andrés Galarraga, Freddy García, Carlos Hernández, Pablo Sandoval, Luis Sojo and Omar Vizquel.

In 2009, Zuloaga gained induction into the Venezuelan Baseball Hall of Fame and Museum as part of their 7th class. Then, in 2011 the Criollitos de Venezuela organization was inducted in the Venezuelan Sports Hall of Fame.

Luis Zuloaga died in 2013 in Caracas, Venezuela, at the age of 90.
