= Luis García (third baseman) =

Venezuelan baseball player (1929–2014)

- Third baseman / Manager
- Born: September 11, 1929; Carúpano, Sucre, Venezuela
- Died: January 9, 2014 (aged 84); Caracas, Venezuela
- Batted: Right Threw: Right

Teams
- Minor Leagues: Concord Nationals (1949); Potros de Tijuana (1950–1951); Aberdeen Pheasants (1952); Tampa Smokers (1953); Charleston Senators (1953); Havana Sugar Kings (1954–1955); Mexico Leagues: Leones de Yucatán (1956–1957); Petroleros de Poza Rica (1958–1963); Aguilas de Veracruz (1965); Venados de Yucatán (1966); Venezuela Leagues: Navegantes del Magallanes (1949–1956; 1964–1969); Indios de Oriente (1956–1959; 1960–1963); Rapiños de Occidente (1959–1960); Estrellas Orientales (1963–1964); Leones del Caracas (1969–1970); Tiburones de La Guaira (1970–1971)

Career highlights and awards
- 1959 Caribbean Series champion bat; Caribbean Series All-Star; Caribbean Series all-time leader in doubles, runs and games; 2× league's champion bat (VEN : 1956–1957; 1964–1965); 3× leader in RBI (VEN : 1952–1953; 1960–1961; 1966–1967); 2× leader in fielding average (MEX : 1958; 1961); Champion manager (MEX : 1961); Eight Caribbean Series appearances (1950–1952; 1954–1955; 1957; 1959–1960); Rookie of the Year Award (VEN : 1949–1950); All-time record holder for the most consecutive games played (VEN : 1949–1956); All-time record holder for the most consecutive games played at third base (VEN : 1949–1953); Caribbean Baseball Hall of Fame (2000); Venezuelan Baseball Hall of Fame and Museum (2003); Latino Baseball Hall of Fame (2011); Navegantes del Magallanes Hall of Fame (2012); Navegantes del Magallanes uniform number retired (2012)

Member of the Venezuelan

Baseball Hall of Fame
- Induction: 2003
Medals
Men's baseball
Representing Venezuela
Latin American Series
Silver medal – second place	1952 Caracas	Team

Luis García Beltrán (September 11, 1929 – January 9, 2014) was a Venezuelan professional baseball player and manager. Listed at 5 ft 11 in (1.80 m), 189 lb (86 kg), he batted and threw right handed.

At an early age García was dubbed Camaleón by his family, and he carried this nickname throughout his professional career, which spanned 22 years.

He was born in Carúpano, located in the eastern coastal area of Sucre state in Venezuela. Despite his short, stocky build, he was a gifted athlete, enabling him to become the natural leader in pickup games and later in school. He was also a dependable third baseman and, he had the ability to hit the ball to all fields, regardless of size or capacity. Owner of a strong throwing arm, he had good range, being able to catch fly balls from his left field and infield teammates.

García played in the Chicago White Sox, Cincinnati Reds, St. Louis Browns and Washington Senators Minor League systems, but never appeared in a major league game for either club. His career was largely associated with the Navegantes del Magallanes club of the Venezuelan Professional Baseball League, but he also had a distinguished career in the Mexican League in a span of ten seasons.

A member of four Hall of Fame organizations, García amassed more than 3000 hits, appeared in eight Caribbean Series, was the first player to reach 1,000 hits in Venezuelan baseball, and also set several records in the VPBL that still remain intact.

== Professional career ==
=== Minor Leagues ===
García became a professional as a 19-year-old in 1949, while playing for the Senators Class D team in Concord, North Carolina. He collected 92 hits in 381 at-bats for a .241 batting average in 109 games, including 12 doubles, four triples, and one home run. At the end of the season he began a long career in his native Venezuela, but also kept playing in the minor leagues for the next six years.

From 1950 to 1951, García played with the Potros de Tijuana of the independent Sunset League, compiling for them batting averages of .265 and .273 respectively.

In 1952, García joined the Aberdeen Pheasants, a Northern League affiliate of the St. Louis Browns organization. He appeared in 126 games for Aberdeen, batting .288 (125–for-469) with 219 total bases for a .467 slugging percentage, to finish sixth in total bases and eight both in hits and home runs (15).

This season also marked the professional debut of Hank Aaron, who hit .336 (116-for-345) with nine homers and amassed 170 total bases in 87 games for the Eau Claire Bears.

García opened 1953 with the Tampa Smokers of the Florida International League, appearing for them in 81 games before being traded to the Chicago White Sox. He was promoted to the Charleston Senators of the American Association, the Triple A team in the White Sox minors system. García hit .279 and 13 home runs in 155 games for both teams, but his road to the Major Leagues was long and winding.

Discouraged for a time, García persevered, playing two solid but unspectacular seasons for the Havana Sugar Kings of the International League, by then a Triple A affiliate of the Cincinnati Reds. From 1954 to 1955 he was a regular at third base for the Sugar Kings, sharing infield duties with first basemen Julio Bécquer and Nino Escalera; second basemen Pompeyo Davalillo, Danny Morejón and Don Nicholas, and shortstop Johnny Lipon, all of them with major league experience. García posted a slash line (BA/OBP/SLG) of .222/.281/.572 with four home runs and 47 RBI in his first season, and hit .253/.365/.380 with 12 homers and 53 RBI the next year.

After that, García accepted a more attractive offer to play in the Mexican League in 1956. During the winter, he continued to play regularly in the Venezuelan League.

=== Mexican baseball ===
The 1956 summer season brought García to the Mexican League, where he played through 1965 for the Leones de Yucatán, Petroleros de Poza Rica and Aguilas de Veracruz.

In a 10-season career he posted a .322 average with 171 home runs and 759 RBI in 1,124 games, while collecting 1,346 hits and a .507 slugging percentage, establishing himself as one of the most prolific hitters in Mexican baseball history.

García batted over .300 in seven consecutive years from 1957 to 1963, averaging .334 in this period with a career-high .364 in 1958. His most fruitful season came in the 1964 campaign with Veracruz, when he hit a solid .299 and registered career numbers in home runs (29), RBI (108), runs (81) and total bases (251).

As third baseman/manager for Poza Rica, García led all players at his position in fielding percentage in 1958 and 1961, and managed the team to an 84–62 record in 1959 to win the Mexican League pennant. In addition, he twice hit three home runs in a single game and was a seven-time All-Star.

García played later for the Porteños de Nuevo México of the Mexican Southeast League in 1966. It was his last season held outside of Venezuela.

=== Venezuelan Professional Baseball League ===
==== Navegantes del Magallanes (1st stage) ====
Following his minor league debut with the Concord Nationals, the 19-year-old Camaleón García would play in 12 of his 22 professional seasons with the Navegantes del Magallanes.

García joined Magallanes during the 1949–1950 VPBL season in a game against the Cervecería Caracas club. Nervous in his first appearance, due to the historic rivalry between the two teams, he had to face Alejandro Carrasquel; a 37-year-old veteran and former Washington Senators pitcher, as well as the first Venezuelan player to wear a major league uniform. The young García went 2-for-4 against Carrasquel and recorded an RBI in the 5–2 victory over Caracas, quickly gaining the trust of Magallanes manager Lázaro Salazar, who gave him a place in the starting lineup as everyday third baseman. Then, on November 29, 1949, Camaleón began a long string of consecutive games played that would extend over the next four years.

Even though he batted just .247 in 41 games as a rookie, García collected 39 hits in 138 at-bat appearances, including 10 doubles and two home runs, while driving in 22 runs and scoring 28 more. He earned VPBL Rookie of the Year honors in his first season, while Magallanes won its first pennant in the league and represented Venezuela in the 1950 Caribbean Series. García batted .211 in the Series, being the only Magallanes player to either hit a home run or steal a base in the tournament.

In 1950–1951 García enjoyed a good season at the plate, hitting .292 with nine doubles, three triples and five homers in 53 games. He also had 27 RBI and scored 32 runs, while slugging .491 and leading Magallanes to its second straight pennant. He went 5-for-20 in the 1951 Caribbean Series, including five runs and four RBI, and hit a solo home run to prevent a shutout by Cuban pitcher Bill Ayers in Game 6 of the series.

Notably, García faced though pitching in the early going with the likes of Babe Birrer, José Bracho, Dick Starr, Sandy Ullrich, Roy Welmaker and Lenny Yochim, for name a few. Nevertheless, he delivered rewarding results in the years to come, earning respect as a dangerous hitter with runners in scoring position, particularly during the late innings.

García improved further in 1951–1952, when he batted .336 with three homers, 20 doubles and 40 RBI, while topping the league with 87 hits and 120 total bases, being surpassed only by Caracas' Wilmer Fields in average (.348), RBI (45) and doubles (22). Nearly the end of the season, he set a league's all-time record for the most at bats in an extra-inning game with nine at-bat appearances. This record would be matched by Eric Anthony in 1992 and Oscar Salazar in 1999. He later played as a reinforcement for the Cervecería Caracas champion team in the 1952 Caribbean Series, but Camaleón had a disappointing performance that time, going hitless in 13 at bats in six Series games.

García enjoyed another solid season in 1952–1953, batting .327 and leading the league with eight home runs, 47 RBI and 45 runs scored. He also amassed 80 hits, 16 doubles, four triples, and a career-high eight stolen bases, while collecting a best 128 total bases in 245 at-bats for a league's second-best .522 slugging percentage. Frank Baldwin of the Sabios de Vargas collected 112 TB in 205 AB for a best .546 SLG.

On February 14, 1953 García ended his streak of 195 consecutive game appearances at third base, ending the string that began on November 29, 1949. Nevertheless, he pinch-hit a RBI-single in this game, to preserve his string of consecutive games played. Even so, he missed the 1953 Caribbean Series, ending a stretch of three straight years in the event.

A skilled and natural hitter, García endured a good season in 1953–1954. He posted career-highs with 11 home runs and 52 RBI, hit .303 and slugged .479, but did not rank high in any of the offensive categories. That season was dominated by strong pitching, headed by four men in search of the Pitcher of the Year Award: Magallanes' Ramón Monzant (14-6, 132 strikeouts, 2.88 ERA) and George Spencer (10-6, 75 SO, 2.59 ERA), as well as Pastora's Thornton Kipper (14-5, 72 SO, 2.96 ERA) and Howie Fox (11-8, 75 SO, 3.34 ERA). García later played with the Pastora champion club in the 1954 Caribbean Series, topping the team with a .348 average, a .567 slugging, two doubles and a homer, while leading all Series hitters with nine RBI.

Magallanes won the 1954–1955 pennant, four games ahead, en route to the 1955 Caribbean Series. With Lázaro Salazar at the helm, the team received strong pitching support from Ramón Monzant, who posted an 11-7 record and headed the league in ERA (2.00), strikeouts (98) and innings pitched (153⅓). Besides, Bob Lennon provided a consistent batting presence, leading the circuit with nine home runs and 37 RBI. For his part, Camaleón contributed with a .289 average and slugged .403, as he extended his string of consecutive games played to 341. He also batted eight doubles, five homers and 20 RBI, while his 32 runs tied him with Patriotas' Dave Pope for the most in the league. In the Series, he went 6-for-21 (.286) with two doubles, two runs, two RBI, and one stolen base.

García had a modest season for Magallanes in 1955–1956, when he collected a .278 average and slugged .356 in a disappointing season for the club, which finished last in the four-team league. He connected 60 hits in 216 at bats, including nine doubles, one triple and two home runs, while scoring 24 runs with 27 RBI. Finally, on February 5, 1956, he took a day off and ended his string of consecutive games played at 378, setting a league's record that is still unbeaten.

==== Indios de Oriente ====
The Magallanes franchise was sold before the 1956–1957 season and was renamed the Indios de Oriente. Both García and Monzant continued with the new team. This time, Camaleón anchored the offensive for the last-place Indios, leading the team with 65 hits, 13 doubles, 33 RBI and 28 runs, while batting .302, a .463 slugging, three triples, and four home runs in 215 at bats.

García then finished the 1957–1958 season averaging a team-best .335 (53-for-158) for second-place Oriente and also posted a league-best 14 doubles. He scored 24 runs and hit two triples, two homers and 20 RBI, as well a .487 slugging, which was also a team-best and the second of the league behind Caracas' John Roseboro (.500).

Managed by Kerby Farrell, Oriente clinched the 1958–1959 championship title and played in the 1959 Caribbean Series. García helped his team with a .296 average (53-for-179), slugged .380, and collected six doubles, three triples and one homer, driving in 31 runs while scoring 22 times. He then hit .417 (10-for-24) in the Series, tying teammate Jesús Mora for the batting title, and also led the tournament with three doubles and six runs; slugged .625, and hit one triple with three RBI and one stolen base. Besides, teammate Norman Cash batted .360, and was the leader in RBI (11), home runs (2) and slugging (.680), being named Most Valuable Player of the Series. The top hurler was Babe Birrer, who led all pitchers in wins (2-0), strikeouts (18) and ERA (1.25), including a 13-inning complete game victory. As a result, Birrer, Cash, García and Mora made the All-Star team. This was the first time in Caribbean Series history in which four Venezuelan players made the All-Star team in the same year. Notably, Farrell and the Indios, with a low-profile club, came in on an honourable second place.

The 1959–1960 VPBL season was suspended on December 24, 1959, because of a players' strike. In limited action, García hit .286 with 10 RBI, one double, eight runs and one stolen base, in just 28 games. Then, he moved temporarily to the Rapiños de Occidente of the neighbor Zulian League for the rest of the season, hitting a paltry .246 with three homers and six RBI in 15 games.

The Rapiños, who claimed the league's championship, were invited to participate in the 1960 Caribbean Series to compensate for the absence of the VPBL representative team. Once more, Camaleón responded in the way his team expected, as he batted .333 (8-for-24) with four doubles and one home run; drove in five runs and scored five times, while slugging a solid .625 through the six games of the tournament. It was his last participation in the Caribbean Series. During his eight series he set all-time records in games (46), runs (23) and doubles (12), that have not yet been surpassed.

Once the VPBL resumed in 1960–1961, García was a key contributor for Oriente, hitting predominantly in the fourth spot in the line-up. He finished strongly, batting a .283 average with seven homers and 31 RBI in 52 games, including 53 runs, nine doubles, 27 runs, one steal, and a .444 slugging. He also led the league in RBI and finished second in home runs, being surpassed only by Licoreros de Pampero outfielder Don Lock (10), who in turn was a runner-up to García in RBI (28). The Indios advanced to the playoffs, but lost the semifinal round to the eventual champions Industriales de Valencia.

García had a subpar season in 1961–1962, when he hit .273 with eight doubles, three homers, 17 runs and 26 RBI in 52 games, even though he led his team in RBI and was third in doubles. This time Oriente finished in second place, but lost the championship series to the Leones del Caracas. Nonetheless, the team declined considerably in 1962–1963, posting an 8–25 record before folding during the midseason. As a result, García was limited for the second time in his last four seasons, appearing in 32 games, and hitting .309 with seven doubles, one homer, 16 RBI and nine runs scored.

==== Indios Orientales ====
The Oriente franchise was renamed and restructured to become the Indios Orientales for the 1963–1964 season. The Estrellas hired George Genovese as their manager, and the roster included solid players as Steve Bailey, Carl Boles, Eli Grba, Jack Hiatt, Aaron Pointer and Dick Simpson. Meanwhile, García hit .263, slugged .350, and led the team with 21 RBI and nine doubles. He also scored 12 runs, smashed one home run, and stole one base. Nonetheless, his production and the changes did not create a more competitive team, as they finished in last place. At the end of the year, the franchise owners acquired the brand Magallanes and returned to the following season.

==== Navegantes del Magallanes (2nd stage) ====
In 1964–1965, the Navegantes de Magallanes returned as a new franchise with the old colors, records and a new ballpark. Magallanes retained the services of some Orientales players as Chico Carrasquel, José Bracho, Látigo Chávez, Oswaldo Blanco and, of course, Camaleón García.

The Navegantes hired Sparky Anderson as their skipper. Anderson came with a five-year experience while managing in the Milwaukee Braves, Washington Senators, Detroit Tigers, St. Louis Cardinals and Cincinnati Reds minor league systems, But Anderson did not get all the success he wanted. After a 2-1 start, the team lost 13 straight games and he was replaced by the veteran infielder Carrasquel, who also had managed the Indios and Orientales in the previous seasons.

Then, after being dismissed, the future Hall of Fame manager defended himself in a press conference, arguing that the club was badly organised, for having players that never played together before. Anderson added that to improve the team, the owners should strengthen the relationship between players and coaches, not make any difference. Also, they gave me a group of local veteran players almost gone from baseball, and rookies with little professional experience, he explained earnestly.

Nevertheless, this time Camaleón experimented one of his most productive seasons in the league while playing for the Magallanes. The club finished with a 13–37 record, 18 games out of contention, being unable to overcome an awful start. In comparison, García claimed the batting crown with a .394 average, playing in 49 of the 50 games of his team, hitting 65-for-165 with five doubles, four home runs, 14 runs and 30 runs batted in, while collecting 82 total bases for a third-best .497 slugging, behind Caracas teammates Ken Harrelson (.557) and Pete Rose (.503).

In 1965–1966, García played in all 60 regular season games and one tie-breaking contest in the now six-team league. The 36-year-old veteran hit .295 for Magallanes, including nine doubles, three home runs, 30 RBI and 18 runs. Magallanes advanced to the postseason, losing the first round to the eventual champions Tiburones de La Guaira. García batted .375 (9-for-24) with one run and four RBI in the five playoff games.

García showed once more his consistency in the 1966–1967 season, playing in all 60 regular season games and two tie-breaking games for Magallanes, even though his team did not advance this time. In the same way, García provided his usual hitting production, collecting a .286 average, 17 runs, 10 doubles, two triples, one home run, and led the league with 40 RBI, also a second career best.

But at 38, Camaleón had trouble keeping up with the workload required. In 1967–1968, he saw limited action after injuring the Achilles tendon early in the season. Overall, he played in 11 games and went 4-for-19 (.211) with one RBI, being mostly used as a pinch-hitter. Continuing to decrease his playing role, due to his injury, he was 1-for-14 (.071) in 1968–1969. He appeared in just six games, and was released by Magallanes at the end of the season.

==== Leones del Caracas/Tiburones de La Guaira ====
García joined the Leones del Caracas in the 1969–1970 season, batting .242 (8-for-33) with one RBI and a run scored in 22 games. He then finished his career in 1970–1971, after going hitless in six at bats in six games for the Tiburones de La Guaira.

== Batting statistics ==
Some statistics are incomplete because there are no records available at the time of the request. Nevertheless, Camaleón García collected more than 3,100 hits along the way in the many baseball circuits he played, not including VPBL postseason games and Caribbean Series appearances.

=== Regular season ===
Years	League	GP	AB	R	H	2B	3B	HR	RBI	SB	TB	BB	SO	BA	OBP	SLG	OPS	Ref
1949	MiLB (D)	109	381		92	12	4	1			115			.241		.302		
1949–1971	VPBL	965	3564	455	1065	183	21	63	533	32	1479			.299		.415		
1950–1952	MiLB (C)	248	900		250	28	12	16			350			.278		.389		
1953	MiLB (B)	81	316		96	19	1	10	13	2	147			.304		.407		
1953–1955	MiLB (AAA)	352	1147	137	274	44	1	19	123	7	377	136	133	.239	.326	.329	.654	
1956–1965	MXL (AA)	1124	4181	660	1346	229	14	171	759	27	2116			.322		.507		
1959–1960	ZUL	15	61	7	15	3	0	2	6	3	27			.246		.443		
1966	MXSE (A)													.319				

=== Postseason ===
Years	League	GP	AB	R	H	2B	3B	HR	RBI	SB	TB	BB	SO	BA	OBP	SLG	OPS	Ref
1958–1966	VPBL (six times)	42	156	12	39	6	0	1	15	0	48			.250		.308		
1950–1960	Caribbean Series (eight times)	46	155	23	43	12	0	4	28	3	67			.277		.432		

== Later years ==
Following his retirement, García enjoyed spending time with his family and eventually going to the ballparks, where he shared countless anecdotes with broadcasters, journalists, and baseball people. He also collaborated with the Criollitos de Venezuela, a local little league corporation that operates not only as a baseball academy but as a means of integral formation of children and adolescents through sport.

Three times, he has been considered on the Veterans Committee of the Mexican Professional Baseball Hall of Fame. García was on the ballot in 2005, 2007 and 2009, always garnering enough votes to remain on the ballot, but never coming close to election.

His first public recognition came in 2000, when he received the honor of induction into the Caribbean Baseball Hall of Fame for his notable contribution in the Caribbean Series.

In 2003, he was honored by the Venezuelan Baseball Hall of Fame and Museum as part of their first class.

After that he was inducted into the Latino Baseball Hall of Fame through the Veterans Committee in 2011. In addition, a baseball park in the City of Caracas is named after him.

Then, in 2012 he became an inaugural inductee into the Navegantes del Magallanes Hall of Fame; while his uniform number 21 was retired by the franchise.

Besides this, in 2012 García and fellow and countryman Luis Aparicio were honored prior to a Caracas–Magallanes game at Estadio José Bernardo Pérez. After the ceremony, both Venezuela legends threw out the ceremonial first ball.

García died in Caracas, Venezuela in 2014, at the age of 84, after suffering a cerebrovascular disease.
