= 1959 Caribbean Series =

1959 baseball tournament

Tournament details
- Country: Venezuela
- City: Caracas
- Venue(s): 1 (in 1 host city)
- Dates: 10–15 February
- Teams: 4

Final positions
- Champions: (Cuba) Alacranes del Almendares (2nd title)
- Runners-up: (Venezuela) Indios de Oriente

Awards
- MVP: (United States) Norm Cash

The eleventh edition of the Caribbean Series (Serie del Caribe) was played in 1959. It was held from February 10 through February 15 with the champions teams from Cuba (Almendares), Panama (Coclé), Puerto Rico (Santurce) and Venezuela (Oriente). The format consisted of 12 games, each team facing the other teams twice. The games were played at UCV Stadium in Caracas, Venezuela, which boosted capacity to 35.000 seats, and the first pitch was thrown by Edgar Sanabria, by then the President of Venezuela.

== Summary ==
Cuba won the Series with a 5-1 record for a fourth straight championship. The Almendares club won for the second time guided by manager Sungo Carrera and led by 1B Rocky Nelson (.320 BA, six RBI), LF Carlos Paula (.462), 2B Tony Taylor (.346, .462 SLG) and RF Sandy Amorós (.333). The pitching staff included starters Camilo Pascual (2-0, 16 strikeouts, 1.50 ERA, 18 innings), Orlando Peña (1-1, 17 2/3 innings) Art Fowler (1-0, 1.00, nine innings) and reliever Mike Cuellar (1-0, 0.00). Other players for Cuba included pitchers Tommy Lasorda, Cholly Naranjo and Carlos Pascual in addition to Bob Allison (OF), Jim Baxes (3B), Dick Brown (C), Miguel de la Hoz (2B), Enrique Izquierdo (C), Willy Miranda (SS), Leonardo Posada (OF) and Angel Scull (OF).

Venezuela, with a low-profile team, finished an honourable second place after going 4-2. Managed by Kerby Farrell, the offense was anchored by RF/1B and Series MVP Norman Cash, who finished with a .360 BA (9-for-25), 11 RBI and a .680 SLG. Oriente also received a considerable support from 3B Luis García and LF Jesús Mora, who tied for first place in the batting race with a .417 average (10-for-24). García added six runs, three doubles and slugged .625, while Mora collected four runs and a .583 SLG. Werner Birrer was the top pitcher with a 2-0 record, including a 13-inning victory, a 1.25 ERA and 18 SO in 21 2/3 innings. He also set a Series record with 13 innings pitched in a single game (#2), while Cash set a new mark with six RBI in a single game (#8). Other players included Elio Chacón (SS), Jim Owens (P), Ramón Monzant (P) and Jerry Snyder (2B).

Puerto Rico, managed by Ramón Concepción, disappointed with a 3-3 mark to finish in third place. C Valmy Thomas (.381) and 1B Orlando Cepeda (.333) led the attack, while Marion Fricano and Julio Navarro each pitched 1–0 shutouts. Santurce also featured Luis Arroyo (P), Joe Black (P), Jackie Brandt (CF), Orlando Cepeda (1B), Nino Escalera (1B/OF), Rubén Gómez (P), Willie Kirkland (RF), Bob Lennon (LF), Félix Maldonado (LF), Lloyd Merritt (P), José Pagán (3B), Victor Pellot Power (2B), José Santiago (P) and Pete Wojey (P).

Panama finished in last place with a 0-6 record, to become the first winless team in Series history. The Coclé club was managed by Les Peden and benefited from a solid effort by RF Ken Hunt, who hit .304 with five RBI, home run, triple and a .609 SLG. Other players included P Bud Black, IF Owen Friend, SS Pumpsie Green, OF Gail Henley and IF/OF Joe Tuminelli, among others.

== Participating teams ==
Team	Manager
(Cuba) Alacranes del Almendares	(Cuba) Clemente Carreras
(Panama) Azucareros de Coclé	(United States) Les Peden
(Puerto Rico) Cangrejeros de Santurce	(Puerto Rico) Monchile Concepción
(Venezuela) Indios de Oriente	(United States) Kerby Farrell

== Final standings ==
Pos	Team	Pld	W	L	RF	RA	RD	PCT	GB
1	(Cuba) Alacranes del Almendares	6	5	1	30	8	+22	.833	—
2	(Venezuela) Indios de Oriente (H)	6	4	2	31	34	−3	.667	1
3	(Puerto Rico) Cangrejeros de Santurce	6	3	3	20	16	+4	.500	2
4	(Panama) Azucareros de Coclé	6	0	6	13	36	−23	.000	5

Source: CBPC
(H) Hosts

== Scoreboards ==
=== Game 1, February 10 ===
Team	1	2	3	4	5	6	7	8	9	R	H	E
Cuba	0	0	0	0	1	0	0	0	0	1	7	0
Puerto Rico	0	0	0	0	0	0	0	0	2	2	5	0
WP: Rubén Gómez (1-0) LP: Orlando Peña (0-1)

=== Game 2, February 10 ===
Team	1	2	3	4	5	6	7	8	9	10	11	12	13	R	H	E
Panama	0	0	0	0	0	0	0	0	2	0	0	0	0	2	7	2
Venezuela	0	0	1	0	0	1	0	0	0	0	0	0	1	3	14	1
WP: Werner Birrer (1-0) LP: Stanley Arthur Wall (0-1)

=== Game 3, February 11 ===
Team	1	2	3	4	5	6	7	8	9	R	H	E
Cuba	1	0	0	0	0	3	0	0	0	4	11	1
Panama	0	1	0	0	0	0	0	0	0	1	6	2
WP: Camilo Pascual (1-0) LP: Bud Black (0-1)

=== Game 4, February 11 ===
Team	1	2	3	4	5	6	7	8	9	R	H	E
Puerto Rico	0	2	0	0	0	2	0	0	1	5	13	1
Venezuela	0	1	0	0	0	0	1	0	4	6	10	1
WP: Marcelino Sánchez (1-0) LP: Pete Wojey (0-1); Home runs: PRI: Orlando Cepeda (1); VEN: Norman Cash 2 (2)

=== Game 5, February 12 ===
Team	1	2	3	4	5	6	7	8	9	R	H	E
Puerto Rico	3	0	2	1	0	0	3	0	0	9	16	3
Panama	0	0	0	3	0	0	0	0	0	3	5	2
WP: Marion Fricano (1-0) LP: Alberto Osorio (0-1)

=== Game 6, February 12 ===
Team	1	2	3	4	5	6	7	8	9	R	H	E
Cuba	0	0	0	0	0	4	0	4	3	11	12	2
Venezuela	0	0	1	0	0	0	0	0	0	1	2	2
WP: Art Fowler (1-0) LP: Ramón Monzant (0-1); Home runs: CUB: Tony Taylor (1); VEN: None

=== Game 7, February 13 ===
Team	1	2	3	4	5	6	7	8	9	R	H	E
Puerto Rico	0	0	0	0	0	0	0	0	0	0	7	1
Cuba	1	0	0	0	0	0	0	0	X	1	7	1
WP: Orlando Peña (1-0) LP: Lloyd Merritt (0-1)

=== Game 8, February 13 ===
Team	1	2	3	4	5	6	7	8	9	R	H	E
Venezuela	4	1	0	0	6	0	2	0	1	14	22	2
Panama	0	1	3	0	0	0	0	0	1	5	13	1
WP: Dave Hoskins (1-0) LP: Richard Donnelly (0-1); Home runs: VEN: None; PAN: Ken Hunt (1)

=== Game 9, February 14 ===
Team	1	2	3	4	5	6	7	8	9	R	H	E
Panama	0	0	0	2	0	0	0	0	0	2	8	0
Cuba	1	0	0	1	0	1	0	2	X	5	8	0
WP: Mike Cuellar (1-0) LP: Pete Meza (0-1)

=== Game 10, February 14 ===
Team	1	2	3	4	5	6	7	8	9	R	H	E
Venezuela	1	1	0	0	0	0	3	0	0	5	10	1
Puerto Rico	1	0	0	0	0	0	0	0	2	3	7	2
WP: Werner Birrer (2-0) LP: Rubén Gómez (1-1)

=== Game 11, February 15 ===
Team	1	2	3	4	5	6	7	8	9	R	H	E
Venezuela	0	0	0	0	0	0	0	2	0	2	3	3
Cuba	2	0	0	0	0	2	3	1	X	8	10	1
WP: Camilo Pascual (2-0) LP: Jim Owens (0-1); Notes: It was the fourth win by Pascual in his Series career, surpassing the previous record of three wins set by Agapito Mayor in 1949.

=== Game 12, February 15 ===
Team	1	2	3	4	5	6	7	8	9	R	H	E
Panama	0	0	0	0	0	0	0	0	0	0	7	0
Puerto Rico	0	0	0	0	0	1	0	0	X	1	4	1
WP: Julio Navarro (1-0) LP: Bud Black (0-2)

== Statistics leaders ==
Statistic	Player	Team	Total
Batting average	(Venezuela) Luis García	(Venezuela) Indios de Oriente	.417
Batting average	(Venezuela) Jesús Mora	(Venezuela) Indios de Oriente	.417
Home runs	(United States) Norm Cash	(Venezuela) Indios de Oriente	2
Runs batted in	(United States) Norm Cash	(Venezuela) Indios de Oriente	11
Runs	(Venezuela) Luis García	(Venezuela) Indios de Oriente	6
Hits	(Venezuela) Luis García	(Venezuela) Indios de Oriente	10
Hits	(Venezuela) Jesús Mora	(Venezuela) Indios de Oriente	10
Doubles	(Venezuela) Luis García	(Venezuela) Indios de Oriente	3
Triples	Seven tied		1
Stolen bases	(Cuba) Tony Taylor	(Cuba) Alacranes del Almendares	3
Wins	(United States) Babe Birrer	(Venezuela) Indios de Oriente	2
Wins	(Cuba) Camilo Pascual	(Cuba) Alacranes del Almendares	2
Earned run average	(United States) Babe Birrer	(Venezuela) Indios de Oriente	1.25
Strikeouts	(United States) Babe Birrer	(Venezuela) Indios de Oriente	18
Saves	(Venezuela) Ramón Monzant	(Venezuela) Indios de Oriente	1
Innings pitched	(United States) Babe Birrer	(Venezuela) Indios de Oriente	21 2/3

== Awards ==
Tournament Awards
Award	Player	Team
MVP	(United States) Norm Cash	(Venezuela) Indios de Oriente
Best manager	(Cuba) Clemente Carreras	(Cuba) Alacranes del Almendares

All Star Team
Position	Player	Team
First base	(United States) Rocky Nelson	(Cuba) Alacranes del Almendares
Second base	(Cuba) Tony Taylor	(Cuba) Alacranes del Almendares
Third base	(Venezuela) Luis García	(Venezuela) Indios de Oriente
Shortstop	(Cuba) Willy Miranda	(Cuba) Alacranes del Almendares
Left field	(Venezuela) Jesús Mora	(Venezuela) Indios de Oriente
Center field	(United States) Jackie Brandt	(Puerto Rico) Cangrejeros de Santurce
Right field	(United States) Norm Cash	(Venezuela) Indios de Oriente
Catcher	(Puerto Rico) Valmy Thomas	(Puerto Rico) Cangrejeros de Santurce
Pitcher	(United States) Babe Birrer	(Venezuela) Indios de Oriente

== See also ==
- Ballplayers who have played in the Series

== Sources ==
- Antero Núñez, José. Series del Caribe. Jefferson, Caracas, Venezuela: Impresos Urbina, C.A., 1987.
- Gutiérrez, Daniel. Enciclopedia del Béisbol en Venezuela – 1895-2006 . Caracas, Venezuela: Impresión Arte, C.A., 2007.
