= Indios de Oriente =

Venezuelan baseball club active from 1956-1964

The Indios de Oriente was a baseball club which played from 1956 through 1964 in the Venezuelan Professional Baseball League. They played its home games at the Estadio Municipal de Puerto La Cruz in Anzoátegui, Venezuela.

== History ==
The Indios de Oriente replaced the Navegantes del Magallanes franchise for the 1956–1957 season. The team finished second in the first half with a 13-14 record, but slumped to 10-15 in the second half to finish last in the four-team league, out of contention. They improved to a 22-19 mark in 1957–1958, good for a second place and a playoff berth, but failed in the opening round.

In 1958–1959 Oriente finished second during the regular season. Then advanced to the playoffs and clinched the Championship title. As the league champions, the team represented Venezuela in the 1959 Caribbean Series played in Caracas.

With a low-profile squad, Oriente came in on an honourable second place behind Cuba's Alacranes de Almendares after finishing 4-2. Managed by Kerby Farrell, the offensive was anchored by RF/1B and Series MVP Norman Cash, who collected a .360 average and 11 RBI, while slugging .680. Babe Birrer was the top pitcher with a 2-0 record, including a 13-inning victory, a 1.25 ERA and 18 strikeouts in 21 2/3 innings of work. Besides, 3B Luis ′′Camaleón′′ García and OF Jesús Mora tied for the batting title with a .417 average. All of them made the All-Star team.

The 1959–1960 VPBL season was suspended because of a players' strike. Returning to action the next season, the team finished second with a 29-23 record but lost the semifinal round to the eventual champion team, the Industriales de Valencia.

In 1961–1962, for the fourth time in team's history, the Indios ended in second place during the regular season after going 29-22. Lastly, Oriente was beaten by the Leones del Caracas in the best-of-seven championship series, four to one games.

The Indios de Oriente declined considerably in 1962–1963, posting an 8-25 record before retiring during the midseason.

== Estrellas de Oriente ==
The franchise was renamed and restructured to become the Estrellas de Oriente for the 1963-64 season. They also were misspelled as the Estrellas Orientales or simply Oriente. Nonetheless, the changes did not create a more competitive team, as they finished fourth with a 21-29 record. At the end of the year, the franchise owners acquired the brand Navegantes del Magallanes and continued in the league the following season.

== Yearly team records ==
Season	Record	Finish	Manager	Notes
1956-57	13-14 (1st half); 10-15 (2nd half)	2nd 4th	Lázaro Salazar	
1957-58	22-19	2nd	Daniel Canónico	Lost 1st round series
1958-59	22-19	2nd	Kerby Farrell	Won 1st and 2nd playoff rounds Championship title
1959-60	14-14	--	Alberto Hidalgo	Season suspended by players' strike
1960-61	29-23	2nd	Alberto Hidalgo; Ramón Monzant	Lost semifinal round
1961-62	29-22	2nd	Daniel Canónico	Lost championship series
1962-63	8-25	4th	Chico Carrasquel	Folded before the end of the season
1963-64	21-29	4th	George Genovese	

== Noted players ==
- Joe Altobelli (ORI)
- Steve Bailey (EOR)
- Babe Birrer (ORI)
- Oswaldo Blanco (ORI)
- Carl Boles (EOR)
- José Bracho (ORI/EOR)
- Chico Carrasquel (ORI/EOR)
- Néstor Chávez (EOR)
- Harry Chiti (ORI)
- Jimmie Coker (ORI)
- Joe Collins (ORI)
- Ray Crone (ORI)
- Tony Curry (ORI)
- Bob Darnell (ORI)
- Bob Duliba (ORI)
- Doc Edwards (ORI)
- Dick Egan (ORI)
- Harry Elliott (ORI)
- Dick Fowler (ORI)
- Jim Frey (ORI)
- Luis García (ORI/EOR)
- Bob Gibson (ORI)
- Rod Graber (ORI)
- Eli Grba (EOR)
- Bert Hamric (ORI)
- Jack Hiatt (EOR)
- Aaron Pointer (EOR)
- Julián Ladera (ORI)
- Johnny Lewis (ORI)
- Jack Lohrke (ORI)
- Joe Lonnett (ORI)
- Hank Mason (ORI)
- Ramón Monzant (ORI)
- Jesús Mora (ORI)
- Manny Mota (ORI)
- Mel Nelson (EOR)
- Chi-Chi Olivo (ORI)
- Jim Owens (ORI)
- Aaron Pointer (EOR)
- Dusty Rhodes (ORI)
- Don Rudolph (ORI)
- Johnny Schaive (ORI)
- Wally Shannon (ORI)
- Dick Simpson (EOR)
- Dean Stone (ORI)
- Jerry Snyder (ORI)
- Ron Taylor (ORI)
- Fred Valentine (ORI)
- Gale Wade (ORI)
- Ray Webster (ORI)
- Mike White (ORI)

== Sources ==
- Gutiérrez, Daniel; González, Javier (1992). Numeritos del béisbol profesional venezolano (1946-1992). LVBP, Caracas. ISBN 980-0712-47-X
- Nuñez, José Antero (1994). Serie del Caribe de la Habana a Puerto La Cruz. JAN Editor. ISBN 980-07-2389-7
