= 1954 Caribbean Series =

Sixth edition of The Caribbean Series

Tournament details
- Country: Puerto Rico
- City: San Juan
- Venue(s): 1 (in 1 host city)
- Dates: 18–23 February
- Teams: 4

Final positions
- Champions: (Puerto Rico) Criollos de Caguas (1st title)
- Runners-up: (Cuba) Alacranes del Almendares

Awards
- MVP: (United States) Jim Rivera

The sixth edition of the Caribbean Series (Serie del Caribe) was played in 1954. It was held from February 18 through February 23, featuring the champion baseball teams from Cuba (Alacranes del Almendares), Panama (Carta Vieja Yankees), Puerto Rico, (Criollos de Caguas) and Venezuela (Lácteos de Pastora). Lácteos de Pastora were the champion of the Liga Occidental de Béisbol Profesional rather than the Venezuelan Professional Baseball League. The format consisted of 12 games, each team facing the other teams twice. The games were played at Estadio Sixto Escobar in San Juan, P.R.

== Summary ==
Puerto Rico won the Series with a 4-2 record en route for a second straight championship (third overall). The Caguas club was managed by Mickey Owen and led by center fielder and Series MVP Jim Rivera, who posted a .400 batting average to lead the hitters. Caguas also received offensive support from 1B Víctor Pellot Power (.348) and 2B Jack Cassini (.333). Meanwhile, the pitching staff surrendered only 10 earned runs (2.00 ERA), being led by starters Corky Valentine (1-0, 1.00 ERA, five hits), Brooks Lawrence (1-0, 1.00, six hits) and Rubén Gómez (1-0, 2.00, five hits), while reliever Luis Arroyo added depth coming out of the bullpen (three appearances, 1-0, 0.00, 7 1/3 innings). Puerto Rico also had Jack Sanford (P) in addition to Félix Mantilla (SS), Charlie Neal (IF) and Luis (Canena) Márquez.

Cuba, piloted by Bobby Bragan, had a 3-3 record to tie the second place with Panama. The Cuban squad got fine work of P Conrado Marrero (1-0, five-hit shutout), CF Sam Chapman (.391, homerun, .609 SLG) and RF Angel Scull (.391, .522 SLG). Other roster members included Julio Bécquer (1B), Joe Hatten (P), Cholly Naranjo (P) and Héctor Rodríguez (3B).

Panama was managed by Al Kubski and received a heroic pitching effort by starter Victor Stryska (2-0), who allowed just one earned run in 18 innings pitched. The attack was guided by 3B Joe Tuminelli (.391) and LF Bobby Prescott (.381), in an anemic lineup who batted a collective .255 average and scored 17 runs (fewest in the Series).

Venezuela was guided by Napoleón Reyes and finished in last place with a 2-4 record. Ramón Monzant (1-0, 3.00) and Ralph Beard (1-0, 7.20) got the victories, while Howie Fox collected a 2.58 ERA in two appearances but lose a decision. Bad luck starter Thornton Kipper dropped two decisions, losing his duels against Gómez (PR) and Stryska (PAN), while allowing four earned runs (2.12) in 17 innings. Besides, Emilio Cueche made two strong relief appearances and allowed just one earned run in 8 2/3 innings of work. 3B Luis García provided the lone offensive threat with a .348 BA and a .563 SLG, including nine RBI to lead the Series hitters. Venezuela included Ed Bailey (C), Vernon Benson (SS), Tommy Byrne (P/1B), Wally Moon (CF), Johnny Temple and rookie Luis Aparicio (SS), among others.

== Participating teams ==
Team	Manager
(Cuba) Alacranes del Almendares	(United States) Bobby Bragan
(Panama) Carta Vieja Yankees	(United States) Al Kubski
(Puerto Rico) Criollos de Caguas	(United States) Mickey Owen
(Venezuela) Lácteos de Pastora	(Cuba) Napoleón Reyes

== Final standings ==
Pos	Team	Pld	W	L	RF	RA	RD	PCT	GB
1	(Puerto Rico) Criollos de Caguas (H)	6	4	2	22	15	+7	.667	—
2	(Cuba) Alacranes del Almendares	6	3	3	28	18	+10	.500	1
3	(Panama) Carta Vieja Yankees	6	3	3	17	31	−14	.500	1
4	(Venezuela) Lácteos de Pastora	6	2	4	21	24	−3	.333	2

Source: CBPC
(H) Hosts

== Scoreboards ==
=== Game 1, February 18 ===
Team	1	2	3	4	5	6	7	8	R	H	E
Venezuela	0	0	0	1	0	0	0	6	7	10	3
Cuba	2	1	1	1	0	0	0	0	5	10	1
WP: Ralph Beard (1-0) LP: Junior Walsh (0-1) Sv: Howie Fox (1); Home runs: : None; CUB: Joe Hatten (1) * Game was called after eight innings due to time limit.

=== Game 2, February 18 ===
Team	1	2	3	4	5	6	7	8	9	R	H	E
Panama	0	0	0	0	0	1	3	0	0	4	7	1
Puerto Rico	0	0	1	0	0	0	0	0	0	1	8	1
WP: Victor Stryska (1-0) LP: Jack Sanford (0-1)

=== Game 3, February 19 ===
Team	1	2	3	4	5	6	7	8	9	R	H	E
Cuba	0	2	2	2	0	0	4	0	3	13	16	1
Panama	0	0	0	0	0	0	0	0	0	0	5	2
WP: Conrado Marrero (1-0) LP: Humberto Robinson (0-1); Home runs: CUB: Ray Orteig 2 (2); PAN: None

=== Game 4, February 19 ===
Team	1	2	3	4	5	6	7	8	9	R	H	E
Puerto Rico	0	0	0	0	0	2	0	1	0	3	7	0
Venezuela	0	0	0	2	0	0	0	0	0	2	5	3
WP: Rubén Gómez (1-0) LP: Thornton Kipper (0-1); Home runs: PUR: None; VEN: Luis García (1) * Future Hall of Famer SS Luis Aparicio debuted in the Series.

=== Game 5, February 20 ===
Team	1	2	3	4	5	6	7	8	9	R	H	E
Panama	0	0	0	0	2	0	0	0	1	3	6	5
Venezuela	5	3	0	0	1	0	0	0	X	9	7	1
WP: Ramón Monzant (1-0) LP: Cookie Stemple (0-1); Home runs: PAN: None; VEN: Billy Queen (1)

=== Game 6, February 20 ===
Team	1	2	3	4	5	6	7	8	9	R	H	E
Puerto Rico	0	0	0	0	0	0	3	0	0	3	6	0
Cuba	0	1	0	0	0	0	0	0	0	1	6	0
WP: Brooks Lawrence (1-0) LP: Cliff Fannin (0-1); Home runs: PUR: Bill Howerton (1), Ranee Pless (1); CUB: Sam Chapman (1)

=== Game 7, February 21 ===
Team	1	2	3	4	5	6	7	8	R	H	E
Cuba	0	0	4	0	0	0	0	0	4	7	1
Venezuela	0	0	0	0	1	0	0	0	1	9	3
WP: Clarence Lott (1-0) LP: Howie Fox (0-1); Home runs: CUB: None; VEN: * Game was called after eight innings due to time limit.

=== Game 8, February 21 ===
Team	1	2	3	4	5	6	7	8	9	10	11	R	H	E
Puerto Rico	2	0	1	0	0	0	0	0	0	0	3	6	12	0
Panama	0	0	0	1	0	0	0	2	0	0	0	3	8	3
WP: Luis Arroyo (1-0) LP: Humberto Robinson (0-2); Home runs: PUR: None; PAN: Ray Dabek (1)

=== Game 9, February 22 ===
Team	1	2	3	4	5	6	7	8	9	R	H	E
Panama	0	0	0	2	0	3	0	0	0	5	7	0
Cuba	0	0	0	1	0	0	0	0	0	1	2	2
WP: Bill Hockenbury (1-0) LP: Bob Muncrief (0-1)

=== Game 10, February 22 ===
Team	1	2	3	4	5	6	7	8	9	R	H	E
Venezuela	1	0	0	0	0	0	0	0	0	1	5	2
Puerto Rico	2	3	0	0	2	0	0	0	X	7	8	0
WP: Corky Valentine (1-0) LP: Ralph Beard (1-1)

=== Game 11, February 23 ===
Team	1	2	3	4	5	6	7	8	9	R	H	E
Venezuela	0	0	0	0	1	0	0	0	0	1	1	1
Panama	0	0	0	0	1	0	0	0	1	2	10	2
WP: Victor Stryska (2-0) LP: Thornton Kipper (0-2)

=== Game 12, February 23 ===
Team	1	2	3	4	5	6	7	8	9	R	H	E
Cuba	4	0	0	0	0	0	0	0	0	4	7	1
Puerto Rico	0	0	1	0	1	0	0	0	0	2	6	4
WP: Junior Walsh (1-1) LP: Chi-Chi Olivo (0-1)

== Statistics leaders ==
Statistic	Player	Team	Total
Batting average	(United States) Jim Rivera	(Puerto Rico) Criollos de Caguas	.450
Home runs	(United States) Ray Orteig	(Cuba) Alacranes del Almendares	2
Runs batted in	(Venezuela) Luis García	(Venezuela) Lácteos de Pastora	9
Runs	(Cuba) Angel Scull	(Cuba) Alacranes del Almendares	5
Hits	(United States) Jim Rivera	(Puerto Rico) Criollos de Caguas	9
Doubles	(Puerto Rico) Vic Power	(Puerto Rico) Criollos de Caguas	3
Doubles	(Panama) Bobby Prescott	(Panama) Carta Vieja Yankees	3
Triples	Five players tied		1
Stolen bases	(United States) Jack Cassini	(Puerto Rico) Criollos de Caguas	2
Wins	(United States) Vic Stryska	(Panama) Carta Vieja Yankees	2
Earned run average	(United States) Vic Stryska	(Panama) Carta Vieja Yankees	0.50
Strikeouts	(United States) Joe Hatten	(Cuba) Alacranes del Almendares	12
Saves	(United States) Howie Fox	(Venezuela) Lácteos de Pastora	1
Innings pitched	(United States) Vic Stryska	(Panama) Carta Vieja Yankees	18.0

== Awards ==
Tournament Awards
Award	Player	Team
MVP	(United States) Jim Rivera	(Puerto Rico) Criollos de Caguas
Best manager	(United States) Mickey Owen	(Puerto Rico) Criollos de Caguas

All Star Team
Position	Player	Team
First base	(Puerto Rico) Vic Power	(Puerto Rico) Criollos de Caguas
Second base	(United States) Jack Cassini	(Puerto Rico) Criollos de Caguas
Third base	(Venezuela) Luis García	(Venezuela) Lácteos de Pastora
Shortstop	(United States) Vern Benson	(Venezuela) Lácteos de Pastora
Left field	(Panama) Bobby Prescott	(Panama) Carta Vieja Yankees
Center field	(United States) Jim Rivera	(Puerto Rico) Criollos de Caguas
Right field	(United States) Sam Chapman	(Cuba) Alacranes del Almendares
Catcher	(United States) Ray Orteig	(Cuba) Alacranes del Almendares
Pitcher	(United States) Vic Stryska	(Panama) Carta Vieja Yankees

== See also ==
- Ballplayers who have played in the Series

== Sources ==
- Antero Núñez, José. Series del Caribe. Jefferson, Caracas, Venezuela: Impresos Urbina, C.A., 1987.
- Gutiérrez, Daniel. Enciclopedia del Béisbol en Venezuela – 1895-2006 . Caracas, Venezuela: Impresión Arte, C.A., 2007.
