= Jesús Mora (baseball) =

Venezuelan baseball player (born 1933)

- Infielder / Outfielder
- Born: June 9, 1933 (age 93); Maracaibo, Zulia, Venezuela
- Bats: Right Throws: Right

Teams
- Venezuela League: Santa Marta BBC (1954–1955); Industriales de Valencia (1955–1956, 1956–1957, 1957–1958); Leones del Caracas (1957–1958); Indios de Oriente (1958–1959; 1960–1961, 1961–1962); Licoreros de Pampero (1959–1960); Tiburones de La Guaira (1962–1963); International League: Havana Sugar Kings (1957); South Atlantic League: Charlotte Hornets (1959); Mexico League: Diablos Rojos del México (1960)

Career highlights and awards
- 1959 Caribbean Series: Tied for the batting title; All-Star team

Jesús Mora (born June 9, 1933) is a Venezuelan former professional baseball player. He batted and threw right handed. Mora spent ten years in baseball, while playing from 1954 to 1963 for several teams in the Minor Leagues, Mexican Baseball and the Venezuela League. Although he never appeared in a Major League game, Mora teamed with major league figures and earned their respect by doing what he needed to do to win a game.

A versatile utility man, Mora was able to play all infield positions and in the outfield corners, but he did not hit well. The 5'7" 157-pound ballplayer posted a career .229 average in four different leagues. Further, while he played 235 games and collected 157 hits and 32 RBI in 687 at bats, he never hit a home run. As a result, he was used mostly by his slick glove and great instincts of the game, especially in the late innings, yet he would achieve notoriety in the final years of his career.

== Early life ==
Born in Maracaibo, Zulia; Mora was scouted while playing sandlot ball in his homeland. By the time he also played for a local semi-pro team, being respected in the league as a steady player whom managers could use in almost any position, and for being enthusiastic, positive, and hard working player. He then signed a contract to play in the Venezuelan Professional Baseball League during the 1954–1955 season.

== Professional career ==
=== 1954–1957 ===
Mora was assigned to the Santa Marta BBC, a lousy team managed by former big leaguer Red Kress, which had entered the league as a replacement for the departed Sabios de Vargas. Mora appeared in 21 of the 51 games of the team, batting .250 (5-for-20) with two doubles, two runs and three stolen bases, while playing as a backup infielder, and outfielder for Dave Pope and Joe Frazier. The franchise never reached a high level of popularity, failing to encourage a significant fan support, and would be replaced by the Industriales de Valencia in the 1955–1956 season.

After that Mora played three seasons for Valencia from 1955 to 1956 through 1957–1958. In between, he played briefly for the Leones del Caracas in the 1957–1958 tournament. Throughout this period, he hit .230 (29-for-126) with two triples and nine RBIs, while scoring 13 runs. He also played in 10 postseason games for the Industriales. In the 1957–1958 championship series, he scored a run as a pinch runner. Then, he hit .194 (6-for-32) with one double and two runs in the 1958–1959 first round.

During the same period Mora played for the Havana Sugar Kings of the International League in 1957. By then, the Sugar Kings were the Triple-A affiliate team of the Cincinnati Reds, and played their home games at Gran Stadium in Havana, Cuba. Several talented Latin players who eventually made it to the Major Leagues donned the Sugar Kings uniform, including the Venezuelan infielders Elio Chacón and Pompeyo Davalillo, whom Mora backed up at shortstop and third base, respectively. Mora appeared in 24 games, hitting .250 (12-for-48) with six doubles, six runs, 20 RBIs and two stolen bases.

=== Career highlight ===
Mora had his most productive season in the Venezuelan League while playing for the Indios de Oriente in 1957–1958. He batted a career-high .339 with four runs, four RBIs and three stolen bases, as the Indios won the pennant. As the league champions, the team represented Venezuela in the 1959 Caribbean Series played in Caracas. But Mora soon became an unexpected hero, when he hit .417 (10-for-24) in the Series, to tie teammate Camaleón García for the batting title. Mora also posted a .583 slugging average, batted two triples, drove in four runs, and scored four times. Even though the Venezuela's team finished second in the Series, Mora and García made the All-Star team, as did their fellows Babe Birrer and Norm Cash. This was the first time in Caribbean Series history in which four Venezuelan players made the All-Star team in the same year.

=== 1959–1963 ===
A few weeks after his Caribbean Series heroics, Mora joined the Charlotte Hornets of the South Atlantic League in 1959. The Hornets played as a Class-A team in the Washington Senators Minor league system. It was a brief stint for Mora, who collected two hits in 23 at-bats for a .087 average, appearing in just eight games. He then joined the Licoreros de Pampero during the VPBL 1959–1960 season, appearing for them in 27 games, while batting .226 (24-for-106) with four doubles, one triple, 12 runs and seven RBIs.

Mora also saw action with the Diablos Rojos del México of the Mexican League in 1960, but his statistics are incomplete because there are no records available. He returned to Oriente for two VPBL seasons from 1960 to 1962. He averaged .211 (43-for-204) in both seasons, including seven doubles, two triples, 30 runs, nine RBIs and three stolen bases in 72 games.

Mora played his last VPBL season for the 1962–1963 Tiburones de La Guaira. He contributed with his skills in glove work, batting and base running, hitting .220 (22-for-100) with two doubles, 11 runs, two RBIs and two steals in 36 games. This time he also served as fielding and running instructor for the team, nurturing and inspiring future big leaguers as Dámaso Blanco and Luis Salazar, among other rookies.

== Late life ==
After retiring at age 30, Mora continued using his baseball experience and life lessons to bring personal growth to young people.
