= Bagley, Wisconsin =

- Village
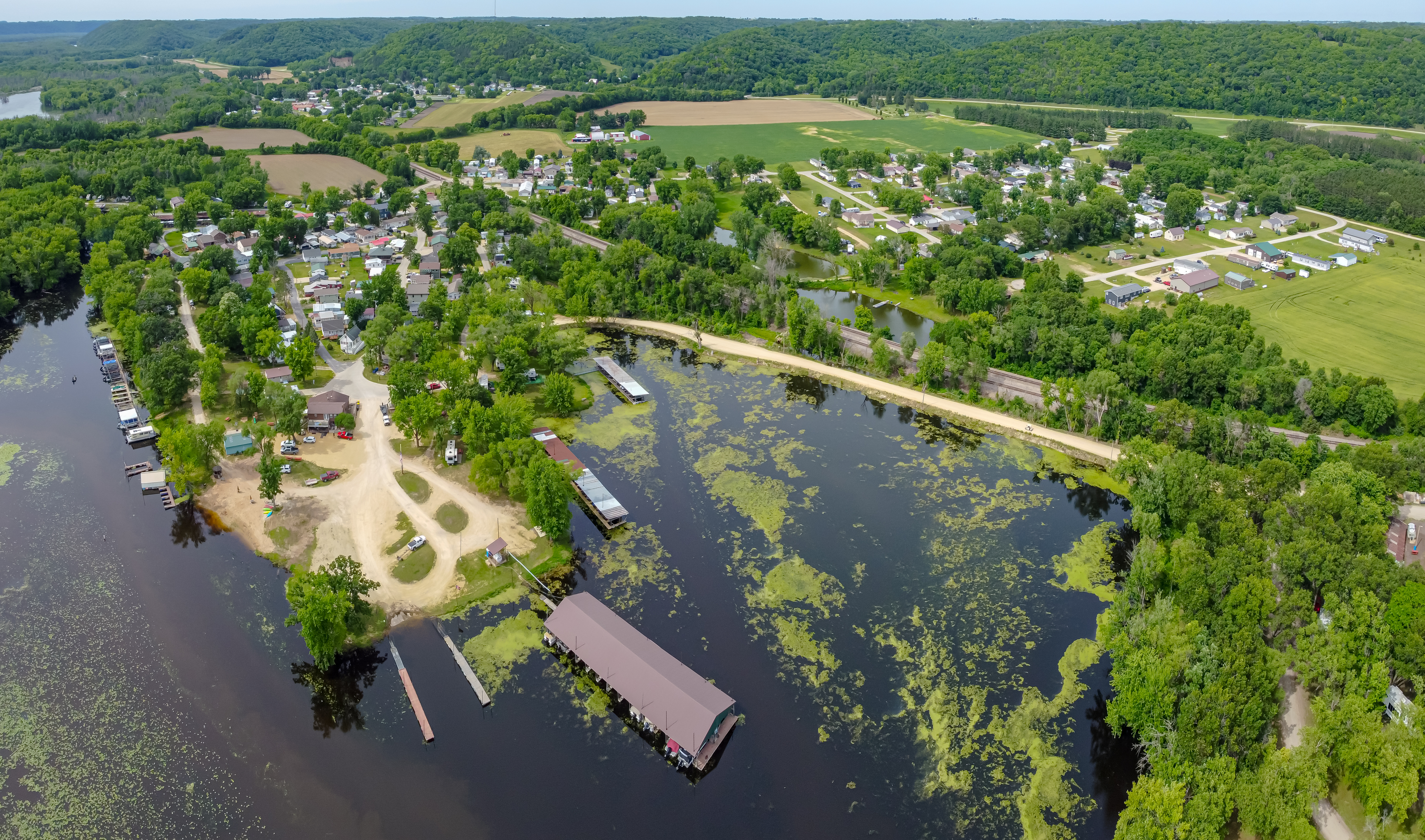
- BNSF Railway runs through town

- Location of Bagley in Grant County, Wisconsin.
- Coordinates: 42°54′10″N 91°6′3″W
- Country: United States
- State: Wisconsin
- County: Grant
- Established: 1919

Government
  - Type: Village

Area
  - Total: 0.74 sq mi (1.91 km^{2})
  - Land: 0.72 sq mi (1.86 km^{2})
  - Water: 0.019 sq mi (0.05 km^{2})
- Elevation: 640 ft (195 m)

Population (2020)
  - Total: 356
  - Density: 496/sq mi (191/km^{2})
- Time zone: UTC-6 (Central (CST))
  - Summer (DST): UTC-5 (CDT)
- Area code: 608
- FIPS code: 55-04250
- GNIS feature ID: 1561083
- Website: https://www.villageofbagley.com

There is also the Town of Bagley in Oconto County, Wisconsin.

Bagley is a village in Grant County in the U.S. state of Wisconsin, located on the Upper Mississippi River, approximately nine miles (15 km) south of Prairie du Chien. The population was 356 at the 2020 census. It is a popular riverside destination in the summer, when the population can quadruple. The village was named for Vermont natives Alfred and Mary Bagley, who owned the site.

== History ==
The land for the village originally belonged to Mary Bagley when in 1884 the Chicago, Burlington and Quincy Railroad built a depot. Later that year, the Saint Paul Land Company purchased the land and platted the village.

The village suffered damage on July 18, 2007, when a large thunderstorm dumped 7 inches (180 mm) of rain on the area. The storm was part of a "mesoscale convective systems", bringing thunderstorms with huge amounts of rain and lightning. What were normally minor streams, particularly Glass Hollow Creek, became raging torrents, pushing debris before them, backing up water into the town. No deaths or injuries were reported, but 50 people were evacuated from their homes by boat. Although nearly every home and business sustained damage, the town was not eligible for federal disaster aid.

== Geography ==
Bagley is located at 42°54′10″N 91°6′3″W (42.902764, -91.100714).

According to the United States Census Bureau, the village has a total area of 0.81 square miles (2.10 km^{2}), of which 0.77 square miles (1.99 km^{2}) is land and 0.04 square miles (0.10 km^{2}) is water.

== Demographics ==
Historical population
Census	Pop.	Note	%±
1920	315		—
1930	284		−9.8%
1940	293		3.2%
1950	329		12.3%
1960	275		−16.4%
1970	271		−1.5%
1980	317		17.0%
1990	306		−3.5%
2000	339		10.8%
2010	379		11.8%
2020	356		−6.1%
U.S. Decennial Census

=== 2010 census ===
As of the census of 2010, there were 379 people, 185 households, and 111 families living in the village. The population density was 492.2 inhabitants per square mile (190.0/km^{2}). There were 409 housing units at an average density of 531.2 per square mile (205.1/km^{2}). The racial makeup of the village was 97.9% White, 0.3% African American, 1.1% Native American, and 0.8% from two or more races. Hispanic or Latino of any race were 0.5% of the population.

There were 185 households, of which 18.9% had children under the age of 18 living with them, 43.8% were married couples living together, 10.3% had a female householder with no husband present, 5.9% had a male householder with no wife present, and 40.0% were non-families. 35.1% of all households were made up of individuals, and 22.2% had someone living alone who was 65 years of age or older. The average household size was 2.05 and the average family size was 2.59.

The median age in the village was 53.9 years. 17.2% of residents were under the age of 18; 5.7% were between the ages of 18 and 24; 15.5% were from 25 to 44; 32.8% were from 45 to 64; and 28.8% were 65 years of age or older. The gender makeup of the village was 52.5% male and 47.5% female.

=== 2000 census ===
As of the census of 2000, there were 339 people, 157 households, and 107 families living in the village. The population density was 451.7 people per square mile (174.5/km^{2}). There were 331 housing units at an average density of 441.1 per square mile (170.4/km^{2}). The racial makeup of the village was 96.76% White, 0.88% Native American, 0.29% Asian, 0.59% from other races, and 1.47% from two or more races. Hispanic or Latino of any race were 1.47% of the population.

There were 157 households, out of which 22.3% had children under the age of 18 living with them, 57.3% were married couples living together, 8.3% had a female householder with no husband present, and 31.8% were non-families. 28.7% of all households were made up of individuals, and 11.5% had someone living alone who was 65 years of age or older. The average household size was 2.16 and the average family size was 2.63.

In the village, the population was spread out, with 17.1% under the age of 18, 4.7% from 18 to 24, 21.5% from 25 to 44, 33.0% from 45 to 64, and 23.6% who were 65 years of age or older. The median age was 50 years. For every 100 females, there were 94.8 males. For every 100 females age 18 and over, there were 93.8 males.

The median income for a household in the village was $26,944, and the median income for a family was $38,906. Males had a median income of $27,841 versus $20,625 for females. The per capita income for the village was $15,685. About 8.9% of families and 11.1% of the population were below the poverty line, including 26.4% of those under age 18 and 2.7% of those age 65 or over.

== Notable people ==
- Thornton Kipper, baseball player, was born in Bagley and attended High School.
