= University Stadium (Caracas) =

Stadium in Caracas, Venezuela

Coordinates: 10°29′22.13″N 66°53′2.42″W

Estadio Universitario
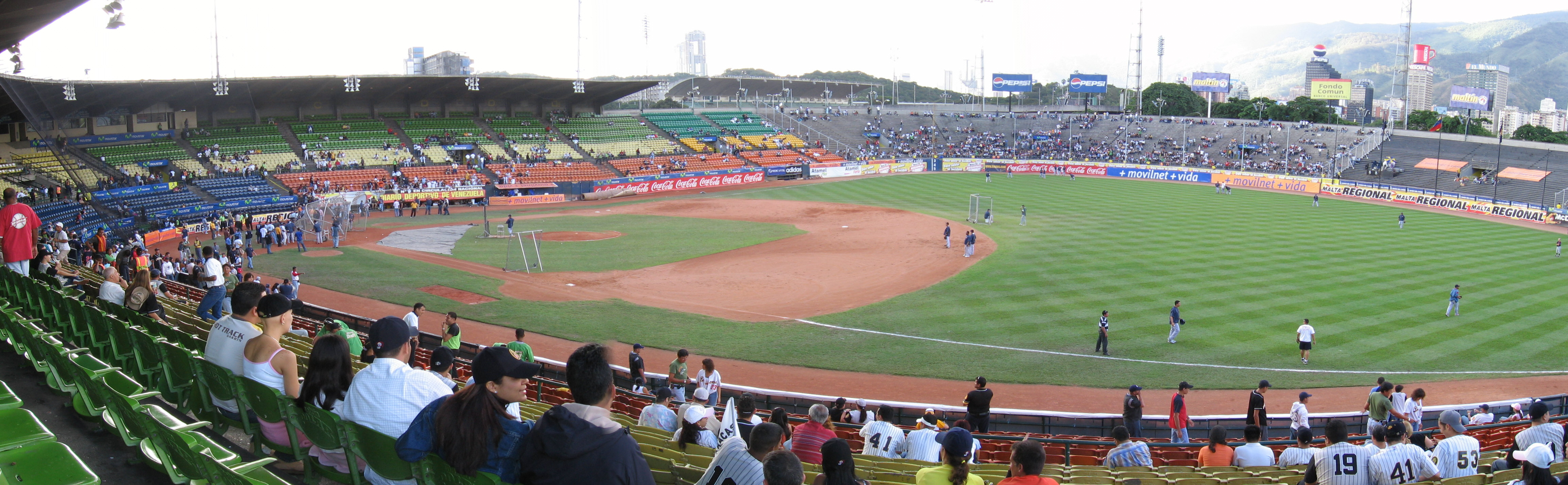
- Interactive map of Estadio Universitario
- Full name: Estadio Universitario de Caracas
- Location: Caracas, Venezuela
- Owner: Universidad Central de Venezuela
- Capacity: 20,900
- Field size: Left Field - 347 ft (105.8 m); Center Field - 385 ft (117.3 m); Right Field - 347 ft (105.8 m)

Construction
- Built: 1950 - 1951
- Opened: 1951

Tenants
- Leones del Caracas (1952–2023); Tiburones de la Guaira (1962–present); Senadores de Caracas (2021–present); Caciques de Distrito (2022–present)

The Estadio Universitario is a multi-use stadium in Caracas, Venezuela, and is used mostly for baseball games. The stadium holds 20,900 people and was built in 1952 for the first Latin American Series.

The Estadio Universitario served as the home stadium for the Venezuelan Professional Baseball League club Leones del Caracas until 2023 and the Tiburones de la Guaira as well until 2019, though they still use the stadium as a secondary home.

== Concerts ==
Country	Artist	Year
Mexico	Santana	1973
USA	Joan Baez	1976
USA	Christina Aguilera	2001
England	Oasis	2001
United Kingdom	Sting	2001
USA	Sheryl Crow	2001
Panamá	Rubén Blades	2001
USA	Collective Soul	2001
Puerto Rico	Ignacio Peña	2001
Mexico	Maná	2001
United Kingdom	Five	2001
Dominican Republic	Juan Luis Guerra	2002
Argentina	Ratones Paranoicos	2002
Panamá	Roberto Blades	2002
USA	Papa Roach	2002
USA	Korn	2002
Mexico	Paulina Rubio	2002
Canada	Alanis Morissette	2002
Chile	La Ley	2002
Ireland	Westlife	2002
United Kingdom	Roger Waters	2002
USA	Red Hot Chili Peppers	2002
USA	No Doubt	2002
Puerto Rico	Gilberto Santa Rosa	2003
Puerto Rico	Olga Tañón	2003
USA	Victor Manuelle	2004
Puerto Rico	Tego Calderón	2004
Mexico	Molotov	2004
Colombia	Andrea Echeverri	2004
Cuba	Jon Secada	2004
Spain	Julio Iglesias, Jr.	2004
Puerto Rico	Héctor & Tito	2004
Panamá	Rabanes	2004
USA	Bacilos	2004
Cuba	Rey Ruiz	2004
Puerto Rico	Jerry Rivera	2004
USA	Shalim Ortiz	2004
Puerto Rico	Luis Fonsi	2004
USA	Soraya	2004
Puerto Rico	Ricky Martin	1998/2005/2007
USA	Black Eyed Peas	2005
USA	Smash Mouth	2005
USA	Incubus	2005
Finland	The Rasmus	2005
USA	Hilary Duff	2005
Spain	La Oreja de Van Gogh	2005/2007
Mexico	RBD	2006
United Kingdom	Robbie Williams	2006
USA	Marc Anthony	2006
USA	High School Musical	2007
Mexico	Sin Bandera	2008
Spain	David Bisbal	2008
Argentina	Diego Torres	2008
Colombia	Fanny Lu	2008
USA	Aerosmith	2008
