= José St. Claire =

Dominican Republic baseball player known as "Pepe Lucas"

- Catcher / First baseman
- Born: February 20, 1913; Santo Domingo, Dominican Republic
- Died: September 20, 1993 (aged 80); Santo Domingo, Dominican Republic
- Batted: Right Threw: Right
Medals
Men's baseball
Representing Dominican Republic
Amateur World Series
Silver medal – second place	1942 Havana	Team
Bronze medal – third place	1943 Havana	Team
Latin American Series
Bronze medal – third place	1952 Caracas	Team

José Luis St. Claire Cábelo (February 20, 1913 — September 20, 1993), better known as Pepe Lucas, was a Dominican professional baseball player. In the Dominican Republic, he played for and managed the Leones del Escogido. He was also known for a home run during a 1951 championship game in the Puerto Rican League final, which became known across the Caribbean as the "Pepelucazo". That home run also became known as "the shot heard 'round the Caribbean".

== Career ==
Much of St. Claire's professional career was spent in the Mexican League, where he played with the Pericos de Puebla (1947), Azules de Veracruz (1947), Industriales de Monterrey (1948–50), Charros de Jalisco (1952), Diablos Rojos del México (1954), and Saraperos de Saltillo (1955–57).

On Saturday, February 17, 1951, St. Claire's team, the Cangrejeros de Santurce, were playing against the Criollos de Caguas y Guayama in Game Seven of the 1951 Puerto Rican league's final championship series. The Cangrejeros were vying for their first professional title, but the game was tied at two runs a side. With two outs in the bottom of the ninth inning, St. Claire came to bat. After a strike on the first pitch, he launched the second pitch of Caguas pitcher Mike Clark beyond the playing field for a homerun, giving Santurce the victory and winning the team their first championship. 16,700 people were present when St. Claire hit the homerun.

St. Claire played in the Colombian Professional Baseball League in 1950, serving as player-manager for the Tejedores de Flitta. He took the season's batting title, though Tejedores finished in last place.

At the 1951 Caribbean World Series, held in Caracas, Venezuela, St. Claire and the Cangrejeros won the Series championship.

== Hall of Fame ==
St. Claire, who also played in Cuba, Colombia, the Dominican Republic, Mexico and Venezuela professionally, was chosen as the best Dominican Republic first baseman of all time in 1972. Two years later, in 1974, he was inducted into the Dominican Republic's Sports Hall of Fame.
