= Armando Roche =

Cuban baseball player (1926-1997)

- Pitcher
- Born: December 7, 1926; Habana, Cuba
- Died: June 26, 1997 (aged 70); Maywood, Illinois, U.S.
- Batted: Right Threw: Right

MLB debut
- May 10, 1945, for the Washington Senators

Last MLB appearance
- June 5, 1945, for the Washington Senators

MLB statistics
- W-L record: 0-0
- Earned run average: 6.00
- Games pitched: 2
- Innings pitched: 6.0
- SO/BB: 0/2
- Stats at Baseball Reference

Teams
- Washington Senators (1945)
Medals
Men's baseball
Representing Cuba
Latin American Series
Gold medal – first place	1952 Caracas	Team

Armando Roche (December 7, 1926 – June 26, 1997) was a Cuban pitcher in Major League Baseball. He debuted as an 18 year old for the Washington Senators in its 1945 season.
