= Joe Tuminelli =

American baseball player

Joseph Louis Tuminelli (March 27, 1920 – April 30, 1980) was an American professional baseball third baseman in Minor League Baseball. Listed at 5 feet 9 inches (1.75 m) and 165 pounds (75 kg), he batted and threw right-handed.

== Biography ==
During nine seasons after World War II, Tuminelli enjoyed a solid baseball career while playing for ten teams in seven minor league circuits and three different countries. Although he never appeared in a Major League Baseball (MLB) game, he teamed up with several future big leaguers through the length of his career. A triple crown and Most Valuable Player winner, he also had productive seasons in Canadian baseball and the Panamanian Winter League.

Born in New York City, he was originally signed by the Brooklyn Dodgers. He debuted in 1946 with the Nashua Dodgers of the New England League, and was dealt to the Portland Gulls during the midseason. He finished with a combined batting average of .335 (10th of the league) and a .517 of slugging in 51 games. He opened with Portland in 1947, when the team was renamed the Pilots, and posted a batting line (BA/OBP/SLG) of .335/.378/.517 overall, while collecting a better OPS (.895) than league Most Valuable Player Roy Campanella (.870). Then, in 1947 he hit .309 for the Pilots.

In 1948 Tuminelli moved to the Drummondville Cubs of the Provincial League, a professional circuit based in Quebec. A struggling ballclub, the Cubs finished last in the five-team league with a 39-58 record, 21½ games out of first place. Notably, Tuminelli finished playing all 97 games for Drummondville, hitting a .302 average and 10 home runs, while leading the team in hits (117) and runs batted in (73).

Drummondville improved in 1949, after signing a group of core players that led the team to a championship. Among the newcomers were Danny Gardella, Max Lanier, Sal Maglie, Tex Shirley, Roberto Vargas, Roy Zimmerman and Víctor Pellot, who would later gain notoriety in the major leagues as Vic Power. Although Tuminelli continued to improve his numbers, batting .327 with eight home runs and 52 RBI, while leading the team once more in games (96), runs (73) and hits (125).

Tuminelli split 1950 with the Tampa Smokers and Fort Lauderdale Braves of the Florida International League, batting a combined .294/.358/.421 and 10 home runs. In addition, his .943 fielding average at third base was the best of any position player to play at least 100 games. He returned to FIL Fort Lauderdale in 1951 and ended the year with the St. Hyacinthe Saints of the Quebec Provincial League, hitting .263 and .286, respectively, while batting eight homers at both stops. He then found herself on the move again, this time with the Harrisburg Senators of the Interstate League, batting for them .241 in 85 games during the 1952 season.

His most productive season came in 1953, while playing in the Wisconsin State League for the Fond du Lac Panthers. Tuminelli won the Triple Crown honors that season, after batting a .390 average with 28 home runs and 148 RBI in 118 games appearances, leading the league also in runs (123), total bases (291) and slugging (.667), while ending second in OBP (.513) and posting a 3.63 walk-to-strikeout ratio (87-to-24).

He played his last season in 1954, appearing in just seven games for the Erie Senators of the Pennsylvania–Ontario–New York League (PONY League). Over his nine-season minor league career, he posted a batting average of .306 (809-for-2641) in 709 games played.

In between two tours in America and Canada, Tuminelli played in the Panamanian League during the winter. On the side, he also pitched and managed eventually.

He joined the Carta Vieja Yankees league's champions of the 1949–1950 season, then finished as the Most Valuable Player in the 1950 Caribbean Series, after leading the tournament with two home runs and seven RBI to give Panama its only title in Series history.

He also helped Carta Vieja clinch the 1951–1952 title, though he batted a low .208 average in the 1952 Caribbean Series. Then, he went 2-for-8 and stole two bases for the Panamanian club in the 1953 Series.

In the 1954 edition, Tuminelli batted .391 and scored four runs, while driving in three more and stealing a base, tying with Sam Chapman and Angel Scull of the Cuban team for the second-best average behind Puerto Rico's outfielder Jim Rivera (.450). He returned in the 1956 tournament as a replacement player, batting 2-for-3 with two runs and one RBI.

Tuminelli collected a batting average of .289 (24-for-83) in four Series appearances, which includes two doubles, two homers, nine runs, 11 RBI and five stolen bases.

As expected, Tuminelli was one of the most popular players in Panamanian baseball history. He made friends everywhere he went and remains beloved by fans even now. He was an honorary Panamanian, explained former major league first baseman Dave Roberts in his book A Baseball Odyssey.

Tuminelli married in 1951 with Acela Herrera and raised a family of children. He later was a long time resident of Miami, Florida, where he died in 1980 in at the age of 60.

== Sources ==
- Araujo Bojórquez, Alfonso (2002). Series del Caribe: narraciones y estadisticas, 1949–2001. Colegio de Bachilleres del Estado de Sinaloa. ISBN 968-73-0067-1
- Figueredo, Jorge S. (2011). Cuban Baseball: A Statistical History, 1878–1961. Macfarland & Company. ISBN 978-0-78-646425-8
- Johnson, Lloyd; Wolff, Miles (1993). Encyclopedia of Minor League Baseball. Baseball America. ISBN 978-0-96-371898-3
- Nuñez, José Antero (1994). Serie del Caribe de la Habana a Puerto la Cruz. JAN Editor. ISBN 980-07-2389-7
