= Hank Izquierdo =

Cuban baseball player (1931-2015)

- Catcher
- Born: March 20, 1931; Pueblo Nuevo, Matanzas
- Died: July 31, 2015 (aged 84); West Palm Beach, Florida, U.S.
- Batted: Right Threw: Right

MLB debut
- August 9, 1967, for the Minnesota Twins

Last MLB appearance
- September 27, 1967, for the Minnesota Twins

MLB statistics
- Batting average: .269
- On-base percentage: .296
- Slugging average: .346
- Runs scored: 4
- Runs batted in: 2
- Stats at Baseball Reference

Teams
- Minnesota Twins (1967)

Enrique Roberto "Hank" Izquierdo Valdés (March 20, 1931 – July 31, 2015) was a Cuban-born professional baseball catcher, coach, manager and scout for almost four decades. He made his playing debut in Major League Baseball at the age of 36 and in his 17th professional season as a member of the Minnesota Twins during their 1967 season, appearing in 16 games played. It was his only MLB playing opportunity.

Listed at 5' 11" (1.80 m), 175 lb. (79 k), Izquierdo batted and threw right handed. He was a solid defensive catcher but a modest hitter who spent 23 seasons in the minor leagues — five of them in the Mexican League — and also played winter ball in Venezuela.

== Baseball career ==
=== In Cuba ===
Born in the neighborhood of Pueblo Nuevo in Matanzas, Izquierdo was originally a middle infielder and third baseman with good range and ability to turn and complete a double play. Eventually, he made the conversion to catcher successfully, to become one of the best defensive backstops Cuba ever produced. According to those who saw him play, Izquierdo was magnificent at all the intangible things that a catcher does, like calling the game, working the pitch counts, framing pitches and blocking home plate, which combined with a fine defense and a strong and secure throwing arm.

Izquierdo entered the Cuban League with the Elefantes de Cienfuegos, playing for them during the 1954–1955 season before joining the Alacranes de Almendares from 1955 through 1961. Almendares won easily the 1958-1959 pennant. As the league champions, the team represented Cuba in the 1959 Caribbean Series held in Caracas, where he guided a pitching staff that included Mike Cuellar, Art Fowler, Camilo Pascual and Orlando Peña, while the Cuban team captured the competition with a 5–1 record.

=== Minor leagues ===
Izquierdo started his organized baseball career in 1951 with the Galveston White Caps of the Gulf Coast League, playing for them three years before joining the Winston-Salem Twins of the Carolina League in 1954. He then signed a contract with the Cleveland Indians organization in 1955, and was assigned to its Double-A affiliate Keokuk Kernels. He hit a .302 average with a .427 slugging percentage along with 29 doubles, five triples and seven home runs in 119 games for Keokuk. After that he moved around for a while, playing in the Baltimore Orioles and Cincinnati Reds Minor League systems from 1956 through 1961.

In 1957 Izquierdo reported to the Havana Sugar Kings, which played in the International League as the Triple A affiliate of the Cincinnati Reds, while playing their home games at Gran Estadio de La Habana. The Sugar Kings won the League championship in 1959, and then ended up winning the 1959 Little World Series over the Minneapolis Millers of the American Association in seven thrilling games.

By 1960, Izquierdo attended the Sugar Kings spring training camp following his winter season in Cuba. On July 13 of this year, the International League announced that the Havana Sugar Kings would play the remainder of their home season in Jersey City, New Jersey, because of the increasingly strained relations between the United States and Cuba governments following the Cuban Revolution of 1959. As a result, Izquierdo and the other 10 native Cuban players decided to remain with the Jersey City Jerseys in its new home. In 1962, Izquierdo spent the season in Major League Baseball as the bullpen catcher for the Indians, whose general manager was former Cincinnati executive Gabe Paul.

=== Minnesota Twins ===
Izquierdo returned to the active list the following season and played for the Twins organization during five seasons spanning 1963–1967. Overall, he hit .273 with five home runs and 161 RBI in 515 minor league games. When he was called up to the majors in August 1967, he set the record at the time for the oldest rookie debut in MLB history. In 16 games for the 1967 Twins, he posted an average of .269 (7-for-26) with two doubles, two RBI and four runs scored. He was Minnesota's starting catcher in nine games. Highlights included back-to back games on August 23 and 24 against the Detroit Tigers, in which Izquierdo collected four hits in seven at bats, including a double and one run batted in, as Minnesota won both games. The victories were crucial, as Minnesota and Detroit were embroiled in a four-team struggle for the 1967 American League pennant. The four safeties raised Izquierdo's average from .200 to .417. But he collected only two hits the rest of the way to lower his batting mark to .269, and Minnesota and Detroit were beaten out on the season's last day by the Boston Red Sox for the AL flag.

=== Later career ===
Izquierdo then moved to the Houston Astros organization and was assigned to their Triple-A affiliate Oklahoma City 89ers from 1968 to 1969, where he served as a coach and utility man. He was used sparingly in both seasons, hitting .263 in 131 games, while playing at all positions except shortstop.

In July 1969, Izquierdo was suspended for the remainder of the American Association season and fined $750 as the result of his part in a bat-swinging incident with catcher Ted Simmons, by then a 19-year rookie who played for the Tulsa Oilers. Izquierdo had just scored one run for Oklahoma City and was clearing the plate area of a bat when he and Simmons exchanged words. They then engaged in a shoving match and Simmons suffered a bruised thumb while trying to wrest the bat from Izquierdo. During the offseason, Izquierdo suffered a near-fatal gunshot wound in Miami, when the taxi he was driving was robbed and he was shot in the stomach.

Izquierdo spent the remainder of his career bouncing around the Mexican League, where he played and managed from 1970 through 1974 for the Rojos del Águila de Veracruz (1970–1971; 1974) and the Leones de Yucatán (1972–1973). He returned in 1976 to manage the Saraperos de Saltillo. He later scouted for the Twins for more than 10 years.

In between, Izquierdo played winter ball for the Industriales de Valencia and Tigres de Aragua clubs of the Venezuelan Professional Baseball League in four seasons between 1965 and 1968. Overall, he hit .278 and slugged .328 with 63 RBI in 142 games.

Izquierdo was a long time resident of West Palm Beach, Florida, where he died in 2015 at the age of 84.
