= Latin American Series (1952) =

Baseball competition held in Caracas in 1952

Tournament details
- Country: Venezuela
- City: Caracas
- Venue: Estadio Universitario de Caracas
- Dates: March 2–23, 1952
- Teams: 4

Final positions
- Champions: Cuba
- Runners-up: Venezuela

Tournament statistics
- Games played: 18

The Latin American Series (Spanish: Serie Latinoamericana) was a one-time international baseball tournament held in Caracas, Venezuela in March 1952. Envisioned as an alternative to the Caribbean Series contested by national teams, its rosters were made up of professional baseball players, rather than the non-professional amateurs that played in Olympic-style competitions at the time (like the Amateur World Series).

The tournament saw the debut of the Estadio Universitario, which would go on to be the longtime home of the Leones del Caracas and Tiburones de La Guaira of the Venezuelan Professional Baseball League. The Dominican Republic's José St. Claire would be the first player to hit a home run in the stadium. (Note: Luis "Camaleón" García would be the first Venezuelan player to hit a home run in the Universitario, in an 8–5 win over the Dominican Republic.)

== Tournament summary ==
In the opening game, on March 3, pitcher José "Carrao" Bracho propelled Venezuela to an 11-inning, 3–2 win over Colombia. Emilio Cueche became the first player in Venezuelan professional baseball history to throw a shutout, in a 7–0 victory over the Dominican Republic.

Some players had to leave the tournament early due to the start of spring training, such as including Cuban big leaguer Sandy Amorós, who left to practice with the Los Angeles Dodgers in Vero Beach. Venezuela's José Bracho also left early, to play with the Triple-A Toronto Maple Leafs.

== Standings ==
Pos	Team	Pld	W	L	RF	RA	RD	PCT	GB
1	Cuba	9	7	2	44	30	+14	.778	—
2	Venezuela (H)	9	5	4	39	35	+4	.556	2
3	Dominican Republic	9	3	6	20	32	−12	.333	4
4	Colombia	9	3	6	26	32	−6	.333	4

Source: The Sporting News
(H) Hosts

=== Results ===
2 March 1952	Venezuela	3–2 (F/11)	Colombia	Estadio Universitario de Caracas
2 March 1952	WP: Aureliano Patiño	Boxscore	LP: Julio Florez	Estadio Universitario de Caracas

4 March 1952	Cuba	2–1 (F/10)	Dominican Republic	Estadio Universitario de Caracas
4 March 1952	WP: Armando Roche	Boxscore	LP: Manuel Cáceres	Estadio Universitario de Caracas
4 March 1952		Boxscore	HR: José St. Claire	Estadio Universitario de Caracas

5 March 1952	Cuba	5–6	Colombia	Estadio Universitario de Caracas
5 March 1952	LP: Roque Contreras	Boxscore	WP: Catano Acosta	Estadio Universitario de Caracas

6 March 1952	Venezuela	6–0	Dominican Republic	Estadio Universitario de Caracas
6 March 1952	WP: Emilio Cueche	Boxscore	LP: Luis Martinez	Estadio Universitario de Caracas

8 March 1952	Dominican Republic	1–0	Colombia	Estadio Universitario de Caracas
8 March 1952	WP: Miguel Payano	Boxscore	LP: Roberto Zapata	Estadio Universitario de Caracas

9 March 1952	Cuba	5–4	Venezuela	Estadio Universitario de Caracas
9 March 1952	WP: Armando Roche	Boxscore	LP: José Bracho	Estadio Universitario de Caracas

10 March 1952	Venezuela	3–4	Colombia	Estadio Universitario de Caracas
10 March 1952	LP: Julián Ladera	Boxscore	WP: Manuel Verecco Gomez	Estadio Universitario de Caracas

12 March 1952	Cuba	7–1	Dominican Republic	Estadio Universitario de Caracas
12 March 1952	WP: Santiago Ullrich	Boxscore	LP: Manuel Cáceres	Estadio Universitario de Caracas
12 March 1952	HR: Edmundo Amorós	Boxscore		Estadio Universitario de Caracas

13 March 1952	Venezuela	2–5	Dominican Republic	Estadio Universitario de Caracas
13 March 1952	LP: Emilio Cueche	Boxscore	WP: Miguel Payano	Estadio Universitario de Caracas

15 March 1952	Colombia	7–8 (F/10)	Cuba	Estadio Universitario de Caracas
15 March 1952	LP: Manuel Verecco Gomez	Boxscore	WP: Roque Contreras	Estadio Universitario de Caracas
15 March 1952	HR: Pedro Miranda	Boxscore		Estadio Universitario de Caracas

16 March 1952	Colombia	2–1	Dominican Republic	Estadio Universitario de Caracas
16 March 1952	WP: Manuel Verecco Gomez	Boxscore	LP: José Mattos	Estadio Universitario de Caracas

16 March 1952	Venezuela	3–8	Cuba	Estadio Universitario de Caracas
16 March 1952	LP: Emilio Cueche	Boxscore	WP: Eusebio Silverio Perez	Estadio Universitario de Caracas

17 March 1952	Colombia	3–4	Venezuela	Estadio Universitario de Caracas
17 March 1952	LP: Roberto Zapata	Boxscore	WP: Emilio Cueche	Estadio Universitario de Caracas

19 March 1952	Dominican Republic	1–4	Cuba	Estadio Universitario de Caracas
19 March 1952	LP: Miguel Payano	Boxscore	WP: Armando Roche	Estadio Universitario de Caracas
19 March 1952	HR: José St. Claire	Boxscore		Estadio Universitario de Caracas

20 March 1952	Dominican Republic	5–8	Venezuela	Estadio Universitario de Caracas
20 March 1952	LP: José Mattos	Boxscore	WP: Emilio Cueche	Estadio Universitario de Caracas
20 March 1952		Boxscore	HR: Luis García	Estadio Universitario de Caracas

22 March 1952	Cuba	2–1	Colombia	Estadio Universitario de Caracas
22 March 1952	WP: Roque Contreras	Boxscore	LP: Cipriano Herrera	Estadio Universitario de Caracas

23 March 1952	Dominican Republic	5–1	Colombia	Estadio Universitario de Caracas
23 March 1952	WP: Manuel Cáceres	Boxscore	LP: Manuel Verecco Gomez	Estadio Universitario de Caracas

23 March 1952	Venezuela	6–3	Cuba	Estadio Universitario de Caracas
23 March 1952		Boxscore		Estadio Universitario de Caracas

== See also ==
- 1952 Caribbean Series held in Panama
- 1952 Amateur World Series held in Cuba
- Baseball at the 1950 Central American and Caribbean Games
- Baseball at the 1951 Pan American Games
