= Angel Scull =

Cuban baseball player

- Outfielder
- Born: October 2, 1928; Matanzas, Cuba
- Died: February 14, 2005 (aged 76); Miami, Florida, U.S.
- Batted: Right Threw: Right
Medals
Men's baseball
Representing Cuba
Central American and Caribbean Games
Pan American Games
Gold medal – first place	1951 Buenos Aires	Team

Angel Scull Saez (October 2, 1928 – February 14, 2005) was a Cuban professional baseball outfielder. Listed at 5' 8", 165 lb., he batted and threw right handed.

Born in Matanzas, Scull was known as a line-drive hitter and speedy base runner. In addition, he was a fine defensive player at all three outfield positions, playing mainly as a center fielder for the Alacranes de Almendares during his ten seasons in the Cuban League from 1951–1952 through 1960–1961.

Scull was also a member of the Cuban baseball team which won the gold medal in the 1951 Pan American Games held in Buenos Aires, Argentina. During the tournament, he led all players in runs batted in (14) and stolen bases (4) while tying for the most home runs (3).

Scull won the Cuban League batting crown with a .370 average during the 1954–1955 season. Besides, he captured five stolen base titles from 1953–1954 through 1955–1956 and 1958–1959 to 1959–1960. In a 10-season career, he posted an average of .277 (593-for-2149) with 15 home runs and 207 runs batted in, scoring 299 runs and stealing 87 bases, while collecting 74 doubles and 31 triples.

In 1951, Scull trained with the Washington Senators team of the American League then was assigned to Class D Wellsville Rockets, where he hit for a .329 average in 124 games and led the Pony League in stolen bases.

He stayed in the minor leagues through 1969, which included 14 Triple A seasons with the Charleston Senators, Havana Sugar Kings, Toronto Maple Leafs, Montreal Royals, Syracuse Chiefs, Atlanta Crackers, Vancouver Mounties, and Petroleros de Poza Rica.

Scull enjoyed a career highlight while playing with Almendares in the 1954 Caribbean Series, when he batted .391 and amassed a .522 slugging average, leading the Series with five runs scored. He also tied with teammate Sam Chapman and Joe Tuminelli of the Panamanian team for the second-best average behind Puerto Rico's outfielder Jim Rivera (.450).

In 1997 Scull was enshrined into the Cuban Baseball Hall of Fame based in Miami, Florida.

He died in 2005 at the age of 77.
