= Industriales de Valencia =

The Industriales de Valencia was a baseball club who played from 1955 through 1968 in the Venezuelan Professional Baseball League. The Industriales joined the league as a replacement for the Santa Marta BBC.

The Industriales were based at Valencia, the capital city of Carabobo state, and played their home games at Estadio Cuatricentenario.

The Valencia club won five season titles, four championships and three sub-championships in its 13-season history, representing Venezuela in the first stage of the Caribbean Series in the 1956 and 1958 tournaments. It also won the 1961 Interamerican Series.

Despite their successful performance at the league, the Industriales folded in 1968 due to low attendance numbers. They relocated to Portuguesa state for the 1968–1969 season, and were renamed Llaneros de Acarigua.

== Yearly team records ==
Season	Record	Finish	Manager	Notes
1955-56	33-21	1st	Regino Otero	Championship title
1956-57	12-14 (1st half); 18-8 (2nd half)	4th 1st	Regino Otero	Lost championship series
1957-58	23-18	1st	Regino Otero	1st round series winner 2nd round series winner Championship title
1958-59	28-18	1st	Regino Otero	Lost semifinal round
1959-60	16-13	--	Jim Fanning	Season suspended by players' strike
1960-61	30-22	1st	Rodolfo Fernández	Won semifinal round Championship title
1961-62	21-30	3rd	Rodolfo Fernández; Julio Bracho	Did not qualify for the playoffs
1962-63	23-16	1st	Robert Hoffman	Won semifinal round Championship title
1963-64	26-24	(tied for 1st)	Dave Bristol	Lost championship series
1964-65	25-25	3rd	Rodolfo Fernández; Robert Davis	Did not qualify for the playoffs
1965-66	36-24	2nd	Johnny Lipon	Won semifinal round Lost championship series
1966-67	32-30	(tied for 3rd)	Johnny Lipon	Lost semifinal round
1967-68	27-23	4th	Mel McGaha; Alfonso Carrasquel	Did not qualify for the playoffs

== All-time roster ==
- Teolindo Acosta
- Joe Altobelli
- Carlos Ascanio
- Ed Bailey
- Bob Balcena
- Earl Battey
- Larry Bearnarth
- Babe Birrer
- Dámaso Blanco
- Gary Blaylock
- Ángel Bravo
- Tommy Brown
- Billy Bryan
- Don Bryant
- Elio Chacón
- Emilio Cueche
- Mike Cuellar
- George Culver
- Gary Dotter
- Bobby Durnbaugh
- Dick Egan
- Turk Farrell
- Hank Foiles
- Jim Frey
- Adrian Garrett
- Gustavo Gil
- Lenny Green
- Joe Hague
- Steve Hargan
- Ken Harrelson
- Jim Hicks
- Enrique Izquierdo
- Deron Johnson
- Lou Johnson
- Dick Kenworthy
- Ed Kirkpatrick
- Julián Ladera
- Dick LeMay
- Lou Limmer
- Jim McGlothlin
- Leo Marentette
- Héctor Martínez
- Lee May
- Ed Mickelson
- Bob Miller (LHP)
- Bob Miller (RHP)
- Jesús Mora
- Daniel Morejón
- Bubba Morton
- Mo Mozzali
- Ron Mrozinski
- Roberto Muñoz
- Red Murff
- Howie Nunn
- Jim Owens
- Jim Pearce
- Aaron Pointer
- Rudy Regalado
- Tommie Reynolds
- Tony Roig
- Chico Ruiz
- Ed Sadowski
- Ken Sanders
- Diego Seguí
- R. C. Stevens
- Dean Stone
- Luis Tiant
- Ken Turner
- Bruce Von Hoff

== Sources ==
- Gutiérrez, Daniel; Alvarez, Efraim; Gutiérrez (h), Daniel (2006). La Enciclopedia del Béisbol en Venezuela. LVBP, Caracas. ISBN 980-6996-02-X
- PuraPelota.com – Industriales de Valencia
- es.Wikipedia.org – Industriales de Valencia
