= 1961 Interamerican Series =

1961 baseball tournament

Tournament details
- Country: Venezuela
- City: Caracas
- Venue: 1 (in 1 host city)
- Dates: 10–15 February
- Teams: 4

Final positions
- Champions: (Venezuela) Industriales de Valencia (2nd title)
- Runners-up: (Venezuela) Rapiños de Occidente

The 1961 Interamerican Series (Spanish: Serie Interamericana) was a baseball tournament held from February 10 through February 15, 1961. It was the first tournament held under that name since 1949, after the 1961 Caribbean Series, originally scheduled to be held in Havana, was cancelled due to the Cuban Revolution.

Since the first Caribbean Series in 1949 (and the earlier Interamerican Series in 1946), this was the first major international club competition in the Americas not to feature a representative from the Cuban Winter League, which would fold later that year. It instead featured two representatives from Venezuela's two leagues, Central League (Industriales de Valencia) and Occidental League (Rapiños de Occidente). It also featured the champion teams from Panama (Cerveza Balboa) and Puerto Rico (Senadores de San Juan).

== Background ==
After the 1960 Caribbean Series, MLB Commissioner Ford Frick banned American players from playing in Cuba for the 1960-61 winter season. 1960 champion Cienfuegos won the league, albeit with no American import players, but was not invited to the 1961 series. It would be the last season of the original Cuban League, as the Fidel Castro government decreed the abolition of professional sport in Cuba, forming the Cuban National Series.

In lieu of the Caribbean Series, which had been planned for Havana in 1961, the Caribbean Professional Baseball Confederation selected Venezuela to host an Interamerican Series.

Four future members of the National Baseball Hall of Fame saw action in the series: Roberto Clemente and Orlando Cepeda with the Senadores, Bob Gibson with Valencia and Luis Aparicio with the Rapiños.

== Participating teams ==
Team	Manager	Means of qualification
(Panama) Cerveza Balboa	(Panama) León Kellman	Winners of the 1960–61 Panamanian Professional Baseball League
(Puerto Rico) Senadores de San Juan	(United States) Lum Harris	Winners of the 1960–61 Puerto Rican Winter League
(Venezuela) Rapiños de Occidente	(United States) Les Moss	Winners of the 1960–61 Occidental Professional Baseball League
(Venezuela) Industriales de Valencia	(Cuba) Rodolfo Fernández	Winners of the 1960–61 Venezuelan Professional Baseball League
