= Rudy Fernández (baseball) =

Cuban baseball player (born 1911)

- Pitcher
- Born: June 27, 1911; Guanabacoa, Cuba
- Died: September 6, 2000 (aged 89); New York, New York. U.S.
- Batted: Right Threw: Right

Negro league baseball debut
- 1932, for the Cuban Stars (East)

Last appearance
- 1946, for the New York Black Yankees
- Stats at Baseball Reference

Teams
- Cuban Stars (East) (1932–1934); New York Cubans (1935); Cuban Stars (East) (1936); New York Cubans (1939, 1943–1944); New York Black Yankees (1946)

Rodolfo "Rudy" Fernández Marín (June 27, 1911 – September 6, 2000) was a Cuban professional baseball pitcher in the American Negro leagues in the 1930s and 1940s.

A native of Guanabacoa, Cuba, Fernández was the brother of fellow Negro leaguer José Fernández. Younger brother Rudy broke into the Negro leagues in 1932 with the Cuban Stars (East), and pitched for over a decade, ending his career with the New York Black Yankees in 1946. He tossed shutout wins against both the New York Giants and Brooklyn Dodgers in exhibition games in Havana.

After his playing career ended, Fernández managed in the Venezuelan Professional Baseball League, leading the Industriales de Valencia to a league championship and Interamerican Series appearance in 1961. He died in New York, New York in 2000 at age 89.
