= Sandy Ullrich =

Cuban baseball player

- Pitcher
- Born: July 25, 1921; Havana, Cuba
- Died: April 21, 2001 (aged 79); Miami, Florida, U.S.
- Batted: Right Threw: Right

MLB debut
- May 3, 1944, for the Washington Senators

Last MLB appearance
- September 16, 1945, for the Washington Senators

MLB statistics
- Win–loss record: 3–3
- Earned run average: 5.04
- Strikeouts: 28
- Stats at Baseball Reference

Teams
- Washington Senators (1944–1945)
Medals
Men's baseball
Representing Cuba
Latin American Series
Gold medal – first place	1952 Caracas	Team

Carlos Santiago Ullrich (July 25, 1921 – April 21, 2001) was a Major League Baseball starting pitcher, born in Havana, Cuba. Ullrich signed on to play Major League Baseball in the Washington Senators organization. He batted and threw right-handed during his baseball career.

== Career ==
At the age of 22, Ullrich made his Major League debut on May 3, 1944, going two and third innings while giving up one earned run. Ullrich pitched nine and two-thirds innings that year, giving up ten earned runs for an earned run average of 9.31. The next year the Senators and Ullrich were better statistically than in the 1944 season. Ullrich at the time was just 23 years old, the second youngest regular on the Senators staff. Ullrich pitched 81 and one third innings for the second place Senators. This was in 28 games, six games started. In 1945 Ullrich tied for eighth with 15 games finished. On August 12, 1945, Ulrich notched his one and only career save in a game against the St. Louis Browns. Ullrich played his final Major League game on September 16 of 1945.

At the time of his retirement Ullrich had a 3–3 record, a 5.04 ERA, 38 walks, and 28 strikeouts. Ullrich was 7 for 25 hitting, with a lifetime batting average of .280. His lifetime fielding percentage was 1.000.

== Background ==
Ullrich's career took place during World War II. With many baseball stars leaving to serve the United States, it was questioned whether Major League Baseball would continue during this period. Franklin D. Roosevelt declared that it would, and therefore teams needed players to fill the spots of players that had left. Ullrich was one of the many that played Major League Baseball during this period. Unfortunately for Ullrich, when the war ended players returned to their teams. Like many others, Ullrich found himself out of the Major Leagues.
