= Thornton Kipper =

American baseball player

- Pitcher
- Born: September 27, 1928; Bagley, Wisconsin, U.S.
- Died: March 29, 2006 (aged 77); Scottsdale, Arizona, U.S.
- Batted: Right Threw: Right

MLB debut
- June 7, 1953, for the Philadelphia Phillies

Last MLB appearance
- July 17, 1955, for the Philadelphia Phillies

MLB statistics
- Win–loss record: 3–4
- Earned run average: 5.27
- Innings pitched: 99
- Stats at Baseball Reference

Teams
- Philadelphia Phillies (1953–1955)

Thornton John Kipper (September 27, 1928 – March 29, 2006) was an American pitcher in Major League Baseball who played from 1953 through 1955 for the Philadelphia Phillies. Listed at 6 ft 3 in (1.91 m), 190 lb (86 kg), Kipper batted and threw right-handed. He was born in Bagley, Wisconsin and attended Bagley High School.

A standout pitcher in college, Kipper spent one year (1946) at the University of Wisconsin–Madison before joining the U.S. Navy during peacetime. After being discharged in 1948, he returned to school and played for the UW team from 1949 to 1950. In that last season he posted an 11–1 record, and later went 5–0 in the Big Ten Conference. He also recorded two victories during the 1950 College World Series and made the All-Star team. Together with catcher Bob Wilson, Kipper formed one of the Big Ten Conference's top batteries. Dynie Mansfield was Kipper's college coach and mentor.

After graduating in 1951, Kipper was signed by the Phillies. In a three-season career, he went 3–4 with 35 strikeouts and a 5.27 ERA in 55 appearances, including three starts, one save, and 99.0 innings of work.

Following his majors career, Kipper pitched in the Kansas City Athletics minor league system. He also played for the Magallanes team of the Venezuelan Winter League (1953–54) and in the 1954 Caribbean Series.

After retirement from baseball, he ran a pizza business out of Scottsdale, Arizona. Kipper died in Scottadale at age 77.
