= Jack Cassini =

American baseball player (1919–2010)

- Pinch runner
- Born: October 26, 1919; Dearborn, Michigan, U.S.
- Died: September 20, 2010 (aged 90); Mesa, Arizona, U.S.
- Batted: Right Threw: Right

MLB debut
- April 19, 1949, for the Pittsburgh Pirates

Last MLB appearance
- May 6, 1949, for the Pittsburgh Pirates

MLB statistics
- Games played: 8
- Runs scored: 3
- Stats at Baseball Reference

Teams
- Pittsburgh Pirates (1949)

Jack Dempsey Cassini (October 26, 1919 – September 20, 2010) was an American professional baseball infielder, manager and scout. Born in Dearborn, Michigan, he was a six-time stolen base champion during his minor league playing career (1940–41; 1946–55) and stole 378 bases lifetime.

Cassini threw and batted right-handed, stood 5 ft 10 in (1.78 m) tall and weighed 175 pounds (79 kg). His career began with the Tiffin Mud Hens of the Class D Ohio State League in 1940, where he batted .396 and stole 51 bases in only 99 games. The following year, Cassini led the Class C Pioneer League in steals with 43, before spending four years in World War II military service. After a 1946 campaign split between the Triple-A International and Double-A Texas leagues (and 26 more thefts), Cassini then spent full seasons in the Texas League (1947) and the Triple-A American Association (1948) — and led those leagues in stolen bases as well (with 52 and 33, respectively).

In 1949, he received his only trial in Major League Baseball as a pinch runner in eight games for the Pittsburgh Pirates. Cassini scored three runs, but stole no bases and never recorded an official at bat. He then returned to the American Association — leading it in stolen bases two more times, with 36 (1950) and 35 (1952).

Cassini then fashioned a long career as a minor league manager and MLB scout. He skippered teams in the Chicago White Sox, Cincinnati Reds, New York Mets and Cleveland Indians farm systems, and scouted for Cincinnati, the Mets and Cleveland.
