= Bobby Prescott =

Panamanian baseball player (1931–2020)

- Pinch hitter / Left fielder
- Born: March 27, 1931; Colón, Panama
- Died: August 2, 2020 (aged 89); Panama City
- Batted: Right Threw: Right

MLB debut
- June 17, 1961, for the Kansas City Athletics

Last MLB appearance
- July 1, 1961, for the Kansas City Athletics

MLB statistics
- Batting average: .083
- Home runs: 0
- Runs batted in: 0
- Stats at Baseball Reference

Teams
- Kansas City Athletics (1961)

George Bertrand "Bobby" Prescott (March 27, 1931 – August 2, 2020) was a Panamanian professional baseball player, an outfielder, first baseman and third baseman who had a 19-year career, from 1952–1970, in North American minor league baseball and a brief trial with the 1961 Kansas City Athletics of the Major Leagues. He was a prolific home run hitter during his minor league career, smashing 398 round-trippers in 7,482 at bats, eclipsing the 30-home run mark five times, and twice leading the Mexican League in that category.

Born in Colón, Prescott batted and threw right-handed, stood 5 feet 11 inches (1.80 m) tall and weighed 180 pounds (82 kg). He initially signed with the Pittsburgh Pirates in 1952, and led the Class A Western League in runs scored (137) in 1954. He played in 143 games for the 1955 Hollywood Stars of the Open-Classification Pacific Coast League, then was drafted by the New York Giants. Prescott played five years at the Class A, Double-A and Triple-A levels of the Giants' farm system, and batted over .300 for the 1958–1959 Phoenix Giants before being acquired by the Athletics prior to the 1961 season.

In 1961, Prescott put up his best Triple-A season, batting .301 with 32 homers and 101 runs batted in for the Hawaii Islanders. The season was also marked by Prescott's only MLB service. Recalled by the Athletics in June, he appeared in ten games, starting two games in left field, pinch hitting in seven, and appearing in one contest as a pinch runner. On June 27, Prescott recorded his only Major League hit, a single off Billy Hoeft of the Baltimore Orioles in a pinch-hitting role.

Prescott returned to the PCL for the balance of 1961 and all of 1962, then spent the final eight seasons of his playing career in the Mexican League, belting 37, 39, 41, 32 and 26 home runs in consecutive seasons (1964–1968).
