= Howie Fox =

American baseball player (1921–1955)

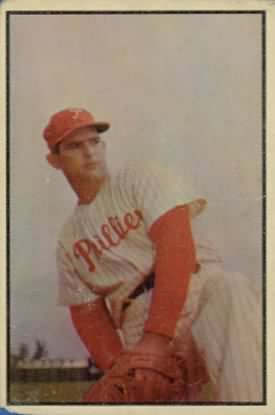
- Pitcher
- Born: March 1, 1921; Coburg, Oregon, U.S.
- Died: October 9, 1955 (aged 34); San Antonio, Texas, U.S.
- Batted: Right Threw: Right

MLB debut
- September 17, 1944, for the Cincinnati Reds

Last MLB appearance
- September 25, 1954, for the Baltimore Orioles

MLB statistics
- Win–loss record: 43–72
- Earned run average: 4.33
- Strikeouts: 342
- Stats at Baseball Reference

Teams
- Cincinnati Reds (1944–1946, 1948–1951); Philadelphia Phillies (1952); Baltimore Orioles (1954)

Howard Francis Fox (March 1, 1921 – October 9, 1955) was an American professional baseball pitcher, who played in Major League Baseball (MLB) for the Cincinnati Reds, Philadelphia Phillies, and Baltimore Orioles, in 9 seasons, between 1944 and 1954. During his playing days, Fox stood 6 feet 3 inches (1.91 m), weighing 210 pounds (95 kg). He batted and threw right-handed.

The year after Fox's last big league appearance, he bought a local tavern in San Antonio, while he pitched for the Missions of the Double-A Texas League; a month into the offseason, he was stabbed to death at age 34 during a disturbance at that establishment.

== Early life ==
Fox was born in Coburg, Oregon. He played baseball and basketball at the University of Oregon. Signed by the Cincinnati Reds as a free agent in 1943, he played for a Pioneer League team in Ogden, Utah, in 1943, followed by stints with minor league teams in Birmingham and Syracuse.

== Major league career ==
A hard thrower with a sharp curveball, Fox debuted in MLB in 1944 with the Reds, playing seven years before joining the Philadelphia Phillies, in 1952, and the Baltimore Orioles, in 1954. His most productive season came in 1950, for Cincinnati, when he went 11–8, a year after his 6–19 record gave him the most losses of any pitcher in the major leagues. In 1951, Fox collected nine victories, with a 3.83 earned run average (ERA), in a career-high 228 innings, but suffered 14 losses.

Before the 1952 season, Fox was dealt to Philadelphia with Smoky Burgess and Connie Ryan, in exchange for Niles Jordan, Eddie Pellagrini, Andy Seminick, and Dick Sisler. In 1953, he played for Triple-A Baltimore, and he appeared in 38 games for the MLB Orioles in 1954, their first year in MLB since 1902.

In nine major league seasons, Fox posted a 43–72 record, with 342 strikeouts, a 4.33 ERA, in 248 appearances, including 132 starts, 42 complete games, five shutouts, six saves, and 1,108 1/3 innings of work. In 253 games, Fox hit .189, with two home runs, and 25 runs batted in (RBI).

Fox also played in the Venezuelan Winter League (1953–1955) and in the 1954 Caribbean Series. In the Venezuelan Winter League, he was pitching for Pastora when popular player Luis Aparicio, Sr., of Gavilanes took himself out of a 1953 game and allowed his son, Luis Aparicio, to pinch hit for his first professional baseball at bat. The younger Aparicio became a star MLB player and member of the Baseball Hall of Fame.

== Death ==
While he was a minor league pitcher in the Texas League for the San Antonio Missions in 1955, Fox purchased a San Antonio tavern. That October, he was attempting to kick three men out of the bar when a struggle ensued in front of the tavern. Fox was stabbed three times and died as he was trying to crawl back to the door of the establishment. A San Antonio College student, John Strickland, was arrested and two other men were held as material witnesses. Strickland was charged with murder with malice and another man was indicted on an aggravated assault charge in the stabbing injury of Fox's bartender, who was critically injured.
