= Norm Cash =

American baseball player (1933–1986)

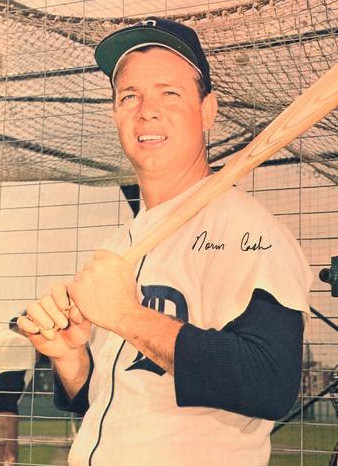
- Cash in 1966
- First baseman
- Born: November 10, 1933; Justiceburg, Texas, U.S.
- Died: October 11, 1986 (aged 52); Beaver Island, Michigan, U.S.
- Batted: Left Threw: Left

MLB debut
- June 18, 1958, for the Chicago White Sox

Last MLB appearance
- August 6, 1974, for the Detroit Tigers

MLB statistics
- Batting average: .271
- Home runs: 377
- Runs batted in: 1,104
- Stats at Baseball Reference

Teams
- Chicago White Sox (1958–1959); Detroit Tigers (1960–1974)

Career highlights and awards
- 5× All-Star (1961, 1961², 1966, 1971, 1972); World Series champion (1968); AL batting champion (1961)

Norman Dalton Cash (November 10, 1933 – October 11, 1986) was an American Major League Baseball first baseman who spent almost his entire career with the Detroit Tigers. A power hitter, his 377 career home runs were the fourth most by an American League left-handed hitter when he retired, behind Babe Ruth, Ted Williams and Lou Gehrig; his 373 home runs with the Tigers is tied for second in franchise history with Miguel Cabrera, behind Al Kaline (399). He also led the AL in assists three times and fielding percentage twice; he ranked among the all-time leaders in assists (4th with 1,317) and double plays (10th with 1,347) upon his retirement, and was fifth in AL history in games at first base (1,943). He was known to fans and teammates during his playing days as "Stormin' Norman."

== Early life ==
Cash was born in Justiceburg, Garza County, Texas, and attended (what was then) Sul Ross State Teachers College, where he was All-Lone Star Conference in football as well as playing baseball; he was drafted by the Chicago Bears as a running back in 1955, but declined to play pro football.

== MLB career ==
=== Early career ===
After signing with the Chicago White Sox in 1955, he spent 1957 in the military and made his debut with the team in 1958, seeing limited play as an outfielder and pinch hitter. He appeared in 58 games for the 1959 AL pennant-winners; the August 25 acquisition of Ted Kluszewski left him on the White Sox bench. He was hitless in four pinch-hitting appearances in the World Series. In December of that year, he was traded to the Cleveland Indians in an eight-player deal that brought Minnie Miñoso back to Chicago, but Indians' general manager Frank Lane traded Cash to Detroit for Steve Demeter, who would play only four more major league games. Both Chicago and Cleveland would be haunted by Cash for the next 15 years, as he won a batting title in 1961 and a World Series ring in 1968 wearing a Detroit uniform.

=== Detroit Tigers ===
Cash filled the middle of the Tigers lineup for 15 seasons as part of one of the sport's top offenses.

In 1960, Cash grounded into no double plays, the first American League player with at least 400 plate appearances in a season to accomplish that since league records on this stat were started in 1940.

Cash enjoyed a breakout season in 1961, one of the most unlikely by any player in major league history. Even though the veteran had never hit higher than .286 above the B level in three previous seasons, he led the AL with a .361 average, while posting 193 hits (tied for first in the AL), 41 home runs (sixth), 132 runs batted in (fourth), 119 runs scored (fourth), 124 walks (second) for a .487 on-base percentage (first), and 354 total bases (second) for a .662 slugging average (second); but his season was overshadowed by the 61 home runs of Roger Maris, and teammate Rocky Colavito finished with more home runs and RBI. Still, his .361 average would be the highest by any major league player in the 1960s, and would not be topped by another Tiger until Magglio Ordóñez hit .363 in 2007. The Tigers finished 101–61 for their best regular-season record since 1934, and scored the most runs in baseball, though they finished second in the AL, eight games behind the New York Yankees; Cash was fourth in the MVP voting.

In future years, Cash openly admitted to using an illegal corked bat during the 1961 season among others. He drilled a hole in his bats and filled it with a mixture of sawdust, cork and glue, an art that was taught to him in the minor leagues. (Studies done many years later concluded that corked bats provided little-to-no benefit except to serve as a significant psychological boost for their users.) His 1961 statistics turned out to be career highs which he did not come close to approaching again — in later years, he never reached 100 runs or 100 RBI, and never batted above .283. His 118-point drop to a .243 average in 1962 was the largest ever by a batting champion, though he nearly matched his home run output from the previous season with 39.

Cash later said of the 1961 season: "It was a freak. Even at the time, I realized that. Everything I hit seemed to drop in, even when I didn't make good contact. I never thought I'd do it again."

Pitcher Mickey Lolich once asked Cash why he never hit for a high average after that season. "He told me, 'Jim Campbell pays me to hit home runs,'" said Lolich, referring to the team's general manager in those years. "Norm then said, 'I can get hits if I want to, just watch tomorrow.' The next day he went 3-for-4."

On June 11, 1961, Cash became the first Detroit Tiger to hit a home run ball out of Tiger Stadium, clearing the right field roof. Cash would hit the ball over the same right-field roof three more times in his career.

On June 27, 1963, he played an entire game at first base without a defensive chance, as the Minnesota Twins won 10–6.

On his own team, Cash was overshadowed by his future Hall-of-Fame roommate Al Kaline. While his batting average fell off sharply after 1961, Cash hit 30 or more homers four more times, and hit at least 20 in ten of the next eleven seasons. He was the only American League player to hit at least 20 home runs every season from 1961 to 1969. He also finished second in the league in home runs three times (behind Harmon Killebrew in 1962, Tony Conigliaro in 1965, and Bill Melton in 1971), with the Tigers finishing among the AL's top three scoring teams every year from 1961 through 1968.

Cash was also considered one of the better defensive first basemen of the 1960s, leading the league in putouts (1961), fielding percentage (1964, 1967) and assists (1965–67).

In a year marked by dominant pitching, Cash hit .263 with 25 home runs to help the Tigers to 103 wins and the AL pennant in 1968. In the 1968 World Series, he hit .385 (10-for-26) with one home run. With two out in the seventh inning of Game 7, Cash singled off Bob Gibson to start a three-run rally that broke a scoreless tie and propelled the team to its first title since 1945.

In his only other post-season appearance as a Tiger, Cash hit .267 in the five-game 1972 American League Championship Series against the Oakland Athletics. He hit a home run to give Detroit a 1–0 lead in Game 1, though the Tigers went on to lose the game and the series.

He was released by the Tigers in August 1974 after hitting .228 in 53 games.

=== Relationship with fans and players ===
Apart from his batting accomplishments, Cash was a favorite with his teammates, the media, and Tiger fans. He was known for his hard living and his sense of humor.

On July 15, 1973, as Nolan Ryan was working on his second career no-hitter, Cash went to the plate with two outs in the bottom of the ninth (after striking out his previous three at-bats), holding a table leg from the clubhouse instead of a regulation bat. The stunt drew immediate action by home plate umpire Ron Luciano, who ordered Cash to use a legal bat (though the announcers of the game reported that Luciano was amused by the attempt). Cash popped out using a regulation bat to end the game.

Teammate Jim Northrup told the story as follows: "In his last at-bat, Norm walked up to the plate with a table leg from the locker room. The plate umpire, Ron Luciano, says, `You can't use that up here.' Cash says, `Why not, I won't hit him anyway.' He then gets a bat, then hit a popup to shortstop to end the game. As he was walking away he says to Luciano, `See, I told ya.'"

"When you mention Norm Cash, I just smile", said Al Kaline, who had a locker adjacent to Cash's for years. "He was just a fun guy to be around and a great teammate. He always came ready to play."

Once Cash was trapped between first and second base about to be tagged out. He stopped in his tracks and formed a "T" with his hands to call time-out. There was also a time when Cash missed a foul ball in the stands, turned a little boy's cap around, stuck his hand into the young fan's popcorn box and said, "Thanks, kid", as the boy looked up in bewilderment.

One trick Cash frequently tried, occurred when play resumed after a rain delay, Northrup recalled. "If Norman was on second before the rain delay, he would go to third", Northrup said. "If he was on first, he would go to second." Northrup said: "Norm had more fun than anybody."

Cash was also noted for never wearing a batting helmet during his major league career, being one of the few veteran players who was permitted not to do so after helmets were mandated in 1971. Protective liners, however, were required to be worn inside their caps.

==== Career statistics ====
Cash was a career .271 hitter with 377 home runs, 1104 RBI, 1046 runs, 1820 hits, 241 doubles, 41 triples, 43 stolen bases, a .374 on-base percentage, and a .488 slugging average in 2089 games. He holds Tigers career defensive records at first base in games (1912), putouts (14,926), assists (1303), and double plays (1328), having broken the marks set by Hank Greenberg and Rudy York. He had a .992 fielding percentage at first base in his career. Cash is one of eight players in Tigers history (with Sam Crawford, Ty Cobb, Charlie Gehringer, Al Kaline, Lou Whitaker, Alan Trammell and Miguel Cabrera) to have played at least 2,000 regular season games with the team.

Cash summed up his success as follows: "I owe my success to expansion pitching, a short right-field fence, and my hollow bats." Later in his career, Cash claimed he used a corked bat in 1961, even showing Sports Illustrated how he made one.

=== Caribbean baseball ===
In between, Cash played winter ball with the Indios de Oriente club of the Venezuelan League during the 1958–59 season. As the league champions, the Indios represented Venezuela in the 1959 Caribbean Series, as Cash posted a .360 average (9-for-25) and led the tournament in home runs (2), RBI (11) and slugging (.680), while driving in six runs in a game — also a Series record — and earning MVP honors.

== Later life ==
After retiring from baseball, Cash signed with the Detroit Caesars, a professional softball team, and played two seasons (1977–1978). The Caesars played in the American Professional Slow Pitch Softball League (APSPL), winning league titles in both seasons with Cash. The team was owned by Mike Ilitch, who would later become the owner of the Detroit Tigers. The Caesars had extensive talent from the amateur softball leagues, and both Cash and fellow former Tiger Jim Northrup played part-time and promotional roles.

Cash was a color commentator for ABC's Monday Night Baseball in 1976, and for Tiger telecasts on ON-TV subscription television from 1980 to 1982.

In October 1986, Cash drowned in an accident off Beaver Island in northern Lake Michigan when he slipped off a dock and struck his head. His body was discovered about 11:00am in 15 feet (4.6 m) of water at Beaver Island. An autopsy later revealed that Cash had a blood alcohol content of 0.18 percent at the time of his death. He is buried in Pine Lake Cemetery, West Bloomfield, Michigan.

On April 23, 2005, the high school and Little League baseball field in Post, Texas were dedicated to Cash. He was inducted into the Texas Sports Hall of Fame in 2001.

== See also ==
- List of Major League Baseball career home run leaders
- List of Major League Baseball career runs scored leaders
- List of Major League Baseball career runs batted in leaders
- List of Major League Baseball batting champions
