= Dick Egan (pitcher) =

American baseball player (born 1937)

- Pitcher
- Born: March 24, 1937 (age 89); Berkeley, California, U.S.
- Batted: Left Threw: Left

MLB debut
- April 9, 1963, for the Detroit Tigers

Last MLB appearance
- September 4, 1967, for the Los Angeles Dodgers

MLB statistics
- Win–loss record: 1–2
- Earned run average: 5.15
- Strikeouts: 68
- Stats at Baseball Reference

Teams
- Detroit Tigers (1963–1964); California Angels (1966); Los Angeles Dodgers (1967)

Richard Wallis Egan (born March 24, 1937) is an American former professional baseball player who played four seasons for the Detroit Tigers, California Angels, and Los Angeles Dodgers of Major League Baseball.

After retiring from playing, Egan served as a special assistant to Detroit Tigers President, CEO, and General Manager Dave Dombrowski.
