= Jim Rivera =

American baseball player (1921–2017)

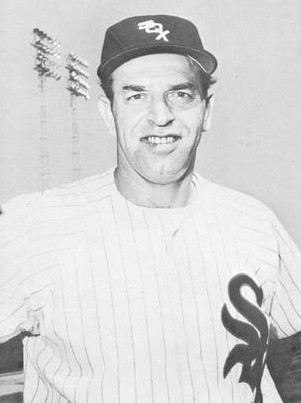
- Outfielder
- Born: July 22, 1921; New York City, U.S.
- Died: November 13, 2017 (aged 96); Fort Wayne, Indiana, U.S.
- Batted: Left Threw: Left

MLB debut
- April 15, 1952, for the St. Louis Browns

Last MLB appearance
- September 30, 1961, for the Kansas City Athletics

MLB statistics
- Batting average: .256
- Home runs: 83
- Runs batted in: 422
- Stolen bases: 160
- Stats at Baseball Reference

Teams
- St. Louis Browns (1952); Chicago White Sox (1952–1961); Kansas City Athletics (1961)

Career highlights and awards
- AL stolen base leader (1955)

Manuel Joseph "Jungle Jim" Rivera (July 22, 1921 – November 13, 2017) was an American professional baseball outfielder. In 1944, he was found guilty of attempted rape and sentenced to life in prison. He played baseball on the prison baseball team, and caught the attention of the Atlanta Crackers owner who worked to secure a parole for him. Rivera's sentence was later reduced, and after five years in the Atlanta Federal Penitentiary he was paroled in 1949, and upon his release he was signed by the Crackers. He played for three Major League Baseball (MLB) teams over ten seasons: the St. Louis Browns (1952), Chicago White Sox (1952–1961), and Kansas City Athletics (1961).

== Early life ==
Rivera was born to Puerto Rican immigrants in Brooklyn in New York City, and grew up in Spanish Harlem in Manhattan. When he was a boy, he aspired to be a priest. He was one of 12 siblings, and when his mother died when he was 6 years old, his father sent him to the Saint Dominic’s Orphanage, a Catholic orphanage north of New York City in Blauvelt, New York, on the upper Hudson River, where he lived for almost a decade. He attended high school at the orphanage.

He enlisted in the United States Army Air Corps in August 1942.

In 1944, Rivera was charged by the Army with raping and assaulting an Army officer's daughter while in the military, after a dance at Barksdale Field, Louisiana. After a medical exam of the accuser that indicated that she was still a virgin, his charge was reduced to attempted rape. He was found guilty of attempted rape, dishonorably discharged, and sentenced to life in prison. Rivera played baseball on the prison baseball team, and his success caught the attention of Atlanta Crackers owner Earl Mann, who worked to secure a parole for Rivera. Rivera's sentence was later reduced, and after five years in the Atlanta Federal Penitentiary he was paroled in 1949, and upon his release he was signed by the Crackers.

== Career ==
He was first called "Jim" when he was 17, "Big Jim" when he started playing for the Chicago White Sox during the 1952 season, and "Jungle Jim" in 1953 which was initiated by Chicago Sun-Times sports writer Edgar Munzel. This was due largely to his unorthodox playing style, and for his highly extroverted personality.

Rivera threw and batted left-handed; he stood 6 feet tall and weighed 196 pounds during his playing days. In 1949, playing for the Gainesville G-Men in the Florida State League, he batted .335 (3rd in the league)/.405/.537(2nd) in 529 at bats and led the league in runs (142), triples (16), and stolen bases (55), while coming in second in home runs (13) and RBIs (102), while on defense he played center field and had 24 assists.

In 1950, he played primarily for the Pensacola Fliers of the Southeastern League, for whom in 527 at bats he batted .338(9th in the league)/.388/.552(6th) and tied for the league lead in runs (139) and triples (12), while coming in third in RBIs (135), fifth in home runs (20), and sixth in stolen bases (23), while on defense he played outfield and had 13 assists. In 34 at bats for the Atlanta Crackers he batted .265.

In 1951 he played for the Seattle Rainiers of the Class AAA Pacific Coast League, and in 657 at bats batted .352(leading the league)/.420(second)/.553(leading the league and led the league in runs (135), doubles (40), triples (16), RBIs (112), stolen bases (33), and hit by pitch (10), while tying for second in home runs (20) and coming in third in walks (67), while on defense he played outfield and had 16 assists. He was the 1951 Pacific Coast League MVP.

He made his MLB debut at 30 years of age in 1952. In 1953, he led the American League in triples (16; he was in the top 7 in the league three other seasons), in 1955 in stolen bases with 25 (he was second in the league six other seasons), in stolen base percentage in 1957 and 1958 (he was in the top five in five other seasons), and in 1955 in outfield assists (22; he was fourth in the league in one other season), and was the sixth-oldest player in the league in 1961. He was a sparkplug for the 1950s Go-Go White Sox team, eventually winning the American League pennant in 1959. White Sox General Manager Ed Short said: "Jungle Jim may not have the fattest average in baseball, but he gives the fans a show with his daredevil running and sliding, his terrific fielding, and clutch hitting. He runs in the outfield like a deer, on the bases like an express train, and he throws like a rifle." On Opening Day in 1961 he asked U.S. President of the United States John F. Kennedy for his autograph, and after seeing the signature said,

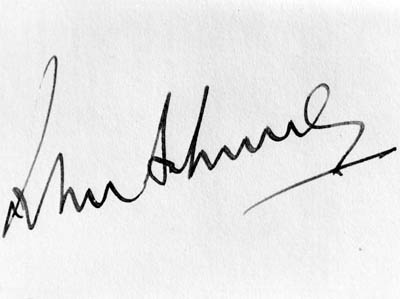
John F. Kennedy signature

"What kind of garbage college is that Harvard, where they don't even teach you how to write? What kind of garbage writing is this? What is this garbage autograph? Do you think I can go into any tavern on Chicago's south side and really say the President of the United States signed his baseball for me? I'd be run off."

A smart and fast runner, Rivera ran the bases with abandon, sliding into bases on his belly before it was fashionable, and made many a game-saving catch playing right field. A ground ball hitter, he used his speed to full advantage and was much tougher in clutch situations. However, in that year's World Series, which the White Sox lost in six games to the Los Angeles Dodgers, Rivera went hitless in 11 at-bats.

At age 40, Rivera appeared in 64 games for the Kansas City A's during the 1961 season, hitting .241 to cap his career. Rivera said Whitey Ford was the "toughest" pitcher he ever faced and he liked it when he was called "Big Jim."

Rivera had a .256 lifetime batting average with 83 home runs, 422 RBIs, 503 runs, 155 doubles, 56 triples, and 40 intentional walks with a 106 Power-Speed # and 70.5% stolen base percentage in 1,171 games played. He also had a career total of 160 stolen bases and a lifetime .978 fielding average. As of the beginning of the 2025 season, in Chicago White Sox history in his career he was 7th in Power-Speed #, tied for 14th in intentional walks, 17th in stolen-base percentage, 18th in stolen bases, and tied for 18th in triples. His 90.0% stolen base percentage in 1957 was 8th-best and his 87.5% in 1958 was 12th-best, and his16 triples in 1953 were tied for 11th-most, in single-season team history.

In 1962 he had 393 at bats in the minor leagues, batted .229/.354/.422, and stole 19 bases in 21 attempts, as he had 11 assists while playing the outfield.

== Later life ==
Rivera would go on to be a part-owner and manager for both the Fort Wayne Scouts (1979) and Fort Wayne Huggie Bears (1980) who played in two men's professional softball leagues. He was inducted into the Chicagoland Sports Hall of Fame.

Rivera died on November 13, 2017, at the age of 96.

== See also ==
- List of Chicago White Sox award winners and league leaders
- List of Major League Baseball annual triples leaders
- List of Major League Baseball annual stolen base leaders
- List of professional sportspeople convicted of crimes
