= Babe Birrer =

American baseball player (1929–2013)

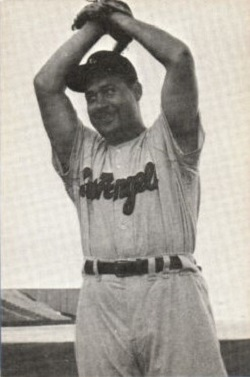
- Pitcher
- Born: July 4, 1929; Buffalo, New York, U.S.
- Died: November 19, 2013 (aged 84); Clarence, New York, U.S.
- Batted: Right Threw: Right

MLB debut
- June 5, 1955, for the Detroit Tigers

Last MLB appearance
- September 24, 1958, for the Los Angeles Dodgers

MLB statistics
- Win–loss record: 4–3
- Earned run average: 4.36
- Strikeouts: 45
- Stats at Baseball Reference

Teams
- Detroit Tigers (1955); Baltimore Orioles (1956); Los Angeles Dodgers (1958)

Werner Joseph Birrer (July 4, 1929 – November 19, 2013) was an American pitcher in Major League Baseball. Listed at 6' 0", 195 lb., Birrer batted and threw right handed. He was born in Buffalo, New York. Graduated from Kensington High School in Buffalo, New York (1947). Signed by Detroit Tigers Scout "Cy" Williams, not the ball player in 1947.

Birrer pitched for the Detroit Tigers, Baltimore Orioles and Los Angeles Dodgers in all or parts of three seasons spanning 1955–1958. He posted a combined record of 4–3 and a 4.36 earned run average (ERA) in 56 pitching appearances, including three starts, one complete game and four saves, giving up 39 runs (37 earned) on 129 hits and 29 base on balls, while striking out 28 in 119 2/3 innings of work.

His career highlight came on July 19, 1955, at Briggs Stadium, when he belted two three-run home runs off George Zuverink and Art Schallock, while pitching four scoreless innings in a 12–4 win over the Baltimore Orioles.

Besides, Birrer had a long time career in the minor leagues between 1947 and 1966, most prominently with the Buffalo Bisons of the International League. In an 18-year career, he compiled a 139–145 record and a 4.01 ERA in 518 games. In 1957, while pitching for Triple-A Los Angeles Angels, he hurled a no-hitter against his former team the Vancouver Mounties.

Birrer also gave five seasons of good service in the Venezuelan League, while pitching for four teams, and starring in the Caribbean Series.

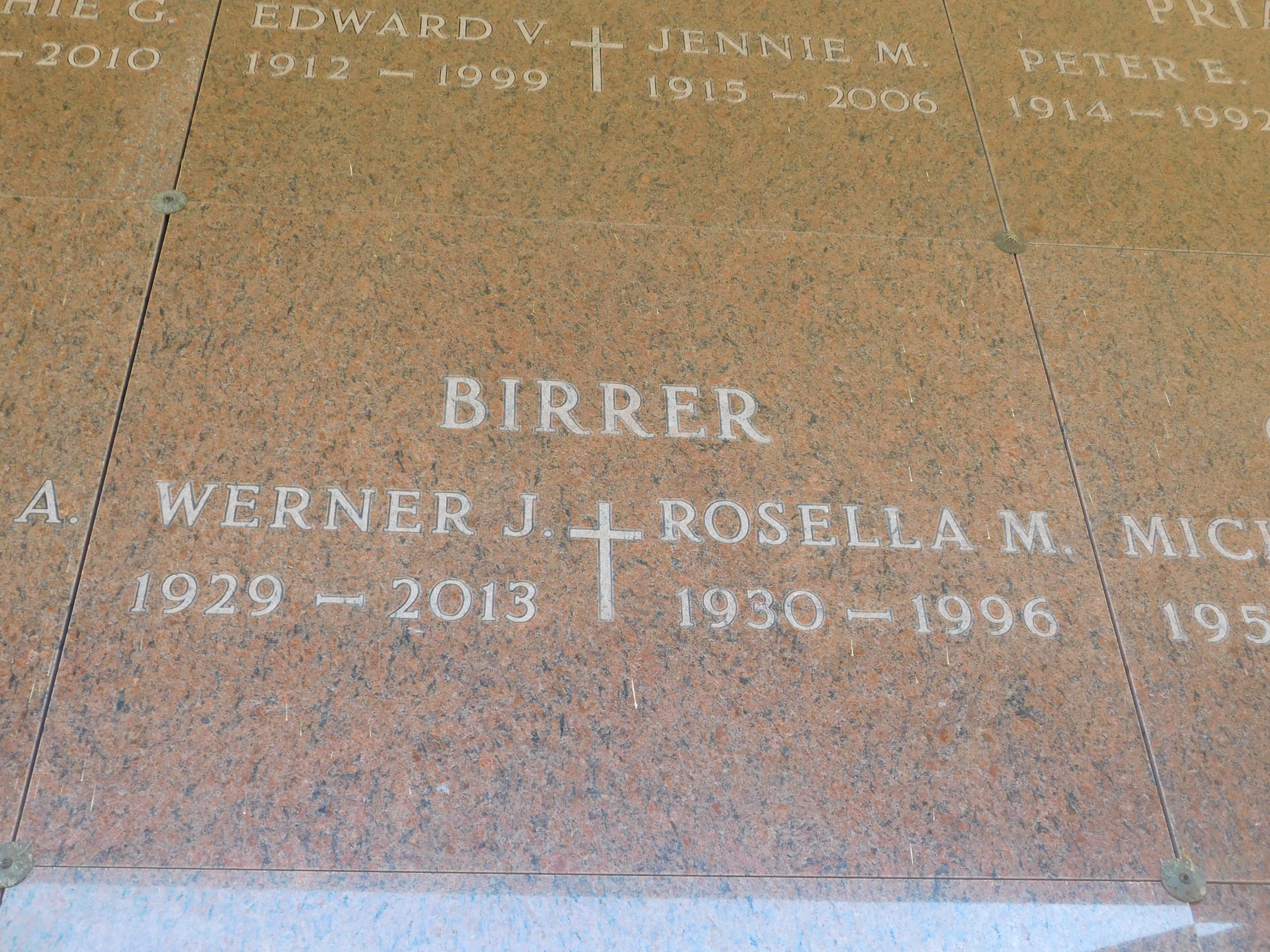
The grave of Birrer at Mount Calvary Cemetery in Cheektowaga, New York

He went 30–34 with a 2.87 ERA in 84 games, including 40 complete games, 114 walks, and 282 strikeouts in 566 2/3 innings. In addition, he posted the best ERA in the league during the 1959–1960 (1.89) and 1960–1961 (1.64) seasons.

Birrer then made the 1959 Caribbean Series All-Star team, after going 2–0 with a 1.25 ERA and 18 strikeouts in 21 2/3 innings, including a 13-inning victory. He also set a Series record with his 13 innings pitched in a single game, which still remain intact.

Birrer spent the last years of his life at a nursing home in Clarence, New York, where he died in 2013 at the age of 84.

== See also ==
- 1957 Caribbean Series
- 1959 Caribbean Series
