= Venezuelan Professional Baseball League =

Top-level professional baseball league in Venezuela

- Upcoming season or competition: 2026–27 LVBP season
- Sport: Baseball
- Founded: 27 December 1945; 80 years ago in Caracas
- No. of teams: 8
- Country: Venezuela
- Confederation: CPBC; WBSC Americas
- Continent: South America
- Most recent champion: Navegantes del Magallanes (14th title)
- Most titles: Leones del Caracas (21 titles)
- Related competitions: Caribbean Series
- Website: www.lvbp.com (in Spanish)

The Venezuelan Professional Baseball League (Spanish: Liga Venezolana de Béisbol Profesional, abbreviation; LVBP) is the top-level professional baseball league in Venezuela. The league's champion takes part in the Caribbean Series each year.

== History ==
=== Background and predecessors ===
Baseball had been played in Venezuela at the amateur level since the late 19th century, with the first national tournament played in Caracas in October 1917, between eight teams representing Caracas, La Guaira, Puerto Cabello, Macuto, and Maracay. Early clubs included Santa Marta (La Guaira), Venezuela and Magallanes (both of Caracas). A national baseball league (Spanish: Liga Nacional) was officially formed on June 26, 1927. In the 1930s, the league included Magallanes, Royal Criollo, and Concordia, the latter of which was sponsored by Gonzalo Gomez, brother of dictator Juan Vicente Gómez. Concordia attracted talent like Martín Dihigo as well as future Venezuelan stars including Alejandro Carrasquel and Luis Aparicio Sr.

The popularity of baseball exploded in Venezuela in 1941, following the world championship in Havana. By then, the appearance of professional baseball in Venezuela attracted many ball players from the Caribbean and the United States to the country, showing a more integrated sport there than it was in the United States. This is evidenced in the hiring of stellar players like Ramón Bragaña, Cocaína García, Oscar Estrada, Bertrum Hunter, Roy Campanella, Sam Jethroe, Satchel Paige, and Roy Welmaker.

=== Professionalization and early years (1946-64) ===
On December 27, 1945, the owners of Cervecería Caracas (Caracas Brewery), Sabios de Vargas (Vargas Wisemen), Navegantes del Magallanes (Magellan Navigators), and Patriotas de Venezuela (Venezuelan Patriots) created the Venezuelan Professional Baseball League. The league was formally registered as an institution during January 1946, and in the same month organized its first tournament, starting on January 3, 1946. Sabios de Vargas, led by Daniel 'Chino' Canónico, became the first champion, with a record of 18 wins and 12 losses.

During the first tournaments, games were played on Thursdays and Saturdays on the afternoons, and Sundays in the morning. This was the norm until the Estadio Cerveza Caracas ballpark — located in the San Agustín del Norte zone of Caracas — was fitted with electric lights, enabling its use during night games. Thus, a game was added on Tuesday nights.

Eventually, the tournament was changed to accommodate two rounds, with the top team of each round having a best-of-5 play-off to determine the champion.

On August 8, 1952, Pablo Morales and Oscar Prieto Ortiz purchased the Cervecería Caracas team from Martín Tovar Lange, as the Caracas Brewery Co. was unable to continue sponsoring the team and it had the highest payroll of the league. The new owners renamed the team as Leones del Caracas (Caracas Lions), after the full name of the city, Santiago de Leon de Caracas. On October 17, 1952, the 1952-1953 season of the league started, with the first game of Leones del Caracas vs. Venezuela BBC. Leones del Caracas ended their season as champions for the first time.

The next season, alongside the start of limited television coverage of the league, would see the departure of the teams Sabios de Vargas and Venezuela BBC due to economic problems, being replaced by two teams (Gavilanes and Pastora) from the professional league of the Zulia State, from western Venezuela.

In 1954 Sabios de Vargas was replaced by Santa Marta and Patriotas de Venezuela came back both only for that year.

In 1955 a new team was added in the place of the departed Venezuela, named Pampero; while the Santa Marta BBC was moved out of Caracas, and renamed to Industriales de Valencia (Valencia Industrymen).

The 1956-1957 tournament would see further changes: the Navegantes del Magallanes team was purchased by advertisers Joe Novas and Joe Cruz and renamed as Oriente, leaving the league made of Leones del Caracas, Oriente, Pampero and Industriales de Valencia.

In 1962, Los Tiburones de La Guaira (La Guaira Sharks) were brought into the league to replace Pampero.

=== Expansion (1965-1989) ===
In 1965, the league expanded from 4 to 6 teams, with the addition of the teams Cardenales de Lara and Tigres de Aragua.

For the 1968-1969 tournament, the Industrymen left the city of Valencia and relocated to Acarigua with a new name: Los Llaneros. This left Valencia without a team, prompting the move of Navegantes del Magallanes from Caracas to Valencia, and their return to their original name for the 1969-1970 tournament. In 1969, Las Águilas del Zulia (Zulia Eagles) joined the VPBL to replace Industriales de Valencia.

The 1970s saw the first successes for Venezuelan teams outside of Venezuela since the amateur championships of the 1940s, with the Navegantes del Magallanes winning two Caribbean Series. It also saw problems for the league, in the form of the strike that prevented the 1973-1974 tournament, and the problems the Leones del Caracas and Tiburones de La Guaira had in 1975–1976 to secure a baseball park to play their home games. This resulted in both teams merged into one, and forced to move to the city of Acarigua.

Also in the 1970s, Tigres de Aragua won the first championships for the 1960s expansion teams.

The 1980s saw the Leones del Caracas winning five tournaments, consolidating their lead as the most successful team in the league. Leones del Caracas also went on to win three championships in a row starting in the 1979–80 season, and their first Caribbean Series in 1982. The decade also saw success for the Tiburones de La Guaira, with the team winning 3 championships.

Also in the 1980s, the Águilas del Zulia won their first two championships, all the way to also winning their first two Caribbean Series in 1984 and 1989.

=== 1990s and 2000s ===
In 1991, the league expanded from six to eight teams, with the addition of the Caribes de Oriente (Eastern Caribbeans), who are now the Caribes de Anzoátegui (Anzoátegui Caribbeans); and the Petroleros de Cabimas (Cabimas Oilers), who became Pastora de los Llanos (Llanos Shepherds), and from the 2007–08 season on, Bravos de Margarita (Margarita Braves). This led to a change in format, with the eight teams being organized in two divisions: the Eastern Division (División Oriental) with the teams Caracas, Magallanes, La Guaira and Oriente; and the Western Division (División Occidental) with the teams Zulia, Lara, Aragua and Cabimas. The first two teams from each division by the end of the regular season of the tournament would qualify to the round-robin semifinals.

The format would change again some years later, with the addition of a wildcard team in the semifinals: the best placed third-place from the two divisions would accompany the other four teams in a round-robin semifinal.

For the 2007–08 season, with the move of the Pastora team from the western city of Acarigua to the eastern city of Porlamar, the Western Division and the Eastern Division were merged into a single division of eight teams, with the top five teams advancing to the semifinals.

The 2015–2016 season saw a new change in format, with a regular season divided in two rounds, which ranked the teams by their record and assigned points depending on their position in the table at the end of each round. The total points from both rounds are added at the end of the regular season, and the teams are then ranked by points. Also part of the format change was the introduction of a sixth team qualified for the semifinals, and the change of the semifinal from a round robin format to two phases of play-offs to the best of 7 games.

In recent years, Tigres de Aragua has become the most dominant team of the league, winning the crown seven times in the last fifteen years, including three times in a row from the 2006-07 season to the 2008-09 season and also winning the Caribbean Series in 2009.

On August 22, 2019, Major League Baseball banned its affiliated players from playing in the Venezuelan League to comply with President Donald Trump's embargo on Venezuela. This ban was later limited to only Navegantes del Magallanes and Tigres de Aragua, and has since been lifted for all clubs.

As of 2023, the LVBP has a limit of maximum five foreign players (known as imports) per team.

== All Star Game ==
The league has scheduled All Star Games most years, sometimes featuring Criollos (Venezuelans) vs Importados (foreigners), Western Division vs Eastern Division or Stars vs "Stars of the Future," and even a Venezuela's League Stars vs. Dominican Republic's League Stars inter-league all star game during the 2007-2008 and 2011-2012 tournaments.

== Current teams ==
Team	City	Stadium	Capacity	Founded	Joined	Ref.
Águilas del Zulia	Maracaibo, Zulia	Estadio Luis Aparicio El Grande	24,000	1969		
Bravos de Margarita	Porlamar, Nueva Esparta	Stadium Nueva Esparta	18,000	2007		
Cardenales de Lara	Barquisimeto, Lara	Estadio Antonio Herrera Gutiérrez	20,450	1942	1965	
Caribes de Anzoátegui	Puerto La Cruz, Anzoátegui	Estadio Alfonso Chico Carrasquel	18,000	1987	1991	
Leones del Caracas	Caracas, D.C.	Estadio Monumental de Caracas Simón Bolívar	38,000	1942	1946	
Navegantes del Magallanes	Valencia, Carabobo	Estadio José Bernardo Pérez	16,000	1917	1946	
Tiburones de La Guaira	Macuto, La Guaira	Estadio Fórum La Guaira	14,300	1962		
Tigres de Aragua	Maracay, Aragua	Estadio José Pérez Colmenares	12,647	1965		

Venezuelan Professional Baseball League team locations

=== Defunct teams ===
- Sabios de Vargas (1946–1953)
- Patriotas de Venezuela (1946–1955)
- Gavilanes de Maracaibo (1953–54 season)
- Lácteos de Pastora (1953–54, 1995–1997)
- Santa Marta de La Guaira (1954–55 season)
- Industriales de Valencia (1955–1968)
- Licoreros de Pampero (1955–1962)
- Indios de Oriente / Estrellas Orientales (1956–1964)
- Llaneros de Acarigua (1968–69 season)
- Llaneros de Portuguesa (1975–76 season)
- Pastora de los Llanos (1997–2007)
- Petroleros de Cabimas (1991–1995)

== Format ==
The league houses eight teams in two divisions, the Occidental (Western) and the Central divisions. The tournament is divided into a regular season and a postseason consisting of a semi-final and final round.

=== Regular season ===
The regular season follows a round robin format where a total of 63 games are disputed by each of the eight teams that made up the Venezuelan Professional Baseball League, meaning that each team faces every other team a total of 9 times, 5 times as home club and 4 times as away team; the number of games as home club between any 2 clubs alternates year by year.

At the end of the regular season, the teams are ranked from first place to last in their division depending on their win–loss record, and the first 2 teams in each division qualify.

In the case of a tie between qualified teams, their position on the table is determined by the following criteria:

- The team who won the most games in the head-to-head games between the tied teams.
- The difference between runs scored and runs received will be used to break the tie if it persists.
- A drawing of lots will be used if the tie persists.

In the case of a tie between teams where a position in the postseason needs to be determined, the tie will be solved with extra games.

Division Occidental	Division Central
Cardenales de Lara	Caribes de Anzoátegui
Navegantes del Magallanes	Tigres de Aragua
Bravos de Margarita	Leones del Caracas
Aguilas del Zulia	Tiburones de La Guaira

=== Postseason ===
The postseason consists of a semi-final and final round. All the series are playoff series to the best of 7 games. In all of these single elimination series, the team with better standing during the regular season has home advantage, playing the first two games as home club, then two games away, and if necessary, the fifth game is away and the last two games as home club.

==== Semifinal round ====
The semifinal round consists of two series in a best-of-seven format. The first team in one division faces the second team in the other division.

There are rest days in both series after the second and fifth games.

==== Final ====
The play-off final is a series in a best-of-seven-format between the winners of the semifinal-series. The winner of this series goes on to play is the Caribbean Series.

== Past champions ==
Key
†	Champions also won the Caribbean Series that season
†	Champions also won the Interamerican Series / Serie de las Américas that season

Season	Champion	Record	Final Series	Runners up	Manager
1946	Sabios de Vargas	18-12	–	Cervecería Caracas	Daniel Canónico
1946–47	Sabios de Vargas (2)	17-19	–	Cervecería Caracas	Ernesto Aparicio
1947–48	Cervecería Caracas	25-14	–	Sabios de Vargas	José Antonio Casanova
1948–49	Cervecería Caracas (2)	18-13	–	Navegantes del Magallanes	José Antonio Casanova
1949–50	Navegantes del Magallanes	32-14	–	Cervecería Caracas	Lázaro Salazar
1950–51	Navegantes del Magallanes (2)	34-19	–	Cervecería Caracas	Lázaro Salazar
1951–52	Cervecería Caracas (3)	41-15	–	Navegantes del Magallanes	José Antonio Casanova
1952–53	Leones del Caracas (4)	32-35	–	Navegantes del Magallanes	Martín Dihigo
1953–54	Lácteos de Pastora	48-30	–	Navegantes del Magallanes	Buster Mills
1954–55	Navegantes del Magallanes (3)	32-18	–	Leones del Caracas	Lázaro Salazar
1955–56	Industriales de Valencia	33-21	4–1	Licoreros de Pampero	Clay Bryant
1956–57	Leones del Caracas (5)	26-26	–	Industriales de Valencia	Clay Bryant
1957–58	Industriales de Valencia (2)	23-18	–	Rapiños de Occidente	Regino Otero
1958–59	Industriales de Valencia (3)	28-18	–	Rapiños de Occidente	Regino Otero
1959–60 season suspended due to a players' strike
1960–61	Industriales de Valencia (4) ^{†}	30-22	3–2	Indios de Oriente	Rodolfo Fernández
1961–62	Leones del Caracas (6)	31-21	4–1	Indios de Oriente	Regino Otero
1962–63	Industriales de Valencia (5)	23-16	4–3	Leones del Caracas	Robert Hoffman
1963–64	Leones del Caracas (7)	26-24	4–3	Industriales de Valencia	Regino Otero
1964–65	Tiburones de La Guaira	28-22	4–1	Leones del Caracas	José Antonio Casanova
1965–66	Tiburones de La Guaira (2)	37-23	3–2	Industriales de Valencia	Tony Pacheco
1966–67	Leones del Caracas (8)	32-29	3–2	Tiburones de La Guaira	Regino Otero
1967–68	Leones del Caracas (9)	37-23	–	Tigres de Aragua	Regino Otero
1968–69	Tiburones de La Guaira (3)	36-24	–	Tigres de Aragua	Wilfredo Calviño
1969–70	Navegantes del Magallanes (4) ^{†}	32-28	3–0	Tiburones de La Guaira	Carlos Pascual
1970–71	Tiburones de La Guaira (4)	31-29	4–3	Navegantes del Magallanes	Graciano Ravelo
1971–72	Tigres de Aragua	32-28	4–3	Tiburones de La Guaira	Rod Carew
1972–73	Leones del Caracas (10)	37-33	4–1	Águilas del Zulia	Ozzie Virgil Sr.
1973–74 season suspended due to a player's strike
1974–75	Tigres de Aragua (2)	32-28	4–2	Navegantes del Magallanes	Ozzie Virgil Sr.
1975–76	Tigres de Aragua (3)	31-33	4–3	Cardenales de Lara	Ozzie Virgil Sr.
1976–77	Navegantes del Magallanes (5)	35-30	4–2	Tiburones de La Guaira	Don Leppert
1977–78	Leones del Caracas (11)	40-30	4–3	Águilas del Zulia	Felipe Rojas Alou
1978–79	Navegantes del Magallanes (6) ^{†}	39-31	4–1	Águilas del Zulia	Willie Horton
1979–80	Leones del Caracas (12)	46-23	4–1	Cardenales de Lara	Felipe Rojas Alou
1980–81	Leones del Caracas (13)	33-27	4–0	Cardenales de Lara	Alfonso Carrasquel
1981–82	Leones del Caracas (14) ^{†}	38-27	4–1	Cardenales de Lara	Alfonso Carrasquel
1982–83	Tiburones de La Guaira (5)	34-31	4–1	Leones del Caracas	Ozzie Virgil Sr.
1983–84	Águilas del Zulia ^{†}	40-25	4–1	Cardenales de Lara	Rubén Amaro Sr.
1984–85	Tiburones de La Guaira (6)	35-29	4–0	Tigres de Aragua	Aurelio Monteagudo
1985–86	Tiburones de La Guaira (7)	32-33	4–3	Leones del Caracas	José Martínez
1986–87	Leones del Caracas (15)	33-31	4–0	Tiburones de La Guaira	Bill Plummer
1987–88	Leones del Caracas (16)	33-27	4–2	Tigres de Aragua	Bill Robinson
1988–89	Águilas del Zulia (2) ^{†}	35-25	4–3	Tigres de Aragua	Pete Mackanin
1989–90	Leones del Caracas (17)	32-28	4–3	Cardenales de Lara	Phil Regan
1990–91	Cardenales de Lara	37-23	4–2	Leones del Caracas	Domingo Carrasquel
1991–92	Águilas del Zulia (3)	38-22	4–3	Tigres de Aragua	Pompeyo Davalillo
1992–93	Águilas del Zulia (4)	32-28	4–0	Navegantes del Magallanes	Pompeyo Davalillo
1993–94	Navegantes del Magallanes (7)	35-25	4–3	Leones del Caracas	Tim Tolman
1994–95	Leones del Caracas (18)	33-27	4–2	Águilas del Zulia	Pompeyo Davalillo
1995–96	Navegantes del Magallanes (8)	29-31	4–3	Cardenales de Lara	Gregorio Machado
1996–97	Navegantes del Magallanes (9)	33-17	4–1	Leones del Caracas	John Tamargo
1997–98	Cardenales de Lara (2)	43-21	4–3	Leones del Caracas	Omar Malavé
1998–99	Cardenales de Lara (3)	35-26	4–3	Leones del Caracas	Omar Malavé
1999–00	Águilas del Zulia (5)	35-27	4–1	Navegantes del Magallanes	Marc Bombard
2000–01	Cardenales de Lara (4)	38-24	4–2	Navegantes del Magallanes	Nick Leyva
2001–02	Navegantes del Magallanes (10)	30-32	4–1	Tigres de Aragua	Phil Regan
2002–03 season cancelled due to a nationwide general strike
2003–04	Tigres de Aragua (4)	34-28	4–2	Caribes de Anzoátegui	Buddy Bailey
2004–05	Tigres de Aragua (5)	31-31	4–3	Leones del Caracas	Buddy Bailey
2005–06	Leones del Caracas (19) ^{†}	35-27	4–1	Tigres de Aragua	Carlos Subero
2006–07	Tigres de Aragua (6)	41-21	4–1	Navegantes del Magallanes	Buddy Bailey
2007–08	Tigres de Aragua (7)	32-31	4–1	Cardenales de Lara	Buddy Bailey
2008–09	Tigres de Aragua (8) ^{†}	36-27	4–3	Leones del Caracas	Buddy Bailey
2009–10	Leones del Caracas (20)	41-22	4–3	Navegantes del Magallanes	Dave Hudgens
2010–11	Caribes de Anzoátegui	34-29	4–3	Tigres de Aragua	Julio Franco
2011–12	Tigres de Aragua (9)	31-30	4–2	Tiburones de La Guaira	Buddy Bailey
2012–13	Navegantes del Magallanes (11)	36-27	4–3	Cardenales de Lara	Luis Sojo
2013–14	Navegantes del Magallanes (12)	33-30	4–1	Caribes de Anzoátegui	Carlos García
2014–15	Caribes de Anzoátegui (2)	39-24	4–1	Navegantes del Magallanes	Omar López
2015–16	Tigres de Aragua (9)	31-32	4–2	Navegantes del Magallanes	Eddie Perez
2016–17	Águilas del Zulia (6)	33-30	4–1	Cardenales de Lara	Lipso Nava
2017–18	Caribes de Anzoátegui (3)	32-31	4–2	Cardenales de Lara	Omar López
2018–19	Cardenales de Lara (5)	35-28	4–1	Leones del Caracas	José Moreno
2019–20	Cardenales de Lara (6)	24-18	4–3	Caribes de Anzoátegui	Luis Ugueto
2020–21	Caribes de Anzoátegui (4)	24-16	4–0	Cardenales de Lara	Mike Alvarez
2021–22	Navegantes del Magallanes (13)	32-17	4–3	Caribes de Anzoátegui	Willie Romero
2022–23	Leones del Caracas (21)	36-19	4–2	Tiburones de La Guaira	José Alguacil
2023–24	Tiburones de La Guaira (8) ^{†}	30-26	4–1	Cardenales de Lara	Ozzie Guillén
2024–25	Cardenales de Lara (7)	33-23	4–2	Bravos de Margarita	Henry Blanco
2025–26	Navegantes del Magallanes (14)	29-27	4–2	Caribes de Anzoátegui	Yadier Molina

=== Championships per team ===
Team	Years	Total
Leones del Caracas	1947-48, (Note: The team changed owners and name in 1952, but documents made public on October 4, 2011, state that the franchise official name - Caracas Baseball Club - remained constant during all sale transactions in 1949, 1952 and 2001. This has resulted in a change on the historical stats of Leones del Caracas, as reflected in the official page of the league.) 1948-49, 1951-52, 1952–53, 1956–57, 1961–62, 1963–64, 1966–67, 1967–68, 1972–73, 1977–78, 1979–80, 1980–81, 1981–82, 1986–87, 1987–88, 1989–90, 1994–95, 2005–06, 2009–10, 2022-23	21
Navegantes del Magallanes	1949–50, 1950–51, 1954–55, 1969–70, 1976–77, 1978–79, 1993–94, 1995–96, 1996–97, 2001–02, 2012-2013, 2013–14, 2021–22, 2025–26	14
Tigres de Aragua	1971–72, 1974–75, 1975–76, 2003–04, 2004–05, 2006–07, 2007–08, 2008–09, 2011–12, 2015–16	10
Tiburones de La Guaira	1964–65, 1965–66, 1968–69, 1970–71, 1982–83, 1984–85, 1985–86, 2023–24	8
Cardenales de Lara	1990–91, 1997–98, 1998–99, 2000–01, 2018–19, 2019–20, 2024–25	7
Águilas del Zulia	1983–84, 1988–89, 1991–92, 1992–93, 1999–00, 2016–17	6
Industriales de Valencia (Note: The team moved to a different city, and changed its name in 1968. The team disappeared by 1969, and was replaced with a new franchise.)	1955–56, 1957–58, 1958–59, 1960–61, 1962–63	5
Caribes de Anzoátegui	2010–11, 2014–15, 2017–18, 2020–21	4
Sabios de Vargas (Note: The team folded at the end of the 1952–53 season, and was replaced with a new franchise.)	1946, 1946–47	2
Lácteos de Pastora (Note: Played only in a National Championship Series called El Rotatorio.)	1953–54	1

== International titles ==
=== Caribbean Series ===
The Venezuelan champion moves on to the Caribbean Series to face the champions of the baseball leagues of the Dominican Republic, Puerto Rico, Mexico, Panama and Colombia. Venezuelan teams have won the Caribbean Series eight times, most recently in 2024 by the Tiburones de La Guaira, after having won the LVBP title during the 2023–24 season.

Team	Series Championship	Series Appearances	Championship years
Navegantes del Magallanes	2	13	1970, 1979
Águilas del Zulia	2	6	1984, 1989
Leones del Caracas	2	16	1982, 2006
Tigres de Aragua	1	10	2009
Tiburones de La Guaira	1	5	2024

=== Other competitions ===
The LVBP participated and hosted in the 2026 Serie de las Américas, after the 2026 Caribbean Series was relocated out of Venezuela; Navegantes del Magallanes won the tournament, adding a third international title to its franchise history.

== Individual honors ==
=== Most Valuable Player ===
The most valuable player award in Venezuela, officially the Víctor Davalillo Award (named after Víctor Davalillo, who enjoyed a three-decade playing career in the league) has been awarded since 1985.

Season	Player	Team	Pos.
1985-86	(Venezuela) Andrés Galarraga	Leones del Caracas	1B
1986-87	(United States) Cecil Fielder	Cardenales de Lara	1B
1987-88	(Venezuela) Luis Salazar	Tiburones de La Guaira	IF
1988-89	(United States) Phil Stephenson	Águilas del Zulia	1B
1989-90	(Venezuela) Luis Sojo	Cardenales de Lara	2B
1990-91	(United States) Greg Briley	Leones del Caracas	OF
1991-92	(United States) Chad Curtis	Tiburones de La Guaira	OF
1992-93	(Venezuela) William Cañate	Cardenales de Lara	OF
1993-94	(Venezuela) Luis Sojo	Cardenales de Lara	2B
1994-95	(Venezuela) Eduardo Pérez	Tigres de Aragua	C
1995-96	(Venezuela) Robert Pérez	Cardenales de Lara	OF
1996-97	(Venezuela) Magglio Ordóñez	Caribes de Oriente	OF
1997-98	(Venezuela) Alex Cabrera	Pastora de Los Llanos	1B
1998-99	(Venezuela) Luis Raven	Pastora de Los Llanos	DH
1999-00	(Venezuela) Roberto Zambrano	Tigres de Aragua	OF
2000-01	(United States) Chris Jones	Tiburones de La Guaira	OF
2001-02	(Venezuela) Roberto Zambrano (2)	Tigres de Aragua	OF
2002-03	Not awarded		
2003-04	(Venezuela) Luis Landaeta	Pastora de Los Llanos	OF
2004-05	(Venezuela) Javier Colina	Pastora de Los Llanos	3B
2005-06	(United States) Tom Evans	Cardenales de Lara	3B
2006-07	(Venezuela) Robert Pérez	Cardenales de Lara	OF
2007-08	(Venezuela) Eliezer Alfonzo	Caribes de Anzoátegui	C
2008-09	(Venezuela) Jesús Guzmán	Leones del Caracas	3B
2009-10	(Venezuela) Ernesto Mejía	Águilas del Zulia	1B
2010-11	(United States) Josh Kroeger	Leones del Caracas	OF
2011-12	(Venezuela) Gregor Blanco	Tiburones de La Guaira	OF
2012-13	(Venezuela) Ernesto Mejía (2)	Águilas del Zulia	1B
2013-14	(Venezuela) Alex Cabrera	Tiburones de La Guaira	1B
2014-15	(Venezuela) Odúbel Herrera	Tiburones de La Guaira	2B
2015-16	(Venezuela) Alex Cabrera (2)	Tiburones de La Guaira	1B
2016-17	(Venezuela) Breyvic Valera	Bravos de Margarita	2B
2017-18	(Dominican Republic) ~~Jesús Valdez~~ (rescinded)	~~Navegantes del Magallanes~~	~~OF~~
2018-19	(United States) Delmon Young	Navegantes del Magallanes	OF
2019-20	(Dominican Republic) Olmo Rosario	Águilas del Zulia	2B
2020-21	(Venezuela) Hernán Pérez	Tigres de Aragua	3B
2021-22	(Venezuela) Balbino Fuenmayor	Caribes de Anzoátegui	1B
2022-23	(Venezuela) Freddy Fermín	Leones del Caracas	C
2023-24	(Venezuela) Cafecito Martínez	Tigres de Aragua	OF
2024-25	(Venezuela) Renato Nuñez	Navegantes del Magallanes	1B
2025-26	(Venezuela) Balbino Fuenmayor (2)	Caribes de Anzoátegui	1B

== See also ==
- Baseball in Venezuela
- Liga Occidental de Béisbol Profesional
- Players from Venezuela in MLB
- Venezuela baseball awards
- Arturo J. Marcano Guevara (author)
- Liga Paralela de Béisbol en Venezuela
- Venezuelan Summer League

== Bibliography ==
- Javier González; Carlos Figueroa Ruiz. Campos de Gloria: El beisbol en Venezuela, 127 años de historia 1895-2022 (PDF) (in Spanish). Biblioteca Digital Banesco.
