= Liga Paralela de Béisbol en Venezuela =

Baseball league competition held in Venezuela

- Sport: Baseball
- Country: Venezuela

Liga Paralela de Béisbol (translated: Parallel Baseball League) is a baseball league competition held in Venezuela during the winter. Its relationship to the Venezuelan Professional Baseball League is similar to that of the AA and AAA Minor League Baseball leagues to Major League Baseball in the U.S.A. After players finish the league competition, they often join the MLB. It gives some of the younger Venezuelan players an opportunity to play in their home country during the winter.

Many player who join the league during the international signing period have not played in the Dominican Summer League or the Venezuelan Summer League, thus the Liga Paralela can provide a first glimpse at some of the year's top Venezuelan signings. International scouts say the quality of the league has improved over the last few years and has become an indicator of whether players are ready to make the leap to a rookie league in the United States.

This winter league is organized by the same organization that runs the Venezuelan Summer League.

== Teams ==
| Team | MLB affiliation | VPBL affiliation |
|---|---|---|
| Aragua | - | Tigres de Aragua |
| Boston | Boston Red Sox | Bravos de Margarita |
| Bravos | - | Bravos de Margarita |
| Caimanes | Chicago Cubs | Leones del Caracas |
| Caracas | - | Leones del Caracas |
| Caribes | - | Caribes de Anzoátegui |
| Detroit | Detroit Tigers | - |
| La Guaira | - | Tiburones de la Guaira |
| Lara | - | Cardenales de Lara |
| Magallanes | - | Navegantes del Magallanes |
| Navegantes | - | Navegantes del Magallanes |
| Phillies | Philadelphia Phillies | - |
| Seattle | Seattle Mariners | - |
| Tampa Bay | Tampa Bay Rays | - |
| Zulia | - | Águilas del Zulia |
