= 2009–10 Venezuelan Professional Baseball League season =

The 2009–10 Venezuelan Professional Baseball League season (Spanish: Liga Venezolana de Béisbol Profesional or LVBP) was contested in two round robin league phases and a playoff final.

== First league phase ==
This round is called "Ronda Eliminatoria" or "Regular" by the league.
It was played from 9 October to 26 December.

Team	Wins	Losses	Pct	GB
Navegantes del Magallanes	41	22	.651	–
Leones del Caracas	41	22	.651	–
Tiburones de La Guaira	32	31	.508	9
Bravos de Margarita	30	33	.476	11
Aguilas del Zulia(*)	29	34	.460	12
Cardenales de Lara(*)	29	34	.460	12
Tigres de Aragua	28	35	.444	13
Caribes de Anzoátegui	22	41	.349	19

The first 5 teams advanced to the second league phase.

(*)Zulia and Lara played an extra, tie-breaking game on 26 December 2009 in Maracaibo's "Luis Aparicio El Grande" stadium, with victory for the local Aguilas del Zulia with a 3–2 score.

== Second league phase ==
This round is called "Round Robin" or "Semi-final" by the league.
It was played from 28 December to 19 January.

Team	Wins	Losses	Pct	GB
Navegantes del Magallanes	11	5	.688	–
Leones del Caracas	10	6	.625	1
Tiburones de la Guaira	7	9	.438	4
Aguilas del Zulia	7	9	.438	4
Bravos de Margarita	5	11	.313	6

The top two teams classified to the championship series.

== Championship series ==
Team	Wins	Losses	Pct	GB
Leones del Caracas	4	3	.571	–
Navegantes del Magallanes	3	4	.429	1

Games:

Date	Stadium	City	Score	Series progression
21 January 2010	José Bernardo Pérez	Valencia	Caracas 0 – Magallanes 9	Magallanes leads 1-0
22 January 2010	José Bernardo Pérez	Valencia	Caracas 10 – Magallanes 12	Magallanes leads 2-0
24 January 2010	Universitario	Caracas	Magallanes 3 – Caracas 5	Magallanes leads 2-1
25 January 2010	Universitario	Caracas	Magallanes 7 – Caracas 10 (*)	2-2 tie
26 January 2010	Universitario	Caracas	Magallanes 3 – Caracas 0	Magallanes leads 3-2
28 January 2010	José Bernardo Pérez	Valencia	Caracas 6 – Magallanes 3	3-3 tie
29 January 2010	José Bernardo Pérez	Valencia	Caracas 7 – Magallanes 2	Caracas wins series 4-3

(*) Game decided on extra-innings. Inning 10.

The Leones del Caracas were crowned LVBP 2009-2010 Champions.
In the 2010 Caribbean Series they went 1-5 and finished 4th.

== Awards ==
Most Valuable Player (Víctor Davalillo Award): Ernesto Mejía (Zulia)

Overall Offensive Performer of the year: Tom Evans (Lara)

Rookie of the year: Ernesto Mejía (Zulia)

Comeback of the year: Tom Evans (Lara)

Manager of the year (Chico Carrasquel Award): Carlos García (Magallanes)

Pitcher of the year (Carrao Bracho Award): Jean Machi (Magallanes)

Closer of the year: Jean Machi (Magallanes)

Setup of the year: Elio Serrano (La Guaira)

70th LVBP Anniversary (Alejandro Carrasquel Trophy): Orber Moreno (Caracas)

== Highlights ==
Leones del Caracas won their 17th championship, and their first final against Navegantes del Magallanes.
