= 1982 Caribbean Series =

1982 baseball tournament

After a year of absence, the twenty-fourth edition of Baseball's Caribbean Series (12th edition of the second stage) finally took place in 1982. It was held from February 4 through February 9 with the champions teams from Dominican Republic, Leones del Escogido; Mexico, Naranjeros de Hermosillo; Puerto Rico, Leones de Ponce and Venezuela, Leones del Caracas. The format consisted of 12 games, each team facing the other teams twice. The games were played at Héctor Espino Stadium in Hermosillo, Mexico, which boosted capacity to 16.000 seats.

== Summary ==
The Venezuelan team, with Alfonso (Chico) Carrasquel at the helm, won the championship title with a 5–1 record. The Leones del Caracas were led by catcher and Series MVP Baudilio (Bo) Díaz (.412 BA, two home runs, five RBI, .500 OBP, .765 SLG), center fielder Tony Armas (.375, six RBI) and LF Luis Salazar (six runs, four stolen bases). Their best pitcher was Luis Leal, who posted a 2–0 record with a 2.08 ERA and 10 strikeouts in 13.0 innings of work. Behind him were Bud Black (1-0, 1.29), Dennis Burtt (1-0, one save, seven SO in 10 2/3 innings) and Tom Dixon (nine scoreless innings in Game 7). Venezuela also featured infielders Andrés Galarraga (1B), Danny Garcia (1B), Steve Sax (2B), Ron Gardenhire (SS) and Leonardo Hernández (3B), as well as pitchers Joe Cowley and Luis Peñalver, among others.

Puerto Rico was managed by Ed Nottle and ended second with a 3–3 mark. Ponce had no undefeated starters other than Edwin Núñez, who handed the Venezuelans only defeat, pitching a six-hit, one run complete game. Willie Hernández (1-1) and John Butcher (1-1) collected the other two wins. Other roster members included 2B Dickie Thon and outfielders Chili Davis, José Cruz and Candy Maldonado.

The highly favored Leones del Escogido, who won their second consecutive Dominican League title (eight since 1951), posted a disappointing record of 2-4--good enough to tie Mexico in third place. Despite Felipe Alou's best efforts at managing them, the Dominicans suffered both offensively and defensively, committing 12 costly errors and being outscored by their opponents 20-14. The pitching staff, led by Pascual Pérez (1-1), Elías Sosa (1-0) and Rick Mahler (0-1), collected a solid 3.24 ERA. In contrast, position players such as Tony Peña, Clint Hurdle, Alfredo Griffin, Julio Franco and Carmen Castillo combined for a .223 average with just two home runs.

Hermosillo was managed by Tom Harmon. The two Mexican victories came at the expense of Puerto Rico, 14–0 and 1–0, behind strong pitching efforts by rookie Fernando Valenzuela and veteran Manuel Ibarra with the help of a bullpen headed by Marty Decker. Notable Mexican legends such as slugger Héctor Espino, SS Mario Mendoza, P Vicente Romo and C Alex Treviño joined the team. Also in the roster were LF Dan Gladden, RF Jerry Hairston, Sr., 3B Junior Moore and 2B Wayne Tolleson.

== Final standings ==
Country	Club	W	L	W/L %	GB	Managers
	Venezuela	5	1	.833	–	Alfonso Carrasquel
	Puerto Rico	3	3	.500	2.0	Ed Nottle
	Dominican Republic	2	4	.333	3.0	Felipe Alou
	Mexico	2	4	.333	3.0	Tom Harmon

Individual leaders
Player/Club	Statistic
Baudilio Díaz / VEN	Batting average	.412
Baudilio Díaz / VEN	Home runs	2
Tony Armas / VEN; Chili Davis / PRI	RBI	6
Luis Salazar / VEN	Runs	6
Luis Salazar / VEN	Stolen bases	4
Luis Leal / VEN	Wins	2
Luis Leal / VEN	Strikeouts	10
Tom Dixon / VEN	ERA	0.00
Luis Leal / VEN	Innings pitched	13
Awards
Baudilio Díaz / VEN	Most Valuable Player
Alfonso Carrasquel / VEN	Manager

All-Star Team
Name/Club	Position
Baudilio Díaz / VEN	catcher
Efraín Vásquez / PRI	first baseman
Steve Sax / VEN	second baseman
Alvin Moore / MEX	third baseman
Mario Mendoza / MEX	shortstop
Luis Salazar / VEN	left fielder
Tony Armas / VEN	center fielder
Don Gladden / MEX	right fielder
Luis Leal / VEN	RH pitcher
Fernando Valenzuela / MEX	LH pitcher
Alfonso Carrasquel / VEN	manager

=== Scoreboards ===
==== Game 1, February 4 ====
Team	1	2	3	4	5	6	7	8	9	R	H	E
Venezuela	1	0	0	0	4	0	0	1	1	7	12	2
Dominican Republic	0	0	0	1	2	0	0	0	0	3	13	6
WP: Luis Leal (1-0) LP: Pascual Pérez (0-1) Sv: Dennis Burtt (1); Home runs: VEN: Baudilio Díaz (1); DOM: None

==== Game 2, February 4 ====
Team	1	2	3	4	5	6	7	8	9	R	H	E
Puerto Rico	0	0	0	0	0	0	0	0	0	0	2	3
Mexico	0	0	1	0	1	6	5	1	X	14	12	0
WP: Fernando Valenzuela (1-0) LP: Willie Hernández (0-1)

==== Game 3, February 5 ====
Team	1	2	3	4	5	6	7	8	9	R	H	E
Dominican Republic	0	0	0	0	0	0	1	0	0	1	5	1
Puerto Rico	2	0	0	3	0	0	0	0	X	5	6	1
WP: John Butcher (1-0) LP: Joe Edelen (0-1)

==== Game 4, February 5 ====
Team	1	2	3	4	5	6	7	8	9	R	H	E
Mexico	0	1	0	0	0	0	0	0	0	1	10	4
Venezuela	0	0	1	3	1	4	1	0	X	10	16	3
WP: Bud Black (1-0) LP: Alfredo Moreno (0-1)

==== Game 5, February 6 ====
Team	1	2	3	4	5	6	7	8	9	R	H	E
Venezuela	0	1	0	0	0	0	0	0	0	1	6	5
Puerto Rico	0	0	0	3	1	2	0	0	X	7	9	0
WP: Edwin Núñez (1-0) LP: Joe Cowley (0-1)

==== Game 6, February 6 ====
Team	1	2	3	4	5	6	7	8	9	10	11	R	H	E
Mexico	1	0	0	0	0	0	0	0	0	0	0	1	7	1
Dominican Republic	0	0	0	0	0	0	0	0	1	0	1	2	7	1
WP: Elías Sosa (1-0) LP: Marty Decker (0-1); Home runs: MEX: None; DOM: José Moreno (1)

==== Game 7, February 7 ====
Team	1	2	3	4	5	6	7	8	9	10	11	R	H	E
Dominican Republic	0	0	0	0	0	0	0	0	0	0	0	0	3	2
Venezuela	0	0	0	0	0	0	0	0	0	0	1	1	4	2
WP: Ed Vandenberg (1-0) LP: Rick Mahler (0-1)

==== Game 8, February 7 ====
Team	1	2	3	4	5	6	7	8	9	R	H	E
Mexico	0	1	0	0	0	0	0	0	0	1	5	2
Puerto Rico	0	0	0	0	0	0	0	0	0	0	3	0
WP: Manuel Ibarra (1-0) LP: Rich Rodas (0-1)

==== Game 9, February 8 ====
Team	1	2	3	4	5	6	7	8	9	R	H	E
Puerto Rico	1	0	0	0	0	0	0	2	0	3	10	1
Dominican Republic	0	0	1	0	1	0	0	0	0	2	2	2
WP: Willie Hernández (1-1) LP: Steve Ratzer (0-1)

==== Game 10, February 8 ====
Team	1	2	3	4	5	6	7	8	9	R	H	E
Venezuela	0	0	0	1	0	0	0	0	0	1	5	1
Mexico	0	0	0	0	0	0	0	0	0	0	2	3
WP: Dennis Burtt (1-0) LP: Vicente Romo (0-1) Sv: Ed Vandenberg (1)

==== Game 11, February 9 ====
Team	1	2	3	4	5	6	7	8	9	R	H	E
Puerto Rico	0	0	0	0	0	0	1	0	0	1	4	1
Venezuela	0	1	0	0	0	1	0	0	X	2	10	0
WP: Luis Leal (2-0) LP: John Butcher (1-1); Home runs: PRI: None; VEN: Baudilio Díaz (2)

==== Game 12, February 9 ====
Team	1	2	3	4	5	6	7	8	9	R	H	E
Dominican Republic	0	0	0	0	0	1	0	3	3	7	14	1
Mexico	0	0	0	1	0	0	1	0	0	2	6	3
WP: Pascual Pérez (1-1) LP: Ernesto Escárrega (0-1); Home runs: DOM: Tony Peña (1); MEX: None

== See also ==
- Ballplayers who have played in the Series

== Sources ==
- Antero Núñez, José. Series del Caribe. Jefferson, Caracas, Venezuela: Impresos Urbina, C.A., 1987.
- Gutiérrez, Daniel. Enciclopedia del Béisbol en Venezuela – 1895–2006 . Caracas, Venezuela: Impresión Arte, C.A., 2007.
