= Pete Mackanin =

American baseball player and manager (born 1951)

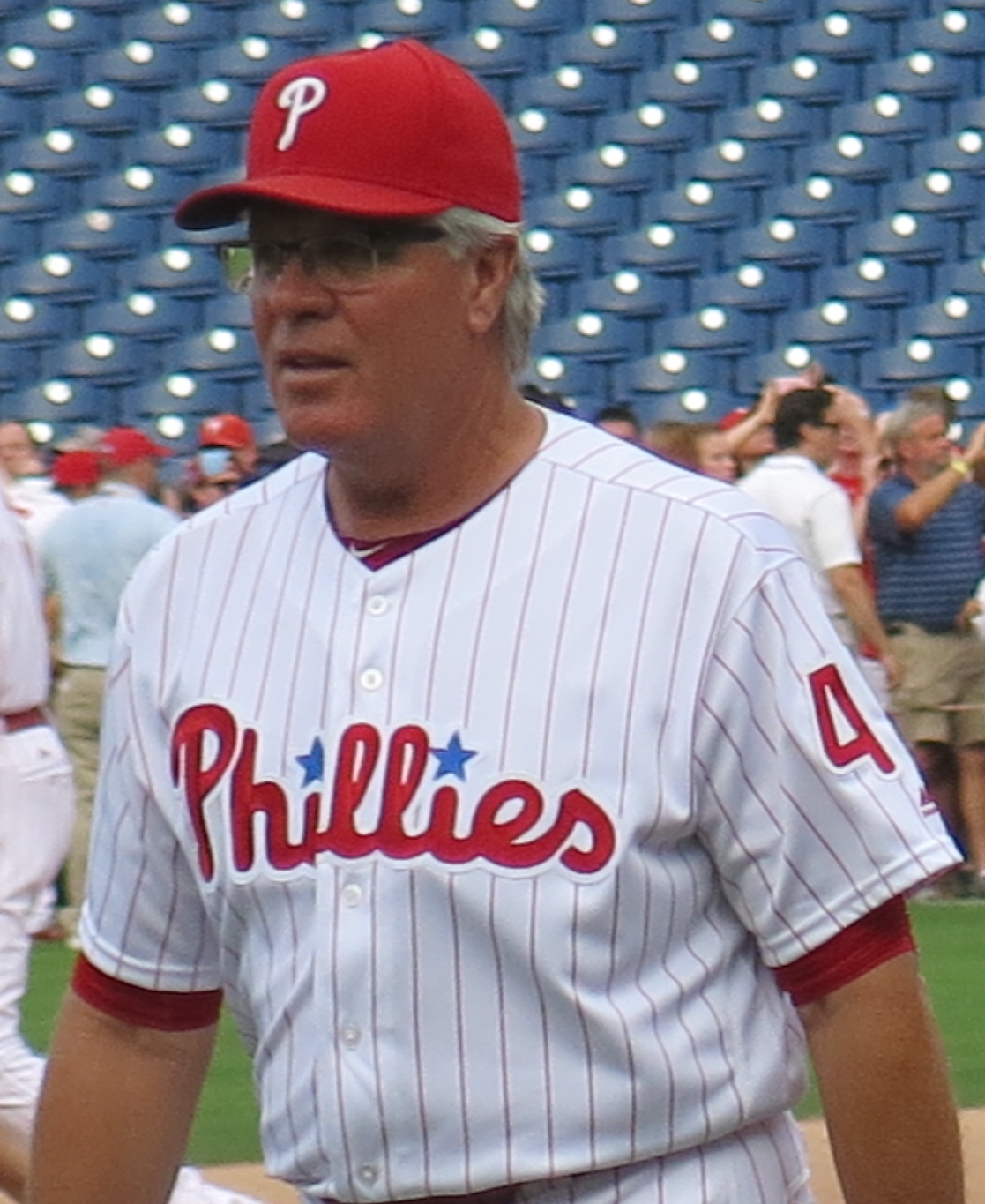
- Mackanin with the Phillies in 2016
- Second baseman / Manager
- Born: August 1, 1951 (age 75); Chicago, Illinois, U.S.
- Batted: Right Threw: Right

MLB debut
- July 3, 1973, for the Texas Rangers

Last MLB appearance
- October 3, 1981, for the Minnesota Twins

MLB statistics
- Batting average: .226
- Home runs: 30
- Runs batted in: 141
- Managerial record: 227–291
- Winning %: .438
- Stats at Baseball Reference
- Managerial record at Baseball Reference

Teams
- As player: Texas Rangers (1973–1974); Montreal Expos (1975–1977); Philadelphia Phillies (1978–1979); Minnesota Twins (1980–1981); As manager: Pittsburgh Pirates (2005); Cincinnati Reds (2007); Philadelphia Phillies (2015–2017); As coach: Montreal Expos (1997–2000); Pittsburgh Pirates (2003–2005); Philadelphia Phillies (2009–2012, 2014–2015)

Peter Mackanin, Jr. (/məˈkænɪn/ mə-KAN-in; born August 1, 1951), is an American former professional baseball utility player, coach, scout, and manager, who played in Major League Baseball (MLB) for the Texas Rangers, Montreal Expos, Philadelphia Phillies, and Minnesota Twins, from 1973 to 1981.

Mackanin briefly managed the Pittsburgh Pirates, in 2005. Following the firing of Cincinnati Reds manager Jerry Narron, in 2007, Mackanin (who was the team's advance scout, at the time) became the acting Reds’ manager, for the duration of that campaign; the Reds then decided to replace Mackanin with Dusty Baker.

Mackanin was the Phillies' bench coach, from 2009 to 2012. After spending the 2013 season as a scout for the New York Yankees, he served as Philadelphia's third base coach in 2014 and 2015, then became interim manager, following Ryne Sandberg’s resignation. The Phillies later announced that they were removing the "interim" label and Mackanin would serve as the team's manager in 2016. On September 29, 2017, the team announced that Mackanin would not return as the Phillies’ field manager, for the 2018 season.

== Major league career ==
Mackanin was drafted by the Washington Senators in the 1969 Major League Baseball draft and made his debut with them in 1973, after they moved and became the Texas Rangers. He was traded along with Don Stanhouse from the Rangers to the Montreal Expos for Willie Davis at the Winter Meetings on December 5, 1974. He also played with the Philadelphia Phillies and Minnesota Twins. Mackanin's best season offensively was in 1975, when he posted a .225 batting average, along with 12 home runs, and 44 runs batted in (RBI).

=== Career statistics ===
In a nine-year big league career, Mackanin's career statistics include 548 games played, 355 hits, 1,570 at bats, a .226 career batting average, 30 home runs, 141 RBI, and an on-base percentage of .263. He ended his career with an overall .963 fielding percentage.

== Managerial career ==
=== Early career ===
After retiring as a player, Mackanin spent many years managing and coaching in the minor leagues. He became the Expos' third base coach in 1997 and spent four years in that position. After managing the minor league Hickory Crawdads and Lynchburg Hillcats in 2001 and 2002, Mackanin became the bench coach for the Pittsburgh Pirates for the 2003 season. After Lloyd McClendon was fired, Mackanin served as the Pirates' interim manager for the last month of 2005, leading the team to a 12–14 record. He spent the next season managing in the Pirates' minor league system at Bradenton.

Mackanin was hired by the Cincinnati Reds as a scout for the 2007 season, but when the team fired manager Jerry Narron on July 1 of that year, he was named the club's interim manager. Narron had led the Reds in the first half of the 2007 season to a league-worst 51 losses, but during Mackanin's tenure, the team had a winning percentage above .500. The Reds decided not to hire Mackanin on permanently for the 2008 campaign, instead deciding on veteran experience with Dusty Baker.

Mackanin was hired by the Philadelphia Phillies in 2009 as the bench coach. On October 3, 2012, the Phillies fired him by deciding not to renew his contract for the 2013 season. He was rehired by the Phillies for the 2014 season to be the 3rd base coach for Ryne Sandberg.

On June 26, 2015, Mackanin was appointed Phillies manager after Sandberg suddenly stepped down. In 2015 Mackanin was successful on a lower percentage of replay challenges than any other MLB manager with 10 or more challenges, at 76.2%.

On September 29, 2017, the Phillies announced that Mackanin would not return for the 2018 season, but would instead take on a front office role for the remainder of his contract.

=== Managerial record ===
As of October 1, 2017

Team	From	To	Regular season record			Post–season record		
Team	From	To	W	L	Win %	W	L	Win %
Pittsburgh Pirates	2005	2005	12	14	.462	DNQ		
Cincinnati Reds	2007	2007	41	39	.513	DNQ		
Philadelphia Phillies	2015	2017	174	238	.422	DNQ		
Total			227	291	.438	0	0	–

== Venezuelan League ==
In between Major league seasons, Mackanin played for the Leones del Caracas, Cardenales de Lara, and Águilas del Zulia clubs of the Venezuelan Winter League during five seasons spanning 1973–80. He later managed the Águilas in two seasons, guiding the team to the 1989 Caribbean Series title.

== Personal life ==
Mackanin was born in Chicago, Illinois. He is a graduate of Brother Rice High School and the University of Illinois at Chicago in Chicago.

Mackanin is married to Nancy and they have one son.

Sporting positions
Preceded by Joe Maddon	Peoria Chiefs Manager; 1985–1986	Succeeded by Jim Tracy
Preceded by Larry Cox	Iowa Cubs Manager; 1988–1989	Succeeded by Jim Essian
Preceded by Frank Lucchesi	Nashville Sounds Manager; 1990–1992	Succeeded by Dave Miley
Preceded by Bob Miscik	Frederick Keys Manager; 1993	Succeeded by Mike O'Berry
Preceded by Don Buford	Bowie Baysox Manager; 1994	Succeeded by Bob Miscik
Preceded by Jim Tracy	Ottawa Lynx Manager; 1995–1996	Succeeded by Pat Kelly
Preceded by Jay Loviglio	Hickory Crawdads Manager; 2001	Succeeded by Tony Beasley
Preceded by Curtis Wilkerson	Lynchburg Hillcats Manager; 2002	Succeeded by Dave Clark
Preceded by Jeff Livesey	Gulf Coast League Pirates Manager; 2006	Succeeded by Tom Prince
Preceded by Jimy Williams	Philadelphia Phillies Bench Coach; 2009–2012	Succeeded by nobody
Preceded by Juan Samuel	Philadelphia Phillies Third Base; 2014–2015	Succeeded by Juan Samuel
