= 2008–09 Venezuelan Professional Baseball League season =

List of Venezuelan Baseball League seasons

The 2008–09 Venezuelan Professional Baseball League season (Spanish: Liga Venezolana de Béisbol Profesional or LVBP):

== Regular season standings ==
| Team | Wins | Losses | Pct | GB |
|---|---|---|---|---|
| (C)Leones del Caracas | 42 | 21 | .667 | – |
| (C)Tigres de Aragua | 36 | 27 | .571 | 6 |
| (C)Cardenales de Lara | 33 | 30 | .524 | 9 |
| (C)Tiburones de la Guaira | 31 | 32 | .492 | 11 |
| (C)Aguilas del Zulia | 31 | 32 | .492 | 11 |
| Navegantes del Magallanes | 28 | 35 | .444 | 14 |
| Caribes de Anzoátegui | 28 | 35 | .444 | 14 |
| Bravos de Margarita | 23 | 40 | .365 | 19 |

(C)Classified to the Round Robin

== Round robin ==
| Team | Wins | Losses | Pct | GB |
|---|---|---|---|---|
| #Tigres de Aragua | 9 | 7 | .563 | – |
| #Leones del Caracas | 9 | 7 | .563 | – |
| #Tiburones de la Guaira | 9 | 7 | .563 | – |
| Cardenales de Lara | 7 | 9 | .438 | 2.5 |
| Aguilas del Zulia | 6 | 10 | .375 | 3.5 |

(#)Aragua, Caracas and La Guaira played two extra-playoff-games:

1st Game: (C)Caracas defeated Aragua 5-2

2nd Game: (C)Aragua defeated La Guaira 3-1

(C)Classified to the Championship series.

== Championship series ==
| Team | Wins | Losses | Pct | GB |
|---|---|---|---|---|
| Tigres de Aragua | 4 | 3 | .571 | – |
| Leones del Caracas | 3 | 4 | .429 | 1 |

Tigres de Aragua LVBP 2008-2009 Champions

== Awards ==
Most Valuable Player (Víctor Davalillo Award): Jesús Guzmán (Caracas)

Overall Offensive Performer of the year: Jesús Guzmán (Caracas)

Rookie of the year: Max Ramírez (La Guaira)

Comeback of the year: Wilfredo Romero (La Guaira)

Manager of the year (Chico Carrasquel Award): Frank Kremblas (Caracas)

Pitcher of the year (Carrao Bracho Award): David Austen (Zulia)

Closer of the year: Alex Serrano (Margarita)

Setup of the year: Luke Gregerson (Margarita)

== Highlights ==
Jesús Guzmán finished with 67 RBI to set a new league record, surpassing the old mark of 67 set by Pete Koegel in the 1973-1974 season.

The Tigres de Aragua won their 3rd straight championship, becoming the 2nd team in VPBL history to do it.
