= 1998–99 Venezuelan Professional Baseball League season =

Venezuelan professional baseball season

The 1998–99 Venezuelan Professional Baseball League season (Spanish: Liga Venezolana de Béisbol Profesional or LVBP):

== Regular season standings ==
=== Eastern Division ===
Team	Wins	Losses	Pct	GB
(C)Navegantes de Magallanes	35	27	.565	–
(C)Leones del Caracas	34	28	.548	1
Tiburones de la Guaira	30	33	.476	5.5
Caribes de Oriente	24	37	.393	10.5

=== Western Division ===
Team	Wins	Losses	Pct	GB
(C)Cardenales de Lara	35	26	.574	–
(C)Tigres de Aragua	34	28	.548	1.5
(C)Aguilas del Zulia	31	32	.492	5
Pastora de los Llanos	25	37	.403	10.5

(C)Classified to the Round Robin

=== Wild Card ===
Team	Wins	Losses	Pct	GB
#Aguilas del Zulia	31	32	.492	–
#Tiburones de la Guaira	30	33	.476	1
Pastora de los Llanos	25	37	.403	5.5
Caribes de Oriente	24	37	.393	6

(#)Zulia and La Guaira played a one-game playoff

== Round robin ==
Team	Wins	Losses	Pct.	GB
(C)Leones del Caracas	10	6	.625	–
(C)Cardenales de Lara	10	6	.625	–
Aguilas del Zulia	9	7	.563	1
Navegantes del Magallanes	7	9	.438	3
Tigres de Aragua	4	12	.250	6

(C)Classified to the Championship series.

== Championship series ==
Team	Wins	Losses	Pct.	GB
Cardenales de Lara	4	2	.667	–
Leones del Caracas	2	4	.333	–

Cardenales de Lara LVBP 1998-1999 Champions

== Awards ==
Most Valuable Player (Víctor Davalillo Award): Luis Raven (Los Llanos)

Overall Offensive Performer of the year: Luis Raven (Los Llanos)

Rookie of the year: Luis Rivas (Magallanes)

Comeback of the year: Pedro Castellano (Aragua)

Pitcher of the year (Carrao Bracho Award): Mike Romano (Lara)

Reliever of the year: Orber Moreno (Caracas)
