= 1989 Caribbean Series =

1989 baseball tournament

The thirty-first edition of the Caribbean Series (Serie del Caribe) was held from February 4 through February 9 of 1989 with the champion baseball teams of the Dominican Republic, Leones del Escogido; Mexico, Águilas de Mexicali; Puerto Rico, Indios de Mayagüez, and Venezuela, Águilas del Zulia. The format consisted of 12 games, each team facing the other teams twice, and the games were played at Estadio Teodoro Mariscal in Mazatlán, Mexico.

== Final standings ==
Country	Club	W	L	W/L %	Managers
Venezuela	Águilas del Zulia	5	1	.833	Pete Mackanin
Puerto Rico	Indios de Mayagüez	4	2	.667	Tom Gamboa
Mexico	Águilas de Mexicali	2	4	.333	Dave Machemer
Dominican Republic	Leones del Escogido	1	5	.167	Phil Regan

== Individual leaders ==
Player	Statistic
Batting
Matías Carrillo (MEX)	Batting average	.500
Phil Stephenson (VEN)	Runs	6
Matías Carrillo (MEX)	Hits	10
Six tied	Doubles	2
Three tied	Triples	1
Phil Stephenson (VEN)	Home runs	3
Ken Caminiti (PUR); Ron Washington (MEX); Phil Stephenson (VEN)	RBI	7
Pitching
Dale Polley (VEN)	Wins	2

== All-Star team ==
Name	Position
Joe Girardi (VEN)	Catcher
Phil Stephenson (VEN)	First baseman
Norman Carrasco (VEN)	Second baseman
Carlos Martínez (VEN)	Third baseman
Houston Jiménez (MEX)	Shortstop
Gerónimo Berroa (DOM)	Left fielder
Chris Knabenshue (MEX)	Center fielder
Matías Carrillo (MEX)	Right fielder
Dale Polley (VEN)	Left handed pitcher
Leonard Damian (VEN)	Right handed pitcher
Awards
Phil Stephenson (VEN)	Most Valuable Player
Pete Mackanin (VEN)	Manager

== See also ==
- Ballplayers who have played in the Series

== Sources ==
- Nuñez, José Antero (1994). Serie del Caribe de la Habana a Puerto La Cruz. JAN Editor. ISBN 980-07-2389-7
