= 2007–08 Venezuelan Professional Baseball League season =

The 2007–08 Venezuelan Professional Baseball League season.

For the first time in a regular season, Leones, Zulia and Magallanes were eliminated making the first time a Venezuelan Caribbean Series Champion didn't make the postseason. On the other hand, Bravos de Margarita earned a trip to the playoffs after moving from Araure. Omar Vizquel played his last season with the Leones del Caracas.

== LVBP ==
Team	Wins	Losses	Pct	GB
Caribes de Anzoátegui	39	24	.619	–
Cardenales de Lara	34	29	.540	5
Tigres de Aragua	32	31	.508	7
Bravos de Margarita	31	32	.492	8
Tiburones de la Guaira	30	33	.476	9
Navegantes del Magallanes	29	34	.460	10
Leones del Caracas	29	34	.460	10
Aguilas del Zulia	28	35	.444	11

== Round robin ==
Team	Wins	Losses	Pct.	GB
Cardenales de Lara	12	4	.750	–
Tigres de Aragua	12	4	.750	–
Tiburones de la Guaira	7	9	.438	5
Caribes de Anzoátegui	5	11	.313	7
Bravos de Margarita	4	12	.250	8

Despite having the best record in the regular season, Caribes didn't make to the final series.

== Championship series ==
Team	Wins	Losses	Pct.	GB
Tigres de Aragua	4	2	.667	–
Cardenales de Lara	2	4	.333	2

Tigres won in 6 disputed games the 2007-08 championship.
