= 2005–06 Venezuelan Professional Baseball League season =

The 2005-2006 Venezuelan Professional Baseball League season (Spanish: Liga Venezolana de Béisbol Profesional or LVBP) was won by the team Leones del Caracas.

== Regular season standings ==
=== Eastern Division ===
Team	Wins	Losses	Pct	GB
Navegantes de Magallanes	39	23	.629	–
Leones del Caracas	35	27	.565	4
Caribes de Anzoátegui	32	30	.516	7
Tiburones de La Guaira	31	31	.500	8

=== Western Division ===
Team	Wins	Losses	Pct	GB
Tigres de Aragua	38	24	.613	–
Cardenales de Lara	27	35	.435	11
Pastora de los Llanos	23	39	.371	15
Águilas del Zulia	23	39	.371	15

== Playoffs ==
Team	Wins	Losses	Pct.	GB
Tigres de Aragua	10	6	.625	–
Leones del Caracas	10	6	.625	–
Navegantes de Magallanes	9	7	.563	1
Cardenales de Lara	7	9	.438	3
Caribes de Anzoátegui	4	12	.250	6

== Championship series ==
- Game 1: Tigres de Aragua 7, Leones del Caracas 4 (Aragua leads 1-0)
- Game 2: Leones del Caracas 8, Aragua Tigers 6 (Series tied 1-1)
- Game 3: Leones del Caracas 8, Aragua Tigers 4 (Caracas leads 2-1)
- Game 4: Leones del Caracas 5, Aragua Tigers 3 (Caracas leads 3-1)
- Game 5: Leones del Caracas 5, Aragua Tigers 1 (Caracas wins series, 4-1)
