= Henry Blanco =

Venezuelan baseball player and coach (born 1971)

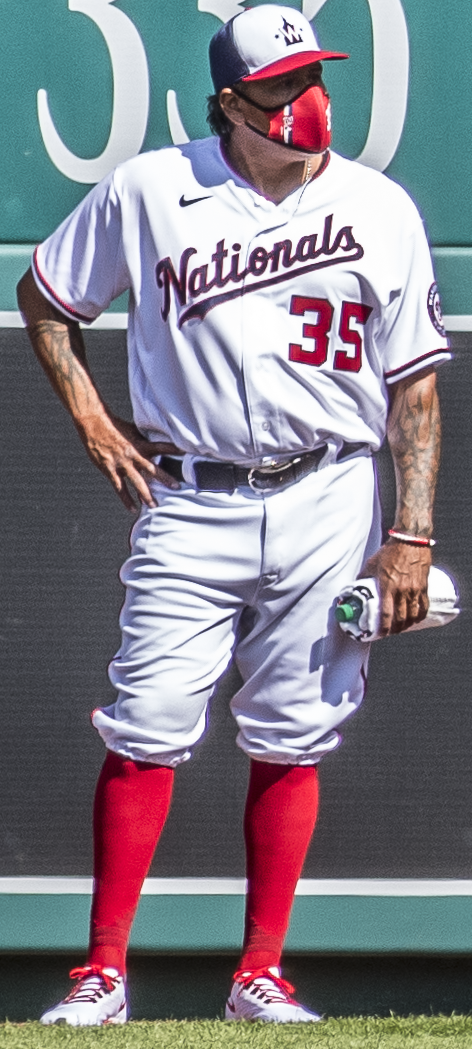
- Blanco with the Nationals in 2021

Sultanes de Monterrey
- Catcher / Coach / Manager
- Born: August 29, 1971 (age 54); Caracas, Venezuela
- Batted: Right Threw: Right

MLB debut
- July 25, 1997, for the Los Angeles Dodgers

Last MLB appearance
- September 23, 2013, for the Seattle Mariners

MLB statistics
- Batting average: .223
- Home runs: 72
- Runs batted in: 298
- Stats at Baseball Reference

Teams
- As player: Los Angeles Dodgers (1997); Colorado Rockies (1999); Milwaukee Brewers (2000–2001); Atlanta Braves (2002–2003); Minnesota Twins (2004); Chicago Cubs (2005–2008); San Diego Padres (2009); New York Mets (2010); Arizona Diamondbacks (2011–2012); Toronto Blue Jays (2013); Seattle Mariners (2013); As coach: Arizona Diamondbacks (2014); Chicago Cubs (2015–2017); Washington Nationals (2018–2025)

Career highlights and awards
- 2× World Series champion (2016, 2019)

Henry Ramón Blanco (born August 29, 1971) is a Venezuelan former professional baseball catcher who currently serves as the manager for the Sultanes de Monterrey of the Mexican League. He played in Major League Baseball (MLB) from 1997 to 2013, appearing for the Los Angeles Dodgers, Colorado Rockies, Milwaukee Brewers, Atlanta Braves, Minnesota Twins, Chicago Cubs, San Diego Padres, New York Mets, Arizona Diamondbacks, Toronto Blue Jays, and Seattle Mariners. He later served as quality assurance coach for the Cubs. Although a light-hitting player, he was regarded as one of the best defensive catchers of his era.

== Professional career ==
Blanco began his professional baseball career in 1989 when, he was signed by the Los Angeles Dodgers as an amateur free agent. He didn't begin to play as a catcher until 1995. After 7 years in the minor leagues, he finally blossomed in 1997 when he hit for a .313 batting average in 91 games for the Albuquerque Dukes of the Pacific Coast League. At the age of 25, Blanco made his major league debut with the Dodgers on July 25, 1997. He returned to play for Albuquerque in 1998 and was granted free agency in October of that year.

In December 1998, Blanco signed a contract to play for the Colorado Rockies and won the starting catcher's role for the 1999 season. Hitting for a .232 batting average, he embellished his defensive credentials by leading National League catchers with 39 baserunners caught stealing. In December 1999, he was traded to the Milwaukee Brewers as part of a three-team trade. Blanco caught the majority of the Brewers' games in 2000, posting a .236 batting average with 7 home runs, 31 runs batted in. He led National League catchers with a 58.2% baserunners caught stealing percentage, the highest percentage since 1982 when Bob Boone also had a 58.2% success rate. His batting average fell to .210 in the 2001 season and, in March 2002, he was traded to the Atlanta Braves for Paul Bako and José Cabrera.

While Blanco served as a reserve catcher with the Braves working behind Javy Lopez, he also became known as Greg Maddux' personal catcher, a role he inherited from fellow Venezuelan catcher, Eddie Pérez. Although he only produced 22 runs batted in, he had 5 game-winning RBIs and provided solid defense, helping the Braves win the National League Eastern Division title. Blanco was the starting catcher for the Braves in Game 3 of the 2002 National League Division Series and was a late-inning replacement in Game 5 as the Braves were defeated by the San Francisco Giants. In January 2003, Blanco signed a $1.3 million, one-year contract with the Braves.

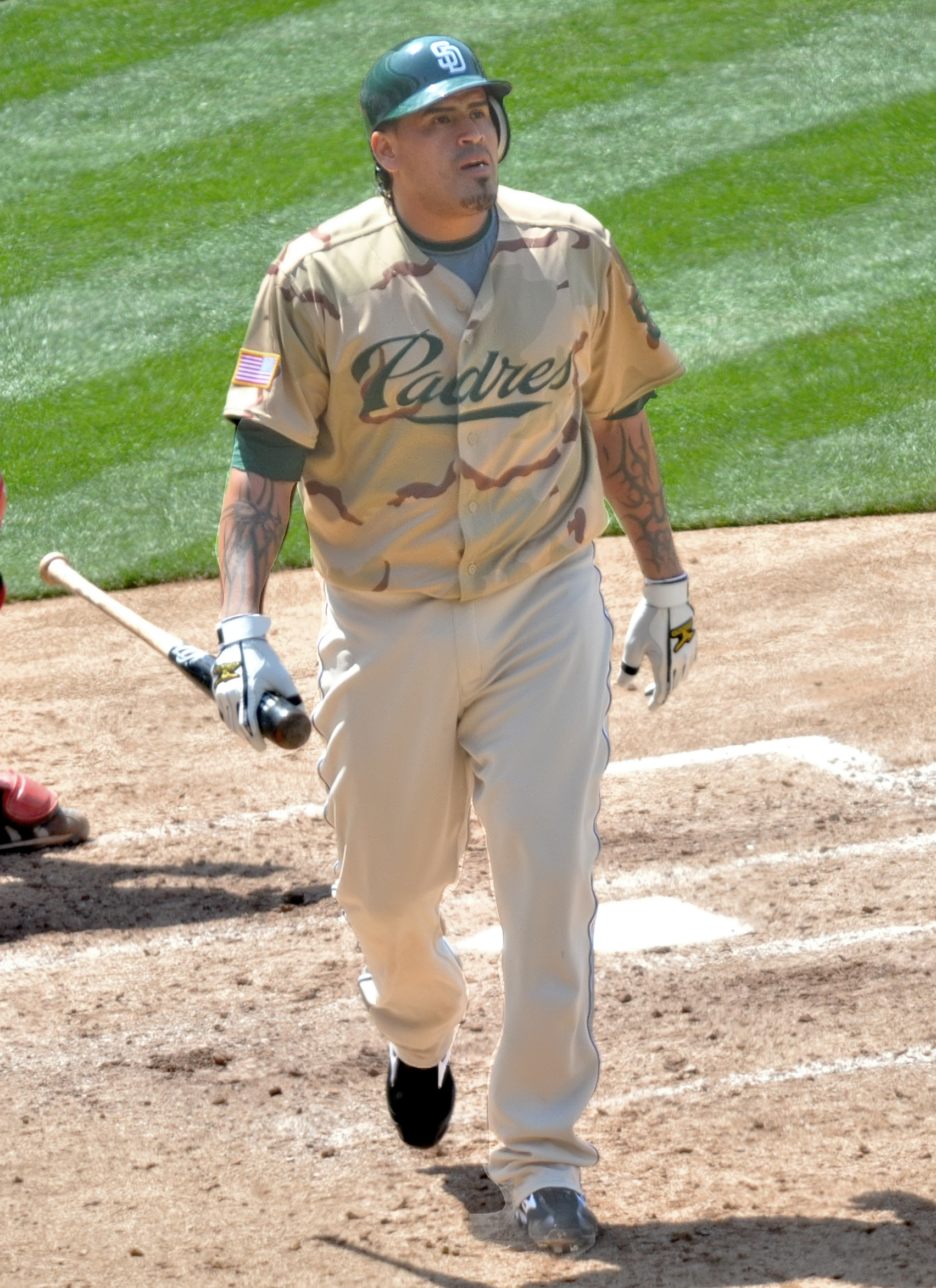
Blanco reacts after striking out in 2009, during his tenure with the San Diego Padres.

The Braves repeated as Eastern Division champions in 2003 however, Blanco's batting average dropped to .199 and he was left off the post-season roster in favor of catcher Johnny Estrada as, the Braves lost to the Chicago Cubs in the 2003 National League Division Series. When the Braves assigned him to the Triple-A Richmond Braves at the end of the season, Blanco opted for free agency and, in December 2003, he signed a one-year, $750,000 contract to play for the Minnesota Twins.

Blanco became a valuable member of the Twins when rookie catcher Joe Mauer was injured early in the 2004 season. He was credited for helping the Twins pitching staff with his game-calling skills, guiding them to the lowest team earned run average in the league. Twins pitcher, Johan Santana, gave Blanco credit for helping him win the 2004 American League Cy Young Award. He caught the majority of the Twins' games helping them to clinch the American League Central division title. Blanco posted career-highs with 10 home runs and 37 runs batted in, while leading the American League catchers with a 49.2% caught stealing percentage. He started all four games of the 2004 American League Division Series, hitting 1 home run along with a .250 batting average as the Twins lost to the New York Yankees.

After failing to reach a contract agreement with the Twins after the 2004 season, Blanco opted for free agency again and, in December 2004 he signed a two-year, $2.7 million contract to play for the Chicago Cubs. He worked as a backup catcher to Michael Barrett although, many of the Cubs pitchers preferred pitching to Blanco as his 2005 catcher's earned run average of 3.58 was almost 1 run lower than the 4.45 average posted by Barrett.

In the 2006 Caribbean Series, Blanco had a walk off double off the top of the opposing shortstop's head in the championship game to give the Leones del Caracas the series championship win over the Tigres del Licey. In the 2006 major league season, he hit for a .266 batting average with a career-high 37 runs batted in and, in November, signed a two-year contract for $5.25 million to remain with the Cubs. Blanco appeared in only 22 games for the Cubs in 2007, missing two months of the season due to a herniated disc. The Cubs went on to win the National League Central division although, Blanco did not appear in any post-season games. In 2008, Blanco hit a career-high .292 while serving as backup and mentor to rookie catcher Geovany Soto, who went on to win the 2008 National League Rookie of the Year Award.

After the 2008 season, Blanco's option was declined making him a free agent. In January 2009, he signed a $750,000, one-year contract to play for the San Diego Padres. During the 2009 season, he was a pinch-hitter, late-inning defensive replacement, and a mentor for Padres starting catcher Nick Hundley. Blanco signed a one-year, $1.5 million contract with the New York Mets on December 3, 2009. On May 8, 2010, Blanco hit a walk-off home run to help the Mets defeat the San Francisco Giants 5–4.

Blanco signed a one-year contract on December 15, 2010, with the Arizona Diamondbacks. He played in 37 games, hitting .250 and was re-signed following the season. He played in 21 games in the 2012 season.

Blanco signed a non-guaranteed contract on January 11, 2013, with the Toronto Blue Jays. Blanco made the opening day roster for Toronto as the batterymate to recently acquired 2012 NL Cy Young winner R. A. Dickey. Blanco and Dickey previously played together for the New York Mets during the 2010 season, and Dickey had said Blanco was "the best [Dickey's] had seen at catching the knuckleball". Blanco was designated for assignment on June 7, 2013, and released on June 10. He batted .184 with the Blue Jays in 15 games played, with no home runs or RBI.

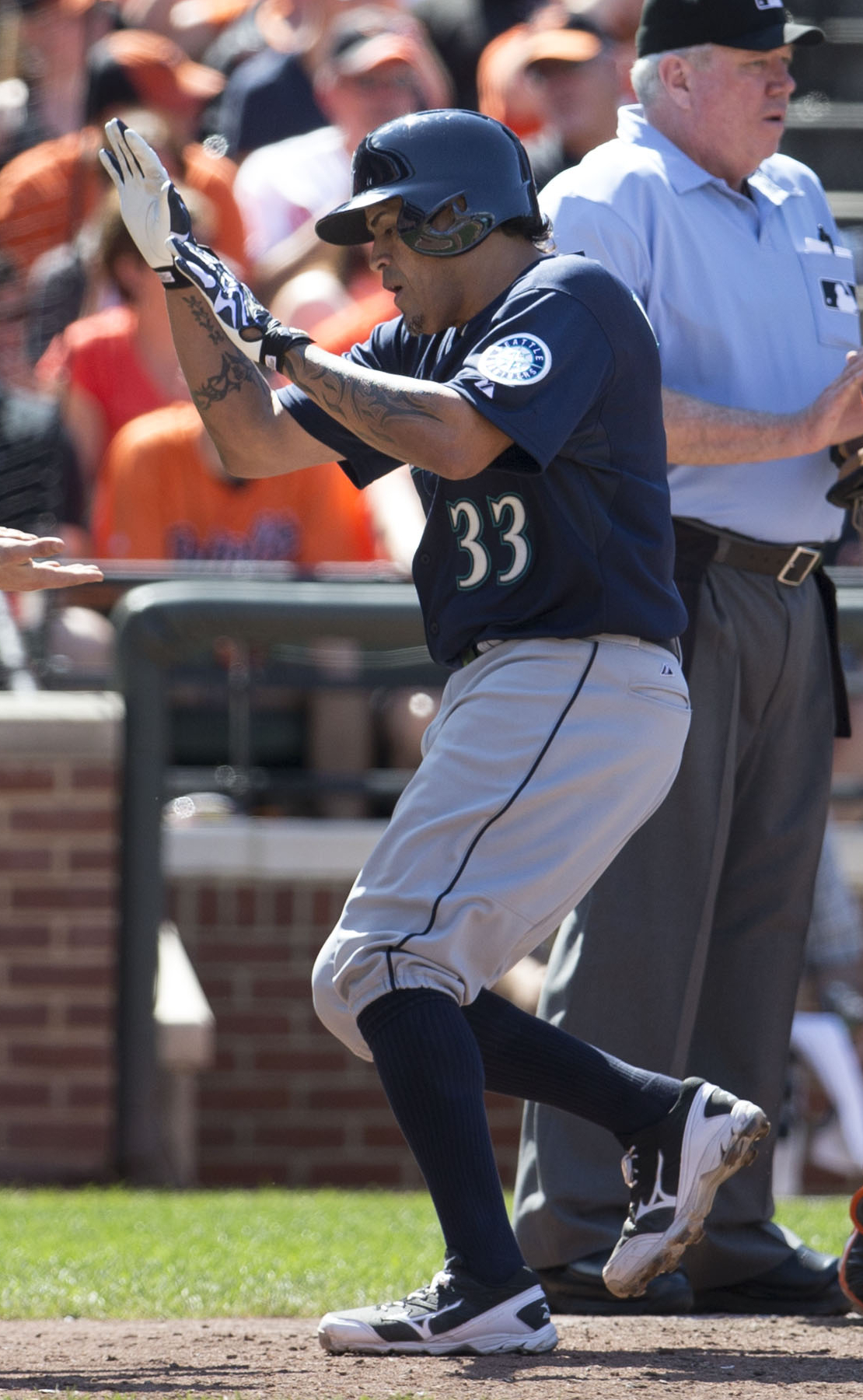
Blanco with the Seattle Mariners in 2013

Blanco was signed by the Seattle Mariners on June 14, 2013, to be a mentor to Mike Zunino. In Blanco's first game with the Mariners on June 15 (against the Oakland Athletics), he hit a grand slam down the left field line. On July 25, Zunino broke his left hand, and Blanco began splitting the catching duties with recently signed Humberto Quintero. On August 1, 2013, Blanco hit his second grand slam since becoming a Mariner. This one also down the left field line, against the Boston Red Sox starting pitcher Ryan Dempster which gave the Mariners a 7–1 lead, but the bullpen allowed seven runs in the final two innings in an 8–7 loss.

In 35 games with the Mariners, Blanco hit .125/.215/.240 with 3 HR and 14 RBI, while throwing out 6 of 16 would-be base stealers. He played in his final major league game on September 23, 2013, at the age of 41. He was designated for assignment on October 8, 2013, after the Mariners claimed outfield prospect Travis Witherspoon off waivers from the Los Angeles Angels. He elected free agency the next day.

== Career statistics ==
In a sixteen-year major league career, Blanco played in 971 games, accumulating 615 hits in 2,761 at bats for a .223 career batting average along with 72 home runs, 298 runs batted in and an on-base percentage of .288. Blanco's .994 career fielding percentage ranks 27th all-time among major league catchers. Although he was a light-hitter, Blanco had an extended major league career due to the value of his excellent defensive abilities. He has credited former catcher Mike Scioscia, who was the catching coordinator during his time with the Dodgers, with helping him develop his catching skills.

== Coaching career ==
=== Arizona Diamondbacks ===
Blanco signed a minor league contract, that included an invitation to spring training, with the Arizona Diamondbacks on December 13, 2013. He was released on March 31, 2014, and immediately re-joined the Diamondbacks as a coach.

=== Chicago Cubs ===
On November 22, 2014, Blanco was hired by the Chicago Cubs to be their quality assurance coach. He won the 2016 World Series with the Cubs as a coach.

=== Washington Nationals ===
After three seasons as a Chicago coach, Blanco joined former Cubs bench coach Dave Martinez on the staff of the Washington Nationals as the team's bullpen coach. His hiring was announced November 15, 2017. On November 4, 2021, Blanco was transitioned to the role of catching and strategy coach.

Blanco made his managerial debut with the Bravos de Margarita club of the Venezuelan League in the 2014–2015 season.

On July 9, 2025, Blanco was promoted to the role of bench coach, following the firing of Martinez, which prompted the incumbent Miguel Cairo to be promoted to interim manager. He was let go following the 2025 season.

=== Sultanes de Monterrey ===
On November 4, 2025, Blanco was hired to serve as the manager for the Sultanes de Monterrey of the Mexican League.

== Personal life ==
In April 2025, Blanco was erroneously reported as having survived the Jet Set nightclub roof collapse in Santo Domingo, which killed 236 people. It later emerged that initial media reports had confused him with Dominican MLB player Tony Blanco, who died in the disaster; Blanco clarified on social media that he was not present at the club the day of the disaster.

== See also ==
- List of Major League Baseball players from Venezuela

Sporting positions
Preceded by Dan Firova	Washington Nationals bullpen coach 2018–2021	Succeeded by Ricky Bones
