= Bravos de Margarita =

Information
- League: Venezuelan Professional Baseball League
- Location: Porlamar, Margarita Island, Venezuela
- Ballpark: Estadio Nueva Esparta
- Founded: 1991
- Former name: Petroleros de Cabimas 1991-1995; Pastora de Occidente 1995-1997; Pastora de los Llanos 1997-2007; Bravos de Margarita 2007-present
- Manager: Henry Blanco

Current uniforms
Home	Away

Bravos de Margarita (Margarita Braves) are a professional baseball team who plays in the Venezuelan Professional Baseball League since the 2007-08 season.

== History ==
The team was founded in 1991 as the Petroleros de Cabimas (Cabimas Oilers), and played through the 1994-95 season. Later was renamed as Pastora de Occidente (Shepherds of the West) from 1995-96 to 1996-97, being also known as Pastora de los Llanos (Shepherds of the Plains) from 1997-98 to 2006-07.

The Bravos de Margarita play at Estadio Nueva Esparta located in Margarita Island. They have since used other stadiums in the LVBP as temporary home fields.

== Current roster ==
Bravos de Margarita Week 7 Roster
Players		Coaches
Pitchers: 34 (Venezuela) Gabriel Alfaro; 26 (Venezuela) Adrián Almeida; 37 (Venezuela) Luis Bastardo; 49 (Venezuela) Omar Bencomo Jr.; 60 (United States) Logan Darnell; 43 (Venezuela) Moisés Gómez; 17 (Venezuela) Alfred Gutiérrez; 65 (Venezuela) Carlos Navas; 12 (Venezuela) Ángel Nesbitt; 20 (Venezuela) Anthony Ortega; 23 (Venezuela) Omar Poveda; 35 (Venezuela) Luis Ramírez; 36 (Venezuela) Mario Sánchez; 38 (United States) Arik Sikula; 57 (United States) Rick Teasley; 51 (Venezuela) Randy Valladares; 72 (Venezuela) Kender Villegas; 61 (Venezuela) Luis Ysla; Roster updated on 25 November 2018	Catchers: 13 (Venezuela) Francisco Díaz; 55 (Venezuela) Pabel Manzanero; Infielders: 05 (Venezuela) Luis Castro; 16 (Venezuela) Alberti Chávez; 22 (Venezuela) Imeldo Díaz; 07 (Venezuela) Carlos García; 32 (Venezuela) Daniel Mayora; 03 (United States) José Rojas; 02 (Venezuela) Erick Salcedo; Outfielders: 45 (United States) Cade Gotta; 08 (Venezuela) Jonel Pacheco; 54 (Mexico) Cristhian Presichi; 10 (Dominican Republic) Olmo Rosario	Manager: -- (Venezuela) Henry Blanco; Coaches: 66 (Venezuela) Iván Arteaga (Pitching); 48 (Venezuela) Omar Bencomo Sr. (Bullpen); 44 (Puerto Rico) Hiram Bocachica (Hitting); 30 (Venezuela) José Ceballos (First Base); 04 (Venezuela) David Davalillo (Third Base); 14 (Venezuela) Reinaldo Ruiz (Bench)

== Team's yearly record ==
14 seasons total

=== 2007–2015 playoff format ===
Regular season	G	W	L	Place	Round Robin playoff	G	W	L	Place	Final series	G	W	L	Opponent
2007-08	63	31	32	4th	Clinched berth	16	4	12	5th					
2008-09	63	20	43	8th										
2009-10	63	30	33	4th	Clinched berth	16	5	11	5th					
2010-11	61	31	30	5th	Clinched berth	16	5	11	4th					
2011-12	63	25	38	8th										
2012-13	61	23	38	7th										
2013-14	63	23	40	8th										
2014-15	62	23	39	8th										

=== 2015–2019 playoff format ===
Regular season	G	W	L	Place	1st round playoff	G	W	L	Opponent	Wild card	G	W	L	Opponent	Semi-finals	G	W	L	Opponent	Finals	G	W	L	Opponent
2015-16	63	28	35	7th																				
2016-17	63	30	33	6th	Clinched berth	7	3	4	Cardenales de Lara															
2017-18	63	25	38	7th																				
2018-19	63	32	31	5th	Clinched berth	5	1	4	Cardenales de Lara															
2019-20	42	15	27	8th																				

=== 2020– playoff format ===
Regular season	Division	G	W	L	Place	Semi-finals	G	W	L	Opponent	Finals	G	W	L	Opponent
2020-21	Occidental	40	20	20	3rd										
