= Bob Mariano (baseball) =

Robert Joseph Mariano (born June 5, 1957 at Sewickley, Pennsylvania) is an American professional baseball scout, and a former coach and manager. He served as the 2015 manager of the Sacramento River Cats of the Pacific Coast League, Triple-A affiliate of the San Francisco Giants of Major League Baseball. In 2016, he became a member of the Giants' Major League scouting staff, based in Fountain Hills, Arizona.

The 2015 season is Mariano's 36th in professional baseball. After attending Gulf Coast Community College and Louisiana State University, he signed with the New York Yankees in August 1980 as an undrafted free agent and played six seasons of minor league baseball in the Yankees' and Baltimore Orioles' organizations, primarily as a third baseman, and batting .250. He batted left-handed, threw right-handed, stood 6 feet 1 inch (1.85 m) tall and weighed 185 pounds (84 kg).

After retiring as an active player, he worked as a minor league coach, manager and roving batting instructor for the Orioles, Yankees, Milwaukee Brewers, Arizona Diamondbacks and Los Angeles Dodgers, and came to the Giants in 2005. Mariano spent seven years as the Giants' minor league batting coordinator before his appointment as manager of the Fresno Grizzlies in 2012. Mariano spent three years as skipper of the Grizzlies, the Giants' former top affiliate. He moved to Sacramento when San Francisco took over as the River Cats' parent team from its former sponsor, the Oakland Athletics.

He also has managed the Class A Stockton Ports (1994) and Vero Beach Dodgers (2001) and the Triple-A Tucson Toros (part of 1997).

Preceded by Tim Ireland	Tucson Toros manager 1997; June 22–September 1	Succeeded by Chris Speier
Preceded by Steve Decker	Fresno Grizzlies manager 2012–2014	Succeeded by Tony DeFrancesco
Preceded by Steve Scarsone	Sacramento River Cats manager 2015	Succeeded by José Alguacil
