= Danny Garcia (outfielder) =

American baseball player (born 1954)

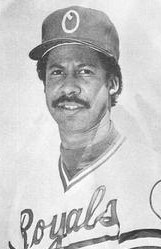
- Garcia in 1980
- Outfielder
- Born: April 29, 1954 (age 72); Brooklyn, New York, U.S.
- Batted: Left Threw: Left

MLB debut
- April 26, 1981, for the Kansas City Royals

Last MLB appearance
- May 26, 1981, for the Kansas City Royals

MLB statistics
- Batting average: .143
- Hits: 2
- Games played: 12
- Stats at Baseball Reference

Teams
- Kansas City Royals (1981)

Daniel R. Garcia (born April 29, 1954) is an American former professional baseball player, coach, scout, and executive. He played for the Kansas City Royals of Major League Baseball (MLB) during the 1981 season.

== Career ==
Garcia is a Cuban-American raised in Queens, New York, Garcia studied cognitive behavioral psychology at Baruch College. He was a bat boy for the 1973 National League Champion New York Mets and a former member of the 1974 National Baseball Congress Champion Alaska Goldpanners baseball team.

The Kansas City Royals selected Garcia in the 11th round of the 1975 Major League Baseball draft. He played in the minor leagues for seven seasons before reaching the major leagues in 1981. In 862 minor league games compiled 862 hits, a .292 batting average with 200 stolen bases. His best season occurred in 1980 with the Triple-A Omaha Royals batting .320, which was good for fourth place in the American Association. In 1981 he won a batting title in winter ball for the Leones del Caracas, of the Venezuelan Professional Baseball League. During the spring of the 1982 season, he tied a Mexican League record with 10 consecutive hits while hitting .424 for the Tigres Capitalinos. He retired after the 1982 season hitting .378 for the Double-A Buffalo Bisons.

Later in his career, Danny went to Australia, as a player/hitting coach with the Brisbane Bandits of the Australian Baseball League. When his playing career ended, he worked as the minor league hitting coach for the Texas League Champion Wichita Wranglers, the San Diego Padres AA affiliate in 1992. He served as an MLB and International Scout for the Milwaukee Brewers 1993 -1999. Special Assistant to the GM, Baltimore Orioles 2000 - 2003.
