= Logan Darnell =

American baseball player (born 1989)

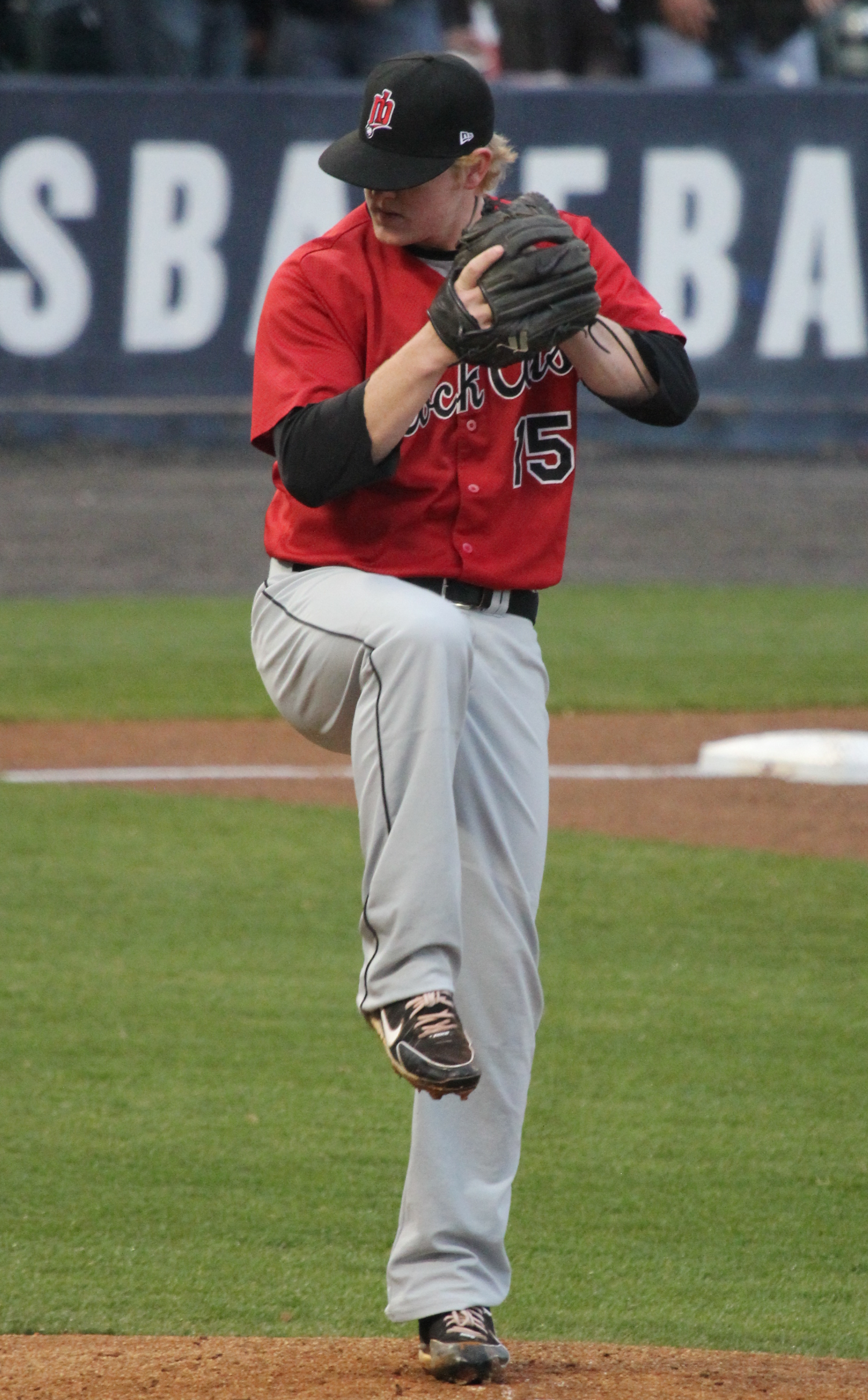
- Darnell with the New Britain Rock Cats in 2013
- Pitcher
- Born: February 2, 1989 (age 37); Joelton, Tennessee, U.S.
- Batted: Left Threw: Left

Professional debut
- MLB: May 6, 2014, for the Minnesota Twins
- CPBL: May 24, 2020, for the Uni-President Lions

Last appearance
- MLB: September 21, 2014, for the Minnesota Twins
- CPBL: July 14, 2020, for the Uni-President Lions

MLB statistics
- Win–loss record: 0–2
- Earned run average: 7.13
- Strikeouts: 22

CPBL statistics
- Win–loss record: 2–2
- Earned run average: 8.01
- Strikeouts: 36
- Stats at Baseball Reference

Teams
- Minnesota Twins (2014); Uni-President Lions (2020)

Logan Reece Darnell (born February 2, 1989) is an American former professional baseball pitcher. He made his Major League Baseball (MLB) debut with the Minnesota Twins in 2014 and also played in the Chinese Professional Baseball League (CPBL) for the Uni-President Lions. He played college baseball at the University of Kentucky.

== Career ==
=== Minnesota Twins ===
Darnell was drafted by the Minnesota Twins in the sixth round, with the 195th overall selection, of the 2010 Major League Baseball draft. He made his professional debut with the rookie-level Elizabethton Twins. Darnell split the 2011 season between the Single-A Beloit Snappers, High-A Fort Myers Miracle, and Double-A New Britain Rock Cats. In 26 starts split between the three affiliates, he accumulated an 11-6 record and 4.37 ERA with 90 strikeouts across 150 1/3 innings pitched.

Darnell returned to New Britain for the 2012 campaign, compiling an 11-12 record and 5.08 ERA with 98 strikeouts in 156 innings pitched across 28 starts. In 2013, he made 27 appearances (including 26 starts) split between New Britain and the Triple-A Rochester Red Wings, posting a cumulative 10-10 record and 3.22 ERA with 120 strikeouts across 153 2/3 innings pitched.

On November 20, 2013, the Twins added Darnell to their 40-man roster to protect him from the Rule 5 draft. He was promoted to the majors for the first time on May 2, 2014. In 7 games (4 starts) during his rookie campaign, Darnell logged an 0–2 record and 7.13 ERA with 22 strikeouts across 24 innings.

Darnell spent the entirety of the 2015 season with Triple–A Rochester, posting a 5–1 record and 2.78 ERA with 66 strikeouts over 35 appearances. On January 22, 2016, Darnell was designated for assignment following the waiver claim of Mike Strong. He cleared waivers and was sent outright to Triple–A Rochester on January 28. Darnell spent the 2016 campaign with Rochester, compiling an 8–8 record and 3.53 ERA with 53 strikeouts across 109 2/3 innings pitched. He elected free agency following the season on November 7, 2016.

=== Somerset Patriots ===
On March 15, 2017, Darnell signed with the Somerset Patriots of the Atlantic League of Professional Baseball.

On May 9, 2017, Darnell signed a minor league contract with the Los Angeles Dodgers. He did not appear in any games in the Dodgers farm system before he was released by the organization on June 1.

On June 1, 2017, Darnell re–signed with the Patriots.

=== Tampa Bay Rays ===
On July 5, 2017, Darnell signed a minor league deal with the Tampa Bay Rays. Darnell started 12 games for the Double–A Montgomery Biscuits, registering a 3.98 ERA with 54 strikeouts in 74 2/3 innings pitched. He elected free agency following the season on November 6.

=== Washington Nationals ===
On January 3, 2018, Darnell signed a minor league contract with the Washington Nationals. He spent the year with the Double–A Harrisburg Senators, also making two starts for the Triple–A Syracuse Chiefs. In 24 games (19 starts) for Harrisburg, Darnell compiled an 8–6 record and 3.91 ERA with 82 strikeouts across 112 2/3 innings pitched. He elected free agency following the season on November 2.

=== Somerset Patriots (third stint) ===
On February 21, 2019, Darnell signed with the Somerset Patriots of the Atlantic League of Professional Baseball. Darnell made six appearances (three starts) for the Patriots, posting a 1-1 record and 5.02 ERA with 14 strikeouts across 14 1/3 innings pitched.

=== Sultanes de Monterrey ===
On July 4, 2019, Darnell's contract was purchased by the Sultanes de Monterrey of the Mexican League. He made 11 appearances (eight starts) down the stretch for Monterrey, compiling a 5-5 record and 5.17 ERA with 30 strikeouts and one save over 47 innings of work. Darnell was released by the Sultanes on February 18, 2020.

=== Uni-President Lions ===
On April 29, 2020, Darnell signed with the Uni-President Lions of the Chinese Professional Baseball League (CPBL). He made 10 appearances (including seven starts) for the Lions, registering a 2-2 record and 8.01 ERA with 36 strikeouts across 39 1/3 innings pitched. On July 5, the Lions announced that they would be parting ways with Darnell, who would be returning to the United States for the birth of his child.

== International career ==
After the 2020 season, he played for Cardenales de Lara of the Liga Venezolana de Béisbol Profesional (LVMP). He has also played for Venezuela in the 2021 Caribbean Series.
