= Reggie Otero =

Cuban baseball player (1915–1988)

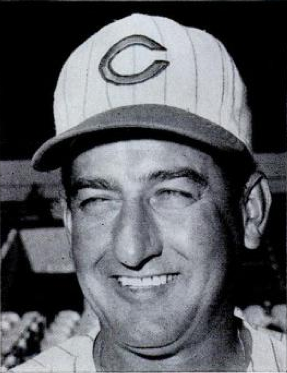
- Otero in 1963
- First baseman
- Born: September 7, 1915; Havana, Cuba
- Died: October 21, 1988 (aged 73); Hialeah, Florida, U.S.
- Batted: Left Threw: Right

MLB debut
- September 2, 1945, for the Chicago Cubs

Last MLB appearance
- September 29, 1945, for the Chicago Cubs

MLB statistics
- Batting average: .391
- Home runs: 0
- Runs batted in: 5
- Stats at Baseball Reference

Teams
- Chicago Cubs (1945)

Member of the Venezuelan

Baseball Hall of Fame
- Induction: 2009

Regino José Otero Gómez (September 7, 1915 – October 21, 1988) was a Cuban professional baseball player who had a long career in the minor leagues in the United States (1936–1953), and played briefly with the Chicago Cubs of Major League Baseball in 1945. He also played 13 years in the Cuban Professional League.

A left-handed batting first baseman, he threw right-handed, and was listed as 6 feet (1.8 m) tall and 165 pounds (75 kg). After his playing career ended, he managed in the U.S., Cuba, Mexico and Venezuela, spent eight years (1959–1666) as a coach in the U.S. major leagues, then worked as a scout for two MLB clubs for more than a decade.

== Playing career ==
Born in Havana, Otero made his organized baseball debut in 1936 with the York White Roses/Trenton Senators club of the New York–Pennsylvania League, where he hit .243 with no home runs and 22 runs batted in. He also played for the International League's Albany Senators that year, but hit only .111. The following year he returned to the Senators but still had trouble, hitting .136 with 0 HR and 3 RBI. In 1938 he moved south to the St. Augustine Saints (Florida State League). There he hit .308, still with 0 HR, but with 52 RBI.

Otero played for the Greenville Spinners in 1939 and 1940. In his two seasons in the Sally League he hit .325-2-57 and then .315-1-50. He moved back north in 1941, when he played for the Springfield Nationals of the Eastern League and hit .223-0-24. Otero played for the Springfield club's farm team, the Utica Braves of the Can-Am League, in 1942, where he led the league in batting with a .364 average, 2 HR and 101 RBI. Inactive in 1943, Otero moved west in 1944, playing for the Los Angeles Angels of the Pacific Coast League. At the end of the 1945 season he was called up to the Chicago Cubs, after hitting .344 with 23 RBI, following a .306-0-54 season.

Otero appeared in 14 games for the Cubs, making his debut on September 2, 1945. He had 9 hits in 23 at-bats, good for a .391 average with 5 RBI. This was his only major league experience. He returned to the Angels for the 1946 and 1947 seasons. Otero could not continue to put up those numbers and hit only .273-1-46, and then .231-0-7 in the following year. After the 1947 season, he joined the Portsmouth Cubs of the Piedmont League, where he would play for the next five years, also serving as manager in 1951–52. In the league Otero hit over .300 four times with a high of .353, and had 4 home runs and 312 RBI. He joined the Springfield Cubs (International League) in 1953 and hit .171-0-4 before retiring from the minor leagues.

In his homeland, Otero played in 480 games in the Cuban Professional League for thirteen years from 1936 to 1953. He began his career with the Club Acción Republicana before joining Habana (1936–37), Santa Clara (1939–40), Cienfuegos and Almendares (1945–46) and then the Havana Reds of the Cuban National Federation before returning to Cienfuegos, where he played for seven years from 1947 to 1953. Otero hit .242 in the Cuban league with 499 hits in 2068 at-bats with 177 RBI.

== Manager, coach and scout ==
After his playing career ended, Otero managed the Havana Sugar Kings from 1954 through mid-1956. He also managed in the Cuban league and the Mexican League, but gained the most notoriety in the Venezuelan League. There he led the Industriales de Valencia to three titles (1955–56, 1957–58, 1958–59) and the Leones del Caracas to four titles (1961–62, 1963–64, 1966–67, 1967–68). His seven championships are the most in the league's history.

In Major League Baseball, he served as a coach for the Cincinnati Reds (1959–1965) and Cleveland Indians (1966). In 1967, he became a scout, working for Cleveland and the Los Angeles Dodgers into the 1980s.

Otero died of a heart attack in Hialeah, Florida, on October 21, 1988.

== See also ==
- List of Major League Baseball players from Cuba

Sporting positions
Preceded by Jimmy Dykes	Cincinnati Reds third base coach 1959–1964	Succeeded by Frank Oceak
Preceded by Dick Sisler	Cincinnati Reds first base coach 1965	Succeeded by Roy Sievers
Preceded by Solly Hemus	Cleveland Indians first base coach 1966	Succeeded by Pat Mullin
