= Robert Pérez (baseball) =

Venezuelan baseball player (born 1969)

Caciques de Distrito
- Outfielder / Manager
- Born: June 4, 1969 (age 57); Ciudad Bolívar, Venezuela
- Batted: Right Threw: Right

Professional debut
- MLB: July 20, 1994, for the Toronto Blue Jays
- NPB: October 9, 1999, for the Orix BlueWave

Last appearance
- NPB: April 3, 1999, for the Orix BlueWave
- MLB: October 7, 2001, for the Milwaukee Brewers

MLB statistics
- Batting average: .254
- Home runs: 8
- Runs batted in: 44

NPB statistics
- Batting average: .253
- Home runs: 2
- Runs batted in: 23

KBO statistics
- Batting average: .306
- Home runs: 35
- Runs batted in: 144
- Stats at Baseball Reference

Teams
- Toronto Blue Jays (1994–1997); Seattle Mariners (1998); Montreal Expos (1998); Orix BlueWave (1999); New York Yankees (2001); Milwaukee Brewers (2001); Lotte Giants (2003–2004, 2007)

Member of the Venezuelan

Baseball Hall of Fame
- Induction: 2021
- Vote: 86%
- Election method: Contemporary Committee

Robert Alexander Pérez Jiménez (born June 4, 1969) is a Venezuelan former professional baseball outfielder who played for the Toronto Blue Jays, Seattle Mariners, Montreal Expos, New York Yankees and Milwaukee Brewers of Major League Baseball (MLB) in parts of six seasons spanning 1994–2001. Listed at 6' 3", 205 lb., he batted and threw right handed. Pérez is the manager of the Caciques de Distrito of the Venezuelan Major League.

== Career ==
Born in Ciudad Bolívar, Pérez started his professional baseball career in the Venezuelan League as a 19-year-old rookie during the 1988–1989 season. He was signed by the Blue Jays organization as an amateur free agent in 1989.

In a six-season career, Pérez posted a batting average of .254 (126-for-497) with eight home runs and 74 runs batted in in 221 games, including 49 runs, 19 doubles, one triple and three stolen bases.

In 2007 and 2008 Pérez played in the Mexican League, batting over .300 both years. He also spent time in Nippon Professional Baseball (NPB) and Korea Baseball Organization (KBO) while playing for the Orix BlueWave (1999) and the Lotte Giants (2003–2004, 2007), respectively, and played with the Novara United of the Italian Baseball League during the 2011 season. In 2003, he tried to make a comeback to the majors by signing a minor league deal with the Seattle Mariners, was released at the end of spring training.

Besides, Pérez spent his entire 27-season career in the Venezuelan League with the Cardenales de Lara club between the 1989–90 and 2014-15 tournaments to become a living legend in his country, where he is nicknamed El Hombre Historia (The History Man). Such a nickname comes from the fact he set several all-time records in Venezuelan baseball history, including for the most home runs (125), RBIs (738), doubles (222) extra-base hits (382) and game appearances (1,300).

== See also ==
- List of Major League Baseball players from Venezuela
