= Leones del Caracas =

Venezuelan baseball team

Logo
Cap insignia

Information
- League: Venezuelan Professional Baseball League
- Location: Caracas, Venezuela
- Ballpark: Estadio Monumental de Caracas Simón Bolívar
- Founded: May 7, 1942
- Caribbean Series championships: 2 (1982, 2006)
- Interamerican Series championships: 1 (1950)
- League championships: 21 (1947–48, 1948–49, 1951–52, 1952–53, 1956–57, 1961–62, 1963–64, 1966–67, 1967–68, 1972–73, 1977–78, 1979–80, 1980–81, 1981–82, 1986–87, 1987–88, 1989–90, 1994–95, 2005–06, 2009–10, 2022–23)
- Former name: Cerveceria Caracas

Current uniforms
Home	Away

The Caracas Base Ball Club C.A., better known by its commercial name as the Leones del Caracas, is a professional baseball team of the Venezuelan Professional Baseball League (LVPB). The owner and sole shareholder of the sports club is Ricardo Cisneros, president of Ateneas Sports Holding.

Its name comes from the official name of the city of Caracas—Santiago de León de Caracas—which Diego de Losada assigned to it when it was founded in 1567. Consequently, a lion appears as a symbol on the representative coat of arms of the city of Caracas.

Los Leones del Caracas is a very popular team in Venezuela, and is the team with the most titles (21), and has runners-up (17), played finals (34), played post-seasons (3&). Second highest win percentage in the LVBP in regular season: (D-D 2187-2100 51%), post-season: (D-D 206-178 55.0%), finals (D-D 97-78 55.4%).

The team's colors are dark blue and gold and the crest features a lion, a symbol of the city of Caracas since 1591.

== History ==
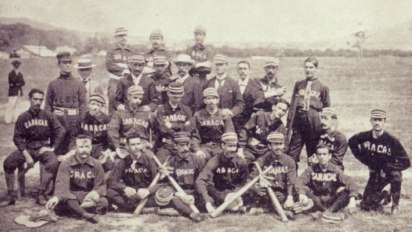
1895 Caracas Baseball Club.

Cervecería Caracas was founded in 1942, after Cervecería Princesa, an early team, was bought and transformed into Caracas. At first, the team played its home games at the old Estadio Cerveza Caracas, which was located in the capital city of Caracas. The team was founded by Martín Tovar Lange and managed by big leaguer Alejandro Carrasquel.

The Princesa team played its last game on May 7, 1942. Then, Caracas debuted four days later with a 7–3 victory over the Criollos (English: Creoles). The game was played in Puerto Cabello, a city on the north coast of Venezuela. Caracas faced its later nemesis, the Navegantes del Magallanes for the first time on December 27 of that year, winning this now historic game by a 3–0 score.

In its first stage, the team won two championship titles before moving to the Venezuelan Professional Baseball League in January 1946.

Since its inception, the Caracas team was characterized by having only Venezuelan players on their roster. The club changed its policy in 1950, after signing catcher Lester Fusselman and outfielder Maurice Mozzali, two St. Louis Cardinals prospects.

In 1952, the franchise was bought by the publicist and sport commentator Pablo Morales and christened Leones del Caracas as a new franchise. Since then, the team plays its home games at the Estadio Universitario in Caracas. Later, businessman Oscar Prieto Ortiz joined Morales as a legal partner.

Pete Rose was benched after a slump late in the 1964 MLB season, finishing with a .269 average, but continued to play winter ball in Venezuela with the Leones del Caracas team during the 1964–1965 season to improve his batting.

By 2001, the descendants of Morales and Prieto sold their shares to the Grupo Cisneros, giving it majority control of the team.

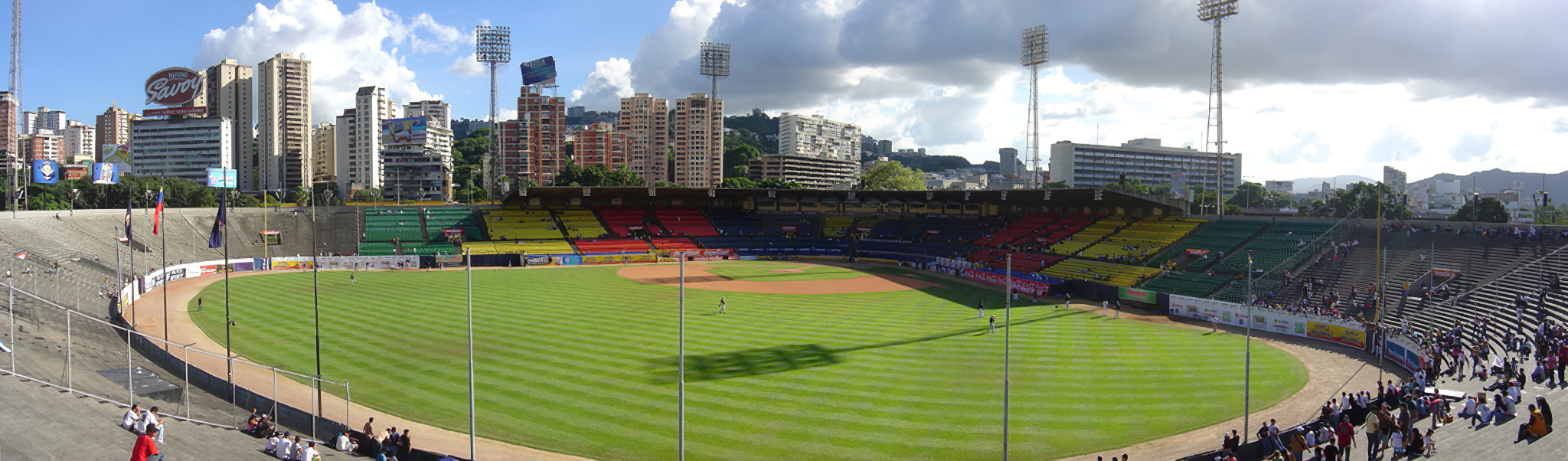
Panoramic view of the stadium.

Through 2024, the Caracas team has won 21 championship titles (3 as Cervecería Caracas and 18 as Leones del Caracas), more than any other team in Venezuelan Professional Baseball League history.

== Ballpark ==
The Estadio Universitario is a multi-use stadium located in Caracas, Venezuela. The stadium holds 22,690 people and was built in 1952.

This stadium forms part of the Central University of Venezuela campus and was designed by architect Carlos Raúl Villanueva. It is considered a masterpiece of urban planning and was declared a World Heritage Site by the UNESCO in 2000. Caracas played in this stadium until the 2022–23 season. For the 2023–24 season the club moved to the brand new Monumental Stadium of Caracas Simón Bolívar.

== Attendances ==
In the 2015–16 season, the Leones del Caracas became the club with the highest average home attendance in the league, with an average of 10,845. The next season, the average attendance was 6,539. In the 2023–24 season, the Leones del Caracas drew an average home league attendance of 13,863.

== Championships ==
Season	Manager	Record	Series score	Runner-up
1947–48 ^{[a]}	José Antonio Casanova	25–14	—	Sabios de Vargas
1948–49 ^{[a]}	José Antonio Casanova	18–13	—	Navegantes del Magallanes
1951–52 ^{[a]}	José Antonio Casanova	41–15	—	Navegantes del Magallanes
1952–53	Martín Dihigo	32–25	—	Navegantes del Magallanes
1956–57	Clay Bryant	26–26	4–1	Industriales de Valencia
1961–62	Regino Otero	31–21	4–1	Indios de Oriente
1963–64	Regino Otero	26–24	4–3	Industriales de Valencia
1966–67	Regino Otero	32–29	3–2	Tiburones de La Guaira
1967–68	Regino Otero	37–23	—	Tigres de Aragua
1972–73	Oswaldo Virgil	37–33	4–1	Águilas del Zulia
1977–78	Felipe Rojas Alou	40–30	4–3	Águilas del Zulia
1979–80	Felipe Rojas Alou	46–23	4–1	Cardenales de Lara
1980–81	Jim Leyland / Alfonso Carrasquel	33–27	4–0	Cardenales de Lara
1981–82	Alfonso Carrasquel	33–33	4–1	Cardenales de Lara
1986–87	Bill Plummer	33–31	4–0	Tiburones de La Guaira
1987–88	Bill Robinson	33–27	4–2	Tigres de Aragua
1989–90	Phil Regan	32–38	4–3	Cardenales de Lara
1994–95	Phil Regan / Pompeyo Davalillo	33–27	4–2	Águilas del Zulia
2005–06	Carlos Subero	35–27	4–1	Tigres de Aragua
2009–10	Dave Hudgens	41–22	4–3	Navegantes del Magallanes
2022–23	José Alguacil	36–19	4–2	Tiburones de la Guaira
Total championships			21	

=== Notes ===
- ^{a} Won the title as Cervecería Caracas. The team changed owners and name in 1952, but the franchise official name, Caracas Base Ball Club, remained constant during all sale transactions in 1949, 1952 and 2001.

== Caribbean World Series titles ==
On February 9, 1982, the Leones earned Venezuela's third Caribbean World Series and the franchise's first, by defeating Dominican Republics's Leones del Escogido with a 3-1 score. The Leones ended the series with a record of 5 wins and 1 defeat. The Venezuelan team, with Alfonso Carrasquel at the helm, gained the championship title with a 5-1 record. Leones was led by catcher and Series MVP Baudilio Díaz (.412 BA, two home runs, five RBI, .500 OBP, .765 SLG), CF Tony Armas (.375, six RBI) and LF Luis Salazar (six runs, four stolen bases). The pitching staff was led by Luis Leal, who posted a 2-0 record with a 2.08 ERA and 10 strikeouts and a in 13.0 innings of work. Behind him were Bud Black (1-0, 1.29), Dennis Burtt (1-0, one save, seven SO in 10 2/3 innings) and Tom Dixon (nine scoreless innings in Game 7). Venezuela also featured 2B Steve Sax, SS Ron Gardenhire, 1B Danny Garcia, 3B Leonardo Hernández, pinch-hitter Andrés Galarraga and pitcher Joe Cowley, among others.

On February 7, 2006, the Leones earned Venezuela's first Caribbean World Series title in 16 years, by defeating the Tigres del Licey of the Dominican Republic with a 5-4 score in the last game; this left the Leones with a record of six wins and no defeats at the 2006 Caribbean Series, ahead of Licey's four wins and two defeats record. With the victory, the Leones won Venezuela's sixth Caribbean Series title, and the franchise's second after the 1982 Caribbean Series. This also marked the first time a Venezuelan team sweeps the Caribbean Series, a feat previously accomplished only by teams from Cuba (Almendares in 1949, Habana in 1952, and Cienfuegos in 1960), from Puerto Rico (Cangrejeros de Santurce in 1953 and 2000, and Senadores de San Juan in 1995) and from the Dominican Republic (Tigres del Licey in 1971, 1977 and 1991, and Águilas Cibaeñas in 1998).

== Retired numbers ==
1 Pompeyo Davalillo; SS; Retired	2 Víctor Davalillo; OF; Retired	6 Gonzalo Márquez; 1B; Retired	8 Urbano Lugo; P Retired	11; Luis Aparicio; SS; Retired	12; César Tovar; IF; Retired	17; Alfonso "Chico"; Carrasquel; SS; Retired	20; Antonio Armas; OF; Retired	25; Baudilio Díaz; C Retired

23; Omar; Vizquel; SS; Retired 2008	41; Andrés; Galarraga; 1B; Retired 2008

* Retired by VPBL

== Current roster ==
Leones del Caracas 2020-2021 Roster
Players		Coaches
Pitchers: 22 (Venezuela) Luis Amaya; 82 (Venezuela) Edwuin Bencomo; 74 (Venezuela) Yoimer Camacho; 61 (Venezuela) Francisco Carrillo; 40 (Venezuela) Felix Carvallo; -- (Venezuela) Anthony Castro; 77 (Venezuela) Alejandro Chacín; 68 (Venezuela) Jervic Chávez; 81 (Venezuela) Luis Chirinos; 71 (Venezuela) Franklin Dacosta; 52 (Venezuela) Edgmer Escalona; 00 (Venezuela) Juan Gonzalez; 39 (Venezuela) Norwith Gudino; 83 (Venezuela) Anjul Hernandez; -- (Venezuela) Wilkel Hernandez; 65 (Dominican Republic) Alsis Herrera; 36 (Venezuela) Ronald Herrera; 75 (Venezuela) Daniel Hurtado; -- (Venezuela) Jhaner Linares; 67 (Venezuela) Frank López; 86 (Mexico) Jaime Lugo; 34 (Venezuela) Loiger Padrón; 63 (Venezuela) Carlos Quevedo; 87 (Dominican Republic) Eduard Reyes; 79 (Venezuela) Jesus Rodriguez; 55 (Venezuela) Miguel Socolovich; -- (Venezuela) Albert Suárez; 76 (Venezuela) José Torres; 48 (Venezuela) Jesus Zambrano; updated on 11 May 2021	Catchers: 85 (Venezuela) Gabriel Bracamonte; -- (Venezuela) Albert Cordero; 78 (Venezuela) Alfredo González; 89 (Venezuela) Jhonny Pereda; 58 (Venezuela) Keibert Ruiz; Infielders: 28 (Venezuela) Luis Alejandro Basabe; -- (Venezuela) Harold Castro; 05 (Venezuela) Ronny Cedeño; 66 (Dominican Republic) Andretty Cordero; 37 (Venezuela) Aldrem Corredor; 27 (Venezuela) Leonardo Ferrini; 04 (Venezuela) Jose Garcia; 15 (Venezuela) Jesús Guzmán; 07 (Venezuela) Wilfredo Tovar; Outfielders: 32 (Venezuela) Romer Cuadrado; 62 (Venezuela) Ericson Leonora; 73 (Venezuela) Alexander Palma; 29 (Venezuela) Eduard Pinto; -- (Venezuela) Víctor Reyes; 09 (Venezuela) José Rondón; 22 (Venezuela) Jesus Solorzano	Manager: -- (Venezuela) José Alguacil; Coaches: -- (Venezuela) Wilson Álvarez (Pitching); -- (Venezuela) Ramón Castro (Hitting); -- (Nicaragua) Juan Muñoz (First Base); -- (Venezuela) Lipso Nava (Bench); -- (Venezuela) Oscar Salazar (Third Base); -- (Venezuela) Mauro Zárate (Bullpen); (Coaching staff for 2021-22 season)

== See also ==
- 1953 Caribbean Series
- 1957 Caribbean Series
- 1980 Caribbean Series
- 1982 Caribbean Series
- 2006 Caribbean Series
