= Dale Polley =

American baseball player (born 1965)

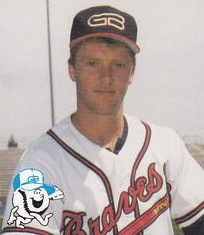
- Polley in 1988
- Pitcher
- Born: August 9, 1964 (age 61); Georgetown, Kentucky, U.S.
- Batted: Right Threw: Left

MLB debut
- June 23, 1996, for the New York Yankees

Last MLB appearance
- September 29, 1996, for the New York Yankees

MLB statistics
- Win–loss record: 1–3
- Earned run average: 7.89
- Strikeouts: 14
- Stats at Baseball Reference

Teams
- New York Yankees (1996)

Ezra Dale Polley (born August 9, 1964) is an American former Major League Baseball pitcher for the New York Yankees. He bats right-handed and throws left-handed.

He was signed by the Atlanta Braves as an amateur free agent in 1987. He played only in 1996 with the Yankees. Polley had a 1–3 record in 32 games, with a 7.89 ERA. Polley attended Kentucky State University.
