= José Alguacil =

Venezuelan baseball player and coach (born 1972)

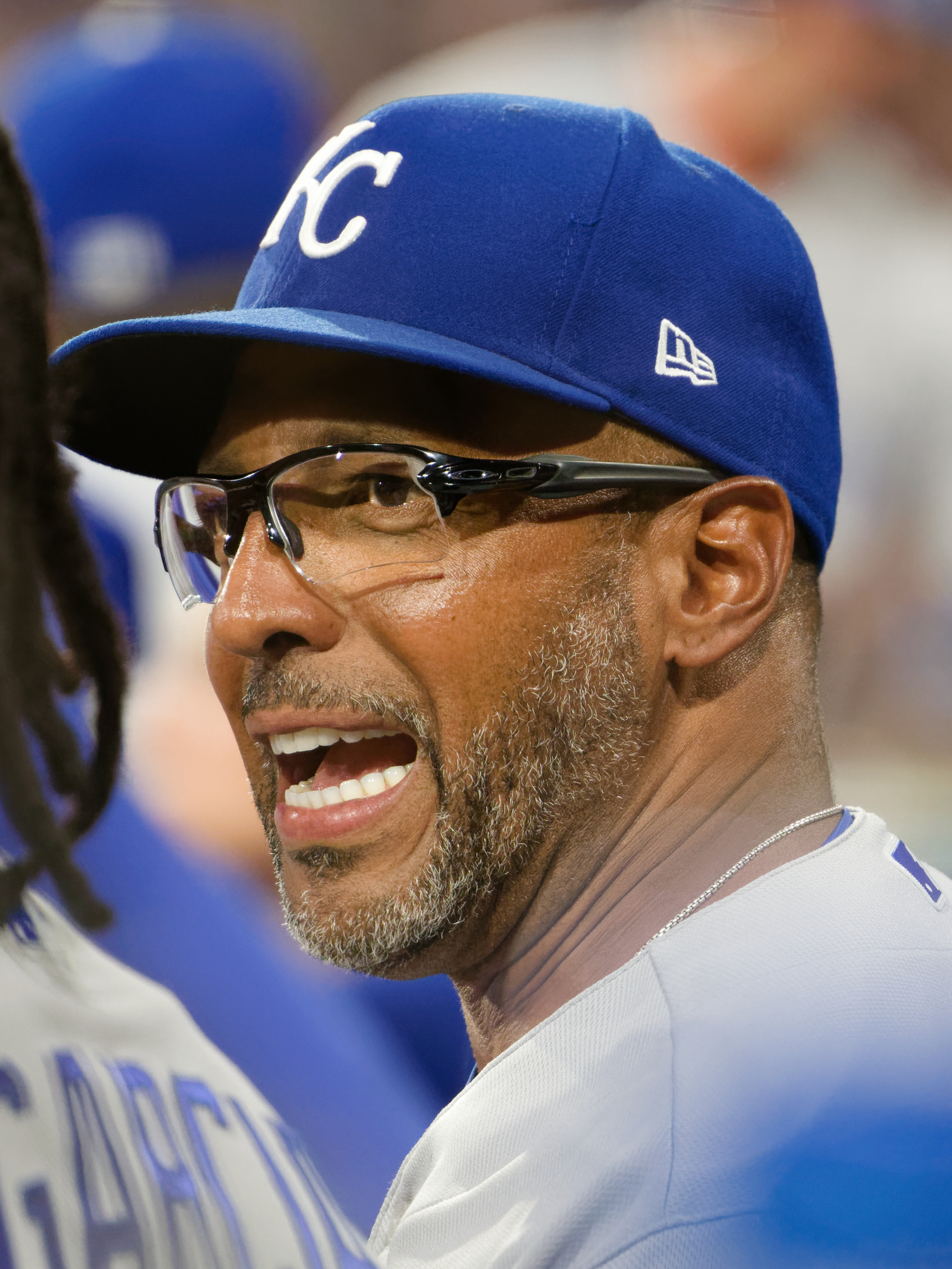
- Alguacil with the Royals in 2023

Kansas City Royals – No. 68
- Coach
- Born: August 9, 1972 (age 53); Caracas, Venezuela
- Bats: Left Throws: Right
- Stats at Baseball Reference

Teams
- As coach: San Francisco Giants (2017–2019); Kansas City Royals (2023–present)

José Luis Alguacil (born August 9, 1972) is a Venezuelan professional baseball coach and a former infielder and manager. He served as first base coach of the San Francisco Giants of Major League Baseball (MLB) for three seasons, after being named to the post on November 7, 2016.

== Biography ==
A native of Caracas, he played minor league baseball in the Giants' and Chicago White Sox' organizations, as well as in the independent leagues, from 1993 to 2001. He batted .245 in 808 professional games. Alguacil was listed as 6 feet 2 inches (1.88 m) tall and 200 pounds (91 kg). He batted left-handed and threw right-handed.

Alguacil began his managing career in the Short Season New York–Penn League with the 2004 Vermont Expos, spending three years with the club. In 2007, he rejoined the Giants as a roving minor league infield instructor, and worked for eight years (through 2014) in that post before returning to managing. He played a role in the development of fellow Venezuelan Pablo Sandoval as Sandoval rose through the Giants' system.

He then piloted the Richmond Flying Squirrels in 2015 and Sacramento River Cats in 2016, compiling a record of 141–143 (.490).

Alguacil managed the Venezuela national baseball team at the qualifiers for the 2020 Summer Olympics, replacing Carlos Subero in the role.

On December 1, 2022, the Kansas City Royals hired Alguacil as their infield coach for the 2023 season.

Preceded by Russ Morman	Richmond Flying Squirrels manager 2015	Succeeded by Miguel Ojeda
Preceded by Bob Mariano	Sacramento River Cats manager 2016	Succeeded by Dave Brundage
Preceded by Bill Hayes	San Francisco Giants first base coach 2017-2019	Succeeded by TBA
