= Tom Dixon (pitcher) =

American baseball player (born 1955)

- Pitcher
- Born: April 23, 1955 (age 69); Orlando, Florida, U.S.
- Batted: Right Threw: Right

MLB debut
- July 30, 1977, for the Houston Astros

Last MLB appearance
- September 23, 1983, for the Montreal Expos

MLB statistics
- Win–loss record: 9–14
- Earned run average: 4.33
- Strikeouts: 94
- Stats at Baseball Reference

Teams
- Houston Astros (1977–1979); Montreal Expos (1983)

Thomas Earl Dixon (born April 23, 1955) is a former Major League Baseball pitcher from 1977 to 1983 for the Houston Astros and Montreal Expos.
