= Phil Stephenson =

American baseball player (born 1960)

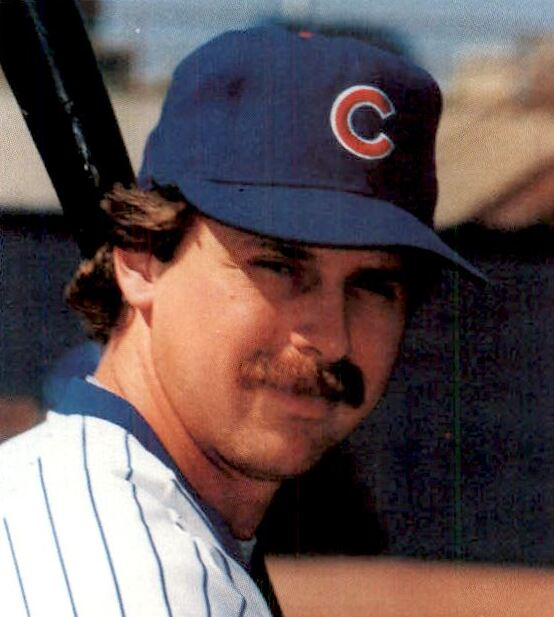
- Stephenson c. 1987
- First baseman
- Born: September 19, 1960 (age 65); Guthrie, Oklahoma, U.S.
- Batted: Left Threw: Left

MLB debut
- April 5, 1989, for the Chicago Cubs

Last MLB appearance
- October 4, 1992, for the San Diego Padres

MLB statistics
- Batting average: .201
- Home runs: 6
- Runs batted in: 29
- Stats at Baseball Reference

Teams
- Chicago Cubs (1989); San Diego Padres (1989–1992)

Member of the National College

Baseball Hall of Fame
- Induction: 2007

Phillip Raymond Stephenson (born September 19, 1960) is an American former Major League Baseball first baseman. He played all or parts of four seasons in the majors, from 1989 until 1992.

== Amateur career ==
While playing for the Shockers of Wichita State University under his older brother, Gene, Phil hit safely in what was then the longest hitting streak in Division I history, 47 straight games in 1981. His record was broken by Oklahoma State's Robin Ventura, who hit safely in 58 straight games in 1987. He was also the victim of one of the most famous plays in College World Series history - The Grand Illusion play by Miami in 1982.

== Professional career ==
=== Playing ===
Stephenson was originally drafted in the 3rd round of the 1983 Major League Baseball draft by the Oakland Athletics. He was traded to the Chicago Cubs before the 1986 season, and made his major league debut with them in 1989. That September, he was traded to the San Diego Padres, and finished his major league career with them in 1992. He played two more seasons of minor league baseball in the Kansas City Royals and St. Louis Cardinals organizations before retiring.

Stephenson was a replacement player during the 1995 players strike, playing for the Cubs during spring training.

=== Managerial and coaching ===
Stephenson managed in the minor leagues for two seasons in the mid-1990s, winning a league championship with the independent Abilene Prairie Dogs in 1996. He was the head baseball coach for Dodge City Community College. He has now joined the on-air lineup at KGSO, a sports talk radio station in Wichita, hosting a show from 9 a.m. until 11 a.m.

== Sources ==
- Career statistics from Baseball Reference · Baseball Reference (Minors) · Retrosheet · Baseball Almanac
