= Dennis Burtt =

American baseball player (born 1957)

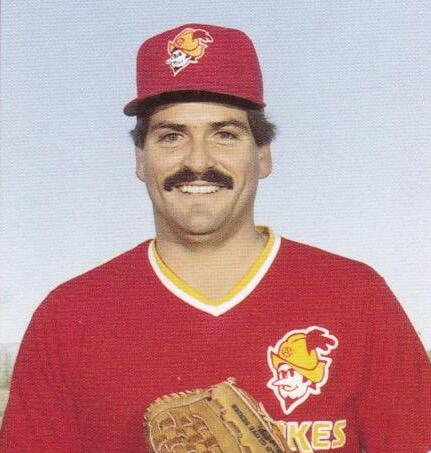
- Burtt with the Albuquerque Dukes c. 1987
- Pitcher
- Born: November 29, 1957 (age 68); San Diego, California, U.S.
- Batted: Right Threw: Right

MLB debut
- September 4, 1985, for the Minnesota Twins

Last MLB appearance
- April 15, 1986, for the Minnesota Twins

MLB statistics
- Win–loss record: 2–2
- Earned run average: 5.64
- Strikeouts: 10
- Stats at Baseball Reference

Teams
- Minnesota Twins (1985–1986)

Dennis Allen Burtt (born November 29, 1957) is an American former Major League Baseball pitcher who played for the Minnesota Twins in 1985 and 1986.

Burtt attended Villa Park High School where he was teammates on the school's baseball team with Kevin Costner.

Burtt served as the pitching coach for the New Britain Red Sox of the Eastern League in 1993 and 1994.
