= Tom Evans (baseball) =

American baseball player

- Third baseman
- Born: July 9, 1974 (age 51); Kirkland, Washington, U.S.
- Batted: Right Threw: Right

MLB debut
- September 2, 1997, for the Toronto Blue Jays

Last MLB appearance
- May 10, 2000, for the Texas Rangers

MLB statistics
- Batting average: .255
- Home runs: 1
- Runs batted in: 7

NPB statistics
- Batting average: .249
- Home runs: 17
- Runs batted in: 59
- Stats at Baseball Reference

Teams
- Toronto Blue Jays (1997–1998); Texas Rangers (2000); Hanshin Tigers (2001–2002); Seibu Lions (2002)

Thomas John Evans (born July 9, 1974) is a former professional third baseman. Between 1997 and 2000, Evans played for the Toronto Blue Jays (1997–98) and Texas Rangers (2000). in Major League Baseball. He batted and threw right-handed.

== Career ==
In a three-season career, Evans posted a .255 batting average with one home run and seven RBI in 42 games played. After his major league career, Evans played two seasons in Japan for the Hanshin Tigers and the Seibu Lions. He also played in the LVBP in Venezuela with the Cardenales de Lara. In 2005, while playing for the Altoona Curve in the Pittsburgh Pirates organization, Evans received a 15-game suspension for violating Major League Baseball's minor-league drug treatment and prevention program.
