= Ernesto Mejía (baseball) =

Venezuelan baseball player (born 1985)

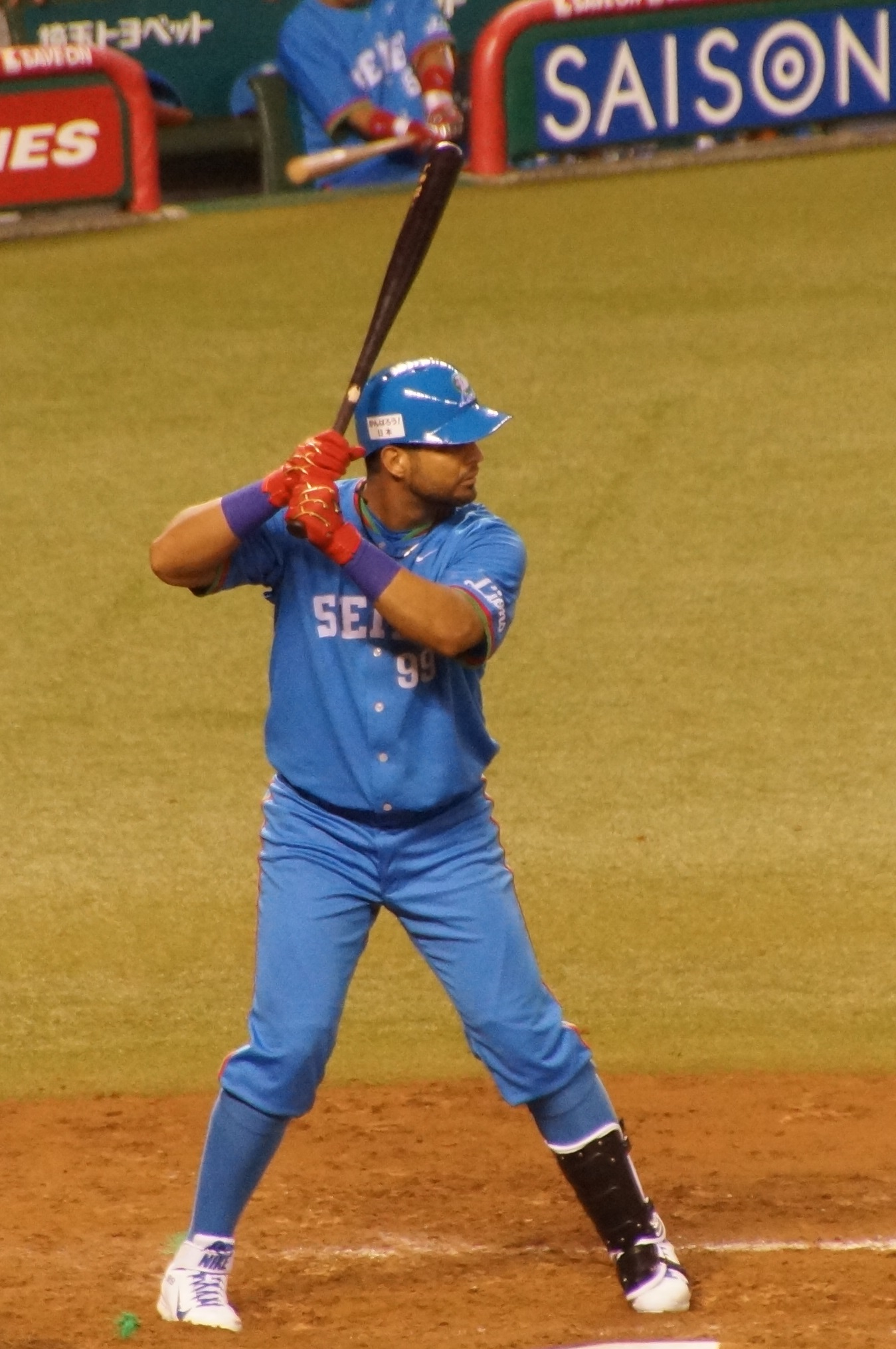
- Mejia with the Saitama Seibu Lions
- First baseman
- Born: December 2, 1985 (age 40); Guanare, Venezuela
- Batted: Right Threw: Right

NPB debut
- May 15, 2014, for the Saitama Seibu Lions

Last NPB appearance
- June 26, 2021, for the Saitama Seibu Lions

NPB statistics
- Batting average: .242
- Home runs: 142
- Runs batted in: 406
- Stats at Baseball Reference

Teams
- Saitama Seibu Lions (2014–2021)

Ernesto Antonio Mejía Alvarado [meh-HEE-ah] (born December 2, 1985) is a Venezuelan former professional baseball first baseman. Listed at 6' 5", 245 lb., he bats and throws right handed. He has previously played in Nippon Professional Baseball (NPB) for the Saitama Seibu Lions.

== Career ==
=== Atlanta Braves ===
Mejía was signed by the Atlanta Braves as a non-drafted free agent on July 8, 2002, and started his minor league career with the GCL Braves rookie team in 2005. In 2006, Mejía played for the rookie ball Danville Braves, slashing .296/.372/.473 with 4 home runs and 25 RBI. He split the 2007 season between Danville and the Single-A Rome Braves, hitting .321/.357/.533 with 9 home runs and 48 RBI between the two teams. He spent the 2008 season in High-A with the Myrtle Beach Pelicans, batting .274/.324/.505 with career-highs in home runs (21) and RBI (93). He split the 2009 season between the Double-A Mississippi Braves, the rookie ball GCL Braves, and Myrtle Beach, accumulating a .256/.331/.421 batting line to go along with 4 home runs and 17 RBI. On November 9, 2009, Mejía elected free agency.

=== Kansas City Royals ===
On December 11, 2009, Mejía signed a minor league contract with the Kansas City Royals organization that included an invitation to Spring Training. He did not make the club out of spring and was assigned to the Double-A Northwest Arkansas Naturals. Mejía split the year between the Naturals and the High-A Wilmington Blue Rocks, posting a .276/.337/.469 batting line with 16 home runs and 69 RBI. On November 6, 2010, he elected free agency.

=== Atlanta Braves (second stint) ===
On December 13, 2010, Mejía signed a minor league deal to return to the Atlanta Braves organization. He spent the 2011 season with Double-A Mississippi, slashing .297/.375/.531 with career-highs in home runs (26) and RBI (99). In 2012, Mejía reached Triple-A for the first time with the Gwinnett Braves, and led the circuit in RBI (92), hits (150) and total bases (256), was second both in SLG (.517) and at-bats (489), and tied for second in home runs (24), ending third in extra-bases (57), fourth in OPS (.858), fifth in runs (72) and eight in batting average (.298), while tying for sixth in both doubles (32) and games played (126). Mejía earned the International League Rookie of the Year distinction as well as the Postseason All-Star team. The All-Star nod is his sixth All-Star selection. He also became the third consecutive Gwinnett Braves player to claim the award for the league's top rookie, joining Freddie Freeman (2010) and Julio Teherán (2011).

On November 2, 2012, Mejía was selected to the Braves' 40-man roster. He spent the entire 2013 season in Gwinnett, posting a batting line of .249/.323/.497 to go along with 28 home runs and 83 RBI. He was named an International League All-Star for the 2013 season. Mejía began the 2014 season with Gwinnett, but was released on April 26, 2014, after reaching an agreement to play with a team in Nippon Professional Baseball.

=== Saitama Seibu Lions ===
After his release from the Braves, Mejía signed with the Saitama Seibu Lions of Nippon Professional Baseball. Mejía led NPB's Pacific League with 34 home runs in 2014, finishing in a tie for the top spot with Takeya Nakamura. In his first three seasons with the Lions through 2016, Mejia batted .257 overall with 96 home runs and 265 RBIs.

In 2017, Mejía slashed .241/.320/.458 with 19 home runs and 53 RBI in 113 games. He played in 82 games in 2018, batting .212/.282/.373 with 9 home runs and 21 RBI. In 2019, he hit .207/.273/.409 with 6 home runs and 31 RBI. On November 18, 2019, Mejía signed a 1-year contract extension to remain with the Lions. In 2020, he batted .207/.273/.409 with 11 home runs and 33 RBI in 74 games. Mejía played in 16 games for the team in 2021, collecting 8 hits in 36 at-bats (.143) with 1 home run and 3 RBI. On July 26, 2021, Mejía requested his release from the team so he could spend more time with his family.
