= Carlos Subero =

Venezuelan baseball player and coach

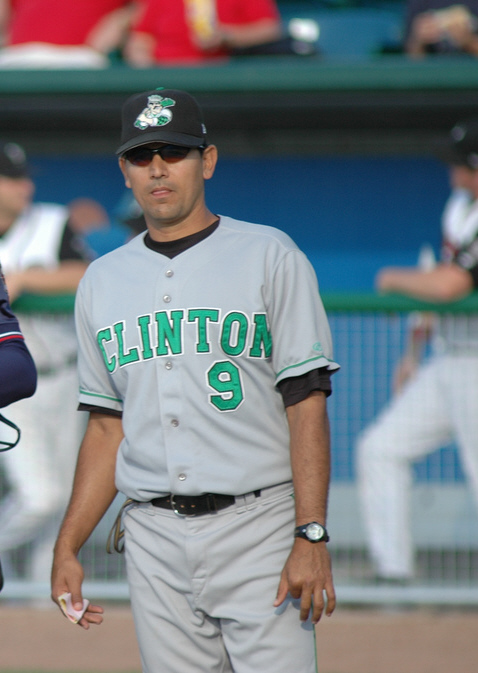
- Subero with the Clinton LumberKings in 2005

Hanwha Eagles
- Coach
- Born: June 15, 1972 (age 54); Caracas, Venezuela
- Stats at Baseball Reference

Teams
- Milwaukee Brewers (2016–2019); As manager: Hanwha Eagles (2021–2023)

Carlos Ingver Subero (born June 15, 1972) is a Venezuelan professional baseball coach and former player. He is currently manager for the Hanwha Eagles of the KBO League. Subero previously served as first base and infield coach for the Milwaukee Brewers.

== Career ==
As a player, he was signed as an undrafted free agent by the Kansas City Royals in 1990 and he spent five seasons in the minors with the Royals, Pittsburgh Pirates and Texas Rangers. His last season as a player was in 1997 with the independent Meridian Brakemen of the Big South League.

He became a minor league manager in 2001, guiding the Rangers rookie league team, the Gulf Coast Rangers for two seasons, their Class A affiliate, the Clinton LumberKings from 2003-2005 and the High A Bakersfield Blaze in 2007.

In 2008, he managed the Birmingham Barons ("AA") to the second best record in the Southern League and a spot in the playoffs. He was the manager of the Inland Empire 66ers of San Bernardino in 2009. For 2010-2012 he managed the AA Chattanooga Lookouts. For the 2013 season he managed the Rancho Cucamonga Quakes in the California League.

Subero was hired to manage the Milwaukee Brewers' AA Huntsville Stars in 2014. In 2015 Subero guided the 1st year franchise Biloxi Shuckers to the best record in the league with 79 wins, lost in the championship in game 5. Subero took the Southern League Manager of the Year honors.

In 2015, Subero managed the Surprise Saguaros of the Arizona Fall League to the best record in the circuit, losing the championship game to the Scottsdale Scorpions.

On December 7, 2015, the Brewers hired Subero as their first base and infield coach. Subero was fired by the Brewers after the 2019 season.

Subero managed the Venezuela national baseball team at the 2019 WBSC Premier12. Venezuela went 1–2 in the tournament, losing to Japan and Chinese Taipei while defeating Puerto Rico.

On November 27, 2020, Subero was announced as the new manager for the Hanwha Eagles of the KBO League.

== Personal ==
Subero is married and has three kids.
