= Cardenales de Lara =

Venezuelan baseball team

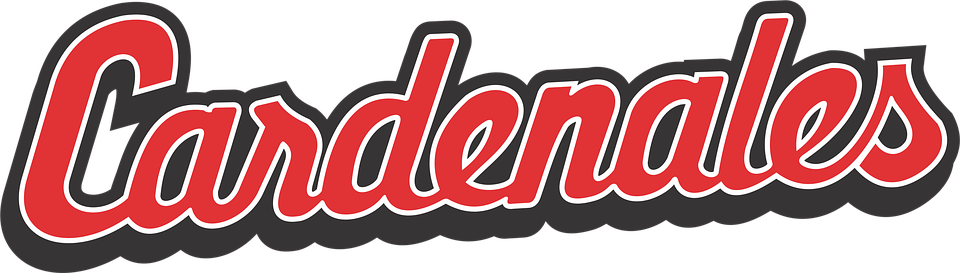
Logo
Cap insignia

Information
- League: Venezuelan Professional Baseball League (1964–present); Liga Occidental (1962–64)
- Location: Barquisimeto, Lara
- Ballpark: Estadio Antonio Herrera Gutiérrez
- Founded: 1942
- League championships: 7 (1990–91, 1997–98, 1998–99, 2000–01, 2018–19, 2019–20, 2024-25)

Current uniforms
Home	Away

Cardenales de Lara (English: Lara Cardinals) is a baseball team in the Venezuelan Professional Baseball League (LVBP). Founded in 1942 and based in Barquisimeto, the Cardenales have won seven domestic titles, including back-to-back in 1998 and 1999, 2019, 2020 and 2025.

== Current roster ==
Cardenales de Lara 2020-21 Roster
Players		Coaches
Pitchers: 74 (Venezuela) Daniel Álvarez; -- (Venezuela) Argenis Angulo; 50 (Venezuela) Leonel Aponte; -- (Venezuela) Wilser Barrios; 65 (Venezuela) Fabián Blanco; 34 (Venezuela) Vicente Campos; 56 (Venezuela) Leonel Campos; 44 (Venezuela) Maximo Castillo; 33 (Venezuela) Henry Centeno; -- (Venezuela) Jose Chavez; 95 (United States) Logan Darnell; -- (Venezuela) Alejandro Duran; 13 (Venezuela) Elvis Escobar; 61 (Venezuela) Yapson Gómez; 55 (Dominican Republic) Ricardo Gómez; 25 (Venezuela) Derian Gonzalez*; 36 (Venezuela) Néstor Molina; -- (Venezuela) Yonathan Ochoa; 71 (Venezuela) Luis Oviedo; 62 (Venezuela) Angelo Palumbo; 39 (Venezuela) Williams Pérez; 59 (Venezuela) Alejandro Requena; 69 (Venezuela) Raul Rivero; 80 (Venezuela) Hector Rodriguez; 52 (Venezuela) Wilking Rodríguez; 70 (Venezuela) Pedro Rodriguez; 82 (Venezuela) Jesús Sánchez; -- (Venezuela) Jesus Tona; updated on 8 June 2021	Catchers: -- (Venezuela) Axel Andueza; 37 (Venezuela) Francisco Arcia; 18 (Venezuela) Edward Barboza; 68 (Venezuela) Brhayan Campos; 06 (Venezuela) Josmar Cordero; 78 (Venezuela) Blayberg Diaz; 25 (Venezuela) Osman Marval; 33 (Venezuela) Gabriel Moreno; 56 (Venezuela) Yojhan Quevedo; -- (Venezuela) Gabriel Rodriguez; Infielders: -- (Venezuela) Diego Benitez; 66 (Venezuela) Jecksson Flores; -- (Venezuela) Wilson Garcia; 03 (Venezuela) César Hernández; 02 (Venezuela) César Izturis Jr.; -- (Venezuela) Luis Jiménez; -- (Venezuela) Yerry Landinez; 04 (Venezuela) Deiner López; -- (Venezuela) Bryant Mendez; 59 (Venezuela) Jose Mendez; 67 (Venezuela) Yonathan Mendoza; 19 (Venezuela) Jermaine Palacios; 18 (Venezuela) Oswald Peraza; -- (Venezuela) Juniel Querecuto; 24 (Venezuela) Carlos Rivero; -- (Venezuela) Anyesber Sivira; 10 (Venezuela) Ildemaro Vargas; Outfielders: 26 (Venezuela) Ezequiel Carrera; -- (Venezuela) Jair Casanova; 07 (Venezuela) Gorkys Hernández; 29 (Cuba) Yordanys Linares; 81 (Dominican Republic) César Puello; 77 (Venezuela) René Reyes; 43 (Venezuela) Joantgel Segovia; 31 (Venezuela) José Tábata	Manager: -- (Venezuela) Carlos Mendoza; Coaches: -- (Venezuela) Yhonny Almao (Bullpen Catcher); -- (Venezuela) Gerardo Casadiego (Pitching); -- (Venezuela) César Izturis (Quality Control); -- (Venezuela) Selwyn Langaigne (Hitting); -- (Venezuela) Oswald Peraza (Bullpen); -- (Venezuela) Tomás Pérez (First Base); -- (Venezuela) Nelson Prada (Bench); -- (Venezuela) Yonathan Sivira (Assistant Hitting); -- (United States) Eric Young Sr. (Third Base); (Coaching staff for 2021-22 season)

== Notable players ==
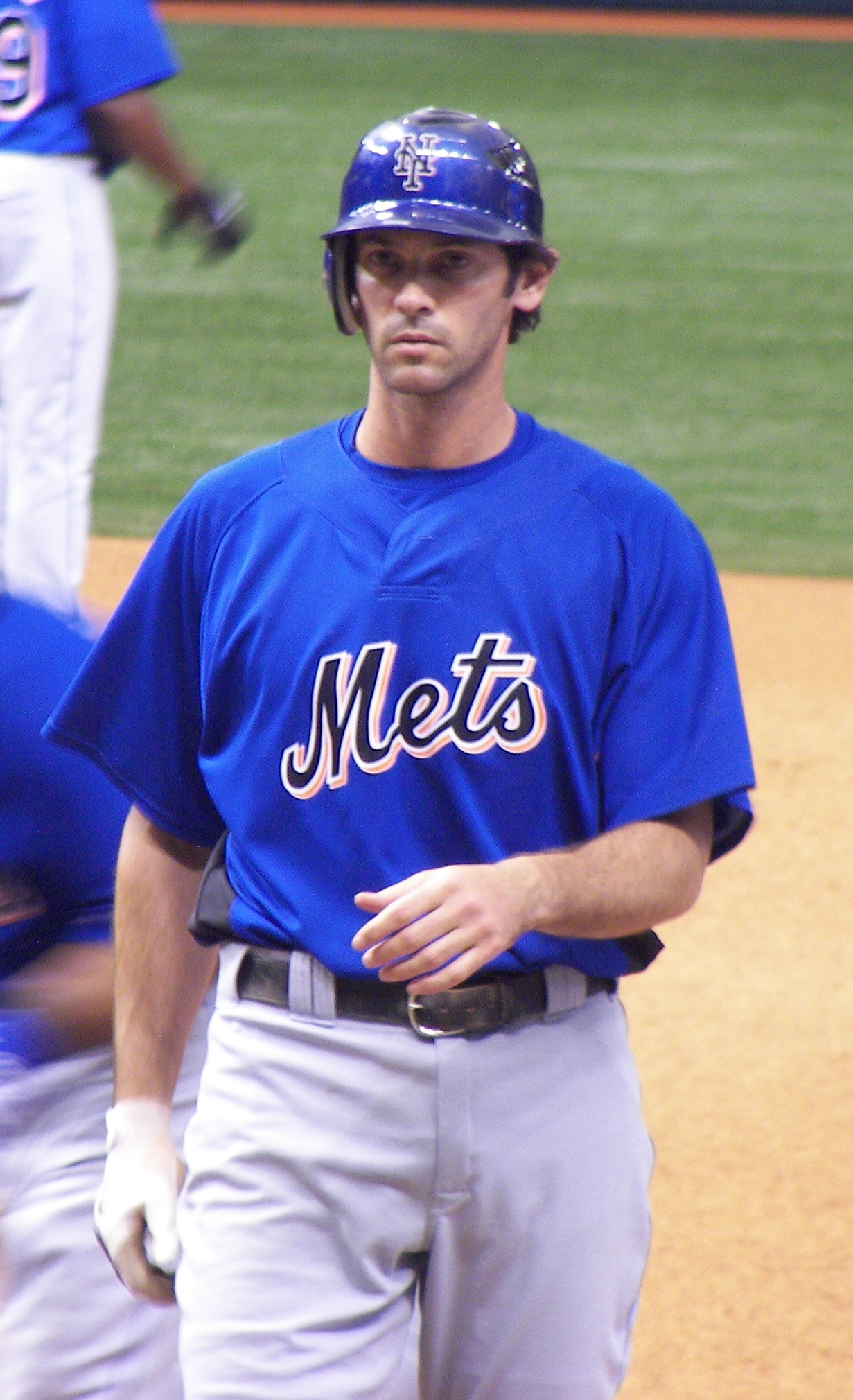
Shawn Green

- Luis Aponte
- Jesse Barfield
- Miguel Cairo
- Giovanni Carrara
- Tony Castillo
- Alcides Escobar
- Kelvim Escobar
- Tom Evans
- Cecil Fielder
- / Shawn Green
- Roy Halladay
- Félix Hernández
- Alexis Infante
- César Izturis
- Luis Leal
- Fred Manrique
- Brandon Morrow
- Joc Pederson
- Robert Pérez
- Scott Pose
- Luis Sojo
