= Tiburones de La Guaira =

Venezuelan baseball team

- Logo

Information
- League: Venezuelan Professional Baseball League
- Location: Macuto, La Guaira
- Ballpark: Estadio Fórum La Guaira; Estadio Universitario
- Founded: 1962
- Caribbean Series championships: 1 (2024)
- League championships: 8 (1964-65, 1965-66, 1968-69, 1970-71, 1982-83, 1984-85, 1985-86, 2023–24)

Current uniforms
Home	Away

Tiburones de La Guaira (English: La Guaira Sharks) are a baseball team in the Venezuelan Professional Baseball League (LVBP). Though they nominally represent La Guaira (playing at the Estadio Jorge Luis García Carneiro), they also play home games at the Estadio Universitario in nearby Caracas. Tiburones have won eight national championships since their founding in 1962, most recently in 2024.

== History ==
In 1962 the Licoreros de Pampero team, which was founded in 1955, was sold for the symbolic price of one Bolívar by his owner Alejandro Hernández to José Antonio Casanova, who was considered the greatest Venezuelan manager at the time. The new team changed its name to Tiburones de la Guaira.

Casanova, who was also the first manager of the team, did not have enough financial resources to go through an entire season. He then talked to his friend, Dr. Jesús Morales Valarino, who suggested an alliance with an important group of personalities and traders such as Manuel Malpica, Jose Antonio Diaz, Mario Gomez y Pablo Diaz. In that moment Tiburones de la Guaira was born, taking the field for first time ever in the 1962–1963 season. It was Morales' idea to take the team to the city of La Guaira, in order to take advantage of a city with no team yet numerous baseball fans.

In their first season, the Tiburones finished with a 23–19 record, missing the finals disputed between the Leones del Caracas and Industriales de Valencia. The team struggled in 1963–1964, ending third with a 23–27 record, being locked out of contention. La Guaira club would have to wait until its third season to win the first league championship, in a five-game confrontation against the Leones.

La Guaira was managed by Casanova until that year, and had remarkable players such as MLB Hall of Famers Luis Aparicio and Rollie Fingers, and Ángel Bravo, José Herrera and Elio Chacón as top Venezuelan figures. Casanova's contract expired in 1965 and the board of directors decided to finish the work relationship buying all his stock. Then Pedro Padrón Panza, who was among the original founders, bought all the stock to become the single owner.

At the time, Padrón worked hard to settle an important base of players which was later known as "La Guerrilla", because –no matter the score of a game– they were a never-surrender bunch of players who gave all to the cause. Some notable names includes the likes of Ozzie Guillén, Carlos Martinez, Gustavo Polidor, Luis Salazar and Luis Mercedes Sánchez, among others.

Padrón suffered a long illness starting in the early 1990s, which affected the level of his beloved team as well. He died in 1999, aged 78, leaving the control of the franchise to his son, Pedro Padrón Briñez, also known as "Peruchito". Nevertheless, Padrón Jr. and his son died in the 1999 Vargas tragedy that killed tens of thousands of people.

Following the 2000–2001 season under manager Luis Salazar, the Tiburones reached the 2011–2012 final series, losing to the Tigres de Aragua in six games. They also competed in an extra-game playoff for a final series spot in the 2008–2009 season against the same opponent.

Tiburones won the title in 2023—24 over Cardenales de Lara. At the 2024 Caribbean Series, Tiburones pitcher Ángel Padrón threw a nine-inning no-hitter against Nicaragua's Gigantes de Rivas, the first no-hitter in the tournament since 1952 (which was thrown against Venezuela).

== Championship titles/managers ==
- 1964–1965: José Antonio Casanova
- 1965–1966: Tony Pacheco
- 1968–1969: Wilfredo Calviño
- 1970–1971: Graciano Ravelo
- 1982–1983: Oswaldo Virgil
- 1984–1985: Aurelio Monteagudo
- 1985–1986: José Martínez
- 2023-2024: Ozzie Guillén

== Caribbean Series records ==
Year	Venue	Finish	Wins	Losses	Win%	Manager
1971	(Puerto Rico) San Juan	2nd place (Note: Tied with Naranjeros de Hermosillo and Cangrejeros de Santurce)	2	4	.333	(Venezuela) Graciano Ravelo
1983	(Venezuela) Caracas	2nd place	4	2	.667	(Dominican Republic) Osvaldo Virgil
1985	(Mexico) Mazatlán	3rd place (Note: Tied with Metropolitanos de San Juan)	2	4	.333	(Cuba) Aurelio Monteagudo
1986	(Venezuela) Maracaibo	2nd place	3	3	.500	(Cuba) José Martínez
2024	(United States) Miami	1st place	7	1	.875	(Venezuela) Ozzie Guillén
Total			18	14	.563	

== Team highlights ==
- 1964–1965 : Darold Knowles won the pitching Triple Crown
- 2013–2014 : Alex Cabrera became the first batting Triple Crown winner in LVBP history

== LVBP regular season leaders ==
=== Hitting ===
Batting average

Season	Player	Total
1966–1967	Tony Curry	.309
1973–1974	Al Bumbry	.367
1974–1975	Al Bumbry	.354
1988–1989	Carlos Martínez	.331
1991–1992	Chad Curtis	.338
2011–2012	César Suárez	.349
2013–2014	Alex Cabrera	.391

Home runs

Season	Player	Total
1977–1978	Clint Hurdle	18
1982–1983	Darryl Strawberry	12
1995–1996	Carlos Martínez	7
2002–2003	Rob Stratton	10
2008–2009	Max Ramírez	15
2013–2014	Alex Cabrera	21

Runs batted in

Season	Player	Total
1962–1963	Dave Roberts	34
1965–1966	John Bateman	38
1981–1982	Gary Rajsich	48
1991–1992	Chad Curtis	37
1995–1996	Carlos Martínez	39
2000–2001	Chris Jones	48
2013–2014	Alex Cabrera	59

=== Pitching ===
Wins

Season	Player	Total
1964–1965	Darold Knowles *	13
1965–1966	Marcelino López	12
1966–1967	Gene Brabender **	13
1967–1968	Eddie Watt ***	12
1972–1973	Jim Rooker	13
1974–1975	Tom House	10
1979–1980	Odell Jones	11
2002–2003	Bill Pulsipher	6

* Tied with Lew Krausse Jr. (Caracas)
** Tied with Jim McGlothlin (Valencia)
*** Tied with Diego Seguí (Caracas)

Earned run average

Season	Player	Total
1962–1963	Dale Willis	2.03
1964–1965	Darold Knowles	2.37
1965–1966	Marcelino López	1.57
1969–1970	Mike Hedlund	0.75
1976–1977	Steve Luebber	2.59

Strikeouts

Season	Player	Total
1962–1963	George Brunet	89
1964–1965	Darold Knowles	155
1966–1967	Gene Brabender	147
1974–1975	Doug Bird	82
1979–1980	Odell Jones	103
1985–1986	Odell Jones	70
1998–1999	Lou Pote	67

== Current roster ==
Tiburones de La Guaira 2023–24 Roster
Players		Coaches
Pitchers: 98 (Venezuela) Elvis Araujo; 44 (Venezuela) Anthony Castro; 38 (Venezuela) Will Changaroty; 83 (Brazil) Tiago Da Silva; 25 (Venezuela) Junior Guerra; 62 (Venezuela) Emilker Guzman; 67 (Venezuela) Arnaldo Hernández; 85 (Venezuela) Eudis Idrogo; 12 (Venezuela) Luis Madero; 66 (Venezuela) Ángel Padrón; 58 (Venezuela) Eduardo Paredes; 17 (United States) Miguel Peña; 46 (Venezuela) Ricardo Pinto; 49 (Venezuela) Jesus Pirela; 70 (Venezuela) Pedro Rodríguez; 68 (Venezuela) Karlo Seijas; 79 (Venezuela) Carlos Suniaga; 71 (Dominican Republic) Jojanse Torres; updated on 16 January 2024	Catchers: 37 (Venezuela) Francisco Arcia; 35 (Venezuela) José Briceño; 20 (Venezuela) Sebastián Rivero; 96 (Venezuela) Luis Torrens; Infielders: 21 (Venezuela) Ehíré Adríanza; 2 (Venezuela) Alcides Escobar; 10 (Venezuela) Wilson García; 22 (Brazil) Leonardo Reginatto; 5 (Venezuela) Maikel Garcia; 7 (Venezuela) Carlos Rivero; 4 (Venezuela) Brayan Rocchio; Outfielders: 13 (Venezuela) Ronald Acuña Jr.; 43 (Venezuela) Lorenzo Cedrola; 1 (Venezuela) Franklin Barreto; 16 (Venezuela) Anthony Jiménez; 31 (Cuba) Yasiel Puig; 99 (Venezuela) Danry Vásquez	Manager: -- (Venezuela) Ozzie Guillén; Coaches: -- (Venezuela) Carlos Zambrano (Pitching); -- (Venezuela) Enrique González (Bullpen); -- (Venezuela) Endy Chávez (First Base); -- (Venezuela) Ender Chávez (Hitting); -- (Venezuela) David Davalillo Sr (Bench); -- (Venezuela) Emilio Linares (Third Base); (Coaching staff for 2023–24 season)

== Major League alumni ==
- Ehíré Adríanza
- Ronald Belisario
- Edwin Bellorín
- Gregor Blanco
- Ángel Bravo
- Alex Cabrera
- Elio Chacón
- Sergio Escalona
- Eduardo Escobar
- Enrique González
- Luis González
- Wiki González
- Ozzie Guillén
- Remigio Hermoso
- Carlos Hernández
- Enzo Hernández
- Luis Hernández
- José Herrera
- Odubel Herrera
- Zach Kroenke
- Felipe Lira
- Carlos Martínez
- José Martínez
- Yoervis Medina
- Ray Olmedo
- Anthony Ortega
- Joe Ortiz
- Alfredo Pedrique
- Salvador Pérez
- Gustavo Polidor
- Max Ramírez
- Francisco Rodríguez
- Guillermo Rodríguez
- Argenis Salazar
- Luis Salazar
- Oscar Salazar
- Richard Salazar
- Héctor Sánchez
- Luis Sánchez
- Danny Sandoval
- Jorge Velandia

== All-time foreign players ==
- Michel Abreu
- Brant Alyea
- Larry Andersen
- Mike Armstrong
- Jeff Baisley
- Dusty Baker
- Jay Baller
- Skeeter Barnes
- John Bateman
- Marvin Benard
- Juan Berenguer
- Roger Bernadina
- Doug Bird
- Bruce Bochy
- Walt Bond
- Daryl Boston
- Gene Brabender
- Bucky Brandon
- Tony Brizzolara
- George Brunet
- Bill Buckner
- Al Bumbry
- Bob Burda
- Sean Burroughs
- Bárbaro Cañizares
- José Cardenal
- Clay Carroll
- Paul Casanova
- Bryan Clark
- Gene Clines
- Lou Collier
- Pat Corrales
- Jerry Cram
- Tony Curry
- Chad Curtis
- Pat Dodson
- Mike Epstein
- Al Ferrara
- Rollie Fingers
- Ken Forsch
- Cito Gaston
- Jay Gibbons
- Troy Glaus
- Ed Glynn
- Brian Gordon
- Jerry Grote
- Larry Gura
- Ken Hamlin
- Brian Harper
- J. C. Hartman
- Mike Hedlund
- Gorman Heimueller
- Tom House
- Clint Hurdle
- James Hurst
- Ron Jackson
- Larry Jaster
- Johnny Jeter
- Shawn Jeter
- Dave Johnson
- Andruw Jones
- Chris Jones
- Odell Jones
- Mike Kekich
- Pat Kelly
- Darold Knowles
- Gary Kroll
- Zach Kroenke (Left-handed Starting pitcher)
- Tom Lampkin
- Jason Lane
- Tim Leary
- Bob Lee
- Bill Lee
- Marcelino López
- Andrew Lorraine
- Steve Luebber
- Barry Lyons
- Tom McCarthy
- José Macías
- Gordon Mackenzie
- Hal McRae
- Rick Mahler
- Jerry Manuel
- José Martínez
- Darrell Miller
- Aurelio Monteagudo
- Donnie Moore
- Omar Moreno
- Curt Motton
- Greg Norton
- Camilo Pascual
- Steve Pegues
- Adolfo Phillips
- Rich Nye
- Jerry Nyman
- Jesse Orosco
- Lou Piniella
- Lou Pote
- Bill Pulsipher
- Gary Rajsich
- Fernando Ramsey
- Stephen Randolph
- Merritt Ranew
- Merv Rettenmund
- Dave Roberts
- Jim Rooker
- Johnny Ruffin
- Chico Ruiz
- Olmedo Sáenz
- Alex Sánchez
- Scott Service
- Randall Simon
- Doug Sisk
- Jim Siwy
- Darryl Strawberry
- Derrel Thomas
- Gary Thurman
- Luis Tiant
- Del Unser
- Dave Vineyard
- Johnny Weekly
- Ryan Vogelsong
- John Wathan
- Eddie Watt
- Jim Weaver
- Ray Webster
- Albert Williams
- Dale Willis
- Travis Wilson
- Mike Witt
- Jimmy Wynn
- Larry Yellen
- Gerald Young
- Walter Young

Sources: PuraPelota.com

=== Retired numbers ===
3 Luis Salazar; SS; Retired	8 Ángel Bravo; OF; Retired	11; Luis Aparicio; SS; Retired	13; Ozzie Guillén; SS; Retired	14; Gustavo Polidor; SS; Retired	15; Robert Marcano; IF; Retired	40; Carlos Martínez; OF; Retired	41; Aurelio Monteagudo; P Retired

== Attendances ==
In the 2015-16 season, the Tiburones de La Guaira became the club with the fourth-highest average home attendance in the league, with an average of 8,324. In the 2023-24 season, the Tiburones drew an average home league attendance of 8,364, the second-highest in the league.

== See also ==
- Tiburones de La Guaira players
- Venezuelan Professional Baseball League
