= Tommy Fine =

American baseball player (1914–2005)

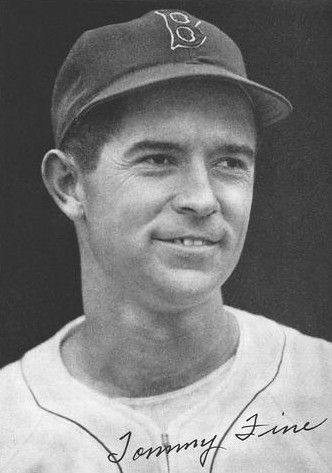
- Fine in 1947
- Pitcher
- Born: October 10, 1914; Cleburne, Texas, U.S.
- Died: January 10, 2005 (aged 90); Little Elm, Texas, U.S.
- Batted: Switch Threw: Right

MLB debut
- April 26, 1947, for the Boston Red Sox

Last MLB appearance
- June 28, 1950, for the St. Louis Browns

MLB statistics
- Win–loss record: 1–3
- Earned run average: 6.81
- Innings pitched: 72 2/3
- Stats at Baseball Reference

Teams
- Boston Red Sox (1947); St. Louis Browns (1950)

Thomas Morgan Fine (October 10, 1914 – January 10, 2005) was an American pitcher in Major League Baseball who played in 23 games for the Boston Red Sox (1947) and St. Louis Browns (1950). The native of Cleburne, Texas, stood 6 feet (1.8 m) tall and weighed 190 pounds (86 kg). He was a switch-hitter and threw right-handed.

Despite pitching just two seasons in the major leagues, Fine was a professional baseball pitcher for 15 years (1939–1942; 1946–1956). He is most remembered for his career in Cuban baseball during five seasons, and especially for being the first (and until 2024, the only) pitcher to hurl a no-hitter game in Caribbean Series history.

== Professional career ==
Fine played for the Scranton Red Sox of the Eastern League, where in 1946 he broke the leagues record for most consecutive wins with 15.

He made his major league debut in 1947 with the Red Sox and finished with a 1–2 record in seven starts. He appeared in the majors again in 1950 with the Browns and posted 0–1 in 14 games as a reliever.

In his majors career, Fine compiled a 1–3 record and a 6.81 earned run average, walking 44 batters while striking out 16 in 72 2/3 innings of work. He was a competent hitting pitcher, batting .333 (6-for-18) with five runs scored and one RBI in 25 games.

In the minors, he went 157–110 with a 3.35 ERA for 12 different teams during 15 seasons spanning 1939–1956.

== Career highlight ==
On February 21, 1952, Fine appeared in the IV Caribbean World Series held in Panama City, Panama, with the Cuban League side Leones del Habana. He was called up by manager Mike González as a late replacement for future Hall of Famer Hoyt Wilhelm.

Guided by catcher Andrés Fleitas, Fine posted the first no-hitter pitched in any Caribbean Series game, to give his team a 1–0 win against the Cervecería Caracas of Venezuela. He also helped himself, going 1 for 3 while scoring the eventual winning run on Sandy Amorós' single in the 6th inning. Hard-luck losing pitcher Al Papai allowed just four singles. Fine's game would be the only no-hitter in tournament history until Ángel Padrón of Venezuela's Tiburones de La Guaira in 2024.

Five days later, Fine faced the Carta Vieja Yankees of Panama and was close to glory. He was three outs from consecutive no-hitters in the Series, having allowed a single in the ninth inning to break it up. His 17 hitless innings streak also is the longest in Series history.

== Personal life ==
Fine served in the United States Army Air Forces during World War II. Following his baseball retirement, he became a respected businessman and also served as a deacon in the Baptist church.

He died in 2005 in Little Elm, Texas, at the age of 90.
