= 2021 Caribbean Series =

2021 baseball tournament

Tournament details
- Country: Mexico
- City: Mazatlán
- Venue: 1 (in 1 host city)
- Dates: January 31, 2021 – February 6, 2021
- Teams: 6

Final positions
- Champions: (Dominican Republic) Águilas Cibaeñas (6th title)
- Runners-up: (Puerto Rico) Criollos de Caguas

The 2021 Caribbean Series (Serie del Caribe) was the 63rd edition of the international competition featuring the champions of the Colombian Professional Baseball League, Dominican Professional Baseball League, Mexican Pacific League, Panamanian Professional Baseball League, Puerto Rican Professional Baseball League, and Venezuelan Professional Baseball League. It took place from January 31 to February 6, 2021, at Estadio Teodoro Mariscal in Mazatlán, Mexico.

Spectators were allowed to attend games, though the stadium only operated at 45% of capacity due to COVID-19 restrictions. Face coverings and socially distanced seating guidelines were enforced.

== Format ==
The Preliminary Round consisted of a fifteen-game round robin, after which the top 4 teams advanced to the Semifinal Round (1st vs. 4th, 2nd vs. 3rd). The winners of the semifinal games then squared off in the Final.

== Participating teams ==
Team	Manager	Means of qualification
(Colombia) Caimanes de Barranquilla	(Colombia) José Mosquera	Winners of the 2020–21 Colombian Professional Baseball League
(Mexico) Tomateros de Culiacán	(Mexico) Benji Gil	Winners of the 2020–21 Mexican Pacific League
(Panama) Federales de Chiriquí	(Cuba) Alfonso Urquiola	Runners-up of the 2019–20 Panamanian Professional Baseball League^{[1]}
(Puerto Rico) Criollos de Caguas	(Puerto Rico) Ramón Vázquez	Winners of the 2020–21 Puerto Rican Professional Baseball League
(Dominican Republic) Águilas Cibaeñas	(Dominican Republic) Félix Fermín	Winners of the 2020–21 Dominican Professional Baseball League
(Venezuela) Caribes de Anzoátegui	(United States) Mike Alvarez^{[2]}	Winners of the 2020–21 Venezuelan Professional Baseball League

1. The 2020–21 Panamanian Professional Baseball League season was canceled due to the ongoing COVID-19 pandemic. Panama still opted to participate in the Caribbean Series and selected an All-Star team from the league’s teams playing under the Federales franchise name.
2. Mike Alvarez was born in Cuba, but raised in the United States.

== Preliminary round ==
Pos	Team	Pld	W	L	RF	RA	RD	PCT	GB	Qualification
1	(Dominican Republic) Águilas Cibaeñas	5	5	0	25	11	+14	1.000	—	Advance to knockout stage
2	(Puerto Rico) Criollos de Caguas	5	4	1	21	18	+3	.800	1	Advance to knockout stage
3	(Mexico) Tomateros de Culiacán (H)	5	3	2	26	18	+8	.600	2	Advance to knockout stage
4	(Panama) Federales de Chiriquí	5	2	3	32	34	−2	.400	3	Advance to knockout stage
5	(Venezuela) Caribes de Anzoátegui	5	1	4	7	15	−8	.200	4	
6	(Colombia) Caimanes de Barranquilla	5	0	5	10	25	−15	.000	5	

Source: MLB
Rules for classification: 1) Wins; 2) Head-to-head matches; 3) Team quality balance; 4) Batting average; 5) Drawing of lots.
(H) Hosts

Time zone: Mountain Standard Time (UTC–7)

Date	Time	Away	Result	Home	Stadium
January 31	10:30	Federales de Chiriquí (Panama)	6–3	(Venezuela) Caribes de Anzoátegui	Estadio Teodoro Mariscal
January 31	15:00	Criollos de Caguas (Puerto Rico)	1–5	(Dominican Republic) Águilas Cibaeñas	Estadio Teodoro Mariscal
January 31	20:00	Tomateros de Culiacán (Mexico)	10–2	(Colombia) Caimanes de Barranquilla	Estadio Teodoro Mariscal
February 1	11:00	Federales de Chiriquí (Panama)	9–5	(Colombia) Caimanes de Barranquilla	Estadio Teodoro Mariscal
February 1	15:30	Caribes de Anzoátegui (Venezuela)	0–3	(Puerto Rico) Criollos de Caguas	Estadio Teodoro Mariscal
February 1	20:00	Águilas Cibaeñas (Dominican Republic)	4–2	(Mexico) Tomateros de Culiacán	Estadio Teodoro Mariscal
February 2	10:30	Caimanes de Barranquilla (Colombia)	0–1	(Venezuela) Caribes de Anzoátegui	Estadio Teodoro Mariscal
February 2	15:00	Águilas Cibaeñas (Dominican Republic)	11–6	(Panama) Federales de Chiriquí	Estadio Teodoro Mariscal
February 2	20:00	Criollos de Caguas (Puerto Rico)	6–4	(Mexico) Tomateros de Culiacán	Estadio Teodoro Mariscal
February 3	10:30	Caribes de Anzoátegui (Venezuela)	0–2	(Dominican Republic) Águilas Cibaeñas	Estadio Teodoro Mariscal
February 3	15:00	Caimanes de Barranquilla (Colombia)	1–2	(Puerto Rico) Criollos de Caguas	Estadio Teodoro Mariscal
February 3	20:00	Tomateros de Culiacán (Mexico)	6–3	(Panama) Federales de Chiriquí	Estadio Teodoro Mariscal
February 4	11:00	Federales de Chiriquí (Panama)	8–9	(Puerto Rico) Criollos de Caguas	Estadio Teodoro Mariscal
February 4	15:30	Caimanes de Barranquilla (Colombia)	2–3	(Dominican Republic) Águilas Cibaeñas	Estadio Teodoro Mariscal
February 4	20:00	Caribes de Anzoátegui (Venezuela)	3–4 (10)	(Mexico) Tomateros de Culiacán	Estadio Teodoro Mariscal

== Knockout stage ==
Semi-finals
4	(Panama) Federales de Chiriquí	3
1	(Dominican Republic) Águilas Cibaeñas	4
3	(Mexico) Tomateros de Culiacán	1
2	(Puerto Rico) Criollos de Caguas	2

Final
1	(Dominican Republic) Águilas Cibaeñas	4
2	(Puerto Rico) Criollos de Caguas	1

=== Semi-finals ===
Date	Time	Away	Result	Home	Stadium
February 5	15:00	Federales de Chiriquí (Panama)	3–4	(Dominican Republic) Águilas Cibaeñas	Estadio Teodoro Mariscal
February 5	20:00	Tomateros de Culiacán (Mexico)	1–2	(Puerto Rico) Criollos de Caguas	Estadio Teodoro Mariscal

=== Final ===
February 6, 2021 20:00 at Estadio Teodoro Mariscal in Mazatlán, Mexico
Team	1	2	3	4	5	6	7	8	9	R	H	E
(Puerto Rico) Criollos de Caguas	0	0	0	0	1	0	0	0	0	1	4	0
(Dominican Republic) Águilas Cibaeñas	0	0	0	0	1	2	0	1	X	4	6	0

== Awards ==
All-Tournament Team
Position	Player
Starting Pitcher	(Dominican Republic) Carlos Martínez
Relief Pitcher	(Dominican Republic) Jumbo Díaz
Catcher	(Puerto Rico) Yadier Molina
First Baseman	(Dominican Republic) Ronald Guzmán
Second Baseman	(Dominican Republic) Robinson Canó
Third Baseman	(Colombia) Jordan Díaz
Shortstop	(Panama) Jonathan Araúz
Outfielders	(Dominican Republic) Melky Cabrera (Dominican Republic) Juan Lagares (Puerto Rico) Jarren Duran
Designated Hitter	(Mexico) Jesse Castillo
Manager	(Dominican Republic) Félix Fermín
