= Clarisse Albrecht =

Actress, Screenwriter, Producer and Songwriter

- Also known as: Mulata Universal
- Born: Clarisse Albrecht; 28 June 1978 (age 48); Rueil-Malmaison, France
- Genres: World Music, Deep-House, Quiet Storm, Soul
- Occupations: Actress, Screenwriter, Producer, Singer, Songwriter
- Instrument: Vocals
- Years active: 2005–present
- Website: www.clarissealbrecht.com

Clarisse Albrecht (born 28 June 1978) is a French actress, screenwriter, producer, recording artist, singer-songwriter and former model. She's a multi-lingual artist, performing and writing in English, Portuguese, French and Spanish. She currently lives between France and Dominican Republic.

== Early life ==
Clarisse Albrecht was born in Rueil Malmaison, France, to a French father and a Cameroonian mother. She split her childhood between France, Guinea-Bissau and Mozambique.

== Career ==
In May 2010, she released independently (digital download only) her debut single "Você Me Dá", a deep-house tune with Brazilian music and soul influences. The song has been aired on more than 33 countries and over 125 radios. It has been two times nominated at the MOAMAS 2011 (Museke Online African Music Awards) as Best African Diaspora Song and Afro-Fusion. It finally won the prize as Best African Diaspora Song. In February 2013, she released her second single "Não Posso Parar", a tune with a stronger Soul Music influence.

On 22 June 2015 she released her debut album entitled "Mulata Universal".

Since 2016, she's been working as a screenwriter for music-videos and feature films. Alongside Ivan Herrera, she wrote Bantú Mama, directed by Ivan Herrera. The film made its World Premiere at SXSW, being the first Dominican film to be selected by the festival.

== Discography ==
=== Singles ===
- 2010: "Você Me Dá"
- 2013: "Não Posso Parar
- 2013: "No Puedo Parar"
- 2015: "Deixa Rolar"

=== Albums ===
- 2015: "Mulata Universal"

=== Participations ===
- 2005: Différent, album by LS : Additional vocals on "At Home"
- 2008: Cool Off Chillout (A Fine Selection of Chillout Music) - "Não Posso Parar (Soulavenue's Sweet Teardrop Mix)" (Sine Music, Germany)
- 2010: "Você Me Dá" featured in "Soul Unsigned : The 2010 Summer Session" (Soul Unsigned, United Kingdom)
- 2010: "Você Me Dá - Lil'Lion House Mix" featured in "Summer Club, le son electropical 2010" (Wagram, France)
- 2011: "Você Me Dá - SoulAvenue's Tropicalita Mix" featured in The Bossa Night Club, Vol. 2 (Lola's Records, Germany)
- 2011: "Não Posso Parar (Soulavenue's Sweet Teardrop Mix)" and "Você Me Dá - SoulAvenue's Tropicalita Mix" featured on SoulAvenue's album "Swept Away"

== Videography ==
- 2010: "Você Me Dá", directed by Ivan Herrera
- 2013: "Não Posso Parar, directed by Ivan Herrera

== Awards ==
- 2023: Bantú Mama, directed by Ivan Herrera: Outstanding International Motion Picture, The 54th NAACP Image Awards
- 2022: Bantú Mama, directed by Ivan Herrera: Best Performer, Durban International Film Festival 2022
- 2011: "Você Me Dá", Best African Diaspora Song, MOAMAS 2011

== Filmography ==
=== Acting Credits ===
Year	Title	Role	Director	Notes
2009	Femmes De Loi	Virginie Balard	Klaus Biedermann	TV series (1 episode)
2010	Affaires Étrangères	Amelia Rodriguez	Vincenzo Marano	TV series (1 episode)
2018	The Long Song	Mary Ellis	Mahalia Belo	3 Parts Television Serial (2 episodes)
2021	Bantú Mama	Emma (Lead)	Ivan Herrera	Feature Film - World Premiere at SXSW Best Performer – Durban International Film Festival 2022
2022	The Best Man: Final Chapters	Savannah	Malcolm D. Lee	Limited Series (2 episodes)
2023	Saint X	Deputy	Darren Grant	TV series (1 episode)

Other credits

Year	Title	Role
2021	Bantú Mama	Screenwriter and Executive Producer
