= Jarren Duran =

American baseball player (born 1996)

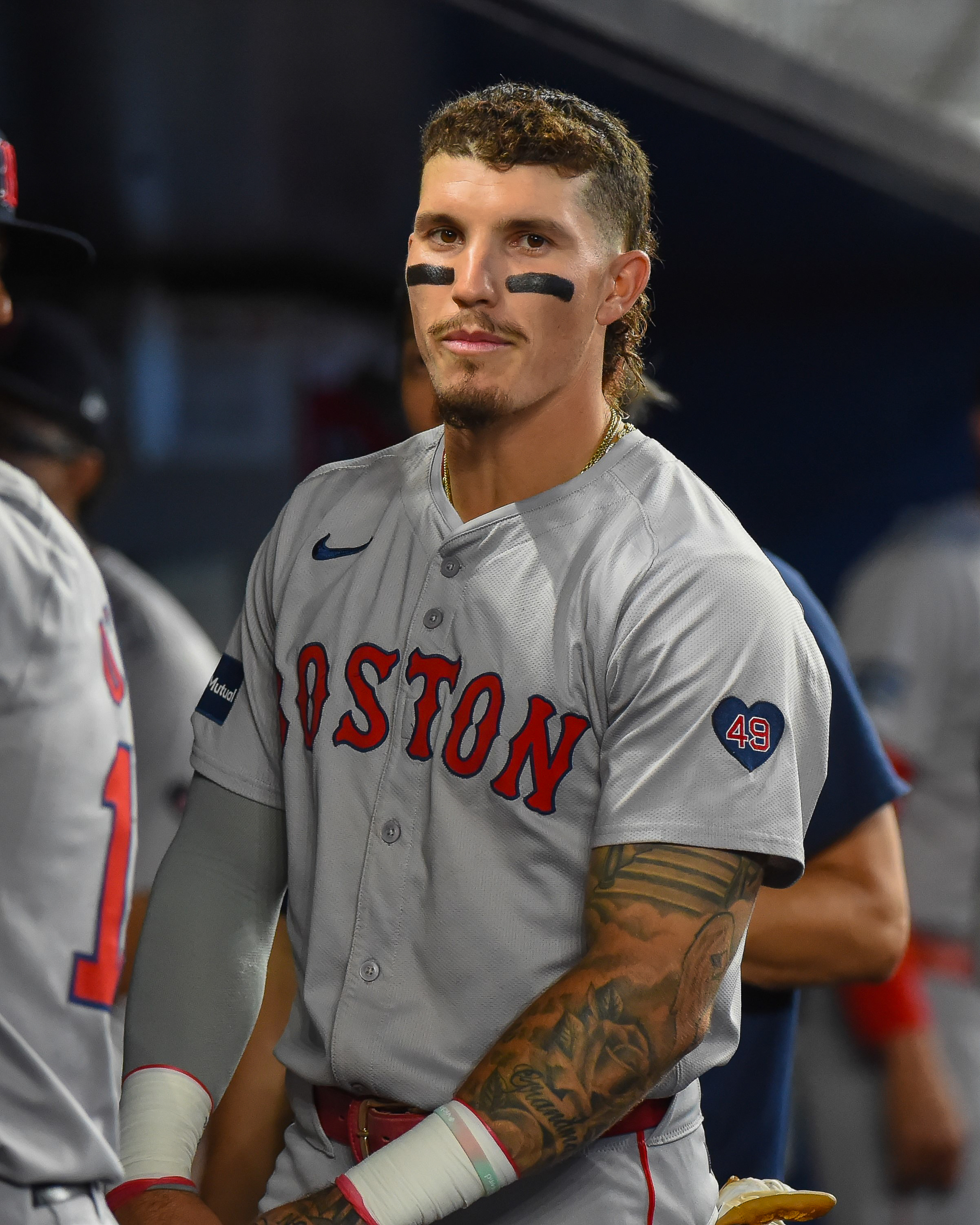
- Duran with the Red Sox in 2024

Boston Red Sox – No. 16
- Outfielder
- Born: September 5, 1996 (age 30); Corona, California, U.S.
- Bats: Left Throws: Right

MLB debut
- July 17, 2021, for the Boston Red Sox

MLB statistics (through 2026 season)
- Batting average: .254
- Home runs: 70
- Runs batted in: 295
- Stats at Baseball Reference

Teams
- Boston Red Sox (2021–present)

Career highlights and awards
- All-Star (2024); AL triples leader (2024, 2025)
Medals
Men's baseball
Representing Mexico
World Baseball Classic
Bronze medal – third place	2023 Miami	Team

Jarren William Duran (born September 5, 1996) is an American professional baseball outfielder for the Boston Red Sox of Major League Baseball (MLB). He made his MLB debut in 2021. Listed at 6 feet 0 inches (1.83 m) and 205 pounds (93 kg), he bats left-handed and throws right-handed. Duran was named the MVP of the 2024 MLB All-Star Game. Born in the United States, he represents Mexico at the international level.

== Amateur career ==
Duran attended Cypress High School in Cypress, California, then played three seasons of college baseball at California State University, Long Beach, where he was primarily a second baseman. In 2017, he played collegiate summer baseball for the Wareham Gatemen of the Cape Cod Baseball League. He was selected by the Boston Red Sox in the seventh round of the 2018 Major League Baseball draft.

== Professional career ==
=== Boston Red Sox ===
==== Minor leagues ====
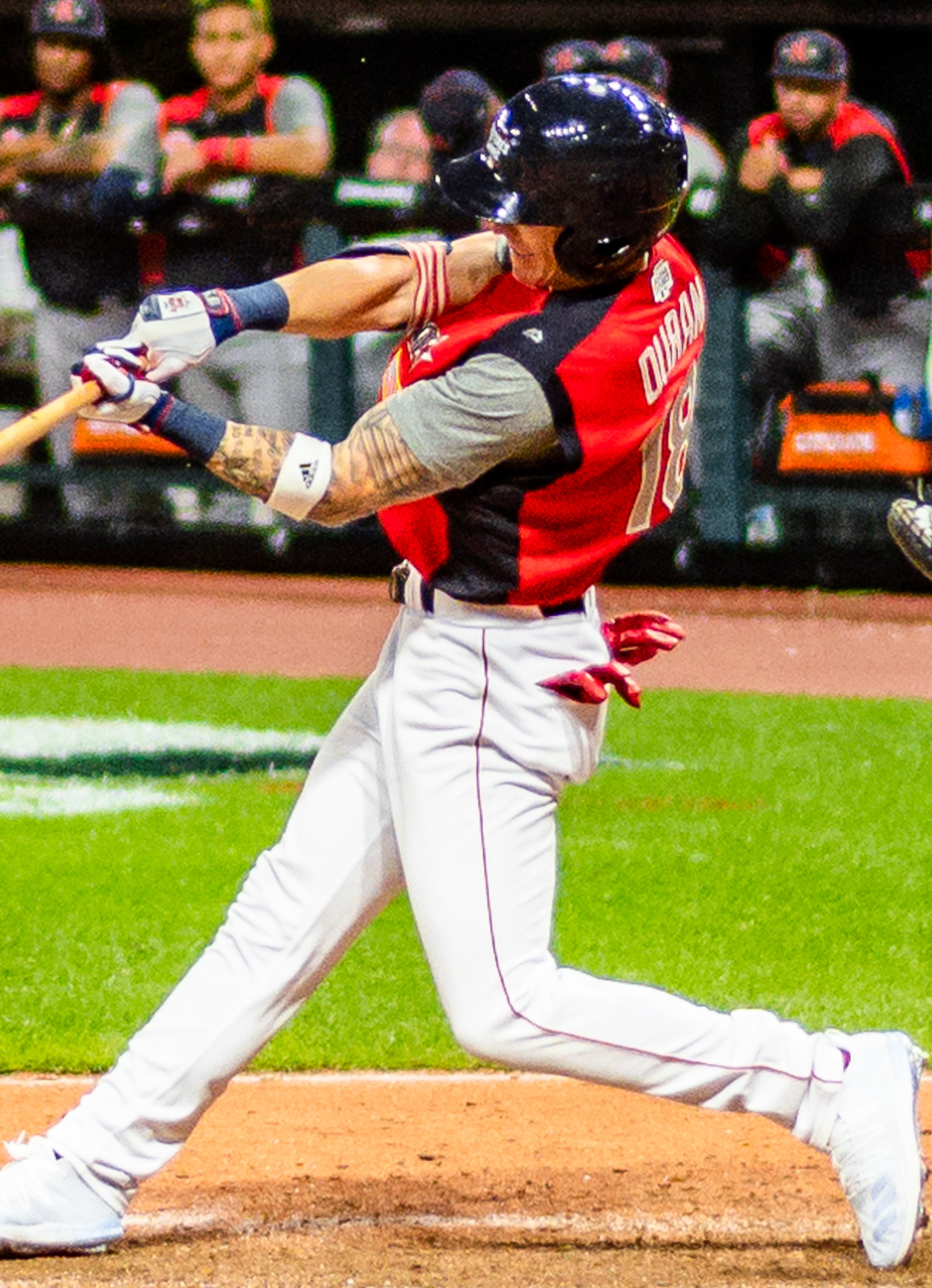
Duran in 2019

Duran spent his first professional season with the Lowell Spinners and Greenville Drive, batting a combined .357 during 2018. He started the 2019 season with the High-A Salem Red Sox, and was promoted to the Double-A Portland Sea Dogs on June 3. In mid-June, Duran was added to the top 100 prospects list of Baseball America, at number 99. Duran was named to the 2019 All-Star Futures Game, going 1-for-2 after entering the game in the sixth inning. In mid-September, Duran was named the High-A (Class A-Advanced) player of the year by Baseball America, and was named the Red Sox' minor league baserunner of the year. Overall during 2019 with both Salem and Portland, Duran batted .303 with five home runs and 38 RBIs in 132 games.

Duran was invited to spring training by the Red Sox in 2020. He did not play that season, due to cancellation of the minor league season. In November 2020, Duran was ranked by Baseball America as the Red Sox' number five prospect. During the 2020–21 Puerto Rican Winter League season, he was named MVP of the final series, helping Criollos de Caguas to the championship.

==== 2021: MLB Debut ====
The Red Sox invited Duran to their spring training for the second consecutive season in 2021; he subsequently started the season with the Triple-A Worcester Red Sox.

On July 16, he was selected to Boston's 40-man roster. He made his MLB debut the following day, starting in center field against the New York Yankees. In his first at-bat, he collected a hit off of Gerrit Cole and came around to score two batters later. He hit his first major-league home run on July 19 against Ross Stripling of the Toronto Blue Jays. Duran was placed on the COVID-19 related injured list on August 6, and returned to the lineup two days later. On August 24, Duran was optioned back to Triple-A, having batted .221 with 33 strikeouts in 89 plate appearances with Boston. He was recalled to Boston two days later, when Hunter Renfroe was placed on the bereavement list. On September 3, Duran was placed on the COVID-related list. He was activated on September 23 and optioned to Worcester. Overall with Boston during the regular season, Duran appeared in 33 games, batting .215 with two home runs and 10 RBIs. He also made 60 appearances for Worcester, batting .258 with 16 home runs and 36 RBIs.

==== 2022 ====
Duran started the 2022 season in Triple-A with Worcester. He was ranked 84th in the list of baseball's top 100 prospects by Baseball America. Duran was with Boston for the game of May 6, while Kiké Hernández was on the COVID-related injured list. He was also briefly with Boston in early June, while Jackie Bradley Jr. was on the paternity list. He was again recalled in mid-June when Christian Arroyo was placed on the COVID-related list. Duran remained with Boston until being placed on the restricted list in late June when the team traveled to Toronto, due to his vaccination status. On July 22, he once again fell victim to Toronto, this time in center field at Fenway Park where he lost track of a fly ball and apparently gave up on the play, resulting in Raimel Tapia of the Blue Jays scoring an inside-the-park grand slam; the Red Sox lost the game, 28–5, setting a Blue Jays record for the largest margin of victory. Duran was optioned back to Worcester on August 27, when Trevor Story was activated from the injured list. Duran was later recalled by the Red Sox for one game in Toronto, on September 30, having been vaccinated since the June series. Overall for the season, Duran played in 58 major-league games, batting .221 with 3 home runs and 17 RBIs, and 68 minor-league games, batting .283 with 10 home runs and 38 RBIs.

==== 2023 ====
Duran was optioned to Triple-A Worcester to begin the 2023 season. He was recalled to Boston on April 17, after an injury to Adam Duvall Over the next several months, Duran established himself as an effective hitter (ranked fourth in MLB for doubles) and base stealer (24-for-26) at the major-league level. He became a fixture in Boston's lineup, and established himself as an everyday player. On August 22, however, he was placed on the injured list due to a toe injury. On August 29, it was announced that Duran would undergo a season-ending surgery for turf toe. Duran batted .295 with 8 home runs and 40 RBIs through 102 games in 2023, adding 24 stolen bases. At the time of his injury, his 34 doubles were seventh in MLB and fourth in the American League. On September 4, the team transferred him to the 60-day injured list.

==== 2024: All-Star Game MVP ====
Prior to spring training, Duran was announced by manager Alex Cora as the leadoff hitter for the 2024 season. He was selected to play in the 2024 MLB All-Star Game, and was named the All-Star Game MVP after hitting a home run that provided the American League with the game-winning runs.

On August 11, 2024, Duran was caught on broadcast audio calling a heckler a "fucking faggot". He issued an apology and was suspended two games by the Red Sox for using a homophobic slur. MLB then stated it would then donate the salary of his suspended games to Greater PFLAG Boston.

In 2024, Duran led the major leagues in plate appearances with 735, at bats with 675, and doubles with 48, tied for the MLB lead with 14 triples, and posted a .285/.342/.492 slash line with 111 runs, 24 home runs, and 75 RBIs. He placed 8th in American League MVP voting. He was also named to the All-MLB Second Team as an outfielder.

==== 2025 ====
Duran began the 2025 season once again as the Red Sox leadoff hitter. On August 31, in a day game against the Pittsburgh Pirates at Fenway Park, he hit an inside-the-park home run, rounding the bases in 14.71 seconds, the fastest home run trot by any player in 2025.

Duran finished 2025 leading the American League in triples for the second consecutive season with 13, hit 41 doubles which was good for third most in the AL, and had a final slash line of .256/.332/.442 with 16 home runs, 84 RBIs, and 24 stolen bases. Following the 2025 regular season, Duran played in his first career playoff series in the 2025 American League Wild Card Series against the New York Yankees.

==== 2026 ====
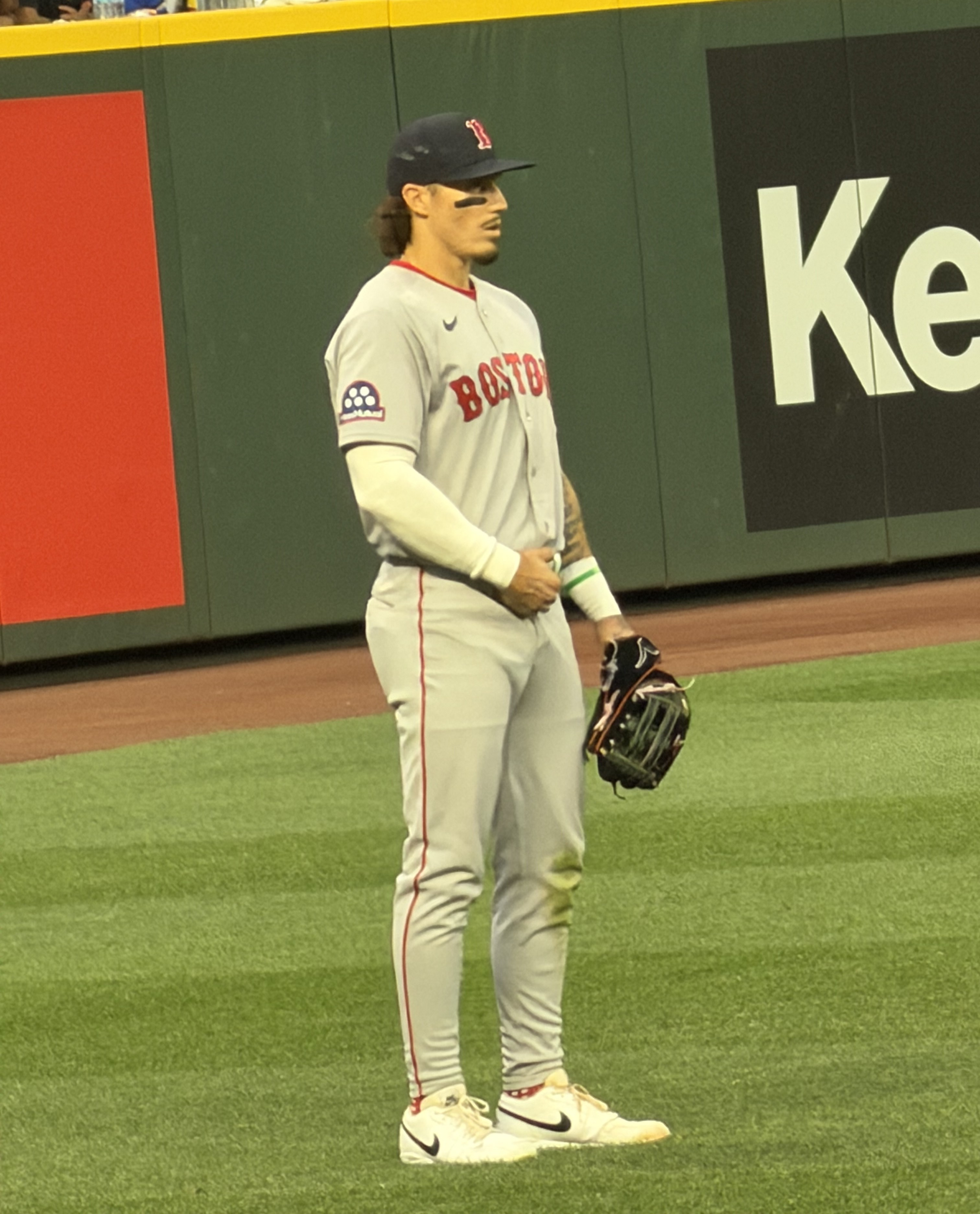
Duran in 2026

Duran started Opening Day as the designated hitter, batting third in the lineup. With the Red Sox having five outfielders on their Opening Day roster, it was expected that Duran would split time between leftfield and DH with Roman Anthony. However, after Anthony was placed on the injured list in early May, Duran was once again the every day left fielder. On May 31, Duran hit his 11th career leadoff home run, the second most in Red Sox history trailing only Mookie Betts with 20. On June 28, Duran hit his second career walk-off hit with a 10th inning single against the New York Yankees. This walk-off capped a four game series sweep of the Yankees, the first for the Red Sox since 2018. Duran finished the 2026 season batting .207/.266/.361 with 20 home runs and 21 stolen bases.

== International career ==
He played in the 2021 Caribbean Series for the Criollos de Caguas, based in Caguas, Puerto Rico, in which he helped lead the team to the championship game and was selected to the All-Tournament Team.

In May 2021, Duran was named to the roster of the United States national baseball team for the Americas Qualifying Event. While the team qualified for the 2020 Summer Olympics, held in Tokyo in 2021, Duran was not included on the Olympic roster, due to the possibility of being called up by the Red Sox.

For the World Baseball Classic, Duran is also eligible to represent Mexico through his father Octavio and Puerto Rico through his mother Dena. He has represented Mexico for the 2023 and 2026 editions of the tournament.

== Personal life ==
Duran states that he attempted suicide in 2022 using a rifle. In the 2025 Netflix documentary The Clubhouse: A Year With the Red Sox, he said “I had my rifle and I had a bullet, and I pulled the trigger and the gun clicked, but nothing happened.”

Duran is of Mexican descent through his father, allowing him to represent Mexico in both the 2023 and 2026 World Baseball Classic.

Despite growing up in Southern California, Duran grew up a Red Sox fan and idolized long-time Red Sox second baseman Dustin Pedroia.
