= List of Major League Baseball players from Panama =

Baseball list

This is an alphabetical list of baseball players from Panama who played in Major League Baseball between 1955 and 2024. The first Panamanian ever to appear in the Majors was Humberto Robinson.

== Current ==
In order of MLB debut (oldest - newest)

- Edmundo Sosa for the Philadelphia Phillies
- Justin Lawrence for the Minnesota Twins
- Ivan Herrera for the St. Louis Cardinals
- José Caballero for the New York Yankees
- Miguel Amaya for the Chicago Cubs
- Daniel Espino for the Cleveland Guardians

== Current ==
Minor League Baseball

- Jonathan Arauz
- Johan Camargo
- Allen Córdoba
- Randall Delgado
- José Ramos
- Paolo Espino
- Ariel Jurado
- Rubén Tejada
- Darío Agrazal
- Adan Sanchez

== Former ==
- Ed Acosta
- Manny Acosta
- Jonathan Arauz
- Jaime Barria
- Manuel Barrios
- Juan Berenguer
- Christian Bethancourt
- Enrique Burgos (born 1965)
- Enrique Burgos (born 1990)
- Rod Carew
- Ossie Chavarria
- Ángel Chávez
- Bruce Chen
- Webbo Clarke
- Manny Corpas
- Roger Deago
- Luis Durango
- Einar Díaz
- Mike Eden
- Gil Garrido
- Severino González
- Javy Guerra
- Bill Haywood
- Tom Hughes
- Roberto Kelly
- Carlos Lee
- Allan Lewis
- Héctor López
- José Macías
- Carlos Maldonado
- Rafael Medina
- Ramiro Mendoza
- Orlando Miller
- Omar Moreno
- Julio Mosquera
- Ivan Murrell
- Sherman Obando
- Ben Oglivie
- Adolfo Phillips
- Bobby Prescott
- Fernando Ramsey
- Mariano Rivera
- Rubén Rivera
- Dave Roberts
- Humberto Robinson
- Davis Romero
- Carlos Ruiz
- Olmedo Sáenz
- Chico Salmon
- Manny Sanguillén
- Pat Scantlebury
- Fernando Seguignol
- Rennie Stennett
- Ray Webster
- Julio Zuleta
