= Bantú Mama =

2021 drama film

- Film poster
- Directed by: Ivan Herrera
- Written by: Clarisse Albrecht; Ivan Herrera
- Produced by: Ivan Herrera; Clarisse Albrecht; Nicolas LaMadrid; Franmiris Lombert
- Starring: Clarisse Albrecht; Scarlet Reyes; Euris Javiel; Arturo Perez; Donis Taveras
- Cinematography: Sebastián Cabrera Chelin
- Edited by: Pablo Chea, Israel Cárdenas
- Music by: Mediumship Music; LS; Boddhi Satva
- Production companies: Point Barre; Basecamp Studio; Aurora Dominicana
- Distributed by: ARRAY; Netflix
- Release dates: 16 March 2021 (SXSW); 13 October 2022 (Dominican Republic); 17 November 2022 (Netflix)
- Running time: 77 minutes
- Country: Dominican Republic
- Languages: Spanish; French

Bantú Mama is a 2021 Dominican drama film directed by Ivan Herrera and written by Ivan Herrera and Clarisse Albrecht. Produced by Ivan Herrera, Clarisse Albrecht, Nicolas LaMadrid and Franmiris Lombert, it was filmed in the Dominican Republic, France and Senegal. The film tells the story of Emma (Clarisse Albrecht), a French woman of African descent who manages to escape after being arrested in the Dominican Republic. She finds shelter in the most dangerous district of Santo Domingo, where she is taken in by a group of children (Scarlet Reyes, Euris Javiel and Arturo Perez). By becoming their protégée and maternal figure, she experiences an unimaginable change in her destiny.

The film was selected as the Dominican entry for the Best International Feature Film at the 95th Academy Awards. ARRAY acquired the distribution rights to the film in the United States, Canada, United Kingdom, Australia and New Zealand, and it was released on Netflix on 17 November 2022.

== Release ==
It had its world premiere on 16 March 2021, at South By South West, being the first Dominican feature film to be selected by the festival.

== Awards and nominations ==
Year	Ceremony	Result	Notes
2021	LIFFY - Latin & Iberian Film Festival at Yale	Best Feature Feature Film	Won
2021	47/Festival de Huelva - Cine Iberoamericano	Best Photography	Won
2021	Durban International Film Festival	Best International Feature Feature Film	Won
2021	Durban International Film Festival	Best Photography	Won
2021	Durban International Film Festival	Best Performer for Clarisse Albrecht	Won
2021	Nova Frontier Film Festival	Special Mention	Won
2022	QAFF 2022 - Quibdó África Film Festival	Best Feature Film	Won
2023	NAACP Images Awards	Outstanding International Motion Picture	Won
