= Humberto Robinson =

Panamanian baseball player (1930–2009)

- Pitcher
- Born: June 25, 1930; Colón, Panama
- Died: September 29, 2009 (aged 79); Brooklyn, New York, U.S.
- Batted: Right Threw: Right

MLB debut
- April 20, 1955, for the Milwaukee Braves

Last MLB appearance
- July 24, 1960, for the Philadelphia Phillies

MLB statistics
- Win–loss record: 8–13
- Earned run average: 3.25
- Strikeouts: 114
- Stats at Baseball Reference

Teams
- Milwaukee Braves (1955–1958); Cleveland Indians (1959); Philadelphia Phillies (1959–1960)

Member of the Caribbean

Baseball Hall of Fame
- Induction: 2001

Humberto Valentino Robinson (June 25, 1930 – September 29, 2009) was a Panamanian pitcher in Major League Baseball who played from 1955 through 1960 for the Milwaukee Braves (1955, 1958), Cleveland Indians (1959) and Philadelphia Phillies (1959–60). Listed at 6 ft 1 in (1.85 m), 155 lb (70 kg), Robinson batted and threw right-handed. He was born in Colón, Panama. Robinson was the first Panamanian-born player to appear in Major League Baseball when he debuted with the Braves on April 20, 1955 (though Victor Greenidge had appeared in the Negro National League in 1941).

Before debuting in the majors, Robinson set a South Atlantic League record with 23 wins in 1954. He is also notable for reporting a US$1500 offer to throw a game in 1959.

In an eight-season career, Robinson posted an 8–13 record with a 3.25 ERA and four saves in 102 appearances, including seven starts and two complete games, giving up 77 earned runs on 189 hits and 90 walks while striking out 114 in 213.0 innings of work. In 10 minor league seasons, Robinson compiled a record of 122–84 with a 3.05 ERA for nine different teams (1951–57, 1960–62). He also was a main force in the pitching staff of Panamanian teams during the first stage of the Caribbean Series.

Robinson died on September 29, 2009, in Brooklyn, New York, aged 79, due to complications from Alzheimer's disease.

== See also ==
- List of Major League Baseball players from Panama
