= Nelson Velázquez =

Puerto Rican baseball player (born 1998)

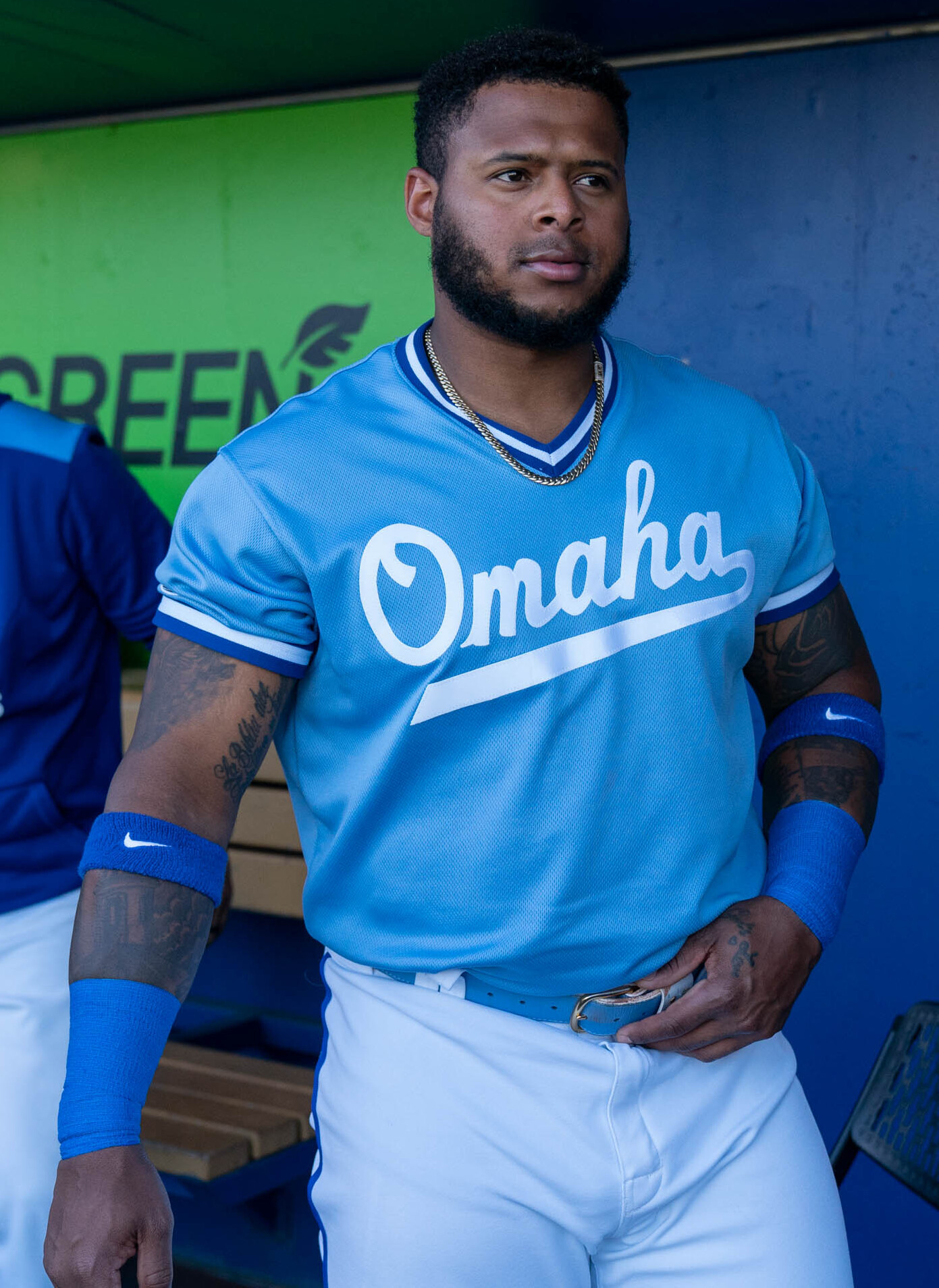
- Velázquez with the Omaha Storm Chasers in 2025

Yokohama DeNA BayStars
- Outfielder / Designated hitter
- Born: December 26, 1998 (age 27); Carolina, Puerto Rico
- Bats: Right Throws: Right

MLB debut
- May 30, 2022, for the Chicago Cubs

MLB statistics (through 2026 season)
- Batting average: .208
- Home runs: 37
- Runs batted in: 105
- Stats at Baseball Reference

Teams
- Chicago Cubs (2022–2023); Kansas City Royals (2023–2024); St. Louis Cardinals (2026); Houston Astros (2026)

Nelson Javier Velázquez Romero (born December 26, 1998) is a Puerto Rican professional baseball outfielder and designated hitter for the Yokohama DeNA BayStars of Nippon Professional Baseball (NPB). He has previously played in Major League Baseball (MLB) for the Chicago Cubs, Kansas City Royals, St. Louis Cardinals, and Houston Astros.

== Career ==
=== Chicago Cubs ===
The Chicago Cubs drafted Velázquez in the fifth round, with the 165th overall selection, of the 2017 Major League Baseball draft. He made his professional debut that year, playing with the rookie-level Arizona League Cubs. In 2018, Velázquez split time with the Low-A Eugene Emeralds and Single-A South Bend Cubs, batting .231 overall for the season; in 103 games, he had 11 home runs and 40 RBI. In 2019, he mainly played at the Single-A level, where he batted .286 with four home runs and 34 RBI in 72 games. He then played in the Puerto Rican Winter League in the 2019–20 offseason.

Velázquez did not play in a game in 2020 due to the cancellation of the minor league season because of the COVID-19 pandemic. In 2021, he played 69 games for the South Bend Cubs, a High-A affiliate, and 34 games for the Tennessee Smokies, a Double-A affiliate. Overall, Velázquez batted .270 with 20 home runs and 73 RBI in 103 game; he also stole 17 bases. After the regular season, he played for the Mesa Solar Sox of the Arizona Fall League where he batted .366 with nine home runs and 21 RBI in 26 games. Velázquez was named MVP of the 2021 Arizona Fall League season, and was also added to the Cubs' 40-man roster following the 2021 season.

Velázquez reached the Triple-A level in 2022 with the Iowa Cubs, and was added to Chicago's active roster prior to a doubleheader on May 30. He made his major-league debut the same day, collecting a hit in his first MLB at bat. On July 4, Velázquez hit his first career home run off of Eric Lauer of the Milwaukee Brewers. He played in 77 games for the Cubs in his rookie campaign, hitting .205/.286/.373 with six home runs, 26 RBI, and five stolen bases.

Velázquez was optioned to Triple-A Iowa to begin the 2023 season. He was recalled back to the Majors, on April 10. The following day, he hit his first career grand slam, to give the Cubs an 8-7 lead against the Seattle Mariners, after they were previously down 7-0. Velazquez was optioned back to Triple-A Iowa on May 8.

=== Kansas City Royals ===
On July 31, 2023, the Cubs traded Velázquez to the Kansas City Royals in exchange for José Cuas. Velázquez was assigned to the Triple-A Omaha Storm Chasers to begin his tenure with the club. On August 10, Velázquez was called up to make his Royals debut, hitting a home run in his first plate appearance the next day. Velázquez hit a home run the following day in his second career game for Kansas City, making him 3-for-8 with two home runs and three RBI in his first two games with the team. In 40 games for the Royals, he batted .233/.299/.579 with 14 home runs and 28 RBI.

Velázquez made 64 appearances for Kansas City during the 2024 campaign, slashing .200/.274/.366 with eight home runs, 27 RBI, and two stolen bases. On March 23, 2025, Velázquez was removed from the 40-man roster and sent outright to Triple-A Omaha. In 33 appearances for the Storm Chasers, he slashed .202/.298/.377 with six home runs, 14 RBI, and four stolen bases. Velázquez was released by the Royals organization on May 28.

=== Guerreros de Oaxaca ===
On June 4, 2025, Velázquez signed with the Guerreros de Oaxaca of the Mexican League. In 49 appearances for Oaxaca, Velázquez batted .357/.444/.658 with 15 home runs, 57 RBI, and four stolen bases.

=== Pittsburgh Pirates ===
On September 1, 2025, Velázquez signed a minor league contract with the Pittsburgh Pirates organization. He made 18 appearances for the Triple-A Indianapolis Indians, batting .284/.329/.554 with five home runs, 17 RBI, and one stolen base. Velázquez elected free agency following the season on November 6.

=== St. Louis Cardinals ===
On January 26, 2026, Velázquez signed a minor league contract with the St. Louis Cardinals. He made 40 appearances for the Triple-A Memphis Redbirds, batting .232/.344/.420 with seven home runs, 22 RBI, and four stolen bases. On May 29, the Cardinals selected Velázquez's contract, adding him to their active roster. In 34 appearances for St. Louis, he batted .216/.289/.432 with four home runs and 12 RBI. Velázquez was designated for assignment by the Cardinals on August 8.

=== Houston Astros ===
On August 10, 2026, Velázquez was claimed off of waivers by the Houston Astros. He was designated for assignment by Houston on August 20; he cleared waivers and elected free agency three days later. On August 24, he was re-signed by the Astros to a major league contract. Velázquez appeared in 13 games for Houston, going 3-for-27 (.111 batting average), hit two home runs and collected 6 RBI. During Game 1 of the American League Wild Card Series, Velázquez entered as a pinch hitter and homered in his first career plate appearance in the playoffs. Velázquez was 1-for-3 at the plate during the Wild Card Series prior to a sweep of the Astros by the Chicago White Sox.

=== Yokohama DeNA BayStars ===
On November 9, 2026, Velázquez signed with the Yokohama DeNA BayStars of Nippon Professional Baseball.

== International career ==
Velázquez was named to the All-Tournament team for the 2024 Caribbean Series while playing winter league baseball for the Criollos de Caguas of the Puerto Rican Professional Baseball League.

== See also ==
- List of Major League Baseball players from Puerto Rico
