= Ángel Padrón (baseball) =

Venezuelan baseball player (born 1997)

Free agent
- Pitcher
- Born: September 16, 1997 (age 28); San Cristóbal, Táchira, Venezuela
- Bats: Left Throws: Left

Ángel Ernesto Padrón (born September 16, 1997) is a Venezuelan professional baseball left-handed pitcher who is a free agent. He signed with the Boston Red Sox as an international free agent in 2014. Padrón is listed at 5 feet 11 inches (1.80 m) and 175 pounds (79 kg).

In 2024, Padrón threw a no hitter against Gigantes de Rivas of the Nicaraguan League, the first in Caribbean Series history since 1952.

== Career ==
=== Boston Red Sox ===
On July 14, 2014, Padrón signed with the Boston Red Sox organization as an international free agent. He made his professional debut with the Dominican Summer League Red Sox, working to a 5.21 earned run average (ERA). In 2016, he played for the DSL Red Sox and the rookie-level GCL Red Sox, working to a 3.86 ERA over 13 games. He returned the next year and posted a 3.21 ERA in 10 games. He was promoted partway through the season and played in Single-A for the Lowell Spinners of the New York–Penn League, posting a 5.14 ERA in 14.0 innings of work.

The following year, in 2018, Padrón was promoted to the High-A Greenville Drive, and worked to a 3.99 ERA in 29 games. He returned to Greenville in 2019, making 28 appearances and posting a 2–7 record and 3.40 ERA with 85 strikeouts across 76 2/3 innings pitched. Padrón was released by the Red Sox organization on November 14, 2019.

=== Guerreros de Oaxaca ===
On January 20, 2023, Padrón signed with the Guerreros de Oaxaca of the Mexican League. In 12 games for Oaxaca, Padrón worked to a 5.16 ERA, allowing 24 walks.

=== Dorados de Chihuahua ===
On October 6, 2023, Padrón signed with El Águila de Veracruz of the Mexican League. However, on December 22, he was traded to the Dorados de Chihuahua. In 8 starts for Chihuahua in 2024, he struggled to a 2–5 record and 6.18 ERA with 26 strikeouts across 39 1/3 innings pitched. Padrón was released by the Dorados on November 19, 2024.

== Winter leagues ==
Padrón has played several seasons in the Venezuelan Professional Baseball League, most of them with the Tigres de Aragua, whom he played for in four seasons from 2020–21 to 2023–24. He starting the 2023–24 LVBP season with an 11.37 ERA with the Tigres. On November 14, 2023, Padrón was traded, along with 3B Carlos Rivero and RHP Pedro Rodriguez, to Tiburones de La Guaira for Angel Aguilar and Leobaldo Cabrera. With Tiburones, Padrón's performance improved significantly, to an ERA of 3.06 in 17.2 innings. In the postseason, he worked to a 5.27 ERE, though his sole appearance in the championship series was 2.0 innings of scoreless relief.

In the final group stage game of the 2024 Caribbean Series on February 7, Padrón threw a nine-inning no hitter against Gigantes de Rivas of the Nicaraguan League. It was the first no-hitter in Caribbean Series history in over 70 years, since Tommy Fine did so with the Leones del Habana in 1952. In doing so, Padrón became the first pitcher to throw a no-hitter in the modern era of the tournament (post-1970), and the only pitcher of Hispanic origin to do so.
