= Federales de Chiriquí =

Panamanian professional baseball team

- Logo

Information
- League: Probeis
- Location: David, Chiriquí, Panama
- Ballpark: Estadio Kenny Sarracín
- League championships: 2 (2022–23, 2023–24)
- Colors: Red, white

Current uniforms
Home	Away

The Federales de Chiriquí are a professional baseball team in the Panamanian Professional Baseball League, or Probeis. Founded in 2019, the team is based in Panama's western Chiriquí Province.

== History ==
=== Predecessors ===
Federales are the latest professional team to represent Chiriquí Province. Chiriquí-Bocas played in the Panamanian Professional Baseball League for a single season, winning the 1963 Interamerican Series in the only year of its existence. Additionally, they shared the city with Astronautas for a single season (2019–20) before that team moved to Los Santos.

Federales are distinct from Chiriquí's senior league team, one of the most successful teams in the Campeonato Nacional de Beisbol Mayor. Chiriquí has won 17 senior league titles since 1978, including a period of dominance in the 1990s; those teams were managed by Alberto Macré (a former player) and Cuban pilot Frangel Reynaldo, and included stars such as Ernesto Fossatty, Luis Murillo, Rodolfo Aparicio, Virgilio Kaa, and Bienvenido Cedeño.

=== Modern team ===
Federales de Chiriquí represented Panama at the 2021 Caribbean Series, as runners-up of the 2019–20 Probeis season. (Note: The 2020–21 Panamanian Professional Baseball League season was canceled due to the ongoing COVID-19 pandemic. Panama still opted to participate in the Caribbean Series and selected the Federales franchise to represent them in the competition. The team had a mix of players from all four clubs in the league.)

In 2023, the team won a national championship for the first time, and thus represented Panama at the Caribbean Series for the second time in its history; at the 2023 Caribbean Series, the team went 3–4 and did not make to the knockout stage. However, Federales won its third national championship in the 2023–24 season. The team went 5–1 in the group stage 2024 Caribbean Series, losing only to Tiburones de La Guaira; however, they were knocked out in the semifinals by Tigres de Licey, and ended up placing third in the tournament.

== International competition ==
=== Caribbean Series ===
Year	Venue	Finish	Wins	Losses	Win%	Manager
2021	(Mexico) Mazatlán	4th	2	4	.333	(Cuba) Alfonso Urquiola
2023	(Venezuela) Greater Caracas	6th	3	4	.429	(Panama) José Mayorga
2024	(United States) Miami	3rd	5	2	.714	(Panama) José Mayorga
2026	(Mexico) Zapopan	5th	0	4	.429	(Panama) José Mayorga
Total			10	14	.417	
