= José Mayorga =

Panamanian baseball player

- Catcher / Manager
- Born: August 20, 1992 (age 33); Pueblo Nuevo, Panama City, Panama
- Bats: Right Throws: Right
- Stats at Baseball Reference

José Agustin Mayorga (born August 20, 1992) is a Panamanian professional baseball coach and former player who is the current manager of the Vancouver Canadians of the Northwest League. He has also managed the Panama national baseball team and the Federales de Chiriquí of the Panamanian Professional Baseball League.

== Career ==
Signing with the Philadelphia Phillies as an international free agent on May 13, 2010, Mayorga spent five years in the Phillies system. He spent three years with the VSL Phillies of the Venezuelan Summer League, hitting .284 in his final season in 2012, before being promoted to the Rookie-level Gulf Coast Phillies the next year, hitting .196. With the Low-A Lakewood Blue Claws, he hit .286 in 2014. Splitting time between Lakewood and High-A Clearwater, Mayorga hit .192 in his final year in the minors.

Mayorga joined the Toronto Blue Jays organization as a bench coach for the Vancouver Canadians in 2018 and the FCL Blue Jays in 2021. He went to manage the FCL Blue Jays for the 2022 and 2023 season, and the Dunedin Blue Jays in 2024. In 2025, he returned to manage the Vancouver Canadians.

In March 2022, Mayorga was named manager of the Federales de Chiriquí, replacing Alfonso Urquiola. He led Federales to league championships in 2022–23 and 2023–24, and also managed the team at the 2023 and 2024 Caribbean Series. He became the youngest manager to ever win a professional baseball championship in the country.

Mayorga was named manager of the Panama national baseball team for the 2024 WBSC Premier12. The team's fifth place finish was the best result for Panama's senior team since the 2003 Baseball World Cup. In April 2025, it was announced he would continue as manager for the 2026 World Baseball Classic.

At the 2026 WBC, Panama went 1–3 and was relegated to the qualifiers after losing to Colombia on the final day of pool play. During the game, Mayorga was involved in an altercation with player Jonathan Araúz, who had strong words from his manager after getting thrown out at first base; on returning to the dugout, Araúz had to be physically restrained by members of the coaching staff and separated from Mayorga.
