= Estadio Kenny Sarracín =

Coordinates: 8°26′38″N 82°25′25″W

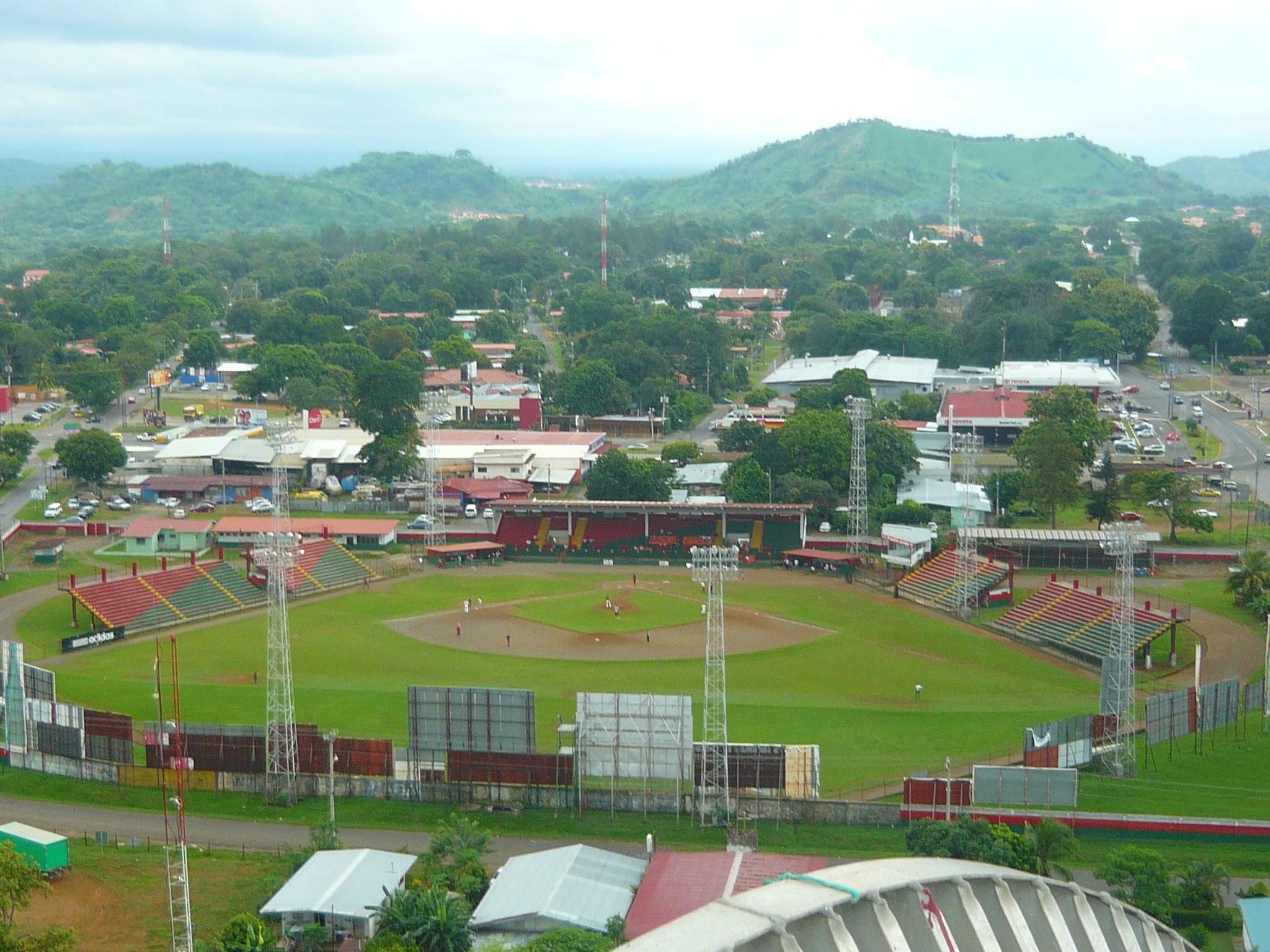
Estadio Kenny Serracín

Estadio Kenny Serracín is a multi-use stadium in David, Panama. It is currently used for baseball matches and is the home stadium of the Federales de Chiriquí baseball team. As of 2018, the stadium holds 8,500 people.

== History ==
The stadium was initially constructed in 1952 and named Plaza Bolivar field, before later being renamed 3 de Noviembre stadium. In 1976 the stadium was again renamed, in honor of baseball player Kenny Serracín, best known for representing Chiriqui in their first Panamanian National Baseball Championship appearance in 1944.

Atletico Chiriqui soccer team briefly played in Estadio Kenny Serracín during the renovation of San Crístobal Stadium.
