= 2024 Caribbean Series =

2024 baseball tournament

Tournament details
- Country: United States
- City: Miami
- Venue: LoanDepot Park
- Dates: February 1 – February 9, 2024
- Teams: 7

Final positions
- Champions: (Venezuela) Tiburones de la Guaira (1st title)
- Runners-up: (Dominican Republic) Tigres del Licey
- Third place: (Panama) Federales de Chiriquí
- Fourth place: Curaçao Suns

Tournament statistics
- Games played: 25
- Attendance: 340,325 (13,613 per game)

Awards
- MVP: (Venezuela) Ricardo Pinto (Tiburones de la Guaira)

The 2024 Caribbean Series was the 66th edition of the Caribbean Series club baseball tournament, played from February 1 to February 9, 2024 at LoanDepot Park in Miami, Florida, United States. This was the first time since the 1991 series that the Caribbean Series was held outside of Latin America, as well as the first Caribbean Series that was held at a Major League Baseball park.

The series brought together the champions of seven professional baseball leagues: the four full members of the Caribbean Professional Baseball Confederation (Dominican Republic, Mexico, Puerto Rico, and Venezuela) plus three guests (Curaçao, Nicaragua, and Panama).

Tiburones de la Guaira won their first championship, representing Venezuela.

== Summary ==
On February 3, the game between the Tigres del Licey and Criollos de Caguas had an attendance of 35,972 fans; the highest attendance ever for a Caribbean Series game.

On February 7, Ángel Padrón of the Tiburones de La Guaira completed a no-hitter against Gigantes de Rivas. It was the first no-hitter since the 1952 Caribbean Series, the second ever in the tournament's history, and the first thrown by a pitcher of Hispanic origin.

On February 9, the Championship Game between Tigres and Tiburones was played in front of 36,677 fans; breaking the record from February 3rd.

== Tournament format ==
A single round-robin format was used; each team faced each other once. The four teams with the best records advanced to the semifinals (1st vs. 4th and 2nd vs. 3rd). The two losers met in the 3rd place match and the two winners met in the final to decide the tournament champion.

== Participating teams ==
Team	Manager	Means of qualification
(Mexico) Naranjeros de Hermosillo	(Mexico) Juan Castro	Winners of the 2023–24 Mexican Pacific League
(Panama) Federales de Chiriquí	(Panama) José Mayorga	Winners of the 2023–24 Panamanian Professional Baseball League
(Puerto Rico) Criollos de Caguas	(Puerto Rico) Yadier Molina	Winners of the 2023–24 Puerto Rican Professional Baseball League
(Dominican Republic) Tigres del Licey	(Dominican Republic) Gilbert Gómez	Winners of the 2023–24 Dominican Professional Baseball League
(Venezuela) Tiburones de La Guaira	(Venezuela) Ozzie Guillén	Winners of the 2023–24 Venezuelan Professional Baseball League
(Nicaragua) Gigantes de Rivas	(Nicaragua) Marvin Benard	Winners of the 2023–24 Nicaraguan Professional Baseball League
Curaçao Suns	(Curaçao) Hainley Statia	Winners of the 2023 Curaçao Professional Baseball League

== Preliminary round ==
Pos	Team	Pld	W	L	RF	RA	RD	PCT	GB	Qualification
1	(Venezuela) Tiburones de La Guaira	6	5	1	29	14	+15	.833 (Note: Head-to-head: Tiburones 1-0; Federales 0-1)	—	Advance to knockout stage
2	(Panama) Federales de Chiriquí	6	5	1	33	22	+11	.833	—	Advance to knockout stage
3	(Dominican Republic) Tigres del Licey	6	3	3	15	21	−6	.500 (Note: Head-to-head: Tigres 2-0; Suns 1-1; Criollos 0-2)	2	Advance to knockout stage
4	Curaçao Suns	6	3	3	19	21	−2	.500	2	Advance to knockout stage
5	(Puerto Rico) Criollos de Caguas	6	3	3	22	20	+2	.500	2	
6	(Mexico) Naranjeros de Hermosillo	6	2	4	23	21	+2	.333	3	
7	(Nicaragua) Gigantes de Rivas	6	0	6	14	36	−22	.000	5	

Rules for classification: 1) Wins; 2) Head-to-head matches; 3) Team quality balance; 4) Batting average; 5) Drawing of lots.
Notes:

Time zone: Time in Florida (UTC−05:00)

Game	Date	Time	Away	Result	Home	Stadium
1	February 1	10:30	Gigantes de Rivas (Nicaragua)	2−5	(Puerto Rico) Criollos de Caguas	LoanDepot Park (7,724)
2	February 1	15:30	Curaçao Suns	6−5	(Mexico) Naranjeros de Hermosillo	LoanDepot Park (5,763)
3	February 1	20:30	Tiburones de La Guaira (Venezuela)	3−1	(Dominican Republic) Tigres del Licey	LoanDepot Park (27,338)
4	February 2	10:30	Federales de Chiriquí (Panama)	7−3	Curaçao Suns	LoanDepot Park (4,887)
5	February 2	15:30	Tigres del Licey (Dominican Republic)	5−4	(Nicaragua) Gigantes de Rivas	LoanDepot Park (10,710)
6	February 2	20:30	Criollos de Caguas (Puerto Rico)	2−0	(Mexico) Naranjeros de Hermosillo	LoanDepot Park (11,816)
7	February 3	10:30	Tiburones de La Guaira (Venezuela)	4−2	Curaçao Suns	LoanDepot Park (10,512)
8	February 3	15:30	Naranjeros de Hermosillo (Mexico)	3−4	(Panama) Federales de Chiriquí	LoanDepot Park (7,034)
9	February 3	20:30	Tigres del Licey (Dominican Republic)	5−2	(Puerto Rico) Criollos de Caguas	LoanDepot Park (35,972)
10	February 4	10:30	Federales de Chiriquí (Panama)	6−3	(Nicaragua) Gigantes de Rivas	LoanDepot Park (12,342)
11	February 4	15:30	Criollos de Caguas (Puerto Rico)	6−2	(Venezuela) Tiburones de La Guaira	LoanDepot Park (32,092)
12	February 4	20:30	Naranjeros de Hermosillo (Mexico)	9−1	(Dominican Republic) Tigres del Licey	LoanDepot Park (14,308)
13	February 5	10:30	Gigantes de Rivas (Nicaragua)	3−6	Curaçao Suns	LoanDepot Park (5,225)
14	February 5	15:30	Tiburones de La Guaira (Venezuela)	6−1	(Mexico) Naranjeros de Hermosillo	LoanDepot Park (9,021)
15	February 5	20:30	Criollos de Caguas (Puerto Rico)	7−9	(Panama) Federales de Chiriquí	LoanDepot Park (7,218)
16	February 6	10:30	Naranjeros de Hermosillo (Mexico)	5−2	(Nicaragua) Gigantes de Rivas	LoanDepot Park (6,267)
17	February 6	15:30	Curaçao Suns	0−2	(Dominican Republic) Tigres del Licey	LoanDepot Park (8,761)
18	February 6	20:30	Federales de Chiriquí (Panama)	4−5	(Venezuela) Tiburones de La Guaira	LoanDepot Park (11,801)
19	February 7	10:30	Curaçao Suns	2−0	(Puerto Rico) Criollos de Caguas	LoanDepot Park (6,870)
20	February 7	15:30	Tigres del Licey (Dominican Republic)	1−3	(Panama) Federales de Chiriquí	LoanDepot Park (8,817)
21	February 7	20:30	Gigantes de Rivas (Nicaragua)	0−9	(Venezuela) Tiburones de La Guaira	LoanDepot Park (13,488)

== Knockout stage ==
Semi-finals
1	(Venezuela) Tiburones de La Guaira	6
4	Curaçao Suns	2
2	(Panama) Federales de Chiriquí	1
3	(Dominican Republic) Tigres del Licey	4

Final
1	(Venezuela) Tiburones de La Guaira	3
3	(Dominican Republic) Tigres del Licey	0
Third-place play-off
2	(Panama) Federales de Chiriquí	5
4	Curaçao Suns	4

=== Semi-finals ===
Game	Date	Time	Away	Result	Home	Stadium
22	February 8	15:00	Tigres del Licey (Dominican Republic)	4−1	(Panama) Federales de Chiriquí	LoanDepot Park (14,265)
23	February 8	20:00	Curaçao Suns	2−6	(Venezuela) Tiburones de La Guaira	LoanDepot Park (20,459)

=== Third-place play-off ===
Game	Date	Time	Away	Result	Home	Stadium
24	February 9	15:00	Curaçao Suns	4−5	(Panama) Federales de Chiriquí	LoanDepot Park (10,958)

=== Final ===
Game 25 February 9, 2024 20:00 at LoanDepot Park in Miami, Florida
Team	1	2	3	4	5	6	7	8	9	R	H	E
(Dominican Republic) Tigres del Licey	0	0	0	0	0	0	0	0	0	0	6	0
(Venezuela) Tiburones de La Guaira	0	0	0	1	2	0	0	0	X	3	9	0
WP: Ricardo Pinto (1-0) LP: Cesar Valdez (0-1); Attendance: 36,677; Boxscore

== Statistical leaders ==
The following tables do not include statistics from the knockout stage.

=== Batting ===
Statistic	Name		Total/Avg
Batting average*	(Venezuela) Alexi Amarista	(Venezuela) Tiburones de La Guaira	.474
Hits	3 tied with (Note: Agustín Murillo, Emilio Bonifacio, Dawel Lugo)		10
Runs	(Panama) Jhonny Yussef Santos	(Panama) Federales de Chiriquí	7
Home runs	5 tied with (Note: Aaron Altherr, Wladimir Balentien, Julián Ornelas, Iván Herrera)		2
Runs batted in	2 tied with (Note: Aaron Altherr, Iván Herrera)		8
Stolen bases	(Venezuela) Hernán Pérez	(Venezuela) Tiburones de La Guaira	4
On-base percentage*	(Panama) Iván Herrera	(Panama) Federales de Chiriquí	.556
Slugging percentage*	(Panama) Jhonny Yussef Santos	(Panama) Federales de Chiriquí	.833
OPS*	(Germany) Aaron Altherr	(Mexico) Naranjeros de Hermosillo	1.308

* Minimum 2.7 plate appearances per team game

=== Pitching ===
Statistic	Name	Team	Total/Avg
ERA	9 tied with (Note: Zach Matson, Anthony Vizcaya, Anthony Castro, Jorgan Cavanerio, Alex Claudio, Chavez Fernander, Severino González, Heitor Tokar, Ronald Ramirez, Leo Crawford)		0.00
Saves	(Venezuela) Arnaldo Jose Hernandez	(Venezuela) Tiburones de La Guaira	3
Innings pitched	(Venezuela) Ángel Padrón	(Venezuela) Tiburones de La Guaira	12.1
Strikeouts	2 tied with (Note: Raúl Valdés, Jorge Martinez)		10
WHIP*	(Venezuela) Anthony Vizcaya	(Venezuela) Tiburones de La Guaira	0.25

* Minimum 0.8 innings pitched per team game

== Awards ==
All-Tournament Team
Pos.	Player	Team
SP	(Venezuela) Ángel Padrón	(Venezuela) Tiburones de La Guaira
RP	(Dominican Republic) Jairo Asencio	(Dominican Republic) Tigres del Licey
C	(Panama) Iván Herrera	(Panama) Federales de Chiriquí
1B	(Venezuela) Hernán Pérez	(Venezuela) Tiburones de La Guaira
2B	(Dominican Republic) Robinson Canó	(Dominican Republic) Tigres del Licey
3B	(Dominican Republic) Dawel Lugo	(Dominican Republic) Tigres del Licey
SS	(Puerto Rico) Jack López	(Puerto Rico) Criollos de Caguas
OF	(Germany) Aaron Altherr	(Mexico) Naranjeros de Hermosillo
OF	(Venezuela) Alexi Amarista	(Venezuela) Tiburones de La Guaira
OF	(Curaçao) Wladimir Balentien	Curaçao Suns
DH	(Puerto Rico) Nelson Velázquez	(Puerto Rico) Criollos de Caguas
Man.	(Panama) José Mayorga	(Panama) Federales de Chiriquí
