= Rubén Tejada =

Panamanian baseball player (born 1989)

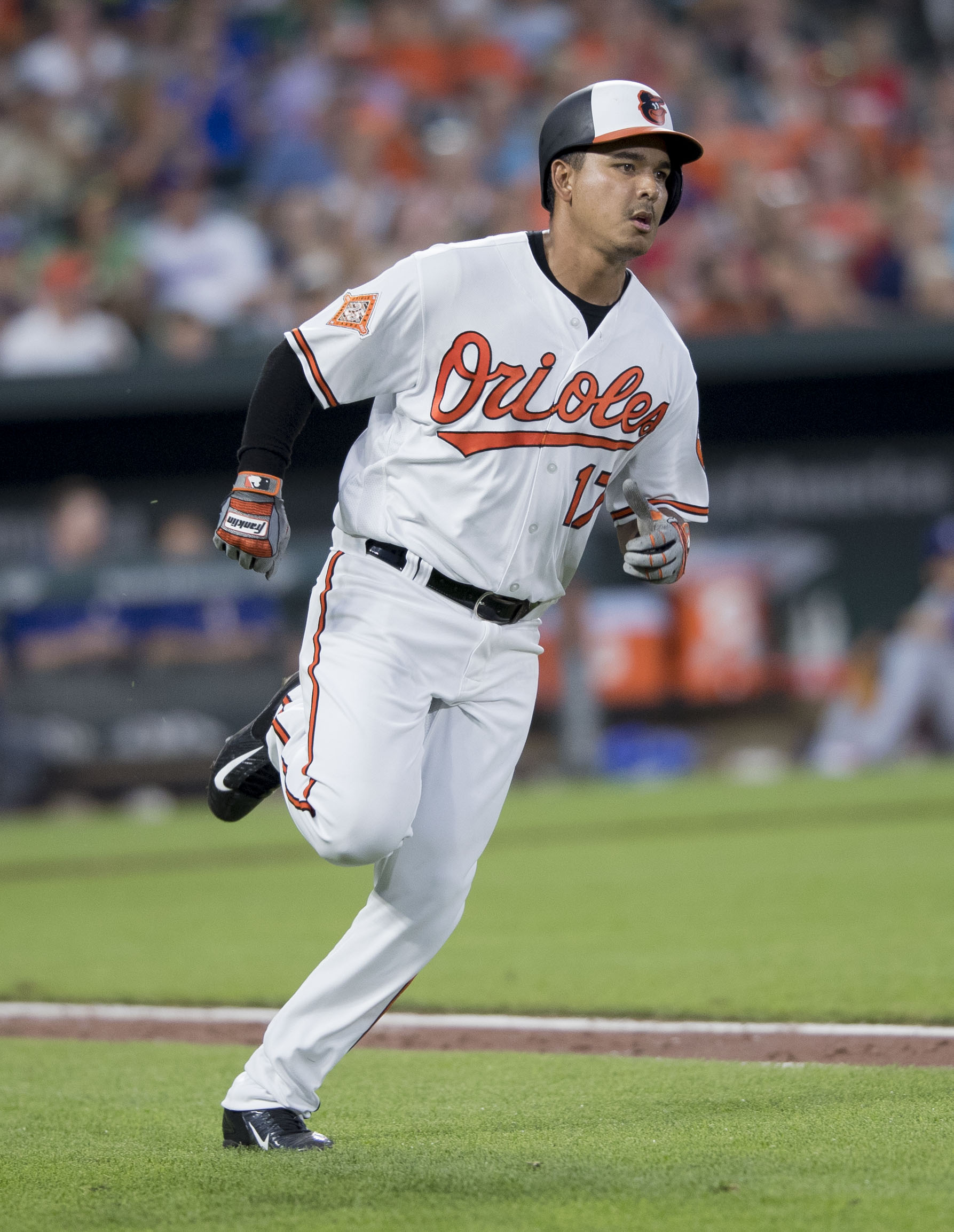
- Tejada with the Baltimore Orioles in 2017
- Shortstop
- Born: October 27, 1989 (age 37); Santiago de Veraguas, Panama
- Batted: Right Threw: Right

MLB debut
- April 7, 2010, for the New York Mets

Last MLB appearance
- August 20, 2019, for the New York Mets

MLB statistics
- Batting average: .250
- Hits: 530
- Home runs: 10
- Runs batted in: 158
- Stats at Baseball Reference

Teams
- New York Mets (2010–2015); St. Louis Cardinals (2016); San Francisco Giants (2016); Baltimore Orioles (2017); New York Mets (2019)

Rubén Darío Tejada Abrego (born October 27, 1989) is a Panamanian former professional baseball shortstop. He has previously played in Major League Baseball (MLB) for the New York Mets, St. Louis Cardinals, San Francisco Giants, and Baltimore Orioles.

== Early life ==
Tejada was born in Santiago de Veraguas in western Panama to Rubén Sr., a mechanic, and Donaji Tejada, a secretary. Tejada also has a younger brother, Ernie. Tejada grew up mere feet away from Omar Torrijos Herrera Stadium where his father was also a pitcher for Los Indios de Veraguas.

Growing up, Tejada's favorite baseball players were shortstops Derek Jeter and Omar Vizquel. In 2001, Tejada played for the Santiago de Veraguas Little League team which represented the Latin American region at the Little League World Series. In 2003, at 13 years old, Tejada began playing for Los Indios de Veraguas’ junior team as a pitcher.

== Professional career ==
=== New York Mets ===
==== Minor leagues ====
Tejada signed with the New York Mets as an international free agent in 2006. He debuted in professional baseball in 2007. Tejeda has played for the Gulf Coast League Mets, Venezuela Mets, St. Lucie Mets, and Binghamton Mets. He also played for the Surprise Rafters of the Arizona Fall League.

==== 2010 ====
Tejada was invited to spring training with the Mets in 2010. He was the youngest position player on the Mets Opening Day roster since Tim Foli in 1971.

On April 7, 2010 he made his major league debut and went 0-for-2 with a HBP in 3 plate appearances. On April 9, 2010 he recorded his first major league hit off the Washington Nationals' Tyler Walker. On June 4, 2010 the Mets re-called Tejada to replace Luis Castillo. With the activation of Luis Castillo from the DL on July 19, 2010, the Mets optioned Tejada to the Triple-A Buffalo Bisons. He was re-called on August 7, after Alex Cora was released and Jesús Feliciano was demoted to Triple A Buffalo Bisons. On September 5, 2010 in the seventh inning Tejada hit his first major league home run off Cubs pitcher Marcos Mateo on the first pitch.

For the season, he batted .213/.305/.282.

==== 2011 ====
On May 17, 2011 Tejada was called up to play second base, thus moving Justin Turner to third base for the injured David Wright. He ended the season with a .284 batting average in 328 at-bats.

==== 2012 ====
Once Jose Reyes signed with the Miami Marlins, Rubén Tejada became the New York Mets starting shortstop for the 2012 season. On August 1, 2012, Tejada hit his second home run in the majors against Matt Cain of the Giants, his first home run since September 5, 2010.

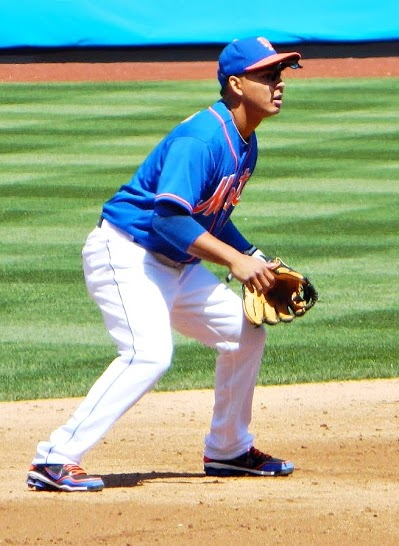
Rubén Tejada playing shortstop

==== 2013 ====
Tejada was placed on the 15-day disabled list with a strained right quad and called up shortstop Omar Quintanilla from the Mets triple-A affiliate Las Vegas 51s to take his spot on the roster. After Quintanilla's unexpected performance however, the Mets optioned Tejada to Las Vegas. For the season, he batted .202/.259/.260.

==== 2015 ====
On October 10, 2015, during the second game of the 2015 National League Division Series, Chase Utley slid into and took out Tejada in an attempt to break up what might have been an inning-ending double play, fracturing Tejada's right fibula in the collision. Utley was ruled safe by the umpires after a video review despite never actually touching the base. The Dodgers, who were losing 2-1 at the time of the incident, rallied to win the game 5-2. Major League Baseball suspended Utley for two games for his conduct "in violation of Official Baseball Rule 5.09 (a) (13), which is designed to protect fielders from precisely this type of rolling block that occurs away from the base." Utley appealed the suspension and remained active for the rest of the Dodgers post-season games. MLB subsequently dropped Utley's suspension on March 6, 2016, with Chief Baseball Officer Joe Torre stating "There wasn't anything clear-cut to say that play violated a rule."

In 2016, Tejada said he hadn't spoken with Utley, though Utley had sent him several gifts. Tejada said what bothers him most about Utley's hit was that it came from a fellow middle infielder. "I would never do that to another infielder. That is the position I play, and I would never want to hurt another player that plays that position like that. It would have been different if some other position player, a corner infielder or an outfielder had done that to me, but he is an middle infielder, he should know better."

==== 2016 ====
On March 15, 2016, the Mets placed Tejada on waivers, and released him the next day after clearing waivers.

=== St. Louis Cardinals ===
On March 19, 2016, Tejada signed a one-year contract worth $1.5 million with the St. Louis Cardinals. Expected to fill in for the injured Jhonny Peralta at shortstop, Tejada himself injured his quad in the final pre-season game, landing on the disabled list to begin the season. Tejada was activated on April 18, but the opening at shortstop was no longer there, having been filled instead by Aledmys Díaz. Tejada made his first major league appearance as a pitcher on May 20 in the ninth inning at Busch Stadium against the Arizona Diamondbacks, pitching one complete inning while allowing two earned runs, on back-to-back home runs to Chris Herrmann and Brandon Drury. The Cardinals designated Tejada for assignment on May 28. He had six hits in 34 at bats. Tejada declined the outright assignment, becoming a free agent.

=== San Francisco Giants ===
On June 13, 2016, Tejada signed a minor league contract with the San Francisco Giants. On June 29, Tejada was called up and started at third base after Matt Duffy was put on the 15-day disabled list. On July 20, he was designated for assignment by San Francisco. For the season, Tejada batted .156/.270/.250 with the Giants in 32 at bats.

=== New York Yankees ===
On December 12, 2016, Tejada signed a minor league contract with the New York Yankees. On March 27, 2017, Tejada was reassigned to Minor League camp.

=== Baltimore Orioles ===
The Baltimore Orioles acquired Tejada from the Yankees in exchange for cash considerations on June 4, 2017. He was assigned to the Triple-A Norfolk Tides. His contract was selected by the Orioles two days later on June 6. Tejada made his Orioles debut the next night against the Pittsburgh Pirates replacing an injured Manny Machado. For the season he batted .230/.293/.283 with the Orioles.

On November 28, 2017, Tejada signed a minor league contract with the Orioles. He played in 101 games for Norfolk, batting .230/.291/.298 with two home runs and 34 RBI. Tejada elected free agency following the season on November 2.

=== New York Mets (second stint) ===
On March 23, 2019, Tejada signed a minor league contract to return to the New York Mets organization and was assigned to the Triple-A Syracuse Mets. He hit for the cycle on June 19, against the Charlotte Knights. On August 14, the Mets selected Tejada's contract. On August 22, Tejada was designated for assignment. He re-signed with the team on a minor league contract on September 1. Tejada elected free agency following the season on November 4.

=== Toronto Blue Jays ===
On January 17, 2020, Tejada signed a minor league deal with the Toronto Blue Jays. He did not play in a game in 2020 due to the cancellation of the minor league season because of the COVID-19 pandemic. Tejada was released by the Blue Jays organization on August 31.

=== Philadelphia Phillies ===
On May 5, 2021, Tejada signed a minor league contract with the Philadelphia Phillies. Tejada played in 72 games for the Triple-A Lehigh Valley IronPigs, hitting .231 with no home runs and 15 RBI. On August 25, Tejada was released by the Phillies organization.

=== Chicago White Sox ===
On September 3, 2021, Tejada signed a minor league deal with the Chicago White Sox. He was assigned to the Triple-A Charlotte Knights. He appeared in 8 games for Charlotte down the stretch, hitting .250/.300/.357 with 1 home run and 5 RBI. He elected free agency following the season on November 7.

=== Long Island Ducks ===
On February 9, 2023, Tejada signed with the Long Island Ducks of the Atlantic League of Professional Baseball. In 78 games for Long Island, Tejada batted .293/.427/.414 with 6 home runs and 35 RBI.

=== Leones de Yucatán ===
On December 28, 2023, Tejada signed with the Leones de Yucatán of the Mexican League. In 73 games for Yucatán in 2024, he slashed .298/.405/.409 with four home runs, 34 RBI, and three stolen bases.

=== Olmecas de Tabasco ===
On December 11, 2024, Tejada was traded to the Olmecas de Tabasco of the Mexican League in exchange for Adeiny Hechavarria. He made 38 appearances for Tabasco in 2025, slashing .225/.365/.252 with no home runs and 13 RBI.

=== Caliente de Durango ===
On July 2, 2025, Tejada was traded to the Caliente de Durango of the Mexican League in exchange for Jimmy Cordero. In 21 appearances for Durango, he hit .286/.383/.386 with no home runs and nine RBI. On January 16, 2026, Tejada was released by the Caliente.

== Coaching career ==
On February 6, 2026, the Philadelphia Phillies hired Tejada to serve as the position coach for their rookie–level affiliate, the Florida Complex League Phillies.

== International career ==
Tejada played for Panama's national baseball team during the 2009 World Baseball Classic, going hitless in four at-bats. At the 2013 World Baseball Classic qualifying tournament, held in Panama City, he slashed a much-improved .313/.353/.500, with three doubles and a walk.

In 2022, Tejada was selected to represent Panama in the qualifiers for the 2023 World Baseball Classic; Panama qualified for the tournament. In the tournament itself, Tejada slashed .333/.375/.667 with five hits in 15 at-bats; was one of the most productive hitters on the Panama squad, with a team-leading OPS of 1.042. However, Pool A ended in a five-way tie, with all five teams finishing with 2-2 records, and Panama was eliminated by tiebreaker.

Tejada was also named to the team for the 2024 WBSC Premier12. In five games, he hit .200 with a .667 slugging percentage, with two home runs and four RBI. After the tournament, the International Testing Agency notified him that he had tested positive for Drostanolone. He was suspended from World Baseball Softball Confederation competition for four years.

== See also ==
- List of Major League Baseball players from Panama
