= Gus Polidor =

Venezuelan baseball player (1961–1995)

- Infielder
- Born: October 26, 1961; Caracas, Venezuela
- Died: April 28, 1995 (aged 33); Caracas, Venezuela
- Batted: Right Threw: Right

MLB debut
- September 7, 1985, for the California Angels

Last MLB appearance
- July 22, 1993, for the Florida Marlins

MLB statistics
- Batting average: .207
- Home runs: 2
- Runs batted in: 35
- Stats at Baseball Reference

Teams
- California Angels (1985–1988); Milwaukee Brewers (1989–1990); Florida Marlins (1993)

Gustavo Adolfo Polidor González [poh-lee-dor'] (October 26, 1961 – April 28, 1995) was a Venezuelan professional baseball shortstop who played for the California Angels (1985–88), Milwaukee Brewers (1989–90) and Florida Marlins (1993). He was born in Caracas, Venezuela.

== Career ==
Polidor played infield for the Holyoke Millers of the Eastern League (Holyoke, MA) in 1981 and 1982. In 1981 he hit for a batting average of .248.

His best year was 1987 with the Angels, when he hit for a .263 batting average, with 2 homers and 15 RBI in 137 at bats. After dropping off to .148 in 1988 he was traded to the Brewers. Polidor played in a career-high 79 games in 1989 and was later a member of the Marlins in their 1993 inaugural season.

In his major league career, Polidor batted .207, with 2 home runs, 35 runs batted in, 33 runs scored, 15 doubles and 3 stolen bases.

Polidor made a brief comeback attempt as a replacement player with the Montreal Expos in spring training of 1995. Less than a month later, he was murdered in Caracas as he tried to protect his son from two men who were trying to steal his car. He was 33 years old.

== See also ==
- List of Major League Baseball players from Venezuela
