= Ángel Bravo =

Venezuelan baseball player (born 1942)

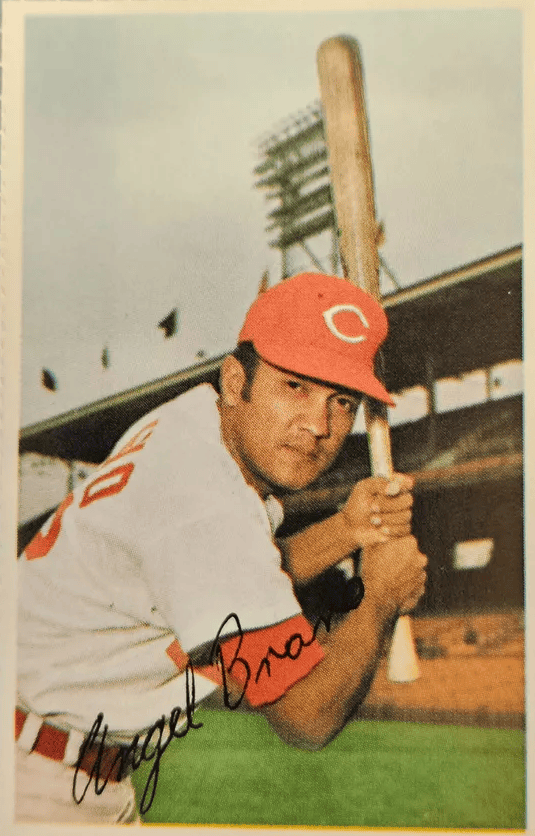
- Bravo in 1971
- Outfielder
- Born: August 4, 1942 (age 84); Maracaibo, Venezuela
- Batted: Left Threw: Left

MLB debut
- June 6, 1969, for the Chicago White Sox

Last MLB appearance
- September 4, 1971, for the San Diego Padres

MLB statistics
- Batting average: .248
- Home runs: 1
- Runs batted in: 12
- Stats at Baseball Reference

Teams
- Chicago White Sox (1969); Cincinnati Reds (1970–1971); San Diego Padres (1971)

Member of the Venezuelan

Baseball Hall of Fame
- Induction: 2010

Ángel Alfonso Bravo Urdaneta (born August 4, 1942) is a Venezuelan former professional baseball center fielder.

== Career ==
He was signed by the Chicago White Sox as an amateur free agent before the 1963 season, and played in Major League Baseball (MLB) for the White Sox (1969), Cincinnati Reds (1970–1971) and San Diego Padres (1971). A native of Maracaibo, Zulia, he batted and threw left-handed.

Bravo posted a career average of .248 (54-for-218) with one home run and 12 RBI, including 26 runs, seven doubles, three triples, and two stolen bases in 149 games played.

== See also ==
- List of players from Venezuela in Major League Baseball

== Sources ==
- 1971 Baseball Register published by The Sporting News
