= Johnny Jeter (baseball) =

American baseball player (1944–2024)

- Outfielder
- Born: October 24, 1944; Shreveport, Louisiana, U.S.
- Died: January 16, 2024 (aged 79); Shreveport, Louisiana, U.S.
- Batted: Right Threw: Right

MLB debut
- June 14, 1969, for the Pittsburgh Pirates

Last MLB appearance
- September 14, 1974, for the Cleveland Indians

MLB statistics
- Batting average: .244
- Home runs: 18
- Runs batted in: 69
- Stats at Baseball Reference

Teams
- Pittsburgh Pirates (1969–1970); San Diego Padres (1971–1972); Chicago White Sox (1973); Cleveland Indians (1974)

John Jeter (October 24, 1944 – January 16, 2024) was an American professional baseball player, an outfielder who played 336 games of Major League Baseball for four teams — the Pittsburgh Pirates, San Diego Padres, Chicago White Sox and Cleveland Indians — between 1969 and 1974. Jeter was an alumnus of Grambling State University. He threw and batted right-handed, stood 6 feet 1 inch (1.85 m) tall and weighed 180 pounds (82 kg).

During his Major League career, Jeter collected 213 hits, including 27 doubles, ten triples and 18 home runs.

He was the father of former Major League outfielder Shawn Jeter. Jeter died on January 16, 2024.
