= Marvin Benard =

Nicaraguan baseball player (born 1971)

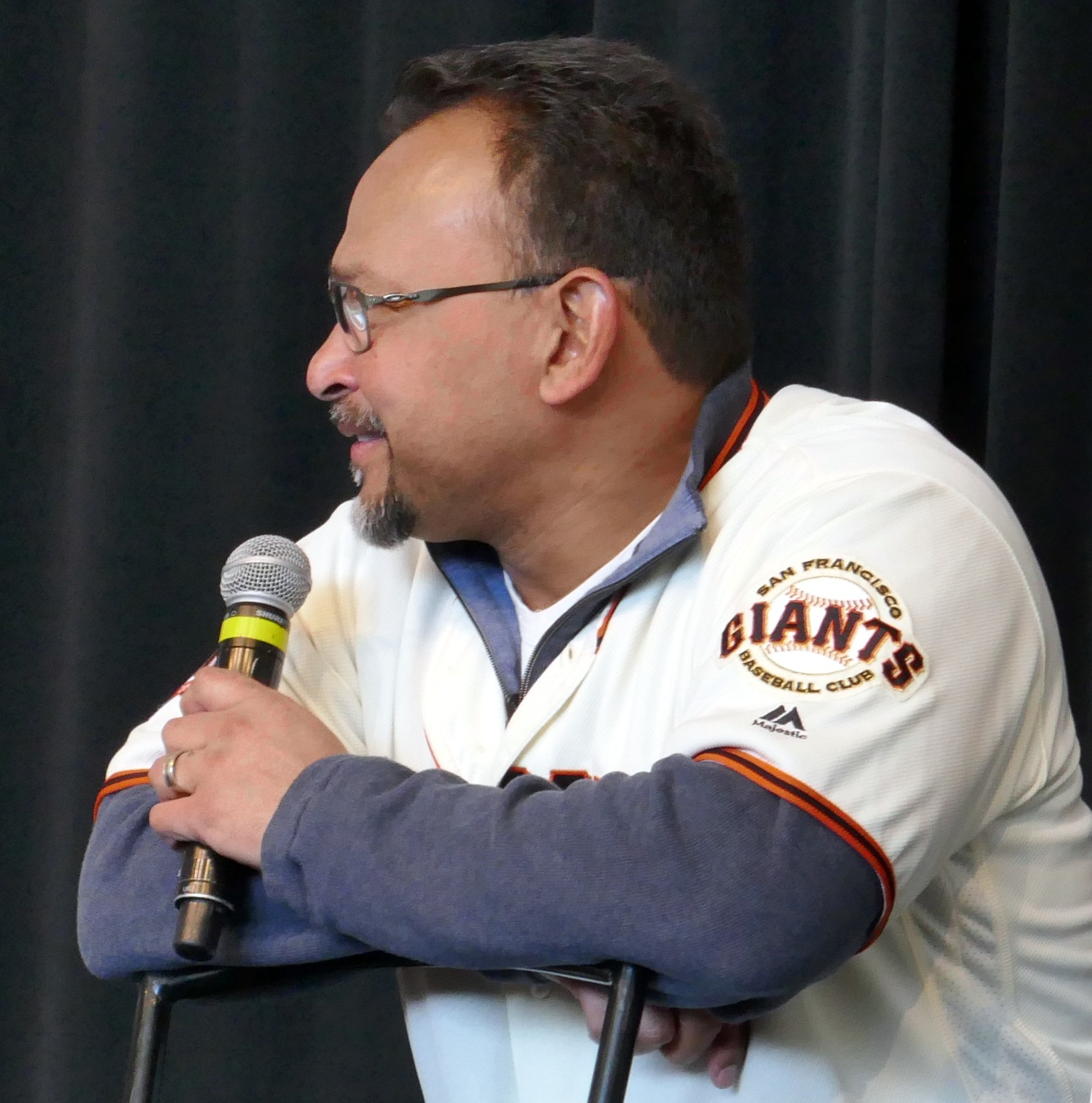
- Benard in 2018
- Outfielder
- Born: January 20, 1971 (age 55); Bluefields, Nicaragua
- Batted: Left Threw: Left

MLB debut
- September 5, 1995, for the San Francisco Giants

Last MLB appearance
- September 27, 2003, for the San Francisco Giants

MLB statistics
- Batting average: .271
- Home runs: 54
- Runs batted in: 260
- Stats at Baseball Reference

Teams
- San Francisco Giants (1995–2003)

Career highlights and awards
- San Francisco Giants Wall of Fame

Marvin Larry Benard (born January 20, 1971) is a Nicaraguan professional baseball manager and former outfielder. He played in Major League Baseball (MLB) for the San Francisco Giants. He has also managed the Nicaraguan national team as well as Gigantes de Rivas in the 2024 Caribbean Series.

== Early life ==
Marvin Larry Benard was born on January 20, 1971, in Bluefields, Nicaragua.

== Professional career ==
=== San Francisco Giants (1995–2003) ===
Benard played with the San Francisco Giants from 1995 to 2003. He was a starter from 1999 to 2001, and played most of the 1996 season due to an injury to Glenallen Hill. He won the 1999 Willie Mac Award for his spirit and leadership. Despite a disappointing postseason performance in 2000, Marvin had one of the most memorable hits of series, driving in Ellis Burks with an RBI single in Game 3 of the 2000 National League Division Series.

Benard had above-average power for a leadoff hitter. A notorious first-pitch hitter prone to striking out, Benard had good bat speed and could steal bases, though he was caught stealing 29% of the time over the course of his career. He played all three outfield positions, mostly as a center fielder. As a pinch hitter, he had a career .267 batting average. Benard hit the final San Francisco Giants home run in the history of Candlestick Park, which came in the first inning of the Giants' eventual 9–4 loss to the Los Angeles Dodgers.

=== Chicago White Sox ===
After becoming a free agent after the 2003 season, Benard agreed to a minor-league contract with the Chicago White Sox but was released before the season began.

=== Toronto Blue Jays ===
Benard then signed with the Toronto Blue Jays. He was released after one season with the Triple-A Syracuse Chiefs, hitting .211 with four homers and 18 RBI in 33 games.

== Post-retirement ==
On April 11, 2010, Benard admitted to using steroids during the 2002 season in which the Giants reached the World Series.

=== Coaching career ===
Benard was employed as a hitting coach for the San Diego Padres' short-season Class A Northwest League affiliate, the Tri-City Dust Devils, for the 2015 season. In 2016 he managed the Nicaragua national baseball team. He is currently employed as a color commentator for the Giants' Spanish-language radio broadcasts, working road games alongside Erwin Higueros.

Benard managed Gigantes de Rivas, champions of the 2023–24 Nicaraguan Professional Baseball League, at the 2024 Caribbean Series (taking over from Germán Mesa). He drew criticism after making comments criticizing the heart of his team, saying "I'm going to get in trouble for saying this... the Nicaraguan baseball player is a conformist. I try to motivate them, but they can't get it out of their heads." The Nicaraguan team finished the tournament in last place with a 0–6 record, being eliminated in the first round.

== Personal life ==
Benard moved to Los Angeles with his mother and father when he was 12. After a stellar prep career at Bell High School, he attended El Camino College (Torrance, CA) freshman year. After his Head Coach Tom Hicks stepped down, Benard transferred to L.A. Harbor Junior College in Wilmington, Calif., then Lewis-Clark State College in Lewiston, Idaho.

His son, Isaac, was drafted by the Tampa Bay Rays in the 23rd round of the 2016 Amateur Draft and was a member of the Princeton Rays in the Appalachian League, where he hit .255 with 3 home runs and 3 stolen bases in 110 at-bats.

He is the cousin of actor, Maurice Benard.

== See also ==
- List of Major League Baseball players named in the Mitchell Report
