= Jonathan Araúz =

Panamanian baseball player (born 1998)

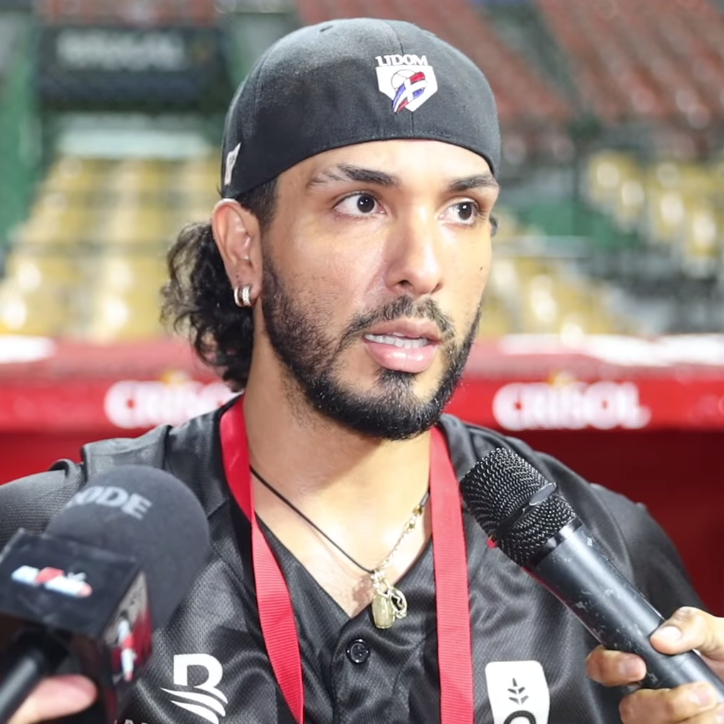
- Araúz with the Leones del Escogido in 2025

Tecolotes de los Dos Laredos – No. 24
- Shortstop / Second baseman
- Born: August 3, 1998 (age 28); Alanje, Panama
- Bats: Switch Throws: Right

MLB debut
- July 24, 2020, for the Boston Red Sox

MLB statistics (through 2023 season)
- Batting average: .184
- Home runs: 8
- Runs batted in: 31
- Stats at Baseball Reference

Teams
- Boston Red Sox (2020–2022); Baltimore Orioles (2022); New York Mets (2023)

Jonathan Aldair Araúz (/ɑːrɑːˈuz/ ah-rah-OOZ; born August 3, 1998) is a Panamanian professional baseball shortstop and second baseman for the Tecolotes de los Dos Laredos of the Mexican League. He has previously played in Major League Baseball (MLB) for the Boston Red Sox, Baltimore Orioles, and New York Mets. Listed at 6 feet 0 inches (1.83 m) and 150 pounds (68 kg), he throws right-handed and is a switch hitter.

== Playing career ==
=== Philadelphia Phillies ===
Araúz signed with the Philadelphia Phillies as an international free agent on August 7, 2014. He played for the Gulf Coast League Phillies in 2015, hitting .254/.309/.370/.679 with 2 home runs and 18 RBI.

=== Houston Astros ===
On December 12, 2015, the Phillies traded Araúz and Ken Giles to the Houston Astros in exchange for Brett Oberholtzer, Harold Araúz, Mark Appel, Thomas Eshelman, and Vince Velasquez.

Araúz played for the Greeneville Astros in 2016, hitting .249/.323/.338/.661 with 2 home runs and 18 RBI. Araúz was suspended for 50 games at the beginning of the 2017 season, after testing positive for methamphetamine. He split the 2017 season between the Tri-City ValleyCats and the Quad Cities River Bandits, hitting a combined .242/.336/.319/.655 with 1 home run and 15 RBI. He split the 2018 season between Quad Cities and the Buies Creek Astros, hitting a combined .229/.305/.373/.678 with 8 home runs and 47 RBI. Araúz split the 2019 season between the Fayetteville Woodpeckers and the Corpus Christi Hooks, combining to hit .249/.319/.388/.707 with 11 home runs and 55 RBI.

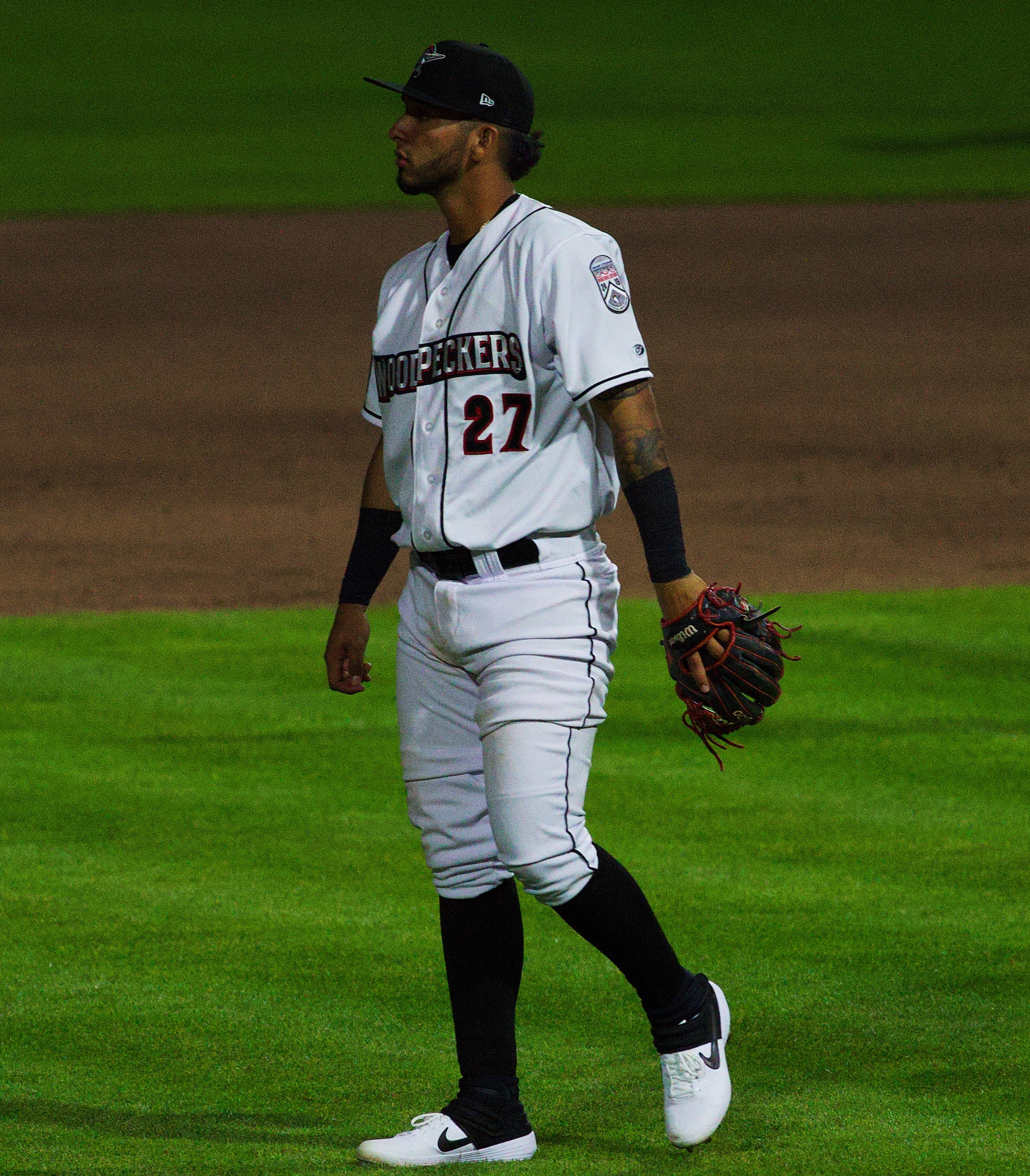
Araúz with the Fayetteville Woodpeckers in 2019

=== Boston Red Sox ===
On December 12, 2019, Araúz was selected by the Boston Red Sox in the 2019 Rule 5 draft. On July 24, 2020, he made his MLB debut with the Red Sox in the team's first game of the 2020 season, batting as a pinch hitter against the Baltimore Orioles. He made his first MLB start on July 30, against the New York Mets, and collected his first MLB hit on August 10, against the Tampa Bay Rays. Overall with the 2020 Red Sox, Araúz batted .250 with one home run and 9 RBIs in 25 games. After the 2020 season, he played for Panama in the 2021 Caribbean Series, batting .269 in six games.

Araúz began the 2021 season in Triple-A, with the Worcester Red Sox. He was called up to Boston during May, July, and August. On September 10, Araúz was placed on the COVID-related injured list. He was activated on September 23 and optioned to Worcester. Araúz played in a total of 28 games for Boston, batting .185 (12-for-65) with three home runs and 8 RBIs. He also appeared in 68 games for Worcester, batting .245 with six home runs and 30 RBIs.

Araúz made Boston's Opening Day roster in 2022, capturing one of the final reserve spots. He was placed on the COVID-related list on April 19. On May 12, he was removed from the COVID-related list and optioned to Worcester. Araúz was recalled by Boston on June 8, when Kiké Hernández was placed on the injured list. Araúz was then designated for assignment by Boston on June 10. In six games for Boston, he was hitless in 10 at bats. He also played in 24 games for Triple-A Worcester, batting .185 with three RBIs and no home runs.

=== Baltimore Orioles ===
On June 15, 2022, Araúz was claimed off of waivers by the Baltimore Orioles. He was then assigned to the Triple-A Norfolk Tides. He was designated for assignment on September 6, then assigned to Triple-A Norfolk three day later. In nine games with the Orioles, he batted .179 (5-for-28) with one home run and four RBIs. He also played in 11 games for Triple-A Norfolk, batting .250 (10-for-40), and three rehabilitation games in High-A, batting .100 (1-for-10).

=== New York Mets ===
On December 7, 2022, the New York Mets selected Araúz in the minor league phase of the Rule 5 draft. In 95 games for the Triple–A Syracuse Mets, he batted .244/.344/.429 with a career–high 14 home runs and 49 RBI. On August 2, 2023, the Mets selected Araúz's contract, adding him to their major league roster. In 27 games for New York, he batted .136/.203/.288 and tied career–highs in home runs (3) and RBI (9). Following the season on October 20, Araúz was removed from the 40–man roster and sent outright to Triple–A Syracuse, but refused the assignment and elected free agency on October 24.

=== Los Angeles Dodgers ===
On December 15, 2023, Araúz signed a minor league contract with the Los Angeles Dodgers and he was assigned to the Triple–A Oklahoma City Baseball Club to start the season, where he batted .227 with three home runs, 21 RBI, and two stolen bases in 60 games. Araúz was released by the Dodgers organization on July 2, 2024.

=== Saraperos de Saltillo ===
On June 3, 2025, Araúz signed with the Saraperos de Saltillo of the Mexican League. In 40 appearances for the Saraperos, he batted .310/.437/.548 with five home runs, 26 RBI, and three stolen bases. Araúz was released by Saltillo on January 24, 2026.

=== Tecolotes de los Dos Laredos ===
On May 1, 2026, Araúz signed with the Sioux City Explorers of the American Association of Professional Baseball. However, on June 3, he signed with the Tecolotes de los Dos Laredos of the Mexican League without ever appearing for Sioux City.

== International career ==
Araúz was selected to represent Panama at the 2023 World Baseball Classic qualification. In eight plate appearances over two games, he registered one hit and four walks as Panama qualified for the 2023 World Baseball Classic. At the 2023 WBC, he hit .267 with three walks, four hits, and three runs batted in over three games.

Araúz was again named to the Panama roster for the 2026 World Baseball Classic. Over Panama's four pool play games, he made five plate appearances, going hitless with one walk and a run scored. In the team's last game, a 4–3 loss to Colombia on March 9, he made a ninth inning pinch-hit appearance for Allen Córdoba, grounding out to second base. On returning to the dugout, a verbal altercation erupted between Araúz and manager José Mayorga, which led to members of the coaching staff having to physically restrain him.

== See also ==
- Rule 5 draft results
