= Shawn Jeter =

American baseball player (born 1966)

- Outfield
- Born: June 28, 1966 (age 59); Shreveport, Louisiana, U.S.
- Batted: Left Threw: Right

MLB debut
- June 13, 1992, for the Chicago White Sox

Last MLB appearance
- October 4, 1992, for the Chicago White Sox

MLB statistics
- Batting average: .111
- Home runs: 0
- Runs batted in: 0
- Stats at Baseball Reference

Teams
- Chicago White Sox (1992)

Shawn Darrell Jeter (born June 28, 1966) is an American former professional baseball outfielder who played for the Chicago White Sox in Major League Baseball (MLB) in 1992. He is the son of former MLB outfielder Johnny Jeter.

== Career ==
The Toronto Blue Jays drafted Jeter in the seventh round of the 1985 MLB draft. He was a Florida State League All-Star in 1987. The Blue Jays traded him and a player to be named later to the Chicago White Sox for outfielder Cory Snyder on July 14, 1991.

Jeter made his MLB debut with the White Sox on June 13, 1992 and appeared in his final game on October 4. He played in Triple-A in 1993, then was a replacement player for the Cleveland Indians during the MLB Players Association strike during spring training prior to the 1995 season. He played for Saraperos de Saltillo in the Mexican League in 1995, then the Saskatoon Smokin' Guns of the independent Prairie League in 1997.

== See also ==
- List of second-generation Major League Baseball players
