= Iván Herrera =

Panamanian baseball player (born 2000)

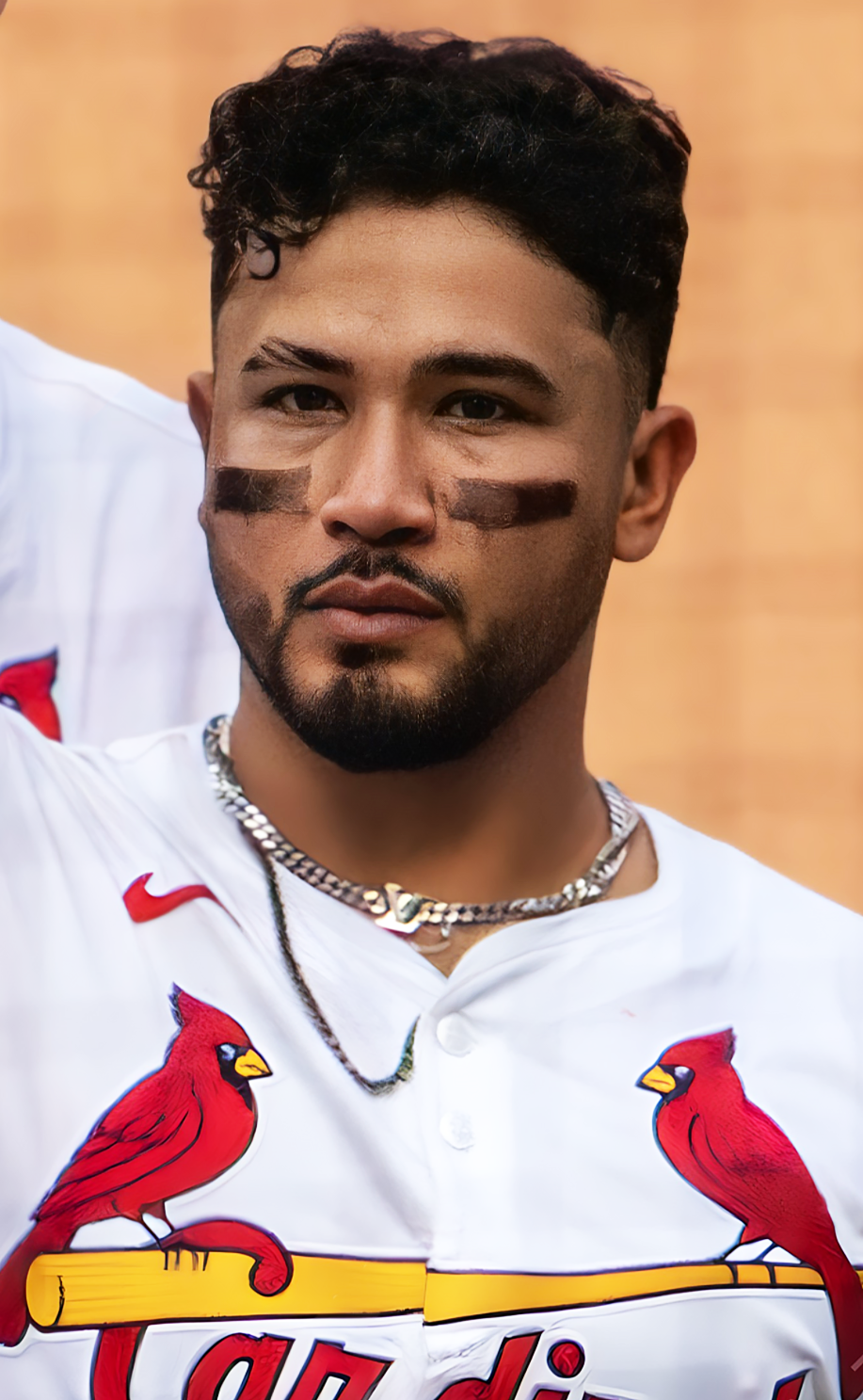
- Herrera with the St. Louis Cardinals in 2025

St. Louis Cardinals – No. 48
- Designated hitter / Catcher
- Born: June 1, 2000 (age 26); Panama City, Panama
- Bats: Right Throws: Right

MLB debut
- May 24, 2022, for the St. Louis Cardinals

MLB statistics (through 2026 season)
- Batting average: .265
- Home runs: 43
- Runs batted in: 167
- Stats at Baseball Reference

Teams
- St. Louis Cardinals (2022–present)

Career highlights and awards
- All-Star (2026)

Iván Aaron Herrera (ee-VAHN; born June 1, 2000) is a Panamanian professional baseball designated hitter and catcher for the St. Louis Cardinals of Major League Baseball (MLB). He made his MLB debut in 2022. Herrera was named to his first All-Star game in 2026.

== Career ==
Herrera signed with the St. Louis Cardinals as an international free agent on July 7, 2016. He received a $200,000 signing bonus.

Herrera made his professional debut in 2017 with the Rookie League Dominican Summer League Cardinals, batting .335 with one home run and 27 RBI over 49 games. In 2018, he spent a majority of the year with the rookie-level Gulf Coast League Cardinals while also playing in two games with the Springfield Cardinals of the Double-A Texas League at the end of the year. Over 30 appearances with both affiliates, Herrera hit .336 with one home run and 25 RBI. Herrera began the 2019 season with the Peoria Chiefs of the Single-A Midwest League before being promoted to the Palm Beach Cardinals of the High-A Florida State League in July; over 87 games between the two clubs, he slashed .284/.374/.405 with nine home runs and 47 RBI. After the season, he was selected to play in the Arizona Fall League with the Glendale Desert Dogs, with whom he was named an All-Star.

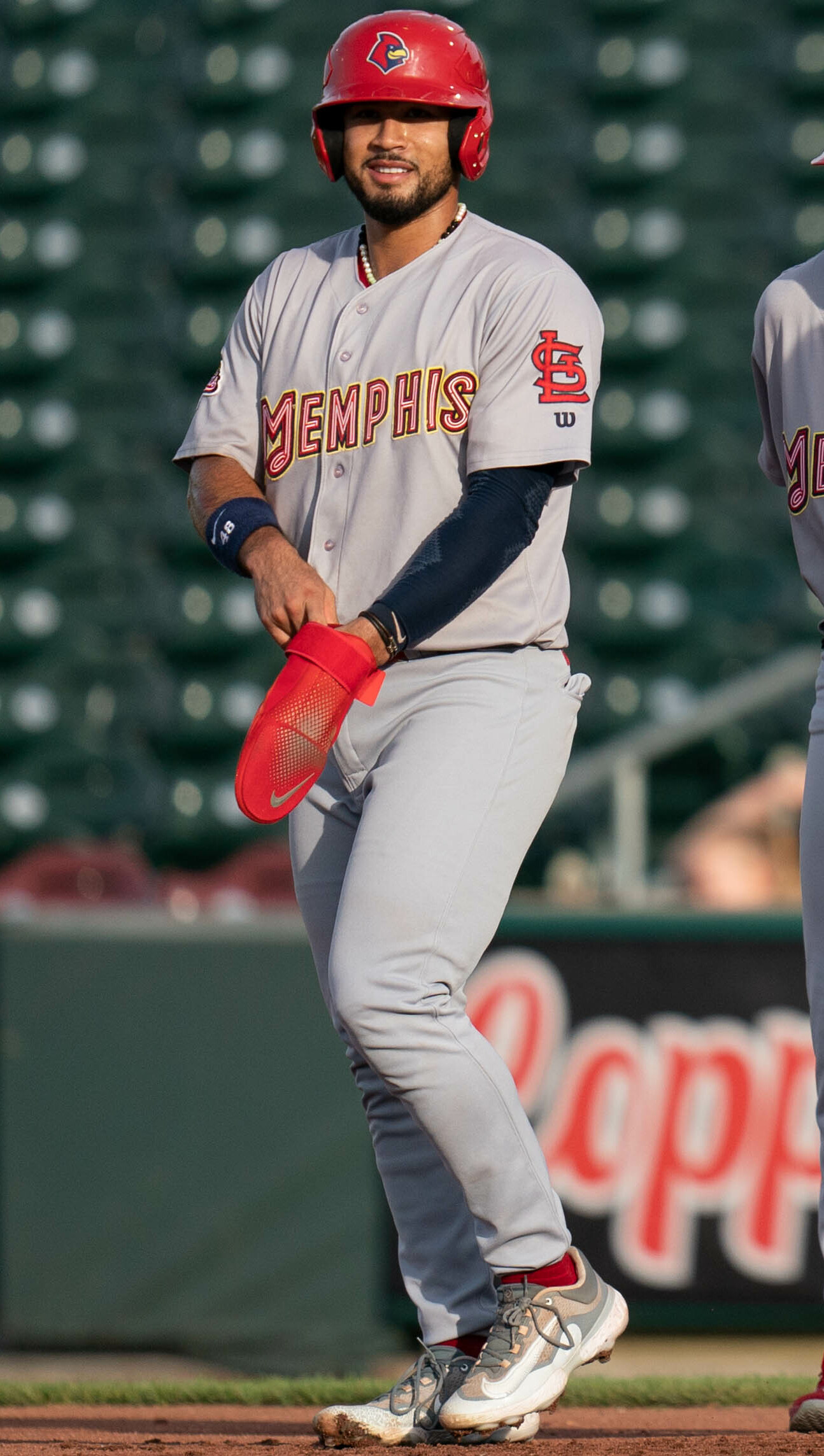
Herrera with the Memphis Redbirds in 2023.

Herrera was a non-roster invite to 2020 spring training. He did not play in a game in 2020 due to the cancellation of the minor league season because of the COVID-19 pandemic. On November 20, 2020, the Cardinals added Herrera to their 40-man roster to protect him from the Rule 5 draft. Herrera spent the majority of the 2021 season with Springfield, slashing .231/.346/.408 with 17 home runs and 63 RBI over 98 games. He played in one game for the Triple-A Memphis Redbirds to end the season.

Herrera began the 2022 season with Memphis. On May 23, 2022, the Cardinals promoted Herrera to the major leagues for the first time. He made his MLB debut the next day. He collected his first career hit on June 26, knocking a single off of Chicago Cubs starter Alec Mills. Herrera appeared in 11 games for St. Louis during his rookie campaign, going 2-for-18 (.111) with six RBI. He spent the majority of the season with Memphis, hitting .268/.374/.396 with six home runs, 34 RBI, and five stolen bases.

Herrera was optioned to Memphis to begin the 2023 season. He made 18 appearances for St. Louis on the year, hitting .297/.409/.351 either four RBI and five walks. Herrera made 72 appearances for the Cardinals during the 2024 campaign, slashing .301/.372/.428 with career-highs in home runs (5), RBI (27), and stolen bases (5). He was named to the All-Tournament team for the 2024 Caribbean Series, while playing winter league baseball for the Federales de Chiriquí of the Panamanian Professional Baseball League.

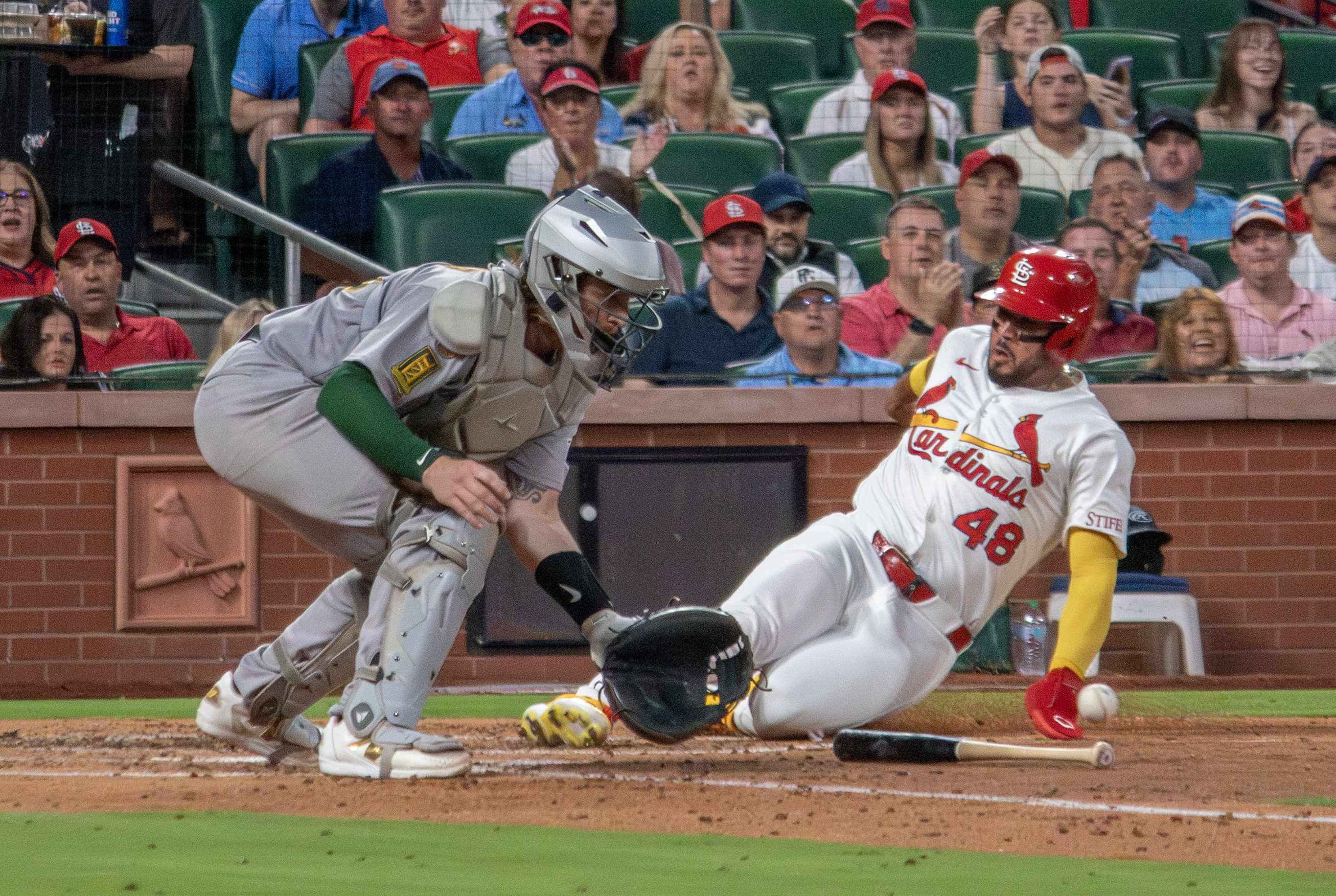
Iván Herrera slides home safe in 2025.

On April 2, 2025, Herrera hit three home runs against the Los Angeles Angels and scored six RBI in the game. Herrera not only recorded his first multi-homer game of his career but also became the first catcher in Cardinals history to hit three homers in a game. In 107 appearances for St. Louis during the regular season, he batted .284/.373/.464 with career-highs in home runs (19), RBI (66), and stolen bases (8). On October 15, Herrera underwent surgery to remove bone spurring.

Herrera committed to play for Panama in the 2026 World Baseball Classic. However, he withdrew after being unable to receive insurance for his participation, due to his offseason elbow surgery.

Herrera was selected for the 2026 All-Star Game as a designated hitter after elected starter Shohei Ohtani opted out due to injury. He played in 161 games for the Cardinals in 2026 and ended the season with a .241 batting average, 19 home runs, and 69 RBI.

== See also ==
- List of Major League Baseball players from Panama
