= Criollos de Caguas (baseball) =

Professional baseball team in Caguas, Puerto Rico

- Logo

Information
- League: Roberto Clemente Professional Baseball League
- Location: Caguas, Puerto Rico
- Ballpark: Parque Yldefonso Solá Morales
- Founded: 1938; 88 years ago
- Caribbean Series championships: 5 (1954, 1974, 1987, 2017, 2018)
- League championships: 21 (1941, 1948, 1950, 1954, 1956, 1958, 1960, 1968, 1974, 1977, 1979, 1981, 1987, 2001, 2011, 2013, 2017, 2018, 2021, 2022, 2024)
- Website: www.criollosdecaguaspr.com (in Spanish)

Current uniforms
Home	Away

Criollos de Caguas (English: Caguas Creoles) are a baseball team in the Puerto Rican Professional Baseball League. Based in the city of Caguas, they have won 21 national titles and five Caribbean World Series, including the 2017-2018 back-to-back championships.

From the mid-1940s until roughly 1970, the team was known as Caguas-Guayama and was jointly based in Caguas and in a nearby city, Guayama.

== History ==
=== Early seasons ===
On December 19, 1951, Earl Harrist recorded the third no-hitter in the LBPPR for Caguas, defeating Mayagüez 9-0. On November 30, 1957, Juan Lizarro pitched the sixth no-hitter in a 7-0 win over Mayagüez.

=== Puerto Rico Baseball League ===
On November 18, 2009, the Gigantes defeated the Criollos. After beginning the season with three consecutive losses, the Leones defeated the Criollos to win their first game. On November 22, 2009, the Leones defeated the Criollos by nine runs. On November 29, 2009, the Criollos defeated the Indios in a game that was shortened due to rain. In the first week of December, the team's reinforcement players, Iván Rodríguez, Yonder Alonso, Luis Villareal and Horacio Ramírez began joining the roster. On December 1, 2009, the Criollos traded Héctor Pellot to the Lobos in exchange of Adrián Ortiz, who the team's general manager, Frankie Thon, intended to employ as pinch runner. The team also released Quintin Berry and placed Helder Velázquez and Luis Cruz in the inactive list, opening places for the reinforcement players. On December 1, 2009, the Criollos defeated the Gigantes to win their first home game of the season. Earlier that day, Alex Cora began practicing with the team, seeking a spot in the roster.

== 2024 Caribbean Series roster ==
Puerto Rico 2024 Caribbean Series Roster
Players		Coaches
Pitchers: (United States) Derrick Adams; (Venezuela) Endrys Briceño; (Puerto Rico) Alex Claudio; (The Bahamas) Chavez Fernander; (United States) Bryan García; (Dominican Republic) Ricardo Gómez; (United States) Lincoln Henzman; (Puerto Rico) Ángel Reyes; (Puerto Rico) Eduardo Rivera; (United States) Alex Sanabia; (United States) Daryl Thompson; (Puerto Rico) Christian Torres; (Puerto Rico) Ricardo Vélez; (United States) Luke Westphal; (United States) Danny Wirchansky; updated on 28 January 2024	Catchers: (Puerto Rico) Jonathan Morales; (Puerto Rico) Bryan Torres; Infielders: (Venezuela) Gabriel Arias; (Puerto Rico) Jancarlos Cintrón; (Puerto Rico) Jack López; (Puerto Rico) Vimael Machin; (Puerto Rico) Emmanuel Rivera; Outfielders: (United States) J. C. Escarra; (Puerto Rico) Johneshwy Fargas; (Puerto Rico) Danny Ortiz; (Puerto Rico) Heliot Ramos; (United States) Dwight Smith Jr.; (Puerto Rico) Nelson Velázquez	Manager: (Puerto Rico) Yadier Molina; Coaches
