= 2026–27 LVBP season =

- League: Venezuelan Professional Baseball League
- Sport: Baseball
- Duration: October 2026 – January 2027
- Games: 56 games (regular season)
- Teams: 8

Regular season

Final Series

Seasons
- ← 2025–26 2027–28 →

The 2026–27 LVBP season will be the 81st edition of the Venezuelan Professional Baseball League (LVBP), the top-level professional baseball league in Venezuela.

The regular season started on October 12, and will run to December 27, 2026. Playoffs are scheduled to begin on January 2, with the final series expected to begin on January 21, 2026.

The winner of the 2026–27 season is set to represent Venezuela at the 2027 Caribbean Series in Hermosillo, Mexico; the LVBP is returning to the tournament after boycotting the 2026 Caribbean Series (which it was stripped from hosting). The runner-up is set to play in the 2027 Serie de las Americas, set to be played in Venezuela.

== Regular season ==
The season opened with a game between the champion Navegantes del Magallanes and the Tiburones de La Guaira on October 12, with the rest of the league opening on October 13.

=== Standings ===
As of 15 November 2026

Pos	Team	G	W	L	Pct.	GB	Home	Road	RS	RA	RD
1	Caribes de Anzoátegui	25	16	9	.640	—	9—6	7—3	174	151	+23
2	Tigres de Aragua	28	17	11	.607	0.5	5—5	12—6	169	144	+25
3	Leones del Caracas	27	16	11	.593	1	9—6	7—5	183	142	+41
4	Cardenales de Lara	25	13	12	.520	3	7—4	6—8	153	154	-1
5	Navegantes del Magallanes	27	13	14	.481	4	6—8	7—6	165	171	-6
6	Tiburones de La Guaira	27	12	15	.444	5	5—6	7—9	156	183	-27
7	Bravos de Margarita	28	12	16	.429	5.5	7—11	5—5	150	177	-27
8	Águilas del Zulia	29	9	20	.310	9	5—9	4—11	149	177	-28

Classified to Round Robin
Classified to Wild Card Series

== Managerial changes ==
=== Off season ===
Team	Former manager	Reason for leaving	Interim manager	New manager	Ref.
Leones del Caracas	(Venezuela) José Alguacil	Reassigned	—N/a	(Venezuela) Lipso Nava	
Tiburones de La Guaira	(Venezuela) Gregorio Petit	Fired	(Venezuela) Marco Davalillo	(Dominican Republic) Fernando Tatís	
Tigres de Aragua	(Venezuela) Ozzie Guillén	Reassigned	—N/a	(Venezuela) Miguel Pérez	
Águilas del Zulia	(Venezuela) Lipso Nava	Reassigned	—N/a	(Venezuela) Guillermo Quiróz	

== League leaders ==
As of 15 November 2025

Hitting leaders
Stat	Player	Team	Total
AVG	(Venezuela) Gabriel González	Anzoátegui	.380
HR	(Venezuela) Carlos Pérez	Margarita	10
RBI	(Venezuela) Gabriel González	Anzoátegui	26
R	(Venezuela) Jorge Barrosa	La Guaira	26
H	(Venezuela) Simón Muzziotti	La Guaira	41
BB	(Venezuela) Daniel Montano	La Guaira	23
SB	(Venezuela) Yonny Hernández	Lara	9
OBP	(Venezuela) Víctor Bericoto	Caracas	.495
SLG	(Venezuela) Ángel Reyes	Magallanes	.701
OPS	(Venezuela) Gabriel González	Anzoátegui	1.136

Pitching leaders
Stat	Player	Team	Total
W	(Venezuela) Jorge García	Margarita	3
L	(Venezuela) Junior Guerra	Margarita	5
ERA	(Venezuela) Jean Pinto	Aragua	1.57
K	(Venezuela) Giuseppe Velasquez	Zulia	30
IP	(Venezuela) Jorge García	Margarita	30.2
SV	(Venezuela) Felipe Vázquez	Zulia	7
