= Minnesota Twins minor league players =

Below are select minor league players and the rosters of the minor league affiliates of the Minnesota Twins:

== Players ==
=== Andrew Cossetti ===
Andrew Cossetti

Minnesota Twins
- Catcher
- Born: January 31, 2000 (age 26); Eagleville, Pennsylvania, U.S.
- Bats: Right Throws: Right

Andrew Cossetti (born January 31, 2000) is an American professional baseball catcher in the Minnesota Twins organization.

Cossetti grew up in Eagleville, Montgomery County, Pennsylvania, and attended La Salle College High School. He was named the Player of the Year by The Philadelphia Inquirer as a senior after batting .449 with seven home runs, 12 doubles, 34 runs scored, and 36 RBI. Cossetti played college baseball at Saint Joseph's for four seasons. As a senior, he batted .327 and set school records with 19 home runs and 65 RBI.

Cossetti was selected in the 11th round by the Minnesota Twins in the 2022 Major League Baseball draft. After signing with the team he was assigned to the Florida Complex League Twins. Cossetti began the 2023 season with the Fort Myers Mighty Mussels. He was named the Florida State League Player of the Month for April.

- Saint Joseph's Hawks bio
- Career statistics from MLB · Baseball Reference (Minors)

=== C. J. Culpepper ===
C. J. Culpepper

Minnesota Twins
- Pitcher
- Born: November 2, 2001 (age 25); Upland, California, U.S.
- Bats: Right Throws: Right

Christian Joseph Culpepper (born November 2, 2001) is an American professional baseball pitcher in the Minnesota Twins organization.

Culpepper attended Rancho Cucamonga High School in Rancho Cucamonga, California, and played college baseball at California Baptist University. He was drafted by the Minnesota Twins in the 13th round of the 2022 Major League Baseball draft.

Culpepper signed with the Twins and made his professional debut with the Florida Complex League Twins. He pitched 2023 with the Fort Myers Mighty Mussels before being promoted to the Cedar Rapids Kernels.

- Career statistics from Baseball Reference (Minors)
- California Baptist Lancers bio

=== Khadim Diaw ===
Khadim Diaw

Minnesota Twins
- Catcher / Outfielder
- Born: August 23, 2003 (age 23); Hoboken, New Jersey, U.S.
- Bats: Right Throws: Right

Khadim Diaw (born August 23, 2003) is an American professional baseball catcher and outfielder in the Minnesota Twins organization.

Diaw attended Notre Dame High School in Sherman Oaks, California and walked on to the Loyola Marymount University (LMU) baseball team for whom he played three years of college baseball. In 2023 for LMU, Diaw played in 52 games and batted .314 with eight home runs and 33 RBI. He played in only 20 games in 2024 due to injury, but still hit .432 with three home runs. After the season, he briefly played in the Cape Cod Baseball League for the Orleans Firebirds and hit .326 in 13 games.

Diaw was selected by the Minnesota Twins in the third round with the 96th overall pick of the 2024 Major League Baseball draft. He became the first player of Senegalese descent to be drafted into MLB. Diaw made his professional debut after signing with the Single-A Fort Myers Mighty Mussels and hit .271 with one home run across 24 games. In 2025, he played with Fort Myers and the High-A Cedar Rapids Kernels and batted .297 with four home runs and 24 RBI, but appeared in only 42 games due to a fractured thumb and a hamstring strain. Diaw was assigned back to Cedar Rapids to begin the 2026 season and was promoted to the Double-A Wichita Wind Surge in June. Across 107 games between the two teams, he hit .306 with nine home runs and 47 RBI.

- Career statistics from Baseball Reference (Minors)
- Loyola Marymount Lions bio

=== Ryan Gallagher ===
Ryan Gallagher

Minnesota Twins
- Pitcher
- Born: January 19, 2003 (age 23); Sacramento, California, U.S.
- Bats: Left Throws: Right

Ryan Thomas Gallagher (born January 19, 2003) is an American professional baseball pitcher in the Minnesota Twins organization.

Gallagher attended Granite Bay High School in Granite Bay, California and played college baseball at the University of California, Santa Barbara. He did not pitch in 2023 after undergoing Tommy John Surgery and returned in 2024. He was selected by the Chicago Cubs in the sixth round of the 2024 Major League Baseball draft.

Gallagher made his professional debut in 2025 with the South Bend Cubs and was promoted to the Tennessee Smokies during the season.

On July 31, 2025 the Cubs traded Gallagher and Sam Armstrong to the Minnesota Twins for Willi Castro.

- Career statistics from Baseball Reference (Minors)

=== Cory Lewis ===
Cory Lewis

Minnesota Twins
- Pitcher
- Born: October 9, 2000 (age 26); Fountain Valley, California, U.S.
- Bats: Right Throws: Right

Cory Andrew Lewis (born October 9, 2000) is an American professional baseball pitcher in the Minnesota Twins organization.

Lewis attended Marina High School in Huntington Beach, California. As a senior at Marina, he went 3–0 with a 0.88 ERA over 39 innings alongside batting .258 with two home runs. He went undrafted in the 2019 Major League Baseball draft and enrolled at the University of California, Santa Barbara where he played college baseball.

Lewis redshirted the 2020 season. For the 2021 season, he appeared in 15 games (making ten starts) and went 7–4 with a 3.38 ERA and 86 strikeouts over eighty innings. As a redshirt sophomore in 2022, he started 16 games and went 9–1 with a 3.57 ERA and 107 strikeouts. He was selected by the Minnesota Twins in the ninth round of the 2022 Major League Baseball draft.

Lewis signed with the Twins and made his professional debut in 2023 with the Fort Myers Miracle. In early June, he was promoted to the Cedar Rapids Kernels. Over 22 starts between the two teams, Lewis went 9–4 with a 2.49 ERA and 118 strikeouts over 101 1/3 innings. He missed time in 2024 due to a shoulder injury. Lewis appeared in 19 games between the Florida Complex League Twins, Fort Myers, the Wichita Wind Surge, and the St. Paul Saints, going 3–6 with a 2.51 ERA and 92 strikeouts over 79 innings. He was assigned to St. Paul for the 2025 season. Over 24 appearances (11 starts), Lewis went 4–6 with a 7.27 ERA and 87 strikeouts over 73 innings. In 2026, he missed time with a shoulder injury, and completed rehab assignments with the Florida Complex League Twins and Fort Myers. After rehab, Lewis was assigned to Wichita and pitched in 25 games, posting a 2–9 record, a 4.13 ERA and 106 strikeouts over 93 2/3 innings.

- Career statistics from Baseball Reference (Minors)

=== Hendry Méndez ===
Hendry Méndez

Minnesota Twins – No. 64
- Outfielder
- Born: November 7, 2003 (age 23); Santo Domingo, Dominican Republic
- Bats: Right Throws: Right

Hendry Méndez (born November 7, 2003) is a Dominican professional baseball outfielder for the Minnesota Twins of Major League Baseball (MLB).

Méndez signed with the Milwaukee Brewers as an international free agent in January 2021. On November 14, 2023, the Brewers traded Méndez and Robert Moore to the Philadelphia Phillies in exchange for Oliver Dunn.

On July 31, 2025, the Phillies traded Méndez and Geremy Villoria to the Minnesota Twins in exchange for Harrison Bader. He made 33 appearances down the stretch for the Double-A Wichita Wind Surge, batting .324/.461/.450 with three home runs, 16 RBI, and four stolen bases. After the 2025 season, Méndez played in the Arizona Fall League. On November 18, the Twins added Méndez to their 40-man roster to protect him from the Rule 5 draft.

Méndez was optioned to Double-A Wichita to begin the 2026 season.

- Career statistics from Baseball Reference (Minors)

=== Yasser Mercedes ===
Yasser Mercedes

Minnesota Twins
- Outfielder
- Born: November 16, 2004 (age 22); Rio Piedras, Puerto Rico
- Bats: Right Throws: Right

Yasser Antonio Mercedes (born November 16, 2004) is a Puerto Rican professional baseball outfielder in the Minnesota Twins organization.

Mercedes signed with the Minnesota Twins as an international free agent in January 2022. He made his professional debut that year with the Dominican Summer League Twins.

Mercedes played in the Arizona Fall League after the 2026 season.

- Career statistics from Baseball Reference (Minors)

=== Luis Quiñones ===
Luis Quiñones

Minnesota Twins
- Pitcher
- Born: July 2, 1997 (age 29); Arecibo, Puerto Rico
- Bats: Right Throws: Right

Luis Steven Quiñones (born July 2, 1997) is a Puerto Rican professional baseball pitcher for the Minnesota Twins of Major League Baseball (MLB). He was named to the Puerto Rico national baseball team for the 2026 World Baseball Classic.

Quiñones was drafted by the Toronto Blue Jays in the 34th-round of the 2019 MLB draft out of San Jacinto Junior College. Later that year, Quiñones was suspended 80 games for performance-enhancing drug use. Quiñones reached Triple-A in 2024, but was released by the Blue Jays following the 2025 season.

On December 21, 2025, Quiñones signed a minor league contract with the Minnesota Twins.

- Career statistics from Baseball Reference (Minors)

=== Jake Rucker ===
Jake Rucker

Minnesota Twins
- Third baseman
- Born: September 14, 1999 (age 27); Nashville, Tennessee, U.S.
- Bats: Right Throws: Right

Jacob Andrew Rucker (born September 14, 1999) is an American professional baseball third baseman in the Minnesota Twins organization.

Rucker played in the 2012 Little League World Series. Rucker attended Pope John Paul II High School. Rucker played college baseball at Tennessee from 2019 to 2021.

Rucker was drafted in the 7th round of the 2021 draft by the Minnesota Twins.

- Career statistics from Baseball Reference (Minors)

=== Tanner Schobel ===
Tanner Schobel

Minnesota Twins
- Shortstop
- Born: June 4, 2001 (age 25); Panama City, Florida, U.S.
- Bats: Right Throws: Right

Tanner George Schobel (born June 4, 2001) is an American baseball shortstop who plays in the Minnesota Twins organization.

Schobel grew up in Williamsburg, Virginia, and attended Walsingham Academy. He began playing for the school's varsity baseball team in the eighth grade. Schobel played summer collegiate baseball after graduating high school for the Peninsula Pilots of the Coastal Plain League.

Schobel started all 52 of Virginia Tech's games during his freshman season and batted .279 with seven home runs, ten doubles, 33 RBIs, and 36 runs scored. After the 2021 season he played for the Bourne Braves of the Cape Cod Baseball League. As a sophomore, Schobel hit .362 with 19 home runs and 74 RBIs.

Schobel was selected in the Competitive Balance section of the second round of the 2022 Major League Baseball draft. He signed with the Twins for a bonus just over $1 million on July 26, 2022.

- Career statistics from Baseball Reference (Minors)
- Virginia Tech Hokies bio

=== Eduardo Tait ===
Eduardo Tait

Minnesota Twins
- Catcher
- Born: August 27, 2006 (age 20); Panama City, Panama
- Bats: Left Throws: Right

Eduardo Ricardo Tait Velasco (born August 27, 2006) is a Panamanian professional baseball catcher in the Minnesota Twins organization.

Tait signed with the Philadelphia Phillies as an international free agent on January 15, 2023. He spent the 2023 season with the Dominican Summer League Phillies, earning Mid-Season All-Star honors and system hitter of the month honors for July. Tait started the 2024 season with the Rookie-level Florida Complex League Phillies. He would be named the FCL's player of the month for the month of June.

Tait has also represented Panama at the international level. He played for the team at the 2022 U-18 Baseball World Cup, during which he went 8-20 with four doubles and six RBI in eight games for the Panama national baseball team.

On July 30, 2025, the Phillies traded Tait and Mick Abel to the Minnesota Twins in exchange for pitcher Jhoan Durán.

- Career statistics from Baseball Reference (Minors)

=== Brandon Winokur ===
Brandon Winokur

Minnesota Twins
- Shortstop
- Born: December 16, 2004 (age 21); Newport Beach, California, U.S.
- Bats: Right Throws: Right

Brandon Murphy Winokur (born December 16, 2004) is an American professional baseball shortstop in the Minnesota Twins organization.

Winokur attended Edison High School in Huntington Beach, California. He was selected by the Minnesota Twins in the third round of the 2023 Major League Baseball draft. Winokur signed with the Twins for $1.5 million, forgoing his commitment to play college baseball at UCLA.

Winkour made his professional debut with the Florida Complex League Twins. He played 2024 with the Fort Myers Mighty Mussels.

- Career statistics from Baseball Reference (Minors)

== Minor League affiliate rosters ==
=== Triple-A ===
St. Paul Saints roster
Players		Coaches/Other
Pitchers: 47 Trent Baker; 21 Ricky Castro; 56 C. J. Culpepper; -- Jose Espada; 33 Ryan Gallagher; 24 Ruddy Gomez; 58 Alejandro Hidalgo; 64 Paulshawn Pasqualotto	Catchers: 16 Noah Cardenas; 63 Ian Daugherty; Infielders: 25 Cody Morissette; 20 Jake Rucker; 1 Tanner Schobel; Outfielders	Manager: 12 Brian Dinkelman; Coaches: 55 C.J. Baker (hitting); 27 Carlos Hernandez (pitching); 64 Ryan Ricci (pitching); 35 Shawn Schlechter (hitting); 7-day injured list; * On Minnesota Twins 40-man roster; ~ Development list; # Rehab assignment; ∞ Reserve list; ‡ Restricted list; § Suspended list; † Temporarily inactive list; Roster updated November 18, 2026; Transactions; → More rosters: MiLB • International League; → Minnesota Twins minor league players

=== Double-A ===
Wichita Turbo Tubs roster
Players		Coaches/Other
Pitchers: 33 Sam Armstrong; 44 Spencer Bengard; 35 Kyle Bischoff; 16 Adrian Bohorquez; 24 Darren Bowen; -- Hunter Hoopes; 45 Preston Johnson; 17 Eli Jones; 38 Ty Langenberg; 43 Cory Lewis; 46 Mitch Mueller; 23 Jaylen Nowlin; 16 Jose Olivares; 39 Riley Quick; 18 Yehizon Sanchez; 41 Chris Vallimont	Catchers: 31 Andrew Cossetti; 13 Khadim Diaw; 19 Luis Hernandez; 26 Poncho Ruiz; Infielders: 11 Danny De Andrade; 9 Kyle DeBarge; 15 Marek Houston; 25 Jay Thomason; Outfielders: 22 Graham Brown; 20 Jaime Ferrer; 21 Caden Kendle; 1 Garrett Spain; 17 Brandon Winokur	Manager: 32 Nico Giarratano; Coaches: 55 Andrew Cresci (hitting); 0 Julian Gonzalez (development); 47 Stephen Ridings (pitching); 27 Jesus Sanchez (pitching); 7-day injured list; * On Minnesota Twins 40-man roster; ~ Development list; # Rehab assignment; ∞ Reserve list; ‡ Restricted list; § Suspended list; † Temporarily inactive list; Roster updated November 2, 2026; Transactions; → More rosters: MiLB • Texas League; → Minnesota Twins minor league players

=== High-A ===
Cedar Rapids Kernels roster
Players		Coaches/Other
Pitchers: 43 Christian Becerra; 50 Michael Carpenter; 44 Jason Doktorczyk; 35 Ross Dunn; 40 Brent Francisco; -- Tanner Hall; 44 Michael Hilker; 35 Garrett Horn; 51 Merit Jones; 46 Xavier Kolhosser; 41 Cesar Lares; 5 Cleiber Maldonado; 26 Mike McKenna; 32 Justin Mitrovich; 45 Reed Moring; 25 Cole Peschl; 50 Sam Rochard; 19 Ivran Romero; 31 Michael Ross; 21 Kolten Smith; -- Charlee Soto; 21 Eston Stull; 13 Finnegan Wall; 48 Brian Zeldin	Catchers: -- Francisco Espinoza; 44 Enrique Jimenez; 23 Vahn Lackey; 30 Irvin Nunez; 40 Ricardo Pena; 27 Eduardo Tait; Infielders: 2 Ramiro Dominguez; 8 Yilber Herrera; 33 Andy Lugo; 46 JP Smith II; Outfielders: 12 Jayson Bass; 24 Byron Chourio; 11 Luis Fragoza; 15 Jacob McCombs; 17 Yasser Mercedes; 20 Jhomnardo Reyes	Manager: 16 Brian Meyer; Coaches: 22 Erick Julio (pitching); 49 Danny Marcuzzo (hitting); 20 Yeison Perez (hitting); 18 Hunter Townsend (pitching); 7-day injured list; * On Minnesota Twins 40-man roster; ~ Development list; # Rehab assignment; ∞ Reserve list; ‡ Restricted list; § Suspended list; † Temporarily inactive list; Roster updated November 20, 2026; Transactions; → More rosters: MiLB • Midwest League; → Minnesota Twins minor league players

=== Single-A ===
Fort Myers Mighty Mussels roster
Players		Coaches/Other
Pitchers: 41 Matt Barr; 46 Max Bayles; 32 Matthew Becker; 32 Tyler Bryan; 25 Thomas Burns; 50 Hendry Chivilli; 12 Matthew Dalquist; -- Jack Dougherty; -- James Ellwanger; 44 Adam Falinski; 37 Callan Fang; 1 Joel Garcia; 51 Eric Hammond; 22 Cristian Hernandez; -- Jake Hunter; -- Jace Kaminska; 46 Jui-Chieh Lin; 13 Rainer Marin; 38 Jake Murray; 45 Jason Reitz; 35 Melvin Rodriguez; 16 Brad Rudis; 27 Aidan Russell; 41 Jackson Sleeper; 22 Jonathan Stevens; 15 Brian Strange; 17 Ramiro Villanueva	Catchers: 38 Jimmy Keegan; 8 Hideki Prather; 33 Carson Tinney; Infielders: 11 Bryan Acuña; 24 Isaiah Lane; -- Shai Robinson; 4 Charlie Scholvin; 21 Colby Turner; 23 Quentin Young; Outfielders: -- Eduardo Beltre; 1 Yovanny Duran; 20 Bryce Fowler; 2 Merphy Hernandez; 5 Ricardo Paez; 9 Aidan Teel	Manager: 39 Jordan Smith; Coaches: 18 Dylan Hawley (pitching); 19 Carlos Lara (hitting); 26 Richard Salazar (pitching); 7-day injured list; * On Minnesota Twins 40-man roster; ~ Development list; # Rehab assignment; ∞ Reserve list; ‡ Restricted list; § Suspended list; † Temporarily inactive list; Roster updated November 2, 2026; Transactions; → More rosters: MiLB • Florida State League; → Minnesota Twins minor league players

=== Rookie ===
Florida Complex League Twins roster
Players		Coaches/Other
Pitchers: -- Hagan Banks; -- Michael Barnett; -- Alec Bouchard; 47 Santiago Castellanos; 56 Frederick Hiciano; 60 Yordi Jose; -- Kole Klecker; -- Ethan Lay; -- Tommy LaPour; -- Connor Mattison; -- Colter McAnelly; 61 Omar Montano; -- Steele Murdock; 52 Rey Pacheco; -- Ryne Palmer; -- JT Raab; 92 Anderson Ramos; -- Brett Renfrow; 21 Yoel Roque; 50 Geremy Villoria; -- Ethan Wachsmann	Catchers: 24 Miguel Caraballo; 25 Haritzon Castillo; 48 Pablo Castillo; -- Victor Leal; 33 Daniel Pena; Infielders: 67 Darwin Almanzar; 38 Jose Barrios; 23 Daiber De Los Santos; 93 Santiago Leon; -- PJ Moutzouridis; Outfielders: 11 Joyner Perez; 1 Teilon Serrano; 22 Carlos Taveras	Manager: 86 Tristan Toorie; Coaches: 8 Steve Cardona (hitting); 96 Emilio Guerrero (hitting); 97 Matthew Hartshorn (pitching); 94 Carter Kessinger (pitching); 98 Ryan Meisinger (pitching); 35 Jairo Rodriguez (development); 99 Dan Urbina (pitching); 7-day injured list; * On Minnesota Twins 40-man roster; ~ Development list; # Rehab assignment; ∞ Reserve list; ‡ Restricted list; § Suspended list; † Temporarily inactive list; Roster updated November 2, 2026; Transactions; → More rosters: MiLB • Florida Complex League; → Minnesota Twins minor league players

=== Foreign Rookie ===
Dominican Summer League Twins roster
Players		Coaches/Other
Pitchers: 58 Cristian Alvino; 67 Yosangel Braffit; 39 Agustin Campusano; 63 Jhordy Ciriaco; 18 Juan Collado; 75 Arthur De La Cruz; 47 Sebastian Echavarria; 50 Yolcar Garcia; 74 Jesus Gomez; 19 Fernando Hernandez; 65 Jeremy Jiminez; 52 Camilo Made; 73 Juan Marquez; 53 Abraham Martinez; 41 Adrian Martinez; -- Luis Martinez; 45 Enmanuel Mena; 5 Manuel Meza; 30 Jesus Moreno; 48 Aldwin Morillo; 21 Juan Quinones; 71 Alam Soriano; 66 Herkyn Taveras	Catchers: 35 Jeferson Abreu; 56 Luis Duarte; Infielders: 1 Daiyer Barboza; 4 Nolwer Barboza; 37 Anibal Beltre; 8 Juan Holmann; 11 Jendy Martinez; 26 Enmanuel Merlo; 55 Fabian Ulloa; Outfielders: 64 Jhon Gonzalez; 12 Abel Sosa	Manager: 38 Rafael Martinez; Coaches: -- Gabriel Garcia (pitching); -- Ozney Guillen (hitting); -- Ruben Santana (infield); -- Zach Simmons (hitting); -- Alex Wright (pitching); 7-day injured list; * On Minnesota Twins 40-man roster; ~ Development list; # Rehab assignment; ∞ Reserve list; ‡ Restricted list; § Suspended list; † Temporarily inactive list; Roster updated November 9, 2026; Transactions; → More rosters: MiLB • Dominican Summer League; → Minnesota Twins minor league players
