= St. Paul Saints =

- Founded in 1993; St. Paul, Minnesota
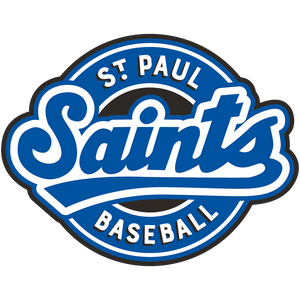
Team logo
Cap insignia

Minor league affiliations
- Class: Triple-A (2021–present)
- Previous classes: Independent (1993–2020)
- League: International League (2021–present)
- Division: West Division
- Previous leagues: American Association of Professional Baseball (2006–2020); Northern League (1993–2005)

Major league affiliations
- Team: Minnesota Twins (2021–present)

Minor league titles
- League titles (5): 1993; 1995; 1996; 2004; 2019
- Division titles (9): 1996; 1998; 2004; 2006; 2007; 2015; 2016; 2018; 2019
- First-half titles (6): 1995; 1996; 1997; 2000; 2003; 2005
- Second-half titles (6): 1993; 1995; 1996; 1998; 2004; 2007

Team data
- Name: St. Paul Saints (1993–present)
- Colors: Reflex blue, red, white, black, gold
- Ballpark: CHS Field (2015–present)
- Previous parks: Midway Stadium (1993–2014)
- Owner/ Operator: Diamond Baseball Holdings
- General manager: Derek Sharrer
- Manager: Brian Dinkelman
- Website: milb.com/st-paul

The St. Paul Saints are a Minor League Baseball team of the International League and the Triple-A affiliate of the Minnesota Twins. They are located in Saint Paul, Minnesota, and have played their home games at CHS Field since 2015. They previously played at Midway Stadium from 1993 to 2014.

From their founding in 1993 through 2020, the Saints were an independent baseball team with no affiliation with Major League Baseball (MLB). They played in the Northern League from 1993 to 2005 and the American Association of Independent Professional Baseball from 2006 to 2020. The Saints became an MLB-affiliated team in conjunction with the reorganization of the minor leagues beginning with the 2021 season. They were placed in the Triple-A East, but this was renamed the International League in 2022.

Before the arrival of the Minnesota Twins from Washington, D.C., in 1961, there was a long history of minor league baseball teams called the St. Paul Saints, as well as their crosstown rivals the Minneapolis Millers. One incarnation of the Saints participated in the Union Association, a short-lived major league, in 1884. A second incarnation was active in the Western League from 1894 to 1899, and became a forerunner of the modern Chicago White Sox. The third and most long-lived incarnation of the Saints was active in the American Association from 1915 to 1960.

== History ==
=== St. Paul Saints (1894–1899) ===
As described in Lee Allen's book, The American League Story (Putnam, 1962), the team began as the Sioux City Cornhuskers franchise in a minor league called the Western League. This circuit had reorganized itself in November 1893, with Ban Johnson as president. Johnson, a Cincinnati-based reporter, had been recommended by his friend Charles Comiskey, former major league star with the St. Louis Browns in the 1880s, who was then managing the Cincinnati Reds. After the 1894 season, when Comiskey's contract with the Reds was up, he decided to take his chances at ownership. He bought the Sioux City team and transferred it to St. Paul, where the St. Paul Saints enjoyed some success over the next five seasons.

In 1900, the Western League changed its name to the American League. It was still officially a minor league, a part of the National Agreement and an underling of the National League. The National League gave permission to the American League to put a team in Chicago, and on March 21, 1900, Comiskey moved his St. Paul club to the South Side, where they became the Chicago White Sox.

=== St. Paul Saints (1901–1960) ===
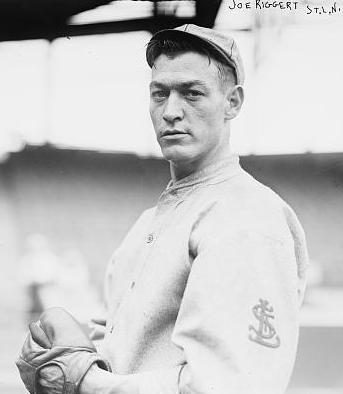
Joe Riggert accumulated 1,639 hits over 12 seasons with the American Association Saints from 1912 to 1924.

Another team called the Saints played Minor League Baseball in the American Association from 1901 to 1960. The Saints finished first in the American Association nine times, and won the Little World Series in 1924. During this period, the Saints were a farm club of the Chicago White Sox (1936–1942), the Brooklyn Dodgers (1944–1957), and the Los Angeles Dodgers (1958–1960).

During the 1948 season, Brooklyn Dodger Roy Campanella was reassigned to the Saints. On May 18, he become the first person to break the color barrier in the American Association when he took the field in a game.

The Saints played streetcar home and away double headers with their local rivals, the Minneapolis Millers. When the Minnesota Twins came to town in 1961, the Saints became the Omaha Dodgers while the Millers ceased operations and their role as affiliate to the Boston Red Sox was filled by the Seattle Rainiers. Lexington Park served as the Saints' home stadium for most of those years.

During the six decades of the original American Association minor league, the Minneapolis Millers and St. Paul Saints engaged in vigorous rivalry known as the Streetcar Series. This series has been documented in a book by Rex Hamann entitled The Millers and the Saints, Baseball Championships of the Twin Cities Rivals (2014).

=== Current franchise ===
==== Independent baseball (1993–2020) ====
In a tradition started in the team's first year, the Saints' pig brings out game balls and receives a snack between innings.

The current inception of the St. Paul Saints was formed in 1993 in the Northern League, one of several independent leagues not affiliated with Major League Baseball. The Saints are known for promotions that are sometimes over-the-top even by the standards of Minor League Baseball. In this regard, Mike Veeck, owner of the team from its inception until 2023, was seen as following in the footsteps of his father Bill Veeck, who was famous for conceiving outlandish promotions as an owner of the major league St. Louis Browns, Cleveland Indians, and Chicago White Sox. Marvin Goldklang and actor Bill Murray were also founders and owners of the team with Veeck until 2023.

Despite the considerable naysaying at their inception, the Saints became one of the most successful teams in the Northern League and all of independent baseball. From 2002 to 2004, the Saints saw severely reduced attendance, owing partially to renewed interest in the Minnesota Twins of Major League Baseball, who won the 2002, 2003, and 2004 American League Central Division championships. In spite of an initially cool, if not outright hostile reception, the Saints and their major league neighbor (less than 10 miles (16 km) away) have worked together for several years to promote the sport of baseball.

The Saints have figured prominently in the creation of modern independent baseball. The team has been featured in books (Rebel Baseball by Steve Perlstein, 1993; Slouching Toward Fargo by Neal Karlen, 1998) and a cable network series (Baseball, Minnesota, FX Network, 1996–97). Mike Veeck wrote a book that covered the mantra "Fun is Good" (2005) and describes the business approach he has used for many years. The team's history is also featured in the documentary film For The Fun Of The Game, which was released in 2018.

On May 31, 1997, the Saints became the first professional men's baseball team since integration to have a female on their roster. Ila Borders, a pitcher, played with the team out of the bullpen for a month before being traded.

On September 29, 2005, the Saints left the Northern League, along with the Lincoln Saltdogs, Sioux City Explorers, and the Sioux Falls Pheasants to start the American Association for the 2006 season.

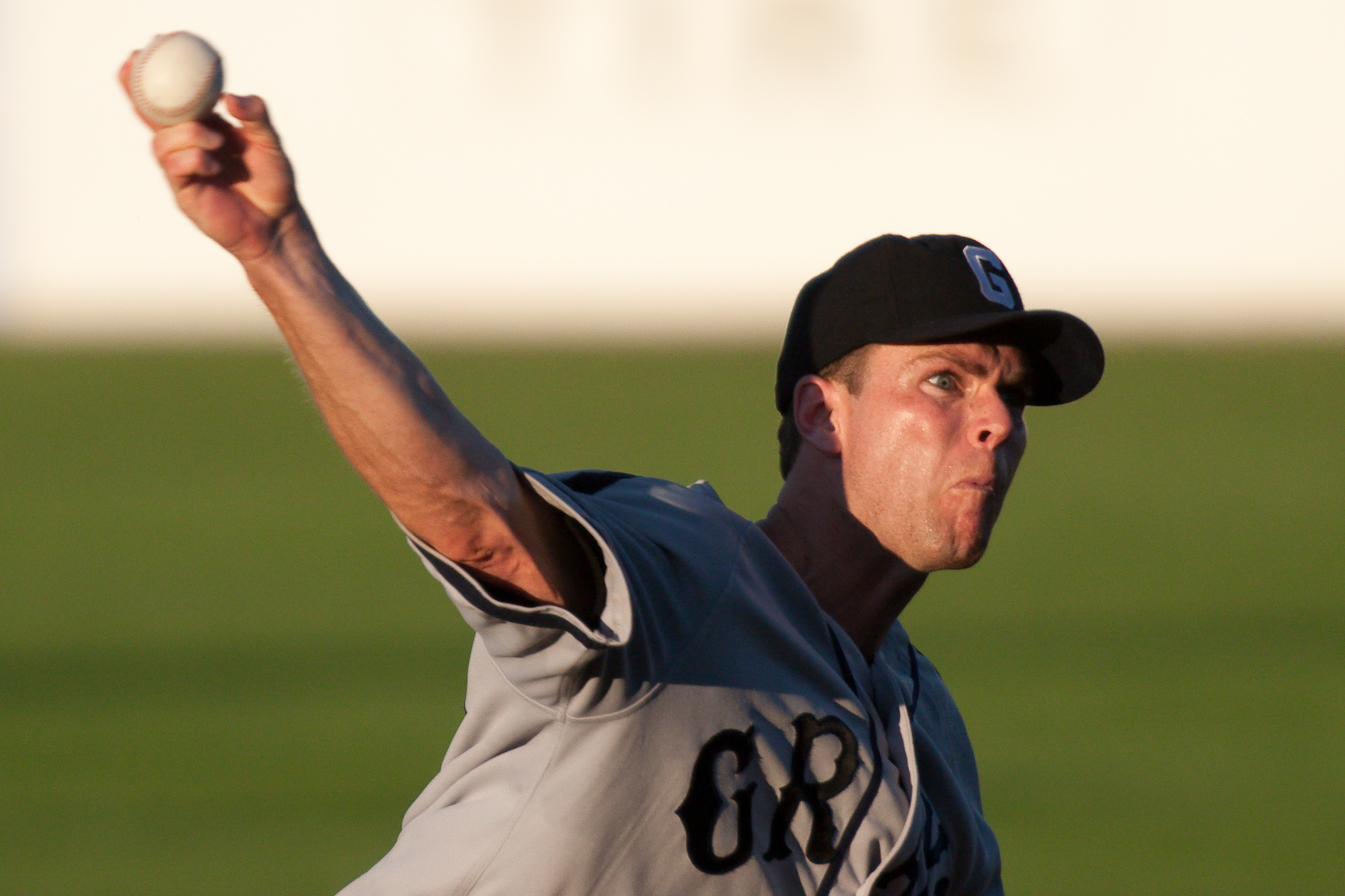
Saints pitcher Mitch Wylie during a 2009 game wearing the uniform of the Homestead Grays in honor of Minnesota's contribution to African-Americans in baseball.

In June 2009, the Saints began a push to build a new stadium in Downtown Saint Paul. The proposed 7,500-seat stadium would be located in the Lowertown neighborhood near a planned maintenance facility for the METRO Green Line light rail. The city of Saint Paul requested $25 million in its 2010 bonding wish list to the Minnesota Legislature.

During their final 5 years in the American Association and their first 5 years in CHS Field, the Saints consistently led the league in attendance, averaging more than 8,000 fans in the regular season during the period of 2015–19.

In 2020, the Saints competed as one of six teams in a condensed 60-game season as a result of the COVID-19 pandemic. They played much of their season away from their home stadium, CHS Field, and were instead based at Sioux Falls Stadium, where they shared a home field with the Sioux Falls Canaries. On August 4, 2020, the Saints returned to play at CHS Field.

The beginnings of a closer relationship with the local Major League Baseball franchise, the Minnesota Twins, came in the summer of 2020. Due to the pandemic, the 2020 MLB season was modified in several ways, including the cancellation of the 2020 Minor League Baseball season. Because of this, teams were allowed to use taxi squads located at nearby facilities where non-active minor league players were allowed to train. The Twins made use of the Saints' CHS Field facilities as home for their taxi squad.

Notable players to have played for the Saints during their independent baseball years include Shane Costa, Glenn Davis, J. D. Drew, Leon "Bull" Durham, Gavin Fingleson, Dan Johnson, Brandon Kintzler, Kevin Millar, Minnie Miñoso, Jack Morris, Darryl Motley, Matt Nokes, Rey Ordóñez, Tanner Scheppers, Dave Stevens, Darryl Strawberry and Caleb Thielbar.

==== Affiliated baseball (2021–present) ====
The Saints' 2021 uniforms

Due to the 2021 full-scale reorganization of Minor League Baseball, there was much speculation as to what would happen to independent leagues such as the American Association and specifically the Saints. On November 11, 2020, it was reported that the Minnesota Twins ended their 18-year affiliation with their Triple-A affiliate, the Rochester Red Wings. At this time it was also reported that the Saints were a front-runner to be the Twins' new Triple-A affiliate. The main barrier to a deal was said to be the $20 million fee required for affiliation. The Twins aided in this by becoming minority shareholders in the Saints and placing their Triple-A affiliation in St. Paul beginning with the 2021 season. The Saints were organized into the Triple-A East. At a distance of 12.9 miles (along Interstate 94, including surface streets), CHS Field is the closest Triple-A ballpark to its MLB parent team.

The Saints began competition as a Twins affiliate on May 4, 2021, with an 8–2 loss to the Omaha Storm Chasers at Werner Park in Papillion, Nebraska. St. Paul ended the season in third place in the Midwestern Division with a 61–59 record. No playoffs were held to determine a league champion; instead, the team with the best regular-season record was declared the winner. However, 10 games that had been postponed from the start of the season were reinserted into the schedule as a postseason tournament called the Triple-A Final Stretch in which all 30 Triple-A clubs competed for the highest winning percentage. St. Paul finished the tournament tied for seventh place with a 6–4 record. In 2022, the Triple-A East became known as the International League, the name historically used by the regional circuit prior to the 2021 reorganization.

In March 2023, it was announced that The Goldklang Group was selling the team to Diamond Baseball Holdings for an undisclosed sum. Diamond Baseball Holdings owns a number of minor league teams, including the Iowa Cubs and the Minnesota Twins' Class AA affiliate Wichita Wind Surge.

== Roster ==
St. Paul Saints roster
Players	Coaches/Other
Pitchers: 26 Garrett Acton *; 40 Jack Anderson *; 47 Trent Baker; 65 Matt Bowman; 21 Ricky Castro; 56 C. J. Culpepper; 33 Ryan Gallagher; 24 Ruddy Gomez; 58 Alejandro Hidalgo; -- Cody Laweryson; 24 Ron Marinaccio †; 60 Germán Márquez; 46 Julian Merryweather; 38 Eric Orze *; 64 Paulshawn Pasqualotto; 51 Marco Raya *; 54 Kendry Rojas *; 67 Aaron Rozek; 41 Joe Ryan #; Catchers: 53 David Bañuelos; 16 Noah Cardenas; 63 Ian Daugherty; Infielders: 8 Tristan Gray *; 25 Cody Morissette; 20 Jake Rucker; 19 Aaron Sabato; 1 Tanner Schobel; Outfielders: 32 Gabriel Gonzalez *; 44 Hendry Méndez *; 39 Kala'i Rosario; 13 Matt Wallner *	Manager: 12 Brian Dinkelman; Coaches: 55 C.J. Baker (hitting); 27 Carlos Hernandez (pitching); 64 Ryan Ricci (pitching); 35 Shawn Schlechter (hitting); 60-day injured list: 62 Matt Canterino; 62 Kyler Fedko * (full season); 11 Ricardo Olivar; 7-day injured list; * On Minnesota Twins 40-man roster; ~ Development list; # Rehab assignment; ∞ Reserve list; ‡ Restricted list; § Suspended list; † Temporarily inactive list; Roster updated September 18, 2026; Transactions; → More rosters: MiLB • International League; → Minnesota Twins minor league players

== Notable promotions ==
In an attempt to gain publicity in a metropolitan area that hosts five major pro sports teams and a major college program, the Saints created promotions that have received media attention.

- The Saints celebrated the 40th anniversary of Animal House on August 14, 2018, by staging the world's largest food fight after the completion of the fifth inning against the Sioux Falls Canaries. Approximately 8,000 fans participated.
- On August 22, 2017, the Saints held the world's largest Twister game, with over 56,000 dots painted on the outfield grass.
- On July 21, 2015, in an event sponsored by My Pillow, the world's largest pillow fight was held after the second inning, with 6,261 participants. The event was hosted by Stephen Baldwin. Additionally, in honor of the 40th season of Saturday Night Live, former cast member Joe Piscopo performed the national anthem in his impression of Frank Sinatra, and made other appearances throughout the game.
- A May 11, 2013, exhibition game between the Saints and Gary SouthShore Railcats was played without umpires. The team instead had a judge, in a judicial robe, call balls and strikes from behind the pitcher. Calls at first and third bases were made by a "jury" of 12 Little League players, with the judge able to overrule any calls.
- In August 2012, as part of a regional conference held by the Minnesota Atheists, the Saints held "A Night of Unbelievable Fun", where the team wore alternate jerseys branding themselves as the "Mr. Paul Aint's". The promotion was reprised in subsequent seasons.
- On July 23, 2011, the Saints celebrated National Hot Dog Day and parodied Anthony Weiner and his first sexting scandal. The first 1,501 fans age 18 or older received "Tweeting Wiener Boxer Shorts", depicting a blue bird taking a picture of a hot dog, or "wiener". The bird was deliberately drawn to resemble the logo of Twitter, the social media site that Weiner used to send links to indecent photos.
- The Saints announced a giveaway for their May 23, 2009, game against the Sioux Falls Pheasants of 2,500 bobblehead dolls dressed as the Sesame Street character Count von Count, supposedly celebrating the 40th anniversary of the series. The Saints' version of this doll, however, had the face of Al Franken on one side and Norm Coleman on the other and was named "Count von Re-Count"—referring to the prolonged recount in the 2008 U.S. Senate election between the two men. The Saints made further jabs at the race:
  - The ceremonial first pitch was thrown by Dean Barkley, who ran in that election as a third-party candidate.
  - Fans were asked during the game to spin the heads of their dolls to either Coleman or Franken. Attorneys were present to count the "votes" from this process, poking fun at the extensive involvement of attorneys in the recount process. The team's website stated that fans could challenge the "results" at the team's Fan Services booth during the game.
  - The team also facetiously stated on its site that it would not make the results of that night's game official until mid-June—around the time that the entire Minnesota Supreme Court was scheduled to rule on Coleman's appeal of a panel ruling that Franken had won. (The Court issued its ruling in Franken's favor on June 30, with Coleman then conceding.)
- In May 2008, the Saints announced the giveaway of 2,500 bobble foot dolls, ostensibly to celebrate National Tap Dance Day. The dolls, which featured two feet visible beneath the door of a bathroom stall, were covered in the national news for their reference to Senator Larry Craig, who pled guilty to soliciting sex in a Minneapolis–Saint Paul Airport restroom in August 2007.
- In August 2007, the Saints announced that rubber dog toys would be given out, as a jab to the federal dogfighting case involving Atlanta Falcons quarterback Michael Vick.
- In April 2006, the Saints announced that rubber boats would be given out during a May 27, 2006 game, to honor the 30th anniversary of the television show The Love Boat. However, details of the promotion indicated that it was intended as a jab at the 2005 boat scandal involving the Minnesota Vikings, where several members of the team were allegedly involved in illicit behavior on a private cruise. The promotional rubber boats used the same color as the Vikings uniforms (purple and yellow) and were named Minnetonka Queen (a reference to Lake Minnetonka, where the cruise took place).
- On May 8, 2005, the Saints hosted a Mother's Day exhibition game against the Sioux Falls Canaries which began at 5:35 a.m. and set an unofficial record for earliest game time in baseball history. 2,253 fans attended the 6–6 tie, with about 500 of them tailgating overnight in the parking lot. Free cereal was given away and all ticket sales went to charity.
- In August 2004, the Saints held a Bobblehead Election to tap into the campaign buzz around the election year. Fans were told to select either a John Kerry or George Bush bobblehead as their "vote." The stunt was capped off with a speech by the winning bobblehead. A real donkey and a donkey dressed like an elephant (the Saints were unable to obtain a real elephant) added to the atmosphere.
- In August 2003, the Saints held "Randy Moss Hood Ornament Night", poking fun at Randy Moss, then a wide receiver for the Vikings. Earlier that year, Moss was involved in an incident where he bumped a traffic control officer with his car while he attempted to make a turn.
- During the 2002 Major League Baseball labor negotiations, the Saints gave away seat cushions with pictures of commissioner Bud Selig on one side and player's association Executive Director Donald Fehr on the other.
- In 2002, in response to Selig's controversial decision to end the MLB All-Star Game in a 7–7 tie, the Saints gave out neckties (or "ties") with Bud Selig's image.

== Season-by-season records ==
Table key
League	The team's final position in the league standings
Division	The team's final position in the divisional standings
GB	Games behind the team that finished in first place in the division that season
‡	Class champions (2021–present)
†	League champions (1993–present)
*	Division champions (1993–2022)
^	Postseason berth (1993–present)

Season-by-season records
Season	League	Regular-season					Postseason			MLB affiliate	Ref.
Season	League	Record	Win %	League	Division	GB	Record	Win %	Result	MLB affiliate	Ref.
1993^ †	NL	42–29	.592	1st	—	—	3–1	.750	Result	Won Second-Half title Won NL championship vs. Rochester Aces, 3–1	Independent
1994	NL	43–36	.544	3rd	—	8 1/2	—	—	—	Independent	
1995^ †	NL	53–31	.631	1st	—	—	3–1	.750	Won First and Second Half-titles; Won NL championship vs. Winnipeg Goldeyes, 3–1	Independent	
1996^ * †	NL	45–40	.529	3rd	1st	—	6–0	1.000	Won First-Half Eastern Division title vs. Madison Black Wolf, 1–0; Won Second-Half Eastern Division title Won Eastern Division title vs. Madison Black Wolf, 2–0; Won NL championship vs. Fargo-Moorhead RedHawks, 3–0	Independent	
1997^	NL	45–39	.536	4th	1st	—	2–3	.400	Won First-Half Eastern Division title Lost Eastern Division title vs. Duluth-Superior Dukes, 3–2	Independent	
1998^ *	NL	40–46	.465	4th (tie)	2nd	1/2	3–5	.375	Won Second-Half Eastern Division title Won Eastern Division title vs. Thunder Bay Whiskey Jacks, 3–2; Lost NL championship vs. Fargo-Moorhead RedHawks, 3–0	Independent	
1999	NL	38–47	.447	5th	2nd	5 1/2	—	—	—	Independent	
2000^	NL	43–43	.500	4th (tie)	1st (tie)	—	1–3	.250	Won First-Half Eastern Division title Lost Eastern Division title vs. Duluth-Superior Dukes, 3–1	Independent	
2001	NL	37–53	.411	6th (tie)	2nd (tie)	15	—	—	—	Independent	
2002	NL	39–50	.438	7th	4th	17	—	—	—	Independent	
2003^	NL	52–38	.578	3rd	2nd	3 1/2	2–3	.400	Won First-Half Northern Division title Lost Northern Division title vs. Winnipeg Goldeyes, 3–2	Independent	
2004^ * †	NL	61–34	.642	1st	1st	—	6–3	.667	Won Second-Half Northern Division title Won Northern Division title vs. Fargo-Moorhead RedHawks, 3–1; Won NL championship vs. Schaumburg Flyers, 3–2	Independent	
2005^	NL	55–40	.579	2nd	1st	—	2–3	.400	Won First-Half Southern Division title Lost Southern Division title vs. Gary SouthShore RailCats, 3–2	Independent	
2006^ *	AA	54–42	.563	4th	2nd	11	5–4	.556	Won Northern Division title vs. Lincoln Saltdogs, 3–1; Lost AA championship vs. Fort Worth Cats, 3–2	Independent	
2007^ *	AA	57–39	.594	2nd	2nd	1 1/2	5–3	.625	Won Second-Half Northern Division title Won North Division title vs. Lincoln Saltdogs, 3–0; Lost AA championship vs. Fort Worth Cats, 3–2	Independent	
2008	AA	42–54	.438	9th	5th	18	—	—	—	Independent	
2009	AA	49–47	.510	4th (tie)	2nd (tie)	9	—	—	—	Independent	
2010	AA	45–51	.469	7th	5th	18	—	—	—	Independent	
2011^	AA	56–44	.560	3rd	2nd	4	5–5	.500	Won semifinals vs. Winnipeg Goldeyes, 3–2; Lost AA championship vs. Grand Prairie AirHogs, 3–2	Independent	
2012	AA	52–48	.520	6th	3rd	13	—	—	—	Independent	
2013	AA	47–53	.470	9th	3rd	15	—	—	—	Independent	
2014	AA	48–52	.480	6th (tie)	2nd	15	—	—	—	Independent	
2015 *	AA	74–26	.740	2nd	1st	—	1–3	.250	Won Northern Division title Lost semifinals vs. Sioux City Explorers, 3–1	Independent	
2016 *	AA	61–39	.610	1st (tie)	1st	—	2–3	.400	Won Northern Division title Lost semifinals vs. Winnipeg Goldeyes, 3–2	Independent	
2017	AA	48–52	.480	7th	3rd	14	—	—	—	Independent	
2018^ *	AA	59–41	.590	4th (tie)	1st (tie)	—	4–4	.500	Won Northern Division title vs. Gary SouthShore RailCats, 3–1; Lost AA championship vs. Kansas City T-Bones, 3–1	Independent	
2019 * †	AA	64–36	.640	1st	1st	—	6–2	.750	Won Northern Division title Won semifinals vs. Fargo-Moorhead Redhawks, 3–2; Won AA championship vs. Sioux City Explorers, 3–0	Independent	
2020	AA	30–30	.500	3rd	—	4	—	—	—	Independent	
2021	AAAE	67–63 (Note: In 2021, the team with the best record at the end of the regular-season was declared the Triple-A East champion. St. Paul had a 61–59 (.508) record, 16 games behind first place, which put them 10th in the league and 3rd in their division. The regular-season was followed by the Triple-A Final Stretch, a 10-game postseason tournament in which all 30 Triple-A clubs competed for the highest winning percentage. St. Paul finished the tournament tied for 7th place with a 6–4 (.600) record.)	.515	10th	3rd	7	—	—	—	Minnesota Twins	
2022	IL	74–75	.497	10th (tie)	4th (tie)	17	—	—	—	Minnesota Twins	
2023	IL	84–64	.568	3rd	1st	—	—	—	—	Minnesota Twins	
2024	IL	70–79	.470	13th	7th	19 1/2	—	—	—	Minnesota Twins	
2025	IL	62–86	.419	17th (tie)	9th (tie)	24 1/2	—	—	—	Minnesota Twins	
2026	IL	82–67	.550	3rd	2nd	1/2	—	—	—	Minnesota Twins	
Totals	—	1,818–1,614	.530	—	—	—	56–46	.549	—	—	—

== Notes ==
Achievements
Preceded by First	Northern League champions St. Paul Saints; 1993	Succeeded by Winnipeg Goldeyes; 1994
Preceded by Winnipeg Goldeyes; 1994	Northern League champions St. Paul Saints; 1995 – 1996	Succeeded by Duluth–Superior Dukes; 1997
Preceded by Fargo-Moorhead RedHawks; 2003	Northern League champions St. Paul Saints; 2004	Succeeded by Gary SouthShore RailCats; 2005
