= Television Critics Association =

Entertainment industry organization

The Television Critics Association (TCA) is a group of approximately 200 American and Canadian television critics, journalists and columnists who cover television programming for newspapers, magazines and web publications. The TCA accepts applications and selects members twice per year in March and September. Once selected, all members meet at The Langham Huntington hotel and spa in Pasadena, California in January for the winter press tour, and at the Beverly Hilton in Beverly Hills in July for the summer press tour. Winter press tour usually covers network midseason replacements, programs from streaming services and cable series which start in January, while the summer tour covers the new fall season for broadcast, streaming, and cable programming, along with serving as a part of the campaigning of shows, creatives and cast after the release of nominations for the Primetime Emmy Awards.

== Press tours ==
Since 1979, tour allows the major television networks, cable networks, online streaming services and PBS to present their slate of upcoming programs to a large group of press writers from different outlets all at once through panels and interviews, along with 'state of the network' speeches and presentations; for instance, FX executive John Landgraf uses his network's winter session to present data and analytical information from his network's research department, including the number of series carried across all American networks and streaming services in a year to compare with FX's slate of original programming, one of which originated the Peak TV name, concept, and era. This is also the only time the general television media has rare access en masse to network executives. These biannual conferences involve registered TCA members staying at a chosen Los Angeles venue for two to three weeks, and each network is assigned a series of days to showcase their programming.

In the past, these interviews with program casts and creative staff (usually the show's primary showrunner, producers, and writers) were mainly used to compile stories over a six-month period which could be posted over that period as columns, Q&A responses to reader mail questions timed to a program/film/special's release, or within their weekly television listings supplements, mainly in newspapers or magazines for critics and columnists outside of large metropolitan areas. However, with the rise of the Internet and social media, these sessions now function to build buzz for programming within an immediate period, and only a few columnists for smaller publications and listing supplements maintain the former format of story release.

The January 2008 tour was canceled in December 2007 because of the 2007–08 Writers Guild of America strike and the uncertainty of its settlement. In 2015, Donald Trump was questioned by reporters during an appearance at the press tour regarding his claims about the ratings of The Celebrity Apprentice.

At the start of May 2020, the organization cancelled their summer 2020 tour and delayed the TCA Awards to a time to be determined in the wake of the coronavirus pandemic making any large gathering over two weeks impossible, along with the uncertainty over the 2020–21 television season, including the conversion of network upfront presentations to videotelephony platforms and the ability to produce programming. The next four semi-annual tours were held in a virtual format until it resumed an in-person event for the summer of 2022.

The tour was canceled again in the summer of 2023 due to another WGA strike, this time also including a concurrent strike by SAG-AFTRA and removing access to actors, though that year's TCA Awards went forward with winners revealed via press release. The event took place in winter 2024 and summer 2024. The 2025 winter tour was cancelled, with organizers citing reduced participation from networks and streaming platforms because "Hollywood is in a deep contraction." The 2025 summer tour was also cancelled, with organizers saying that despite initial commitments from networks and streaming services that historically financially support the event and reduced costs, the tentative participants later said their participation was not "financially viable." The organizers pointed to systemic changes in the Hollywood and journalism industry, including rounds of layoffs and a decrease in L.A.-based production, and said they were exploring alternate ways to connect members with talent and executives associated with new and returning shows. According to The Hollywood Reporter, many networks found it more cost-effective to organize events on their own studio lots in California or to do virtual sessions as adopted during the pandemic, and also had growing concerns about how confrontational Q&As with executives would play out in real-time on social media. Following the 2025 cancellation, TV critics Eric Deggans, Rob Owen, Rick Ellis and others wrote pieces outlining the challenges the event has faced, why they had found the press tour to be valuable and how its absence could lead to less substantial and critical coverage of the TV business.

== TCA Awards ==
The organization sponsors the TCA Awards, honoring television excellence in 11 categories, which are presented at the end of the summer press tour. The Awards began in 1985 at the Century Plaza Hotel in Los Angeles, California. The 2017 Awards were hosted by Kristin Chenoweth. The awards given in 2017 included; Program of the Year, Best New Program, Best Drama Series, Individual Achievement in Drama, Best Comedy Series, Individual Achievement in Comedy, Best Reality Programming, Best Youth Programming, & Best News and Information. In addition to these awards, each year the TCA grants the Heritage Award, given to a long-standing program that has culturally influenced society.

In 2018, the 34th TCA Awards were hosted by Robin Thede.
