= Anthony DeSclafani =

American baseball player (born 1990)

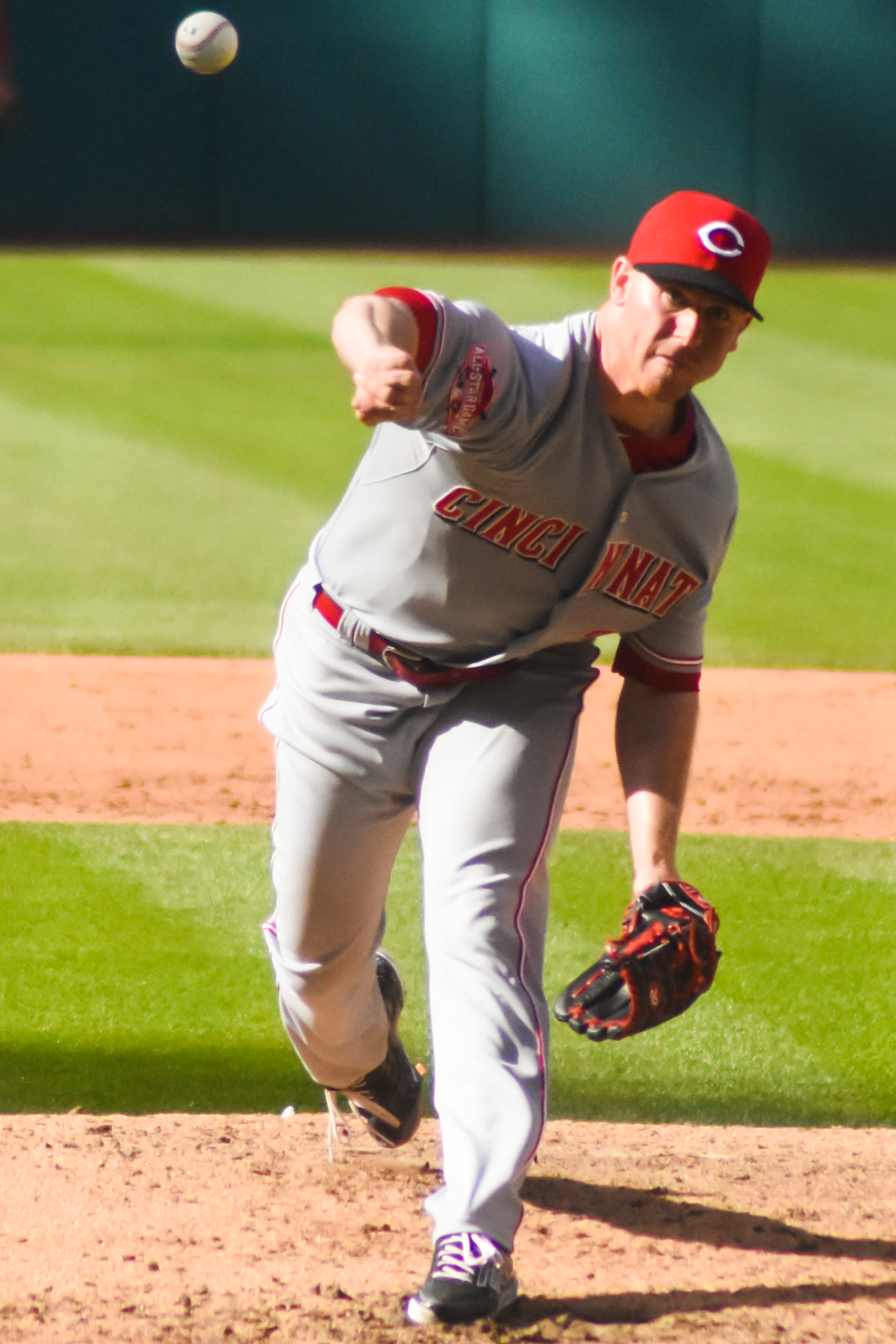
- DeSclafani with the Cincinnati Reds in 2015

Free agent
- Pitcher
- Born: April 18, 1990 (age 36); Freehold, New Jersey, U.S.
- Bats: Right Throws: Right

MLB debut
- May 14, 2014, for the Miami Marlins

MLB statistics (through 2025 season)
- Win–loss record: 55–58
- Earned run average: 4.24
- Strikeouts: 866
- Stats at Baseball Reference

Teams
- Miami Marlins (2014); Cincinnati Reds (2015–2016, 2018–2020); San Francisco Giants (2021–2023); Arizona Diamondbacks (2025)

Anthony James DeSclafani (born April 18, 1990) is an American professional baseball pitcher who is a free agent. He has previously played in Major League Baseball (MLB) for the Miami Marlins, Cincinnati Reds, San Francisco Giants, and Arizona Diamondbacks. DeSclafani played college baseball for the Florida Gators and was selected by the Toronto Blue Jays in the sixth round of the 2011 MLB draft. He made his MLB debut in 2014 with the Marlins.

== Early life ==
DeSclafani grew up in Howell Township, New Jersey, and attended Colts Neck High School (class of 2008) in Colts Neck Township, New Jersey.

== College career ==
The Boston Red Sox selected DeSclafani in the 22nd round of the 2008 Major League Baseball draft. Rather than accept a signing bonus of about $200,000, he enrolled at the University of Florida, where he played college baseball for the Florida Gators baseball team. In 2010, he played collegiate summer baseball in the Cape Cod Baseball League for the Yarmouth-Dennis Red Sox.

== Professional career ==
=== Toronto Blue Jays (2011–2012) ===
The Toronto Blue Jays selected DeSclafani in the sixth round of the 2011 MLB draft. He received a $250,000 signing bonus. In 2012, he pitched for the Lansing Lugnuts of the Single–A Midwest League. He was 11–3 with a 3.37 ERA, and his 11 wins tied for 4th in the league as his 1.8 walks/9 innings tied for 9th.

=== Miami Marlins (2012–2014) ===
==== Minor leagues ====
On November 19, 2012, the Blue Jays traded DeSclafani, Adeiny Hechavarria, Henderson Álvarez, Yunel Escobar, Jeff Mathis, Justin Nicolino, and Jake Marisnick to the Miami Marlins, receiving Mark Buehrle, Josh Johnson, José Reyes, John Buck, and Emilio Bonifacio in exchange. DeSclafani pitched for the Jupiter Hammerheads of the High–A Florida State League and the Jacksonville Suns of the Double–A Southern League in 2013. He pitched to a 9–6 win–loss record and a 2.65 earned run average in 129 innings across both levels, averaging 1.6 walks/9 innings. He was named a Florida State League mid-season All Star. The Marlins named him their minor league pitcher of the year after the season, and he was named an MILB.com Miami Organization All Star.

DeSclafani began the 2014 season with Jacksonville, after being ranked by Baseball America as the Marlins' fifth-best prospect.

==== Major leagues ====
The Marlins promoted him to the major leagues to make his debut on May 14 with a win against the Dodgers in Los Angeles. DeSclafani struck out seven and also had two hits in the game. He was optioned back to the New Orleans Zephyrs of the Triple–A Pacific Coast League on August 16, with the return of Henderson Álvarez. During a game against the Milwaukee Brewers on September 11, DeSclafani was ejected for the first time in his MLB career after intentionally hitting Carlos Gómez with a pitch. The next day, DeSclafani was suspended three games and fined an undisclosed amount by MLB.

In the majors in 2014 he made 5 starts and 8 relief appearances, and in the minors he was 6–7, 3.78 ERA in 19 starts and one relief appearance for Double–A Jacksonville and Triple–A New Orleans. After the season he pitched for Salt River in the Arizona Fall League and was 1–0 with a 2.67 ERA in 27 innings, and was second in the AFL in strikeouts.

=== Cincinnati Reds (2015–2020) ===
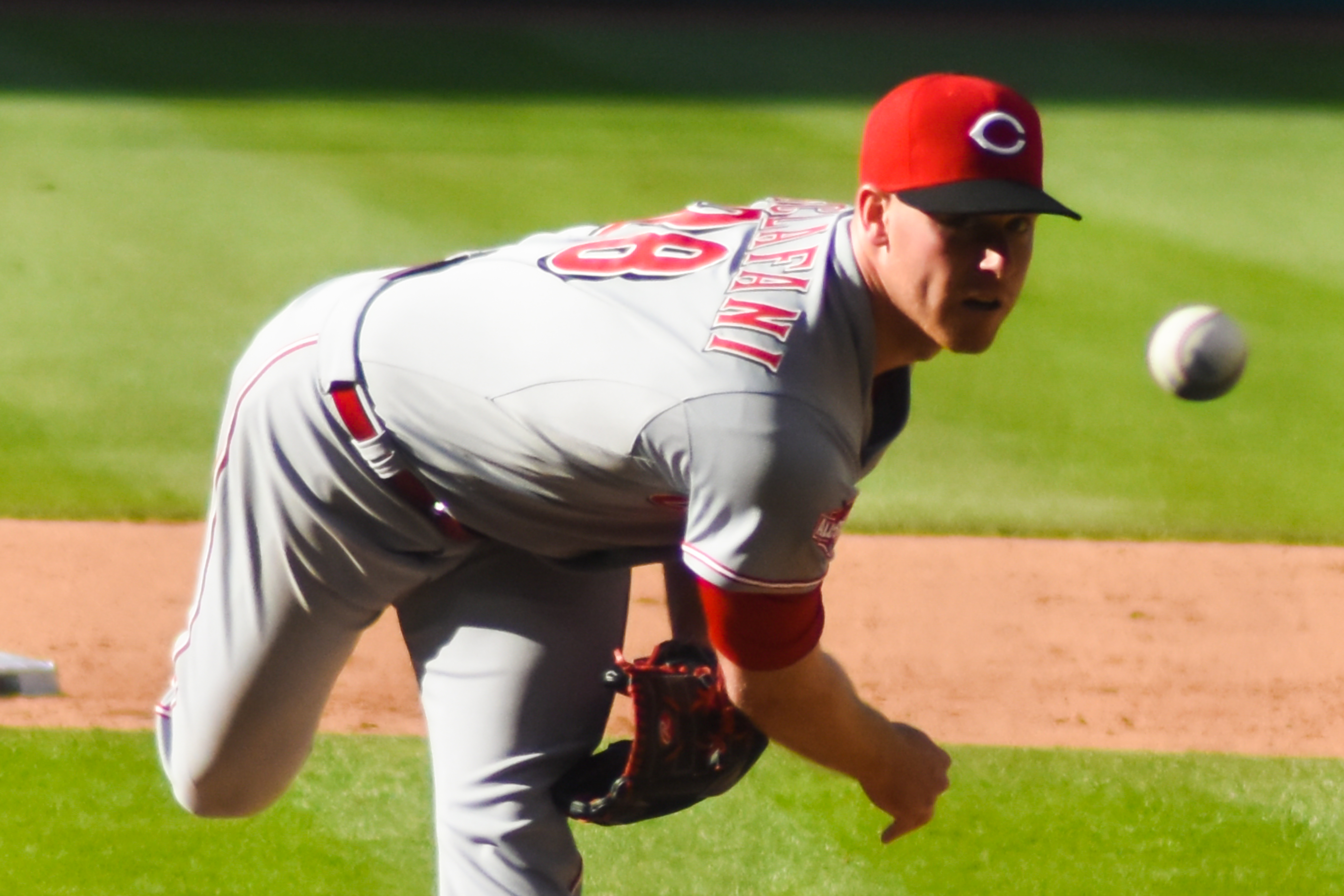
DeSclafani in 2015

On December 11, 2014, the Marlins traded DeSclafani and Chad Wallach to the Cincinnati Reds in exchange for Mat Latos. DeSclafani earned his first win as a Reds pitcher and, subsequently, the first win for a starting pitcher for the Reds in 2015 with a 3–2 win over the Cubs on April 14, 2015. He pitched in 31 starts for the Reds, finishing with a record of 9–13 and a 4.05 ERA in 184.2 innings. He was named to the Baseball America Major League All-Rookie Team.

In 2016, he had 20 starts after a few stints on the disabled list, and went 9–5 (which included a shutout) with a 3.28 ERA in 123.1 innings.

In 2017, DeSclafani experienced pain in his right elbow at the beginning of spring training. He was diagnosed with tendinitis and was immediately shut down. He was later diagnosed with a sprained ulnar collateral ligament of the elbow (UCL), and began the season on the disabled list. The Reds sent him on a minor league rehab assignment at the end of July, but a reoccurrence of the tendinitis ended the rehab stint. His UCL had recovered. He went on the 60-day disabled list, which effectively ended his season without him appearing in an MLB game.

After missing almost 2 years because of multiple injuries, DeSclafani was activated to start on June 5, 2018, against the Colorado Rockies. In a June 23 game against the Chicago Cubs, DeSclafani hit a grand slam off of Brian Duensing. The last Reds pitcher to hit a grand slam was Bob Purkey, also against the Cubs, in 1959. DeSclafani was the starting pitcher and earned the win as the Reds defeated the Cubs 11–2. He completed the remainder of the season, starting 21 games, posting a 7–8 record with a 4.93 ERA in 115 innings. His curveball spin rate was in the lowest 1% in baseball.

In 2019, Desclafani played a full season, pitching third in the Reds' starting rotation behind Luis Castillo and Sonny Gray. He started 31 games, with a 9–9 record and a 3.89 ERA in 166.2 innings in which he struck out 167 batters while walking 49.

On July 23, 2020, one day into the quarantine-shortened season, the Reds placed Desclafani on the 10-day injured list with a strained back muscle. He was activated August 2, making his first start of the season that afternoon. In the shortened 2020 season, in 33.2 innings he was 1–2 with a 7.22 ERA. His curveball spin rate was in the lowest 1% in baseball.

=== San Francisco Giants (2021–2023) ===
On December 16, 2020, the San Francisco Giants signed DeSclafani to a one-year, $6 million contract. On April 26, 2021, he threw a complete-game shutout against the Colorado Rockies with 9 strikeouts, winning 12–0. In the 2021 regular season, he was 13–7 with 2 shutouts (tied for the National League lead) and a 3.17 ERA in 31 starts covering 167.2 innings. He was 10th in the NL in wins, as a batter he was 10th in sacrifice hits (7), and on defense he tied for the NL lead among pitchers with a perfect fielding percentage of 1.000.

On November 22, 2021, DeSclafani re-signed with the Giants on a 3-year, $36 million contract. DeSclafani missed most of the 2022 after undergoing right ankle surgery, to set a subluxed peroneal tendon in his drive ankle, following a start of the season in which in six starts he was 0-2 and had a 6.63 ERA in 19 innings.

In 19 games (18 starts) for the Giants in 2023, he posted a 4–8 record and 4.88 ERA with 79 strikeouts in 99 2/3 innings pitched. On July 30, 2023, DeSclafani was placed on the injured list with a right elbow flexor strain. On August 5, he received a platelet-rich plasma injection and was shut down from throwing for 6–8 weeks. DeSclafani was transferred to the 60–day injured list on August 14, effectively ending his season.

=== Minnesota Twins (2024) ===
On January 5, 2024, the Giants traded DeSclafani, Mitch Haniger and cash considerations to the Seattle Mariners for Robbie Ray. On January 29, the Mariners traded DeSclafani, Justin Topa, Gabriel González, Darren Bowen, and cash considerations to the Minnesota Twins in exchange for Jorge Polanco. He was placed on the 60–day injured list with a right elbow strain to begin the season. On March 30, it was announced that DeSclafani would miss the entirety of the season after undergoing flexor tendon surgery.

=== New York Yankees (2025) ===
On May 13, 2025, DeSclafani signed a minor league contract with the New York Yankees. In five starts for the Triple-A Scranton/Wilkes-Barre RailRiders, he posted a 1–1 record and 4.50 ERA with 20 strikeouts over 20 innings of work. DeSclafani was released by the Yankees organization after opting out of his contract on June 12.

=== Arizona Diamondbacks ===
On June 15, 2025, DeSclafani signed a major league contract with the Arizona Diamondbacks. In 13 appearances (four starts) for Arizona, he logged a 1–2 record and 5.12 ERA with 36 strikeouts and two saves across 38 2/3 innings pitched. On September 15, DeSclafani was designated for assignment by the Diamondbacks. He was released by the team after clearing waivers on September 18.

== Personal life ==
DeSclafani and his wife, Lauren, married in January 2019. They had their first child, a son, in August 2020. They reside in Freehold, New Jersey.

== See also ==
- List of Major League Baseball annual shutout leaders
