= Justin Topa =

American baseball player (born 1991)

Free agent
- Pitcher
- Born: March 7, 1991 (age 35); Binghamton, New York, U.S.
- Bats: Right Throws: Right

MLB debut
- September 1, 2020, for the Milwaukee Brewers

MLB statistics (through 2026 season)
- Win–loss record: 6–11
- Earned run average: 4.19
- Strikeouts: 144
- Stats at Baseball Reference

Teams
- Milwaukee Brewers (2020–2022); Seattle Mariners (2023); Minnesota Twins (2024–2026); New York Yankees (2026)

Justin Robert Topa (born March 7, 1991) is an American professional baseball pitcher who is a free agent. He has previously played in Major League Baseball (MLB) for Milwaukee Brewers, Seattle Mariners, Minnesota Twins, and New York Yankees. Topa was drafted by the Pittsburgh Pirates in the 2013 MLB draft.

== Amateur career ==
Topa was a four-year letter winner at Chenango Valley High School where he led his team to the Section 4 Class-B Championships in 2008 and 2009. He was named to the All-Conference team and third-team All-State squad as a pitcher while also earning All-Division as a second baseman. He also played on the golf, hockey and basketball teams.

Topa attended LIU Brooklyn where he finished his college baseball career with 20 wins, 200 strikeouts and 13 complete games. He was named NEC Rookie of the week three times, Louisville Slugger Player of the Week, Northeast Pitcher of the Week, and ECAC Co-Pitcher of the week honors during the 2010 season. He missed the 2012 season recovering from Tommy John surgery. Despite the injury, the Cincinnati Reds drafted him in the 33rd round of the 2012 MLB draft, but he did not sign with the team.

== Career ==
=== Pittsburgh Pirates ===
The Pittsburgh Pirates drafted Topa in the 17th round, 509th overall, of the 2013 MLB draft. He signed with the team on June 13 and made his professional debut with the Jamestown Jammers of the New York–Penn League on June 18, 2013, in relief at the Mahoning Valley Scrappers pitching one inning, allowing one hit, and striking out one. Topa finished the season with a 5–2 win–loss record and 2.19 earned run average (ERA). Topa spent 2014 with the West Virginia Power. He missed the 2015 season recovering from a second Tommy John surgery on his throwing elbow. He played for the Bradenton Marauders in 2016. Topa was released by the Pirates on April 1, 2017.

=== Rockland Boulders ===
In May 2017, Topa signed with the Rockland Boulders of the Can-Am League. He pitched in 20 games for Rockland, carrying a 3.50 ERA with 80 strikeouts over 110 2/3 innings pitched. He also rediscovered his love of baseball in the independent league. He began the 2018 season with Rockland as well an appeared in 4 games with the club, pitching to a 4.43 ERA with 15 strikeouts over 20.1 innings with the club.

=== Texas Rangers ===
On June 17, 2018, Topa signed a minor league contract with the Texas Rangers. He spent the majority of the season with the Double-A Frisco RoughRiders and also appeared in one game for the High-A Down East Wood Ducks. In 9 games (6 starts) for Frisco, Topa recorded a 5.71 ERA with 34 strikeouts across 41 innings. He elected free agency following the season on November 2.

=== Milwaukee Brewers ===
On March 28, 2019, Topa signed a minor league contract with the Milwaukee Brewers. He spent the majority of the season with the Biloxi Shuckers and also played for the Carolina Mudcats. On July 28, 2020, the Brewers added Topa to their 60-man player pool. Topa was called up to the majors for the first time on August 31, 2020 and made his debut that night against the Detroit Tigers. Topa pitched two innings allowing two runs on two hits while striking out two. Topa finished the season with the Brewers and pitched two scoreless innings in Game 1 of the NL Wild Card Series.

On March 29, 2021, it was announced that Topa had suffered a flexor tendon strain and would miss the first half of the 2021 season. On April 6, Topa was placed on the 60-day injured list. On September 4, Topa was activated off of the injured list.

On May 30, 2022, Topa was placed on the 60-day injured list with an elbow injury. He was activated on August 13 and optioned to the Triple-A Nashville Sounds. In parts of three seasons with the Brewers, Topa had an 8.35 ERA in 18 1/3 innings.

=== Seattle Mariners ===
On January 7, 2023, the Brewers traded Topa to the Seattle Mariners for minor league pitcher Joseph Hernandez. The Mariners traded for Topa because he excelled at inducing ground balls. Topa was optioned to the Triple-A Tacoma Rainiers to begin the 2023 season, but joined the team on April 10. In 75 relief outings, Topa registered a 2.61 ERA with 61 strikeouts, 3 saves and two blown saves across 69 innings of work.

=== Minnesota Twins ===
On January 29, 2024, the Mariners traded Topa, Anthony DeSclafani, Gabriel González, Darren Bowen, and cash to the Minnesota Twins for Jorge Polanco. On May 15, Topa was diagnosed with a partial tear in the patellar tendon in his left knee. He subsequently received a platelet-rich plasma injection and was shut down for six weeks. Topa was activated from the injured list on September 25. He pitched in three of the Twins' final five games of the season, allowing no runs and one hit in 2 1/3 innings.

Topa made 54 appearances (including one start) for the Twins during the 2025 season, registering a 1–5 record and 3.90 ERA with 49 strikeouts and four saves over 60 innings of work.

Topa made 23 appearances for Minnesota in 2026, but struggled to an 0-1 record and 8.05 ERA with 12 strikeouts and two saves over 19 innings of work. On May 19, 2026, Topa was designated for assignment. Topa was released by the Twins on May 23.

=== Toronto Blue Jays ===
On May 30, 2026, Topa signed a minor league contract with the Toronto Blue Jays. He made eight appearances for the Triple–A Buffalo Bisons, recording a 3.38 ERA with four strikeouts across eight innings pitched. Topa was released by the Blue Jays on July 4.

=== Kansas City Royals ===
On July 7, 2026, Topa signed a minor league contract with the Kansas City Royals. He made 12 appearances for the Triple–A Omaha Storm Chasers, recording an 0.71 ERA with nine strikeouts and four saves across 12 2/3 innings pitched. Topa was released by the Royals on August 9.

=== New York Yankees ===
On August 14, 2026, Topa signed a minor league contract with the New York Yankees. He made four appearances for the Triple–A Scranton/Wilkes-Barre RailRiders, recording a 1.80 ERA with two strikeouts over five innings of work. On August 25, the Yankees selected Topa's contract, adding him to their active roster. He made two scoreless appearances for the team, recording three strikeouts across three innings pitched. Topa was designated for assignment by the Yankees on August 29. He elected free agency after clearing waivers on August 31. Topa re-signed with the Yankees on a new minor league contract the same day. He elected free agency on November 2.

== Personal life ==
Topa's wife Trish had their first child in 2023.

Growing up, Topa was a batboy for the minor league Binghamton Mets.

Topa remains close friends with Jamie Keefe, his manager with the Rockland Boulders.

Topa has collected baseball cards since he was a child, along with his father. In 2024, he appeared on Topps baseball cards for the first time, initially in a Seattle Mariners team card. Topa posted on social media that he wanted to collect different versions of the Mariners card. Topps created a card of Topa in a later 2024 set, which the Topas also collected.
