= List of programs broadcast by FX =

Current FX logo, used since April 3, 2013

The following are programs broadcast by FX.

== Current programming ==
=== Drama ===
Title	Genre	Premiere	Seasons	Runtime	Status
American Horror Story (Note: Episodes premiere at the same time on Hulu as part of FX on Hulu from season 13 onward.)	Horror anthology	October 5, 2011	13 seasons, 145 episodes	22–73 min	Renewed
Shōgun (Note: Episodes air earlier on Hulu as part of FX on Hulu)	Historical drama	February 27, 2024	1 season, 10 episodes	53–70 min	Renewed
Alien: Earth (Note: Episodes premiere at the same time on Hulu as part of FX on Hulu)	Science fiction horror	August 12, 2025	1 season, 8 episodes	44–63 min	Renewed
Love Story	Period romance anthology	February 12, 2026	1 season, 9 episodes	42–58 min	Pending
The Shards	Teen thriller	August 5, 2026	1 season, 9 episodes	24–54 min	Pending
The Drop: A Snowfall Saga	Crime drama	September 8, 2026	1 season, 8 episodes	42–57 min	Pending

=== Comedy ===
Title	Genre	Premiere	Seasons	Runtime	Status
The Lowdown (Note: Episodes premiere at the same time on Hulu as part of FX on Hulu from season 2 onward.)	Crime comedy drama	September 23, 2025	2 seasons, 16 episodes	40–59 min	Season 2 ongoing

=== Syndicated programming ===
- According to Jim (2025)
- Adults (2026) (Note: An FX Original for season 1. Episodes premiere at the same time on FXX and seasons are released on Hulu as part of FX on Hulu from season 2 onward.)
- It's Always Sunny in Philadelphia (2026) (Note: An FX Original from seasons 1–8. Episodes premiere at the same time on FXX and Hulu as part of FX on Hulu from season 18 onward.)

== Upcoming programming ==
=== Drama ===
Title	Genre	Premiere	Seasons	Runtime	Status
Cry Wolf	Psychological thriller miniseries	TBA	TBA	TBA	Post-production
Disinherited	Crime drama	TBA	TBA	TBA	Filming
Far Cry	Action adventure anthology	TBA	TBA	TBA	Filming
Legends	Meta thriller miniseries	TBA	TBA	TBA	Series order
The Marriage Plot	Drama miniseries	TBA	TBA	TBA	Series order
Seven Sisters	Family drama	TBA	TBA	TBA	Series order

=== Comedy ===
Title	Genre	Premiere	Seasons	Runtime	Status
Very Young Frankenstein	Comedy	TBA	TBA	TBA	Filming

=== Pilots ===
==== Drama ====
- Untitled Wong Kar-wai/Hiro Murai crime drama

=== In development ===
==== Drama ====
- The Bottoms
- Burnfield
- King of Ashes
- Mother Doom
- One First Street
- A Really Bad Person
- That Texas Blood
- Untitled Backcountry Unit Search and Rescue series
- Untitled Sammy the Bull series

==== Comedy ====
- Hopeless
- Last Night Was a Movie
- Untitled Beck Bennett series
- Wildwood

== Former programming ==
=== Original programming ===
==== Drama ====
- The Shield (2002–08)
- Nip/Tuck (2003–10)
- Rescue Me (2004–11)
- Over There (2005)
- Dirt (2007–08)
- The Riches (2007–08)
- Damages (2007–10) (Note: Moved to Audience Network)
- Sons of Anarchy (2008–14)
- Justified (2010–15)
- Terriers (2010)
- Lights Out (2011)
- The Americans (2013–18)
- The Bridge (2013–14)
- Fargo (2014–24)
- Tyrant (2014–16)
- The Strain (2014–17)
- The Bastard Executioner (2015)
- American Crime Story (2016–21)
- Legion (2017–19)
- Feud (2017–24)
- Snowfall (2017–23)
- Pose (2018–21)
- Mayans M.C. (2018–23)
- The Old Man (2022–24)
- American Sports Story (2024)
- Grotesquerie (2024)
- The Beauty (2026)

==== Comedy ====
- Son of the Beach (2000–02)
- Lucky (2003)
- It's Always Sunny in Philadelphia (2005–12) (Note: Moved to FXX)
- Starved (2005)
- The League (2009–12)
- Louie (2010–15)
- Wilfred (2011–13)
- Anger Management (2012–14)
- Totally Biased with W. Kamau Bell (2012–13)
- Legit (2013)
- Saint George (2014)
- You're the Worst (2014)
- Married (2014–15)
- Partners (2014)
- The Comedians (2015)
- Sex & Drugs & Rock & Roll (2015–16)
- Baskets (2016–19)
- Atlanta (2016–22)
- Better Things (2016–22)
- What We Do in the Shadows (2019–24)
- English Teacher (2024–25)
- Adults (2025)
- The Bear (season 5, 2026)

==== Miniseries ====
- Thief (2006)
- Trust (2018)
- Fosse/Verdon (2019)
- Justified: City Primeval (2023)

==== Animation ====
- The Dick & Paula Celebrity Special (1999)
- Archer (2009–16)
- Unsupervised (2012)
- Chozen (2014)

==== Co-productions ====
- Testees (2008–09)
- Taboo (2017)
- Mr Inbetween (2018–21)
- A Christmas Carol (2019)
- Breeders (2020–23)
- Black Narcissus (2020)

==== Docuseries ====
- Lost & Found (1995–98)
- Baseball, Minnesota (1996–98)
- The Weekly (2019)
- The New York Times Presents (2020–24)
- A Wilderness of Error (2020)
- Hip Hop Uncovered (2021)
- Pride (2021)
- Children of the Underground (2022)
- Welcome to Wrexham (2022–25)
- Dear Mama (2023)
- The Secrets of Hillsong (2023)
- Social Studies (2024)

==== Variety ====
- No Relation (1996–98)
- Bobcat's Big Ass Show (1998–99)
- American Baby (1998–2002)
- Healthy Kids (1998–2002)
- The X Show (1999–2001)
- The New Movie Show with Chris Gore (2000)
- Your Favorite Girl Next Door (2000–01)
- DVD on TV (2003–2014)
- The Orlando Jones Show (2003)
- Todd TV (2004)
- NASCAR Drivers: 360 (2004–05)
- 30 Days (2005–08)
- Black. White. (2006)
- Brand X with Russell Brand (2012–13)
- FX Movie Download (2014–19)
- The Choe Show (2021)

=== Syndicated programming ===
- Home and Away (June 1994–February 1995) (first American broadcast)
- Dynasty (1994–95; 1997–98)
- The Ghost & Mrs. Muir (1994–96)
- The Green Hornet (1994–96)
- Wonder Woman (1994–96)
- Family Affair (1994–97)
- Fantasy Island (1994–97)
- The Greatest American Hero (1994–97)
- The Life and Times of Grizzly Adams (1994–97)
- Nanny and the Professor (1994–97)
- Okavango: The Wild Frontier (1994–97)
- Batman (1994–98)
- Eight Is Enough (1994–98)
- Hart to Hart (1994–98)
- Mission: Impossible (1994–98; 2000)
- In Living Color (1994–2002)
- Hooperman (1995–96)
- Rawhide (1995–96)
- Vegas (1995–98)
- Trapper John, M.D. (1995–99)
- Picket Fences (1995–2000)
- The A-Team (1996–99)
- The Fall Guy (1996–99)
- Miami Vice (1996–99)
- 21 Jump Street (1997–98)
- NYPD Blue (1997–2001)
- The X-Files (1997–2002)
- M*A*S*H (1998–2003)
- Beverly Hills, 90210 (1998–2004)
- Millennium (1999–2001)
- Married... with Children (1999–2008)
- Ally McBeal (2001–04)
- World's Wildest Police Videos (2001–04)
- Buffy the Vampire Slayer (2001–08; 2013–16)
- The Practice (2001–10)
- Cops (2003–06)
- Arrested Development (2004)
- Fear Factor (2004–08)
- King of the Hill (2004–08)
- Dharma & Greg (2005–08)
- Prison Break (2005–08; 2017)
- Spin City (2005–10)
- That '70s Show (2005–10)
- Malcolm in the Middle (2007–11)
- The Bernie Mac Show (2008–11)
- Lie to Me (2010)
- Two and a Half Men (2010–17)
- How I Met Your Mother (2011–19)
- Running Wilde (2011)
- Are You Smarter than a 5th Grader? (2011–13)
- Ben and Kate (2012)
- The Ultimate Fighter (2012–13)
- Dads (2013)
- Ellen (2013–17)
- Mike & Molly (2014–21)
- The Grinder (2015–16)
- Scream Queens (2015–16)
- Wayward Pines (2015–16)
- The Exorcist (2016)
- 24: Legacy (2017)
- Everything's Gonna Be Okay (2020)
- Mom (2021–23)
- Family Guy (2021–24)
- Reservation Dogs (2023)
- Black-ish (2023–25)
- The Bear (2024–25)
- Scrubs (2026)

== Live programming ==
- The FX Apartment

FX Networks leased the first three floors of the building at 212 Fifth Avenue, which overlooks Madison Square Park in New York City. The first floor contained sales offices and the control room, and the third floor contained production offices. Programming was broadcast from a functional apartment on the second floor. The apartment had several rooms. First was a large common room that contained the living room, dining room, and kitchen areas. Other rooms included a small library, a game room (complete with arcade and pinball machines) and a fully functioning restroom. At the rear of the apartment was a large "ballroom" that served several purposes. A third-floor balcony lined the ballroom. The network's shows would often venture into Madison Square Park for some features, especially in the summer. FX's lease on the building expired on December 31, 1998. All furnishings were auctioned and the building has since been renovated.

- Breakfast Time (1994–96)

An off-the-cuff morning show with lifestyle segments and "roving reporters" (aka "Road Warriors") who visited unique sites across the country each day. This was the network's flagship show and utilized every room of the apartment. Hosted by Tom Bergeron, Laurie Hibberd and Bob the Puppet. Aired 7 a.m. to 9 a.m. ET.

- Personal fX: The Collectibles Show (1994–98)

The Collectibles Show - similar to Antiques Roadshow, in which collectors would have unique items appraised in-studio, and a "roving reporter" would visit collectors nationwide. Broadcast from the "Dining Room." The last live show to be canceled. Hosted by Claire Carter and John Burke. Aired Noon to 1 p.m. ET.

- The Pet Department (1994–98)

A call-in/interview show about domesticated pets. Usually broadcast from the "Game Room." Hosted by Steve Walker, Luann Lee, dog trainer Andrea Arden and fX's pet dog Jack. Suzanne Whang replaced Lee after her departure. Aired 2:30 p.m. to 3:00pm ET.

- Under Scrutiny with Jane Wallace (1994–95)

An in-depth news program broadcast each night from the "Library." Given a CableACE Award for news programming in 1995. The first live show to be canceled. Hosted by Jane Wallace. Aired 7 p.m. to 7:30 p.m. ET.

- Sound fX (1994–95)

A show dealing with all things music, from the latest major artists to the most creative garage band tactics. Music videos were regularly shown on this show, which originated from the "Ballroom." Hosted by Karyn Bryant, Orlando Jones, and Matt Ostrum. Jeff Probst replaced Jones after his departure. Aired 11 p.m. to Midnight ET.

- Backchat (1994–98)

fX ended each broadcast day with a viewer mail show. Viewers could write, call, or e-mail comments about fX and its shows, and the host would spend 30 minutes each night reading and responding to these comments. Broadcast from the "Kitchen." Hosted by Jeff Probst and Jane Fergus. Aired 12:30 a.m. to 1:00 a.m. ET. Near the end of its run, Backchat was pre-taped and moved to 7:30 p.m. to 8:00 p.m. ET.

Some of the young talent discovered on the fX network that have moved on to larger, more successful projects include:

- Tom Bergeron (Host, Breakfast Time) - Host of America's Funniest Home Videos, Dancing with the Stars, and Hollywood Squares
- Laurie Hibberd (Host, Breakfast Time) - Reporter for CBS's The Early Show and wife of Live with Regis and Kelly producer Michael Gelman.
- Orlando Jones (Co-host, Sound fX) - Actor (Evolution, Office Space, MADtv) and perhaps most famous as pitchman for 7 Up.
- Jeff Probst (Host, Backchat; Co-host, Sound fX) - Host of Survivor, and The Jeff Probst Show
- Phil Keoghan (Road Warrior, Breakfast Time) - Host of The Amazing Race
- John Burke (Road Warrior, Personal fX) - Host of E! News Live

Before each show aired, and during commercial breaks, a "channel host" would appear and inform viewers about something upcoming within the episode. Some updates featured trivia about the current show, while some were merely observations. These can be compared to in-vision continuity announcers in Britain.

== Sports ==
=== Former ===
The first venture by fX into sports occurred in September 1995, when The fX Sports Show, an hour-long highlights and analysis show, debuted; it was hosted by Jim Rome and Kevin Frazier, along with the pregame crew and commentators from Fox NFL Sunday providing contributions. Unlike most of fX's other studio programming at the time, it originated from the facilities of Fox Sports in Hollywood, as opposed to the fX Apartment in New York. The show, airing Sunday nights at 11pm, only lasted a single season.

Following Fox's partnering with Liberty Media to form Fox Sports Net, Liberty took an equity stake in fX as well (organized under the banner of Fox/Liberty Networks), resulting in fX becoming the national cable home for Fox Sports programming. This included a package of Major League Baseball games – initially aired on Monday nights before moving to Saturday nights in 1998 – and college football; for a short time, newsbreaks provided by Fox Sports News also began to air during FX's primetime lineup.

FX aired selected NASCAR events from the NEXTEL Cup Series and NASCAR Busch Series from February to June of each year from 2001 to 2006 as part of Fox's NASCAR television package. However, coverage ended after the June 30, 2006, Busch Series race at Daytona International Speedway. When NASCAR signed its new contract effective in 2007, FX was left out as Fox retained its rights and gained the right to broadcast weather-delayed races that aired on the network.

The channel also aired one game in the Major League Baseball postseason from 2001 to 2005, on the first Wednesday night of League Championship Series week when MLB schedules two games at the same time. On that night, Fox distributed one game to local affiliates based on a regional coverage map, and the other game aired on the corresponding cable affiliate of FX, the main DirecTV or Dish Network channel, or an alternate channel on the satellite services.

With a new MLB TV contract signed, again excluding FX, the last such broadcast was scheduled for October 11, 2006, but that night's NLCS game between the St. Louis Cardinals and New York Mets was rained out, making the Detroit Tigers-Oakland Athletics game in the ALCS a national broadcast; FX aired the movie Any Given Sunday instead. Both series were played on October 13, but Fox showed both games, with the ALCS during the day and the NLCS at night.

Other sports events seen on FX have included the NFL's development league-NFL Europa, formerly the World League of American Football; college football; college basketball; and the World Cup of Hockey in 1996.

With the August 2013 launch of national sports cable network Fox Sports 1, FX no longer served as a cable outlet for Fox Sports.

=== Current ===
The Walt Disney Company acquired exclusive broadcasting rights to the XFL in 2022 and, beginning with the 2023 season, began to air games on FX, in addition to ESPN and ABC.

== See also ==
- FXX
- FX Movie Channel
- Hulu
