= Gabriel González (baseball) =

Venezuelan baseball player (born 2004)

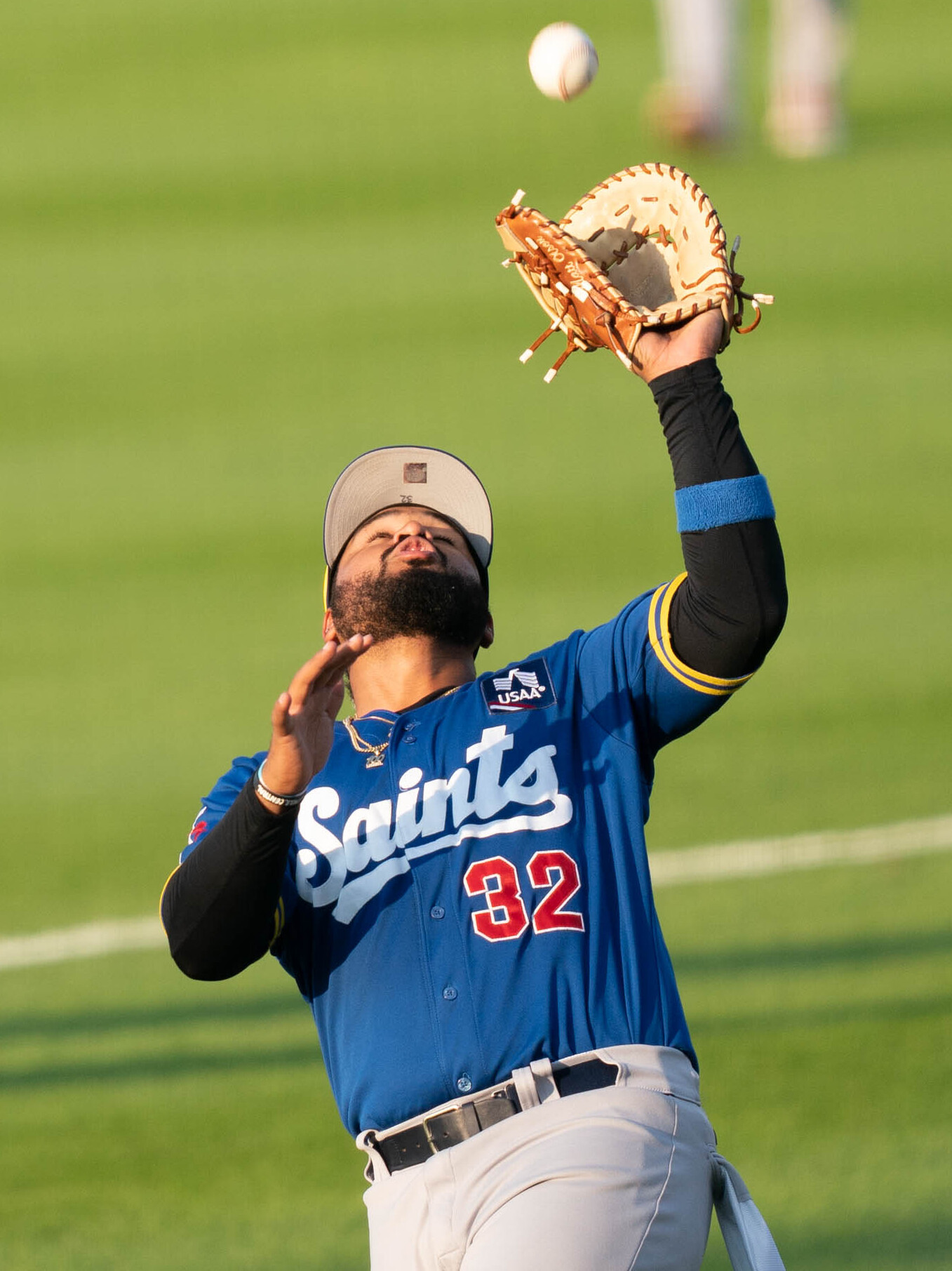
- González with the St. Paul Saints in 2026

Minnesota Twins – No. 72
- Outfielder
- Born: January 4, 2004 (age 22); Carúpano, Venezuela
- Bats: Right Throws: Right

MLB debut
- May 22, 2026, for the Minnesota Twins

MLB statistics (through 2026 season)
- Batting average: .250
- Home runs: 0
- Runs batted in: 0
- Stats at Baseball Reference

Teams
- Minnesota Twins (2026–present)

Gabriel Jesús González (born January 4, 2004) is a Venezuelan professional baseball outfielder for the Minnesota Twins of Major League Baseball (MLB). He made his MLB debut in 2026.

== Career ==
=== Seattle Mariners ===
González signed with the Seattle Mariners as an international free agent on February 5, 2021. He made his professional debut that year with the Dominican Summer League Mariners.

González started 2022 with the rookie-level Arizona Complex League Mariners before being promoted to the Modesto Nuts. In 67 appearances for the two affiliates, González batted a combined .321/.410/.468 with seven home runs, 34 RBI, and nine stolen bases. He started 2023 with Modesto and was promoted to the Everett AquaSox in July.

=== Minnesota Twins ===
On January 29, 2024, the Mariners traded González, Anthony DeSclafani, Justin Topa, Darren Bowen, and cash considerations to the Minnesota Twins in exchange for Jorge Polanco.

González split the 2025 season between the High-A Cedar Rapids Kernels, Double-A Wichita Wind Surge, and Triple-A St. Paul Saints, batting .329/.395/.513 with 15 home runs and 66 RBI. On November 18, 2025, the Twins added González to their 40-man roster to protect him from the Rule 5 draft.

González was optioned to Triple-A St. Paul to begin the 2026 season. In 44 appearances for the Saints, he batted .216/.294/.392 with eight home runs and 21 RBI. On May 22, 2026, González was promoted to the major leagues for the first time.
