= Equity Bank Park =

Baseball park in Wichita, Kansas, US

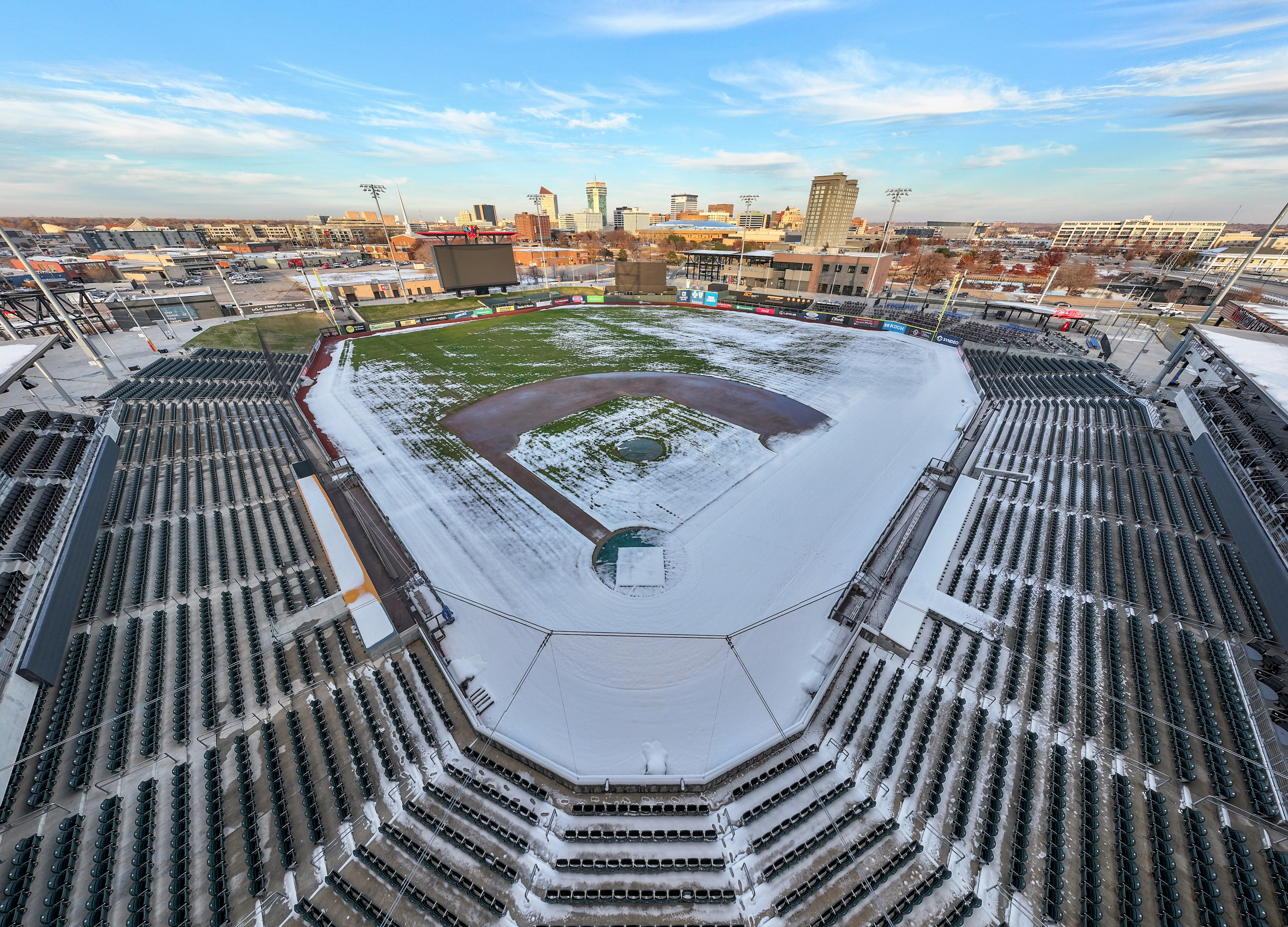
- Equity Bank Park from above home plate in 2023

- Location within Kansas Location within the United States
- Interactive map of Equity Bank Park
- Former names: Riverfront Stadium (2021–2024)
- Address: 275 S. McLean Blvd. Wichita, Kansas; United States
- Coordinates: 37°40′53″N 97°20′45″W
- Owner: City of Wichita
- Operator: Wichita Wind Surge
- Capacity: 10,025 seated; 12,000 (baseball); 18,000 (concerts)
- Executive suites: 12
- Record attendance: 10,442 (September 16, 2023; Wichita Wind Surge vs. Midland RockHounds)
- Field size: Left field: 340 ft (100 m); Center field: 400 ft (120 m); Right field: 325 ft (99 m)

Construction
- Groundbreaking: February 13, 2019
- Opened: April 10, 2021
- Cost: $75 million
- Architects: DLR Group; SJCF Architecture
- Structural engineer: Professional Engineering Consultants
- Services engineer: Professional Engineering Consultants
- General contractor: JE Dunn/EBY

Tenants
- Wichita Turbo Tubs (PCL/TL) 2020–present NBC World Series 2019

Website
- www.milb.com/wichita/ballpark

Equity Bank Park, known as Riverfront Stadium from 2021 to 2024, is a baseball park in downtown Wichita, Kansas, United States. It is owned by the City of Wichita, and serves as the home ballpark of the Wichita Turbo Tubs of the Texas League, who played their first season at the stadium in 2021.

The facility has a total seating capacity of 10,025 people with 6,000 in fixed seating in addition to luxury suites and a grass berm in right field. When not used for baseball, the city plans to use the facility for sports festivals, high school football, concerts, and an ice rink in winter. The ballpark shares hosting the National Baseball Congress World Series (NBC World Series) with Eck Stadium at Wichita State.

== History ==
=== Previous stadiums ===
In 1912, Island Park baseball stadium was built on what was then Ackerman Island in the middle of the Arkansas River between the Douglas Street bridge and current 1st Street bridge. Baseball was played there from 1912 to 1933, when the stadium was torn down so the island could be removed to widen the river into one channel.

In 1934, Lawrence Stadium was built on the site of the current stadium as a Works Progress Administration (WPA) project during the Great Depression. In 1978, it was renamed to Lawrence–Dumont Stadium. In November 2018, the stadium was demolished to make room for the new Riverfront Stadium. The National Baseball Congress World Series was played entirely at Lawrence–Dumont Stadium from 1935 until 2018.

=== Current stadium ===
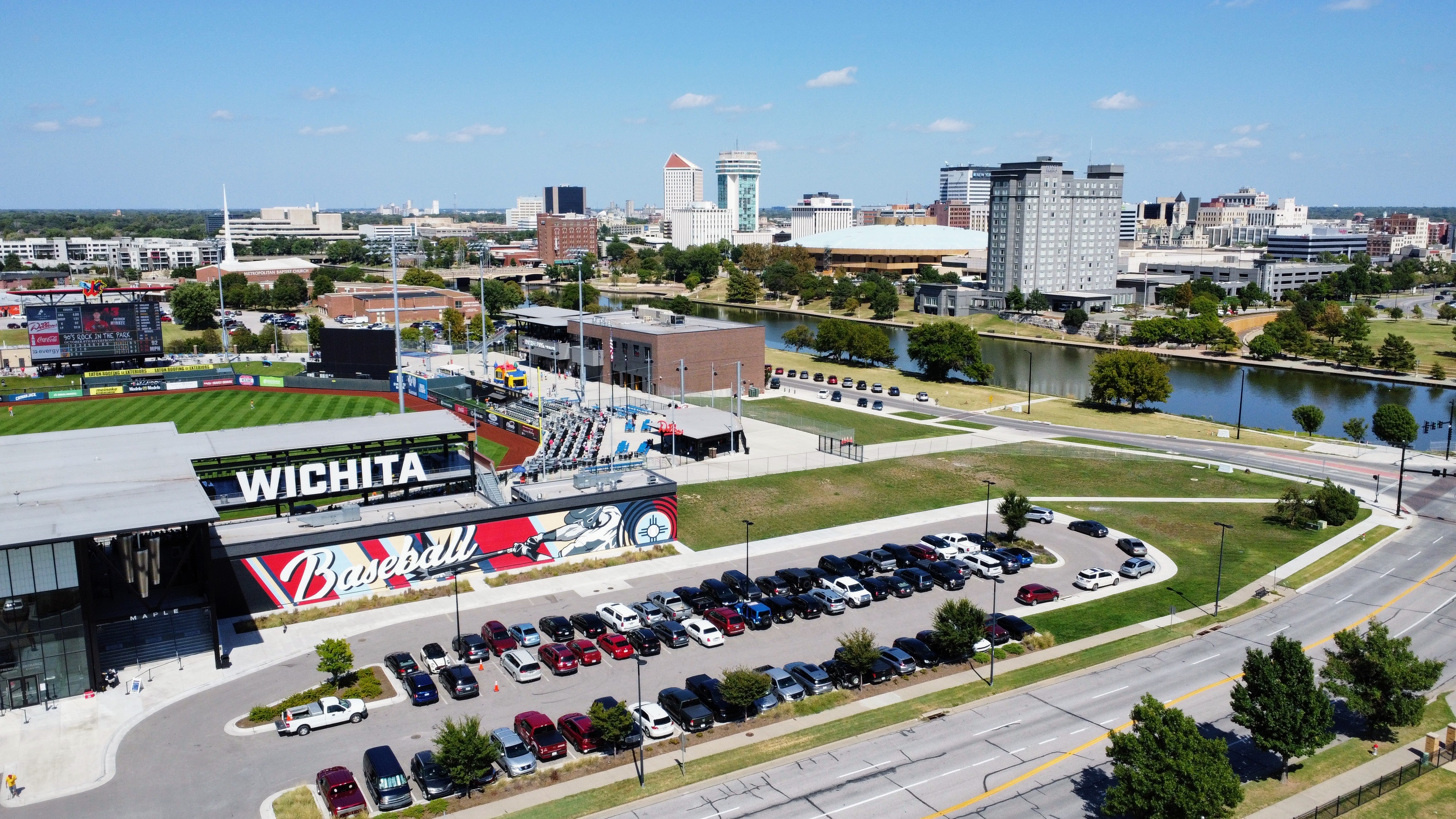
Downton Wichita skyline across the Arkansas River, looking northeast (2023)

Riverfront Stadium was built on the site of the former Lawrence–Dumont Stadium. Ground was broken for the ballpark in February 2019. A topping out ceremony, marking the placement of the last steel beam, was held on August 7, 2019. The stadium name was announced on March 6, 2020.

The ballpark was built to host the Wichita Wind Surge, a relocated Triple-A Pacific Coast League franchise that served as the top farm club for the major league Miami Marlins. However, a combination of the cancellation of the 2020 season due to the COVID-19 pandemic and Major League Baseball's realignment of the minor leagues for 2021, resulted in the team dropping down to the Double-A Texas League without playing a Triple-A game. After demotion to Double-A baseball, the team became affiliated with the Minnesota Twins. The Wind Surge rebranded as the Wichita Turbo Tubs after the 2026 season.

On April 10, 2021, the Wichita State Shockers baseball team hosted the University of Houston in the first baseball game played at Riverfront Stadium.

On January 21, 2025, the stadium was renamed to Equity Bank Park after locally based Equity Bank bought the naming rights, which will last until 2039.
