= Robert Moore (baseball) =

American baseball player (born 2002)

Philadelphia Phillies
- Second baseman
- Born: March 31, 2002 (age 24); Leawood, Kansas, U.S.
- Bats: Switch Throws: Right

Robert Moore (born March 31, 2002) is an American professional baseball second baseman in the Philadelphia Phillies organization.

== Amateur career ==
Moore attended Shawnee Mission East High School in Prairie Village, Kansas. He played for USA Baseball twice as an amateur. As a sophomore at Shawnee Mission East, he batted .392. In July 2019, he participated in the Under Armour All-America Baseball Game at Wrigley Field. He graduated from high school early in December 2019 so he could enroll at the University of Arkansas to play college baseball.

As a freshman at Arkansas in 2020, Moore started all 16 of Arkansas' games in which he batted .317 with two home runs and 17 RBI before the season was cancelled due to the COVID-19 pandemic. That summer, he played in the Northwoods League for the Rochester Honkers. He earned postseason All-Star honors after batting .303 with twenty stolen bases and 22 walks over 119 at-bats. In 2021, Moore returned as the starting second baseman for the Razorbacks. On March 30, he became the first Razorback since 1994 to hit for the cycle in a 21-8 win over Central Arkansas University. Over 61 games for the season, he slashed .283/.408/.558 with 16 home runs and 53 RBI. His 16 home runs were most on the team. He was named to the USA Baseball National Collegiate Team that summer. Moore entered the 2022 season as a top prospect for the upcoming draft. His draft stock fell after he ended the season batting .233 with eight home runs and 44 RBI over 63 games. He was awarded an ABCA/Rawlings Gold Glove.

== Professional career ==
=== Milwaukee Brewers ===
The Milwaukee Brewers drafted Moore with the 72nd overall selection of the 2022 Major League Baseball draft. He signed with the team for $800,000.

Moore made his professional debut with the rookie-level Arizona Complex League Brewers and was promoted to the Single-A Carolina Mudcats after four games. Over 31 games, he batted .248 with three home runs, 16 RBI, and seven stolen bases. Moore spent the 2023 season with the High-A Wisconsin Timber Rattlers. Over 123 games, he hit .233 with eight home runs, 62 RBI, 33 doubles, and 26 stolen bases.

=== Philadelphia Phillies ===
On November 14, 2023, Moore was traded to the Philadelphia Phillies (along with Hendry Méndez) in exchange for Oliver Dunn. He played the 2024 season with the Double-A Reading Fightin Phils, batting .240 with nine home runs, 41 RBI, and 19 stolen bases over 107 games. Moore returned to Reading to open the 2025 season and also played briefly with the Triple-A Lehigh Valley IronPigs. Over 89 games between both teams, Moore hit .201 with six home run, 35 RBI, and five stolen bases. He played the 2026 season with Lehigh Valley and batted .226 with 15 home runs and 47 RBI.

== Personal life ==
Moore is a Christian. Moore's father, Dayton Moore, was the Kansas City Royals General Manager from 2006 to 2021 and President in 2022.
