= Oliver Dunn =

American baseball player (born 1997)

Free agent
- Infielder
- Born: September 2, 1997 (age 29); Salt Lake City, Utah, U.S.
- Bats: Left Throws: Right

MLB debut
- March 30, 2024, for the Milwaukee Brewers

MLB statistics (through 2026 season)
- Batting average: .197
- Home runs: 1
- Runs batted in: 14
- Stats at Baseball Reference

Teams
- Milwaukee Brewers (2024–2025); Tampa Bay Rays (2026)

Oliver Harris Dunn (born September 2, 1997) is an American professional baseball infielder who is a free agent. He has previously played in Major League Baseball (MLB) for the Milwaukee Brewers and Tampa Bay Rays.

== Career ==
=== Amateur career ===
Dunn attended Cottonwood High School in Murray, Utah, and the University of Utah, where he played college baseball for the Utah Utes. In 2018, he played collegiate summer baseball with the Wareham Gatemen of the Cape Cod Baseball League.

=== New York Yankees ===
The New York Yankees selected Dunn in the 11th round, with the 345th overall selection, of the 2019 Major League Baseball draft. He split his first professional season between the rookie–level Pulaski Yankees and Single–A Charleston RiverDogs. Dunn did not play in a game in 2020 due to the cancellation of the minor league season because of the COVID-19 pandemic.

Dunn returned to action in 2021 with the High–A Hudson Valley Renegades and Double–A Somerset Patriots. In 72 games split between the two affiliates, he batted .196/.335/.368 with seven home runs, 25 RBI, and 10 stolen bases. Dunn played in 36 games split between Somerset and the Triple–A Scranton/Wilkes-Barre RailRiders in 2022, slashing .288/.406/.525 with three home runs and 18 RBI.

=== Philadelphia Phillies ===
On December 7, 2022, the Philadelphia Phillies selected Dunn in the minor league phase of the Rule 5 draft. He spent the 2023 campaign with the Double–A Reading Fightin Phils, batting .271/.396/.506 with career–highs in home runs (21), RBI (78), and stolen bases (16). Dunn played in the Arizona Fall League after the 2023 season.

=== Milwaukee Brewers ===
On November 14, 2023, the Phillies traded Dunn to the Milwaukee Brewers in exchange for Hendry Méndez and Robert Moore. The Brewers subsequently added Dunn to their 40-man roster to protect him from the Rule 5 draft.

Dunn was optioned to the Triple–A Nashville Sounds to begin the 2024 season. However, following an injury to Garrett Mitchell, Dunn was recalled to the Opening Day roster. In 41 games for Milwaukee, he batted .221/.282/.316 with one home run, seven RBI, and three stolen bases. Dunn was placed on the injured list with a back strain on June 27, and transferred to the 60–day injured list on July 15.

Dunn competed for playing time at third base for the Brewers in 2025. After batting .167 in his first 41 plate appearances of the 2025 season, the Brewers optioned Dunn to Nashville. Dunn was designated for assignment by the Brewers on August 30. He cleared waivers and was sent outright to Triple-A Nashville on September 1. Dunn elected free agency following the season on November 6.

=== Chicago White Sox ===
On December 14, 2025, Dunn signed a minor league contract with the Chicago White Sox. Dunn made 41 appearances for the Triple-A Charlotte Knights in 2026, slashing .295/.393/.545 with nine home runs, 34 RBI, and nine stolen bases.

=== Tampa Bay Rays ===
On May 19, 2026, Dunn was traded to the Tampa Bay Rays in exchange for Joe Rock. The following day, Tampa Bay selected Dunn's contract, adding him to their active roster. He made nine appearances for the team, going 1–for–11 (.091) with one RBI and one walk. Dunn was designated for assignment by the Rays on September 5. He cleared waivers and was sent outright to the Triple–A Durham Bulls on September 8. He elected free agency on October 29.

== See also ==
- Rule 5 draft results
