= Guillermo Quiróz =

Venezuelan baseball player (born 1981)

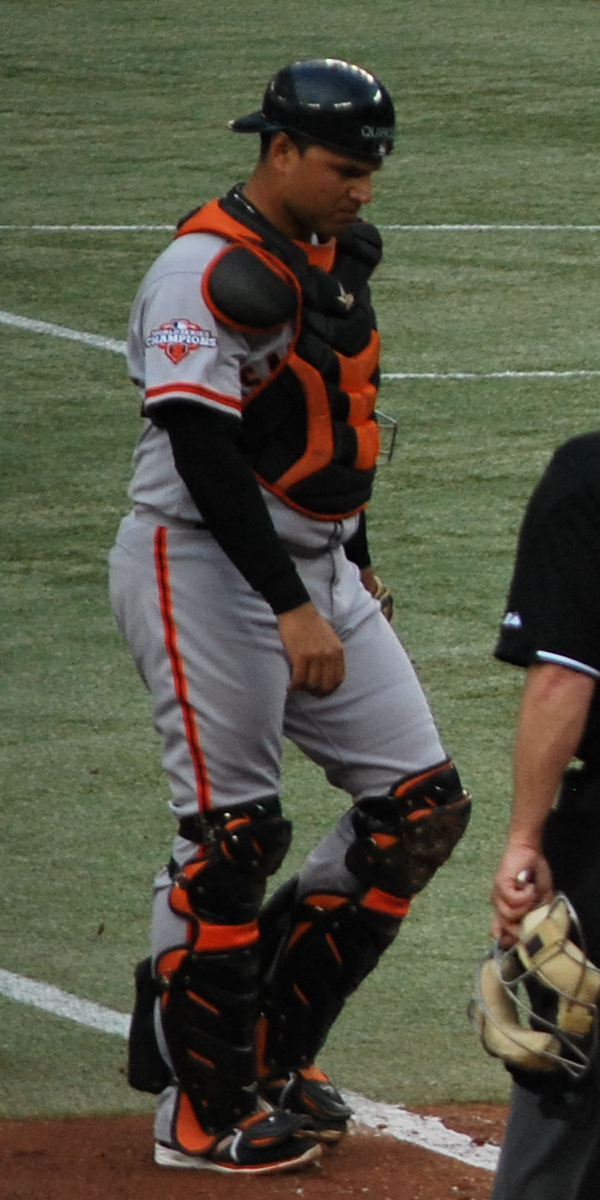
- Quiroz with the San Francisco Giants
- Catcher / Coach
- Born: November 29, 1981 (age 44); Maracaibo, Venezuela
- Batted: Right Threw: Right

MLB debut
- September 4, 2004, for the Toronto Blue Jays

Last MLB appearance
- September 13, 2014, for the San Francisco Giants

MLB statistics
- Batting average: .199
- Home runs: 3
- Runs batted in: 34
- Stats at Baseball Reference

Teams
- Toronto Blue Jays (2004–2005); Seattle Mariners (2006); Texas Rangers (2007); Baltimore Orioles (2008); Seattle Mariners (2009–2010); Boston Red Sox (2012); San Francisco Giants (2013–2014)

Guillermo Antonio Quiróz (Spanish pronunciation: [ɡiˈʝeɾmo kiˈɾos]; born November 29, 1981) is a Venezuelan former professional baseball catcher and current manager of the Winston-Salem Dash, the High-A affiliate of the Chicago White Sox. He played in Major League Baseball (MLB) for the Toronto Blue Jays, Seattle Mariners, Texas Rangers, Baltimore Orioles, Boston Red Sox, and San Francisco Giants.

== Amateur career ==
Quiróz was born in Maracaibo, Venezuela on November 29, 1981. He played Little League Baseball for Cocquivacoa, and was teammates with Yusmeiro Petit. In 1994, Cocquivacoa won Venezuela's first Little League World Series title. Then aged 10, Quiróz started every game that season as a catcher. Two year later, Quiróz won the Senior League World Series.

== Professional career ==
=== Toronto Blue Jays ===
Quiróz was signed by the Toronto Blue Jays as a non-drafted free agent in 1998, before his 17th birthday, with a $1 million signing bonus. He progressed through Toronto's system as the team's number-one catching prospect. In addition, Baseball America rated him as the Blue Jays' third best prospect in their 2004 pre-season rankings, and the 35th best prospect in all of baseball.

Defensively, Quiróz has good skills. In 2003, he threw out 45% of base stealers, and was the starting catcher for the World Team in the 2003 All-Star Futures Game.

He missed the end of the 2003 season with a collapsed lung. The broken hand and torn arm muscle he suffered in 2004 hurt his chances of taking over as the Blue Jays' starting catcher in 2005. Gregg Zaun and Greg Myers were re-signed to give Quiróz more time in the minors. However, Quiróz was set further back that season, due to shoulder strain and another collapsed lung.

In 2006, the Blue Jays signed catcher Jason Phillips initially as the backup to Gregg Zaun. They later signed Bengie Molina to be their new starter. This placed three catchers ahead of Quiróz on the Blue Jays' depth chart.

=== Seattle Mariners ===
On March 31, 2006, Quiróz was put on waivers by the Blue Jays, but was picked up by the Seattle Mariners on the same day. Quiróz started the seventh game of the 2006 season for the Mariners, but was outrighted to Triple-A Tacoma Rainiers eight days later. Quiróz spent the rest of the season between Triple-A Tacoma and the Double-A San Antonio Missions.

=== Texas Rangers ===
Quiróz was signed by the Texas Rangers on December 28, 2006. He spent most of the 2007 season with the Triple-A Oklahoma RedHawks until a September call-up to the majors. At the end of the 2007 season, the Rangers outrighted Quiróz to the minors, but he refused the assignment and became a free agent.

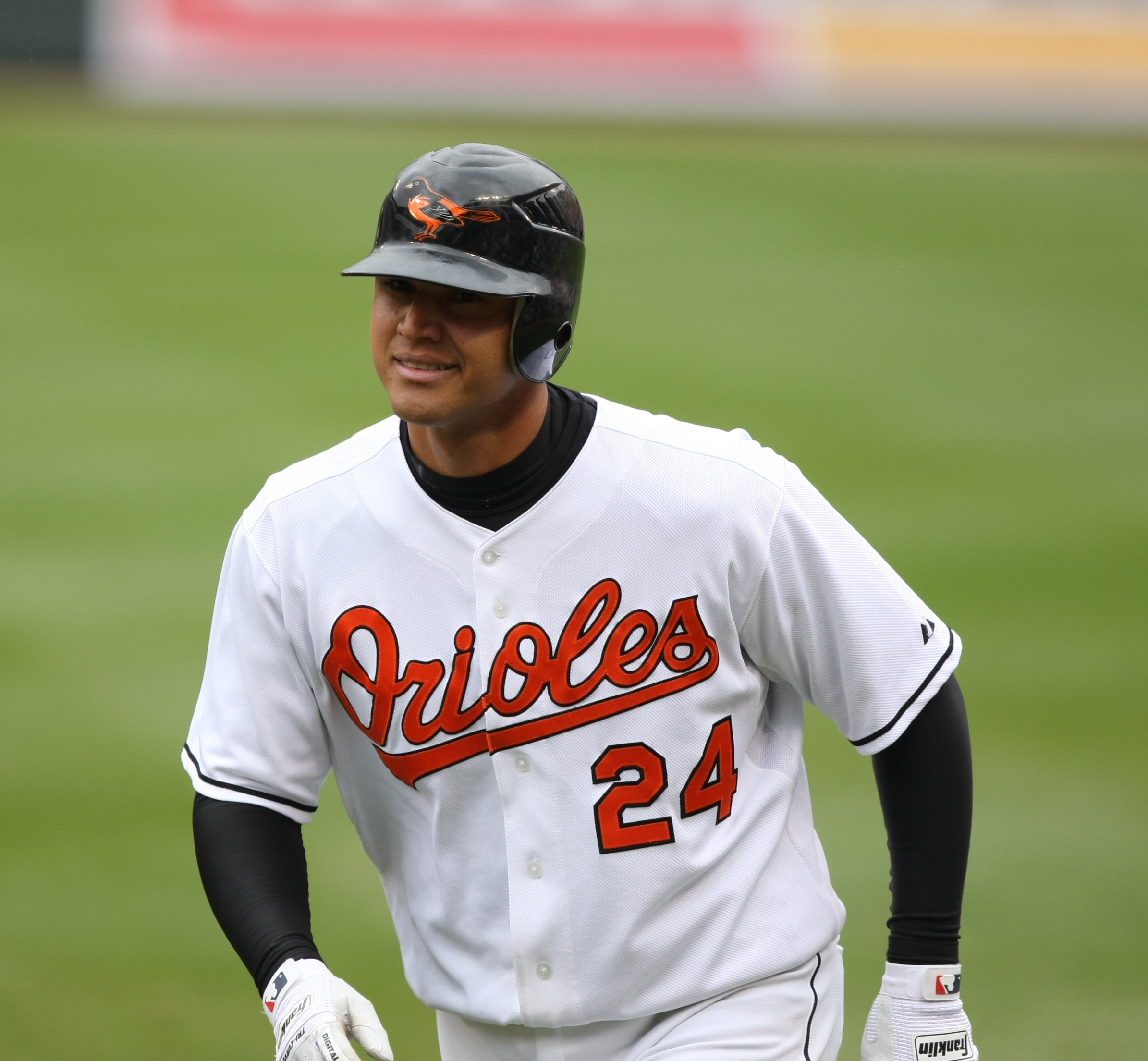
Quiróz playing for the Baltimore Orioles in 2008

=== Baltimore Orioles ===
On December 3, 2007, Quiróz signed a one-year major league contract with the Baltimore Orioles. He spent the 2008 season as the backup to catcher Ramón Hernández. He was invited to spring training and expected to compete for the backup catcher position at the start of the 2009 season, but was released on March 21.

=== Seattle Mariners (second stint) ===
On April 27, 2009, Quiróz signed a minor league contract with the Seattle Mariners. On May 14, he was assigned to the Double-A West Tenn Diamond Jaxx from the Triple-A Tacoma Rainiers. On May 26, Quiroz was called up from West Tenn to the Seattle Mariners. On June 19, Quiróz was designated for assignment by the Mariners.

Quiroz was later re-signed to a minor league contract on February 9, 2010. Quiróz refused an assignment to the Rainiers at the end of the season and became a free agent on November 3.

=== San Diego Padres ===
On January 5, 2011, Quiróz signed a minor league deal with the San Diego Padres. He was invited to spring training to be the backup to Nick Hundley, but did not win the job and spent the season playing for the Tucson Padres.

=== Seattle Mariners (third stint) ===
On December 14, 2011, Quiróz signed a minor league contract with the Seattle Mariners. He received an invitation to spring training, but did not play for the Mariners in 2012. Instead he played for their Triple-A affiliate Tacoma Rainiers.

=== Boston Red Sox ===
On September 4, 2012, the Mariners traded Quiróz to the Boston Red Sox for cash considerations. Quiróz was designated for assignment on October 4. According to the International League transactions page, Quiróz was outrighted to the Pawtucket Red Sox on October 10, but chose to become a free agent.

=== San Francisco Giants ===
On November 20, 2012, He signed a minor league contract with the San Francisco Giants that included an invitation to spring training. On May 4, 2013, Quiróz hit his first career walk-off home run, a tenth inning, pinch-hit homer against former battery mate Brandon League of the Los Angeles Dodgers, leading the Giants to a 10–9 victory. He was designated for assignment on August 8. Quiroz cleared waivers and was sent outright to the Triple-A Fresno Grizzlies on August 11.

On November 15, 2013, Quiróz signed a minor league contract to return to the Giants. He was assigned to Triple-A Fresno to begin the 2014 campaign. On August 31, 2014, the Giants selected Quiróz's contract, adding him to their active roster. On November 3, Quiróz was removed from the 40-man roster and sent outright to Triple-A. He refused the assignment and subsequently elected free agency.

On November 20, 2014, Quiróz re-signed with the Giants organization on another minor league contract. He made 27 appearances for the Triple-A Sacramento River Cats, batting .247/.303/.292 with 11 RBI and seven walks. Quiróz was released by San Francisco on July 15, 2015.

=== Cleveland Indians ===
On February 12, 2016, Quiróz signed a minor league contract with the Cleveland Indians that included an invitation to spring training. In 75 games for the Triple–A Columbus Clippers, he batted .264/.314/.447 with 11 home runs and 38 RBI. Quiróz elected free agency following the season on November 7.

Quiróz re–signed with Cleveland on another minor league contract on November 21, 2016. He was released on March 31, 2017.

== Coaching career ==
Quiróz was named a coach for the Triple-A Charlotte Knights for the 2019 season. In January 2020, he was named manager of the Kannapolis Cannon Ballers, the Single-A affiliate of the Chicago White Sox.

Quiróz was named manager of the High-A affiliate, Winston-Salem Dash, for the 2023 season. On January 18, 2025, Quiróz was announced as the manager of the Birmingham Barons, Chicago's Double-A affiliate. On January 22, 2026, Quiróz was announced as Winston-Salem's new manager.

On May 29, 2026, Quiróz was announced as manager of the Águilas del Zulia for the 2026–27 Venezuelan Professional Baseball League season, replacing Lipso Nava.

== See also ==
- List of Major League Baseball players from Venezuela
