= Wichita Turbo Tubs =

- Founded in 2020; Wichita, Kansas
Team logo
Cap insignia

Minor league affiliations
- Class: Double-A (2021–present)
- Previous classes: Triple-A (2020)
- League: Texas League (2021–present)
- Division: North Division
- Previous leagues: Pacific Coast League (2020)

Major league affiliations
- Team: Minnesota Twins (2021–present)
- Previous teams: Miami Marlins (2020)

Minor league titles
- League titles (0): None
- Division titles (2): 2021; 2022
- Second-half titles (1): 2022

Team data
- Name: Wichita Turbo Tubs (2027–present)
- Previous names: Wichita Wind Surge (2020–2026)
- Colors: Turquoise, purple, orange
- Ballpark: Equity Bank Park
- Owner/ Operator: Diamond Baseball Holdings
- General manager: Matt Hamilton
- Manager: Nico Giarratano
- Website: mlb.com/milb/wichita

The Wichita Turbo Tubs are a Minor League Baseball team of the Texas League and the Double-A affiliate of the Minnesota Twins. They are located in Wichita, Kansas, and began play in 2021 at Equity Bank Park.

The team was founded in 2020 as the Wichita Wind Surge, and was planned to serve as the Triple-A affiliate of the Miami Marlins in the Pacific Coast League. However, a combination of the cancellation of the 2020 season due to the COVID-19 pandemic and Major League Baseball's realignment of the minor leagues for 2021, resulted in the team dropping down to Double-A as affiliates of the Twins without having played a Triple-A game. They rebranded as the Turbo Tubs after the 2026 season.

== History ==
Prior to 2020, the team was located in Metairie, Louisiana, where it had played for 24 seasons as the New Orleans Zephyrs before being renamed the Baby Cakes for three seasons. In 1993, the Denver Zephyrs had been forced to move due to the creation of the Colorado Rockies expansion franchise in Major League Baseball. Before 1984, they played for nearly 30 years as the Denver Bears.

In September 2018, the city of Wichita paid US$2.2 million to the Wichita Wingnuts to break their lease at Lawrence–Dumont Stadium, with plans to demolish it and build a larger ballpark to host an affiliated Minor League Baseball team. The city later announced that a new $75 million stadium would be built to host the Triple-A New Orleans Baby Cakes, who agreed to relocate to Wichita beginning with the 2020 season.

The club announced its nickname, Wind Surge, in November 2019. The name was met with criticism from Wichita residents following the announcement. Later in the day the name was announced, a Change.org petition was started to change the name. In less than 24 hours, the petition had already collected over 7,400 signatures.

Prior to the COVID-19 pandemic, the Wind Surge were scheduled to begin their inaugural season on the road playing against the Round Rock Express on April 8, 2020, and to play their first home game on April 14 against the Memphis Redbirds. Initially postponed due to the pandemic, the season was ultimately cancelled on June 30. Owner Lou Schwechheimer died from complications from COVID on July 29, 2020.

In 2021, the team dropped to the Double-A classification without having played a Triple-A game due to Major League Baseball's realignment of the minor leagues after the 2020 season. Instead of being a Miami Marlins affiliate, the Wind Surge became affiliated with the Minnesota Twins. They were placed in the Double-A Central. Wichita began competition in the new league on May 4 with a 2–0 victory over the Springfield Cardinals at Hammons Field in Springfield, Missouri. The Wind Surge won the Northern Division title by finishing the 2021 season in first place with a 69–51 record. They qualified for the championship playoffs by possessing the league's best record. In the best-of-five series, they were defeated by the second-place Northwest Arkansas Naturals, 3–2. Wichita manager Ramon Borrego was selected as the league's Manager of the Year. In 2022, the Double-A Central became known as the Texas League, the name historically used by the regional circuit prior to the 2021 reorganization. In January 2025 Brian Dinkelman was named manager.

In June 2026, the team announced they would rebrand as the Wichita Turbo Tubs, a name introduced as an alternate identity in 2022, starting in 2027.

== Roster ==
Wichita Turbo Tubs roster
Players	Coaches/Other
Pitchers: 33 Sam Armstrong; 44 Spencer Bengard; 35 Kyle Bischoff; 16 Adrian Bohorquez; 24 Darren Bowen; 8 Hunter Gregory; 45 Preston Johnson; 38 Ty Langenberg; 43 Cory Lewis; 46 Mitch Mueller; 23 Jaylen Nowlin; 16 Jose Olivares; 39 Riley Quick; 51 Luis Quiñones; 18 Yehizon Sanchez; 41 Chris Vallimont; Catchers: 31 Andrew Cossetti; 13 Khadim Diaw; 19 Luis Hernandez; 26 Poncho Ruiz; Infielders: 11 Danny De Andrade; 9 Kyle DeBarge; 15 Marek Houston; 2 Quinn McDaniel; 25 Jay Thomason; Outfielders: 22 Graham Brown; 20 Jaime Ferrer; 21 Caden Kendle; 1 Garrett Spain; 17 Brandon Winokur	Manager: 32 Nico Giarratano; Coaches: 55 Andrew Cresci (hitting); 0 Julian Gonzalez (development); 47 Stephen Ridings (pitching); 27 Jesus Sanchez (pitching); 60-day injured list: -- Hunter Hoopes; 17 Eli Jones; 22 Caleb Roberts; 7-day injured list; * On Minnesota Twins 40-man roster; ~ Development list; # Rehab assignment; ∞ Reserve list; ‡ Restricted list; § Suspended list; † Temporarily inactive list; Roster updated September 21, 2026; Transactions; → More rosters: MiLB • Texas League; → Minnesota Twins minor league players
