= Riley Quick =

American baseball player (born 2004)

Minnesota Twins
- Pitcher
- Born: April 29, 2004 (age 22); Trussville, Alabama, U.S.
- Bats: Right Throws: Right

Riley Wayne Quick (born April 29, 2004) is an American professional baseball pitcher in the Minnesota Twins organization.

== Amateur career ==
Quick attended Hewitt-Trussville High School in Trussville, Alabama, where he played football and baseball. He was rated a four-star prospect as an offensive lineman and declined offers from Auburn University and Mississippi State University to play football. As a senior in 2022, Quick had a 13–1 record with a 0.92 ERA and 130 strikeouts over 83 2/3 innings and was named Alabama Mr. Baseball. After graduating, he enrolled at the University of Alabama to play college baseball.

As a freshman at Alabama in 2023, Quick made 16 relief appearances and went 1–1 with a 3.68 ERA. In 2024, he started and pitched three innings in his season debut before undergoing season-ending Tommy John surgery. Quick returned to play in 2025 and began the season in Alabama's starting rotation on an innings limit. Over 14 starts, he went 8–3 with a 3.92 ERA and seventy strikeouts over 62 innings.

== Professional career ==
Quick was selected by the Minnesota Twins with the 36th overall pick in the 2025 Major League Baseball draft. He signed with Minnesota for a $2.69 million bonus on July 24, 2025.

Quick made his professional debut in 2026 with the Single-A Fort Myers Mighty Mussels. He made three starts and allowed one hit, no runs, and struck out 13 batters across eight innings before being promoted to the High-A Cedar Rapids Kernels. Quick started 11 games for Cedar Rapids, pitching to a 0–2 record, a 4.14 ERA and 61 strikeouts across 41 1/3 innings and was then promoted to the Double-A Wichita Wind Surge in July. Over nine starts with Wichita, he went 0–3 with a 6.68 ERA and 36 strikeouts over 32 1/3 innings.
