= Baseball, Minnesota =

American television documentary series

Baseball, Minnesota is a television documentary series that premiered on the FX Network. The show followed a minor league baseball team, the St. Paul Saints, through the 1996 season. Until the FX network's format change in 1997, this was the only television series that was neither live nor a rebroadcast of a syndicated series. The 22 episode series premiered in August 1996.

The soundtrack (including the theme song "Famous") was performed by rock group Ted's Lunch.
