= Lipso Nava =

Venezuelan baseball player and coach (born 1968)

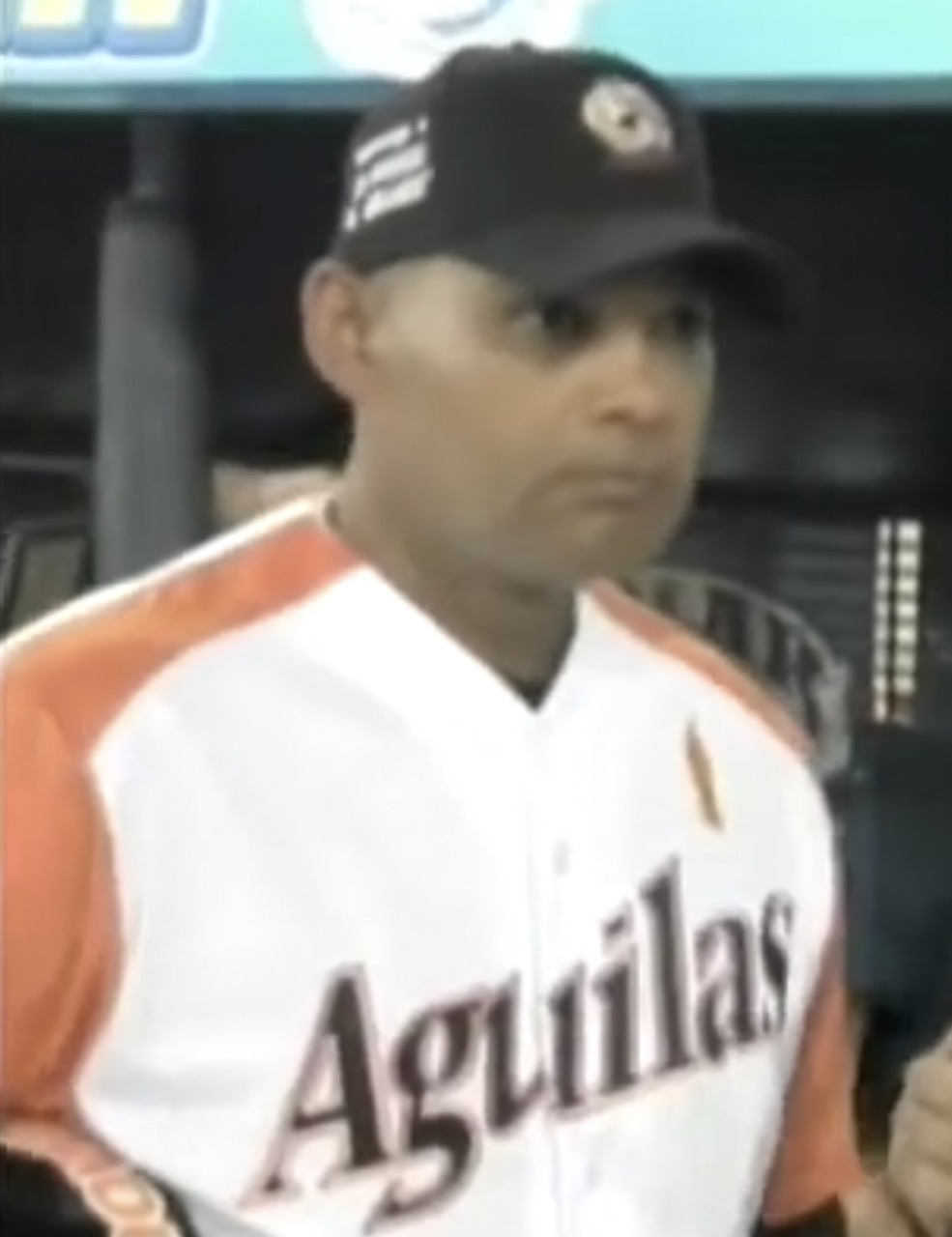
- Nava with the Águilas del Zulia in 2012
- Coach
- Born: November 28, 1968 (age 57); Maracaibo, Zulia, Venezuela
- Bats: Right Throws: Right

CPBL statistics
- Batting average: .167
- Hits: 1
- Home runs: 0
- Stats at Baseball Reference

Teams
- Macoto Cobras (2004)

Lipso Nava (born November 28, 1968) is a Venezuelan professional baseball coach who is the current manager of the Leones del Caracas of the Venezuelan Professional Baseball League. He is also a longtime coach in the San Francisco Giants organization. In his native Venezuela, he has twice received manager of the year honors, both times with the Águilas del Zulia. Nava played in the minor leagues, the Mexican Baseball League, and the Chinese Professional Baseball League.

== Playing career ==
Nava was drafted as a shortstop out of Miami Dade College by the Seattle Mariners in the 14th round of the 1990 Major League Baseball draft. Nava made his pro debut with the Bellingham Mariners of the Northwest League before promoted to the High-A Carolina League (1991–1992) and the Double-A Southern League (1993–1994). He was released by the Mariners and signed by the Boston Red Sox in the 1995 offseason, spending time at Double-A Trenton and High-A Sarasota. He finished his time in affiliated baseball in the Chicago Cubs organization, reaching Triple-A with the Iowa Cubs in 1997.

Nava played in the independent Atlantic League from 1998 to 2006, with the Somerset Patriots, Camden Riversharks, and Newark Bears. He also played in the Mexican Baseball League with the Langosteros de Cancún (1998), Rojos del Águila de Veracruz (2001), and the Algodoneros de Unión Laguna (2001). In Taiwan, he made two appearances with the Macoto Cobras of the Chinese Professional Baseball League.

In Venezuela, Nava played 12 winter league seasons with the Águilas del Zulia. He posted a .276 batting average with the team, with 13 home runs and 157 runs batted in; he was also part of the team that won the championship in the 1999-2000 season.

== Coaching career ==
Nava managed the Augusta GreenJackets in the 2011 and 2012 seasons. He was appointed acting manager of the San Jose Giants in 2015, leading the club to a North Division title and a beth in the California League finals. He managed the San Jose in the full seasons of 2016, 2018, and 2022. In 2022, Baseball America named Nava the best managerial prospect in the California League. Since 2023, he has served as fundamentals coach for the Richmond Flying Squirrels.

Nava first managed in the LVBP with Zulia in the 2011–12 season, taking over after the firing of Mako Oliveras; he led the team to a berth in the playoff round robin with a record of 28 wins and 17 losses. He returned to helm Zulia in the 2016–17 season. He led the team to the LVBP title after a 33-30 regular season, defeating the Cardenales de Lara in the final, and won Manager of the Year honors. He became the first member of the Águilas franchise to win a championship with the club as both a player and a manager. Nava also managed Zulia at the 2017 Caribbean Series, losing to Criollos de Caguas in the semifinals. In the 2017–18 season, he again led the team to the postseason, where they were eliminated in the first round by the Cardenales de Lara. Partway through the 2018–19 season, Nava was fired by the Águilas on December 7, 2018, after posting 18-25 record.

Nava was set to serve as bench coach for the Navegantes del Magallanes for the 2019–20 winter league season, but was unable to do so after MLB barred its players and other affiliates from playing in the LVBP in 2019. He instead skippered the Caimanes de Barranquilla in the Colombian league; Caimanes were knocked out in the semifinals. Nava spoke positively of the quality of play in Colombia, but was critical of the league and the team's management for supposed oversights.

He returned to Águilas for the 2024–25 season. Nava again won a manager of the year award following the season, after leading the Zulia to a 30-26 record in the regular season, securing the team's first playoff round robin appearance in five years.

Nava served as third base coach for the Italy national baseball team at the 2026 World Baseball Classic.

On May 7, 2026, Nava was named manager of the Leones del Caracas for the 2026–27 LVBP season.

== Personal life ==
During the 2002–2003 unrest in Venezuela, Nava was robbed at gunpoint and nearly kidnapped outside his home in Maracaibo. He blamed then-president Hugo Chávez for precipitating the unrest.
