= Marek Houston =

American baseball player (born 2004)

Minnesota Twins
- Shortstop
- Born: April 14, 2004 (age 22); College Station, Texas, U.S.
- Bats: Right Throws: Right
- Stats at Baseball Reference

Marek Christopher Houston (born April 14, 2004) is an American professional baseball shortstop in the Minnesota Twins organization. He was selected by the Twins in the first round of the 2025 Major League Baseball draft.

== Amateur career ==
Houston attended Venice High School in Venice, Florida. He committed to Wake Forest University to play college baseball.

As a freshman at Wake Forest in 2023, Houston played in 65 games with 59 starts and hit .220/.328/.307 with four home runs and 29 runs batted in (RBI) over 260 plate appearances. After the season, he played collegiate summer baseball in the Perfect Game Collegiate Baseball League for the Amsterdam Mohawks. As a sophomore in 2024, Houston started 53 of 54 games for Wake Forest and improved to .326/.434/.516 with eight home runs and 39 RBI over 264 plate appearances. After the season, he played for the Bourne Braves in the Cape Cod League. Houston entered his junior season in 2025 as a top prospect for the upcoming MLB draft. He batted .354/.458/.597 with 15 home runs, 66 RBI, and 19 stolen bases in 298 plate appearances.

== Professional career ==
The Minnesota Twins selected Houston with the 16th overall pick in the first round of the 2025 Major League Baseball draft. Houston signed with Minnesota for a $4.9 dollar signing bonus on July 23.

Houston made his professional debut with the Single-A Fort Myers Miracle and also played with the High-A Cedar Rapids Kernels, hitting .270 with one home run across 24 total games played. He was assigned to Cedar Rapids to open the 2026 season.

== Personal life ==
Houston's brother, Graham, also played at Venice High School. He is a top prospect for the 2027 Major League Baseball draft, played for the 2026 USA 18U national baseball team, and is committed to play baseball at LSU.
