= 1984 Caribbean Series =

Twenty-sixth edition of baseball tournament; held in San Juan, Puerto Rico

The twenty-sixth edition of the Caribbean Series (Serie del Caribe) was played in 1984. It was held from February 4 through February 9 with the champion teams from Dominican Republic (Tigres del Licey), Mexico (Cañeros de Los Mochis), Puerto Rico (Indios de Mayagüez) and Venezuela (Águilas del Zulia). The format consisted of 12 games, each team facing the other teams twice. The games were played at Hiram Bithorn Stadium in San Juan, Puerto Rico.

== Summary ==
Águilas del Zulia of the Venezuelan league won the series with a 5–1 record and was managed by Rubén Amaro. RF Leonel Carrión earned the Series MVP award, after hitting a .529 batting average (9-for-17) with five runs, four stolen bases and a .765 slugging percentage. Supporting him on Venezuela were 1B Tito Francona (.333, 5 RBI, .407 SLG), 3B Luis Salazar (.227 BA, .333 OBP, .571 SLG, three SB) and LF Jerry White (.308 BA, .462 SLG, five RBI). The pitching staff posted a collective .173 ERA and was led by Ron Meredith (1-0, 1.00 ERA, 7 strikeouts, 9 innings), Luis Leal (1-0, 3.00, 13 SO, 9 innings), Derek Botelho (1-0, .000 ERA, 7 innings) and Kelly Downs (1-0, one save, .311, 6 SO in 8 2/3 innings). Other significant members of the roster included pitchers Porfi Altamirano, Luis Sánchez and Manny Sarmiento; catcher Bobby Ramos; infielders Juan Bustabad, Johnny Paredes, Razor Shines and Manny Trillo, and outfielders Jeff Stone and César Tovar. The team's only defeat came on the final day of the competition, losing 5–4 to Mexico in 13 innings. Five Venezuelan players were included in the All-Star team.

The Mexican entry, led by Vinicio García, finished in second place with a 4-2 mark, and featured big leaguers as Fernando Arroyo (P), Francisco Estrada (C), Jim Lewis (P), Junior Moore (OF) and Aurelio Rodríguez (3B). The Mochis also ended second in batting average (.214) but committed 14 errors for a .945 fielding percentage, which was the worst total among all teams (Dominican Republic, Puerto Rico and Venezuela combined for 13 errors).

Dominican Republic tied with Puerto Rico for last place with a 1-4 record. They tied at 5 in the eighth inning of a game suspended by rain.

The Dominicans, piloted by Manny Mota, finished third in batting average (.208) and fielding percentage (.955). Pascual Pérez (1-0) got their only win, while the top hitter was OF George Bell, who belted the only three home runs of his team to lead the tourney. The Licey team also featured players Pedro Borbón (P), Dámaso García (2B), César Gerónimo (LF), Mark Huismann (P), Howard Johnson (3B), Rafael Landestoy (RF), Alejandro Peña (P), Floyd Rayford (1B), Gilberto Reyes (C), Rafael Santana (2B), Julio Solano (P) and José Uribe (SS).

Puerto Rico, managed by Frank Verdi, led the series in fielding percentage (.975) but finished last in batting average (.192). Pitcher Tom Candiotti won the only game for Mayagüez while first baseman Carmelo Martínez led the attack (2 HR, 5 RBI). Other members of the roster were Juan Agosto (P), Larry Anderson (P), Sid Bream (DH), José Guzmán (P), Dion James (LF), Tom Lawless (2B), Craig Lefferts (P), Ron LeFlore (RF), Candy Maldonado (CF), José Morales (DH), Luis Quiñones (3B) and Dickie Thon (SS).

Final standings
Club	W	L	W/L %	GB
Venezuela	5	1	.833	–
Mexico	4	2	.667	1.0
Dominican Republic	1	4	.200	3 1/2
Puerto Rico	1	4	.200	3 1/2

Individual leaders
Player/Club	Statistic
Leonel Carrión / VEN	Batting average	.529
George Bell / Dominican Republic	Home runs	3
George Bell / Dominican Republic	RBI	6
Leonel Carrión / VEN; Luis Salazar / VEN	Runs	6
Leonel Carrión / VEN	Hits	9
Terry Francona / VEN	Doubles	2
Three tied	Triples	1
Leonel Carrión / VEN	Stolen bases	4
Eleven tied	Wins	1
Luis Leal / VEN	Strikeouts	13
Ron Meredith / VEN	ERA	1.00
Carlos Granillo / MEX	Saves	2
Leonardo Valenzuela / MEX	Innings pitched	15 1/3
Awards
Terry Francona / VEN	Most Valuable Player
Rubén Amaro / VEN	Manager

All-Star Team
Name/Club	Position
Bobby Ramos / VEN	catcher
Terry Francona / VEN	first baseman
Juan Francisco Rodríguez / MEX	second baseman
Aurelio Rodríguez / MEX	third baseman
Juan Bustabad / VEN	shortstop
Jerry White / VEN	left fielder
George Bell / DOM	center fielder
Leonel Carrión / VEN	right fielder
Jim Collins / MEX	designated hitter
Tom Candiotti / PRI	RH pitcher
Ron Meredith / VEN	LH pitcher
Rubén Amaro / VEN	manager

== Scoreboards ==
=== Game 1, February 4 ===
Team	1	2	3	4	5	6	7	8	9	R	H	E
Venezuela	0	0	1	1	0	0	0	2	0	4	11	1
Dominican Republic	2	0	0	0	0	0	0	0	0	2	6	1
WP: Derek Botelho (1-0) LP: Andy Araujo (0-1) Sv: Kelly Downs (1); Home runs: VEN: Leonel Carrión (1); DOM: None

=== Game 2, February 4 ===
Team	1	2	3	4	5	6	7	8	9	R	H	E
Puerto Rico	0	0	0	0	0	0	0	1	0	1	6	1
Mexico	0	1	1	0	1	0	0	0	X	3	11	0
WP: Alfonso Pulido (1-0) LP: Jim Lewis (0-1) Sv: Carlos Granillo (1); Home runs: PRI: Carmelo Martínez (1); MEX: None

=== Game 3, February 5 ===
Team	1	2	3	4	5	6	7	8	9	R	H	E
Dominican Republic	1	0	0	0	0	0	0	0	0	1	5	0
Mexico	0	1	1	0	0	0	0	0	X	2	6	3
WP: Leonardo Valenzuela (1-0) LP: Julio Solano (0-1)

=== Game 4, February 5 ===
Team	1	2	3	4	5	6	7	8	9	R	H	E
Venezuela	0	0	3	0	0	0	1	0	0	4	8	1
Puerto Rico	0	0	1	0	0	0	0	0	2	3	5	1
WP: Luis Leal (1-0) LP: José Guzmán (0-1); Home runs: VEN: None; PRI: Angel Rodríguez (1)

=== Game 5, February 6 ===
Team	1	2	3	4	5	6	7	8	9	R	H	E
Mexico	1	0	0	0	0	0	0	0	0	1	4	0
Venezuela	0	0	1	0	0	0	2	1	X	4	8	0
WP: Ron Meredith (1-0) LP: Fernando Arroyo (0-1); Home runs: MEX: None; VEN: Luis Salazar (1)

=== Game 6, February 6 ===
Team	1	2	3	4	5	6	7	8	9	R	H	E
Puerto Rico	0	0	3	0	0	0	0	0	0	3	6	1
Dominican Republic	0	1	0	0	0	0	2	0	1	4	10	1
WP: Pascual Pérez (1-0) LP: Craig Lefferts (0-1)

=== Game 7, February 7 ===
Team	1	2	3	4	5	6	7	8	9	R	H	E
Dominican Republic	1	0	0	0	2	0	1	0	0	4	10	3
Venezuela	3	0	3	0	0	0	0	3	X	9	8	1
WP: Kelly Downs (1-0) LP: Alejandro Peña (0-1); Home runs: DOM: George Bell (1); VEN: Jerry White (1)

=== Game 8, February 7 ===
Team	1	2	3	4	5	6	7	8	9	R	H	E
Mexico	0	0	0	0	0	0	0	0	1	1	3	7
Puerto Rico	2	1	2	0	0	1	7	1	X	14	13	0
WP: Tom Candiotti (1-0) LP: Leonardo Valenzuela (1-1); Home runs: MEX: None; PRI: Carmelo Martínez (2), Luis Quiñones (1)

=== Game 9, February 8 ===
Team	1	2	3	4	5	6	7	8	9	R	H	E
Mexico	2	0	0	2	0	0	5	0	1	10	11	0
Dominican Republic	0	0	1	2	1	0	2	1	0	7	9	1
WP: Fernando Arroyo (1-1) LP: Mark Huismann (0-1) Sv: Carlos Granillo (2); Home runs: MEX: Junior Moore (1), Jim Collins (1); DOM: George Bell 2 (3)

=== Game 10, February 8 ===
Team	1	2	3	4	5	6	7	8	9	R	H	E
Puerto Rico	0	0	0	0	0	0	0	2	0	2	4	2
Venezuela	0	0	0	0	0	0	3	0	X	3	10	1
WP: Manuel Lunar (1-0) LP: Chuck Foster (0-1)

=== Game 11, February 9 ===
Team	1	2	3	4	5	6	7	8	9	10	11	12	13	R	H	E
Venezuela	0	0	0	0	0	1	0	0	2	0	1	0	0	4	9	3
Mexico	0	2	0	0	0	0	0	1	0	0	1	0	1	5	12	4
WP: Ray Velasquez (1-0) LP: José Alfaro (0-1); Home runs: VEN: Luis Salazar (2); MEX: None

=== Game 12, February 9 ===
Team	1	2	3	4	5	6	7	8	R	H	E
Dominican Republic	0	0	0	0	0	0	0	0	5	6	0
Puerto Rico	0	0	0	0	0	0	0	0	5	5	0

- Game was called after eight innings due to rain.

== See also ==
- Ballplayers who have played in the Series

== Sources ==
- Antero Núñez, José. Series del Caribe. Impresos Urbina, Caracas, Venezuela.
- Araujo Bojórquez, Alfonso. Series del Caribe: Narraciones y estadísticas, 1949-2001. Colegio de Bachilleres del Estado de Sinaloa, Mexico.
- Figueredo, Jorge S. Cuban Baseball: A Statistical History, 1878 - 1961. Macfarland & Co., United States.
- González Echevarría, Roberto. The Pride of Havana. Oxford University Express.
- Gutiérrez, Daniel. Enciclopedia del Béisbol en Venezuela, Caracas, Venezuela.
