= 2000–01 Venezuelan Professional Baseball League season =

There is a recap for the 2000–01 Venezuelan Professional Baseball League season (Spanish: Liga Venezolana de Béisbol Profesional or LVBP):

== Regular season standings ==
=== Eastern Division ===
Team	Wins	Losses	Pct	GB
(C)Navegantes de Magallanes	32	30	.516	–
(C)Tiburones de la Guaira	30	32	.484	2
Caribes de Oriente	26	35	.426	5.5
Leones del Caracas	26	36	.419	6

=== Western Division ===
Team	Wins	Losses	Pct	GB
(C)Cardenales de Lara	35	26	.574	–
(C)Aguilas del Zulia	34	28	.548	1.5
Pastora de los Llanos	31	32	.492	5
Tigres de Aragua	25	37	.403	10.5

(C)Classified to the Round Robin

=== Wild Card ===
Team	Wins	Losses	Pct	GB
(C)Pastora de los Llanos	31	32	.492	–
Tigres de Aragua	25	37	.403	1.5
Caribes de Oriente	26	35	.426	5.5
Leones del Caracas	26	36	.419	6

(C)Classified to the Round Robin

== Round robin ==
Team	Wins	Losses	Pct.	GB
(C)Navegantes del Magallanes	11	5	.688	–
(C)Cardenales de Lara	9	7	.563625	2
Aguilas del Zulia	8	8	.500	3
Pastora de los Llanos	7	9	.438	4
Tiburones de la Guaira	5	11	.313	6

(C)Classified to the Championship series.

== Championship series ==
Team	Wins	Losses	Pct.	GB
Cardenales de Lara	4	2	.667	–
Navegantes del Magallanes	2	4	.333	–

Cardenales de Lara LVBP 2000-2001 Champions

== Awards ==
Most Valuable Player (Víctor Davalillo Award): Chris Jones (La Guaira)

Overall Offensive Performer of the year: Chris Jones (La Guaira) and Alex Cabrera (Los Llanos)

Rookie of the year: Carlos Mendoza (La Guaira)

Comeback of the year: José Malavé (Oriente)

Pitcher of the year (Carrao Bracho Award): Edwin Hurtado (Lara)

Reliever of the year: José Solarte (Magallanes)
