= List of stadiums in South America =

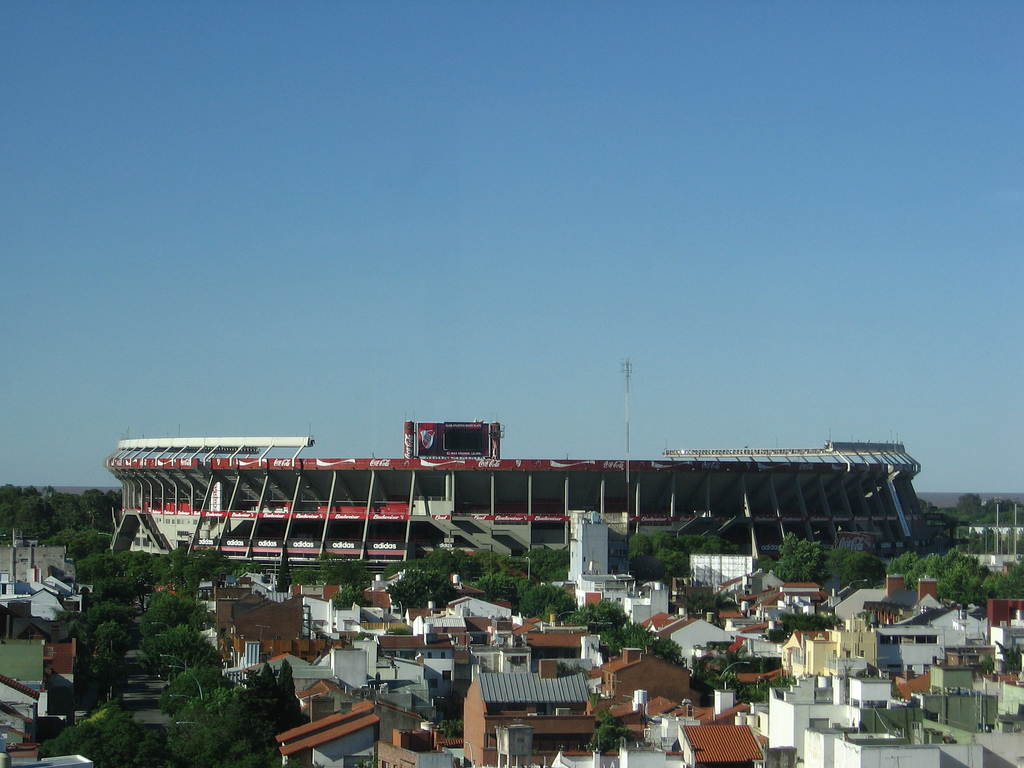
The 84,567-capacity Estadio Mâs Monumental, the home of River Plate.

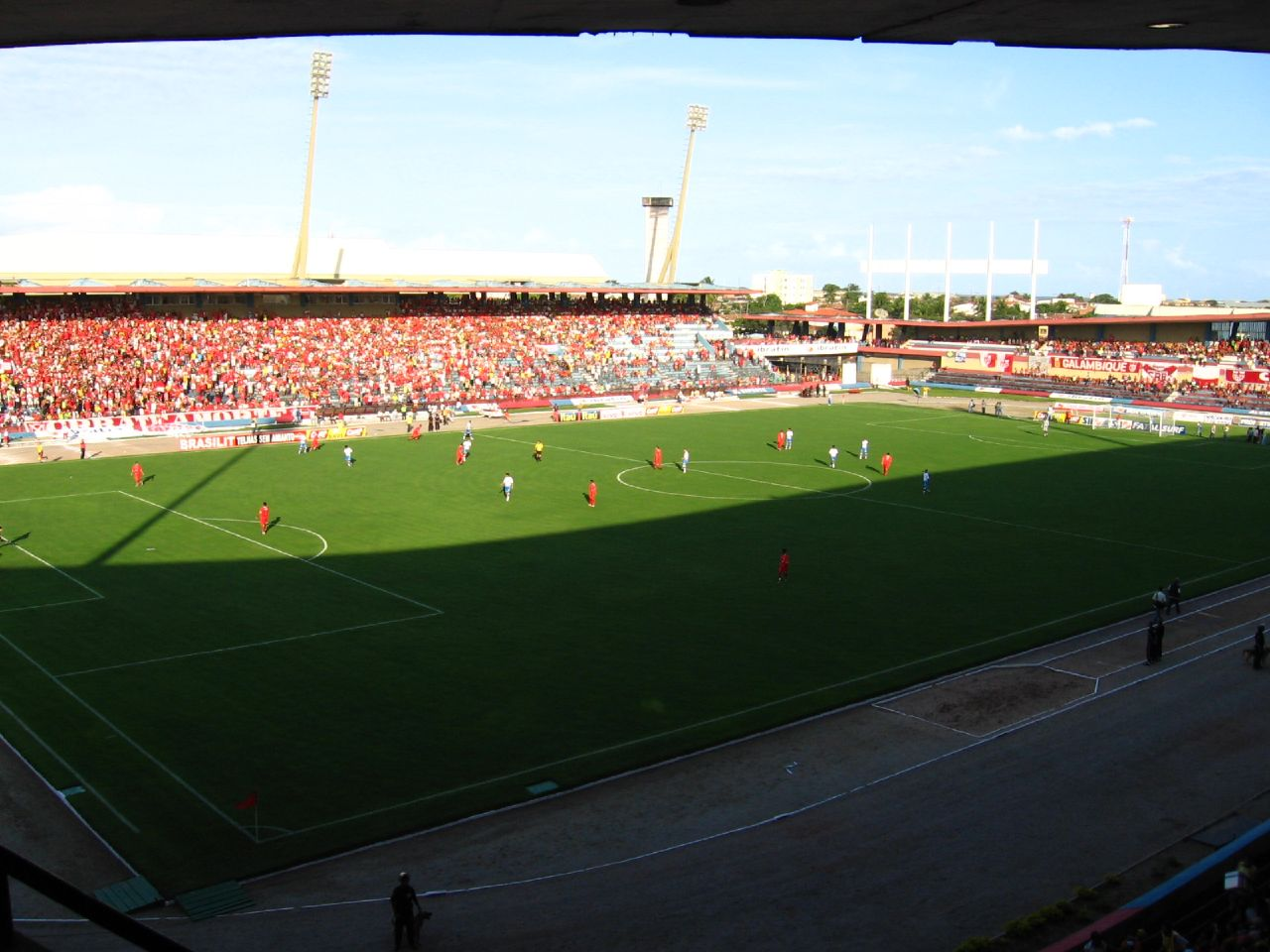
The 19,105-capacity Estádio Rei Pelé, the home of Centro Sportivo Alagoano and Clube de Regatas Brasil.

The following is a list of stadiums in South America.

== List ==
=== Argentina ===
- Buenos Aires Lawn Tennis Club – Buenos Aires
- Estadio 15 de Abril – Santa Fe
- Estadio 23 de Agosto - San Salvador de Jujuy
- Estadio Alberto José Armando (La Bombonera) – Buenos Aires
- Estadio Brigadier General Estanislao López – Santa Fe
- Estadio Ciudad de La Plata – Ciudad de La Plata
- Estadio Ciudad de Vicente López – Vicente Lopez
- Estadio Diego Armando Maradona – Buenos Aires
- Estadio Don León Kolbowski – Buenos Aires
- Estadio El Gigante del Norte – Salta
- Estadio Julio César Villagra (El Gigante de Alberdi) – Córdoba
- Estadio Eduardo Gallardón – Buenos Aires
- Estadio Florencio Solá – Banfield
- Estadio Gabino Sosa – Rosario
- Estadio Gigante de Arroyito – Rosario
- Estadio Instituto de Córdoba – Córdoba
- Estadio José Amalfitani – Buenos Aires
- Estadio Centenario Ciudad de Quilmes – Quilmes
- Estadio José María Minella – Mar de Plata
- Estadio José María Olaeta – Rosario
- Estadio Juan Carlos Zerrillo (El Bosque)– Ciudad de La Plata
- Estadio Ciudad de Lanús-Néstor Díaz Pérez – Lanús
- Estadio Libertadores de América-Ricardo Enrique Bochini – Avellaneda
- Estadio Malvinas Argentinas – Mendoza
- Estadio Marcelo Bielsa – Rosario
- Estadio Mâs Monumental – Buenos Aires
- Estadio José Dellagiovanna (Monumental de Victoria)– Tigre
- Estadio Cubierto Newell's Old Boys – Rosario
- Estadio Nueva Chicago – Buenos Aires
- Estadio Nueva España – Buenos Aires
- Estadio Mario Alberto Kempes – Córdoba
- Estadio Parque Roca – Buenos Aires
- Estadio Pedro Bidegain – Buenos Aires
- Estadio Presidente Perón (El Cilindro) – Avellaneda
- Estadio Arquitecto Ricardo Etcheverri – Buenos Aires
- Estadio Tomás Adolfo Ducó – Buenos Aires

=== Bolivia ===
- Estadio Félix Capriles – Cochabamba
- Estadio Hernando Siles – La Paz
- Estadio Olímpico Patria – Sucre
- Estadio Ramón Tahuichi Aguilera – Santa Cruz

=== Brazil ===
- Arena Coliseu Mateus Aquino – Alto Santo
- Arena Joinville – Joinville
- Estádio Ademar da Costa Carvalho (Ilha do Retiro) – Recife
- Estádio Aderbal Ramos da Silva (Ressacada) – Florianópolis
- Estádio Alberto Oliveira (Estádio Jóia da Princesa) – Feira de Santana
- Estádio Alfredo Schurig (Fazendinha or Parque São Jorge) – São Paulo
- Estádio Alfredo Jaconi – Caxias do Sul
- Estádio Anísio Haddad (Rio Pretão) – São José do Rio Preto
- Estádio Barão da Serra Negra – Piracicaba
- Estádio Benedito Teixeira (Teixeirão) – São José do Rio Preto
- Estádio Brinco de Ouro – Campinas
- Estádio Centenário – Caxias do Sul
- Estádio Centro Poliesportivo Pinheiro – Curitiba
- Estádio Cícero Pompeu de Toledo (Morumbi) – São Paulo
- Estádio Dr. Francisco de Palma Travassos, Ribeirão Preto
- Estádio Eduardo José Farah (Farazhão) – Presidente Prudente
- Estádio Fredis Saldívar (Douradão) – Dourados
- Estádio Godofredo Cruz – Campos dos Goytacazes
- Estádio Governador Alberto Tavares Silva (Albertão) – Teresina
- Estádio Governador Ernani Sátiro (O Amigão) – Campina Grande
- Estádio Heriberto Hülse – Criciúma
- Estádio Jacy Scaff (Do Café) – Londrina
- Estadio Governador João Castelo (Castelão) – São Luís
- Estádio Governador José Fragelli (Verdão) – Cuiabá
- Estádio Jornalista Mário Filho (Maracanã) – Rio de Janeiro
- Estádio José Américo de Almeida Filho (Almeidão) – João Pessoa
- Estádio José do Rego Maciel (Arruda) – Recife
- Estádio José Pinheiro Borba (Beira Rio) – Porto Alegre
- Estádio Kléber Andrade – Cariacica
- Estádio Luiz José de Lacerda (Lacerdão) – Caruaru
- Estádio Magalhães Pinto (Mineirão) – Belo Horizonte
- Estádio Major Antônio do Couto Pereira – Curitiba
- Estádio Major José Levy Sobrinho (Limeirão) – Limeira
- Estádio Mané Garrincha – Brasília
- Estádio Manoel Barradas (Barradão) – Salvador
- Estádio Maria Lamas Farache (Frasqueirão) – Natal
- Estádio Martins Pereira – São José dos Campos
- Estádio Municipal Adail Nunes da Silva (Taquarão) – Taquaritinga
- Estádio Municipal João Guido (Uberabão) – Uberaba
- Estádio Municipal João Havelange (Parque do Sabiá) – Uberlândia
- Estádio Municipal Juscelino Kubitschek – Itumbiara
- Estádio Municipal Nhozinho Santos – São Luís
- Estádio Municipal Prefeito Dilson Luiz de Melo (Melão) – Varginha
- Estádio Municipal Radialista Mario Helênio – Juiz de Fora
- Estádio Olímpico Colosso da Lagoa – Erechim
- Estádio Olímpico Edgard Proença (Mangueirão) – Belém
- Estádio Olímpico João Havelange – Rio de Janeiro
- Estádio Olímpico Monumental – Porto Alegre
- Estádio Olímpico Regional Arnaldo Busatto – Cascavel
- Estádio Octávio Mangabeira (Fonte Nova) – Salvador
- Estádio do Pacaembu, São Paulo
- Estádio Palestra Itália (Parque Antártica) – São Paulo
- Estádio Papa João Paulo II – Moji-Mirim
- Estádio Pedro Victor de Albuquerque – Caruaru
- Estádio Plácido Castelo – Fortaleza
- Estádio Rei Pelé – Maceió
- Estádio Santa Cruz – Ribeirão Preto
- Estádio São Januário – Rio de Janeiro
- Estádio Serra Dourada – Goiânia
- Estádio da Universidade de Lavras – Lavras
- Estádio Universitário Pedro Pedrossian (Morenão) – Campo Grande
- Estádio Universitário São Paulo – São Paulo
- Estádio Vivaldo Lima – Manaus
- Estádio Waldomiro Pereira – Patos de Minas
- Kyocera Arena – Curitiba (formerly Estádio Joaquim Américo, or Arena da Baixada)

=== Chile ===
- Club Hípico de Santiago – Santiago
- Coliseo La Tortuga – Talcahuano
- Estadio Carlos Dittborn – Arica
- Estadio El Cobre – El Salvador
- Estadio El Teniente – Rancagua
- Estadio Fiscal de Talca – Talca
- Estadio La Granja – Curicó
- Estadio La Portada – La Serena
- Estadio Las Higueras – Talcahuano
- Estadio Monumental David Arellano – Santiago
- Estadio Municipal de Calama – Calama, Chile
- Estadio Municipal de Concepción – Concepción
- Estadio Municipal de La Cisterna – Santiago
- Estadio Municipal de La Florida – La Florida
- Estadio Municipal Francisco Sánchez Rumoroso – Coquimbo
- Estadio Municipal Germán Becker – Temuco
- Estadio Municipal Roberto Bravo Santibáñez – Melipilla
- Estadio Municipal Rubén Marcos Peralta (Formerly Parque Schott) – Osorno
- Estadio Nacional (Chile) – Santiago
- Estadio Playa Ancha – Valparaíso
- Estadio Regional de Antofagasta – Santiago
- Estadio Regional de Chinquihue – Puerto Montt
- Estadio San Carlos de Apoquindo – Santiago
- Estadio Santa Laura – Independencia
- Estadio Santiago Bueras – Maipú, Chile
- Sausalito Stadium – Viña del Mar
- Estadio Víctor Jara
- Medialuna Monumental de Rancagua – Rancagua
- Movistar Arena (Formerly Arena Santiago) – Santiago

=== Colombia ===
- Atanasio Girardot Sports Complex – Medellín
- Estadio Deportivo Cali – Cali
- Estadio El Campín – Bogotá
- Estadio General Santander – Cúcuta
- Estadio Hernán Ramírez Villegas – Pereira
- Estadio Metropolitano Roberto Meléndez – Barranquilla
- Estadio Olímpico Pascual Guerrero – Cali

=== Ecuador ===
- Estadio Monumental Isidro Romero Carbo – Guayaquil
- Estadio La Casa Blanca – Quito
- Estadio Modelo – Guayaquil
- Estadio Olímpico Atahualpa – Quito

=== Falkland Islands ===
- Sports Center – Stanley

=== French Guiana ===
- Stade de Baduel – Cayenne

=== Guyana ===
- Bourda Cricket Ground – Georgetown
- Georgetown Football Stadium – Georgetown
- Providence Stadium – Georgetown

=== Paraguay ===
- Estadio Defensores del Chaco – Asunción
- Estadio Feliciano Cáceres – Luque
- Estadio General Pablo Rojas – Asunción
- Estadio Manuel Ferreira – Asunción

=== Peru ===
- Estadio Nacional Coloso de José Díaz – Lima Province
- Estadio Universidad San Marcos – Lima Province
- Estadio Monumental "U" – Lima Province
- Estadio Alejandro Villanueva – Lima Province
- Estadio Miguel Grau – Piura
- Estadio Teodoro Lolo Fernández – Lima Province
- Estadio Municipal de Chorrillos – Lima Province
- Plaza de Acho – Lima Province
- Plaza de Sol y Sombra – Lima Province
- Estadio Monumental (Universidad Nacional San Agustín) – Arequipa
- Estadio Mariano Melgar – Arequipa
- Estadio Mansiche – Trujillo
- Estadio Elías Aguirre – Chiclayo
- Estadio Miguel Grau – Callao
- Estadio Max Augustín – Iquitos
- Estadio Manuel Gómez Arellano – Chimbote
- Estadio Huancayo – Huancayo
- Estadio Inca Garcilaso de la Vega – Cusco
- Estadio Official de Pucallpa – Pucallpa
- Estadio Jorge Basadre – Tacna
- Estadio José Picasso Peratta – Ica
- Estadio Campeones del 36 – Sullana
- Estadio E. Torres Belón – Puno
- Estadio Heraclio Tapia – Huánuco
- Estadio Campeonísimo – Talara
- Estadio Héroes de San Ramón – Cajamarca
- Estadio Julio Lores Colán – Huaral
- Estadio Monumental – Jauja
- Estadio Daniel Alcides Carrión – Cerro de Pasco

=== Suriname ===
- André Kamperveen Stadion – Paramaribo

=== Uruguay ===
- Estadio Atilio Paiva Olivera – Rivera
- Estadio Centenario – Montevideo
- Estadio Gran Parque Central – Montevideo
- Estadio Campeón del Siglo – Montevideo
- Estadio Luis Franzini – Montevideo

=== Venezuela ===
- Estadio Alfonso Chico Carrasquel – Puerto la Cruz
- Estadio Antonio Herrera Gutiérrez – Barquisimeto
- Estadio BR Julio Hernández Molina – Araure
- Estadio José Bernardo Pérez – Valencia
- Estadio José Pachencho Romero – Maracaibo
- Estadio José Pérez Colmenares – Maracay
- Estadio La Ceiba – San Félix
- Estadio Luis Aparicio El Grande – Maracaibo
- Estadio Metropolitano – San Cristóbal
- Estadio Misael Delgado – Valencia
- Estadio Monumental de Caracas Simón Bolívar – Caracas
- Estadio Olímpico – Caracas
- Estadio Pueblo Nuevo – San Cristóbal
- Estadio Universitario – Caracas

== Gallery ==
South American stadiums

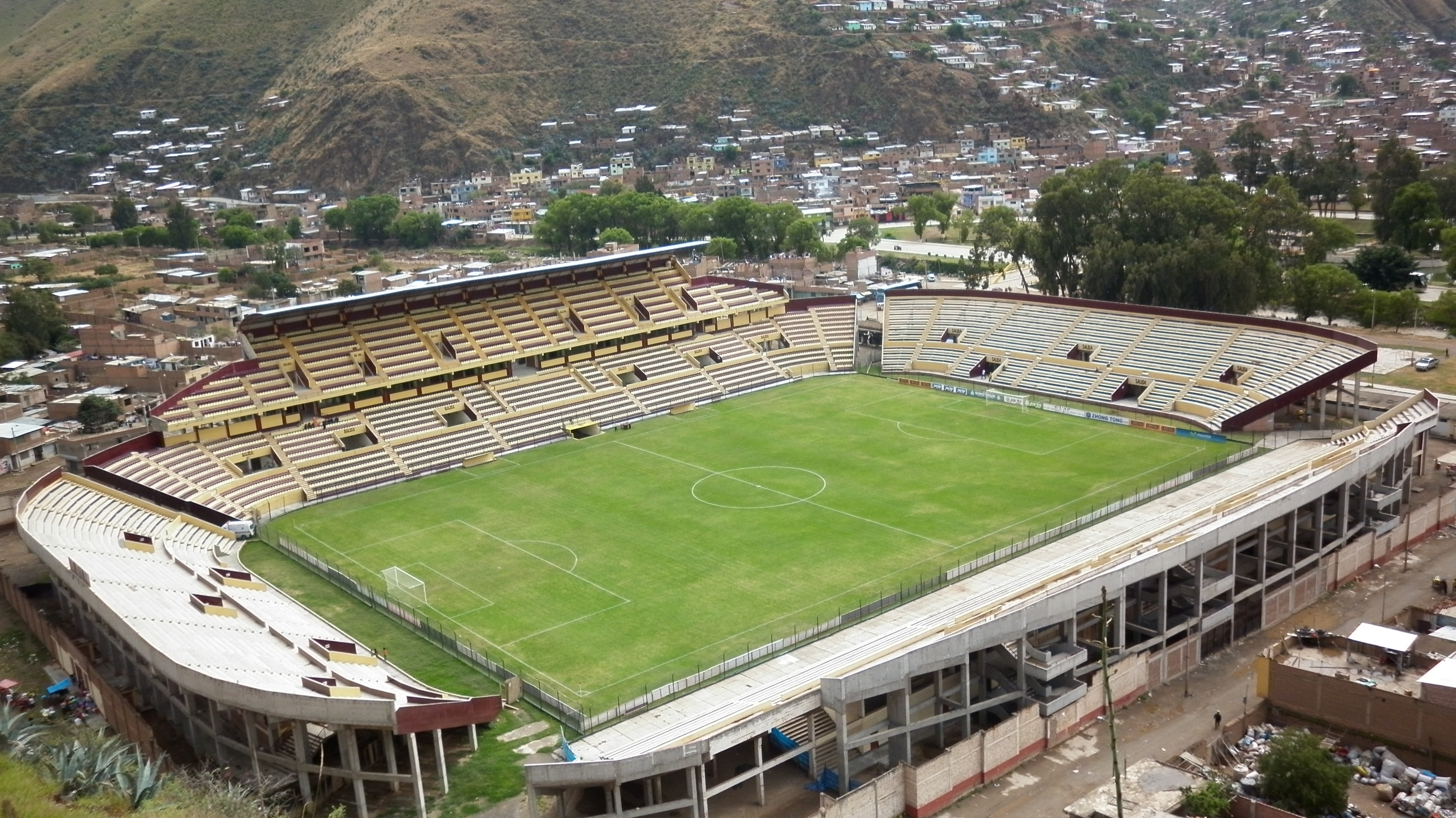
Estadio Heraclio Tapia

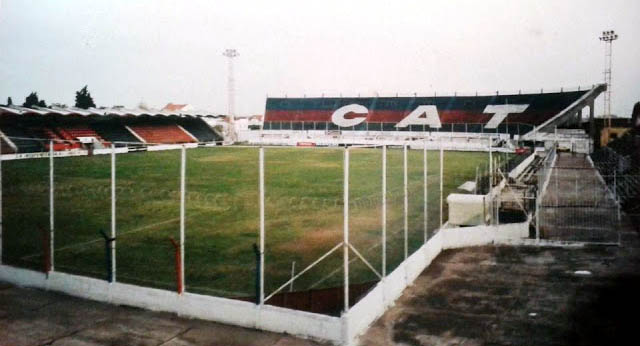
Estadio José Dellagiovanna

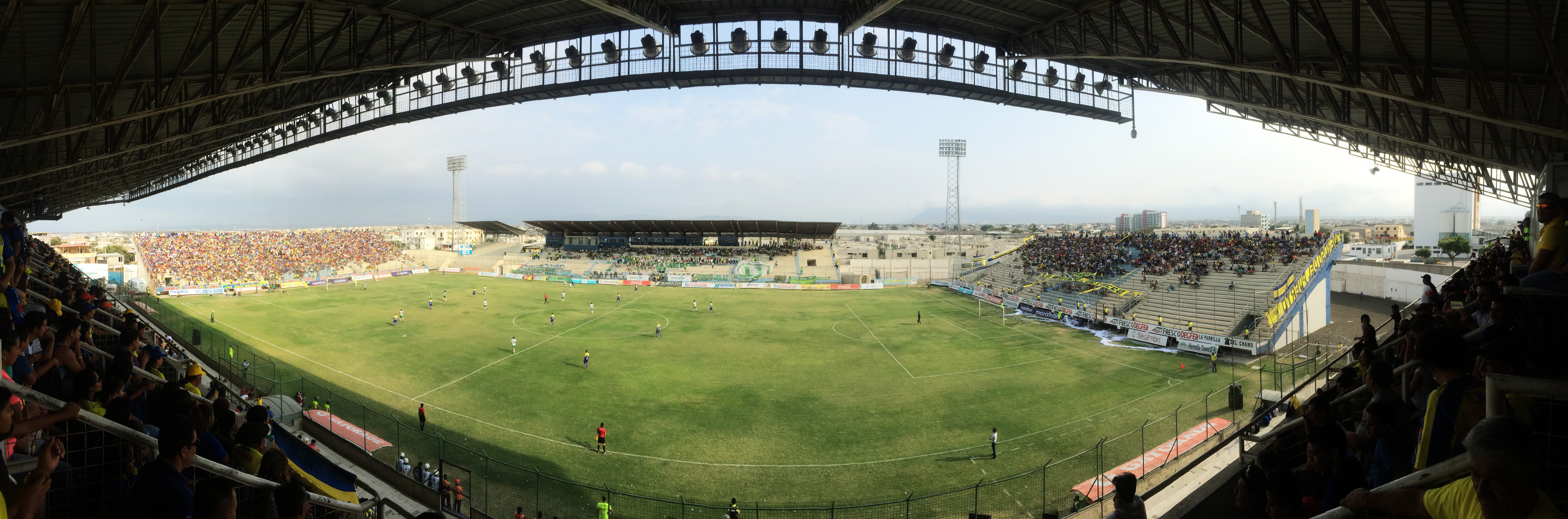
Estadio Municipal Jocay

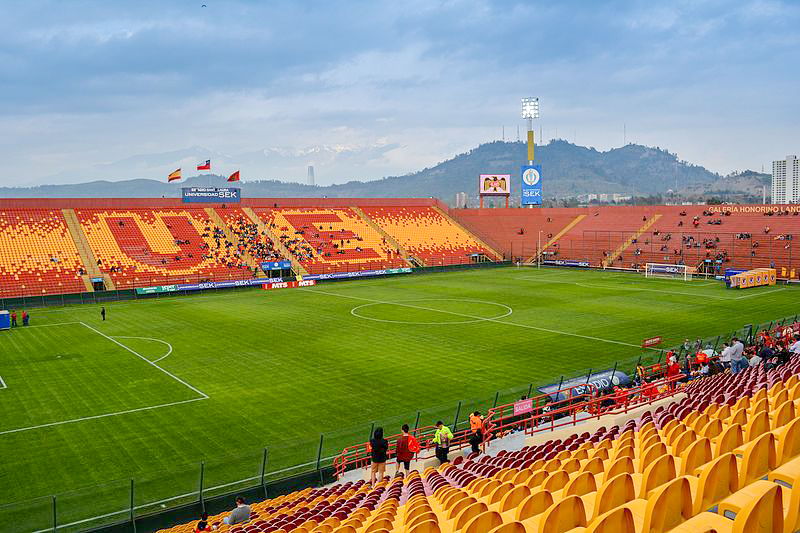
Estadio Santa Laura-Universidad SEK

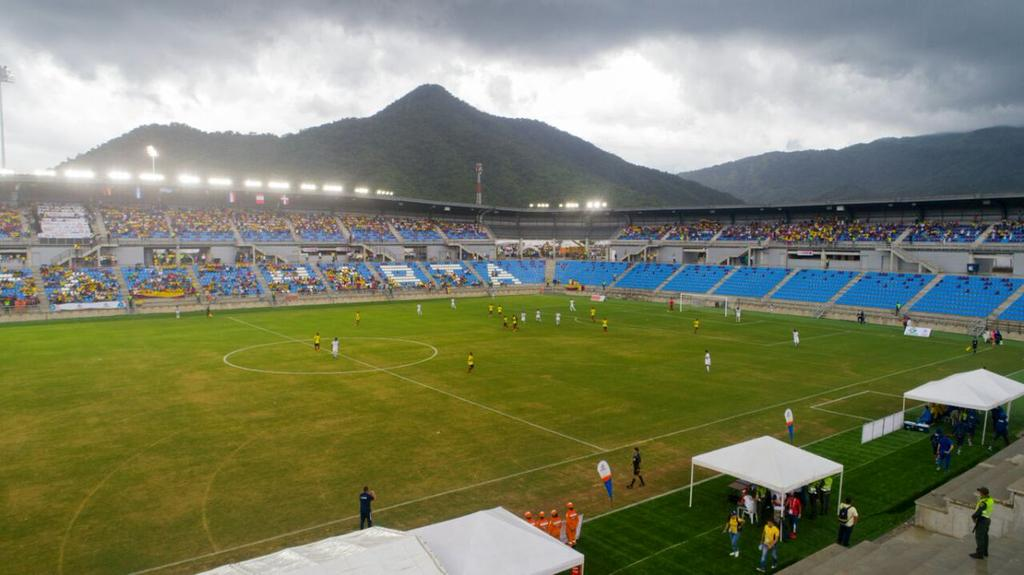
Estadio Sierra Nevada

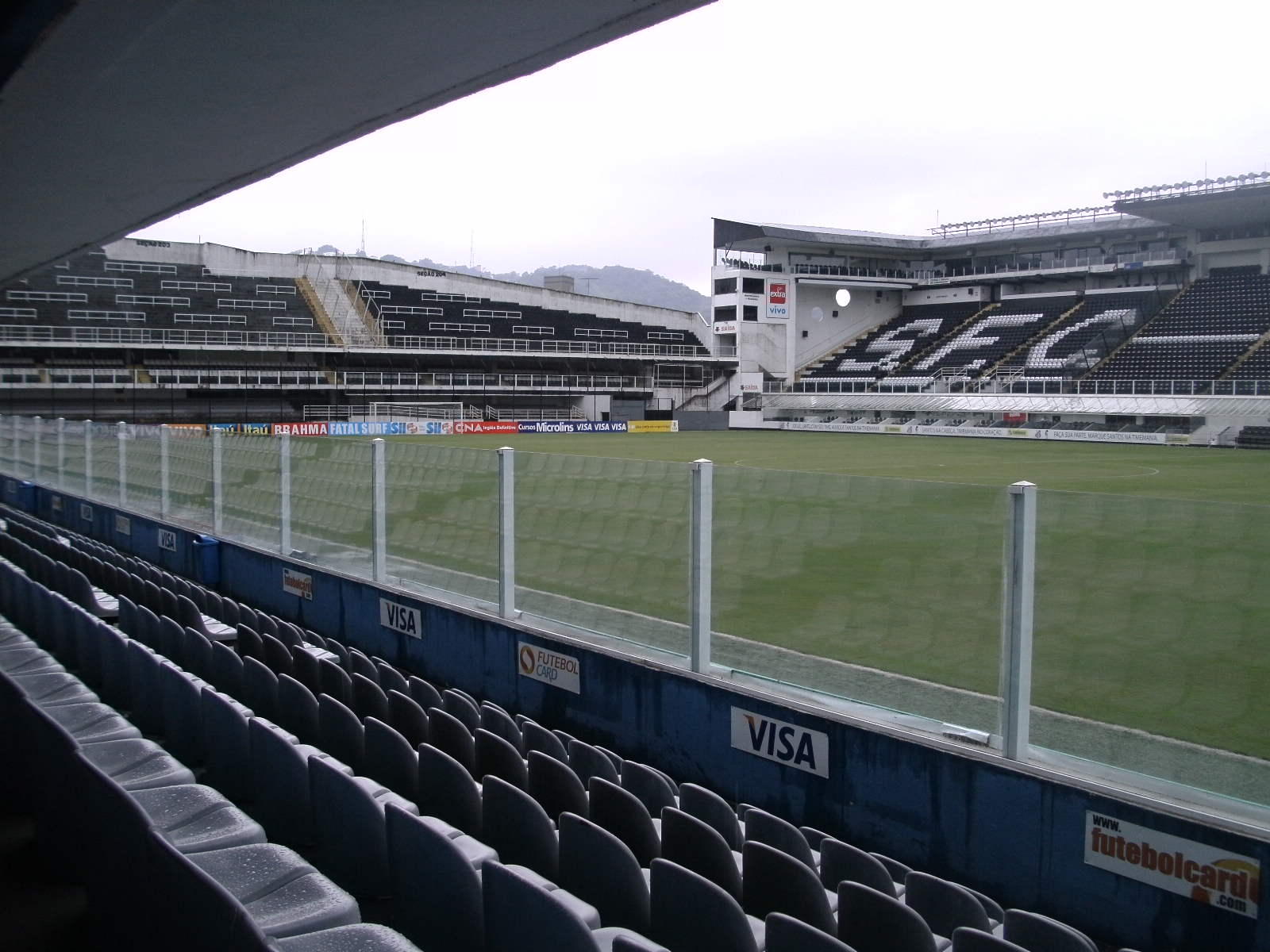
Estádio Urbano Caldeira

== See also ==
- List of stadiums in Africa
- List of stadiums in Asia
- List of stadiums in Central America and the Caribbean
- List of stadiums in Europe
- List of stadiums in North America
- List of stadiums in Oceania
- List of South American stadiums by capacity
- List of association football stadiums by country
- Lists of stadiums
