= 2025–26 LVBP season =

- League: Venezuelan Professional Baseball League
- Sport: Baseball
- Duration: September 2025 – January 2026
- Games: 56 games (regular season)
- Teams: 8
- TV partner(s): (Venezuela) Venevision (Philippines) One Sports+

Regular season
- Season champions: Cardenales de Lara
- Season MVP: Balbino Fuenmayor (ANZ)

Final Series
- Champions: Navegantes del Magallanes (14th title)
- Runners-up: Caribes de Anzoátegui

Seasons
- ← 2024–25 2026–27 →

The 2025–26 LVBP season is the 80th edition of the Venezuelan Professional Baseball League (LVBP), the top-level professional baseball league in Venezuela. The regular season started on October 15, and will run to December 27, 2025. Playoffs are scheduled to begin on December 28th, with the final series is expected to begin on January 23rd, 2026.

The season is the 80th edition of Venezuela's professional winter league, and will be played in honor of Dave Concepción, a former player and manager with the Tigres de Aragua. Cardenales de Lara are the defending champions, having won their seventh championship in the 2024 season.

The winners of the 2025–26 season was initially slated to represent Venezuela at the 2026 Caribbean Series, scheduled to be held on home soil in Caracas and La Guaira. However, the tournament was later moved to Mexico due to geopolitical tensions; the LVBP announced that Venezuela would instead host the 2026 Serie de las Américas. It was the first time since 2003 that the LVBP did not participate in the Caribbean Series.

On January 3, 2026, the playoff round robin was temporarily suspended due to the 2026 United States strikes in Venezuela. Play resumed four days later, but Major League Baseball recommended that its affiliated players leave the country due to fears of further unrest.

== Competition format ==
The regular season will feature 56 games for each team, with each team playing eight games series against the others. The top four teams in the standings will advance directly to the round robin playoffs, while the fifth and sixth-place teams will compete in a Wild Card Series for the 5th spot there. The top two teams in the round-robin tournament will move on to the final series, which is expected to begin on January 23.

== Regular season ==
The season opened with a game between the champion Cardenales de Lara and the Tigres de Aragua on October 15, with the rest of the league opening on October 16. Estadio Metropolitano in San Cristóbal, Táchira will host the "Serie Táchira" on Dec. 7-8, between the Navegantes del Magallanes and the Caribes de Anzoátegui. Observers have suggested the series may be a means to gauge interest in expanding the league to Táchira State.

=== Standings ===
As of 28 December 2025

Pos	Team	G	W	L	Pct.	GB	Home	Road	RS	RA	RD
1	Cardenales de Lara	56	30	26	.536	—	16—12	14—14	352	307	+45
2	Bravos de Margarita	56	29	27	.518	1	15—12	14—15	308	295	+13
3	Navegantes del Magallanes	56	29	27	.518	1	18—10	11—17	309	277	+32
4	Águilas del Zulia	56	29	27	.518	1	16–12	13–15	261	337	-76
5	Caribes de Anzoátegui	56	28	28	.500	2	18—10	10—10	349	326	+23
6	Tigres de Aragua	56	28	28	.500	2	19—9	9—19	282	281	+1
7	Tiburones de La Guaira	56	27	29	.482	3	14—14	13—15	319	320	-1
8	Leones del Caracas	56	24	32	.429	6	14—14	10—18	319	356	-37

Classified to Round Robin
Classified to Wild Card Series

== Playoffs ==
=== Wild Card Series ===
Caribes (Note: Under LVBP regulations, the Wild Card series is played between the fifth- and sixth-ranked teams in the regular season. The fifth-place team (Caribes) has the advantage of only needing to win one Wild Card game to advance to the playoff round robin while the sixth-place team would need to win both games to advance.) won the series, 1-1.

Game	Date	Score	Location	Time	Attendance
1	December 29	Tigres de Aragua – 5, Caribes de Anzoátegui – 4	Estadio Alfonso Chico Carrasquel	3:48	6,143
2	December 30	Tigres de Aragua – 12, Caribes de Anzoátegui – 13	Estadio Alfonso Chico Carrasquel	4:28	—

=== Round Robin ===
As of 26 January 2025

Pos	Team	G	W	L	Pct.	GB	Home	Road	RS	RA	RD
1	Caribes de Anzoátegui	16	10	6	.625	–	5—3	5—3	109	82	+27
2	Navegantes del Magallanes	16	10	6	.625	–	4—4	6—2	98	93	+5
3	Cardenales de Lara	16	9	7	.563	1	5—3	4—4	123	86	+37
4	Águilas del Zulia	16	7	9	.438	3	3–5	4–4	78	99	-21
5	Bravos de Margarita	16	4	12	.250	6	1—7	3—5	83	131	-48

=== Final Series ===
Magallanes won the series, 4-2.

Game	Date	Score	Location	Time	Attendance
1	January 27	Navegantes del Magallanes – 12, Caribes de Anzoátegui – 4	Estadio Alfonso Chico Carrasquel	4:14	10,446
2	January 28	Navegantes del Magallanes – 3, Caribes de Anzoátegui – 1	Estadio Alfonso Chico Carrasquel	3:18	10,917
3	January 29	Caribes de Anzoátegui – 9, Navegantes del Magallanes – 7	Estadio José Bernardo Pérez	3:49	15,867
4	January 30	Caribes de Anzoátegui – 5, Navegantes del Magallanes – 14	Estadio José Bernardo Pérez	3:50	15,897
5	February 1	Caribes de Anzoátegui – 5, Navegantes del Magallanes – 3	Estadio José Bernardo Pérez	3:26	15,900
6	February 1	Navegantes del Magallanes – 14, Caribes de Anzoátegui – 6	Estadio Alfonso Chico Carrasquel	3:58	12,423

== Managerial changes ==
=== Off season ===
Team	Former manager	Reason for leaving	New manager	Ref.
Tiburones de La Guaira	(Venezuela) Ozzie Guillén	Reassigned	(Venezuela) Gregorio Petit	
Caribes de Anzoátegui	(United States) Morgan Ensberg	Reassigned	(Venezuela) Asdrúbal Cabrera	
Bravos de Margarita	(Venezuela) José Moreno	Resigned	(Venezuela) Henry Blanco	
Cardenales de Lara	(Venezuela) Henry Blanco	Reassigned	(Venezuela) César Izturis	
Tigres de Aragua	(United States) Buddy Bailey	Fired	(Venezuela) Ozzie Guillén	

=== In season ===
Team	Former manager	Reason for leaving	New manager	Notes
Navegantes del Magallanes	Eduardo Pérez	Resigned	Yadier Molina	On November 5, 2025, Pérez stepped down as manager of Navegantes by "mutual agreement" with the club, to be replaced on an interim basis by bench coach Mario Lisson. At the time, Magallanes was 5-11 and last in the standings; Pérez's overall regular season record with the team was 34-38 over two seasons. The next day, the team announced that Molina, who previously served as manager in the 2021–22 season, would return as manager.
Tiburones de La Guaira	Gregorio Petit	Fired	Marco Davalillo	On November 17, 2025, Tiburones announced they had fired Gregorio Petit; he finished with an 11-15 record, tied for last place.

=== Postseason ===
Team	Former manager	Reason for leaving	New manager	Notes
Navegantes del Magallanes	Yadier Molina	Reassigned	César Izturis	Regular season manager Yadier Molina was ineligible to pilot Magallanes to the 2026 Serie de las Américas, due to his affiliation with MLB and his commitment to the Puerto Rico national baseball team ahead of the 2026 World Baseball Classic. He was replaced by Cardenales manager César Izturis.

== League leaders ==
As of 28 December 2025

Hitting leaders
Stat	Player	Team	Total
AVG	(Venezuela) Gorkys Hernández	Aragua	.374
HR	(Venezuela) Balbino Fuenmayor	Anzoátegui	17
RBI	3 tied with (Note: Hernán Pérez (ANZ), Wilson García (MAR))		52
R	(Venezuela) Gorkys Hernández	Aragua	46
H	2 tied with (Note: Gorkys Hernández (ANZ), Alexi Amarista (MAR))		77
BB	(Venezuela) Rafael Ortega	Lara	48
SB	(Venezuela) Herlis Rodríguez	Anzoátegui	19
OBP	(Venezuela) Gorkys Hernández	Aragua	.480
SLG	(Venezuela) Jadher Areinamo	La Guaira	.692
OPS	(Venezuela) Jadher Areinamo	La Guaira	1.112

Pitching leaders
Stat	Player	Team	Total
W	4 tied with (Note: Ronnie Williams (ARA), Emerson Martinez (LAG), Ricardo Sánchez (MAG), Saul García (MAG))		5
L	(Venezuela) Luis Arejula	La Guaira	7
ERA	(Venezuela) Ricardo Sánchez	Magallanes	3.04
K	(United States) Zac Grotz	La Guaira	64
IP	(Venezuela) Ricardo Sánchez	Magallanes	68.0
SV	(Venezuela) Silvino Bracho	Zulia	11

== Awards and honors ==
=== Player of the Week ===
Week	Player	Position	Team	Ref.
1	(Venezuela) Aldrem Corredor	1B	Caracas	
2	(Venezuela) Balbino Fuenmayor	1B	Anzoátegui	
3	(Venezuela) Harold Castro	2B	Caracas	
4	(Venezuela) Yonathan Daza	CF	Caracas	
5	(Venezuela) Balbino Fuenmayor	1B	Anzoátegui	
6	(Venezuela) Jadher Areinamo	2B	La Guaira	
7	(Venezuela) Wilson García	1B	Margarita	
8	(Venezuela) Wilmer Font	P	Caracas	
9	(Venezuela) Balbino Fuenmayor	1B	Anzoátegui	
10	(Venezuela) Antonio Piñero	3B	Anzoátegui	
11	(Venezuela) Luis Sardiñas	IF	Magallanes	
RR	(Venezuela) Aldrem Corredor	1B	Anzoátegui	

=== Awards ===
Balbino Fuenmayor won his second LVBP MVP award

Award	Player	Team	Ref.
Hitters of the Year	(Venezuela) Balbino Fuenmayor (Venezuela) Hernán Pérez	Anzoátegui	
Closer of the Year	(Venezuela) Silvino Bracho	Zulia	
Setup Man of the Year	(Dominican Republic) Jesús Reyes	Magallanes	
Rookie of the Year	(Venezuela) Jadher Areinamo	La Guaira	
Comeback Player of the Year	(Venezuela) Hernán Pérez	Anzoátegui	
Carrao Bracho Trophy	(Venezuela) Ricardo Sánchez	Magallanes	
Manager of the Year	(Puerto Rico) Yadier Molina	Magallanes	
Most Valuable Player	(Venezuela) Balbino Fuenmayor	Anzoátegui	
