= Carrao Bracho Trophy =

- Sport: Baseball
- League: Venezuelan Professional Baseball League
- Awarded for: Best regular season pitcher

History
- First award: 1986 (Ubaldo Heredia)
- Most wins: Omar Daal, Jeff Farnsworth, Raul Rivero (2)
- Most recent: Ricardo Sánchez

The Carrao Bracho Trophy (Spanish: Premio Carrao Bracho, lit. "Carrao Bracho Award") is given annually to the Venezuelan Professional Baseball League pitcher who has recorded the best individual performance in that year, as voted on by members of the media.

The award was originally created in 1985 as the VPBL Pitcher of the Year Award, and was renamed Carrao Bracho Trophy since 1995 to honour José "Carrao" Bracho, who spent 26 years in the league.

Bracho still owns all-time career records in several pitching categories, including most wins, complete games, strikeouts and innings pitched, as well as the record for the most wins in a single-season.

== Award winners ==
As of 30 January 2014.

| Season | Pitcher | Team | Record | ERA | K's | Ref. |
|---|---|---|---|---|---|---|
| 1985–86 | (Venezuela) Ubaldo Heredia | Leones del Caracas | 8-3 | 2.44 | 48 | |
| 1986–87 | (United States) Dennis Powell | Leones del Caracas | 7-0 | 1.68 | 31 | |
| 1987–88 | (Venezuela) Oswald Peraza | Cardenales de Lara | 6-1 | 1.16 | 42 | |
| 1988–89 | (Venezuela) Julio César Strauss | Leones del Caracas | 8-1 | 2.14 | 31 | |
| 1989–90 | (United States) Jim Neidlinger | Leones del Caracas | 8-2 | 2.99 | 65 | |
| 1990–91 | (United States) Joe Ausanio | Tigres de Aragua | 8-4 | 2.94 | 68 | |
| 1991–92 | (Venezuela) Wilson Álvarez | Águilas del Zulia | 8-0 | 1.47 | 64 | |
| 1992–93 | (Venezuela) Antonio Castillo | Cardenales de Lara | 9-4 | 2.22 | 79 | |
| 1993–94 | (Venezuela) Juan Carlos Pulido | Navegantes del Magallanes | 11-1 | 2.24 | 50 | |
| 1994–95 | (Venezuela) Richard Garcés | Tigres de Aragua | 3-0 | 0.30 | 32 | |
| 1995–96 | (Venezuela) Omar Daal | Leones del Caracas | 10-2 | 1.68 | 73 | |
| 1996–97 | (Venezuela) Omar Daal (2) | Leones del Caracas | 9-1 | 1.49 | 64 | |
| 1997–98 | (Venezuela) Beiker Graterol | Cardenales de Lara | 9-1 | 1.67 | 50 | |
| 1998–99 | (United States) Mike Romano | Cardenales de Lara | 8-1 | 2.49 | 36 | |
| 1999–00 | (United States) Keith Evans | Pastora de los Llanos | 9-2 | 2.49 | 47 | |
| 2000–01 | (Venezuela) Edwin Hurtado | Cardenales de Lara | 11-1 | 3.24 | 66 | |
| 2001–02 | (United States) Jeff Farnsworth | Cardenales de Lara | 7-0 | 1.51 | 38 | |
| 2002–03 | Not held due to a player's strike | | | | | |
| 2003–04 | (United States) Jeff Farnsworth (2) | Cardenales de Lara | 8-3 | 2.08 | 86 | |
| 2004–05 | (Venezuela) Ricardo Palma | Pastora de los Llanos | 6-2 | 2.02 | 51 | |
| 2005–06 | (United States) Scott Eyre | Tigres de Aragua | 9-0 | 1.26 | 39 | |
| 2006–07 | (Venezuela) Horacio Estrada | Tigres de Aragua | 5-1 | 1.96 | 50 | |
| 2007–08 | (Venezuela) Alex Herrera | Caribes de Anzoátegui | 8-2 | 3.89 | 52 | |
| 2008–09 | (United States) David Austen | Águilas del Zulia | 8-2 | 1.98 | 38 | |
| 2009–10 | (Venezuela) Jean Machí | Navegantes del Magallanes | 2-0 | 1.25 | 27 | |
| 2010–11 | (Venezuela) Andrew Baldwin | Caribes de Anzoátegui | 5-2 | 2.08 | 47 | |
| 2011–12 | (Venezuela) Renyel Pinto | Caribes de Anzoátegui | 6-1 | 2.43 | 73 | |
| 2012–13 | (United States) Dwayne Pollok | Águilas del Zulia | 7–2 | 2.36 | 46 | |
| 2013–14 | (United States) Mitch Lively | Navegantes del Magallanes | 6–1 | 1.70 | 41 | |
| 2014–15 | (Venezuela) José Álvarez | Caribes de Anzoátegui | 6–2 | 1.91 | 40 | |
| 2015–16 | (Venezuela) Raul Rivero | Cardenales de Lara | 7–4 | 2.03 | 54 | |
| 2016–17 | (Venezuela) Raul Rivero (2) | Cardenales de Lara | 7–1 | 2.17 | 61 | |
| 2017–18 | (Venezuela) Guillermo Moscoso | Tigres de Aragua | 5–2 | 2.05 | 45 | |
| 2018–19 | (Cuba) Jorge Martínez | Cardenales de Lara | 5–3 | 2.26 | 40 | |
| 2019–20 | (Venezuela) Yohan Pino | Navegantes del Magallanes | 5–1 | 2.11 | 40 | |
| 2020–21 | (Venezuela) Erick Leal | Navegantes del Magallanes | 7–7 | 1.31 | 24 | |
| 2021–22 | (United States) Jackson Stephens | Cardenales de Lara | 6–3 | 1.82 | 44 | |
| 2022–23 | (Venezuela) Mario Sanchez | Águilas del Zulia | 2–3 | 2.38 | 34 | |
| 2023–24 | (Venezuela) Osmer Morales | Bravos de Margarita | 7–0 | 2.26 | 51 | |
| 2024–25 | (Venezuela) Junior Guerra | Navegantes del Magallanes | 8–1 | 2.63 | 48 | |
| 2025–26 | (Venezuela) Ricardo Sánchez | Navegantes del Magallanes | 5–1 | 3.04 | 58 | |
