= 2010–11 Venezuelan Professional Baseball League season =

The 2010–11 Venezuelan Professional Baseball League season (Spanish: Liga Venezolana de Béisbol Profesional or LVBP) was contested in two round robin league phases and a playoff final.

== First league phase ==
This round is called "Ronda Eliminatoria" or "Regular" by the league.

It was played from 12 October to 30 December.

Team	Games	Wins	Losses	Pct	GB
Leones del Caracas	63	35	28	.556	–
Aguilas del Zulia	63	35	28	.556	–
Caribes de Anzoátegui	63	34	29	.540	1
Tigres de Aragua	63	33	30	.524	2
Bravos de Margarita	61	31	30	.508	3
Navegantes del Magallanes	63	28	35	.444	7
Cardenales de Lara	63	28	35	.444	7
Tiburones de La Guaira	61	26	35	.426	8

The first five teams advanced to the second league phase.

== Offensive and defensive leaders ==
Pitching

- Earned run average: Andrew Baldwin (Caribes) 2.08
- Wins: Yorman Bazardo (Tigres) 7

Batting

- Home runs: Luis Jiménez (Cardenales) 12
- Batting average: Josh Kroeger (Leones) 369

== Second league phase ==
This round is called "Round Robin" or "Semi-final" by the league.

It was intended to be played from January, 2nd to January, 21st, but Aragua and Caracas ended in a tie, and had to play an extra tie-breaking game on 22 January. The extra game was played in Caracas because the Leones had finished with a better record during the first phase of the tournament.

Team	Games	Wins	Losses	Pct	GB
Caribes de Anzoátegui	16	11	5	.688	–
Tigres de Aragua(*)	16	10	6	.625	1
Leones del Caracas(*)	16	10	6	.625	1
Bravos de Margarita	16	5	11	.313	6
Águilas del Zulia	16	4	12	.250	7

The top two teams classified to the championship series.

(*) Aragua and Caracas played an extra, tie-breaking game to decide who would play against Anzoátegui in the final after finishing with a 10–6 record during the round robin/semi final phase. The extra game was played on 22 January 2011, in Caracas' "Universitario" stadium, with victory for the away team, Tigres de Aragua, with a 5–2 score.

== Championship series ==
Team	Wins	Losses	Pct	GB
Caribes de Anzoategui	4	3	.571	–
Tigres de Aragua	3	4	.429	1

Games:

Date	Stadium	City	Score	Series progression
23 January 2011	Alfonso "Chico" Carrasquel	Puerto la Cruz	Tigres 5 – Caribes 8	Caribes leads 1–0
24 January 2011	Alfonso "Chico" Carrasquel	Puerto la Cruz	Tigres 7 – Caribes 8	Caribes leads 2–0
26 January 2011	José Pérez Colmenares	Maracay	Caribes 4 – Tigres 8	Caribes leads 2–1
27 January 2011	José Pérez Colmenares	Maracay	Caribes 0 – Tigres 16	tied 2-2
28 January 2011	José Pérez Colmenares	Maracay	Caribes 8 – Tigres 7	Caribes leads 3–2
29 January 2011	Alfonso "Chico" Carrasquel	Puerto la Cruz	Tigres 4 – Caribes 1	tied 3-3
30 January 2011	Alfonso "Chico" Carrasquel	Puerto la Cruz	Tigres 7 – Caribes 8	Caribes wins series 4–3

The Caribes de Anzoátegui were crowned LVBP 2010-2011 Champions. This is the first title in the franchise's 20-year history.

The Championship Series' MVP was Luis Jiménez, who was playing for the Caribes as a reinforcement.

== Awards ==
- Most Valuable Player (Víctor Davalillo Award): Josh Kroeger (Leones del Caracas)
- Overall Offensive Performer of the year: Luis Jiménez (Cardenales de Lara)
- Rookie of the year: José Pirela (Aguilas del Zulia)
- Comeback of the year: Yusmeiro Petit (Bravos de Margarita)
- Manager of the year (Chico Carrasquel Award): Jody Davis (Aguilas del Zulia)
- Pitcher of the year (Carrao Bracho Award): Andrew Baldwin (Caribes de Anzoátegui)
- Closer of the year: Ronald Belisario (Bravos de Margarita)
- Setup of the year: Luis Ramírez (Bravos de Margarita)

== Highlights ==
- On 21 November, Navegantes del Magallanes pitcher Anthony Lerew, completed a no hit/no run game against Magallanes' nemesis Leones del Caracas. The final score was 6–0. This was the 16th no-hitter game in the history of the league, and the 12th achieved by one pitcher during the whole game.
- Caribes de Anzoátegui – one of the newer teams in the league – won their first championship after reaching the final for the second time (first one in 2003–2004); both of these finals have been against the Tigres de Aragua, team that reached its 15th final, and 8th in the last nine years.
- Caribes also managed to repeat a feat that hadn't been seen in the league since the 1988-89 tournament. That year, Águilas del Zulia just like Caribes in this tournament, managed to win the title after ending last in the previous season.
