= Balbino Fuenmayor =

Venezuelan baseball player (born 1989)

Bravos de León – No. 39
- First baseman
- Born: 26 November 1989 (age 36); Valencia, Venezuela
- Bats: Right Throws: Right
- Stats at Baseball Reference

Balbino Rafael Fuenmayor Piña (born 26 November 1989) is a Venezuelan professional baseball player for the Bravos de León of the Mexican League. He has also played in Minor League Baseball and in the Venezuelan Professional Baseball League (LVBP), primarily with the Caribes de Anzoátegui. Nicknamed "Balbineitor", Fuenmayor is a two-time Venezuelan League MVP winner, and as of 2026 holds the record for most home runs (96) by an active player in the LVBP.

== Career ==
Fuenmayor was signed as an international free agent by Toronto Blue Jays general managher J.P. Ricciardi in 2007 after a workout at Rogers Centre, with a $750,000 signing bonus. Entering the 2007 season, he was ranked the 10th best prospect for hte Blue Jays. He played two seasons in the rookie-level Gulf Coast League before making the jump to Class A Lansing in 2009. He was played with the Vancouver Canadians in 2011, helping the team with consecutive Northwest League titles in 2011 and 2012. After 26 games with Lansing in 2013, he was released by the Blue Jays.

Fuenmayor went on to play in the Frontier League, the American Association, and the Can-Am League in 2014; he was named Baseball America's Independent League Player of the Year. That performance earned him a second MLB contract with the Kansas City Royals. Fuenmayor reached the Triple-A Omaha Storm Chasers, hitting .377 in 2015 and .291 in 2016, before being released.

Signing with El Águila de Veracruz for the 2017 season of the Mexican Baseball League, Fuenmayor would go on to play with Tecolotes de los Dos Laredos (2018–2023) and the Acereros de Monclova (2024–2026) He acquired Mexican citizenship in 2022, allowing him to occupy a domestic player roster spot. He hit his 500th career RBI in the Mexican League on June 12, 2026, knocking in Juan Mora in the seventh inning against Diablos Rojos del México (after driving in David Hensley earlier in the game for number 499). He was traded to the Bravos de León on July 3, 2026.

Fuenmayor debuted with Navegantes del Magallanes in the 2009–10 LVBP season, but played only a single game with them before being traded to the Caribes de Anzoátegui. He won an MVP with Caribes in the 2021–22 season, after leading the league in RBI and coming in second in home runs; he also won the Comeback Player of the Year award, after missing the previous season due to injury. In the 2025–26 season, he won his second MVP award, leading the league in home runs and extra-base hits, and coming second in OPS and third in RBIs. He set the Caribes franchise record for most home runs in a single season, surpassing Eliézer Alfonzo.
