= Josh Kroeger =

American baseball player (born 1982)

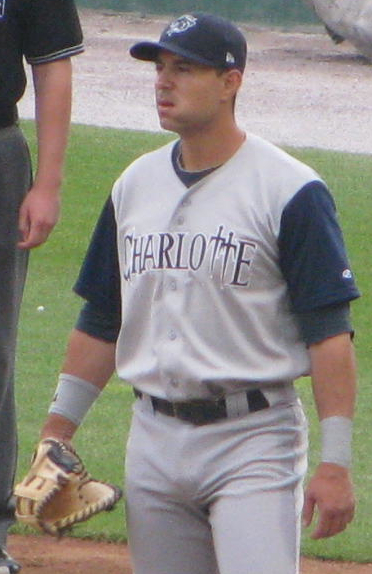
- Kroeger playing for the Charlotte Knights in 2010
- Outfielder
- Born: August 31, 1982 (age 44); Davenport, Iowa, U.S.
- Batted: Left Threw: Left

MLB debut
- September 2, 2004, for the Arizona Diamondbacks

Last MLB appearance
- October 2, 2004, for the Arizona Diamondbacks

MLB statistics
- Batting average: .167
- Home runs: 0
- Runs batted in: 2
- Stats at Baseball Reference

Teams
- Arizona Diamondbacks (2004)

Josh Kroeger
Medal record

Men's baseball

Representing United States

Baseball World Cup
Gold medal – first place	2009 Nettuno	National team

Joshua J. Kroeger (born August 31, 1982) is an American former professional baseball outfielder. He played in Major League Baseball (MLB) for the Arizona Diamondbacks in 2004. Listed at 6'3" [1.90 m], 220 pounds [104 k], Kroeger batted and threw left-handed. He was born in Davenport, Iowa.

== High school career ==
Kroeger graduated from Scripps Ranch High School in 2000, where he was named to the Third Team All-American.

== Professional career ==
Kroeger batted an average of .167 (9-for-54) with three doubles in 22 games for Arizona, including five runs scored and two RBI without home runs.

In 2008 Kroeger played for the Chicago Cubs Triple-A affiliate, the Iowa Cubs. He became a free agent at the end of the season and signed a minor league contract with the Chicago White Sox. Additionally, he played three winter ball seasons for the Leones del Caracas club of the Venezuelan Professional Baseball League, resulting champion in the 2009–10 season and being a key part in the team's regular lineup.

On November 22, 2010, Kroeger signed a minor league contract with the Florida Marlins organization. He made 82 appearances for the Triple-A New Orleans Zephyrs in 2011, batting .284/.372/.465 with 11 home runs, 56 RBI, and eight stolen bases.

In 13 minor league seasons, Kroeger hit .276 with 154 home runs and 743 RBI in 1,434 games. His most productive seasons came in Venezuela, where he was widely known as 'La Pesadilla' (The Nightmare), primarily due to his clutch hitting ability for delivering a game-winning hit or belting a home run against the opposite team, as well as for the phonetic similarity of his surname to the fictional character Freddy Krueger. Overall, he posted a .297/.401/.482 slash line with 27 homers and 128 RBI in 224 games during his five-season stint in the league.

Besides Caracas, Kroeger played with the Águilas del Zulia and Bravos de Margarita and served as a reinforcement for the Caribes de Anzoátegui in the 2010-2011 postseason, when he earned Most Valuable Player honors.
