= Rubén Amaro =

Rubén Amaro may refer to:

- Rubén Amaro Sr. (1936–2017), Major League Baseball infielder, 1958–1969
- Rubén Amaro Jr. (born 1965), Major League Baseball outfielder, 1991–1998, and Philadelphia Phillies general manager, 2008–2015
