= Estadio Metropolitano (disambiguation) =

Estadio Metropolitano is the current home stadium of Atlético Madrid, used since 2017.

Estadio Metropolitano (Metropolitan Stadium) may also refer to:

- Estadio Metropolitano Roberto Meléndez, Barranquilla, Colombia
- Estadio Metropolitano de San Cristóbal, a multi-use stadium in San Cristóbal, Venezuela
- Estadio Metropolitano de Madrid, former home stadium of Atlético Madrid, used 1923–1966
- Estadio Metropolitano de Mérida, a football stadium in Mérida, Venezuela
- Estadio Metropolitano de Techo, a multi-use stadium in Bogotá, Colombia
- Estadio Olímpico Metropolitano, a multi-purpose stadium in San Pedro Sula, Honduras
- Estadio Metropolitano Ciudad de Itagüí, a multi-use stadium in Itagüí, Colombia
- Estadio Monumental de Maturín, the largest stadium in Venezuela
- Estadio Metropolitano de Fútbol de Lara, a football stadium in Cabudare, Venezuela
- Estadio Metropolitano (Madrid Metro), a station on Line 7
