= Joe Thurston =

American baseball player (born 1979)

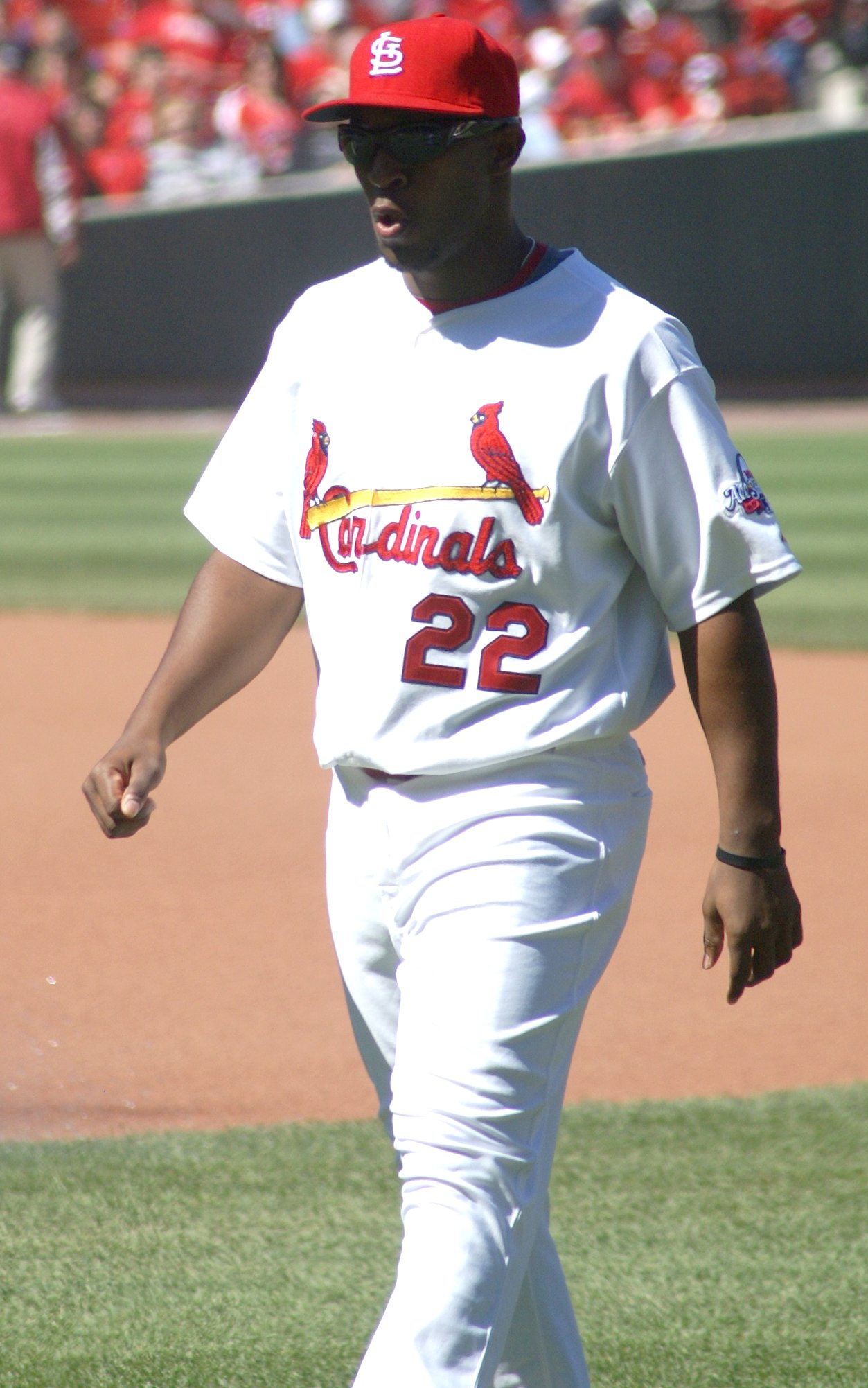
- Thurston with the St. Louis Cardinals
- Third baseman / Second baseman
- Born: September 29, 1979 (age 47); Fairfield, California, U.S.
- Batted: Left Threw: Right

MLB debut
- September 2, 2002, for the Los Angeles Dodgers

Last MLB appearance
- August 5, 2011, for the Florida Marlins

MLB statistics
- Batting average: .226
- Home runs: 1
- Runs batted in: 27
- Stats at Baseball Reference

Teams
- Los Angeles Dodgers (2002–2004); Philadelphia Phillies (2006); Boston Red Sox (2008); St. Louis Cardinals (2009); Florida Marlins (2011)
Medals
Men's baseball
Representing United States
Pan American Games
Silver medal – second place	2011 Guadalajara	National team

Joseph William Thurston (born September 29, 1979) is an American former professional baseball third baseman and second baseman. and current manager of the Mahoning Valley Scrappers. He played for the Los Angeles Dodgers, Philadelphia Phillies, Boston Red Sox, St. Louis Cardinals, and Florida Marlins in Major League Baseball (MLB).

== Amateur career ==
Thurston graduated from Vallejo High School in Vallejo, California. He was originally selected in 1997 by the Boston Red Sox in the 45th round (1,332nd overall) of the 1997 MLB draft, but did not sign with them and instead went to Sacramento City College, for which he delivered the game-winning hit to lead the Panthers to the 1999 state championship.

== Professional career ==
=== Los Angeles Dodgers ===
Thurston was drafted again in 1999, this time by the Los Angeles Dodgers in the fourth round (134th overall) of the 1999 MLB draft.

In 2001, Thurston was ranked the 9th-best prospect in the Dodgers' system after posting a .338 OBP for the Double-A Jacksonville Suns, and by 2002, few prospects appeared to have a brighter future than the 22-year-old second baseman. Playing for the Las Vegas 51s of the AAA Pacific Coast League, Thurston hit .334 with an .878 OPS and 22 stolen bases in 2002, earning him the L.A. Dodgers' Minor League Player of the Year Award and Baseball America's AAA Player of the Year honors. Thurston made his major-league debut on September 2, 2002 for the Los Angeles Dodgers, hitting .462 in eight games.

But 2002 would ultimately be the peak of Thurston's minor-league career. Returning to AAA in 2003, his OPS fell to .746, and it slipped further (to .721) in 2004. He was again a late-season call-up in 2003 and 2004, but he hit just .185 in the two seasons combined. The expectation that he would be a future star had evaporated. On July 29, 2005, the Dodgers shipped Thurston to the New York Yankees as part of a conditional deal. He played for their Triple-A team, the Columbus Clippers and was granted free agency after the season.

=== Philadelphia Phillies ===
He signed a minor-league contract with the Philadelphia Phillies on January 28, 2006. He was assigned to Triple-A Scranton/Wilkes-Barre to begin the season and his contract purchased on August 22, 2006. He would stay with the Phillies for the rest of the season and played in 18 games going 4-for-18 (.222 batting average). He was released after the season. On December 1, he signed a minor league contract with the Washington Nationals that included an invitation to spring training. He did not make the major league club and was released.

He was then once again picked up by the Philadelphia Phillies and was assigned to their Double-A team, the Reading Phillies. He played four games for the Reading Phillies before earning a callup to Triple-A Ottawa. He had his contract purchased by the big league club on July 27, 2007, after second baseman Chase Utley was placed on the disabled list. He was demoted the next day after the acquisition of Tadahito Iguchi. Thurston spent the rest of the 2007 season with Ottawa. He became a free agent after the season.

=== Boston Red Sox ===
On December 13, Thurston signed with the Boston Red Sox to a minor league contract with an invitation to spring training. On March 19, 2008, he was assigned to the minor league camp. On April 16, he was brought up to the Red Sox from Pawtucket to replace the injured Alex Cora.

=== St. Louis Cardinals ===
On April 22, 2008, Thurston was designated for assignment and subsequently played in the Puerto Rican winter league in 2008 on a team managed by Eduardo Pérez. Pérez was impressed with Thurston's versatility and thought his style of play would be a good fit with manager Tony La Russa of the St. Louis Cardinals. Perez recommended Thurston to LaRussa, and on December 16, 2008 he signed a minor league deal with the St. Louis Cardinals. He made his debut with the Cardinals on April 6, 2009 as a pinch runner. He also played third base and scored a run.

Thurston earned his first significant major league playing time as a utility player with the 2009 Cardinals. He frequently played third base before the Cardinals acquired Mark DeRosa, and also appeared at second base, in left field, and as a pinch hitter. In November 2009, Thurston was granted free agency.

=== Atlanta Braves ===
On December 18, 2009, Thurston signed a minor league contract with the Atlanta Braves. He also received an invite to spring training.

=== Florida Marlins ===
Thurston enjoyed a terrific season with Class AAA New Orleans Zephyrs in 2011. He led the team in almost every offensive category at the time of his promotion to the Marlins on August 5. After starting in a game against the Cardinals, Thurston was designated for assignment on August 6. He became a free agent at season's end.

=== Later career ===
The Houston Astros signed Thurston to a minor league contract on November 13, 2011. He also received an invitation to spring training. He was released by the Astros on March 28, 2012. Just an hour later, however, he was signed to a minor league contract with the Philadelphia Phillies. He was released by the Phillies on April 23 after batting just .207 in 11 games with the Lehigh Valley IronPigs. Thurston signed with the Minnesota Twins on April 25 and was assigned to the Rochester Red Wings. On May 14, 2012, Thurston was released by the Minnesota Twins.

Thurston played 58 games with the York Revolution of the independent Atlantic League in 2012, batting .314 with eight home runs and 28 RBI. In 2013, Thurston played 21 games with the Lancaster Barnstormers of the Atlantic League, batting .329.

On March 6, 2013, Thurston signed with the Leones de Yucatán (Yucatán Lions) in the Mexican Baseball League. Thurston later would make his debut after receiving a traveling visa.

Thurston also played for the Bravos de Margarita, Cardenales de Lara and Pastora de los Llanos clubs of the Venezuelan Professional Baseball League.

Thurston signed a minor league deal with the Milwaukee Brewers on January 25, 2014. He was released on March 27.

On March 6, 2015, Thurston signed a minor league contract with the Boston Red Sox.

== Coaching career ==
=== Boston Red Sox ===
Thurston was hired as a coach for the Portland Sea Dogs the Double-A affiliate of the Boston Red Sox for 2015.

=== Cincinnati Reds ===
On January 19, 2016, Thurston was named as the hitting coach for the Billings Mustangs, the rookie-level affiliate of the Cincinnati Reds.

=== Seattle Mariners ===
On January 16, 2017, Thurston was hired as the hitting coach for the Modesto Nuts, the Single-A affiliate of the Seattle Mariners.

Thurston was promoted to be the hitting coach of the High-A affiliate Everett AquaSox for the 2019 season.

In 2020, Thurston was the first base coach for the Seattle Mariners.

=== Philadelphia Phillies ===
Since 2022, Thurston has served as the hitting coach for the Philadelphia Phillies' Triple–A affiliate, the Lehigh Valley IronPigs.

=== Houston Astros ===
On February 10, 2025, the Houston Astros hired Thurston to serve as the hitting coach for their Triple-A affiliate, the Sugar Land Space Cowboys.

=== Mahoning Valley Scrappers ===
Thurston was hired in March 2026, to be the next manager of the Mahoning Valley Scrappers, an MLB Draft League team.

== Personal life ==
Thurston's first child was born in 2009.

== Awards and recognition ==
- 2000 – Los Angeles Dodgers Minor League Player of the Year, California League All-Star SS
- 2002 – Baseball America 2nd team Minor League All-Star 2B, Triple-A All-Star 2B, Los Angeles Dodgers Minor League Player of the Year, Pacific League All-Star 2B, AAA Player of the Year
- 2005 – Pacific Coast League All-Star 2B
- 2006 – International League All-Star 2B
- 2011 – IBAF Baseball World Cup All-Star 2B
