= Kasey Olenberger =

Italian American baseball player (born 1978)

- Pitcher
- Born: 18 March 1978 (age 47); Santa Rosa, California, U.S.
- Bats: Right Throws: Right
- Stats at Baseball Reference

Kasey Garret Olenberger (born 18 March 1978) is an American-Italian former professional baseball pitcher. Listed at 6 ft 4 in (193 cm), 243 lb (110 kg), Olenberger batted and threw right handed. He was born in Santa Rosa, California.

Olenberger went undrafted out of Long Beach State where he played college baseball. He began his professional career in 2002 with the Solano Steelheads of the independent Western League. He spent another season with Solano and two seasons with Parma in the Italian Baseball League before being signed by the Los Angeles Angels in advance of the 2005 season. His father was a scout for the Angels as of August 2004. Olenberg spent three seasons with the Triple-A Salt Lake Bees where he set a single-season team record in 2006 with 180 innings pitched. He later spent time in the farm systems of the Florida Marlins and Arizona Diamondbacks.

A member of the Italy national baseball team, Olenberger competed in the 2004 Summer Olympics, as well as in the 2006 and 2009 World Baseball Classic tournaments.

He also has pitched for the Bravos de Margarita, Cardenales de Lara and Pastora de los Llanos clubs of the Venezuelan Professional Baseball League.
