= Llaneros de Acarigua =

The Llaneros de Acarigua were a baseball club which played in the Venezuelan Professional Baseball League during the 1968–1969 season. They were managed by Alfonso Carrasquel and played its home games at the Estadio BR Julio Hernández Molina in Acarigua, Portuguesa.

The Llaneros joined the circuit as a replacement for the Industriales de Valencia. They were the worst in the six-team league, getting roughed up as a last-place club with a 23-37 record, ending 16 games out of the first place Leones del Caracas.

Between the Acarigua players who had Major League experience were Jim Hicks, Cleo James, José Martínez, Barry Raziano, Roberto Muñoz and Don O'Riley.

The team withdrew at the end of the season and be replaced by the Aguilas del Zulia in the 1969-1970 tournament.

== Sources ==
- Gutiérrez, Daniel; Alvarez, Efraim; Gutiérrez (h), Daniel (2006). La Enciclopedia del Béisbol en Venezuela. LVBP, Caracas. ISBN 980-6996-02-X
- PuraPelota.com – Llaneros de Acarigua
