= Llaneros de Portuguesa =

Venezuelan baseball club

The Llaneros de Portuguesa were a baseball club which played in the Venezuelan Professional Baseball League during the 1975–1976 season. They were managed by Jim Williams and played its home games at the Estadio BR Julio Hernández Molina in Acarigua, Portuguesa.

This team was created by the temporary merger of two VPBL teams, the Tiburones de La Guaira and the Leones del Caracas, at the end of the 1974–1975 season.

By then, the Tiburones and Leones management had a contract dispute with the Central University of Venezuela, owners of the Estadio Universitario in Caracas, which was shared by both teams. As a result, both teams moved out of Caracas and temporarily merged their operations into a single team, a curious development, since the two teams were historically bitter rivals of the fan base who settled in the same area.

Meanwhile, fans in La Guaira and Caracas cities loathed the Tibuleones nickname to identify the new squad, which is a reminiscent of the ludicrous 1914–1915 Federal League nicknames (Buf-Feds) and the National Football League (Card-Pitt) monikers during World War II conflict. The Tibuleones sobriquet derived from the Tiburones (Sharks) and Leones (Lions) words, creating a term that could be translated as Sharklions.

The team finished second with a 33-31 record, four games behind regular-season winner Cardenales de Lara, but was swept by the Tigres de Aragua, 4–0, in the first round playoff series.

After that, the Tiburones and Leones teams reached an agreement with the CUV and returned to the Estadio Universitario the following season.

== Roster ==
- Tony Armas (OF) / (BD)
- Oswaldo Blanco (1B)
- Angel Bravo (OF)
- Warren Cromartie (OF)
- Víctor Davalillo (UT)
- Baudilio Díaz (C)
- Roric Harrison (P)
- Ubaldo Heredia (P)
- Remigio Hermoso (IF)
- Enzo Hernández (SS)
- José Herrera (OF)
- Fred Holdsworth (P)
- Cliff Johnson (C)
- Ken Kravec (P)
- Steve Luebber (P)
- Robert Marcano (OF)
- Aurelio Monteagudo (P)
- Luis Salazar (3B)
- Luis Sánchez (P)
- Diego Seguí (P)
- Pablo Torrealba (P)
- César Tovar (UT)
- Manny Trillo (2B)
- Mike Willis (P)

== Sources ==
- Gutiérrez, Daniel; Alvarez, Efraim; Gutiérrez (h), Daniel (2006). La Enciclopedia del Béisbol en Venezuela. LVBP, Caracas. ISBN 980-6996-02-X
- PuraPelota.com – Llaneros de Portuguesa (Tibuleones)
- es.Wikipedia.org – Llaneros de Portuguesa
