= Estadio BR Julio Hernández Molina =

Stadium in Araure, Portuguesa, Venezuela

Coordinates: 9.5697745°N 69.2128372°W

The Estadio BR Julio Hernández Molina is a multi-use stadium located in Araure, Portuguesa, Venezuela. This stadium was inaugurated on October 25, 1967, and holds 11,000 people.

It is currently used mostly for baseball games, and previously served as the home stadium of the Llaneros de Acarigua, Llaneros de Portuguesa and Pastora de los Llanos former teams that played in the Venezuelan Professional Baseball League.
