= Caribes de Anzoátegui =

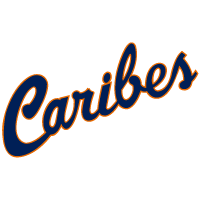
- Logo

Information
- League: Venezuelan Professional Baseball League
- Location: Puerto La Cruz, Anzoátegui
- Ballpark: Estadio Alfonso Chico Carrasquel
- Founded: July 15, 1987; 39 years ago
- League championships: 4 (2010–2011, 2014–2015, 2017–2018, 2020–2021)
- Former name: Caribes de Oriente (1991–2005)
- Manager: Asdrúbal Cabrera

Current uniforms

Caribes de Anzoátegui (Spanish pronunciation: [kaˈɾiβes ðe ansoˈateɣi]; Anzoátegui Caribs) is a baseball team in the Venezuelan Professional Baseball League based in Puerto La Cruz, in the eastern state of Anzoátegui.

== Franchise history ==
In January 1987, a local businessmen group based in Puerto la Cruz, Venezuela stated their intention to Venezuelan Professional Baseball League to pursue an expansion franchise. Finally on July 15, 1987, the franchise was founded with 21 stockholders and begun a struggle for finding a second expansion team for it was a league requirement. It was not until 1990 that the Venezuelan league awarded the Puerto la Cruz-based franchise, and the Caribes de Oriente debuted in the 1991–92 season. The team's name remained until 2005, when it changed to Caribes de Anzoátegui up to the present.

Throughout their history, the Caribes have won four titles (2010–11, 2014–15, 2017–18 and 2020–21) in seven finals (2003–04, 2010–11, 2013–14, 2014–15, 2017–18, 2019–20 and 2020–21).

On May 14, 2013, former Chicago White Sox, Detroit Tigers and Caribes de Anzoátegui player Magglio Ordoñez became a co-owner of the team.

Since the 2010–11 season, they have not missed the playoffs once, the longest such stretch in team history.

== Current roster ==
2020-21 Season Roster
Players		Coaches
Pitchers: 42 (Venezuela) José Ascanio; 73 (Venezuela) Liarvis Breto; 44 (Venezuela) Yeizo Campos; 90 (Venezuela) Yender Caramo; 15 (Mexico) Jesús Cruz; 83 (Venezuela) Angel Duno; 57 (Venezuela) Mayckol Guaipe; 59 (Venezuela) Angel Guillen; 54 (Venezuela) Dennis Herrera; 67 (Venezuela) Wilfredo Lidezma; 71 (Venezuela) Angel Lezama; 24 (Venezuela) Andrés Machado; 75 (Venezuela) Jorge Martinez; 29 (Dominican Republic) Henry Martinez; 72 (Venezuela) Jesus Martinez; 43 (Venezuela) David Martínez; 79 (Venezuela) Iván Medina; 53 (Venezuela) Oddanier Mosqueda; 68 (Venezuela) Lester Oliveros; 32 (Venezuela) Freddy Pacheco; 39 (Venezuela) Andrés Pérez; 40 (Venezuela) José Quijada; 55 (Dominican Republic) Emmanuel Ramirez; 35 (Venezuela) Jhonleider Salinas; 80 (United States) Jake Sanchez; 54 (Venezuela) Sebastian Tabata; 64 (Venezuela) Jean Toledo; 46 (Venezuela) Jaison Vilera; updated on 14 May 2021	Catchers: 16 (Venezuela) Erick Castillo; 93 (Venezuela) Gabriel Lino; 45 (Venezuela) Jesús Sucre; 23 (Venezuela) Tomás Telis; Infielders: 22 (Venezuela) Alí Castillo; 58 (Venezuela) Leandro Cedeño; 28 (Venezuela) Balbino Fuenmayor; 32 (Venezuela) Everlouis Lozada; 36 (Venezuela) Andruw Monasteiro; 49 (Venezuela) Cristhian Pedroza; 2 (Venezuela) Niuman Romero; 34 (Venezuela) Luis Sardiñas; 10 (Venezuela) César Valera; Outfielders: 31 (Venezuela) Oswaldo Arcia; 37 (Venezuela) Willians Astudillo; 12 (Venezuela) Fernando Kelli; 5 (Venezuela) Rafael Ortega; 7 (Venezuela) Herlis Rodríguez; 48 (Venezuela) Eduardo Sosa	Manager: 27 (Cuba) Mike Álvarez; 30 (Venezuela) Jackson Melián; Coaches: 27 (Cuba) Mike Álvarez(Pitching); 43 (Venezuela) Damaso Gonzalez(First Base); 15 (Venezuela) Luis Oliveros(Bench); 40 (Venezuela) Williams Oropeza(Third Base); 63 (Venezuela) Ismael Ramirez(Bullpen); 70 (Venezuela) Néstor Smith(Hitting)

== Notable players ==
- Eliezer Alfonzo
- Tony Armas
- Rafael Betancourt
- Luis González
- Jonathan Herrera
- Víctor Martínez
- José Miguel Nieves
- Magglio Ordóñez
- Tomás Pérez
- Renyel Pinto
- Carlos Silva
- Carlos Zambrano
- Rafael Ortega

== See also ==
- Caribes de Anzoátegui players
- Caribes de Oriente players

== Team's yearly record ==
30 seasons totals

Regular season	G	W	L	Place	Division	Round Robin playoff	G	W	L	Place	Final series	G	W	L	Opponent	
1991-92	60	20	40	4th	Eastern											
1992-93	60	27	33	4th	Eastern											
1993-94	60	28	32	3rd	Eastern											
1994-95	60	27	33	3rd	Eastern											
1995-96	60	27	33	3rd	Eastern											
1996-97	53	25	28	3rd	Eastern	Clinched berth	16	4	12	4th						
1997-98	64	30	34	3rd	Eastern	Clinched berth	16	7	9	4th						
1998–99	61	24	37	4th	Eastern											
1999–2000	57	32	25	1st	Eastern	Clinched berth	16	5	11	5th						
2000–01	61	26	35	3rd	Eastern											
2001-02	62	34	28	1st	Eastern	Clinched berth	16	2	14	5th						
2002-03	42	18	24	4th	Eastern	Season canceled										
2003-04	62	33	29	1st	Eastern	Clinched berth	16	10	6	1st	Clinched berth	6	2	4	Tigres de Aragua	
2004-05	61	36	25	2nd	Eastern	Clinched berth	16	8	8	3rd						
2005–06	62	32	30	3rd	Eastern	Clinched berth	16	4	12	5th						
2006-07	62	26	36	4th	Eastern											
2007–08	63	39	24	1st	No divisions	Clinched berth	16	5	11	4th						
2008–09	63	28	35	6th	No divisions											
2009–10	63	22	41	8th	No divisions											
2010–11	63	34	29	3rd	No divisions	Clinched berth	16	11	5	1st	Clinched berth	7	4	3	Tigres de Aragua	Champions
2011–12	63	33	30	2nd	No divisions	Clinched berth	17	9	8	4th						
2012–13	63	35	28	3rd	No divisions	Clinched berth	16	8	8	3rd						
2013–14	63	39	24	1st	No divisions	Clinched berth	16	10	6	2nd	Clinched berth	5	1	4	Navegantes del Magallanes	
2014-15	63	39	24	1st	No divisions	Clinched berth	16	11	5	1st	Clinched berth	5	4	1	Navegantes del Magallanes	

=== 2015-20 playoff format ===
Regular season	G	W	L	Place	1st round playoff	G	W	L	Opponent	Wild card	G	W	L	Opponent	Semi-finals	G	W	L	Opponent	Finals	G	W	L	Opponent	
2015-16	64	34	30	3rd	Clinched berth	6	2	4	Tiburones de La Guaira	Clinched berth	1	1	0	Bravos de Margarita	Clinched berth	7	3	4	Navegantes del Magallanes						
2016-17	63	34	29	2nd	Clinched berth	6	4	2	Tiburones de La Guaira	Not needed	-	-	-	-	Clinched berth	5	1	4	Águilas del Zulia						
2017-18	63	32	31	5th	Clinched berth	5	4	1	Navegantes del Magallanes	Not needed	-	-	-	-	Clinched berth	5	4	1	Leones del Caracas	Clinched berth	6	4	2	Cardenales de Lara	Champions
2018-19	63	31	32	6th	Clinched berth	6	4	2	Navegantes del Magallanes	Not needed	-	-	-	-	Clinched berth	5	1	4	Leones del Caracas						
2019-20	42	22	20	4th	Clinched berth	6	2	4	Águilas del Zulia	Clinched berth	1	1	0	Navegantes del Magallanes	Clinched berth	4	4	0	Tiburones de La Guaira	Clinched berth	7	3	4	Cardenales de Lara	

=== 2020– playoff format ===
Regular season	Division	G	W	L	Place	Semi-finals	G	W	L	Opponent	Finals	G	W	L	Opponent	
2020-21	Central	40	24	16	1st	Clinched berth	7	4	3	Navegantes del Magallanes	Clinched berth	4	4	0	Cardenales de Lara	Champions

== Retired numbers ==
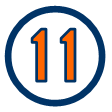
Luis
Aparicio
Retired by
all of LVBP 1984
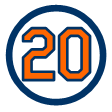
Antonio
Armas
Retired 1991
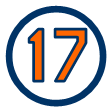
Alfonso
"Chico"
Carrasquel
Retired
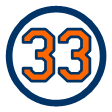
Magglio
Ordóñez
Retired January 17, 2013
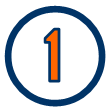
Pompeyo
Davalillo
Retired November 20, 2013

== Awards ==
Most Valuable Player (Víctor Davalillo Award):

- Magglio Ordoñez (1996–97)
- Eliezer Alfonzo (2007–08)
- Balbino Fuenmayor (2021–22)
- Balbino Fuenmayor (2025–26)

Overall Offensive Performer of the year:

- Scott Cepicky 1992–93,
- Magglio Ordoñez 1997–98,
- Eliezer Alfonzo 2007–08.

Comeback Player of the Year:

- Pedro Chávez (1992–93)
- José Francisco Malavé (2000–01)
- Alex Herrera (2005–06)
- José Castillo (2012–13)

Manager of the Year (Chico Carrasquel Award)

- Marco Davalillo (2007–08)
- Alfredo Pedrique (2012–13, 2013–14)

Carrao Bracho Trophy (Pitcher of the Year Award)

- Alex Herrera (2007–08)
- Andrew Baldwin (2010–11)
- Renyel Pinto (2011–12)

Closer of the Year

- Alex Herrera (2001–02)
- Elio Serrano (2003–04)
- Jon Hunton (2011–12)

Setup Man of the Year

- Jean Toledo (2012–13)
