= Estádio Waldomiro Pereira =

Former stadium in Brazil

Coordinates: 13.87635°S 40.08380°W

- Interactive map of Estádio Waldomiro Pereira
- Location: Patos de Minas, Minas Gerais Brazil
- Capacity: 5,000
- Surface: Grass

Tenant
- Esporte Clube Mamoré

Estádio Waldomiro Pereira was a multi-use stadium located in Patos de Minas, Brazil. It was used mostly for football matches and hosted the home matches of Esporte Clube Mamoré. The stadium had a maximum capacity of 5,000 people.

In 2006, due to financial problems, Mamoré sold the stadium area for development as a supermarket and did not play any of the state's Championship in 2007 and 2008. As part of an ambitious project, the club started the construction of a new and larger stadium outside the main part of the city, that would allow Mamoré to come back to professional games in 2009. The new venue was named the Estádio Bernardo Rubinger de Queiroz.
