= Ron Meredith =

South African water polo player

Personal information
- Nationality: South African
- Born: 26 May 1932 (age 92); Johannesburg, South Africa

Sport
- Sport: Water polo

Ron Meredith (born 26 May 1932) is a South African water polo player. He competed at the 1952 Summer Olympics and the 1960 Summer Olympics.
