= Plaza de Sol y Sombra =

Bullfighting ring in Lima, Peru

- Interactive map of Plaza de Sol y Sombra
- Address: Lima; Peru
- Coordinates: 11°49′52.69″S 77°1′40.81″W
- Type: Bullring

Construction
- Opened: 1982
- Rebuilt: 22 May 2022; 4 years ago

Plaza de Sol y Sombra is a bull ring in Lima, Peru. It is currently used for bull fighting. The stadium held 10,000 people and was built in 1982. It was announced in April 2022 that a new arena would open the following month on May 22.
