= Jeff Farnsworth =

American baseball player (born 1975)

- Pitcher
- Born: October 6, 1975 (age 50); Wichita, Kansas, U.S.
- Batted: Right Threw: Right

MLB debut
- April 3, 2002, for the Detroit Tigers

Last MLB appearance
- September 28, 2002, for the Detroit Tigers

MLB statistics
- Win–loss record: 2–3
- Earned run average: 5.79
- Strikeouts: 28

CPBL statistics
- Win–loss record: 1–2
- Earned run average: 8.10
- Strikeouts: 11
- Stats at Baseball Reference

Teams
- Detroit Tigers (2002); Sinon Bulls (2008)

Jeffrey Ellis Farnsworth (born October 6, 1975) is an American former Major League Baseball pitcher who played for the Detroit Tigers in 2002. He was born in Wichita, Kansas.

== Career ==
He was drafted by the Seattle Mariners in 1996. He remained in the Seattle farm system till 2001. He was claimed in 2002 by the Detroit Tigers through the Rule 5 draft. He spent the entire season with the Tigers, serving as their long reliever. He pitched in 70 innings for Detroit, striking out 28 while inducing 29 walks. He was outrighted after the 2002 season and spent the entire 2003 season at the Double A level. He signed a minor league deal with the Montreal Expos on January 22, 2004. He signed a minor league deal with the Milwaukee Brewers on June 1, 2004. He appeared in 11 games at the AAA level before being released. He'd jump from organizations throughout the rest of his career, last appearing for the Camden Riversharks of the Atlantic League of Professional Baseball in 2012.
