= Santos Amaro =

Cuban baseball player

- Third baseman
- Born: 14 March 1908; Cuba
- Died: 31 May 2001 (aged 93); Veracruz City, Mexico
- Batted: Right Threw: Right
- Stats at Baseball Reference

Member of the Mexican Professional

Baseball Hall of Fame
- Induction: 1977

Santos Amaro, better known as "Canguro" Amaro (14 March 1908 – 31 May 2001), was a Cuban professional baseball player who played in both the Cuban League and the Mexican League.

One of the most aggressive players in Cuban baseball, Amaro had thousands of admirers both in Cuba and Mexico. He was inducted into the Mexican Baseball Hall of Fame in 1977.

Amaro initially played at the catcher position, which was difficult for him because of his height (1.92 m, 6 ft 4 in). He then played third base, but his best position was right field, where he made good use of a strong throwing arm. He was one of the most consistent hitters that have passed through the Mexican League, playing for seventeen seasons and batting over .300 in eleven of them. When he hung up his spikes in 1955, he retired with a .314 overall average with 1,339 hits.

In 1951, he replaced Martín Dihigo as manager of the Veracruz Eagle, a team he led to the championship in 1952 and 1961.

His son Ruben Amaro, played 11 years in American Major League Baseball, and his grandson, Ruben Amaro, Jr., also played in the major leagues and was the general manager of the Philadelphia Phillies.

Amaro died on 31 May 2001 in the city of Veracruz, Mexico.
