= Ernesto Mejía =

Ernesto Mejía may refer to:

- Ernesto Mejía (footballer) (1899–1933), Spanish footballer
- Ernesto Mejía Sánchez (1923–1985), Nicaraguan author and poet
- Ernesto Mejía (baseball) (born 1985), Venezuelan former professional baseball first baseman
