= Juan Mora =

Juan Mora may refer to:

== People ==
- Juan Mora Fernández (1784-1854), Costa Rican head of state
- Juan Rafael Mora Porras (1814–1860), Costa Rican president
- Juan Mora Catlett (born 1931), Mexican film director
- Juan Luis Mora (footballer, born 1973), retired Spanish football goalkeeper
- Juan Luis Mora (footballer, born 1979), Chilean football goalkeeper

== Places ==
- Juan José Mora Municipality, Venezuelan municipality
