= Pastora de los Llanos =

Information
- League: LVBP (Western Division)
- Location: Araure/Acarigua
- Ballpark: Estadio BR Julio Hernández Molina
- Founded: 1991; 35 years ago
- Former name: Pastora de Occidente

Current uniforms
Home	Away

The Pastora de los Llanos were a baseball club which played in the Venezuelan Professional Baseball League between the 1997–98 and 2006-07 seasons. They were based in the cities of Acarigua and Araure in Portuguesa, and played its home games at Estadio BR Julio Hernández Molina in Araure.

The Pastora de los Llanos were aligned in the Western Division as a replacement for the departed Pastora de Occidente, which were based in Cabimas. In its 11 seasons, Pastora de los Llanos advanced 7 times to the playoffs, but never made it into finals. The most close they were from a final was at the 99-2000 season when they were knocked out in a tie-break game for finals 9-5 against Navegantes del Magallanes, which advanced to finals to face Aguilas del Zulia. Despite the initial success, the team would perform poorly in the next season where even they lost a game that was repeated against Magallanes because the latter protested the roster the team presented. At the next season they lost the playoff series while in 2002, the team had the worst record of the cancelled 2002-03 season; 12 wins over 27 losses in 39 games played after 1 December. At the 2003-04 season they led the Western Division but ended again knocked out in playoffs. The 2004-05 season was the last time that Pastora advanced to playoffs, as they would end knocked out on their division in the next two seasons. This, including the poor attendance to the stadium and the financial losses the team was suffering, forced the new owner to sell the team at the end of 2007.

Starting the 2007-08 season, the franchise moved to Margarita Island and was renamed Bravos de Margarita.

== Yearly team records ==
Season	Record	Finish	Manager	Notes
1997-98	34-30	2nd	Domingo Carrasquel	Lost 1st round playoff series
1998-99	25-37	4th	Domingo Carrasquel	
1999-00	36-26	1st	Luis Dorante	Lost 1st round playoff series. Tied with Navegantes del Magallanes, lost tie-break game.
2000-01	30-32	3rd	Luis Dorante	Lost 1st round playoff series
2001-02	33-28	2nd	Luis Dorante	Lost 1st round playoff series
2002-03	12-27	4th	Luis Dorante	Season suspended due to a general strike
2003-04	35-27	1st	Luis Dorante	Lost 1st round playoff series
2004-05	31-30	2nd	Luis Dorante	
2005-06	23-39	3rd	Edgar Alfonzo	
2006-07	25-37	4th	Edgar Alfonzo; Phil Regan	

== Team highlights ==
- 1997-98: Alex Cabrera and teammate Luis Raven tied with Caribes' Magglio Ordóñez for the most home runs with eight.
- 1998-99: Luis Raven led the league with 18 home runs.
- 1999-00: Alex Cabrera tied with Cardenales' Anthony Sanders for the most home runs with seven.
- 2000-01: Alex Cabrera led the league with 13 home runs.
- 2001-02: Ramón Hernández won the batting title with a .376 average.
- 2002-03: Javier Colina won the batting title with a .355 average.
- 2004-05:
  - Javier Colina led the league with 13 home runs and 51 RBIs.
  - Ricardo Palma posted the best ERA among pitchers with a 2.02 mark.

== Other players of note ==
- Brent Bowers
- Mickey Callaway
- Ramón Castro
- Chris Clapinski
- Howie Clark
- Trace Coquillette
- Jason Conti
- Mike Duvall
- Horacio Estrada
- Ramón García
- Alberto González
- Beiker Graterol
- Ryan Hawblitzel
- Maicer Izturis
- Ryan Karp
- José Lobatón
- Robert Machado
- Garry Maddox
- Rob Mackowiak
- Hensley Meulens
- Carlos Monasterios
- Miguel Montero
- Talmadge Nunnari
- Kasey Olemberger
- Luis Ordaz
- Jarrod Patterson
- Matt Perisho
- Jake Robbins
- Alex Sánchez
- Alex Serrano
- Marco Scutaro
- Scott Stewart
- Joe Thurston
- Yorvit Torrealba
- Eider Torres
- Carlos Valderrama
