= Alex Herrera =

Venezuelan baseball player (1979–2023)

- Relief pitcher
- Born: November 5, 1979; Maracaibo, Venezuela
- Died: February 16, 2023 (aged 43); Maracaibo, Venezuela
- Batted: Left Threw: Left

MLB debut
- September 13, 2002, for the Cleveland Indians

Last MLB appearance
- July 20, 2003, for the Cleveland Indians

MLB statistics
- Win–loss record: 0–0
- Earned run average: 5.11
- Strikeouts: 11

CPBL statistics
- Win–loss record: 2–3
- Earned run average: 3.45
- Strikeouts: 39
- Stats at Baseball Reference

Teams
- Cleveland Indians (2002–2003); Chinatrust Whales (2006)

Alexander José Herrera (November 5, 1979 – February 16, 2023) was a Venezuelan relief pitcher who played from 2002 to 2003 for the Cleveland Indians of Major League Baseball. Listed at 5' 11" (1.80 m), 190 lb. (86 k), Herrera batted and threw left handed.

== Career ==
Herrera was born in Maracaibo, Zulia. He was signed by Cleveland as an amateur free agent in 1997. He started his professional career in 1998 with the Caribes de Oriente club of the Venezuelan Professional Baseball League and pitched in the Indians Minor League system from 2000 through the 2002 midseason, reaching Triple-A level with the Buffalo Bisons before joining the big team in 15 Major League games as a left-handed specialist. He allowed seven runs on 10 hits and eight walks, striking out 11 batters and did not have a decision for the Indians, while recording a 9.00 ERA in 12 1/3 innings of work.

Following his four-year stint in the Cleveland organization, Herrera pitched from 2004 to 2006 for the Colorado Springs Sky Sox, Richmond Braves and Toledo Mud Hens, Triple-A affiliate teams of Colorado, Atlanta and Detroit, respectively. His most productive season came in 2001, when he posted a combined 7–0 record with five saves and a 1.32 ERA for A+ Kinston Indians and Double-A Akron Aeros.

Besides, Herrera also pitched in the Can-Am League, Italian League and Mexican League, as well as for several teams in the Venezuelan winter league through the present.

In addition, Herrera earned an All-Star Futures Game selection and also has appeared in numerous Caribbean Series.

In a 15-year career, Herrera has compiled a 57–54 record with a 4.09 ERA and 27 saves in 447 pitching appearances, including 877 strikeouts, 510 walks, 101 starts, two shutouts, and four complete games.

== Personal life and death ==
Herrera died in Maracaibo on 16 February 2023, at the age of 43.

== See also ==
- List of Major League Baseball players from Venezuela
