= Bobby Ramos =

Cuban baseball player and coach (born 1955)

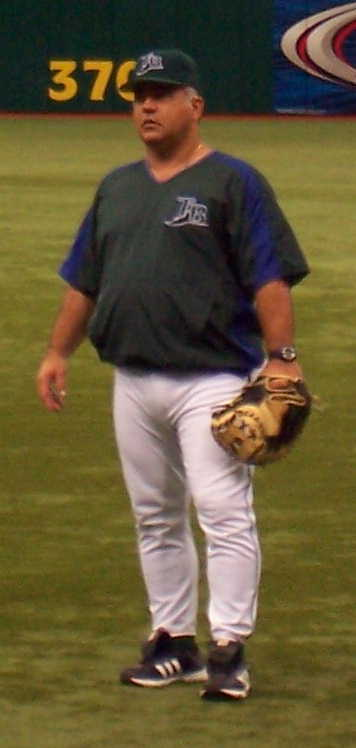
- Before the game on August 20, 2006
- Catcher/Coach
- Born: November 5, 1955 (age 69); Havana, Cuba
- Batted: Right Threw: Right

MLB debut
- September 26, 1978, for the Montreal Expos

Last MLB appearance
- September 9, 1984, for the Montreal Expos

MLB statistics
- Batting average: .190
- Home runs: 4
- Runs batted in: 17
- Stats at Baseball Reference

Teams
- Montreal Expos (1978–1981); New York Yankees (1982); Montreal Expos (1983–1984)

Roberto Ramos (born November 5, 1955) is a Cuban former professional baseball catcher who played in Major League Baseball for the Montreal Expos and the New York Yankees.

== Career ==
Ramos was a catcher. He was drafted by the Montreal Expos in the seventh round of the 1974 amateur draft and made his major league debut on September 26, 1978, in a 5–3 loss to the Philadelphia Phillies, going 0-for-1 in the game.

In 1982, Ramos was sent to the New York Yankees in exchange for fellow catcher Brad Gulden. Six months later, the Expos purchased his contract from the Yankees and Ramos found himself back in Montreal, where he finished his career. He played his final major league game on September 9, 1984, again against the Phillies, and was released by the Expos on March 28, 1985.

In between, Ramos played winter ball with the Cardenales de Lara, Águilas del Zulia and Navegantes del Magallanes clubs of the Venezuelan League during eight seasons spanning 1976–1987. He was catcher for the Gold Coast Suns of the Senior Professional Baseball Association in its inaugural season of 1989.

Afterwards, Ramos served as a manager in the Houston Astros and Tampa Bay Devil Rays Minor League systems from 1993 to 1999.

Ramos then spent three seasons as bullpen coach for the Anaheim Angels between 2000 and 2002, and worked in the same capacity with the Devil Rays from 2006 through 2011.

In 2011, the Florida Marlins hired Ramos as their Latin American player development coordinator.

Sporting positions
Preceded by Joe Coleman	Anaheim Angels Bullpen Coach; 2000–2002	Succeeded by Orlando Mercado
Preceded by Matt Sinatro	Tampa Bay Devil Rays Bullpen Coach; 2006–2011	Succeeded by Stan Boroski
