= Rubén Amaro Sr. =

Mexican baseball player (1936–2017)

- Shortstop
- Born: January 6, 1936; Veracruz, Veracruz, Mexico
- Died: March 31, 2017 (aged 81); Weston, Florida, U.S.
- Batted: Right Threw: Right

MLB debut
- June 29, 1958, for the St. Louis Cardinals

Last MLB appearance
- August 27, 1969, for the California Angels

MLB statistics
- Batting average: .234
- Home runs: 8
- Runs batted in: 156
- Stats at Baseball Reference

Teams
- St. Louis Cardinals (1958); Philadelphia Phillies (1960–1965); New York Yankees (1966–1968); California Angels (1969)

Career highlights and awards
- Gold Glove Award (1964)

Member of the Mexican Professional

Baseball Hall of Fame
- Induction: 1986
Medals
Men's baseball
Representing Mexico
Central American and Caribbean Games
Silver medal – second place	1954 Mexico City	Team

Rubén Amaro Mora (January 6, 1936 – March 31, 2017) was a Mexican professional baseball player. He played as a shortstop and first baseman in Major League Baseball from 1958 through 1969.

After his playing career, Amaro managed extensively with the Águilas del Zulia of the Venezuelan League; his number 36 was retired by Zulia in 2013. He was inducted into the Mexican Professional Baseball Hall of Fame in 1986, joining his father, Santos Amaro.

== Career ==
Amaro played on the Mexico national baseball team at the 1953 Amateur World Series.

He finished 21st in voting for the 1964 National League Most Valuable Player for playing in 129 games and having 299 at-bats, 31 runs, 79 hits, 11 doubles, 4 home runs, 34 runs batted in, 16 walks, a .264 batting average, a .307 on-base percentage, and a .341 slugging percentage.

Shortly after joining the New York Yankees, Amaro suffered a knee ligament injury in a collision with left fielder Tom Tresh. The injury limited Amaro to just 14 games in 1966.

== Personal life ==
Amaro's father, Santos, was Cuban and played as an outfielder in the Mexican League. His mother Josefina Mora was from Mexico.

His son, Rubén Jr., was an outfielder in Major League Baseball in the 1990s and served as the General Manager of the Philadelphia Phillies from 2009 to 2015. Amaro's son, Luis, also played briefly for the Philadelphia Phillies in minor league baseball, and is currently the General Manager of the Aguilas del Zulia baseball team in the Venezuelan Professional Baseball League. He also has a son David Amaro and a daughter Alayna Amaro.

Amaro served as a member of the board of the Baseball Assistance Team, a 501(c)(3) non-profit organization dedicated to helping former Major League, Minor League, and Negro league players through financial and medical hardships.

== Death ==
Amaro died on March 31, 2017, of natural causes.

== In popular culture ==
His son, Rubén Amaro Jr., portrayed him on two episodes (S5E11 and S6E6) of The Goldbergs, an ABC series which is set in the 1980s. His son attended William Penn Charter School, the same school as TV and film producer Adam F. Goldberg, on whose adolescence the show is based.

== See also ==
- List of members of the Mexican Professional Baseball Hall of Fame
- List of second-generation Major League Baseball players
