= Leonel Carrión =

Venezuelan baseball coach (born 1952)

- Coach
- Born: February 15, 1952 (age 74); Maracaibo, Venezuela
- Bats: Right Throws: Right

Teams
- Montreal Expos (1987–1988)

Member of the Venezuelan

Baseball Hall of Fame
- Induction: 2015

Leonel Carrión Santiago (born February 15, 1952) is a Venezuelan former Major League Baseball coach who served on the staff of manager Buck Rodgers of the Montreal Expos in 1987 and 1988.

== Career ==
Born in Maracaibo, he was also a minor league outfielder who spent 12 seasons (1972–1983) in the Expo organization before becoming a professional coach in 1984. He threw and batted right-handed, stood 5 feet 11 inches (1.80 m) tall and weighed 175 pounds (79 kg).

Carrión entered professional baseball after graduating from Liceo Udón Pérez in Maracaibo. His active career included more than 1,300 games played, all but 241 of them at the Double-A or Triple-A level. In his finest year, 1974, with the West Palm Beach Expos, he batted a career-best .304 in 105 games and was named a Florida State League all-star. He also stole 41 bases in 1976 as a member of the Québec Métros.

As part of his duties with the 1988 Expos, Carrión worked with former shortstop Hubie Brooks, a 1987 All-Star, to convert him into an outfielder.
