= José Malavé =

Venezuelan baseball player (born 1971)

- Outfielder
- Born: May 31, 1971 (age 55); Cumaná, Sucre, Venezuela
- Batted: Right Threw: Right

MLB debut
- May 23, 1996, for the Boston Red Sox

Last MLB appearance
- August 30, 1997, for the Boston Red Sox

MLB statistics
- Batting average: .226
- Home runs: 4
- Runs batted in: 17

NPB statistics
- Batting average: .218
- Home runs: 1
- Runs batted in: 12
- Stats at Baseball Reference

Teams
- Boston Red Sox (1996–1997); Yokohama BayStars (1998)

José Francisco Malavé [mah-lah-VEY] (born May 31, 1971) is a Venezuelan former professional baseball outfielder who played from 1996 to 1997 with the Boston Red Sox. He was born in Cumaná, Sucre.

== Career ==
In parts of two seasons in Major League Baseball, Malavé was a .226 hitter with four home runs and 17 RBI in 45 career games.

Besides, he played professional baseball in Italy, Japan, Mexico, South Korea and Venezuela.

Malavé also served as third base coach for the Venezuela national baseball team in the 2009 World Baseball Classic.

== See also ==
- List of Major League Baseball players from Venezuela
