= José Bracho =

- Pitcher
- Born: July 23, 1928; Maracaibo, Zulia, Venezuela
- Died: June 16, 2011 (aged 82); Los Puertos de Altagracia, Zulia
- Batted: Right Threw: Right

Career highlights and awards
- Caribbean Baseball Hall of Fame (2001); Venezuelan Baseball Hall of Fame and Museum (2003); Carrao Bracho Trophy (1985)

Member of the Venezuelan

Baseball Hall of Fame
- Induction: 2003
Medals
Men's baseball
Representing Venezuela
Latin American Series
Silver medal – second place	1952 Caracas	Team

José de la Trinidad Bracho (July 23, 1928 – June 16, 2011) was a Venezuelan professional baseball pitcher. Listed at 6' 1", 185 lb., he batted and threw right handed. His friends and fans affectionately called him Carrao ("crying bird"), a moniker that he used throughout his life. Born in Maracaibo, Zulia, Bracho has been considered one of the best pitchers in Venezuelan baseball history.

Bracho spent 26 years in the Venezuelan Professional Baseball League, played four minor leagues seasons, hurled in the Dominican Winter League, and appeared in six Caribbean Series, setting an all-time pitching mark in this tournament. Notably, forty years after his retirement in 1973, Bracho still owns the all-time records in the Venezuelan league for the most wins (109), complete games (91), strikeouts (859) and innings pitched (1,769 2/3), and still owns the record for the most wins in a single-season, while collecting 15 in the 1961–1962 season.

== Career ==
=== Venezuelan league ===
A sinking fastball specialist, Bracho made his debut as a 20-year-old rookie with the Caracas team in the 1948–1949 season, playing for them during ten seasons, while helping the team to clinch four championship titles in 1948-49, 1951–52, 1952–53 and 1956-57. He also played for the Pastora (1953–54) and Magallanes (1954-55) champion teams before joining Oriente/Orientales (1959-60 through 1963-64). He then returned to Magallanes (1964–65), and later formed part of La Guaira (1964–67) and Lara (1966-68), ending his career with his home team Zulia (1970–73).

His most productive campaign came in the 1961–1962 season for Oriente, when he posted a 15-5 record with 97 strikeouts and a 2.25 earned run average in 160 innings pitched, leading the league both in wins and innings. During that season he formed part of a solid one-two rotation along Bob Gibson, who went 7-10 with a 2.54 ERA and topped the league with 134 strikeouts in 142 innings.

In a 23-year career, Bracho had a 109-90 record and a 3.17 ERA in 370 pitching appearances (195 starts), giving up 624 earned runs on 1626 hits and 618 walks while striking out 859 in 1,769 2/3 of work.

=== Minor leagues ===
In addition to his career in Venezuela, Bracho pitched in the Texas League with the San Antonio Missions (1952) and Houston Buffaloes (1954), as well as for the Toronto Maple Leafs (1952) and Havana Sugar Kings (1955-1956) of the International League. He registered a combined record of 18-19 and a 3.22 ERA in 71 games (40 starts).

=== Caribbean Series ===
Bracho was very solid in six Caribbean Series, while appearing in the 1949, 1951, 1952, 1953, 1955 and 1958 tournaments.

In 12 pitching appearances, he went 6–3 with a 2.15 ERA and five complete games in 71.0 innings of work. His six victories ties him with Rubén Gómez and Camilo Pascual for the most all-time wins in the Series.

He was also a productive hitter, batting an average of .393 (11-for-28) and slugging .464, while scoring two runs with six runs batted in.

== Awards and recognitions ==
Bracho was inducted into the Caribbean Baseball Hall of Fame in 2001. Two years later, he gained induction into the Venezuelan Baseball Hall of Fame and Museum as part of their first class.

Since the 1985–1986 season, the VPBL honors annually the best pitcher in the league with the Carrao Bracho Trophy.
