= Johnny Paredes =

Venezuelan baseball player (1962–2020)

- Second baseman
- Born: September 2, 1962; Maracaibo, Venezuela
- Died: November 5, 2020 (aged 58); Maracaibo, Venezuela
- Batted: Right Threw: Right

Professional debut
- MLB: April 29, 1988, for the Montreal Expos
- NPB: July 24, 1992, for the Yakult Swallows

Last appearance
- MLB: October 6, 1991, for the Detroit Tigers
- NPB: October 26, 1992, for the Yakult Swallows

MLB statistics
- Batting average: .211
- Home runs: 1
- Runs batted in: 11

NPB statistics
- Batting average: .242
- Home runs: 3
- Runs batted in: 12
- Stats at Baseball Reference

Teams
- Montreal Expos (1988, 1990); Detroit Tigers (1990–1991); Yakult Swallows (1992)

Johnny Alfonso Paredes Isambert (September 2, 1962 – November 5, 2020) was a Venezuelan second baseman in Major League Baseball (MLB),

== Career ==
He played for the Montreal Expos (1988; 1990) and Detroit Tigers (1990–1991). He also played in Japan in 1992 for the Yakult Swallows. Listed at 5' 11", 165 lb., he batted and threw right-handed. He also played with Aguilas del Zulia of the Venezuelan Professional Baseball League (LVBP) between 1982 and 1993.

In a three-year career in the Majors, Paredes was a .211 hitter with one home run and 11 RBI in 60 games. Paredes died on November 5, 2020, at the age of 58 of a cancer related illness.

== See also ==
- List of Major League Baseball players from Venezuela
