= Águilas del Zulia =

Logo	Cap insignia

Information
- League: Venezuelan Professional Baseball League
- Location: Maracaibo, Zulia
- Ballpark: Estadio Luis Aparicio El Grande
- Founded: 1969
- Caribbean World Series championships: (2) 1984, 1989
- League championships: (6) 1984, 1989, 1992, 1993, 2000, 2017

Current uniforms
Home	Away

Águilas del Zulia (English: Zulia Eagles) is a Venezuelan professional baseball team based in Maracaibo which plays in the Venezuelan Professional Baseball League.

== History ==
The team was founded in 1969 and debuted in the 1969–70 season. The franchise began in 1937 as Sabios de Vargas, then was renamed Santa Marta BBC in 1954, before moving to Valencia and playing as the Industriales de Valencia from 1955 to 1956 through 1967–68. The Industriales later moved to Acarigua and were renamed Llaneros de Acarigua for the 1968–69 season.

After the collapse of the Liga Occidental de Béisbol Profesional in 1963, the Zulia state was left without a professional baseball team. In the following years there were many efforts to bring baseball back to the state, but the efforts were not realized until 1969, when the Águilas del Zulia joined the Venezuelan Professional Baseball League. Two baseball people were behind the formation of the team, Luis Rodolfo Machado B., main shareholder of the extinct Centauros de Maracaibo club, and Juan Antonio Yanes, former Patriotas de Venezuela owner.

Machado found a group of local investors to buy the aforementioned Llaneros de Acarigua when the team folded after their only season in the VPBL. By then the Acarigua team was put up for sale by its owners after losing money for numerous years, including the hazardous Valencia Industriales experience. Among the investors were Simón Bromberg, Rubén Darío Barboza, Gabriel Fernández, Edgardo Fuenmayor Arrieta, Guillermo Echeto La Roche, Sixto Márquez, José Trinidad Martínez, Douglas Mavárez Granadillo, Ernesto Montiel, Fernando Pérez Amado, Vinicio Pineda Gil, Alberto Plumacher, Antonio Quintero Parra, Lucas Rincón Colmenares, Heberto Rutilio Ríos, and Hugo Suárez Romero.

After receiving the approval of the VPBL President Franklin White and from the five other teams, the franchise was formally acquired by Machado's group. The team was bought for a sum of 400,000 million bolivars. The news of the return of professional baseball to the state was celebrated in Zulia.

The team made its official debut on October 14, 1969, at Estadio Antonio Herrera Gutiérrez against the Cardenales de Lara. The Águilas lost the game, 3–2, with Juan Quiroz pitching a complete game loss, while Pablo Torrealba was credited with the win and Ken Sanders earned the save. On the following day the team played and won its first game at Estadio Luis Aparicio El Grande.

The Aguilas' first years were troubled while posting losing records in most seasons. Nevertheless, the team survived these lean years to become one of the most successful VPBL teams in the early 1980s, winning five championship titles spanning 1984–2000, and two Caribbean Series (1984 and 1989).

== The Águilas ==
The team's name of the Águilas (Eagles) is associated with the Zuliano region. It is said to be attributed to the Father Jose Manuel Ríos. In 1968, during a baseball game at Estadio Alejandro Borges in Maracaibo, Machado had asked Ríos if he had any suggestions for a baseball team's name, as he had just bought the Llaneros de Portuguesa. According to Machado, Ríos saw the label of the then popular Cerveza Zulia (Zulia beer) – whose bottle's label carried a blue eagle on a yellow background – and said that the Águilas would be a good name for the team. In addition, Ríos explained the Governmental Palace in Maracaibo is called El de las Águilas (The Place of the Eagles), and that many national flags and coats of arms have eagles on them. Thus, the team's name became the Águilas.

== 2006–2007 season ==
For the first time in five seasons the team qualified to the post-season, managed by former major league catcher John Russell. The performances of the rookie sensation and Arizona Diamondbacks outfield prospect Carlos González, led this rookie-filled team to a successful year, finishing second in the western division and third in the playoff race to the finals.

Foreign pitchers Chris Begg, Heath Totten and Jeremy Cummings were the heads of the pitching rotation, while the offensive was commanded by an MVP season by González, solid catching work of Humberto Quintero, and the performances of Juan Pablo Camacho, Orlando Muñoz and Luis Bolívar, who was named Rookie of the Year.

Reliever Richard Garcés reached his 100th save in the league, which inspired his rookie pitcher teammates, while another Aguilas' legend, former pitcher Wilson Álvarez, joined the team as their bullpen coach.

== Championships ==
Season	Manager	Record	Series score	Runner-up
1983–84	Rubén Amaro Sr.	40-25	4–1	Cardenales de Lara
1988–89	Pete Mackanin	35-25	4–3	Tigres de Aragua
1991–92	Pompeyo Davalillo	38-22	4–3	Tigres de Aragua
1992–93	Pompeyo Davalillo	32-28	4–0	Navegantes del Magallanes
1999–2000	Marc Bombard	35-27	4–1	Navegantes del Magallanes
2016–17	Lipso Nava	33-30	4–1	Cardenales de Lara
Total championships			6	

== Current roster ==
Aguilas del Zulia Week 8 Roster
Players		Coaches
Pitchers: 64 (Venezuela) Edgar Alfonzo; 54 (Venezuela) Elvis Araújo; 46 (Venezuela) Wilfredo Boscán; 38 (Venezuela) Francisco Butto; 35 (Dominican Republic) Edgar De La Rosa; 62 (Dominican Republic) Julio DePaula; 60 (Dominican Republic) Logan Durán; 21 (United States) Trevor Frank; 59 (Venezuela) Ramón García; 72 (Venezuela) Jesús Martínez; 40 (Curaçao) Shairon Martis; 74 (Venezuela) Anderson Muñoz; 48 (Venezuela) Alexis Rivero; 16 (Cuba) Reiner Roibal; 67 (Venezuela) Danny Rondón; 75 (Venezuela) Rómulo Sánchez; Roster updated on 28 November 2017	Catchers: 26 (Venezuela) Jesús Flores; 08 (Venezuela) José Herrera; Infielders: 22 (Venezuela) Ali Castillo; 03 (Venezuela) Bryant Flete; 05 (Venezuela) José Flores; 80 (Venezuela) Héctor Giménez; 13 (Venezuela) Yeltsin Gudiño; 65 (Venezuela) Jairo Pérez; 53 (Colombia) Reynaldo Rodríguez; 44 (Puerto Rico) David Vidal; Outfielders: 58 (Venezuela) Eleardo Cabrera; 32 (United States) Carlos Moncrief; 37 (Venezuela) Herlis Rodríguez; 10 (Venezuela) Alex Romero	Manager: -- (Venezuela) Lipso Nava; Coaches: -- (Venezuela) Wilson Álvarez (Pitching); -- (Venezuela) Lino Connell (Hitting); -- (Venezuela) Álvaro Espinoza (Bench); -- (Venezuela) Guillermo Larreal (Bullpen); -- (Venezuela) Rainer Olmedo (First Base); -- (Venezuela) Nestor Rojas (Third Base)

== Retired numbers ==
11; Luis Aparicio Montiel; SS; Retired 1984	20; Leonel Carrión; OF; Retired 1999	36; Rubén Amaro; Manager; Retired 2013	1 Pompeyo Davalillo; Manager; Retired 2014	47; Wilson Álvarez; Pitcher; Retired 2016

== Franchise leaders ==
These are records of players with the best performance in distinct statistical categories during their career with the Águilas del Zulia.

=== Batting ===
Statistic	Player	Record	Ref.
Batting average	Alí Castillo	.330	
Runs	Leonel Carrión	369	
Hits	Leonel Carrión	732	
Doubles	Leonel Carrión	118	
Triples	José Pirela	30	
Home runs	Ernesto Mejía	57	
Runs batted in	Leonel Carrión	333	
Stolen bases	José Leiva	151	

=== Pitching ===
Statistic	Player	Record	Ref.
Games pitched	Julio Machado	308	
Complete games	Mike Scott	20	
Games in relief	José Solarte	289	
Wins	Julio Machado	35	
Saves	Silvino Bracho	61	
Innings pitched	Julio Machado	572 1/3	
Earned run average	Wilson Álvarez	2.44	
Strikeouts	Julio Machado	411	

== Notable players ==
- Eduardo Acosta
- Porfirio Altamirano
- Wilson Álvarez
- Rubén Amaro, Jr.
- Luis Aparicio
- Jay Baller
- Mike Bielecki
- Dick Billings
- Larry Biittner
- Derek Botelho
- Carrao Bracho
- Juan Bustabad
- Leo Cárdenas
- Pedro Castellano
- Cristóbal Colón
- Joe Crawford
- Steve Cummings
- Bob Dernier
- Brandon Duckworth
- Mike Easler
- Terry Francona
- Oscar Gamble
- Gene Garber
- Richard Garcés
- Joe Girardi
- Ed Glynn
- Carlos González
- Geremi González
- Tom Grieve
- César Gutiérrez
- Toby Harrah
- Ed Herrmann
- Pete Incaviglia
- Bart Johnson
- Julio Machado
- Greg Maddux & Mike Maddux
- Buck Martinez
- Carlos May
- Bill Melton
- Jim Morrison
- Ben Oglivie
- Johnny Paredes
- Gerardo Parra
- Eduardo Pérez
- Greg Pryor
- Carlos Quintana
- Roberto Ramos
- Dan Rohn
- Cookie Rojas
- Jimmy Rollins
- Ryne Sandberg
- Scott Sanderson
- Mike Scott
- Lonnie Smith
- Phil Stephenson
- Dave Stewart
- Don Stanhouse
- Jim Sundberg
- Mike Tauchman
- César Tovar
- Manny Trillo
- Pat Venditte
- Dan Warthen
- Frank White
- Walt Williams
- Eduardo Zambrano

== Managers ==
- Bill Adair
- Rubén Amaro, Sr.
- Luis Aparicio
- Luis Aparicio, Sr.
- Greg Biagini
- Dick Billings
- Marc Bombard
- Chico Carrasquel
- Ron Clark
- Pompeyo Davalillo
- Jody Davis
- Larry Doby
- Gustavo Gil
- Enrique Izquierdo
- Pete Mackanin
- Jackie Moore
- Omer Muñoz
- Eddie Pérez
- Leo Posada
- Cookie Rojas
- Tony Taylor
- Manny Trillo
- Bobby Wine

== People and personalities around the organization ==
- Luis Rodolfo Machado Bohórquez: "Founding father" of Aguilas del Zulia.
- Lilia Silva de Machado: Wife of Luis Rodolfo Machado Bohórquez and honorary president of Aguilas del Zulia.
- Antonio Quintero Parra: A businessman in Zulia. Helped fund the foundation of the club.
- Lucas Rincón Colmenares: A Zulia businessman who became president of the team and was later a scout for the Philadelphia Phillies and Montreal Expos.
- Ernesto Montiel: Club director and fan who was instrumental in founding the team.
- Luis Rodolfo Machado Silva: President and general manager of the 1999–2000 championship team. He led the modernization and restructuring of the team.
- Ruperto Machado Silva: General manage of the team for four Venezuelan championships and two Caribbean World Series He led the team for more than 10 years. When he died in 1995, he was replaced by his brother Luis Rodolfo.
- Rubén Amaro Mora: Spent 11 seasons in the Major Leagues. He was born in Mexico. His father was the legendary Cuban player Santos Amaro. His son followed him into the major leagues. Married to club co-owner Lilia Machado, Amaro has served as a manager, general manager, scout, and club president. He has served the club for more than 20 years. Currently, his son, Rubén, Jr. is the first base coach for the Boston Red Sox. The Amaros have had a relationship with the club in Zulia for more than 25 years.
- Jorge Miquilena: Served as a bat boy in both the Venezuelan Western League and the Venezuelan major league. He is the only person who has been affiliated with the club since it was founded.
- Luis Verde: Sportswriter and historian. He was a player, manager, executive and umpire before beginning his career as a sportswriter. He wrote La historia del Béisbol en el Zulia which is considered the bible of baseball in the Zulia state. The 2006–2007 baseball season in Venezuela, will be played on his memory and the season carries his name.
- Arturo Celestino Alvarez: Nicknamed "El Premier" (The First). Considered the best broadcaster in Maracaibo. He called games for Aguilas del Zulia until his death in 1986. His most famous phrase was "The restaurant is now open..." He is remembered with much affection in Maracaibo and Zulia. He was also an executive for the Lara Cardinals.
- "El Ventarrón" Oscar García: A broadcaster on both radio and television. He also recorded the history of the club.
- Néstor López: For many years López worked with Arturo Celestino Alvarez to call games for Zulia. He was dedicated to advancing baseball in Zulia all his life.
- Antonio Nuñez Rovira: A noted official in the Venezuelan League in Maracaibo. He kept statistics and the history of the Aguilas.
- Leandro Núñez Cruz: The son of a baseball official, he was witness to many notable events in Maracaibo.
- Gerardo Quintero: The voice of the Aguilas for more than thirty years. He also called major league baseball games on local television. He died in 2002.
- Emiro Díaz Peña: Called many games on local television and is a respected figure in baseball.
- Elbano Castro Pimentel: One of the premier sportswriters in the region. He frequently comments on the state of Venezuelan baseball.
- Leonte Landino Jr.: A sportswriter and a baseball television journalist who spent several seasons with the club. He created and hosted the syndicated television program Aguilas...A la Carga which contributed greatly to the history of the club on television on both the local and national levels. He was influential in moving local baseball coverage onto cable television and FM radio. He has called many games in the major leagues, worked for the Tampa Bay Devil Rays and currently works for ESPN International in the United States. He is an active member of the Society for American Baseball Research (SABR).
- Antonio "Toñito" Soler: Young analyst for the radio network. One of the first writers to rely on the interpretation of statistics. Also one of the commentators on baseball on Venezuelan television.
- Manuel Hernández: Actor. Became an icon of the club giving life to "Agui", the fat eagle team mascot and the most recognized in Venezuelan baseball. He has been invited in the Caribbean Series and has received offers to be a mascot in United States and Japan.
- J.J. Villasmil: A professor of statistics at the University of Zulia. He has utilized the ideas of economics in baseball. He has also been an executive and commentator on the league. He has one of the finest collections of local baseball memorabilia.
- La Esquina Caliente: A group of fans for more than 30 years who have become experts on statistics and history. They sit in a section on the third base line.
- Johan Urdaneta: Calls games on local radio.
- Pepe Delgado Rivero: Known for his historic baseball and basketball broadcast in national television. He became famous working for Radio Caracas TV. He has a particular and well known style of calling strikeouts.
- Rodney Calderón: Modernized the scouting system which has led many players to the major leagues. He was a scout for the Texas Rangers and founded their baseball academy.

== Sources ==
- Águilas en la Historia (in Spanish)
