= Estadio Metropolitano de San Cristóbal =

Coordinates: 8.55655°N 71.216858°W

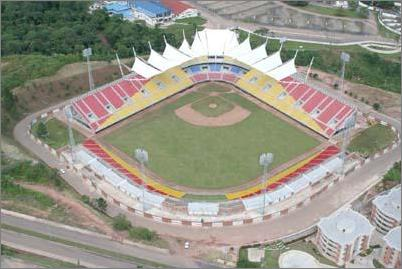
The stadium in 2006

Estadio Metropolitano is a multi-use stadium in San Cristóbal, Venezuela. It is currently used mostly for baseball games. The stadium holds 22,000 people.
