= List of people with given name Joseph =

This is a list of people named Joseph.

== People ==
=== Biblical figures ===
- Joseph (Genesis), son of Jacob in the Hebrew Bible book of Genesis
- Saint Joseph, husband of Mary, the mother of Jesus
- Joseph of Arimathea, secret disciple of Jesus
- Joseph Barsabbas, one of two candidates to replace Judas Iscariot's position among the Twelve Apostles
- Joseph ben Caiaphas, the Jewish high priest related to the crucifixion of Jesus. Only written as 'Caiaphas' in the New Testament.

=== Royalty ===
- Austria
  - Joseph I, Holy Roman Emperor
  - Joseph II of Austria
  - Franz Joseph I of Austria
  - Archduke Joseph August of Austria
  - Archduke Joseph Ferdinand of Austria
- Portugal
  - Joseph I of Portugal, King of Portugal
  - Joseph, Prince of Brazil
  - Joseph, General Inquisitor (1720–1801) – a natural son of King John V of Portugal, one of the Children of Palhavã.
- Spain/Italy/France
  - Joseph Bonaparte, King of Spain, King of Naples and Spain
- Bavaria
  - Maximilian III Joseph, Elector of Bavaria
  - Maximilian I Joseph of Bavaria, King of Bavaria
- Other
  - Joseph (Khazar), king of the Khazars during the 950s and 960s
  - Chief Joseph (1840–1904), Nez Perce tribal leader

=== A ===
- Joseph "Jo" Abbott (1840–1908), U.S. congressman from Texas
- John Joseph Abercrombie (1798–1877), career U.S. Army officer
- Joseph Ackabee (1895–1973), Ojibwe veteran of World War I.
- Joseph Albrier, French painter
- Joseph "Doc" Alexander, American NFL football player and coach
- Joe Alwyn, British actor
- Joseph Arthur Ankrah (1915–1992), 2nd president of Ghana from 1966 to 1969
- Joseph Anoa'i, Samoan-American wrestler
- Joseph Armone (1917–1992), American mobster

=== B ===
- Joseph von Baader (1763–1835), German engineer and rail transport pioneer
- Joseph Ayo Babalola, Nigerian religious figure
- Joseph F. Baca (born 1936), chief justice of the New Mexico Supreme Court
- Joseph Baldi (1941–2009), American serial killer
- Joseph D. "Joe" Ball (1896–1938), American murderer and suspected serial killer
- Joseph Barbera, American cartoonist
- Joseph Barboza (1932–1976), American hitman
- Joseph Beam (1954–1988), African-American gay rights activist and writer
- Joseph Belmont (1947–2022), Seychellois politician
- Joseph Bertolozzi (born 1959), American composer
- Joseph Beuys, German artist
- Joseph Robinette "Joe" Biden (born 1942), 46th president of the United States (2021–2025); 47th vice president of the United States (2009–2017); U.S. senator from Delaware (1973–2009)
- Joseph "Beau" Robinette Biden (1969–2015), American lawyer, soldier and politician, son of Joe Biden
- Joseph Bitangcol, Filipino actor
- Joseph Tetsuro Bizinger, known online as The Anime Man, Japanese Australian YouTuber, voice actor, songwriter, and podcaster
- Joseph Emerson Brown, Georgian-born American Lawyer, governor, and secessionist
- Joseph Brodsky, Russian and American poet and essayist
- Joseph Burnett (1931–2020), American racing driver
- Joe Burrow, American football player
- Joey Buttafuoco (born 1956), American man who had an affair with 17 year-old Amy Fisher
- Jos Buttler, English cricketer

=== C ===
- Joseph Antony Cafazzo, Canadian engineer, educator and researcher
- Joseph Caillaux (1863–1944), French politician and Minister of France
- Joseph Campbell, American writer and professor
- Joseph Campisi, American mobster
- Joseph Carraro (born 1944), former New Mexico state senator
- Joseph Chamberlain (1836–1914), British statesman, diplomats, and businessman
- Joseph Vijay Chandrasekhar, Indian politician, former actor and singer, also 90th chief minister of Tamil Nadu
- Joseph Charlton (born 1997), American football player
- Joseph Cherorot, Kenyan MP
- Joe Choynski, American boxer
- Joseph Christopher (1955–1993), American serial killer
- Joseph Civello, American mobster
- Joe Clancy, American football player
- Joseph W. Coker (1930–2019), American politician
- Harry Connick, Jr. (Joseph Harry Fowler Connick, Jr.), American singer, actor and pianist
- Joseph Connors, American art historian
- Joseph Conrad, Polish-British writer
- Joseph Cook (1860–1947), 6th prime minister of Australia
- Joseph Cotten, American actor
- Joseph Force Crater (fl. 1889–1930), New York judge who disappeared

=== D ===
- Joseph Danks (born 1962), American spree/serial killer
- Joseph James DeAngelo (born 1945), American serial killer and rapist and former cop
- Joseph Delaney (1945–2022), English author
- Joseph Dempsie, British actor
- Joseph Dennie, American writer
- Joseph Daye, Australian footballer
- Joe Dickerson, American soccer referee
- Joe DiMaggio, American baseball player
- Joe Dolan, Irish showband singer
- Joseph Dudley (1647–1720), British military commander and colonial administrator
- Joseph Edward Duncan (1963–2021), American serial killer, rapist, and kidnapper

=== E ===
- Joseph Eisele (1834–1868), German serial killer
- Joseph Else (1874–1955), British sculptor
- Joseph W. Esherick, American historian of China
- Joseph Estrada (born 1937), 13th president of the Philippines
- Joe Exotic (born 1963), American media personality convicted of animal abuse and conspiring murder for hire

=== F ===
- Joseph Fenton, informer killed by the Provisional Irish Republican Army
- Joseph Peter Moraes Fernando, also known as Premnath Moraes (1923–1998), Sri Lankan Tamil actor, film director and screenwriter
- Joseph Filardi (born 2007), American football and lacrosse player
- Joseph Fitzgerald (disambiguation), multiple people
- Joseph Flores (born 1999), American singer and songwriter known as TEMPOREX
- Joseph Peter de Fonseka (1897–1948), Sri Lankan essayist and editor
- Joseph Fourier (1768–1830), French mathematician and physicist
- Joseph Paul Franklin (1950–2013), American serial killer and neo-Nazi
- Joe Frazier, American boxer

=== G ===
- Joseph Galletta, American politician
- Joseph M.L. Gardner (1970–2008), American murderer
- Joe Garagiola, American baseball player and broadcaster
- Joseph Garrett (born 1990), known online as stampylonghead, British YouTube personality
- Joseph Jean Auguste Gay (1865–1938), French anarchist and acrobat
- Joseph Gelfer, British researcher in religion and masculinities
- Joseph Glidden (1813–1906), inventor of barbed wire
- Joseph Isaac Gnanamuttu (died 1944), Sri Lankan Tamil politician
- Joseph Goebbels (1897–1945), German politician and propaganda minister of Nazi Germany
- Joseph Goldwasser (1919–1971), Polish-born American businessman
- Joe Gomez (footballer), English footballer
- Joseph Gordon-Levitt, American actor
- Joseph Görres (1776–1848), German writer, philosopher, and theologian
- Joseph A. Greene, state senator in South Carolina

=== H ===
- Joseph Hagan, American politician
- Joseph Hagerty, American gymnast
- Joseph Hahn, American musician
- Joe Hawley, American singer, songwriter, and musician
- Joe Hart, English football player
- Joseph Haydn, Austrian composer
- Joseph Hedley, English quilter and murder victim
- Joseph Heller, American author
- Joseph Hemphill (1770–1842), U.S. congressman from Pennsylvania
- Joseph Turner Henderson, known as Joe "Mr Piano" Henderson (1920–1980), Scottish pianist, composer and broadcaster
- Joseph Hillström (1879–1915), Swedish-American labour activist and songwriter
- Joseph Chan Ho-lim, Under Secretary for Financial Services and the Treasury, and a former member of the Central and Western District Council (Peak Constituency) in Hong Kong
- Joseph Stephen Holt (1947–2014), American posthumously linked murderer and possible serial killer
- Joseph Dalton Hooker, British botanist
- Joe Horlen, American baseball player
- Joseph Howland (1834–1886), American general, politician, and philanthropist

=== I ===
- Joseph Iannuzzi (1931–2015), American mobster and FBI informant, Mafia.

=== J ===
- Joe Jacobi, American canoer
- Joe Jacobson, Welsh soccer player
- Joe Jonas, lead vocals, the Jonas Brothers
- Joseph Coulon de Jumonville (1718–1754), French Canadian military officer
- Joseph Eggleston Johnston, Virginian-born Confederate general, formerly quartermaster general of the United States Army, railway commissioners, and politicians
- Joseph Jonah-Ajonye (born 2006), American football player

=== K ===
- Joseph Kabila (born 1971), 4th president of the Democratic Republic of the Congo
- Joseph Kabui (1954–2008), first president of the Autonomous Region of Bougainville
- Joseph Kaiser, Canadian opera singer
- Jusuf Kalla (born 1942), 10th vice president of Indonesia (2004–2009); 12th vice president of Indonesia (2014–2019)
- Joseph Kallinger (1935–1996), American serial killer and rapist
- Joe Kaminer, South African rugby player
- Joe Katchik, American football player
- Joe Keeble, American football player
- Joe Kehoskie (born 1973), American baseball executive
- Joseph P. Kennedy Sr. (1888–1969), American businessman, financier and politician
- Joseph P. Kennedy II (born 1952), oldest son of Senator and Attorney General Robert F. Kennedy and former congressman from Massachusetts
- Joe Kennedy III (born 1980), son of Joseph P. Kennedy II and former congressman from Massachusetts
- Joe Kennedy (Georgia politician) (1930–1997), American politician from Georgia
- Joseph Abu Khalil (1925–2019), Lebanese politician and journalist
- Joseph Kibweteere (born 1932, disappeared 2000), Ugandan cult leader
- Joseph Thomas Knott Jr. (born 1926), American politician
- Joseph Thomas Knott III (born 1951), American lawyer
- Joseph Kondro (1959–2012), American murderer and possible serial killer
- Joseph Koo, Hong Kong composer and arranger
- Joey Kramer, Aerosmith drummer

=== L ===
- Joseph-Louis Lagrange (1736–1813) Italian-French mathematician, physicist and astronomer
- Joe Lamas, American football player
- Joe Lieberman (1942–2024), U.S. senator from Connecticut
- Joseph Loake, British racing driver
- Joseph Louis Barrow, American boxer and heavyweight champion better known as "Joe Louis"
- Joseph Lyons (1879–1939), 10th prime minister of Australia

=== M ===
- Joseph B. MacInnis (born 1937), Canadian physician, underwater diver and author
- Joseph Macmanus (born 1953), American diplomat
- Joseph Magaletti (1950–2015), American murderer and suspected serial killer
- Joe Magidsohn, Russian, American football player
- Joseph de Maistre (1753–1821), Franco-Piedmontese diplomat and philosopher
- Joseph Makilap, Kenyan MP
- Joseph Di Mambro (1924–1994), French cult leader
- Joseph Manjack (born 2002), American football player
- Joseph L. Mankiewicz, American film director, producer and screenwriter
- Joseph Marcello, Italian-American mobster
- Joseph Marco, Filipino actor
- Joseph Marwa (boxer), Tanzanian boxer
- Joseph Massino (1943–2023), former boss of Bonanno crime family
- Joe Mauer, American baseball player
- Joseph May, British-born Canadian-American actor
- Joseph Mawle, British actor
- Joseph Mazzello, American actor
- Joseph Carlisle McAlhany (1915–2005), American politician
- Joseph McCarthy (1908–1957), U.S. senator from Wisconsin
- Joe McElderry, British singer and winner of The X Factor
- Joe McGlone (1896–1963), American football player
- Joseph Mengele (1911–1979), Nazi scientist
- Joseph Henry Mensah (1928–2018), Ghanaian economist and politician
- Joseph Mercado, Filipino statistician
- Joseph Carey Merrick, the "Elephant Man"
- Joseph F. Merrill, American Latter-day Saint apostle
- Joseph Robert Miller (born 1955), American serial killer
- Joe Minucci (born 1981), American football player
- Joe Montana, American Hall of Fame NFL quarterback
- Joseph P. Moran (1895–1934), American surgeon and gangster
- Joseph S. Murphy (1933–1998), American political scientist and university administrator

=== N ===
- Joseph P. Nadeau (born 1936), justice of the New Hampshire Supreme Court
- Joe Namath (born 1943), American Hall of Fame NFL quarterback
- Joseph Nafisa (1978–2004), Indian actress and VJ
- Joseph Naso (born 1934), American serial killer
- Joseph L. Nellis, Washington attorney involved in various government investigations into organized crime in America
- Joseph Nevels, also known as JSPH, singer/songwriter
- Joseph Nicéphore Niépce (1765–1833), first person to create a permanent photograph
- Joseph Noteboom (born 1995), American football player
- Joseph Nye (1937–2025), American political scientist

=== O ===
- Joseph Odom (born 1992), American professional baseball catcher
- Joseph Bennet Odunton (1920–2004), Ghanaian civil servant
- Joseph Desmond O'Connor (1919–1998), British linguist
- Joseph Oliver (disambiguation), multiple people
- Joe O'Malley, American football player
- Joseph Oosting, Dutch football player

=== P ===
- Joseph C. Painter (1840–1911), American politician
- Joe Pasquale, winner of the 4th series of I'm a Celebrity... Get Me Out Of Here!
- Joseph Paulo, New Zealand rugby player
- Joe Paterno, Penn State football coach
- Joe Pavelski (born 1984), American ice hockey player
- Joseph Scott Pemberton, a US Marine lance corporal convicted of the homicide of Jennifer Laude, a Filipino trans woman
- Joseph Michael Perera (1941–2023), Sri Lankan politician
- Joe Perry, Aerosmith lead guitarist
- Joe Pesci, American actor
- Joseph (Petrovykh) (1872–1937), metropolitan of the Russian Orthodox Church
- Joe Picker (born 1987), Australian rugby player
- Joseph Pickett, American painter
- Joseph Yuvaraj Pillay (born 1934), Singaporean civil servant
- Joseph Planta (1744–1828), Swiss principal librarian of the British Museum
- Joseph Planta (1787–1847), English politician
- Joseph Plunkett (1887–1916), Irish Republican and Poet
- Joseph Polchinski, theoretical physicist and string theorist
- Joseph Ponniah, 1st Bishop of the Roman Catholic Diocese of Batticaloa
- Joseph Prince, a pastor and IT consultant
- Joe Prokop (born 1960), American football player
- Joe Prokop (halfback) (1921–1995), American football player

=== Q ===
- Joseph Quarles
- Joseph Querard
- Joseph Quesada
- Joseph Quesnel
- Joseph Quesnot
- Joseph Quest
- Joseph Quezada
- Joseph Quiah
- Joseph Quick (multiple people)
- Joseph Quinn (multiple people)

=== R ===
- Joe Ranft, American screenwriter, animator, storyboard artist and voice actor
- Joseph Ratzinger, given name of Pope Benedict XVI
- Joe Righetti (born 1947), American football player
- Joseph Lionel Christie Rodrigo (1895–1972), Sri Lankan Sinhala professor of Classics
- Joe Root, a 19th-century American naturalist from Erie, Pennsylvania
- Joe Root, English cricketer
- Joseph Rosenzweig, (c.1891–?), American New York City labor racketeer
- Joe Ruby (1933–2020), American cartoonist and producer

=== S ===
- Joseph Safra (1938–2020), Brazilian banker
- Joseph Sarvananthan, Sri Lankan Tamil Anglican priest
- Joe Sasto, American chef
- Joe Satriani, instrumental rock guitarist
- Joseph Scates (born 2000), American football player
- Joe Schilling, American kick-boxer
- Joseph "Beppo" Schmid (1901–1956), Air force general in Nazi Germany
- Joseph Schooling (born 1995), Singaporean swimmer
- Joseph Shuster (1914–1992), Canadian-American comic artist, best known for creating Superman
- Joseph Simmons, aka DJ Run, of rap group Run-DMC
- Joseph Simmons (guitarist), American guitarist
- Joseph Hill Sinex (1819–1892), Pennsylvania State Representative
- Joseph "Chip" Skowron (born c.1969), American portfolio manager convicted of insider trading
- Joseph Smith, founder of the Latter Day Saint movement
- Joseph Smith III, son of Joseph Smith and founder of the Reorganized Church of Jesus Christ of Latter Day Saints
- Joseph F. Smith, 6th president of The Church of Jesus Christ of Latter-day Saints
- Joseph Fielding Smith, 10th president of The Church of Jesus Christ of Latter-day Saints
- Joseph Stalin (1878–1953), General Secretary of the Communist Party of the Soviet Union, 1922–1953
- Joe Stringfellow (1918–1992), American football player
- Joe Strummer, English musician
- Joe Sugg, British YouTuber

=== T ===
- Joseph Tapine (born 1994), New Zealand rugby league player
- Joseph Thornton (1808–1891), English bookseller based in Oxford
- Joseph Ture Jr. (born 1951), American serial killer, kidnapper, and burglar

=== V ===
- Warnakulasuriya Patabendige Ushantha Joseph Chaminda Vaas (born 1974), Sri Lankan cricketer
- Joseph Valtellini (born 1985), Canadian kickboxer
- Joseph of Vatopedi (1921–2009), Greek Cypriot Orthodox monk
- Joseph Vijay (born 1974), Indian guitarist
- Joseph Vaz, Indian Catholic priest, "Apostle of Sri Lanka"
- Joseph Vidal (1933–2020), French politician
- Joe Vetrano (1918–1995), American football player
- Joe Vodicka, American football player

=== W ===
- Joseph Wapasha (c. 1816–1876), Mdewakanton Sioux chief
- Joseph Wallace (1989–1993), American murder victim
- Joseph T. Wesbecker (1942–1989), American mass murderer who perpetrated the Standard Gravure shooting
- Joss Whedon, American screenwriter, director and producer
- Joseph Wilf (1925–2016), Polish-born American businessman
- Joe Winkler (1922–2001), American football player
- Joseph B. Wirthlin, American Latter-day Saint apostle
- Joseph Wiseman (1918–2009), Canadian actor

=== Y ===
- Joseph Angell Young, American Latter-day Saint apostle

=== Z ===
- Joseph Zappala (born 1933), American businessman and diplomat
- John Joseph Frederick Otto Zardetti (1847–1902), Swiss prelate
- Joseph Zarelli (born 1961), American politician from Washington state
- Joseph Zaretzki (1900–1981), American politician
- Joseph Zaritsky (1891–1985), Israeli painter
- Joseph Zatzman (1912–2017), Canadian politician
- Joseph Carmine Zavatt (1900–1985), American judge
- Joseph Christian Freiherr von Zedlitz (1790–1862), Austrian dramatist and epic poet
- Joseph Zedner (1804–1871), German Jewish bibliographer and librarian
- Joseph Zema (born 1994), Australian gridiron football player
- Joseph Zen (born 1932), Chinese Catholic prelate
- Joseph Zerafa (born 1988), Maltese footballer
- Joseph Zerilli (1897–1977), Italian-American crime boss
- Joseph Zito (born 1946), American film director
- Joseph Zobel (1915–2006), Martiniquai writer
- Joseph Gerhard Zuccarini (1797–1848), German botanist
- Joseph Zuken (1912–1986), Canadian communist politician
- Joseph Zullo (born 1985), American politician
- Joseph Mukasa Zuza (1955–2015), Roman Catholic bishop

== Fictional characters ==
- Joseph (Centuria), fictional worker and family man in the Japanese web manga Centuria
- Joseph Desaulniers, playable Hunter in the asymmetrical horror game Identity V
- Joseph Joestar (ジョセフ・ジョースター), the main protagonist of Battle Tendency in the manga series JoJo's Bizarre Adventure
- Joseph "Joey Peeps" Peparelli, on The Sopranos
- Joseph Seed, in the Far Cry video game franchise
- Joseph "Proposition Joe" Stewart, on The Wire
- Joey Tribbiani, in the television series Friends and its spin-off Joey
