= Dragones =

Dragones may refer to:

- Dragones, Salta, Argentina
- Dragones, Havana, a ward of Centro Habana, Havana, Cuba
- Dragones de Ciudad Trujillo, a former baseball team in the Dominican Republic

== See also ==
- Dragon (disambiguation)
- Dragoness (disambiguation)
