= Graterol =

Graterol is a Spanish surname of Italian origin. It originates from the Venetian conquistador Francisco de Graterol (originally Francesco Graterolo).

People with the surname include:

- Beiker Graterol (born 1974), Venezuelan baseball player
- Brusdar Graterol (born 1998), Venezuelan baseball player
- Joel Graterol (born 1997), Venezuelan footballer
- Juan Graterol (born 1989), Venezuelan baseball player
- Luis Graterol Caraballo (born 1965), Venezuelan politician
- Windi Graterol (born 1986), Venezuelan basketball player
