= Burrulote Rodríguez =

Dominican baseball manager (1902–1964)

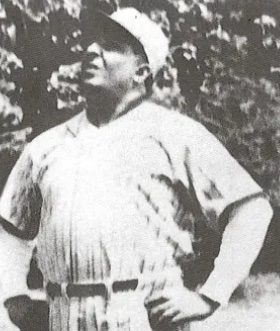
- Outfielder / manager
- Born: July 11, 1902; Santo Domingo, Dominican Republic
- Died: December 1, 1964 (aged 62); Santiago de los Caballeros, Dominican Republic
Medals
Men's baseball
Manager for Dominican Republic
Amateur World Series
Silver medal – second place	1942 Havana	Team
Bronze medal – third place	1943 Havana	Team
Central American and Caribbean Games
Silver medal – second place	1946 Barranquilla	Team

Luis Ernesto Rodríguez Abreu (July 11, 1902 – December 1, 1964), known by his nickname Burrulote ("Big Donkey"), was a baseball player and manager who was prominent in the early years of baseball in the Dominican Republic.

== Playing career ==
Rodríguez debuted at the age of 16 in the Dominican amateur leagues, distinguishing himself as a pitcher, outfielder and first baseman with the "Combate" team at the Plaza Colombina and with the "Gigantes" of the storied Gimnasio Escolar. He made his professional debut with the Tigres del Licey 1922, where he played as an outfielder and catcher. He won two championships with the team as a professional, in 1924 and 1929. In total, he played four professional campaigns with Licey.

== Managerial career ==
In January 1937, Rodríguez was part of a group that organized the famous 1937 tournament, featuring for the first time teams from the country's major cities of Santo Domingo (where Licey and Escogido played), San Pedro de Macorís (the Estrellas Orientales), and Santiago de los Caballeros (Águilas Cibaeñas); the Santo Domingo teams would be merged to form the Dragones de Ciudad Trujillo, a superteam composed of the best Dominican baseball stars and American players from Negro league baseball. Partway through the 1937 season, he was appointed manager of Ciudad Trujillo, leading them to an 11–4 record down the stretch. (Note: Lázaro Salazar, often cited as the team's player-manager, in reality held the role of team captain, while Rodríguez (along with José A. Sabino and Hostos Fiallo) managed the team.)

Rodríguez was named manager of the Dominican Republic national baseball team that participated in the 1941 Amateur World Series in Havana, Cuba; the team finished 5–3. He returned to skipper the Dominicans at the 1942 Amateur World Series, where he found himself at the center of a brawl that derailed the Oct. 11 game between the Dominican Republic and the United States; because of the tight race between Cuba and the Dominican Republic, Rodríguez and the Dominicans had been heckled by the Cuban fans all game. When a ball thrown from the American dugout accidentally struck him in the back, he assumed it had been thrown by the crowd and retaliated by throwing the ball and a bat at them. Dozens of people rushed onto the field and charged at Burrolote and the Dominican players. Dominican dictator Rafael Trujillo reportedly ordered the immediate withdrawal of the Dominican team, but the situation was eventually alleviated and the Dominicans continued to play (though the Americans made a hasty withdrawal). Despite the chaos, the Dominican Republic finished 9–3, good enough for the silver medal. Rodríguez again managed the Dominican Republic at the 1943 tournament; in a reduced field of four teams, the Dominican squad finished third.

He was once again tapped to lead the Dominican squad that played at the 1946 Central American and Caribbean Games, held in Barranquilla. Rodríguez managed the team to a second place finish, behind hosts Colombia.

Rodríguez was an active manager of amateur baseball on the island, managing the Cerveceros del Presidente ("Presidente Brewers") club in the early 1940s, "Columbia" in 1944, and "Guerra y Marina" in 1947. Starting in 1948, he led the Azua club to a series of amateur baseball titles. In his later years, he served on the board of directors of the Águilas Cibaeñas with the return of professionalism in 1951. Rodríguez was inducted into the Dominican Sports Hall of Fame in 1965.
