= Perucho =

Perucho may refer to:

== People ==
- Perucho Figueredo (1818 – 1870), Cuban poet, composer and revolutionary
- Pedro González González (1893 – 1940), Spanish politician
- Artur Perucho Badia (1902 – 1956), Spanish journalist
- Pedro Cepeda (1905 – 1955), Puerto Rican baseball player
- Pedro Petrone (1905 – 1964), Uruguayan footballer
- Joan Perucho (1920 – 2003), Spanish writer
- Pedro Rincón Gutiérrez (1923 – 2004), Venezuelan doctor, academic and politician
- Perucho Conde (born 1934), Venezuelan comedian
- Manuel Perucho (born 1948), Spanish scientist
- Carlos Pérez (kayaker) (born 1979), Spanish sprint canoer

== Places ==
- Perucho, Quito, parish in Quito, Ecuador
