= Baseball in the Dominican Republic =

- Country: Dominican Republic
- Governing body: FEDOBE
- National team: Dominican Republic
- First played: late-19th century

Club competitions
- Dominican Professional Baseball League; Dominican Summer League

International competitions
- World Baseball Classic

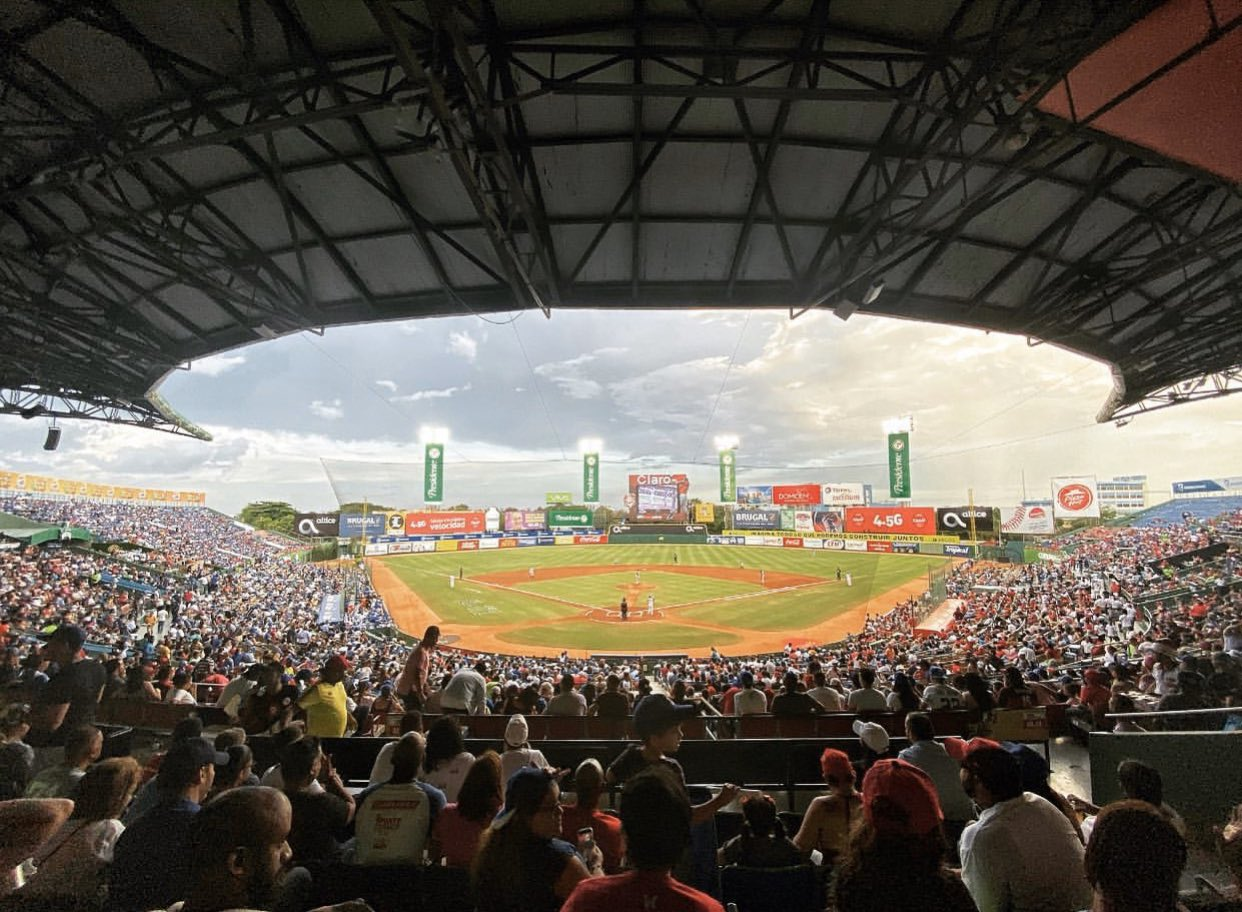
A view of the Estadio Quisqueya in Santo Domingo

Baseball is, by a wide margin, the most popular sport in the Dominican Republic. It was introduced in the late-19th century in the city of San Pedro de Macorís by Cuban immigrants.

The Dominican Republic is home to the Dominican Professional Baseball League, or La Liga de Béisbol Profesional de la República Dominicana (LIDOM) in Spanish, and the Dominican Summer League, a Major League Baseball-run academy league.

After the United States, the Dominican Republic has the second-highest number of baseball players in Major League Baseball (MLB). The Dominican Republic national baseball team has won the Baseball World Cup in 1948 and the World Baseball Classic in 2013.

== History ==
During the 1870s, many Cuban citizens fled Cuba because of the Ten Years' War. Many relocated to the Dominican Republic, bringing with them the sport of baseball. The nation's expert class was established in 1890. The first clubs were Ozama and Nuevo. On 7 November 1907, the Licey club was established in Santo Domingo. By the 1930s, it had developed into a major source for gifted players whose guardians frequently worked at sugar refineries. After Rafael Trujillo became president in 1931, he renamed the capital city of Santo Domingo to "Ciudad de Trujillo" and founded the Dragones de Ciudad Trujillo (Trujillo City Dragons). In an effort to showcase his team's superiority, he recruited internationally.

In 1937, Negro league stars from the United States including Satchel Paige, catcher Cool Papa Bell, and outfielder Josh Gibson came to the Dominican Republic in pursuit of higher salaries amidst MLB segregation rules. After Jackie Robinson broke the Major League Baseball color barrier in 1947, the league began scouting Dominican players. The first Dominican MLB player was utility infielder Ozzie Virgil, who made his Major League Baseball debut in 1956.

Professional baseball leagues in the Dominican Republic historically operated in the summer until 1955, when the league's season was moved to winter and established as the Dominican Professional Baseball League (LIDOM). Since then, the league has attracted many top players from the major leagues. Beginning in the 1955 season, the country's international presence grew, attracting global attention.

In the mid-1950s Rafael Trujillo built the main stadium. On August 29, 2025, Omairy Guzmán became the first female umpire in a game in the Dominican Republic Professional Baseball League; she was the third base umpire in a game between the Mineros de Bonao and the Atléticos de Puerto Plata.

== League structure ==
The Dominican Republic's Professional Baseball League, LIDOM by its acronym in Spanish, hosts yearly winter games across the country. It consists of 6 teams, and it is the highest level of professional baseball played in the Dominican Republic. The Dominican Summer League is a Major League Baseball-run league in which the Dominican Republic's top prospects go head-to-head in an effort to stand out to MLB scouts.

== Impact ==
Not only did baseball help strengthen the Dominican Republic's relationship with the United States, but it also had a massive effect on the culture of the Dominican Republic as a whole. Nowadays, baseball symbolizes a dream and hope for a better future for aspiring athletes and helps unite baseball fans (old and new) across several Spanish-speaking countries. The rise of baseball in the Dominican Republic has also had a massive impact on the economy of the country as a whole, generating around $1 billion per year via training facilities and professional games.

As of 2015 opening day, Dominicans were 83 of Major League Baseball's 868 players. At the beginning of the 2016 season, no country other than the United States contributed as many.

== Championships ==
Each winter at the end of the Dominican Professional Baseball League season, the top two teams face off following a round robin tournament at their home stadiums. This has been a major cultural event in the Dominican Republic, drawing in thousands of eager fans. Find more information on the winners of these playoff games in the table below:

=== Titles by team ===
Team	Titles	Runners-up	Years Champion	Years Runner-up
Tigres del Licey	24 (2)	15 (1)	1951, 1953, 1958–59, 1963–64, 1969–70, 1970–71, 1972–73, 1973–74, 1976–77, 1979–80, 1982–83, 1983–84, 1984–85, 1990–91, 1993–94, 1998–99, 2001–02, 2003–04, 2005–06, 2008–09, 2013–14, 2016–17, 2022–23, 2023–24 (1924, 1929)	1952, 1954, 1956–57, 1971–72, 1975–76, 1977–78, 1985–86, 1988–89, 1997–98, 2004–05, 2006–07, 2007–08, 2015–16,2017–2018, 2019–2020 (1922)
Águilas Cibaeñas	22	18 (2)	1952, 1964–65, 1966–67, 1971–72, 1974–75, 1975–76, 1977–78, 1978–79, 1985–86, 1986–87, 1992–93, 1995–96, 1996–97, 1997–98, 1999–00, 2000–01, 2002–03, 2004–05, 2006–07, 2007–08, 2017–2018, 2020–21	1953, 1955–56, 1960–61, 1963–64, 1969–70, 1973–74, 1976–77, 1980–81, 1982–83, 1983–84, 1989–90, 1993–94, 1994–95, 2001–02, 2005–06, 2011–12, 2012–13, 2016–17 (1936, 1937)
Leones del Escogido	16 (1)	13 (2)	1955–56, 1956–57, 1957–58, 1959–60, 1960–61, 1968–69, 1980–81, 1981–82, 1987–88, 1988–89, 1989–90, 1991–92, 2009–10, 2011–12, 2012–13, 2015–16 (1922)	1951, 1958–59, 1964–65, 1966–67, 1967–68, 1970–71, 1978–79, 1990–91, 1996–97, 1998–99, 2000–01, 2002–03, 2013–14 (1924, 1929)
Estrellas Orientales	3 (1)	14	1954, 1967–68, 2018–19 (1936)	1957–58, 1959–60, 1968–69, 1972–73, 1974–75, 1979–80, 1981–82, 1986–87, 1987–88, 1991–92, 1995–96, 1999–00, 2010–11, 2014–15
Toros del Este	3	3	1994–95, 2010–11, 2019–20	1984–85, 1992–93, 2018–19
Gigantes del Cibao	2	4	2014–15, 2021–22	2003–04, 2008–09, 2009–10, 2020–21
Dragones de Ciudad Trujillo	0 (1)	0	(1937)

== Baseball academies ==
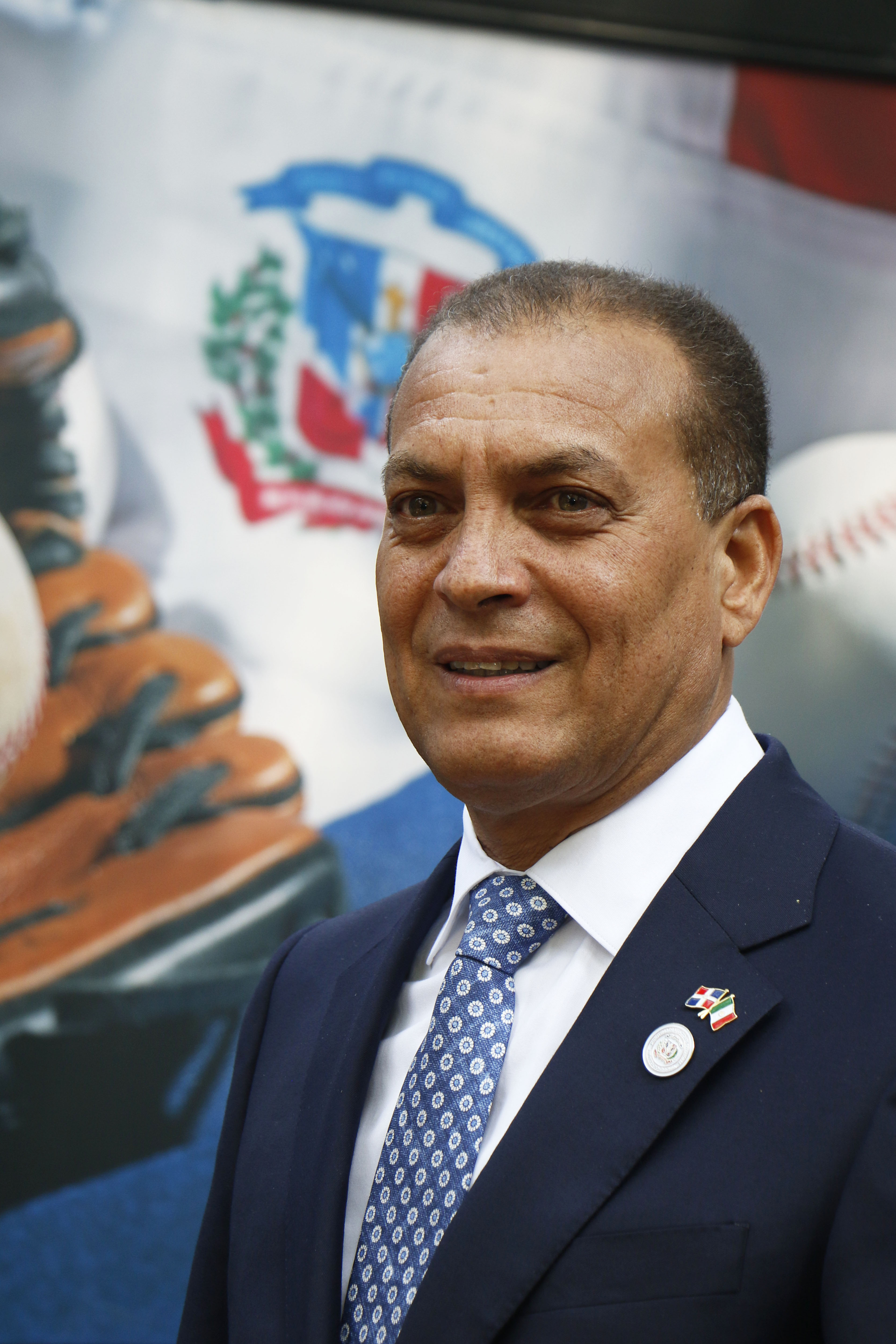
Dominican Republic ambassador Jonny de Jesús Martínez showcasing baseball culture

Baseball academies are how Major League Baseball recruiters develop the talent they find across all Latin America. In 1987, the Los Angeles Dodgers were the first MLB club to establish a baseball academy in the Dominican Republic when they opened the doors to Campo Las Palmas. Now, every single one of the teams in the MLB has a baseball academy in the Dominican Republic.

With four out of every ten Dominicans living in poverty, baseball has become a small beacon of hope for many Dominican families. The baseball academies in the Dominican Republic offer many young boys what may be their and their family's only chance of overcoming poverty, and as a result many boys as young as age 10 drop out of school to focus all of their attention on baseball and someday playing for an MLB team.

These kids often work with local agents called "buscones," who act as legal counselors, coaches and facilitators until they reach 17, the minimum age to sign an MLB contract, at which point they receive a percentage of the players' signing bonus. These relationships have frequently been documented as exploitative, as there have been cases where buscones seek to capitalize on their investment by means including administration of performance-enhancing substances without consent, age fabrication, and identity fraud. It is estimated that only two percent of Dominican recruits are actually able to make a living playing in MLB, leaving many of these young recruits finding themselves aged 19–21 with no education, no work skills, and no job prospects. Joe Kehoskie, a former baseball agent, described the situation in the 2001 PBS documentary, Stealing Home:

Unfortunately, here in the Dominican, a lot of the time kids just quit school at 10, 11, 12 and play baseball full-time. It’s great for the kids who make it because they become superstars and [make] millions of dollars in the big leagues. But for 98 kids out of a hundred, it results in a kid who is 18, 19 with no education. So it’s kind of a win-lose here in the Dominican.

Because of this, many baseball academies in the country have made efforts to incorporate educational programs that teach English and financial skills to their recruits, to better prepare them for potential Major League Baseball careers in the United States. The Arizona Diamondbacks' baseball academy, ran by former major league player Junior Noboa, is committed to helping their players complete at least their high school education, even if they are released from their team. Additionally, non-profit religious organizations in the Dominican Republic invest in communities based on reported needs by providing free baseball academies with academic achievement requirements.

The relationship between U.S. baseball academies in the Dominican Republic and their athletes has been criticized for its neocolonial and exploitative tendencies since education in academies is often tailored to assimilation into U.S. culture despite a minuscule percentage of athletes who sign MLB contracts.

== Notables ==
The list of notable names continues to grow each year and includes some major history-making players including: Juan Marichal, Felipe Alou, Bartolo Colón, Tony Fernandez and others. Some more recent and recognizable, Major League Baseball names include:

=== Pedro Martínez ===
Pedro Martínez, from Manoguayabo, was a Major League Baseball player from 1992 to 2009. He played for five teams and was best known for his tenure with the Boston Red Sox, joining with Ortiz to help them win the World Series in 2004. From 2002 to 2006, Martínez held the league record for the highest career winning percentage by a pitcher. He won three Cy Young Awards and was the first Latin American pitcher to achieve at least 300 strikeouts in a season and 3,000 in a career. Martínez reached the 3,000 strikeout mark in fewer pitches than any pitcher other than Randy Johnson. Martínez was the only pitcher to acquire 3,000 strikeouts with fewer than 3,000 innings pitched.

Martínez became a U.S. citizen in April 2006. He was elected to the Hall of Fame in 2015.

=== Sammy Sosa ===
Sammy Sosa was born on 12 November 1968 in San Pedro de Macorís. Sosa was a slugger and had his best years while he played for the Chicago Cubs. Sosa influenced many Dominicans and is best known for his record-breaking season in which he hit 61 home runs. He is a member of the Chicago Cubs Hall of Fame and is ranked ninth on the MLB all-time home-runs list.

=== David Ortiz ===
David Ortiz arrived in MLB in 1997, experiencing injuries that slowed his progress. Ortiz signed with the Boston Red Sox in 2003 but did not play much until he became their designated hitter later that year. In 2004, Ortiz became known globally for his achievements. During the 2004 season, he hit 41 home runs and had 139 RBIs while batting .301. He joined with Martinez to lead the Boston Red Sox to their first World Series Championship in 86 years.

=== Robinson Canó ===
Robinson Canó is a professional second baseman baseball player, born on 22 October 1982 in San Pedro de Macorís. At a young age, Canó knew he wanted to become a baseball player. He was first signed by the New York Yankees as a free agent in 2001, at the age of 18. Since then, Canó has played with the Seattle Mariners and on 3 December 2018, was traded to the New York Mets on a five-year contract.

=== Juan Soto ===
Juan Soto was born on 25 October 1998 in Santo Domingo. In 2015, the Washington Nationals signed Juan Soto for $1.5 million, a franchise record for an international prospect. Soto was considered instrumental in helping the Nationals win the 2019 World Series against the Houston Astros, leading the team in hits, walks, runs scored, and home runs. In the shortened 2020 season, Soto became the youngest batting champion in National League history. The Nationals offered Soto a 15-year, $440 million extension in 2022, which he declined. Washington, now at risk of losing Soto to free agency in 2024, dealt their All Star to the San Diego Padres in a "seismic" midseason move. Soto would be traded once again before the 2024 season, this time to the New York Yankees.

Soto helped the Yankees reach their first World Series since 2009, losing to the Los Angeles Dodgers in five games. The topic of Soto's pending free agency at the conclusion of the season was ever-present during his time with the Yankees. He ultimately signed with the Yankees' crosstown rival, the New York Mets, at 15-years, $765 million, the largest contract in professional sports history.

=== Most Valuable Player ===
Season	Shell Awards	Apollo Productions
1971–72	Jesús Frías (EO) / Pedro Borbón (TL)	-
1972–73	Winston Llenas (AC)	-
1973–74	Teodoro Martínez (TL)	-
1974–75	Rafael Batista (EO)	-
1975–76	Miguel Diloné (AC)	-
1976–77	Miguel Diloné (AC) (2)	-
1977–78	Carlos Julio Pérez (TL)	Carlos Julio Pérez (TL)
1978–79	Ramón Pérez (AC)	Bob Beall (AC)
1979–80	Rafael Landestoy (TL)	Jerome Dybzenski (TL)
1980–81	Tony Peña (AC)	Tony Peña (AC)
1981–82	Tony Peña (AC) (2)	Tony Peña (AC) (2)
1982–83	Tony Peña (AC) (3)	Tony Peña (AC) (3) / César Gerónimo (TL)
1983–84	Rufino Linares (CS)	Rufino Linares (CS)
1984–85	Julio Solano (EO)	Ken Howell (TL)
1985–86	Rufino Linares (EO) (2)	Rufino Linares (LE) (2)
1986–87	Tony Peña (AC) (4)	Robert Brower (AE)
1987–88	Félix Fermín (AC)	Mark Parent (EO)
1988–89	Domingo Michel (TL)	Domingo Michel (TL)
1989–90	Félix José (TL)	Dave Hansen (TL)
1990–91	Bernie Tatís (AC)	Andújar Cedeño (AE)
1991–92	José Núñez (LE)	Luis Mercedes (EO)
1992–93	Bernie Tatís (AC) (2)	Tom Marsh (AC)
1993–94	Silvestre Campusano (TL)	Gerónimo Berroa (LE)
1994–95	Domingo Martínez (AC)	Domingo Martínez (AC)
1995–96	Mario Brito (LE)	Sherman Obando (AC)
1996–97	Tony Batista (AC)	Tony Batista (AC)
1997–98	José Oliva (EO)	José Oliva (EO)
1998–99	Adrian Beltré (EO)	Adrian Beltré (EO)
1999–00	David Ortíz (LE)	David Ortíz (LE)
2000–01	Félix José (EO) (2)	Félix José (EO)
2001–02	Mendy López (AC)	Eric Byrnes (TL)
2002–03	Félix José (EO) (3)	Félix José (EO) (2)
2003–04	Julio Ramírez (GC)	Julio Ramírez (GC)
2004–05	Erick Almonte (EO)	Erick Almonte (EO)
2005–06	Esteban Germán (AE)	Willis Otañez (TL)
2006–07	Mendy López (AC) (2)	Erick Almonte (GC) (2)
2007–08	Emilio Bonifacio (TL)	Brayan Peña (GC)
2008–09	Víctor Díaz (AC)	Víctor Díaz (AC)
2009–10	Juan Francisco (GC)	Juan Francisco (GC)
2010–11	Héctor Luna (AC)	Juan Francisco (GC) (2)
2011–12	Joaquín Arias (AC)	Joaquín Arias (AC)
2012–13	Héctor Luna (AC) (2) / Mauro Gómez (LE)	Héctor Luna (AC)
2013–14	Gregory Polanco (LE)	Gregory Polanco (LE)
2014–15	Cristhian Adames (TE)	Marcos Mateo (EO)
2015–16	Audy Ciriaco (EO)	Tyler White (EO)
Temporada	Premios Total	Producciones Apolo
2016–17	Rubén Sosa (LE)	Rubén Sosa (LE)
2017–18	Franchy Cordero (LE)	Franchy Cordero (LE)
2018–19	Jordany Valdespín (TE)	Jordany Valdespín (TE)
2019–20	Peter O'Brien (TE)	Peter O'Brien (TE)
2020–21	Ronald Guzmán (GC)	Ronald Guzmán (GC)

== Attendances ==
The 2023-24 LIDOM clubs by average home attendance:

#	Club	Average attendance
1	Águilas Cibaeñas	10,674
2	Leones del Escogido	9,865
3	Tigres del Licey	9,562
4	Estrellas Orientales	7,653
5	Gigantes del Cibao	7,346
6	Toros del Este	6,785

== See also ==
- Sport in the Dominican Republic
- Dominican Republic national baseball team
- List of Major League Baseball players from the Dominican Republic

Other Dominican bat-and-ball games:

- Plaquita
- Vitilla
