= Joseph Vijay =

Joseph Vijay may refer to:

- C. Joseph Vijay, Indian politician and actor
- Joseph Vijay (guitarist), Indian guitarist
