= 91st Pennsylvania Infantry Regiment =

Union Army infantry regiment

91st Pennsylvania Infantry
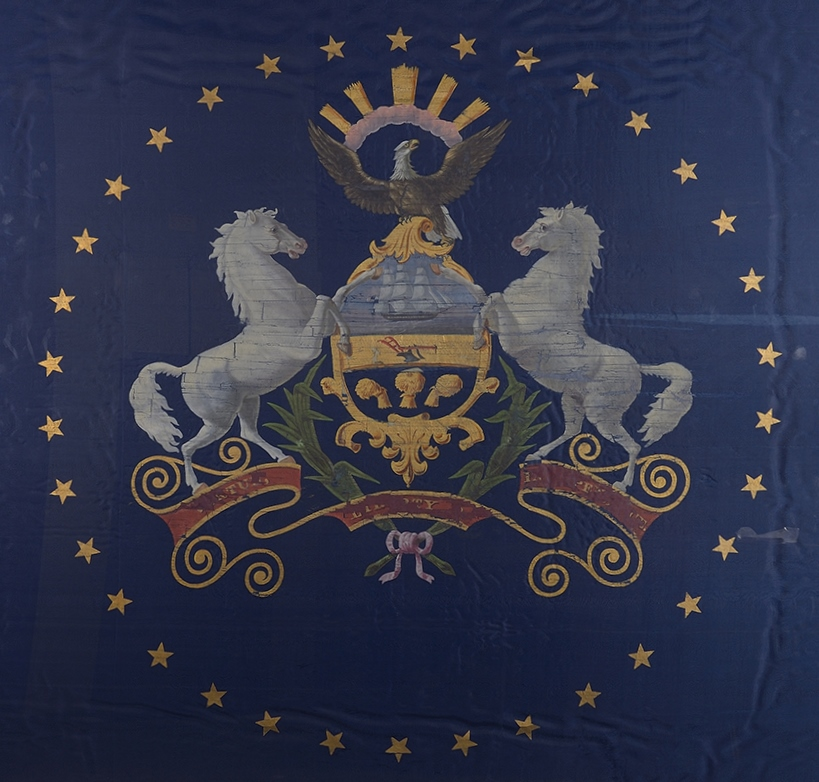
- State flag of Pennsylvania, c. 1863
- Active: December 4, 1861 – July 10, 1865
- Country: United States
- Allegiance: Union
- Branch: Infantry
- Size: Regiment
- Engagements: American Civil War: Battle of Fredericksburg; Battle of Chancellorsville; Battle of Gettysburg; Overland Campaign; Battle of Spottsylvania Court House; Battle of North Anna; Battle of Cold Harbor; Siege of Petersburg; Battle of Peebles's Farm; First Battle of Hatcher's Run; Second Battle of Hatcher's Run; Battle of Gravelly Run; Battle of Five Forks; Appomattox Campaign

The 91st Pennsylvania Volunteer Infantry was a Union infantry regiment which fought in multiple key engagements of the American Civil War, including the Battle of Fredericksburg, Battle of Chancellorsville and Battle of Gettysburg. It was established through the combined efforts of Edgar M. Gregory, who had received approval from the U.S. War Department to begin recruiting soldiers for an entirely new regiment during the fall of 1861, and Edward E. Wallace, who had initiated his own recruitment efforts that October. Their recruits were volunteers, the majority of whom initially enlisted for three-year terms of service from their hometown of Philadelphia; they were divided into 10 lettered companies upon muster in during early December 1861: A, B, C, D, E, F, G, H, I, and K. (In later years, as the war dragged on and the need for reinforcements arose, additional men were drafted from communities across the state.)

The men who enrolled with the 91st Pennsylvania wore modified Zouave uniforms (dark blue Zouave-style jacket and vest with yellow trim, sky blue sash, sky blue pantaloons, and red fez with blue tassel). The regiment's leaders were presented with the unit's First State Color on December 6, a flag which had been manufactured by Horstmann Brothers and Company.

After serving for almost four years, they officially mustered out on July 10, 1865, and disbanded upon their return to Philadelphia.

== History ==
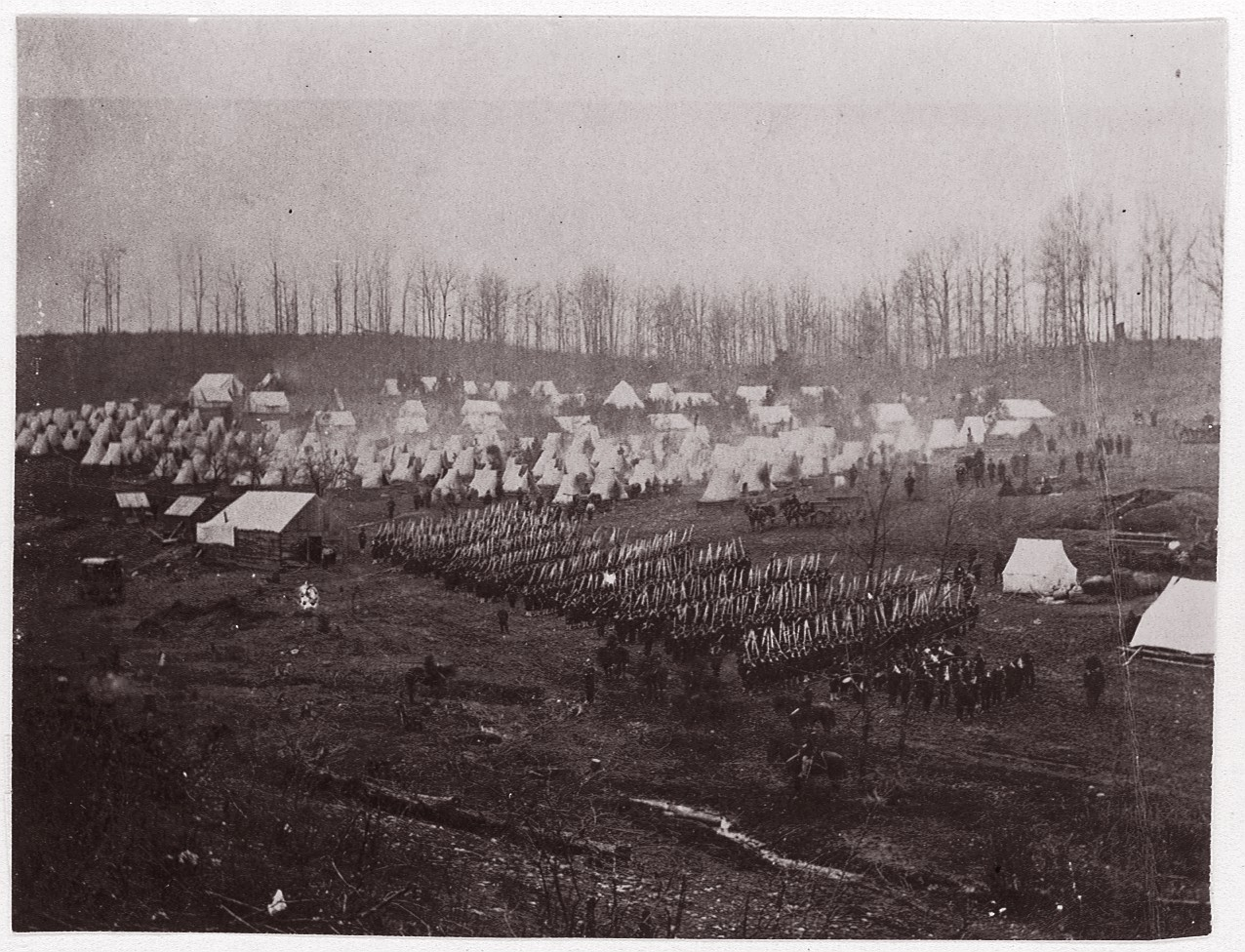
91st Pennsylvania Volunteer Infantry at Camp Northumberland, Virginia, 1861 (Matthew Brady, Metropolitan Museum of Art).

The regiment, which was made up of 10 lettered companies (A, B, C, D, E, F, G, H, I, and K), was raised near Philadelphia during the fall of 1861. The majority of its men were volunteers who had initially enlisted for three-year tours of duty. After enrolling with the 91st Pennsylvania, they officially mustered in with their regiment for Federal service on December 4 of that year, and received basic training at Camp Chase, Gray's Ferry in Schuylkill County

Field and staff officers included: Edgar I. Gregory (colonel), Edward E. Wallace (lieutenant colonel), Isaac D. Knight, M.D. (surgeon), and George W. Todd (major). The first commanding officers of each company were: Frank B. Gilbert (A); Alpheus H. Bowman (B); Peter Keyser (C); Joseph Hill Sinex (D), who was promoted to second in command of the regiment in 1863; John D. Lentz (E), who was promoted to third in command of the regiment in 1862; Albert C. Fetters (F); Eli G. Sellers (G), who was promoted to second in command of the regiment in 1864; Charles S. Brown (H); John P. Carie (I); and John F. Casner (K), who was promoted to third in command of the regiment in 1865.

=== January through November 1862 ===
Ordered to Washington, D.C., on January 21, 1862, the regiment made camp three miles outside of the city along Bladensburg Road. Beginning on February 28, 1862, Company A was assigned to guard duty at the Old Capitol Prison in Washington, D.C., with Company E assigned to patrol duties in the city. On March 19, Company D was assigned to duties at the central guard house, and Company G was moved to Long Bridge for duties there while the remainder of the regiment continued to reside at the regiment's barracks at Franklin Square.

Less than two months into these new duty assignments, an incident occurred which made newspaper headlines. According to The Evening Star, while Ambrose Baker of C Company was on guard duty at the Old Capitol Prison during the morning of April 21, he shot Jesse B. Wharton, a political prisoner, because Wharton was looking out of a window on the prison's south side at him while he [Baker] was embroiled in an argument with another guard. Struck in the head by a ball from Baker's gun at roughly 11 a.m, Wharton died around 3 p.m. Despite claims that he had been ordered by his superior officer, Lt. Milligan, to shoot any prisoners looking out of windows, Baker was arrested.

Six days later, the regiment was ordered to Alexandria, Virginia, where it relieved the 88th Pennsylvania and was assigned to provost (military police) duty with Col. Gregory and Capt. Joseph H. Sinex appointed, respectively, as military governor and provost marshal of the city. Gregory was headquartered "at Mr. C. A. Baldwin's, on St. Asaph street," according to the Alexandria Gazette.

Relieved by the 94th New York on August 21, the 91st Pennsylvania was attached next to the U.S. Army's 5th Corps, 1st Brigade, 2nd Division which had been ordered to join Gen. John Pope's forces. Stationed near Cloud's Mills, Virginia until August 28, the 91st Pennsylvania then served as an escort for eighty-seven wagons being moved to the Fairfax Court House, but was ordered back to camp upon reaching Annandale. Stationed at Fort Ellsworth from August 29–30, the 91st made camp at Fort Stevenson from September 1–12, when it moved on.

Next engaged in duties on the Monocacy Creek as part the Union's Maryland Campaign beginning September 15, the 91st Pennsylvania moved to Antietam three days later. Connecting with the Third Division on October 16, the 91st crossed the Potomac River on a valley reconnaissance mission, during which it skirmished with Confederate States Army (CSA) troops at Shepherdstown. On October 30, the regiment was moved to Warrenton as part of the Union Army's reorganization during the leadership transition from generals George B. McClellan to Ambrose Burnside. Encamped at Stoneman's Switch from mid-November to December 11, the 91st Pennsylvania then marched to the Phillips House as part of the lead-up to the Battle of Fredericksburg.

=== Battle of Fredericksburg ===
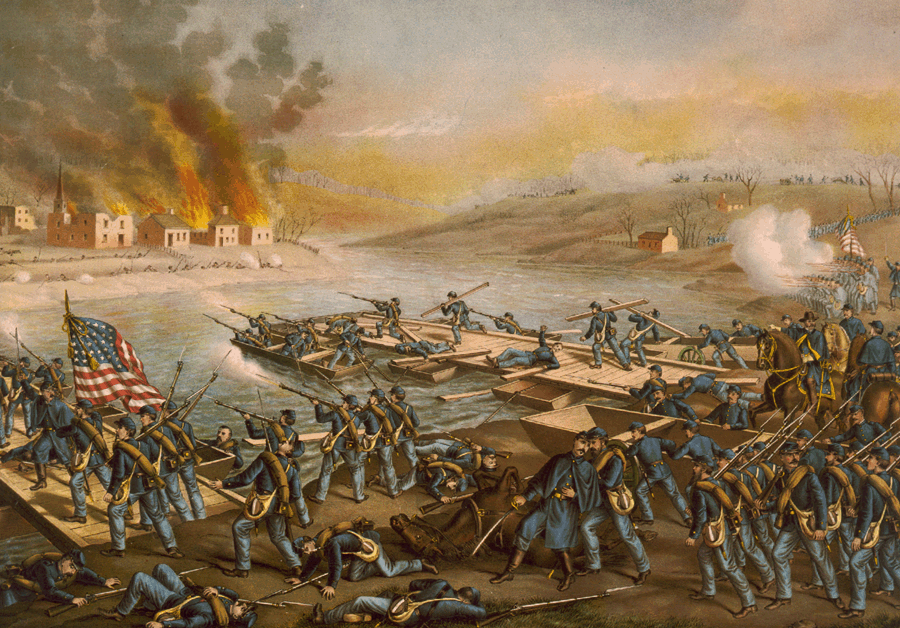
The Army of the Potomac crossing the Rappahannock on the morning of December 13, 1862 prior to the Battle of Fredericksburg (Kurz & Allison, U.S. Library of Congress).

Crossing the Rappahannock River at 9 o'clock on the morning of December 13, the 91st Pennsylvanians were quickly involved in the Battle of Fredericksburg. Ordered to support the 2nd Corps, regimental leaders marched their men through Fredericksburg, and stationed them behind the stone walls of a cemetery outside of the city, a post they held until ordered onto the Union's Fredericksburg Road line, where they were subject to heavy artillery fire and sustained several casualties, including the combat deaths of Lt. George Murphy and Maj. Todd. Todd sustained his mortal wound "when a shot tore off his right leg," according to historian Francis Augustin O'Reilly. The Alexandria Gazette reported that Col. Gregory of the 91st had also been shot in the hand during the battle.

During a charge on CSA lines begun at 5 o'clock that evening, the 91st lost an additional two officers and 87 men.

Ordered to retreat at 8 p.m., the 91st Pennsylvania marched back into Fredericksburg. Four hours later, it was ordered back out to the front, where it assisted in transferring wounded men from where they had fallen to the care of Union medical personnel, working until sunrise. On December 15, the regiment engaged in the construction of earthenworks, and was also ordered to protect the Richmond Railroad on picket duty.

=== The Mud March and its aftermath ===
Beginning January 20, 1863, the 91st Pennsylvania joined Gen. Ambrose Burnside's Mud March during which it helped build corduroy roads to facilitate troop and equipment movements. When Union lines became bogged down and were unable to progress further, the regiment then returned to camp. By this time, the regiment was under the command of Joseph H. Sinex, who had been placed in charge following the departure of Lt. Col. Wallace, who had been honorably discharged on a surgeon's certificate of disability on January 10.

At the end of February, the Alexandria Gazette noted that the regiment had presented its commanding officer, Col. E. M. Gregory, "with an elegant sword, and a splendid horse, in token "of their approbation of his gallant conduct at the battle of Fredericksburg, Dec. 13th.'" The newspaper also noted that the regiment was part of Humphrey's Division at this time, and was encamped at Falmouth.

The regiment was divided beginning April 13 when its left wing was ordered to Banks' Ford and its right to United States Ford, and assigned to picket duty until relieved on April 25 by the 155th Pennsylvania.

=== Battle of Chancellorsville ===
Three days later, on April 28, the 91st Pennsylvanians joined other Union troops from the 5th, 11th and 12th Corps in a march toward Chancellor House. Crossing Kelly's and Ely's Fords, they reached their destination during the morning of May 1, 1863. At noon, they were ordered to march again for Banks' Ford but, while en route, were redirected to Richardson's Ford, where they joined the Union Army's lines at the right during the Battle of Chancellorsville. While in this position, they dug entrenchments and built earthenworks until relieved of these duties by soldiers from the 11th Corps at 6 p.m. on May 3.

Ordered back to Chancellor House, the 91st Pennsylvanians advanced into a tangled, wooded area, where they skirmished briefly with CSA troops before moving on. As they approached the CSA's main force, they fell under withering fire, but held their ground until noon when they were forced to withdraw due to their severely depleted ammunition supplies. Leaving dead and wounded men behind, they were assaulted by intense artillery fire during their retreat, but were able to regroup and be reposted at the fork of the Chancellorsville and United States Ford roads, where they remained until noon the next day (May 4) when they were ordered to move to the rear of the Union's lines and resume work on fortifications. Ordered back to the front that evening, they protected other retreating soldiers before being ordered to return to camp.

Relieving the 32nd Massachusetts at Stoneman's Switch on May 28, the 91st Pennsylvanians guarded the railroad from the station to Potomac Bridge before being assigned to cavalry relief on June 4 at United States Ford. Five days later, they were ordered back to Mount Holly Church and then to Catlett's Station before being attached to the forces of Gen. Stephen H. Weed. Ordered to head for Frederick City by way of Manassas Junction, Gum Spring and Aldie, they crossed the Potomac at Edwards' Ferry, they then continued on to Hanover, Pennsylvania, arriving during the evening of July 1, 1863.

=== Battle of Gettysburg ===
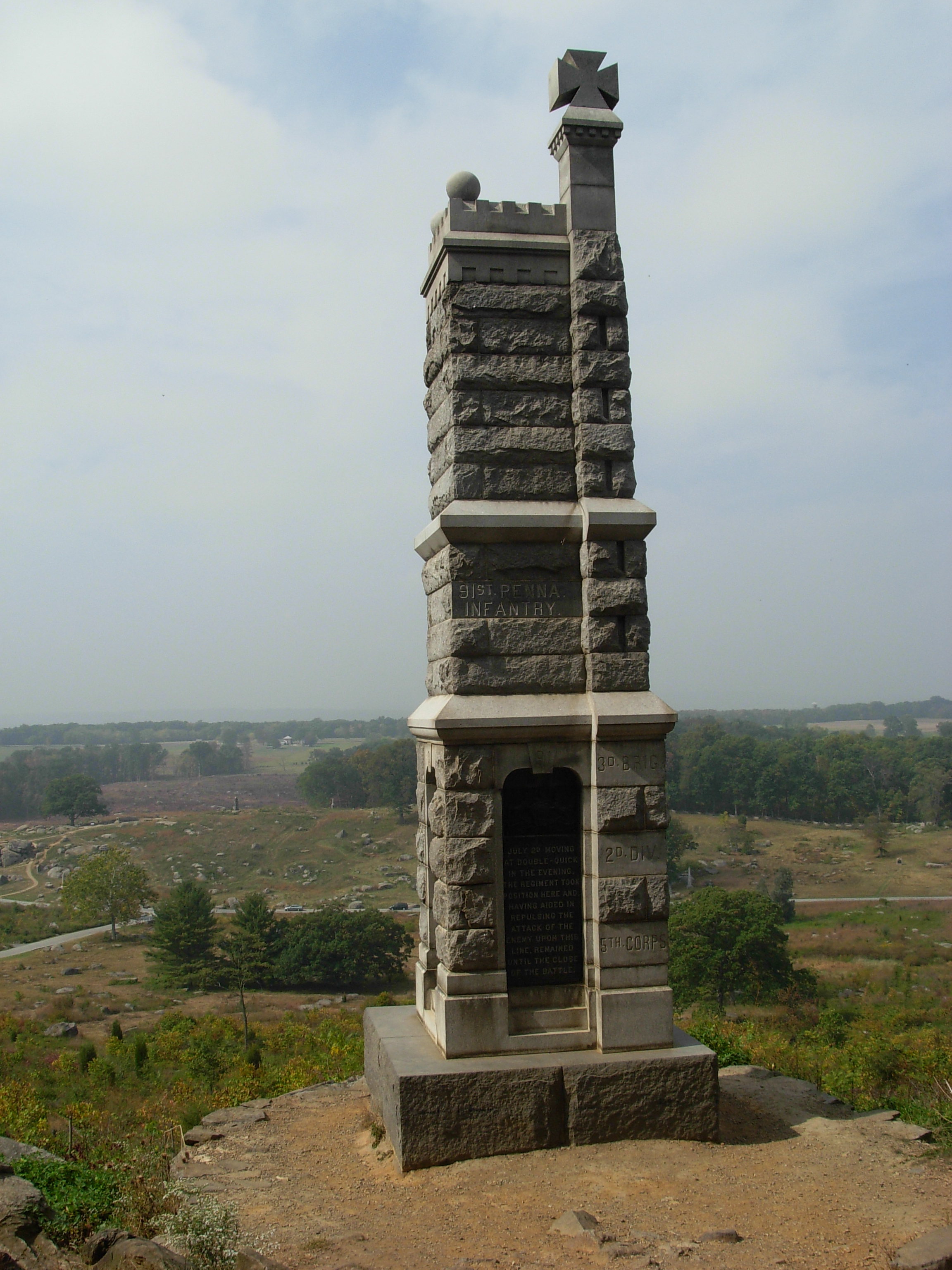
91st Pennsylvania Volunteer Infantry monument, Gettysburg National Military Park.

At 8 p.m. on July 1, 1863, the 91st Pennsylvanians marched for Gettysburg, Pennsylvania. Arriving four hours later, they were ordered to rest on their arms until 4 a.m., when they again resumed their march. After reaching their designated position on the right of the Union Army during this second day of the Battle of Gettysburg, they fought at this spot for an hour before shifting left to support the Union's center.

At 2 p.m., they marched for Little Round Top to relieve a segment of the beleaguered 3rd Corps, and were soon engaging CSA sharpshooters positioned in the Devil's Den. Gen. Weed was among those killed here during this time. As night fell, the 91st Pennsylvanians prepared for further combat by improving their fortifications.

On the Fourth of July, skirmishers from the regiment took several CSA soldiers prisoner as they infiltrated CSA positions. En route, the 91st sustained 21 casualties (two officers, 19 enlisted men). Departing Little Round Top the next afternoon at 4 p.m., they marched for Marsh Creek, where they remained until ordered to drive CSA troops from Utica, Middletown, Boonsboro, and across the Antietam Creek. Within a week, major newspapers across American had begun to publish casualty reports from the 91st Pennsylvania and other Union regiments.

By July 12, the 91st Pennsylvanians were once again engaged in strengthening Union fortifications. The next day, they fired heavily upon CSA troops nearby, forcing their continued retreat. Advancing toward Williamsport the next day, they captured more CSA soldiers. By campaign's end, they were guarding rail lines along the Rappahannock, as well as the Orange and Alexandria Railroad.

=== Reenlistment and veterans' furlough ===
Despite the intense combat experiences they had endured during the early part of their service, many of the 91st Pennsylvanians opted to re-enlist when their initial three-year terms of service expired. For a significant number of these men, that reenlistment date was December 26, 1863. Some who did not reenlist were transferred to the 155th Pennsylvania.

As a reward for these reenlistments, members of the regiment were granted veteran furloughs and permitted to return home. Departing January 2, 1864, the regiment paraded down Chestnut Street after its arrival in Philadelphia, passing in front of Independence Hall. Regimental headquarters were then opened on Chestnut (below Fifth), and recruiting was resumed under the management of Lt. Shipley. While home on furlough, the regiment's First State Color was retired (in January 1864) and returned to Harrisburg for safekeeping. The regiment was then issued its Second State Color (in February 1864), which was manufactured by the same firm which had produced its first battle flag.

Their furloughs over on February 16, the 91st Pennsylvanians reported back to headquarters, and were then moved to the Upland Institute in Chester, where they remained until leaving for winter quarters at Warrenton Junction on March 2. According to Bates' History of Pennsylvania Volunteers, during this phase of duty, regimental leaders used this time to replenish their ranks, enrolling additional recruits from mid to late March (five of whom were categorized as "Unassigned Men").

=== 1864 campaigns ===
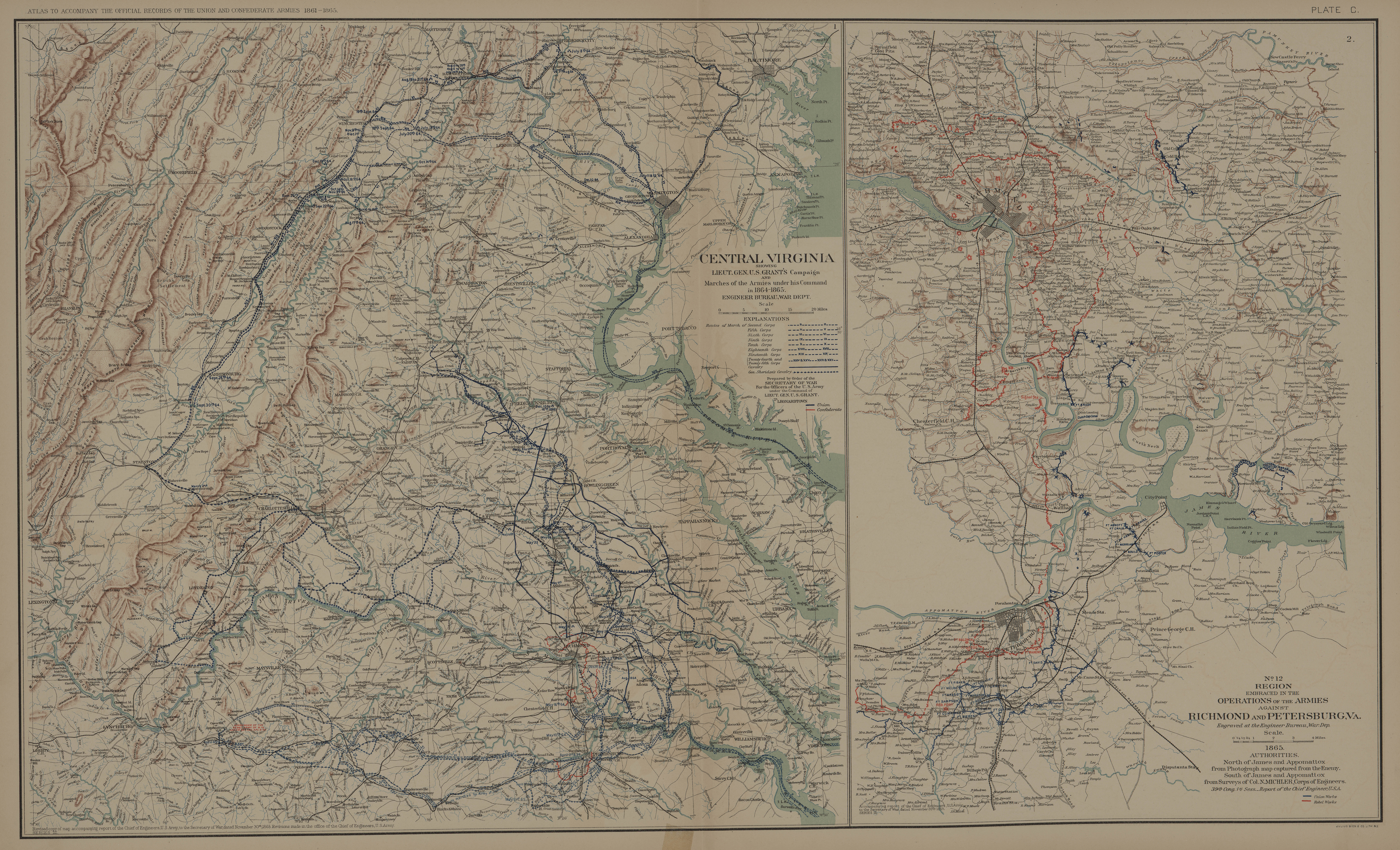
U.S. Army Chief of Engineers' map showing key sites of the Union's 1864-1865 Overland, Petersburg and Appomattox campaigns (updated Nov. 30, 1865).

During their spring campaign in 1864, the 91st Pennsylvanians departed Culpeper, Virginia, at 11 p.m. on May 3, and headed for Germania Ford. Crossing the river early the next morning, they marched on to Wilderness Tavern, where they were ordered to post pickets and make camp. The next morning, they were positioned at the right side of their brigade's battle line near the vicinity of Parker's Store as part of the Overland Campaign. After one brief charge through a thicket, they remained on duty at their assigned post. Ordered to relieve a unit of reserves from the Keystone State the next day, they skirmished with CSA troops off and on until 1 a.m. May 7 when they were ordered to move behind the Union's earthenworks nearby. Fending off a series of CSA charges, they were ordered to withdraw at 9 p.m. During this retreat, Color-Sgt. Robert Chism was trampled by a horse; he died later following the amputation of his injured leg.

Assigned to relieve the cavalry stationed near Todd's Tavern around 7 a.m., they slowly advanced under heavy artillery fire to Laurel Hill. Holding this spot for several hours, they then retreated to a ridge at the rear, leaving regimental skirmishers to keep control of the knoll. The bulk of the regiment then set to work bolstering existing earthenworks.

During the morning of May 12, the 91st Pennsylvania staged a diversion in the face of heavy rifle and artillery fire which enabled the 2nd Corps to effect a larger, surprise charge on the CSA. When Lt. Col. Sinex and Lt. Shipley were wounded during the ruse, Maj. Lentz assumed command. The 91st Pennsylvania then moved on to the Spottsylvania Court House, where it joined with the 140th New York in driving away CSA troops stationed at the Myers' House. Following a brief respite from the action, during which they were relieved by a 6th Corps brigade which ultimately lost the ground they had just gained, they returned with the 140th New York to recapture the area around the court house. After succeeding under heavy artillery fire, they were then relieved again and repositioned in front and to the left of Spottsylvania.

Positioned near the front of the Union Army as it marched on Richmond, the 91st Pennsylvania sustained 11 killed and wounded in the fight at North Anna on May 23. F Company's Capt. Henry Francis and another four were wounded while serving under heavy fire during the Union's relief of the 4th Division near the Richmond Turnpike. Francis had sustained wounds to his shoulder and back, according to The New York Herald.

Transferred to the 1st Brigade, 1st Division under Col. Jacob B. Sweitzer after arriving at Cold Harbor on June 4, they crossed the James River on June 16, and headed for Petersburg. Posted initially to the left of the 9th Corps, they were shifted to the battle lines at the rear of the 3rd Division at dawn two days later. Charging with other Union troops, they drove away CSA troops and helped capture a key segment of the Suffolk and Petersburg Railroad as part of the siege of Petersburg. During the intense, four-hour battle, Lts. Edward J. Maguigan and Justus A. Gregory were wounded. As their division moved on at dusk, they drove more CSA troops away by charging a hill nearby. June 21 was then spent on skirmish detail. But these successes were costly. Eighty-two members of the regiment (nearly a full company's worth of men) had been killed or wounded.

Assigned to strengthen Union fortifications during most of July and to garrison detail from the end of that month until August 18, the 91st Pennsylvanians briefly engaged the CSA near the Weldon Railroad. By September 30, they were engaged in the Battle of Peebles's Farm and involved in the capture of a neighboring fort. After building additional fortifications in the area in early October, they drove off CSA troops stationed at Davis House, and burned the structure.

While involved in the fight at Hatcher's Run on October 28, the regiment sustained additional casualties, including Capts. Casner and Closson, who were seriously wounded.

=== 1865 campaigns and war's end ===
While attempting once again to destroy the Weldon Railroad in early January 1865 and engaging the CSA again at Hatcher's Run on February 6, the 91st Pennsylvania sustained further casualties, including Capt. John Edgar Jr., who was killed, and Lt. William H. Frailey, who was wounded. In addition, Capt. George P. Finney was captured, as were several other members of the regiment. Then, while fighting at Dabney's Mill in the Second Battle of Hatcher's Run and the Battle of Gravelly Run in late March, the regiment lost 14 more men, including Capt. Hope. During the fighting at Five Forks and Sailor's Creek, the regiment had less costly successes, however, and was able to assist in the capture of supply wagons and CSA troops while driving the larger body of the CSA toward the Appomattox Court House. While there, the 91st Pennsylvanians witnessed the formal surrender on April 9, 1865, of the Confederate States Army by Gen. Robert E. Lee.

The war technically over but the preservation of America's Union not yet completely assured, the regiment was subsequently marched to Petersburg and Sutherland Station, where it remained until May 4 when it was ordered to Richmond and then Bailey's Crossroads.

On May 23, the 91st Pennsylvania marched in the Union's Grand Review of the Armies in Washington, D.C., a massive military parade which had been ordered held by President Andrew Johnson both to honor the soldiers who had fought for the Union during the long war and to lift the spirits of the nation in the wake of the assassination of Johnson's predecessor Abraham Lincoln.

The regiment then officially mustered out on July 10, 1865, and disbanded after its men returned to Philadelphia.

== Battle flags, uniforms and other equipment ==
The leaders of the 91st Pennsylvania Infantry were presented with the regiment's First State Color on December 6, a flag which had been manufactured by Horstmann Brothers and Company and which was carried by regimental color bearers until January 1864 when it was retired from service. Returned to Harrisburg while members of the regiment were visiting Pennsylvania on an approved veterans' furlough, it was replaced in February of that same year with the regiment's Second State Color, which was also manufactured by Horstmann Brothers.

The men who enrolled with the 91st Pennsylvania wore modified Zouave uniforms (dark blue Zouave-style jacket and vest with yellow trim, sky blue sash, sky blue pantaloons, and red fez with blue tassel).

== Casualties ==
The 91st Pennsylvania Volunteers incurred at least 200 casualties during its service tenure, including six officers and 110 enlisted men who were killed or mortally wounded in action and two officers and 82 enlisted men who died from disease-related causes. At least four members of the regiment were also declared missing in action and dropped from the regiment's rolls.

In addition, under a series of General Orders (No. 302, 307, 319, 320, 365, 368, and 394), issued by the U.S. War Department and Office of the Adjutant General in Washington, D.C., between September 7 and December 12, 1863, roughly 20 members of the regiment were declared physically unfit to continue serving, and were transferred to the "Invalid Corps" (Veteran Reserve Corps) from September through December 1863.

== Monuments and memorials ==
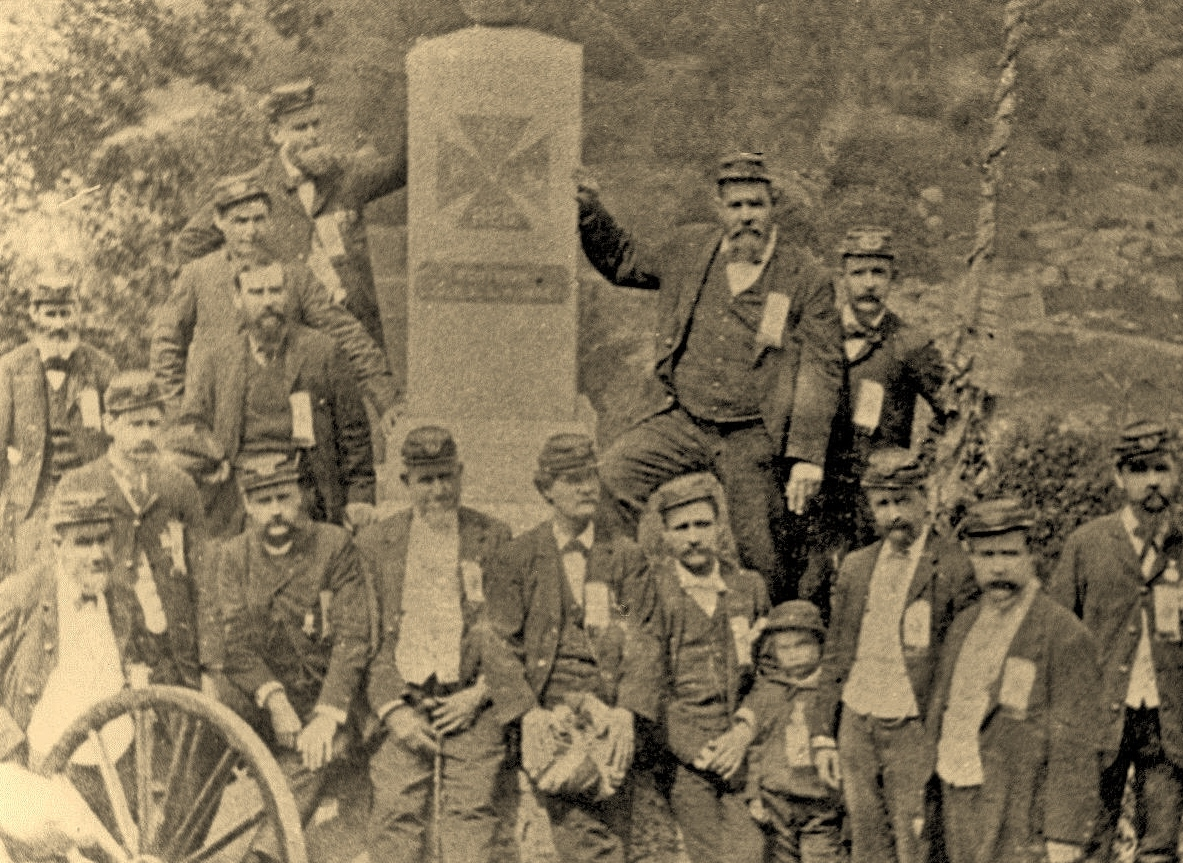
Col. Joseph Hill Sinex (center, hand on monument) with former members of the 91st Pennsylvania at the regiment's new monument at the highest point on Little Round Top, Gettysburg National Military Park, c. 1889.

One of the more frequently visited sites at the Gettysburg National Military Park is the castellated granite tower which commemorates the service of the 91st Pennsylvania Volunteers during the Battle of Gettysburg. Erected on September 12, 1889, at the highest point of Little Round Top, "this monument appears to hang over the western edge of the hillside, just off the asphalt path that winds throughout the summit," according to park officials, and documents the exact position defended by the regiment from July 2–3, 1863. Created by the Ryegate Granite Works in Ryegate, Vermont, the monument is composed of a series of five-foot-square blocks topped by a finial emblazoned with the 5th U.S. Army Corps' Maltese cross. Situated atop a square base that is seven feet high, the entire structure stands 25.6 feet tall, and is flanked by one-foot-square granite markers with flat tops and mitred edges. (Note: These edges were mitred later as part of a repair effort to fix the damaged corners on the flanking markers.) Polished, inscribed panels convey key details about the regiment's service.

== Gallery ==
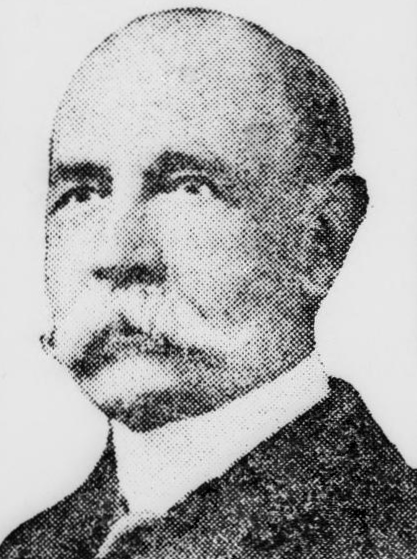
Capt. Alpheus H. Bowman (shown as ret. Brig. Gen., 1926)

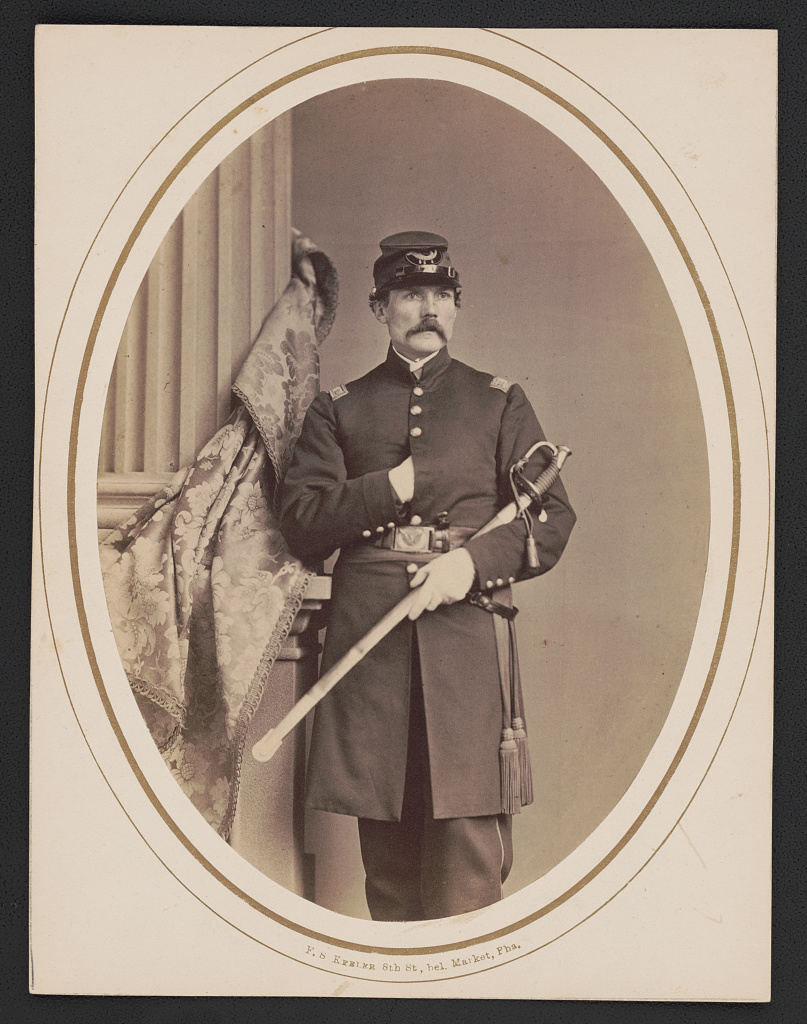
Capt. John P. Carie

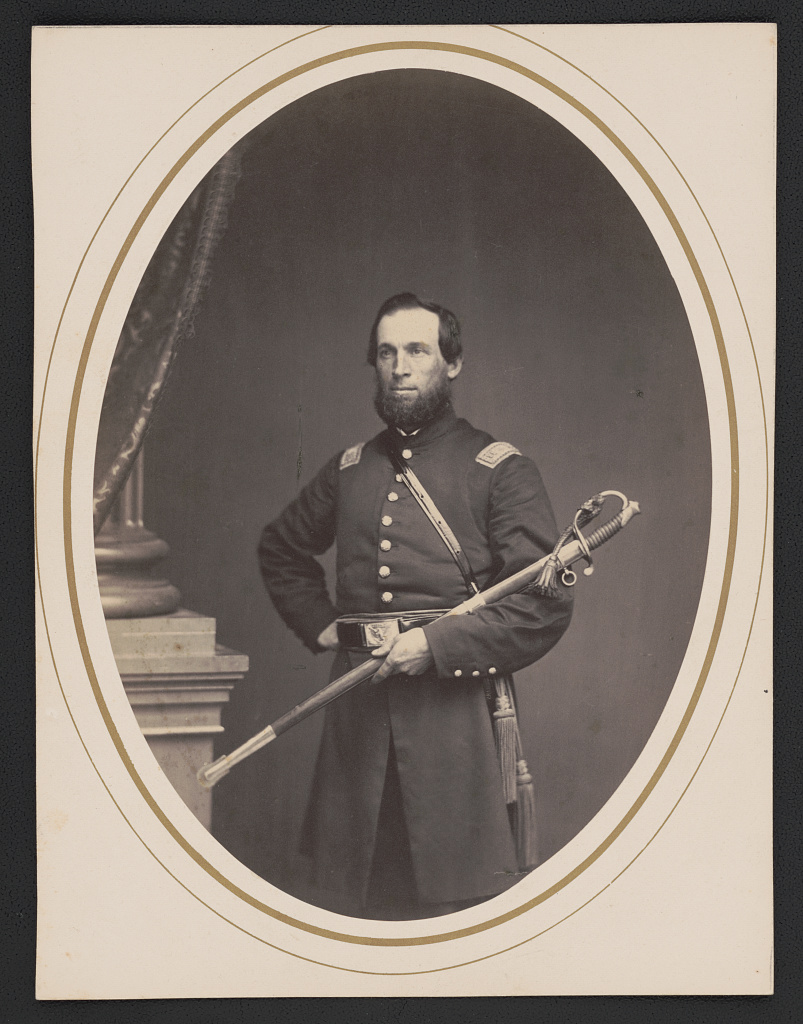
Capt. Albert C. Fetter

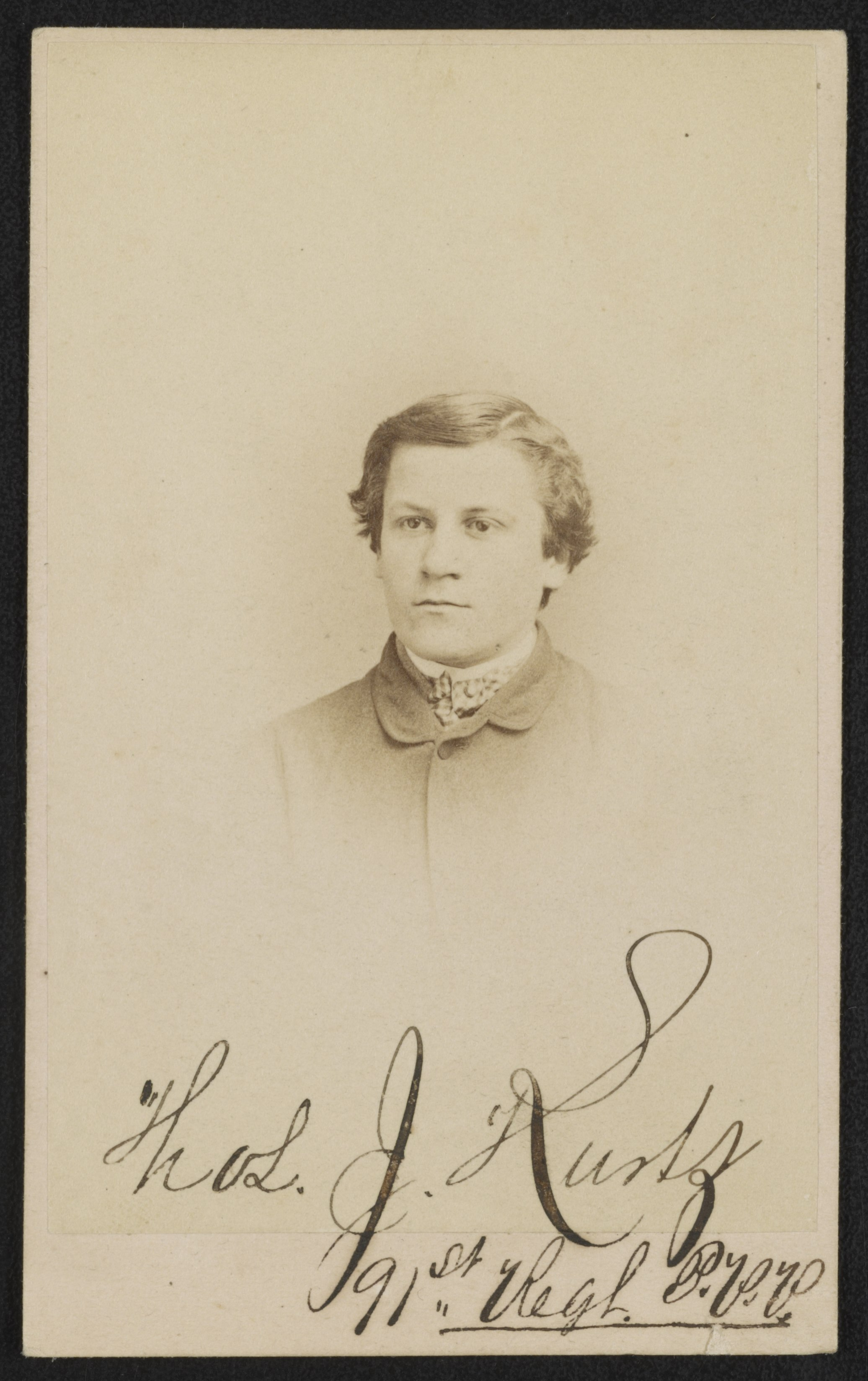
Pvt. Thomas J. Kurtz

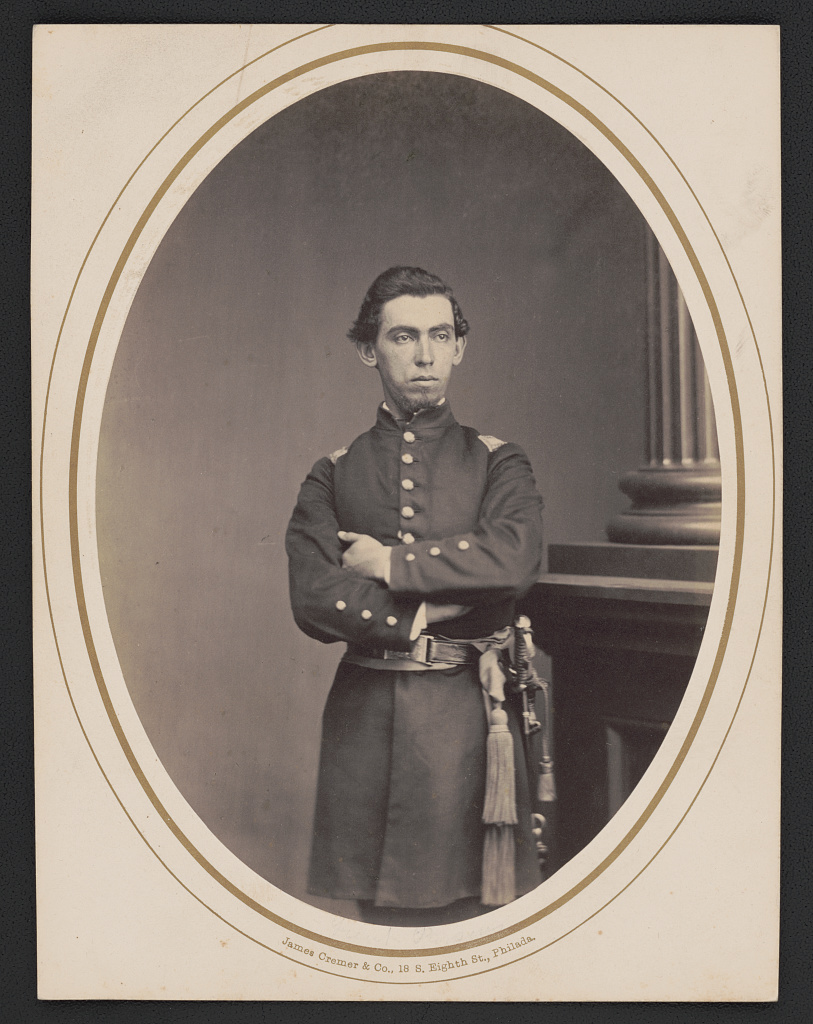
2nd Lt. Theodore H. Parsons

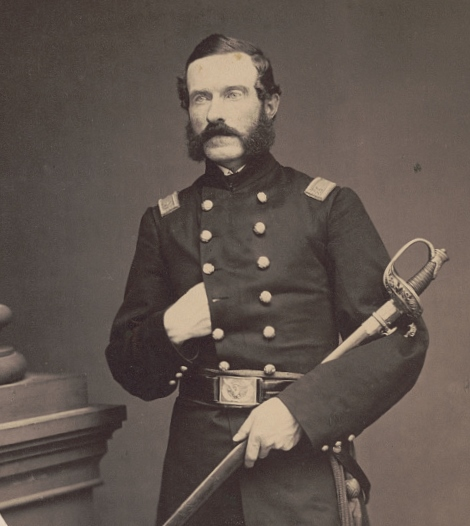
Lt. Col. George W. Todd

== See also ==
- List of Pennsylvania Civil War regiments

== External resources ==
- "91st Infantry" (first and second state colors), in "Pennsylvania Civil War Battle Flags." Harrisburg, Pennsylvania: Pennsylvania Capitol Preservation Committee, retrieved online June 30, 2018.
- "91st Regiment," in "Registers of Pennsylvania Volunteers, 1861–1865" (Records of the Department of Military and Veterans' Affairs, RG-19). Harrisburg, Pennsylvania: Pennsylvania State Archives, retrieved online July 4, 2018.
- Banks, John. Letter from 91st Pennsylvania Capt. Thedore Parsons detailing the circumstances of C Company Sgt. William Brown's death (includes image of letter and photo of Parsons in uniform), in "A dog, a Pennsylvania soldier and a death at Fredericksburg." John Banks' Civil War Blog, December 10, 2017.
- Gasbarro, Norman. "91st Pennsylvania Infantry – Pennsylvania Memorial at Gettysburg." PA Historian, retrieved online June 30, 2018.
