= Beiker Graterol =

Venezuelan baseball player (born 1974)

- Pitcher
- Born: November 9, 1974 (age 51); Lara, Venezuela
- Batted: Right Threw: Right

MLB debut
- April 9, 1999, for the Detroit Tigers

Last MLB appearance
- April 9, 1999, for the Detroit Tigers

MLB statistics
- Win–loss record: 0–1
- Earned run average: 15.75
- Strikeouts: 2
- Stats at Baseball Reference

Teams
- Detroit Tigers (1999)

Beiker Graterol [baker / grahterol] (born November 9, 1974) is a Venezuelan former professional baseball right-handed pitcher. He pitched in one game in Major League Baseball (MLB) for the Detroit Tigers in 1999.

== Career ==
Graterol was signed by the Toronto Blue Jays as an amateur free agent in 1992. After spending a few years pitching in the Dominican Republic, he joined the Blue Jays system in 1996 with the St. Catharines Stompers of the New York–Penn League. In 1998, he pitched for the Lara Cardinals en route to a Venezuelan Professional Baseball League championship. On December 14, 1998, he was traded by Toronto to the Detroit Tigers for Eric Ludwick. The Tigers invited him to Major League spring training in 1999.

Graterol made his first and only Major League appearance on April 9, 1999 when he started for the Tigers against the New York Yankees at Yankee Stadium in place of an injured Bryce Florie. Graterol lasted only four innings in a rainy game, surrendering seven earned runs and three home runs, including a grand slam by Chili Davis. After the game, Graterol told reporters he would learn from his mistakes and "be better next time." However, before appearing in another game, he was demoted to the Triple-A Toledo Mud Hens on April 17, never to return to the Major Leagues.

Graterol was unable to find even a minor league contract after the 1999 season and spent 2000 with the Mexico City Tigres of the Mexican League. After a poor year in 2000, Graterol never pitched in affiliated ball again. Later in his career, he pitched for the Rimini Baseball Club of the Italian Baseball League.

Internationally, Graterol played for the Venezuela national baseball team at the 2007 Baseball World Cup.

== See also ==
- List of players from Venezuela in Major League Baseball
