= Joseph Ackabee =

Ojibwe WWI soldier

- Born: Joseph Ackabee; 1 July 1895; Eagle Lake, Kenora District, Ontario, Canada
- Died: 26 November 1973 (aged 78 years, 148 days); Winnipeg, Manitoba, Canada
- Burial place: Assumption Roman Catholic Cemetery, Winnipeg, Manitoba
- Spouse: Charlotte Moore (m. 1921–1973)
- Children: 6, including Stanley Ackabee
- Relatives: Michael Ackabee (brother)
- Military career
- Allegiance: Canada
- Branch: Canadian Machine Gun Corps; Canadian Expeditionary Force
- Service years: 1915–1919
- Rank: Private
- Units: 94th Battalion; 17th Reserve Battalion; 28th Battalion; 2nd Battalion
- Conflicts: World War I
- Awards: Victory Medal; British War Medal
- Other work: Indian Lake Lumber Company

Joseph Ackabee (July 1, 1895 – November 26, 1973) was an Ojibwe veteran of World War I, the first Indigenous person from the Kenora District to be enlisted to the Canadian Expeditionary Force.

== Early life ==
Joseph was born in Eagle Lake of Kenora District, Ontario on July 1, 1895. His father, Andrew, was Iroquois, and his mother, Mary, was of Ojibwe. He was educated and attended St. Mary's Indian Residential School in Kenora, Ontario for eleven years, where he was a proficient hockey player.

== World War I ==
On December 30, 1915, he became the first Ojibwe from the Kenora District to be enlisted to the Canadian Expeditionary Force, to which he joined the 94th Battalion. On May 27, 1916, Ackabee, alongside his brother Michael who joined a month later, continued his training in Port Arthur, and later embarked from Halifax, Nova Scotia aboard the SS Olympic on June 28. Upon reaching England, he was initially assigned to the 17th Reserve Battalion, and later posted to the 28th Battalion and reached his unit in France on September 22. He served with the battalion for several months until he received a leave of absence, which took him back to the United Kingdom in November 1917. In April 1918, Ackabee joined the Canadian Machine Gun Corps' 2nd Battalion and served in France until he returned to England in April 1919, having not been wounded in action. On May 23, he went aboard the Minnekahda and was transported back to Canada, in Halifax. Ackabee later received his official discharge due to demobilization two days later in Toronto.

== Post-war ==
Ackabee returned to Northwestern Ontario. Ten months after his discharge, while attempting to hitch a ride on a freight train to his lumber camp job, he tragically slipped under it and losing his right leg below the knee. Ackabee was employed by the Indian Lake Lumber Company from 1919 to 1932. On September 21, 1921, Ackabee married Charlotte Moore in Kenora. The couple had six children and moved to Winnipeg in 1943.

Ackabee would pass away at the age of 78 in Winnipeg, Manitoba on November 26, 1973 and was buried in the Assumption Roman Catholic Cemetery.
