= Pedro Cepeda =

Puerto Rican baseball player

- Cepeda is pictured in the back row second from right with "Los Dragones"
- Infielder / Outfielder
- Born: January 31, 1905; Cataño, Puerto Rico
- Died: April 16, 1955 (aged 50); San Juan, Puerto Rico
- Batted: Right Threw: Right

Pedro Anibal Cepeda (January 31, 1905 – April 16, 1955), nicknamed "Perucho" and "the Bull", was a Puerto Rican professional baseball player who was considered one of the best players of his generation.

Known the "Babe Cobb of Puerto Rico", referring to his dominance as a hitter and his legendary hustle evocative of both Babe Ruth and Ty Cobb, Cepeda was a Latin American baseball superstar. He was denied the chance to play in the major leagues because he was of African descent and played the bulk of his pro career (which spanned the years 1928 to 1950) before the color line was broken by Jackie Robinson in 1947. Cepeda refused offers to play in the Negro leagues in the mainland United States as he abhorred the racism endemic to American society at the time.

He was the father of baseball hall of famer Orlando Cepeda.

== Baseball career ==
Cepeda was born on January 31, 1905 in Cataño, Puerto Rico. As an adult Cepeda stood 5'11" tall (180 cm.) and weighed 200 lbs (91 kilos). He played sandlot baseball before signing his first pro contract with the San Juan Athletics in 1928. He played shortstop when he came up, although later in his career, he also played first base and the outfield. His aggressive baserunning was evocative of Ty Cobb, as he would slide into an opposing player defending a base with spikes up.

In 1929, he played in the Dominican Republic with the Sandino club, ranking among the league's batting leaders with a .429 average. In 1930, he played with the Venezuelan teams Cincinnati and Macon; he returned to Venezuela to play with Valencia in 1932, Selecion in 1934, Gavilanes in 1935, Centauros in 1939 and 1940 and Santa Marta in 1941.

Throughout the 1930s, Cepeda often played in the Dominican Republic, though he would often return home to play baseball in Puerto Rico. In 1937, he played with the season with the Dragones de Ciudad Trujillo in the Dominican Republic. Featuring future Hall of Famers Satchel Paige, Josh Gibson, and Cool Papa Bell, the team, which was owned by dictator Rafael Trujillo, won the championship of the Dominican League (a professional Caribbean winter league).

The Puerto Rican Winter League, known officially as the Puerto Rican Professional Baseball League, was created in 1938 and Cepeda was one of the first Latin American players who was signed to a contract. In the first four years of the Puerto Rican League's existence, he was its leading hitter, collecting 293 hits in 713 at bats for a .411 average. He played for the Guayama Brujos team that won the 1938–39 and 1939-40 Puerto Rican League championships. Cepeda won batting titles in both of those seasons, with averages of .445 and .383, respectively. He followed that up with averages of .421 and .377 in the 1940–41 and 1941–42 seasons, respectively, both of which were played with the Brujos ("Warlocks").

The Brujos disbanded after four seasons, and Cepeda played for the San Juan Senadores (1943–44 and 1944–45) before moving on to the Mayaquez Indios during the 1944–45 season and then to the Santurce Crabbers for 1945–46. The Crabbers traded him to the Caguas Criollos, where he played for the 1946–47 and 1947–48 seasons. Criollos, managed by Negro leagues star Quincy Trouppe, won the 1947–48 season championship.

Cepeda apparently signed with the Caguas-Guyama team for the 1948–49 season, but records indicate he sat out the season. He returned for one final go-round during the 1949–50 season, where he appeared in a few games for the Ponce Leones.

Cepeda was selected for the 1947 Puerto Rican All Star that played the World Champion New York Yankees, who were engaged on a Latin America tour. Orlando Cepeda claims that his father went four for four in one of the games against the Yankees. Alex Pompez, the owner of the New York Cubans in the Negro leagues, announced he had signed Cepeda to his team, but Cepeda refused to play in the continental United States. According to his son Orlando, Perucho was a hot-headed man who lacked the inclination to put up with racial segregation nor the temperament to endure racism. His nature was so volatile that he was known for regularly battling with hecklers in the stands into his 40s, for which he would be arrested then sent home with an admonishment by the authorities.

== Later years ==
Cepeda was inducted into the Puerto Rico Sports Hall of Fame in 1953 and the Puerto Rican Baseball Hall of Fame in 1991.

Perucho Cepeda never made more than $60 a week playing baseball. A hard-living, hard-drinking man (one of the reasons he was compared to Babe Ruth as he lacked the Babe's power), Pedro Cepeda worked for the San Juan Water Department during the 1940s while continuing to play in the Puerto Rican winter league. He died in 1955 from either cirrhosis of the liver or complications of malaria. Before he died, he ensured that his son Orlando, whom he had mentored as a ballplayer, had been signed to a pro contract with one of his old teams, Santurce. On April 27, 1955, Cepeda died in San Juan, Puerto Rico. Orlando used the $500 signing bonus to pay for his father's funeral.

After Orlando was inducted into the National Baseball Hall of Fame in Cooperstown, New York on July 25, 1999, he toured the museum. He was shown a team picture of the famous Ciudad Trujillo team of 1937, which featured his father. Orlando said: “It’s amazing. I didn’t know my father was here, in that picture, like he was waiting for me. What a surprise!"

== Career statistics ==
Cepeda's Puerto Rican League Career Batting Statistics:

- AB Runs Hits 2B 3B HR RBI SB BA SLG
- 1589 240 516 70 31 14 295 -- .325 .434

== See also ==
- List of Puerto Ricans
