= Luis Graterol Caraballo =

Venezuelan military officer and politician

Luis Gustavo Graterol Caraballo (born 19 June 1965) is a Venezuelan military officer and politician. He was Minister of Food in Venezuela, replacing Major General Hebert García in 2014 and president of Conviasa. He was a Major-General in the Bolivarian National Guard.

== Biography ==
He graduated as a command officer of the Military Academy of the Bolivarian National Guard (AMGNB) of the Batalla de las Queseras del Medio II promotion in 1987. He was promoted in 2012 by former President Hugo Chávez to the rank of brigadier general of the Bolivarian National Guard (GNB), ranking No. 2 in the order of merit. In December 2011 he was appointed president of Aeropostal Alas de Venezuela (Aeropostal), a position he held for more than a year until in August 2013 he was appointed president of Conviasa.

On July 18, 2014, he served as Minister for Water and Air Transportation of the Bolivarian Government of Venezuela, he was appointed by President Nicolás Maduro, a position that he held until August 2, 2014.
