= Stealing Home (2001 film) =

2001 documentary

- Directed by: Robert Anderson Clift; Salomé Aguilera Skvirsky
- Written by: Salomé Aguilera Skvirsky
- Produced by: Robert Anderson Clift; Salomé Aguilera Skvirsky; M. Zach Richter
- Narrated by: Yareli Arizmendi
- Cinematography: Alvin Krinsky; Buddy Squires
- Edited by: Robert Anderson Clift; Keir Peirson
- Distributed by: PBS
- Release date: June 18, 2001
- Running time: 57 minutes
- Country: United States
- Language: English
- Budget: $200,000 (est.)

Stealing Home: The Case of Contemporary Cuban Baseball, commonly known as Stealing Home, is a 2001 documentary about Cuban baseball defectors. The documentary was filmed in the United States, Cuba, and the Dominican Republic.

== Cast ==
| Name | Role |
|---|---|
| Carlos Rodriguez Acosta | Himself – Cuban government official |
| Yareli Arizmendi | Narrator |
| Sigfredo Barros | Himself – Cuban sports journalist |
| Orlando Chinea | Himself – Baseball coach |
| Joe Cubas | Himself – Sports agent |
| Jorge Diaz | Himself – Baseball player |
| Roberto González Echevarría | Himself – Author |
| Adrián Hernández | Himself – Baseball player |
| Joe Kehoskie | Himself – Sports agent |
| Alan Klein | Himself – Sports anthropologist |
| Angel Lopez | Himself – Baseball player |
| Lucia Newman | Herself – CNN reporter (archive footage) |
| Antonio Pacheco | Himself – Baseball player |

- from PBS – Stealing Home
