= Joseph Magaletti =

American murderer and suspected serial killer

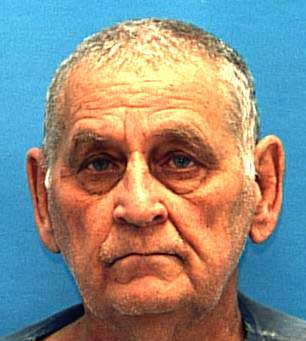
- Born: Joseph Magaletti, Jr. April 5, 1950; White Plains, New York, U.S.
- Died: February 16, 2015 (aged 64); Florida, U.S.
- Conviction: First degree murder (1 count)
- Penalty: Life imprisonment without the possibility of parole

Details
- Victims: 2–3+
- Span of crimes: 1985 – 1995 (known)
- Country: United States
- State: Florida
- Date apprehended: March 23, 1995

Joseph Magaletti Jr. (April 5, 1950 – February 16, 2015) was an American murderer and suspected serial killer who was convicted of killing his neighbor in Sarasota, Florida, in 1995, for which he was sentenced to life imprisonment. After his death in 2015, he was linked to a similar murder dating back to 1985 via touch DNA analysis, and authorities are now investigating his possible involvement in other murders.

== Early life ==
Joseph Magaletti Jr. was born on April 5, 1950, in White Plains, New York. Little is known about his upbringing, but as an adult, he developed a drug addiction that prevented him from holding jobs for too long, due to which Magaletti became a drifter. By the 1980s, he moved to Florida, where he made a living by working various jobs ranging from a cashier to a bouncer at a nightclub.

On May 17, 1981, he was working at a bar named The Crown Lounge when he had to order one client, 31-year-old Irene Rubin Zayas, to leave, as he had attempted to steal a glass from the establishment. Approximately ten minutes, Zayas returned armed with a pocket knife and stabbed Magaletti in the stomach, but the injuries proved minimal. Newspaper accounts from the time claimed that after being released from jail, Zayas smashed the windshield of Magaletti's car and flattened his tires. It is unknown if any further charges were pressed against Zayas, or how much of an impact this incident had on Magaletti in regard to his future crimes.

== Murders ==
On October 13, 1985, 28-year-old Denise Marie Stafford was found strangled to death at home in Sarasota. The discovery was made by her husband, who had just returned from work, only to find his wife murdered but their 1-year-old daughter unharmed. One outlier in this case was that Stafford was apparently standing when she was first struck, and that her killer had moved her body after killing her, leaving behind DNA on her clothes.

On January 9, 1987, 19-year-old Elizabeth "Lisa" Zea left her job at Network Video, and was last seen walking with an unfamiliar man to her car in the shopping plaza parking lot. The pair were later seen driving in the car, but all trace of Zea after that was lost. The following day, a passer-by walking through a residential area in Sarasota passed by a car and noticed that the woman inside was dead. The car, a red 1980 Toyota Corolla, matched the description of Zea's car, and the body was sent for an autopsy for possible identification. A day after, the body was positively identified as Zea, and it was later revealed that she had been beaten to death. Following this, her brother devoted a large portion of his time to discussing his sister's murder both in interviews and in person, culminating in the foundation of a committee that aimed to raise a $10,000 reward for anyone that could provide information leading to Zea's killer. In September of that year, the police department released a facial composite seeking a supposed "key witness" in the case, but this man was never located.

On or about March 10, 1995, 45-year-old Kathleen Leonard, a nurse who worked at a hospital in Sarasota, stopped showing up to work. When she failed to turn up in the following days, one of her co-workers reported her missing to the police and a search began for her. When they checked the apartment, officers found Leonard's body in her bedroom. Her hands had been bound with a towel behind her back, and she appeared to have been strangled with terrycloth.

== Arrest, trial, and imprisonment ==
A week after Leonard's killing, Magaletti was arrested for burglary and robbery in relation to two separate incidents in which he had robbed a female acquaintance's house and had threatened to kill her. In the meantime, detectives investigating the crime scene of the Leonard murder found a strand of hair and palm prints that matched Magaletti, her neighbor at the time, but as this was not considered sufficient evidence for an arrest, he was not charged.

Five years later, the hair and a sample from Magaletti were sent to a laboratory in North Carolina, where they hoped that the advancements of DNA technology could help them. Using touch DNA analysis, it was confirmed that Magaletti had been present at the crime scene when Leonard had been murdered resulting in his subsequent arrest. While he vehemently denied responsibility, Magaletti would later be charged, convicted and sentenced to life imprisonment for the murder on June 15, 2001.

== Death and identification ==
After his trial, Magaletti was transferred to an undisclosed jail within Florida, where he served his life term until his eventual death on February 16, 2015. Six years later, authorities re-testing DNA from garments found at the scene of the Stafford murder uncovered a link to Magaletti, who worked at the same nightclub as her husband. Further investigations revealed that Magaletti likely knew his colleague's schedule, had visited their house on previous occasions and had apparently sold seat covers to Denise. Due to this, investigators concluded that this was sufficient evidence that would have led to an arrest if Magaletti was still alive.

Since his identification, authorities are now investigating the possibility that Magaletti might have been responsible for other crimes committed in Sarasota or other locations across the state. He additionally remains a suspect in the Zea case, which remains unsolved.
