= Dragones, Salta =

Coordinates: 23°15′S 63°21′W

Dragones (Salta)
- Municipality and village
- Interactive map of Dragones (Salta)
- Country: Argentina
- Province: Salta Province
- Time zone: UTC−3 (ART)

Dragones (Salta) is a village and rural municipality in Salta Province in northwestern Argentina.
