= Joseph Cafazzo =

Canadian biomedical engineer

Joseph Antony Cafazzo is a Canadian biomedical engineer, educator, and researcher.

He is known for his work on the design of health technologies and how they facilitate patient self-care of complex chronic conditions. He has advised and conducted research for public sector policy makers and private sector medical technology companies on the design and safety of healthcare technology.

He has led the Centre for Global eHealth Innovation since 2007 and founded Healthcare Human Factors in 2004 at the Toronto General Hospital, part of University Health Network. He is a Professor (status) at the Institute of Health Policy, Management and Evaluation at the University of Toronto.

He delivered Patient, Heal Thyself, a TEDxToronto talk in 2012 on empowering patients through improved design.

== Healthcare Human Factors ==
In 2004, he founded Healthcare Human Factors at University Health Network, which applies human factors engineering methods to problems of healthcare delivery and patient safety. As executive director of Healthcare Human Factors, his work has expanded to the analysis of user needs, the application of iterative and user-centered design, and evaluation of systems, tools, and environments.

== Centre for Global eHealth Innovation ==
Cafazzo leads the Centre for Global eHealth Innovation in Toronto, founded by Alex Jadad in 2004. The centre uses information and communication technologies to improve healthcare delivery, with a focus on recruiting multi-disciplinary individuals from backgrounds including the sciences, design, and technology.

In 2014, his team worked within the Institute of Electrical and Electronics Engineers Personal Health Devices Working Group to publish interoperability diabetes devices standards, defining communication protocols on how diabetes devices, such as insulin pumps, blood glucose meters, and continuous glucose monitors, communicate with one another and with other devices. By standardizing communication between devices, the protocols also accelerate the development of artificial pancreas systems.

In 2022 the Centre was renamed to The Centre for Digital Therapeutics.

== Research ==
Cafazzo has been routinely cited in the design and evaluation of health and medical technologies. In particular, his work on the barriers of patient adoption of dialysis technology, and his work on the design of mobile health application for the self-care of chronic illnesses such as diabetes, hypertension, and heart failure.

In radiation therapy, Cafazzo promoted the design of radiation systems with a user-centered approach and demonstrated the importance of human factors design principles.

Cafazzo advocates for the use of ethnography to inform the design of health technologies. Ethnography enables the translation of qualitative findings into design principles for the purpose of obtaining functional specifications, bridging the disciplines of qualitative research with that of engineering and software development.

== Awards ==
His work on diabetes self-care won the 2012 World Congress mHealth Innovation Conference's "People's Choice" award and the Stanford Medicine 2.0 award.

Cafazzo is also a recipient of the Career Scientist award by the Ministry of Health and Long-Term Care in recognition of his work in advancing patient self-care in the management of diabetes.

== Publications ==
- Logan, A. G; Irvine, M. J; McIsaac, W. J; Tisler, A; Rossos, P. G; Easty, A; Feig, D. S; Cafazzo, J. A (2012). "Effect of Home Blood Pressure Telemonitoring with Self-Care Support on Uncontrolled Systolic Hypertension in Diabetics". Hypertension. 60 (1): 51–7. doi:10.1161/HYPERTENSIONAHA.111.188409. PMID 22615116.
- Chan, Alvita J; Islam, Mohammad K; Rosewall, Tara; Jaffray, David A; Easty, Anthony C; Cafazzo, Joseph A (2010). "The use of human factors methods to identify and mitigate safety issues in radiation therapy". Radiotherapy and Oncology. 97 (3): 596–600. doi:10.1016/j.radonc.2010.09.026. PMID 21044802.
- Cafazzo, Joseph A; Leonard, Kevin; Easty, Anthony C; Rossos, Peter G; Chan, Christopher T (2010). "Patient perceptions of remote monitoring for nocturnal home hemodialysis". Hemodialysis International. 14 (4): 471–7. doi:10.1111/j.1542-4758.2010.00473.x. PMID 20955280. S2CID 5913872.
- Cafazzo, J. A; Leonard, K; Easty, A. C; Rossos, P. G; Chan, C. T (2009). "The user-centered approach in the development of a complex hospital-at-home intervention". Studies in Health Technology and Informatics. 143: 328–33. PMID 19380956.
- Cafazzo, J. A; Leonard, K; Easty, A. C; Rossos, P. G; Chan, C. T (2009). "Patient-Perceived Barriers to the Adoption of Nocturnal Home Hemodialysis". Clinical Journal of the American Society of Nephrology. 4 (4): 784–9. doi:10.2215/CJN.05501008. PMC 2666429. PMID 19339408.
- Cafazzo, Joseph A; Casselman, Mark; Hamming, Nathaniel; Katzman, Debra K; Palmert, Mark R (2012). "Design of an mHealth App for the Self-management of Adolescent Type 1 Diabetes: A Pilot Study". Journal of Medical Internet Research. 14 (3): e70. doi:10.2196/jmir.2058. PMC 3799540. PMID 22564332.
