= Dragoness =

Dragoness may refer to:

- Dragoness, a female dragon
- Dragoness (comics), a fictional mutant villain character in the Marvel Comics Universe
