= Joseph Carlisle McAlhany =

American politician

Member of the South Carolina House of Representatives
- In office 1961–1968
- In office 1971–1972

Personal details
- Born: June 8, 1915
- Died: July 1, 2005 (aged 90)
- Spouse: Judy Jewel Collins

Joseph Carlisle McAlhany (June 8, 1915 – July 1, 2005) was an American politician. He served as a member of the South Carolina House of Representatives.

== Life and career ==
McAlhany attended St. George High School.

In 1961, McAlhany was elected to the South Carolina House of Representatives, representing Dorchester County, South Carolina, serving until 1968. In 1971, he was re-elected.

McAlhany died in July 2005, at the age of 90.
