= Joseph C. Painter =

American politician from the state of Washington

Member of the Washington House of Representatives for the 12th district
- In office 1889–1893

Personal details
- Born: September 14, 1840 Missouri, United States
- Died: November 17, 1911 (aged 71) Walla Walla, Washington, United States
- Party: Republican

Joseph Clark Painter (September 14, 1840 – November 17, 1911) was an American politician in the state of Washington. A Republican, he served in the Washington House of Representatives from 1889 to 1893.
