= Joseph Hill Sinex =

American politician

Pennsylvania House of Representatives, Philadelphia County
- In office 1883–1884

Philadelphia City Council
- In office 1861–1861

Personal details
- Born: October 7, 1819 Stanton, Delaware, U.S.
- Died: October 6, 1892 (aged 72) Philadelphia, Pennsylvania, U.S.
- Resting place: Mount Moriah Cemetery, Philadelphia, Pennsylvania, U.S.
- Party: Republican
- Spouse: Mary C. Duffield

Military service
- Allegiance: United States
- Branch/service: Union Army
- Years of service: 1861–1864
- Rank: Captain; Lieutenant Colonel
- Commands: 17th Pennsylvania Infantry Regiment - Company D 91st Pennsylvania Infantry Regiment
- Battles/wars: American Civil War; Battle of Fredericksburg; Battle of Chancellorsville; Battle of Gettysburg; Battle of Spotsylvania Court House

Joseph Hill Sinex (October 7, 1819 – October 6, 1892) was an American politician from Pennsylvania who served as a member of the Philadelphia City Council in 1861 and as a Republican member of the Pennsylvania House of Representatives for Philadelphia County from 1883 to 1884.

He served as captain in the 17th Pennsylvania Infantry Regiment in 1861 and as captain and lieutenant colonel in the 91st Pennsylvania Infantry Regiment from 1861 to 1864. He fought in some of the key battles in the Eastern Theater of the American Civil War including the Battle of Fredericksburg, Battle of Chancellorsville, Battle of Gettysburg and was wounded at the Battle of Spotsylvania.

== Early life ==
Sinex was born on October 7, 1819, in Stanton, Delaware. He moved to Philadelphia and married Mary C. Duffield on October 29, 1848. Together they had six children, four that survived to adulthood. He worked as a house carpenter and builder.

== Military career ==
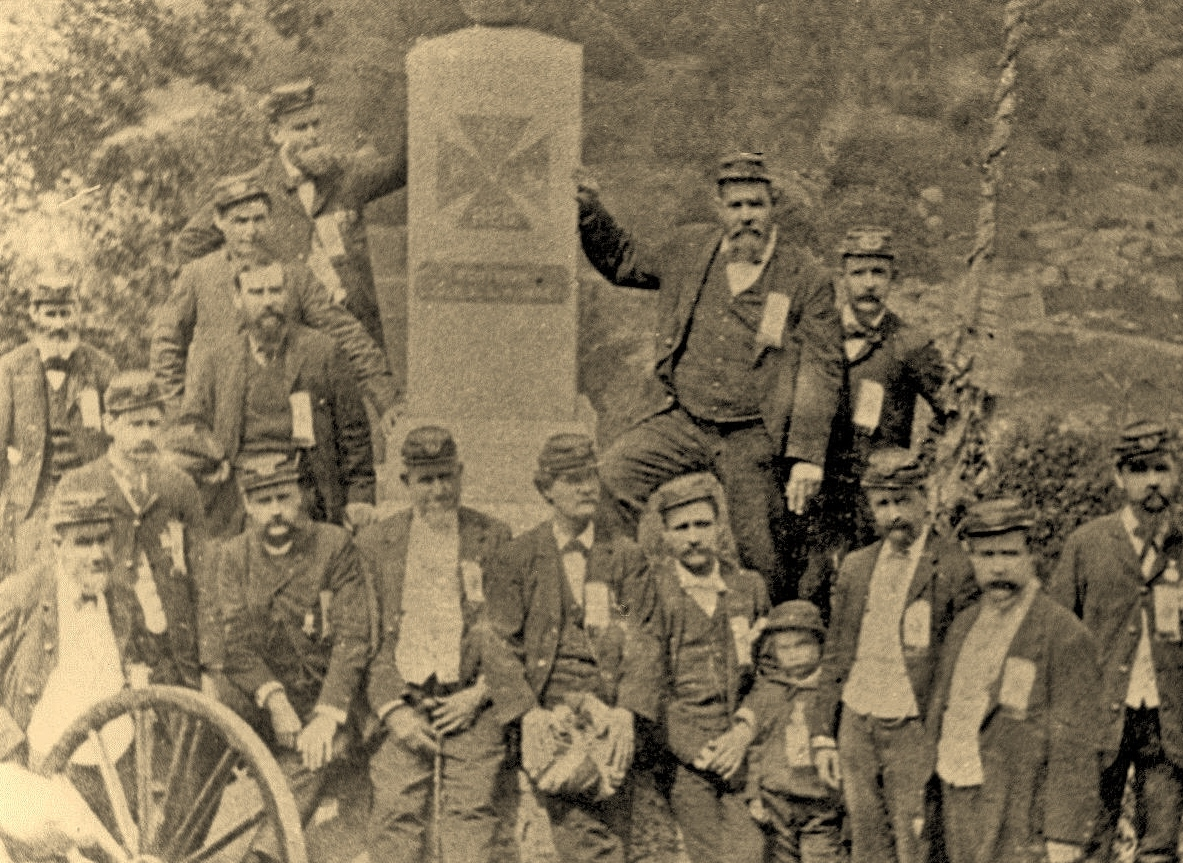
Lieutenant Colonel Joseph Hill Sinex (center, hand on monument) with former members of the 91st Pennsylvania Infantry Regiment at the regiment's monument at Little Round Top, Gettysburg National Military Park, c. 1889

He was mustered into service as captain of Company D of the Seventeenth Pennsylvania Infantry Regiment in April 1861 and was discharged in August. He joined the 91st Pennsylvania Infantry Regiment in December 1861. He fought at the Battle of Fredericksburg and the Battle of Chancellorsville. He was promoted to lieutenant colonel on July 10, 1864 and led 258 men at the Battle of Gettysburg and suffered the loss of 3 soldiers and 16 wounded in that battle. He was wounded at the Battle of Spotsylvania Court House and was mustered out of service on July 10, 1864 due to his wounds.

== Political career ==
He served as a member of the Philadelphia City Council in 1861 and as a Republican member of the Pennsylvania House of Representatives for Philadelphia County from 1883 to 1884.

He worked as a liquor dealer and hotel keeper. He died in Philadelphia on October 6, 1892, and was interred at Mount Moriah Cemetery.
