= Dragones de Ciudad Trujillo =

Former Dominican professional baseball team

Information
- League: Dominican Professional Baseball League
- Location: Santo Domingo, Dominican Republic
- Ballpark: Gimnasio Escolar
- Established: 1937
- Disbanded: 1937
- Nickname: Dragones Azules ("Blue Dragons")
- Ownership: Rafael Trujillo
- General manager: José Enrique Aybar
- Manager: Burrulote Rodríguez

Dragones de Ciudad Trujillo were a professional baseball team in the Dominican Republic that played a single season in 1937. The club was the result of a temporary merger between two existing teams, Tigres del Licey and Leones del Escogido, in the capital of Santo Domingo (then officially known as "Ciudad Trujillo" in honor of dictator Rafael Trujillo). The 1937 squad included several Negro league baseball players from the United States, and is considered one of the strongest baseball teams in Dominican history. However the team's exorbitant contracts directly led to the collapse of professional baseball in the country, which would not be re-established until the modern Dominican Professional Baseball League (LIDOM) was founded in 1951.

== History ==
As more import players signed with Dragones, it caused a massive jump in the league's average pay. At the outset of the 1937 campaign, the average Dominican ballplayer earned 24 pesos a month, and a regular foreigner between 50 and 150. But as the campaign progressed, Trujillo resorted to extravagant salaries to attract American Negro leaguers. An agent of Trujillo approached Satchel Paige, offering him $6,000 to play in the league and an extra $24,000 to dole out to recruit players on the Paige's Negro league team, the Pittsburgh Crawfords. Josh Gibson and Cool Papa Bell were among six Dragones players to be paid $3,000 for five weeks of play.

In the Dominican Republic, the American players were shadowed by armed guards. Although the purpose of the guards was to protect the players, the players were fearful that Trujillo would unleash them in anger if his team lost the championship.

=== Roster ===
1937 Dragones de Ciudad Trujillo
Roster
Pitchers: (United States) Satchel Paige; (United States) Leroy Matlock; (United States) Robert Griffin; (Cuba) Rodolfo Fernández; (Dominican Republic) Gustavo Lluberes; (Dominican Republic) Ernesto Sánchez	Catchers: (United States) Cy Perkins; (Dominican Republic) Enrique Lantigua; (Dominican Republic) Luis Saint Claire; (United States) Josh Gibson; Infielders: (Dominican Republic) Francisco Rodríguez; (Dominican Republic) Checo Delgado; (Cuba) Lázaro Salazar (cpt); (Puerto Rico) Pedro Cepeda; (Cuba) Miguel Solís; (Cuba) Rafael Quintana; (United States) Harry Williams; (Cuba) Silvio García; (Dominican Republic) José Dolores Pérez; (Cuba) Francisco Correa; (United States) Sam Bankhead	Outfielders: (Cuba) José Julio Vargas; (Cuba) Tony Castaño; (United States) Cool Papa Bell; (Dominican Republic) Pedro Nina; (Dominican Republic) Rafael Alvarado; (Puerto Rico) Pancho Coimbre; (United States) Herman Andrews	Manager: (Dominican Republic) Burrulote Rodríguez; Source: Licey.com
