= Joe Kehoskie =

American baseball consultant and executive

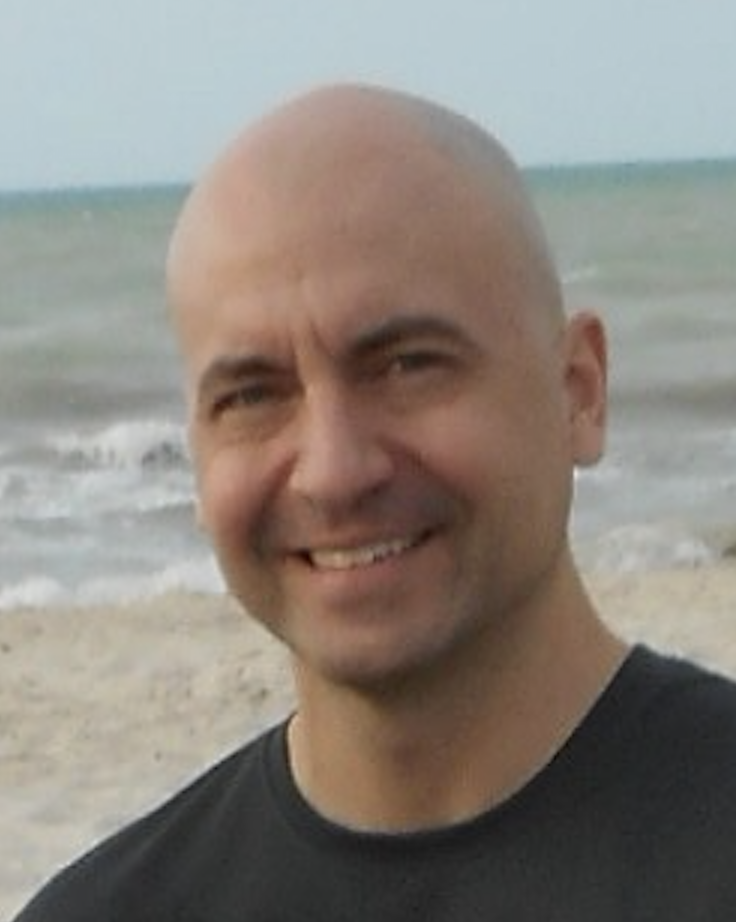
- Kehoskie in 2015
- Born: January 18, 1973 (age 53); Auburn, New York, U.S.
- Occupations: Baseball consultant Baseball executive
- Years active: 1984–present
- Height: 6 ft 3 in (1.91 m)
- Website: Joe Kehoskie Baseball

Joe Kehoskie /ˌkiːˈoʊskiː/ (born January 18, 1973) is an American baseball consultant, executive, and entrepreneur. He has worked in professional baseball in a variety of capacities since 1984, formerly working in minor league baseball (1984–1994) and as a player agent (1996–2011).

Kehoskie is often quoted in the media as an expert on baseball-related topics, particularly baseball in Latin America. He has made national TV appearances on outlets including ESPN, CBC, Al Jazeera English, and PBS, and been interviewed on radio networks including ESPN Radio, CBC Radio, NPR, and WFAN.

== Early life ==
Kehoskie was born and raised in Auburn, New York, a small city 25 miles southwest of Syracuse in the Finger Lakes region of central New York.

He is a 1990 graduate of Auburn High School, from which he graduated in three years.

== Professional baseball career ==
=== Minor leagues (1984–1994) ===
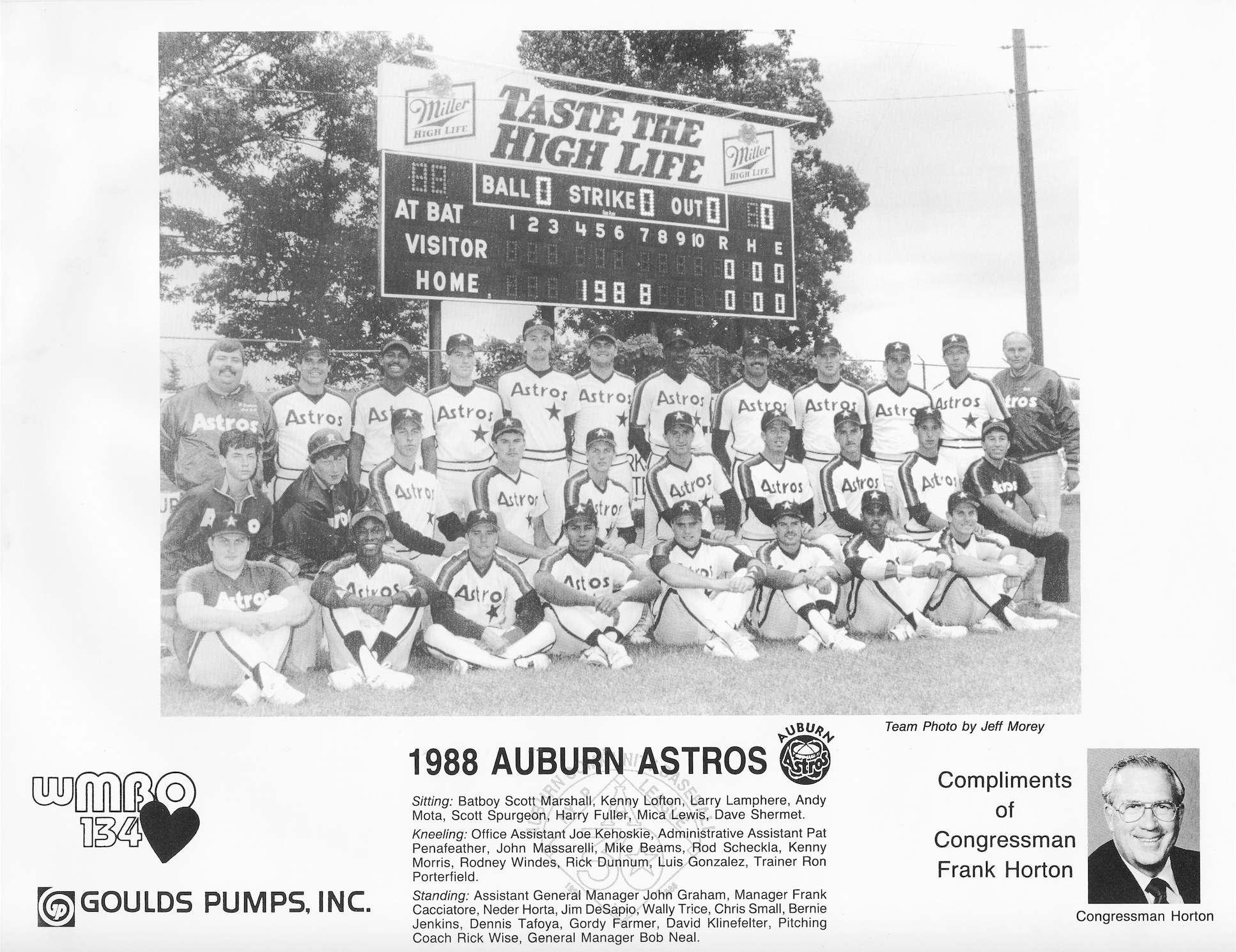
1988 Auburn Astros team photo

Kehoskie was hired as a batboy by his hometown Auburn Astros, then the short-season Class A affiliate of the Houston Astros, in 1984 at age 11. He worked for the team through 1991 in a variety of roles including office assistant, official scorer, and clubhouse manager. From 1989 to 1991, he also covered the team as a correspondent for The Citizen, Auburn's daily newspaper.

In early 1992, Kehoskie was hired by the Rochester Red Wings, then the Triple-A affiliate of the Baltimore Orioles, where he was a member of a staff that included Joe Altobelli, Russ Brandon, Josh Lewin, Bob Socci, and Glenn Geffner. He worked for the Red Wings until late 1994.

=== Player agent (1996–2011) ===
Kehoskie worked in the Minor Leagues for 11 years to become a Major League Baseball general manager. However, he found entry-level opportunities in MLB to be limited in the years during and after the 1994–95 baseball strike, which had caused cutbacks throughout the sport. After failing to land a job with an MLB team and wanting to remain in baseball in a job involving baseball operations and scouting, he started working as a player agent in 1996.

Kehoskie has been the president and CEO of Joe Kehoskie Baseball since 1996. One of his earliest clients was left-handed pitcher Brad Pennington, who had pitched for the Rochester Red Wings when Kehoskie worked for the team.

In 1998, Kehoskie was asked to represent a group of five Cuban defectors in Costa Rica, who became the first of approximately two dozen Cuban players he represented.

Aside from Cuban defectors, Kehoskie has worked extensively in Latin America, including the representation of players from the Dominican Republic and Venezuela. Among the notable players Kehoskie has advised or represented are José Bautista and Félix Hernández.

== Media appearances ==
Since the late 1990s, Kehoskie has been quoted frequently in the media on baseball-related topics, including Cuban defectors, baseball in Cuba, and the use of PEDs in Latin America.

In 2000, Kehoskie accurately predicted a record $30 million contract for Cuban pitcher José Contreras more than two and a half years before Contreras left Cuba.

In 2008, Kehoskie told author Michael Lewis, "There’s at least half a billion dollars of baseball players in Cuba right now and probably a lot more." By the end of 2014, approximately 30 subsequent Cuban defectors had signed MLB contracts totaling just under $500 million.

In 2009, Kehoskie said Cuban defector Aroldis Chapman "might have more upside than any pitcher on the planet" but would struggle to become an MLB starting pitcher. After signing with the Cincinnati Reds for over $30 million, Chapman was moved to the bullpen before he had started a single game in the major leagues.

=== Print and online ===
Kehoskie has been quoted several hundred times in print and online media outlets including the New York Times, Los Angeles Times, Washington Post, Miami Herald, ESPN.com, and Vanity Fair. He has also been quoted in more than a half-dozen books.

=== Radio and podcasts ===
Kehoskie has been interviewed on the radio by, among others, Cindy Brunson on ESPN Radio, Adam Schein on WFAN, George Stroumboulopoulos on CBC Radio, Greg Allen on NPR's All Things Considered, and John Hockenberry on WNYC's The Takeaway.

=== Television ===
Kehoskie was featured in a 2001 episode of ESPN's Outside the Lines series and has made many other national and international TV appearances:

Year	Show	Episode	Topic
2001	Stealing Home		Cuban baseball defectors
2001	ESPN Outside the Lines Primetime	"Witness to a Defection"	Cuban baseball, MLB
2002	ESPN Outside the Lines Sunday	"Holding an Ace"	José Contreras, MLB
2006	ESPN Outside the Lines Nightly	"Risky Road Trip"	2006 WBC, Cuban baseball
2006	CBC News: The Hour	March 9, 2006	2006 WBC, Cuban baseball
2007	Al Jazeera English	June 19, 2007	Baseball in the D.R.
2014	Issues Reports	"Smuggling: Baseball's Open Secret"	Cuban baseball, MLB
2015	Outside the Lines	"Cuba on Deck?"	Cuban baseball, MLB
2015	SportsCenter	April 19, 2015	Cuban baseball, MLB
2015	CBC News: Toronto	July 15, 2015	
2015	CTV News Channel	July 26, 2015	Cuban baseball defectors, MLB
2016	CTV News Channel	August 8, 2016	Alex Rodriguez retires from MLB

== Personal life ==
Kehoskie has lived in central New York; Miami, Florida; and Mérida, Yucatán, Mexico.
