= Joseph Vijay (guitarist) =

Indian guitarist (born 1974)

- Born: Joseph Vijay; May 8, 1974 (age 52)
- Origin: Chennai, Tamil Nadu, India
- Genres: Acoustics; jazz; rock; contemporary R&B; blues rock; funk; gospel; pop
- Occupation: Guitarist
- Instruments: Acoustic guitar; bass guitar; electric bass; electric guitar
- Years active: 2007–present

Joseph Vijay (born 8 May 1974) is an Indian lead guitarist from Chennai, Tamil Nadu. He plays guitar mainly in genres such as jazz, rock music, and contemporary R&B styles of music. He works on musical soundtracks for Bollywood, Sandalwood (cinema), Tollywood (Telugu), and Kollywood Movies.

== Biography ==
Joseph Vijay was born in Chennai, Tamil Nadu, India. He is the eldest of four children. He was educated at St. Anglo Indian Higher Secondary School, Chennai, Tamil Nadu. He married Camy D'Silva on 30 June 1999 and has two daughters, Sheena Joseph and Sarina Joseph. He cultivated a love for guitar at age of five, and his father was his first guru, who taught him the basics of playing the guitar. He started playing in church choirs for gospel songs when he was 11 years old. His passion for the guitar grew, and he started composing his own tunes, which he played in churches. Once a member of a band, he is now a solo artist. He works on experimental musics.

== Musical career ==
Joseph Vijay, also known as Vijay Joseph (a.k.a. VJ), joined his first band, "Acanthus" which has an official website called "Vin Sinners" between 1991 and 1994. Vinesh 'Vin' Nair formed the Dubai rock band Vin Sinners, which was Acanthus when he first started in Chennai. Vinesh Nair had once mentioned in the news paper about Joseph Vijay (Vijay Joseph, a.k.a. VJ), that Nair said fans can expect to hear diverse genres. "You will hear some exceptional players. Many of them are members of leading bands, but the guy to watch out for is VJ. He has done some major gigs across the world and has even worked on movies with AR Rahman." After which joined Raghu Dixit Project. He has also made his first move on creating his teaching of guitar on Dailymotions.com, which was even sold on Amazon and on various websites. The turning point was when he started his musical journey with Raghu Dixit Project, a multilingual folk band from 2007 to 2011. Alcheringa at IIT Guwahati was his first concert with Raghu in the same year (2007). Later, he has performed at various music festivals and live concerts, such as "Lungi Rock" with Raghu Dixit. In 2010, he appeared on BBC TV's Later... with Jools Holland with RaghuDixit. Guitar Virtuosos was to play in Dubai, where Joseph Vijay hosted the show called "Lord of Strings" in 2016 which was also published in famous Dubai news paper Khaleej Times. Lord of Strings is a show where guitarists from Syria, Jordan, and India came together, and Joseph Vijay and his fans also addressed him. Vijay Joseph was the host. This was the first time he performed in UAE, "You know, I have friends and family in Dubai, but I didn't know the city has so many talented musicians. I'm looking forward to sharing stage with some of them," VJ said to the newspaper. He has performed with a great number of artist, like Karthik, Vijay Prakash, Andrea Jeremiah, Sean Roldan, Vijay Yesudas, and Shakthisree Gopalan. He is working with famous music directors like Harris Jayaraj, Santhosh Narayanan Leon James, and for the song "Usure Usure" for the movie Karuppan for music director D. Imman. He has also worked on many own composing albums like "Pure Nature Sounds". He also has sensationals on Apple iTunes. He has done various live concerts and stages shows and has given a fever of music with his tunes. Recently, he also played nylon guitars for the song "Kannamma" from the movie Kaala (2018 film).

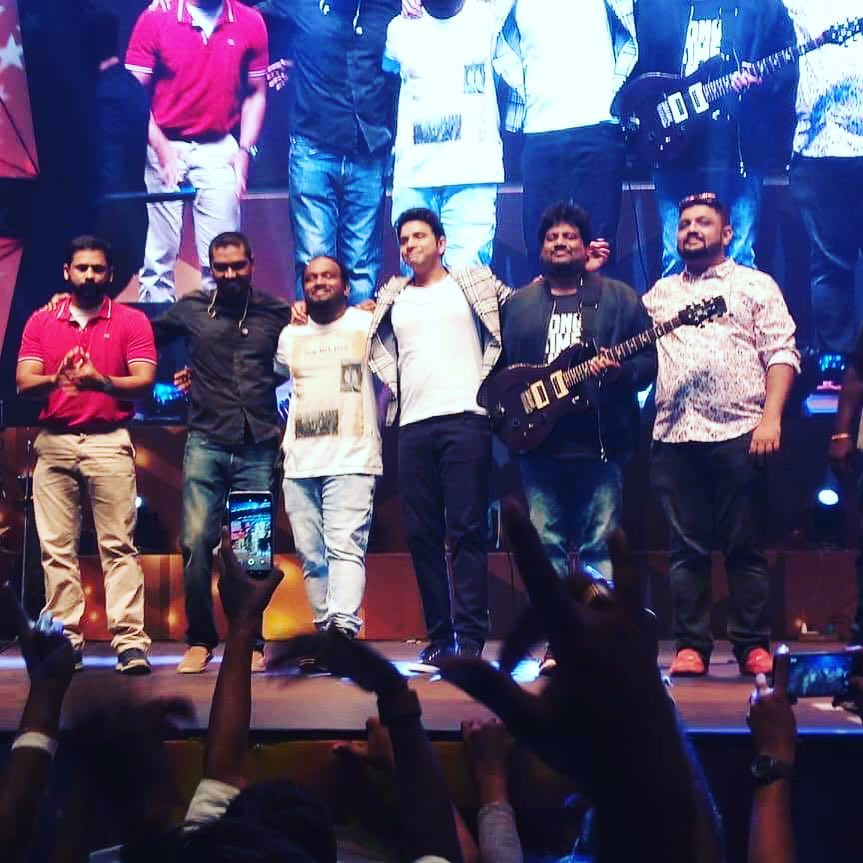
With singer Karthik

== Concerts ==
- Roots Festival, North East.
- NH Weekender, Mumbai.
- Coke Studio and Dewarist live Concerts in 2011.
- Coke Studio Live Jalander
- "Waiting for Miracle" with Raghu Dixit Session on BBC Radio.
- Isha Foundation "MahaShivarathri 2018"
- Karthik and Friends US tour June 2018

== Filmography ==
- Hebbuli
- Kaala (2018 film)
- Veera (2018 film)
- Chakravarthy (2017 film)
- Iru Mugan
- Kabali (film)
- Sethupathi (film)
- Meesaya Murukku
- Kaashmora
- Irudhi Suttru
- Madras (film)
- Mungaru Male 2
- Chowka
- Mujhse Fraaandship Karoge
- Kavalai Vendam
- Tagaru
- Bairavaa
- Natpe Thunai
