= 2026–27 LIDOM season =

2026–27 Dominican Professional Baseball League season
- League: LIDOM
- Sport: Baseball
- Duration: 16 October 2026 –
- Games: 50 games (Serie Regular); 18 games (Serie Semifinal); Best-of-seven (Serie Final)
- Teams: 6
- Streaming partner: MLB.tv (United States)

Serie Regular

Serie Final

Seasons
- ← 2025–26 2027–28 →

The 2026–27 Dominican Professional Baseball League season is the 59th consecutive season of winter league baseball in the Dominican Republic, and 72nd overall season. The regular season started on 16 October 2026 until 22 December 2026. BanReservas continues as the main sponsor. The season is dedicated in memory of Dominican businessman Héctor José Rizek Llabaly.

Leones del Escogido are two-time defending champions, having won their 18th championship the previous season.

== Competition format ==
Each team plays a 50-game regular season schedule (Serie Regular). The top four teams in the standings then play an 18-game round-robin playoff format (Serie Semifinal), to determine the top two teams that will play the Serie Final. The Serie Final is set to be a best-of-seven series to determined the season champion who will represent the Dominican Republic at the 2027 Caribbean Series.

== Season review ==
On 21 October 2026, the Tigres del Licey completed a seven-pitcher no-hitter against the Toros del Este in a 3–0 victory at the Estadio Francisco Micheli.

== Teams ==
LIDOM teams locations.

=== Team Locations ===
Cap Insignia	Team	City	Stadium	Capacity	Founded	Manager	League Titles
	Águilas Cibaeñas	Santiago de los Caballeros	Estadio Cibao	18,077	1933	(Venezuela) Francisco Cervelli	22
	Estrellas Orientales	San Pedro de Macorís	Estadio Tetelo Vargas	8,000	1910	(Dominican Republic) Héctor Borg	3
	Gigantes del Cibao	San Francisco de Macorís	Estadio Julian Javier	12,000	1996	(Venezuela) Miguel Cairo	2
	Leones del Escogido	Santo Domingo	Estadio Quisqueya Juan Marichal	13,186	1921	(Dominican Republic) Ramón Santiago	18
	Tigres del Licey	Santo Domingo	Estadio Quisqueya Juan Marichal	13,186	1907	(Dominican Republic) Gilbert Gómez	24
	Toros del Este	La Romana	Estadio Francisco Micheli	8,838	1983	(Dominican Republic) Víctor Estévez	3

=== Managerial changes ===
Team	Former Manager	Reason	New Manager	Date	Source
Estrellas Orientales	(Dominican Republic) Carlos Paulino	End of interim	(Dominican Republic) Héctor Borg	Offseason	
Gigantes del Cibao	(Dominican Republic) Jefry Sierra	End of interim	(Venezuela) Miguel Cairo	Offseason	
Águilas Cibaeñas	(Colombia) Luis Urueta	Fired	(Venezuela) Francisco Cervelli	19 November 2026	

== Serie Regular ==
Each team plays 50 games in the regular season. A team's schedule is organized into 10 games versus each opponent, respectively, with 5 games at home and 5 games away against the same opponent from 16 October 2026, to 22 December 2026.

=== Standings ===
As of 22 November 2026

Team	GP	W	L	PCT.	GB	Home	Road	STK	RS	RA	DIFF.	Qualification
Tigres del Licey	28	17	11	.607	–	8-6	9–5	W3	148	113	35	Qualification to Serie Semifinal
Leones del Escogido	28	17	11	.607	–	8-6	9–5	L3	149	135	14	Qualification to Serie Semifinal
Estrellas Orientales	28	16	12	.571	1	7-7	9–5	W7	142	129	13	Qualification to Serie Semifinal
Gigantes del Cibao	28	15	13	.536	2	9-6	6–7	W3	152	162	-10	Qualification to Serie Semifinal
Toros del Este	28	10	18	.357	7	5-9	5–9	L2	142	176	-34	
Águilas Cibaeñas	28	9	19	.321	8	5-8	4–11	L6	124	142	-18	

=== Head to head ===
2026-27 Serie Regular record vs. opponents Source: LIDOM Standings Grid – 2026-27
Team	AC	EO	GC	LE	TL	TE
Águilas Cibaeñas	—	2-5	1-5	0-4	3-3	3-3
Estrellas Orientales	5-2	—	6-0	2-4	2-3	2-3
Gigantes del Cibao	5-1	0-6	—	4-2	3-3	3-1
Leones del Escogido	4-0	4-2	2-4	—	2-3	5-2
Tigres del Licey	2-3	3-2	3-3	3-3	—	5-1
Toros del Este	3-3	3-2	1-3	2-5	1-5	—

=== Schedule ===
Time zone: UTC−04:00

Week 1 – 16 October to 18 October
Date	Time	Road team	Result	Home team	Stadium
16 October 2026	7:00 p.m.	Águilas Cibaeñas	1–4	Gigantes del Cibao	Estadio Julian Javier
16 October 2026	7:15 p.m.	Tigres del Licey	12–2	Leones del Escogido	Estadio Quisqueya Juan Marichal
16 October 2026	7:30 p.m.	Estrellas Orientales	11–0	Toros del Este	Estadio Francisco Micheli
17 October 2026	5:00 p.m.	Gigantes del Cibao	7–1	Tigres del Licey	Estadio Quisqueya Juan Marichal
17 October 2026	6:00 p.m.	Toros del Este	5–3	Águilas Cibaeñas	Estadio Cibao
17 October 2026	7:30 p.m.	Leones del Escogido	3–8	Estrellas Orientales	Estadio Tetelo Vargas
18 October 2026	5:00 p.m.	Leones del Escogido	4–5 (10)	Tigres del Licey	Estadio Quisqueya Juan Marichal
18 October 2026	5:00 p.m.	Gigantes del Cibao	1–4	Águilas Cibaeñas	Estadio Cibao
18 October 2026	5:00 p.m.	Toros del Este	6–4	Estrellas Orientales	Estadio Tetelo Vargas

Week 2 – 19 October to 25 October
Date	Time	Road team	Result	Home team	Stadium
20 October 2026	7:00 p.m.	Tigres del Licey	14–1	Gigantes del Cibao	Estadio Julian Javier
20 October 2026	7:15 p.m.	Estrellas Orientales	3–5	Leones del Escogido	Estadio Quisqueya Juan Marichal
20 October 2026	7:30 p.m.	Águilas Cibaeñas	4–7	Toros del Este	Estadio Francisco Micheli
21 October 2026	7:15 p.m.	Gigantes del Cibao	14–9	Leones del Escogido	Estadio Quisqueya Juan Marichal
21 October 2026	7:30 p.m.	Estrellas Orientales	Postponed (Note: Game postponed in the bottom of 2nd inning due to rain.)	Águilas Cibaeñas	Estadio Cibao
21 October 2026	7:30 p.m.	Tigres del Licey	3–0 (Note: No-hitter completed by Tigres del Licey.)	Toros del Este	Estadio Francisco Micheli
22 October 2026	7:00 p.m.	Toros del Este	6–7 (10)	Gigantes del Cibao	Estadio Julian Javier
23 October 2026	7:15 p.m.	Águilas Cibaeñas	5–9	Leones del Escogido	Estadio Quisqueya Juan Marichal
23 October 2026	7:30 p.m.	Tigres del Licey	3–8	Estrellas Orientales	Estadio Tetelo Vargas
24 October 2026	4:00 p.m.	Toros del Este	0–2	Leones del Escogido	Estadio Quisqueya Juan Marichal
24 October 2026	6:00 p.m.	Tigres del Licey	6–2	Águilas Cibaeñas	Estadio Cibao
24 October 2026	7:30 p.m.	Gigantes del Cibao	11–12	Estrellas Orientales	Estadio Tetelo Vargas
25 October 2026	5:00 p.m.	Águilas Cibaeñas	9–5	Tigres del Licey	Estadio Quisqueya Juan Marichal
25 October 2026	5:00 p.m.	Estrellas Orientales	12–6	Gigantes del Cibao	Estadio Julian Javier
25 October 2026	5:00 p.m.	Leones del Escogido	15–11	Toros del Este	Estadio Francisco Micheli

Week 3 – 26 October to 1 November
Date	Time	Road team	Result	Home team	Stadium
26 October 2026 (Note: Game rescheduled from 21 October 2026, to start in the bottom of 2nd inning.)	7:15 p.m.	Estrellas Orientales	Postponed (Note: Game postponed due to rain.)	Águilas Cibaeñas	Estadio Cibao
27 October 2026	7:00 p.m.	Leones del Escogido	Postponed (Note: All games postponed due to rain.)	Gigantes del Cibao	Estadio Julian Javier
27 October 2026	7:30 p.m.	Águilas Cibaeñas	Postponed	Estrellas Orientales	Estadio Tetelo Vargas
27 October 2026	7:30 p.m.	Toros del Este	Postponed	Tigres del Licey	Estadio Quisqueya Juan Marichal
28 October 2026	7:30 p.m.	Gigantes del Cibao	0–6	Toros del Este	Estadio Francisco Micheli
28 October 2026	7:30 p.m.	Leones del Escogido	6–3	Águilas Cibaeñas	Estadio Cibao
28 October 2026	9:00 p.m. (Note: Originally scheduled to 7:30 p.m. - delayed due to rain.)	Estrellas Orientales	0–3	Tigres del Licey	Estadio Quisqueya Juan Marichal
29 October 2026	7:00 p.m.	Leones del Escogido	15–8	Gigantes del Cibao	Estadio Julian Javier
29 October 2026	7:30 p.m.	Águilas Cibaeñas	5–2 (11)	Estrellas Orientales	Estadio Tetelo Vargas
29 October 2026	7:30 p.m.	Toros del Este	4–7	Tigres del Licey	Estadio Quisqueya Juan Marichal
30 October 2026	7:00 p.m.	Tigres del Licey	1–5 (5) (Note: Game called due to rain in the bottom of the 5th inning.)	Gigantes del Cibao	Estadio Julian Javier
30 October 2026	7:30 p.m.	Estrellas Orientales	0–2	Leones del Escogido	Estadio Quisqueya Juan Marichal
30 October 2026	7:30 p.m.	Águilas Cibaeñas	0–3	Toros del Este	Estadio Francisco Micheli
31 October 2026	5:00 p.m.	Estrellas Orientales	3–6	Tigres del Licey	Estadio Quisqueya Juan Marichal
31 October 2026	6:00 p.m.	Leones del Escogido	4–1	Águilas Cibaeñas	Estadio Cibao
31 October 2026	7:30 p.m.	Gigantes del Cibao	6–5	Toros del Este	Estadio Francisco Micheli
1 November 2026	5:00 p.m.	Toros del Este	7–13	Gigantes del Cibao	Estadio Julian Javier
1 November 2026	5:00 p.m.	Águilas Cibaeñas	1–2	Leones del Escogido	Estadio Quisqueya Juan Marichal
1 November 2026	5:00 p.m.	Tigres del Licey	2–1	Estrellas Orientales	Estadio Tetelo Vargas

Week 4 – 2 November to 8 November
Date	Time	Road team	Result	Home team	Stadium
2 November 2026 (Note: Game rescheduled from 21 October 2026 (rain), and 26 October 2026 (rain), to start in the bottom of 2nd inning.)	7:30 p.m.	Estrellas Orientales	Postponed (Note: Game postponed due to rain.)	Águilas Cibaeñas	Estadio Cibao
3 November 2026	7:15 p.m.	Toros del Este	4–6	Leones del Escogido	Estadio Quisqueya Juan Marichal
3 November 2026	7:30 p.m.	Gigantes del Cibao	3–5	Estrellas Orientales	Estadio Tetelo Vargas
3 November 2026	7:30 p.m.	Tigres del Licey	3–8	Águilas Cibaeñas	Estadio Cibao
4 November 2026	7:15 p.m.	Gigantes del Cibao	1–5	Leones del Escogido	Estadio Quisqueya Juan Marichal
4 November 2026	7:30 p.m.	Estrellas Orientales	12–7 (10)	Águilas Cibaeñas	Estadio Cibao
4 November 2026	7:30 p.m.	Tigres del Licey	9–5	Toros del Este	Estadio Francisco Micheli
6 November 2026	7:00 p.m.	Leones del Escogido	4–5	Gigantes del Cibao	Estadio Julian Javier
6 November 2026	7:30 p.m.	Águilas Cibaeñas	11–2	Estrellas Orientales	Estadio Tetelo Vargas
6 November 2026	7:30 p.m.	Toros del Este	7–5	Tigres del Licey	Estadio Quisqueya Juan Marichal
7 November 2026	5:00 p.m.	Gigantes del Cibao	3–8	Tigres del Licey	Estadio Quisqueya Juan Marichal
7 November 2026	6:00 p.m.	Toros del Este	6–13	Águilas Cibaeñas	Estadio Cibao
7 November 2026	7:30 p.m.	Leones del Escogido	6–4	Estrellas Orientales	Estadio Tetelo Vargas
8 November 2026	5:00 p.m.	Estrellas Orientales	4–5 (10)	Toros del Este	Estadio Francisco Micheli
8 November 2026	5:00 p.m.	Águilas Cibaeñas	0–3 (6) (Note: Game called due to rain in the top of the 6th inning.)	Gigantes del Cibao	Estadio Julian Javier
8 November 2026	5:00 p.m.	Tigres del Licey	5–4	Leones del Escogido	Estadio Quisqueya Juan Marichal

Week 5 – 9 November to 15 November
Date	Time	Road team	Result	Home team	Stadium
9 November 2026	5:00 p.m.	Estrellas Orientales	6–3	Gigantes del Cibao	Estadio Julian Javier
9 November 2026	5:00 p.m.	Leones del Escogido	5–2	Toros del Este	Estadio Francisco Micheli
9 November 2026	5:00 p.m.	Águilas Cibaeñas	6–8	Tigres del Licey	Estadio Quisqueya Juan Marichal
10 November 2026	7:30 p.m.	Toros del Este	Postponed (Note: Game postponed due to rain.)	Águilas Cibaeñas	Estadio Cibao
10 November 2026	7:30 p.m.	Leones del Escogido	10–2	Estrellas Orientales	Estadio Tetelo Vargas
10 November 2026	7:30 p.m.	Gigantes del Cibao	5–4 (11)	Tigres del Licey	Estadio Quisqueya Juan Marichal
11 November 2026	7:15 p.m.	Toros del Este	6–5	Leones del Escogido	Estadio Quisqueya Juan Marichal
11 November 2026	7:30 p.m.	Gigantes del Cibao	6–8	Estrellas Orientales	Estadio Tetelo Vargas
11 November 2026	7:30 p.m.	Tigres del Licey	2–3	Águilas Cibaeñas	Estadio Cibao
12 November 2026 (Note: Game rescheduled from 10 November 2026.)	7:30 p.m.	Toros del Este	4–7	Águilas Cibaeñas	Estadio Cibao
13 November 2026	7:00 p.m.	Águilas Cibaeñas	6–9	Gigantes del Cibao	Estadio Julian Javier
13 November 2026	7:30 p.m.	Toros del Este	12–6 (10)	Estrellas Orientales	Estadio Tetelo Vargas
13 November 2026	7:30 p.m.	Leones del Escogido	5–3	Tigres del Licey	Estadio Quisqueya Juan Marichal
14 November 2026	4:00 p.m.	Estrellas Orientales	4–2	Leones del Escogido	Estadio Quisqueya Juan Marichal
14 November 2026	5:00 p.m.	Tigres del Licey	7–4	Gigantes del Cibao	Estadio Julian Javier
14 November 2026	7:30 p.m.	Águilas Cibaeñas	4–2	Toros del Este	Estadio Francisco Micheli
15 November 2026	5:00 p.m.	Estrellas Orientales	6–5	Toros del Este	Estadio Francisco Micheli
15 November 2026	5:00 p.m.	Gigantes del Cibao	Postponed (Note: Game postponed in the bottom of the 3rd inning due to rain.)	Águilas Cibaeñas	Estadio Cibao
15 November 2026	5:00 p.m.	Leones del Escogido	4–2	Tigres del Licey	Estadio Quisqueya Juan Marichal

Week 6 – 16 November to 22 November
Date	Time	Road team	Result	Home team	Stadium
16 November 2026 (Note: Game rescheduled from 21 October 2026 (rain), 26 October 2026 (rain), 2 November 2026 (rain), to start in the bottom of 2nd inning.)	7:30 p.m.	Estrellas Orientales	3–2	Águilas Cibaeñas	Estadio Cibao
17 November 2026	7:00 p.m.	Águilas Cibaeñas	8–9 (11)	Gigantes del Cibao	Estadio Julian Javier
17 November 2026	7:15 p.m.	Toros del Este	10–11	Leones del Escogido	Estadio Quisqueya Juan Marichal
17 November 2026	7:30 p.m.	Tigres del Licey	1–2 (10)	Estrellas Orientales	Estadio Tetelo Vargas
18 November 2026	7:00 p.m.	Estrellas Orientales	2–1	Gigantes del Cibao	Estadio Julian Javier
18 November 2026	7:30 p.m.	Leones del Escogido	2–7	Toros del Este	Estadio Francisco Micheli
18 November 2026	7:30 p.m.	Águilas Cibaeñas	4–5	Tigres del Licey	Estadio Quisqueya Juan Marichal
20 November 2026	7:15 p.m.	Gigantes del Cibao	3–0	Leones del Escogido	Estadio Quisqueya Juan Marichal
20 November 2026	7:30 p.m.	Estrellas Orientales	9–2	Águilas Cibaeñas	Estadio Cibao
20 November 2026	7:30 p.m.	Tigres del Licey	8–4	Toros del Este	Estadio Francisco Micheli
21 November 2026	5:00 p.m.	Leones del Escogido	2–6	Gigantes del Cibao	Estadio Julian Javier
21 November 2026	5:00 p.m.	Toros del Este	3–10	Tigres del Licey	Estadio Quisqueya Juan Marichal
21 November 2026	7:30 p.m.	Águilas Cibaeñas	1–3	Estrellas Orientales	Estadio Tetelo Vargas
22 November 2026	3:00 p.m. (Note: Game rescheduled from 15 November 2026, to start in bottom of 3rd inning.)	Gigantes del Cibao	8–4	Águilas Cibaeñas	Estadio Cibao
22 November 2026	5:00 p.m.	Toros del Este		Estrellas Orientales	Estadio Tetelo Vargas
22 November 2026	5:00 p.m.	Leones del Escogido		Tigres del Licey	Estadio Quisqueya Juan Marichal
22 November 2026	5:30 p.m.	Gigantes del Cibao		Águilas Cibaeñas	Estadio Cibao

Week 7 – 23 November to 29 November
Date	Time	Road team	Result	Home team	Stadium

Week 8 – 30 November to 6 December
Date	Time	Road team	Result	Home team	Stadium

Week 9 – 7 December to 13 December
Date	Time	Road team	Result	Home team	Stadium

Week 10 – 14 December to 22 December
Date	Time	Road team	Result	Home team	Stadium

=== Statistics ===
As of 16 November 2026

Hitting leaders
Stat	Player	Total
AVG	(Dominican Republic) Vidal Bruján (LE)	.361
HR	Five tied	4
RBI	(Dominican Republic) Raimel Tapia (EO)	18
R	Two tied	21
H	(Dominican Republic) Gustavo Núñez (TL)	32
SB	(Dominican Republic) Gilberto Celestino (TE)	15

Pitching leaders
Stat	Player	Total
W	(United States) Kelly Austin (LE)	4
L	(United States) Jackson Goddard (GC)	4
ERA	(Dominican Republic) Albert Abreu (TL)	1.71
K	(Cuba) Vladimir Gutiérrez (TL)	24
IP	(Cuba) Vladimir Gutiérrez (TL)	23.1
SV	(Dominican Republic) Robinson Martínez (LE)	8

=== Weekly Awards ===
As of 18 November 2026

Players of the Week
Week	Position	Pitcher	Source
Week 1	(Dominican Republic) Raimel Tapia (EO)	(United States) Reid VanScoter (LE)	
Week 2	(United States) José Marmolejos (LE)	(Dominican Republic) J. C. Mejía (TL)	
Week 3	(Dominican Republic) Vidal Bruján (LE)	(Dominican Republic) Sauryn Lao (LE)	
Week 4	(Dominican Republic) Félix Reyes (TE)	(Dominican Republic) Sauryn Lao (LE)	
Week 5			
Week 6			
Week 7			
Week 8			
Week 9			
Week 10			

=== Awards & Honors ===
As of 21 September 2026

Award	Name	Source
Rookie of the Year		
Caballero of the Year		
General Manager of the Year		
Manager of the Year		
Pitcher of the Year		
Most Valuable Player		
