= 2025–26 LIDOM season =

2025–26 Dominican Professional Baseball League season
- League: LIDOM
- Sport: Baseball
- Duration: 15 October 2025 – 28 January 2026
- Games: 50 games (Serie Regular); 18 games (Serie Semifinal); Best-of-seven (Serie Final)
- Teams: 6
- Streaming partner: MLB.tv (United States)

Serie Regular
- Season champions: Águilas Cibaeñas
- Season MVP: Bryan De La Cruz (Toros del Este)

Serie Final
- Champions: Leones del Escogido (18th title)
- Runners-up: Toros del Este
- Finals MVP: Alcides Escobar (Leones del Escogido)

Seasons
- ← 2024–25 2026–27 →

The 2025–26 Dominican Professional Baseball League season is the 58th consecutive season of winter league baseball in the Dominican Republic, and 71st overall season. The regular season started on 15 October 2025, and ended on 23 December 2025. BanReservas is the main sponsor for the 2025–26 season. The season is also being played in dedication to hall of famer Juan Marichal for his baseball trajectory and contribution to baseball both nationally and internationally.

Leones del Escogido successfully defended their crown by winning their 18th championship, defeating the Toros del Este 4-1 in the Serie Final.

== Competition format ==
Each team plays a 50-game regular season schedule (Serie Regular). The top four teams in the standings then play an 18-game round-robin playoff format (Serie Semifinal), to determine the top two teams that will play the Serie Final. The Serie Final is set to be a best-of-seven series to determined the season champion who will represent the Dominican Republic at the 2026 Caribbean Series.

== Season review ==
The Águilas Cibaeñas and Gigantes del Cibao were scheduled to play the Copa del Cibao Serie New York 2025 in a three-game series on November 7–9 at Citi Field in New York. On 6 November 2025, the Águilas Cibaeñas announced the Copa del Cibao Serie would be played at Estadio Cibao in Santiago.

=== All-Star Game ===
LIDOM and Liga de Béisbol Profesional Roberto Clemente (LBPRC) from Puerto Rico scheduled an all-star game in New York on the 15 November 2025, billed as the RD vs PR Showdown NYC. The LIDOM All-Stars won the game by a score of 6–2 over the LBPRC All-Stars in front of a crowd of 20,057 at Citi Field.

15 November 2025 13:45 at Citi Field in Flushing Meadows–Corona Park, New York 47 °F (8 °C), Partly Cloudy
Team	1	2	3	4	5	6	7	8	9	R	H	E
(Dominican Republic) LIDOM All-Stars	0	0	0	0	0	3	0	2	1	6	11	2
(Puerto Rico) LBPRC All-Stars	0	0	0	0	0	0	2	0	0	2	6	0
WP: Huascar Ynoa (1–0) LP: Yacksel Ríos (0–1); Home runs: DOM: Emmanuel Rodríguez (1); PUR: None; Attendance: 20,057; Boxscore

== Teams ==
LIDOM teams locations.

=== Team Locations ===
Cap Insignia	Team	City	Stadium	Capacity	Founded	Manager	League Titles
	Águilas Cibaeñas	Santiago de los Caballeros	Estadio Cibao	18,077	1933	(Colombia) Luis Urueta	22
	Estrellas Orientales	San Pedro de Macorís	Estadio Tetelo Vargas	8,000	1910	(Dominican Republic) Carlos Paulino (Interim)	3
	Gigantes del Cibao	San Francisco de Macorís	Estadio Julián Javier	12,000	1996	(Dominican Republic) Jefry Sierra (Interim)	2
	Leones del Escogido	Santo Domingo	Estadio Quisqueya	13,186	1921	(Dominican Republic) Ramón Santiago (Interim)	17
	Tigres del Licey	Santo Domingo	Estadio Quisqueya	13,186	1907	(Dominican Republic) Gilbert Gómez	24
	Toros del Este	La Romana	Estadio Francisco Micheli	8,838	1983	(Dominican Republic) Víctor Estévez	3

=== Managerial changes ===
Date	Team	Former Manager	Reason	New Manager	Source
29 November 2025	Estrellas Orientales	(Dominican Republic) Fernando Tatís	Fired	(Dominican Republic) Carlos Paulino (Interim)	
1 December 2025	Leones del Escogido	(Puerto Rico) Alex Cintrón	Fired	(Dominican Republic) Ramón Santiago (Interim)	
30 December 2025	Gigantes del Cibao	(Dominican Republic) José Leger	Fired	(Dominican Republic) Jefry Sierra (Interim)	

== Serie Regular ==
Each team plays 50 games in the regular season. A team's schedule is organized into 10 games versus each opponent, respectively, with 5 games at home and 5 games away against the same opponent from 15 October 2025, to 23 December 2025.

Games scheduled to be played from 21 October 2025 to 26 October 2025 were postponed due to heavy rain and flooding as a result of Hurricane Melissa.

=== Standings ===
As of 20 January 2026

Team	GP	W	L	PCT.	GB	Home	Road	STK	RS	RA	DIFF.	Qualification
Águilas Cibaeñas	49 (Note: Game 49 between the Águilas and Toros was scheduled for 22 December 2025, but was postponed due to rain. It was not replayed as it did not affect final standings.)	32	17	.653	–	17-8	15–9	L1	256	222	+34	Qualification to Serie Semifinal
Toros del Este	49	27	22	.551	5	14-10	13–12	W2	262	247	+15	Qualification to Serie Semifinal
Gigantes del Cibao	50	24	26	.480	8.5	15-10	9–16	W4	230	238	-8	Qualification to Serie Semifinal
Leones del Escogido	50	23	27	.460	9.5	13-12	10–15	W1	248	232	+16	Qualification to Serie Semifinal
Estrellas Orientales	50	22	28	.440	10.5	12-13	10–15	L3	234	256	-22	
Tigres del Licey	50	21	29	.420	11.5	12-13	9–16	L3	185	220	-35	

=== Head to head ===
2025-26 Serie Regular record vs. opponents Source: LIDOM Standings Grid – 2025-26
Team	AC	EO	GC	LE	TL	TE
Águilas Cibaeñas	—	9-1	7-3	5-5	6-4	5-4
Estrellas Orientales	1-9	—	5-5	5-5	7-3	4-6
Gigantes del Cibao	3-7	5-5	—	4-6	4-6	8-2
Leones del Escogido	5-5	5-5	6-4	—	5-5	2-8
Tigres del Licey	4-6	3-7	6-4	5-5	—	3-7
Toros del Este	4-5	6-4	2-8	8-2	7-3	—

=== Schedule ===
Time zone: UTC−04:00

Week 1 – 15 to 19 October 2025
Date	Time	Road team	Result	Home team	Stadium
15 October 2025	7:30 p.m.	Leones del Escogido	3–4 (10)	Tigres del Licey	Estadio Quisqueya
15 October 2025	7:30 p.m.	Gigantes del Cibao	3–4	Águilas Cibaeñas	Estadio Cibao
15 October 2025	7:30 p.m.	Toros del Este	3–7	Estrellas Orientales	Estadio Tetelo Vargas
16 October 2025	7:00 p.m.	Tigres del Licey	Postponed	Gigantes del Cibao	Estadio Julian Javier
16 October 2025	7:15 p.m.	Estrellas Orientales	Postponed	Leones del Escogido	Estadio Quisqueya
16 October 2025	7:30 p.m.	Águilas Cibaeñas	11–4	Toros del Este	Estadio Francisco Micheli
17 October 2025	7:30 p.m	Gigantes del Cibao	Postponed	Tigres del Licey	Estadio Quisqueya
17 October 2025	7:30 p.m	Toros del Este	14–7	Águilas Cibaeñas	Estadio Cibao
17 October 2025	7:30 p.m	Leones del Escogido	7–8	Estrellas Orientales	Estadio Tetelo Vargas
18 October 2025	4:00 p.m.	Tigres del Licey	8–2	Leones del Escogido	Estadio Quisqueya
18 October 2025	5:00 p.m.	Águilas Cibaeñas	Postponed	Gigantes del Cibao	Estadio Julian Javier
18 October 2025	7:30 p.m.	Estrellas Orientales	7–3	Toros del Este	Estadio Francisco Micheli
19 October 2025	4:00 p.m.	Toros del Este	4–3	Leones del Escogido	Estadio Quisqueya
19 October 2025	4:00 p.m.	Tigres del Licey	0–4	Águilas Cibaeñas	Estadio Cibao
19 October 2025	5:00 p.m.	Gigantes del Cibao	4–9	Estrellas Orientales	Estadio Tetelo Vargas

Week 2 – 20 to 26 October 2025
Date	Time	Road team	Result	Home team	Stadium
20 October 2025	7:00 p.m.	Tigres del Licey	7–4	Gigantes del Cibao	Estadio Julian Javier
20 October 2025	10:00 p.m.	Estrellas Orientales	0–2	Leones del Escogido	Estadio Quisqueya
21 October 2025	7:00 p.m.	Leones del Escogido	Postponed	Gigantes del Cibao	Estadio Julian Javier
21 October 2025	7:30 p.m.	Águilas Cibaeñas	Postponed	Estrellas Orientales	Estadio Tetelo Vargas
21 October 2025	7:30 p.m.	Toros del Este	Postponed	Tigres del Licey	Estadio Quisqueya
22 October 2025	7:15 p.m.	Gigantes del Cibao	Postponed	Leones del Escogido	Estadio Quisqueya
22 October 2025	7:30 p.m.	Estrellas Orientales	Postponed	Águilas Cibaeñas	Estadio Cibao
22 October 2025	7:30 p.m.	Tigres del Licey	Postponed	Toros del Este	Estadio Francisco Micheli
23 October 2025	7:30 p.m.	Gigantes del Cibao	Postponed	Tigres del Licey	Estadio Quisqueya
23 October 2025	7:30 p.m.	Águilas Cibaeñas	Postponed	Estrellas Orientales	Estadio Tetelo Vargas
24 October 2025	7:00 p.m.	Toros del Este	Postponed	Gigantes del Cibao	Estadio Julian Javier
24 October 2025	7:15 p.m.	Águilas Cibaeñas	Postponed	Leones del Escogido	Estadio Quisqueya
24 October 2025	7:30 p.m.	Tigres del Licey	Postponed	Estrellas Orientales	Estadio Tetelo Vargas
25 October 2025	5:00 p.m.	Estrellas Orientales	Postponed	Tigres del Licey	Estadio Quisqueya
25 October 2025	6:00 p.m.	Leones del Escogido	Postponed	Águilas Cibaeñas	Estadio Cibao
25 October 2025	7:30 p.m.	Gigantes del Cibao	Postponed	Toros del Este	Estadio Francisco Micheli
26 October 2025	5:00 p.m.	Águilas Cibaeñas	Postponed	Tigres del Licey	Estadio Quisqueya
26 October 2025	5:00 p.m.	Estrellas Orientales	Postponed	Gigantes del Cibao	Estadio Julian Javier
26 October 2025	5:00 p.m.	Leones del Escogido	Postponed	Toros del Este	Estadio Francisco Micheli

Week 3 – 27 October to 2 November 2025
Date	Time	Road team	Result	Home team	Stadium
27 October 2025	7:00 p.m.	Leones del Escogido	10–2	Gigantes del Cibao	Estadio Julian Javier
27 October 2025	7:30 p.m.	Águilas Cibaeñas	6–5	Estrellas Orientales	Estadio Tetelo Vargas
27 October 2025	7:30 p.m.	Toros del Este	Postponed	Tigres del Licey	Estadio Quisqueya
28 October 2025	7:15 p.m.	Gigantes del Cibao	5–7	Leones del Escogido	Estadio Quisqueya
28 October 2025	7:30 p.m.	Estrellas Orientales	10–15	Águilas Cibaeñas	Estadio Cibao
28 October 2025	7:30 p.m.	Tigres del Licey	8–2	Toros del Este	Estadio Francisco Micheli
29 October 2025	7:00 p.m.	Leones del Escogido	Suspended (4)	Gigantes del Cibao	Estadio Julain Javier
29 October 2025	7:30 p.m.	Águilas Cibaeñas	9–8 (10)	Estrellas Orientales	Estadio Tetelo Vargas
29 October 2025	7:30 p.m.	Toros del Este	6–3	Tigres del Licey	Estadio Quisqueya
30 October 2025	7:30 p.m.	Gigantes del Cibao	Postponed	Tigres del Licey	Estadio Quisqueya
31 October 2025	7:00 p.m.	Estrellas Orientales	1–3	Gigantes del Cibao	Estadio Julian Javier
31 October 2025	7:30 p.m.	Águilas Cibaeñas	3–0	Tigres del Licey	Estadio Quisqueya
31 October 2025	7:30 p.m.	Leones del Escogido	2–3	Toros del Este	Estadio Francisco Micheli
1 November 2025	4:00 p.m.	Toros del Este	3–12	Leones del Escogido	Estadio Quisqueya
1 November 2025	6:00 p.m.	Tigres del Licey	1–4	Águilas Cibaeñas	Estadio Cibao
1 November 2025	7:30 p.m.	Gigantes del Cibao	8–7	Estrellas Orientales	Estadio Tetelo Vargas
2 November 2025	5:00 p.m.	Leones del Escogido	10–5	Tigres del Licey	Estadio Quisqueya
2 November 2025	5:00 p.m.	Toros del Este	7–2	Estrellas Orientales	Estadio Tetelo Vargas
2 November 2025	5:00 p.m.	Águilas Cibaeñas	Postponed	Gigantes del Cibao	Estadio Julian Javier

Week 4 – 3 to 9 November 2025
Date	Time	Road team	Result	Home team	Stadium
3 November 2025	7:30 p.m.	Estrellas Orientales	6–8	Gigantes del Cibao	Estadio Julian Javier
4 November 2025	7:30 p.m.	Estrellas Orientales	11–6	Tigres del Licey	Estadio Quisqueya
4 November 2025	7:30 p.m.	Gigantes del Cibao	7–4	Toros del Este	Estadio Francisco Micheli
4 November 2025	7:30 p.m.	Leones del Escogido	Postponed	Águilas Cibaeñas	Estadio Cibao
5 November 2025	7:00 p.m.	Águilas Cibaeñas	5–2	Gigantes del Cibao	Estadio Julian Javier
5 November 2025	7:15 p.m.	Tigres del Licey	1–5	Leones del Escogido	Estadio Quisqueya
5 November 2025	7:30 p.m.	Toros del Este	4–7	Estrellas Orientales	Estadio Tetelo Vargas
6 November 2025	7:30 p.m.	Águilas Cibaeñas	1–7	Tigres del Licey	Estadio Quisqueya
7 November 2025	7:30 p.m.	Gigantes del Cibao	2–6	Águilas Cibaeñas	Estadio Cibao
7 November 2025	7:30 p.m.	Leones del Escogido	3–5	Estrellas Orientales	Estadio Tetelo Vargas
7 November 2025	7:30 p.m.	Toros del Este	9–0	Tigres del Licey	Estadio Quisqueya
8 November 2025	5:00 p.m.	Águilas Cibaeñas	4–7	Gigantes del Cibao	Estadio Julian Javier
8 November 2025	5:00 p.m.	Estrellas Orientales	2–5	Tigres del Licey	Estadio Quisqueya
8 November 2025	7:30 p.m.	Leones del Escogido	2–3	Toros del Este	Estadio Francisco Micheli
9 November 2025	4:00 p.m.	Gigantes del Cibao	3–7	Águilas Cibaeñas	Estadio Cibao
9 November 2025	4:00 p.m.	Tigres del Licey	4–2	Leones del Escogido	Estadio Quisqueya
9 November 2025	5:00 p.m.	Estrellas Orientales	4–10	Toros del Este	Estadio Francisco Micheli

Week 5 – 10 to 16 November 2025
Date	Time	Road team	Result	Home team	Stadium
10 November 2025	4:00 p.m.	Toros del Este	12–4	Leones del Escogido	Estadio Quisqueya
10 November 2025	5:00 p.m.	Tigres del Licey	0–4	Estrellas Orientales	Estadio Tetelo Vargas
11 November 2025	7:30 p.m.	Estrellas Orientales	9–5	Toros del Este	Estadio Francisco Micheli
11 November 2025	7:30 p.m.	Gigantes del Cibao	1–6	Águilas Cibaeñas	Estadio Cibao
11 November 2025	7:30 p.m.	Leones del Escogido	5–0	Tigres del Licey	Estadio Quisqueya
12 November 2025	4:00 p.m.	Leones del Escogido	1–2	Gigantes del Cibao	Estadio Julian Javier
12 November 2025	7:00 p.m.	Leones del Escogido	5–3	Gigantes del Cibao	Estadio Julian Javier
12 November 2025	7:30 p.m.	Águilas Cibaeñas	5–3	Estrellas Orientales	Estadio Tetelo Vargas
13 November 2025	7:30 p.m.	Estrellas Orientales	2–6	Tigres del Licey	Estadio Quisqueya
13 November 2025	7:30 p.m.	Gigantes del Cibao	3–2	Toros del Este	Estadio Francisco Micheli
13 November 2025	7:30 p.m.	Leones del Escogido	6–7	Águilas Cibaeñas	Estadio Cibao

Week 6 – 17 to 23 November 2025
Date	Time	Road team	Result	Home team	Stadium
17 November 2025	7:00 p.m.	Estrellas Orientales	6–1	Gigantes del Cibao	Estadio Julian Javier
17 November 2025	7:30 p.m.	Águilas Cibaeñas	6–4 (10)	Tigres del Licey	Estadio Quisqueya
17 November 2025	7:30 p.m.	Leones del Escogido	4–8	Toros del Este	Estadio Francisco Micheli
18 November 2025	7:30 p.m.	Gigantes del Cibao	2–3	Tigres del Licey	Estadio Quisqueya
18 November 2025	7:30 p.m.	Leones del Escogido	3–1	Estrellas Orientales	Estadio Tetelo Vargas
18 November 2025	7:30 p.m.	Toros del Este	6–13	Águilas Cibaeñas	Estadio Cibao
19 November 2025	7:00 p.m.	Estrellas Orientales	2–5	Gigantes del Cibao	Estadio Julian Javier
19 November 2025	7:15 p.m.	Tigres del Licey	4–5	Leones del Escogido	Estadio Quisqueya
19 November 2025	7:30 p.m.	Águilas Cibaeñas	3–1	Toros del Este	Estadio Francisco Micheli
21 November 2025	4:00 p.m.	Estrellas Orientales	7–8	Águilas Cibaeñas	Estadio Cibao
21 November 2025	4:00 p.m.	Gigantes del Cibao	1–4	Leones del Escogido	Estadio Quisqueya
21 November 2025	4:00 p.m.	Tigres del Licey	6–7 (10)	Toros el Este	Estadio Francisco Micheli
21 November 2025	7:15 p.m.	Gigantes del Cibao	10–2	Leones del Escogido	Estadio Quisqueya
21 November 2025	7:30 p.m.	Estrellas Orientales	4–5	Águilas Cibaeñas	Estadio Cibao
21 November 2025	7:30 p.m.	Tigres del Licey	2–4	Toros del Este	Estadio Francisco Micheli
22 November 2025	5:00 p.m.	Águilas Cibaeñas	0–2	Gigantes del Cibao	Estadio Julian Javier
22 November 2025	7:00 p.m.	Estrellas Orientales	7–3	Tigres del Licey	Estadio Quisqueya
22 November 2025	7:30 p.m.	Leones del Escogido	4–5	Toros del Este	Estadio Francisco Micheli
23 November 2025	4:00 p.m.	Águilas Cibaeñas	4–1	Leones del Escogido	Estadio Quisqueya
23 November 2025	5:00 p.m.	Tigres del Licey	4–5 (10)	Estrellas Orientales	Estadio Tetelo Vargas
23 November 2025	5:00 p.m.	Toros del Este	6–14	Gigantes del Cibao	Estadio Julian Javier

Week 7 – 24 to 30 November 2025
Date	Time	Road team	Result	Home team	Stadium
24 November 2025	7:00 p.m.	Águilas Cibaeñas	6–1	Gigantes del Cibao	Estadio Julian Javier
24 November 2025	7:30 p.m.	Toros del Este	3–6	Tigres del Licey	Estadio Quisqueya
25 November 2025	7:15 p.m.	Toros del Este	4–1	Leones del Escogido	Estadio Quisqueya
25 November 2025	7:30 p.m.	Gigantes del Cibao	2–4	Estrellas Orientales	Estadio Tetelo Vargas
25 November 2025	7:30 p.m.	Tigres del Licey	8–7	Águilas Cibaeñas	Estadio Cibao
26 November 2025	7:00 p.m.	Tigres del Licey	2–0	Gigantes del Cibao	Estadio Julian Javier
26 November 2025	7:15 p.m.	Estrellas Orientales	3–6	Leones del Escogido	Estadio Quisqueya
26 November 2025	7:30 p.m.	Águilas Cibaeñas	6–4	Toros del Este	Estadio Francisco Micheli
28 November 2025	7:00 p.m.	Toros del Este	4–12	Gigantes del Cibao	Estadio Julian Javier
28 November 2025	7:30 p.m.	Águilas Cibaeñas	5–10	Tigres del Licey	Estadio Quisqueya
28 November 2025	7:30 p.m.	Leones del Escogido	6–4	Estrellas Orientales	Estadio Tetelo Vargas
29 November 2025	4:00 p.m.	Estrellas Orientales	8–1	Leones del Escogido	Estadio Quisqueya
29 November 2025	6:00 p.m.	Tigres del Licey	1–4	Águilas Cibaeñas	Estadio Cibao
29 November 2025	7:30 p.m.	Gigantes del Cibao	4–5	Toros del Este	Estadio Francisco Micheli
30 November 2025	4:00 p.m.	Estrellas Orientales	6–5	Leones del Escogido	Estadio Quisqueya
30 November 2025	5:00 p.m.	Águilas Cibaeñas	3–10	Toros del Este	Estadio Francisco Micheli
30 November 2025	5:00 p.m.	Tigres del Licey	3–4	Gigantes del Cibao	Estadio Julian Javier

Week 8 – 1 to 7 December 2025
Date	Time	Road team	Result	Home team	Stadium
2 December 2025	7:30 p.m.	Gigantes del Cibao	4–5	Tigres del Licey	Estadio Quisqueya
2 December 2025	7:30 p.m.	Leones del Escogido	6–0	Águilas Cibaeñas	Estadio Cibao
2 December 2025	7:30 p.m.	Toros del Este	6–1	Estrellas Orientales	Estadio Tetelo Vargas
3 December 2025	7:00 p.m.	Estrellas Orientales	7–5	Gigantes del Cibao	Estadio Julian Javier
3 December 2025	7:30 p.m.	Águilas Cibaeñas	4–2	Tigres del Licey	Estadio Quisqueya
3 December 2025	7:30 p.m.	Leones del Escogido	4–7	Toros del Este	Estadio Francisco Micheli
4 December 2025	7:30 p.m.	Gigantes del Cibao	7–5	Toros del Este	Estadio Francisco Micheli
4 December 2025	7:30 p.m.	Leones del Escogido	1–4	Águilas Cibaeñas	Estadio Cibao
5 December 2025	7:00 p.m.	Águilas Cibaeñas	3–7	Gigantes del Cibao	Estadio Javier Julian
5 December 2025	7:15 p.m.	Tigres del Licey	5–3	Leones del Escogido	Estadio Quisqueya
5 December 2025	7:30 p.m.	Toros del Este	7–0	Estrellas Orientales	Estadio Tetelo Vargas
6 December 2025	4:00 p.m.	Águilas Cibaeñas	8–9	Leones del Escogido	Estadio Quisqueya
6 December 2025	5:00 p.m.	Tigres del Licey	2–4	Gigantes del Cibao	Estadio Julian Javier
6 December 2025	7:30 p.m.	Estrellas Orientales	1–9	Toros del Este	Estadio Francisco Micheli
7 December 2025	4:00 p.m.	Toros del Este	0–2	Águilas Cibaeñas	Estadio Cibao
7 December 2025	5:00 p.m.	Gigantes del Cibao	8–7 (10)	Estrellas Orientales	Estadio Tetelo Vargas
7 December 2025	5:00 p.m.	Leones del Escogido	5–6 (10)	Tigres del Licey	Estadio Quisqueya

Week 9 – 8 to 14 December 2025
Date	Time	Road team	Result	Home team	Stadium
9 December 2025	7:30 p.m.	Estrellas Orientales	3–4 (10)	Toros del Este	Estadio Francisco Micheli
9 December 2025	7:30 p.m.	Gigantes del Cibao	6–8	Águilas Cibaeñas	Estadio Cibao
9 December 2025	7:30 p.m.	Leones del Escogido	15–1	Tigres del Licey	Estadio Quisqueya
10 December 2025	7:30 p.m.	Gigantes del Cibao	1–6	Tigres del Licey	Estadio Quisqueya
10 December 2025	7:30 p.m.	Leones del Escogido	4–6 (10)	Estrellas Orientales	Estadio Tetelo Vargas
10 December 2025	7:30 p.m.	Toros del Este	12–5	Águilas Cibaeñas	Estadio Cibao
11 December 2025	7:30 p.m.	Gigantes del Cibao	0–1	Tigres del Licey	Estadio Quisqueya
11 December 2025	7:30 p.m.	Leones del Escogido	0–5	Águilas Cibaeñas	Estadio Cibao
12 December 2025	7:00 p.m.	Toros del Este	10–3	Gigantes del Cibao	Estadio Julian Javier
12 December 2025	7:15 p.m.	Águilas Cibaeñas	3–7	Leones del Escogido	Estadio Quisqueya
12 December 2025	7:30 p.m.	Tigres del Licey	4–1	Estrellas Orientales	Estadio Tetelo Vargas
13 December 2025	4:00 p.m.	Gigantes del Cibao	3–6	Leones del Escogido	Estadio Quisqueya
13 December 2025	6:00 p.m.	Estrellas Orientales	3–2	Águilas Cibaeñas	Estadio Cibao
13 December 2025	7:30 p.m.	Tigres del Licey	Postponed	Toros del Este	Estadio Francisco Micheli
14 December 2025	5:00 p.m.	Águilas Cibaeñas	8–2	Estrellas Orientales	Estadio Tetelo Vargas
14 December 2025	5:00 p.m.	Leones del Escogido	11–8	Gigantes del Cibao	Estadio Julian Javier
14 December 2025	5:00 p.m.	Toros del Este	3–2	Tigres del Licey	Estadio Quisqueya

Week 10 – 15 to 23 December 2025
Date	Time	Road team	Result	Home team	Stadium
15 December 2025	5:00 p.m.	Tigres del Licey	1–2	Toros del Este	Estadio Francisco Micheli
16 December 2025	4:00 p.m.	Águilas Cibaeñas	5–2	Leones del Escogido	Estadio Quisqueya
16 December 2025	4:00 p.m.	Tigres del Licey	2–4	Estrellas Orientales	Estadio Tetelo Vargas
16 December 2025	4:00 p.m.	Toros del Este	1–8	Gigantes del Cibao	Estadio Julian Javier
16 December 2025	7:00 p.m.	Toros del Este	8–11	Gigantes del Cibao	Estadio Julian Javier
16 December 2025	7:15 p.m.	Águilas Cibaeñas	5–8	Leones del Escogido	Estadio Quisqueya
16 December 2025	7:30 p.m.	Tigres del Licey	3–4 (10)	Estrellas Orientales	Estadio Tetelo Vargas
17 December 2025	7:30 p.m.	Estrellas Orientales	10–2	Tigres del Licey	Estadio Quisqueya
17 December 2025	7:30 p.m.	Gigantes del Cibao	2–1	Toros del Este	Estadio Francisco Micheli
17 December 2025	7:30 p.m.	Leones del Escogido	8–5	Águilas Cibaeñas	Estadio Cibao
19 December 2025	6:15 p.m.	Toros del Este	4–5 (10)	Leones del Escogido	Estadio Quisqueya
19 December 2025	7:30 p.m.	Gigantes del Cibao	3–4 (12)	Estrellas Orientales	Estadio Tetelo Vargas
19 December 2025	7:30 p.m.	Tigres del Licey	4–2	Águilas Cibaeñas	Estadio Cibao
20 December 2025	5:00 p.m.	Leones del Escogido	1–4	Gigantes del Cibao	Estadio Julian Javier
20 December 2025	5:00 p.m.	Toros del Este	3–7	Tigres del Licey	Estadio Quisqueya
20 December 2025	7:30 p.m.	Águilas Cibaeñas	4–3	Estrellas Orientales	Estadio Tetelo Vargas
21 December 2025	4:00 p.m.	Estrellas Orientales	1–6	Águilas Cibaeñas	Estadio Cibao
21 December 2025	4:00 p.m.	Gigantes del Cibao	13–9	Leones del Escogido	Estadio Quisqueya
21 December 2025	5:00 p.m.	Tigres del Licey	6–9	Toros del Este	Estadio Francisco Micheli
22 December 2025	7:00 p.m.	Tigres del Licey	3–5	Gigantes del Cibao	Estadio Julian Javier
22 December 2025	7:15 p.m.	Estrellas Orientales	3–11	Leones del Escogido	Estadio Quisqueya
22 December 2025	7:30 p.m.	Águilas Cibaeñas	Cancelled	Toros del Este	Estadio Francisco Micheli
23 December 2025	7:30 p.m.	Gigantes del Cibao	3–2 (10)	Tigres del Licey	Estadio Quisqueya
23 December 2025	7:30 p.m.	Toros del Este	6–3	Águilas Cibaeñas	Estadio Cibao

=== Statistics ===
As of 5 January 2026

Hitting leaders
Stat	Player	Total
AVG	(Nicaragua) Ismael Munguia (EO)	.368
HR	(Dominican Republic) Miguel Sanó (EO)	9
RBI	(Dominican Republic) Bryan De La Cruz (TE)	40
R	(Dominican Republic) Gilberto Celestino (TE)	37
H	(Dominican Republic) Raimel Tapia (EO)	73
SB	(Dominican Republic) Gilberto Celestino (TE)	22

Pitching leaders
Stat	Player	Total
W	(United States) Aaron Sanchez (TE) (United States) Grant Gavin (LE)	4
L	(Dominican Republic) Albert Abreu (TL)	5
ERA	(United States) Aaron Sanchez (TE)	1.55
K	(Dominican Republic) Oscar De La Cruz (EO)	54
IP	(Dominican Republic) Enny Romero (EO)	50.1
SV	(Dominican Republic) Jean Carlos Mejia (TL)	7

=== Weekly Awards ===
As of 5 January 2026

Players of the Week
Week	Position	Pitcher	Source
Week 1	(Dominican Republic) Miguel Sanó (EO)	(United States) Aaron Sánchez (TE)	
Week 2	Not awarded due to Hurricane Melissa		
Week 3	(Dominican Republic) Miguel Sanó (EO)	(United States) Aaron Sánchez (TE)	
Week 4	(United States) Jake Holton (GC)	(United States) Aaron Sánchez (TE)	
Week 5	(Dominican Republic) Gilberto Celestino (TE)	(United States) Grant Gavin (LE)	
Week 6	(Dominican Republic) Raimel Tapia (EO)	(Panama) Abdiel Mendoza (AC)	
Week 7	(Dominican Republic) Bryan De La Cruz (TE)	(Dominican Republic) Jorge Tavarez (AC)	
Week 8	(United States) Jeimer Candelario (TE)	(United States) Travis Lakins (LE)	
Week 9	(Dominican Republic) Alexander Canario (LE)	(United States) Aaron Brooks (TE)	
Week 10	(Nicaragua) Ismael Munguia (EO)	(United States) Justin Courtney (TE)	

=== Awards & Honors ===
As of 5 January 2026

Award	Name	Source
Rookie of the Year	(Dominican Republic) Alberto Rodriguez (AC)	
Caballero of the Year	(Dominican Republic) Erik González (LE)	
General Manager of the Year	(Dominican Republic) Gian Guzmán (AC)	
Manager of the Year	(Colombia) Luis Urueta (AC)	
Pitcher of the Year	(United States) Aaron Sánchez (TE)	
Most Valuable Player	(Dominican Republic) Bryan De La Cruz (TE)	

== Serie Semifinal ==
Each team plays an 18-game round-robin schedule. A team's schedule is organized into 6 games versus each opponent with 3 games at home and 3 games away against the same opponent from 27 December 2025, to 17 January 2026.

=== Standings ===
As of 20 January 2026

Team	GP	W	L	PCT.	GB	Home	Road	STK	RS	RA	DIFF.	Qualification
Leones del Escogido	18	12	6	.667	–	6–3	6–3	L1	91	60	+31	Qualification to Serie Final
Toros del Este	18	12	6	.667	–	6–3	6–3	W5	104	75	+29	Qualification to Serie Final
Águilas Cibaeñas	18	10	8	.556	2	4–5	6–3	L1	81	100	-19	
Gigantes del Cibao	18	2	16	.111	10	1–8	1–8	L6	64	105	-41	

=== Head to head ===
2025-26 Serie Semifinal record vs. opponents Source: LIDOM Standings Grid – 2025—26
Team	AC	GC	LE	TE
Águilas Cibaeñas	—	6-0	3-3	1-5
Gigantes del Cibao	0-6	—	0-6	2-4
Leones del Escogido	3-3	6-0	—	3-3
Toros del Este	5-1	4-2	3-3	—

=== Schedule ===
Time zone: UTC−04:00

Week 1 – 27 December 2025 to 4 January 2026
Date	Time	Road team	Result	Home team	Stadium
27 December 2025	5:00 p.m.	Leones del Escogido	12–2	Águilas Cibaeñas	Estadio Cibao
27 December 2025	7:30 p.m.	Gigantes del Cibao	3–11	Toros del Este	Estadio Francisco Micheli
28 December 2025	4:00 p.m.	Toros del Este	7–8 (11)	Leones del Escogido	Estadio Quisqueya
28 December 2025	5:00 p.m.	Águilas Cibaeñas	10–6 (10)	Gigantes del Cibao	Estadio Julian Javier
29 December 2025	7:00 p.m.	Leones del Escogido	4–2	Gigantes del Cibao	Estadio Julian Javier
29 December 2025	7:30 p.m.	Toros del Este	7–6	Águilas Cibaeñas	Estadio Cibao
30 December 2025	7:15 p.m.	Gigantes del Cibao	2–3	Leones del Escogido	Estadio Quisqueya
30 December 2025	7:30 p.m.	Águilas Cibaeñas	5–8	Toros del Este	Estadio Francisco Micheli
2 January 2026	7:30 p.m.	Gigantes del Cibao	7–8 (10)	Águilas Cibaeñas	Estadio Cibao
2 January 2026	7:30 p.m.	Leones del Escogido	10–5	Toros del Este	Estadio Francisco Micheli
3 January 2026	4:00 p.m.	Águilas Cibaeñas	4–1	Leones del Escogido	Estadio Quisqueya
3 January 2026	5:00 p.m.	Toros del Este	3–1	Gigantes del Cibao	Estadio Julian Javier
4 January 2026	4:00 p.m.	Leones del Escogido	5–2	Águilas Cibaeñas	Estadio Cibao
4 January 2026	5:00 p.m.	Gigantes del Cibao	6–10	Toros del Este	Estadio Francisco Micheli

Week 2 – 5 January to 11 January 2026
Date	Time	Road team	Result	Home team	Stadium
5 January 2026	4:00 p.m.	Toros del Este	3–1	Leones del Escogido	Estadio Quisqueya
5 January 2026	7:00 p.m.	Águilas Cibaeñas	Postponed	Gigantes del Cibao	Estadio Julian Javier
6 January 2026	7:00 p.m.	Águilas Cibaeñas	6–5	Gigantes del Cibao	Estadio Julian Javier
7 January 2026	7:00 p.m.	Leones del Escogido	5–0	Gigantes del Cibao	Estadio Julian Javier
7 January 2026	7:30 p.m.	Toros del Este	17–1	Águilas Cibaeñas	Estadio Cibao
8 January 2026	7:30 p.m.	Gigantes del Cibao	4–1	Toros del Este	Estadio Francisco Micheli
8 January 2026	7:30 p.m.	Leones del Escogido	1–2	Águilas Cibaeñas	Estadio Cibao
9 January 2026	7:15 p.m.	Gigantes del Cibao	6–7 (10)	Leones del Escogido	Estadio Quisqueya
9 January 2026	7:30 p.m.	Águilas Cibaeñas	3–1	Toros del Este	Estadio Francisco Micheli
10 January 2026	4:00 p.m.	Águilas Cibaeñas	3–8	Leones del Escogido	Estadio Quisqueya
10 January 2026	5:00 p.m.	Toros del Este	1–2 (10)	Gigantes del Cibao	Estadio Julian Javier
11 January 2026	4:00 p.m.	Toros del Este	2–7	Leones del Escogido	Estadio Quisqueya
11 January 2026	5:00 p.m.	Águilas Cibaeñas	9–3	Gigantes del Cibao	Estadio Julian Javier

Week 3 – 12 January to 17 January 2026
Date	Time	Road team	Result	Home team	Stadium
13 January 2026	7:30 p.m.	Gigantes del Cibao	3–4 (11)	Águilas Cibaeñas	Estadio Cibao
13 January 2026	7:30 p.m.	Leones del Escogido	1–3	Toros del Este	Estadio Francisco Micheli
14 January 2026	7:00 p.m.	Leones del Escogido	5–1	Gigantes del Cibao	Estadio Julian Javier
14 January 2026	7:30 p.m.	Toros del Este	3–0	Águilas Cibaeñas	Estadio Cibao
15 January 2026	7:30 p.m.	Gigantes del Cibao	4–5	Águilas Cibaeñas	Estadio Cibao
15 January 2026	7:30 p.m.	Leones del Escogido	5–8	Toros del Este	Estadio Francisco Micheli
16 January 2026	7:15 p.m.	Gigantes del Cibao	4–7	Leones del Escogido	Estadio Quisqueya
16 January 2026	7:30 p.m.	Águilas Cibaeñas	Annulled	Toros del Este	Estadio Francisco Micheli
17 January 2026	4:00 p.m.	Águilas Cibaeñas	Postponed	Leones del Escogido	Estadio Quisqueya
17 January 2026	5:00 p.m.	Toros del Este	6–5	Gigantes del Cibao	Estadio Julian Javier
18 January 2026	4:00 p.m.	Águilas Cibaeñas	4-1	Leones del Escogido	Estadio Quisqueya
19 January 2026	7:30 p.m.	Águilas Cibaeñas	7–8 (10)	Toros del Este	Estadio Francisco Micheli

=== Statistics ===
As of 19 January 2026

Hitting leaders
Stat	Player	Total
AVG	(Dominican Republic) Cristhian Adames (AC)	.377
HR	(Dominican Republic) Leody Taveras (AC) (Dominican Republic) Jose Siri (GC)	3
RBI	(Dominican Republic) Eloy Jiménez (TE)	16
R	(Dominican Republic) Raimel Tapia (LE) (Dominican Republic) Junior Lake (LE)	13
H	(Dominican Republic) Cristhian Adames (AC)	26
SB	(Dominican Republic) Leody Taveras (AC) (Dominican Republic) Jorge Mateo (LE)	9

Pitching leaders
Stat	Player	Total
W	(Cuba) Yoan Lopez (AC)	3
L	(Dominican Republic) Cristopher Molina (GC)	3
ERA	(Dominican Republic) Oscar De La Cruz (AC)	1.73
K	(Dominican Republic) J.C. Mejía (TE)	18
IP	(Dominican Republic) Oscar De La Cruz (AC)	26.0
SV	(United States) Joe Corbett (TE)	7

=== Most Valuable Player ===
Player	Team	Source
(Dominican Republic) Eloy Jiménez	Toros del Este	

== Serie Final ==
The championship round is set for a best-of-seven series. Leones del Escogido won back-to-back championships in five games in this first ever meeting versus the Toro del Este in the Serie Final.

=== Summary ===
Leones win series 4–1

Game	Date	Time	Road team	Score	Home team	Stadium
1	21 January 2026	8:30 p.m. (Note: Originally scheduled for 7:15 p.m. start – delayed due to rain.)	Toros del Este	6–7	Leones del Escogido	Estadio Quisqueya
2	22 January 2026	8:00 p.m. (Note: Originally scheduled for 7:30 p.m. start – delayed due to rain.)	Leones del Escogido	7–4	Toros del Este	Estadio Francisco Micheli
3	25 January 2026 (Note: Originally scheduled for 23 January then on 24 January 2026 - postponed both days due to rain.)	7:15 p.m.	Toros del Este	3–2	Leones del Escogido	Estadio Quisqueya
4	26 January 2026	5:00 p.m.	Leones del Escogido	4–3 (11)	Toros del Este	Estadio Francisco Micheli
5	27 January 2026	7:15 p.m.	Toros del Este	0–1	Leones del Escogido	Estadio Quisqueya

=== Most Valuable Player ===
Player	Team	Source
(Venezuela) Alcides Escobar	Leones del Escogido	
