= 2024–25 LIDOM season =

2024–25 Dominican Professional Baseball League season
- League: LIDOM
- Sport: Baseball
- Duration: 16 October 2024 – 27 January 2025
- Games: 50 games (Serie Regular); 18 games (Serie Semifinal); Best-of-seven (Serie Final)
- Teams: 6
- Streaming partner: MLB.tv (United States)

Serie Regular
- Season champions: Estrellas Orientales
- Season MVP: Aderlin Rodríguez (Águilas Cibaeñas)

Serie Final
- Champions: Leones del Escogido (17th title)
- Runners-up: Tigres del Licey
- Finals MVP: Junior Caminero (Leones del Escogido)

Seasons
- 2025–26 →

The 2024–25 Dominican Professional Baseball League season is the 57th consecutive season of winter league baseball in the Dominican Republic, and 70th overall season. The regular season started on 16 October 2024 and ended 29 December 2024.

Tigres del Licey were the defending champions, having won their 24th championship during the 2023–24 season and back-to-back titles. They eventually lost in the Serie Final in their bid for a three-peat to their city rivals, Leones del Escogido. The Leones won their 17th championship and first since the 2015–16 season.

== Competition format ==
Each team plays a 50-game regular season schedule (Spanish: Serie Regular). The top four teams in the standings then play an 18-game round-robin playoff format (Spanish: Serie Semifinal), to determine the top two teams that will play the Serie Final. The Serie Final is set to be a best-of-nine series to determined the season championship to qualify for the 2025 Caribbean Series.

== Season review ==
The Tigres del Licey and Águilas Cibaeñas played three games as part of the Titanes del Caribe series on 10 November 2024, at Citi Field in Queens, New York, and 7-8 December 2024, at the Hiram Bithorn Stadium in San Juan, Puerto Rico. +

The Estrellas Orientales participated in the Choque de Gigantes, the weekend of 8–10 November 2024, at LoanDepot Park in Miami, Florida.

== Current teams ==
Dominican Professional Baseball League (LIDOM) teams locations

Team	City	Stadium	Capacity	Founded	Manager
Águilas Cibaeñas	Santiago de los Caballeros	Estadio Cibao	18,077	1933	Yadier Molina
Estrellas Orientales	San Pedro de Macorís	Estadio Tetelo Vargas	8,000	1910	Fernando Tatís
Gigantes del Cibao	San Francisco de Macorís	Estadio Julián Javier	12,000	1996	Wellington Cepeda
Leones del Escogido	Santo Domingo	Estadio Quisqueya	13,186	1921	Albert Pujols
Tigres del Licey	Santo Domingo	Estadio Quisqueya	13,186	1907	Gilbert Gómez
Toros del Este	La Romana	Estadio Francisco Micheli	8,838	1983	Carlos Febles

== Serie Regular ==
Each team plays 50 games in the regular season. A team's schedule is organized into 10 games versus each opponent, respectively, with 5 games at home and 5 games away against the same opponent.

As a result of postponements due to rain towards the final days of the season, LIDOM changed the Serie Final format from a best-of-nine to a best-of-seven series. The regular season was also extended until the 29 December 2024, to make up games that were postponed. Two games, Gigantes del Cibao v. Toros del Este (29 December) and Tigres del Licey v. Leones del Escogido (30 December), were cancelled due to these games not affecting standings at the end of the regular season which meant those four teams only played 49 games.

=== Standings ===
As of 30 December 2024

#	Team	GP	W	L	PCT.	GB	Home	Road	STK	RS	RA	DIFF.
1	Estrellas Orientales	50	30	20	.600	–	16–9	14–11	W3	229	189	+40
2	Águilas Cibaeñas	50	28	22	.560	2.0	14–11	14–11	L2	244	235	+9
3	Tigres del Licey	49*	27	22	.551	2.5	13–12	14–10	L1	211	165	+46
4	Leones del Escogido	49*	24	25	.490	5.5	12–12	12–13	W3	220	238	-18
5	Gigantes del Cibao	49*	22	27	.449	7.5	11–14	11–13	L2	226	237	-11
6	Toros del Este	49*	17	32	.347	12.5	7–17	10–15	P8	183	249	-66

Classified to Serie Semifinal

- Indicates game #50 cancelled as they did not affect standings.

=== Head to head ===
2024—25 Serie Regular record vs. opponents Source: LIDOM Standings Grid – 2024—25
Team	AC	EO	GC	LE	TL	TE
Águilas Cibaeñas	—	6-4	4-6	7-3	7-3	4-6
Estrellas Orientales	4-6	—	5-5	7-3	5-5	9-1
Gigantes del Cibao	6-4	5-5	—	3-7	4-6	4-5
Leones del Escogido	3-7	3-7	7-3	—	4-5	6-4
Tigres del Licey	3-7	5-5	6-4	4-5	—	9-1
Toros del Este	6-4	1-9	5-4	4-6	1-9	—

=== Schedule ===
Time zone: UTC−04:00

Week 1 – 16 to 20 October 2024
Date	Time	Road team	Result	Home team	Stadium
16 October 2024	7:00 p.m.	Águilas Cibaeñas	8–4	Gigantes del Cibao	Estadio Julián Javier
16 October 2024	7:15 p.m.	Tigres del Licey	2–3	Leones del Escogido	Estadio Quisqueya
16 October 2024	7:30 p.m.	Estrellas Orientales	3–1	Toros del Este	Estadio Francisco Micheli
17 October 2024	7:30 p.m.	Gigantes del Cibao	4–2	Tigres del Licey	Estadio Quisqueya
17 October 2024	7:30 p.m.	Toros del Este	4–2	Águilas Cibaeñas	Estadio Cibao
17 October 2024	7:30 p.m.	Leones del Escogido	Postponed	Estrellas Orientales	Estadio Tetelo Vargas
18 October 2024	6:15 p.m.	Estrellas Orientales	2–3	Leones del Escogido	Estadio Quisqueya
18 October 2024	7:00 p.m.	Tigres del Licey	4–3	Gigantes del Cibao	Estadio Julián Javier
18 October 2024	7:30 p.m.	Águilas Cibaeñas	2–3	Toros del Este	Estadio Francisco Micheli
19 October 2024	5:00 p.m.	Estrellas Orientales	5–10	Tigres del Licey	Estadio Quisqueya
19 October 2024	6:00 p.m.	Leones del Escogido	3–1	Águilas Cibaeñas	Estadio Cibao
19 October 2024	7:30 p.m.	Gigantes del Cibao	6–1	Toros del Este	Estadio Francisco Micheli
20 October 2024	4:00 p.m.	Gigantes del Cibao	6–0	Águilas Cibaeñas	Estadio Cibao
20 October 2024	5:00 p.m.	Leones del Escogido	6–3	Tigres del Licey	Estadio Quisqueya
20 October 2024	5:00 p.m.	Estrella Orientales	7–3	Toros del Este	Estadio Francisco Micheli

Week 2 – 21 to 27 October 2024
Date	Time	Road team	Result	Home team	Stadium
22 October 2024	7:00 p.m.	Leones del Escogido	9–6	Gigantes del Cibao	Estadio Julián Javier
22 October 2024	7:30 p.m.	Toros del Este	6–1	Tigres del Licey	Estadio Quisqueya
22 October 2024	7:30 p.m.	Águilas Cibaeñas	1–2	Estrellas Orientales	Estadio Tetelo Vargas
23 October 2024	7:15 p.m.	Gigantes del Cibao	2–4	Leones del Escogido	Estadio Quisqueya
23 October 2024	7:30 p.m.	Estrellas Orientales	Postponed	Águilas Cibaeñas	Estadio Cibao
23 October 2024	7:30 p.m.	Tigres del Licey	7–2	Toros del Este	Estadio Francisco Micheli
24 October 2024	7:00 p.m.	Toros del Este	3–4	Gigantes del Cibao	Estadio Julián Javier
24 October 2024	7:30 p.m.	Leones del Escogido	1–9	Estrella Orientales	Estadio Tetelo Vargas
25 October 2024	7:15 p.m.	Águilas Cibaeñas	8–5	Leones del Escogido	Estadio Quisqueya
25 October 2024	7:30 p.m.	Tigres del Licey	4–3	Estrellas Orientales	Estadio Tetelo Vargas
26 October 2024	4:00 p.m.	Toros del Este	3–2	Leones del Escogido	Estadio Quisqueya
26 October 2024	6:00 p.m.	Tigres del Licey	1–0	Águilas Cibaeñas	Estadio Cibao
26 October 2024	7:30 p.m.	Gigantes del Cibao	5–3	Estrellas Orientales	Estadio Tetelo Vargas
27 October 2024	5:00 p.m.	Águilas Cibaeñas	0–3	Tigres del Licey	Estadio Quisqueya
27 October 2024	5:00 p.m.	Estrellas Orientales	13–11	Gigantes del Cibao	Estadio Julián Javier
27 October 2024	5:00 p.m.	Leones del Escogido	9–4	Toros del Este	Estadio Francisco Micheli

Week 3 – 28 October to 3 November 2024
Date	Time	Road team	Result	Home team	Stadium
28 October 2024	7:30 p.m.	Estrellas Orientales	4–6	Águilas Cibaeñas	Estadio Cibao
29 October 2024	7:15 p.m.	Gigantes del Cibao	1–7	Leones del Escogido	Estadio Quisqueya
29 October 2024	7:30 p.m.	Estrellas Orientales	3–4	Águilas Cibaeñas	Estadio Cibao
29 October 2024	7:30 p.m.	Tigres del Licey	4–3	Toros del Este	Estadio Francisco Micheli
30 October 2024	7:00 p.m.	Leones del Escogido	6–0	Gigantes del Cibao	Estadio Julián Javier
30 October 2024	7:30 p.m.	Toros del Este	6–8	Tigres del Licey	Estadio Quisqueya
30 October 2024	7:30 p.m.	Águilas Cibaeñas	1–9	Estrellas Orientales	Estadio Tetelo Vargas
31 October 2024	7:00 p.m.	Estrellas Orientales	Postponed	Gigantes del Cibao	Estadio Julián Javier
1 November 2024	7:30 p.m.	Gigantes del Cibao	2–0	Tigres del Licey	Estadio Quisqueya
1 November 2024	7:30 p.m.	Leones del Escogido	3–1	Toros del Este	Estadio Francisco Micheli
2 November 2024	7:30 p.m.	Águilas Cibaeñas	3–1	Tigres del Licey	Estadio Quisqueya
2 November 2024	7:30 p.m.	Leones del Escogido	1–8	Estrellas Orientales	Estadio Tetelo Vargas
3 November 2024	4:00 p.m.	Toros del Este	8–11	Leones del Escogido	Estadio Quisqueya
3 November 2024	4:00 p.m.	Tigres del Licey	1–3	Águilas Cibaeñas	Estadio Cibao
3 November 2024	5:00 p.m.	Gigantes del Cibao	9–3	Estrellas Orientales	Estadio Tetelo Vargas

Week 4 – 4 to 10 November 2024
Date	Time	Road team	Result	Home team	Stadium
4 November 2024	4:00 p.m.	Tigres del Licey	Postponed	Leones del Escogido	Estadio Quisqueya
4 November 2024	5:00 p.m.	Águilas Cibaeñas	Postponed	Gigantes del Cibao	Estadio Julián Javier
4 November 2024	5:00 p.m.	Toros del Este	3–2	Estrellas Orientales	Estadio Tetelo Vargas
5 November 2024	7:30 p.m.	Estrellas Orientales	2–3	Tigres del Licey	Estadio Quisqueya
5 November 2024	7:30 p.m.	Leones del Escogido	2–1	Águilas Cibaeñas	Estadio Cibao
6 November 2024	7:00 p.m.	Tigres del Licey	3–4	Gigantes del Cibao	Estadio Julián Javier
6 November 2024	7:15 p.m.	Estrellas Orientales	4–6	Leones del Escogido	Estadio Quisqueya
6 November 2024	7:30 p.m.	Águilas Cibaeñas	16–5	Toros del Este	Estadio Francisco Micheli
7 November 2024	7:30 p.m.	Gigantes del Cibao	Postponed	Tigres del Licey	Estadio Quisqueya
7 November 2024	7:30 p.m.	Toros del Este	Postponed	Aguilas Cibaeñas	Estadio Cibao
8 November 2024	7:00 p.m.	Toros del Este	7–6	Gigantes del Cibao	Estadio Julián Javier
8 November 2024	7:30 p.m.	Aguilas Cibaeñas	Postponed	Tigres del Licey	Estadio Quisqueya
9 November 2024	4:00 p.m.	Leones del Escogido	7–0	Gigantes del Cibao	Estadio Julián Javier
10 November 2024	5:00 p.m.	Gigantes del Cibao	Postponed	Leones del Escogido	Estadio Quisqueya

Week 5 – 11 to 17 November 2024
Date	Time	Road team	Result	Home team	Stadium
12 November 2024	7:30 p.m.	Gigantes del Cibao	4–7	Tigres del Licey	Estadio Quisqueya
12 November 2024	7:30 p.m.	Toros del Este	7–6	Águilas Cibaeñas	Estadio Cibao
12 November 2024	7:30 p.m.	Leones del Escogido	2–5	Estrellas Orientales	Estadio Tetelo Vargas
13 November 2024	7:00 p.m.	Tigres del Licey	7–0	Gigantes del Cibao	Estadio Julián Javier
13 November 2024	7:15 p.m.	Estrellas Orientales	4–10	Leones del Escogido	Estadio Quisqueya
13 November 2024	7:30 p.m.	Águilas Cibaeñas	6–3	Toros del Este	Estadio Francisco Micheli
14 November 2024	7:00 p.m.	Estrellas Orientales	11–2	Gigantes del Cibao	Estadio Julián Javier
14 November 2024	7:30 p.m.	Toros del Este	5–4	Águilas Cibaeñas	Estadio Cibao
15 November 2024	7:30 p.m.	Estrellas Orientales	10–1	Águilas Cibaeñas	Estadio Cibao
15 November 2024	7:30 p.m.	Tigres del Licey	10–7	Toros del Este	Estadio Francisco Micheli
16 November 2024	4:00 p.m.	Águilas Cibaeñas	7–9	Leones del Escogido	Estadio Quisqueya
16 November 2024	5:00 p.m.	Toros del Este	2–10	Gigantes del Cibao	Estadio Julián Javier
16 November 2024	7:30 p.m.	Tigres del Licey	0–5	Estrellas Orientales	Estadio Tetelo Vargas
17 November 2024	5:00 p.m.	Leones del Escogido	8–13	Águilas Cibaeñas	Estadio Cibao
17 November 2024	5:00 p.m.	Estrellas Orientales	0–2	Tigres del Licey	Estadio Quisqueya
17 November 2024	5:00 p.m.	Gigantes del Cibao	1–5	Toros del Este	Estadio Francisco Micheli

Week 6 – 18 to 24 November 2024
Date	Time	Road team	Result	Home team	Stadium
18 November 2024	7:30 p.m.	Leones del Escogido	0–2	Tigres del Licey	Estadio Quisqueya
18 November 2024	7:30 p.m.	Gigantes del Cibao	13–5	Águilas Cibaeñas	Estadio Cibao
18 November 2024	7:30 p.m.	Toros del Este	1–8	Estrellas Orientales	Estadio Tetelo Vargas
19 November 2024	7:00 p.m.	Estrellas Orientales	8–9	Gigantes del Cibao	Estadio Julián Javier
19 November 2024	7:30 p.m.	Águilas Cibaeñas	4–1	Tigres del Licey	Estadio Quisqueya
20 November 2024	7:15 p.m.	Toros del Este	7–4	Leones del Escogido	Estadio Quisqueya
20 November 2024	7:30 p.m.	Tigres del Licey	3–6	Águilas Cibaeñas	Estadio Cibao
20 November 2024	7:30 p.m.	Gigantes del Cibao	9–10	Estrellas Orientales	Estadio Tetelo Vargas
22 November 2024	3:00 p.m.	Leones del Escogido	4–3	Toros del Este	Estadio Francisco Micheli
22 November 2024	7:00 p.m.	Águilas Cibaeñas	1–2	Gigantes del Cibao	Estadio Julián Javier
22 November 2024	7:30 p.m.	Estrellas Orientales	6–2	Tigres del Licey	Estadio Quisqueya
22 November 2024	7:30 p.m.	Leones del Escogido	2–3	Toros del Este	Estadio Francisco Micheli
23 November 2024	4:00 p.m.	Estrellas Orientales	6–3	Leones del Escogido	Estadio Quisqueya
23 November 2024	6:00 p.m.	Tigres del Licey	4–5	Águilas Cibaeñas	Estadio Cibao
23 November 2024	7:30 p.m.	Gigantes del Cibao	1–3	Toros del Este	Estadio Francisco Micheli
24 November 2024	5:00 p.m.	Águilas Cibaeñas	Postponed	Tigres del Licey	Estadio Quisqueya
24 November 2024	5:00 p.m.	Toros del Este	Postponed	Gigantes del Cibao	Estadio Julián Javier
24 November 2024	5:00 p.m.	Leones del Escogido	2–4	Estrellas Orientales	Estadio Tetelo Vargas

Week 7 – 25 November to 1 December 2024
Date	Time	Road team	Result	Home team	Stadium
25 November 2024	7:15 p.m.	Toros del Este	5–6	Leones del Escogido	Estadio Quisqueya
25 November 2024	7:30 p.m.	Gigantes del Cibao	1–3	Águilas Cibaeñas	Estadio Cibao
25 November 2024	7:30 p.m.	Tigres del Licey	3–2	Estrellas Orientales	Estadio Tetelo Vargas
26 November 2024	7:00 p.m.	Estrellas Orientales	4–1	Gigantes del Cibao	Estadio Julián Javier
26 November 2024	7:15 p.m.	Tigres del Licey	6–7	Leones del Escogido	Estadio Quisqueya
26 November 2024	7:30 p.m.	Águilas Cibaeñas	6–5	Toros del Este	Estadio Francisco Micheli
27 November 2024	7:30 p.m.	Gigantes del Cibao	5–3	Tigres del Licey	Estadio Quisqueya
28 November 2024	7:30 p.m.	Leones del Escogido	3–9	Águilas Cibaeñas	Estadio Cibao
28 November 2024	7:30 p.m.	Toros del Este	6–7	Estrellas Orientales	Estadio Tetelo Vargas
29 November 2024	7:00 p.m.	Leones del Escogido	2–7	Gigantes del Cibao	Estadio Julián Javier
29 November 2024	7:30 p.m.	Toros del Este	1–4	Tigres del Licey	Estadio Quisqueya
29 November 2024	7:30 p.m.	Águilas Cibaeñas	2–4	Estrellas Orientales	Estadio Tetelo Vargas
30 November 2024	4:00 p.m.	Gigantes del Cibao	4–10	Leones del Escogido	Estadio Quisqueya
30 November 2024	6:00 p.m.	Estrellas Orientales	0–5	Águilas Cibaeñas	Estadio Cibao
30 November 2024	7:30 p.m.	Tigres del Licey	9–2	Toros del Este	Estadio Francisco Micheli
1 December 2024	4:00 p.m.	Águilas Cibaeñas	11–2	Leones del Escogido	Estadio Quisqueya
1 December 2024	5:00 p.m.	Toros del Este	4–3	Estrellas Orientales	Estadio Tetelo Vargas
1 December 2024	6:00 p.m.	Tigres del Licey	7–6	Gigantes del Cibao	Estadio Julián Javier

Week 8 – 2 to 8 December 2024
Date	Time	Road team	Result	Home team	Stadium
2 December 2024	7:30 p.m.	Gigantes del Cibao	1–8	Tigres del Licey	Estadio Quisqueya
3 December 2024	7:30 p.m.	Leones del Escogido	7–8	Tigres del Licey	Estadio Quisqueya
3 December 2024	7:30 p.m.	Toros del Este	6–2	Águilas Cibaeñas	Estadio Cibao
3 December 2024	7:30 p.m.	Gigantes del Cibao	Postponed	Estrellas Orientales	Estadio Tetelo Vargas
4 December 2024	7:00 p.m.	Tigres del Licey	Postponed	Gigantes del Cibao	Estadio Julián Javier
4 December 2024	7:15 p.m.	Estrellas Orientales	3–0	Leones del Escogido	Estadio Quisqueya
4 December 2024	7:30 p.m.	Águilas Cibaeñas	2–6	Toros del Este	Estadio Francisco Micheli
5 December 2024	7:15 p.m.	Toros del Este	9–4	Leones del Escogido	Estadio Quisqueya
5 December 2024	7:30 p.m.	Tigres del Licey	3–4	Águilas Cibaeñas	Estadio Cibao
5 December 2024	7:30 p.m.	Gigantes del Cibao	11–0	Estrellas Orientales	Estadio Tetelo Vargas
6 December 2024	7:00 p.m.	Estrellas Orientales	2–1	Gigantes del Cibao	Estadio Julián Javier
6 December 2024	7:30 p.m.	Leones del Escogido	6–1	Toros del Este	Estadio Francisco Micheli
7 December 2024	5:00 p.m.	Toros del Este	3–6	Gigantes del Cibao	Estadio Julián Javier
7 December 2024	7:30 p.m.	Leones del Escogido	2–3	Estrellas Orientales	Estadio Tetelo Vargas
8 December 2024	4:00 p.m.	Gigantes del Cibao	5–4	Leones del Escogido	Estadio Quisqueya
8 December 2024	5:00 p.m.	Estrellas Orientales	4–1	Toros del Este	Estadio Francisco Micheli

Week 9 – 9 to 15 December 2024
Date	Time	Road team	Result	Home team	Stadium
10 December 2024	7:00 p.m.	Águilas Cibaeñas	15–9	Gigantes del Cibao	Estadio Julián Javier
10 December 2024	7:15 p.m.	Tigres del Licey	6–2	Leones del Escogido	Estadio Quisqueya
11 December 2024	7:30 p.m.	Águilas Cibaeñas	4–3	Tigres del Licey	Estadio Quisqueya
11 December 2024	7:30 p.m.	Gigantes del Cibao	2–3	Toros del Este	Estadio Francisco Micheli
12 December 2024	7:30 p.m.	Leones del Escogido	3–5	Águilas Cibaeñas	Estadio Cibao
12 December 2024	7:30 p.m.	Gigantes del Cibao	4–1	Estrellas Orientales	Estadio Tetelo Vargas
13 December 2024	7:00 p.m.	Toros del Este	Postponed	Gigantes del Cibao	Estadio Julián Javier
13 December 2024	7:15 p.m.	Águilas Cibaeñas	7–3	Leones del Escogido	Estadio Quisqueya
13 December 2024	7:30 p.m.	Tigres del Licey	1–4	Estrellas Orientales	Estadio Tetelo Vargas
14 December 2024	5:00 p.m.	Estrellas Orientales	4–1	Tigres del Licey	Estadio Quisqueya
14 December 2024	6:00 p.m.	Toros del Este	3–12	Águilas Cibaeñas	Estadio Cibao
15 December 2024	4:00 p.m.	Tigres del Licey	6–2	Leones del Escogido	Estadio Quisqueya
15 December 2024	5:00 p.m.	Águilas Cibaeñas	4–8	Gigantes del Cibao	Estadio Julián Javier
15 December 2024	5:00 p.m.	Estrellas Orientales	6–4	Toros del Este	Estadio Francisco Micheli

Week 10 – 16 to 30 December 2024
Date	Time	Road team	Result	Home team	Stadium
16 December 2024	7:00 p.m.	Leones del Escogido	1–13	Gigantes del Cibao	Estadio Julián Javier
16 December 2024	7:30 p.m.	Toros del Este	0–6	Tigres del Licey	Estadio Quisqueya
16 December 2024	7:30 p.m.	Águilas Cibaeñas	8–2	Estrellas Orientales	Estadio Tetelo Vargas
17 December 2024	7:00 p.m.	Toros del Este	1–5	Gigantes del Cibao	Estadio Julián Javier
17 December 2024	7:30 p.m.	Águilas Cibaeñas	3–25	Tigres del Licey	Estadio Quisqueya
18 December 2024	7:30 p.m.	Leones del Escogido	Postponed	Tigres del Licey	Estadio Quisqueya
18 December 2024	7:30 p.m.	Gigantes del Cibao	2–8	Águilas Cibaeñas	Estadio Cibao
18 December 2024	7:30 p.m.	Toros del Este	Postponed	Estrellas Orientales	Estadio Tetelo Vargas
19 December 2024	7:30 p.m.	Toros del Este	3–4	Tigres del Licey	Estadio Quisqueya
19 December 2024	7:30 p.m.	Águilas Cibaeñas	8–6	Estrellas Orientales	Estadio Tetelo Vargas
20 December 2024	6:15 p.m.	Gigantes del Cibao	Postponed	Leones del Escogido	Estadio Quisqueya
20 December 2024	7:30 p.m.	Estrellas Orientales	5–6	Águilas Cibaeñas	Estadio Cibao
20 December 2024	7:30 p.m.	Tigres del Licey	Postponed	Toros del Este	Estadio Francisco Micheli
21 December 2024	4:00 p.m.	Águilas Cibaeñas	5–4	Leones del Escogido	Estadio Quisqueya
21 December 2024	7:30 p.m.	Tigres del Licey	Postponed	Estrellas Orientales	Estadio Tetelo Vargas
21 December 2024	7:30 p.m.	Gigantes del Cibao	Postponed	Toros del Este	Estadio Francisco Micheli
22 December 2024	5:00 p.m.	Leones del Escogido	4–3	Tigres del Licey	Estadio Quisqueya
22 December 2024	5:00 p.m.	Águilas Cibaeñas	0–8	Gigantes del Cibao	Estadio Julián Javier
22 December 2024	5:00 p.m.	Estrellas Orientales	4–3	Toros del Este	Estadio Francisco Micheli
23 December 2024	11:00 a.m.	Toros del Este	3–4	Estrellas Orientales	Estadio Tetelo Vargas
23 December 2024	3:00 p.m.	Gigantes del Cibao	3–1	Águilas Cibaeñas	Estadio Cibao
23 December 2024	4:00 p.m.	Tigres del Licey	Postponed	Leones del Escogido	Estadio Quisqueya
26 December 2024	7:00 p.m.	Tigres del Licey	5–3	Gigantes del Cibao	Estadio Julián Javier
27 December 2024	7:30 p.m.	Leones del Escogido	8–2	Tigres de Licey	Estadio Quisqueya
28 December 2024	4:00 p.m.	Gigantes del Cibao	3–8	Leones del Escogido	Estadio Quisqueya
28 December 2024	5:00 p.m.	Tigres del Licey	2–1	Toros del Este	Estadio Francisco Micheli
29 December 2024	5:00 p.m.	Gigantes del Cibao	Cancelled	Toros del Este	Estadio Francisco Micheli
29 December 2024	5:00 p.m.	Tigres del Licey	1–2	Estrellas Orientales	Estadio Tetelo Vargas
30 December 2024	7:15 p.m.	Tigres del Licey	Cancelled	Leones del Escogido	Estadio Quisqueya

=== Serie Regular stats ===
==== League leaders ====
As of 1 January 2025

Hitting leaders
Stat	Player	Team	Total
AVG	(United States) J.C. Escarra	Águilas Cibaeñas	.363
HR	Two tied		8
RBI	(Dominican Republic) Aderlin Rodríguez	Águilas Cibaeñas	28
R	(Dominican Republic) Emilio Bonifacio	Tigres del Licey	33
H	(Dominican Republic) Emilio Bonifacio	Tigres del Licey	55
SB	(Dominican Republic) Johan Rojas	Gigantes del Cibao	23

Pitching leaders
Stat	Player	Team	Total
W	(Dominican Republic) Enny Romero	Águilas Cibaeñas	6
L	Two tied		5
ERA	(Dominican Republic) Enny Romero	Águilas Cibaeñas	1.24
K	(Colombia) Nabil Crismatt	Gigantes del Cibao	49
IP	(Colombia) Nabil Crismatt	Gigantes del Cibao	54.1
SV	(Dominican Republic) J. C. Mejía	Tigres del Licey	13

==== Weekly Awards ====
Player of the Week – Position
Week	Player	Position	Team	Source
Week 1	(United States) Jordan Lawlar	SS	Tigres del Licey	
Week 2	(Dominican Republic) Ramón Hernández	DH	Tigres del Licey	
Week 3	(Dominican Republic) Starlin Castro	SS	Águilas Cibaeñas	
Week 4	(Dominican Republic) Sandro Fabián	RF	Toros del Este	
Week 5	(Dominican Republic) Sandro Fabián	RF	Toros del Este	
Week 6	(Dominican Republic) Eguy Rosario	3B	Estrellas Orientales	
Week 7	(Dominican Republic) Aderlin Rodríguez	1B	Águilas Cibaeñas	
Week 8	(Dominican Republic) Kelvin Gutiérrez	3B	Gigantes del Cibao	
Week 9	(Dominican Republic) Aderlin Rodríguez	1B	Águilas Cibaeñas	
Week 10	(Dominican Republic) Carlos Franco	1B	Gigantes del Cibao	

Player of the Week – Pitcher
Week	Player	Position	Team	Source
Week 1	(Dominican Republic) Enny Romero	LHP	Águilas Cibaeñas	
Week 2	(United States) Steve Moyers	LHP	Tigres del Licey	
Week 3	(Colombia) Nabil Crismatt	RHP	Gigantes del Cibao	
Week 4	(Dominican Republic) Víctor Santos	RHP	Leones del Escogido	
Week 5	(Dominican Republic) Esmil Rogers	RHP	Toros del Este	
Week 6	(United States) Braulio Torres	LHP	Águilas Cibaeñas	
Week 7	(Dominican Republic) Enny Romero	LHP	Águilas Cibaeñas	
Week 8	(Colombia) Nabil Crismatt	RHP	Gigantes del Cibao	
Week 9	(Dominican Republic) Luis Moreno	RHP	Estrellas Orientales	
Week 10	(Dominican Republic) Wily Peralta	RHP	Gigantes del Cibao	

==== Serie Regular Awards & Honors ====
Award	Player	Team	Source
Rookie of the Year	(Dominican Republic) Luis Moreno	Estrellas Orientales	
Mr. Congeniality of the Year	(Dominican Republic) Kelvin Gutiérrez	Gigantes del Cibao	
General Manager of the Year	(Dominican Republic) Ángel Ovalles	Águilas Cibaeñas	
Manager of the Year	(Dominican Republic) Fernando Tatís	Estrellas Orientales	
Pitcher of the Year	(Dominican Republic) Enny Romero	Águilas Cibaeñas	
Most Valuable Player	(Dominican Republic) Aderlin Rodríguez	Águilas Cibaeñas	

== Serie Semifinal ==
Each team plays 18 games round-robin schedule. A team's schedule is organized into 6 games versus each opponent, respectively, with 3 games at home and 3 games away against the same opponent.

As a result of Tigres del Licey and Leones del Escogido classifying to the Serie Final in the 14th game and 15th game, respectively, the final three games of this round-robin for each team were cancelled as they were not necessary.

=== Standings ===
As of 19 January 2025

#	Team	GP	W	L	PCT.	GB	Home	Road	STK	RS	RA	DIFF.
1	Tigres del Licey	15	11	4	.734	–	5–3	6–1	L1	60	59	+1
2	Leones del Escogido	15	10	5	.667	1.0	4–3	6–2	W1	99	57	+42
3	Estrellas Orientales	15	5	10	.333	6.0	3–5	2–5	L6	59	75	-16
4	Águilas Cibaeñas	15	4	11	.267	7.0	2–5	2–6	W2	42	69	-27

Classified to Serie Final

=== Head to head ===
2024—25 Serie Semifinal record vs. opponents Source: LIDOM Standings Grid – 2024—25
Team	AC	EO	LE	TL
Águilas Cibaeñas	—	2-3	2-3	0-5
Estrellas Orientales	3-2	—	1-4	1-4
Leones del Escogido	3-2	4-1	—	3-2
Tigres del Licey	5-0	4-1	2-3	—

=== Schedule ===
Time zone: UTC−04:00

Week 1 – 2 to 8 January 2025
Date	Time	Road team	Result	Home team	Stadium
2 January 2025	7:30 p.m.	Águilas Cibaeñas	1–5	Tigres del Licey	Estadio Quisqueya
2 January 2025	7:30 p.m.	Leones del Escogido	0–4	Estrellas Orientales	Estadio Tetelo Vargas
3 January 2025	7:30 p.m.	Estrellas Orientales	6–4	Tigres del Licey	Estadio Quisqueya
3 January 2025	7:30 p.m.	Leones del Escogidos	4–2	Águilas Cibaeñas	Estadio Cibao
4 January 2025	4:00 p.m.	Águilas Cibaeñas	7–6	Leones del Escogido	Estadio Quisqueya
4 January 2025	7:30 p.m.	Tigres del Licey	4–3	Estrellas Orientales	Estadio Tetelo Vargas
5 January 2025	4:00 p.m.	Estrellas Orientales	3–8	Leones del Escogido	Estadio Quisqueya
5 January 2025	5:00 p.m.	Tigres del Licey	7–0	Águilas Cibaeñas	Estadio Cibao
6 January 2025	4:00 p.m.	Tigres del Licey	7–6	Leones del Escogido	Estadio Quisqueya
6 January 2025	5:00 p.m.	Águilas Cibaeñas	2–3	Estrellas Orientales	Estadio Tetelo Vargas
7 January 2025	7:30 p.m.	Leones del Escogido	8–1	Tigres del Licey	Estadio Quisqueya
7 January 2025	7:30 p.m.	Estrellas Orientales	6–0	Águilas Cibaeñas	Estadio Cibao
8 January 2025	7:30 p.m.	Águilas Cibaeñas	0–1	Tigres del Licey	Estadio Quisqueya
8 January 2025	7:30 p.m.	Leones del Escogido	12–6	Estrellas Orientales	Estadio Tetelo Vargas

Week 2 – 10 to 15 January 2025
Date	Time	Road team	Result	Home team	Stadium
10 January 2025	7:30 p.m.	Estrellas Orientales	1–6	Tigres del Licey	Estadio Quisqueya
10 January 2025	7:30 p.m.	Leones del Escogido	8–6	Águilas Cibaeñas	Estadio Cibao
11 January 2025	4:00 p.m.	Tigres del Licey	5–4	Leones del Escogido	Estadio Quisqueya
11 January 2025	7:30 p.m.	Águilas Cibaeñas	7–8	Estrellas Orientales	Estadio Tetelo Vargas
12 January 2025	4:00 p.m.	Águilas Cibaeñas	0–9	Leones del Escogido	Estadio Quisqueya
12 January 2025	5:00 p.m.	Tigres del Licey	5–4	Estrellas Orientales	Estadio Tetelo Vargas
13 January 2025	7:30 p.m.	Leones del Escogido	14–2	Tigres del Licey	Estadio Quisqueya
13 January 2025	7:30 p.m.	Estrellas Orientales	1–6	Águilas Cibaeñas	Estadio Cibao
14 January 2025	7:15 p.m.	Estrellas Orientales	6–10	Leones del Escogido	Estadio Quisqueya
14 January 2025	7:30 p.m.	Tigres del Licey	1–0	Águilas Cibaeñas	Estadio Cibao
15 January 2025	7:30 p.m.	Águilas Cibaeñas	3–4	Tigres del Licey	Estadio Quisqueya
15 January 2025	7:30 p.m.	Leones del Escogido	2–1	Estrellas Orientales	Estadio Tetelo Vargas

Week 3 – 17 to 21 January 2025
Date	Time	Road team	Result	Home team	Stadium
17 January 2025	7:30 p.m.	Estrellas Orientales	1–2	Tigres del Licey	Estadio Quisqueya
17 January 2025	7:30 p.m.	Leones del Escogido	0–1	Águilas Cibaeñas	Estadio Cibao
18 January 2025	3:00 p.m.	Tigres del Licey	6–8	Leones del Escogido	Estadio Quisqueya
18 January 2025	7:30 p.m.	Águilas Cibaeñas	7–6	Estrellas Orientales	Estadio Tetelo Vargas
19 January 2025	5:00 p.m.	Leones del Escogido	Cancelled	Tigres del Licey	Estadio Quisqueya
19 January 2025	5:00 p.m.	Estrellas Orientales	Cancelled	Águilas Cibaeñas	Estadio Cibao
20 January 2025	7:15 p.m.	Águilas Cibaeñas	Cancelled	Leones del Escogido	Estadio Quisqueya
20 January 2025	7:30 p.m.	Tigres del Licey	Cancelled	Estrellas Orientales	Estadio Tetelo Vargas
21 January 2025	4:00 p.m.	Estrellas Orientales	Cancelled	Leones del Escogido	Estadio Quisqueya
21 January 2025	5:00 p.m.	Tigres del Licey	Cancelled	Águilas Cibaeñas	Estadio Cibao

=== Serie Semifinal stats ===
==== League leaders ====
As of 21 January 2025

Hitting leaders
Stat	Player	Team	Total
AVG	(Dominican Republic) Junior Caminero	Leones del Escogido	.448
HR	(Dominican Republic) Sergio Alcántara	Tigres del Licey	4
RBI	(Dominican Republic) Jean Segura	Leones del Escogido	15
R	(Dominican Republic) Junior Caminero	Leones del Escogido	17
H	(Dominican Republic) Junior Caminero	Leones del Escogido	26
SB	(Dominican Republic) Erik Gonzalez	Leones del Escogido	6

Pitching leaders
Stat	Player	Team	Total
W	Three tied		2
L	Two tied		2
ERA	(Dominican Republic) Esmil Rogers	Estrellas Orientales	1.32
K	Two tied		11
IP	(Dominican Republic) Johnny Cueto	Leones del Escogido	15.0
SV	(Dominican Republic) J. C. Mejía	Tigres del Licey	4

==== Most Valuable Player of Serie Semifinal ====
Player	Team	Source
(Dominican Republic) Junior Caminero	Leones del Escogido	

== Serie Final ==
The championship round was set for a best-of-seven-games series played between the Tigres del Licey and Leones del Escogido. All games were played at Estadio Quisqueya Juan Marichal as both teams share stadium; however, Tigres del Licey had home field advantage. This was the tenth meeting in the Serie Final for both teams from the Capital, with Tigres winning sixth of the nine meetings played.

=== Summary ===
Leones win series 4–3

Game	Date	Time	Road team	Result	Home team	Stadium
1	20 January 2025	7:30 p.m.	Leones del Escogido	3–4 (14)	Tigres del Licey	Estadio Quisqueya
2	21 January 2025	7:15 p.m.	Tigres del Licey	2–3	Leones del Escogido	Estadio Quisqueya
3	22 January 2025	7:30 p.m.	Leones del Escogido	6–0	Tigres del Licey	Estadio Quisqueya
4	24 January 2025	7:15 p.m.	Tigres del Licey	9–3	Leones del Escogido	Estadio Quisqueya
5	25 January 2025	7:30 p.m.	Leones del Escogido	4–1	Tigres del Licey	Estadio Quisqueya
6	26 January 2025	7:15 p.m.	Tigres del Licey	7–4 (13)	Leones del Escogido	Estadio Quisqueya
7	27 January 2025	7:30 p.m.	Leones del Escogido	6–5	Tigres del Licey	Estadio Quisqueya

=== Most Valuable Player of Serie Final ===
Player	Team	Source
(Dominican Republic) Junior Caminero	Leones del Escogido	
