= Sport in the Dominican Republic =

Sports are a central part of the culture of the Dominican Republic, and have been practiced in the whole country since the native inhabitants were living in the island. Sports play a key role in the culture and makeup of Dominican Republic society. Baseball is the most popular sport on the island country and Major League Baseball has been recruiting players from the Dominican Republic since the 1960s. Basketball, football, volleyball, and boxing are other sports played in the country.

== Baseball ==
Baseball is the most popular sport in the Dominican Republic today. After the United States, the Dominican Republic has the second-highest number of baseball players in Major League Baseball (MLB).

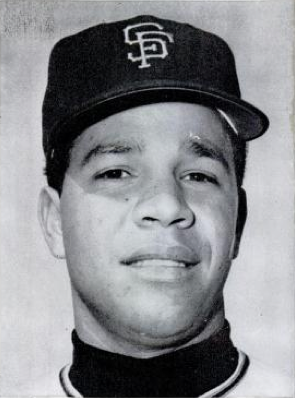
Juan Marichal AKA the "Dominican Dandy".

Although the sport was first seen in Latin America in Cuba, baseball began to flourish in the Dominican Republic when the United States Marine Corps occupied the island from 1916 to 1924. The first players of the game in the Dominican Republic were the upper-class Dominican boys who studied in the United States and played the game of baseball when they returned to the Dominican Republic. In the early 1900s, there were two baseball clubs named Nuevo Club and Ozama that were head and shoulders above the competition. However, a group called Licey emerged and it would become one of the finest sporting institutions in the Dominican Republic. With the arrival of Licey in 1907 thousands of people showed up for their games with the other self-organized teams in the country. They became great entertainment for citizens from all economic backgrounds. In 1912, Nuevo Club won the first baseball championship in Santo Domingo. Between the years of 1907–1920, the sport of baseball was played in the Dominican Republic for fun and the players played for "the love of the game." However, in 1921 the teams began to collect money from spectators and the championship game that year brought in over $7,000 and commercial pressures led to the sport becoming a semi-profession in the Dominican Republic. Rafael Trujillo became president of the Dominican Republic in 1930 and he helped baseball soar in popularity as the sport gained a political connection. By the end of the 1930s, many of the finest Negro league players from the United States and Cuban players played baseball in the summer in the Dominican Republic as they were paid a fortune in order to come play. Jackie Robinson broke the color barrier in Major League Baseball in 1947 and soon after teams from MLB began sending scouts to watch Dominican players play.

Between 1955 and 1980 there were 49 players from the Dominican Republic who played in MLB. However, in the 1980s hundreds of players started coming to the United States as there became "working relationships between North American and Dominican teams." The first great pitcher from the Dominican Republic who starred in the United States was Juan Marichal who is nicknamed the "Dominican Dandy". He began his playing career in MLB in 1960 after he was signed from the Dominican Republic by the San Francisco Giants. The first great hitter from the Dominican Republic was Felipe Alou who hit 206 career home runs. Free agency in MLB, which began in 1976, and the rise of baseball academies in the Dominican Republic have changed Dominican baseball. For years, owners of traditional Dominican teams have been underpaying their players; however, since the salary of Major League Baseball players has gone up dramatically, players who once played in the Dominican Winter Baseball League are no longer playing and instead trying to sign contracts with teams from MLB.

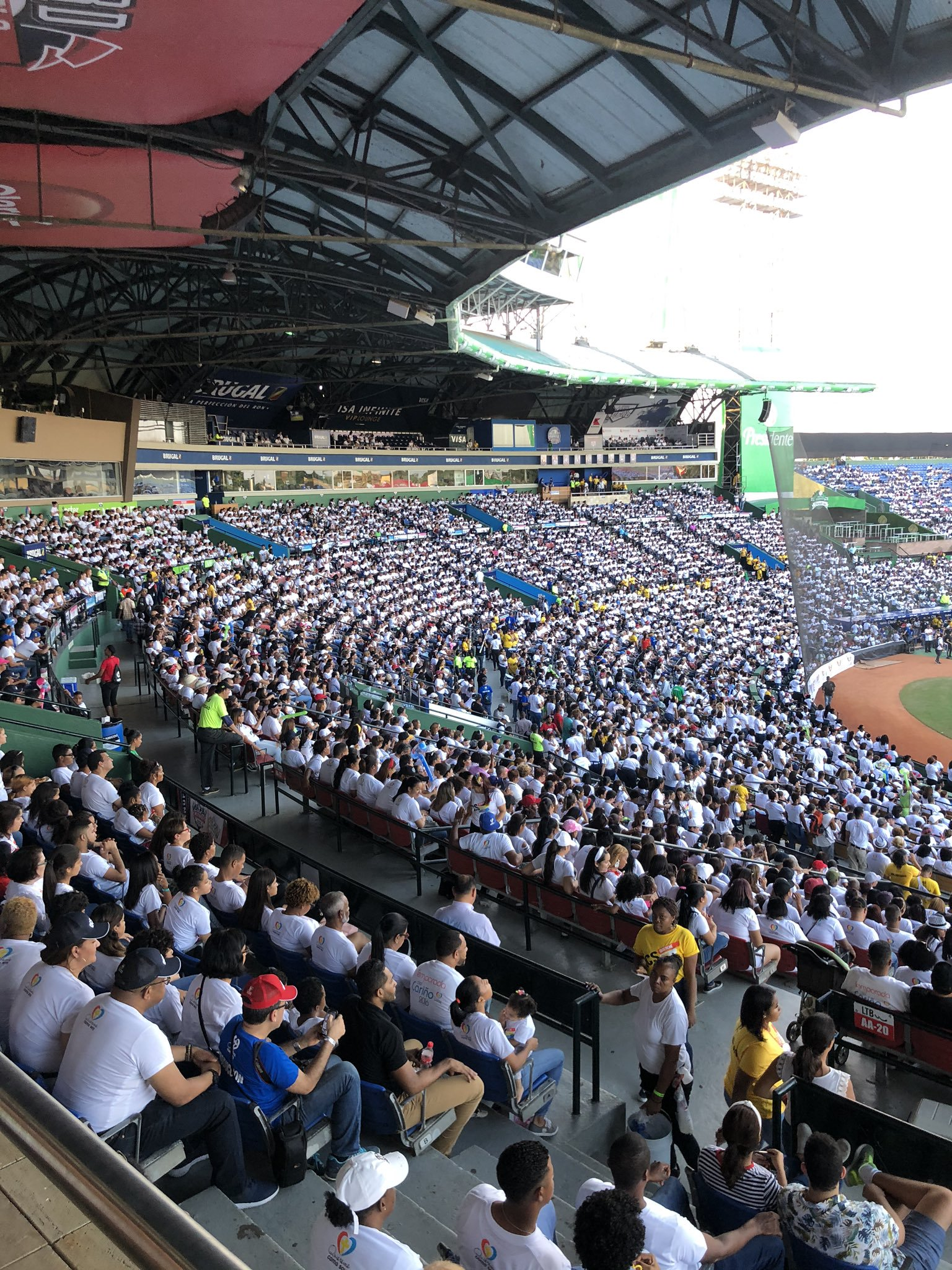
People in the baseball stadium of Santo Domingo, Dominican Republic.

Historian Alan Klein wrote in his book Sugarball, "Nothing typifies the new direction of Dominican baseball as much as the baseball academy, an institution rooted in the increased presence and benevolent paternalism of North American baseball interests in the country." The first baseball academy in the Dominican Republic was built in 1977 by Ralph Avila. In his description of baseball academies in the Dominican Republic, Klein wrote "What the academy does in working with the Dominican players goes beyond teaching baseball skills. They teach career preparation, socialization and how to cope with the cultural changes they will face in the United States." Campo Las Palmas is the best is the best-run academy on the island and it is owned by the Los Angeles Dodgers.

The Dominican Republic has its own baseball league, the Dominican Winter Baseball League, which runs its season from October to January. It comprises six teams: Águilas Cibaeñas (Cibao Eagles), Estrellas Orientales (Eastern Stars), Gigantes del Cibao (Cibao Giants), Leones del Escogido (Chosen Lions), Tigres del Licey (Licey Tigers), and Toros del Este (Eastern Bulls). The league started in 1956 when the Dominican League switched from playing in the summers to playing in the winters. Many MLB and minor league players play in the Dominican League during their own off-season. However, as of late the league has struggled financially as "more of the established native players sit out and too many of the reinforcements fail to last the season. Attendance is down and the country's economic crisis has intruded the parks."

The Dominican Republic has participated in the Baseball World Cup, winning one Gold (1949), three Silver (1942, 1950, 1952), and two Bronze (1943, 1969), placing it seventh, right after Puerto Rico's one Gold, four Silver, and four Bronze. (Cuba holds a record twenty-five Gold, two Silver and two Bronze.)

The country also participated in the 2006 World Baseball Classic, the inaugural tournament, in which they finished semi–finalists along with Korea. In the 2013 World Baseball Classic, the Dominican Republic became the first team to win the event undefeated. They beat Puerto Rico in the Championship game to win the 2013 World Baseball Classic. In 2017, The Dominican Republic participated in the World Baseball Classic and made it to the second round. However, a highlight from the 2017 World Baseball Classic was when the Dominican Republic played the United States and won 7 to 5 in front of a record 37,446 fans at Marlins Park in Miami, Florida.

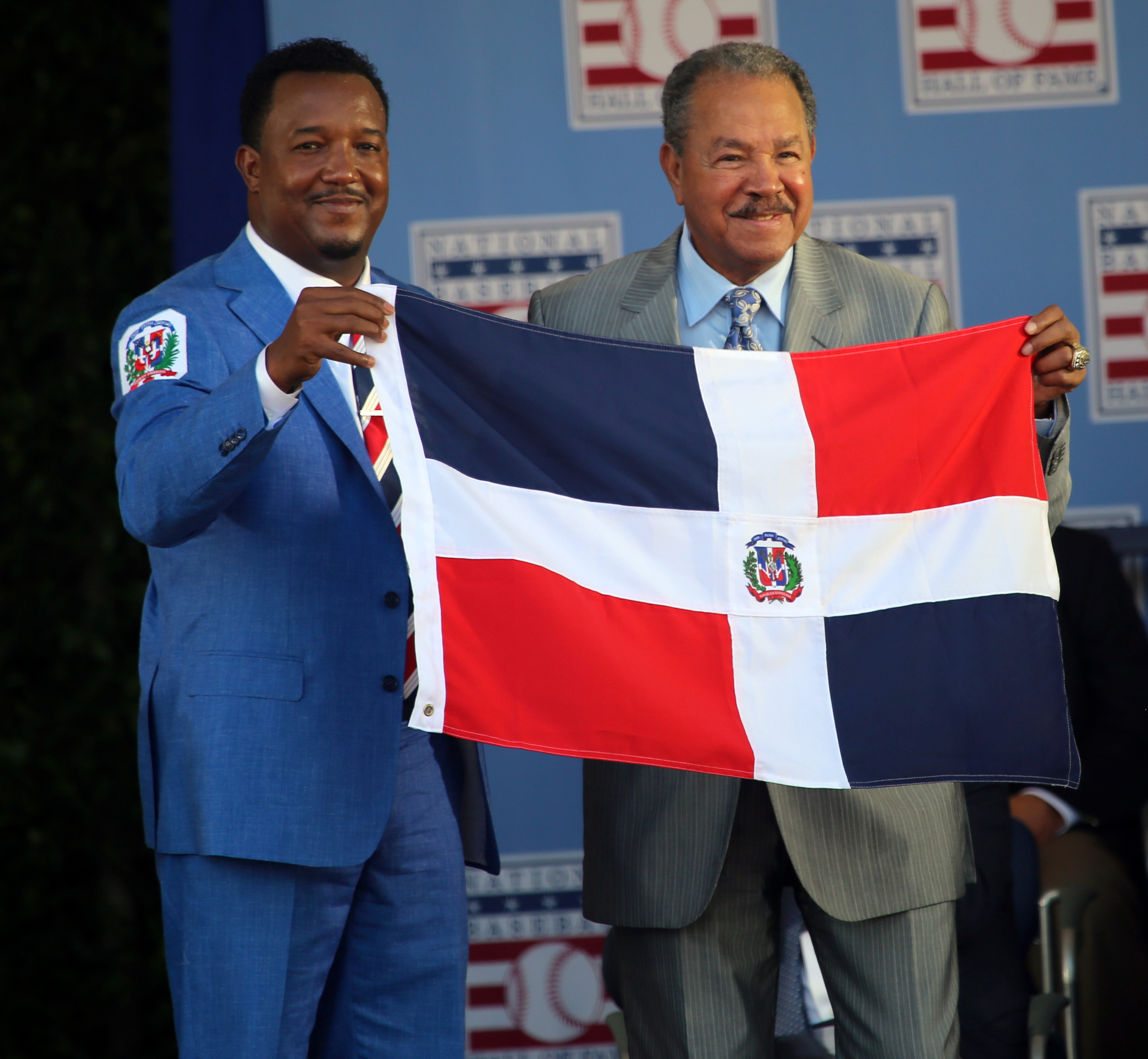
Dominican icons – Pedro Martínez and Juan Marichal – together on stage with the Dominican flag.

Although thousands of players from the island have played in MLB, only 4 have been inducted into The National Baseball Hall of Fame. Those players are Juan Marichal, Vladimir Guerrero, David Ortiz and Pedro Martínez.

== Football ==
Football is also a popular sport in the Dominican Republic. The governing body is the Federación Dominicana de Fútbol. The Liga Dominicana de Fútbol is the top division of the Federación Dominicana de Fútbol. There have been a couple of FIFA Goal Programme projects that have been designed to further improve the infrastructure and facilities in the country in recent years. Notable Dominican Footballers include Mariano Díaz and Junior Firpo, who both play in La Liga, and Jonathan Faña, who is currently the top scorer of the national team of the Dominican Republic national football team. Association Football is most popular among recent immigrants from Haiti and other countries, but most people of Haitian ancestry who have lived most of their life in Dominican Republic− prefer baseball similar to the majority of Dominicans.

Recently, football has seen growing successes in the Dominican Republic, notably with the Dominican Republic national under-20 football team qualified for the 2023 FIFA U-20 World Cup, the country's first-ever major FIFA appearance. Dominican Republic also competed at the 2024 Summer Olympics for the first time as well, thanks for the U-20 team's result in the 2022 CONCACAF U-20 Championship.

== Basketball ==
The Dominican Republic has had a successful national team which advanced to the second stage at the 2019 Basketball World Cup after they surprisingly eliminated Germany 70–68.

The National Federation of Basketball holds every year a professional league, the National Basketball League, LNB (Spanish: "Liga Nacional de Baloncesto"). The National Basketball Association (NBA) have some players who represent the Dominican Republic, such as:

- Francisco García, guard–forward for the Sacramento Kings; first round pick in the 2005 NBA draft
- Al Horford, power forward, third overall pick by the Atlanta Hawks in the 2007 NBA draft
- Karl-Anthony Towns, center, first overall pick by the Minnesota Timberwolves in the 2015 NBA draft.
- Ángel Delgado, center for the Los Angeles Clippers, went undrafted in the 2018 NBA Draft.

The country hosted 2005 FIBA Americas Championship.

== Boxing ==
Boxing is an important sport, and the country has produced scores of world-class fighters and world champions, both professionals and amateurs, among them Carlos Teo Cruz, Leo Cruz, Julio César Green, Joan Guzmán, and Juan Carlos Payano.

== Volleyball ==
Volleyball was introduced by U.S. Marines in 1916. The first international competition came in 1934 in Port-au-Prince, Haiti with the Caribbean Volleyball Tournament. The most important goal for the women's team was winning the gold medal at the 2003 Panamerican Games. Starting from 2007, the Dominican Volleyball Federation holds the Dominican Volleyball League every year. It is a professional volleyball league with eight participating teams in both genders. As of 2014, The women's senior team is ranked 7th. in the FIVB ranking and the men's senior team is ranked 33rd.

Many Dominicans play at international clubs in America, Europe and Asia, like Brenda Castillo, Bethania de la Cruz and Elvis Contreras.

== Olympics ==
The first Olympic participation was in 1964 with just one athlete, Alberto Torres de la Mota ("El Gringo" ) in track & field (100 m). The first medallist was the boxer Pedro Julio Nolasco who won the bronze medal in the 1984 Olympic Games. The first gold medal, and second medal, came by the two-time world champion 400 m hurdles Félix Sánchez in the 2004 Olympic Games. The recent and more successful Olympiad, Beijing 2008, boxer Manuel Félix Díaz and the taekwondo practitioner Gabriel Mercedes won gold and silver medals respectively. Marileidy Paulino won a silver medal in the women's 400m dash at the 2020 Olympic Games. She also won a silver medal with Lidio Andrés Feliz, Anabel Medina, Luguelín Santos and Alexander Ogando in the mixed Mixed 4 × 400 metres relay. The Dominican Republic Olympic Committee (DROC) is represented by its president Mr. Luis Mejía Oviedo.

== Pan American Games ==
The Dominican Republic hosted the 2003 Pan American Games in Santo Domingo. The United States finished with the most medals. The games featured 338 events in 35 sports.

== Central American and Caribbean Games ==
Dominican Republic hosted two Central American and Caribbean Games, the editions of 1974 at Santo Domingo, and the 1986 at Santiago de los Caballeros and will host the 2026 edition.

== Other sports ==
Luis Castillo, defensive end played in the National Football League for the San Diego Chargers. Castillo was the cover athlete for the Spanish language version of Madden NFL 08.

Rugby union is a minor sport, but there is a Dominican Republic side, which has played at least one international.

Other sports include combat sports of judo, and professional wrestlers Arcadio Brito, Jack Veneno and Bronco # 1.

In 2014, Víctor Estrella became the nation's first top 100 tennis player.

== Historical sports ==
Though no longer played much, cricket was played to some extent by immigrants from the West Indies. The game of "la plaquita" or "la placa", a popular informal Dominican bat-and-ball game, descends from cricket.

== Stadiums in the Dominican Republic ==
#	Stadium	Location	Country	Capacity	Tenants	Image
1	Estadio Olímpico Félix Sánchez	Santo Domingo	Dominican Republic	27,000	Atlético Pantoja, SEDOFUTBOL, O&M FC	
2	Estadio La Barranquita	Santiago de los Caballeros	Dominican Republic	20,000		
3	Estadio Cibao	Santiago de los Caballeros	Dominican Republic	18,077	Águilas Cibaeñas	
4	Estadio Quisqueya	Santo Domingo	Dominican Republic	14,469	Leones del Escogido, Tigres del Licey	
5	Estadio Julián Javier	San Francisco de Macorís	Dominican Republic	12,000	Gigantes del Cibao	
6	Estadio Francisco Micheli	La Romana	Dominican Republic	10,000	Toros del Este	
7	Estadio Tetelo Vargas	San Pedro de Macorís	Dominican Republic	8,000	Estrellas Orientales	
8	Estadio Cibao FC	Santiago de los Caballeros	Dominican Republic	8,000	Cibao Futbol Club, SEDOFUTBOL (select games)	

== See also ==
- Lists of stadiums
