= Ron Wotus =

American baseball player and coach (born 1961)

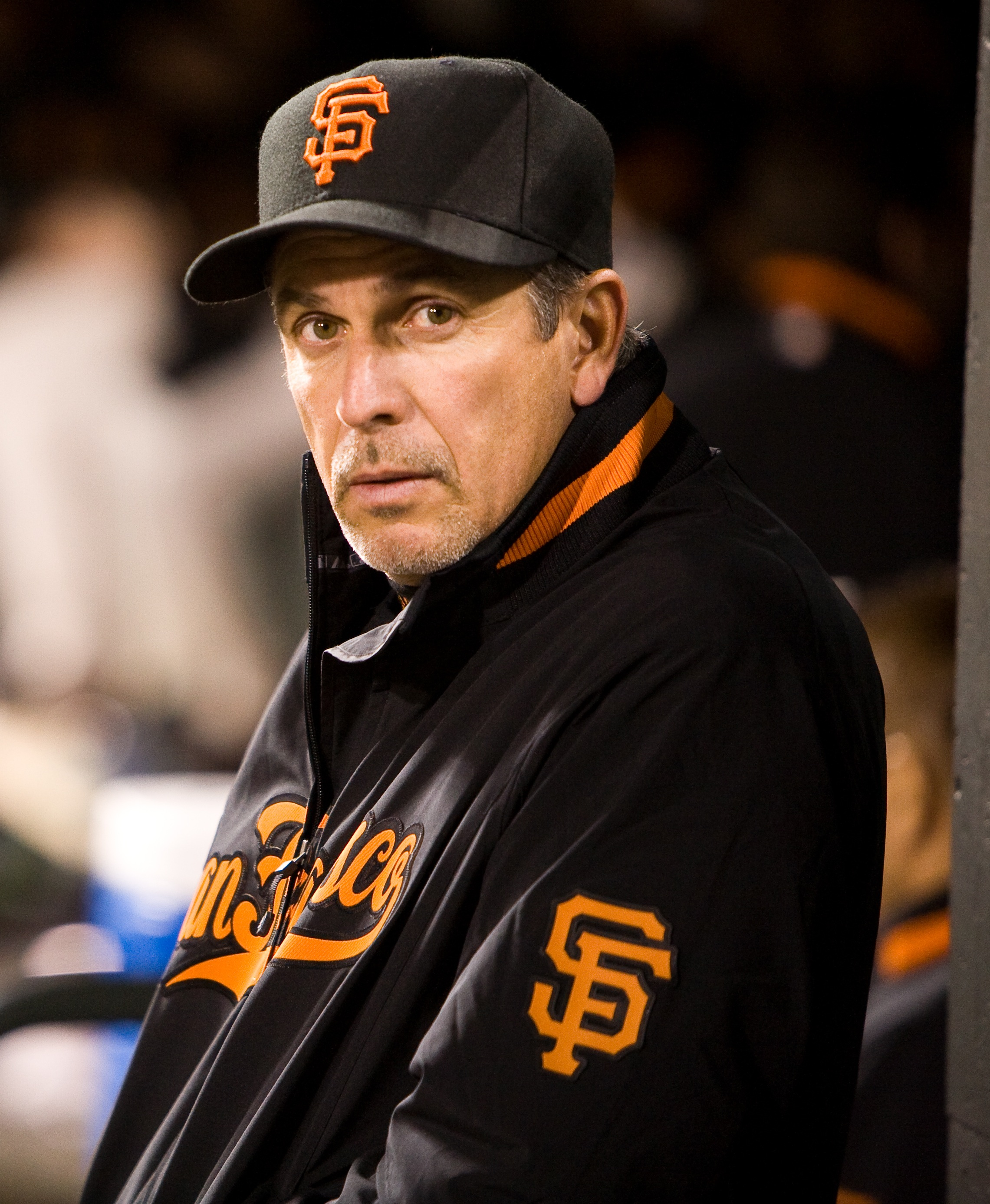
- Wotus with the San Francisco Giants
- Shortstop / Second baseman / Coach
- Born: March 3, 1961 (age 65); Hartford, Connecticut, U.S.
- Batted: Right Threw: Right

MLB debut
- September 3, 1983, for the Pittsburgh Pirates

Last MLB appearance
- September 30, 1984, for the Pittsburgh Pirates

MLB statistics
- Batting average: .207
- Home runs: 0
- Runs batted in: 2
- Stats at Baseball Reference

Teams
- As player: Pittsburgh Pirates (1983–1984); As coach: San Francisco Giants (1998–2021, 2026)

Career highlights and awards
- 3× World Series champion (2010, 2012, 2014)

Ronald Allan Wotus (born March 3, 1961) is an American former professional baseball player and coach who is the interim third base coach for the San Francisco Giants of Major League Baseball (MLB). He played professionally as a shortstop and second baseman for the Pittsburgh Pirates. He was drafted in the 16th round of the 1979 Major League Baseball draft by the Pirates, and made his MLB debut in 1983. He also served as bench coach for the Giants from 1999–2017.

== Early life ==
Wotus grew up in Colchester, Connecticut, and attended Bacon Academy, where he played soccer, basketball, and baseball.

== Playing career ==
Wotus was drafted in the 16th round of the 1979 MLB draft by the Pittsburgh Pirates.

He debuted with the Pirates in 1983 and also played for them in 1984. In the majors, he batted 12-for-58 (.207) in 32 games. He played in the Kansas City Royals organization in 1987 and the San Francisco Giants organization in 1988 and 1989, without returning to the majors.

== Coaching career ==
After retiring as a player, Wotus remained in the Giants organization as a minor league manager from 1991 to 1997. He managed the Single-A San Jose Giants (1991–92), the Double-A Shreveport Captains (1993–95), and Triple-A Phoenix Firebirds (1996–97). Wotus was named California League Manager of Year in 1991 after leading San Jose to a 92–44 record. In 1997, Wotus was named Pacific Coast League Manager of the Year after the Firebirds finished 88–55, winning 41 of their final 51 games.

Wotus became the Giants' third base coach in 1998 under manager Dusty Baker, and served as bench coach from 1999–2017 under managers Baker, Felipe Alou, and Bruce Bochy. Wotus said he hoped to manage some day, and interviewed for several major league manager jobs, including the Pirates in 2000, Los Angeles Dodgers in 2005, Seattle Mariners in 2013, Tampa Bay Rays in 2014, and Washington Nationals in 2015. Wotus also coached the Giants' infielders and was in charge of defensive shifts. After the Giants had a disappointing 2017 season, Wotus was reassigned to third base coach, his original coaching position with the Giants, to help stabilize the team.

On August 10, 2021, Wotus became the second coach in franchise history, following John McGraw, to reach 2,000 wins. On August 31, Wotus announced that he would be retiring from full-time coaching following the season.

On January 26, 2022, Wotus came out of retirement and was hired by the Giants to serve as a special assistant. He served as bench coach for Italy in the 2026 World Baseball Classic.

On May 29, 2026, Wotus rejoined the Giants as an interim third base coach, replacing previous coach Héctor Borg who was reassigned to a player development coach.

== Personal life ==
Wotus married his wife in 1987. They reside in Pleasant Hill, California.
