= Héctor Borg =

Dominican baseball coach (born 1985)

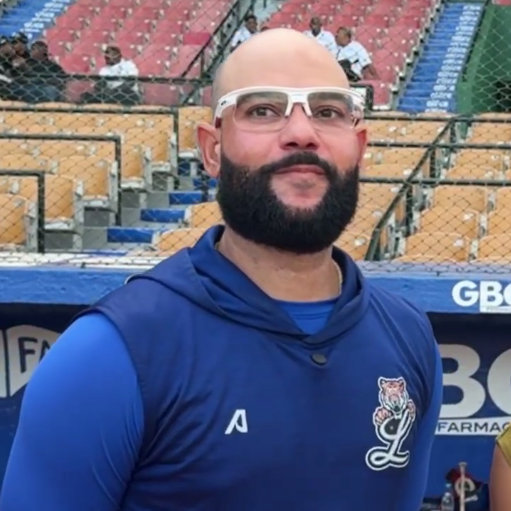
- Borg with the Tigres del Licey in 2025

San Francisco Giants – No. 80
- Coach
- Born: May 26, 1985 (age 41); San Pedro de Macorís, Dominican Republic
- Stats at Baseball Reference

Teams
- As coach: San Francisco Giants (2026–present)

Héctor Borg Polanco (born May 26, 1985) is a Dominican baseball coach and former player who is currently a player development coach for the San Francisco Giants of Major League Baseball (MLB). He previously served as the third base coach of the Giants.

== Coaching career ==
Borg signed with the San Francisco Giants as an international free agent in 2004 and played four seasons of minor league baseball before transitioning to coaching in 2008, remaining with the Giants as a coach in the Dominican Summer League. He also served as a manager for the Giants' Arizona Complex League team in 2017 and the Giants' Low-A affiliate, the Salem–Keizer Volcanoes, in 2018. Prior to his hiring to the Giants' major league staff in 2026, Borg had also served as the Giants' coordinator for Latin American development and the complex coordinator for minor league players in Arizona.

Borg also served as the third base coach for Toros del Este in the Dominican Professional Baseball League (LIDOM), as well as the bench coach for Tigres del Licey. He was named manager for the Estrellas Orientales for their 2026–27 season in LIDOM.

Borg was named the third base coach for the Giants under manager Tony Vitello prior to the start of the 2026 season. On May 29, 2026, Borg was reassigned to player development after a series of questionable call sending runners home resulting in outs. He was replaced on an interim basis by former 3rd base coach/bench coach Ron Wotus.

== International career ==
Borg managed the Dominican Republic national baseball team in the 2020 Summer Olympics in Tokyo, where the team won the bronze medal.
