= Universidad del Caribe (RD) =

University in Dominican Republic

The Universidad del Caribe (UNICARIBE) is a university in Santo Domingo in the Dominican Republic.

== History ==
The Universidad del Caribe (UNICARIBE) is a distance and inclusive institution founded in 1995 that uses an educational model integrated with information and communication technology in teaching and learning.

== Schools ==
- Business School
- School of Technology
- School of Humanities
- School of Legal and Political Sciences
