= Víctor Estévez =

Dominican baseball player and manager (born 1988)

Washington Nationals – No. 7
- Infielder / Third base coach
- Born: September 8, 1988 (age 38); Santo Domingo, Dominican Republic
- Bats: Right Throws: Right

Teams
- As coach: Washington Nationals (2026–present)

Víctor Estévez (born September 8, 1988) is a Dominican professional baseball coach for the Washington Nationals of Major League Baseball (MLB). He has previously worked as a minor league coach and manager in the Milwaukee Brewers organization and played minor league baseball from 2007 to 2010 with the Arizona Diamondbacks organization. He has also been a coach and manager in the Colombian Professional Baseball League and the Dominican Professional Baseball League.

== Playing career ==
Estévez signed with the Arizona Diamondbacks as an international free agent out of the Dominican Republic and made his professional baseball debut at age 19 with the Missoula Osprey, in 2007. He reached the High-A level with the Visalia Rawhide of the California League in 2010, before the Diamondbacks released him. In his minor league playing career, across four levels, he hit .233 with six home runs.

== Coaching career ==
=== Milwaukee Brewers ===
The Milwaukee Brewers hired Estévez as an infield coach for the Dominican Summer League Brewers ahead of the 2013 season. After three seasons on the DSL Brewers coaching staff, Estévez was promoted to manager in 2016. He was promoted from the Brewers' DSL manager to manager of the Single-A Carolina Mudcats in 2022, then to the High-A Wisconsin Timber Rattlers in 2024. He was named Carolina League Manager of the Year in 2023 and Midwest League Manager of the Year in 2024.

=== Winter leagues ===
Estévez served as first base coach for the Leones del Escogido in the Dominican Professional Baseball League in 2020–21. He did not coach in the Dominican League the following winter, instead managing the Vaqueros de Montería in the Colombian Professional Baseball League. He returned to the Dominican League in 2022–23 as a quality control coach for Águilas Cibaeñas, then back to Escogido as manager for the 2023–24 season. After serving as bench coach for Gigantes del Cibao in 2024-25, he was hired as manager of Toros del Este for the 2025–26 season.

=== Washington Nationals ===
The Washington Nationals, under first-year coach Blake Butera, hired Estévez as their third base/infield coach ahead of the 2026 season. The hiring was announced December 8, 2025.

== Personal life ==
Estévez holds a bachelor's degree in business administration from the Universidad del Caribe.
