= Estadio Tetelo Vargas =

Stadium in San Pedro de Macorís, Dominican Republic

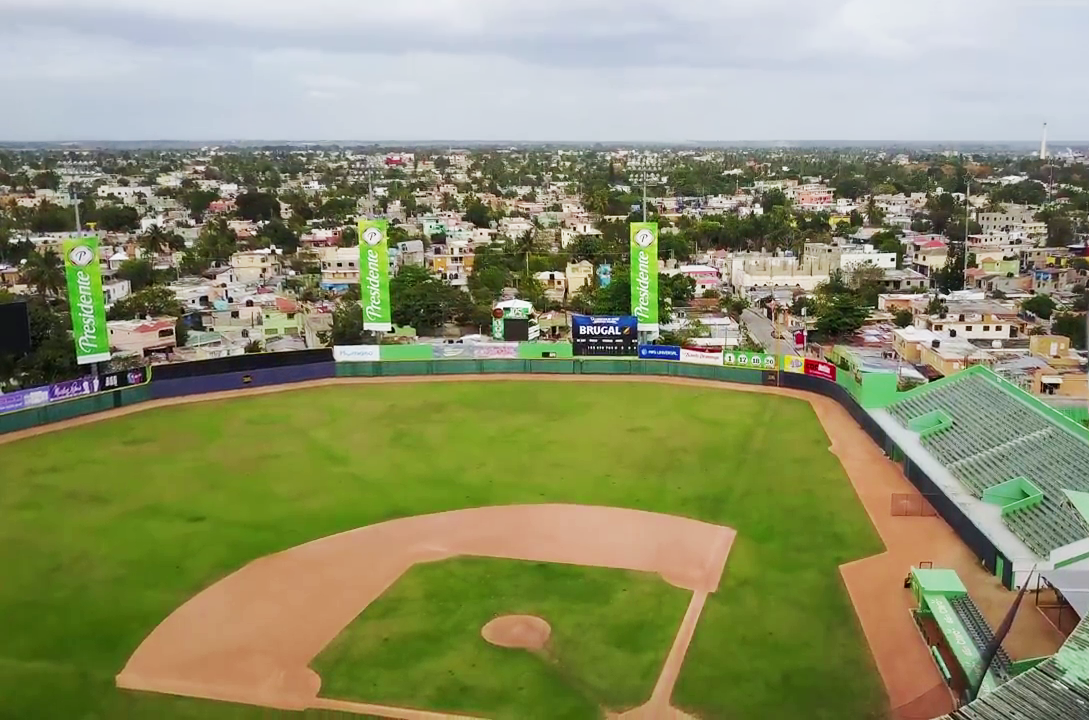
- Interactive map of Estadio Tetelo Vargas
- Location: Av. Circunvalación, San Pedro de Macorís, Dominican Republic.
- Coordinates: 18°27′51″N 69°18′12″W
- Capacity: 8,000
- Field size: Left Field – 335 feet (102 m); Left Center Field – 365 feet (111 m); Center Field – 385 feet (117 m); Right Center Field – 365 feet (111 m); Right Field – 335 feet (102 m)

Construction
- Opened: 25 November 1959
- Renovated: 22 October 2024
- Architect: Bienvenido Martínez Brea "Bebecito"

Tenant
- Estrellas Orientales

Estadio Tetelo Vargas is a multi-use stadium in San Pedro de Macorís, Dominican Republic. It is currently used mostly for baseball matches and hosts the home games of Estrellas Orientales. The stadium was built in 1959 and seats 8,000 people.

Estrellas Orientales temporarily played in the Estadio Francisco Micheli during the 1979–80 season after the stadium sustained damage from Hurricane David.
