= Estadio Julian Javier =

Estadio Julián Javier
- "El establo de la muerte"; "La casa del Terror"
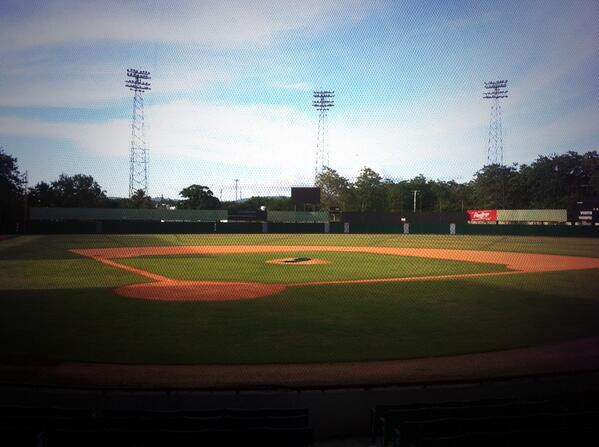
- Estadio Julian Javier in September 2013
- Interactive map of Estadio Julián Javier
- Address: Av Manolo Tavarez, San Francisco de Macorís 31000, Dominican Republic
- Coordinates: 19.282427°N 70.244652°W
- Operator: LIDOM
- Capacity: 12,000
- Field size: Left Field – 330 feet (101 m); Left Center Field – 355 feet (108 m); Center Field – 385 feet (117 m); Right Center Field – 350 feet (107 m); Right Field – 330 feet (101 m)

Construction
- Opened: 4 October 1975
- Renovated: 2010

Tenant
- Gigantes del Cibao

Estadio Julian Javier is a multi-use stadium in San Francisco de Macorís, Dominican Republic. It is currently used mostly for baseball games and hosts the home games of Gigantes del Cibao and Atlético San Francisco of the Dominican football league (LDF). The stadium holds 12,000 people.
