= Estrellas Orientales =

Professional baseball team in San Pedro de Macorís, Dominican Republic

- Cap insignia

Information
- League: Dominican Professional Baseball League
- Location: San Pedro de Macorís, Dominican Republic
- Ballpark: Estadio Tetelo Vargas (1959–present)
- Established: 15 December 1910; 115 years ago
- League championships: 3: 1954; 1968; 2019
- Colors: Green, white, black
- Mascot: El Gamo
- Retired numbers: 1; 4; 18; 20; 24; 34
- General manager: Angel Ovalles
- Manager: Héctor Borg

Current uniforms
Home	Away	Third

Estrellas Orientales (EO; English: Eastern Stars), also known as Estrellas de Oriente, is a professional baseball team in the Dominican Professional Baseball League (LIDOM). Based in San Pedro de Macorís, the team has historically struggled, winning championships only in 1936, 1954, 1968 and 2019.

== History ==
The team was established on 15 December 1910, with the idea of competing against Tigres del Licey, that dominated the Dominican League during those years. Estrellas Orientales won their first title in 1936 defeating Santiago Baseball Club, Tigres del Licey and Leones del Escogido. The team won the championship for the second time in 1954 and again in 1968.

In 2019, after 51 years, Estrellas Orientales won their fourth title after defeating Toros del Este in the championship series.

== Roster ==
Estrellas Orientales roster – 2024–25 Dominican Professional Baseball League
Players		Coaches
Pitchers: -- (Dominican Republic) Elvis Alvarado; 36 (Dominican Republic) Carlos Belen; 30 (Dominican Republic) Neftalí Feliz; -- (Dominican Republic) Julián Fernández; 97 (Dominican Republic) Geronimo Franzua; 84 (United States) Tom Hackimer; 31 (Dominican Republic) Luis Moreno; -- (Panama) Andy Otero; 82 (Dominican Republic) Robinson Piña; 61 (Dominican Republic) Raffi Vizcaíno; -- (Dominican Republic) Jefry Yan	Catchers: 66 (United States) Christian Cerda; -- (Colombia) Carlos Mario Martínez; Infielders: -- (Dominican Republic) Euribiel Angeles; 7 (Dominican Republic) Moisés Castillo; 37 (Dominican Republic) Rainer Nunez; 56 (Dominican Republic) Miguel Sanó; 97 (United States) Frank Schwindel; -- (Dominican Republic) Enmanuel Valdez; Outfielders: 81 (Dominican Republic) Abraham Almonte; 6 (Honduras) Ismael Munguia; 4 (Dominican Republic) Junior Perez; 34 (Dominican Republic) Magneuris Sierra; 15 (Dominican Republic) Raimel Tapia	Manager: (Dominican Republic) Fernando Tatís

== Retired numbers ==
No.	Name	Pos.	Year
1	Tetelo Vargas	OF	1936
4	Alfredo Griffin	SS	1976
5	Rico Carty	LF	1963
10	Ralph Garr	OF	1968
12	Manuel Castillo	3B	1980
16	Rafael Ramírez	SS	1980
17	Silvano Quezada	P	1967
18	Rafael Batista	1B	1973
20	Rico Carty	LF	1970
24	Julian heredia	P	2005
34	Félix José	RF	2005
38	Pepe Frías	SS	1979
123	José Oliva	3B	1994

== Trivia ==
The Estrellas Orientales franchise is considered the equivalent of the Chicago Cubs among Dominican Teams because of their championship drought which lasted from 1968 until 2019.
