= Estadio Cibao =

Multi-use stadium in Santiago, Dominican Republic

- El Valle de la Muerte (The Death Valley)
- Aerial view of Estadio Cibao in 2025
- Interactive map of Estadio Cibao
- Former names: Estadio Leónidas Radhamés
- Location: Calle Benito González, Ensanche Simón Bolívar, Santiago, Santiago Province, Dominican Republic
- Coordinates: 19°28′1″N 70°42′32″W
- Owner: Dominican state
- Operator: Dominican Professional Baseball League (LIDOM); Águilas Cibaeñas (operational management)
- Capacity: 18,077
- Surface: Grass
- Field size: Left field: 335 feet (102 m); Left-center: 365 feet (111 m); Center field: 385 feet (117 m); Right-center: 365 feet (111 m); Right field: 335 feet (102 m)

Construction
- Opened: October 25, 1958
- Architect: Bienvenido Martínez Brea "Bebecito"

Tenant
- Águilas Cibaeñas (LIDOM)

Estadio Cibao (English: Cibao Stadium) is a multi-use stadium in Santiago, Dominican Republic. Currently, it is mostly used for baseball games and hosts the home games of the Águilas Cibaeñas in the Dominican Winter Baseball League. The stadium opened on October 25, 1958 and was constructed by the engineer Bienvenido Martinez Brea. Estadio Cibao seats 18,077 spectators, making it the largest baseball stadium in the Dominican Republic. Its field dimensions are 335 feet at the foul poles, 365 feet to the power alleys, and 385 feet at center field.

== Estadio Cibao renovation ==
In 2007 former president Leonel Fernández initiated a renovation project of the stadium in time to host the 2008 Caribbean Series. The project included extending the visitors club house, remodeling the main entrance, construction of a multi-use stage behind center field and construction of both a new batting cage and a bull pen. The renovation, priced at $110,320,921RD (~ $3,065,000USD), was a part of a larger public works project that totaled $5,750,000,000RD pesos.

In 2008, Estadio Cibao exclusively hosted the Caribbean Series for the first time. Yet, this was the second time in the Dominican Republic that series was played outside Estadio Quisqueya (the first was in 1976, when the venues were split).
