= Toros del Este =

Professional baseball team in La Romana, Dominican Republic

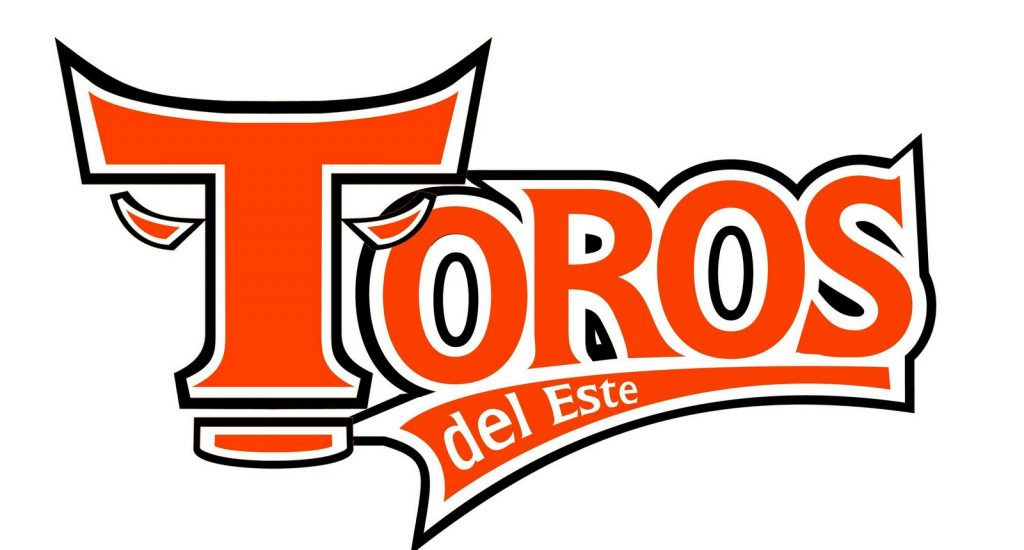
Logo
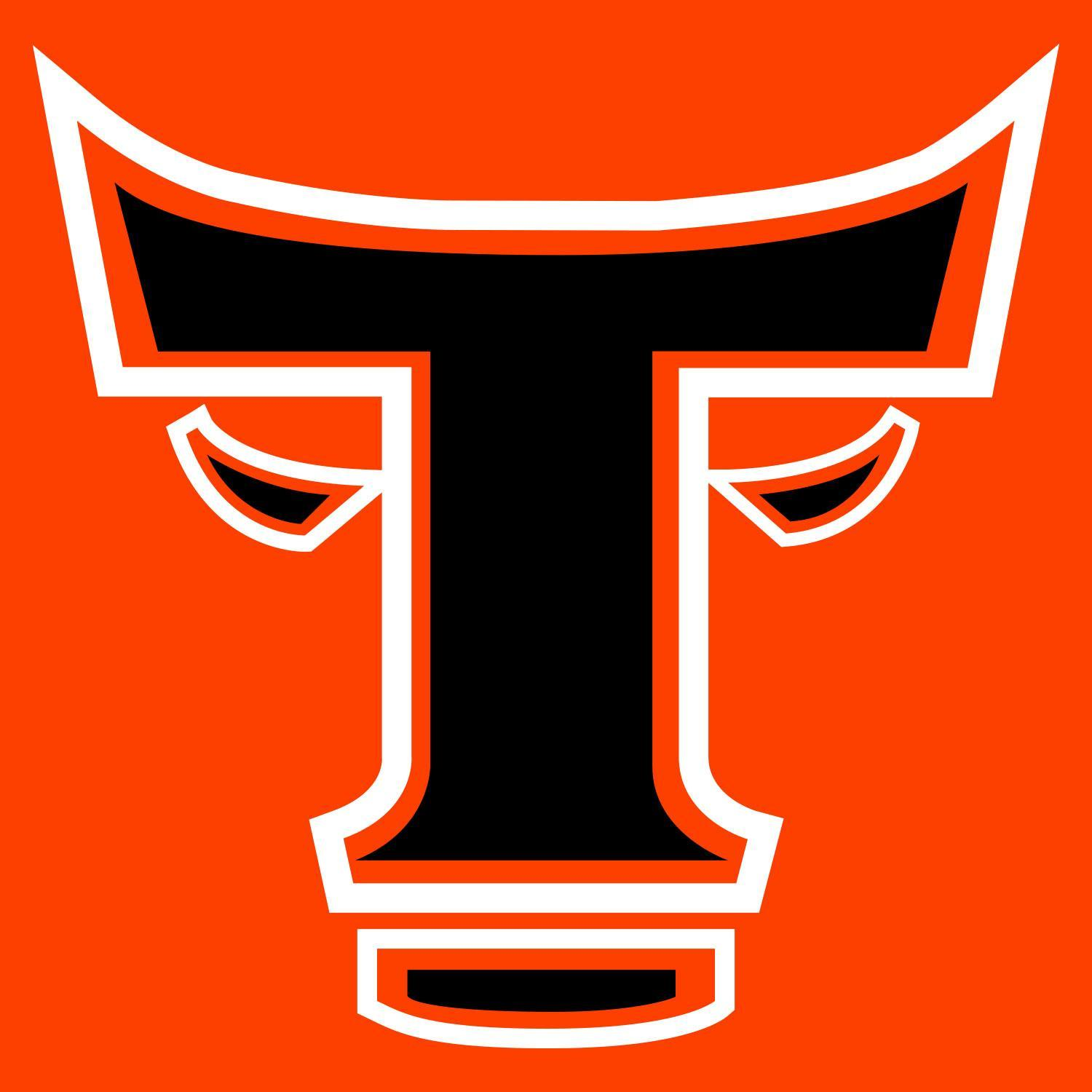
Cap insignia

Information
- League: Dominican Professional Baseball League
- Location: La Romana, Dominican Republic
- Ballpark: Estadio Francisco Micheli (1983–present)
- Founded: 12 August 1983; 43 years ago
- Caribbean Series championships: 1: 2020
- League championships: 3: 1995; 2011; 2020
- Former name: Azucareros del Este (1983–2008)
- Colors: Orange, White, Black
- President: Luis Emilio Rodríguez
- General manager: Jesus Mejia Armenteros
- Manager: Víctor Estévez

Toros del Este (TE; formerly Azucareros del Este) are a professional baseball based in La Romana, Dominican Republic. The team competes in the Dominican Professional Baseball League (LIDOM) and was established in 1983 as part of the league’s eastern expansion.

The franchise has won three national championships and one Caribbean Series title, consolidating its status as one of the most successful teams from the eastern region of the Dominican Republic.

== History ==
=== Foundation ===
Following the inauguration of Estadio Francisco Micheli in 1979, local sports authorities and league officials proposed the creation of a professional baseball team to represent the city of La Romana. In 1983, the franchise was established under the name Azucareros Béisbol Club, later renamed Azucareros del Este, reflecting the region’s historical ties to the sugar industry.

The team eventually adopted the name Toros del Este, a rebranding that emphasized a broader regional identity while retaining its eastern Dominican roots.

=== Early seasons and first championship ===
During the 1980s and early 1990s, the Toros reached postseason play multiple times, including appearances in the finals during the 1984–85 and 1992–93 seasons, where they were defeated by the Tigres del Licey and the Águilas Cibaeñas, respectively.

The franchise captured its first national championship in the 1994–95 season after defeating the Águilas Cibaeñas in the league finals.

=== 2010–11 championship ===
The Toros won their second championship during the 2010–11 season, sweeping the Estrellas Orientales in a five-game final series. The matchup became known locally as the “Sugarcane Series” due to both teams representing the eastern region of the Dominican Republic.

This final was also notable for being the first in league history to exclude any of the traditional “Big Three” teams: Tigres del Licey, Águilas Cibaeñas, and Leones del Escogido.

=== 2019–20 championship and Caribbean Series title ===
On January 28, 2020, the Toros del Este secured their third league championship by defeating the Tigres del Licey in an eight-game final series. The decisive game was played at Estadio Quisqueya in Santo Domingo.

The championship qualified the team for the 2020 Caribbean Series, where the Toros won their first Caribbean Series title, marking a historic milestone for the franchise.

== Retired numbers ==
The Toros del Este have retired several uniform numbers in honor of players who made significant contributions to the franchise, including Esteban Germán, Domingo Ramos, Eddy Garabito, Andújar Cedeño, Domingo Cedeño, and Julián Yan.

== See also ==
- Caribbean Series
- Dominican Professional Baseball League
