= Estadio Francisco Micheli =

Baseball stadium in La Romana, Dominican Republic

Estadio Francisco A. Micheli
- Aerial view of the stadium in 2025
- Interactive map of Estadio Francisco A. Micheli
- Former names: Romana
- Location: La Romana, Dominican Republic
- Coordinates: 18.434237°N 68.988858°W
- Owner: Central Romana Corporation
- Capacity: 8,838
- Surface: Grass
- Field size: Left Field - 330 ft Left-Center - 370 ft Center Field - 390 ft Right-Center - 370 ft Right Field - 330 ft

Construction
- Opened: November 19, 1979

Tenant
- Toros del Este (LIDOM)

Estadio Francisco A. Micheli (formerly known as Romana, in reference to the city where it is located) is a private multipurpose stadium dedicated mainly to the sport of baseball. Located in the city of La Romana, with a capacity for about 10,000 people, is the home of the Dominican professional team Toros del Este. The stadium was inaugurated in 1979 by President Antonio Guzmán Fernández and is owned by the Central Romana Corporation. In 1998 the stadium suffered damage as a result of Hurricane Georges, which went through much of the Dominican Republic during that year.
