= 2014 Caribbean Series =

Latin American baseball tournament

The fifty-sixth edition of the Caribbean Series (Serie del Caribe) was played in 2014. It was held from February 1 through February 8 of 2014 with the champion baseball teams of Cuba, Naranjas de Villa Clara; Dominican Republic, Tigres del Licey; Mexico, Naranjeros de Hermosillo; Puerto Rico, Indios de Mayagüez, and Venezuela, Navegantes del Magallanes. The games were played at Estadio Nueva Esparta in Margarita Island, Porlamar, Venezuela. Unlike previous Series, the five teams competed through a ten-game round robin schedule, each team facing the other teams once, followed by a final four playoff round. This was the first time since 1960 that a Cuban team took part.

== Round robin ==
=== Schedule ===
Time zone VET (UTC–4½)

Date	Time	Away	Result	Home	Stadium
February 1	15:00	Indios de Mayagüez	7–6	Tigres del Licey	Nueva Esparta
February 1	21:00	Naranjas de Villa Clara	4–9	Naranjeros de Hermosillo	Nueva Esparta
February 2	15:00	Naranjeros de Hermosillo	6–3	Indios de Mayagüez	Nueva Esparta
February 2	21:00	Naranjas de Villa Clara	5–8	Navegantes del Magallanes	Nueva Esparta
February 3	15:30	Tigres del Licey	9–2	Naranjas de Villa Clara	Nueva Esparta
February 3	20:00	Navegantes del Magallanes	6–3	Naranjeros de Hermosillo	Nueva Esparta
February 4	15:30	Indios de Mayagüez	1–2	Naranjas de Villa Clara	Nueva Esparta
February 4	20:00	Tigres del Licey	1–2	Navegantes del Magallanes	Nueva Esparta
February 5	15:30	Naranjeros de Hermosillo	6–7	Tigres del Licey	Nueva Esparta
February 5	20:00	Navegantes del Magallanes	4–5	Indios de Mayagüez	Nueva Esparta

=== Standings ===
Pos	Team	G	W	L	PCT	DIF	H–H	TQB
1	Navegantes del Magallanes	4	3	1	.750			
2	Naranjeros de Hermosillo	4	2	2	.500	1	1-1	0.0784
3	Tigres del Licey	4	2	2	.500	1	1-1	0.0380
4	Indios de Mayagüez	4	2	2	.500	1	1-1	-0.1053
5	Naranjas de Villa Clara	4	1	3	.250	2		

=== Linescores ===
==== Game 1, February 1 ====
Team	1	2	3	4	5	6	7	8	9	10	R	H	E
Puerto Rico	1	0	0	0	4	1	0	0	0	1	7	10	1
Dominican Republic	2	1	2	1	0	0	0	0	0	0	6	9	1
WP: Saúl Rivera (1-0) LP: Guillermo Mota (0-1) Sv: Tyler Herron (1); Home runs: PUR: Irving Falú (1); DOM: Juan Pérez (1). Héctor Gómez (1); Boxscore

==== Game 2, February 1 ====
Team	1	2	3	4	5	6	7	8	9	R	H	E
Cuba	0	1	0	0	2	0	0	0	1	4	7	2
Mexico	2	0	0	2	5	0	0	0	x	9	15	1
WP: Alfredo Aceves (1-0) LP: Freddy Álvarez (0-1); Home runs: CUB: Alfredo Despaigne (1), Yuniet Flores (1); MEX: Chris Roberson (1); Boxscore

==== Game 3, February 2 ====
Team	1	2	3	4	5	6	7	8	9	R	H	E
Mexico	0	0	0	0	4	0	0	0	2	6	11	1
Puerto Rico	0	0	0	0	0	0	0	0	3	3	7	2
WP: Juan Delgadillo (1-0) LP: Jonathan Albaladejo (0-1); Home runs: MEX: Zelous Wheeler 2 (2); PUR: None; Notes: Delgadillo allowed three hits in seven shutout innings. Puerto Rico used five consecutive pinch hitters in the 9th to set an inning record in the Series. Boxscore

==== Game 4, February 2 ====
Team	1	2	3	4	5	6	7	8	9	R	H	E
Cuba	0	1	0	0	4	0	0	0	0	5	11	2
Venezuela	0	1	3	2	0	0	0	2	x	8	12	0
WP: Daryl Thompson (1-0) LP: Norge Ruiz (0-1) Sv: Jean Machí (1); Home runs: CUB: None; VEN: Endy Chávez (1); Boxscore

==== Game 5, February 3 ====
Team	1	2	3	4	5	6	7	8	9	R	H	E
Dominican Republic	1	2	1	2	0	0	0	3	0	9	12	1
Cuba	0	0	0	0	0	0	0	0	0	2	5	2
WP: Jon Leicester (1-0) LP: Yasmany Hernández (0-1); Home runs: DOM: Julio Lugo (1); CUB: None; Notes: Leicester allowed three hits in seven shutout innings. Boxscore

==== Game 6, February 3 ====
Team	1	2	3	4	5	6	7	8	9	R	H	E
Venezuela	1	3	0	0	0	0	0	2	0	6	9	2
Mexico	0	0	0	2	0	1	0	0	0	3	5	1
WP: Carlos Zambrano (1-0) LP: Nathan Reed (0-1) Sv: Jean Machi (2); Home runs: VEN: Ramón Hernández (1); MEX: None; Boxscore

==== Game 7, February 4 ====
Team	1	2	3	4	5	6	7	8	9	R	H	E
Puerto Rico	1	0	0	0	0	0	0	0	0	1	2	3
Cuba	1	0	0	0	0	0	1	0	x	2	8	0
WP: Vicyohandrys Odelin (1-0) LP: Joel Piñeiro (0-1); Home runs: PUR: Eddie Rosario (1); CUB: None; Notes: Odelin pitched a complete game. Both runs allowed by Piñeiro were unearned. Boxscore

==== Game 8, February 4 ====
Team	1	2	3	4	5	6	7	8	9	R	H	E
Dominican Republic	0	0	0	0	0	0	0	0	1	1	4	0
Venezuela	1	0	0	0	0	0	0	1	x	2	4	1
WP: Elvis Araújo (1-0) LP: Fabio Castro (0-1) Sv: Jean Machi (3); Boxscore

==== Game 9, February 5 ====
Team	1	2	3	4	5	6	7	8	9	R	H	E
Mexico	0	0	0	0	0	0	3	3	0	6	9	0
Dominican Republic	0	1	4	0	0	1	1	0	x	7	12	2
WP: Claudio Vargas (1-0) LP: Salvador Robles (0-1) Sv: Carlos Mármol (1); Home runs: MEX: Sebastián Valle (1), Zelous Wheeler (3); DOM: Eugenio Vélez 2 (2); Notes: Vargas pitched six scoreless innings. Boxscore

==== Game 10, February 5 ====
Team	1	2	3	4	5	6	7	8	9	R	H	E
Venezuela	0	0	0	1	0	0	3	0	0	4	8	0
Puerto Rico	1	0	0	3	1	0	0	0	x	5	9	1
WP: Michael Nix (1-0) LP: Carlos Monasterios (0-1) Sv: Tyler Herron (2); Home runs: VEN: Alberto Callaspo (1); PUR: Osvaldo Martínez (1); Boxscore

== Playoff round ==
=== Bracket ===
Semifinals
3	Tigres del Licey	2
2	Naranjeros de Hermosillo	3
4	Indios de Mayagüez	2
1	Navegantes del Magallanes	0

Finals
2	Naranjeros de Hermosillo	7
4	Indios de Mayagüez	1

=== Semifinals ===
Date	Time	Away	Results	Home	Stadium
February 6	20:00	Tigres del Licey	2–3	Naranjeros de Hermosillo	Nueva Esparta
February 7	20:00	Indios de Mayagüez	2–0	Navegantes del Magallanes	Nueva Esparta

=== Championship game ===
Date	Time	Away	Results	Home	Stadium
February 8	20:00	Indios de Mayagüez	1–7	Naranjeros de Hermosillo	Nueva Esparta

=== Linescores ===
==== Game 11, February 6 ====
Team	1	2	3	4	5	6	7	8	9	R	H	E
Dominican Republic	1	0	0	0	0	0	1	0	0	2	4	0
Mexico	1	0	0	0	0	0	0	1	1	3	6	1
WP: Oliver Pérez (1-0) LP: Guillermo Mota (0-2); Boxscore

==== Game 12, February 7 ====
Team	1	2	3	4	5	6	7	8	9	R	H	E
Puerto Rico	0	0	0	0	0	0	0	2	0	2	3	0
Venezuela	0	0	0	0	0	0	0	0	0	0	3	1
WP: Steve Smith (1-0) LP: Hassan Pena (0-1) Sv: Tyler Herron (3); Notes: Giancarlo Alvarado (6 IP), Smith (2 IP) and Herron (1 IP) combined for the shutout. Boxscore

==== Game 13, February 8 ====
Team	1	2	3	4	5	6	7	8	9	R	H	E
Puerto Rico	0	0	0	0	0	0	0	0	1	1	5	0
Mexico	0	0	0	0	0	6	0	1	x	7	11	0
WP: Juan Delgadillo (2-0) LP: Kanekoa Texeira (0-1); Home runs: PUR: None; MEX: Chris Roberson (2), Sebastián Valle (1); Boxscore

== Individual leaders ==
Player	Statistic
Batting
Emilio Bonifacio (DOM); Ramón Lunar (CUB)	Batting average	.432
Chris Roberson (MEX)	Runs	6
Chris Roberson (MEX)	Hits	10
Yulieski Gurriel (CUB)	Doubles	3
Yordan Manduley (CUB); Chris Roberson (MEX); Jon Weber (MEX)	Triples	1
Zelous Wheeler (MEX)	Home runs	3
Sebastián Valle (MEX)	RBI	7
Ezequiel Carrera (VEN); Héctor Gómez (DOM); Yulieski Gurriel (CUB); Juan Pérez (DOM); Chris Roberson (MEX)	Stolen bases	2
Chris Roberson (MEX)	Total bases	19
Emilio Bonifacio (DOM)	OBP	.591
Sebastián Valle (MEX)	SLG	.733
Pitching
Juan Delgadillo (MEX)	Wins	2
Juan Delgadillo (MEX); Jon Leicester (DOM); Joel Piñeiro (PUR)	ERA	0.00
Alfredo Aceves (MEX); Juan Delgadillo (MEX)	Innings pitched	14.0
Tyler Herron (PUR); Jean Machi (VEN)	Saves	3
Logan Williamson (PUR)	Walks	6
Juan Delgadillo (MEX)	Strikeouts	9

== All-Star team ==
Name	Position
Sebastián Valle (MEX)	Catcher
Ramón Lunar (CUB)	First baseman
Alberto Callaspo (VEN)	Second baseman
Yunesky Sánchez (MEX)	Third baseman
Héctor Gómez (DOM)	Shortstop
Yuniet Flores (CUB)	Outfielder
Chris Roberson (MEX)	Outfielder
Jon Weber (MEX)	Outfielder
Ronny Paulino (DOM)	Designated hitter
Juan Delgadillo (MEX)	Right handed pitcher
Elvis Araújo (VEN)	Left handed pitcher
Tyler Herron (PUR)	Relief pitcher
Awards
Chris Roberson (MEX)	Most Valuable Player
Matías Carrillo (MEX)	Manager

== Sources ==
- Official Site
- MLB.com – 2014 Caribbean Series
