= Estadio Quisqueya Juan Marichal =

Baseball stadium in Santo Domingo, Dominican Republic

- El Quisqueya (The Quisqueya); El Coloso del Ensanche La Fe (The Colossus of Ensanche La Fe); El Juan Marichal (The Juan Marichal)
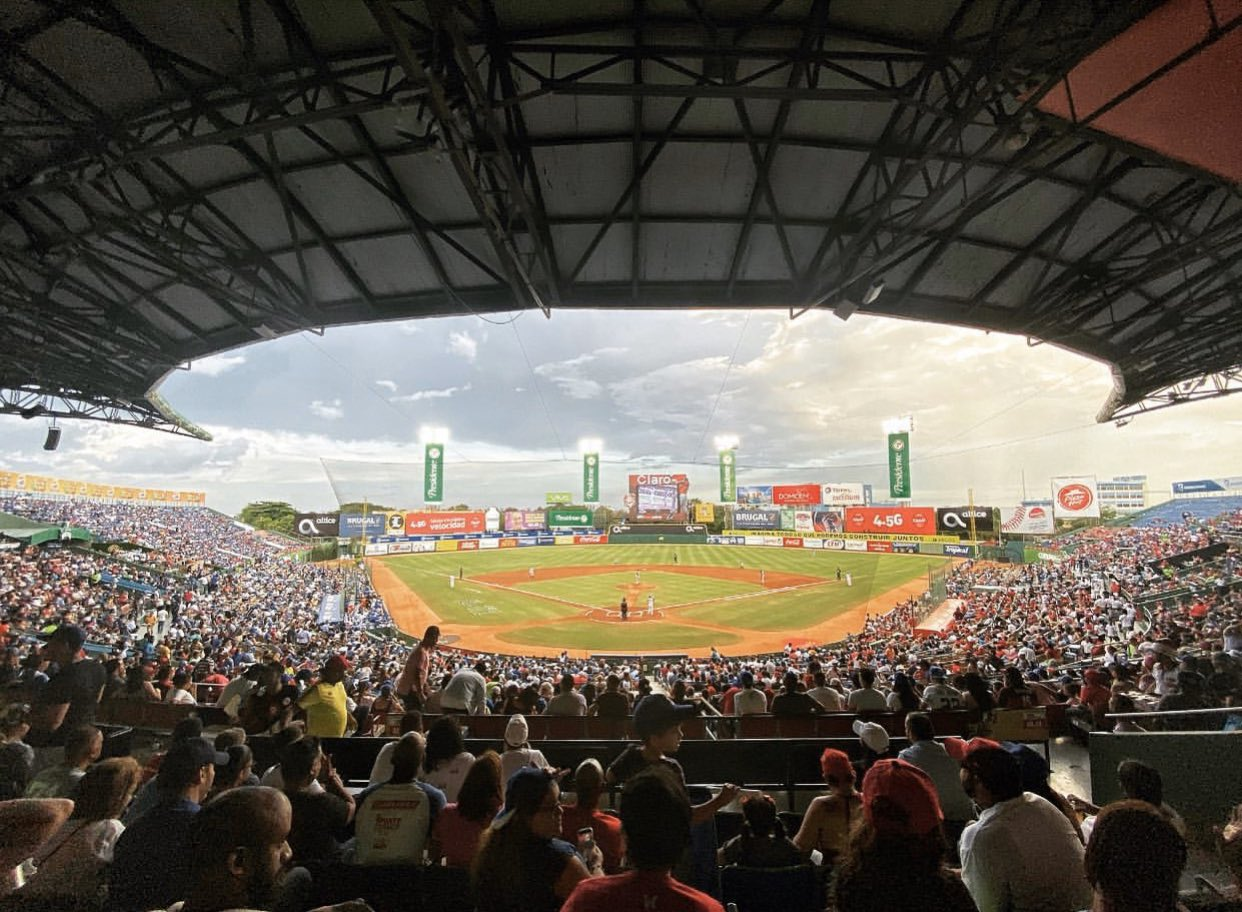
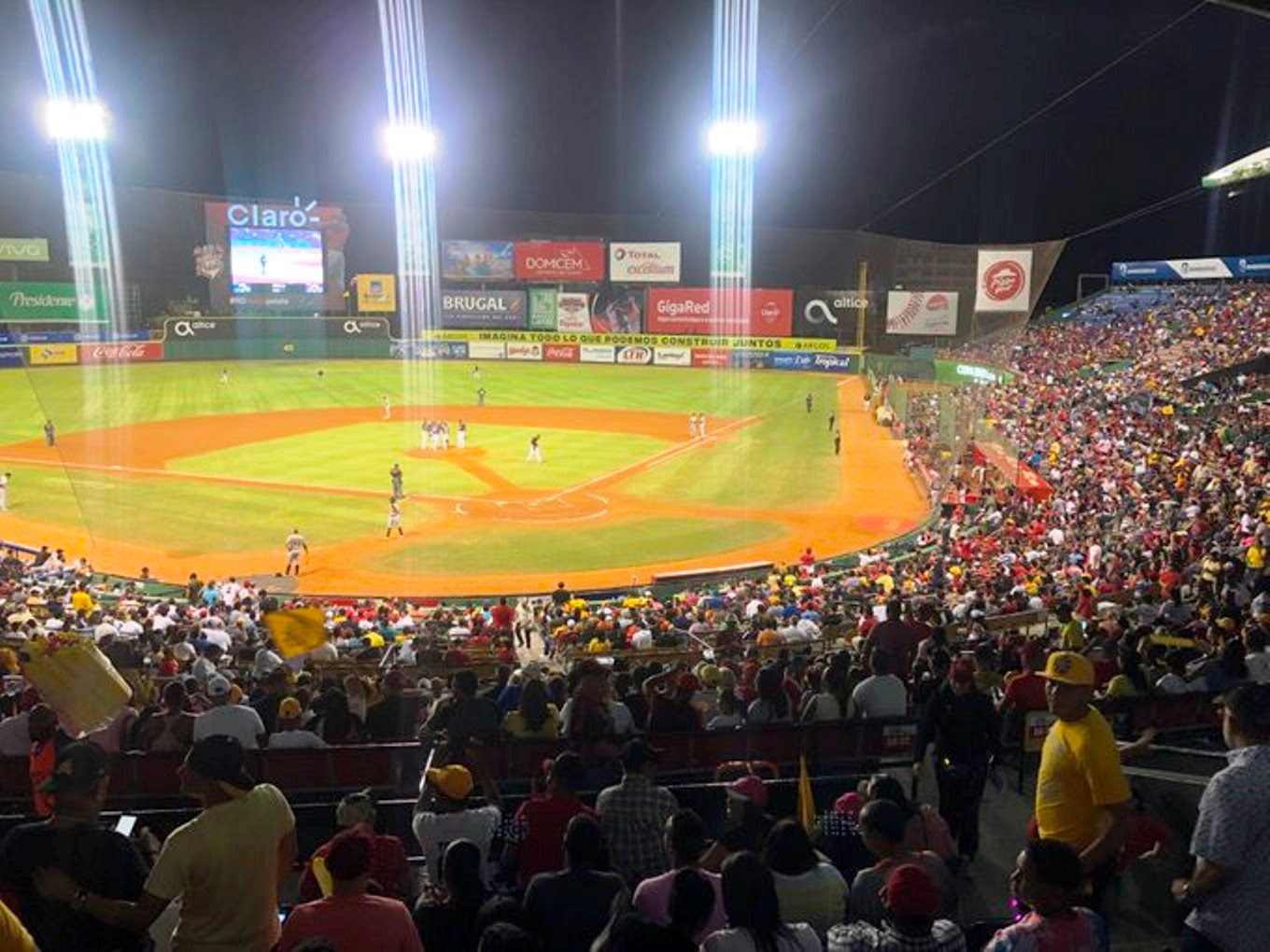
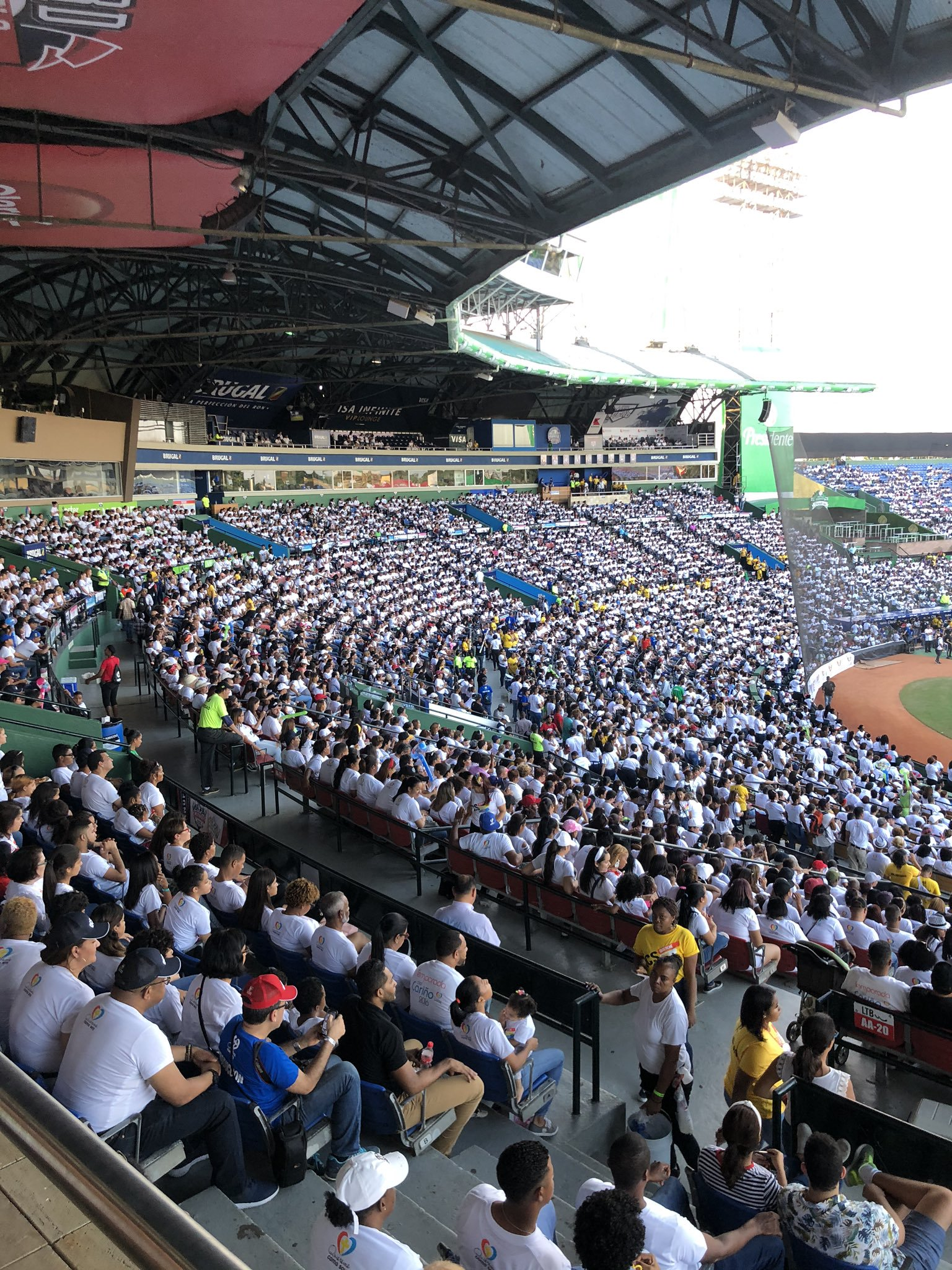
- Panoramic view of the stadium in 2019 Grandstand of the stadium, 2019
- Interactive map of Estadio Quisqueya Juan Marichal
- Full name: Estadio Quisqueya Juan Marichal
- Former names: Estadio Trujillo (1955–1961); Estadio Quisqueya (1961–2015)
- Address: Avenida Tiradentes, esquina Calle Euclides Morillo 3456
- Location: Ensanche La Fe, Santo Domingo, Distrito Nacional, 10514, Dominican Republic
- Coordinates: 18°29′17.38″N 69°55′35.11″W
- Owner: Dominican state
- Operator: Patronato del Estadio Quisqueya Juan Marichal (Note: English: Board of Trustees of Estadio Quisqueya Juan Marichal.)
- Seating type: General admission; reserved seating; VIP and corporate boxes
- Capacity: 13,186 (sports, 2007–present); 25,000 (2007); 25,000 (concerts)
- Surface: Natural grass
- Scoreboard: Digital (LED)
- Screen: 1
- Field size: Baseball: Left field: 335 feet (102 m); Left-center: 383 feet (117 m); Center field: 411 feet (125 m); Right-center: 383 feet (117 m); Right field: 335 feet (102 m)
- Acreage: 41,818 m² (450,075 square feet)
- Public transit: OMSA Bus: C4–C5 (John F. Kennedy); Public Bus: 8A, 11, 20B, 47, 54, 63, 64, 69B, 77, 100B, NACO
- Parking: Yes (paid)

Construction
- Opened: October 1955, 23; 71 years ago
- Renovated: 1979, 1990, 2007, 2010–2011, 2014–2015, 2022–2023, 2026
- Expanded: 2007, 2010–2011
- Cost: RD$3.5 million (≈ RD$320 billion in October 2024)
- Architects: Marr & Holman; Bienvenido Martínez Brea "Bebecito" (Note: The stadium was designed by the architectural firm Marr & Holman, with Bienvenido Martínez Brea "Bebecito" serving as the architect.)

Tenants
- Tigres del Licey (LIDOM) (1955–present); Leones del Escogido (LIDOM) (1955–present)

Estadio Quisqueya Juan Marichal (English: Quisqueya Stadium Juan Marichal), popularly known as Estadio Quisqueya (English: Quisqueya Stadium) (Note: Quisqueya is a term of Taíno origin originally used to refer to the island of Hispaniola. The word means "Mother of All Lands" and is a poetic and alternative name for the Dominican Republic.), is a baseball stadium in Santo Domingo, Dominican Republic. It is often used as a multi-purpose stadium. The seating capacity is 13,186 people. Its field dimensions are 335 feet (102 m) at the foul poles, 383 feet (117 m) at the power alleys, and 411 feet (125 m) at center field. Patronato del Estadio Quisqueya Juan Marichal (Note: English: Board of Trustees of Estadio Quisqueya Juan Marichal.) is in charge of its management. The area surrounding the stadium includes Coliseo de Boxeo Carlos "Teo" Cruz, the facilities of Liga Deportiva Mercedes, and the offices of Instituto Nacional de Tránsito y Transporte Terrestre (INTRANT).

It is one of two stadiums in the Caribbean region to host two different baseball teams, Tigres del Licey and Leones del Escogido, the other one being Hiram Bithorn Stadium in San Juan, Puerto Rico that hosts Cangrejeros de Santurce and Senadores de San Juan.

The stadium is also used for other sports and concerts. Football club Atlético Pantoja used the venue for their inaugural 2016 CFU Club Championship match. Artists who have held concerts at the stadium include Marc Anthony, Shakira, Ricky Martin, Enrique Iglesias, and Bad Bunny.

== History ==
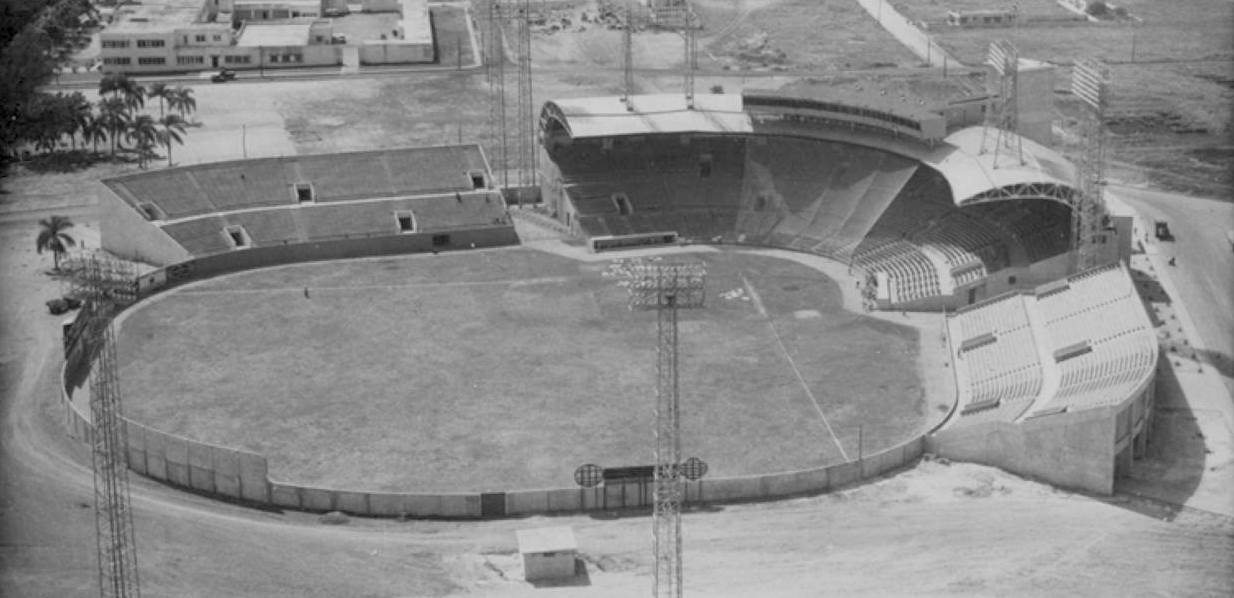
Aerial view of Estadio Quisqueya Juan Marichal (then known as Estadio Trujillo) in 1955

Statue of Juan Marichal

The stadium was built in 1955 as Estadio Trujillo (Note: also mentioned sometimes in chronicles of the time as "Estadio Presidente Trujillo".), during the Rafael Trujillo dictatorship, with the Bobby Maduro Miami Stadium serving as the basis for its design. The name Estadio Quisqueya was officially adopted in November 1961, during the presidency of Joaquín Balaguer, replacing the name Estadio Trujillo. In 2015, it was renamed in honor of former Major League Baseball (MLB) player and Baseball Hall of Fame inductee Juan Marichal, by the presidency of Danilo Medina.

The stadium began the modern era of organized Dominican baseball by introducing the lighting system to its circuit, which is why it is popularly said that it started the "era of games under lights" (Spanish: "era de los juegos bajo luces").

The stadium was inaugurated on October 23, 1955, with the first night game between Tigres del Licey and Estrellas Orientales.

The first baseball events to occur at the stadium were:

- First hit: Alcibíades Colón (Licey) against Donald Elston (Estrellas), October 23, 1955
- First double: Luis "Grillo" Báez (Licey), October 23, 1955
- First triple: Bob Wilson (Licey), October 23, 1955
- First home run: Emil Panko (Águilas), October 24, 1955
- First out: Pablo García (Licey), October 23, 1955
- First run batted in (RBI): Pablo García (Licey), October 23, 1955

The Caribbean Series (Spanish: Serie del Caribe) has been held at the stadium in: 1972, 1976, 1980, 1988, 1996, 2000, 2004, 2012, 2016 and 2022.

During spring training for the 2024 MLB season, two games between the Boston Red Sox and Tampa Bay Rays were scheduled for March 9–10 at the stadium as part of MLB World Tour (MLB games held outside of the United States and Canada). The Red Sox defeated the Rays in both games, by scores of 4–0 and 7–6.

While the stadium has never hosted the World Baseball Classic, it served as venue for two friendly games between the Dominican Republic national baseball team and the Detroit Tigers in preparation for the 2026 World Baseball Classic.

It served as venue for matches of Baseball at the 2026 Central American and Caribbean Games.

== Capacity ==
Seats location

| Sections | Quantity |
|---|---|
| Palcos A | 1,411 |
| Palcos AA | 1,242 |
| Preferencia B | 766 |
| Preferencia C | 2,767 |
| Bleachers | 7,000 |
| Total | 13,186 |

== The 411 wall ==
411 wall

One of the defining features of the Quisqueya Stadium is its deep center field measuring 411 feet and a massive wall that makes hitting a home run to that area very difficult; standing 18 feet tall, the wall is slightly lower than the 19 foot wall in left field at Progressive Field in Cleveland, US. It is nicknamed the "Green Monster" due to its height and its resemblance to the Green Monster at Fenway Park in Boston, US. Nevertheless, some players have managed to pull off the feat, with Juan Francisco being the only one to do so four times earning him the nickname "Mr. 411".

In addition to Francisco, others who have hit home runs to the 411 wall include:

| Player | Team | Pitcher | Rival team | Date |
|---|---|---|---|---|
| Dick Stuart | Águilas Cibaeñas | Roy Rippelmayer | Estrellas Orientales | November 9, 1957 |
| Alonzo Perry | Tigres del Licey | Fred Kipp | Leones del Escogido | January 22, 1958 |
| Frank Howard | Leones del Escogido | Manuel Polando | Tigres del Licey | January 17, 1960 |
| Bernardo Brito | Tigres del Licey | Fidel Comprés | Leones del Escogido | December 8, 1990 |
| Raúl Mondesí | Leones del Escogido | Hipólito Pichardo | Águilas Cibaeñas | January 13, 1995 |
| Israel Alcántara | Tigres del Licey | Juan Brito | Estrellas Orientales | October 29, 2001 |
| Henry Mercedes | Leones del Escogido | Efraín Valdez | Estrellas Orientales | December 14, 2001 |
| Henry Rodríguez | Tigres del Licey | Agustín Montero | Estrellas Orientales | December 7, 2004 |
| Félix José | Estrellas Orientales | Gustavo Martínez | Leones del Escogido | November 16, 2005 |
| Juan Francisco | Gigantes del Cibao | Robert Coehlo | Tigres del Licey | November 18, 2010 |
| Juan Francisco | Gigantes del Cibao | Louis Coleman | Leones del Escogido | December 1, 2010 |
| Juan Francisco | Tigres del Licey | Jeffry Antigua | Toros del Este | October 22, 2013 |
| Juan Francisco | Tigres del Licey | Edward Valdez | Leones del Escogido | January 21, 2014 |
| Seuly Matías | Gigantes del Cibao | Kent Emmanuel | Tigres del Licey | December 10, 2020 |
| Elly De La Cruz | Tigres del Licey | Lázaro Blanco | Estrellas Orientales | October 24, 2022 |
| Sandber Pimentel | Leones del Escogido | Miguel Diaz | Tigres del Licey | October 20, 2024 |
| Junior Caminero | Leones del Escogido | Jairo Asencio | Tigres del Licey | January 27, 2025 |

== Séptimo Cielo ==
Grandstand (2026)

Séptimo Cielo (English: Seventh Heaven) is the popular name for the area located at the very top of the stadium, primarily designated for sports journalists and the broadcasting of baseball games.

It is a popular name related to its location at the top of the stadium, approximately 40 meters high, equivalent to a five-story building.

== Ticket policy ==
Tigres del Licey and Leones del Escogido ticket office at the stadium, 2026

According to the terms published by Tigres del Licey and the stadium’s safety regulations:

- Final sale: Tickets generally cannot be exchanged or refunded, except in cases expressly provided for in the purchase terms.
- Purchase limit: The team may set a limit on the number of tickets per person.
- Security screening: Attendees may be subject to searches of their belongings. Refusal may result in denial of entry or removal from the venue.
- Lost or stolen tickets: Replacement is not guaranteed and is subject to the team’s policies.
- Use of likeness: By attending Licey games, the ticket holder agrees to the published terms regarding the use of their likeness in photographs, videos, and broadcasts.

== Rebuilding projects ==
Stadium main entrance, 2026

In 2007, the stadium underwent a rebuilding job which expanded its number of seats and the overall look of the field. The bullpens are now enclosed and out of play.

Former president Leonel Fernández also announced in 2009 that there were plans to turn the stadium and the adjacent area into a modern sports complex named Centro Deportivo y Cultural Juan Marichal, in honor of one of the Dominicans in the Major League Baseball Hall of Fame, Juan Marichal.

The construction of a five-star hotel at the end of the central garden that would consist of 150 rooms was also in the pipeline, in addition to a building that would house a casino and a sports museum. Due to the criticism received from many sectors for the way in which the remodeling was going to be financed, the Dominican state announced the suspension of the project.

For the 2010–11 season, the bleacher area was reduced from 9,600 seats to 9,500 to expand "Palcos AA" boxes from 5,843 to 7,443 seats. For the 2014–15 season it was renewed again and the area of the bleachers was reduced from 9,500 to 8,015 and other areas as well.

President Luis Abinader, issued a decree No. 306-25 that creates a consultative commission with the objective of evaluating the feasibility of building a new stadium and a set of works around the Quisqueya Stadium. The commission will have to report to Abinader on the proposal for a public-private initiative. The order issued by the executive explains that the venue must meet all the requirements to host Major League Baseball (MLB) teams.

== Events ==
| Competence/Band/Artist | Event/tour | Date | Attendance |
|---|---|---|---|
1972 Caribbean Series
1976 Caribbean Series
1980 Caribbean Series
1988 Caribbean Series
1996 Caribbean Series
2000 Caribbean Series
| Marco Antonio Solís, Sergio Vargas and Toño Rosario | | July 1, 2001 | |
| Luis Miguel | Mis Romances Tour | February 20, 2002 | 25,000 |
| Shakira | Tour of the Mongoose | May 6, 2003 | |
| Maná | Revolución de Amor Tour | May 13, 2003 | 7,000 / 12,000 |
2004 Caribbean Series
| Steve Green | | February 26, 2005 | |
| Ricky Martin | Ricky Martin... Live Black & White Tour | February 16, 2007 | 25,000 |
| Enrique Iglesias | Insomniac World Tour | April 18, 2008 | |
| Aventura | K.O.B Tour | April 26, 2008 | |
| Maná | Amar es Combatir Tour | June 13, 2008 | 20,000+ |
| Luis Miguel | Cómplices Tour | November 12, 2008 | 25,000 |
| Chayanne & Marc Anthony | | March 26, 2011 | 25,000 |
| Luis Miguel | Luis Miguel Tour | May 11, 2011 | |
2012 Caribbean Series
| Maná | Drama y Luz World Tour | March 14, 2012 | |
| Ricardo Arjona | Metamorfosis: En Vivo | September 8, 2012 | |
| Alejandro Sanz | Confidencias World Tour | March 22, 2014 | |
| Barbarrella 2014 | | June 28, 2014 | |
| Barbarella 2015 | | June 6, 2015 | |
| Violetta | Violetta Live | June 13, 2015 | |
2016 Caribbean Series
2016 CFU Club Championship
| Ricardo Arjona | Circo Soledad World Tour | February 8, 2018 | |
| Soy Luna | Soy Luna en Vivo | September 18, 2018 | |
| Anuel AA & Karol G | | May 19, 2019 | |
| Bad Bunny | X100pre | June 15, 2019 | 30,000 |
2022 Caribbean Series
| Wisin & Yandel | La Última Misión World Tour | July 9, 2022 | 15,000+ |
| Arcángel | Just in Time World Tour | June 10 & 11, 2023 | |
| Marc Anthony | Historia Tour | Aug 24, 2024 | |
| Marco Antonio Solís | Mas Cerca De Ti World Tour | 2025 | |
| Grupo Barak | Dios Fuerte Tour | 2025 | |
| Anuel AA | RHLM 2 WORLD TOUR | 2025 | |
| Christian Nodal | | 2025 | |
| Dominican Republic men's national baseball team vs Detroit Tigers | 2026 World Baseball Classic | March 3 & 4, 2026 | |
| Ed Sheeran | Loop Tour | 2026 | |
| Kany García | Puerta Abierta Tour | 2026 | |
| Chayanne | Bailemos Otra Vez Tour | 2026 | |
| David Guetta | The Monolith Tour | 2026 | |
| Baseball at the 2026 Central American and Caribbean Games | 2026 Central American and Caribbean Games | | |

== Climate ==
Estadio Quisqueya Juan Marichal

Climate chart (precipitation, max. and min. temperature)
| J | F | M | A | M | J | J | A | S | O | N | D |
| 68 30 21 | 59 30 21 | 54 31 22 | 86 31 23 | 151 31 24 | 119 32 24 | 157 32 24 | 195 32 24 | 192 32 24 | 177 32 24 | 148 31 23 | 77 31 22 |
- █ Average max. and min. temperatures in °C
- █ Precipitation totals in mm
Imperial conversion
| J | F | M | A | M | J | J | A | S | O | N | D |
| 2.7 86 70 | 2.3 86 70 | 2.1 87 71 | 3.4 88 73 | 6 88 74 | 4.7 89 76 | 6.2 90 76 | 7.7 90 76 | 7.5 90 75 | 7 90 75 | 5.8 88 73 | 3 87 71 |
- █ Average max. and min. temperatures in °F
- █ Precipitation totals in inches

== See also ==
- Estadio Olímpico Félix Sánchez, an open-air multi-purpose stadium located on Centro Olímpico Juan Pablo Duarte in Santo Domingo, home of the Dominican football teams O&M FC and Atlético Pantoja, also is of one of three stadiums to have served as home of the Dominican Football Federation.
- Arena Banreservas Virgilio Travieso Soto, a multi-purpose indoor arena located on Centro Olímpico Juan Pablo Duarte in Santo Domingo, is home of the Dominican Basketball Federation.
- Estadio Cibao, is a multi-use stadium in Santiago, home of Águilas Cibaeñas.
- Dominican Republic men's national baseball team.
- Estadio La Normal.

== Notes ==
| Preceded by Estadio La Normal | Home of Tigres del Licey; 1955 – Present | Succeeded by current |
| Preceded by Estadio La Normal | Home of Leones del Escogido; 1955 – Present | Succeeded by current |
| Preceded by Estadio Teodoro Mariscal; Mazatlán | Caribbean Series; 2022 | Succeeded by Estadio Monumental de Caracas Simón Bolívar & Estadio Fórum La Guaira; Caracas and La Guaira |
