= Gilberto Rondón =

American baseball player (born 1953)

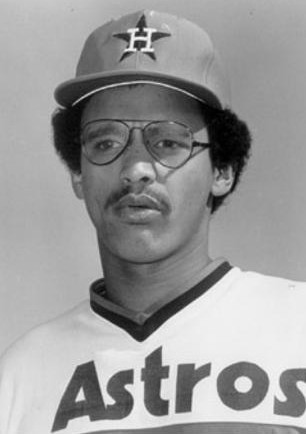
- Rondón in 1976
- Pitcher
- Born: November 18, 1953 (age 72); The Bronx, New York, U.S.
- Batted: Right Threw: Right

MLB debut
- April 10, 1976, for the Houston Astros

Last MLB appearance
- September 29, 1979, for the Chicago White Sox

MLB statistics
- Won–lost record: 2–2
- Earned run average: 5.40
- Strikeouts: 24
- Stats at Baseball Reference

Teams
- Houston Astros (1976); Chicago White Sox (1979)

Gilberto Rondón (born November 18, 1953) is an American former professional baseball pitcher. He played for the Houston Astros and the Chicago White Sox of Major League Baseball (MLB). He batted and threw right-handed and was listed as 6 feet 2 inches (1.88 m) tall and 200 pounds (91 kg).

== Career ==
Rondón was first drafted by the Texas Rangers in the 14th round of the 1972 amateur draft, but did not sign. He was then drafted by the Baltimore Orioles in the 3rd round of the 1973 amateur draft. He spent the 1973 season with the rookie league Bluefield Orioles, and part of the 1974 season with the Single-A Miami Orioles before being released by the Orioles on June 12, 1974. He signed with the California Angels before the 1975 season, and spent the season with the Single-A Salinas Packers and the Double-A El Paso Diablos.

Following the 1975 season Rondón was drafted by the Houston Astros in the Rule 5 draft. He spent the entire 1976 season with the Astros, appearing in 19 games and starting in 7. He spent 1977 in the minor leagues, spending part of the season with the Double-A Columbus Astros and part with the Triple-A Charleston Charlies. His tenure with the Astros organization ended after the 1977 season, when he was drafted by the New York Yankees in the 1977 minor league draft.

Rondón spent the entire 1978 season in the Yankees organization, playing for the Single-A Fort Lauderdale Yankees and later the Double-A West Haven Yankees. Following the season he was purchased from the Yankees by the Leones de Yucatán of the Mexican League, where he spent the 1979 season. On August 1, 1979, the Chicago White Sox purchased him from the Leones, and he played for the Iowa Oaks, the White Sox Triple-A affiliate. He was called up to the major leagues again that September, and appeared in 4 games in relief for the White Sox. Following the season he was purchased back by the Leones. He then signed with the Los Angeles Dodgers and appeared in a few games for the Triple-A Albuquerque Dukes, but he never appeared in a major league game again.

His MLB career pitching line included a won–lost mark of 2–2 and no saves in 23 games pitched, with seven games started; in 631/3 career innings pitched, he allowed 38 earned runs on 81 hits and 45 bases on balls for an earned run average of 5.40, with 24 strikeouts. As a hitter in the National League, be batted .286 in 14 at bats.

Rondón was a coach for Puerto Rico during the 2009 World Baseball Classic.

Rondón was announced as the pitching coach for the Bravos de León of the Mexican Baseball League for the 2018 season.

In 2022, he was named manager for the Empire State Greys of the Frontier League.

Rondon was hired as pitching coach was for the Chatham-Kent Barnstormers of the Intercounty Baseball League for the 2024 season and named manager in 2025. Rondon abruptly left the team partway into his first season as manager and replaced by General Manager and former Toronto Blue Jays minor league player Harry Muir.

== Family ==
Rondón is the son of Diomedes Olivo and the nephew of Chi-Chi Olivo, both of whom played in MLB in the 1960s.

== See also ==
- List of second-generation Major League Baseball players
