= José Offerman =

Dominican baseball player (born 1968)

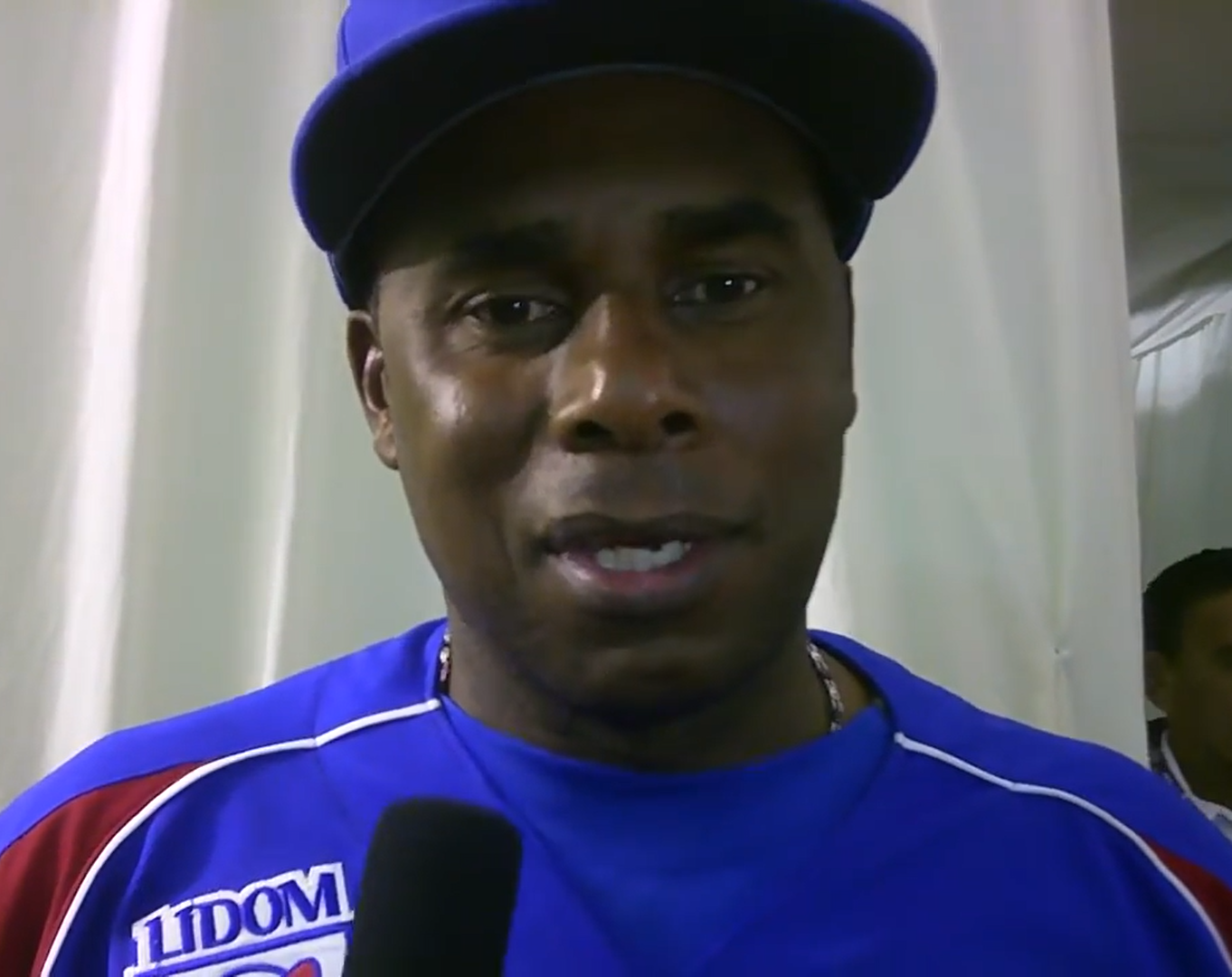
- Offerman during the 2014 Caribbean Series
- Infielder
- Born: November 8, 1968 (age 57); San Pedro de Macorís, Dominican Republic
- Batted: Switch Threw: Right

MLB debut
- August 19, 1990, for the Los Angeles Dodgers

Last MLB appearance
- October 2, 2005, for the New York Mets

MLB statistics
- Batting average: .273
- Home runs: 57
- Runs batted in: 537
- Stats at Baseball Reference

Teams
- Los Angeles Dodgers (1990–1995); Kansas City Royals (1996–1998); Boston Red Sox (1999–2002); Seattle Mariners (2002); Minnesota Twins (2004); Philadelphia Phillies (2005); New York Mets (2005)

Career highlights and awards
- 2× All-Star (1995, 1999)

José Antonio Offerman Dono (born November 8, 1968) is a Dominican professional baseball manager and former infielder who most recently served as the manager for the Algodoneros de Unión Laguna of the Mexican League. He played professional baseball for nearly 20 years, including 15 seasons in Major League Baseball (MLB) and four seasons of independent and Mexican League baseball after leaving MLB.

Offerman most recently managed the Tigres del Licey of the Dominican Professional Baseball League (LIDOM), leading them to the 2008–2009, 2013–2014 and 2022–2023 LIDOM Championship. During a baseball game on January 16, 2010, Offerman attacked an umpire during an argument and, as a result, was banned from LIDOM for three years. He managed the Rojos del Águila de Veracruz of the Mexican League in 2014.

== Early career ==
After attending Colegio Biblico Cristiano High School in San Pedro de Macorís, Offerman signed with the Los Angeles Dodgers as an amateur free agent in 1986. In 1988, he completed his first season of professional play being named as Best Prospect in the Pioneer League. Progressing rapidly through the minor leagues, he made his major league debut against the Montreal Expos on August 19, 1990, becoming the 55th player in major league history to hit a home run in his first major league at-bat.

== Major leagues ==
By 1992, Offerman became the Dodgers' starting shortstop. On opening day 1993, he was the first batter to ever face the Florida Marlins, striking out against Charlie Hough. He made his first appearance in the All-Star Game in 1995 but was traded to the Kansas City Royals after the season, mostly because of his very poor defense. After a year as a utility player, he won the starting second baseman job in 1997. Offerman had his best offensive seasons in Kansas City, culminating in 1998, when he hit .315 with a league-leading 13 triples and the fifth most stolen bases, 45. After that season, he signed with the Boston Red Sox as a free agent, making the All-Star Game for the second time in 1999.

Offerman was a more productive hitter than fielder; in 1992, 1993 and 1995, he committed 42, 37 and 35 errors respectively. Offerman's offensive production declined beginning in 2000. He was sent to the Seattle Mariners during the 2002 season, but was released afterwards. In 2003, he joined the Montreal Expos in spring training but was cut before the regular season began. He spent the entire year with the Bridgeport Bluefish of the independent Atlantic League. In 2004, he won a spot on the Minnesota Twins roster and led the league in pinch-hits with 12 in 29 attempts. He started 2005 with the Philadelphia Phillies but was released after a slow start. Later, he signed with the New York Mets and was called back up to the majors in June.

== Post-USA major leagues ==
Offerman played in the 2008 Caribbean Series for the Tigres del Licey and assisted the team in winning its tenth Caribbean Series title. During the series he signed a contract with the 2008 Veracruz Red Eagles of the Mexican League.

In December 2008, Offerman was named player-manager of Tigres del Licey of the Dominican Professional Baseball League (LIDOM). With Offerman as manager, Licey swept the LIDOM championship, winning five straight against the Gigantes del Cibao. As champions, Licey was then invited to participate in the 2009 Caribbean Series with Offerman as manager (the series was ultimately won by Venezuela).

On January 7, 2014, Offerman was again named manager of the Tigres del Licey of LIDOM, replacing Mike Guerrero. With Offerman at the helm, Licey won the LIDOM Championship, winning five games to three over the Leones del Escogido. As champions again, Licey was invited to the 2014 Caribbean Series with Offerman as manager.

=== Bat incident ===
He has not played or managed professional baseball in the United States since 2007. On August 14, 2007, while playing for the Long Island Ducks of the Atlantic League of Professional Baseball, Offerman was thrown out of a game against the Bridgeport Bluefish for charging Bluefish pitcher Matt Beech with a bat after he was hit by a pitch. Beech sustained a broken finger in the resulting melee. Bluefish catcher John Nathans was also hit in the back of the head during the bench-clearing melee, receiving a severe concussion that effectively ended his playing career. Beech and Nathans were taken to Bridgeport Hospital where they were treated and released. After being removed from the game, Offerman was arrested by the Bridgeport Police.

On August 15, 2007, he was suspended indefinitely. The independent Atlantic League announced on August 17, 2007, that Offerman would remain suspended at least until the legal case was resolved.

On September 24, 2007, Offerman pleaded not guilty to two second degree assault charges.

His case was pending in Bridgeport Superior Court GA#2 in Bridgeport, Connecticut. On October 30, 2007, Offerman was given two years special probation called "Accelerated Rehabilitation." The Court determined that his actions on August 14, 2007, were of an aberrant nature. The Court also found that Offerman is not likely to offend again in the future.

Nathans filed a $4.8 million civil suit against Offerman in February 2009, alleging that he still has post-concussion syndrome and that the injury caused by Offerman ended his baseball career. On July 29, 2014, Nathans won his suit, and Offerman was ordered to pay $940,000.

=== LIDOM incident ===
On 16 January 2010, Offerman once again engaged in an on-field assault when he struck an umpire while managing a LIDOM game. Offerman, manager of the Tigres del Licey, came onto the field during the third inning while losing a 6–0 game to the Gigantes del Cibao, to protest ejection of his catcher for arguing balls and strikes and ended up arguing with first-base umpire D.J. Reyburn. He swung with a right hook at Reyburn, who then fell to the ground. Offerman was detained by stadium security, eventually being transported to the local police station to await the end of the game and Reyburn's decision whether to ask for charges to be pressed against him or not.

A day after the incident, the American crew that umpired the game resigned their positions with LIDOM and left the country, reportedly due to threats and concerns about their own safety. Because of this incident Offerman received a lifetime ban from LIDOM, a suspension that was eventually lifted in February 2013. Coincidentally, at the time he was suspended, Offerman was replacing Dave Jauss as Licey manager after Jauss was suspended himself for two years for bumping an umpire during a playoff game.

== Coaching career ==
=== Conspiradores de Querétaro ===
On February 6, 2024, Offerman joined the Conspiradores de Querétaro of the Mexican League as their manager. He was awarded the 2024 Mexican League Manager of the Year Award.

On June 6, 2025, it was announced that Offerman would be leaving the team, and would be replaced by Rafael Rijo.

=== Algodoneros de Unión Laguna ===
On July 21, 2025, Offerman was hired as the manager for the Algodoneros de Unión Laguna of the Mexican League, replacing Carmelo Martínez, who had been serving in the interim. On October 7, Offerman was fired by the Algodoneros.

== Personal life ==
He is the father of former WWE ring announcer and former reality television star JoJo Offerman.

== See also ==
- List of Major League Baseball annual triples leaders
- List of Major League Baseball career stolen bases leaders
