= Tony Valentine =

Tony Valentine is the name of:

- Anthony Valentine (1939–2015), English actor
- Tony Valentine (baseball) (born 1975), American professional baseball player in the 2000 Caribbean Series
