= Alcibíades Colón =

Dominican baseball player (1919–2016)

- Right fielder
- Born: August 16, 1919; Mao, Valverde, Dominican Republic
- Died: February 15, 2016 (aged 96); Mao, Valverde, Dominican Republic
- Batted: Right Threw: Right

Career highlights and awards
- 1950 Baseball World Cup (silver medal); Dominican Sports Hall of Fame induction (1991)

Alcibíades Colón Inoa (August 16, 1919 – February 15, 2016) was a Dominican professional baseball player. Colón was born in the city of Mao, the head municipality of the Valverde Province in the northwest of the country.

Colón is best known for having been part of the Dominican Republic national baseball team in 1950 and represent his country in international tournaments. Additionally, he played in the professional leagues of the Dominican Republic, Mexico, Puerto Rico and Venezuela, and has the distinction for getting the first hit in the history of Quisqueya Stadium.

A line drive hitter and aggressive baserunner, Colón also was a steady defensive right fielder with a strong throwing arm. He started playing amateur baseball with several sport clubs, before joining the Dominican Army baseball team in the late 1940s. After that, he was selected for the national baseball team that competed in the 1950 Baseball World Cup held at Managua, Nicaragua, in which participated 12 countries.

In a BWC tournament wrapped in controversy, the Dominican Republic squad finished in a three-way tie with the teams of Cuba and Venezuela, all with an identical 9–2 record, making it necessary to play a three-team, round-robin playoff which finally was won by the Dominicans. Nevertheless, this playoff was annulled when the International Baseball Federation officials agreed to disqualify Puerto Rico for using professional players during the tournament. As a result, an opening round loss of Cuba to Puerto Rico was changed to a forfeit victory for the Cubans, leaving them with a 10–1 record and the gold medal. Dominican Republic had to settle for the silver medal and the bronze medal went to Venezuela. Colón was a bright spot for his team, compiling a pretty solid batting average of .386 (17-for-44) and 11 runs scored while batting third in the order.

Following his stellar performance in the World Cup, Colón was signed to play with the Tigres del Licey during the 1951 Dominican winter season, as he helped the team win the pennant in his professional debut. Afterwards, he played for the Criollos de Caguas of the Puerto Rican league in 1952, before returning to Licey in 1953. That season, Colón batted .338 while Licey claimed its second title in three years. Then, in 1954, Colón hit .306 for the Tigres and also had time to play nine games for the Patriotas de Venezuela club of the Venezuelan league late in the season.

In the summer of 1955, Colón formed part of the Diablos Rojos del México club of the Mexican League. He then rejoined Licey for the upcoming winter season.

The Estadio Quisqueya in Santo Domingo was inaugurated on October 23, 1955, with a game between Licey and the visiting Estrellas Orientales. In this game Colón went 3-for-4, including the first hit and the first run scored against Estrellas pitcher Don Elston, making history as the first player to do it in the new stadium. Licey prevailed, 8–7, while pitcher Chi-Chi Olivo was credited with the win.

Even so, in 1956 Olivo was used sparingly by Licey manager Ed Lopat and decided to retire at the end of the season.

After baseball, Colón received numerous public tributes for his contributions on and off the field. In 1991, he was enshrined in the Dominican Sports Hall of Fame for his contributions to the sport of baseball.

Colón died in 2016 at his home of Mao, Dominican Republic, at the age of 96.
