= Dominican Professional Baseball League =

Professional baseball league in Dominican Republic

Dominican Republic Professional Baseball League
- Current season, competition or edition: 2026–27 LIDOM season
- Sport: Baseball
- Founded: 1951; 75 years ago
- First season: 1951 (summer); 1955–56 (winter)
- President: Vitelio Mejía Ortiz
- No. of teams: 6
- Country: Dominican Republic
- Confederation: CPBC; WBSC Americas
- Continent: North America
- Most recent champion: Leones del Escogido (18th title)
- Most titles: Tigres del Licey (24 titles)
- Broadcasters: List of broadcasters
- Related competitions: Caribbean Series
- Website: lidom.com (in Spanish)

The Dominican Republic Professional Baseball League (Spanish: Liga de Béisbol Profesional de la República Dominicana, abbreviation; LIDOM) is a professional baseball winter league consisting of six teams spread across the Dominican Republic; it is the highest level of professional baseball played in the Dominican Republic. The league's players include many prospects that go on to play Major League Baseball in the United States and Canada while also signing many current MLB veterans. The champion of LIDOM advances to play in the yearly Caribbean Series.

Each team plays a fifty-game round-robin schedule that begins in mid October and runs to the end of December. The top four teams engage in another round-robin schedule with 18 games per team from the end of December to the end of January; the top two teams in those standings then play a best-of-seven series for the national title. The league's champion advances to the Caribbean Series to play against the representatives from Mexico, Puerto Rico and Venezuela.

== History ==
Four amateur clubs established in the early 1900s still exist today, and form the foundation of Dominican professional baseball: Tigres del Licey in 1907, Estrellas Orientales in 1911, Leones del Escogido in 1921, and Sandino (later renamed Águilas Cibaeñas) in 1937.

The first attempts at an organized professional league came about in the 1920s. Licey, the most successful of the existing amateur teams in Santo Domingo, played a series of 32 games against an all-star team known as "Escogido" ("the chosen ones"); that tournament was won by Escogido, though Caratini (Licey) took the batting title. A second tournament held the following year, now with four teams (Escogido, Licey, Santiago and San Pedro de Macorís) was suspended with only 34 games of the 48-game schedule played, after Escogido withdrew in protest of a controversial decision to nullify a victory over Licey. Licey won the 1924 series, contested against Escogido, as they did in 1929. However, professional baseball saw a hiatus after the 1930 San Zenón hurricane destroyed both La Primavera and the Gimnasio Escolar, the two existing venues for baseball in Santo Domingo.

During the years 1930–1963, military dictator General Rafael Trujillo can be credited with furthering the sport of baseball in Dominican Republic. Trujillo encouraged many sugar refineries to create teams of cane cutting laborers to play baseball during the idle months of cultivation. Fostering high levels of competition, the organization structure continued to mature stimulating growth in the intensity and popularity of the game. Another professional tournament was established in 1936, this time with four teams: Licey, Escogido, Santiago, and Estrellas Orientales, which won the 1936 tournament.

In 1937, Licey and Escogido, the two teams in Santo Domingo (now renamed "Ciudad Trujillo"), were merged into the "Dragones de Ciudad Trujillo," a team sponsored by the dictator Trujillo himself. teams of the Dominican Republic signed a large number of players from the Negro leagues of the United States, attracting them with large salaries by Dominicans with money and political power. Among these players were future Hall of Famers James Thomas "Cool Papa" Bell, Josh Gibson, and Satchel Paige. Gibson won the batting title (.453) and Paige earned the most wins, as Dragones defeated Aguilas Cibaeñas. However, the lavish contracts exhausted team finances, leading to a decline of Dominican baseball until 1950.

Many of the teams were nearly bankrupted after the 1937 season, and no professional tournament was attempted for the next 14 years. The best Dominican professionals left to play in Cuba, Puerto Rico, or in the American Negro leagues, while popular attention on the island turned to the amateur teams (which, in many cases, were effectively semi-pro teams). However, Dominican victories in the Amateur World Series and other international competitions spurred calls for a return to professional baseball.

== Current teams ==
Dominican Professional Baseball League team locations

Cap insignia	Team	City	Stadium	Capacity	Founded
	Águilas Cibaeñas	Santiago	Estadio Cibao	18,077	1933
	Estrellas Orientales	San Pedro de Macorís	Estadio Tetelo Vargas	8,000	1910
	Gigantes del Cibao	San Francisco de Macorís	Estadio Julián Javier	12,000	1996
	Leones del Escogido	Santo Domingo	Estadio Quisqueya Juan Marichal	13,186	1921
	Tigres del Licey	Santo Domingo	Estadio Quisqueya Juan Marichal	13,186	1907
	Toros del Este	La Romana	Estadio Francisco Micheli	8,838	1983

=== Former teams ===
- Azucareros del Este, 1983–2008, a former name of the current Toros del Este
- Caimanes del Sur (San Cristóbal), during 1983–1989
- Delfines del Atlántico (Puerto Plata), this team was never officially in the league and did not play
- Pollos del Cibao / Pollos Nacionales / Pollos Béisbol Club (San Francisco de Macorís) during 1999–2002, previously Gigantes del Nordeste, currently Gigantes del Cibao

== Championship history ==
=== Pre-LIDOM era (1922–37) ===
Season	Champion	Manager	Record	Runner-up
1922	Leones del Escogido	Luis Alfau	23–9	Tigres del Licey
1923	Season not completed			
1924	Tigres del Licey	Charles Alexander Dore	17–15	Leones del Escogido
1929	Tigres del Licey	Charles Alexander Dore	11–7	Leones del Escogido
1936	Estrellas Orientales	Enrique Mejía	13–5	Aguilas Cibaeñas
1937	Dragones de Ciudad Trujillo	Burrulote Rodríguez	18–13	Aguilas Cibaeñas

=== Modern era (1951–present) ===
Season	Champion	Manager	Final Series	Runner-up
1951	Tigres del Licey	Félix Delgado	4–1	Leones del Escogido
1952	Águilas Cibaeñas	Rodolfo Fernández	4–3	Tigres del Licey
1953	Tigres del Licey	Oscar Rodríguez	4–1	Águilas Cibaeñas
1954	Estrellas Orientales	Ramón Bragaña	4–1	Tigres del Licey
1955–56	Leones del Escogido	Frank Genovese	4–3	Águilas Cibaeñas
1956–57	Leones del Escogido	Red Davis	5–2	Tigres del Licey
1957–58	Leones del Escogido	Salty Parker	5–1	Estrellas Orientales
1958–59	Tigres del Licey	Joe Schultz	5–4	Leones del Escogido
1959–60	Leones del Escogido	Pete Reiser	5–1	Estrellas Orientales
1960–61	Leones del Escogido	Pepe Lucas	5–2	Águilas Cibaeñas
1961–62 season not completed due to the fall of Rafael Trujillo
1962–63 season not held due to political instability
1963–64	Tigres del Licey	Vernon Benson	5–3	Águilas Cibaeñas
1964–65	Águilas Cibaeñas	Al Widmar	5–0	Leones del Escogido
1965–66 season not held due to US occupation of the Dominican Republic
1966–67	Águilas Cibaeñas	Pete Peterson	5–3	Leones del Escogido
1967–68	Estrellas Orientales	Tony Pacheco	5–3	Leones del Escogido
1968–69	Leones del Escogido	Andy Gilbert	5–2	Estrellas Orientales
1969–70	Tigres del Licey	Manny Mota	5–1	Águilas Cibaeñas
1970–71	Tigres del Licey	Manny Mota	6–1	Leones del Escogido
1971–72	Águilas Cibaeñas	Ozzie Virgil	5–3	Tigres del Licey
1972–73	Tigres del Licey	Tom Lasorda	5–2	Estrellas Orientales
1973–74	Tigres del Licey	Tom Lasorda	5–2	Águilas Cibaeñas
1974–75	Águilas Cibaeñas	Al Widmar	5–4	Estrellas Orientales
1975–76	Águilas Cibaeñas	Tim Murtaugh	5–3	Tigres del Licey
1976–77	Tigres del Licey	Buck Rodgers	5–2	Águilas Cibaeñas
1977–78	Águilas Cibaeñas	Johnny Lipon	5–2	Tigres del Licey
1978–79	Águilas Cibaeñas	Johnny Lipon	5–0	Leones del Escogido
1979–80	Tigres del Licey	Del Crandall	5–1	Estrellas Orientales
1980–81	Leones del Escogido	Felipe Rojas Alou	5–4	Águilas Cibaeñas
1981–82	Leones del Escogido	Felipe Rojas Alou	5–1	Estrellas Orientales
1982–83	Tigres del Licey	Manny Mota	5–2	Águilas Cibaeñas
1983–84	Tigres del Licey	Manny Mota	4–3	Águilas Cibaeñas
1984–85	Tigres del Licey	Terry Collins	4–1	Azucareros del Este
1985–86	Águilas Cibaeñas	Winston Llenas	4–1	Tigres del Licey
1986–87	Águilas Cibaeñas	Winston Llenas	4–1	Estrellas Orientales
1987–88	Leones del Escogido	Phil Regan	4–3	Estrellas Orientales
1988–89	Leones del Escogido	Phil Regan	4–0	Tigres del Licey
1989–90	Leones del Escogido	Felipe Rojas Alou	4–1	Águilas Cibaeñas
1990–91	Tigres del Licey	John Roseboro	4–1	Leones del Escogido
1991–92	Leones del Escogido	Felipe Rojas Alou	4–0	Estrellas Orientales
1992–93	Águilas Cibaeñas	Miguel Diloné	4–2	Azucareros del Este
1993–94	Tigres del Licey	Casey Parsons	4–1	Águilas Cibaeñas
1994–95	Azucareros del Este	Art Howe	4–2	Águilas Cibaeñas
1995–96	Águilas Cibaeñas	Terry Francona	4–1	Estrellas Orientales
1996–97	Águilas Cibaeñas	Mike Quade	4–0	Leones del Escogido
1997–98	Águilas Cibaeñas	Tony Peña	4–2	Tigres del Licey
1998–99	Tigres del Licey	Dave Jauss	5–4	Leones del Escogido
1999–00	Águilas Cibaeñas	Tony Peña	4–3	Estrellas Orientales
2000–01	Águilas Cibaeñas	Félix Fermín	4–2	Leones del Escogido
2001–02	Tigres del Licey	Bob Geren	4–3	Águilas Cibaeñas
2002–03	Águilas Cibaeñas	Félix Fermín	4–0	Leones del Escogido
2003–04	Tigres del Licey	Manny Acta	4–1	Gigantes del Cibao
2004–05	Águilas Cibaeñas	Félix Fermín	4–3	Tigres del Licey
2005–06	Tigres del Licey	Rafael Landestoy	5–2	Águilas Cibaeñas
2006–07	Águilas Cibaeñas	Félix Fermín	5–1	Tigres del Licey
2007–08	Águilas Cibaeñas	Félix Fermín	5–3	Tigres del Licey (Note: Two Dominican teams participated in the 2008 Caribbean Series)
2008–09	Tigres del Licey	José Offerman	5–0	Gigantes del Cibao
2009–10	Leones del Escogido	Ken Oberkfell	5–4	Gigantes del Cibao
2010–11	Toros del Este	Dean Treanor	5–0	Estrellas Orientales
2011–12	Leones del Escogido	Ken Oberkfell	5–4	Águilas Cibaeñas
2012–13	Leones del Escogido	Audo Vicente	5–0	Águilas Cibaeñas
2013–14	Tigres del Licey	Jose Offerman	5–2	Leones del Escogido
2014–15	Gigantes del Cibao	Audo Vicente	5–3	Estrellas Orientales
2015–16	Leones del Escogido	Luis Rojas	5–1	Tigres del Licey
2016–17	Tigres del Licey	Audo Vicente	5–4	Águilas Cibaeñas
2017–18	Águilas Cibaeñas	Lino Rivera	4–3	Tigres del Licey
2018–19	Estrellas Orientales	Fernando Tatís	5–1	Toros del Este
2019–20	Toros del Este	Lino Rivera	5–3	Tigres del Licey
2020–21	Aguilas Cibaeñas	Félix Fermín	4–3	Gigantes del Cibao
2021–22	Gigantes del Cibao	Luis Urueta	4–1	Estrellas Orientales
2022–23	Tigres del Licey	Jose Offerman	4–1	Estrellas Orientales
2023–24	Tigres del Licey	Gilbert Gomez	4–3	Estrellas Orientales
2024–25	Leones del Escogido	Albert Pujols	4–3	Tigres del Licey
2025–26	Leones del Escogido	Ramón Santiago	4–1	Toros del Este

Won Caribbean Series

Team	Championships
Tigres del Licey	24 (2)*
Águilas Cibaeñas	22
Leones del Escogido	18 (1)*
Estrellas Orientales	3 (1)*
Toros del Este	3
Gigantes del Cibao	2
Dragones de Ciudad Trujillo	0 (1)*
Caimanes del Sur	0

*Championships won before LIDOM (1951)

== Statistical leaders ==
*	Denotes elected to National Baseball Hall of Fame.
**Bold**	Denotes an active player. (Note: A player is considered inactive if he has announced his retirement or not played for a full season.)

=== Career leaders ===
Batting leaders
Stat	Player	Years	Total	Team(s)
AVG	(Dominican Republic) Manuel Mota	1957–1980	.333	Escogido, Licey
HR	(Dominican Republic) **Juan Francisco**	2007–2025	85	Licey, Toros, Gigantes, Águilas
RBI	(Dominican Republic) Rafael Batista	1964–1985	395	Estrellas
R	(Dominican Republic) Luis Polonia	1984–2010	517	Águilas
H	(Dominican Republic) Luis Polonia	1984–2010	927	Águilas
SB	(Dominican Republic) Miguel Diloné	1974–1994	395	Águilas
OBP	(Dominican Republic) Stanley Javier	1981–2002	.416	Águilas
SLG	(Dominican Republic) Alonzo Perry	1951–1959	.490	Licey, Estrellas

Pitching leaders
Stat	Player	Years	Total	Team(s)
W	(Dominican Republic) Diomedes Olivo	1951–1964	86	Licey
ERA	(Dominican Republic) Juan Marichal	1957–1974	1.87	Escogido
WHIP	(Dominican Republic) Juan Marichal	1957–1974	1.04	Escogido
GS	(Cuba) **Raúl Valdés**	2003–2025	161	Licey, Toros, Estrellas, Gigantes, Escogido, Águilas
SV	(Dominican Republic) **Jairo Asencio**	2010–2025	169	Licey
G	(Dominican Republic) Ramón de los Santos	1971–1987	364	Licey, Estrellas, Escogido
CG	(Dominican Republic) Diomedes Olivo	1951–1964	70	Licey
IP	(Dominican Republic) Federico Olivo	1951–1972	1335.2	Licey, Estrellas
K	(Dominican Republic) Diomedes Olivo	1951–1964	742	Licey
Shutouts	(Dominican Republic) Diomedes Olivo	1951–1964	14	Licey

=== Single-season leaders ===
Batting leaders
Stat	Player	Season	Total	Team(s)
AVG	(United States) Ralph Garr	1970–71	.457	Estrellas
HR	(Dominican Republic) Víctor Díaz	2008–09	17	Águilas
RBI	(Dominican Republic) Alonzo Perry	1953	53	Licey,
R	(United States) Ralph Garr	1970–71	58	Estrellas
H	(United States) Ralph Garr	1970–71	105	Estrellas
SB	(Dominican Republic) Miguel Diloné	1976–77	44	Águilas
OBP	(United States) Jeff DaVanon	2001–02	.514	Águilas
SLG	(United States) Andy Barkett	2000–01	.736	Águilas

Pitching leaders
Stat	Player	Season	Total	Team(s)
W	(United States) Terris McDuffie	1952	12	Águilas
ERA	(Dominican Republic) Bartolo Colón	1996–97	0.21	Águilas
ERA	(Dominican Republic) Rafael Soriano	2003–04	0.21	Escogido
WHIP	(Dominican Republic) **Edwin Uceta**	2021–22	0.63	Estrellas
GS	(Dominican Republic) Danilo Rivas	1960–61	20	Escogido
SV	(Dominican Republic) Marcos Mateo	2014–15	21	Estrellas
G	(Dominican Republic) Víctor Cruz	1976–77	35	Licey
G	(Dominican Republic) Carlos Julio Pérez	1977–78	35	Licey
G	(United States) Charlie Hough	1970–71	35	Escogido
CG	(United States) Terris McDuffie	1952	15	Águilas
IP	(United States) Fred Waters	1955–56	173.2	Águilas
K	(Dominican Republic) Diomedes Olivo	1960–61	160	Licey
Shutouts	(United States) Norman Rehm	1957–58	14	Estrellas
Shutouts	(United States) Fred Kipp	1957–58	14	Licey

== Honors and awards ==
=== Most Valuable Player ===
Season	Player	Team
1977–78	(Dominican Republic) Carlos Pérez	Tigres del Licey
1978–79	(United States) Bob Beall	Águilas Cibaeñas
1979–80	(United States) Jerry Dybzinski	Tigres del Licey
1980–81	(Dominican Republic) Tony Peña	Águilas Cibaeñas
1981–82	(Dominican Republic) Tony Peña	Águilas Cibaeñas
1982–83	(Dominican Republic) Tony Peña	Águilas Cibaeñas
1983–84	(Dominican Republic) Rufino Linares	Caimanes del Sur
1984–85	(United States) Ken Howell	Tigres del Licey
1985–86	(Dominican Republic) Rufino Linares	Leones del Escogido
1986–87	(United States) Bob Brower	Toros del Este
1987–88	(United States) Mark Parent	Estrellas Orientales
1988–89	(Dominican Republic) Domingo Michel	Tigres del Licey
1989–90	(United States) Dave Hansen	Tigres del Licey
1990–91	(Dominican Republic) Andújar Cedeño	Toros del Este
1991–92	(Dominican Republic) Luis Mercedes	Estrellas Orientales
1992–93	(United States) Tom Marsh	Águilas Cibaeñas
1993–94	(Dominican Republic) Gerónimo Berroa	Leones del Escogido
1994–95	(Dominican Republic) Domingo Martínez	Águilas Cibaeñas
1995–96	(Panama) Sherman Obando	Águilas Cibaeñas
1996–97	(Dominican Republic) Tony Batista	Águilas Cibaeñas
1997–98	(Dominican Republic) José Oliva	Estrellas Orientales
1998–99	(Dominican Republic) Adrián Beltré	Águilas Cibaeñas
1999–00	(Dominican Republic) David Ortiz	Leones del Escogido
2000–01	(Dominican Republic) Félix José	Estrellas Orientales
2001–02	(United States) Eric Byrnes	Tigres del Licey
2002–03	(Dominican Republic) Félix José	Estrellas Orientales
2003–04	(Dominican Republic) Julio Ramírez	Gigantes del Cibao
2004–05	(Dominican Republic) Erick Almonte	Estrellas Orientales
2005–06	(Dominican Republic) Willis Otáñez	Tigres del Licey
2006–07	(Dominican Republic) Erick Almonte	Gigantes del Cibao
2007–08	(Cuba) Brayan Peña	Gigantes del Cibao
2008–09	(Dominican Republic) Víctor Díaz	Águilas Cibaeñas
2009–10	(Dominican Republic) Juan Francisco	Gigantes del Cibao
2010–11	(Dominican Republic) Juan Francisco	Gigantes del Cibao
2011–12	(Dominican Republic) Joaquín Arias	Águilas Cibaeñas
2012–13	(Dominican Republic) Héctor Luna	Águilas Cibaeñas
2013–14	(Dominican Republic) Gregory Polanco	Leones del Escogido
2014–15	(Dominican Republic) Marcos Mateo	Estrellas Orientales
2015–16	(United States) Tyler White	Estrellas Orientales
2016–17	(Dominican Republic) Rubén Sosa	Leones del Escogido
2017–18	(Dominican Republic) Franchy Cordero	Leones del Escogido
2018–19	(Dominican Republic) Jordany Valdespin	Toros del Este
2019–20	(United States) Peter O'Brien	Toros del Este
2020–21	(Dominican Republic) Ronald Guzmán	Gigantes del Cibao
2021–22	(Dominican Republic) César Valdez	Tigres del Licey
2022–23	(Dominican Republic) Ronny Mauricio	Tigres del Licey
2023–24	(Dominican Republic) Ronny Simon	Toros del Este
2024-25	(Dominican Republic) Aderlin Rodríguez	Águilas Cibaeñas
2025-26	(Dominican Republic) Bryan De La Cruz	Toros del Este

== List of broadcasters ==
Dominican Republic
CDN Deportes (Águilas)
Coral 39 (Estrellas, Toros)
Digital 15 (Licey, Escogido)
Telemedios Dominicanos Canal 8 (Gigantes)
Teleuniverso Canal 29 (Águilas)
CTT Canal 49 (Gigantes)
Telenord Canal 14 (Gigantes)
Luna TV Canal 25 (Águilas)
Romana TV Canal 42 y 48 (Toros)
Xtremo Channel (Estrellas)
Claro TV+
Altice TV
Wind Telecom
CableNET Dominicana (Gigantes)

United States
Televisión Dominicana (Gigantes, Toros, Estrellas)
Telemicro Internacional (Licey)

Puerto Rico
Televisión Dominicana (Gigantes, Toros, Estrellas)

Streaming
MLB.tv
YouTube (Licey, Águilas)

== See also ==
- Baseball awards § Dominican Republic
- Dominican Summer League
