= Casey Parsons =

American baseball player (born 1954)

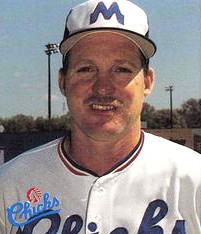
- Parsons in 1988
- Outfielder
- Born: April 14, 1954 (age 72); Wenatchee, Washington, U.S.
- Batted: Left Threw: Right

MLB debut
- May 31, 1981, for the Seattle Mariners

Last MLB appearance
- August 9, 1987, for the Cleveland Indians

MLB statistics
- Batting average: .189
- Home runs: 2
- Runs batted in: 10
- Stats at Baseball Reference

Teams
- Seattle Mariners (1981); Chicago White Sox (1983–1984); Cleveland Indians (1987)

Casey Robert Parsons (born April 14, 1954) is an American former Major League Baseball (MLB) outfielder. He played parts of four seasons in the majors, between 1981 and 1987, for the Seattle Mariners, Chicago White Sox, and Cleveland Indians. Parsons was mostly used as a pinch hitter in MLB. He later managed in the minor leagues for several years in the Oakland Athletics organization.

== Baseball career ==
Parsons attended University High School in Spokane, Washington. He played college baseball for the Gonzaga Bulldogs from 1973 to 1976. He signed as an undrafted free agent with the San Francisco Giants in June 1976. He was traded to the Mariners in June 1980 for a player to be named later, specified later as pitcher Roy Branch.

Parsons reached the majors in May 1981. He played in a career-high 36 MLB games that year, batting 5-for-22 and hitting a home run on September 7 off Richard Dotson of the Chicago White Sox. He returned to the minors in 1982, then elected free agency. He signed with the White Sox, playing in eight games in 1983 and one game in 1984. After two years in the St. Louis Cardinals organization, he signed with Cleveland in November 1986. He played in 18 games for Cleveland in 1987. His second and final MLB home run was a grand slam off Mark Eichhorn of the Toronto Blue Jays on August 6, which led Parsons to give a curtain call at Cleveland Stadium.

In four MLB seasons, he played in 63 games. In fewer than half of his appearances, 31 games did he appear as a fielder. Parsons was used as a pinch hitter or pinch runner 48 times.

Following his playing career, Parsons coached and managed in the minor leagues. He was a player-coach with the Memphis Chicks in the Kansas City Royals organization in 1988. He then spent six years as a manager in the Oakland Athletics organization. From 1989 until 1994, he managed five different teams in the minors, helming the Tacoma Tigers his final season. His teams made the playoffs twice, losing in the first round each time. Parsons also named Licey in the Dominican winter league in the 1993–94 season, winning the league and the Caribbean World Series.

== Personal life ==
Parsons has twin daughters who played college golf for the Washington State Cougars.
