= Diomedes Olivo =

Dominican baseball player (1919–1977)

- Pitcher
- Born: January 22, 1919; Guayubín, Dominican Republic
- Died: February 15, 1977 (aged 58); Santo Domingo, Dominican Republic
- Batted: Left Threw: Left

MLB debut
- September 5, 1960, for the Pittsburgh Pirates

Last MLB appearance
- June 12, 1963, for the St. Louis Cardinals

MLB statistics
- Win–loss record: 5–6
- Earned run average: 3.10
- Strikeouts: 85
- Stats at Baseball Reference

Teams
- Pittsburgh Pirates (1960, 1962); St. Louis Cardinals (1963)
Medals
Representing Dominican Republic
Central American and Caribbean Games
Silver medal – second place	1946 Barranquilla	Team

Diomedes Antonio Olivo Maldonado (January 22, 1919 – February 15, 1977), nicknamed "Guayubin" for his hometown, was a Dominican professional baseball player, manager, and scout. The left-handed pitcher appeared in 85 Major League Baseball games over all or part of three seasons between 1960 and 1963 for the Pittsburgh Pirates and St. Louis Cardinals. He was the brother of fellow major leaguer Chi-Chi Olivo, and the father of major league pitcher Gilberto Rondón.

== Career ==
Olivo was listed as 6 feet 1 inch (1.85 m) tall and 195 pounds (88 kg). Prior to his minor league and Major League career, Olivo spent many years playing in his native Dominican Republic, largely with the Tigres del Licey. Olivo holds several records in the Dominican Professional Baseball League (LIDOM), including his 86 career wins and 160 strikeouts in the 1960-61 season. He finished his LIDOM career with 742 strikeouts, 13 shutouts, and a 2.11 earned run average, as well as a no-hitter against the cross-town Leones del Escogido thrown on May 29, 1954.

Diomedes Olivo posted a 55–29 win–loss record in the Double-A Mexican League from 1955–1959, then made his Major League debut with the Pirates at age 41 on September 5, 1960. His age at the time of his MLB debut is the oldest with the exception of Satchel Paige in the post-World War II era. In his first game, he pitched two scoreless innings of relief against the Milwaukee Braves, allowing one hit (to eventual Hall of Famer Eddie Mathews) and two bases on balls.

Olivo's best MLB season came in 1962. At age 43, he worked in 62 games, all but one in relief, and posted a 5–1 record and 2.77 earned run average in 84 1/3 innings pitched, with seven saves. He then was included, with shortstop Dick Groat, in a major off-season trade to the Cardinals, but while Groat sparkled in St. Louis, Olivo lost all five decisions and spent part of 1963 in the minor leagues. He retired at age 44 following that season.

During his MLB career, Olivo allowed 112 hits and 39 bases on balls in 107 1/3 innings pitched, striking out 85.

He scouted for the Cardinals after retiring from the field, and later held a position in the Ministry of Sports in his native country. For a time in the 1970s, he sought political exile in Panama, where he managed the Panama national baseball team. Olivo died from a heart attack at age 58.
