= Tigres del Licey =

Professional baseball team in Santo Domingo, Dominican Republic

Logo	Cap insignia

Information
- League: Dominican Professional Baseball League
- Location: Santo Domingo, Dominican Republic
- Ballpark: Estadio Quisqueya Juan Marichal (1955–present)
- Established: 7 November 1907; 119 years ago
- Nickname(s): El Glorioso ("The Glorious"); El Equipito ("The Little Team"); El Equipo Azul ("The Blue Team"); El Conjunto Azul ("The Blue Ensemble")
- Caribbean Series championships: 11: (1971; 1973; 1977; 1980; 1985; 1991; 1994; 1999; 2004; 2008; 2023)
- League championships: 24: (1951; 1953; 1958–59; 1963–64; 1969–70; 1970–71; 1972–73; 1973–74; 1976-77; 1979–80; 1982–83; 1983–84; 1984–85; 1990–91; 1993–94; 1998–99; 2001–02; 2003–04; 2005–06; 2008–09; 2013–14; 2016–17; 2022–23; 2023–24)
- Former ballpark(s): Hipódromo La Primavera (1922–1929); Estadio La Normal (1951–1955)
- Colors: Royal blue, white
- Mascot: El "Tiguerito" (The "Little Tiger")
- Retired numbers: 2; 5; 7; 8; 9; 11; 11; 15; 17; 20; 45; 80
- President: Miguel Guerra Armenteros
- General manager: Audo Vicente
- Manager: Gilbert Gomez
- Website: www.licey.com (in Spanish)

Current uniforms
Home	Away	Third

Club Atlético Licey, Inc., better known by its commercial name as Tigres del Licey, (TL; English: Licey Tigers) is a professional baseball team in the Dominican Professional Baseball League (LIDOM). The team was founded in 1907 and is based in Santo Domingo, Dominican Republic. Tigres is the oldest team in LIDOM and has won 24 titles of league and 11 Caribbean Series titles, the most out of any team.

It is one of two LIDOM franchises based in the nation's capital, the other being Leones del Escogido; the two teams share Estadio Quisqueya as their home ballpark. Many of the best Dominican players and Major League Baseball players have taken part in the long history of the Tigres, including Tommy Lasorda, a National Baseball Hall of Fame inductee who took the team to the 1973 Caribbean Series title. Licey is nicknamed "El Glorioso" (the Glorious One).

== History ==
The Licey team was founded as the result of a meeting that took place in the house of Vicente María and Jacinto "Pichán" Vallejo, on el Conde Street, in Santo Domingo's Colonial Zone, on 7 November 1907. The club's founding members were Vicente María Vallejo, George "Geo" and Carlos "Cuncún" Pou, Luis and Federico E. Fiallo, Luis Castillo, Salvador Piñeyro, Álvaro Álvarez, Ricardo Arturo "Tutú" Martínez, Ángel and Chichí Mieses, Arturo "Tutulí" Perdomo, Manuel E. "Bi" Sánchez, Virgilio Abreu L., Alberto Peña, Arturo Nolasco and Tulio H. Piña and Virgilio "Niñito" Penson. Many of the founding members of the original team were also part of the first roster.

Over the next 16 years, Licey became so dominant that an agreement was made among the three other competing teams (Los Muchachos, San Carlos and Delco Lite) to form a new team, composed of their best players, in order to beat Licey. This team, called "Leones del Escogido" ( Lions of the Chosen one ), still exists, and the teams share the same stadium in Santo Domingo.

During what Dominicans call the "first stage" of the country's baseball history, games were played only during daylight hours. The game's "second stage" didn’t begin until dictator Rafael Trujillo built the capital's Estadio Quisqueya in 1955, a brilliantly designed and built stadium for the time. With the stadium came lights and what is considered the golden age of Dominican baseball.

Licey has won the Caribbean Series a record 12 times. In an unusual situation during the 2008 season, Licey finished second in the Dominican championship and would have failed to qualify for the series, but took the place of a Puerto Rican team that had withdrawn from the tournament due to financial difficulties. Licey won the series, defeating teams from Mexico and Venezuela as well as Águilas Cibaeñas, their Dominican rivals.

== Retired numbers ==
Pedro; González; 2B; 1957–1970	Alonzo; Perry; 1B / P 1951–1954	Manny; Mota; LF; 1957–1980	Tony; Fernández; SS; 1981–1986	Diomedes Olivo; P 1951–1964	Elvio Jiménez; OF; 1959–1974	Alcibíades Colón; OF; 1951–1957	Luis "Grillo"; Báez; OF; 1951–1954	Rafael Landestoy; OF; 1973–1984	Olmedo; Suarez; OF; 1951–1964	Pedro Martínez; P 1990–1996	César Gerónimo; CF; 1967–1985

== Notable players and managers ==
- Andy Abad
- Pedro Miguel Caratini
- Jesús Alou
- Joaquín Andújar
- Pedro Astacio
- Manny Aybar
- Jim Beauchamp
- George Bell
- Mark Bellhorn
- Ronnie Belliard
- Kurt Bevacqua
- Bruce Bochte
- Pedro Borbón
- Clete Boyer
- Greg Brock
- Byron Browne
- Eric Byrnes
- Sil Campusano
- José Canseco
- Chuck Carr
- Rico Carty
- Luis Castillo
- Reggie Cleveland
- Terry Collins
- Del Crandall
- Deivi Cruz
- Elijah Dukes
- Mariano Duncan
- Leon Durham
- Joe Ferguson
- Sid Fernandez
- Tony Fernández
- Darrin Fletcher
- Steve Garvey
- César Gerónimo
- Bob Gibson
- Pedro González
- Kelly Gruber
- Vladimir Guerrero
- José Guillén
- Cristian Guzmán
- Juan Guzmán
- Dave Hansen
- Mickey Hatcher
- Anderson Hernández
- Orel Hershiser
- Butch Hobson
- Burt Hooton
- Charlie Hough
- Steve Howe
- Al Hrabosky
- D'Angelo Jiménez
- José Jiménez
- Ubaldo Jiménez
- Félix José
- Von Joshua
- Kevin Kennedy
- Rafael Landestoy
- Tommy Lasorda
- Rudy Law
- Jim Lefebvre
- Grady Little
- Mark Little
- Pedro Martínez
- Ramón Martínez
- Ted Martínez
- Mark McGwire
- John McNamara
- José Mesa
- Manny Mota
- Mike Norris
- Alex Ochoa
- José Offerman
- Tony Oliva
- Chi-Chi Olivo
- Diomedes Olivo
- Ramón Ortiz
- John Patterson
- Alejandro Peña
- Carlos Peña
- Carlos Pérez
- Mélido Pérez
- Pascual Pérez
- Timo Pérez
- Alonzo Perry
- Tony Phillips
- Mike Piazza
- Eric Plunk
- Jurickson Profar
- Luis Pujols
- Aramis Ramírez
- Doug Rau
- Édgar Rentería
- Rick Rhoden
- José Rijo
- Mickey Rivers
- Buck Rodgers
- Félix Rodríguez
- Henry Rodríguez
- John Roseboro
- Bill Russell
- Mike Scioscia
- Jorge Sosa
- Steve Sparks
- Joe Stanka
- Terry Steinbach
- Dave Stewart
- Rick Sutcliffe
- Salomón Torres
- Mike Torrez
- John Tudor
- Bobby Valentine
- Chico Walker
- John Wetteland
- Willie Wilson
- Steve Yeager
- Emilio Bonifacio

== Championships ==
Season	Champion	Manager	Sub-Champion
1924	Tigres del Licey		
1929	Tigres del Licey		
1951	Tigres del Licey	Félix Delgado	Leones del Escogido
1953	Tigres del Licey	Oscar Rodríguez	Águilas Cibaeñas
1958-59	Tigres del Licey	Joe Schultz	Leones del Escogido
1963-64	Tigres del Licey	Vernon Benson	Águilas Cibaeñas
1969-70	Tigres del Licey	Billy Muffett	Águilas Cibaeñas
1970-71	Tigres del Licey	Fred Hatfield	Leones del Escogido
1972-73	Tigres del Licey	Tom Lasorda	Estrellas Orientales
1973-74	Tigres del Licey	Tom Lasorda	Águilas Cibaeñas
1976-77	Tigres del Licey	Buck Rodgers	Águilas Cibaeñas
1979-80	Tigres del Licey	Del Crandall	Estrellas Orientales
1982-83	Tigres del Licey	Manny Mota	Águilas Cibaeñas
1983-84	Tigres del Licey	Manny Mota	Águilas Cibaeñas
1984-85	Tigres del Licey	Terry Collins	Azucareros del Este
1990-91	Tigres del Licey	John Roseboro	Leones del Escogido
1993-94	Tigres del Licey	Casey Parsons	Águilas Cibaeñas
1998-99	Tigres del Licey	Dave Jauss	Leones del Escogido
2001–02	Tigres del Licey	Bob Geren	Águilas Cibaeñas
2003–04	Tigres del Licey	Manny Acta	Gigantes del Cibao
2005–06	Tigres del Licey	Rafael Landestoy	Águilas Cibaeñas
2008–09	Tigres del Licey	José Offerman	Gigantes del Cibao
2013-14	Tigres del Licey	José Offerman	Leones del Escogido
2016-17	Tigres del Licey	Audo Vicente	Águilas Cibaeñas
2022-23	Tigres del Licey	José Offerman	Estrellas Orientales
2023-24	Tigres del Licey	Gilbert Gómez	Estrellas Orientales
