= John Nathans =

American baseball player

- Catcher, Outfielder
- Born: June 10, 1979 (age 47); Warwick, New York
- Batted: Right Threw: Right

New York-Pennsylvania League debut
- 2001, for the Lowell Spinners

Last Atlantic League of Professional Baseball appearance
- August 14, 2007, for the Bridgeport Bluefish

Teams
- Lowell Spinners (2001); GCL Red Sox (2001); Augusta GreenJackets (2002); Portland Sea Dogs (2003-2004); Nashua Pride (2005); Lancaster Barnstormers (2005); North Shore Spirit (2005); Newark Bears (2006); Bridgeport Bluefish (2006-2007)

Johnathan Garth Nathans (born June 10, 1979) is an American former professional baseball catcher and outfielder. He last played in 2007 in the Atlantic League of Professional Baseball with the Bridgeport Bluefish.

A native of Warwick, New York, Nathans attended Trinity-Pawling School and the University of Richmond. In 2000, he played collegiate summer baseball with the Cotuit Kettleers of the Cape Cod Baseball League.

In a 2007 game, Bluefish pitcher Matt Beech hit opposing batter José Offerman with a pitch; Offerman then charged the mound with the bat. Nathans ran to the mound and attempted to stop Offerman from attacking Beech, but was struck in the head and sustained a concussion. Beech's finger was also broken during this incident.

The concussion ended Nathans' playing career. Nathans later won a lawsuit against Offerman for ending his career.
