= Jon Weber (baseball) =

American baseball player (born 1978)

- Outfielder
- Born: January 20, 1978 (age 48); Lakewood, California, U.S.
- Bats: Left Throws: Left
- Stats at Baseball Reference

Medal record

Men's baseball

Representing United States

Baseball World Cup
Gold medal – first place	2009 Nettuno	National team

Jonathan Brian Weber (born January 20, 1978) is an American former professional baseball player. An outfielder, Weber batted and threw left-handed. Considered a journeyman throughout his career, Weber played professionally in minor and independent league baseball from 1999 to 2015. Weber also competed for the United States national baseball team, winning the gold medal at the 2009 Baseball World Cup.

== Amateur career ==
Weber was born in Lakewood, California. He attended Lakewood High School in Lakewood, California. There, he played for the school's baseball team, known as the Lancers, graduating in 1996.

Out of high school, Weber was selected by the Oakland Athletics in the thirty-first round of the 1997 Major League Baseball draft. He chose not to sign with the Athletics, opting to attend college. He began his college baseball career at Los Angeles Harbor College (LAHC) of the National Junior College Athletic Association (NJCAA) in 1997. At LAHC, Weber was a NJCAA All-America selection.

In 1999, Weber transferred to Texas Tech University to compete in the NCAA Division I during his junior year. At Texas Tech, he played college baseball for the Texas Tech Red Raiders baseball team in the Big 12 Conference. Weber led the conference with eight triples, setting a Red Raiders team record in the process. He was named the Collegiate Baseball National Player of the Week and Big 12 Baseball Player/Pitcher of the Week for the week of February 1, 1999. Weber became the fourth player in Texas Tech history to hit for the cycle.

== Professional career ==
Weber signed his first professional contract with the Cincinnati Reds as a non-drafted free agent in August 1999. He made his professional debut that summer with the Rookie-level Billings Mustangs of the Pioneer League, recording a .238 batting average, .365 on-base percentage (OBP) and .500 slugging percentage (SLG) with five home runs and 17 runs batted in (RBI) in 22 games. The next year, he hit .221 with a .333 OBP and .333 SLG with six home runs and 34 RBIs in 108 games for the Single-A Clinton LumberKings of the Midwest League. However, Weber was released by the Reds after the season. He felt the Reds "treated [him] like a non-prospect".

In 2001, Weber played independent league baseball for the Canton Crocodiles of the Frontier League. He batted .307 with a .382 OBP, .559 SLG, 18 home runs and 69 RBI in 84 games, being named to the Frontier League post-season All-Star team. He led the Frontier League in home runs and triples. Canton sold Weber to the Fargo-Moorhead Redhawks of the independent Northern League in 2002, where he hit .296 with a .351 OBP, .501 SLG, and 30 doubles for Fargo-Morehead, placing fourth in the league in doubles. Back with Fargo-Moorhead to open 2003, he batted .309 with a .408 OBP and .520 SLG through 52 games, as the team went on to win the Northern League championship.

However, in July 2003, the Oakland Athletics organization purchased Weber's contract from Fargo-Moorhead. With the Athletics organization, Weber hit .361 with a .394 OBP, .626 SLG, seven home runs and 48 RBIs in 35 games with the Single-A Advanced Modesto A's of the California League for the remainder of that year. In 2004, he hit .280 with a .356 OBP, .458 SLG, 15 home runs and 68 RBI in 111 games with the Double-A Midland RockHounds of the Texas League, and hit .341 with a .383 OBP, .568 SLG, two home runs and 12 RBI in 12 games with the Triple-A Sacramento River Cats of the Pacific Coast League (PCL), helping the River Cats win the PCL championship.

Weber signed with the Los Angeles Dodgers after the 2004 season as a free agent. In 2005, he hit .300 with a .369 OBP, .456 SLG, 11 home runs and 68 RBIs in 117 games with the Double-A Jacksonville Suns of the Southern League. He was ninth in the league in batting average and led the league's outfielders in assists (19) and double plays (7). With Weber, Jacksonville won the Southern League championship, his third year in a row as a member of a championship-winning team. During the season, Weber received a 15-game suspension for violating minor league baseball's drug policy. Weber, who failed a drug test administered in August 2004, said he had taken thermogin, a supplement that contained the banned substance ephedrine, and denied taking steroids.

After starting the 2006 season with the Triple-A Las Vegas Stars of the PCL, where he hit .258 with a .338 OBP, .352 SLG, 2 home runs and 31 RBI in 82 games, he was released. He signed with the Arizona Diamondbacks, where he played for the Triple-A Tucson Sidewinders of the PCL, hitting .321 with a .374 OBP, .518 SLG, 5 home runs and 27 RBI in 46 games. The Sidewinders won the PCL championship, Weber's fourth consecutive league championship.

Weber was released by the Diamondbacks during 2007 spring training. He signed with Fargo-Moorhead. After 16 games there, batting .283 with a .371 OBP and .417 SLG, his contract was sold to the Texas Rangers on June 4, 2007. The Rangers assigned him to the Single-A Advanced Bakersfield Blaze of the California League, where he hit .356 with a .416 OBP, .550 SLG, five home runs, 14 doubles, 25 RBI, and 34 runs scored in 37 games. After spending a month with the Rangers organization, on July 16, the Tampa Bay Rays purchased his contract from the Rangers and assigned him to the Triple-A Durham Bulls of the International League. There, he hit .265 with three home runs and 21 RBIs in 39 games. Weber re-signed with the Rays on a minor league contract after the 2007 season, and batted .265 with a .334 OBP, .447 SLG, 13 home runs for the Bulls in 2008.

Weber returned to the Rays' organization in 2009, almost making the Rays' opening day roster until Matt Joyce recovered from an injury. Weber returned to Durham, where he hit .302 with 14 home runs in 117 games, and led the 2009 International League with 46 doubles and finished ninth in batting average. He was named to the International League post-season All-Star team.

After the 2009 season, Weber signed with the New York Yankees organization and was invited to spring training for the 2010 season. Weber signed with the Yankees because they gave him an opportunity to compete for a job in the major leagues, while other teams told him they viewed him exclusively as a minor leaguer. In spring training, Weber led the Yankees with a .483 batting average and was presented with the James P. Dawson Award, given annually to the best rookie in the Yankees' camp. Manager Joe Girardi indicated that Weber could beat out Marcus Thames and Rule 5 draft pick Jamie Hoffmann for the fifth outfielder position on the Yankees 25 man roster, but ultimately the Yankees chose Thames, as the Yankees preferred a right-handed batter to complement their left-handed hitting outfielders, and assigned Weber to the Triple-A Scranton Wilkes-Barre Yankees. He hit .258 with no home runs in 47 games with Scranton/Wilkes-Barre before being released by the Yankees on June 3. He signed with the Detroit Tigers, reporting to the Triple-A Toledo Mud Hens of the International League. He hit .256 with a .310 OBP and .372 SLG in 21 games for Toledo. He announced his retirement on July 15, 2010.

Weber is just a tried and true professional who reminds these guys of the importance of winning every day. Not worrying about where we are in the standings, how much each game means, individual stats or getting contracts picked up, but just going out there and getting a win each and everyday no matter what -- that's what Weber does.

— Rick Forney, manager of the Winnipeg Goldeyes

On July 19, 2010, Major League Baseball announced Weber's 100-game suspension for having failed a drug test for the third time. The drug was identified as a "drug of abuse" rather than a performance-enhancing drug.

Despite announcing his retirement earlier in the year, Weber continued his career in leagues unaffiliated with MLB. He played winter league baseball in the winter of 2010–11 in the Dominican Republic, then signed with the Winnipeg Goldeyes of the American Association of Independent Professional Baseball in June when they had an injury to outfielder Jonathan Wyatt. Weber was named the team's most valuable player. Weber returned to Winnipeg for the 2012 season. After batting .281 in 78 games, the Goldeyes waived Weber, giving him his unconditional release.

== International career ==
Weber joined the United States national baseball team for the 2009 Baseball World Cup held in Nettuno, Italy in September 2009, helping the United States win the gold medal. Weber made the Cup's All-Tournament Team.

Weber has routinely played winter league baseball. Following the 2006 season, Weber played for the Naranjeros de Hermosillo of the Mexican Pacific League (MPL), appearing in the 2006 Caribbean Series. He played for the Cañeros de Los Mochis of the MPL after the 2007 season. With the Venados de Mazatlán of the MPL after the 2008 season, Weber reached the 2009 Caribbean Series. In the 2011–12 offseason, he played for the Gigantes del Cibao of the Dominican Winter League.

== Personal life ==
Weber is divorced. He has two children. Weber works in construction during his time away from baseball to help make ends meet.
