= Barbarella (festival) =

Dominican electronic music festival

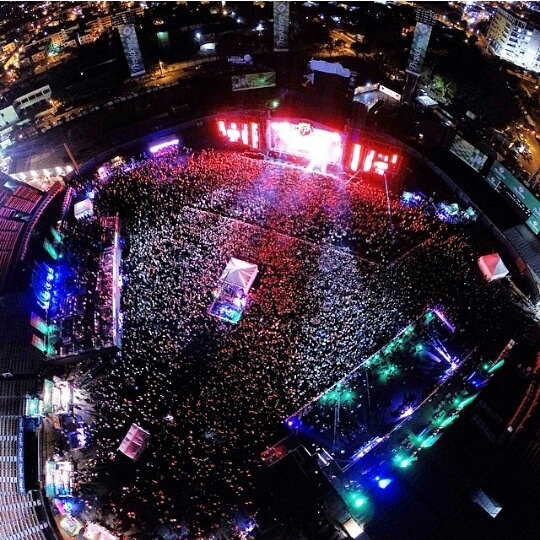
- 2014 Barbarella Festival
- Genre: EDM, house, trance, dance, electro house, drum and bass, hardstyle, dubstep
- Locations: Santo Domingo, Dominican Republic
- Years active: 2011-2016, 2018, 2025
- Attendance: 15,000 (2012) 18,000 (2013) 25,000 (2014)
- Website: Presidente Official Website

Barbarella is an annual music festival held in Santo Domingo, Dominican Republic from 2011 to 2018 / 2025 by Presidente.

== Line-Up ==
=== 2011 ===
The first Barbarella was held on June 22, 2011 at San Souci Convention Center, Santo Domingo. The lineup consisted of:

- Empire of the Sun
- Laidback Luke
- Dirty South
- Remady

=== 2012 ===
The 2012 edition of Barbarella included a bigger proposal. It was held on June 30, 2012 at San Souci Convention Center.

- Otto Knows
- Chris Lake
- Dev
- Hook N Sling
- Shawnee Taylor
- Jochen Miller
- Alex Gaudino
- Local Super Heroes

=== 2013 ===
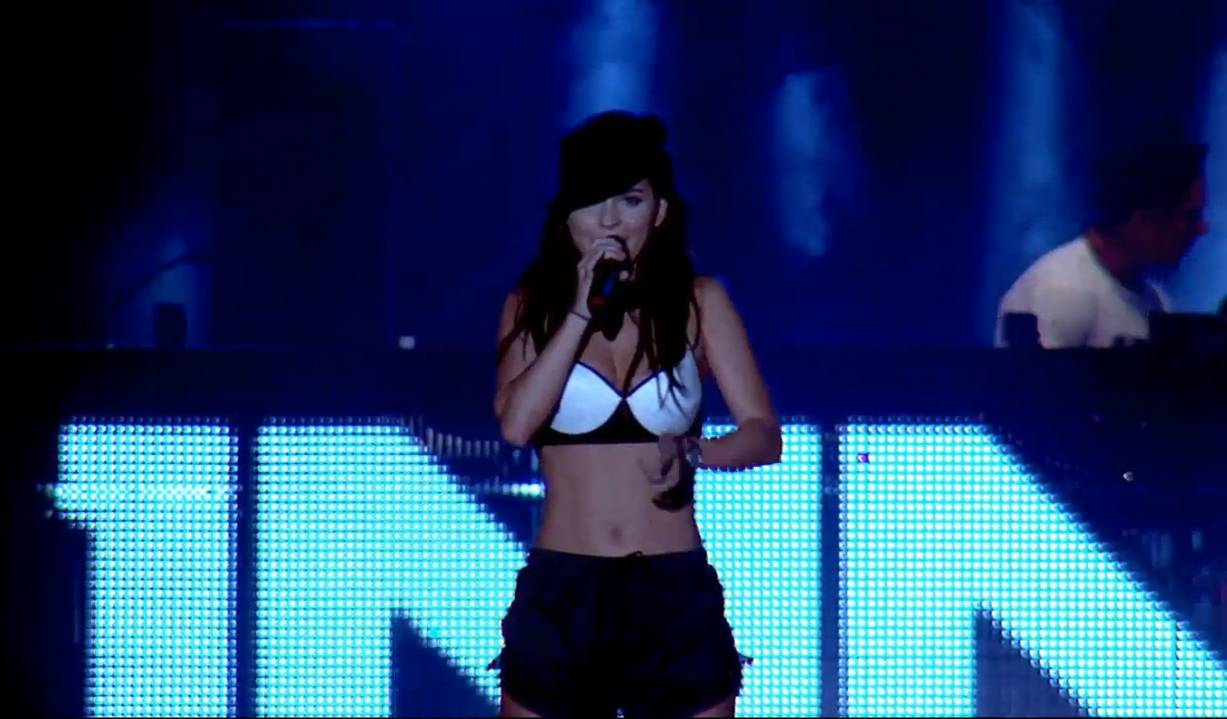
Inna at Barbarella 2013

The 2013 edition of Barbarella was held on June 28, 2013 at Estadio Quisqueya, Santo Domingo. The lineup included artists that had never been in the country before. This is the full lineup:

- Afrojack
- Dragonette
- R3hab
- Apster
- Leroy Styles
- Inna
- Emma Hewitt
- Hard Rock Sofa
- Bassjackers
- Nadia Ali
- Local Super Heroes

=== 2014 ===
The 2014 Barbarella was held on June 18, 2014 at Estadio Quisqueya, Santo Domingo. This show had a duration of 12 hours (from 6PM to 6AM). Dimitri Vegas & Like Mike, one of the most expected performers, canceled their presentation several weeks before the show. As of today, the reason of this unexpected cancellation is still unknown.

- Icona Pop
- Steve Angello
- Hardwell
- Capital Cities
- Connor Cruise
- Dyro
- NERVO
- Showtek
- Dimitri Vegas & Like Mike (canceled)
- Local Super Heroes

=== 2015 "The Journey" ===
This year Barbarella took place in the same location (Estadio Quisqueya) on June 3.

The Official Line up is:

- Deorro
- DVBBS
- Kiesza
- Krewella
- Matthew Koma
- NERVO
- Nicky Romero
- Passion Pit (Canceled)
- Robin Schulz
- Sam Feldt
- Tommy Trash
- Joseant Hidalgo (Local DJ)
- Dav Motta (Local DJ)
- Lash (Local DJ's)

=== 2016 ===
The sixth Barbarella edition took place May 25, 2016 in Estadio Quisqueya. The proposal this year was headed by French DJ David Guetta.

The Official Line up is:

- Afrojack
- Don Diablo
- David Guetta
- DJ Snake
- Jack Ü
- MAKJ
- Steve Aoki
- Emma Hewitt
- Jack Novak
- Dav Motta
- Lash
- Joseant Hidalgo
- Neff U Music
- Chael Produciendo

=== 2018 ===
The seventh edition of Barbarella Festival took place on May 30, 2018 at Estadio Olímpico Félix Sánchez. The official Line up this year is:

- Afrojack
- Axwell & Ingrosso
- The Chainsmokers
- Galantis
- Tchami X Malaa
- Showtek
- Zedd
- Andino
- Joseant Hidalgo (Local DJ)
- Kent Dow
- Mute Cake

=== 2025 ===
The eighth edition of Barbarella Festival will take place on August 30th, 2025 at Estadio Olímpico Félix Sánchez. Lineup is still unknown, but reportedly will have a blend between EDM and Urban artists.

On June 24, DJ Snake officially confirmed his appearance at Barbarella 2025 through his social media, listing “Barbarella – Santo Domingo, Dominican Republic” as part of his summer tour dates.

== See also ==
- List of electronic music festivals
