= Rafael Landestoy =

Dominican Republic baseball player (born 1953)

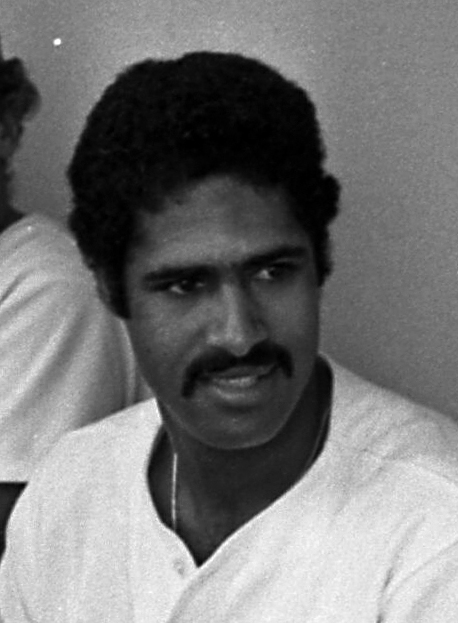
- Landestoy in 1977
- Second baseman
- Born: May 28, 1953 (age 72); Baní, Dominican Republic
- Batted: Switch Threw: Right

MLB debut
- August 27, 1977, for the Los Angeles Dodgers

Last MLB appearance
- September 30, 1984, for the Los Angeles Dodgers

MLB statistics
- Batting average: .237
- Home runs: 4
- Runs batted in: 83
- Stats at Baseball Reference

Teams
- Los Angeles Dodgers (1977); Houston Astros (1978–1981); Cincinnati Reds (1981–1983); Los Angeles Dodgers (1983–1984)

Rafael Silvaido Landestoy Santana (born May 28, 1953) is a Dominican former Major League Baseball player. Landestoy played eight major league seasons with the Houston Astros, Cincinnati Reds, and Los Angeles Dodgers. He amassed 291 hits, a .237 batting average, and four home runs, primarily as a middle infielder.

On October 10, 1984 he was released by the Los Angeles Dodgers.

Landestoy was later the manager for Tigres del Licey in the Dominican Republic.

He has been the International Field Coordinator for the New York Mets since 2008.
