= Gustavo Martínez =

Gustavo Martínez may refer to:

- Gustavo Martínez Cabañas (1911–2003), Mexican public administrator and economist
- Gustavo Martínez Frías (1935–2009), Colombian prelate of the Roman Catholic Church
- Gustavo Martínez Zuviría (1915–1991), Argentine federal interventor
- Gustavo Martínez Zuviría (1883–1962), Argentine politician and novelist who used the pen name Hugo Wast
- Gustavo Martínez (cyclist), who competed at the 1952 Summer Olympics
- Gustavo Martínez (sailor), who competed at the 2000 & 2004 Summer Olympics
