= Sebastián Valle =

Mexican baseball player (born 1990)

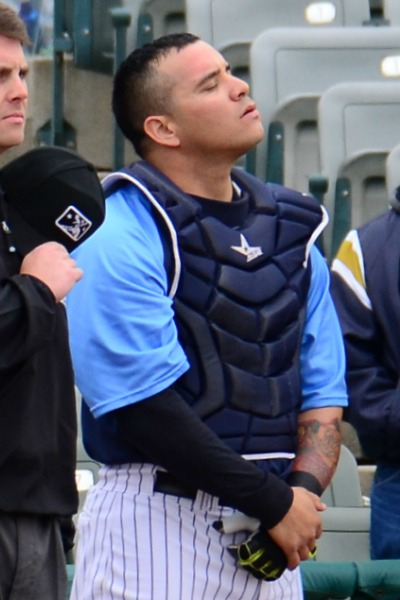
- Valle during his tenure with the Trenton Thunder, Double-A affiliates of the Yankees, in 2016
- Catcher
- Born: 24 July 1990 (age 36); Los Mochis, Sinaloa, Mexico
- Bats: Right Throws: Right
- Stats at Baseball Reference

Sebastián Valle Velásquez (born 24 July 1990) is a Mexican former professional baseball catcher. He played for the Mexico national team in the 2013 World Baseball Classic and the 2017 World Baseball Classic.

== Career ==
=== Philadelphia Phillies ===
Valle began his professional career in 2009 with the Lakewood BlueClaws of the Philadelphia Phillies organization. Valle, along with Jarred Cosart, represented the Phillies at the 2011 All-Star Futures Game.

On 18 November 2011, the Phillies added Valle to their 40-man roster to protect him from the Rule 5 draft. Valle spent the 2012 season in the minors without making a major league appearance. and did not make a major league appearance during the 2013 season as well. On 18 December 2013, Valle was designated for assignment by the Phillies in order to make room for the newly signed Roberto Hernández. He cleared waivers and was sent outright to the Triple–A Lehigh Valley IronPigs on 20 December.

The Phillies invited Valle to spring training in 2014. He made 75 appearances on the year split between Reading and Lehigh Valley, batting a combined .238/.262/.346 with five home runs and 32 RBI. Valle became a free agent following the season.

=== Pittsburgh Pirates ===
On 20 November 2014, Valle signed a minor league contract with the Pittsburgh Pirates that included an invitation to spring training. He spent the 2015 season with the Double-A Altoona Curve, playing in 70 games and hitting .279/.341/.413 with four home runs and 26 RBI. Valle elected free agency following the season on 6 November 2015.

=== New York Yankees ===
On 17 December 2015, Valle signed a minor league contract with the New York Yankees organization. He played in 68 games for the Double–A Trenton Thunder, hitting .202/.243/.303 with four home runs and 18 RBI. Valle elected free agency following the season on 7 November 2016.

=== Seattle Mariners ===
On 1 December 2016, Valle signed a minor league deal with the Seattle Mariners. Valle was invited to Spring Training for the 2017 season but did not make the club and was assigned to the Tacoma Rainiers. Valle was released by the Mariners organization on 8 July 2017.

=== Leones de Yucatán ===
On 11 July 2017, Valle was assigned to the Leones de Yucatán of the Mexican League. In 17 games for the team, he hit .277/.382/.383 with one home run and seven RBI.

He played in 34 games in his second season for the club in 2018, he batted .246/.320/.412 with five home runs and 23 RBI.

In 102 games for Yucatán in 2019 his third season with the team, Valle slashed .267/.359/.428 with 11 home runs, 70 RBI, and three stolen bases. He did not play in a game in 2020 due to the cancellation of the LMB season because of the COVID-19 pandemic. Valle returned to action in 2021 for this fourth season with the team, making 46 appearances and hitting .237/.346/.401 with five home runs and 27 RBI.

In 2022, Valle played in 75 games for Yucatán his fifth season with the team, batting .247/.321/.547 with 20 home runs and 51 RBI. Valle won the Mexican League Championship with the Leones in 2022. He made 77 appearances for the Leones in 2023 his sixth year with the team, struggling to a .183/.272/.275 batting line with five home runs and 25 RBI. In 2024, Valle played in 13 games for Yucátan his seventh season with the team, hitting .189/.250/.405 with two home runs and six RBI.

=== Saraperos de Saltillo ===
On 21 May 2024, Valle was loaned to the Saraperos de Saltillo of the Mexican League for the remainder of the season. In 26 games for the Saraperos, he hit .289/.344/.590 with seven home runs and 21 RBI. He was returned back to Yucatán following the season.

=== El Águila de Veracruz ===
On 4 December 2024, Valle was traded from Yucatán to El Águila de Veracruz of the Mexican League. In 34 appearances for Veracruz, he batted .198/.299/.287 with two home runs, 10 RBI, and one stolen base. Valle was released by the team on 29 June 2025.

=== Diablos Rojos del México ===
On 4 July 2025, Valle signed with the Diablos Rojos del México of the Mexican League. In 16 games for México, he hit .053/.182/.079 with one RBI. With the team, Valle won the Serie del Rey. He announced his retirement on 31 January 2026.
