= Chris Roberson (baseball) =

American baseball player (born 1979)

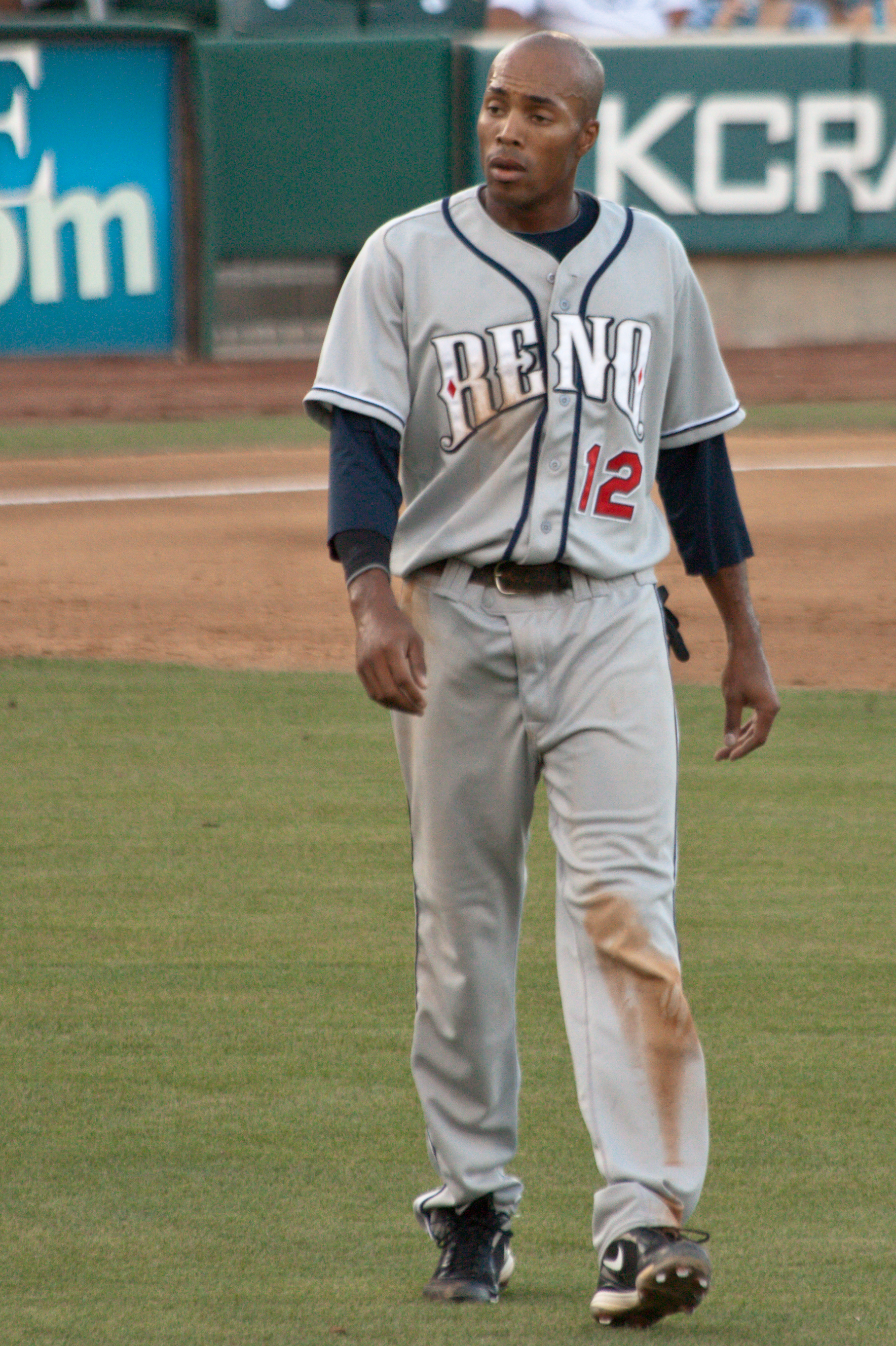
- With the Reno Aces in 2009
- Center fielder
- Born: August 23, 1979 (age 46); Oakland, California, U.S.
- Batted: Switch Threw: Right

MLB debut
- May 12, 2006, for the Philadelphia Phillies

Last MLB appearance
- September 27, 2007, for the Philadelphia Phillies

MLB statistics
- Batting average: .232
- Home runs: 0
- Runs batted in: 2
- Stats at Baseball Reference

Teams
- Philadelphia Phillies (2006–2007)

Christopher William Roberson (born August 23, 1979) is an American-born Mexican former professional baseball outfielder. He played in Major League Baseball (MLB) for the Philadelphia Phillies from 2006 to 2007. He was drafted by the Phillies in the 9th round of the 2001 MLB draft.

== Playing career ==
Roberson graduated from El Cerrito High School in El Cerrito in 1997, and attended both Contra Costa College and Feather River College. He was drafted by the Philadelphia Phillies in the 9th round of the 2001 Major League Baseball draft

=== Philadelphia Phillies ===
After graduating, Roberson played on the Clearwater Threshers, a Phillies farm team, and had a twenty-three game hit streak. Playing for the Reading Phillies, Roberson was named the 2005 Eastern League Rookie of the Year. After starting center fielder Aaron Rowand crashed into the outfield wall at Citizens Bank Park on May 11, 2006, Roberson was called up to play the center field position, along with Shane Victorino. Roberson made his major league debut on May 12, 2006, against the Cincinnati Reds.

=== Baltimore Orioles ===
Out of options, Roberson was traded to the Baltimore Orioles in January 2008 for cash. In February 2008, Roberson was assigned to the Norfolk Tides of the International League. He became a free agent at the end of the season.

=== Arizona Diamondbacks ===
In January 2009, Roberson signed a minor league contract with the Arizona Diamondbacks. After spending the 2009 season with the Reno Aces, he was again granted free agency.

=== Sultanes de Monterrey ===
In 2010, he signed with Sultanes de Monterrey of the Mexican League. While in Mexico, Roberson has also played for Liga Mexicana del Pacífico teams Naranjeros de Hermosillo and Águilas de Mexicali. He played for the club during the 2010 and 2011 campaigns.

=== Winnipeg Goldeyes ===
In 2012, he played for the Winnipeg Goldeyes in the American Association.

=== Sultanes de Monterrey (second stint) ===
Roberson joined the Sultanes de Monterrey of the Mexican League for part of the 2012 season. He played for the club in every season through 2019. He resigned with the club for the 2020 season, but did not play in a game due to the cancellation of the Mexican League season because of the COVID-19 pandemic.

=== Bravos de León ===
On February 2, 2021, Roberson was traded to the Bravos de León of the Mexican League. In 2021, he batted .289/.353/.493 with 11 home runs and 35 RBI in 51 games. In 2022, he started the season batting .363/.442/.611 with 6 home runs and 30 RBI in 30 games.

=== Acereros de Monclova ===
On May 28, 2022, Roberson was traded to the Acereros de Monclova of the Mexican League in exchange for OF Alán García, and the rights to P Alejandro Chávez (for 2022 and 2023) and P Juan Pablo Téllez (for 2022). In 48 games, he hit .288/.354/.441 with 4 home runs, 33 RBI, and 6 stolen bases. Roberson played in 45 games for Monclova in 2023, batting .268/.311/.325 with one home run, 22 RBI, and 6 stolen bases.

== Coaching career ==
On January 23, 2024, Roberson was hired by the Tampa Bay Rays to serve as a coach for their rookie–level affiliate, the Florida Complex League Rays.

In 2025, Roberson was named interim bench coach for the Charleston RiverDogs the Single-A affiliate of the Tampa Bay Rays.

In 2026, Roberson returned to his role as a coach for the FCL Rays the rookie-level affiliate of the Tampa Bay Rays.

== International career ==
He was selected for the Mexico national baseball team at the 2017 World Baseball Classic.

On March 7, 2019, he was replaced by Jesús Fabela at the 2019 exhibition games against Japan.

== Personal ==
After moving to Mexico, Roberson married Yaneth Hurtado, with whom he has two daughters and one son, and later became a citizen of the country between the 2013 and 2017 World Baseball Classics.

Roberson's father, Rick, played in the NBA for six seasons from 1969 to 1976.
