= Henry Rodríguez =

Henry Rodríguez may refer to:

- Henry Rodríguez (outfielder) (born 1967), Major League Baseball outfielder that played from 1992 to 2002
- Henry Rodríguez (pitcher) (born 1987), baseball pitcher
- Henry Rodríguez (infielder) (born 1990), baseball infielder
