= Telemicro =

Dominican television station

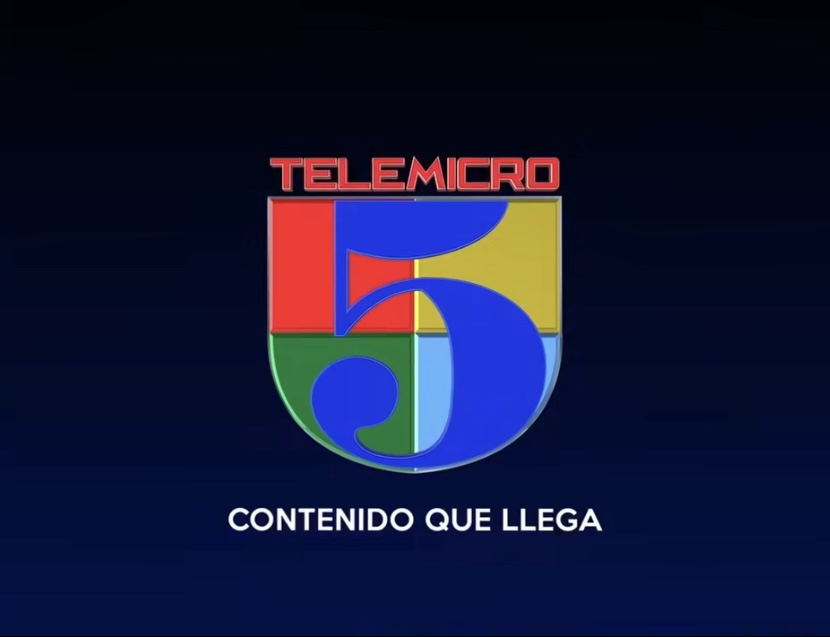
- Country: Dominican Republic
- Broadcast area: Dominican Republic; Telemicro Internacional: Americas and Europe

Programming
- Language: Spanish
- Picture format: 1080i HDTV

Ownership
- Owner: Grupo de Medios Telemicro

History
- Launched: 1986 (as Canal 6)

Links
- Website: telemicro.com.do (in Spanish)

Availability

Terrestrial
- Analog VHF/UHF: Channel 5 (Telemicro); Channel 15 (Digital 15)
- Digital VHF/UHF: Channel 5.1 (Telemicro); Channel 15.1 (Digital 15)

Telemicro (Spanish: Corporacion de Television y Microondas, English: Television and Microwave Corporation) is a television broadcast channel in the Dominican Republic which is owned by Juan Ramón Gómez Díaz under Grupo de Medios Telemicro. Telemicro has program alliances with Univision and Televisa. The slogans are Television Globalizada (Globalized Television) and Se Ve Mejor (It looks good).

== History ==
The channel started in 1986 as Canal 6 Circuito Independencia, gaining representation for the wider scope of the national population.

In July 2016, Olympusat added the international version of the channel to its OTT platform, VEMOX.

== Programming ==
- Matinal
- ¡Despierta América! (TelevisaUnivision)
- La rosa de Guadalupe (TelevisaUnivision)
- El ángel de Aurora (TelevisaUnivision)
- Corazón salvaje (TelevisaUnivision)
- Noticias Telemicro
- Teresa (TelevisaUnivision)
- El amor no tiene receta (TelevisaUnivision)
- El Gordo y la Flaca (TelevisaUnivision)
- Primer Impacto (TelevisaUnivision)
- Soy tu dueña (TelevisaUnivision)
- Fugitivas (TelevisaUnivision)
- Reyes (Record)
- Noticiero Univision (TelevisaUnivision)
- Cine Tres
- 9-1-1 (ABC)
- El Show de la Comedia
- Boca de Piano es un Show
- A reír con Miguel y Raymond
- Zona 5
- Objetivo 5
- La casa de la risa
- Misa padre Alegría
- Versión Original
- Tripletazo de películas
- Doble Cine
- Lo último
- Sala 5
