= Pedro González (baseball) =

Dominican baseball player (1937–2021)

- Second baseman
- Born: December 12, 1937; San Pedro de Macoris, Dominican Republic
- Died: January 10, 2021 (aged 83); San Pedro de Macoris, Dominican Republic
- Batted: Right Threw: Right

MLB debut
- 11 April, 1963, for the New York Yankees

Last MLB appearance
- 27 September, 1967, for the Cleveland Indians

MLB statistics
- Batting average: .244
- Home runs: 8
- Runs batted in: 70
- Stats at Baseball Reference

Teams
- New York Yankees (1963–1965); Cleveland Indians (1965–1967)

Pedro González Olivares (12 December 1937 – 10 January 2021), nicknamed "Speedy Gonzalez", was a Dominican professional baseball second baseman, who played in Major League Baseball (MLB) for the New York Yankees (1963–65) and Cleveland Indians (1965–67). He was one of the first 15 Dominicans to play big league baseball.

In 407 career MLB games, González had 264 hits with a batting average of .244, 8 home runs, and 70 runs batted in (RBI). He finished his major league career with an overall .980 fielding percentage.

The Indians acquired González on 10 May 1965 in exchange for first baseman Ray Barker.

González died on 10 January 2021.
