= 2000 Caribbean Series =

2000 baseball tournament

The forty-second edition of the Caribbean Series (Serie del Caribe) was held from February 2 through February 8 of 2000 with the champion baseball teams of the Dominican Republic, Águilas Cibaeñas; Mexico, Mayos de Navojoa; Puerto Rico, Cangrejeros de Santurce, and Venezuela, Águilas del Zulia. The format consisted of 12 games, each team facing the other teams twice, and the games were played at Estadio Quisqueya in Santo Domingo, Dominican Republic.

== Final standings ==
Country	Club	W	L	W/L %	Managers
Puerto Rico	Cangrejeros de Santurce	6	0	1.000	Mako Oliveras
Dominican Republic	Águilas Cibaeñas	4	2	.667	Tony Peña
Mexico	Mayos de Navojoa	1	5	.167	Lorenzo Bundy
Venezuela	Águilas del Zulia	1	5	.167	Marc Bombard

== Individual leaders ==
Player	Statistic
Batting
Marco Scutaro (VEN)	Batting average	.480
Tony Valentine (PUR); José Vidro (PUR)	Runs	9
José Vidro (PUR)	Hits	13
José Cruz (PUR); José Vidro (PUR)	Doubles	5
Six players tied	Triples	1
Héctor Castañeda (MEX)	Home runs	3
Héctor Castañeda (MEX); José Cruz (PUR)	RBI	10
Eduardo Pérez (PUR)	Stolen bases	3
Pitching
Stevenson Agosto (PUR)	Wins	2
Daniel Garibay (MEX)	Strikeouts	10
Stevenson Agosto (PUR); Wilson Álvarez (VEN); Miguel Batista (DOM); Luis Vizcaíno (DOM)	ERA	0.00
Wilson Álvarez	Innings pitched	13 2/3
Antonio Alfonseca (DOM)	Saves	3

== All-Star team ==
Name	Position
Héctor Castañeda (MEX)	Catcher
David Ortiz (DOM)	First baseman
Marco Scutaro (VEN)	Second baseman
Edwards Guzmán (PUR)	Third baseman
José Valentín (PUR)	Shortstop
Luis Polonia (DOM)	Left fielder
José Cruz (PUR)	Center fielder
Armando Ríos (PUR)	Right fielder
Alonzo Powell (PUR)	Designated hitter
Luis Vizcaíno (DOM)	Right-handed pitcher
Stevenson Agosto (PUR)	Left-handed pitcher
Antonio Alfonseca (DOM)	Relief pitcher
Awards
José Cruz (PUR)	Most Valuable Player
Mako Oliveras (PUR)	Manager

== Sources ==
- Bjarkman, Peter. Diamonds around the Globe: The Encyclopedia of International Baseball. Greenwood. ISBN 978-0-313-32268-6
- Serie del Caribe : History, Records and Statistics (Spanish)
- Estadísticas Serie del Caribe 2000 (Spanish)
