= Alonzo Perry =

- First baseman / Pitcher
- Born: April 14, 1923; Birmingham, Alabama, U.S.
- Died: October 13, 1982 (aged 59); Birmingham, Alabama, U.S.

Negro league baseball debut
- 1940, for the Homestead Grays

Last Mexican League appearance
- 1963, for the Sultanes de Monterrey
- Stats at Baseball Reference

Teams
- Homestead Grays (1940, 1946); Birmingham Black Barons (1947–1948, 1950); Tigres del Licey (1951–1954); Diablos Rojos del México (1955–1959); Sultanes de Monterrey (1962–1963)

Alonzo Thomas Perry (April 14, 1923 – October 13, 1982) was an American professional baseball first baseman and pitcher in the Negro leagues and in the Mexican League. He played from 1940 to 1963 with several teams.

The power hitter was indirectly responsible for the discovery of Willie Mays. Scouts sent to see Perry recognized the super talent of his younger teammate and signed both of them, assigning Perry to AAA ball. He never played an entire season at this level, and his two short stints with top level minor-league clubs were too brief to be conclusive.

While with the Barons, Perry was a teammate of Willie Mays in the late 1940s. Piper Davis, the manager, had most of the players take turns watching out for the young Mays—except for Perry and Jimmy Newberry. "No one knew what they would get into after a game. They liked the ladies and they liked their beer," Mays said. Perry was originally a pitcher, but his strong hitting resulted in him becoming an everyday player. As a pitcher for the 1948 Negro American League Champion Birmingham Black Barons, the curveballer compiled a 10–2 regular-season record and a 4.73 ERA. He was also the number one pinch hitter, and served as manager Piper Davis' lieutenant, becoming very adapt ant stealing signs. He also hit .325 in 1998 (1948 or 58?). The following year, he went 12–4 with a 3.45 ERA. In 1950, as first baseman, he posted a .313 batting avg with balanced power (14 hrs, 17 triples and 14 doubles) and started at first base for the West squad in the 1950 All-Star game, getting a couple hits in 3 at-bats. After a season with the Atlanta Black Crackers, he joined the Homestead Grays as a pitcher in 1946 and fashioned a 4–0 record before leaving the team after a disagreement with the owner about money he had won gambling. After joining the Black Barons that same season, the lanky hurler continued on the mound, but began playing more at first-base, became adept at making the stretch to catch throws from infielders, and was a natural show-boat on the field. He was also a good base runner, but was best known for his hitting ability. Perry compiled outstanding statistics playing in Mexico, where he is almost a legend. With Mexico City, he hit for averages of .375, .392, .352, .365 and .333 for the years 1955–1959, and with Monterrey in 1962–63 he posted averages on .318 and .353. In 1956 he had a career season as he led the league in hits (177), doubles (33), triples (33), home runs (28), runs (103), and RBIs (118), while batting .392 in 123 games. He also excelled in the Caribbean Leagues, including Cuba, where he was called "His Majesty," and in the Dominican Republic where he played winters during the years 1951–59. His batting avgs were .400, .327, .293, .336, .325, .252, .332 and .270, earning him the batting title in 1954 and 1957. He also led the league in home runs, twice (1952–53), in stolen bases in 1954, and he established a record by hitting safely in 32 consecutive games in 1951. Despite his success in Latin American leagues, Perry never had a chance to play in the major leagues. Some scouts said he lacked "style," but his temperament and off-field activities might have been the real reason he was not signed by MLB. After he retired from the diamond, he was in trouble with the law and may have spent some "hard time" as a result of his illegal activities.
