= Chi-Chi Olivo =

Dominican baseball player (1928–1977)

Chi-Chí Olivo
- Relief pitcher
- Born: March 28, 1928; Guayubín, Dominican Republic
- Died: February 3, 1977 (aged 48); Guayubín, Dominican Republic
- Batted: Right Threw: Right

MLB debut
- June 5, 1961, for the Milwaukee Braves

Last MLB appearance
- October 1, 1966, for the Atlanta Braves

MLB statistics
- Win–loss record: 7–6
- Earned run average: 3.96
- Strikeouts: 98
- Stats at Baseball Reference

Teams
- Milwaukee/Atlanta Braves (1961, 1964–1966)

Federico Emilio Olivo Maldonado (March 28, 1928 – February 3, 1977) was a Dominican professional baseball player who appeared in 96 games in Major League Baseball as a relief pitcher for the Milwaukee/Atlanta Braves (1961; 1964–1966). Born in Guayubín, he threw and batted right-handed, and was listed as 6 feet 2 inches (1.88 m) tall and 215 pounds (98 kg). An older brother, Diomedes, was also a major league pitcher.

== Career ==
"Chi-Chi" Olivo was 27 years old when he signed with the Milwaukee Braves prior to the 1955 season, and was 35 when he made his major league debut on June 5, 1961. He gave up a home run to the very first batter he faced, Jerry Lynch. He returned to the mound again the next day, and surrendered three earned runs in just a third of an inning.

He pitched once more three days later, but would not return to the majors for another three years. He stumbled in his first two outings of 1964, but settled down substantially from there. Over the month of July, Olivo had a 1.93 earned run average, and held opposing hitters to a .216 batting average. Both of his first two career wins came against the New York Mets on July 26 in a doubleheader at Shea Stadium. Overall, he went 2–1 with a 3.75 ERA and five saves.

After two April appearances in 1965, Olivo was demoted to the Triple-A Atlanta Crackers. He dominated the International League with a 9–2 record and 1.74 ERA to earn a call back up to Milwaukee that September. He was equally dominant, pitching 91/3 innings, and allowing just one earned run. That one run came against the Los Angeles Dodgers courtesy of a Maury Wills infield bunt single in extra innings. After reaching first, Wills stole second, and came around to score on a two out single by Lou Johnson off Dick Kelley to give Olivo his only loss on the season.

Olivo's final major league season was 1966 for the newly relocated Atlanta Braves. He went 5–4 with a 4.23 ERA and seven saves. That winter, he and outfielder Bill Robinson were dealt to the New York Yankees for third baseman Clete Boyer. He pitched one season for the Yankees' Triple-A affiliate, the Syracuse Chiefs, going 3–0 with a 1.59 ERA in nine starts.

In his 96 MLB games, all in relief, Olivo compiled a 7–6 record with 12 saves and a 3.96 career earned run average. He allowed 129 hits and 50 bases on balls, with 98 strikeouts, in 141 innings pitched.

Olivo also pitched in the Dominican Professional Baseball League for the Tigres del Licey, Aguilas Cibaeñas and Estrellas Orientales, and the Puerto Rican Professional Baseball League with the Criollos de Caguas.

Olivo was the first Major League Baseball player to die in the Dominican Republic.
