= Huascar Brazobán =

Dominican baseball player (born 1989)

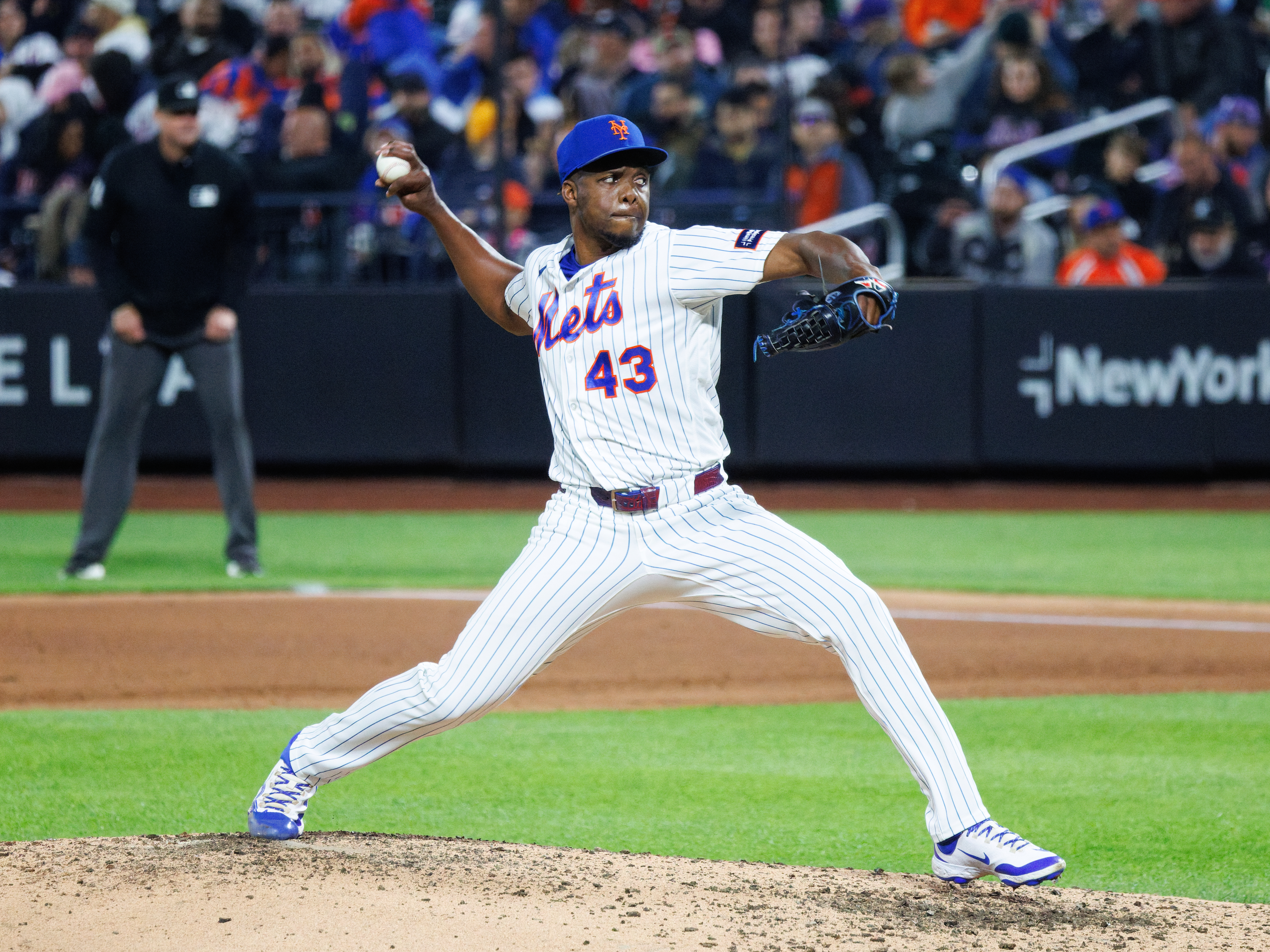
- Brazobán with the Mets in 2026

Chicago White Sox – No. 50
- Pitcher
- Born: October 15, 1989 (age 36); Villa Mella, Santo Domingo Norte, Dominican Republic
- Bats: Right Throws: Right

MLB debut
- July 24, 2022, for the Miami Marlins

MLB statistics (through 2026 season)
- Win–loss record: 18–10
- Earned run average: 3.54
- Strikeouts: 269
- Stats at Baseball Reference

Teams
- Miami Marlins (2022–2024); New York Mets (2024–2026); Chicago White Sox (2026–present)
Medals
Men's baseball
Representing Dominican Republic
World Baseball Classic
Bronze medal – third place	2026 Miami	Team

Huascar Leandro Brazobán (born October 15, 1989) is a Dominican professional baseball pitcher for the Chicago White Sox of Major League Baseball (MLB). He has previously played in MLB for the Miami Marlins and New York Mets. Brazobán signed with the Colorado Rockies as an international free agent in 2011, and made his MLB debut in 2022 with the Marlins.

== Professional career ==
=== Colorado Rockies ===
On June 23, 2011, Brazobán signed with the Colorado Rockies as an international free agent. He made his professional debut with the Dominican Summer League Rockies in 2012, making 18 appearances and registering a 3.71 ERA with 15 strikeouts and 2 saves in 17.0 innings pitched. Brazobán made 21 appearances for the Low-A Tri-City Dust Devils in 2013, struggling to a 7.78 ERA with 24 strikeouts in 19 2/3 innings of work. He split the 2014 season between Tri-City and the High-A Modesto Nuts, pitching in 23 games and logging a 3.38 ERA with 28 strikeouts in 34 2/3 innings pitched.

Brazobán missed all of 2015 with an injury, and elected free agency following the season on November 6, 2015. After being out of affiliated baseball in 2016, Brazobán re-signed with the Rockies organization on a minor league contract on November 18, 2016. In 2017, he made 37 appearances split between the High-A Lancaster JetHawks and Double-A Hartford Yard Goats, posting a cumulative 5.77 ERA with 32 strikeouts and 5 saves in 39.0 innings of work. Brazobán elected free agency following the season on November 6, 2017.

=== Lancaster Barnstormers ===
On February 12, 2018, Brazoban signed with the Lancaster Barnstormers of the Atlantic League of Professional Baseball. In 37 appearances, he posted a 1.99 ERA with 41 strikeouts and 4 saves in 40 2/3 innings pitched.

He did not play for the team in 2019, after being unable to report to the team due to visa issues. On February 5, 2020, Brazobán re-signed with the Barnstormers. He did not play in a game in 2020 due to the cancellation of the Atlantic League season because of the COVID-19 pandemic.

=== High Point Rockers ===
On March 4, 2021, Brazobán had his rights traded alongside Michael Martínez to the High Point Rockers of the Atlantic League of Professional Baseball. In 16 appearances out of the bullpen, Brazobán registered a 2.81 ERA with 16 strikeouts in 18 innings of work.

=== Miami Marlins ===
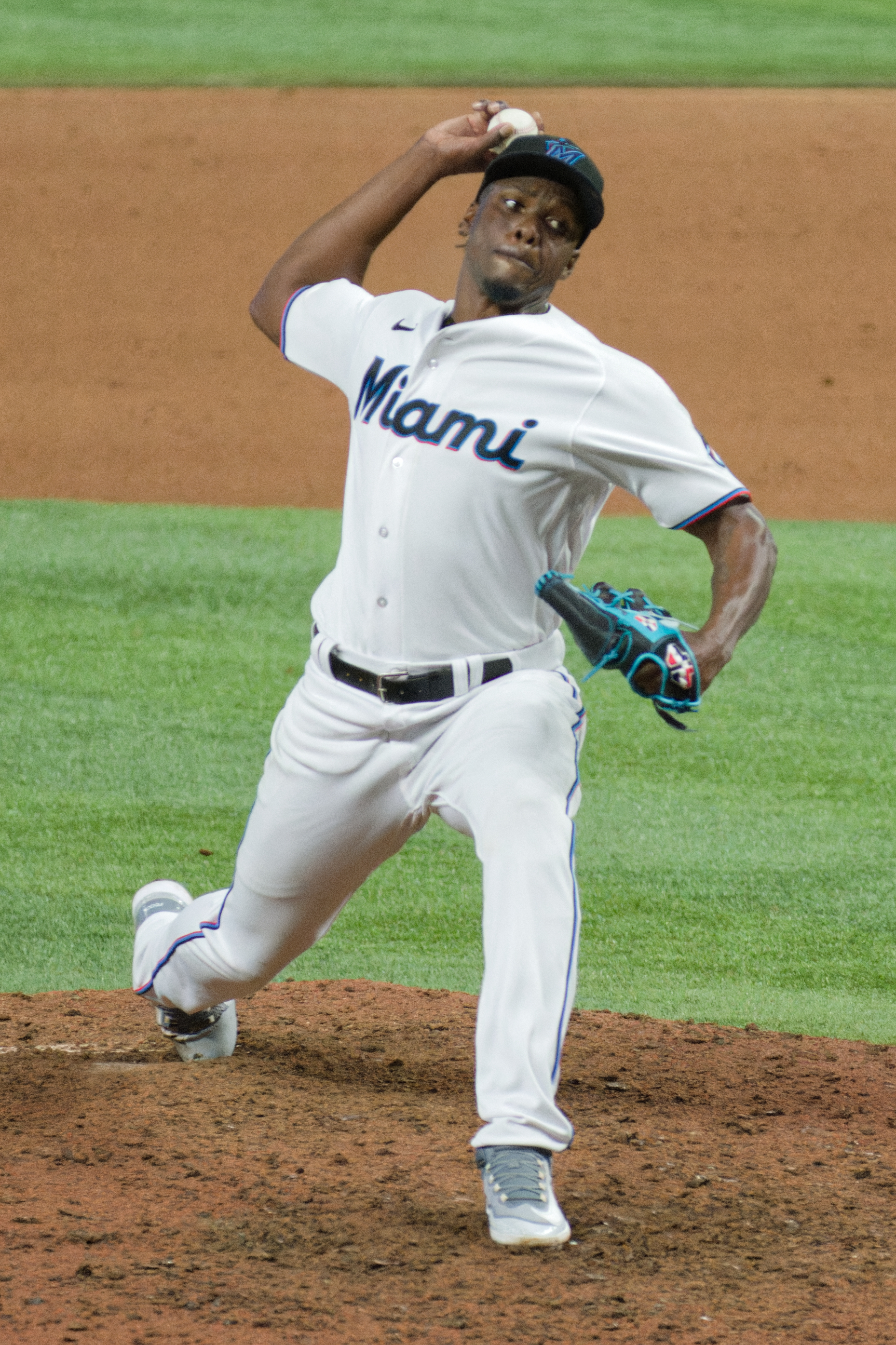
Brazobán with the Marlins in 2023

On January 4, 2022, Brazoban signed a contract with the Miami Marlins organization, where he was assigned to their Triple-A affiliate, Jacksonville Jumbo Shrimp. In 27 games, he recorded a 3.18 ERA with 59 strikeouts in 45 1/3 innings pitched. On July 24, Brazobán was selected to the 40-man roster and promoted to the major leagues for the first time. He made his MLB debut against the Pittsburgh Pirates that day at the age of 32. He threw one scoreless inning, striking out his first batter faced, Oneil Cruz. In his rookie campaign, Brazobán logged a 3.09 ERA with 40 strikeouts in 27 appearances out of the bullpen.

In 2023, Brazobán made 50 appearances out of the bullpen for Miami, registering a 4.14 ERA with 65 strikeouts across 58 2/3 innings pitched. On October 3, Brazobán made his postseason debut, throwing one hitless inning with two strikeouts during Game 1 of the 2023 NL Wild Card Series against the Philadelphia Phillies.

Brazobán missed spring training in 2024 after a visa issue prevented him from entering the United States. As a result of the issue persisting into the regular season, the Marlins placed him on the restricted list to begin the year. Brazobán was activated on May 7, 2024, and was subsequently optioned to Triple–A Jacksonville. In 20 appearances for Miami, he logged a 2.93 ERA with 34 strikeouts across 30 2/3 innings pitched.

=== New York Mets ===
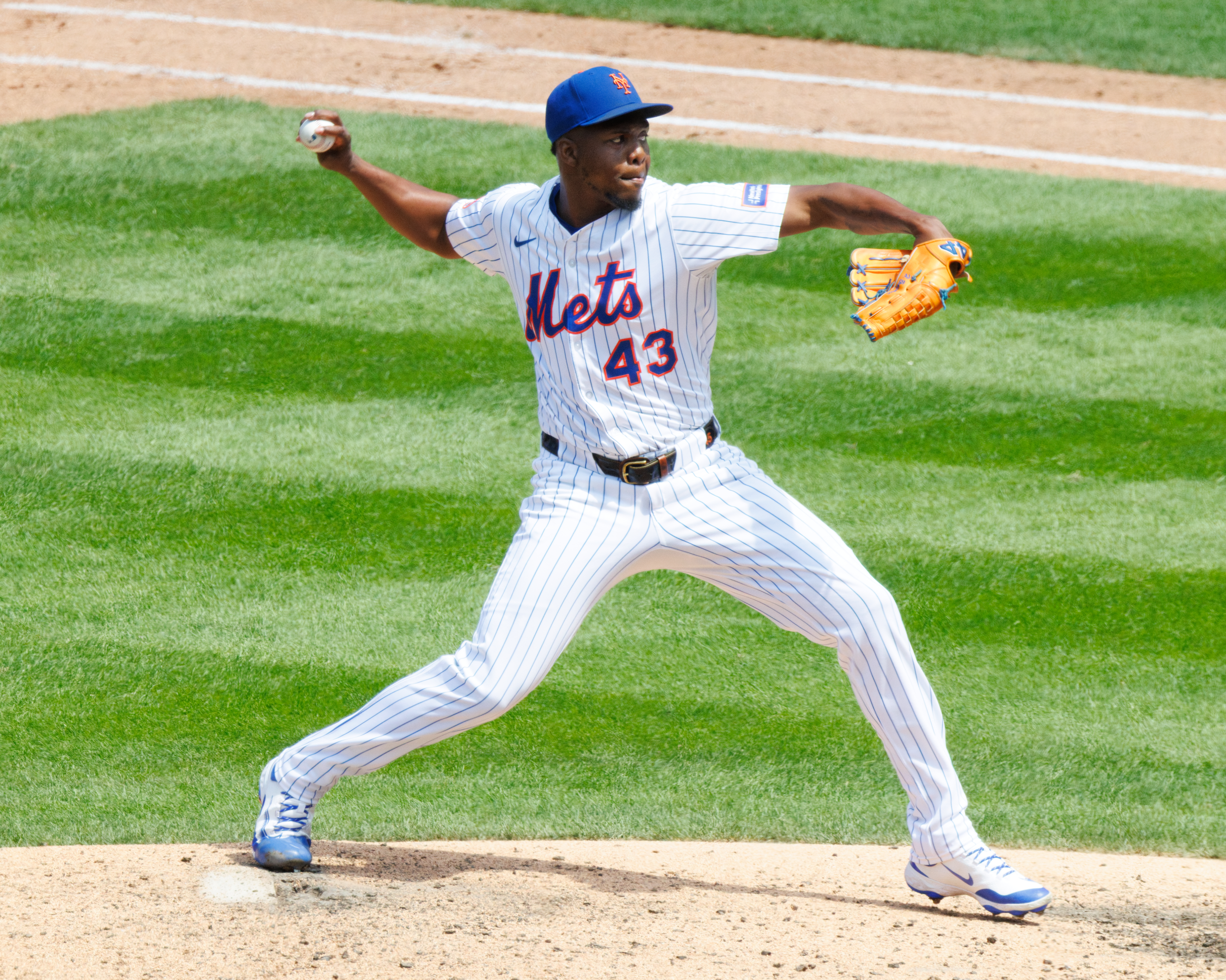
Brazobán with the Mets in 2025

On July 30, 2024, the Marlins traded Brazobán to the New York Mets in exchange for minor league infielder Wilfredo Lara. Brazobán made 19 appearances for New York in 2024, posting a 5.14 ERA with 17 strikeouts across 21 innings pitched. The Mets included Brazobán on their 2024 postseason roster, though he did not see any playing time.

On April 2, 2025, Brazobán recorded the first save of his career, after securing the last two outs in the 11th inning of a 6–5 victory against his former team, the Miami Marlins. After midseason struggles, he pitched 10 games for Triple-A Syracuse in July and August before returning to the Mets in September. Brazobán made 52 appearances for New York in 2025, posting a 5-2 record to go with a 3.57 ERA and 57 strikeouts across 63 innings pitched.

In 2026, Brazoban was very effective for the Mets, pitching to a 5–2 record and a 2.56 ERA over 52 2/3 innings, before he was acquired by the White Sox for the stretch run.

=== Chicago White Sox ===
On August 3, 2026, the Mets traded Brazobán to the Chicago White Sox in exchange for Gabe Davis and Zach Franklin. Brazobán pitched 14 1/3 innings across 14 games for the White Sox, recording a 1–0 record with a 4.40 ERA and six strikeouts.

== International career ==
Brazobán won the 2022 Dominican Championship while playing for the Gigantes del Cibao, recording a 0.46 ERA across 21 games. Due to their success, the Gigantes represented their native Dominican Republic in the 2022 Caribbean Series. He recorded an 81.00 ERA across two games. The team ultimately finished in second place to the Caimanes de Barranquilla of Colombia.

Brazobán played for the Dominican Republic national team at the 2026 World Baseball Classic (WBC). He recorded a 0.00 ERA across four innings, allowing zero hits while retiring 12 of the 13 batters he faced. Brazobán earned a bronze medal after the Dominican Republic lost to the United States in the semifinals.

== See also ==
- List of Major League Baseball players from the Dominican Republic
