= Harold Ramírez =

Colombian baseball player (born 1994)

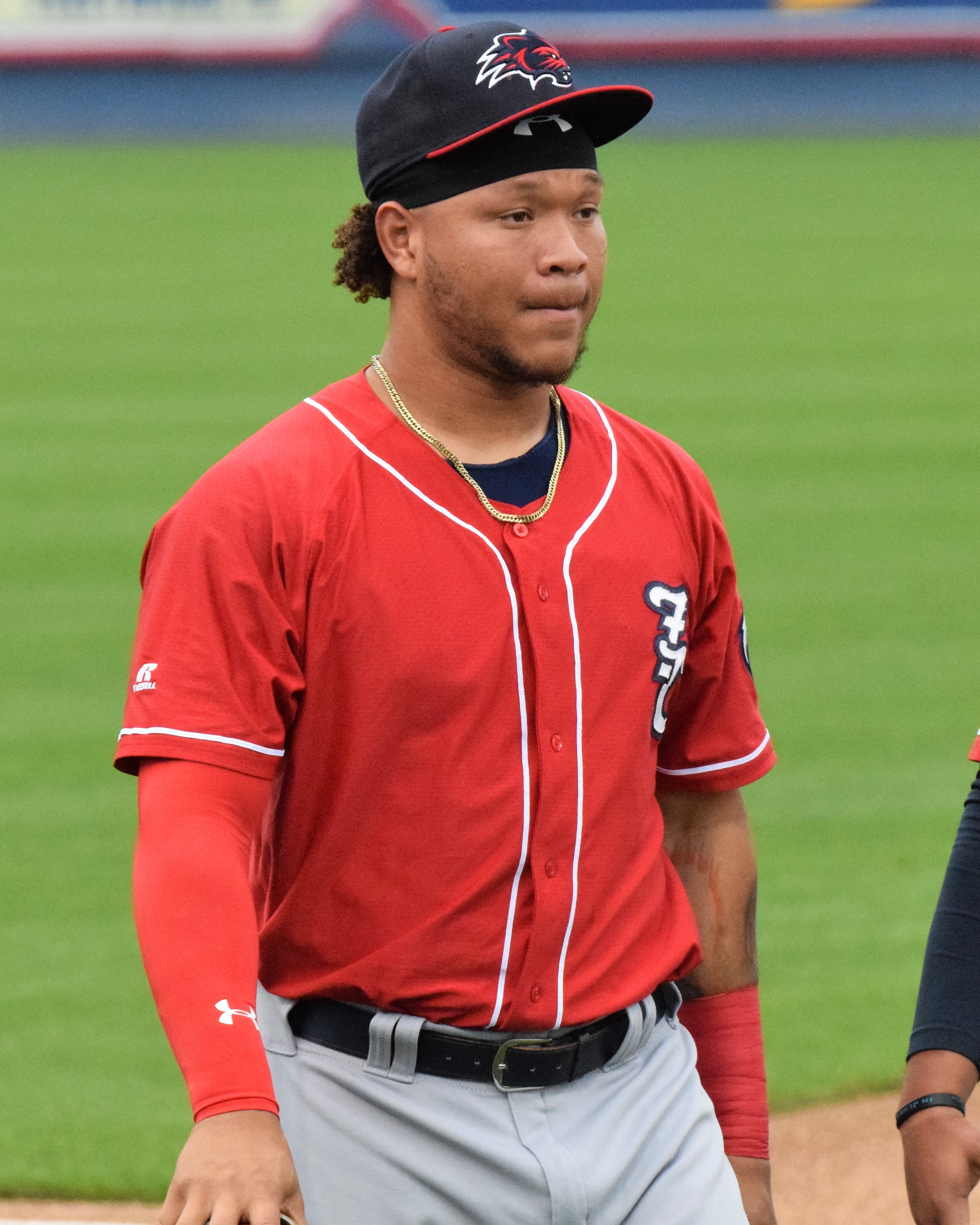
- Ramírez with the New Hampshire Fisher Cats in 2018

Sultanes de Monterrey – No. 45
- Designated hitter / Outfielder
- Born: September 6, 1994 (age 32); Cartagena, Colombia
- Bats: Right Throws: Right

MLB debut
- May 11, 2019, for the Miami Marlins

MLB statistics (through 2024 season)
- Batting average: .285
- Home runs: 38
- Runs batted in: 247
- Stats at Baseball Reference

Teams
- Miami Marlins (2019–2020); Cleveland Indians (2021); Tampa Bay Rays (2022–2024); Washington Nationals (2024)

Harold Andrés Ramírez Lemus (born September 6, 1994) is a Colombian professional baseball designated hitter and outfielder for the Sultanes de Monterrey of the Mexican League. He has previously played in Major League Baseball (MLB) for the Miami Marlins, Cleveland Indians, Tampa Bay Rays, and Washington Nationals. Ramírez also represents the Colombian national team.

== Professional career ==
=== Pittsburgh Pirates ===
Ramírez signed with the Pittsburgh Pirates as an international free agent in July 2011. He made his professional debut in 2012 with the Rookie-level Gulf Coast Pirates. In 39 games, Ramírez batted .259 with one home run and 12 RBI. In 2013, he played for the Short Season-A Jamestown Jammers, and hit .285 with five home runs, 40 RBI, and 23 stolen bases in 71 games played.

In 2014, Ramírez was promoted to the Class-A West Virginia Power, where he appeared in 49 games and batted .309 with one home run and 24 RBI. He also set the team record for longest hitting streak. Ramírez continued to make his way through the Pirates minor league system, playing the entire 2015 season with the Advanced-A Bradenton Marauders. In 80 games, he would record a .337 batting average, four home runs, 47 RBI, and 22 stolen bases. The Pirates added him to their 40-man roster after the 2015 season. In the offseason, Ramírez played 15 games with the Venados de Mazatlán of the Mexican Pacific League, and hit .245 with one home run and 5 RBI against pitchers that were, on average, over eight years older than he was. In his first season with the Double-A Altoona Curve, he was selected to play in the 2016 Eastern League All-Star Game. He had been batting .300/.355/.401 in 70 games at the time of his selection.

=== Toronto Blue Jays ===
On August 1, 2016, the Pirates traded Ramírez, along with Francisco Liriano and Reese McGuire, to the Blue Jays for Drew Hutchison. Ramírez was optioned to the Double-A New Hampshire Fisher Cats. He would play in just one game for New Hampshire before being placed on the disabled list, where he finished 2016. In 99 total games, Ramírez hit .311 with two home runs and 50 RBI. Ramírez appeared in 121 games for New Hampshire in 2017, and batted .266 with a career-high six home runs and 53 RBI. On November 20, 2017, he was outrighted off the 40-man roster. Ramírez spent 2018 with the Fisher Cats, appearing in 120 games and hitting .320 with 11 home runs and 70 RBI. He elected free agency on November 2, 2018.

=== Miami Marlins ===
On November 26, 2018, Ramírez signed a minor-league contract with the Miami Marlins.

He began 2019 with the New Orleans Baby Cakes. On May 11, his contract was selected and he was called up to the major league roster. He made his debut that night versus the New York Mets, hitting a single off Edwin Diaz for his first MLB hit.

Ramírez reached base safely in 18 of his first 19 MLB games and made starts at all three outfield positions during his rookie season. He led the team with three walk-off plays, including walk-off home runs on August 1 and 29.

Ramírez only had 10 at-bats for Miami in 2020, going 2 for 10 with two singles, two strikeouts and walk. On February 17, 2021, Ramírez was designated for assignment following the acquisition of John Curtiss.

After the 2020 season, Ramírez joined the Caimanes de Barranquilla in the Colombian Professional Baseball League. With Caimanes, his hometown team, he competed in the 2021 Caribbean Series, batting .238/.238/.333 with two doubles in 21 plate appearances.

=== Cleveland Indians ===
Ramírez was claimed off waivers by the Cleveland Indians on February 24, 2021. Over 99 games, Ramírez batted .268/.305/.398 with 7 home runs and 41 RBIs. He was designated for assignment by the newly-renamed Cleveland Guardians on November 19, 2021.

Ramírez rejoined Caimanes de Barranquilla in 2021, which again represented Colombia in the 2022 Caribbean Series. Caimanes defeated the Dominican team, Gigantes del Cibao, for the 2022 title, marking the first time a Colombian team won the tournament; Ramírez and the rest of his teammates were welcomed to the presidential palace by Colombian President Iván Duque. During the campaign, Ramírez slashed .333/.355/.400 with two doubles and three RBI.

=== Tampa Bay Rays ===
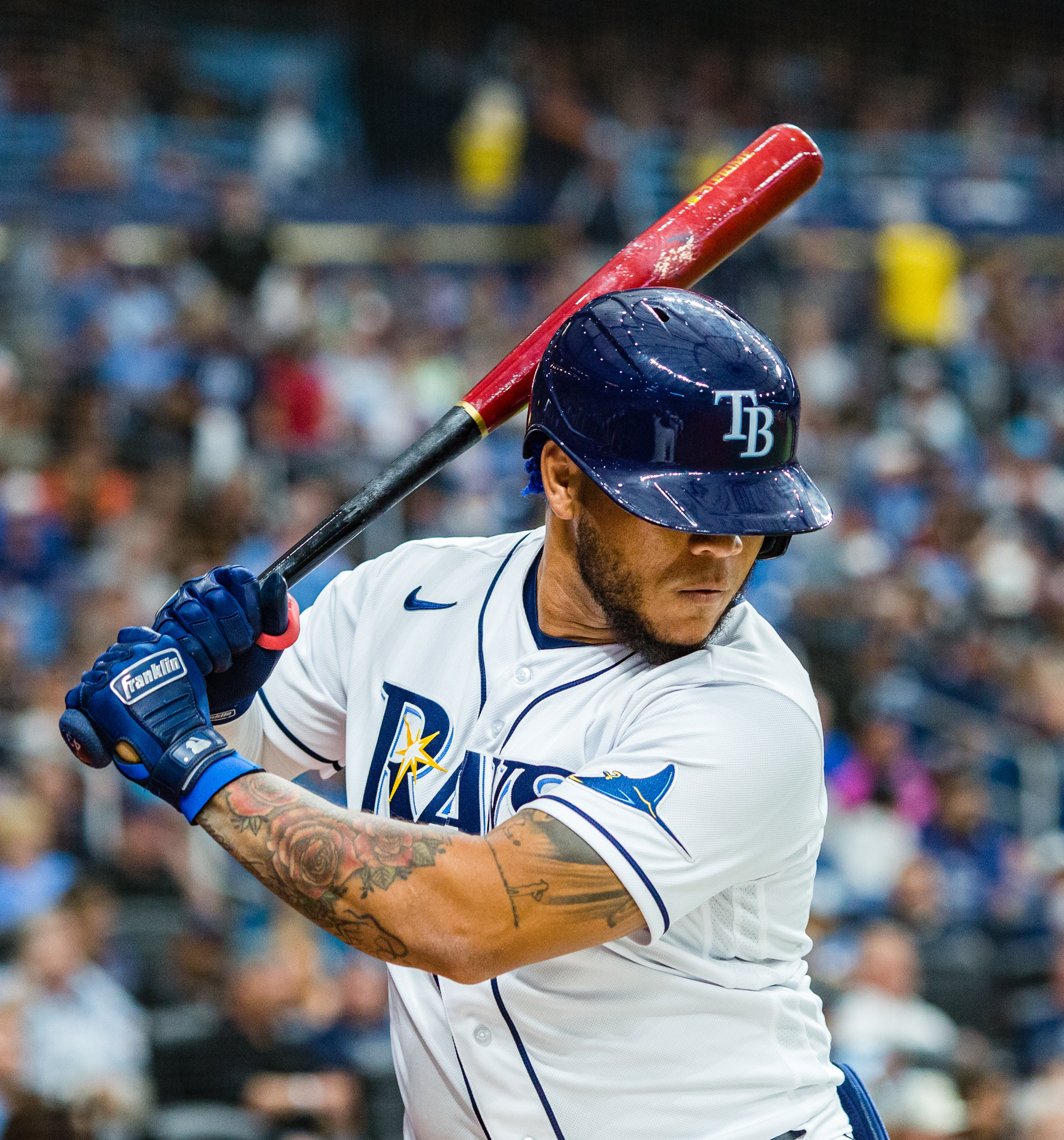
Ramírez with the Rays in 2022

Ramírez was traded to the Chicago Cubs on November 22, 2021, in exchange for cash considerations. On March 25, 2022, Ramírez was traded to the Tampa Bay Rays in exchange for Esteban Quiroz. For much of the 2022 season, he was a contender for the batting title in the American League. Ramírez was hitting .329 through July 17, when a pitch from the Baltimore Orioles’ Jordan Lyles fractured his right thumb and caused him to miss four weeks. He ended the season with a slash line of .300/.343/.404, leading the team in batting average, and his 58 RBI for the Rays were second only to Randy Arozarena.

Ramírez's salary for the 2023 season was determined by the arbitration process to be $2.2 million. Over 122 games, he slashed .313/.353/.460 with a 125 OPS+. During the offseason, he returned to Colombia with the Caimanes de Barranquilla and also played for the Venezuelan league champion Tiburones de La Guaira.

Ramírez played in 48 games for the Rays in 2024, hitting .268/.284/.305 with one home run, 13 RBI, and five stolen bases. On June 7, Ramírez was designated for assignment by Tampa Bay. He was released by the Rays on June 13.

=== Washington Nationals ===
On June 15, 2024, Ramírez signed a minor league contract with the Washington Nationals. In 7 games for the Triple–A Rochester Red Wings, he went 9–for–24 (.375) with 4 RBI. On June 24, the Nationals selected Ramírez's contract, adding him to the active roster. In 25 games for the Nationals, he hit .243/.273/.365 with one home run and 16 RBI. Ramírez was designated for assignment by the Nationals on August 13. He was released by the Nationals organization on the next day.

=== Atlanta Braves ===
On August 23, 2024, Ramírez signed a minor league contract with the Atlanta Braves organization. In 22 appearances for the Triple-A Gwinnett Stripers, he batted .231/.278/.275 with nine RBI and two stolen bases. Ramírez elected free agency following the season on November 4.

=== Tecolotes de los Dos Laredos ===
On February 24, 2025, Ramírez signed with the Tecolotes de los Dos Laredos of the Mexican League. In 93 games, he hit .359/.412/.496 with nine home runs, 51 RBI, and 30 stolen bases.

Ramírez made 66 appearances for the Tecolotes in 2026, he slashed .350/.381/.460 with four home runs, 40 RBI, and 13 stolen bases.

=== Sultanes de Monterrey ===
On July 6, 2026, Ramírez and Daniel Mengden were traded to the Sultanes de Monterrey of the Mexican League.

== International career ==
Ramírez represents Colombia in international competition. In the 2023 World Baseball Classic, he slashed .133/.188/.133, with two hits and a walk over 16 plate appearances. At the 2026 World Baseball Classic qualifiers, held in March 2025 in Tucson, Arizona, Ramírez registered three hits in 13 at-bats, hitting .231 with two RBI as Colombia requalified to the WBC undefeated.

== Personal life ==
Ramírez has two sons born in October 2016 and in 2020. They live with his ex-wife, Adriana, in Miami. His eldest son has autism spectrum disorder, inspiring Ramírez to dye his hair blue, the color of autism awareness. Ramírez also has a tattoo on his hand in honor of his son with a puzzle piece (a symbol of the autistic community) and a message that reads "It's okay to be different."
