= Dominican Summer League Pirates =

Dominican Summer Pirates
- Founded in 1990; Boca Chica; Boca Chica, Dominican Republic

Minor league affiliations
- Class: Class Foreign Rookie League
- League: Dominican Summer League (1990-present)
- Division: Southwest Division (Black); Central Division (Gold)

Major league affiliations
- Team: Pittsburgh Pirates (1990-present)

Minor league titles
- League titles (3): 1990; 2003; 2012
- Division titles (4): 2003; 2006; 2007; 2012

Team data
- Name: DSL Pirates Black & Gold (2021–present); DSL Pirates 1 & 2 (2018–2020); DSL Pirates (2014–2017); DSL Pirates 1 (2012–2013); DSL Pirates (1990–2011)
- Ballpark: Pirates Academy
- Owner/ Operator: Pittsburgh Pirates
- Manager: Joel Fuentes (Black); José Mosquera (Gold)

The Dominican Summer Pirates are a minor league baseball team in the Dominican Summer League. Also known as the DSL Pirates, they play in Boca Chica, Dominican Republic, are affiliated with the Pittsburgh Pirates. The Pirates operate two DSL teams: the DSL Pirates Black and DSL Pirates Gold.

== History ==
Past players include Aramis Ramírez, José Guillén and Ronny Paulino. The club was known as the Dominican Summer League Pirates 1, or DSL Pirates 1, between 2012 and 2013, when the Venezuelan Summer Pirates were relocated to the Dominican Republic to become the Dominican Summer League Pirates 2. In 2014, the Pirates returned to fielding one DSL team, and the team became known once again as the DSL Pirates.

== Roster ==
Dominican Summer League Pirates Black roster
Players	Coaches/Other
Pitchers: 58 Welin Aponte; 85 Eydan Fermin; 81 Fernando Figuera; 78 Dariel Florentino; 75 Justino Francisco; 86 Angel Herrera; 46 Juan Muniz; 83 Leudy Reyes; 68 Maickol Reyes; 50 Angel Rosado; 49 Yeraldo Salcedo; 73 Hamlet Santos; 74 Robinson Smith; 57 Yhosneiber Torres; 51 Albert Vega; Catchers: 10 Javier Acevedo; 37 Yadier Crespo; 43 Victor Familia; 12 Victor Marquez; Infielders: 7 Adbiel Feliz; 6 Hyun Seung Lee; 28 Yoander Santana; Outfielders: 2 Luis Cruz; 34 Limanol Payero; 29 Hanley Ramirez; 30 Edgar Walker	Manager: -- Joel Fuentes; Coaches: -- David Perez (pitching); -- Luis Perez (hitting); -- Gustavo Polanco (catching); -- Joaquin Murrietta (coach); -- Angel Suero (coach); 60-day injured list: 84 Jeremia Berroa; 7-day injured list; * On Pittsburgh Pirates 40-man roster; ~ Development list; # Rehab assignment; ∞ Reserve list; ‡ Restricted list; § Suspended list; † Temporarily inactive list; Roster updated August 25, 2025; Transactions; → More rosters: MiLB • Dominican Summer League

Dominican Summer League Pirates Gold roster
Players	Coaches/Other
Pitchers: 70 Keuri Almonte; 89 Adrian Aray; 59 Mauricio De La Cruz; 77 Claudio Estelie; 47 Yonleg Gaetano; 48 Tony Gonzalez; 61 Yoslaniel Hernandez; 76 Wifrailyn Jaquez; 79 Carlos Lorenzo §; 55 Yeison Martinez; 91 Dariel Miguel; 82 Raimi Mueses; 94 Roilan Portuondo; 64 Marlon Quintana; 67 Darwin Roa; 60 Alejandro Rondon; 71 Jose Rondon; 97 Jose Sequera; -- Angel Soriano; 53 Victor Trejo; 63 Stainer Valdez; Catchers: 14 Jesus Lizardo; 17 Angel Perez; Infielders: 5 Johan De Los Santos; 30 Yosmar Gimenez; 15 Jayden Kim; 35 Frankeli Mesta; 32 Darell Morel; 38 Armstrong Muhoozi §; 24 Fredderick Ovalle; 23 Antonio Pimentel; Outfielders: 25 Iverson Allen; 16 Andres Villafane §; 31 Phillando Williams	Manager: -- José Mosquera; Coaches: -- Ronny Agustin (coach); -- Cecilio Beltre (coach); -- Jose Cueto (pitching); -- Joaquin Murrieta (coach); -- Leo Perez (catching); -- Raul Siri (hitting); -- Khelyn Smith (performance); 60-day injured list: 18 Gabriel Rodriguez; 7-day injured list; * On Pittsburgh Pirates 40-man roster; ~ Development list; # Rehab assignment; ∞ Reserve list; ‡ Restricted list; § Suspended list; † Temporarily inactive list; Roster updated September 29, 2025; Transactions; → More rosters: MiLB • Dominican Summer League

== Season-by-season ==
Year	Record	Win–loss %	Manager	Regular season finish	Playoffs
1990	48-22	.686	--	1st Round Robin	League Champs
1991	36-33	.522	--	--	
1992	38-31	.551	Hall Dyer	3rd Santo Domingo West	
1993	39-29	.567	Hall Dyer	--- Santo Domingo West	
1994	27-39	.409	Felix Feliz	3rd Santo Domingo West	
1995	30-36	.455	Ramon Sambo	4th Santo Domingo West	
1996	25-46	.352	Ramon Sambo	6th Santo Domingo West	
1997	29-40	.420	Ramon Zapata	--- Santo Domingo West	
1998	23-49	.319	Ramon Zapata	--- Santo Domingo West	
1999	34-36	.486	Ramon Zapata	--- Santo Domingo West	
2000	39-31	.557	Ramon Zapata	--- San Pedro	
2001	27-43	.386	Ramon Zapata	--- San Pedro de Macoris	
2002	36-36	.500	Ramon Zapata	--- San Pedro de Macoris	
2003	39-25	.609	Ramon Zapata	1st San Pedro San Pedro de Macoris	League Champs
2004	26-44	.371	Ramon Zapata	--- San Pedro de Macoris	
2005	38-34	.528	Ramon Zapata	3rd San Pedro San Pedro de Macoris	
2006	48-19	.761	Ramon Zapata	1st San Pedro San Pedro de Macoris	Lost in 2nd round
2007	52-17	.754	Ramon Zapata	1st San Pedro San Pedro de Macoris	Lost in 2nd round
2008	40-30	.571	Ramon Zapata	3rd San Pedro	
2009	29-38	.433	Ramon Zapata	8th Boca Chica North	
2010	37-34	.521	Ramon Zapata	4th Boca Chica North	
2011	41-30	.577	Ramon Zapata	3rd Boca Chica North	
2012	44-26	.629	Gerardo Alvarez	(t)1st Boca Chica North	League Champs
2013	40-31	.521	Gerardo Alvarez	3rd Boca Chica North	
2014	34-36	.486	Gerardo Alvarez	5th Boca Chica North	
2015	30-42	.417	Mendy Lopez	8th Boca Chica North	
2016	27-42	.391	Mendy Lopez	5th Boca Chica North	
2017	36-34	.514	Kieran Mattison	5th DSL North	
