= Tsung-Che Cheng =

Taiwanese baseball player (born 2001)

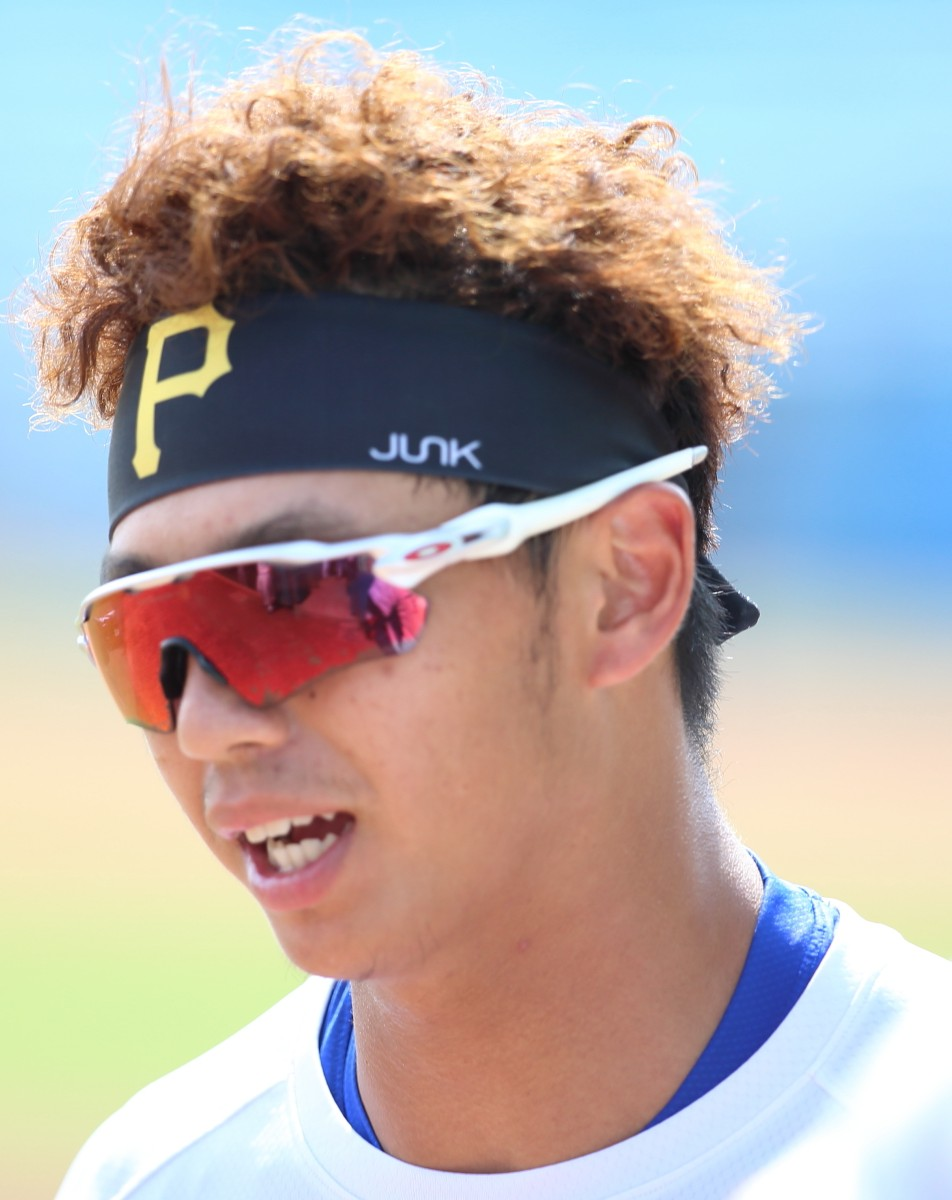
- Cheng in 2020

Detroit Tigers
- Shortstop / Second baseman
- Born: July 26, 2001 (age 25); Pingtung County, Taiwan
- Bats: Left Throws: Right

MLB debut
- April 9, 2025, for the Pittsburgh Pirates

MLB statistics (through 2026 season)
- Batting average: .217
- Home runs: 0
- Runs batted in: 5
- Stats at Baseball Reference

Teams
- Pittsburgh Pirates (2025); Boston Red Sox (2026)
Medals
Men's baseball
Representing Chinese Taipei
U-18 Baseball World Cup
Gold medal – first place	2019 Gijang	Team
Asian Games
Silver medal – second place	2022 Hangzhou	Team

Tsung-Che Cheng (Chinese: 鄭宗哲; pinyin: Zhèng Zōngzhé; born July 26, 2001) is a Taiwanese professional baseball infielder for the Detroit Tigers of Major League Baseball (MLB). He previously played for the Pittsburgh Pirates and Boston Red Sox. He signed with the Pirates as an international free agent in 2019 and made his MLB debut in 2025.

== Early life ==
Cheng was raised in Jiuru, Pingtung County, Taiwan, the younger of two sons born to a truck driver and homemaker. He began playing baseball around the age of five, and, inspired by Chien-Ming Wang, originally intended to become a pitcher.

== Professional career ==
=== Pittsburgh Pirates ===
Cheng signed with the Pittsburgh Pirates out of Pu-Men High School as an international free agent on July 2, 2019, for a signing bonus of $380,000. He did not play in a game in 2020 due to the cancellation of the minor league season because of the COVID-19 pandemic.

Cheng made his professional debut with the Florida Complex League Pirates in 2021, and played second base, third base, and shortstop throughout the season. After the 2021 minor league season ended, Cheng played winter ball with the Caimanes de Barranquilla, winning the 2022 Caribbean Series.

Cheng spent the 2022 Minor League Baseball season with the Bradenton Marauders, playing shortstop more frequently. He appeared in 104 games, hit for a .270 batting average, .376 on-base percentage, and a .794 on-base plus slugging percentage, while scoring 79 runs. Of his 38 extra-base hits, seven were triples. He led the Florida State League in triples and runs scored, finished second in on-base percentage, fourth in batting average, and fifth in on-base plus slugging percentage. Cheng's 33 stolen bases in 39 attempts led all minor leaguers within the Pirates organization. At the end of the 2022 minor league season, Cheng was assigned to the Gigantes de Carolina of the Puerto Rican Professional Baseball League.

At the start of the 2023 regular season, Cheng ranked thirtieth on MLB Pipeline's list of top Pirates prospects and was assigned to the Greensboro Grasshoppers. On June 23, he played his first game at the Double-A level, with the Altoona Curve. During the season, Cheng set a career high in triples and was ranked by MLB Pipeline as the twenty-second best Pirates prospect.

On November 14, 2023, the Pirates added Cheng to their 40-man roster to protect him from the Rule 5 draft. Before the 2024 season, MLB Pipeline ranked him the 17th-best Pirates prospect. Cheng was optioned to Double-A Altoona to begin the year. In 126 appearances for the Curve, he slashed .218/.320/.341 with 11 home runs, 54 RBI, and 16 stolen bases. On September 17, the Pirates promoted Cheng to the Triple-A Indianapolis Indians.

Cheng was optioned to Triple-A Indianapolis to begin the 2025 season. On April 7, he was promoted to the major leagues when Jared Triolo was injured. On April 9, Cheng made his major league debut against the St. Louis Cardinals, becoming the 18th MLB player from Taiwan. He made three appearances for Pittsburgh during his rookie campaign, going 0-for-7 with three strikeouts. Cheng was designated for assignment by the Pirates on December 19.

=== Boston Red Sox ===
On January 8, 2026, Cheng was claimed off waivers by the Tampa Bay Rays. He was designated for assignment by the Rays on January 12. On January 16, Cheng was claimed off waivers by the New York Mets, who designated him for assignment on January 21. On January 28, he was claimed off of waivers by the Washington Nationals. After the Nationals acquired George Soriano on January 30, Cheng was designated for assignment. On February 6, he was claimed off of waivers again, this time by the Boston Red Sox. He was optioned to the Triple-A Worcester Red Sox to begin the regular season. Cheng hit for the cycle, the first in Worcester Red Sox history, on April 10. On June 26, Cheng was promoted to the major-league Red Sox and recorded his first major league hit (a double), first RBI, and first walk against the New York Yankees. At the major league level, Cheng recorded ten hits and five RBIs in 14 games, for a .256 batting average. In the minors, Cheng hit eight home runs with a .241 batting average, 30 RBIs, and a .735 OPS.

=== Detroit Tigers ===
On October 29, he was traded to the Detroit Tigers in exchange for cash considerations.

== International career ==
Shortly after signing with the Pittsburgh Pirates, Cheng competed in the 2019 U-18 Baseball World Cup. Cheng was named to the Taiwanese national team roster for the 2023 World Baseball Classic. Over the course of the tournament, he batted for a .333 (5-for-15) batting average as a leadoff hitter and drove in three runs. Later that year, Cheng appeared in the postponed 2022 Asian Games, competing in five baseball games, batting .318/.455/.348 in 22 at-bats, and winning a silver medal with Taiwan.

Cheng was named to Taiwan's preliminary roster for the World Baseball Classic 2025 Qualifiers, but later withdrew. Cheng was selected to play in the 2026 World Baseball Classic. In the third game of the tournament, Cheng and teammate Stuart Fairchild each stole three bases, contributing to a single-game national team record of eight steals. With the conclusion of the 2026 WBC, Cheng led the tournament in steals, with four stolen bases.

== Personal life ==
Cheng is known by the nickname "Z" because the pinyin of the three Chinese characters in his name, Zhèng Zōng Zhé, all start with the letter Z. The actual romanization of his name uses the Wade–Giles system.

Cheng is married to Irene. The couple met in elementary school and started dating after high school.

== See also ==
- List of Major League Baseball players from Taiwan
