= Carlos De La Cruz (baseball) =

American baseball player (born 1999)

- De La Cruz with the Reading Fightin Phils in 2023

Charleston Dirty Birds – No. 45
- Outfielder
- Born: October 6, 1999 (age 27); Yonkers, New York, U.S.
- Bats: Right Throws: Right
- Stats at Baseball Reference

Carlos De La Cruz (born October 6, 1999) is an American professional baseball outfielder for the Charleston Dirty Birds of the Atlantic League of Professional Baseball.

== Career ==
=== Philadelphia Phillies ===
De La Cruz was originally discovered by the scouting department of the Philadelphia Phillies in 2017 at the age of 17 playing for an amateur travel team in New York. He would sign with the Phillies on August 23, 2017 for a bonus of $50,000 as an undrafted free agent before participating in the Florida Instructional League later in the year.

De La Cruz made his professional debut in 2018 with the Rookie-level Gulf Coast League Phillies East of the Gulf Coast League. He finished the season with a .284 average and six home runs in 43 games. De La Cruz was promoted to the Lakewood BlueClaws of the Single–A South Atlantic League for the 2019 season. He finished the season with a .220 average and seven home runs in 117 games. De La Cruz did not play in a game in 2020 due to the cancellation of the Minor League Baseball season because of the COVID-19 pandemic. De La Cruz shuttled between the FCL Phillies, Jersey Shore BlueClaws, and Clearwater Threshers, playing in 63 total games and hitting .181. De La Cruz started the 2022 season at Jersey Shore. After slashing .266/.344/.463 over 64 games, he was promoted to the Reading Fightin Phils of the Double-A Eastern League. In 38 contests with Reading, De La Cruz hit .278 and finished the season with 17 home runs. After the 2022 season, he played in the Arizona Fall League. He was also named a MiLB.com Organization All-Star.

De La Cruz returned to Reading for the 2023 season, finishing with a .259 average and 24 home runs in 129 contests. He was also named an Eastern League Post-Season All-Star. Following the season, De La Cruz played for the Gigantes del Cibao of the Dominican Winter League. He would return to Reading for the start of the 2024 season; in 113 appearances split between Reading and the Triple-A Lehigh Valley IronPigs, he hit a cumulative .234/.302/.367 with 11 home runs, 53 RBI, and six stolen bases. De La Cruz elected free agency following the season on November 4, 2024.

=== Washington Nationals ===
On December 18, 2024, De La Cruz signed a minor league contract with the Washington Nationals organization. In 2025, he made 117 appearances split between the Double-A Harrisburg Senators and Triple-A Rochester Red Wings, hitting a cumulative .221/.286/.387 with 13 home runs, 57 RBI, and 12 stolen bases. De La Cruz elected free agency following the season on November 6, 2025.

=== Charleston Dirty Birds ===
On May 10, 2026, De La Cruz signed with the Charleston Dirty Birds of the Atlantic League of Professional Baseball.
