= Luis Escobar (baseball) =

Colombian baseball player (born 1996)

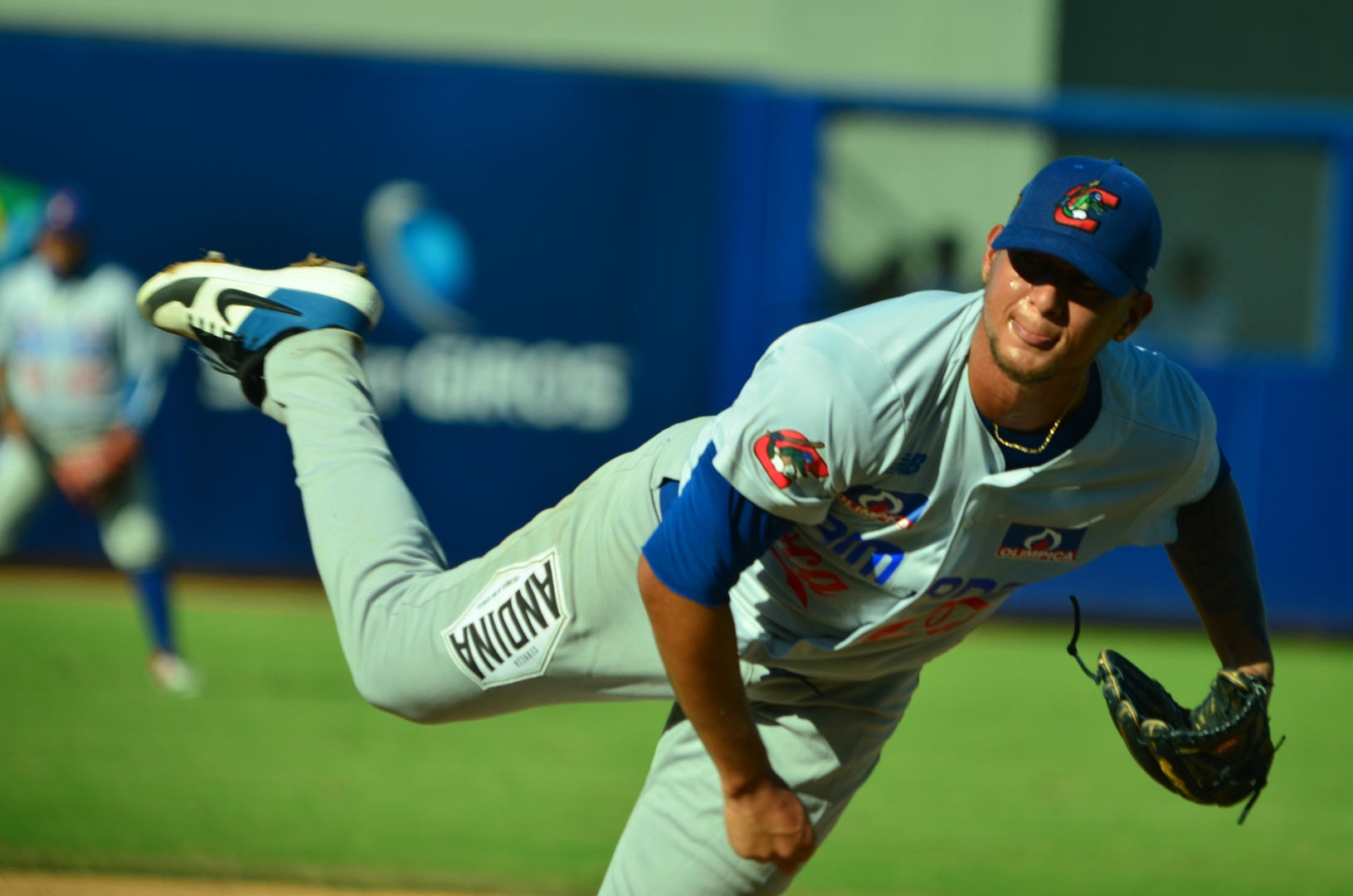
- Luis Escobar with Caimanes de Barranquilla in 2021
- Pitcher
- Born: May 30, 1996 (age 30); Cartagena, Colombia
- Batted: Right Threw: Right

MLB debut
- July 13, 2019, for the Pittsburgh Pirates

Last MLB appearance
- July 24, 2019, for the Pittsburgh Pirates

MLB statistics
- Win–loss record: 0–0
- Earned run average: 7.94
- Strikeouts: 2
- Stats at Baseball Reference

Teams
- Pittsburgh Pirates (2019)

Luis Alberto Escobar Hernandez (born May 30, 1996) is a Colombian former professional baseball pitcher. He played in Major League Baseball (MLB) for the Pittsburgh Pirates.

== Professional career ==
=== Pittsburgh Pirates ===
Escobar signed with the Pittsburgh Pirates as an international free agent in July 2013. He made his professional debut in 2014 for the DSL Pirates and spent the whole season there, posting a 2–4 record and a 4.75 ERA in 13 games started. In 2015, he played for both the GCL Pirates and the West Virginia Black Bears, pitching to a combined 2–1 record, 3.83 ERA, and a 1.13 WHIP in 13 starts, and in 2016, he returned to the Black Bears, posting a 6–5 record and 2.93 ERA in 15 games (12 starts).

Escobar represented the Pirates in the 2017 All-Star Futures Game. He spent the 2017 season with the West Virginia Power where he posted a 10–7 record and a 3.83 ERA with 168 strikeouts in 131.2 innings pitched (26 games, 25 starts). On November 20, 2017, the Pirates added Escobar to their 40-man roster to protect him from the Rule 5 draft. He split the 2018 season between the Bradenton Marauders and the Altoona Curve, going a combined 11–6 with a 4.14 in 127 innings. He opened the 2019 season with Bradenton, before being promoted to the Indianapolis Indians on May 9.

On July 6, 2019, the Pirates promoted Escobar to the major leagues. He made his major league debut on July 13, striking out one batter over two scoreless innings in relief. Escobar was designated for assignment on November 20, 2019, and outrighted to Triple–A on November 27.

Escobar did not play in a game for the Pirates organization in 2020 due to the cancellation of the minor league season because of the COVID-19 pandemic. He was released by Pittsburgh on June 9, 2020.

=== Olmecas de Tabasco ===
On April 22, 2021, Escobar signed with the Olmecas de Tabasco of the Mexican League. In 12 starts for Tabasco, he posted a 7–2 record and a league–leading 2.54 ERA with 43 strikeouts across 67 1/3 innings pitched.

=== Fubon Guardians ===
On January 6, 2022, Escobar signed with the Fubon Guardians of the Chinese Professional Baseball League. On May 23, Escobar requested and was granted his release for personal reasons. He never appeared in a game for the Guardians and only pitched for their farm team prior to his release.

=== Olmecas de Tabasco (second stint) ===
On July 5, 2022, Escobar signed with the Olmecas de Tabasco of the Mexican League. He made 6 starts for Tabasco down the stretch, struggling to a 2–2 record and 7.25 ERA with 12 strikeouts. In 2023, Escobar made 15 appearances (14 starts) for the team, registering a 6–6 record and 4.42 ERA with 48 strikeouts across 73 1/3 innings pitched.

=== Acereros de Monclova ===
On February 3, 2024, Escobar was traded to the Acereros de Monclova in exchange for Wirfin Obispo. He made 18 appearances (12 starts) for Monclova, posting a 4–3 record and 4.38 ERA with 35 strikeouts across 63 2/3 innings pitched. Escobar was released by Monclova on December 23.

== International career ==
Escobar was on Colombia's roster for the 2017 World Baseball Classic but did not play. He was named to the Colombian roster for the 2026 World Baseball Classic qualifiers, held in March 2025 in Tucson, Arizona.
