= José Mosquera =

Colombian baseball coach (born 1986)

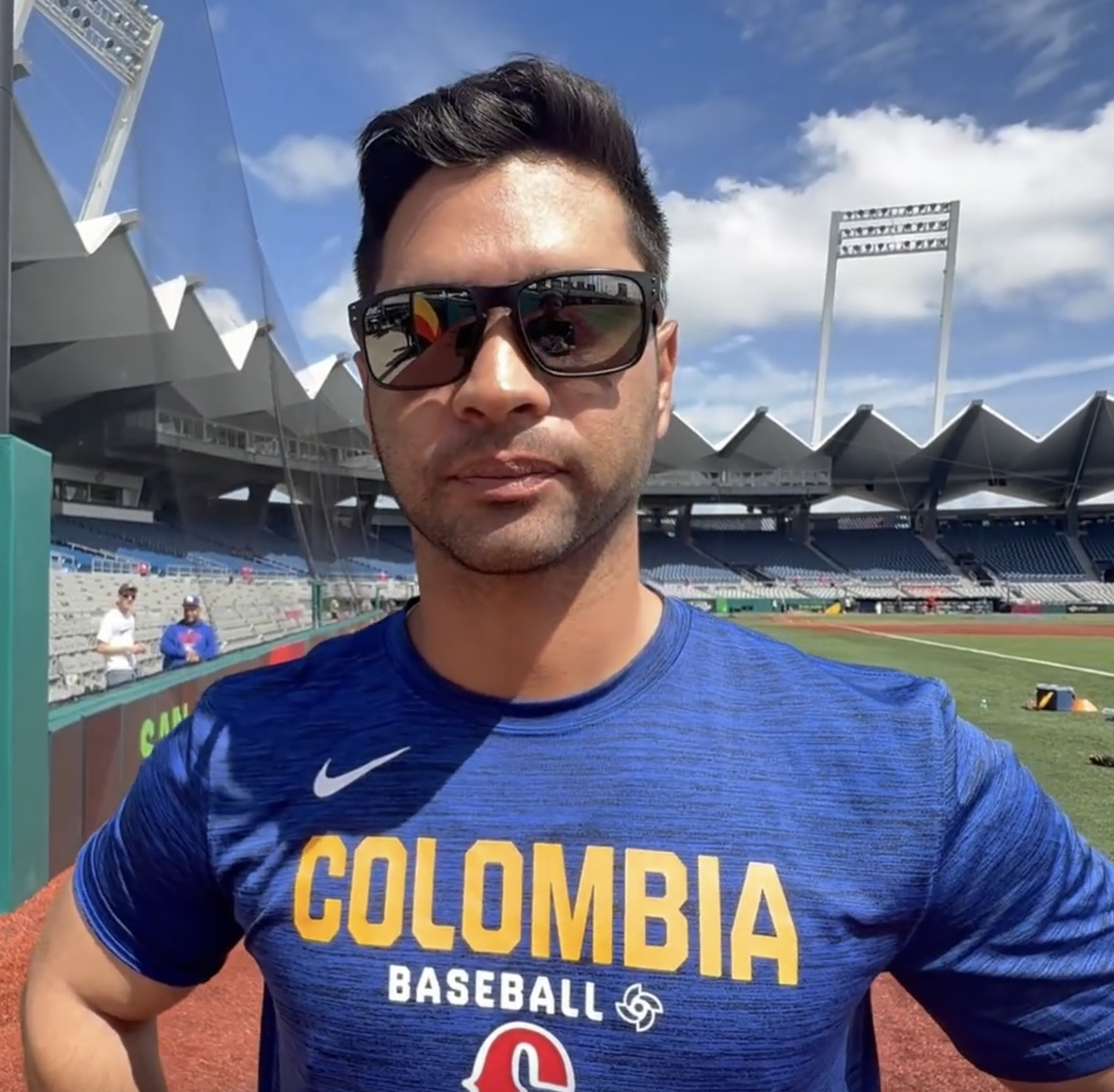
- Mosquera at the 2026 World Baseball Classic

Yaquis de Obregón
- Catcher / Manager
- Born: August 24, 1986 (age 40); Campo de la Cruz, Atlántico, Colombia
- Bats: Right Throws: Right
- Stats at Baseball Reference
Medals
Men's baseball
Manager for Colombia
Pan American Games
Gold medal – first place	2023 Santiago	Team

José Armando Mosquera Crisson (born August 24, 1986) is a Colombian former professional baseball player and scout who is the manager of Yaquis de Obregón in the Mexican Pacific League. He has previously managed in the Colombian Professional Baseball League and the Colombia national baseball team.

== Playing career ==
Mosquera was signed as an international free agent by the Los Angeles Dodgers in 2004, and spent time in the Pittsburgh Pirates minor league system. In two seasons with the VSL Pirates of the Venezuelan Summer League, he hit .240/.462/.281. He also led the league in HBP in 2005, with 18, despite playing only 39 games.

== Coaching career ==
In 2016, he became a Pirates scout. He coached the DSL Pirates 2 of the Dominican Summer League in 2019, and managed the DSL Pirates Gold in 2021. Mosquera also managed FCL Pirates of the Florida Complex League in 2022 and 2023.

Mosquera managed the Colombia national team in the 2018 Central American and Caribbean Games to a bronze medal finish, 72 years after their last baseball medal finish at the Central American and Caribbean Games. He also coached the team at the 2019 Pan American Games, and at the 2020 Summer Olympic qualifiers. Mosquera was a bench coach for Colombia at the 2023 World Baseball Classic.

In the Colombian league, he managed Caimanes de Barranquilla to back to back titles in 2020-21 and 2021-22, and in 2022 led them to the first ever Caribbean Series title by a team from Colombia. He led the team to another league title in 2023–24.

On June 15, 2024, Mosquera was named the next manager of the Colombia national team for the 2026 World Baseball Classic qualifiers, to take place in March 2025.

In 2026, Mosquera was named as manager for the Greensboro Grasshoppers the High-A affiliate of the Pittsburgh Pirates. He was also appointed manager of the Yaquis de Obregón of the Mexican Pacific League for the 2026–27 season.

== Personal life ==
Mosquera's grandfather, Armando "Niño Bueno" Crizón, was a member of the Colombia nation team that won the 1947 Amateur World Series, delivering Colombia its first major international title.
