= Pu-Men High School =

Location
- Dashu District, Kaohsiung; Taiwan; 22°43′00″N 120°26′46″E

Information
- Type: Private high school
- Motto: Diligence
- Established: 1977
- Principal: Lin Qingbuo (林清波)
- Grades: 7~12 grade
- Enrollment: Over 1000
- Website: https://www.pmsh.khc.edu.tw

Pu-Men Senior High School (Traditional Chinese: 普門中學) is a private Buddhist high school located in Dashu District, Kaohsiung, Taiwan. The school is affiliated with the Fo Guang Shan Buddhist order founded by Hsing Yun.

In 1977, the name was changed to Fo Guang Shan Pu-Men Senior High School, and the school was given to Fo Guang Shan.

== Founding principles ==
- Pu-Men, the Universal Door, is open to save all beings and to disseminate the spirit of the Guan Yin, the Bodhisattva of Compassion.
- Pu-Men believe in the importance of a Confucian education.
- Pu-Men is founded on Buddhism’s spirit of saving the world with an ideal education, great mercy, equality for all and unselfishness.
- Pu-Men strives to cultivate talents and virtues in youths by emphasizing intellectualism, morality, physical well being and an appreciation of the aesthetics, to benefit all societies and all nations.

== Notable alumni ==
- Tsung-Che Cheng, baseball infielder
- Wu Li-hua, member of the Legislative Yuan
