= 2022 Caribbean Series =

2022 baseball tournament

Tournament details
- Country: Dominican Republic
- City: Santo Domingo
- Venue: Estadio Quisqueya
- Dates: January 28 – February 3, 2022
- Teams: 6

Final positions
- Champions: (Colombia) Caimanes de Barranquilla (1st title)
- Runners-up: (Dominican Republic) Gigantes del Cibao

The 2022 Caribbean Series marked the 64th edition of the Caribbean Series from January 28 through February 3, 2022, played at Estadio Quisqueya in Santo Domingo, Dominican Republic.

The series brought together the champions of each professional baseball league in the countries that make up the Caribbean Professional Baseball Confederation (Venezuela, the Dominican Republic, Puerto Rico, and Mexico), plus the representatives of Panama and Colombia as guests.

== Stadium ==
Estadio Quisqueya Juan Marichal in Santo Domingo hosted the preliminary rounds, the semifinals, and final matches.

== Tournament format ==
A single round-robin format was used; each team faced each other once. The four teams with the best records advanced to the semifinals (1st vs. 4th and 2nd vs. 3rd), and the two winners met in the final to decide the tournament champion.

== Participating teams ==
Team	Manager	Means of qualification
(Colombia) Caimanes de Barranquilla	(Colombia) José Mosquera	Winners of the 2021–22 Colombian Professional Baseball League
(Mexico) Charros de Jalisco	(Mexico) Roberto Vizcarra	Winners of the 2021–22 Mexican Pacific League
(Panama) Astronautas de Los Santos	(Panama) Raúl Domínguez	Winners of the 2021–22 Panamanian Professional Baseball League
(Puerto Rico) Criollos de Caguas	(Puerto Rico) Ramón Vázquez	Winners of the 2021–22 Puerto Rican Professional Baseball League
(Dominican Republic) Gigantes del Cibao	(Colombia) Luis Urueta	Winners of the 2021–22 Dominican Professional Baseball League
(Venezuela) Navegantes del Magallanes	(Venezuela) Willie Romero	Winners of the 2021–22 Venezuelan Professional Baseball League

== Preliminary round ==
Pos	Team	Pld	W	L	RF	RA	RD	PCT	GB	Qualification
1	(Dominican Republic) Gigantes del Cibao (H)	5	4	1	24	17	+7	.800	—	Advance to knockout stage
2	(Colombia) Caimanes de Barranquilla	5	3	2	16	14	+2	.600 (Note: Head-to-head, TQB: Caimanes 1−1, 0.216; Navegantes 1−1, 0.020; Charros 1−1, −0.235)	1	Advance to knockout stage
3	(Venezuela) Navegantes del Magallanes	5	3	2	19	17	+2	.600	1	Advance to knockout stage
4	(Mexico) Charros de Jalisco	5	3	2	9	8	+1	.600	1	Advance to knockout stage
5	(Panama) Astronautas de Los Santos	5	1	4	12	18	−6	.200	3	
6	(Puerto Rico) Criollos de Caguas	5	1	4	13	19	−6	.200	3	

Rules for classification: 1) Wins; 2) Head-to-head matches; 3) Team quality balance; 4) Batting average; 5) Drawing of lots.
(H) Hosts
Notes:

Time zone: Atlantic Standard Time (UTC–4)

Date	Time	Away	Result	Home	Stadium
January 28	10:00	Criollos de Caguas (Puerto Rico)	2–3	(Panama) Astronautas de Los Santos	Estadio Quisqueya
January 28	15:00	Caimanes de Barranquilla (Colombia)	6–1	(Venezuela) Navegantes del Magallanes	Estadio Quisqueya
January 28	20:00	Gigantes del Cibao (Dominican Republic)	3–2	(Mexico) Charros de Jalisco	Estadio Quisqueya
January 29	10:00	Astronautas de Los Santos (Panama)	5–6	(Colombia) Caimanes de Barranquilla	Estadio Quisqueya
January 29	15:00	Charros de Jalisco (Mexico)	0–5	(Venezuela) Navegantes del Magallanes	Estadio Quisqueya
January 29	20:00	Criollos de Caguas (Puerto Rico)	3–5	(Dominican Republic) Gigantes del Cibao	Estadio Quisqueya
January 30	10:00	Caimanes de Barranquilla (Colombia)	0–1	(Mexico) Charros de Jalisco	Estadio Quisqueya
January 30	15:00	Navegantes del Magallanes (Venezuela)	4–2	(Puerto Rico) Criollos de Caguas	Estadio Quisqueya
January 30	20:00	Astronautas de Los Santos (Panama)	3–7	(Dominican Republic) Gigantes del Cibao	Estadio Quisqueya
January 31	10:30	Navegantes del Magallanes (Venezuela)	2–1	(Panama) Astronautas de Los Santos	Estadio Quisqueya
January 31	15:00	Charros de Jalisco (Mexico)	5–0	(Puerto Rico) Criollos de Caguas	Estadio Quisqueya
January 31	20:00	Gigantes del Cibao (Dominican Republic)	1–2	(Colombia) Caimanes de Barranquilla	Estadio Quisqueya
February 1	10:30	Caimanes de Barranquilla (Colombia)	2–6	(Puerto Rico) Criollos de Caguas	Estadio Quisqueya
February 1	15:00	Astronautas de Los Santos (Panama)	0–1	(Mexico) Charros de Jalisco	Estadio Quisqueya
February 1	20:00	Navegantes del Magallanes (Venezuela)	7–8 (10)	(Dominican Republic) Gigantes del Cibao	Estadio Quisqueya

== Knockout stage ==
Semi-finals
5	(Dominican Republic) Gigantes del Cibao	2
4	(Mexico) Charros de Jalisco	1
3	(Venezuela) Navegantes del Magallanes	1
2	(Colombia) Caimanes de Barranquilla	8

Final
1	(Dominican Republic) Gigantes del Cibao	1
2	(Colombia) Caimanes de Barranquilla	4

=== Semi-finals ===
Date	Time	Away	Result	Home	Stadium
February 2	15:00	Navegantes del Magallanes (Venezuela)	1–8	(Colombia) Caimanes de Barranquilla	Estadio Quisqueya
February 2	20:00	Charros de Jalisco (Mexico)	1–2	(Dominican Republic) Gigantes del Cibao	Estadio Quisqueya

=== Final ===
February 3, 2022 19:00 at Estadio Quisqueya in Santo Domingo, Dominican Republic
Team	1	2	3	4	5	6	7	8	9	R	H	E
(Colombia) Caimanes de Barranquilla	0	3	0	0	0	0	0	0	1	4	7	0
(Dominican Republic) Gigantes del Cibao	0	0	0	0	0	1	0	0	0	1	7	0
WP: Elkin Alcalá (1–0) LP: Raúl Valdés (1–1)

== Awards ==
All-Tournament Team
Position	Player
Starting Pitcher	(Dominican Republic) Tyler Alexander
Relief Pitcher	(Dominican Republic) Luis Felipe Castillo
Catcher	(Panama) Christian Bethancourt
First Baseman	(Colombia) Reynaldo Rodríguez
Second Baseman	(Dominican Republic) Robinson Canó
Third Baseman	(Venezuela) Niuman Romero
Shortstop	(Dominican Republic) Hanser Alberto
Outfielders	(Mexico) Félix Pérez (Dominican Republic) José Siri (Venezuela) Danry Vásquez
Designated Hitter	(Dominican Republic) Juan Francisco
Manager	(Colombia) José Mosquera
