= José Guillén =

Dominican baseball player (born 1976)

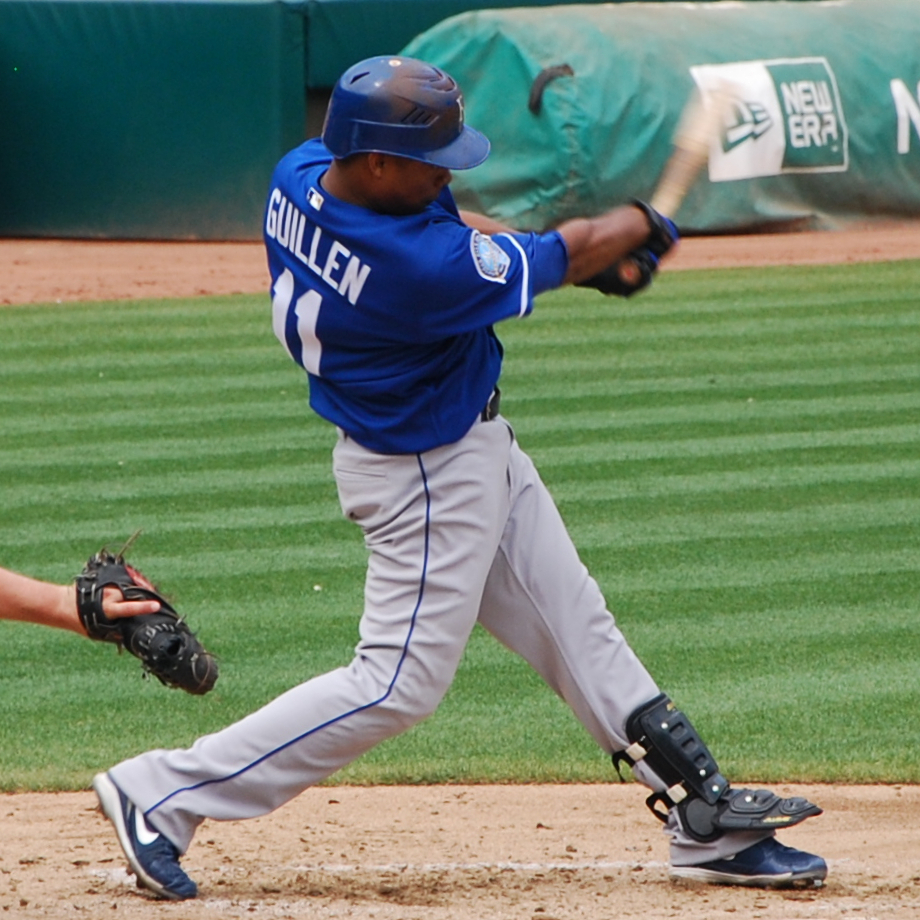
- Guillén batting for the Kansas City Royals in 2009
- Right fielder
- Born: May 17, 1976 (age 50); San Cristóbal, Dominican Republic
- Batted: Right Threw: Right

MLB debut
- April 1, 1997, for the Pittsburgh Pirates

Last MLB appearance
- October 3, 2010, for the San Francisco Giants

MLB statistics
- Batting average: .270
- Home runs: 214
- Runs batted in: 887
- Stats at Baseball Reference

Teams
- Pittsburgh Pirates (1997–1999); Tampa Bay Devil Rays (1999–2001); Arizona Diamondbacks (2002); Cincinnati Reds (2002–2003); Oakland Athletics (2003); Anaheim Angels (2004); Washington Nationals (2005–2006); Seattle Mariners (2007); Kansas City Royals (2008–2010); San Francisco Giants (2010)

José Manuel Guillén (pronounced [ɡiˈʎen]; born May 17, 1976) is a Dominican former professional baseball outfielder. Guillén played for ten Major League Baseball (MLB) teams in his career.

== Professional career ==
=== Pittsburgh Pirates ===
Guillén was signed by the Pittsburgh Pirates as an amateur free agent on August 19, 1993. He made his MLB debut on April 1, 1997 and was the team's everyday right fielder. Guillén made the jump to the Majors having played the entire 1996 campaign in High-A. On July 27, 1998, Guillén made what has been widely described as one of the most spectacular outfield assists in baseball history; after failing to make a leaping catch at the warning track at Coors Field, Guillén scooped up the ball and made a blistering throw to get Neifi Pérez out at third base.

=== Tampa Bay Devil Rays ===
On July 23, 1999, Guillén was traded, along with Jeff Sparks, to the Tampa Bay Devil Rays for Joe Oliver and Humberto Cota. On November 27, 2001, after two injury-plagued seasons with the Devil Rays, the team released him.

=== Arizona Diamondbacks ===
On December 18, 2001, Guillén signed with the Arizona Diamondbacks. He played in only 54 games for the Diamondbacks before being released on July 22, 2002.

=== Colorado Rockies ===
Guillén was signed by the Colorado Rockies on July 29, 2002, but was released just three days later on August 1, before playing in any games.

=== Cincinnati Reds ===
On August 20, 2002, Guillén signed with the Cincinnati Reds.

=== Oakland Athletics ===
On July 30, 2003, Guillén was traded by the Reds to the Oakland Athletics for Aaron Harang, Joe Valentine, Kyle Wallace, and Jeff Bruksch. While he was hitting home runs in 2003, he was not taking many walks. He is one of only six players who have concluded a 30-homer season with more homers than walks (31 HR, 29 BB), the others being Alfonso Soriano (39–23 in 2002), Garret Anderson (35–24 in 2000), Iván Rodríguez (35–24 in 1999), Joe Crede (30–28 in 2006), and Ryan Braun (34–24 in 2007) After the 2003 season he became a free agent.

=== Anaheim Angels ===
On December 20, 2003, Guillén was signed by the Anaheim Angels.

In 2004, he hit .294 with 27 home runs and 104 RBIs for the Angels, but he was suspended the last two weeks of the regular season and during the postseason for "inappropriate conduct" in publicly expressing his displeasure with Angels manager Mike Scioscia following Scioscia's removal of Guillén in favor of a pinch runner during a crucial game against the Oakland Athletics.

=== Washington Nationals ===
On November 19, 2004, he was traded to the Washington Nationals for shortstop Maicer Izturis and outfielder Juan Rivera. The move sent Guillén to his sixth team in just five seasons.

In 2005, Guillén began his season strongly. In April, he batted .303 with 6 home runs and 14 RBIs. The Nationals were impressed and on April 29, they exercised his option for 2006.

On June 14, 2005, the Nationals began a three-game series against the Angels, who were still helmed by Mike Scioscia. This marked Guillén's first return to Anaheim since being traded. Going into the series, both Guillén and Scioscia kept a civil tone publicly, each indicating that the past was behind them and claiming that they held no hard feelings toward each other. However, the tensions below the surface were exposed when, during the second game of the series, Angels pitcher Brendan Donnelly was found with illegal substances on his glove.

Donnelly was ejected from the game, and Scioscia came out of the dugout and exchanged hostile words with Nationals manager Frank Robinson, who had instigated the search of Donnelly's glove. The confrontation led to both teams' benches being cleared as all of the players streamed out on to the field. As he was being restrained by fellow Nationals players, Guillén shouted angry words at the Angels, a number of whom made it clear that they felt their former teammate had been the one who told Robinson to have Donnelly's glove examined. (Several weeks later, Guillén would acknowledge that he had indeed done so.)

In the eighth inning of the same game, Guillén hit a two-run home run to tie the game, and the Nationals went on to win. After the series' final game, Guillén blasted Scioscia and acknowledged that despite his earlier statements to the contrary, he was in fact still hurt over what had happened at the end of the 2004 season.

I don't got truly no respect for [Scioscia] anymore because I'm still hurt from what happened last year . . . Mike Scioscia, to me, is like a piece of garbage . . . He can go to hell . . I can never get over about what happened last year. It's something I'm never going to forget. Any time I play that team, Mike Scioscia's managing, it's always going to be personal to me.

Nevertheless, Guillén remained as a crucial ball player for the Washington Nationals. In 2005, he hit .283 with 24 home runs and 76 RBI for Washington.

In 2006, he was involved in an incident with Pedro Martínez. Martinez hit him with a pitch twice, and after the second time Guillén charged the mound, only to be held back by Paul Lo Duca and umpire Ted Barrett. Guillén appeared in only 69 games and hit only .216 with 9 homers and 40 RBI. On July 25, 2006, he was diagnosed with a tear of the ulnar collateral ligament in his right elbow, which would require ligament replacement surgery.

=== Seattle Mariners ===
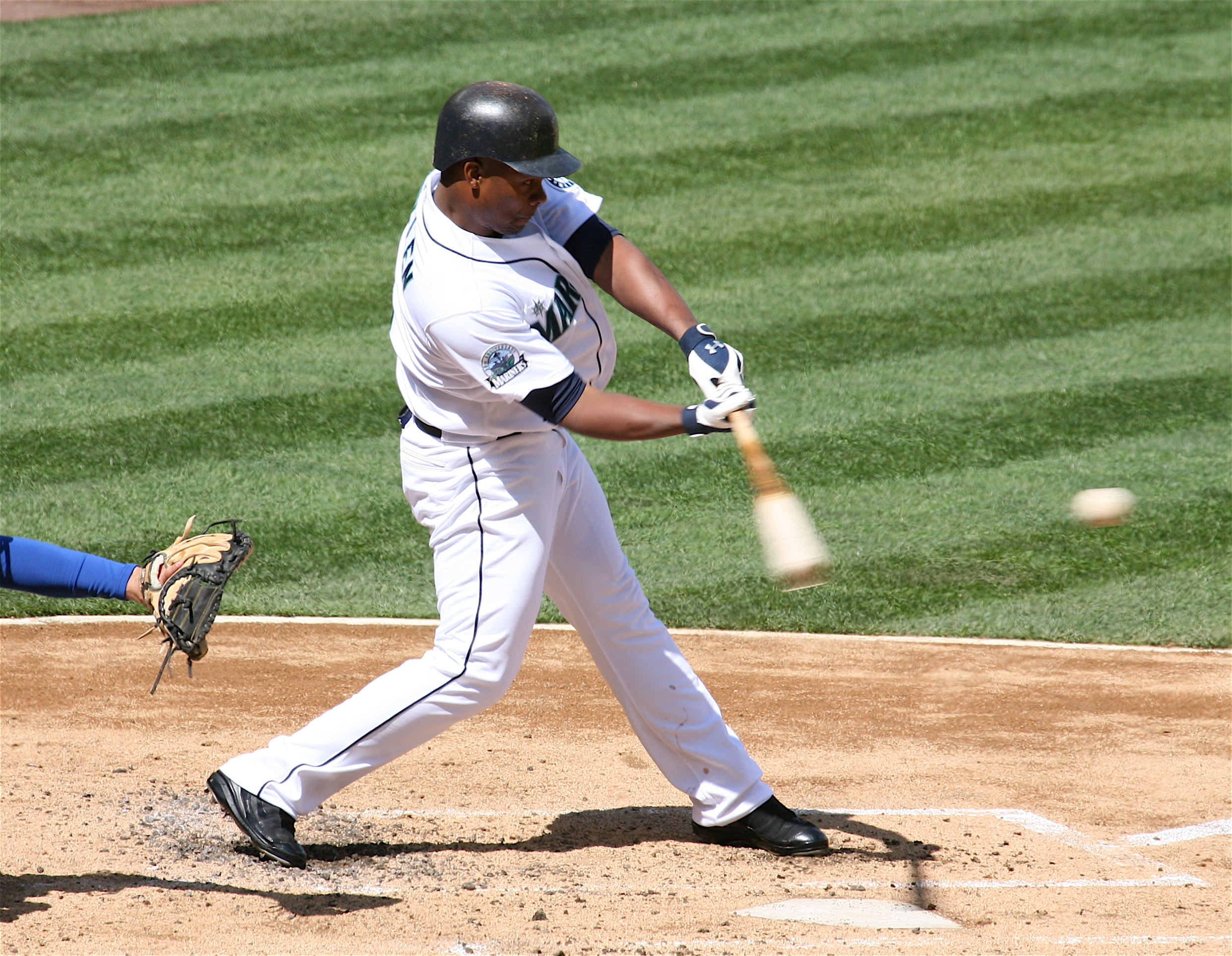
Guillén batting for the Seattle Mariners in 2007

Before the 2007 season Guillén signed with the Seattle Mariners. His swing, which is very balanced and natural, moved him up in the Mariners' lineup to hit in the coveted third spot during May 2007. Guillén helped the Mariners return to the playoff hunt in 2007 after not making the playoffs since 2001.

In 2007 it was reported that in 2003 Guillén had had performance-enhancing drugs sent directly to him in the Oakland Coliseum.

=== Kansas City Royals ===
On December 4, 2007, Guillén signed a 3-year, $36 million contract with the Kansas City Royals. His signing moved Mark Teahen to left field, and Billy Butler to first base. He was suspended for the first 15 days of the 2008 season on December 6, 2007, just hours after passing his physical exam. His 15-day suspension was rescinded on April 11, 2008; after the MLB Players' Association and MLB owners agreed on modifications to the current drug testing program. As a result of the agreement, all players implicated in the Mitchell Report were given amnesty.

In a game on August 26, 2008, in Kansas City against the Texas Rangers, Guillén was involved in a confrontation with a fan in the stands just past the Royals dugout down the first base line. He made vulgar gestures and yelled profanity at the fan who had reportedly been heckling him for his lack of hustle. His coaches and teammates had to restrain him as he made his way towards the fan. The fan was removed from his seat.

On May 21, 2010, Guillén got his 1,500th career hit in Kauffman Stadium against the Colorado Rockies.

On August 5, Guillén was designated for assignment.

=== San Francisco Giants ===
On August 13, 2010, Guillén was traded to the San Francisco Giants for cash and a player to be named later which turned out to be Kevin Pucetas. But shortly after joining the Giants, he was placed on their restricted list for postseason eligibility because he was being investigated for performance-enhancing drugs.

== Alleged use of performance-enhancing drugs ==
Guillén was linked to performance-enhancing drugs in the Mitchell Report. He was suspended for fifteen games in 2007, but was granted amnesty like all other players mentioned in that report. In 2009, he acknowledged that he had worked "for many years" with Angel Presinal, a personal trainer closely linked to performance-enhancing drugs and who is currently banned from major league clubhouses. But he claimed he hadn't worked with Presinal since 2004 although they were still friends, and continues to claim that he has never used (or even been offered) performance-enhancing drugs.

In 2010, MLB began an inquiry on shipments of human growth hormone received by Guillén, and directed the Giants to keep him off their postseason roster. On November 14, it was revealed that the DEA had intercepted a package of fifty HGH syringes en route to Guillén's house.

== See also ==
- List of Major League Baseball players suspended for performance-enhancing drugs
- List of Major League Baseball players named in the Mitchell Report
