= Kevin Pucetas =

American professional baseball pitcher (born 1984)

- Pitcher
- Born: November 27, 1984 (age 41); Spartanburg, South Carolina
- Bats: Right Throws: Right
- Stats at Baseball Reference

Kevin Randall Pucetas (born November 27, 1984) is an American professional baseball pitcher.

== Career ==
Pucetas attended Broome High School and Limestone College. Pucetas was selected in the 17th round of the 2006 MLB amateur entry draft. He participated in the 2008 All-Star Futures Game. For the Fresno Grizzlies in 2009, Pucetas was 10–6 with a 5.04 earned run average.

On October 15, 2010, Pucetas was traded to the Kansas City Royals as the player to be named later that sent José Guillén to the San Francisco Giants.

He was designated for assignment on June 10, 2011.

Pucetas was released by the Royals and picked up by the Washington Nationals on March 28, 2012.

Pucetas was signed to a minor league contract by the Texas Rangers on January 15, 2013. The deal did not include an invite to Major League camp. Pucetas pitched for the Frisco RoughRiders of the Class AA Texas League in 2013. After the season, he agreed to try to become a knuckleball pitcher.

Pucetas signed a minor league contract with the San Francisco Giants for the 2015 season, making his way back to the team that first drafted him. He became a free agent after the 2015 season.
