= Luis Urueta =

Colombian baseball coach (born 1981)

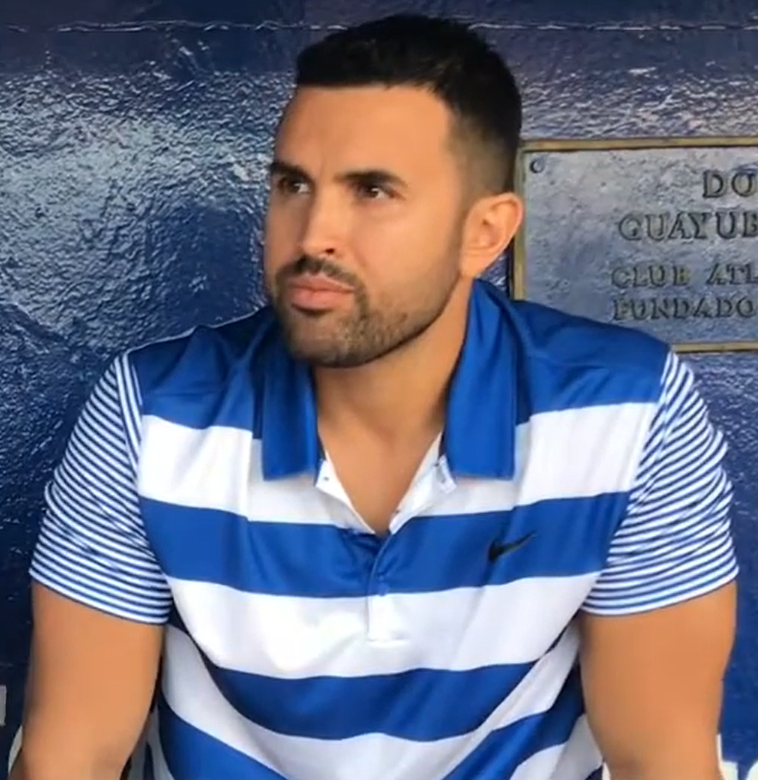
- Urueta in 2019

Texas Rangers – No. 81
- First baseman / Coach / Manager
- Born: January 9, 1981 (age 45); Barranquilla, Colombia
- Bats: Switch Throws: Right

Career statistics
- Managerial Record: 2–0
- Winning %: 1.000
- Stats at Baseball Reference

Teams
- As coach: Arizona Diamondbacks (2018–2022); Miami Marlins (2023–2024); Texas Rangers (2025–present); As manager: Miami Marlins (2024)

Luis Felipe Urueta Romano (born January 9, 1981) is a Colombian professional baseball coach for the Texas Rangers in Major League Baseball (MLB). He was formerly a first baseman, coach, and manager in Minor League Baseball, and also served as the interim manager for the Miami Marlins in 2024. He has also coached and managed the Colombia national baseball team in the World Baseball Classic (WBC). As a player, Urueta was listed at 6 feet 2 inches (1.88 m) and 210 pounds (95 kg); he threw right-handed and was a switch hitter.

== Playing career ==
Urueta was primarily a first baseman in Minor League Baseball for three seasons. He was the first Colombian player to sign with the Arizona Diamondbacks organization. In 2000, he played for the rookie-level Arizona League Diamondbacks, compiling a .235 batting average with three home runs and 27 RBI in 54 games. In 2002, he played 41 games for the Missoula Osprey in the rookie-level Pioneer League and nine games for the Single–A South Bend Silver Hawks; between the two teams, he batted .163 with two home runs and nine RBI. In 2003, he played four games for the Low–A New Jersey Cardinals and eight games for the High–A Palm Beach Cardinals; overall, he batted .100 (3–for–30) with one RBI. In a career total of 116 minor league games, he batted .195 with five home runs and 37 RBI.

Defensively in the minor leagues, Urueta appeared in 74 games as a first baseman, 12 games as an outfielder, and one game each as a third baseman and as a catcher. He had a .987 fielding percentage at first base.

Also in 2003, Urueta played six games for the Gary SouthShore RailCats of the independent Northern League. He batted .238 (5-for-21) in six games, with one home run and one RBI. He did not play professionally in the United States after 2003.

From 2004 through 2006, Urueta played for Fortitudo Bologna in the Italian Baseball League. He slashed .221/.345/.253 in 2004. In 2005, he batted only .187/.230/.239; he improved in the finals, going 7-for-23 to help his team win it all. After another meek campaign (.205/.317/.270, 1-for-26 in the playoffs) in 2006, he ended his playing career.

== Coaching career ==
=== Minor leagues ===
Urueta has been a coach or coordinator in the Diamondbacks' farm system since 2007. He was field coordinator for the Dominican Summer League Diamondbacks in 2011 and a coach for the South Bend Silver Hawks in 2012. He managed the Arizona League Diamondbacks in 2013 and 2014, accruing an overall managerial win–loss record of 58–54 in those two seasons. Urueta was a coach for the Triple-A Reno Aces in 2015.

=== International ===
Urueta coached for Colombia in the 2013 World Baseball Classic Qualifiers, then managed the team in the 2017 World Baseball Classic Qualifiers. He guided the team past former WBC teams Panama and Spain to a spot in the 2017 World Baseball Classic, Colombia's first trip to the World Baseball Classic. Following this historic qualification, Urueta's services were also retained to skipper the national team at the WBC.

Urueta served as manager of the Liga Dominicana de Beisbol Profesional team Tigres de Licey.

=== Major leagues ===
==== Arizona Diamondbacks ====
In October 2017, Urueta was hired as a major league coach for the Arizona Diamondbacks. He became the bench coach for the Diamondbacks in the 2020 season. Urueta became acting manager in a game against the San Diego Padres on July 26, 2020, after Arizona manager Torey Lovullo was ejected in the fifth inning; it was the first time that a person from Colombia managed a team during a major league game.

==== Miami Marlins ====
On November 11, 2022, the Miami Marlins hired Urueta as their bench coach for the 2023 season. Marlins manager Skip Schumaker left the team with two games remaining in the 2024 season, ceding managerial duties to Urueta. On October 2, 2024, Urueta was fired alongside the entirety of the Marlins coaching staff.

=== Texas Rangers ===
On November 5, 2024, Urueta was hired by the Texas Rangers to serve as the team's bench coach, with the intention of having the incumbent bench coach Donnie Ecker transition to a focus on hitting.

== Managerial record ==
As of games played on September 30, 2024

Team	Year	Regular season					Postseason			
Team	Year	Games	Won	Lost	Win %	Finish	Won	Lost	Win %	Result
MIA	2024	2	2	0	1.000	5th in NL East	–	–	–	–
Total		2	2	0	1.000					

== Personal life ==
Urueta's nickname is "Pipe" (from Felipe). He is married and has two daughters. As a teenager, Urueta was a football (soccer) goalkeeper; he was inspired to pursue a baseball career after watching Édgar Rentería's game-winning hit in Game 7 of the 1997 World Series.
