= Dominican Summer League Pirates 2 =

Dominican Summer Pirates 2
- (2004-2013); Originally played in San Joaquín, Carabobo, Venezuela from 2004 until 2011. Relocated to Boca Chica, Dominican Republic for 2012 and 2013 seasons.

Minor league affiliations
- Previous classes: Class Foreign Rookie League (2004-2013)
- Previous leagues: Dominican Summer League (2012-2013); Venezuelan Summer League (2004-2011)

Major league affiliations
- Previous teams: Pittsburgh Pirates (2004-2013)

Minor league titles
- League titles: VSL: 2 (2008, 2010)
- Division titles: VSL: 6 (2006, 2007, 2008, 2009, 2010, 2011)

Team data
- Previous names: DSL Pirates 2 (2012-2013); VSL Pirates (2005-2011); San Joaquín (2004)

The Dominican Summer Pirates 2 or DSL Pirates 2 was briefly the second Dominican Summer League team affiliated with the Pittsburgh Pirates and were based in Boca Chica, Dominican Republic from 2012 to 2013.

== History ==
However the team was previously known as the Venezuelan Summer Pirates or VSL Pirates and was a part of the Venezuelan Summer League, from 2004 until 2011. During that time, the team was affiliated with the Pirates and based in San Joaquín, Carabobo, Venezuela. The team has won 5 straight league regular season titles over the span of 2006 to 2010. They have also won league championship titles in 2008 and 2010.

On September 12, 2011, the Pirates announced that the organization would be terminating its lease and no longer participate in the six-team Venezuelan Summer League. The instability and political climate in Venezuela are thought to have played a large role in the organization's decision to pull out of the league. The decision led to the Pirates fielding two teams in the Dominican Summer League, with the remnants of the VSL Pirates forming the Dominican Summer Pirates 2. Both clubs will accommodate 35 players, meaning that the closure of the Venezuelan academy will not impact the number of players the Pirates can develop in Latin America.

The DSL Pirates 2 posted a 34-34 record in their first season. During their 2013 season the team posted a 46-26 record, but were eliminated in the first round of the playoff by the DSL Tigers. They Pirates returned to one DSL team in 2014.

== Season-by-season record ==
San Joaquin (Venezuelan Summer League)
| Year | | | | | |
| Year | Record | Win % | Finish* | Manager | Playoffs |
|---|---|---|---|---|---|
| 2004 | 28-35 | .444 | 8th | N/A | |
Venezuelan Summer Pirates (Venezuelan Summer League)
| 2005 | 29-33 | .468 | 7th | Osmin Melendez | |
| 2006 | 41-25 | .621 | 1st (t) | Osmin Melendez | Lost League Finals |
| 2007 | 49-21 | .700 | 1st | Osmin Melendez | Lost League Finals |
| 2008 | 46-22 | .676 | 1st | Osmin Melendez | League Champs |
| 2009 | 48-22 | .686 | 1st | Osmin Melendez | Lost League Finals |
| 2010 | 48-20 | .706 | 1st | Osmin Melendez | League Champs |
| 2011 | 40-32 | .556 | 1st | Osmin Melendez | Lost League Finals |
Dominican Summer League Pirates 2 (Dominican Summer League)
| 2012 | 34-34 | .500 | 4th Boca Chica South | Larry Sutton | |
| 2013 | 46-26 | . 639 | 2nd Boca Chica South | Keoni De Renne | Lost in 1st round |

== 2013 Roster ==
Dominican Summer League Pirates 2 roster
| Players | | Coaches/Other |
| Pitchers: 90 Dario Agrazal; 70 Omar Basulto; -- Jose Batista; 66 Luis Brun; 97 Remy De Aza; 83 Hector Garcia; 34 Alexander Gutierrez; 28 Delvin Hiciano ‡; -- Edgar Martinez; -- Andres Mendoza; 49 Jorge Mendoza; 91 Luylli Miranda; 62 Richard Mitchell; 17 Duarjenis Palma; 73 Jesus Paredes; 68 Horelbin Ramos; 86 Francis Rodriguez; 72 Eduardo Vera; 38 Julio Vivas | Catchers: 2 Yoel Gonzalez; 14 Carlos Marquez; 47 Ramy Perez; 27 Edgardo Rangel; Infielders: 67 Gustavo Barrios; 60 Bealyn Chourio; 18 Jhoan Herrera; 77 Carlos Munoz; 30 Edgardo Munoz; 51 Fredis Padilla; 17 Jose Salazar; Outfielders: 89 Alexis Bastardo; 16 Michael De La Cruz; 13 Steven De La Mota; 48 Edgar Figueroa; 99 Yomifer Polanco; 58 Jesus Ronco | Manager: -- Keoni De Renne; Coaches: -- Johe Acosta (hitting); -- Jairo Cuevas (pitching); 7-day injured list * On Pittsburgh Pirates 40-man roster ~ Development list # Rehab assignment ∞ Reserve list ‡ Restricted list § Suspended list † Temporarily inactive list Roster updated August 26, 2013; Transactions → More MiLB rosters → Pittsburgh Pirates minor league players |
