= Gigantes del Cibao =

Professional baseball team in San Francisco de Macorís, Dominican Republic

- Cap insignia

Information
- League: Dominican Professional Baseball League
- Location: San Francisco de Macorís, Dominican Republic
- Ballpark: Estadio Julian Javier (1975–present)
- Founded: 23 April 1996; 30 years ago
- League championships: 2: 2015; 2022
- Mascot: Caballito Cibaeño
- General manager: Jaylon Pimentel
- Manager: Miguel Cairo

Current uniforms
Home	Away	Third

Gigantes del Cibao (GC; English: Cibao Giants) are a professional baseball team that plays in the Dominican Professional Baseball League (LIDOM). The team was founded in 1996 as Gigantes del Noroeste then with a change of ownership the name was changed several times, being called Pollos del Cibao, and Pollos Baseball Club.

== History ==
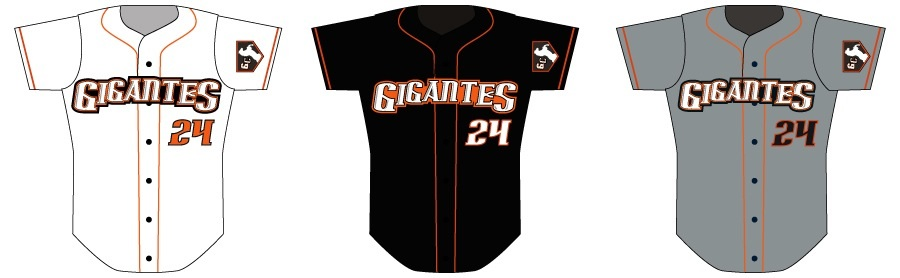
Gigantes del Cibao Uniforms

At the start of the professional Dominican Republic baseball season in 1995, the League of Professional Baseball reported that for the 1996 season it planned to create another franchise to expand the league, to that date there were only five teams: Tigres del Licey, Aguilas Cibaeñas, Leones del Escogido, Estrellas Orientales and Toros del Este.

Thus, a group led by former baseball major league player Julián Javier, who had arranged for the appointment or purchase of the franchise, accompanied by José Aníbal García, Ysócrates Peña, Abraham Abukarma who formed a committee, this committee met with Siquió NG de la Rosa getting the necessary partners to invest in the project.

The company was established as Nordeste Baseball Club, which has 34 founding members from the different provinces of the Cibao region. Among the members are: Carlos Eliseo Negrin, Celso Ventura, Miguel Angel Almanzar, Rafael Almanzar, José Adolfo Herrera and others.

In 1996, they were granted permission to operate and immediately began to put the old Estadio Julian Javier in conditions for baseball.

The first three years of operation of the team were in the hands of the Dominican Baseball League who held the guidance and advice of the steps to be followed for the proper functioning of the newly established team.

In 1999, the team broke the record for fewest games won, 9–51. Shareholders decided to re-list the team.Julio Hazim immediately renamed the team as Pollos del Cibao, staying for two years as head of the administration team. It was in the first season of the new ownership when Hazim fixed part of the stands, stadium roof and drainage. That same year there was a new sale, this time to former big leaguer Stanley Javier, who decided to return to the previous name. Now it was no longer the Gigantes of nordeste (Giants of Northeast) but: Gigantes del Cibao. From 2004 to 2012, the team was under the direction of the Genao family. Since 2013, the team went on to be managed by the Rizek Family.

== Estadio Julian Javier ==
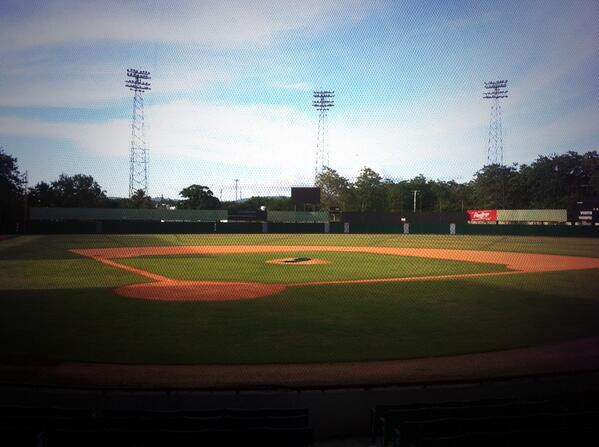
Estadio Julian Javier

The Estadio Julian Javier is the home of Gigantes del Cibao, located in San Francisco de Macoris, Dominican Republic. The stadium was built for the 1975 National Games, and has capacity for 12,000 people. The stadium is named in honor of former MLB Dominican baseball player Julian Javier.

== Presidents ==
The Gigantes have had several presidents from its founding to the present day:

- Siquio NG de la Rosa (Founding President)
- José Anibal Garcia
- Angel Miguel Almanzar
- Carlos Eliseo Negrin
- Julio Hazim
- Stanley Javier
- Alberto Genao
- Laurentino Genao
- Samir Rizek Sued

== Rivalries ==
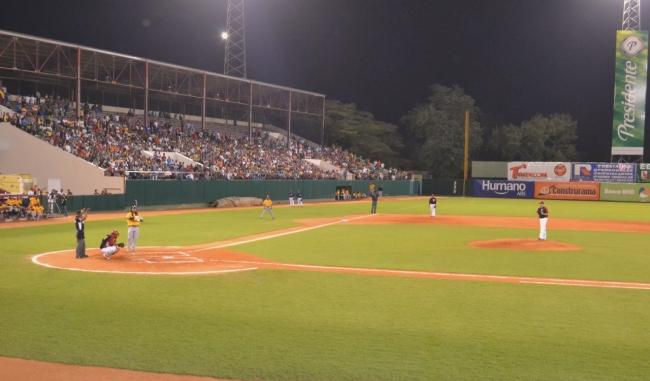
Manny Ramirez facing Kevin Pucetas in the Estadio Julian Javier.

- Aguilas Cibaeñas

The Gigantes have a rivalry with Aguilas Cibaeñas due to the proximity of the two cities. The two teams are in the same region, and the opening match is always played between these two, just changing the venue each year.

- Tigres del Licey

Another great sporting rivalry is with the Tigres del Licey. This has developed because of the three finals in which the team has participated, 2 were against the Tigres del Licey. In fact, the first loss in the history of the Gigantes was against Licey.

Another factor is in the final series of the 2008–09 season where these two had clashed, scuffles occurred between players of each team. The Gigantes play home games in the Estadio Quisqueya, home of the Tigres.

== Fans ==
The Gigantes have the sixth largest number of fans in the league, after Tigres del Licey, Águilas Cibaeñas, Leones del Escogido, Toros del Este and Estrellas Orientales. The team is young, and is one of the fastest growing markets in the league.

== Lifetime record ==
Year	Record	finished
1996–97	20–28	Miss the Round Robin
1997–98	23–28	Miss the Round Robin
1998–99	9–51	Miss the Round Robin
1999–00	16–31	Miss the Round Robin
2000–01	19–30	Miss the Round Robin
2001–02	15–33	Miss the Round Robin
2002–03	27–23	Make the Round Robin
2003–04	26–24	Make the Round Robin (Loss in the final)
2004–05	27–22	Make the Round Robin
2005–06	17–33	Miss the Round Robin
2006–07	31–19	Make the Round Robin
2007–08	29–18	Make the Round Robin
2008–09	31–19	Make the Round Robin (Loss in the final)
2009–10	27–22	Make the Round Robin (Loss in the final)
2010–11	25–24	Make the Round Robin
2011–12	25–26	Make the Round Robin
2012–13	22–29	Miss the Round Robin
2013–14	22-28	Make the Round Robin
2014–15	28–22	Champions
2015–16	22–28	Missed the Round Robin
2016–17	27–23	Made the Round Robin
2017–18	29–21	Made the Round Robin
2018–19	20–30	Missed the Round Robin
2019–20	21–29	Missed the Round Robin
2020–21	16–14	Made the Round Robin (Loss in the final)
2021–22	22-17	Champions

== Managers ==
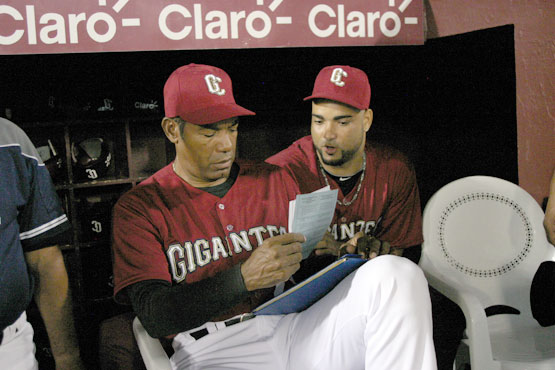
Arturo De Freites has managed the team in four different seasons, more than any other manager.

Year	Manager	interim
1996–97	Julián Javier	
1997–98	Osvaldo Virgil	
1998–99	Alejandrito Taveras	
1999–00	Alejandrito Taveras	
2000–01	Miguel Diloné	
2001–02	Miguel Diloné	
2002–03	John Shoemaker	
2003–04	Miguel Diloné	
2004–05	Arturo De Freites	
2005–06	John Shoemaker	Arturo De Freites
2006–07	Arturo De Freites	
2007–08	Mike Rojas	Luis Natera
2008–09	Luis Dorante	
2009–10	Félix Fermín	
2010–11	Félix Fermín	
2011–12	Arturo De Freites	Héctor de la Cruz
2012–13	Héctor de la Cruz	Bonny Castillo
2013–14	Mako Oliveras	
2014-15	Audo Vicente	
2015-2016	Luis Dorante	

== Outstanding players ==
Players include:

- Jose Reyes
- Albert Pujols
- Plácido Polanco
- Kendry Morales
- Joel Peralta
- Nelson Cruz
- Román Colón
- Pedro Strop
- Ramón Santiago
- Erick Almonte
- Alexi Casilla
- Wilson Valdez
- Wilson Betemit
- Marcell Ozuna
- Leury Garcia
- Brayan Peña
- Jean Segura
- Carlos Peguero
- John Halama
- Scott Spiezio
- Aquilino Lopez
- Darío Veras
- Juan Pérez
- Mark Trumbo
- Jimmy Paredes
- Antonio Bastardo
- Pedro Féliz
- Ty Wigginton

And many others.

== 2022 Caribbean Series Roster ==
Dominican Republic 2022 Caribbean Series Roster
Players		Coaches
Pitchers: (Dominican Republic) Fernando Abad; (Dominican Republic) Albert Abreú; (United States) Tyler Alexander; (Dominican Republic) Lisalverto Bonilla; (Dominican Republic) Huascar Brazobán; (Dominican Republic) Luis Felipe Castillo; (Dominican Republic) Frank Garcés; (Dominican Republic) Reymín Guduán; (United States) Ryan Kussmaul; (Dominican Republic) Jhan Mariñez; (Cuba) Yunesky Maya; (Dominican Republic) Jenrry Mejía; (Dominican Republic) Juan Minaya; (Dominican Republic) Carlos Pimentel; (Dominican Republic) Luis Santos; (Cuba) Raúl Valdés; (Dominican Republic) Gabriel Ynoa; updated on 27 January 2022	Catchers: (Dominican Republic) Carlos Paulino; (Dominican Republic) Webster Rivas; (Dominican Republic) Wilin Rosario; Infielders: (Dominican Republic) Hanser Alberto; (Dominican Republic) Robinson Canó; (Dominican Republic) Edwin Espinal; (Dominican Republic) Juan Francisco; (Dominican Republic) Ronald Guzmán; (Dominican Republic) Kelvin Gutiérrez; (Dominican Republic) Gustavo Núñez; (Dominican Republic) Richard Ureña; (Cuba) Henry Urrutia; Outfielders: (Dominican Republic) Melky Mesa; (Dominican Republic) Marcell Ozuna; (Dominican Republic) José Siri; (Dominican Republic) Moisés Sierra; (Dominican Republic) Jordany Valdespin	Manager: (Colombia) Luis Urueta; Coaches
