= Ramón Cabrera (baseball) =

Venezuelan baseball player (born 1989)

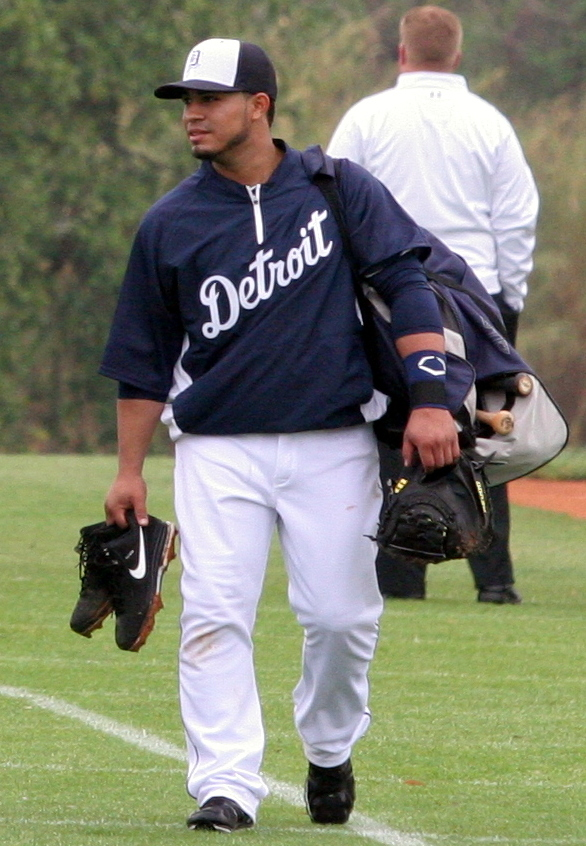
- Cabrera with the Detroit Tigers in 2013

Delfines de La Guaira – No. 38
- Catcher
- Born: November 5, 1989 (age 36); Caracas, Venezuela
- Bats: Switch Throws: Right

MLB debut
- September 5, 2015, for the Cincinnati Reds

MLB statistics (through 2016 season)
- Batting average: .264
- Home runs: 4
- Runs batted in: 26
- Stats at Baseball Reference

Teams
- Cincinnati Reds (2015–2016)

Ramón Salvador Cabrera Quereigua (born November 5, 1989) is a Venezuelan professional baseball catcher for the Delfines de La Guaira of the Venezuelan Major League. He has previously played in Major League Baseball (MLB) for the Cincinnati Reds.

== Career ==
=== Pittsburgh Pirates ===
On April 11, 2008, Cabrera signed with the Pittsburgh Pirates organization as an undrafted free agent. He made his professional debut with the Venezuelan Summer League Pirates, and hit .264 in 56 games. In 2009, Cabrera split the year between the VSL Pirates and the Gulf Coast League Pirates, hitting .299 in 57 games between the two affiliates. For the 2010 season, Cabrera played for the Single-A West Virginia Power, slashing .269/.312/.342 with 1 home run and 40 RBI in 90 games. The following season, he played for the High-A Bradenton Marauders, batting .343/.410/.471 with career-highs in home runs (3) and RBI (53). Cabrera played in 112 games for the Double-A Altoona Curve in 2012, also appearing in 1 game for the Triple-A Indianapolis Indians, and hit .278/.343/.370 with 3 home runs and 50 RBI. On November 20, 2012, the Pirates added Cabrera to the 40-man roster to protect him from the Rule 5 Draft.

=== Detroit Tigers ===
On December 5, 2012, Cabrera was traded to the Detroit Tigers in exchange for Andy Oliver. He split the 2013 season between the Double-A Erie SeaWolves and the Triple-A Toledo Mud Hens, accumulating a .284/.367/.371 slash line with 1 home run and 69 RBI. He was assigned to Erie to begin the 2014 season, and played in 107 games, slashing .277/.329/.358 and earning Eastern League All-Star honors.

=== Pittsburgh Pirates (second stint) ===
On August 13, 2014, Cabrera was claimed off waivers by the Pittsburgh Pirates. He finished the year with Double-A Altoona, going 11-for-46 (.239) in 12 games. Cabrera was designated for assignment by the Pirates November 20, and released on November 24.

=== Cincinnati Reds ===
On December 9, 2014, Cabrera signed a minor league contract with the Cincinnati Reds organization. He was assigned to the Triple-A Louisville Bats of the International League to begin the 2015 season. The Reds selected Cabrera to the 40-man roster and promoted him to the major leagues for the first time on September 1, 2015. He made his major league debut on September 5 as a pinch hitter for Ryan LaMarre, and flew out in his only at-bat. He finished his rookie year 11-for-30 in 13 games with 1 home run and 3 RBI. He split the 2016 season between Louisville and Cincinnati, slashing .246/.279/.357 with 3 home runs and 23 RBI in 61 games for the Reds. On November 28, 2016, Cabrera was designated for assignment. He was non-tendered on by Cincinnati December 2, and became a free agent.

=== Miami Marlins ===
On January 12, 2017, Cabrera signed a minor league contract with the Miami Marlins that included an invitation to spring training. He spent the year with the Triple-A New Orleans Baby Cakes, hitting .217/.278/.354 with 5 home runs and 23 RBI. He elected free agency following the season on November 6.

=== Long Island Ducks ===
On May 14, 2018, Cabrera signed with the Long Island Ducks of the Atlantic League of Professional Baseball. In 84 games for Long Island, Cabrera logged a .268/.289/.364 slash line with 3 home runs and 31 RBI. On April 8, 2019, Cabrera re-signed with the Ducks for the 2019 season. In 66 games for the Ducks, Cabrera slashed .249/.279/.397 with 7 home runs and 25 RBI. He became a free agent following the season. On January 27, 2020, Cabrera again re-signed with the Ducks for the 2020 season. However, Cabrera did not play in a game in 2020 following the cancellation of the Atlantic League season because of the COVID-19 pandemic. He became a free agent after the year.

=== Ibaraki Astro Planets ===
On January 12, 2021, Cabrera signed with the Ibaraki Astro Planets of the Baseball Challenge League in Japan. He became a free agent after the 2021 season.

=== Leones de Yucatán ===
On July 24, 2024, after several years of inactivity, Cabrera signed with the Leones de Yucatán of the Mexican League. In 3 games for Yucatán, he went 4–for–10 (.400) with one home run and one RBI.

Cabrera made 22 appearances for Yucatán in 2025, batting .235/.303/.368 with two home runs and 10 RBI. On June 29, 2025, Cabrera was released by the Leones.

=== Sultanes de Monterrey ===
On July 11, 2025, Cabrera signed with the Sultanes de Monterrey of the Mexican League. He struggled in a limited number of plate appearances, going 1-for-13 (.077) with four strikeouts. Cabrera was released following the season on February 16, 2026.

=== Delfines de La Guaira ===
In 2026, Cabrera signed with the Delfines de La Guaira of the Venezuelan Major League.

== See also ==
- List of Major League Baseball players from Venezuela
