= Luis Jiménez (first baseman) =

Venezuelan baseball player (born 1982)

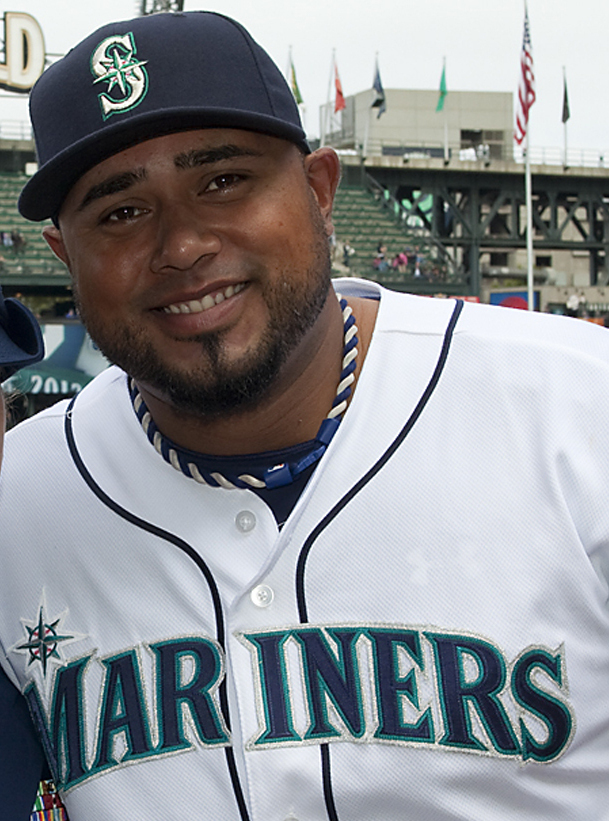
- Jiménez with the Seattle Mariners in 2012

Senadores de Caracas
- First baseman / Coach
- Born: May 7, 1982 (age 44); Barquisimeto, Venezuela
- Batted: Left Threw: Left

Professional debut
- NPB: April 3, 2009, for the Hokkaido Nippon-Ham Fighters
- MLB: September 4, 2012, for the Seattle Mariners
- KBO: April 10, 2014, for the Lotte Giants

Last appearance
- NPB: June 8, 2009, for the Hokkaido Nippon-Ham Fighters
- MLB: September 23, 2012, for the Seattle Mariners
- KBO: 2014, for the Lotte Giants

NPB statistics
- Batting average: .231
- Home runs: 5
- Runs batted in: 14

MLB statistics
- Batting average: .059
- Home runs: 0
- Runs batted in: 0

KBO statistics
- Batting average: .315
- Home runs: 14
- Runs batted in: 61
- Stats at Baseball Reference

Teams
- Hokkaido Nippon-Ham Fighters (2009); Seattle Mariners (2012); Lotte Giants (2014)

Luis Antonio Jiménez Camacaro (born May 7, 1982) is a Venezuelan former professional baseball first baseman. He played for the Seattle Mariners in Major League Baseball (MLB), the Hokkaido Nippon-Ham Fighters in Nippon Professional Baseball (NPB), and the Lotte Giants in the KBO League. Jiménez threw and batted left-handed. He is the hitting coach for the Senadores de Caracas of the Venezuelan Major League.

== Playing career ==
Jimenez signed with the Oakland Athletics on January 18, 1999. He played for various minor league teams for the A's, Baltimore Orioles, Los Angeles Dodgers, and Minnesota Twins before he signed with the Boston Red Sox on a minor league contract on February 1, 2006. With the Portland Sea Dogs in 2006, Jiménez hit 17 home runs and batted in 70 runs, with a .276 batting average. The Red Sox organization re-signed him to a minor league contract on December 20, 2006, and invited him to participate in spring training. During the 2007 season as a member of the Bowie Baysox, he hit 22 home runs while batting .328. On November 27, the Washington Nationals signed him to a minor league contract. He began the 2008 season with the Double-A Harrisburg Senators and became a free agent at the end of the season.

=== Hokkaido Nippon-Ham Fighters ===
Jiménez signed with the Hokkaido Nippon-Ham Fighters of Nippon Professional Baseball for the 2009 season. He became a free agent after the season.

=== Seattle Mariners ===
On January 4, 2012, Jiménez signed a minor league contract with the Seattle Mariners organization. On September 4, the Mariners selected Jiménez's contract, adding him to their active roster. In seven appearances for Seattle, he went 1-for-17 (.059) with no home runs, no RBI, and one walk. On October 25, Jiménez was removed from the 40-man roster and sent outright to the Triple-A Tacoma Rainiers.

=== Toronto Blue Jays ===
On December 11, 2012, the Toronto Blue Jays announced that Jiménez had been signed to a minor league contract with an invitation to major league spring training. Jiménez started the 2013 season with the Triple-A Buffalo Bisons. He was named International League 'Batter of the Week' for April 15 to 21. His week included eight RBI in one game.

=== Lotte Giants ===
Jiménez signed with the Lotte Giants of the KBO League for the 2014 season. He became a free agent following the season.

=== Mexican Baseball League ===
On July 6, 2015, Jiménez signed with the Diablos Rojos del México of the Mexican League. He was released on April 2, 2017.

On May 3, 2018, Jiménez signed with the Guerreros de Oaxaca of the Mexican League. He was released on July 3.

== International career ==
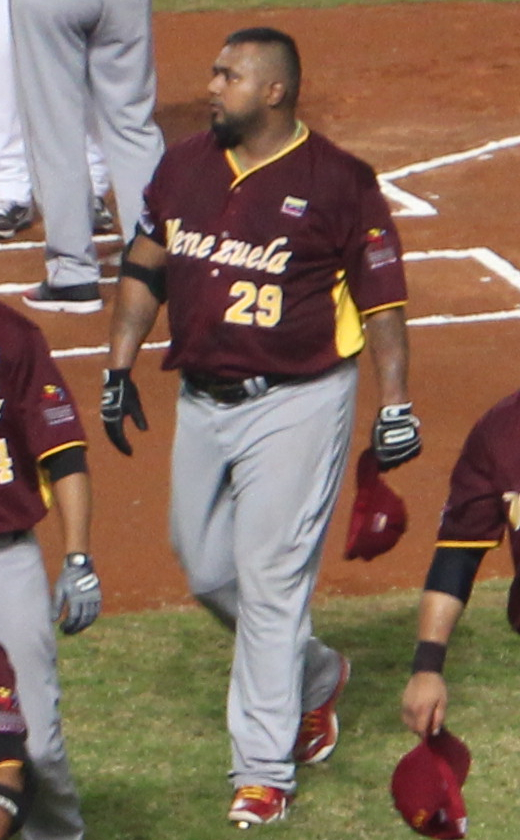
Jiménez with the Venezuela national team in 2015 WBSC Premier12 warm-up game

Jiménez was selected to the roster for the Venezuela national baseball team at the 2015 WBSC Premier12.

== See also ==
- List of Major League Baseball players from Venezuela
