= Henry Rodríguez (infielder) =

Venezuelan baseball player (born 1990)

Senadores de Caracas – No. 9
- Infielder
- Born: February 9, 1990 (age 36); Maracay, Venezuela
- Bats: Switch Throws: Right

MLB debut
- September 2, 2012, for the Cincinnati Reds

MLB statistics (through 2013 season)
- Batting average: .174
- Home runs: 0
- Runs batted in: 2
- Stats at Baseball Reference

Teams
- Cincinnati Reds (2012–2013)

Henry Alejandro (Munoz) Rodríguez (born February 9, 1990) is a Venezuelan professional baseball infielder for the Senadores de Caracas of the Venezuelan Major League. He is 5'10" and weighs 150 lbs. He is a switch hitting batter that throws right handed. He has previously played in Major League Baseball (MLB) for the Cincinnati Reds.

== Career ==
=== Cincinnati Reds ===
The Cincinnati Reds signed Rodríguez as an amateur free agent in 2007. He played 42 games for rookie–level Gulf Coast League Reds in 2009, hitting .322 with one home run, 19 RBI and 9 stolen bases. Rodríguez played in 130 games for the Single–A Dayton Dragons and High–A Lynchburg Hillcats in 2010, hitting .305 with 14 home runs and 82 RBI, while being named a Midwest League All-Star for Dayton. In 2011, he had 566 at–bats for the Single–A Bakersfield Blaze and Double–A Carolina Mudcats, hitting .320 with 13 home runs and 81 RBI. On November 18, 2011, the Reds added Rodríguez to their 40-man roster to protect him from the Rule 5 draft.

Rodríguez began the 2012 season in Double–A with the Pensacola Blue Wahoos before later being promoted to Triple–A. On September 1, 2012, Rodríguez was promoted to the major leagues for the first time. He made his MLB debut the next day as a pinch hitter against the Houston Astros. In 12 games for Cincinnati in 2012, Rodríguez collected 3 hits in 16 plate appearances along with 2 RBI. He spent the majority of the 2013 season with the Triple–A Louisville Bats, getting 1 hit in 10 plate appearances for the Reds in 2013.

On February 12, 2014, Rodríguez was designated for assignment following the waiver claim of Brett Marshall. Rodríguez was released by the Reds organization on March 11.

On December 16, 2014, Rodríguez signed a minor league contract with the Boston Red Sox organization. The Red Sox released Rodríguez on April 3, 2015.

=== Mexican League ===
On April 20, 2015, Rodríguez signed with the Delfines de Ciudad del Carmen of the Mexican League. He hit .359/.406/.535 in 95 games for the club in 2015. On June 28, 2016, Rodríguez was traded to the Piratas de Campeche of the Mexican League. In 23 games with Campeche, Rodríguez slashed .353/.378/.518 with 3 home runs and 21 RBI. On October 3, 2016, Rodríguez was traded back to the Delfines de Ciudad del Carmen. He became a free agent after the 2016 season after the Delfines folded. Rodríguez signed with the Generales de Durango of the Mexican League for the 2017 season. He hit .288/.331/.393 in 80 games for the team, along with 5 home runs and 35 RBI.

On July 12, 2017, Rodríguez was traded to the Piratas de Campeche. In 2017, Rodríguez slashed .297/.379/.538 in 23 contests. In 2018, he hit 9 home runs with 58 RBI on the season. He became a free agent after the 2018 season. On April 6, 2019, Rodríguez signed with the Piratas for the 2019 season. He batted .323/.372/.532 in 114 games for Campeche in 2019, along with 23 home runs and 99 RBI. He did not play in a game in 2020 due to the cancellation of the LMB season because of the COVID-19 pandemic. Rodríguez was released on April 30, 2021.

On June 1, 2021, Rodríguez signed with the Tigres de Quintana Roo of the Mexican League. In 21 games for the team, Rodríguez slashed .247/.306/.312 with 1 home run and 12 RBI. He was released by the Tigres on June 25, 2021. On June 29, 2021, Rodríguez signed with the Rieleros de Aguascalientes of the Mexican League. He played in 29 games for Aguascalientes to close out the year, hitting .437/.455/.660 with 6 home runs, 21 RBI, and 4 stolen bases. In 2022, Rodríguez played in 86 games for the Rieleros, slashing .354/.435/.581 with 20 home runs, 61 RBI, and 9 stolen bases. He was released by the team on February 27, 2023.

On April 19, 2023, Rodríguez signed with the Algodoneros de Unión Laguna of the Mexican League. He was released on December 1. In 51 games he slashed .279/.329/.407 with 5 HR and 32 RBI.

On December 4, 2023, Rodríguez signed with the Piratas de Campeche of the Mexican League. In 35 games, he batted .261/.367/.378 with three home runs and 10 RBI. Rodríguez was released on May 27, 2024.

On May 31, 2024, Rodríguez signed with the Dorados de Chihuahua of the Mexican League. In 35 games for Chihuahua, he slashed .285/.348/.390 with two home runs and 11 RBI. Rodríguez was released by the Dorados on November 19.

=== Senadores de Caracas ===
In 2025, Rodriguez signed with the Senadores de Caracas of the Venezuelan Major League.
