= Jorge Rondón =

Venezuelan baseball player (born 1988)

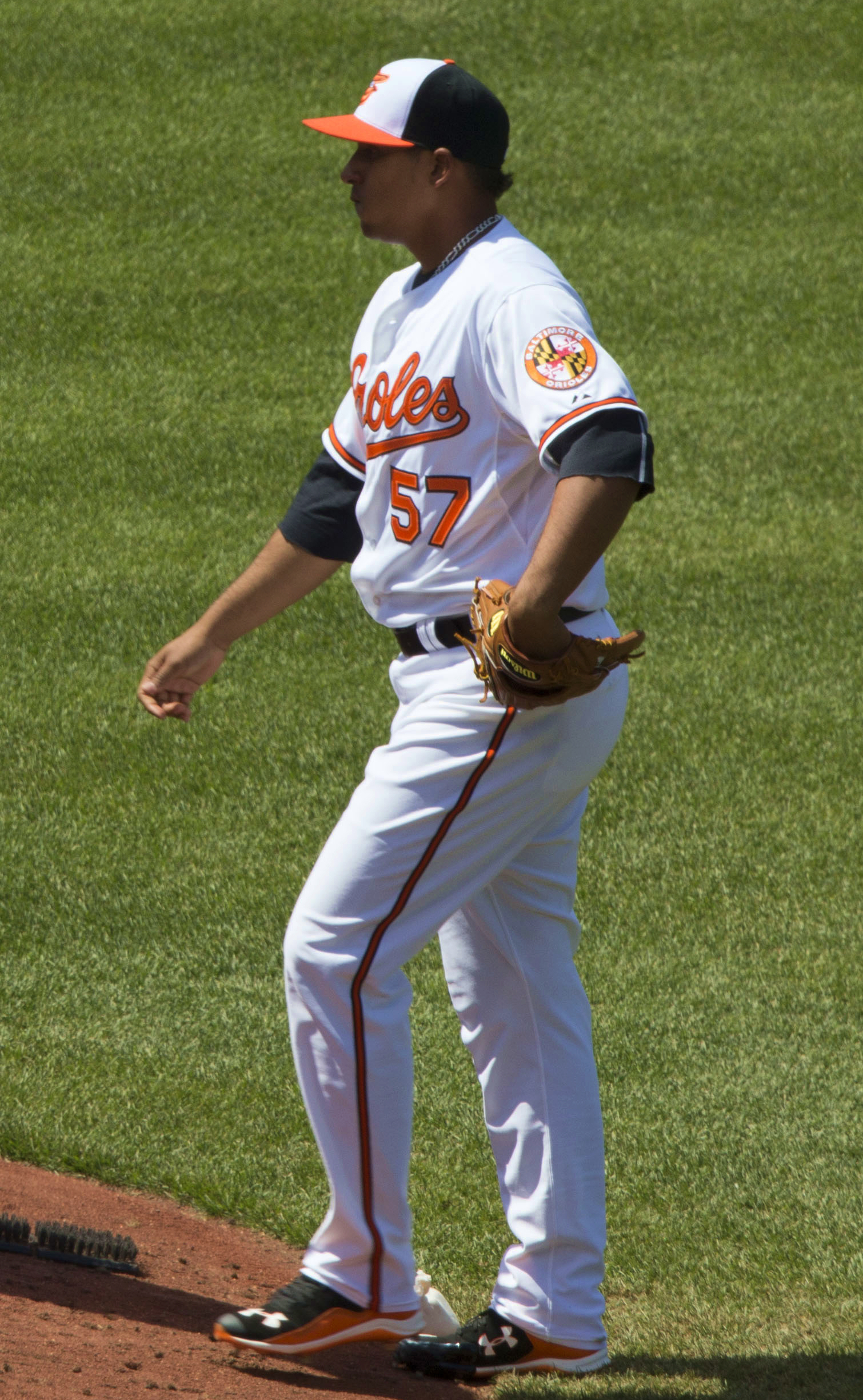
- Rondón with the Baltimore Orioles

Senadores de Caracas – No. 44
- Pitcher
- Born: February 16, 1988 (age 38); Calabozo, Venezuela
- Bats: Right Throws: Right

Professional debut
- MLB: June 29, 2014, for the St. Louis Cardinals
- NPB: May 30, 2017, for the Chunichi Dragons

MLB statistics (through 2015 season)
- Win–loss record: 0–1
- Earned run average: 13.26
- Strikeouts: 13

NPB statistics (through 2017 season)
- Win–loss record: 0-0
- Earned run average: 5.79
- Strikeouts: 4
- Stats at Baseball Reference

Teams
- St. Louis Cardinals (2014); Colorado Rockies (2015); Baltimore Orioles (2015); Pittsburgh Pirates (2016); Chunichi Dragons (2017)

Jorge Leonardo Rondón Hernandez (born February 16, 1988) is a Venezuelan professional baseball pitcher for the Senadores de Caracas of the Venezuelan Major League. He has previously played in Major League Baseball (MLB) for the St. Louis Cardinals, Colorado Rockies, Baltimore Orioles, and Pittsburgh Pirates, and in Nippon Professional Baseball (NPB) for the Chunichi Dragons.

== Career ==
=== St. Louis Cardinals ===
Rondón began pitching professionally for the Cardinals when he was 18. From 2006 to 2011, he played on various rookie league and A-level teams. He received his first promotion to the Double–A Springfield Cardinals in 2011. The promotion coincided with increased strikeouts per 9 innings pitched (K/9) rates. With Palm Beach of the Florida State League that year, he posted a then-professional high of 9.1 K/9 in 26 2/3 innings pitched (IP). He yielded a 4.05 earned run average (ERA), 29 hits and 13 walks (BB).

Rondón split the 2012 season between Springfield and the Triple-A affiliate, the Memphis Redbirds, posting a 3.49 ERA in 49 innings with 50 strikeouts. On October 30, 2012, the Cardinals added Rondón to the 40-man roster to prevent him from becoming a minor league free agent.

The club optioned him to Triple–A Memphis on March 11, 2013. He spent the entire 2013 season at Memphis, appearing in 51 games, pitching 67 innings and allowing a 3.06 ERA. He allowed 72 hits, 37 BB and struck out 42 (SO).

The Cardinals recalled Rondón and Eric Fornataro from Memphis on April 17, 2014, when they moved Joe Kelly to the 15-day disabled list (DL). However, he did not appear in a game before being optioned to Triple–A to clear a roster spot for top prospect Oscar Taveras.

=== Colorado Rockies ===
Rondón was claimed off waivers by the Colorado Rockies on November 3, 2014. He made 2 appearances for Colorado in 2015, but surrendered 11 runs (10 earned) on 8 hits in one inning pitched. On May 2, 2015, Rondón was designated for assignment following the promotion of Ken Roberts.

=== Baltimore Orioles ===
On May 10, 2015, Rondón was claimed off waivers by the Baltimore Orioles. In 30 appearances for the Triple–A Norfolk Tides, he logged a 2.33 ERA with 46 strikeouts in 54.0 innings. However, in 8 contests for Baltimore, Rondón struggled to a 7.43 ERA with 8 strikeouts in 13 1/3 innings of work.

=== Pittsburgh Pirates ===
Rondón was claimed off waivers by the Pittsburgh Pirates on October 26, 2015. On December 13, Rondón was removed from the 40-man roster and sent outright to the Triple-A Indianapolis Indians. Rondón began the 2016 season with Indianapolis, and was promoted to the major leagues on June 19, 2016. In 2 appearances for the Pirates, he allowed 7 runs on 9 hits with 4 strikeouts over 3 2/3 innings pitched. On June 24, Rondón was designated for assignment. He cleared waivers and was sent outright to Indianapolis on July 4.

=== Chunichi Dragons ===
On December 13, 2016, Rondon signed a minor league deal with the Chicago White Sox. On January 7, 2017, Rondon was released to pursue pitching opportunities in Japan.

Following his release from the White Sox, he signed with the Chunichi Dragons in Japan's Nippon Professional Baseball. In 4 games for Chunichi, Rondón recorded a 5.79 ERA with 4 strikeouts across 4 2/3 innings pitched.

=== Chicago White Sox (second stint) ===
On January 11, 2018, Rondón signed a minor league contract with the Chicago White Sox. In 9 appearances for the Double-A Birmingham Barons, he posted an 0–1 record and 4.85 ERA with 14 strikeouts over 13 innings of work. Rondón was released by the White Sox organization on May 10.

=== Rieleros de Aguascalientes ===
On January 10, 2020, Rondón signed with the Rieleros de Aguascalientes of the Mexican League. On April 22, Rondón was released.

On March 15, 2021, Rondón re-signed with Aguascalientes. In 29 appearances for the Rieleros, he logged a 2–4 record and 4.40 ERA with 27 strikeouts and 7 saves across 28 2/3 innings of relief.

=== Leones de Yucatán ===
On June 1, 2022, Rondón was traded to the Leones de Yucatán of the Mexican League. Appearing in 29 games down the stretch, he logged a pristine 1.44 ERA with 20 strikeouts and two saves in 31 1/3 innings pitched. Rondón won the Mexican League Championship with the Leones in 2022.

Rondón returned to the team the following season, but struggled to a 1–3 record with a 6.75 ERA and 11 strikeouts in 13 1/3 innings. He was released on May 20, 2023.

=== Rieleros de Aguascalientes (second stint) ===
On July 8, 2023, Rondón signed with the Rieleros de Aguascalientes of the Mexican League. He made 9 scoreless appearances for Aguascalientes, striking out 6 batters and recording 3 saves in 8 1/3 innings of work.

=== Sultanes de Monterrey ===
On August 1, 2023, Rondón was loaned to the Sultanes de Monterrey for the rest of the 2023 season. He appeared in one game, allowing one hit in one inning pitched.

Rondón made 41 appearances for Monterrey in 2024, compiling a 2–1 record and 3.35 ERA with 22 strikeouts and 5 saves across 40 1/3 innings of relief.

=== Bravos de León ===
On February 25, 2025, Rondón and Jermaine Palacios were traded to the Bravos de León of the Mexican League in exchange for infielder Gustavo Núñez. In six appearances for León, he struggled to an 11.25 ERA with one strikeout in four innings. Rondón was released by the Bravos on May 2.

=== Toros de Tijuana ===
On May 3, 2025, Rondón was claimed off waivers by the Toros de Tijuana of the Mexican League. In five appearances for Tijuana, he struggled to a 9.82 ERA with two strikeouts and four walks over 3 2/3 innings pitched. Rondón was released by the Toros on May 18.

=== Senadores de Caracas ===
On June 1, 2025, Rondón signed with the Senadores de Caracas of the Venezuelan Major League.

== See also ==
- List of Major League Baseball players from Venezuela
