= Carlos Mendoza (outfielder) =

Venezuelan baseball player (born 1974)

Líderes de Miranda
- Outfielder / Coach
- Born: November 4, 1974 (age 51); Ciudad Bolívar, Venezuela
- Batted: Left Threw: Left

MLB debut
- September 3, 1997, for the New York Mets

Last MLB appearance
- September 30, 2000, for the Colorado Rockies

MLB statistics
- Batting average: .182
- Home runs: 0
- Runs batted in: 1
- Stats at Baseball Reference

Teams
- New York Mets (1997); Colorado Rockies (2000)

Carlos Ramón Mendoza (born November 4, 1974) is a Venezuelan former professional baseball outfielder. He is the hitting coach for the Líderes de Miranda of the Venezuelan Major League.

== Career ==
Mendoza previously played parts of two seasons in the majors with the New York Mets (1997) and Colorado Rockies (2000), primarily as an outfielder. Listed at 5.11 (1.80 m), 160 lb (72 k), Mendoza batted and threw left-handed. He was born in Ciudad Bolívar, Venezuela.

In a two-season MLB career, Mendoza hit .182 with one run batted in and no home runs in 28 games played.

In between, Mendoza played winterball with the Navegantes del Magallanes and Caribes de Oriente clubs of the Venezuelan League from 1994 through 2004. In addition, he represented his country in the 1999 Caribbean Series tournament, where he led all hitters with a .529 average and was included in the All-Star team.

== See also ==
- List of Major League Baseball players from Venezuela
