= Eduardo Jiménez (baseball) =

Venezuelan baseball player (born 1995)

Senadores de Caracas – No. 29
- Pitcher
- Born: April 4, 1995 (age 31); Cumaná, Venezuela
- Batted: Right Threw: Right

MLB debut
- May 7, 2019, for the Detroit Tigers

Last MLB appearance
- August 7, 2019, for the Detroit Tigers

MLB statistics
- Win–loss record: 0–0
- Earned run average: 5.91
- Strikeouts: 8
- Stats at Baseball Reference

Teams
- Detroit Tigers (2019)

Eduardo Rafael Jiménez (born April 4, 1995) is a Venezuelan professional baseball pitcher for the Senadores de Caracas of the Venezuelan Major League. He has played in Major League Baseball (MLB) for the Detroit Tigers.

== Career ==
=== Detroit Tigers ===
Jiménez signed with the Detroit Tigers as an intentional free agent on July 11, 2011. He made his professional debut in 2012 with the Venezuelan Summer League Tigers, going 0–5 with a 3.61 ERA in 42 1/3 innings. He returned to the VSL Tigers in 2013, going 4–2 with a 3.21 ERA in 61 2/3 innings. He underwent Tommy John surgery and missed the 2014 season. In 2015 after finishing his rehab, he appeared in 4 games for the Gulf Coast League Tigers, pitching 5 scoreless innings. He played for the Connecticut Tigers in 2016, going 0–0 with a 2.70 ERA in 13 innings. He split the 2017 season between the West Michigan Whitecaps and the Lakeland Flying Tigers, combining to go 1–2 with a 2.13 ERA in 50 2/3 innings. While with West Michigan that season, he was suspended 30 game for his actions during an on-field brawl where he threw a baseball at opposing players, striking one player in the leg. He returned to Lakeland and spent the 2018 season there, going 3–4 with a 3.42 ERA in 50 innings. He played for the Mesa Solar Sox of the Arizona Fall League during the 2018 offseason.

On November 20, 2017, the Tigers added Jiménez to their 40-man roster to protect him from the Rule 5 draft. He began the 2019 season playing for the Erie SeaWolves and the Toledo Mud Hens. On May 5, the Detroit Tigers called up Jiménez to replace Drew VerHagen, who was designated for assignment. He made his major league debut on May 7, pitching a scoreless inning in relief. He was sent back down to Toledo three days later. Jiménez was outrighted off the Tigers roster on October 23. He elected free agency following the season on November 4.

=== Arizona Diamondbacks ===
On December 12, 2019, Jiménez signed a minor league contract with the Arizona Diamondbacks organization. He did not play in a game in 2020 due to the cancellation of the minor league season because of the COVID-19 pandemic. Jiménez became a free agent on November 2, 2020.
