= Alex Delgado =

Venezuelan baseball player (born 1971)

Senadores de Caracas
- Catcher / Manager
- Born: January 11, 1971 (age 55); Palmarejo, Zulia, Venezuela
- Batted: Right Threw: Right

MLB debut
- April 4, 1996, for the Boston Red Sox

Last MLB appearance
- July 12, 1996, for the Boston Red Sox

MLB statistics
- Batting average: .250
- Home runs: 0
- Runs batted in: 5
- Stats at Baseball Reference

Teams
- Boston Red Sox (1996)

Alexander Delgado (born January 11, 1971) is a Venezuelan former catcher in Major League Baseball who played with the Boston Red Sox in their 1996 season. Listed at 6' 0", 160 lb., Delgado batted and threw right-handed. He was born in Palmarejo, Zulia. He is the manager of the Senadores de Caracas of the Venezuelan Major League.

== Career ==
In a 26-game career, Delgado posted a batting average of .250 (5-for-20) with one RBI and five runs without home runs.

Delgado also spent 18 seasons in the Minor Leagues, mostly in the Red Sox system, and had stints in the Mexican League with the Rieleros de Aguascalientes and Olmecas de Tabasco.

In between, Delgado played winter ball with four clubs of the Venezuelan League during 23 seasons spanning 1988–2011.

His teammates dubbed him El Señor de los Anillos (The Lord of the Rings), as he was a member of 11 champion teams while collecting the most Championship Series rings of any player in Venezuelan professional baseball history. Additionally, he caught for the Tigres de Aragua club that clinched the 2009 Caribbean Series title.

A dependable and durable catcher for 23 years, Delgado played more than 2,000 games in his career before retiring in 2011 at the age of 40.

== See also ==
- List of Major League Baseball players from Venezuela

== See also ==
- Boston Red Sox all-time roster
- List of players from Venezuela in Major League Baseball

== Sources ==
- Baseball Almanac
- Baseball Reference
- Retrosheet
- Gutiérrez, Daniel; Alvarez, Efraim; Gutiérrez (h), Daniel (2006). La Enciclopedia del Béisbol en Venezuela. LVBP, Caracas. ISBN 980-6996-02-X
