= Mayckol Guaipe =

Venezuelan baseball player (born 1990)

Senadores de Caracas – No. 57
- Pitcher
- Born: August 11, 1990 (age 36); Barcelona, Anzoátegui, Venezuela
- Batted: Right Threw: Right

MLB debut
- June 1, 2015, for the Seattle Mariners

Last MLB appearance
- May 14, 2016, for the Seattle Mariners

MLB statistics
- Win–loss record: 0–3
- Earned run average: 5.29
- Strikeouts: 27
- Stats at Baseball Reference

Teams
- Seattle Mariners (2015–2016)

Mayckol Guaipe (Spanish pronunciation: [ˈmajkol ˈɣwajpe]; born August 11, 1990) is a Venezuelan professional baseball pitcher for the Senadores de Caracas of the Venezuelan Major League. He played in Major League Baseball (MLB) for the Seattle Mariners in 2015 and 2016.

== Career ==
=== Seattle Mariners ===
Guaipe was signed by the Seattle Mariners as an undrafted free agent in 2006. The Mariners added Guaipe to their 40-man roster on November 20, 2014, in order to protect him from the Rule 5 draft. He made his major league debut against the New York Yankees in relief of Félix Hernández at Safeco Field on June 1, 2015, retiring all seven batters he faced and recording two strikeouts. Guaipe would be optioned back down to the Triple-A Tacoma Rainiers on June 2.

The Mariners released Guaipe on August 4, 2016. He re-signed with the organization on a minor league contract two days later. In 12 games for the Triple-A Tacoma Rainiers, Guaipe compiled a 3.14 ERA with 13 strikeouts and 4 saves across 14 1/3 innings pitched. He elected free agency following the season on November 7.

=== Chicago White Sox ===
On January 27, 2017, the Chicago White Sox signed Guaipe as a free agent. He was released on March 26.

=== Rockland Boulders ===
On May 4, 2017, Guaipe signed with the Rockland Boulders of the Can-Am League.

=== Rojos del Águila de Veracruz ===
Guaipe left Rockland on June 26, 2017 to sign with the Rojos del Águila de Veracruz of the Mexican Baseball League. Guaipe later re-signed with the Rockland Boulders on August 20.

=== Generales de Durango ===
On May 5, 2018, Guaipe signed with the Generales de Durango of the Mexican Baseball League. He was released on July 26, 2019.

=== Venezuelan leagues ===
After the 2019 season, he played for Caribes de Anzoátegui of the Liga Venezolana de Béisbol Profesional(LVMP). He has also played for Venezuela in the 2020 Caribbean Series.

After the 2020 season, he played for Caribes of the LVMP. He has also played for Venezuela in the 2021 Caribbean Series.

In April 2025, Guaipe signed with the Senadores de Caracas of the Venezuelan Major League.

In July, Guaipe was traded to the Delfines de La Guaira of the Venezuelan Major League.

== See also ==
- List of Major League Baseball players from Venezuela
