= Alberto González (baseball) =

Venezuelan baseball player (born 1983)

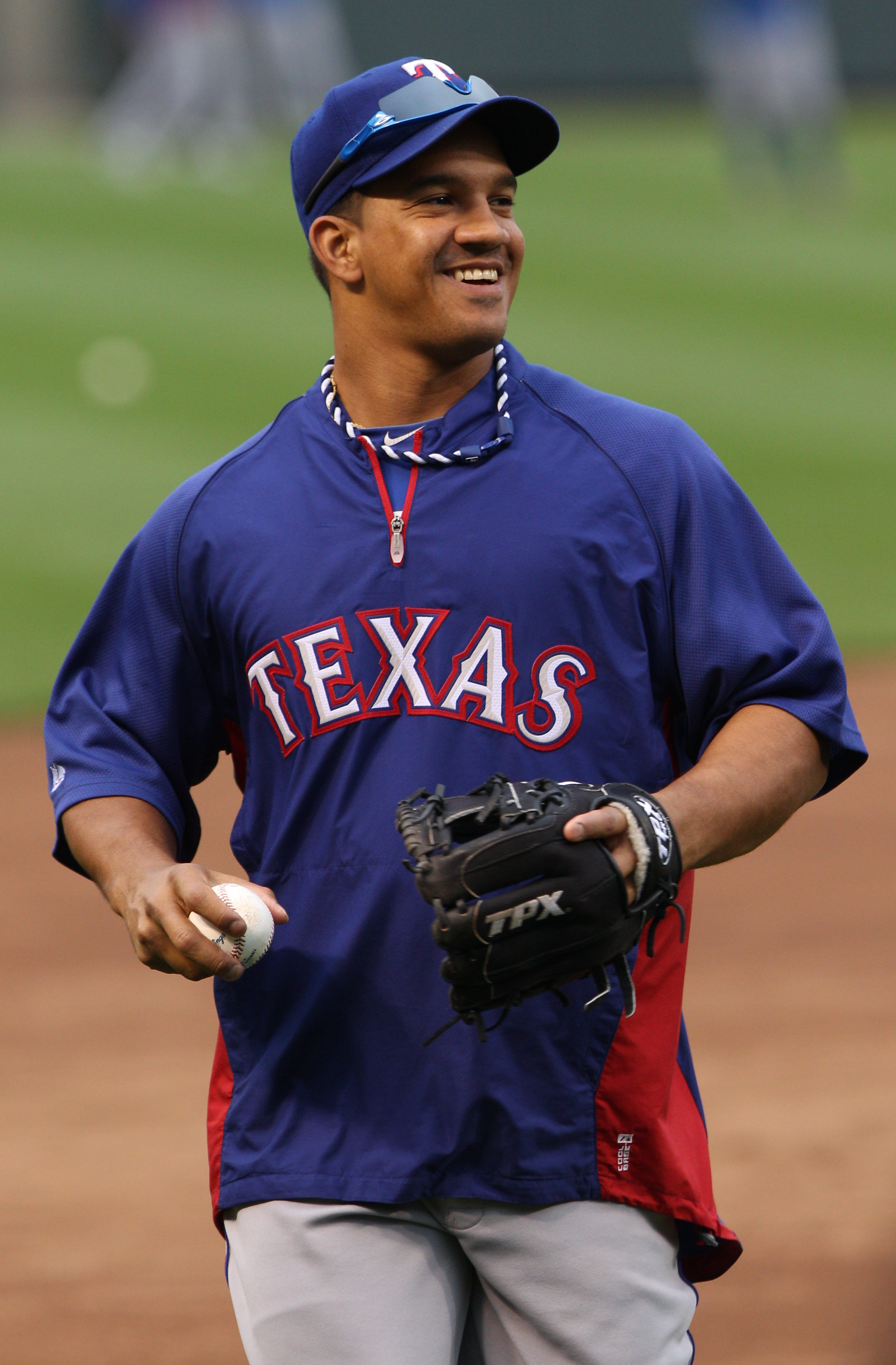
- Gonzalez with the Texas Rangers in 2012

Senadores de Caracas
- Infielder / Coach
- Born: April 18, 1983 (age 43); Maracaibo, Venezuela
- Batted: Right Threw: Right

MLB debut
- September 1, 2007, for the New York Yankees

Last MLB appearance
- July 19, 2013, for the New York Yankees

MLB statistics
- Batting average: .239
- Home runs: 4
- Runs batted in: 91
- Stats at Baseball Reference

Teams
- New York Yankees (2007–2008); Washington Nationals (2008–2010); San Diego Padres (2011); Texas Rangers (2012); Chicago Cubs (2013); New York Yankees (2013)

Alberto Ramón González (born April 18, 1983) is a Venezuelan former professional baseball infielder. He played in Major League Baseball (MLB) for the New York Yankees, Washington Nationals, San Diego Padres, Texas Rangers, and Chicago Cubs. He currently serves as the first base coach for the Senadores de Caracas of the Venezuelan Major League.

== Professional career ==
=== Arizona Diamondbacks ===
González was signed as an undrafted free agent by the Arizona Diamondbacks on August 3, 2002. He spent his first three years in the minors, playing for the Single-A South Bend Silver Hawks in 2004 and 2005, and the Double-A Tennessee Smokies and Triple-A Tucson Sidewinders in 2006.

=== New York Yankees ===
On January 5, 2007, González was traded with pitchers Luis Vizcaíno, Ross Ohlendorf, and Steven Jackson to the New York Yankees in exchange for Randy Johnson. González began the 2007 season with the Triple-A Scranton/Wilkes-Barre Yankees, but was demoted to the Trenton Thunder after struggling.

The Yankees called up González on September 1, 2007, as part of the September expanded rosters. He made his major league debut that day as a defensive replacement. On September 8, he recorded his first RBI by grounding into a fielder's choice and later scored his first run. On April 9, 2008, González was called up to provide back-up for injured Derek Jeter. He took the roster spot of Shelley Duncan.

=== Washington Nationals ===
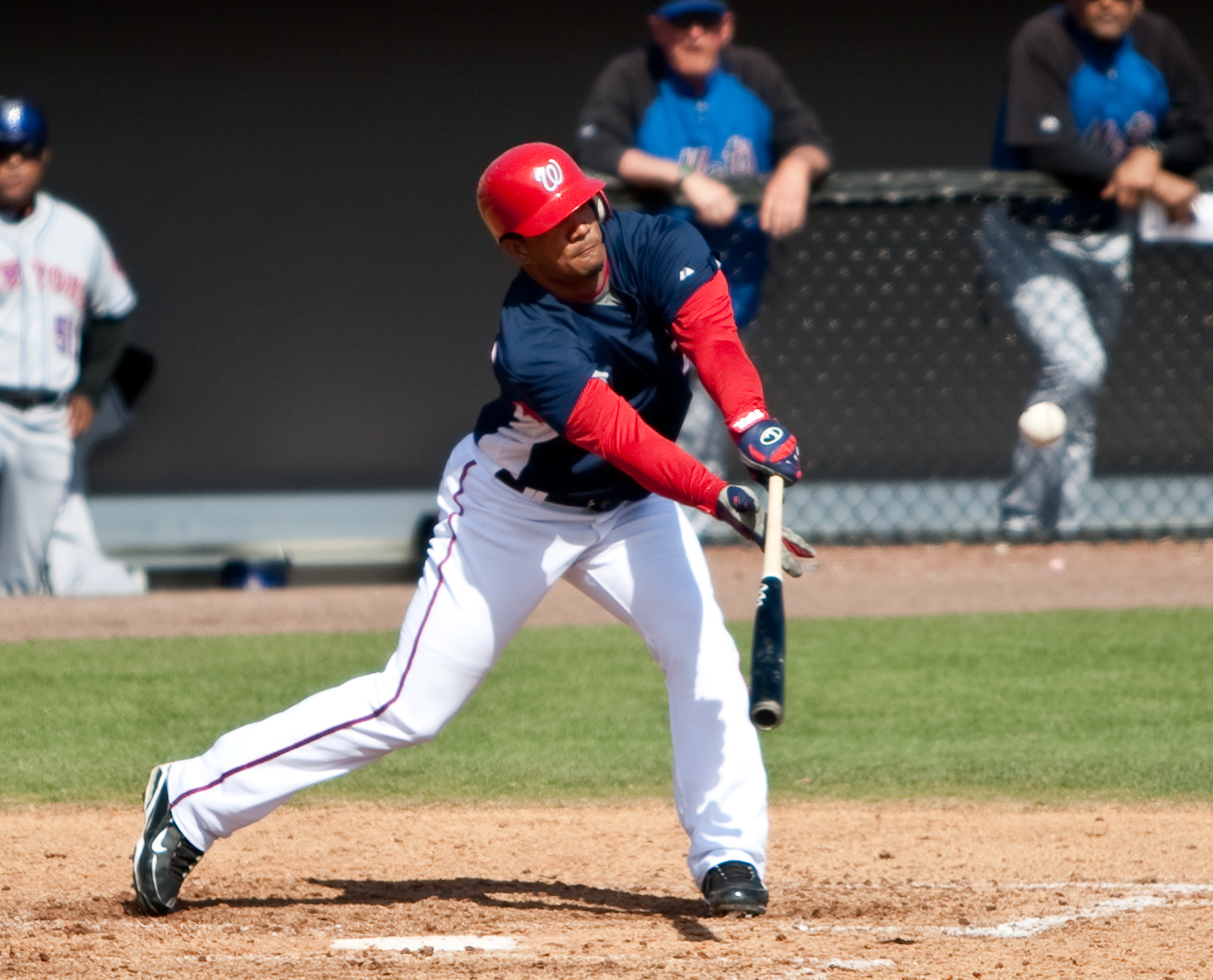
González batting for the Nationals in 2009 spring training.

On July 31, 2008, González was traded to the Washington Nationals in exchange for minor league right-handed pitcher Jhonny Núñez. He spent the whole of his three years in Washington as a reserve infielder.

=== San Diego Padres ===
On March 28, 2011, González was traded to the San Diego Padres in exchange for minor league pitcher Erik Davis and cash considerations. He was released by San Diego on November 17.

=== Texas Rangers ===
The Texas Rangers signed González to a minor league contract on December 9, 2011. He also received an invitation to spring training; as a result of his performance during spring training he was added to the major league roster as a backup infielder. González was designated for assignment on August 10, 2012 to make room for Mark Lowe on the active roster.

In October 2012, González elected minor league free agency. In 24 games with the Rangers, González hit .241/.241/.315 with 4 RBI and seven runs.

=== Chicago Cubs ===
On November 21, 2012, González signed a minor league contract with the Chicago Cubs that included an invitation to spring training. He made the team's Opening Day roster. González was designated for assignment by Chicago on April 19, 2013.

=== New York Yankees (second stint) ===
On May 10, 2013, González was traded by the Cubs back to the New York Yankees in exchange for cash considerations or a player to be named later. He was initially assigned to Triple-A when acquired, but was called up on May 12 when Eduardo Núñez went on the disabled list. On May 15, González pitched for the first time on the mound in the top of the ninth inning against the Seattle Mariners getting the third out with a fly out. González was designated for assignment on May 18 after the Yankees acquired Reid Brignac, He cleared waivers and was sent outright to the Triple-A Scranton/Wilkes-Barre RailRiders on May 21. González recalled again on June 21 after Brignac was designated for assignment.

=== San Diego Padres (second stint) ===
On December 2, 2013, González was signed to a minor league contract with the San Diego Padres. He was released by the Padres organization on April 23, 2014.

=== Wichita Wingnuts ===
González signed with the Wichita Wingnuts of the American Association of Independent Professional Baseball to begin the 2015 season.

=== Detroit Tigers ===
On June 27, 2015, González signed a minor-league deal with the Detroit Tigers, and he was assigned to Double A Erie SeaWolves. On December 23, the Tigers re-signed González to a minor league contract. He was released on June 2, 2016.

=== Guerreros de Oaxaca ===
On June 7, 2016, González signed with the Guerreros de Oaxaca of the Mexican League. In 53 appearances for Oaxaca, he batted .290/.342/.390 with two home runs, 20 RBI, and two stolen bases. González was released by the Guerreros on September 23.

González retired from professional baseball after the 2024 season, following a stint with the Bravos de Margarita of the Venezuelan Professional Baseball League.

== See also ==
- List of players from Venezuela in Major League Baseball
