= Carlos García (baseball) =

Venezuelan baseball player (born 1967)

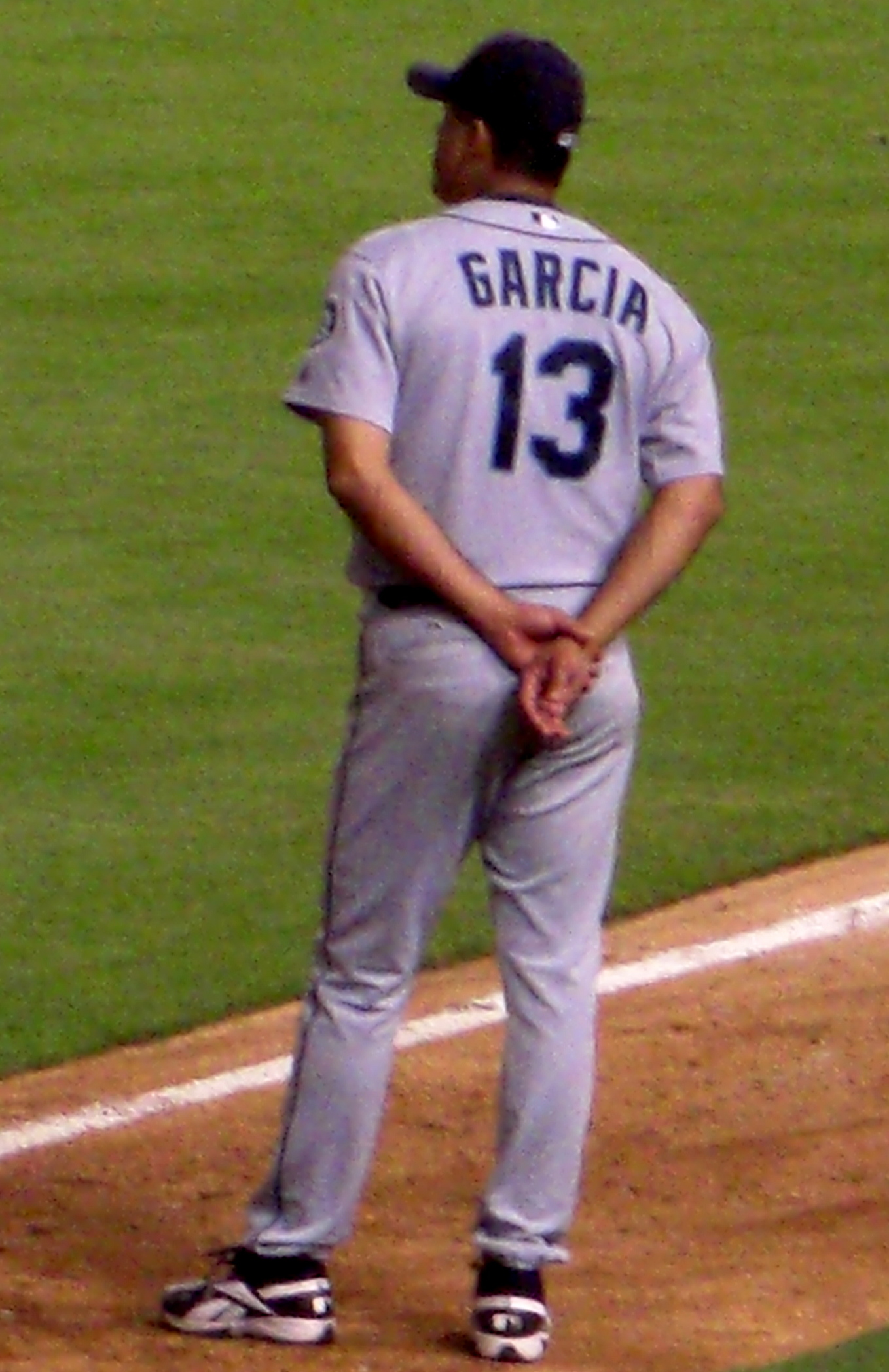
- García with the Seattle Mariners in 2007

Líderes de Miranda
- Second baseman / Manager
- Born: October 15, 1967 (age 58); San Cristóbal, Táchira, Venezuela
- Batted: Right Threw: Right

MLB debut
- September 20, 1990, for the Pittsburgh Pirates

Last MLB appearance
- April 15, 1999, for the San Diego Padres

MLB statistics
- Batting average: .266
- Home runs: 33
- Runs batted in: 197
- Stats at Baseball Reference

Teams
- As player: Pittsburgh Pirates (1990–1996); Toronto Blue Jays (1997); Anaheim Angels (1998); San Diego Padres (1999); As coach: Seattle Mariners (2005–2007); Pittsburgh Pirates (2010)

Career highlights and awards
- All-Star (1994)

Carlos Jesús García Guerrero (born October 15, 1967) is a Venezuelan former professional baseball second baseman who played for the Pittsburgh Pirates (1990–1996), Toronto Blue Jays (1997), Anaheim Angels (1998) and San Diego Padres (1999). He is a former manager of the Pirates' Double-A affiliate, the Altoona Curve. In 2018, he became manager of the Acereros de Monclova of the Mexican League. Since 2021, he has managed Líderes de Miranda of the Venezuelan Major League.

== Playing career ==
García signed as an amateur free agent with the Pirates in January 1987. He was an Eastern League All-Star in 1990. He made his MLB debut later that year, splitting three season between Pittsburgh and their Triple-A affiliate, the Buffalo Bisons. He had his best season at Buffalo in 1992, batting .303, with 13 home runs and 70 runs batted in (RBIs). Originally a shortstop, the Pirates' trade of José Lind offered García an opportunity at second base, as Jay Bell was entrenched at shortstop. In 1993, he was third among National League (NL) rookies in hits and stolen bases. His first MLB home run was an inside-the-park home run off Orel Hershiser of the Los Angeles Dodgers. He was the Pirates' lone representative at the 1994 MLB All-Star game; he singled in one of his two at-bats. He had a career-best .294 batting average in 1995.

In November 1996, García was traded with Orlando Merced and Dan Plesac to the Toronto Blue Jays for José Silva, two minor leaguers, and players to be named later, who included Abraham Núñez and Craig Wilson. García finished his career with single seasons with the Blue Jays, Anaheim Angels and San Diego Padres. In a 610-game MLB career, García hit .266 with 33 homers, 197 RBI, 274 runs scored, 102 doubles, 17 triples, and 73 stolen bases.

== Coaching career ==
García served as the first base and third base coach for the Seattle Mariners from 2005 through 2007. He served as the first base coach and infield instructor for the Pittsburgh Pirates in 2010.

Carlos was named the manager of the Bradenton Marauders, the Class High-A affiliate of the Pirates, in December 2010. In 2013, he was promoted as manager of the Pirates' Double-A affiliate, the Altoona Curve. On September 23, 2014, he was fired as the Curve's manager.

García was announced as the hitting coach for the Acereros de Monclova of the Mexican League for the Spring Tournament of the 2018 season. He was promoted to manager for the Fall Tournament of the 2018 season, but left the organization prematurely for personal reasons.

In 2021, García began managing Líderes de Miranda of the Venezuelan Major League. He was named the league's manager of the year in 2024.

García was a coach for the Venezuela national team at the 2019 WBSC Premier12.

== See also ==
- List of Major League Baseball players from Venezuela
