= List of Major League Baseball players from Venezuela =

Baseball list

Since 1939, over 500 Venezuelan baseball players have played in Major League Baseball. This list shows players who appeared in at least one game in MLB, including number indicating order of arrival, name of player, position, starting team, and dates of debut and final game.

Abbreviations for position

- P: Pitcher
- C: Catcher
- 1B: First baseman
- 2B: Second baseman
- 3B: Third baseman
- SS: Shortstop
- IF: Infielder
- OF: Outfielder
- UTIL: Utility player
- AL: American League
- NL: National League
- NML: Negro Leagues

| Number | Name | Pos | Debut team | Date of debut | Final game in MLB |
|---|---|---|---|---|---|
| 1 | Alejandro (Alex) Carrasquel | P | Washington Senators, AL | April 23, 1939 | July 26, 1949 |
| 2 | Jesús (Chucho) Ramos | OF | Cincinnati Reds, NL | May 7, 1944 | May 30, 1944 |
| 3 | Carlos Ascanio | OF | New York Black Yankees, NML | 1946 | 1946 |
| 4 | Alfonso (Chico) Carrasquel; 4× All-Star | SS | Chicago White Sox, AL | April 18, 1950 | September 23, 1959 |
| 5 | Pompeyo (Yo-Yo) Davalillo | SS | Washington Senators, AL | August 1, 1953 | August 23, 1953 |
| 6 | Ramón (Ray) Monzant | P | New York Giants, NL | July 2, 1954 | April 25, 1960 |
| 7 | Luis Aparicio; Hall of Fame, 9× Gold Glove, AL ROY, 13× All-Star | SS | Chicago White Sox, AL | April 17, 1956 | September 28, 1973 |
| 8 | Elio Chacón | 2B | Cincinnati Reds, NL | April 20, 1960 | September 30, 1962 |
| 9 | Víctor (Vic) Davalillo; Gold Glove, All-Star | OF | Cleveland Indians, AL | April 9, 1963 | October 6, 1980 |
| 10 | César Tovar | IF | Minnesota Twins, AL | April 12, 1965 | September 29, 1976 |
| 11 | Gustavo (Gus) Gil | 2B | Cleveland Indians, AL | April 11, 1967 | June 30, 1971 |
| 12 | César Gutiérrez | SS | San Francisco Giants, NL | April 16, 1967 | September 26, 1971 |
| 13 | Roberto (Muñoz) Rodríguez | P | Kansas City Athletics, AL | May 13, 1967 | September 26, 1970 |
| 14 | José Herrera | OF | Houston Astros, NL | June 3, 1967 | April 6, 1970 |
| 15 | Néstor (Isaías) Chávez | P | San Francisco Giants, NL | September 9, 1967 | September 30, 1967 |
| 16 | Remigio (Remy) Hermoso | SS | Atlanta Braves, NL | September 14, 1967 | September 30, 1974 |
| 17 | Ángel Bravo | OF | Chicago White Sox, AL | June 6, 1969 | August 30, 1971 |
| 18 | David Concepción; 5× Gold Glove, 9× All-Star | SS | Cincinnati Reds, NL | April 6, 1970 | September 15, 1988 |
| 19 | Oswaldo (Ozzie) Blanco | 1B | Chicago White Sox, AL | May 26, 1970 | June 9, 1974 |
| 20 | Enzo Hernández | SS | San Diego Padres, NL | April 17, 1971 | August 19, 1978 |
| 21 | Dámaso Blanco | SS | San Francisco Giants, NL | May 26, 1972 | June 2, 1974 |
| 22 | Gonzalo Márquez | 1B | Oakland Athletics, NL | August 11, 1972 | June 5, 1974 |
| 23 | Manny Trillo; 3× Gold Glove, 4× All-Star | 2B | Oakland Athletics, AL | June 28, 1973 | May 20, 1989 |
| 24 | Pablo Torrealba | P | Atlanta Braves, NL | April 9, 1975 | April 12, 1979 |
| 25 | Manuel (Manny) Sarmiento | P | Cincinnati Reds, NL | July 30, 1976 | October 1, 1983 |
| 26 | Antonio (Tony) Armas; 2× All-Star | OF | Pittsburgh Pirates, NL | September 6, 1976 | October 1, 1989 |
| 27 | Baudilio (Bo) Díaz; 2× All-Star | C | Boston Red Sox, AL | September 6, 1977 | July 9, 1989 |
| 28 | Luis Leal | P | Toronto Blue Jays, AL | May 25, 1980 | June 29, 1985 |
| 29 | Luis Salazar | 3B | San Diego Padres, NL | August 15, 1980 | October 4, 1992 |
| 30 | Luis Aponte | P | Boston Red Sox, AL | September 4, 1980 | July 6, 1984 |
| 31 | Luis (Mercedes) Sánchez | P | California Angels, AL | April 10, 1981 | October 6, 1985 |
| 32 | Fred Manrique | 2B | Toronto Blue Jays, AL | August 23, 1981 | May 11, 1991 |
| 33 | Leonardo (Leo) Hernández | 3B | Baltimore Orioles, AL | August 19, 1982 | October 2, 1986 |
| 34 | Angel (Argenis) Salazar | SS | Montreal Expos, NL | August 10, 1983 | October 1, 1988 |
| 35 | Tobías (Toby) Hernández | C | Toronto Blue Jays, AL | June 22, 1984 | September 18, 1984 |
| 36 | Álvaro Espinoza | IF | Minnesota Twins, AL | September 14, 1984 | July 12, 1997 |
| 37 | Oswaldo (Ozzie) Guillén; AL ROY, Gold Glove, 3× All-Star | SS | Chicago White Sox, AL | April 9, 1985 | October 1, 2000 |
| 38 | Urbano Lugo | P | California Angels, AL | April 28, 1985 | May 11, 1990 |
| 39 | Andrés Galarraga; 2× Gold Glove, 5× All-Star | 1B | Montreal Expos, NL | August 23, 1985 | October 3, 2004 |
| 40 | Gustavo (Gus) Polidor | SS | California Angels, AL | September 7, 1985 | July 22, 1993 |
| 41 | Lester Straker | P | Minnesota Twins, AL | April 11, 1987 | October 1, 1988 |
| 42 | Al Pedrique | SS | New York Mets, NL | April 14, 1987 | June 21, 1989 |
| 43 | Miguel Angel García | P | California Angels, AL | April 30, 1987 | July 22, 1989 |
| 44 | Ubaldo Heredia | P | Montreal Expos, NL | May 12, 1987 | May 17, 1987 |
| 45 | Alexis Infante | IF | Toronto Blue Jays, AL | September 27, 1987 | July 15, 1990 |
| 46 | Oswaldo Peraza | P | Baltimore Orioles, AL | April 4, 1988 | September 2, 1988 |
| 47 | Johnny Paredes | 2B | Montreal Expos, NL | April 29, 1988 | October 6, 1991 |
| 48 | Ángel Escobar | IF | San Francisco Giants, NL | May 17, 1988 | May 26, 1988 |
| 49 | Germán González | P | Minnesota Twins, AL | August 5, 1988 | September 25, 1989 |
| 50 | Antonio (Tony) Castillo | P | Toronto Blue Jays, AL | August 14, 1988 | June 19, 1998 |
| 51 | Carlos (Café) Martínez | 3B | Chicago White Sox, AL | September 2, 1988 | July 20, 1995 |
| 52 | Carlos Quintana | 1B | Boston Red Sox, AL | September 16, 1988 | October 3, 1993 |
| 53 | Omar Vizquel; 11× Gold Glove, 3× All-Star | SS | Seattle Mariners, AL | April 3, 1989 | October 3, 2012 |
| 54 | Wilson Álvarez; All-Star | P | Texas Rangers, AL | July 24, 1989 | September 28, 2005 |
| 55 | Julio Machado | P | New York Mets, NL | September 7, 1989 | October 6, 1991 |
| 56 | Carlos A. Hernández | C | Los Angeles Dodgers, NL | April 20, 1990 | October 1, 2000 |
| 57 | Luis Sojo | 2B | Toronto Blue Jays, AL | July 14, 1990 | September 30, 2003 |
| 58 | Oscar Azócar | OF | New York Yankees, AL | July 17, 1990 | October 4, 1992 |
| 59 | Richard (El Guapo) Garcés | P | Minnesota Twins, AL | September 18, 1990 | July 20, 2002 |
| 60 | Carlos García; All-Star | 2B | Pittsburgh Pirates, NL | September 20, 1990 | April 15, 1999 |
| 61 | José Elías Escobar | SS | Cleveland Indians, AL | April 13, 1991 | May 11, 1991 |
| 62 | Ramón García | P | Chicago White Sox, AL | May 31, 1991 | September 26, 1997 |
| 63 | Amalio Carreño | P | Philadelphia Phillies, NL | July 7, 1991 | July 14, 1991 |
| 64 | Danilo León | P | Texas Rangers, AL | June 6, 1992 | August 4, 1992 |
| 65 | Cristóbal (Cris) Colón | SS | Texas Rangers, AL | September 18, 1992 | October 4, 1992 |
| 66 | Willie Cañate | OF | Toronto Blue Jays, AL | April 16, 1993 | October 3, 1993 |
| 67 | Omar Daal | P | Los Angeles Dodgers, NL | April 23, 1993 | September 25, 2003 |
| 68 | Marcos Armas | OF | Oakland Athletics, AL | May 25, 1993 | September 29, 1993 |
| 69 | Pedro Castellano | 3B | Colorado Rockies, NL | May 30, 1993 | June 3, 1996 |
| 70 | Eduardo Zambrano | 1B | Chicago Cubs, NL | September 19, 1993 | August 10, 1994 |
| 71 | Roberto Petagine | 1B | Seattle Mariners, AL | April 4, 1994 | July 8, 2006 |
| 72 | Juan Carlos Pulido | P | Minnesota Twins, AL | April 9, 1994 | April 24, 2004 |
| 73 | Robert Pérez | OF | Toronto Blue Jays, AL | July 20, 1994 | July 2, 2001 |
| 74 | Juan Francisco Castillo | P | New York Mets, NL | July 26, 1994 | July 31, 1994 |
| 75 | Edgardo Alfonzo; All-Star | IF | New York Mets, NL | April 26, 1995 | June 12, 2006 |
| 76 | Felipe Lira | P | Detroit Tigers, AL | April 27, 1995 | May 21, 2001 |
| 77 | Dilson Torres | P | Kansas City Royals, AL | April 29, 1995 | September 27, 1995 |
| 78 | Tomás Pérez | IF | Toronto Blue Jays, AL | May 3, 1995 | April 21, 2008 |
| 79 | Ugueth Urbina; 2× All-Star | P | Montreal Expos, NL | May 9, 1995 | October 2, 2005 |
| 80 | Edwin Hurtado | P | Toronto Blue Jays, AL | May 22, 1995 | July 30, 1997 |
| 81 | Edgar Cáceres | 2B | Kansas City Royals, AL | June 8, 1995 | October 1, 1995 |
| 82 | Roger Cedeño | OF | Los Angeles Dodgers, NL | June 20, 1995 | June 5, 2005 |
| 83 | Giovanni Carrara | P | Toronto Blue Jays, AL | July 29, 1995 | September 23, 2006 |
| 84 | Eddie Pérez | C | Atlanta Braves, NL | August 10, 1995 | September 27, 2005 |
| 85 | Alex Delgado | C | Boston Red Sox, AL | April 4, 1996 | July 12, 1996 |
| 86 | Alex Pacheco | P | Montreal Expos, NL | April 17, 1996 | May 15, 1996 |
| 87 | Miguel Cairo | UTIL | Cincinnati Reds, NL | April 4, 1996 | October 3, 2012 |
| 88 | José Malavé | OF | Boston Red Sox, AL | May 23, 1996 | August 30, 1997 |
| 89 | Robert Machado | C | Chicago White Sox, AL | July 24, 1996 | September 18, 2004 |
| 90 | Raúl Chávez | C | Montreal Expos, NL | August 30, 1996 | September 24, 2009 |
| 91 | Bobby Abreu; Gold Glove, 2× All-Star | RF | Houston Astros, NL | September 1, 1996 | September 28, 2014 |
| 92 | Eddy Díaz | IF | Milwaukee Brewers, AL | April 17, 1997 | May 21, 1997 |
| 93 | Edgar Ramos | P | Philadelphia Phillies, NL | May 5, 1997 | May 30, 1997 |
| 94 | Geremi González | P | Chicago Cubs, NL | May 27, 1997 | September 26, 2006 |
| 95 | Jorge Velandia | IF | San Diego Padres, NL | June 20, 1997 | July 13, 2008 |
| 96 | Kelvim Escobar | P | Toronto Blue Jays, AL | June 29, 1997 | June 6, 2009 |
| 97 | Henry Blanco | C | Chicago Cubs, NL | July 25, 1997 | September 23, 2013 |
| 98 | Magglio Ordóñez; 6× All-Star | RF | Chicago White Sox, AL | August 29, 1997 | September 27, 2011 |
| 99 | Richard Hidalgo | RF | Houston Astros, NL | September 1, 1997 | August 4, 2005 |
| 100 | Luis Ordaz | IF | St. Louis Cardinals, NL | September 3, 1997 | April 3, 2006 |
| 101 | Carlos Mendoza | OF | New York Mets, NL | September 3, 1997 | September 30, 2000 |
| 102 | Oscar Henríquez | P | Houston Astros, NL | September 7, 1997 | September 8, 2002 |
| 103 | Giomar Guevara | SS | Seattle Mariners, AL | September 19, 1997 | April 27, 1999 |
| 104 | José Miguel Nieves | IF | Chicago Cubs, NL | August 7, 1998 | July 29, 2002 |
| 105 | Álex González; All-Star | SS | Florida Marlins, NL | August 25, 1998 | April 17, 2014 |
| 106 | Carlos Guillén; 3× All-Star | UTIL | Seattle Mariners, AL | September 6, 1998 | September 18, 2011 |
| 107 | Alex Ramírez | OF | Cleveland Indians, AL | September 19, 1998 | September 27, 2000 |
| 108 | Freddy García; 2× All-Star | P | Seattle Mariners, AL | April 7, 1999 | September 24, 2013 |
| 109 | Beiker Graterol | P | Detroit Tigers, AL | April 9, 1999 | April 9, 1999 |
| 110 | Horacio Estrada | P | Milwaukee Brewers, NL | May 4, 1999 | July 21, 2001 |
| 111 | Orber Moreno | P | Kansas City Royals, AL | May 25, 1999 | July 22, 2004 |
| 112 | Carlos Hernández | 2B | Houston Astros, NL | May 26, 1999 | October 1, 2000 |
| 113 | Melvin Mora; 2× All-Star | 3B | Baltimore Orioles, AL | May 30, 1999 | June 29, 2011 |
| 114 | Liu Rodríguez | 2B | Chicago White Sox, AL | June 9, 1999 | October 3, 1999 |
| 115 | Ramón Hernández; All-Star | C | Cincinnati Reds, NL | June 29, 1999 | June 12, 2013 |
| 116 | Wiki González | C | San Diego Padres, NL | August 14, 1999 | May 24, 2006 |
| 117 | Tony Armas Jr. | P | Montreal Expos, NL | August 16, 1999 | July 7, 2008 |
| 118 | Johan Santana; 2× AL Cy Young, 4× All-Star, Gold Glove | P | Minnesota Twins, AL | April 3, 2000 | August 17, 2012 |
| 119 | Rubén Quevedo | P | Chicago Cubs, NL | April 14, 2000 | September 28, 2003 |
| 120 | Fernando Lunar | C | Atlanta Braves, NL | May 8, 2000 | April 11, 2002 |
| 121 | Darwin Cubillán | P | Toronto Blue Jays, AL | May 20, 2000 | June 1, 2004 |
| 122 | William Martínez | P | Cleveland Indians, AL | June 14, 2000 | June 14, 2000 |
| 123 | Alex Cabrera | 1B | Arizona Diamondbacks, NL | June 26, 2000 | September 30, 2000 |
| 124 | Luis Rivas | IF | Minnesota Twins, AL | September 16, 2000 | September 20, 2008 |
| 125 | Clemente Álvarez | C | Philadelphia Phillies, NL | September 19, 2000 | October 1, 2000 |
| 126 | Donaldo Méndez | IF | San Diego Padres, NL | April 5, 2001 | July 6, 2003 |
| 127 | Jorge Julio | P | Baltimore Orioles, AL | April 26, 2001 | June 1, 2009 |
| 128 | Alex Escobar | OF | New York Mets, NL | May 8, 2001 | August 25, 2006 |
| 129 | Juan Moreno | P | Texas Rangers, AL | May 17, 2001 | April 16, 2002 |
| 130 | Endy Chávez | OF | Kansas City Royals, AL | May 29, 2001 | September 27, 2014 |
| 131 | Juan Rincón | P | Minnesota Twins, AL | June 7, 2001 | June 20, 2010 |
| 132 | Víctor Zambrano | P | Tampa Bay Devil Rays, AL | June 21, 2001 | September 30, 2007 |
| 133 | César Izturis; Gold Glove, All-Star | SS | Toronto Blue Jays, AL | June 23, 2001 | September 29, 2013 |
| 134 | Carlos E. Hernández | P | Houston Astros, NL | August 8, 2001 | September 26, 2004 |
| 135 | Carlos Zambrano; 3× All-Star | P | Chicago Cubs, NL | August 20, 2001 | September 21, 2012 |
| 136 | Juan Rivera | OF | New York Yankees, AL | September 4, 2001 | October 3, 2012 |
| 137 | Yorvit Torrealba | C | San Francisco Giants, NL | September 5, 2001 | September 25, 2013 |
| 138 | Wilfredo Rodríguez | P | Houston Astros, NL | September 21, 2001 | October 4, 2001 |
| 139 | Steve Torrealba | C | Atlanta Braves, NL | October 6, 2001 | September 29, 2002 |
| 140 | Carlos Silva | P | Minnesota Twins, AL | April 1, 2002 | September 7, 2010 |
| 141 | Luis Ugueto | SS | Seattle Mariners, AL | April 3, 2002 | September 23, 2003 |
| 142 | Félix Escalona | IF | Tampa Bay Devil Rays, AL | April 4, 2002 | October 2, 2005 |
| 143 | Oscar Salazar | IF | Detroit Tigers, AL | April 10, 2002 | October 2, 2010 |
| 144 | Marco Scutaro; All-Star | SS | Boston Red Sox, AL | July 21, 2002 | July 24, 2014 |
| 145 | Antonio Álvarez | OF | Pittsburgh Pirates, NL | September 4, 2002 | October 3, 2004 |
| 146 | Omar Infante; All-Star | UTIL | Detroit Tigers, AL | September 7, 2002 | June 6, 2016 |
| 147 | Víctor Martínez; 5× All-Star | C | Cleveland Indians, AL | September 10, 2002 | September 18, 2018 |
| 148 | Alex Herrera | P | Cleveland Indians, AL | September 13, 2002 | July 20, 2003 |
| 149 | Francisco Rodríguez; 6× All-Star | P | Anaheim Angels, AL | September 18, 2002 | June 22, 2017 |
| 150 | Wilfredo Ledezma | P | Detroit Tigers, AL | April 2, 2003 | August 28, 2011 |
| 151 | Rosman García | P | Texas Rangers, AL | April 19, 2003 | August 8, 2004 |
| 152 | Carlos Méndez | C | Baltimore Orioles, AL | May 22, 2003 | September 28, 2003 |
| 153 | Ray Olmedo | SS | Cincinnati Reds, NL | May 25, 2003 | October 3, 2012 |
| 154 | Miguel Cabrera; 2× AL MVP, 11× All-Star, Triple Crown | 3B | Florida Marlins, NL | June 20, 2003 | October 1, 2023 |
| 155 | Carlos Valderrama | OF | San Francisco Giants, NL | June 21, 2003 | June 29, 2003 |
| 156 | Rafael Betancourt | P | Cleveland Indians, AL | July 13, 2003 | August 22, 2015 |
| 157 | René Reyes | OF | Colorado Rockies, NL | July 22, 2003 | June 2, 2004 |
| 158 | Alex Prieto | 2B | Minnesota Twins, AL | July 26, 2003 | June 24, 2004 |
| 159 | Humberto Quintero | C | Houston Astros, NL | September 3, 2003 | September 27, 2014 |
| 160 | Anderson Machado | IF | Philadelphia Phillies, NL | September 27, 2003 | July 28, 2005 |
| 161 | Luis A. González | 2B | Colorado Rockies, NL | April 6, 2004 | August 29, 2006 |
| 162 | José Castillo | IF | Pittsburgh Pirates, NL | April 7, 2004 | September 28, 2008 |
| 163 | Andrés Blanco | SS | Kansas City Royals, AL | April 18, 2004 | September 12, 2017 |
| 164 | Eduardo Villacis | P | Kansas City Royals, AL | May 1, 2004 | May 1, 2004 |
| 165 | Ramón A. Castro | SS | Oakland Athletics, AL | June 21, 2004 | July 26, 2004 |
| 166 | José López; All-Star | 2B | Seattle Mariners, AL | July 31, 2004 | October 3, 2012 |
| 167 | Maicer Izturis | IF | Montreal Expos, NL | August 27, 2004 | April 13, 2014 |
| 168 | Guillermo Quiróz | C | Texas Rangers, AL | September 4, 2004 | September 13, 2014 |
| 169 | Dioner Navarro; All-Star | C | New York Yankees, AL | September 7, 2004 | September 30, 2016 |
| 170 | Lino Urdaneta | P | New York Mets, NL | September 9, 2004 | May 7, 2007 |
| 171 | Gustavo Chacín | P | Toronto Blue Jays, AL | September 20, 2004 | September 30, 2010 |
| 172 | Marcos Carvajal | P | Colorado Rockies, NL | April 6, 2005 | September 29, 2007 |
| 173 | Ronny Cedeño | 2B | Chicago Cubs, NL | April 23, 2005 | June 28, 2014 |
| 174 | William Bergolla | IF | Cincinnati Reds, NL | May 9, 2005 | June 25, 2005 |
| 175 | Luis Rodríguez | SS | Minnesota Twins, AL | May 21, 2005 | September 27, 2011 |
| 176 | Yorman Bazardo | P | Detroit Tigers, NL | May 26, 2005 | October 3, 2009 |
| 177 | Danny Sandoval | SS | Philadelphia Phillies, NL | July 17, 2005 | October 1, 2006 |
| 178 | Félix Hernández; AL Cy Young, 6× All-Star | P | Seattle Mariners, AL | August 4, 2005 | September 26, 2019 |
| 179 | Alejandro Freire | 1B | Baltimore Orioles, AL | August 9, 2005 | October 1, 2005 |
| 180 | Franklin Gutiérrez; Gold Glove | OF | Cleveland Indians, AL | August 31, 2005 | June 24, 2017 |
| 181 | Alejandro Machado | IF | Minnesota Twins, AL | September 2, 2005 | October 2, 2005 |
| 182 | Miguel Pérez | C | Cincinnati Reds, NL | September 7, 2005 | September 28, 2005 |
| 183 | Josh Barfield | P | San Diego Padres, NL | April 3, 2006 | June 25, 2009 |
| 184 | Fernando Nieve | P | Houston Astros, NL | April 4, 2006 | July 21, 2010 |
| 185 | Martín Prado; All-Star | 2B | Atlanta Braves, NL | April 23, 2006 | September 29, 2019 |
| 186 | Ángel Guzmán | P | Chicago Cubs, NL | April 26, 2006 | September 8, 2009 |
| 187 | Yusmeiro Petit | P | Florida Marlins, NL | May 14, 2006 | October 1, 2021 |
| 188 | Renyel Pinto | P | Florida Marlins, NL | May 18, 2006 | June 16, 2010 |
| 189 | Enrique González | P | Arizona Diamondbacks, NL | May 28, 2006 | June 8, 2011 |
| 190 | Eliézer Alfonzo | C | San Francisco Giants, NL | June 3, 2006 | September 13, 2011 |
| 191 | Edward Mujica; All-Star | P | Cleveland Indians, AL | June 21, 2006 | August 12, 2017 |
| 192 | Aníbal Sánchez | P | Florida Marlins, NL | June 25, 2006 | October 1, 2022 |
| 193 | Melvin Dorta | UTIL | Washington Nationals, NL | July 21, 2006 | October 1, 2006 |
| 194 | Alberto Callaspo | UTIL | Arizona Diamondbacks, NL | August 6, 2006 | August 19, 2015 |
| 195 | Miguel Montero; 2× All-Star | C | Arizona Diamondbacks, NL | September 6, 2006 | April 5, 2018 |
| 196 | Carlos Maldonado | C | Pittsburgh Pirates, NL | September 8, 2006 | May 29, 2012 |
| 197 | Oswaldo Navarro | IF | Seattle Mariners, AL | September 9, 2006 | July 18, 2010 |
| 198 | César Jiménez | P | Seattle Mariners, AL | September 11, 2006 | October 1, 2015 |
| 199 | Alvin Colina | C | Colorado Rockies, NL | September 18, 2006 | September 24, 2006 |
| 200 | Héctor Giménez | C | Houston Astros, NL | September 25, 2006 | June 29, 2013 |
| 201 | Gustavo Molina | C | Chicago White Sox, AL | April 2, 2007 | April 28, 2011 |
| 202 | Jesús Flores | C | Washington Nationals, NL | April 4, 2007 | October 3, 2012 |
| 203 | Yoel Hernández | P | Philadelphia Phillies, NL | May 5, 2007 | August 19, 2007 |
| 204 | Guillermo Rodríguez | C | San Francisco Giants, NL | June 13, 2007 | October 3, 2009 |
| 205 | Luis Hernández | SS | Baltimore Orioles, AL | July 8, 2007 | August 26, 2012 |
| 206 | José Ascanio | P | Atlanta Braves, NL | July 13, 2007 | June 5, 2011 |
| 207 | Mauro Zárate | P | Florida Marlins, NL | August 7, 2007 | September 29, 2007 |
| 208 | Edwin Bellorín | C | Colorado Rockies, NL | August 7, 2007 | June 6, 2009 |
| 209 | Asdrúbal Cabrera; 2× All-Star | 2B | Cleveland Indians, AL | August 8, 2007 | September 28, 2021 |
| 210 | Franklin Morales | P | Colorado Rockies, NL | August 18, 2007 | July 31, 2016 |
| 211 | Juan Gutiérrez | P | Houston Astros, NL | August 19, 2007 | September 26, 2014 |
| 212 | Rómulo Sánchez | P | Pittsburgh Pirates, NL | August 27, 2007 | September 25, 2010 |
| 213 | Alberto González | IF | New York Yankees, AL | September 1, 2007 | July 19, 2013 |
| 214 | Harvey García | P | Florida Marlins, NL | September 3, 2007 | September 29, 2007 |
| 215 | Armando Galarraga | P | Texas Rangers, AL | September 15, 2007 | August 19, 2012 |
| 216 | Gregor Blanco | OF | Atlanta Braves, NL | March 30, 2008 | September 30, 2018 |
| 217 | Alex Romero | OF | Arizona Diamondbacks, NL | April 2, 2008 | October 3, 2009 |
| 218 | Hernán Iribarren | 2B | Milwaukee Brewers, NL | April 12, 2008 | October 2, 2016 |
| 219 | Alex Serrano | P | Los Angeles Angels, AL | April 16, 2008 | April 16, 2008 |
| 220 | Eider Torres | 2B | Baltimore Orioles, AL | April 26, 2008 | May 7, 2008 |
| 221 | Jonathan Herrera | 2B | Colorado Rockies, NL | April 30, 2008 | September 9, 2015 |
| 222 | Luis Maza | IF | Los Angeles Dodgers, NL | May 14, 2008 | July 18, 2008 |
| 223 | Gregorio Petit | 2B | Oakland Athletics, AL | May 18, 2008 | September 29, 2018 |
| 224 | Carlos González; 3× Gold Glove, 3× All-Star | OF | Colorado Rockies, NL | May 30, 2008 | June 27, 2019 |
| 225 | Max Ramírez | C | Texas Rangers, AL | June 22, 2008 | June 30, 2010 |
| 226 | Iván Ochoa | SS | San Francisco Giants, NL | July 12, 2008 | September 28, 2008 |
| 227 | Pablo Sandoval; 2× All-Star | 3B/C/1B | San Francisco Giants, NL | August 14, 2008 | July 29, 2021 |
| 228 | Ramón Ramírez | P | Cincinnati Reds, NL | August 30, 2008 | October 4, 2009 |
| 229 | Luis Valbuena | 2B | Seattle Mariners, AL | September 2, 2008 | August 3, 2018 |
| 230 | Alcides Escobar; Gold Glove, All-Star | SS | Milwaukee Brewers, NL | September 3, 2008 | Active |
| 231 | José Mijares | P | Minnesota Twins, AL | September 13, 2008 | September 28, 2013 |
| 232 | Jesús Delgado | P | Florida Marlins, NL | September 17, 2008 | September 23, 2008 |
| 233 | Francisco Cervelli | C | New York Yankees, AL | September 18, 2008 | August 22, 2020 |
| 234 | Elvis Andrus; 2× All-Star | SS | Texas Rangers, AL | April 6, 2009 | October 1, 2023 |
| 235 | Edwin Moreno | P | San Diego Padres, NL | April 7, 2009 | June 14, 2009 |
| 236 | Ronald Belisario | P | Los Angeles Dodgers, NL | April 7, 2009 | June 30, 2015 |
| 237 | Anthony Ortega | P | Los Angeles Angels, AL | April 25, 2009 | May 6, 2009 |
| 238 | Gerardo Parra; 2× Gold Glove | OF | Arizona Diamondbacks, NL | May 13, 2009 | October 3, 2021 |
| 239 | Sergio Escalona | P | Philadelphia Phillies, NL | May 17, 2009 | September 7, 2011 |
| 240 | Jesús Guzmán | 1B | San Francisco Giants, NL | May 21, 2009 | September 24, 2014 |
| 241 | Guillermo Moscoso | P | Texas Rangers, AL | May 30, 2009 | September 29, 2013 |
| 242 | José Lobatón | C | San Diego Padres, NL | July 5, 2009 | June 29, 2021 |
| 243 | Jhoulys Chacín | P | Colorado Rockies, NL | July 25, 2009 | Active |
| 244 | Carlos Carrasco | P | Cleveland Indians, AL | September 1, 2009 | Active |
| 245 | Víctor Gárate | P | Washington Nationals, NL | September 5, 2009 | September 22, 2009 |
| 246 | Niuman Romero | SS | Cleveland Indians, AL | September 8, 2009 | July 6, 2010 |
| 247 | Henry Rodríguez | P | Oakland Athletics, AL | September 21, 2009 | May 12, 2014 |
| 248 | Carlos Monasterios | P | Los Angeles Dodgers, NL | April 5, 2010 | September 29, 2010 |
| 249 | Argenis Díaz | SS | Pittsburgh Pirates, NL | April 21, 2010 | September 30, 2010 |
| 250 | Wilson Ramos; All-Star | C | Minnesota Twins, AL | May 2, 2010 | August 29, 2021 |
| 251 | Frank Mata | P | Baltimore Orioles, AL | May 26, 2010 | July 18, 2010 |
| 252 | José Tábata | OF | Pittsburgh Pirates, NL | June 9, 2010 | June 25, 2015 |
| 253 | Félix Doubront | P | Boston Red Sox, AL | June 18, 2010 | October 3, 2015 |
| 254 | Jeanmar Gómez | P | Cleveland Indians, AL | July 18, 2010 | May 19, 2019 |
| 255 | Gregory Infante | P | Chicago White Sox, AL | September 7, 2010 | April 27, 2018 |
| 256 | Edgmer Escalona | P | Colorado Rockies, NL | September 10, 2010 | August 18, 2013 |
| 257 | J. C. Boscán | C | Atlanta Braves, NL | October 1, 2010 | September 29, 2013 |
| 258 | Brayan Villarreal | P | Detroit Tigers, AL | April 2, 2011 | August 20, 2013 |
| 259 | Eduardo Sánchez | P | St. Louis Cardinals, NL | April 13, 2011 | August 13, 2013 |
| 260 | Alexi Amarista | 2B | Los Angeles Angels, AL | April 26, 2011 | October 1, 2017 |
| 261 | Ezequiel Carrera | OF | Cleveland Indians, AL | May 20, 2011 | October 1, 2017 |
| 262 | Lester Oliveros | P | Detroit Tigers, AL | July 1, 2011 | September 28, 2014 |
| 263 | Héctor Sánchez | C | San Francisco Giants, NL | July 15, 2011 | October 1, 2017 |
| 264 | Robinson Chirinos | C | Tampa Bay Rays, AL | July 18, 2011 | October 5, 2022 |
| 265 | Alexander Torres | P | Tampa Bay Rays, AL | July 18, 2011 | July 29, 2015 |
| 266 | Jose Altuve; AL MVP, Gold Glove, 8× All-Star | 2B | Houston Astros, NL | July 20, 2011 | Active |
| 267 | Manny Piña | C | Kansas City Royals, AL | August 3, 2011 | July 9, 2023 |
| 268 | Henderson Álvarez; All-Star | P | Toronto Blue Jays, AL | August 10, 2011 | September 30, 2017 |
| 269 | Salvador Perez; 5× Gold Glove, 8× All-Star, 2015 World Series MVP | C | Kansas City Royals, AL | August 10, 2011 | Active |
| 270 | Jesús Montero | C | New York Yankees, AL | September 1, 2011 | October 3, 2015 |
| 271 | Eduardo Escobar | 3B | Chicago White Sox, AL | September 2, 2011 | Active |
| 272 | Freddy Galvis | 2B | Philadelphia Phillies, NL | April 5, 2012 | October 3, 2021 |
| 273 | Marwin González | UTIL | Houston Astros, NL | April 6, 2012 | October 5, 2022 |
| 274 | Sandy León | C | Washington Nationals, NL | May 14, 2012 | Active |
| 275 | Gorkys Hernández | OF | Pittsburgh Pirates, NL | May 21, 2012 | Active |
| 276 | José Ortega | P | Detroit Tigers, AL | June 8, 2012 | April 26, 2014 |
| 277 | Hernán Pérez | 2B | Detroit Tigers, AL | June 9, 2012 | Active |
| 278 | Martín Pérez; All-Star | P | Texas Rangers, AL | June 27, 2012 | Active |
| 279 | Luis Avilán | P | Atlanta Braves, NL | July 14, 2012 | April 15, 2021 |
| 280 | Miguel Socolovich | P | Baltimore Orioles, AL | July 14, 2012 | June 2, 2018 |
| 281 | Pedro Hernández | P | Chicago White Sox, AL | July 18, 2012 | July 31, 2014 |
| 282 | Avisaíl García; All-Star | OF | Detroit Tigers, AL | August 31, 2012 | Active |
| 283 | Henry Rodríguez | 2B | Cincinnati Reds, NL | September 2, 2012 | September 29, 2013 |
| 284 | Jean Machi | P | San Francisco Giants, NL | September 3, 2012 | May 12, 2017 |
| 285 | Luis Jimenez | 1B | Seattle Mariners, AL | September 4, 2012 | September 23, 2012 |
| 286 | Wilmer Font | P | Texas Rangers, AL | September 18, 2012 | Active |
| 287 | Rafael Ortega | OF | Colorado Rockies, NL | September 30, 2012 | Active |
| 288 | Joseph Ortiz | P | Texas Rangers, AL | March 31, 2013 | September 20, 2013 |
| 289 | Héctor Rondón | P | Chicago Cubs, NL | April 3, 2013 | September 26, 2020 |
| 290 | Oswaldo Arcia | OF | Minnesota Twins, AL | April 15, 2013 | September 18, 2016 |
| 291 | Yoervis Medina | P | Seattle Mariners, AL | April 16, 2013 | July 26, 2015 |
| 292 | Bruce Rondon | P | Detroit Tigers, AL | April 25, 2013 | July 10, 2018 |
| 293 | Jesus Sucre | C | Seattle Mariners, AL | May 24, 2013 | April 26, 2019 |
| 294 | César Hernández | 2B | Philadelphia Phillies, NL | May 29, 2013 | Active |
| 295 | José Álvarez | P | Detroit Tigers, AL | June 9, 2013 | Active |
| 296 | Wilmer Flores | IF | New York Mets, NL | August 6, 2013 | Active |
| 297 | David Martínez | P | Houston Astros, AL | August 21, 2013 | July 13, 2014 |
| 298 | Josmil Pinto | C | Minnesota Twins, AL | September 1, 2013 | October 2, 2016 |
| 299 | Mauricio Robles | P | Philadelphia Phillies, NL | September 3, 2013 | September 26, 2013 |
| 300 | Ehire Adrianza | 2B | San Francisco Giants, NL | September 8, 2013 | May 8, 2024 |
| 301 | Miguel González | C | Chicago White Sox, AL | September 10, 2013 | September 28, 2013 |
| 302 | Wilfredo Tovar | SS | New York Mets, NL | September 22, 2013 | May 29, 2021 |
| 303 | Yangervis Solarte | 3B | New York Yankees, AL | April 2, 2014 | May 6, 2019 |
| 304 | Luis Sardinas | 2B | Texas Rangers, AL | April 20, 2014 | April 28, 2018 |
| 305 | Ender Inciarte; 3× Gold Glove, All-Star | OF | Arizona Diamondbacks, NL | May 2, 2014 | Active |
| 306 | Rougned Odor | 2B | Texas Rangers, AL | May 8, 2014 | Active |
| 307 | Jesús Aguilar; All-Star | 1B | Cleveland Indians, AL | May 15, 2014 | Active |
| 308 | David Peralta; Gold Glove | OF | Arizona Diamondbacks, NL | June 1, 2014 | Active |
| 309 | Wilking Rodríguez | P | Kansas City Royals, AL | June 3, 2014 | June 6, 2014 |
| 310 | Eugenio Suárez; All-Star | SS | Detroit Tigers, AL | June 4, 2014 | Active |
| 311 | Miguel Rojas | SS | Los Angeles Dodgers, NL | June 6, 2014 | Active |
| 312 | Yohan Pino | P | Minnesota Twins, AL | June 19, 2014 | June 19, 2015 |
| 313 | Jorge Rondon | P | St. Louis Cardinals, NL | June 29, 2014 | June 21, 2016 |
| 314 | Yolmer Sánchez; Gold Glove | 2B | Chicago White Sox, AL | July 13, 2014 | Active |
| 315 | Tomás Telis | C | Texas Rangers, AL | August 25, 2014 | April 27, 2018 |
| 316 | Edwin Escobar | P | Boston Red Sox, AL | August 27, 2014 | September 26, 2016 |
| 317 | Carlos Rivero | 3B | Boston Red Sox], AL | August 29, 2014 | September 27, 2014 |
| 318 | Leonel Campos | P | San Diego Padres, NL | September 3, 2014 | September 20, 2017 |
| 319 | Yorman Rodríguez | OF | Cincinnati Reds, NL | September 4, 2014 | September 28, 2014 |
| 320 | Jairo Díaz | P | Los Angeles Angels, AL | September 8, 2014 | Active |
| 321 | Guilder Rodríguez | 3B | Texas Rangers, AL | September 9, 2014 | September 23, 2014 |
| 322 | José Pirela | 2B | New York Yankees, AL | September 22, 2014 | Active |
| 323 | Odubel Herrera; All-Star | OF | Philadelphia Phillies, NL | April 6, 2015 | Active |
| 324 | Angel Nesbitt | P | Detroit Tigers, AL | April 8, 2015 | June 10, 2015 |
| 325 | Felipe Vázquez; 2× All-Star | P | Washington Nationals, NL | April 17, 2015 | September 12, 2019 |
| 326 | Elvis Araújo | P | Philadelphia Phillies, NL | May 5, 2015 | Active |
| 327 | Carlos Pérez | C | Los Angeles Angels of Anaheim, AL | May 5, 2015 | Active |
| 328 | Williams Pérez | P | Atlanta Braves, NL | May 8, 2015 | Active |
| 329 | Dixon Machado | SS | Detroit Tigers, AL | May 27, 2015 | Active |
| 330 | Eduardo Rodríguez | P | Boston Red Sox, AL | May 28, 2015 | Active |
| 331 | Ramón Flores | OF | New York Yankees, AL | May 30, 2015 | Active |
| 332 | Mayckol Guaipe | P | Seattle Mariners, AL | June 1, 2015 | May 14, 2016 |
| 333 | Edgar Ibarra | P | Los Angeles Angels of Anaheim, AL | June 2, 2015 | June 5, 2015 |
| 334 | Junior Guerra | P | Chicago White Sox, AL | June 12, 2015 | Active |
| 335 | Diego Moreno | P | New York Yankees, AL | June 22, 2015 | May 21, 2017 |
| 336 | Deolis Guerra | P | Pittsburgh Pirates, NL | June 27, 2015 | Active |
| 337 | Oscar Hernández | C | Arizona Diamondbacks, NL | July 12, 2015 | Active |
| 338 | José Peraza | SS/2B | Los Angeles Dodgers, NL | August 10, 2015 | Active |
| 339 | Silvino Bracho | P | Arizona Diamondbacks, NL | August 30, 2015 | Active |
| 340 | Ramón Cabrera | C | Cincinnati Reds, NL | September 5, 2015 | October 2, 2016 |
| 341 | Elías Díaz; All-Star | C | Pittsburgh Pirates, NL | September 12, 2015 | Active |
| 342 | Ronald Torreyes | 2B | Los Angeles Dodgers, NL | September 13, 2015 | Active |
| 343 | William Cuevas | P | Boston Red Sox, AL | April 21, 2016 | Active |
| 344 | Albert Suárez | P | San Francisco Giants, NL | May 8, 2016 | Active |
| 345 | Wilfredo Boscán | P | Pittsburgh Pirates, NL | May 19, 2016 | June 21, 2016 |
| 346 | Willson Contreras; 3× All-Star | C | Chicago Cubs, NL | June 17, 2016 | Active |
| 347 | Edubray Ramos | P | Philadelphia Phillies, NL | June 24, 2016 | Active |
| 348 | Omar Narváez; All-Star | C | Chicago White Sox, AL | July 17, 2016 | Active |
| 349 | José Rondón | SS | San Diego Padres, NL | July 29, 2016 | Active |
| 350 | Orlando Arcia; All-Star | SS | Milwaukee Brewers, NL | August 2, 2016 | Active |
| 351 | Vicente Campos | P | Arizona Diamondbacks, NL | August 27, 2016 | Active |
| 352 | Juan Graterol | C | Los Angeles Angels of Anaheim, AL | September 2, 2016 | Active |
| 353 | Yohander Méndez | P | Texas Rangers, AL | September 5, 2016 | Active |
| 354 | José Martínez | OF | St. Louis Cardinals, NL | September 6, 2016 | Active |
| 355 | Germán Márquez; All-Star | P | Colorado Rockies, NL | September 8, 2016 | Active |
| 356 | Renato Núñez | 3B | Oakland Athletics, AL | September 12, 2016 | Active |
| 357 | Carlos Asuaje | 2B | San Diego Padres, NL | September 21, 2016 | August 26, 2018 |
| 358 | José Torres | P | San Diego Padres, NL | September 22, 2016 | Active |
| 359 | Juniel Querecuto | IF | Tampa Bay Rays, AL | September 22, 2016 | Active |
| 360 | Luis Torrens | C | San Diego Padres, NL | April 3, 2017 | Active |
| 361 | Antonio Senzatela | P | Colorado Rockies, NL | April 6, 2017 | Active |
| 362 | José Osuna | IF | Pittsburgh Pirates, NL | April 18, 2017 | Active |
| 363 | José Alvarado | P | Tampa Bay Rays, AL | May 3, 2017 | Active |
| 364 | Arcenio León | P | Detroit Tigers, AL | May 28, 2017 | June 10, 2017 |
| 365 | Ricardo Pinto | P | Philadelphia Phillies, NL | May 31, 2017 | Active |
| 366 | Ronald Herrera | P | New York Yankees, AL | June 17, 2017 | Active |
| 367 | Eduardo Paredes | P | Los Angeles Angels, AL | June 23, 2017 | August 12, 2018 |
| 368 | Franklin Barreto | SS | Oakland Athletics, AL | June 24, 2017 | Active |
| 36[ | Ildemaro Vargas | IF | Arizona Diamondbacks, NL | June 29, 2017 | Active |
| 370 | Adrián Sánchez | IF | Washington Nationals, NL | June 30, 2017 | September 12, 2021 |
| 371 | José Ruiz | P | San Diego Padres, NL | July 24, 2017 | Active |
| 372 | Ricardo Rodríguez | P | Texas Rangers, NL | August 14, 2017 | Active |
| 373 | Anthony Santander; Silver Slugger, All-Star | OF | Baltimore Orioles, AL | August 18, 2017 | Active |
| 374 | Alejandro Chacín | P | Cincinnati Reds, NL | August 23, 2017 | Active |
| 375 | Andrés Machado | P | Kansas City Royals, AL | September 2, 2017 | Active |
| 376 | Breyvic Valera | 2B | St. Louis Cardinals, NL | September 5, 2017 | Active |
| 377 | Gabriel Moya | P | Minnesota Twins, AL | September 12, 2017 | Active |
| 378 | Carlos Tocci | OF | Texas Rangers, AL | March 31, 2018 | Active |
| 379 | Yonny Chirinos | P | Tampa Bay Rays, AL | April 1, 2018 | Active |
| 380 | Víctor Reyes | OF | Detroit Tigers, AL | April 1, 2018 | Active |
| 381 | Engelb Vielma | 2B | Baltimore Orioles, AL | April 13, 2018 | Active |
| 382 | Gleyber Torres; 3× All-Star | 2B | New York Yankees, AL | April 22, 2018 | Active |
| 383 | Ronald Acuña Jr. NL MVP, 2x Silver Slugger, 5× All-Star, NL ROY | LF | Atlanta Braves, NL | April 25, 2018 | Active |
| 384 | Elieser Hernandez | P | Miami Marlins, NL | May 10, 2018 | Active |
| 385 | Luis Guillorme | IF | New York Mets, NL | May 11, 2018 | Active |
| 386 | Alfredo González | C | Chicago White Sox, AL | May 26, 2018 | Active |
| 387 | José Briceño | C | Los Angeles Angels, AL | May 26, 2018 | Active |
| 388 | José Castillo | P | San Diego Padres, NL | June 2, 2018 | Active |
| 389 | Pablo López; All-Star | P | Miami Marlins, NL | June 30, 2018 | Active |
| 390 | Willians Astudillo | UTIL | Minnesota Twins, AL | June 30, 2018 | Active |
| 391 | Ranger Suárez; All-Star | P | Philadelphia Phillies, NL | July 26, 2018 | Active |
| 392 | Francisco Arcia | C | Los Angeles Angels, AL | July 26, 2018 | Active |
| 393 | Osmer Morales | P | Los Angeles Angels, AL | August 16, 2018 | Active |
| 394 | Harold Castro | IF | Detroit Tigers, AL | September 23, 2018 | Active |
| 395 | Yonathan Daza | OF | Colorado Rockies | April 9, 2019 | Active |
| 396 | Pedro Ávila | P | San Diego Padres, NL | April 11, 2019 | Active |
| 397 | Thairo Estrada | 2B | New York Yankees, AL | April 21, 2019 | Active |
| 398 | Darwinzon Hernández | P | Boston Red Sox, AL | April 23, 2019 | Active |
| 399 | José Quijada | P | Miami Marlins, NL | April 24, 2019 | Active |
| 400 | Luis Rengifo | IF | Los Angeles Angels, AL | April 25, 2019 | Active |
| 401 | Eduardo Jiménez | P | Detroit Tigers, AL | May 7, 2019 | Active |
| 402 | Luis Arráez; 2x Silver Slugger, 3× All-Star | 2B | Minnesota Twins, AL | May 18, 2019 | Active |
| 403 | Jesús Tinoco | P | Colorado Rockies, NL | May 31, 2019 | Active |
| 404 | José Suárez | P | Los Angeles Angels, AL | June 2, 2019 | Active |
| 405 | Humberto Arteaga | IF | Kansas City Royals, AL | June 20, 2019 | July 2, 2021 |
| 406 | Adbert Alzolay | P | Chicago Cubs, NL | June 20, 2019 | Active |
| 407 | José Rodríguez | P | Los Angeles Dodgers, NL | July 27, 2019 | April 11, 2023 |
| 408 | Brusdar Graterol | P | Minnesota Twins, AL | September 1, 2019 | Active |
| 409 | Enderson Franco | P | San Francisco Giants, NL | September 18, 2019 | Active |
| 410 | Andrés Giménez; 3x Gold Glove, All-Star | IF | New York Mets, NL | July 24, 2020 | Active |
| 411 | William Contreras; 2x Silver Slugger, 2x All-Star | C | Atlanta Braves, NL | July 24, 2020 | Active |
| 412 | Edward Olivares | OF | San Diego Padres, NL | July 25, 2020 | Active |
| 413 | Anthony Castro | P | Detroit Tigers, AL | July 27, 2020 | Active |
| 414 | Nivaldo Rodríguez | P | Houston Astros, AL | July 28, 2020 | Active |
| 415 | Carlos Sanabria | P | Houston Astros, AL | August 5, 2020 | Active |
| 416 | Ali Sánchez | C | New York Mets, NL | August 10, 2020 | Active |
| 417 | Keibert Ruiz | C | Los Angeles Dodgers, NL | August 16, 2020 | Active |
| 418 | Ricardo Sánchez | P | St. Louis Cardinals, NL | August 17, 2020 | Active |
| 419 | Luis Alexander Basabe | OF | San Francisco Giants, NL | August 27, 2020 | September 22, 2020 |
| 420 | Miguel Yajure | P | New York Yankees, AL | August 31, 2020 | Active |
| 421 | Carlos Hernández | P | Kansas City Royals, AL | September 1, 2020 | Active |
| 422 | Luis García | P | Houston Astros, AL | September 4, 2020 | Active |
| 423 | Mauricio Llovera | P | Philadelphia Phillies, NL | September 6, 2020 | Active |
| 424 | José Mujica | P | Colorado Rockies, NL | September 8, 2020 | Active |
| 425 | Rafael Marchán | C | Philadelphia Phillies, NL | September 14, 2020 | Active |
| 426 | Edwar Colina | P | Minnesota Twins, AL | September 25, 2020 | Active |
| 427 | Tucupita Marcano | UTIL | San Diego Padres, NL | April 1, 2021 | July 24, 2023 |
| 428 | Luis Oviedo | P | Pittsburgh Pirates, NL | April 3, 2021 | Active |
| 429 | Eduard Bazardo | P | Boston Red Sox, AL | April 14, 2021 | Active |
| 430 | Sebastián Rivero | C | Kansas City Royals, AL | May 8, 2021 | Active |
| 431 | Luís Madero | P | Miami Marlins, NL | May 10, 2021 | September 30, 2021 |
| 432 | José Godoy | C | Seattle Mariners, AL | May 21, 2021 | Active |
| 433 | Yonny Hernández | IF | Texas Rangers, AL | August 10, 2021 | Active |
| 434 | Yohel Pozo | C | Texas Rangers, AL | August 13, 2021 | Active |
| 435 | Kervin Castro | P | San Francisco Giants, NL | September 7, 2021 | Active |
| 436 | Jhonathan Díaz | P | Los Angeles Angels, AL | September 17, 2021 | Active |
| 437 | Erick Castillo | C | Chicago Cubs, NL | September 30, 2021 | Active |
| 438 | Ángel Zerpa | P | Kansas City Royals, AL | September 30, 2021 | Active |
| 439 | Diego Castillo | SS | Pittsburgh Pirates, NL | April 7, 2022 | Active |
| 440 | José Azócar | OF | San Diego Padres, NL | April 7, 2022 | Active |
| 441 | Robert Suárez; 2x All-Star | P | San Diego Padres, NL | April 7, 2022 | Active |
| 442 | José Herrera | C | Arizona Diamondbacks, NL | April 9, 2022 | Active |
| 443 | Simón Muzziotti | OF | Philadelphia Phillies, NL | April 11, 2022 | Active |
| 444 | Gabriel Arias | SS | Cleveland Guardians, AL | April 20, 2022 | Active |
| 445 | René Pinto | C | Tampa Bay Rays, AL | April 26, 2022 | Active |
| 446 | Juan Yepez | OF | St. Louis Cardinals, NL | May 4, 2022 | Active |
| 447 | Francisco Morales | P | Philadelphia Phillies, NL | May 9, 2022 | Active |
| 448 | Anderson Espinoza | P | Chicago Cubs, NL | May 30, 2022 | Active |
| 449 | Jermaine Palacios | SS | Minnesota Twins, AL | May 31, 2022 | Active |
| 450 | Gabriel Moreno; Gold Glove | C | Toronto Blue Jays, AL | June 11, 2022 | Active |
| 451 | Max Castillo | P | Toronto Blue Jays, AL | June 19, 2022 | Active |
| 452 | Lenyn Sosa | IF | Chicago White Sox, AL | June 23, 2022 | Active |
| 453 | Maikel García; Gold Glove, All-Star | SS | Kansas City Royals, AL | July 15, 2022 | Active |
| 454 | Freddy Fermín | C | Kansas City Royals, AL | July 15, 2022 | Active |
| 455 | Oswaldo Cabrera | UTIL | New York Yankees, AL | August 17, 2022 | Active |
| 456 | José Butto | P | New York Mets, NL | August 21, 2022 | Active |
| 457 | Carlos Pérez | C | Chicago White Sox, AL | August 26, 2022 | Active |
| 458 | Oswald Peraza | 3B | New York Yankees, AL | September 2, 2022 | Active |
| 459 | Israel Pineda | C | Washington Nationals, NL | September 11, 2022 | Active |
| 460 | Liván Soto | SS | Los Angeles Angels, AL | September 17, 2022 | Active |
| 461 | Ezequiel Tovar; Gold Glove | SS | Colorado Rockies, NL | September 23, 2022 | Active |
| 462 | Francisco Álvarez | C | New York Mets, NL | September 30, 2022 | Active |
| 463 | Brayan Rocchio | SS | Cleveland Guardians, AL | May 16, 2023 | Active |
| 464 | Eduardo Salazar | P | Cincinnati Reds, NL | May 24, 2023 | Active |
| 465 | Andruw Monasterio | IF | Milwaukee Brewers, NL | May 28, 2023 | Active |
| 466 | Luis Matos | OF | San Francisco Giants, NL | June 14, 2023 | Active |
| 467 | Daniel Palencia | P | Chicago Cubs, NL | July 4, 2023 | Active |
| 468 | Edgar Navarro | P | Chicago White Sox, AL | July 30, 2023 | Active |
| 469 | Osleivis Basabe | IF | Tampa Bay Rays, AL | August 13, 2023 | Active |
| 470 | Everson Pereira | OF | New York Yankees, AL | August 22, 2023 | Active |
| 471 | Wilyer Abreu; 2× Gold Glove | OF | Boston Red Sox, AL | August 24, 2023 | Active |
| 472 | Enmanuel De Jesus | P | Miami Marlins, NL | September 9, 2023 | Active |
| 473 | Yoendrys Gómez | P | New York Yankees, AL | September 29, 2023 | Active |
| 474 | Anthony Molina | P | Colorado Rockies, NL | March 28, 2024 | Active |
| 475 | Jackson Chourio | OF | Milwaukee Brewers, NL | March 29, 2024 | Active |
| 476 | Jorge Barrosa | OF | Arizona Diamondbacks, NL | April 1, 2024 | Active |
| 477 | Pedro Pagés | C | St. Louis Cardinals, NL | April 7, 2024 | Active |
| 478 | Jhonny Pareda | C | Miami Marlins, NL | April 17, 2024 | Active |
| 479 | Leo Rivas | IF | Seattle Mariners, AL | April 28, 2024 | Active |
| 480 | Keider Montero | P | Detroit Tigers, AL | May 29, 2024 | Active |
| 481 | Luis Contreras | P | Houston Astros, AL | June 23, 2024 | Active |
| 482 | Yilber Díaz | P | Arizona Diamondbacks, NL | July 8, 2024 | Active |
| 483 | Carlos Narváez | C | New York Yankees, AL | July 20, 2024 | Active |
| 484 | Andrés Chaparro | 1B | Washington Nationals, NL | August 13, 2024 | Active |
| 485 | Jairo Iriarte | P | Chicago White Sox, AL | September 3, 2024 | Active |
| 486 | Javier Sanoja; Gold Glove | UTIL | Miami Marlins, NL | September 7, 2024 | Active |
| 487 | Luisangel Acuña | UTIL | New York Mets, NL | September 14, 2024 | Active |
| 488 | Edgardo Henriquez | P | Los Angeles Dodgers, NL | September 24, 2024 | Active |
| 489 | Luarbert Árias | P | Miami Marlins, NL | March 31, 2025 | Active |
| 490 | Juan Morillo | P | Arizona Diamondbacks, NL | April 19, 2025 | Active |
| 491 | Jorbit Vivas | IF | New York Yankees, AL | May 2, 2025 | Active |
| 492 | Moisés Ballesteros | C | Chicago Cubs, NL | May 13, 2025 | Active |
| 493 | Bradgley Rodríguez | P | San Diego Padres, NL | May 31, 2025 | Active |
| 494 | Wikelman González | P | Chicago White Sox, AL | June 20, 2025 | Active |
| 495 | Andry Lara | P | Washington Nationals, NL | July 2, 2025 | Active |
| 496 | Kenedy Corona | OF | Houston Astros, AL | July 7, 2025 | Active |
| 497 | Luis Curvelo | P | Texas Rangers, NL | July 31, 2025 | Active |
| 498 | Luinder Avila | P | Kansas City Royals, NL | August 13, 2025 | Active |
| 499 | Maximo Acosta | IF | Miami Marlins, NL | August 18, 2025 | Active |
| 500 | Jhostynxon García | P | Boston Red Sox, AL | August 22, 2025 | Active |
| 501 | Jedixson Páez | P | Chicago White Sox, AL | March 26, 2026 | Active |
| 502 | Jeferson Quero | C | Milwaukee Brewers, NL | March 29, 2026 | Active |
| 503 | José Franco | P | Cincinnati Reds, NL | March 30, 2026 | Active |
| 504 | José Fernández | IF | Arizona Diamondbacks, NL | March 31, 2026 | Active |
| 505 | Yohendrick Piñango | P | Toronto Blue Jays, AL | April 26, 2026 | Active |
| 506 | Jesús Rodríguez | C | San Francisco Giants, NL | May 4, 2026 | Active |
| 507 | Omar Martínez | C | Los Angeles Angels, AL | May 8, 2026 | Active |
| 508 | Gabriel González | OF | Minnesota Twins, AL | May 22, 2026 | Active |
| 509 | Víctor Bericoto | OF | San Francisco Giants, NL | May 22, 2026 | Active |
| 510 | Pedro Ramírez | IF | Chicago Cubs, NL | May 23, 2026 | Active |
| 511 | Eliézer Alfonzo Jr. | C | Los Angeles Dodgers, NL | July 5, 2026 | Active |
| 512 | Eduardo Valencia | C | Detroit Tigers, AL | July 9, 2026 | Active |

== See also ==
- Baseball in Venezuela
- Luis Aparicio Award
- Venezuelan Baseball Hall of Fame and Museum
- Venezuelan Professional Baseball League

== Notes ==
- Al Pedrique served as manager of the Arizona Diamondbacks during the 2004 season
- Ozzie Guillén managed the Chicago White Sox from 2004 to 2011 and managed the Miami Marlins during the 2012 season.
- Carlos Mendoza is currently the manager of the New York Mets, having taken over the role beginning with the 2024 Major League Baseball season.
