= Líderes de Miranda =

- Logo

Information
- League: Venezuelan Major League
- Location: Maracay, Venezuela
- Ballpark: Estadio José Pérez Colmenares
- Established: 2021; 4 years ago
- Colors: Black, red and white
- Manager: Carlos García
- Website: lideresdemirandabbc.com

Current uniforms
Home	Away

Líderes de Miranda Baseball Club C.A., or simply Líderes de Miranda, (English: Miranda Leaders) is a Venezuelan professional baseball club competing in the Venezuelan Major League. Despite representing the state of Miranda, the team is based in Maracay in the state of Aragua, due to the lack of infrastructure in Miranda, and plays its home games at Estadio José Pérez Colmenares.

Established in 2021 as one of the charter members of the Venezuelan Major League, the Líderes have finished as runners-up twice, in 2022 and 2024, losing the finals on both occasions to the Senadores de Caracas.

== History ==
The Líderes were established in 2021 as one of the founding members of the Venezuelan Major League alongside the Senadores de Caracas, Marineros de Carabobo, Lanceros de La Guaira, Samanes de Aragua and Guerreros de Caracas. The team won their first game against the Marineros de Carabobo 9–5 on 6 August 2021; the winning pitcher was Ely Izturriaga. The club failed to qualify for the playoffs in the 2021 season, finishing fifth with a 13–17 record. Carlos García was the team's manager.

In 2022, the team, again led by García, finished fourth with a 20–22 record, qualifying for the playoffs. The Líderes faced the regular-season leaders, the Marineros de Carabobo, in the semifinals and, against all odds, swept them in three games. However, the team lost the finals to the Senadores de Caracas in four games. Infielder Edgardo Fermín was named the season's Most Valuable Player.

In 2024, the Líderes again reached the final series and lost one games to four to the Senadores de Caracas in a rematch of the 2022 finals.

== Roster ==
Líderes de Miranda roster
Players		Coaches
Pitchers: 2 (Colombia) David Acevedo; 15 (Venezuela) Frainger Aranguren; 34 (Venezuela) Manuel Cachutt; 44 (Venezuela) Yeizo Campos; 90 (Venezuela) Sergio Caruci; 27 (Venezuela) Jesús Castillo; 42 (Colombia) Diego Chiquillo; 29 (Dominican Republic) Carlos Contreras; 20 (Venezuela) Edixon Durán; 47 (Venezuela) Bryan Francisconi; 9 (United States) Antonio Frias; 59 (Venezuela) Ramón García; 22 (Venezuela) Rito Lugo; 83 (Venezuela) José Martínez; 31 (Venezuela) Marcelino Ortega; 30 (Venezuela) David Ramos; 72 (Venezuela) Francisco Sánchez; 33 (Venezuela) Luis Torres; 48 (Venezuela) Jesús Zambrano	Catchers: 75 (Venezuela) José Colina; 12 (Venezuela) Luis León; 14 (Venezuela) Gregori Rivero; Infielders: 4 (Venezuela) Pedro Barrios; 18 (Venezuela) Cristian Benavides; 00 (Dominican Republic) Dennicher Carrasco; 32 (Venezuela) Jesús Chirinos; 11 (Dominican Republic) Anderson Feliz; 7 (Venezuela) Wilkerman García; 21 (Venezuela) Harvin Mendoza; 85 (Venezuela) José Peroza; 61 (Venezuela) Anthony Rodríguez; Outfielders: 19 (Venezuela) César Idrogo; 5 (Dominican Republic) Deivi Muñoz; 37 (Venezuela) César Ortega; 16 (Venezuela) Raúl Rivas	Manager: (Venezuela) Carlos García; Coaches: (Venezuela) Larry Curiel (first base); (Venezuela) Juan Jaen (bullpen); (Venezuela) Rolando Martínez (first base); (Venezuela) Carlos Mendoza (hitting); (Venezuela) Víctor Oramas (coach); Roster updated on 6 June 2025
