= Estadio José Pérez Colmenares =

Multi-purpose stadium in Maracay, Venezuela

Coordinates: 10.26047°N 67.611626°W

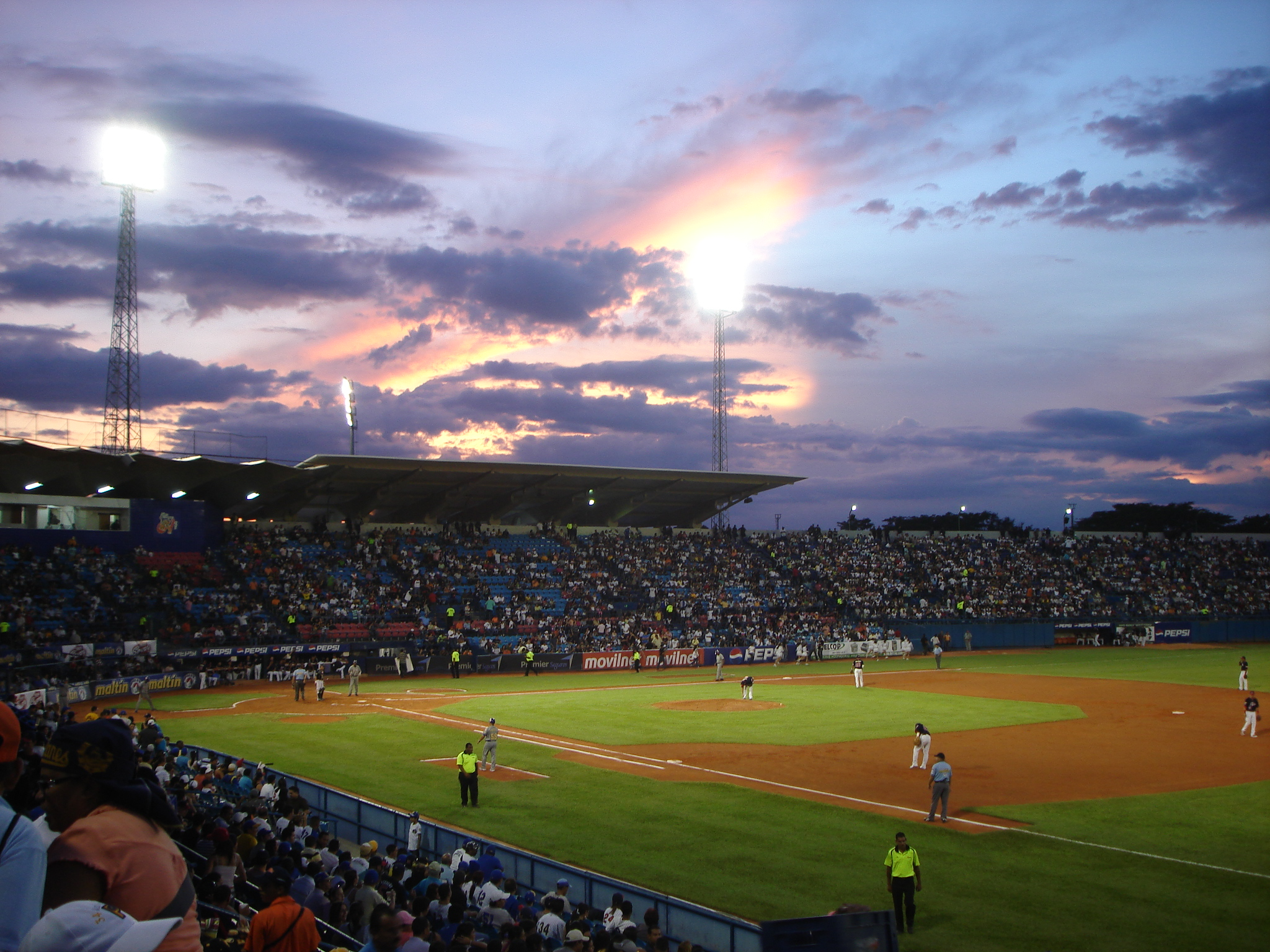
- Interactive map of Estadio José Pérez Colmenares
- Location: Maracay, Venezuela
- Capacity: 12,647

Construction
- Opened: 1965

Tenants
- Tigres de Aragua (1965–present); Samanes de Aragua (2021–present); Líderes de Miranda (2021–present)

Estadio José Pérez Colmenares is a multi-purpose stadium in Maracay, Venezuela. The stadium was named in honor of first baseman and outfielder José Pérez Colmenares, a member of the National Baseball team that won the Baseball World Cup in its 1941 edition.

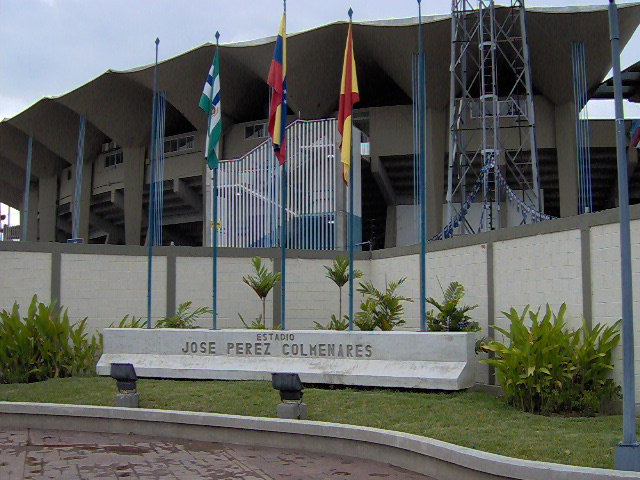
Entrance of Jose Perez Colmenares Baseball Stadium in Maracay

It is used mostly for baseball games and serves as the home of the Tigres de Aragua, a member team of the Venezuelan Professional Baseball League. Located at Campo Elías Street in Maracay, the stadium holds 12,647 people and was opened in 1965.

The Aragua club is regarded as one of the most dominant forces since its inception in the league, winning nine championship titles, five of them between the 2003–04 and 2008–09 seasons. As a result, the attendance of the facility has been increasing yearly making necessary major improvements to the structure of the building and also for the 2006 Caribbean Series that took place between the cities of Maracay and Valencia.

Since 2021, the stadium also hosts the Samanes de Aragua and the Líderes de Miranda of the Venezuelan Major League, Venezuela's summer baseball league.
