= 1999 Caribbean Series =

The forty-first edition of the Caribbean Series (Serie del Caribe) was held from February 2 through February 8 of 1999 with the champion baseball teams of the Dominican Republic, Tigres del Licey; Mexico, Águilas de Mexicali; Puerto Rico, Indios de Mayagüez, and Venezuela, Cardenales de Lara. The format consisted of 12 games, each team facing the other teams twice, and the games were played at Hiram Bithorn Stadium in San Juan, Puerto Rico.

== Summary ==
Semifinales

Venezuela 5 Dominicañ Repubile 3 México 11 Puerto Rico 1

Final México 4 Venezuela 5

== Final standings ==
Country	Club	W	L	W/L %	Managers
Dominican Republic	Tigres del Licey *	5	2	.714	Dave Jauss
Puerto Rico	Indios de Mayagüez	4	3	.571	Al Newman
Venezuela	Cardenales de Lara	2	4	.333	Omar Malavé
Mexico	Águilas de Mexicali	2	4	.333	Francisco Estrada
* Won tie-breaking game for first place

Semifinals Dominican Republic vs Venezuela

          1 2 3 4 5 6 7 8 9        R  C  H

Tigres 0 2 0 3 0 0 0 5 0 5 2 3 Cardenles 0 0 0 0 0 1 0 0 x 1 3 2

Mexico vs. Puerto Pico

           1 2 3 4 5 6 7 8 9 10    R C H

Aguilas 0 1 0 2 0 0 0 0 0 5 5 1 2 Indios 0 1 0 2 0 0 0 0 0 2 2 4 3

Final 

July 23, 1999 7:50 Dominican Republic vs Mexico

        1 2 3 4 5 6 7 8 9

Tigres 0 1 0 2 0 0 0 0 4 Aguilas 0 1 0 2 0 0 2 0 X Tigres win 4:2

== Individual leaders ==
Player	Statistic
Batting
Carlos Mendoza (VEN)	Batting average	.529
Ferdinand Rodríguez (PUR)	Runs	9
Neifi Pérez (DOM)	Hits	12
Wes Chamberlain (VEN); Ferdinand Rodríguez (PUR)	Home runs	3
David Ortiz (DOM)	RBI	9
Four players tied	Stolen bases	2
Pitching
Anthony Chavez (DOM)	Wins	2
José Rosado (PUR)	Strikeouts	13
José Rosado (PUR)	ERA	0.77
José Rosado (PUR)	Innings pitched	11.2
Miguel Alicea (PUR)	Saves	3

== All-Star team ==
Name	Position
Henry Mercedes (DOM)	Catcher
Wes Chamberlain (VEN)	First baseman
Ever Magallanes (MEX)	Second baseman
Edwards Guzmán (PUR)	Third baseman
Neifi Pérez (DOM)	Shortstop
Darryl Brinkley (MEX)	Left fielder
Manny Martínez (DOM)	Center fielder
Karim García (MEX)	Right fielder
Luis Polonia (DOM)	Designated hitter
Miguel Batista (DOM)	Right-handed pitcher
José Rosado (PUR)	Left-handed pitcher
Miguel Alicea (PUR)	Relief pitcher
Awards
Neifi Pérez (DOM)	Most Valuable Player
Dave Jauss (DOM)	Manager

== Sources ==
- Bjarkman, Peter. Diamonds around the Globe: The Encyclopedia of International Baseball. Greenwood. ISBN 978-0-313-32268-6
- Serie del Caribe : History, Records and Statistics (Spanish)
- Resumen de la Serie del Caribe 1999 (Spanish)
- Tigres del Licey : Una mirada histórica a la Serie del Caribe (Spanish)
