= Eddy Díaz =

Venezuelan baseball player (born 1971)

- Second baseman
- Born: September 29, 1971 (age 55); Barquisimeto, Venezuela
- Batted: Right Threw: Right

Professional debut
- MLB: April 17, 1997, for the Milwaukee Brewers
- NPB: April 2, 1999, for the Hiroshima Toyo Carp
- KBO: April 5, 2003, for the SK Wyverns

Last appearance
- MLB: May 21, 1997, for the Milwaukee Brewers
- NPB: August 27, 2002, for the Hiroshima Toyo Carp
- KBO: September 24, 2004, for the Hanwha Eagles

MLB statistics
- Batting average: .220
- Home runs: 0
- Run batted in: 7

NPB statistics
- Batting average: .279
- Home runs: 65
- Run batted in: 220

KBO statistics
- Batting average: .262
- Home runs: 29
- Run batted in: 89
- Stats at Baseball Reference

Teams
- Milwaukee Brewers (1997); Hiroshima Toyo Carp (1999–2002); SK Wyverns (2003); Hanwha Eagles (2004)

Eddy Javier Díaz (born September 29, 1971) is a Venezuelan former professional baseball second baseman.

== Career ==
He played in Major League Baseball (MLB) for the Milwaukee Brewers in 1997. He also played in Nippon Professional Baseball (NPB) for the Hiroshima Toyo Carp, and in the KBO League for the SK Wyverns and Hanwha Eagles.

In a season as a backup with the Brewers, Díaz went 11-for-50 for a .220 batting average with seven RBI, four runs, two doubles and one triple in 16 games.

== See also ==
- List of Major League Baseball players from Venezuela
