= Carlos Maldonado (catcher) =

Venezuelan baseball player (born 1979)

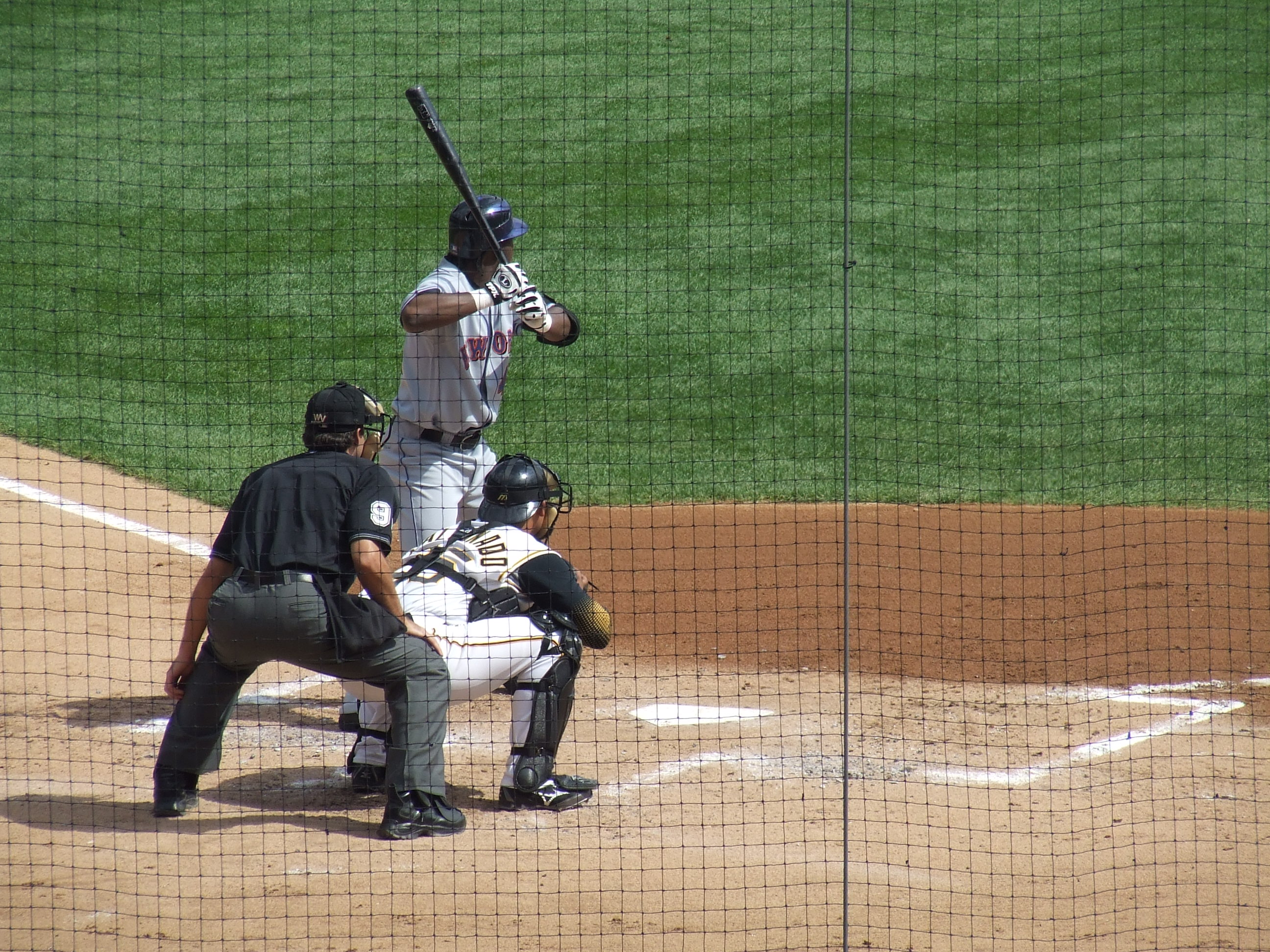
- Carlos Maldonado in 2005
- Catcher
- Born: January 3, 1979 (age 47); Maracaibo, Venezuela
- Batted: Right Threw: Right

MLB debut
- September 8, 2006, for the Pittsburgh Pirates

Last MLB appearance
- May 29, 2012, for the Washington Nationals

MLB statistics
- Batting average: .159
- Home runs: 3
- Runs batted in: 8
- Stats at Baseball Reference

Teams
- Pittsburgh Pirates (2006–2007); Washington Nationals (2010, 2012)

Carlos Luis Maldonado (born January 3, 1979) is a Venezuelan former professional baseball catcher and current coach in the Texas Rangers organization. He played in Major League Baseball (MLB) for the Pittsburgh Pirates and the Washington Nationals.

== Playing career ==
Maldonado originally signed with the Seattle Mariners organization in 1996 as a non-drafted free agent. He was traded to the Houston Astros for infielder Carlos Hernández on March 21, 2000, then spent time in the minor league systems of the Astros, Chicago White Sox, and Pittsburgh Pirates, before making his major league debut with the Pirates in 2006. Maldonado appeared in eight games that year, collecting two hits in nineteen at-bats, for a batting average of .105. He also stole one base. After the end of the season, the Pirates removed him from their 40-man roster, but called him back up in for September 2007, where he hit 2 home runs. He became a free agent at the end of the 2008 season. In January 2009, Maldonado signed a minor league contract with an invite to spring training with the Boston Red Sox. On August 10, 2009, Maldonado was released by the Boston Red Sox. He spent 2010 in the Washington Nationals organization, and appeared in four games for the Major League team. He spent 2011 with Triple-A Syracuse, hitting .234 in 38 games with 1 HR and 12 RBI. He started 2012 with Syracuse, hitting .211 in 21 games with 2 HR and 6 RBI. On May 15, 2012, Maldonado was called up to Washington when backup catcher Sandy León was placed on the 15-day DL. On June 25, he was optioned back to Syracuse. He was 0–9 with 2 BB and 1 RBI in 4 games. On August 3, Maldonado was designated for assignment to create roster space for recently acquired Kurt Suzuki. He elected free agency on Oct. 16, 2012, but re-signed with the Nationals shortly thereafter on a Minor League deal.

Following the 2013 season, Maldonado returned to his native Venezuela to continue playing.

== Coaching career ==
On December 18, 2015, Maldonado was hired as a player-coach for the AA Texas League Frisco RoughRiders, one of the minor league affiliates of the Texas Rangers. Maldonado ended his playing career and became a full-time coach for the Frisco RoughRiders in 2016 and 2017. In 2018, Maldonado spent the first half of the season as a coach for the Down East Wood Ducks and spent the second half of the season as a coach for the Spokane Indians. In 2019, he is the manager of the Dominican Summer League Rangers (2).

In 2026, he was named as the manager of the Hub-City Spartanburgers the High-A affiliate of the Texas Rangers.

== Personal life ==
Maldonado is a graduate of Unidad Educativa Juan Antonio Pérez Bonalde in Maracaibo, Zulia. He has one daughter, Kimberlee, who was born in 2002.

== See also ==
- List of Major League Baseball players from Venezuela
