= Carlos Hernández (infielder) =

Venezuelan baseball player (born 1975)

- Infielder
- Born: December 12, 1975 (age 50); Caracas, Venezuela
- Batted: Right Threw: Right

MLB debut
- May 26, 1999, for the Houston Astros

Last MLB appearance
- April 26, 2000, for the Seattle Mariners

MLB statistics
- Batting average: .133
- Home runs: 0
- Runs batted in: 1
- Stats at Baseball Reference

Teams
- Houston Astros (1999); Seattle Mariners (2000)

Carlos Eduardo Hernández (born December 12, 1975) is a Venezuelan former baseball infielder who played in Major League Baseball (MLB) for the Houston Astros in 1999 and Seattle Mariners in 2000.

== Career ==
Hernández signed with the Astros as an international free agent in July 1992. He spent four years at the team's Venezuelan academy. He led the Midwest League with 58 stolen bases in 1995. He was named the most valuable player of the 1998 Pacific Coast League playoffs as the New Orleans Zephyrs won the Triple-A World Series. He made his MLB debut with the Astros as a pinch runner on May 26, 1999. In three stints with the Astros, he batted 2-for-14 with one run batted in and three steals.

Houston traded Hernández to the Mariners for Carlos Maldonado on March 21, 2000. The Mariners had previously tried to acquire Hernández when they traded Randy Johnson to Houston in 1998. Hernández played in two April games for the Mariners, coming off the bench and batting 0-for-1 and getting caught stealing as a pinch runner. He was released after the season.

Hernández played in Minor League Baseball through 2003. In 2005, he hit .321 and stole 39 bases for the Long Island Ducks and was named to the independent Atlantic League All-Star Game. In 2006, he hit .280 with 32 stolen bases for Long Island. He was named to the Ducks' 10th anniversary team, though he was left off the team's 25th anniversary team.

== See also ==
- List of Major League Baseball players from Venezuela
