= Senadores de Caracas =

Logo	Cap insignia

Information
- League: Venezuelan Major League
- Location: Caracas, Venezuela
- Ballpark: Estadio Universitario
- Established: 2021; 5 years ago
- League championships: 3 (2021, 2022, 2024)
- Colors: Red, dark blue, gold and white
- Manager: Yorvit Torrealba

Current uniforms
Home	Away

The Senadores de Caracas (English: Caracas Senators) are a Venezuelan professional baseball team competing in the Venezuelan Major League. Based in Caracas, the team plays its home games at Estadio Universitario. Established in 2021 as one of the charter members of the Venezuelan Major League, the Senadores have won three league titles in 2021, 2022 and 2024, making them the winningest team in the history of the league.

== History ==
The Senadores were established in 2021 as one of the founding members of the Venezuelan Major League alongside the Marineros de Carabobo, Líderes de Miranda, Lanceros de La Guaira, Samanes de Aragua and Guerreros de Caracas. Led by Víctor Gárate, the team won the inaugural season of the league, defeating the Marineros de Carabobo 4–2 in a six-game championship series; Alberto González, infielder for the Senadores, was named as the finals MVP.

In the following season, the Senadores once again won the league championship, sweeping the Líderes de Miranda in four games. Senadores infielder José Rondón was named the Most Valuable Player of the finals.

In 2024, the Senadores won their third league title by defeating the Líderes de Miranda four games to one in a rematch of the 2022 finals. Rayder Ascanio, infielder for the Senadores, was named Most Valuable Player of the championship series.

From 27 to 29 September 2024, the Senadores participated in an three-game exhibition series against the Nicaragua U–23 baseball team played at Estadio Rigoberto López Pérez in León, Nicaragua. The Senadores won the first two games 5–4 and 7–6, while Nicaragua one the third game 2–0.

In May 2025, Alex Delgado former catcher for the Boston Red Sox, was appointed as manager of the Senadores.

== Roster ==
Senadores de Caracas roster
Players		Coaches
Pitchers: 43 (Dominican Republic) Delvis Alegre; 91 (Venezuela) Luis Amaya; 41 (Venezuela) Wilfredo Boscán; 61 (Venezuela) Will Changarotty; 54 (Dominican Republic) Carlos Contreras; 29 (Venezuela) Greyfer Eregua; 92 (United States) Antonio Frias; 42 (Cuba) Yuniesky García; 57 (Venezuela) Mayckol Guaipe; 19 (Venezuela) Alfonso Hernández; 67 (Venezuela) Arnaldo Hernández; 87 (Venezuela) Robinson Hernández; 33 (Venezuela) Adrián Luna; 71 (Venezuela) Jefferson Medina; 89 (Venezuela) Nelvis Ochoa; 44 (Venezuela) Jorge Rondón; 64 (Venezuela) Julio Vivas	Catchers: 12 (Venezuela) Luis León; 22 (Venezuela) Jason López; 16 (Venezuela) Yojhan Quevedo; 7 (Venezuela) Micael Ramírez; Infielders: 23 (Cuba) Lázaro Alonso; 14 (Venezuela) Luis Arredondo; 15 (Venezuela) Rayder Ascanio; 33 (Venezuela) Alberto Callaspo; 39 (Venezuela) Camilo Gutiérrez; 6 (Venezuela) Kelvin Meleán; 13 (Venezuela) Gabriel Rodríguez; 9 (Venezuela) Henry Rodríguez; 17 (Venezuela) Luis Sardiñas; Outfielders: 53 (Venezuela) Carlos Arroyo; 21 (Venezuela) Manuel Espinoza; 28 (Cuba) Yoelkis Guibert; 2 (Venezuela) Anthony Jiménez; 21 (Venezuela) Luis Rodríguez	Manager: (Venezuela) Alex Delgado; Coaches: (Venezuela) Elvis Aliotti (coach); (Venezuela) Alberto González (first base); (Venezuela) Dámaso González (third base); (Venezuela) Luis Jiménez (hitting); (Venezuela) Francisco Rodríguez (pitching); (Venezuela) Marcos Tábata (coach); Roster updated on 29 April 2026
