= Víctor Gárate =

Venezuelan baseball player (born 1984)

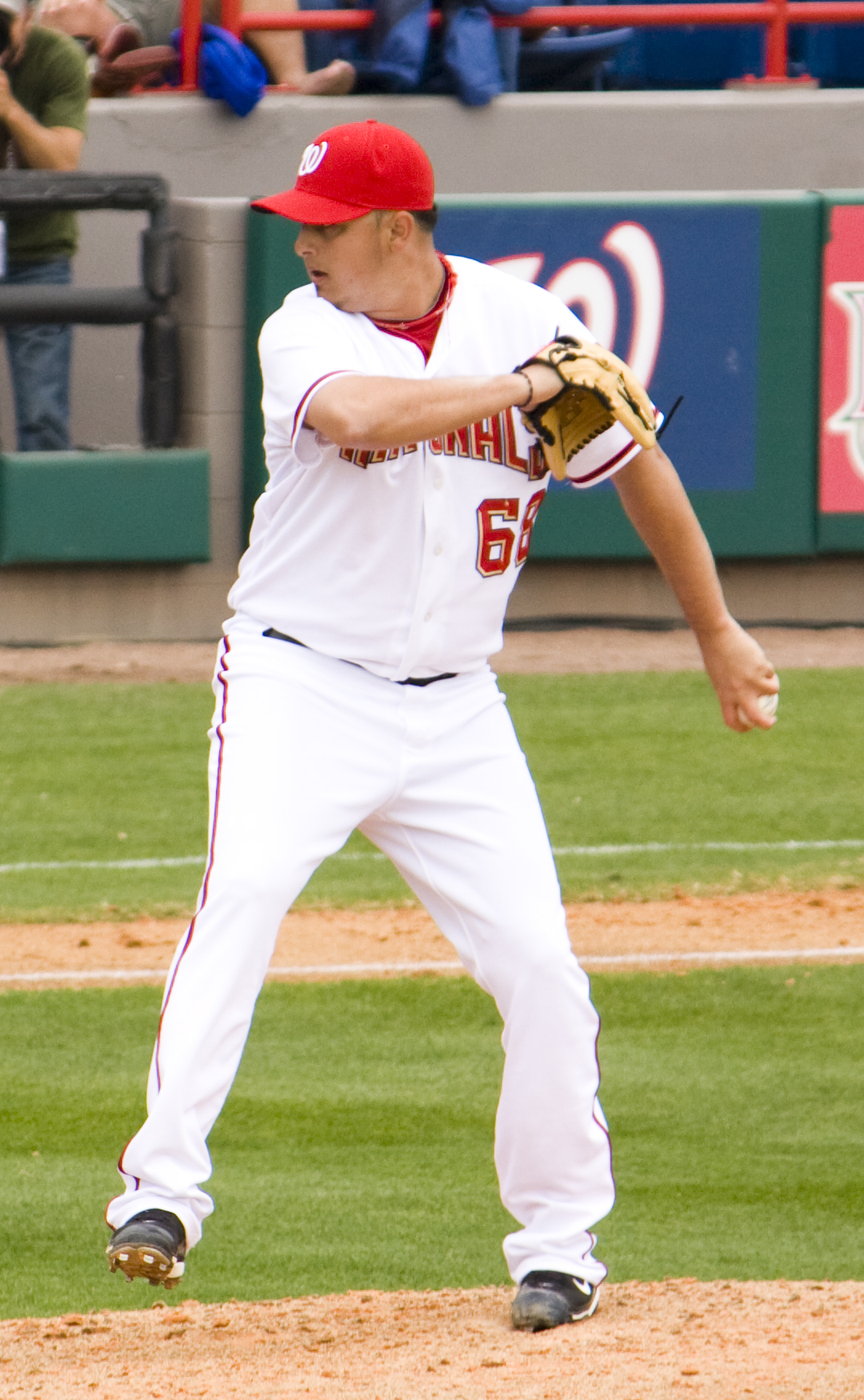
- Gárate with the Washington Nationals
- Pitcher
- Born: September 25, 1984 (age 41); Maracay, Venezuela
- Batted: Left Threw: Left

Professional debut
- MLB: September 5, 2009, for the Washington Nationals
- CPBL: July 20, 2014, for the EDA Rhinos
- NPB: March 29, 2015, for the Hokkaido Nippon-Ham Fighters

Last appearance
- MLB: September 22, 2009, for the Washington Nationals
- NPB: July 28, 2015, for the Hokkaido Nippon-Ham Fighters
- CPBL: October 6, 2015, for the Chinatrust Brothers

MLB statistics
- Win–loss record: 0–0
- Earned run average: 22.50
- Strikeouts: 0

CPBL statistics
- Win–loss record: 11–5
- Earned run average: 3.17
- Strikeouts: 122

NPB statistics
- Win–loss record: 3–1
- Earned run average: 1.71
- Strikeouts: 19
- Stats at Baseball Reference

Teams
- Washington Nationals (2009); EDA Rhinos (2014); Hokkaido Nippon-Ham Fighters (2015); Chinatrust Brothers (2015)

Víctor José Gárate (born September 25, 1984) is a Venezuelan former professional baseball pitcher. He played in Major League Baseball (MLB) for the Washington Nationals, in Nippon Professional Baseball (NPB) for the Hokkaido Nippon-Ham Fighters, and in Chinese Professional Baseball League (CPBL) for the EDA Rhinos.

== Career ==
=== Houston Astros ===
Gárate was signed by the Houston Astros as an amateur free agent in 2005, and made his professional debut with the Greeneville Astros in the Appalachian League. He was 4–1 with a 5.57 ERA during the 19 games he pitched in relief that season. The next two seasons he spent with the Tri-City ValleyCats and the Lexington Legends.

=== Los Angeles Dodgers ===
Gárate was selected by the Los Angeles Dodgers in the minor league phase of the Rule 5 draft in 2007, and played with the Great Lakes Loons and the Inland Empire 66ers of San Bernardino. He was added to the Dodgers' 40-man roster prior to the 2009 season and spent the season with the Double-A Chattanooga Lookouts.

=== Washington Nationals ===
On September 2, 2009, the Dodgers sent Gárate to the Washington Nationals to complete the trade for infielder Ronnie Belliard. Two days later, the Nationals placed him on their active roster and he made his debut on September 5. In four games for Washington during his rookie campaign, Gárate allowed five runs in two innings.

=== Florida Marlins ===
On November 24, 2010, the Florida Marlins signed Gárate to a minor league contract. He made 43 appearances for the Triple-A New Orleans Zephyrs during the 2011 season, posting a 3-3 record and 2.72 ERA with 59 strikeouts and two saves across 56 1/3 innings pitched.

=== Milwaukee Brewers / York Revolution ===
On July 12, 2012, Gárate was released by the Milwaukee Brewers organization. Gárate was signed by the York Revolution of the Atlantic League of Professional Baseball on July 19, but was released a week later on July 26, 2012.

=== Hokkaido Nippon-Ham Fighters ===
On November 19, 2014, Gárate was signed by the Hokkaido Nippon-Ham Fighters of Nippon Professional Baseball.

=== Saraperos de Saltillo ===
Garate signed with the Saraperos de Saltillo of the Mexican League for the 2016 season. He was released on June 8, 2016.

=== San Marino Baseball Club ===
In 2018, Gárate played with San Marino in the Italian Baseball League.

== See also ==
- List of Major League Baseball players from Venezuela
