= Venezuelan Major League =

Summer baseball league in Venezuela

- Sport: Baseball
- Founded: 2021
- No. of teams: 8
- Country: Venezuela
- Most recent champion: Senadores de Caracas (2024)
- Most titles: Senadores de Caracas (3 titles)
- Website: lmbp.net

The Venezuelan Major League, officially the Major League of Professional Baseball (Spanish: Liga Mayor de Béisbol Profesional or LMBP) is a professional baseball league in Venezuela. Unlike the top-level Venezuelan Professional Baseball League, which plays a winter league schedule, the LMBP is played during the summer. It is the first summer baseball league in Venezuela since the Venezuelan Summer League and Bolivarian League ceased operations in 2015 and 2019, respectively.

== History ==
With the support of the Federación Venezolana de Béisbol, the LMBP opened its inaugural season on 6 August 2021. Six teams, based in three stadiums, would play 30 games in August and September, with a best-of-five semifinal series and a best-of-seven final series. The first season was played in a bubble due to the ongoing COVID-19 pandemic.

For the league's second season in 2022, two expansion teams were added: Centauros de La Guaira and Caciques de Distrito.

On June 26, 2026, the league announced that it would cancel the remainder of the 2026 season due to the effects of the 2026 Venezuela earthquakes.

== Current teams ==
Team	City	Stadium	Capacity
Caciques de Distrito	Caracas, Capital District	Estadio Universitario de Caracas	20,723
Centauros de La Guaira	La Guaira, La Guaira	Estadio Fórum La Guaira	14,300
Delfines de La Guaira	La Guaira, La Guaira	Estadio Fórum La Guaira	14,300
Guerreros de Lara	Barquisimeto, Lara	Estadio José Bernardo Pérez	16,000
Líderes de Miranda	Maracay, Aragua	Estadio José Pérez Colmenares	12,650
Marineros de Carabobo	Valencia, Carabobo	Estadio José Bernardo Pérez	16,000
Samanes de Aragua	Maracay, Aragua	Estadio José Pérez Colmenares	12,650
Senadores de Caracas	Caracas, Capital District	Estadio Universitario de Caracas	20,723

=== Former teams ===
- Lanceros de La Guaira (2021)

== Championship history ==
Season	Champion	Runner-up	Manager
2021	Senadores de Caracas	Marineros de Carabobo	(Venezuela) Víctor Gárate
2022	Senadores de Caracas (2)	Líderes de Miranda	(Venezuela) Víctor Gárate
2023	Marineros de Carabobo	Delfines de La Guaira	(Venezuela) Robert Pérez
2024	Senadores de Caracas (3)	Líderes de Miranda	(Venezuela) Víctor Gárate
2025	Samanes de Aragua	Delfines de La Guaira	(Venezuela) José Tábata
2026 season suspended due to the Venezuela earthquakes

== See also ==
- Venezuelan Summer League
