= Baseball at the 2026 Central American and Caribbean Games – Men's team rosters =

The following is a list of rosters for each nation competing in men's baseball at the 2026 Central American and Caribbean Games.

== Key ==
Pos.	Position
P	Pitcher
C	Catcher
IF	Infielder
OF	Outfielder

== Group A ==
=== Cuba ===
Manager: Germán Mesa

Player	No.	Pos.	DOB and age	Team	League	Birthplace
Yuniel Batista	69	P	13 January 2002 (aged 24)	(Cuba) Tigres de Ciego de Ávila	Cuban National Series	Cuba
José Ignacio Bermúdez	98	P	6 October 2003 (aged 22)	(Cuba) Huracanes de Mayabeque	Cuban National Series	(Cuba) Mayabeque Province
Fher Cejas	16	P	9 March 2003 (aged 23)	(Cuba) Industriales	Cuban National Series	Cuba
Randy Cueto	23	P	23 January 2001 (aged 25)	(Cuba) Naranjas de Villa Clara	Cuban National Series	Cuba
Armando Dueñas	6	P	16 October 1992 (aged 33)	(Cuba) Cocodrilos de Matanzas	Cuban National Series	(Cuba) Matanzas Province
Raymond Figueredo	48	P	19 June 1998 (aged 28)	(Cuba) Industriales	Cuban National Series	(Cuba) Havana
Yunieski García	27	P	14 May 1992 (aged 34)	(Cuba) Cazadores de Artemisa	Cuban National Series	Cuba
Frank Herrera	35	P	16 October 1992 (aged 33)	(Cuba) Industriales	Cuban National Series	Cuba
Yankiel Mauris	42	P	2 January 1996 (aged 30)	(Cuba) Gallos de Sancti Spíritus	Cuban National Series	(Cuba) Sancti Spíritus Province
Leonel Moas	20	P	14 April 1996 (aged 30)	(Cuba) Toros de Camagüey	Cuban National Series	(Cuba) Camagüey
Andy Vargas	79	P	21 June 1999 (aged 27)	(Cuba) Industriales	Cuban National Series	Cuba
Andy Cosme	12	C	6 January 1994 (aged 32)	(Italy) BBC Grosseto	Serie A	(Cuba) Artemisa Province
Andrys Pérez	17	C	9 February 2001 (aged 25)	(Cuba) Cocodrilos de Matanzas	Cuban National Series	(Cuba) Matanzas
Jeison Martínez	1	IF	16 October 1999 (aged 26)	Avispas de Santiago de Cuba	Cuban National Series	Cuba
Luis Vicente Mateo	8	IF	19 January 1996 (aged 30)	(Cuba) Elefantes de Cienfuegos	Cuban National Series	(Cuba) Cienfuegos
Henry Quintero	3	IF	23 May 1994 (aged 32)	(Cuba) Leñadores de Las Tunas	Cuban National Series	(Cuba) Camagüey
Yulieski Remón	24	IF	3 July 2002 (aged 24)	(Cuba) Alazanes de Granma	Cuban National Series	Cuba
Tailon Sánchez	18	IF	21 March 1999 (aged 27)	(Cuba) Vegueros de Pinar del Río	Cuban National Series	(Cuba) La Palma
Harold Vázquez	4	IF	30 March 2002 (aged 24)	Avispas de Santiago de Cuba	Cuban National Series	Cuba
Yoel Yanqui	33	IF	25 April 1996 (aged 30)	(Venezuela) Marineros de Carabobo	Venezuelan Major League	(Cuba) Palma Soriano
Yasiel González	50	OF	20 December 1997 (aged 28)	(Cuba) Sabuesos de Holguín	Cuban National Series	(Cuba) Gibara
Yoelkis Guibert	7	OF	29 August 1994 (aged 31)	Avispas de Santiago de Cuba	Cuban National Series	(Cuba) Palma Soriano
Leonel Moas	20	OF	14 April 1996 (aged 30)	(Cuba) Toros de Camagüey	Cuban National Series	(Cuba) Camagüey
José Amaury Noroña	25	OF	11 May 1997 (aged 29)	(Cuba) Cocodrilos de Matanzas	Cuban National Series	(Cuba) Colón

=== Curaçao ===
Manager: Hainley Statia
Coaches: Jonathan Ferreria, Glenciene Gregoria, Scarlet de Groot, Ghionelo Jansen, Gustavo De Jongh, Sorick Liberia, Carlos Pineda

Player	No.	Pos.	DOB and age	Team	League	Birthplace
Nelmerson Angela	25	P	20 February 1998 (aged 28)	(Netherlands) Twins Oosterhout	Honkbal Hoofdklasse	(Curaçao) Willemstad
Dennis Burgersdijk	40	P	19 July 1988 (aged 38)	(Netherlands) Amsterdam Pirates	Honkbal Hoofdklasse	(Netherlands) The Hague
Franklin van Gurp	8	P	25 October 1995 (aged 30)	(Curaçao) Royal Scorpions	Curaçao National Championship AA	(Sint Maarten) Philipsburg
Misja Harcksen	41	P	19 April 1995 (aged 31)	(Netherlands) Twins Oosterhout	Honkbal Hoofdklasse	(Netherlands) Rotterdam
Sedley Karel	32	P	13 July 1990 (aged 36)	(Netherlands) Amsterdam Pirates	Honkbal Hoofdklasse	Netherlands
Finn Kragt	26	P	16 July 2003 (aged 23)	Free agent		Netherlands
Jordan Lucas	19	P	9 September 1990 (aged 35)	(Curaçao) Santa Rosa Indians	Curaçao National Championship AA	Curaçao
Ruderly Manuel	28	P	26 August 1990 (aged 35)	(Curaçao) Wildcats	Curaçao National Championship AA	(Netherlands) Willemstad
Arlison Rodriguez	37	P	5 March 2003 (aged 23)	(Curaçao) Wildcats	Curaçao National Championship AA	(Curaçao) Willemstad
Martijn Schoonderwoerd	17	P	29 November 1997 (aged 28)	(Netherlands) Amsterdam Pirates	Honkbal Hoofdklasse	(Netherlands) Haarlem
Cerilio Soleana	33	P	22 April 1997 (aged 29)	(Curaçao) Royal Scorpions	Curaçao National Championship AA	(Netherlands) Utrecht
Pim Vijfvinkel	29	P	7 January 2001 (aged 25)	(Netherlands) Amsterdam Pirates	Honkbal Hoofdklasse	Netherlands
Phildrick Llewellyn	12	C	25 September 1993 (aged 32)	Free agent		(Curaçao) Willemstad
Stephan Vidal	14	C	4 June 1996 (aged 30)	(Curaçao) Wildcats	Curaçao National Championship AA	(Curaçao) Willemstad
Sherten Apostel	42	IF	11 March 1999 (aged 27)	(Curaçao) Royal Scorpions	Curaçao National Championship AA	(Curaçao) Willemstad
Ray van Gurp	11	IF	2 January 1989 (aged 37)	(Curaçao) Royal Scorpions	Curaçao National Championship AA	(Curaçao) Willemstad
Dudley Leonora	21	IF	15 December 1991 (aged 34)	(Curaçao) Wildcats	Curaçao National Championship AA	Sint Maarten
Stijn van der Meer	23	IF	1 May 1993 (aged 33)	(Netherlands) Neptunus	Honkbal Hoofdklasse	(Netherlands) Rosmalen
Riordan Windster	6	IF	13 November 1997 (aged 28)	(Curaçao) Santa Rosa Indians	Curaçao National Championship AA	Curaçao
Christian Diaz	13	OF	15 June 1989 (aged 37)	(Netherlands) Neptunus	Honkbal Hoofdklasse	Curaçao
Shean Michel	10	OF	26 September 1997 (aged 28)	(Curaçao) Wildcats	Curaçao National Championship AA	(Curaçao) Willemstad
Tommy van den Sanden	9	OF	23 February 1999 (aged 27)	(Netherlands) Amsterdam Pirates	Honkbal Hoofdklasse	Curaçao
Jeandro Tromp	3	OF	8 August 2000 (aged 25)	(Netherlands) Amsterdam Pirates	Honkbal Hoofdklasse	Curaçao

=== Dominican Republic ===
Manager: Félix Fermín Jr.

Player	No.	Pos.	DOB and age	Team	League	Birthplace
Fernando Abad	17	P	17 December 1985 (aged 40)	(Mexico) Conspiradores de Querétaro	Mexican League	(Dominican Republic) La Romana
Carlos Belén	51	P	28 February 1996 (aged 30)	Free agent		(Dominican Republic) Santo Domingo
Miguel Castro	57	P	24 December 1994 (aged 31)	(Mexico) Leones de Yucatán	Mexican League	(Dominican Republic) La Romana
Óscar de la Cruz	56	P	4 March 1995 (aged 31)	(Mexico) Rieleros de Aguascalientes	Mexican League	(Dominican Republic) La Romana
Jean Henríquez	52	P	23 July 1993 (aged 33)	(Mexico) Bravos de León	Mexican League	(Dominican Republic) San Francisco de Macorís
Jhan Mariñez	40	P	12 August 1988 (aged 37)	(Mexico) El Águila de Veracruz	Mexican League	(Dominican Republic) Santo Domingo
Cristopher Molina	20	P	10 June 1997 (aged 29)	(Mexico) El Águila de Veracruz	Mexican League	(Dominican Republic) Moca
Luis Peña	30	P	31 January 1998 (aged 28)	(Venezuela) Caciques de Distrito	Venezuelan Major League	Dominican Republic
Enny Romero	16	P	24 January 1991 (aged 35)	(Mexico) Toros de Tijuana	Mexican League	(Dominican Republic) Santo Domingo
Esmil Rogers	23	P	14 August 1985 (aged 40)	(Mexico) Leones de Yucatán	Mexican League	(Dominican Republic) San Pedro de Macorís
César Valdez	41	P	17 March 1985 (aged 41)	(Mexico) Dorados de Chihuahua	Mexican League	(Dominican Republic) Santo Domingo
Julio Rodríguez	19	C	11 June 1997 (aged 29)	Free agent		(Dominican Republic) Santiago de los Caballeros
Pedro Severino	4	C	15 July 1996 (aged 30)	(Mexico) Sultanes de Monterrey	Mexican League	(Dominican Republic) Bonao
Michael de León	31	IF	14 January 1997 (aged 29)	Free agent		(Dominican Republic) Santo Domingo
Omar Meregildo	18	IF	18 August 1997 (aged 28)	Free agent		(Dominican Republic) Santo Domingo
Deivi Muñoz	39	IF	30 November 1999 (aged 26)	(Venezuela) Marineros de Carabobo	Venezuelan Major League	(Dominican Republic) San Cristóbal
Yairo Muñoz	13	IF	23 January 1995 (aged 31)	Free agent		(Dominican Republic) Nagua
Jimmy Paredes	38	IF	25 November 1988 (aged 37)	Free agent		(Dominican Republic) Bajos de Haina
Alfredo Reyes	44	IF	4 October 1993 (aged 32)	Free agent		(Dominican Republic) Sabana Grande de Palenque
Gilberto Celestino	24	OF	13 February 1999 (aged 27)	Free agent		(Dominican Republic) Santo Domingo
Ricardo Céspedes	3	OF	24 August 1997 (aged 28)	(Venezuela) Guerreros de Lara	Venezuelan Major League	(United States) New York City
Juan Guerrero	14	OF	10 September 2001 (aged 24)	Free agent		(Dominican Republic) San Pedro de Macorís
Diego Hernández	2	OF	21 November 2000 (aged 25)	Free agent		(Dominican Republic) Santo Domingo
Raimel Tapia	15	OF	4 February 1994 (aged 32)	Free agent		(Dominican Republic) San Pedro de Macorís

=== Puerto Rico ===
Manager: Juan González

Player	No.	Pos.	DOB and age	Team	League	Birthplace
Miguel Ausúa	18	P	15 July 1996 (aged 30)	Free agent		Puerto Rico
Jorge Benítez	0	P	6 February 1999 (aged 27)	Free agent		(Puerto Rico) San Juan
Anthony Borrero	53	P	29 January 2000 (aged 26)	(Puerto Rico) Patrulleros de San Sebastián	Liga de Béisbol Superior AA	Puerto Rico
Luis Cintrón	11	P	11 November 1989 (aged 36)	(Puerto Rico) Mulos de Juncos	Liga de Béisbol Superior AA	(Puerto Rico) Las Piedras
Luis Cruz	55	P	10 September 1990 (aged 35)	(Puerto Rico) Pescadores del Plata de Comerío	Liga de Béisbol Superior AA	(Puerto Rico) San Juan
Sidney Duprey	41	P	15 November 1996 (aged 29)	(Puerto Rico) Leones de Patillas	Liga de Béisbol Superior AA	(Puerto Rico) Guayama
Héctor Hernández	50	P	20 February 1991 (aged 35)	(Puerto Rico) Pescadores del Plata de Comerío	Liga de Béisbol Superior AA	(Puerto Rico) Río Piedras
Jorhan Laboy	12	P	13 May 2003 (aged 23)	(United States) Alabama State Hornets	Southwestern Athletic Conference	(Puerto Rico) Humacao
Miguel Mejía	47	P	19 January 1988 (aged 38)	(Puerto Rico) Piratas de Cabo Rojo	Liga de Béisbol Superior AA	(United States) Brooklyn
Noel Pinto	57	P	26 December 1995 (aged 30)	(Puerto Rico) Azucareros de Yabucoa	Liga de Béisbol Superior AA	Puerto Rico
Rubén Ramírez	26	P	14 November 1998 (aged 27)	Free agent		(Puerto Rico) Juncos
Joshua Torres	45	P	26 April 1994 (aged 32)	(Puerto Rico) Patrulleros de San Sebastián	Liga de Béisbol Superior AA	(Puerto Rico) Mayagüez
Kerby Camacho	77	C	24 November 1997 (aged 28)	(Puerto Rico) Arenosos de Camuy	Liga de Béisbol Superior AA	(Puerto Rico) Arecibo
Rubén Castro	4	C	10 July 1996 (aged 30)	(Puerto Rico) Azucareros de Yabucoa	Liga de Béisbol Superior AA	(Puerto Rico) Humacao
Roberto Peña	31	C	8 June 1992 (aged 34)	Free agent		(Puerto Rico) Caguas
Kevin Luciano	71	IF	15 July 1993 (aged 33)	(Puerto Rico) Toritos de Cayey	Liga de Béisbol Superior AA	Puerto Rico
José Rivera	99	IF	7 September 1999 (aged 26)	(Puerto Rico) Pescadores del Plata de Comerío	Liga de Béisbol Superior AA	(Puerto Rico) Bayamón
Yadiel Rivera	29	IF	2 May 1992 (aged 34)	(Puerto Rico) Jueyeros de Maunabo	Liga de Béisbol Superior AA	(Puerto Rico) Caguas
Kevin Santa	3	IF	8 March 1995 (aged 31)	(Puerto Rico) Azucareros de Yabucoa	Liga de Béisbol Superior AA	(Puerto Rico) Yabucoa
Alexis Torres	2	IF	12 December 1997 (aged 28)	(Puerto Rico) Gigantes de Carolina	Liga de Béisbol Superior AA	Puerto Rico
Anthony García	44	OF	4 January 1992 (aged 34)	(United States) Long Island Ducks	Atlantic League	(Puerto Rico) Carolina
Jan Hernández	8	OF	3 January 1995 (aged 31)	Free agent		(Puerto Rico) San Lorenzo
Edison Mora	14	OF	13 August 2000 (aged 25)	Free agent		(Puerto Rico) Villalba
Jadiel Sánchez	20	OF	10 May 2001 (aged 25)	(Puerto Rico) Poetas de Juana Díaz	Liga de Béisbol Superior AA	(Puerto Rico) Arroyo

== Group B ==
=== Colombia ===
Manager: Gio Urshela
Coaches: Ismael Castro, Dayan Díaz, Neder Horta, Sugar Ray Marimón

Player	No.	Pos.	DOB and age	Team	League	Birthplace
Luis Escobar	78	P	30 May 1996 (aged 30)	(Venezuela) Centauros de La Guaira	Venezuelan Major League	(Colombia) Cartagena
Kermin Guardia	65	P	5 December 1996 (aged 29)	Free agent		Colombia
Wilson López	26	P	15 July 2002 (aged 24)	Free agent		(Colombia) Barranquilla
Erling Moreno	49	P	13 November 1997 (aged 28)	Free agent		(Colombia) Cartagena
Jeffry Niño	19	P	26 September 1996 (aged 29)	(Mexico) Marineros de Ensenada	Mexican Northern League	(Colombia) Barranquilla
Juan Polo	65	P	18 May 2001 (aged 25)	(Venezuela) Centauros de La Guaira	Venezuelan Major League	(Colombia) Cartagena
Ronald Ramírez	12	P	17 October 1985 (aged 40)	Free agent		(Colombia) Cartagena
Jhon Romero	73	P	17 January 1995 (aged 31)	(Venezuela) Centauros de La Guaira	Venezuelan Major League	(Colombia) Cartagena
Yoryi Simarra	9	P	18 November 2004 (aged 21)	Free agent		(Colombia) Cartagena
Víctor Vargas	22	P	1 October 1993 (aged 32)	Free agent		(Colombia) Cartagena
Julio Vivas	64	P	3 October 2000 (aged 25)	(Venezuela) Senadores de Caracas	Venezuelan Major League	(Venezuela) Táchira
Ezequiel Zabaleta	38	P	20 August 1995 (aged 30)	(Venezuela) Líderes de Miranda	Venezuelan Major League	(Colombia) Bolívar Department
Ronaldo Hernández	16	C	11 November 1997 (aged 28)	(United States) Long Island Ducks	Atlantic League	(Colombia) Arjona
Guillermo Quintana	20	C	16 March 2001 (aged 25)	Free agent		(Colombia) Cartagena
Andruw Salcedo	55	C	29 September 2002 (aged 23)	Free agent		(Colombia) Sincelejo
Carlos Arroyo	28	IF	11 July 2001 (aged 25)	Free agent		(Colombia) Cartagena
Darío Borrero	53	IF	13 November 2003 (aged 22)	(Canada) Trois-Rivières Aigles	Frontier League	(Venezuela) San Diego
Jordan Díaz	13	IF	13 August 2000 (aged 25)	Free agent		(Colombia) Montería
Jaider Morelos	10	IF	2 January 2000 (aged 26)	Free agent		(Colombia) Cartagena
Fabián Pertuz	11	IF	1 September 2000 (aged 25)	Free agent		(Colombia) Barranquilla
Leandro Emiliani	99	OF	22 March 2000 (aged 26)	Free agent		(Colombia) San Antero
Jesús Marriaga	17	OF	17 December 1998 (aged 27)	(Mexico) Saraperos de Saltillo	Mexican League	(Colombia) Cartagena
Tito Polo	23	OF	23 August 1994 (aged 31)	Free agent		(Colombia) San Andrés Island
Derwin Pomare	0	OF	11 May 1995 (aged 31)	Free agent		(Colombia) San Andrés

=== Mexico ===
Manager: Víctor Bojórquez
Coaches: Fernando Aguado, Rubén Estrada, Santos Hernández, Jorge López, Manuel Pérez, Roque Sánchez, José Luis Sandoval

Player	No.	Pos.	DOB and age	Team	League	Birthplace
Saúl Arías	95	P	16 August 2004 (aged 21)	(Mexico) Guerreros de Oaxaca	Mexican League	(Mexico) Puebla
Hendrick Briones	7	P	1 November 2001 (aged 24)	(Mexico) Rieleros de Aguascalientes	Mexican League	(Mexico) Durango
Ángel López	46	P	16 September 2002 (aged 23)	(Mexico) Bravos de León	Mexican League	(Mexico) Mexicali
Jesús Luna	93	P	6 November 2000 (aged 25)	(Mexico) Sultanes de Monterrey	Mexican League	(Mexico) Torreón
Irving Medina	1	P	12 June 2003 (aged 23)	(Mexico) Caliente de Durango	Mexican League	(Mexico) Durango
Jorge Monroy	84	P	21 March 2002 (aged 24)	(Mexico) Diablos Rojos del México	Mexican League	(Mexico) Guasave
Pedro Reyes	87	P	26 November 2002 (aged 23)	(Mexico) Acereros de Monclova	Mexican League	(Mexico) Coatzacoalcos
André Sánchez	89	P	5 February 2003 (aged 23)	(Mexico) Sultanes de Monterrey	Mexican League	(Mexico) Córdoba
José Manuel Soria	98	P	8 May 2003 (aged 23)	(Mexico) Acereros de Monclova	Mexican League	(Mexico) Monclova
Alejandro Trujillo	25	P	14 December 2001 (aged 24)	(Mexico) El Águila de Veracruz	Mexican League	(Mexico) Veracruz
Alan Valdez	30	P	7 December 2000 (aged 25)	(Mexico) Dorados de Chihuahua	Mexican League	(Mexico) Ciudad Obregón
Daniel Zazueta	70	P	13 October 2000 (aged 25)	(Mexico) Pericos de Puebla	Mexican League	(Mexico) Navojoa
Joseph Sequera	8	C	12 December 2005 (aged 20)	(Mexico) Algodoneros de Unión Laguna	Mexican League	(Mexico) Poza Rica
José Ary Torres	51	C	4 June 2004 (aged 22)	(Mexico) El Águila de Veracruz	Mexican League	(Mexico) Boca del Río
Kevin Armenta	18	IF	14 July 2002 (aged 24)	(Mexico) Saraperos de Saltillo	Mexican League	(Mexico) Guasave
Johan López	10	IF	4 June 2005 (aged 21)	(Mexico) Sultanes de Monterrey	Mexican League	(Mexico) Guamúchil
Ítalo Mota	32	IF	7 August 1998 (aged 27)	(Mexico) Tecolotes de los Dos Laredos	Mexican League	(Mexico) Mazatlán
José Robledo	20	IF	14 September 2003 (aged 22)	(Mexico) Conspiradores de Querétaro	Mexican League	(Mexico) Monterrey
Jesús Villalobos	76	IF	12 April 2007 (aged 19)	(Mexico) Diablos Rojos del México	Mexican League	(Mexico) San José del Cabo
Carlos Báez	88	OF	8 October 2005 (aged 20)	(Mexico) Charros de Jalisco	Mexican League	(Mexico) Ciudad Obregón
Héctor Hernández	28	OF	27 December 2003 (aged 22)	(Mexico) Olmecas de Tabasco	Mexican League	(Mexico) Puebla
Yordi Martínez	17	OF	29 May 2002 (aged 24)	(Mexico) Piratas de Campeche	Mexican League	(Mexico) Campeche
Christian Morales	12	OF	27 July 2001 (aged 25)	(Mexico) Saraperos de Saltillo	Mexican League	(Mexico) Saltillo

=== Nicaragua ===
Manager: Sandor Guido
Coaches: Jorge Luis Avellán, José Antenor López, Cairo Murillo, Len Picota, Julio Sánchez

Player	No.	Pos.	DOB and age	Team	League	Birthplace
Álvaro Amador	0	P	20 October 1999 (aged 26)	(Nicaragua) Mineros del Caribe	Germán Pomares Championship	Nicaragua
Danilo Bermúdez	43	P	22 March 1999 (aged 27)	(Nicaragua) Frente Sur de Rivas	Germán Pomares Championship	(Nicaragua) Tola
Kenword Burton	10	P	4 August 1998 (aged 27)	(Nicaragua) Caribe Sur	Germán Pomares Championship	(Nicaragua) Bluefields
Keny Cruz	30	P	31 January 2000 (aged 26)	(Nicaragua) Tiburones de Granada	Germán Pomares Championship	(Nicaragua) Granada
Elías Gutiérrez	19	P	11 December 1994 (aged 31)	(Nicaragua) Brumas de Jinotega	Germán Pomares Championship	(Nicaragua) Wiwilí, Jinotega
Walter López	55	P	12 October 1993 (aged 32)	(Nicaragua) Tigres de Chinandega	Germán Pomares Championship	(Nicaragua) Chinandega
Dilmer Mejía	32	P	9 July 1997 (aged 29)	(Nicaragua) Indios del Bóer	Germán Pomares Championship	(Nicaragua) El Sauce
Stanling Orozco	97	P	18 July 2002 (aged 24)	(Nicaragua) Indígenas de Matagalpa	Germán Pomares Championship	(Nicaragua) Ciudad Darío
Bryan Torres	78	P	12 April 2001 (aged 25)	(Nicaragua) Leones de León	Germán Pomares Championship	(Nicaragua) León
Pedro Torres	57	P	19 October 1994 (aged 31)	(Nicaragua) Frente Sur de Rivas	Germán Pomares Championship	(Costa Rica) San José
Sergio Umaña	9	P	21 May 2000 (aged 26)	(Nicaragua) Indios del Bóer	Germán Pomares Championship	(Nicaragua) Nandaime
Melvin Novoa	27	C	17 June 1996 (aged 30)	(Nicaragua) Tiburones de Granada	Germán Pomares Championship	(Nicaragua) Nandaime
Ronald Rivera	23	C	28 November 1993 (aged 32)	(Nicaragua) Tigres de Chinandega	Germán Pomares Championship	(Nicaragua) Chinandega
Benjamín Alegría	1	IF	6 August 1997 (aged 28)	(Nicaragua) Dantos de Managua	Germán Pomares Championship	(Nicaragua) Managua
Cheslor Cuthbert	24	IF	16 November 1992 (aged 33)	(Nicaragua) Indios del Bóer	Germán Pomares Championship	(Nicaragua) Corn Islands
Brandon Leytón	5	IF	17 December 1998 (aged 27)	(Nicaragua) Leones de León	Germán Pomares Championship	(Nicaragua) León
José Orozco	19	IF	6 March 1999 (aged 27)	(Nicaragua) Indígenas de Matagalpa	Germán Pomares Championship	(Nicaragua) Ciudad Darío
Elián Rayo	31	IF	4 March 2003 (aged 23)	(Nicaragua) Indígenas de Matagalpa	Germán Pomares Championship	(Nicaragua) Ciudad Darío
Emanuel Trujillo	19	IF	19 October 2001 (aged 24)	(Nicaragua) Tigres de Chinandega	Germán Pomares Championship	(Nicaragua) Chinandega
Sandy Bermúdez	13	OF	8 September 1994 (aged 31)	(Nicaragua) Toros de Chontales	Germán Pomares Championship	(Nicaragua) Juigalpa
Omar Mendoza	99	OF	30 October 1997 (aged 28)	(Nicaragua) Dantos de Managua	Germán Pomares Championship	(Nicaragua) Villa El Carmen
Luis Montealto	98	OF	7 February 1998 (aged 28)	(Nicaragua) Frente Sur de Rivas	Germán Pomares Championship	(Nicaragua) Rivas
Cristhian Sandoval	95	OF	28 November 1993 (aged 32)	(Nicaragua) Toros de Chontales	Germán Pomares Championship	(Nicaragua) Juigalpa

=== Panama ===
Manager: Alberto Macré
Coaches: Rodolfo Aparicio, Alexander Guerra, Carlos Muñoz, Crispín Poveda, Willy Serrano

Player	No.	Pos.	DOB and age	Team	League	Birthplace
Darío Agrazal	82	P	28 December 1994 (aged 31)	Free agent		(Panama) Aguadulce
Harold Araúz	92	P	29 May 1995 (aged 31)	Free agent		(Panama) Chiriquí
Gilberto Chu	91	P	19 November 1997 (aged 28)	(Panama) Chiriquí	Campeonato de Béisbol Mayor	Panama City
Pedro González	50	P	16 July 2000 (aged 26)	(Panama) Herrera	Campeonato de Béisbol Mayor	Panama
Alberto Guerrero	55	P	13 December 1997 (aged 28)	Free agent		(Panama) Pacora
Kevin Miranda	14	P	14 November 1998 (aged 27)	(Panama) Chiriquí	Campeonato de Béisbol Mayor	(Panama) Dolega
Alain Pérez	99	P	10 March 2004 (aged 22)	(Panama) Bocas del Toro	Campeonato de Béisbol Mayor	Panama
Kevin Rodríguez	8	P	13 August 2000 (aged 25)	(Panama) Panamá Metro	Campeonato de Béisbol Mayor	Panama City
Davis Romero	44	P	30 March 1983 (aged 43)	(Panama) Coclé	Campeonato de Béisbol Mayor	(Panama) Aguadulce
Enrique Saldaña	26	P	26 June 1999 (aged 27)	Free agent		Panama City
Erasmo Caballero	98	C	26 May 2001 (aged 25)	(Panama) Chiriquí	Campeonato de Béisbol Mayor	(Panama) Chiriquí
Mario Sanjur	9	C	23 December 1995 (aged 30)	(Panama) Panamá Oeste	Campeonato de Béisbol Mayor	(Panama) Chiriquí
Arod McKenzie	17	IF	25 May 2005 (aged 21)	(Panama) Panamá Oeste	Campeonato de Béisbol Mayor	Panama City
Edgard Muñoz	10	IF	30 October 1991 (aged 34)	(Panama) Colón	Campeonato de Béisbol Mayor	(Panama) Cristóbal
Jason Patterson	77	IF	13 February 2001 (aged 25)	(Panama) Colón	Campeonato de Béisbol Mayor	Panama
Héctor Rayo	2	IF	2 June 2005 (aged 21)	(Panama) Bocas del Toro	Campeonato de Béisbol Mayor	Panama
Abraham Rodríguez	13	IF	9 March 1999 (aged 27)	(Panama) Panamá Metro	Campeonato de Béisbol Mayor	(Panama) San Miguelito
Joshwan Wright	39	IF	9 November 2000 (aged 25)	(Panama) Bocas del Toro	Campeonato de Béisbol Mayor	(Panama) Changuinola
Juan Alonso	18	OF	3 November 2003 (aged 22)	(Panama) Herrera	Campeonato de Béisbol Mayor	(Panama) Chitré
Luis Castillo	25	OF	15 May 1989 (aged 37)	(Panama) Coclé	Campeonato de Béisbol Mayor	(Panama) Aguadulce
Jael Escobar	16	OF	26 June 2006 (aged 20)	(Panama) Bocas del Toro	Campeonato de Béisbol Mayor	Panama
José Mordock	51	OF	20 August 1999 (aged 26)	(Panama) Veraguas	Campeonato de Béisbol Mayor	Panama
Carlos Mosquera	19	OF	9 January 1996 (aged 30)	(Panama) Darién	Campeonato de Béisbol Mayor	Panama City
Jhonny Santos	21	OF	2 October 1996 (aged 29)	(Panama) Chiriquí	Campeonato de Béisbol Mayor	(Panama) Puerto Armuelles
