= Miguel Mejia =

Miguel Mejia may refer to:

- Miguel Mejia (outfielder) (born 1975), Major League Baseball player
- Miguel Mejía (pitcher) (born 1988), Puerto Rican baseball pitcher
- Miguel Mejía (politician), Dominican politician
- Miguel Mejía Barón (born 1949), Mexican footballer and manager
- Miguel Aceves Mejía (1915–2006), Mexican actor, composer and singer
- Miguel Ángel Mejía Múnera (born 1959), Colombian drug lord and former paramilitary leader
