= Oswaldo Navarro =

Venezuelan baseball player (born 1984)

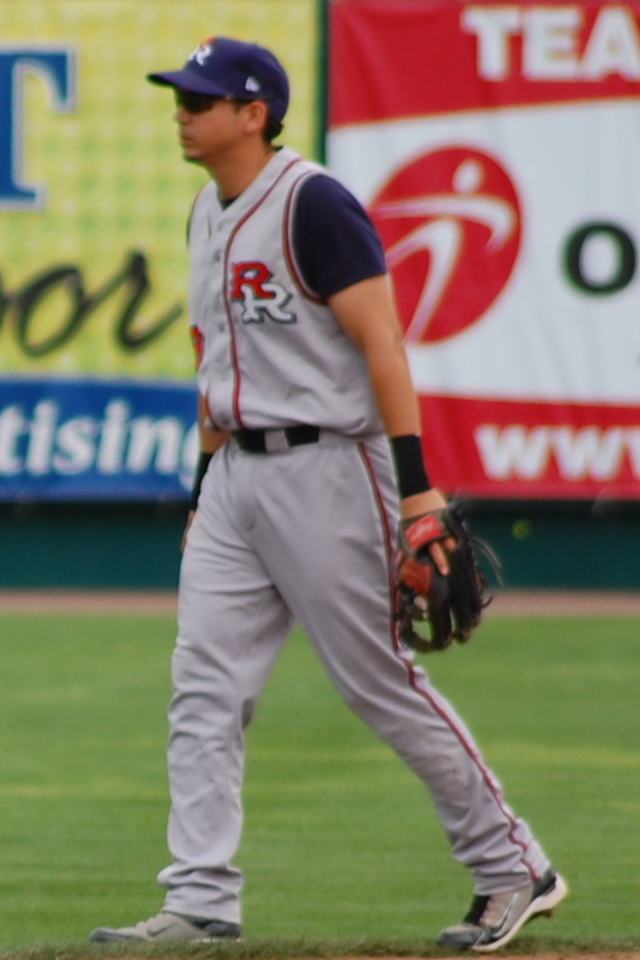
- Navarro with the Round Rock Express in 2010

Marineros de Carabobo
- Shortstop / Coach
- Born: October 2, 1984 (age 41); Villa de Cura, Venezuela
- Batted: Right Threw: Right

MLB debut
- September 9, 2006, for the Seattle Mariners

Last MLB appearance
- July 18, 2010, for the Houston Astros

MLB statistics
- Batting average: .130
- Home runs: 0
- Runs batted in: 0
- Stats at Baseball Reference

Teams
- Seattle Mariners (2006); Houston Astros (2010)

Oswaldo Ramsés Navarro [nah-vahr'-o] (born October 2, 1984) is a Venezuelan former professional baseball shortstop. He played in Major League Baseball (MLB) for the Seattle Mariners and Houston Astros. He was signed by the Mariners as a undrafted free agent in 2001. He is the bench coach for the Marineros de Carabobo of the Venezuelan Major League.

== Career ==
Navarro was a September call-up for the Mariners in 2006. In his first at-bat, he recorded a hit on a bunt. He was granted free agency in 2009 and signed a minor league contract with the Houston Astros on December 8, 2009.

Navarro was called up to the Astros on May 20, 2010, following the release of Kaz Matsui. On September 16, Navarro was designated for assignment to make room on the 40-man roster for Enerio del Rosario. After clearing waivers, Navarro was outrighted to the Astros'Triple-A affiliate.

On March 17, 2012, Navarro signed a minor league deal with the New York Mets. Navarro spent the year at Double-A Binghamton before retiring.

In May 2025, Navarro joined Clemente Álvarez's coaching staff as the bench coach for the Marineros de Carabobo of the Venezuelan Major League. Navarro was named manager of the Venezuela national baseball team at the 2025 Bolivarian Games in Peru.

== Personal life ==
Navarro resides in Maracay, Venezuela with his wife and two sons.

== See also ==
- List of Major League Baseball players from Venezuela
