= Rodney Theophile =

Nicaraguan baseball player (born 1999)

Mississippi Mud Monsters – No. 34
- Pitcher
- Born: September 16, 1999 (age 26); Pearl Lagoon, Nicaragua
- Bats: Right Throws: Right
- Stats at Baseball Reference

Rodney Darien Theophile Cuthbert (born September 16, 1999) is a Nicaraguan professional baseball pitcher for the Mississippi Mud Monsters of the Frontier League.

== Career ==
=== Washington Nationals ===
Theophile grew up on the Caribbean Coast of Nicaragua, in the city of Pearl Lagoon. He began playing baseball at age 12. Originally a first baseman, Theophile was discovered by professional baseball scout Alex Mongrío, who recognized his potential as a pitcher. In 2015, Theophile traveled to the Dominican Republic to train at the MVP Rivera Sport Academy. He participated in an international showcase for Major League Baseball organizations in early 2016 in the Dominican Republic—the only Nicaraguan prospect at that showcase, El Nuevo Diario reported at the time. While training in the Dominican Republic, Theophile sharpened his curveball and improved the velocity of his fastball to top out above 90 miles per hour (140 km/h).

The San Francisco Giants expressed interest in Theophile, reportedly signing him as an international amateur free agent in 2017, shortly after Theophile's 18th birthday. However, the deal was never finalized and ultimately fell through. Theophile, an admirer of Washington Nationals pitcher Max Scherzer, subsequently signed with Washington for a $20,000 bonus. At the time he signed with the Nationals, Theophile was listed at 6 feet 5 inches (1.96 m) and topped out at a reported 94 miles per hour (151 km/h) on his fastball, with a Nationals scout telling La Prensa he expected Theophile to further increase his velocity during the course of his development.

Theophile made his professional debut for the Nationals' rookie-level affiliate, the Gulf Coast League Nationals, but struggled to an 0-4 record and 10.67 ERA with 11 strikeouts in 10 games. Theophile missed the entirety of the 2019 season after undergoing Tommy John surgery. He additionally did not play in a game in 2020 due to the cancellation of the minor league season because of the COVID-19 pandemic.

In 2021, Theophile was assigned to begin the season with the Low-A Fredericksburg Nationals, where he compiled a 4-11 record and 5.56 ERA with 84 strikeouts in 89 innings pitched over 22 starts. In 2022, he pitched for Fredericksburg and the High-A Wilmington Blue Rocks, accumulating a 6-8 record and 3.25 ERA with 110 strikeouts in 102 1/3 innings pitched across 24 games (21 starts). Theophile made 10 appearances (nine starts) for Wilmington in 2023, logging an 0-3 record and 3.48 ERA with 39 strikeouts across 41 1/3 innings pitched.

Theophile split the 2024 season between High-A Wilmington and the Double-A Harrisburg Senators, posting a cumulative 5-6 record and 3.53 ERA with 93 strikeouts in 89 1/3 innings pitched across 20 starts. He elected free agency following the season on November 4, 2024.

=== Mississippi Mud Monsters ===
On March 6, 2025, Theophile signed with the Mississippi Mud Monsters of the Frontier League. On July 8, he signed a contract extension with the team.

== Personal life ==
Theophile is a cousin of infielder Cheslor Cuthbert on his mother's side. His parents separated when he was 8 years old. His father instilled in him an interest in baseball, taking him to games when he was a boy, while his mother, a former member of the Nicaragua women's national basketball team, preferred that he take up basketball instead. Theophile's father died of a heart attack in 2016, at age 39, while Theophile was abroad for training in Panama and the Dominican Republic.
