= Baseball at the 2026 Central American and Caribbean Games =

- Venue: Estadio Quisqueya Juan Marichal
- Location: Santo Domingo, Dominican Republic
- Dates: 31 July–7 August
- Competitors: 192 from 8 nations
- Teams: 8

Medalists
gold medal	Panama
silver medal	Nicaragua
bronze medal	Puerto Rico

The baseball competition at the 2026 Central American and Caribbean Games was held in Santo Domingo, Dominican Republic, from 31 July to 7 August 2026 at the Estadio Quisqueya Juan Marichal.

== Participating nations ==
A total of eight countries qualified athletes. The number of athletes a nation entered is in parentheses beside the name of the country.

- Colombia (24)
- Cuba (24)
- Curaçao (23)
- Dominican Republic (24)
- Mexico (23)
- Nicaragua (23)
- Panama (24)
- Puerto Rico (24)

== Venue ==
Santo Domingo, Dominican Republic	Baseball at the 2026 Central American and Caribbean Games is located in the Dominican Republic
Estadio Quisqueya Juan Marichal	Baseball at the 2026 Central American and Caribbean Games is located in the Dominican Republic

== Medal table ==
* Host nation (Dominican Republic)

Rank	Nation	Gold	Silver	Bronze	Total
1	Panama (PAN)	1	0	0	1
2	Nicaragua (NCA)	0	1	0	1
3	Puerto Rico (PUR)	0	0	1	1
Totals (3 entries)		1	1	1	3

== Medal summary ==
Event	Gold	Silver	Bronze
Men's tournament	Panama; Darío Agrazal; Juan Alonso; Harold Araúz; Erasmo Caballero; Luis Castillo; Gilberto Chu; Jael Escobar; Pedro González; Alberto Guerrero; Arod McKenzie; Kevin Miranda; José Mordock; Carlos Mosquera; Edgard Muñoz; Jason Patterson; Alain Pérez; Héctor Rayo; Abraham Rodríguez; Kevin Rodríguez; Davis Romero; Enrique Saldaña; Mario Sanjur; Jhonny Santos; Joshwan Wright Manager: Alberto Macré	Nicaragua; Benjamín Alegría; Álvaro Amador; Danilo Bermúdez; Sandy Bermúdez; Kenword Burton; Keny Cruz; Cheslor Cuthbert; Elías Gutiérrez; Brandon Leytón; Walter López; Dilmer Mejía; Omar Mendoza; Elián Miranda; Luis Montealto; Melvin Novoa; José Orozco; Stanling Orozco; Elián Rayo; Ronald Rivera; Cristhian Sandoval; Bryan Torres; Pedro Torres; Emanuel Trujillo; Sergio Umaña Manager: Sandor Guido	Puerto Rico; Miguel Ausúa; Jorge Benítez; Anthony Borrero; Kerby Camacho; Rubén Castro; Luis Cintrón; Luis Cruz; Sidney Duprey; Anthony García; Héctor Hernández; Jan Hernández; Jorhan Laboy; Kevin Luciano; Miguel Mejía; Edison Mora; Roberto Peña; Noel Pinto; Rubén Ramírez; José Rivera; Yadiel Rivera; Jadiel Sánchez; Kevin Santa; Alexis Torres; Joshua Torres Manager: Juan González

== First round ==
=== Group A ===
Pos	Team	Pld	W	L	RF	RA	RD	PCT	GB	Qualification
1	Cuba	3	3	0	17	7	+10	1.000	—	Advance to Super Round
2	Puerto Rico	3	2	1	12	11	+1	.667	1	Advance to Super Round
3	Dominican Republic (H)	3	1	2	20	14	+6	.333	2	Advance to Super Round
4	Curaçao	3	0	3	6	23	−17	.000	3	Advance to Placement game

Source: WBSC Americas
(H) Hosts

31 July 2026; 10:00 (UTC–4)	Curaçao	1–4 (F/5)	Cuba	Estadio Quisqueya, Santo Domingo; Attendance: 125
31 July 2026; 10:00 (UTC–4)		Boxscore		Estadio Quisqueya, Santo Domingo; Attendance: 125

31 July 2026; 20:30 (UTC–4)	Dominican Republic	3–4 (F/8)	Puerto Rico	Estadio Quisqueya, Santo Domingo; Attendance: 4,234
31 July 2026; 20:30 (UTC–4)		Boxscore		Estadio Quisqueya, Santo Domingo; Attendance: 4,234

1 August 2026; 17:00 (UTC–4)	Cuba	4–0	Puerto Rico	Estadio Quisqueya, Santo Domingo; Attendance: 178
1 August 2026; 17:00 (UTC–4)		Boxscore		Estadio Quisqueya, Santo Domingo; Attendance: 178

1 August 2026; 20:30 (UTC–4)	Curaçao	1–11 (F/5)	Dominican Republic	Estadio Quisqueya, Santo Domingo; Attendance: 1,345
1 August 2026; 20:30 (UTC–4)		Boxscore		Estadio Quisqueya, Santo Domingo; Attendance: 1,345

2 August 2026; 13:30 (UTC–4)	Puerto Rico	8–4	Curaçao	Estadio Quisqueya, Santo Domingo; Attendance: 292
2 August 2026; 13:30 (UTC–4)		Boxscore		Estadio Quisqueya, Santo Domingo; Attendance: 292

2 August 2026; 20:30 (UTC–4)	Cuba	9–6 (F/8)	Dominican Republic	Estadio Quisqueya, Santo Domingo; Attendance: 4,050
2 August 2026; 20:30 (UTC–4)		Boxscore		Estadio Quisqueya, Santo Domingo; Attendance: 4,050

=== Group B ===
Pos	Team	Pld	W	L	RF	RA	RD	PCT	GB	Qualification
1	Panama	3	3	0	8	2	+6	1.000	—	Advance to Super Round
2	Nicaragua	3	2	1	5	2	+3	.667	1	Advance to Super Round
3	Colombia	3	1	2	13	9	+4	.333	2	Advance to Super Round
4	Mexico	3	0	3	5	18	−13	.000	3	Advance to Placement game

Source: WBSC Americas

31 July 2026; 13:30 (UTC–4)	Nicaragua	3–1	Colombia	Estadio Quisqueya, Santo Domingo; Attendance: 203
31 July 2026; 13:30 (UTC–4)		Boxscore		Estadio Quisqueya, Santo Domingo; Attendance: 203

31 July 2026; 17:00 (UTC–4)	Panama	4–2	Mexico	Estadio Quisqueya, Santo Domingo
31 July 2026; 17:00 (UTC–4)		Boxscore		Estadio Quisqueya, Santo Domingo

1 August 2026; 10:00 (UTC–4)	Colombia	12–3	Mexico	Estadio Quisqueya, Santo Domingo; Attendance: 53
1 August 2026; 10:00 (UTC–4)		Boxscore		Estadio Quisqueya, Santo Domingo; Attendance: 53

1 August 2026; 13:30 (UTC–4)	Nicaragua	0–1	Panama	Estadio Quisqueya, Santo Domingo; Attendance: 71
1 August 2026; 13:30 (UTC–4)		Boxscore		Estadio Quisqueya, Santo Domingo; Attendance: 71

2 August 2026; 10:00 (UTC–4)	Colombia	0–3	Panama	Estadio Quisqueya, Santo Domingo; Attendance: 121
2 August 2026; 10:00 (UTC–4)		Boxscore		Estadio Quisqueya, Santo Domingo; Attendance: 121

2 August 2026; 17:00 (UTC–4)	Mexico	0–2	Nicaragua	Estadio Quisqueya, Santo Domingo; Attendance: 450
2 August 2026; 17:00 (UTC–4)		Boxscore		Estadio Quisqueya, Santo Domingo; Attendance: 450

== Placement game ==
3 August 2026 13:00 at Estadio Quisqueya in Santo Domingo
Team	1	2	3	4	5	6	7	R	H	E
Mexico	0	0	0	0	0	0	0	0	3	1
Curaçao	1	0	0	0	0	0	X	1	5	1
WP: Jordan Lucas LP: Daniel Zazueta; Attendance: 51; Boxscore

== Super Round ==
Pos	Team	Pld	W	L	RF	RA	RD	PCT	GB	Qualification
1	Panama	5	4	1	15	9	+6	.800	—	Advance to Gold medal match
2	Nicaragua	5	3	2	18	15	+3	.600 (Note: Nicaragua defeated Cuba, 6–5, and Puerto Rico, 9–3)	1	Advance to Gold medal match
3	Cuba	5	3	2	23	18	+5	.600 (Note: Cuba defeated Puerto Rico in the First round, 4–0)	1	Advance to Bronze medal match
4	Puerto Rico	5	3	2	19	23	−4	.600	1	Advance to Bronze medal match
5	Dominican Republic (H)	5	2	3	22	18	+4	.400	2	
6	Colombia	5	0	5	8	22	−14	.000	4	

Source: WBSC Americas
(H) Hosts
Notes:

4 August 2026; 11:00 (UTC–4)	Colombia	6–8	Puerto Rico	Estadio Quisqueya, Santo Domingo; Attendance: 125
4 August 2026; 11:00 (UTC–4)		Boxscore		Estadio Quisqueya, Santo Domingo; Attendance: 125

4 August 2026; 15:00 (UTC–4)	Cuba	2–6	Panama	Estadio Quisqueya, Santo Domingo; Attendance: 105
4 August 2026; 15:00 (UTC–4)		Boxscore		Estadio Quisqueya, Santo Domingo; Attendance: 105

4 August 2026; 19:00 (UTC–4)	Dominican Republic	5–0	Nicaragua	Estadio Quisqueya, Santo Domingo; Attendance: 450
4 August 2026; 19:00 (UTC–4)		Boxscore		Estadio Quisqueya, Santo Domingo; Attendance: 450

5 August 2026; 11:00 (UTC–4)	Colombia	0–3	Cuba	Estadio Quisqueya, Santo Domingo; Attendance: 93
5 August 2026; 11:00 (UTC–4)		Boxscore		Estadio Quisqueya, Santo Domingo; Attendance: 93

5 August 2026; 15:00 (UTC–4)	Nicaragua	9–3	Puerto Rico	Estadio Quisqueya, Santo Domingo; Attendance: 302
5 August 2026; 15:00 (UTC–4)		Boxscore		Estadio Quisqueya, Santo Domingo; Attendance: 302

5 August 2026; 22:30 (UTC–4)	Dominican Republic	3–4	Panama	Estadio Quisqueya, Santo Domingo; Attendance: 215
5 August 2026; 22:30 (UTC–4)		Boxscore		Estadio Quisqueya, Santo Domingo; Attendance: 215

6 August 2026; 11:00 (UTC–4)	Nicaragua	6–5	Cuba	Estadio Quisqueya, Santo Domingo; Attendance: 42
6 August 2026; 11:00 (UTC–4)		Boxscore		Estadio Quisqueya, Santo Domingo; Attendance: 42

6 August 2026; 15:00 (UTC–4)	Puerto Rico	4–1	Panama	Estadio Quisqueya, Santo Domingo; Attendance: 73
6 August 2026; 15:00 (UTC–4)		Boxscore		Estadio Quisqueya, Santo Domingo; Attendance: 73

5 August 2026; 22:30 (UTC–4)	Colombia	1–5	Dominican Republic	Estadio Quisqueya, Santo Domingo; Attendance: 272
5 August 2026; 22:30 (UTC–4)		Boxscore		Estadio Quisqueya, Santo Domingo; Attendance: 272

== Bronze medal match ==
7 August 2026 13:00 at Estadio Quisqueya in Santo Domingo
Team	1	2	3	4	5	6	7	R	H	E
Puerto Rico	0	0	4	4	1	0	0	0	3	1
Cuba	0	0	1	0	0	0	0	1	5	1
WP: Luis Cruz LP: Randy Cueto; Attendance: 275; Boxscore

== Gold medal match ==
7 August 2026 17:00 at Estadio Quisqueya in Santo Domingo
Team	1	2	3	4	5	6	7	8	R	H	E
Nicaragua	0	0	0	0	0	0	0	0	0	3	1
Panama	0	0	0	0	0	0	0	1	1	5	1
WP: Kevin Miranda LP: Keny Cruz; Attendance: 123; Boxscore

== Final standings ==
Pos	Team	W	L
Gold medal	Panama	6	1
Silver medal	Nicaragua	4	3
Bronze medal	Puerto Rico	5	2
4	Cuba	4	3
5	Dominican Republic	3	3
6	Colombia	1	5
7	Curaçao	1	3
8	Mexico	0	4

== Statistical leaders ==
=== Batting ===
Statistic	Name	Total
Batting average	(Cuba) Luis Vicente Mateo	.500
Hits	(Cuba) Luis Vicente Mateo	12
Runs	(Puerto Rico) Rubén Castro	7
Home runs	(Cuba) Luis Vicente Mateo	2
Home runs	(Panama) Carlos Mosquera	2
Runs batted in	(Cuba) Yoel Yanqui	8
Stolen bases	(Puerto Rico) Kevin Santa	3
Slugging percentage	(Curaçao) Phildrick Llewellyn	.900

=== Pitching ===
Statistic	Name	Total
Wins	4 tied with (Note: José Ignacio Bermúdez, Anthony Borrero, Kevin Miranda, Esmil Rogers)	2
Losses	(Nicaragua) Keny Cruz	2
Losses	(Colombia) Luis Escobar	2
Saves	(Nicaragua) Kenword Burton	2
Saves	(Panama) Gilberto Chu	2
Innings pitched	(Panama) Darío Agrazal	14.0
Earned runs allowed	13 tied with	0.00
Strikeouts	(Nicaragua) Danilo Bermúdez	13
