= Diego Moreno (baseball) =

Venezuelan baseball player (born 1987)

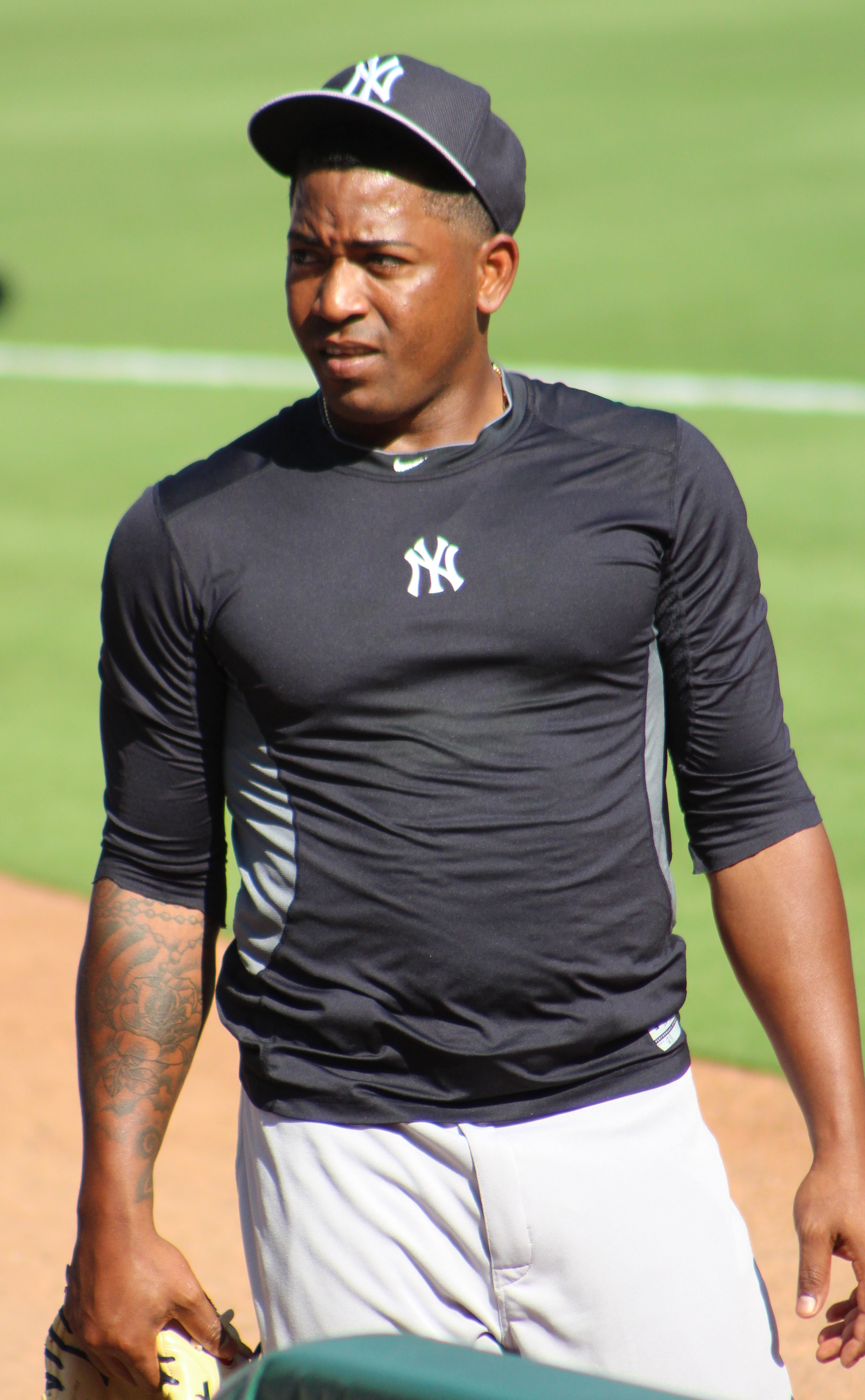
- Moreno with the New York Yankees

Caciques de Distrito – No. 63
- Pitcher
- Born: July 21, 1987 (age 39); Higuerote, Miranda, Venezuela
- Batted: Right Threw: Right

Professional debut
- MLB: June 22, 2015, for the New York Yankees
- NPB: April 27, 2018, for the Hanshin Tigers

Last appearance
- MLB: May 21, 2017, for the Tampa Bay Rays
- NPB: September 27, 2018, for the Hanshin Tigers

MLB statistics
- Win–loss record: 1–1
- Earned run average: 5.06
- Strikeouts: 14

NPB statistics
- Win–loss record: 0–0
- Earned run average: 2.70
- Strikeouts: 6
- Stats at Baseball Reference

Teams
- New York Yankees (2015); Tampa Bay Rays (2017); Hanshin Tigers (2018)

Diego Rafael Moreno (born July 21, 1987) is a Venezuelan professional baseball pitcher for the Caciques de Distrito of the Venezuelan Major League. He has previously played in Major League Baseball (MLB) for the New York Yankees and the Tampa Bay Rays and in Nippon Professional Baseball (NPB) for the Hanshin Tigers.

== Career ==
=== Pittsburgh Pirates ===
On August 21, 2006, Moreno signed with the Pittsburgh Pirates organization as an international free agent. He made his professional debut with the Venezuelan Summer League Pirates in 2007, recording a 2.42 ERA in 13 games. He returned to the team in 2008, registering a 3-1 record and 0.87 ERA in 7 appearances. In 2009, Moreno split the season between the Low-A State College Spikes and the Single-A West Virginia Power, accumulating a 2.52 ERA with 61 strikeouts in 50.0 innings of work. The following season, Moreno split the year between the High-A Bradenton Marauders and the Double-A Altoona Curve, posting a 4-1 record and 2.15 ERA in 35 appearances. In 2011, Moreno again split the year between Altoona and Bradenton, logging a 3.63 ERA with 45 strikeouts in 45.2 innings pitched.67

=== New York Yankees ===
On February 19, 2012, Moreno was traded by the Pirates alongside Exicardo Cayones to the New York Yankees in exchange for A. J. Burnett. Prior to his acquisition, the Yankees had contemplated taking Moreno in the Rule 5 draft. Moreno did not play in a game in 2012 due to injury. In 2013, Moreno split the season between the High-A Tampa Yankees and the Double-A Trenton Thunder, posting a 3-4 record and 3.89 ERA in 24 appearances. The next season, Moreno split the year between Trenton and the Triple-A Scranton/Wilkes-Barre RailRiders, pitching to a cumulative 4.06 ERA with 55 strikeouts in 57.2 innings of work.

On June 21, 2015, Moreno was selected to the 40-man roster and promoted to the major leagues for the first time. He made his MLB debut the following day, pitching a scoreless inning of relief against the Philadelphia Phillies. In a July 28 start against the Texas Rangers, Moreno threw 5 1/3 scoreless innings, while allowing no hits, one walk, and five strikeouts, en route to getting his first career win. Moreno was placed on the disabled list on August 2 with right elbow inflammation and finished his rookie season with a 5.23 ERA in 4 big league games. On November 2, Moreno was activated off of the disabled list and outrighted off of the 40-man roster. He elected free agency and re-signed with the Yankees on a minor league contract on November 30. Moreno recorded a 7-1 record and 4.82 ERA in 32 games between Scranton and Trenton before he was released on August 19, 2016.

=== Tampa Bay Rays ===
On December 22, 2016, Moreno signed a minor league deal with the Tampa Bay Rays organization. On May 9, 2017, Moreno was recalled to the major league roster. Moreno recorded a 4.76 ERA in 5 games with the Rays before he was placed on the disabled list on May 24 with right shoulder bursitis. He spent time rehabbing with the High-A Charlotte Stone Crabs and the Triple-A Durham Bulls. On July 27, Moreno was designated for assignment by the Rays following the acquisition of Dan Jennings.

=== Cleveland Indians ===
On July 29, 2017, Moreno was claimed off waivers by the Cleveland Indians. He was assigned to the Triple-A Columbus Clippers, where he made 6 appearances before being designated for assignment on August 26. He finished his stint with Columbus with an excellent 0.73 ERA in 9 games. On October 5, he elected free agency.

=== Hanshin Tigers ===
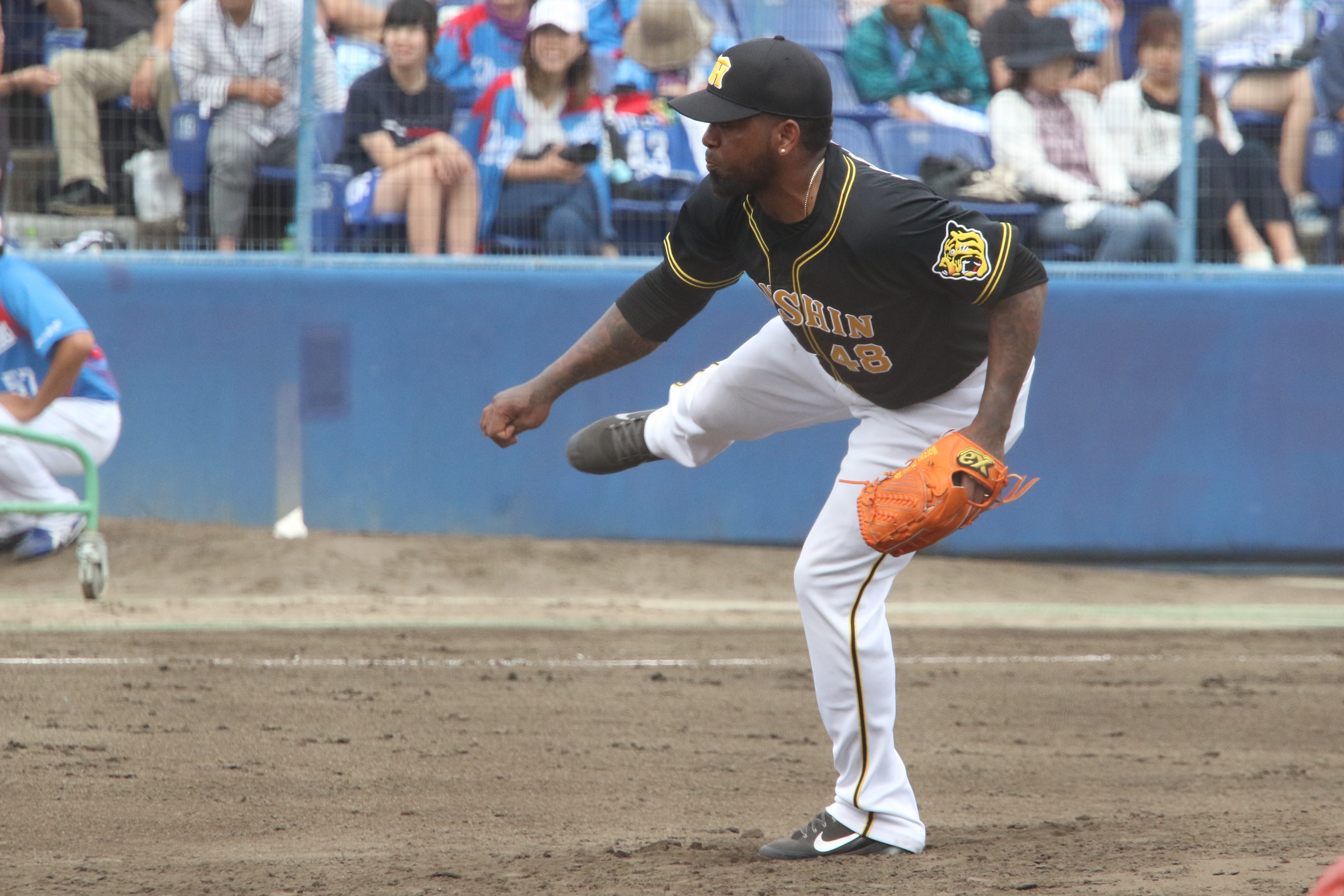
Moreno with the Hanshin Tigers in 2018

On November 11, 2017, Moreno signed with the Hanshin Tigers of Nippon Professional Baseball (NPB). Moreno spent the majority of the year with Hanshin's farm team, but made 8 appearances with the main club, where he posted a 2.70 ERA with 6 strikeouts in 6.2 innings pitched. He became a free agent following the 2018 season.

=== Generales de Durango ===
On June 10, 2019, Moreno signed with the Generales de Durango of the Mexican League. Moreno made five appearances for Durango in 2019, pitching to a 3-0 record and a 5.68 ERA with 17 strikeouts in 25.1 innings pitched. Moreno did not play for the team in 2020 due to the cancellation of the Mexican League season because of the COVID-19 pandemic.

=== West Virginia Power ===
On March 15, 2021, Moreno signed with the West Virginia Power of the Atlantic League of Professional Baseball. He had pitched in Single-A with the Power in 2009 while in the Pirates organization. In 9 appearances with the Power, Moreno logged a 3.38 ERA with 15 strikeouts in 10.2 innings of work.

=== Washington Nationals ===
On July 4, 2021, Moreno signed a minor league contract with the Washington Nationals organization.

=== Wild Health Genomes ===
On March 15, 2022, Moreno signed with the Wild Health Genomes of the Atlantic League of Professional Baseball.

=== Generales de Durango (second stint) ===
On June 9, 2022, Moreno signed with the Generales de Durango of the Mexican League. He made 17 appearances as a reliever, posting a 1–2 record with a 6.35 ERA in 17 innings of work. In 2023, Moreno went 2–1 with a 4.70 ERA in 10 relief appearances before he was released on May 15.

=== Caciques de Distrito ===
In 2025, Moreno signed with the Caciques de Distrito of the Venezuelan Major League.

== See also ==
- List of Major League Baseball players from Venezuela
