= Carlos Navas =

Venezuelan baseball player (born 1992)

Marineros de Carabobo – No. 65
- Pitcher
- Born: August 13, 1992 (age 33); Puerto Cabello, Venezuela
- Bats: Right Throws: Right
- Stats at Baseball Reference

Carlos Manuel Navas (born August 13, 1992) is a Venezuelan professional baseball pitcher for the Marineros de Carabobo of the Venezuelan Major League. He signed with the Oakland Athletics organization in 2010 as an international free agent.

== Career ==
=== Oakland Athletics ===
Navas signed with the Oakland Athletics organization on May 26, 2010, as an international free agent. He made his professional debut with the DSL Athletics, posting a 1.66 ERA in 13 appearances. He only played in 1 game for the team the following year, and registered a 4–5 record and 1.38 ERA in 14 games with the team in 2012. In 2013, Navas played for the AZL Athletics, recording a 1–2 record and 4.83 ERA in 12 games. He returned to the team the next season, pitching to a 6–5 record and 3.30 ERA in 13 games, 11 of them starts. In 2015, Navas split the season between the Single-A Beloit Snappers and the High-A Stockton Ports, accumulating a 3–2 record and 2.79 ERA with 78 strikeouts in 67.2 innings of work. For the 2016 season, Navas played with Stockton and the Triple-A Nashville Sounds, posting a cumulative 3–7 record and 3.92 ERA in 44 appearances. He split the 2017 season between Stockton and the Double-A Midland RockHounds, pitching to a 6–4 record and 2.55 ERA with 76 strikeouts in 70.2 innings pitched. On November 6, 2017, he elected free agency.

=== Cincinnati Reds ===
On March 22, 2018, Navas signed a minor league deal with the Cincinnati Reds organization. He spent the year with the Double-A Pensacola Blue Wahoos, posting a 4–3 record and 3.19 ERA in 39 appearances. Navas elected free agency following the season on November 2.

=== San Francisco Giants ===
On January 24, 2019, Navas signed a minor league contract with the San Francisco Giants that included an invitation to spring training. He failed to make the club out of spring and was assigned to the Double–A Richmond Flying Squirrels. Navas split the 2019 season with Richmond and the Triple–A Sacramento River Cats, accumulating a 2–7 record and 3.40 ERA in 35 games. Navas did not play in a game in 2020 due to the cancellation of the minor league season because of the COVID-19 pandemic. He elected free agency on November 2, 2020.

=== Arizona Diamondbacks ===
On February 11, 2021, Navas signed a minor league contract with the Arizona Diamondbacks organization that included an invitation to spring training. Navas struggled to an 8.51 ERA in 21 appearances with the Triple-A Reno Aces and was released by the organization on July 15.

=== Washington Nationals ===
On July 22, 2021, Navas signed a minor league contract with the Washington Nationals organization. Navas appeared in 15 games for the Double-A Harrisburg Senators, posting a 4.95 ERA with 27 strikeouts and 2 saves in 20.0 innings pitched. He elected free agency following the season on November 7.

=== Piratas de Campeche ===
On March 10, 2023, Navas signed with the Piratas de Campeche of the Mexican League. In 39 relief appearances, Navas recorded a 3.35 ERA with 42 strikeouts across 43 innings pitched.

=== Rieleros de Aguascalientes ===
On March 12, 2024, Navas signed with the Rieleros de Aguascalientes of the Mexican League. In 13 games for the Rieleros, he struggled to a 7.82 ERA with 12 strikeouts and 2 saves across 12 2/3 innings pitched. On May 20, Navas was released by Aguascalientes.

=== Dorados de Chihuahua ===
On May 30, 2024, Navas signed with the Dorados de Chihuahua of the Mexican League. In 23 appearances for Chihuahua, he compiled a 2–2 record and 5.40 ERA with 20 strikeouts across 18 1/3 innings pitched. Navas was released by the Dorados on October 23.

== International career ==
Navas was selected as a member of the Venezuela national baseball team at the 2017 World Baseball Classic.
