= Kevin Maitán =

Venezuelan baseball player (born 2000)

Caciques de Distrito – No. 55
- Shortstop
- Born: February 12, 2000 (age 26); Puerto Cabello, Venezuela
- Bats: Switch Throws: Right
- Stats at Baseball Reference

Kevin Francisco Maitán Hernández (born February 12, 2000) is a Venezuelan professional baseball shortstop for the Caciques de Distrito of the Venezuelan Major League.

== Professional career ==
=== Atlanta Braves ===
Maitán was considered the top international prospect for the 2016 class. Though a natural shortstop, Maitán has most often been projected as a third baseman in professional baseball. He has been called the best international free agent since Miguel Sanó in 2009 and has been compared to Miguel Cabrera and Chipper Jones. He signed with the Atlanta Braves on July 2, receiving a $4.25 million signing bonus. Maitán arrived in the United States in September to begin his professional career at the instructional league. He made his debut with the Rookie-level Gulf Coast League Braves on July 3, 2017, and after batting .314 with a .751 OPS in nine games, he was promoted to the Rookie Advanced Danville Braves, where he finished 2017, posting a .220 average with two home runs and 15 RBIs.

On October 2, 2017, Braves general manager John Coppolella and international scouting director Gordon Blakely resigned after an MLB investigation into their activities discovered several rules violations regarding international signings. On November 21, MLB ordered that Maitan and several other players were released from their contracts and declared to be free agents.

=== Los Angeles Angels ===
Maitán signed with the Los Angeles Angels, receiving a $2.2 million signing bonus. He played for the Orem Owlz of the Advanced Rookie-level Pioneer League in 2018. In 2019, he was promoted to the Single-A Burlington Bees. He played 123 games and finished with a slash line of .214/.278/.323. Maitán did not play in a game in 2020 due to the cancellation of the minor league season because of the COVID-19 pandemic.

In 2021, Maitán split the year between the rookie-level Arizona Complex League Angels and the High-A Tri-City Dust Devils. In 37 games, he batted a cumulative .212/.261/.258 with one home run and 13 RBI. Maitán spent the 2022 season with the Double-A Rocket City Trash Pandas, playing in 114 games and hitting .261/.338/.399 with 11 home runs and 45 RBI (both one under his career-highs). In 2023, he played in 53 games for Rocket City, struggling to a .192/.300/.256 batting line with 1 home run and 15 RBI. On June 19, 2023, Maitán was released by the Angels organization.

=== Lake Country DockHounds ===
On July 21, 2023, Maitán signed with the Lake Country DockHounds of the American Association of Professional Baseball. In 9 games, he went 4–for–33 (.121) with 3 RBI and 3 walks. On August 2, Maitán was released by the team.

=== Charleston Dirty Birds ===
On April 24, 2024, Maitán signed with the Charleston Dirty Birds of the Atlantic League of Professional Baseball. In 14 games for the Dirty Birds, Maitán hit .333/.410/.611 with three home runs and 14 RBI.

=== Minnesota Twins ===
On May 13, 2024, Maitán's contract was purchased by the Minnesota Twins organization. He was subsequently assigned to the High-A Cedar Rapids Kernels, for whom he made 75 appearances and batted .246/.296/.389 with eight home runs, 35 RBI, and two stolen bases.

In 2025, Maitán made 26 appearances split between Cedar Rapids and the Single-A Fort Myers Mighty Mussels, batting a combined .218/.296/.310 with eight RBI. Maitán was released by the Twins organization on May 30, 2025.

=== Caciques de Distrito ===
On June 13, 2025, Maitan signed with the Caciques de Distrito of the Venezuelan Major League.
