= José Mesa =

Dominican baseball player (born 1966)

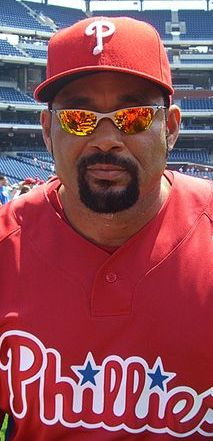
- Mesa with the Philadelphia Phillies
- Pitcher
- Born: May 22, 1966 (age 59); Pueblo Viejo, Dominican Republic
- Batted: Right Threw: Right

MLB debut
- September 10, 1987, for the Baltimore Orioles

Last MLB appearance
- September 29, 2007, for the Philadelphia Phillies

MLB statistics
- Games pitched: 1,022
- Win–loss record: 80–109
- Earned run average: 4.36
- Strikeouts: 1,038
- Saves: 321
- Stats at Baseball Reference

Teams
- Baltimore Orioles (1987, 1990–1992); Cleveland Indians (1992–1998); San Francisco Giants (1998); Seattle Mariners (1999–2000); Philadelphia Phillies (2001–2003); Pittsburgh Pirates (2004–2005); Colorado Rockies (2006); Detroit Tigers (2007); Philadelphia Phillies (2007)

Career highlights and awards
- 2× All-Star (1995, 1996); AL Rolaids Relief Man Award (1995); AL saves leader (1995)

José Ramón Nova Mesa (Spanish: [xoˈse ˈmesa]; born May 22, 1966) is a Dominican former professional baseball pitcher who played in Major League Baseball from 1987 through 2007. He played for the Baltimore Orioles, Cleveland Indians, San Francisco Giants, Seattle Mariners, Philadelphia Phillies, Pittsburgh Pirates, Colorado Rockies, and Detroit Tigers. He retired with 321 career saves.

Mesa was a two-time MLB All-Star and won the American League (AL) Rolaids Relief Man Award in 1995, when he led the AL in saves. His nickname was "Joe Table", the literal translation of his name in the English language.

== Professional career ==
=== Toronto Blue Jays organization and Baltimore Orioles ===
Originally an outfielder, Mesa was signed as an amateur free agent by the Toronto Blue Jays on October 31, 1981. He spent the first six seasons of his career pitching in the Blue Jays' minor league system. Mesa was traded from the Blue Jays to the Baltimore Orioles on September 4, 1987, completing a transaction from four days prior on August 31 when Oswaldo Peraza was traded to Baltimore for Mike Flanagan.

Mesa began his major league career as a starting pitcher with the Orioles, who hoped that Mesa's superior fastball would earn him success in the starting role. He made his major league debut on September 10, 1987 against the Boston Red Sox, four days after being traded. Mesa allowed three earned runs on seven hits while striking out four in six innings, earning a no decision in Baltimore's 5–4 loss. On September 30, Mesa finished one out shy of a complete game against the Detroit Tigers. Nonetheless, he still earned his first major league win, allowing three earned runs in 8 2/3 innings. He finished the season 1–3 with a 6.05 ERA in six games (five starts). Mesa then spent the next two years pitching in the Baltimore system before returning in 1990. He pitched well upon his return, going 3–2 with a 3.86 ERA in seven starts.

Mesa was named a member of Baltimore's starting rotation in 1991. He got off to a good start, posting an ERA of 3.33 in April despite posting a 1–3 record. On May 6, Mesa recorded his first career complete game shutout against the California Angels, allowing seven hits (all singles) while striking out two in the 7–0 win. The game lowered his ERA to a sparkling 2.23. However, his season began to spiral in June, and he ultimately finished with a 6–11 record, a 5.97 ERA, and two complete games in 23 starts. Mesa ultimately remained in the rotation in 1992, and was 3–8 with a 5.19 ERA in his first 13 games (12 starts).

=== Cleveland Indians ===
On July 14, 1992 Mesa was traded from the Orioles to the Cleveland Indians for minor league outfielder Kyle Washington. In 15 starts with Cleveland, Mesa was 4–4 with a 4.16 ERA. Cleveland continued to use Mesa as a starter through the end of 1993; that year, Mesa pitched a career-high 208 2/3 innings, but posted a 10–12 record in 34 games (33 starts), and his ERA of 4.92 was worse than the league average for the fifth consecutive season.

Mesa became a relief pitcher for the Indians in 1994, and for the first season of his career, he posted an ERA better than the league average. In 51 relief appearances, he was 7–5 with two saves and a 3.82 ERA. In the role of closer during the 1995 season, Mesa pitched superbly; in 64 innings pitched over 62 appearances, Mesa went 3–0, had a 1.13 ERA, and saved 46 games in 48 chances. 38 of Mesa's 46 saves were recorded in consecutive appearances in save situations; this was a major-league record at the time. Mesa's performance in 1995 was critical in the Indians' 100–44 regular-season record and their first World Series appearance since 1954. That year, Mesa finished second in AL Cy Young voting and fourth in AL MVP voting. In the 1995 postseason, Mesa went 1–0 with two saves and a 2.70 ERA in eight appearances. Mesa earned his win in Game 3 of the 1995 World Series, tossing three scoreless innings in Cleveland's eventual 7–6 victory in 11 innings. The Indians ultimately lost the series in six games to the Atlanta Braves.

Mesa had another solid season as closer in 1996, finishing 2–7 with 39 saves and a 3.73 ERA in 69 relief appearances. In the postseason, Mesa allowed a game-winning home run in the 12th inning to Roberto Alomar in Game 4 of the 1996 American League Division Series against the Baltimore Orioles. He ultimately earned the loss in the series-clinching 4–3 defeat.

In 1997, Mesa was 4–4 with 16 saves and a 2.40 ERA in 66 games, helping the Indians to their second World Series appearance in three seasons. However, he failed to hold a one-run lead in the ninth inning of Game 7 of the 1997 World Series, and the Indians went on to lose the game and series to the Florida Marlins. Mesa began the 1998 season pitching in a setup role to new closer Mike Jackson, going 3–4 with one save and a 5.17 ERA in 44 games with Cleveland.

=== San Francisco Giants ===
On July 24, 1998, Mesa was traded to the San Francisco Giants along with Shawon Dunston and Alvin Morman in exchange for Steve Reed and Jacob Cruz. In 32 games with San Francisco, Mesa went 5–3 with a 3.52 ERA. He became a free agent after the season.

=== Seattle Mariners ===
Mesa signed a two-year deal with the Seattle Mariners on November 12, 1998. The deal included an option for the 2001 season. He was immediately named the team's closer for the 1999 season by manager Lou Piniella after his signing. Despite recording 33 saves, Mesa went 3–6 with a 4.98 ERA in 68 games. In the offseason, the Mariners signed Kazuhiro Sasaki to serve as closer, moving Mesa back to a setup role. He ultimately finished the 2000 season with a 4–6 record, one save and a 5.36 ERA in 66 relief appearances. In the 2000 postseason, Mesa was 1–0 with an ERA of 8.53 in five games, including a 12.46 mark in the 2000 ALCS, which the Mariners lost in six games to the New York Yankees. After the season, Mesa's option was declined by the Mariners, making him a free agent.

=== Philadelphia Phillies ===
On November 17, 2000, Mesa signed a two-year, $6.8 million contract with the Philadelphia Phillies. Returning to the closer role, Mesa immediately found success in 2001, finishing 3–3 with 42 saves and a 2.34 ERA in 71 relief appearances. He ranked fifth in the National League in saves and fourth in games finished (59). Mesa enjoyed another successful season in 2002, posting a record of 4–6, 45 saves and a 2.97 ERA in 74 appearances. However, in 2003, he regressed, going 5–7 with 24 saves and a 6.52 ERA in 61 games. Mesa was granted free agency at the end of the season.

=== Pittsburgh Pirates ===
On February 3, 2004, Mesa signed a minor league contract with the Pittsburgh Pirates. After a strong performance in spring training, the Pirates announced that he had earned a roster spot on April 1. Mesa enjoyed a great season as the Pirates' closer, going 5–2 with 43 saves and a 3.25 ERA in 70 relief appearances.

Mesa re-signed with the Pirates on a one-year contract for 2005 on November 11, 2004. During the season, he was 2–8 with 27 saves and a 4.76 ERA in 55 games. While with the Pirates, Mesa tied a franchise record by converting 23 consecutive save chances from August 24, 2004 until May 15, 2005.

=== Colorado Rockies ===
On December 8, 2005, Mesa agreed to a one-year, $2.5 million deal with the Colorado Rockies. The deal included a $3 million option for 2007. Mesa made a career-high 79 relief appearances with the Rockies in 2006, going 1–5 with one save and a 3.86 ERA. The Rockies declined his option after the season, and he elected free agency.

=== Detroit Tigers and return to Philadelphia ===
On December 11, 2006, Mesa signed a one-year, $2.5 million contract with the Detroit Tigers. He was released by the team on June 3, 2007. In 16 appearances with the Tigers, he was 1–1 with a 12.34 ERA.

On June 8, 2007, Mesa signed a deal to return to the Phillies. He appeared in 40 games for the Phillies, compiling a 1–2 record with a 5.54 ERA, and retired following the 2007 season.

== Highlights ==
- American League All-Star (twice, 1995–96)
- Relief Man of the Year Award (1995)
- TSN Reliever of the Year Award (1995)
- Led AL in saves (46, 1995)
- Led AL in games finished (57, 1995)
- His 321 career saves rank him 13th on the all-time list
- His 112 career saves ranks second all-time in Philadelphia Phillies history

== Controversies ==
Mesa was involved in a longstanding feud with former teammate Omar Vizquel following the publication of Vizquel's autobiography, Omar! My Life On and Off the Field. In the book, Vizquel criticized Mesa's performance in Game 7 of the 1997 World Series, in which Mesa came in with the Indians leading 2–1 and three outs away from their first championship in 49 years, only to blow the save and allow Florida to tie the game: "The eyes of the world were focused on every move we made. Unfortunately, Jose's own eyes were vacant. Completely empty. Nobody home. You could almost see right through him. Not long after I looked into his vacant eyes, he blew the save and the Marlins tied the game." Mesa reacted furiously, pledging to hit Vizquel upon every subsequent opportunity: "Even my little boy told me to get him. If I face him 10 more times, I'll hit him 10 times. I want to kill him."

By the end of the 2007 season, Mesa had hit Vizquel on three separate occasions. Vizquel expressed regret in 2014 about what happened due to his comments about Mesa (which he also stated were misinterpreted) but Mesa and Vizquel have never reconciled, to the point where Mesa said he hadn't spoken to Vizquel in over a decade and had no plans to ever talk to him again.

Mesa was charged with one count of rape for allegedly penetrating one woman with his finger and two counts of gross sexual imposition for allegedly groping two women in a Lakewood, Ohio motel room on December 22, 1996. Mesa was acquitted of all charges on April 9, 1997.

== Personal life ==
Mesa's son José Mesa Jr. is also a professional baseball pitcher.

== See also ==
- List of Major League Baseball annual saves leaders
