= Osmer Morales =

Venezuelan baseball player (born 1992)

Caciques de Distrito – No. 73
- Pitcher
- Born: October 30, 1992 (age 33); Villa de Cura, Venezuela
- Bats: Right Throws: Right

MLB debut
- August 16, 2018, for the Los Angeles Angels

MLB statistics (through 2018 season)
- Win–loss record: 0–0
- Earned run average: 0.00
- Strikeouts: 0
- Stats at Baseball Reference

Teams
- Los Angeles Angels (2018)

Osmer Eduardo Morales (born October 30, 1992) is a Venezuelan professional baseball pitcher for the Caciques de Distrito of the Venezuelan Major League. He has previously played in Major League Baseball (MLB) for the Los Angeles Angels.

== Career ==
=== Seattle Mariners ===
On May 1, 2010, Morales signed with the Seattle Mariners as an international free agent. He spent his first four professional seasons with the Venezuelan Summer League Mariners, making two scoreless appearances in each of his first two seasons in 2010 and 2011. Morales recorded a 2.08 ERA with 13 strikeouts in 10 games in 2012; in 2013 he logged a 5–1 record and 1.86 ERA with 66 strikeouts and five saves across 15 games.

Morales made 11 appearances (8 starts) for the rookie-level Arizona League Mariners in 2014, posting a 5–2 record and 2.20 ERA with 65 strikeouts over 49 innings of work. He spent the 2015 campaign with the Single-A Clinton LumberKings. In 43 appearances primarily out of the bullpen, Morales compiled a 1–8 record and 4.10 ERA with 85 strikeouts across 83 1/3 innings pitched.

In 2016, Morales made 32 appearances (14 starts) split between Single–A Clinton and the High–A Bakersfield Blaze, posting an aggregate 5–6 record and 3.32 ERA with 134 strikeouts across 116 2/3 innings pitched. He elected free agency following the season on November 7, 2016.

=== Los Angeles Angels ===
On November 14, 2016, Morales signed a minor league contract with the Los Angeles Angels. Morales spent the 2017 season with the Double-A Mobile BayBears and Triple-A Salt Lake Bees, posting a combined 6–5 record and 4.19 ERA with 121 strikeouts across 126 2/3 innings pitched. Morales was invited to spring training for the 2018 season, failed to make the team and was assigned to Salt Lake to begin the year.

On August 13, 2018, Morales was selected to the 40-man roster and promoted to the major leagues for the first time. He made his MLB debut on August 16, tossing 1/3 of an inning and allowing one hit against the Texas Rangers. Morales was designated for assignment by the Angels on September 3, following the acquisition of Luke Farrell. He cleared waivers and was sent outright to Triple-A Salt Lake on September 6. Morales elected free agency following the season on November 2.

On February 11, 2020, Morales signed with the Cleburne Railroaders of the American Association of Independent Professional Baseball. However, the team was not selected by the league to compete in the condensed 2020 season due to the COVID-19 pandemic. Morales was not chosen by another team in the dispersal draft, and therefore became a free agent.

=== Bravos de León ===
On March 10, 2021, Morales signed with the Bravos de León of the Mexican League. Morales recorded a 2–4 record and 7.24 ERA in 7 appearances before being released on June 27.

=== Algodoneros de Unión Laguna ===
On June 29, 2021, Morales signed with the Algodoneros de Unión Laguna of the Mexican League. In 6 starts, Morales went 1–3 with a 5.46 ERA and 25 strikeouts. He was released following the season on October 20.

=== Piratas de Campeche ===
On November 28, 2023, Morales signed with the Piratas de Campeche of the Mexican League. In 6 starts for Campeche, he struggled to a 9.93 ERA with 24 strikeouts across 22 2/3 innings of work. On May 21, 2024, Morales was released by the Piratas.

=== El Águila de Veracruz ===
On December 26, 2024, Morales signed with El Águila de Veracruz of the Mexican League. However, he was released prior to the start of the season on April 2, 2025.

=== Caciques de Distrito ===
In April 2025, Morales signed with the Caciques de Distrito of the Venezuelan Major League.
