= Gilberto Méndez =

Panamanian baseball player

- Pitcher
- Born: November 15, 1974 (age 51); Panama City, Panama
- Bats: Right Throws: Right
Medals
Men's baseball
Representing Panama
Baseball World Cup
Silver medal – second place	2003 Cuba	Team
Bronze medal – third place	2005 Netherlands	Team
Central American and Caribbean Games
Silver medal – second place	2002 San Salvador	Team
Bolivarian Games
Gold medal – first place	2001 Guayaquil	Team
Gold medal – first place	2009 Sucre	Team
Gold medal – first place	2009 Trujillo	Team
Central American Games
Silver medal – second place	2002 San Jose	Team

Gilberto Enrique Méndez Fernández (born November 15, 1974) is a Panamanian former baseball pitcher. In Panama's Fedebeis league, he holds the record for career wins (120) and innings pitched (1360.3), having played most of his career with Panamá Metro.

He played Panama's national team in the 2001 Baseball World Cup. In the 2002 Intercontinental Cup, he allowed five runs in 2 2/3 innings of work. He struck out six and allowed one run in four innings of work in the 2003 Baseball World Cup. In the 2005 Baseball World Cup, he allowed one run in three innings of work. In the 2007 Pan American Games, he allowed one run in two innings of work. During the 2007 Baseball World Cup, he allowed three walks and three runs in 2 1/3 innings of work, and in the 2008 Americas Baseball Cup he went 0–1 with a 4.91 ERA.

Hr appeared on Panama's roster in the 2009 World Baseball Classic but did not play. At the 2013 World Baseball Classic qualifiers, he pitched 2.0 innings, allowing three hits and one run.

In 2019, he was selected for Panama at the 2019 Pan American Games Qualifier.

Méndez previously served as the pitching coach for the Águilas Metropolitanas of the Panamanian Professional Baseball League for the 2023–24 season.
