= Marineros de Carabobo =

Logo	Cap insignia

Information
- League: Venezuelan Major League
- Location: Valencia, Venezuela
- Ballpark: Estadio José Bernardo Pérez
- Established: 2021; 5 years ago
- League championships: 1 (2023)
- Colors: Navy blue, crimson and white
- Manager: Clemente Álvarez

Current uniforms
Home	Away

The Marineros de Carabobo (English: Carabobo Mariners) are a Venezuelan professional baseball team competing in the Venezuelan Major League. Based in Valencia, the team represents the state of Carabobo and plays its home games at Estadio José Bernardo Pérez. Established in 2021 as one of the charter members of the Venezuelan Major League, the Marineros have won one league title in 2023.

== History ==
The Marineros were established in 2021 as one of the founding members of the Venezuelan Major League alongside the Senadores de Caracas, Líderes de Miranda, Lanceros de La Guaira, Samanes de Aragua and Guerreros de Caracas. The team were runners-up in the inaugural season, losing the championship series to the Senadores de Caracas, four games to two, led by Víctor Oramas, who won the Manager of the Year Award.

In 2022, the team finished first with 25 wins; however, they were swept in the semifinals by the Líderes de Miranda in three games.

In February 2023, Robert Pérez was presented as the team's new manager, replacing Víctor Oramas. That season, the Marineros won their first Venezuelan Major League championship, defeating the Delfines de La Guaira in five games in the final series; Marineros catcher Dennis Ortega was named Most Valuable Player of the finals. Yoel Yanqui won the batting title with a .395 batting average.

In March 2024, Pérez left the team to become the manager of the Caciques de Distrito and was replaced by Robinson Chirinos on 26 April 2024. The team finished the regular season in fourth position with a 23–19 record and lost in the semifinals to the Senadores de Caracas two games to three.

In May 2025, Clemente Álvarez was appointed as manager of the team ahead of the 2025 season. Yanqui again won the batting championship, recording a .438 batting average.

== Roster ==
Marineros de Carabobo roster
Players		Coaches
Pitchers: 50 (Venezuela) Ángel Acevedo; 47 (Venezuela) Henderson Álvarez; 18 (Venezuela) Carlos Aular; 25 (Venezuela) Carlos Betancourt; 21 (Venezuela) Eduardo Figueroa; 41 (Dominican Republic) Wander Guante; 30 (Venezuela) Yapson Gómez; 34 (Venezuela) Nelson Hernández; 95 (Venezuela) Luis Martínez; 29 (United States) José Mesa Jr.; 65 (Venezuela) Carlos Navas; 40 (Venezuela) Cruz Noriega; 61 (Venezuela) Brayan Pérez; 63 (Venezuela) Cristian Rueda; 27 (Dominican Republic) Eddy Reynoso; 45 (Venezuela) Manuel Rondón; 47 (Dominican Republic) Henry Sosa; 26 (Colombia) Víctor Vargas	Catchers: 17 (Venezuela) Ramón Cabrera; 23 (Venezuela) Adrián Crespo; 36 (Venezuela) Giovanny Rivero; Infielders: 3 (Venezuela) Bryant Flete; 8 (Venezuela) Johan López; -- (Venezuela) Ángel Morales; 20 (Venezuela) Franyer Noria; 39 (Venezuela) Carlos Santiago; 31 (Venezuela) José Tello; 33 (Cuba) Yoel Yanqui; Outfielders: 6 (Venezuela) Carlos Durán; 2 (Venezuela) Edgardo Fermín; 72 (Dominican Republic) Wagner Lagrange; 14 (Dominican Republic) Deivi Muñoz; -- (Venezuela) Nicoll Parra; 51 (Venezuela) Robert Pérez; 32 (Venezuela) Alexfri Planez; 9 (Venezuela) Danyer Sanabria	Manager: (Venezuela) Clemente Álvarez; Coaches: (Venezuela) Alex Cabrera (hitting); (Venezuela) Julio Figueroa (bullpen); (Venezuela) Ernesto León (third base); (Venezuela) Oswaldo Navarro (bench); (Venezuela) José Rojas (first base); (Venezuela) José Villa (pitching); Roster updated on 28 April 2026
