= Alberto Macré =

Panamanian baseball manager (born 1950)

- Infielder / Manager
- Born: March 25, 1950 (age 76); Puerto Armuelles, Panama
- Bats: Unknown Throws: Unknown
Medals
Men's baseball
Manager for Panama
Central American and Caribbean Games
Gold medal – first place	2026 Santo Domingo	Team
Coach for Panama
Baseball World Cup
Bronze medal – third place	2003 Havana	Team
Central American Games
Gold medal – first place	2010 Panama	Team

Alberto Macré Carrasco (born March 25, 1950) is a Panamanian baseball manager and former player. He has managed the Panama national baseball team as well as in Panama's Béisbol Mayor senior league. He is one of the winningest managers is dometic baseball, the only one to have led his teams to three championship titles in both Béisbol Mayor and at the country's youth level.

== Career ==
Macré was born and raised in Puerto Armuelles. In March 1978, He played third base with the Chiriquí provincial team that won its first championship in Béisbol Mayor. The team won a second championship in 1979.

As a manager, Macré achieved a three-peat when he led Chiriquí to the Béisbol Mayor title in 1991, 1992 and 1993. From 2014 to 2016, he managed Bocas del Toro, leading them to a long-awaited national championship in 2014. From 2018 to 2020, he managed the Chiriquí Occidente team.. He returned to manage Chiriquí in 2025. He brought the team to the Béisbol Mayor finals, where they lost to Bocas del Toro in seven games; he was replaced the following season by Carlos Lee III.

Macré has also won five titles in the Panaman's youth baseball: in 2005, 2007, 2008, 2009, and 2011, all with Chiriquí. He was named manager of the year in 2018 by the Panamanian Baseball Federation.
