= Álvaro Seijas =

Venezuelan baseball player (born 1998)

Caciques de Distrito – No. 27
- Pitcher
- Born: October 10, 1998 (age 27); Maracay, Venezuela
- Bats: Right Throws: Right
- Stats at Baseball Reference

Álvaro Daniel Seijas (born October 10, 1998) is a Venezuelan professional baseball pitcher for the Caciques de Distrito of the Venezuelan Major League. He signed with the St. Louis Cardinals as an international free agent in 2015.

== Career ==
=== St. Louis Cardinals ===
Seijas signed with the St. Louis Cardinals as an international free agent on July 2, 2015. He made his professional debut in 2016 with the Dominican Summer League Cardinals before being promoted to the Gulf Coast League Cardinals. Over 14 games (13 starts), he went 5–2 with a 3.38 ERA, striking out 55 over 69 1/3 innings. In 2017, he played with the rookie-level Johnson City Cardinals, going 4–3 with a 4.97 ERA over 12 starts, and in 2018, he pitched for the Single-A Peoria Chiefs, compiling a 5–8 record with a 4.52 ERA over 25 games (22 starts). Seijas began the 2019 season back with Peoria, with whom he was named a Midwest League All-Star, before being promoted to the High-A Palm Beach Cardinals in July. Over 24 starts with both clubs, he went 8–6 with a 2.81 ERA, compiling 114 strikeouts over 134 1/3 innings.

On November 20, 2019, the Cardinals added Seijas to their 40-man roster to protect him from the Rule 5 draft. He did not play in a game in 2020 due to the cancellation of the minor league season because of the COVID-19 pandemic. On August 21, 2020, Seijas was outrighted off of the 40-man roster. To begin the 2021 season, he was assigned to the Double-A Springfield Cardinals. After posting an 8.78 ERA in six games for Springfield, Seijas was released by the Cardinals on July 27, 2021.

=== Guerreros de Lara ===
In 2025, Seijas signed with the Guerreros de Lara of the Venezuelan Major League. In 9 games he threw 5.2 innings with a 12.71 ERA and 8 strikeouts.

=== Caciques de Distrito ===
On April 3, 2026, Seijas signed with the Caciques de Distrito of the Venezuelan Major League. In 19 games he threw 13.1 innings with a 1.35 ERA and 8 strikeouts.
