= Luis Vicente Mateo =

Cuban baseball player (born 1996)

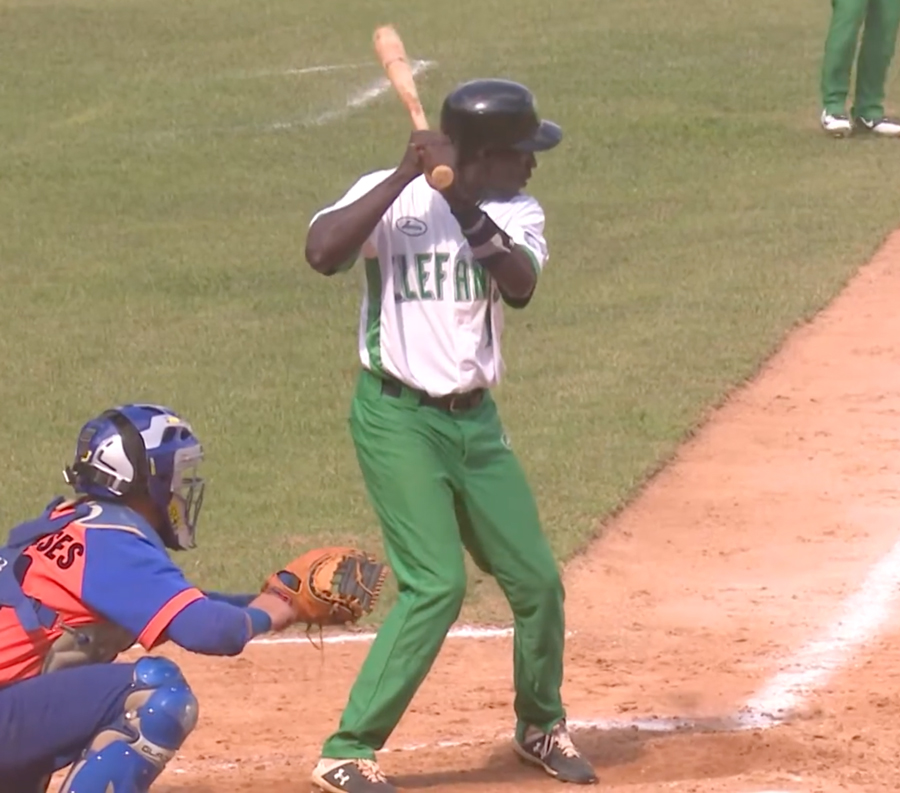
- Mateo with the Elefantes de Cienfuegos in 2021

Elefantes de Cienfuegos – No. 1
- Infielder
- Born: 19 January 1996 (age 30); Cruces, Cienfuegos Province, Cuba
- Bats: Right Throws: Right
Medals
Men's baseball
Representing Cuba
Central American and Caribbean Games
Silver medal – second place	2023 San Salvador	Team
Caribbean Baseball Cup
Silver medal – second place	2022 Nassau	Team

Luis Vicente Mateo Terry (born 19 January 1996) is a Cuban baseball infielder for the Elefantes de Cienfuegos. Mateo has represented Cuba at the 2023 World Baseball Classic, 2023 Central American and Caribbean Games, where he won the silver medal, and 2026 Central American and Caribbean Games.

== Early life ==
Mateo was born on 19 January 1996 in Cruces, Cienfuegos Province, Cuba. He began playing baseball at the age of eight, encouraged and supported by his father in his hometown of Cruces. Growing up, he admired Cuban baseball players Eduardo Paret and Germán Mesa.

== Career ==
Mateo debuted in the Cuban National Series during the 2014–15 season with the Elefantes de Cienfuegos. He appeared in 35 games, recording a .232/.313/.319 batting line with 16 hits and 11 RBIs. He has played for Cienfuegos throughout his career, but also played for Industriales as a reinforcement in 2020 and 2023, chosen by manager Rey Vicente Anglada.

== International career ==
Mateo debuted with the Cuba national baseball team at the 2022 Caribbean Baseball Cup, contested in Nassau, Bahamas, where Cuba won the silver medal. Mateo batted .333, recording six hits in 21 at-bats and six RBIs, while stealing three bases in five attempts.

In January 2023, he was selected to represent Cuba at the 2023 World Baseball Classic. He appeared in four games, recording three at-bats and one strikeout with a .000 batting average. Later that year, in June, he was part of the Cuban team that won the silver medal at the 2023 Central American and Caribbean Games in San Salvador.

In February 2026, Mateo represented Cuba at the 2026 Serie de las Américas, where the team finished third. He led the tournament in both batting average and hits, hitting .500, tied with Harold Ramírez for the highest average and recording a tournament-leading 10 hits. He was also named to the tournament's All-Star team.

He participated in the 2026 Central American and Caribbean Games, where Cuba lost the bronze medal to Puerto Rico. He led the tournament in batting average at .500, in hits with 12, and in home runs with two.
