= Miguel Mejía (politician) =

Dominican Republic politician

Miguel Mejía is a leftist Dominican politician and secretary general of the Izquierda Unida (Dominican Republic). In government, he was formerly a Minister without portfolio, then Minister for Regional Integration.

Mejía was closely associated with Venezuela's Hugo Chávez, and in the period following Chavez' death made several controversial press statements - including in one interview accusing the USA of plotting a coup- and declaring that Hugo Chávez never forgave Hipólito Mejía for having let the Dominican Republic become, in his view, involved in attempts to destabilize the Chavez government.
