= Cheslor Cuthbert =

Nicaraguan baseball player (born 1992)

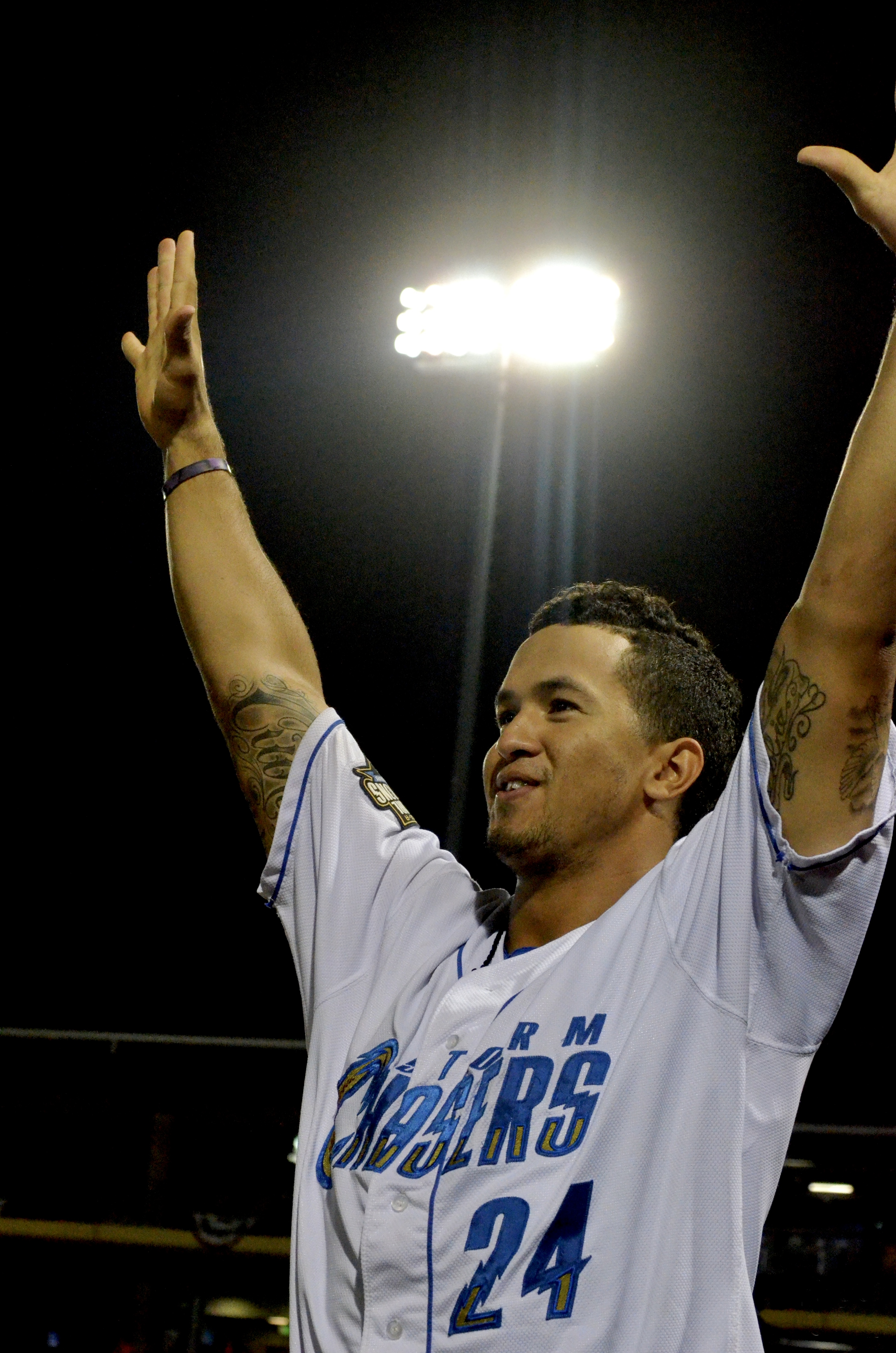
- Cuthbert with the Omaha Storm Chasers in 2015
- Third baseman
- Born: November 16, 1992 (age 33); Corn Islands, Nicaragua
- Batted: Right Threw: Right

MLB debut
- July 7, 2015, for the Kansas City Royals

Last MLB appearance
- July 26, 2020, for the Chicago White Sox

MLB statistics
- Batting average: .250
- Home run: 27
- Runs batted in: 119
- Stats at Baseball Reference

Teams
- Kansas City Royals (2015–2019); Chicago White Sox (2020)
Medals
Men's baseball
Representing Nicaragua
Central American and Caribbean Games
Silver medal – second place	2026 Santo Domingo	Team

Cheslor Jesly Cuthbert (/ˈtʃɛslɔːr ˈkʌθbərt/; born November 16, 1992) is a Nicaraguan former professional baseball third baseman. He played in Major League Baseball (MLB) for the Kansas City Royals and Chicago White Sox from 2015 to 2020.

== Early life ==
Cuthbert was born and raised on Corn Islands, Nicaragua, where his mother is from. His father is from the town of Pearl Lagoon, Nicaragua. Growing up he spoke an English Creole rather than Spanish and had to balance learning Spanish while training with the Nicaraguan National Baseball team.

== Professional career ==
=== Kansas City Royals ===
The Kansas City Royals signed Cuthbert as an international free agent in 2009, for a $1.35 million signing bonus. He made his professional debut in 2010. Prior to the 2012 season, Baseball America rated Cuthbert the 84th best prospect in baseball. After the 2012 season, he played for the Nicaraguan national baseball team in the 2013 World Baseball Classic Qualifying Tournament.

The Royals added Cuthbert to their 40-man roster on November 20, 2013. Cuthbert began the 2014 season with the Northwest Arkansas Naturals of the Double–A Texas League. When the Royals promoted third baseman Hunter Dozier to the Naturals, Cuthbert began playing first base and second base. He began the 2015 season with the Omaha Storm Chasers of the Triple–A Pacific Coast League, and represented the Royals at the 2015 All-Star Futures Game.

The Royals promoted Cuthbert to the major leagues on July 7, 2015, when Mike Moustakas was placed on family leave. Cuthbert got his first major league hit, a ground-ball single into left field the same day. Cuthbert was recalled from Triple–A Omaha on September 1, 2015. On September 2, Cuthbert hit his first major league home run, a two-run shot off Detroit's Guido Knudson.

Cuthbert was recalled from Triple–A Omaha on May 7, 2016 when Mike Moustakas was placed on the 15-day disabled list with a fractured finger. In 128 games, he hit .274 with 12 home runs and 46 RBIs.

In 58 games for the Royals in 2017, he hit .231 with 2 home runs and 18 RBI. He began the 2018 season as the Royals utility player but struggled through the season, hitting .194 in 30 games.

In 2019, Cuthbert played in 87 games for the Royals, he put up better numbers than he had done the previous two seasons combined, as he finished with 330 plate appearances, hitting .246 with 9 home runs and 40 RBI. On December 2, 2019, Cuthbert was non-tendered and became a free agent.

=== Chicago White Sox ===
On December 19, 2019, Cuthbert signed a minor league deal with the Chicago White Sox and was invited to spring training. Prior to the season, he was selected to the Nicaragua national baseball team roster at the 2021 World Baseball Classic Qualifier. He was designated for assignment on July 27, 2020.

=== Cincinnati Reds ===
On December 8, 2020, Cuthbert signed a minor league contract with the Cincinnati Reds organization, and was invited to spring training. In 21 games for the Triple-A Louisville Bats, Cuthbert slashed .203/.330/.338 before he was released on June 1, 2021.

=== New York Mets ===
On June 2, 2021, Cuthbert signed a minor league contract with the New York Mets organization. In 76 games for the Triple–A Syracuse Mets, he hit .228/.328/.461 with 14 home runs and 36 RBI. Cuthbert elected free agency following the season on November 7.

On January 11, 2022, Cuthbert signed with the Leones de Yucatán of the Mexican League. However, on April 13, Cuthbert requested special permission to return home to Nicaragua, and left the team.

=== Saimanes de Aragua ===
In May 2023, Cuthbert signed with the Saimanes de Aragua of the Venezuelan Major League.

== Personal life ==
Cuthbert has a son and a daughter. He lives in Corn Island during the offseason and has a chicken farm of over 150 roosters and 80 hens. Cuthbert's younger cousin, Rodney Theophile, pitched in the Washington Nationals organization.
