= Clemente Álvarez =

Venezuelan baseball player (born 1968)

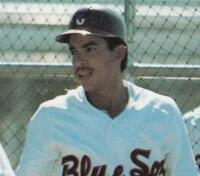
- Álvarez with the Utica Blue Sox c. 1988

Marineros de Carabobo
- Catcher / Manager
- Born: May 18, 1968 (age 58); Guanta, Anzoátegui, Venezuela
- Batted: Right Threw: Right

MLB debut
- September 19, 2000, for the Philadelphia Phillies

Last MLB appearance
- October 1, 2000, for the Philadelphia Phillies

MLB statistics
- Batting average: .200
- Runs: 1
- Hits: 1
- Stats at Baseball Reference

Teams
- Philadelphia Phillies (2000)

Clemente Rafael Álvarez (born May 18, 1968) is a Venezuelan former catcher in Major League Baseball who played for the Philadelphia Phillies in the 2000 MLB season. Listed at 5' 11", 180 lb., he batted and threw right handed. He is the manager of the Marineros de Carabobo of the Venezuelan Major League.

In two games as a backup, Álvarez went 1-for-5, for a .200 batting average, with one run scored.

== Career ==
He played winter ball with the Navegantes del Magallanes club of the Venezuelan Professional Baseball League, over the course of 19 seasons, spanning 1986–87 to 2003–04. He was regarded as the unofficial captain of the Magallanes squads of the 1990s. inducted into the Magallanes Hall of Fame in 2023

Following his playing career, Álvarez was appointed the interim manager of Magallanes during the 2007–08 season, after Alfredo Pedrique was fired. He also managed the Tigres de Aragua during the 2021–22 season, replacing Luis Ugueto, though he himself was fired during the closing stages of the season.

In May 2025, he was appointed as manager of the Marineros de Carabobo of the Venezuelan Major League.

== See also ==
- List of players from Venezuela in Major League Baseball
