= Caciques de Distrito =

- Logo

Information
- League: Venezuelan Major League
- Location: Caracas, Venezuela
- Ballpark: Estadio Universitario
- Established: 2022; 4 years ago
- Colors: Black, orange and white
- Manager: Alex Delgado

Current uniforms
Home	Away

The Caciques de Distrito (English: Distrito Chieftains) are a Venezuelan professional baseball team competing in the Venezuelan Major League. Based in Caracas, the team represents the Capital District and plays its home games at Estadio Universitario. Established in 2022, the Caciques have posted a losing record in each of their first three seasons.

== History ==
The Caciques were established in January 2022 and joined the Venezuelan Major League as an expansion team alongside the Relámpagos del Zulia. However, the Relámpagos did not make their debut due to administrative problems and were replaced by the Centauros de La Guaira.

The 2022 draft was held on 16 January, the Caciques selected fourteen players amongst them pitcher Edgmer Escalona. On 20 January, former Seattle Mariners infielder Luis Ugueto was announced as the team's manager. The Caciques finished their debut season in sixth place with a 20–22 record, unable to qualify for the playoffs.

In January 2023, Luis Sojo was appointed as manager of the Caciques. The team again finished sixth with a 19–21 record, missing out on the playoffs for the second consecutive season.

Robert Pérez, winner of the 2023 season with the Marineros de Carabobo, was appointed as manager of the Caciques ahead of the 2024 season. The team once again placed sixth in the 2024 season, ending with a 19–21 record and missing the playoffs.

== Roster ==
Caciques de Distrito roster
Players		Coaches
Pitchers: 42 (Venezuela) José Ascanio; 16 (Venezuela) Robert Colina; 31 (Venezuela) Gabriel Estrada; 53 (Venezuela) Henry Gómez; 47 (Dominican Republic) Maxwel Hernández; 18 (Venezuela) Eudis Idrogo; 41 (Venezuela) Keiner León; 2 (United States) Juan Mateo; 28 (Venezuela) Manuel Medina; 73 (Venezuela) Osmer Morales; 50 (Venezuela) Diego Moreno; 26 (Dominican Republic) Naswell Paulino; 48 (Dominican Republic) Luis Peña; 71 (Venezuela) Luis Rico; 12 (Venezuela) Ángel Román; 29 (Venezuela) Juan Romero; 40 (Venezuela) Jonney Rosario; 54 (Dominican Republic) Ramón Rosso; 27 (Venezuela) Álvaro Seijas; 59 (Venezuela) Shurland Smith; 79 (Venezuela) Carlos Suniaga	Catchers: 24 (Venezuela) Dennis Ortega; 22 (Venezuela) Israel Pineda; 36 (Venezuela) Keinner Piña; 61 (Venezuela) Luis Villegas; Infielders: 2 (Venezuela) Roger Cardona; 29 (Venezuela) Josmar Cordero; 11 (Venezuela) Carlos Franco; 7 (Venezuela) José Gómez; 43 (Venezuela) Miguel Hernández; 55 (Venezuela) Kevin Maitán; 39 (Venezuela) Renato Núñez; 30 (Venezuela) Gersel Pitre; 19 (Venezuela) Liván Soto; 11 (Venezuela) Kevin Vicuña; 12 (Venezuela) Engelb Vielma; Outfielders: 24 (Cuba) Geisel Cepeda; 10 (Venezuela) César Idrogo; 13 (Venezuela) Diego Infante; 51 (Venezuela) Miguel Laya; 4 (Venezuela) Gabriel Martínez	Manager: (Venezuela) Alex Delgado; Coaches: (Venezuela) Alexander Capriata (third base); (Venezuela) Guillermo Larreal (pitching); (Venezuela) Alex Romero (bench); (Venezuela) Rubén Salazar (first base); (Venezuela) Néstor Smith (hitting); (Venezuela) Jean Toledo (bullpen); Roster updated on 30 April, 2026
