= Darío Agrazal =

Panamanian baseball player (born 1994)

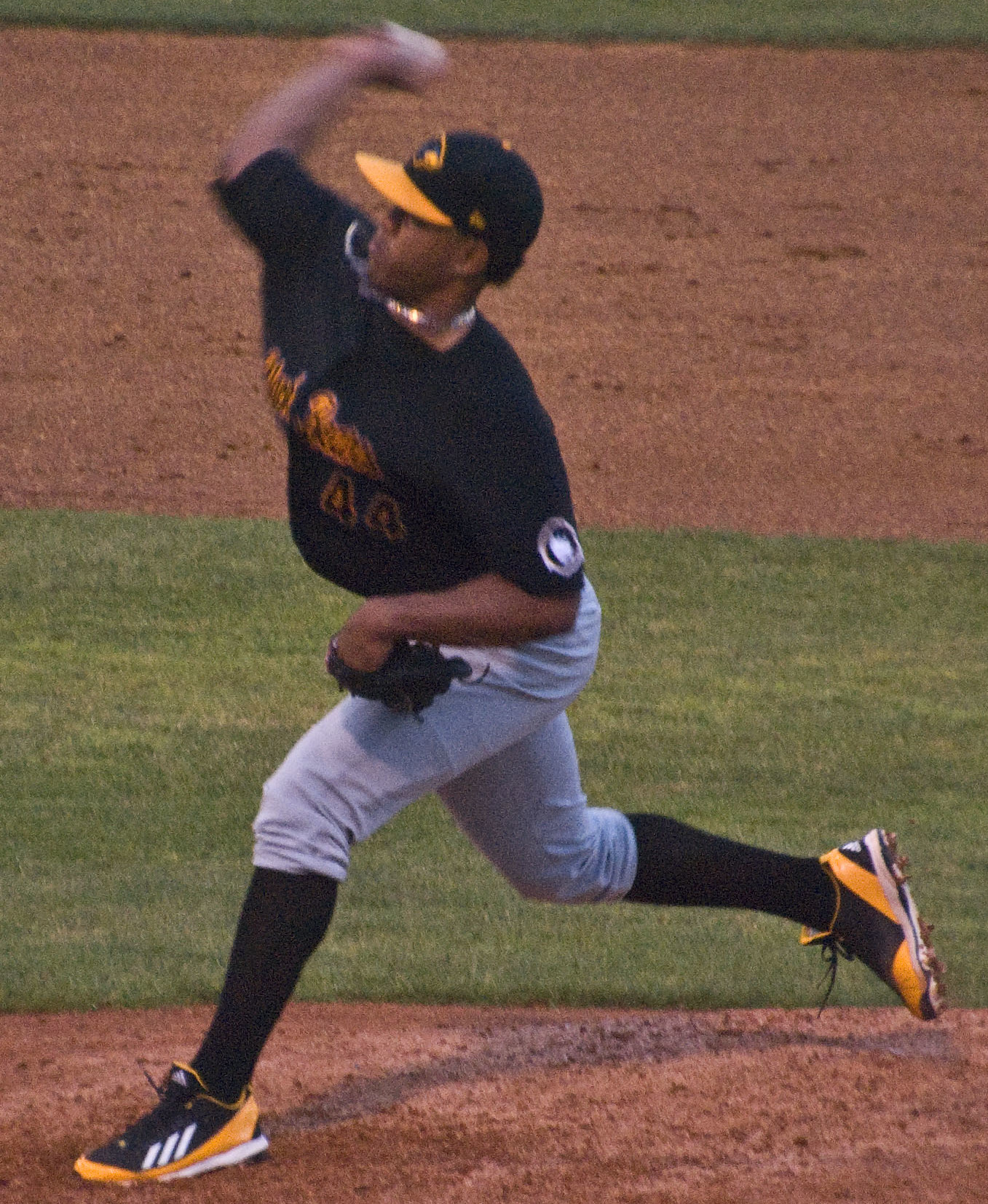
- Agrazal with the West Virginia Black Bears in 2015

Free agent
- Pitcher
- Born: December 28, 1994 (age 31); Aguadulce, Panama
- Bats: Right Throws: Right

MLB debut
- June 15, 2019, for the Pittsburgh Pirates

MLB statistics (through 2019 season)
- Win–loss record: 4–5
- Earned run average: 4.91
- Strikeouts: 41
- Stats at Baseball Reference

Teams
- Pittsburgh Pirates (2019)
Medals
Men's baseball
Representing Panama
Central American and Caribbean Games
Gold medal – first place	2026 Santo Domingo	Team

Darío Abdiel Agrazal Espinosa (born December 28, 1994) is a Panamanian professional baseball pitcher who is a free agent. He has previously played in Major League Baseball (MLB) for the Pittsburgh Pirates.

== Career ==
=== Pittsburgh Pirates ===
Agrazal signed with the Pittsburgh Pirates as an international free agent on July 1, 2012. He made his professional debut in 2013 with the Dominican Summer League Pirates and spent the whole season there, going 6–0 with a 2.40 ERA in 13 games (12 starts). In 2014, he played for the rookie-level Gulf Coast League Pirates where he was 3–4 with a 4.20 ERA in 12 starts, and in 2015, he pitched for the Low-A West Virginia Black Bears where he compiled a 6–5 record, 2.72 ERA, and 1.08 WHIP in 14 games started. Agrazal spent 2016 with the Single-A West Virginia Power where he was 8–12 with a 4.20 ERA in 27 starts and 2017 with the High-A Bradenton Marauders where he posted a 5–3 record and 2.91 ERA in 14 games (13 starts), along with pitching in one game for the Double-A Altoona Curve.

The Pirates added Agrazal to their 40-man roster after the 2017 season, in order to protect him from the Rule 5 draft. He began the 2018 season with Altoona and also spent time with Bradenton. In 17 games (16 starts) with the two teams, he went 5–6 with a 3.65 ERA.

Agrazal was designated for assignment on January 11, 2019, when Aaron Slegers was claimed off waivers. He began 2019 with Altoona before being promoted to the Indianapolis Indians. On June 15, Agrazal was promoted to the major leagues for the first time, and made his debut against the Miami Marlins. Agrazal was designated for assignment on November 20.

=== Detroit Tigers ===
On November 25, 2019, Agrazal was traded to the Detroit Tigers in exchange for cash considerations. Agrazal was designated for assignment on January 8, 2020, following the acquisition of Eric Haase. On January 13, Agrazal cleared waivers and was sent outright to the Triple-A Toledo Mud Hens. He was later invited to spring training which was cut short due to the COVID-19 pandemic.

Agrazal was assigned to the Tigers' alternate training site when the league resumed play in the summer. His contract was purchased on July 23, 2020, and Agrazal was slated to be a fifth starter. He was placed on the 10-day injured list on July 27 with right forearm strain. The Tigers transferred him to the 45-day injured list on August 19, ending his 2020 season before he could pitch in a single game. On October 27, Agrazal was outrighted off of the 40-man roster. He became a free agent on November 2.

=== Arizona Diamondbacks ===
On May 19, 2021, Agrazal signed a minor league contract with the Arizona Diamondbacks organization. He made only one appearance for the Double-A Amarillo Sod Poodles, in which he allowed three runs on four hits with one strikeout over one inning pitched. Agrazal elected free agency following the season on November 7.

=== Leones de Yucatán ===
On June 26, 2024, Agrazal signed with the Leones de Yucatán of the Mexican League. In 11 appearances for Yucatán, he struggled to a 7.59 ERA with 7 strikeouts across 10 2/3 innings pitched. Agrazal became a free agent following the season.

On June 8, 2025, Agrazal re-signed with Yucatán. In nine appearances (including eight starts) for the Leones, he posted a 3–4 record with a 5.54 ERA and 23 strikeouts over 39 innings pitched. Agrazal became a free agent following the season.

=== Algodoneros de Unión Laguna ===
On May 21, 2026, Agrazal signed with the Algodoneros de Unión Laguna of the Mexican League. In five starts for the team, he struggled to an 0–2 record with a 9.33 ERA, nine strikeouts, and eight walks across 18 1/3 innings pitched. On June 14, Agrazal was released by Laguna.
