= José Mesa Jr. =

Dominican-American baseball player (born 1993)

- Pitcher
- Born: August 13, 1993 (age 33); Miramar, Florida, U.S.
- Bats: Right Throws: Right

José Ramón Mesa Jr. (born August 13, 1993) is a Dominican-American former professional baseball pitcher.

== Career ==
Mesa attended Charles W. Flanagan High School in Pembroke Pines, Florida, beginning in his sophomore year, and played for the school's baseball team. He committed to attend Seminole State Community College.

=== New York Yankees ===
The New York Yankees selected Mesa in the 24th round of the 2012 MLB draft. His professional debut was delayed after he underwent Tommy John surgery, and he made his professional debut in 2014 with the Gulf Coast Yankees. In 2015, the Yankees assigned him to the Staten Island Yankees of the Low-A New York–Penn League. On the year, he worked to a 0.42 ERA in 10 appearances for the team, and also logged a 3.97 ERA in 5 games for the Single-A Charleston RiverDogs. In 2016, Mesa logged a 2.97 ERA in 14 games for Charleston, but struggled to an 11.57 ERA in 7 games after he was promoted to the High-A Tampa Yankees. The following season, Mesa split the year between Tampa and the Double-A Trenton Thunder, recording a stellar 1.93 ERA with 101 strikeouts in 84.0 innings of work across 29 total appearances.

On December 14, 2017, Mesa was selected by the Baltimore Orioles in the 2017 Rule 5 draft, and the Orioles had Mesa compete for a position in their starting rotation. The Orioles designated Mesa for assignment when they officially announced the signing of Alex Cobb on March 21, 2018. He returned to the Yankees on March 27. Mesa spent the entirety of 2018 season with Trenton, logging a 5.19 ERA in only 9 games. Mesa returned to Trenton in 2019, and only appeared in 7 games, struggling to a 7.71 ERA before he was released on June 24, 2019.

=== Kansas City Monarchs ===
On July 4, 2019, Mesa signed with the Kansas City Monarchs of the American Association of Professional Baseball. Mesa made 12 appearances for the team to close out the year, working to a 4.79 ERA with 63 strikeouts in 49.0 innings pitched. Mesa was released by the Monarchs on June 19, 2020, and did not play in professional baseball in the year. On March 9, 2021, Mesa re-signed with the Monarchs for the 2021 season.

=== Miami Marlins ===
On April 14, 2021, Mesa left the Monarchs without playing in a game and signed a minor league contract with the Miami Marlins organization. Mesa split the year between the Double-A Pensacola Blue Wahoos and Triple-A Jacksonville Jumbo Shrimp, but struggled to a 7.14 ERA with 26 strikeouts in 29.0 innings pitched. He elected free agency following the season on November 7.

=== Charleston Dirty Birds ===
On March 3, 2022, Mesa signed with the Charleston Dirty Birds of the Atlantic League of Professional Baseball. In 11 games (8 starts) for the Dirty Birds, he logged a 4–3 record and 5.14 ERA with 39 strikeouts across 42 innings pitched. Mesa was released by Charleston on August 18.

=== Guerreros de Oaxaca ===
On November 28, 2022, Mesa signed with the Guerreros de Oaxaca of the Mexican League. He made 4 starts, posting a 0–3 record with a 9.92 ERA and 8 strikeouts over 16 1/3 innings. He was released on May 12, 2023.

=== Rieleros de Aguascalientes ===
On December 20, 2023, Mesa signed with the Rieleros de Aguascalientes of the Mexican League. In 10 appearances for the Rieleros, he logged a 5.91 ERA with 11 strikeouts across 10 2/3 innings pitched. Mesa was released by Aguascalientes on May 7.

=== El Águila de Veracruz ===
On May 16, 2024, Mesa signed with El Águila de Veracruz of the Mexican League. In 13 appearances, he posted a 2–0 record with a 5.79 ERA and 9 strikeouts over 14 innings pitched. On July 5, Mesa was released by Veracruz.

== Personal life ==
Mesa's father, José Mesa, played in Major League Baseball. His older brother, Jesse, also played baseball at Flanagan.
