= Anthony García =

Puerto Rican baseball player (born 1992)

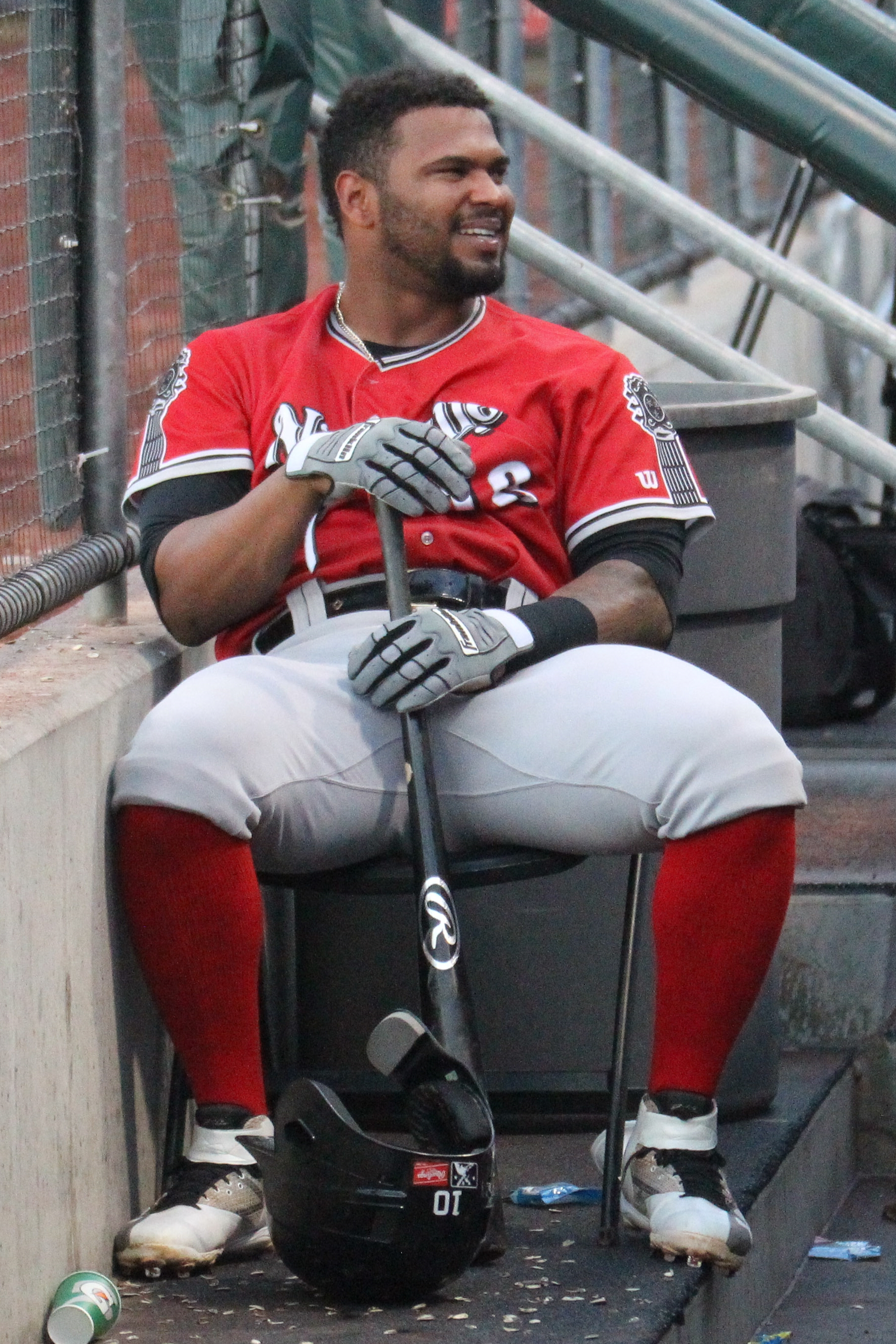
- Garcia with the Nashville Sounds

Long Island Ducks – No. 34
- Outfielder
- Born: January 4, 1992 (age 34); Carolina, Puerto Rico
- Bats: Right Throws: Right
- Stats at Baseball Reference
Medals
Men's baseball
Representing Puerto Rico
Central American and Caribbean Games
| Bronze medal – third place | 2026 Santo Domingo | Team |

Anthony García (born January 4, 1992) is a Puerto Rican professional baseball outfielder for the Long Island Ducks of the Atlantic League of Professional Baseball. He was drafted by the St. Louis Cardinals in the 18th round of the 2009 Major League Baseball draft.

== Career ==
=== St. Louis Cardinals ===
García made his professional debut in 2009 with the rookie-level Gulf Coast League Cardinals. He played for the Puerto Rico national baseball team at the 2015 Pan American Games. On November 5, 2015, the Cardinals added García to their 40-man roster to protect him from the Rule 5 draft. During the 2016 season, he split time between the Springfield Cardinals and the Memphis Redbirds. He posted a .238 batting average with 11 home runs and 43 RBIs between both clubs. In 2017, he once again split time between Springfield and Memphis, where he batted .282 with 16 home runs and 72 RBIs. On April 24, 2017, García was removed from the 40-man roster and sent outright to Triple–A Memphis. He elected free agency following the season on November 6.

=== Oakland Athletics ===
On November 28, 2017, García signed a minor league contract with the Oakland Athletics organization. In 132 games for the Triple–A Nashville Sounds, he hit .254/.357/.479 with 25 home runs and 91 RBI. García elected free agency following the season on November 2.

=== San Francisco Giants ===
On November 29, 2018, Garcia signed a minor league contract with the San Francisco Giants organization. He did not make the team and was assigned to the Triple–A Sacramento River Cats to start the season. In 55 games for Sacramento, García slashed .284/.371/.426 with six home runs and 25 RBI. He elected free agency following the season on November 4, 2019.

=== Los Angeles Dodgers ===
On December 19, 2019, García signed a minor league deal with the Los Angeles Dodgers. On July 11, 2020, he was added to the Dodgers' 60-man player pool. García did not play in a game in 2020 due to the cancellation of the minor league season because of the COVID-19 pandemic. He became a free agent on November 2.

=== Kane County Cougars ===
On March 19, 2021, García signed with the Kane County Cougars of the American Association of Professional Baseball. However, he left the Cougars on April 23 without having played a game for them.

=== Mariachis de Guadalajara ===
On April 23, 2021, García signed with the Mariachis de Guadalajara of the Mexican League. He appeared in 36 games for the Mariachis, hitting .316/.428/.623 with 9 home runs, 26 RBI, and four stolen bases. In 2022, García played in 47 games for Guadalajara, slashing .346/.467/.642 with 13 home runs, 43 RBI, and 6 stolen bases. On June 16, 2022, he suffered an ankle injury during a game against the Algodoneros de Unión Laguna and was later ruled out for the rest of the season. He was released on June 21. On February 17, 2023, García re-signed with Guadalajara for the 2023 season. In 23 games, he slashed .279/.387/.468 with 3 home runs and 12 RBIs. García was released on May 19, 2023.

=== Saraperos de Saltillo ===
On June 15, 2023, García signed with the Saraperos de Saltillo of the Mexican League. In 11 appearances for Saltillo, he batted .325/.481/.500 with two home runs and 13 RBI.

=== Leones de Yucatán ===
On July 3, 2023, García's rights were traded to the Leones de Yucatán. In 30 games, he hit .298/.407/.535 with seven home runs, 29 RBI and three stolen bases.

=== Charros de Jalisco ===
On November 30, 2023, García's rights were traded to the Charros de Jalisco in exchange for Odrisamer Despaigne. In 30 games for Jalisco in 2024, García batted .307/.403/.594 with six home runs, 18 RBI, and four stolen bases.

=== Pericos de Puebla ===
On May 30, 2024, García was traded to the Pericos de Puebla of the Mexican League in exchange for Elkin Alcalá. In 25 games for Puebla, he hit .308/.439/.577 with six home runs and 15 RBI. García was released by the Pericos on July 3.

=== Rieleros de Aguascalientes ===
On July 4, 2024, García was claimed off waivers by the Rieleros de Aguascalientes of the Mexican League. In 21 games for Aguascalientes, he slashed .312/.342/.481 with three home runs and 12 RBI. García was released by the Rieleros on October 23.

=== Tigres de Quintana Roo ===
On May 5, 2025, García signed with the Tigres de Quintana Roo of the Mexican League. In 19 appearances for Quintana Roo, he batted .263/.309/.382 with two home runs and 15 RBI. García was released by the Tigres on June 1.

On January 6, 2026, García signed with the Saraperos de Saltillo of the Mexican League. However, he failed to make the Opening Day roster and was released prior to the start of the season on April 14.

=== Long Island Ducks ===
On May 12, 2026, García signed with the Long Island Ducks of the Atlantic League of Professional Baseball.
