= Panamanian Baseball Federation =

Governing body of baseball in Panama

- Sport: Baseball
- Jurisdiction: Panama
- Abbreviation: FEDEBEIS
- Founded: 1944
- Affiliation: WBSC
- Regional affiliation: WBSC Americas
- Headquarters: Panama City
- President: Benicio Robinson

Official website
- fedebeis.com.pa
- (Panama)

The Panamanian Baseball Federation (Spanish: Federación Panameña de Béisbol), known as FEDEBEIS, is the official governing body of baseball in Panama. It is in charge of the Panama national baseball team.

FEDEBEIS also organizes amateur baseball championships in the country, including the Campeonato Nacional de Béisbol Mayor (lit. National Senior Baseball Championship), which includes teams from all of the country's 12 provinces. The Campeonato de Béisbol Mayor coexists with the Panamanian Professional Baseball League (PROBEIS) as one of two major baseball leagues in the country, and rivals PROBEIS in terms of attendance and popularity. Certain provincial teams, such as Panamá Metro, have participated in both leagues.

== History ==
The first senior league championship was held at Panama's Olympic Stadium (the modern Estadio Juan Demóstenes Arosemena), with Panamá Province taking the inaugural championship; Panamá would become the most dominant team in the tournament, accumulating 26 championships through 2026. Starting in 1978, Chiriquí emerged as a force in the league, with legendary figures like Virgilio Kaa, Oscar Osorio, and Rodolfo “Candelilla” Aparicio, among others. Another intense rivalry emerged as the Clásico de Azuero, between Herrera and Los Santos.

== Béisbol Mayor champions ==
Panamá Province was divided into Panamá Metro and Panamá Oeste in 1975, with Panamá Metro retaining the previous team's titles. The provincial teams of Darién, Panamá Oeste y Chiriquí Occidente are the only ones that have never won a championship as of 2024.

Province	Wins	Seasons
Panamá Metro	26	1944, 1946, 1947, 1948, 1950, 1951, 1952, 1954, 1955, 1960, 1963, 1964, 1968, 1969, 1970, 1971, 1973, 1975, 1981, 1983, 1994, 2001, 2010, 2016, 2019, 2022
Chiriquí	17	1978, 1979, 1991, 1992, 1993, 1996, 1998, 1999, 2000, 2002, 2004, 2013, 2015, 2018, 2020, 2021, 2024
Herrera	16	1945, 1965, 1966, 1967, 1977, 1980, 1982, 1985, 1986, 1988, 1989, 1997, 2003, 2005, 2006, 2007
Colón	9	1949, 1953, 1956, 1957, 1958, 1959, 1962, 2017, 2023
Los Santos	7	1972, 1974, 1976, 1995, 2008, 2009, 2011
Bocas del Toro	5	1961, 2012, 2014, 2025, 2026
Coclé	1	1987
Veraguas	1	1984

== Senior league statistical leaders ==
=== Career leaders ===
Batting leaders
Stat	Player	Years	Total	Team(s)
AVG	(Panama) José Solís	15 seasons	.391	Los Santos
HR	(Panama) Manuel Rodríguez	19 seasons	140	Herrera
RBI	(Panama) Virgilio Kaa	—N/a	522	Chiriquí
R	(Panama) Rodolfo Aparicio	17 seasons 1992–2009	594	Chiriquí
H	(Panama) Rodolfo Aparicio	17 seasons 1992–2009	831	Chiriquí

Pitching leaders
Stat	Player	Years	Total	Team(s)
W	(Panama) Gilberto Mendez	—N/a	120	Panamá Metro, Coclé, Los Santos
SV	(Panama) Euclides Bethancourt	17 seasons 2022–2005	53	Panamá Oeste, Bocas del Toro
G	(Panama) Bienvenido Cedeño	17 seasons 2022–2005	53	Panamá Oeste, Chiriquí, Bocas del Toro
IP	(Panama) Gilberto Mendez	—N/a	1360.3	Panamá Metro, Coclé, Los Santos
K	(Panama) Roberto Hernández	22 seasons 1984–2006	1029	Los Santos
