= Miguel Mejía (pitcher) =

American baseball player (born 1988)

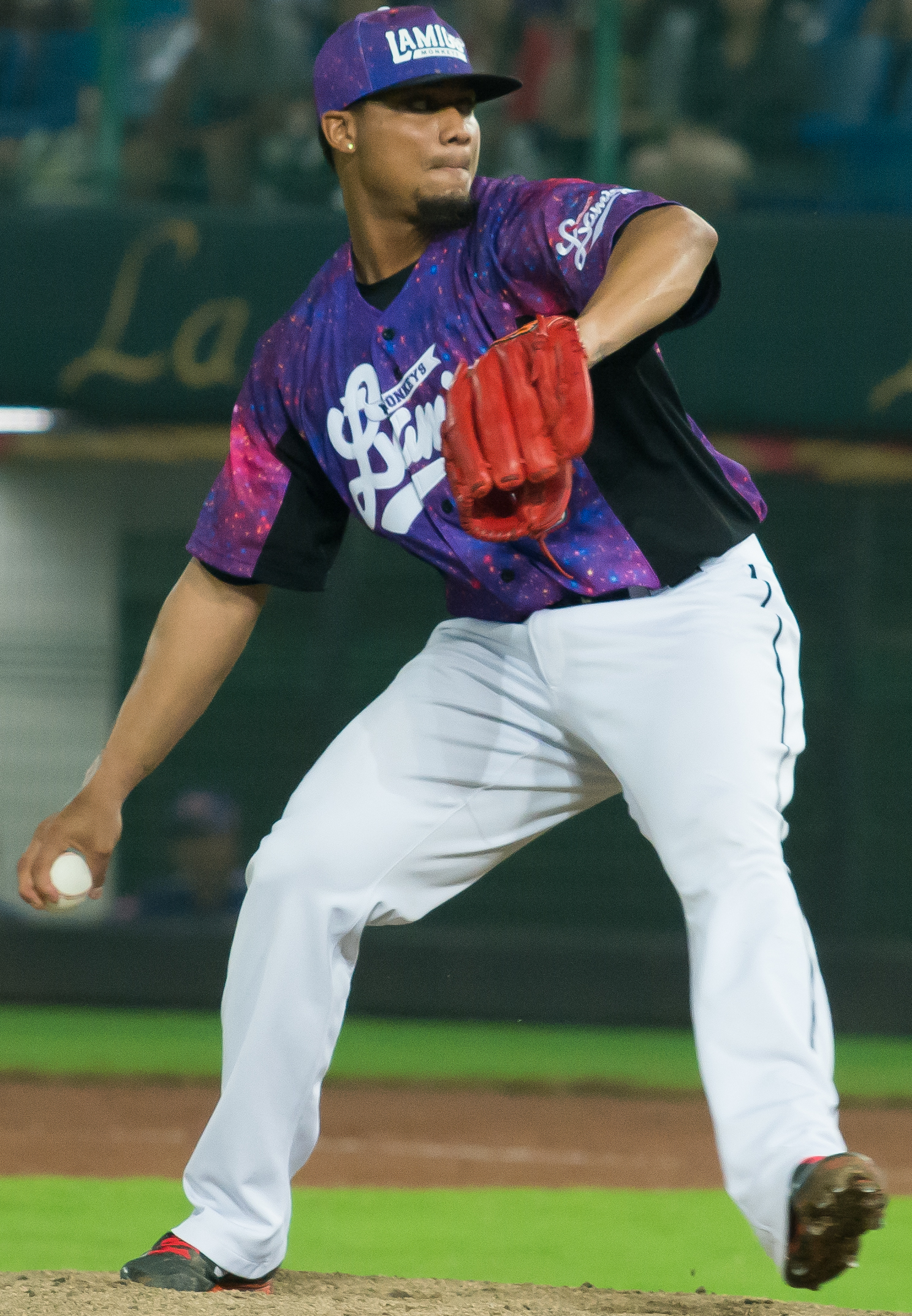
- Image of Miguel Mejía
- Pitcher
- Born: January 19, 1988 (age 38); Brooklyn, New York, U.S.
- Batted: Right Threw: Right

Professional debut
- CPBL: April 16, 2013, for the Brother Elephants
- NPB: May 21, 2015, for the Saitama Seibu Lions

Last appearance
- CPBL: September 30, 2014, for the Lamigo Monkeys
- NPB: July 24, 2015, for the Saitama Seibu Lions

CPBL statistics
- Win–loss record: 10–10
- Earned run average: 2.55
- Strikeouts: 123
- Saves: 35

NPB statistics
- Win–loss record: 0–0
- Earned run average: 14.73
- Strikeouts: 4
- Stats at Baseball Reference

Teams
- Brother Elephants (2013); Lamigo Monkeys (2014); Saitama Seibu Lions (2015)
Medals
Men's baseball
Representing Puerto Rico
World Baseball Classic
Silver medal – second place	2017 Los Angeles	Team
Central American and Caribbean Games
Bronze medal – third place	2026 Santo Domingo	Team
Caribbean Cup
Bronze medal – third place	2023 Puerto Rico	Team

Miguel Mejía (born January 19, 1988) is a Puerto Rican professional baseball pitcher. He played in the Chinese Professional Baseball League (CPBL) for the Brother Elephants and Lamigo Monkeys, and in Nippon Professional Baseball (NPB) for the Saitama Seibu Lions.

== Career ==
=== Detroit Tigers ===
On August 20, 2009, Mejía signed with the Detroit Tigers as an undrafted free agent after he was not selected in the 2009 Major League Baseball draft. He split his first professional season between the rookie–level Gulf Coast League Tigers and High–A Lakeland Flying Tigers, posting a 3.18 ERA in 3 total appearances.

Mejía split the 2010 campaign between the Low–A Connecticut Tigers, Single–A West Michigan Whitecaps and Lakeland. In 35 games for the three affiliates, he compiled a 6–3 record and 2.80 ERA with 66 strikeouts and 5 saves across 70 2/3 innings of work. Mejía was released by the Tigers organization on March 21, 2011.

=== Bridgeport Bluefish ===
Mejía subsequently signed with the Bridgeport Bluefish of the Atlantic League of Professional Baseball. In 13 games (4 starts) for the club, he struggled to a 7.88 ERA with 17 strikeouts over 32 innings pitched. Mejía was released by the Bluefish on June 30, 2011, after stating that he was "too tired" to pitch.

=== Miami Marlins ===
On July 6, 2011, Mejía signed a minor league contract with the Miami Marlins organization. In 15 games split between the Low–A Jamestown Jammers and Single–A Greensboro Grasshoppers, he registered a 3–3 record and 3.18 ERA with 26 strikeouts over 22 2/3 innings pitched. Mejía elected free agency following the season on November 2.

=== Brother Elephants ===
Mejía signed with the Brother Elephants of the Chinese Professional Baseball League for the 2013 campaign. He was promoted to the active roster after Mike Ballard was released on April 12, 2013. In 21 games (18 starts) for the Elephants, Mejía compiled a 5–9 record and 3.26 ERA with 77 strikeouts across 107 2/3 innings pitched.

=== Lamigo Monkeys ===
Mejía signed with the Lamigo Monkeys of the Chinese Professional Baseball League for the 2014 season. With the team, he set a CPBL record with 26 consecutive scoreless appearances. In 55 appearances out of the bullpen for the Monkeys, Mejía compiled a 5–1 record and 1.24 ERA with 46 strikeouts across 58 innings pitched. His 35 saves on the season were also a CPBL record. Following the season, Mejía was named the league's Closer of the Year.

=== Saitama Seibu Lions ===
On November 13, 2014, Mejía signed with the Saitama Seibu Lions of Nippon Professional Baseball. In four appearances for Seibu in 2015, he struggled to a 14.73 ERA with 4 strikeouts across 3 2/3 innings.

=== Chicago Cubs ===
On December 21, 2015, Mejía signed a minor league contract with the Chicago Cubs organization. He made 25 appearances split between the Double–A Tennessee Smokies and Triple–A Iowa Cubs, accumulating a 1.38 ERA with 18 strikeouts across 26 innings pitched. Mejía elected free agency following the season on November 7, 2016.

=== Diablos Rojos del México ===
On November 17, 2017, Mejía signed with the Diablos Rojos del México of the Mexican League. In 23 appearances for México, he posted a 4.70 ERA with 18 strikeouts and 2 saves over 23 innings. Mejía was released on July 2, 2018.

=== Piratas de Campeche ===
On June 20, 2019, Mejía signed with the Piratas de Campeche of the Mexican League. In 26 appearances out of the bullpen, he registered a 4.68 ERA with 21 strikeouts and 8 saves across 25 innings of work. Mejía was released by Campeche on January 10, 2020.
