= Yoel Yanqui =

Cuban baseball player (born 1996)

Marineros de Carabobo – No. 33
- Infielder / Outfielder
- Born: 25 April 1996 (age 30); Palma Soriano, Santiago de Cuba, Cuba
- Bats: Left Throws: Left

Yoel Yanqui Vera (born 25 April 1996) is a Cuban professional baseball infielder for the Marineros de Carabobo of the Venezuelan Major League. After playing a couple of seasons in Cuba, Yanqui signed with the Arizona Diamondbacks organization, where he played in their minor league system from 2017 to 2019. He has also played in the Dominican Republic, Venezuela and Nicaragua.

== Career ==
=== Santiago de Cuba ===
Yanqui made his debut in the Cuban National Series during the 2013–14 season with the Avispas de Santiago de Cuba. He appeared in 17 games with the Avispas, hitting .056/.150/.056. The next season, he appeared in 35 games, batting .241/.290/.293 with 16 runs, 28 hits and 6 RBIs. After two seasons playing in Cuba, Yanqui left the island.

=== Arizona Diamondbacks ===
On 14 June 2017, Yanqui signed with the Arizona Diamondbacks organization and was assigned to the Dominican Summer League Diamondbacks, where he appeared in 50 games, slashing .373/.460/.544 with 31 runs, 63 hits and 28 RBIs. The next season, he was promoted to the Kane County Cougars of the Single-A Midwest League, where he appeared in 126 games, batting .289/.356/.380 with 83 runs, 143 hits, and 60 RBI.

In 2019, Yanqui split the season between the Visalia Rawhide of the High-A California League and a brief stint with the Arizona League Diamondbacks. With Visalia, he appeared in 84 games, batting .272/.358/.442 with 38 runs scored, 80 hits, and 47 RBI. He also made four appearances with the AZL Diamondbacks, where he recorded a .231/.286/.308 line.

=== Cincinnati Reds ===
On 10 December 2020, Yanqui signed a minor league contract with the Cincinnati Reds. He spent the 2021 season playing for the Chattanooga Lookouts of the Double-A Southern League. Yanqui appeared in 80 games for Chattanooga, recording 37 hits, 64 runs, 35 RBI, and a .235/.323/.368 batting line. He was released by the Reds organization on 21 August 2021.

=== Marineros de Carabobo ===
In 2023, Yanqui signed with the Marineros de Carabobo of the Venezuelan Major League, where he won the league batting title with a .395 average. He was re-signed for the 2024 season and again for the 2025 season. In 2025, Yanqui again won the league's batting title, this time recording a .438 batting average.

=== Guerreros de Oaxaca ===
On 6 February 2026, Yanqui signed with the Guerreros de Oaxaca of the Mexican League. He did not appear in a single game for Oaxaca.

=== Marineros de Carabobo (second stint) ===
On 12 April 2026, Yanqui re-signed with the Marineros de Carabobo of the Venezuelan Major League.

=== Winter baseball ===
Yanqui has also played winter league baseball in the Dominican Professional Baseball League for the Leones del Escogido and Tigres del Licey; in the Venezuelan Professional Baseball League for the Navegantes del Magallanes and Cardenales de Lara; and in the Nicaraguan Professional Baseball League for the Indios del Bóer.

== International career ==
Yanqui was selected to represent Cuba at the 2026 Serie de las Américas and the 2026 World Baseball Classic.
