= La Sabana, Venezuela =

Village in northern Venezuela

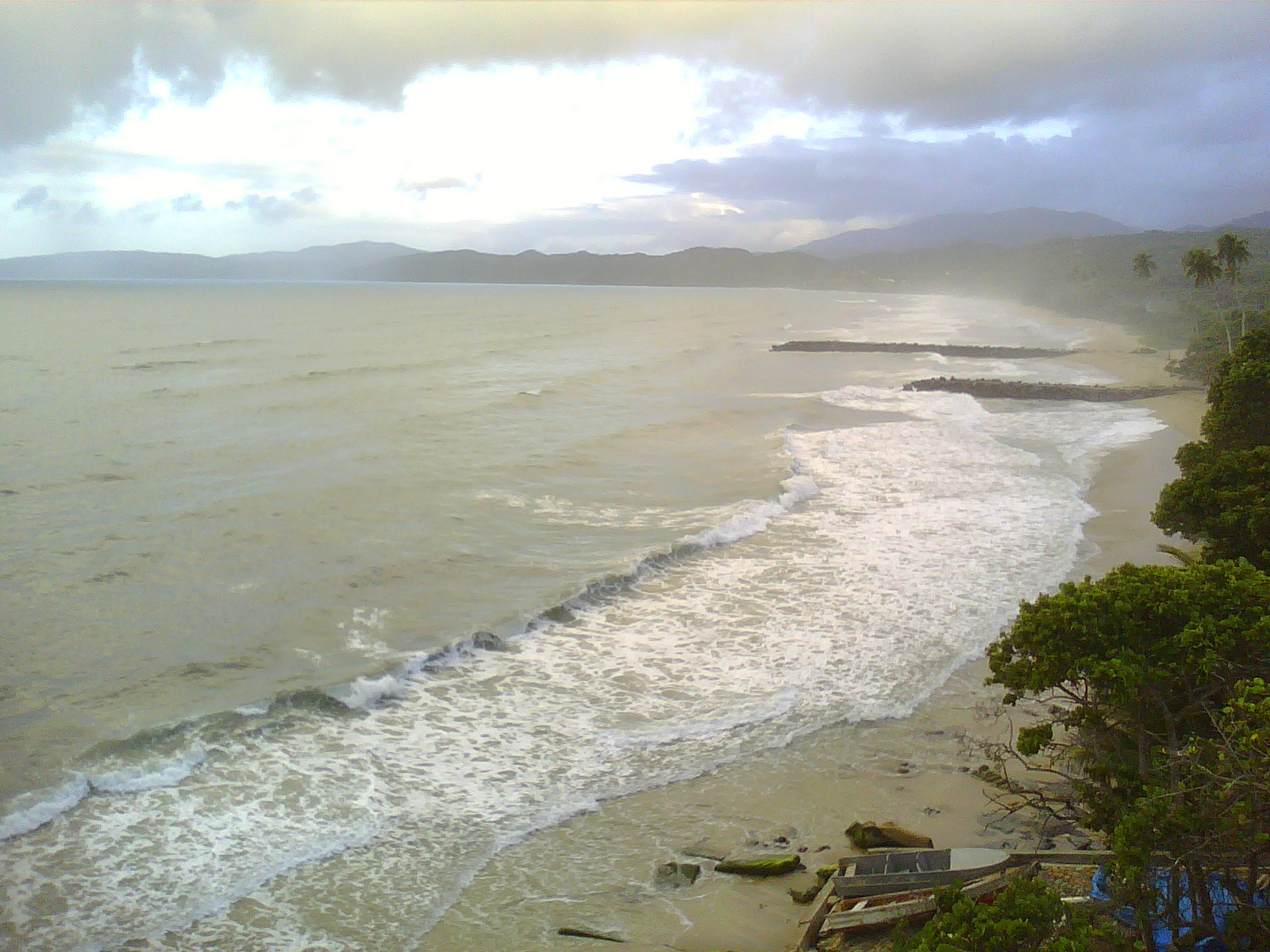

- Location within Venezuela
- Coordinates: 10°37′05″N 66°22′56″W
- Country: Venezuela
- State: La Guaira
- Municipality: Vargas

Population (2026)
  - Total: ~3,000
- Time zone: UTC−4 (VET)

La Sabana is a small fishing town in Vargas Municipality along the north central coast of Venezuela. It is one of seven villages in Caruao Parish, northeast of Caracas. La Sabana is known for having produced several dozen professional baseball players, including players in Major League Baseball in the United States. It has a population of approximately 3,000, and has one baseball field, Oscar Santiago Escobar Stadium, in a part of town called Santa Cruz. The local agricultural crop is plantains.

La Sabana is the hometown of Ronald Acuña Jr., an outfielder for the Atlanta Braves. Other baseball players from La Sabana include the former MLB shortstop Alcides Escobar, Chicago White Sox shortstop Luisangel Acuña, and Kansas City Royals infielder Maikel García.

== History ==
Spanish conquistador Francisco Fajardo was active in the valley of Panecillo near La Sabana in the mid-16th century. He clashed with local indigenous leaders such as Guaimacuare and Paisana, who opposed Spanish colonization.

In the 16th century, the central coast of Venezuela played an important role in maritime trade as well as attacks at sea. A pile of cannons made of bronze and iron was found by a fisherman in La Sabana in 2007. The shipwreck is at the beach in La Sabana, 60 kilometres (37 mi) to the east of the port of La Guaira. Five of the guns discovered originated from Portugal, Belgium, and Germany, with the earliest one dating back to 1553.

By the early 17th century, there was a group of haciendas in the La Sabana area. During the 18th century, La Sabana was one of the settlements in Venezuela, like Curiepe, with a population of "free blacks" – descendants of Africans who had been brought to the Caribbean as slaves who lived in freedom.

== Baseball heritage ==
There have been at least 50 to 60 baseball players from La Sabana who signed professional contracts, including eight Major League Baseball (MLB) players. They have come from five local interrelated families spanning three generations of players. The first MLB player was José Escobar, who spent 13 seasons in the minor leagues before joining the Cleveland Indians (now known as the Guardians). His two nephews, Kelvim Escobar and Alcides Escobar, were next. Kelvim debuted with the Toronto Blue Jays in 1997, and Alcides won the World Series with the Kansas City Royals in 2015. Jose's son, pitcher Edwin Escobar, debuted with the Boston Red Sox in 2014.

In 2024, Luisangel Acuña and Ronald Acuña Jr. of La Sabana became the tenth pair of Venezuelan brothers to play professionally in MLB. At the time, Luisangel had joined the New York Mets, while Ronald had already established himself as the Most Valuable Player (MVP) of the National League playing for the Atlanta Braves. Their father, Ronald Sr., had spent eight seasons in the minor leagues. Throughout his career, Ronald Acuña Jr. has been vocal about his love for his hometown. In 2023, he shouted "La Sabana! La Sabana!" as he completed his 40th home run of the season, setting an MLB record in combination with the 68 bases he had stolen up to that point. In 2018, he had the words "EL DE LA SABANA" engraved on his bat during the second annual MLB Players Weekend. In 2019, he had his Players Weekend jersey emblazoned with the nickname EL DE LA SABANA.

== Notable people ==
- Luisangel Acuña (born 2002) professional baseball player for the Chicago White Sox in MLB
- Ronald Acuña Jr. (born 1997) professional baseball player for the Atlanta Braves in MLB
- Alcides Escobar (born 1986), former MLB player
- Ángel Escobar (born 1965), former MLB player
- Edwin Escobar (born 1992), former MLB player
- Jose Escobar (born 1960), former MLB player
- Kelvim Escobar (born 1976), former MLB player
- Maikel García (born 2000), professional baseball player for the Kansas City Royals in MLB
