= Edwin Escobar =

Venezuelan baseball player (born 1992)

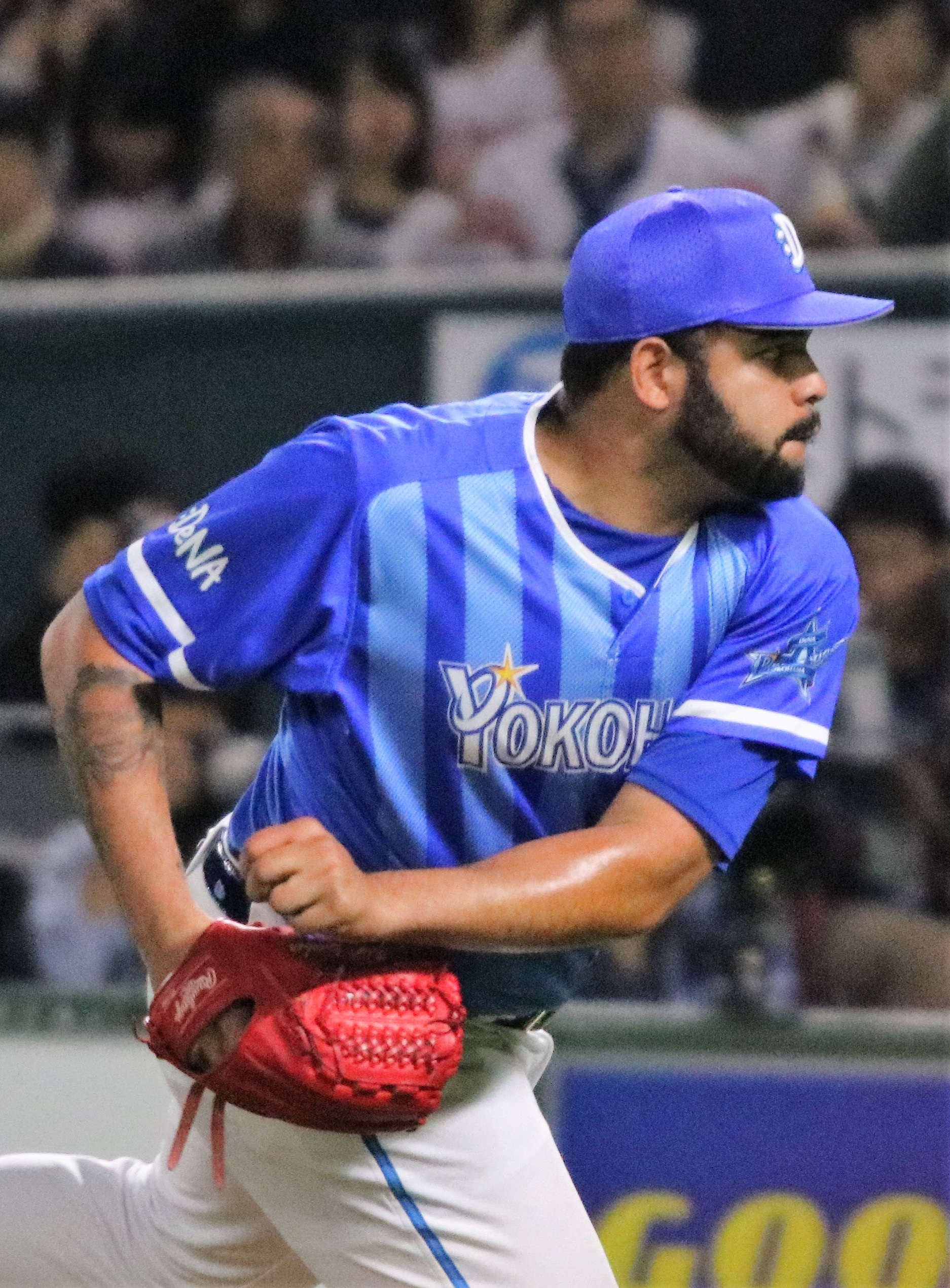
- Escobar with the Yokohama DeNA BayStars

Free agent
- Pitcher
- Born: April 22, 1992 (age 34); La Sabana, Venezuela
- Bats: Left Throws: Left

Professional debut
- MLB: August 27, 2014, for the Boston Red Sox
- NPB: April 2, 2017, for the Hokkaido Nippon-Ham Fighters

MLB statistics (through 2016 season)
- Win–loss record: 1–2
- Earned run average: 7.01
- Strikeouts: 19

NPB statistics (through 2023 season)
- Win–loss record: 22–23
- Earned run average: 3.17
- Strikeouts: 383
- Saves: 5
- Holds: 147
- Stats at Baseball Reference

Teams
- Boston Red Sox (2014); Arizona Diamondbacks (2016); Hokkaido Nippon-Ham Fighters (2017); Yokohama DeNA BayStars (2017–2023)

Edwin José Escobar (born April 22, 1992) is a Venezuelan professional baseball pitcher who is a free agent. He has previously played in Major League Baseball (MLB) for the Boston Red Sox and Arizona Diamondbacks, and in Nippon Professional Baseball (NPB) for the Hokkaido Nippon-Ham Fighters and Yokohama DeNA BayStars.

== Career ==
=== Texas Rangers ===
The Texas Rangers signed Escobar as an international free agent in 2008. He made his professional debut with the rookie-level Arizona League Rangers in 2009, logging a 2–5 record and 5.00 ERA with 48 strikeouts in 13 games.

=== San Francisco Giants ===
On April 1, 2010, Escobar was traded to the San Francisco Giants in exchange for minor leaguer Ben Snyder. He spent the season with the Low-A Salem-Keizer Volcanoes, pitching to a 2–4 record, a 4.86 ERA, and 69 strikeouts in 14 games. The next year, Escobar split the season between the rookie-level Arizona League Giants and the Single-A Augusta GreenJackets, accumulating a 3–7 record and 6.58 ERA with 47 strikeouts in 52 innings of work. In 2012, he returned to Augusta, pitching to a 7–8 record and 2.96 ERA with 122 strikeouts in 130 2/3 innings pitched.

The Giants added Escobar to their 40-man roster after the 2012 season, in order to protect him from the Rule 5 draft. He split the 2013 season between the High-A San Jose Giants and the Double-A Richmond Flying Squirrels, posting a 8–8 record and 2.80 ERA with 146 strikeouts in 26 games (24 starts) split between the two affiliates. He began the 2014 season with the Triple-A Fresno Grizzlies, and logged a 3–8 record and 5.11 ERA with 96 strikeouts in 20 games.

=== Boston Red Sox ===
The Giants traded Escobar and Heath Hembree to the Boston Red Sox in exchange for Jake Peavy on July 26, 2014. He was called up to the Red Sox on August 10, and returned to the Triple-A Pawtucket Red Sox the next day. Escobar was recalled on August 27, and pitched a scoreless 8th inning in his Major League debut in Toronto against the Toronto Blue Jays. He finished his rookie season with a 4.50 ERA and 2 strikeouts in 2 appearances. In 2015, Escobar spent the majority of the season in Triple-A Pawtucket, also playing in 1 game for the Single-A Greenville Drive, and pitched to a 3–3 record and 4.97 ERA with 24 strikeouts in 20 games. He was assigned to Pawtucket to begin the 2016 season. Escobar was designated for assignment on April 20, 2016, to make room on the active roster for William Cuevas.

=== Arizona Diamondbacks ===
On April 29, 2016, Escobar was claimed off waivers by the Arizona Diamondbacks and optioned to the Triple-A Reno Aces. The Diamondbacks promoted Escobar to the major leagues to make his first major league start on May 30. In 25 games for Arizona, Escobar recorded a 7.23 ERA with 17 strikeouts in 23 2/3 innings pitched.

=== Hokkaido Nippon-Ham Fighters ===
On November 18, 2016, the Cleveland Indians claimed Escobar off waivers. Escobar was designated for assignment on January 5, 2017, to make room on the 40-man roster for Edwin Encarnación. He was released on January 10, to pursue a pitching opportunity in Japan.

On January 11, 2017, Escobar signed a one-year, $775,000 with the Hokkaido Nippon-Ham Fighters of Nippon Professional Baseball. In 14 games for the Fighters, Escobar registered a 1-2 record and 5.64 ERA with 19 strikeouts in 22 1/3 innings of work.

=== Yokohama DeNA BayStars ===
On July 7, 2017, Escobar was traded to the Yokohama DeNA BayStars in exchange for catcher Toshiki Kurobane. The BayStars re-signed him in the offseason to a one-year deal worth roughly $500,000. He finished the 2017 season with a 3.44 ERA and 33 strikeoutsin 27 games for the BayStars. In 2018, Escobar pitched in 53 games for the team, posting a 4–3 record and 3.57 ERA with 54 strikeouts in 53 innings pitched.

Escobar agreed to another one-year contract with the BayStars for the 2019 season worth roughly $854,000. That season, Escobar pitched to a 5–4 record and 2.51 ERA with 88 strikeouts in 74 appearances. On November 18, 2019, Escobar signed an additional one-year extension, worth roughly $1.5 million, to remain with the BayStars. In 2020, Escobar logged a 1-4 record and 2.33 ERA with 58 strikeouts in 54 innings pitched across 56 games.

On November 7, 2023, following the regular season, the BayStars announced that Escobar was no longer under contract with the team and that they would begin negotiations regarding a new contract. In 7 seasons in NPB, he had registered a 22-23 record and 3.17 ERA with 383 strikeouts across 392 1/3 innings pitched.

=== Chicago Cubs ===
On November 20, 2023, Escobar signed a minor league contract with the Chicago Cubs. In 31 appearances for the Triple–A Iowa Cubs, he recorded a 4.86 ERA with 47 strikeouts across 46 1/3 innings pitched. Escobar was released by the Cubs organization on July 16, 2024.

=== Sultanes de Monterrey ===
On July 22, 2024, Escobar signed with the Sultanes de Monterrey of the Mexican League. In 4 games for Monterrey, he struggled to a 6.75 ERA with 5 strikeouts over 4 innings of work. Escobar was released by the Sultanes on March 3, 2025.

=== Leones de Yucatán ===
On May 16, 2025, Escobar signed with the Leones de Yucatán of the Mexican League. In 44 relief appearances, he posted a 4–5 record with a 3.86 ERA and 31 strikeouts in 37 1/3 innings of work.

Escobar made 25 relief appearances for the Leones in 2026, posting a 2–3 record with a 7.23 ERA and 14 strikeouts across 18 2/3 innings pitched. On June 7, 2026, Escobar was waived by Yucatán.

=== Diablos Rojos del México ===
On June 9, 2026, Escobar was claimed off waivers by the Diablos Rojos del México of the Mexican League. In eight relief appearances, he posted a 1–1 record with a 6.75 ERA, two strikeouts, and eight walks across eight innings pitched. On July 4, Escobar was released by the Diablos.

=== Saraperos de Saltillo ===
On July 7, 2026, Escobar signed with the Saraperos de Saltillo of the Mexican League. He made one relief appearance, surrendering no runs or hits in 2/3 innings pitched. On July 10, Escobar was released by Saltillo.

== Personal life ==
Escobar is son of shortstop José Escobar, as well as cousin of outfielder Ronald Acuña Jr., infielders Luisangel Acuña and Alcides Escobar, and pitchers Kelvim Escobar and Vicente Campos.

== See also ==
- List of Major League Baseball players from Venezuela
