= Ronald Acuña Jr. =

Venezuelan baseball player (born 1997)

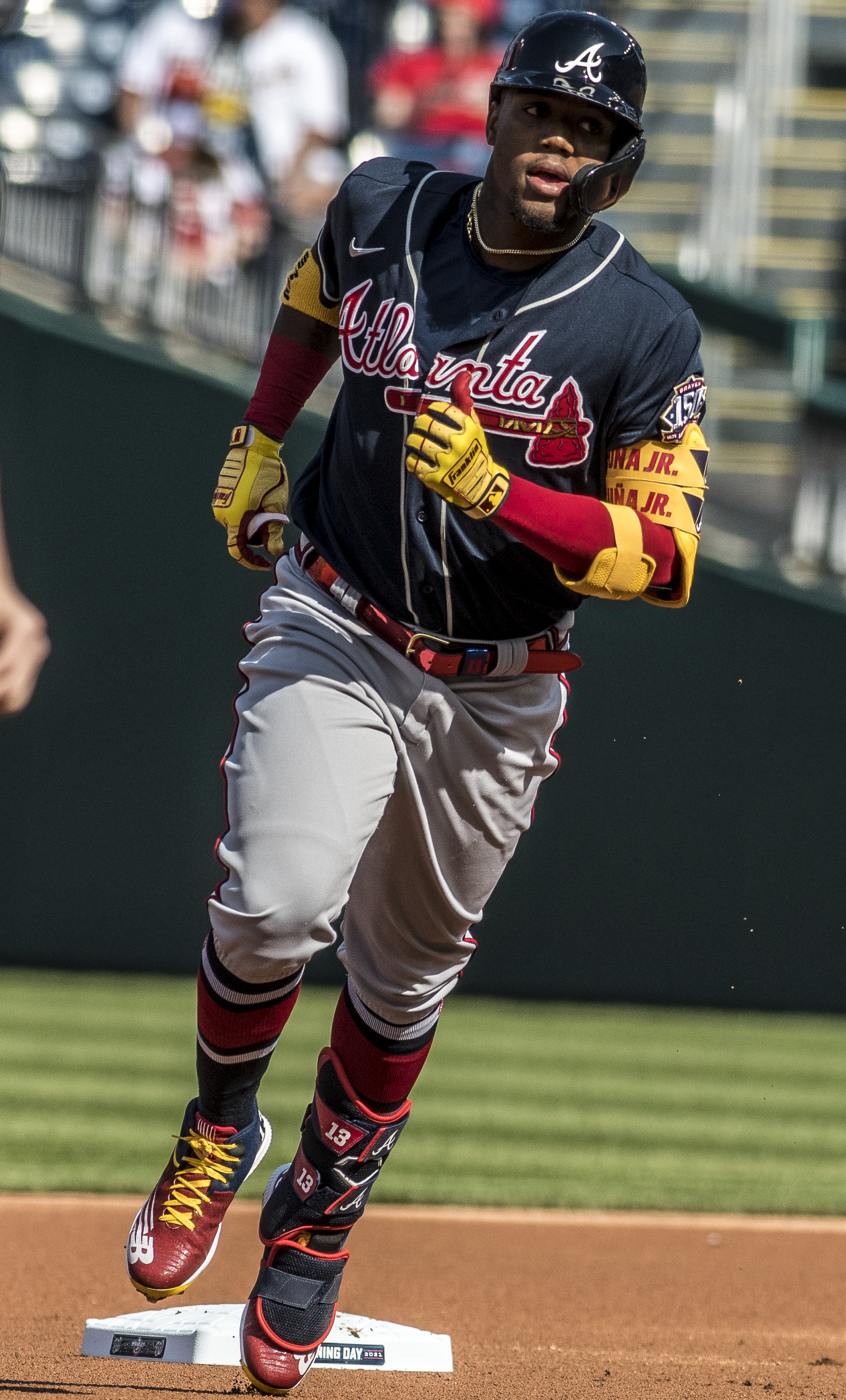
- Acuña with the Atlanta Braves in 2021

Atlanta Braves – No. 13
- Outfielder
- Born: December 18, 1997 (age 28); La Guaira, Venezuela
- Bats: Right Throws: Right

MLB debut
- April 25, 2018, for the Atlanta Braves

MLB statistics (through 2026 season)
- Batting average: .285
- Hits: 1,017
- Home runs: 206
- Runs batted in: 514
- Stolen bases: 226
- Stats at Baseball Reference

Teams
- Atlanta Braves (2018–present)

Career highlights and awards
- 5× All-Star (2019, 2021–2023, 2025); NL MVP (2023); All-MLB First Team (2023); NL Rookie of the Year (2018); 3× Silver Slugger Award (2019, 2020, 2023); NL Hank Aaron Award (2023); NL Comeback Player of the Year (2025); 2× NL stolen base leader (2019, 2023)
Medals
Men's baseball
Representing Venezuela
World Baseball Classic
Gold medal – first place	2026 Miami	Team

Ronald José Acuña Blanco Jr. (born December 18, 1997) is a Venezuelan professional baseball outfielder for the Atlanta Braves of Major League Baseball (MLB). After signing with the Braves as an international free agent in 2014, Acuña made his MLB debut in 2018, and won the National League Rookie of the Year Award.

Since 2018, Acuña has made five MLB All-Star team appearances, won three Silver Slugger Awards, and twice led the league in stolen bases. During the 2023 season, he became the fifth MLB member of the 40–40 club, set a modern-era franchise record in stolen bases, with 73, and became the first MLB player to accomplish a 40–70 season. Acuña won the 2023 National League Most Valuable Player Award. In 2026, Acuña helped Venezuela win its first ever World Baseball Classic.

== Career ==
=== Minor leagues ===
Acuña signed with the Atlanta Braves for $100,000 as an international free agent in July 2014. He made his professional debut in 2015 with the Gulf Coast Braves and was promoted to the Danville Braves that season. In 55 games between the two teams, he batted .269 with four home runs, 18 RBIs, and 16 stolen bases.

In 2016, he slashed .312/.392/.429 with four home runs and 19 RBIs in only 42 games combined between the Gulf Coast Braves and Rome Braves due to an injury. After the season, he played for the Melbourne Aces of the Australian Baseball League and was named an ABL All-Star. Acuña made his first appearances in Grapefruit League games at the start of the 2017 season as an extra player originally assigned to minor league camp. He began the year with the Florida Fire Frogs of the Class A-Advanced Florida State League and was later promoted to the Mississippi Braves of the Class AA Southern League. Acuña was named to the All-Star Futures Game roster in July, and played the whole game, one of three World Team members to do so. He reported to the Gwinnett Braves of the Class AAA International League immediately after the All-Star break, making his International League debut against the Charlotte Knights, during which he hit an opposite-field home run in his second at bat. For the year, Acuña appeared in 139 games, hitting .325/.374/.522 with 21 homers, 82 RBIs and 44 stolen bases.

After the 2017 minor league regular season ended, Acuña was invited to join the Arizona Fall League and was assigned to the Peoria Javelinas. He played 23 games in the AFL hitting .325/.414/.639 alongside seven home runs, winning the league championship and claiming league MVP honors, becoming the AFL's youngest most valuable player.

Baseball America ranked Acuña as the No. 1 Major League Baseball prospect heading into the 2018 season. MLB.com ranked him second to Japanese pitcher/hitter Shohei Ohtani. Acuña began the year at major league spring training. Despite a .432 average and four home runs in spring training, Acuña was reassigned to minor league camp on March 19, 2018. He reported to the Gwinnett Stripers to begin the 2018 season.

=== Atlanta Braves ===
==== 2018 ====
On April 25, 2018, at the age of just 20 years, 128 days, the Braves promoted Acuña to the major leagues. This made him the youngest player in Major League Baseball at that time, supplanting teammate Ozzie Albies who was 11 months older. Though Acuña wore uniform number 24 throughout his minor league career in honor of Miguel Cabrera, he made his major league debut on April 25, 2018, wearing number 13. Against the Cincinnati Reds, Acuña collected his first career hit off Kevin Shackelford. He finished the game 1-for-5 and scored the game-tying run in the eighth inning as the Braves won 5–4. The next day, also against the Reds, Acuña hit his first MLB home run off Homer Bailey. He finished the game 3-for-4 as the Braves won 7–4. On May 28, Acuña was placed on the 10-day disabled list due to a mild ACL sprain and a bruise in his left knee as well as back contusion. On June 21, the Braves optioned Acuña to Triple-A Gwinnett for a rehab assignment.

Acuña regularly hit in the leadoff spot in the lineup after the All-Star break. His performance improved markedly as he implemented an adjustment to his batting stance at the suggestion of Kevin Seitzer. While playing against the Miami Marlins on August 13, 2018, Acuña became the fourth player in the history of Major League Baseball to hit a home run to lead off both games of a doubleheader. Additionally, he had hit a home run in his last four games, becoming the youngest player since 1920 to accomplish the feat. By hitting a home run off Trevor Richards on August 14, Acuña became the youngest major leaguer ever to hit home runs in five consecutive games, as well as the fifth batter in Atlanta Braves history to do so. Facing Adam Conley later that same game, Acuña hit his second home run of the night, marking the first time he had ever hit more than one home run in a game.

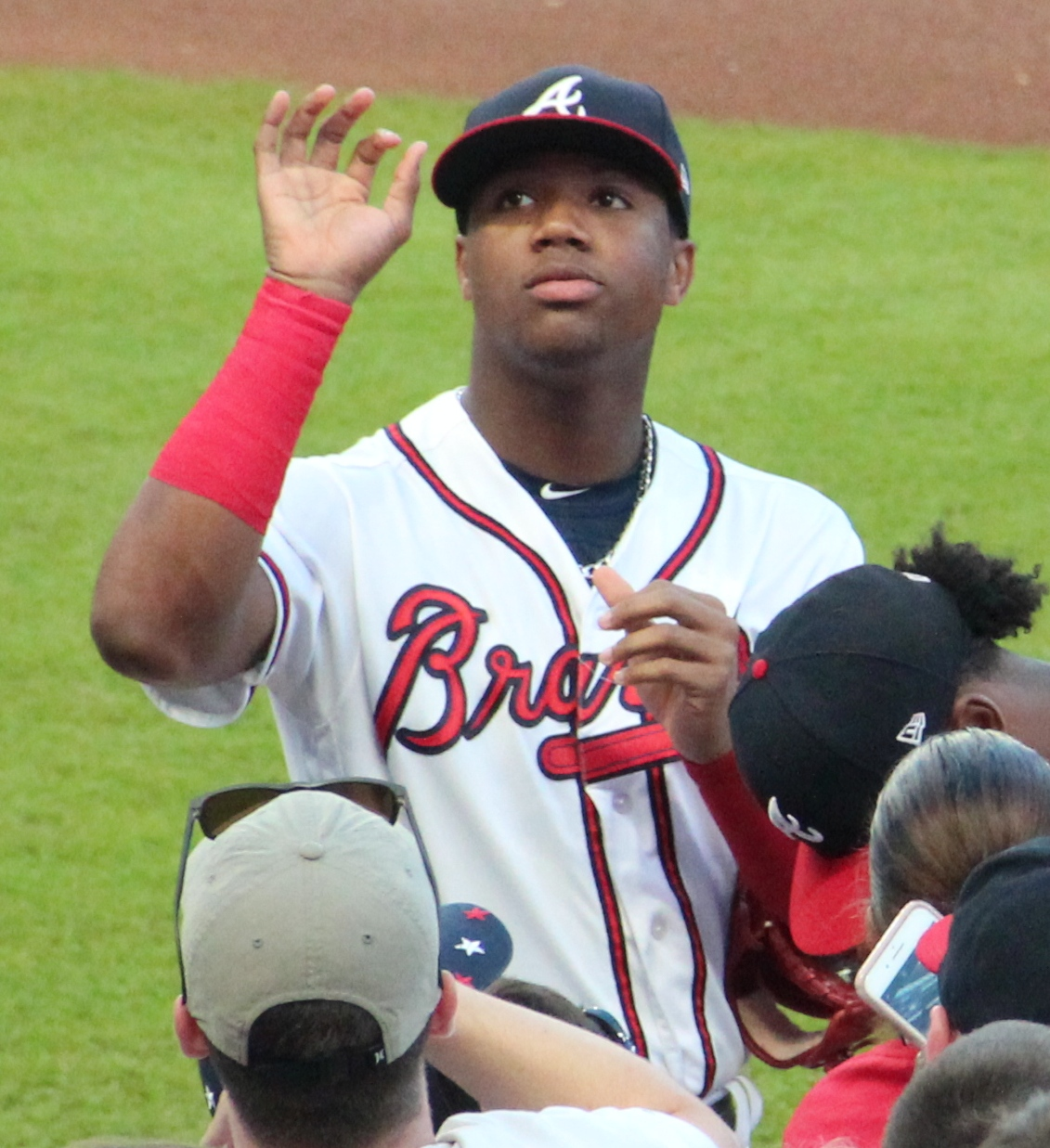
Acuña at SunTrust Park in 2018.

In the finale of the Braves' series against the Marlins on August 15, Acuña faced José Ureña, who hit him with the first pitch of the game. Ureña was ejected from the game, while Acuña was replaced in the field at the top of the second inning. Acuña played the Braves' next game against the Colorado Rockies on August 16. When Acuña next played the Marlins on August 23, he hit another home run, and was subsequently struck by another pitch. His production during the month of August won him the Major League Baseball Rookie of the Month Award. On September 2, Acuña hit his seventh leadoff home run, tying a Braves team record, set by Marquis Grissom, for such home runs in a season. Three days later, Acuña broke the team's leadoff home run record in a game against the Boston Red Sox. With his 25th home run on September 9, Acuña became the seventh player in MLB history to hit that many home runs while under the age of 21. Later that month, it was announced that Acuña would be playing in the MLB Japan All-Star Series scheduled for November. With his fifteenth stolen base on September 22, 2018, Acuña became the fourth player in MLB history to record a 25–15 season, while aged 20 or below, alongside Alex Rodriguez, Orlando Cepeda, and Mike Trout. Overall with the 2018 Braves, Acuña appeared in 111 MLB games, batting .293 with 26 home runs and 64 RBIs.

On October 7, in a National League Division Series game against the Los Angeles Dodgers, Acuña became the youngest player in MLB history to hit a postseason grand slam, aged 20 years, 293 days, off Dodgers pitcher Walker Buehler. On November 12, he was named the National League Rookie of the Year.

==== 2019 ====
On April 2, 2019, Acuña and the Braves agreed to an eight-year contract worth $100 million. The extension included team options for the 2027 and 2028 seasons. Aged 21 years, 105 days, Acuña became the youngest player in baseball history to sign a contract worth at least $100 million. Acuña's deal was the largest for any player with less than one year of major league service. By June 2019, Acuña had drawn attention for his power production. At midseason, he was named a starting outfielder for the National League in the 2019 Major League Baseball All-Star Game, and invited to take part in that year's Home Run Derby.

On August 9, Acuña hit his 30th home run of the 2019 season while facing Marlins pitcher Tayron Guerrero. Acuña joined the 30–30 club on August 24, in a game against the New York Mets. He became the second-youngest player, aged 21 years, 286 days, to reach the milestone, after Mike Trout. With his 40th home run on September 19, Acuña became the youngest major leaguer to enter the 40–30 club. He reported a minor injury in the penultimate series of the Braves' 2019 season, and was rested for the remainder of the regular season.

For the year, Acuña hit .280/.365/.518/.883, with 127 runs (leading the National League), 41 home runs, and 37 stolen bases (leading the NL). Acuña missed the 40–40 club by three stolen bases. He led the major leagues in power–speed number (38.9). Acuña and teammates Ozzie Albies and Freddie Freeman won the 2019 National League Silver Slugger Awards for outfield, second base, and first base, respectively.

==== 2020 ====
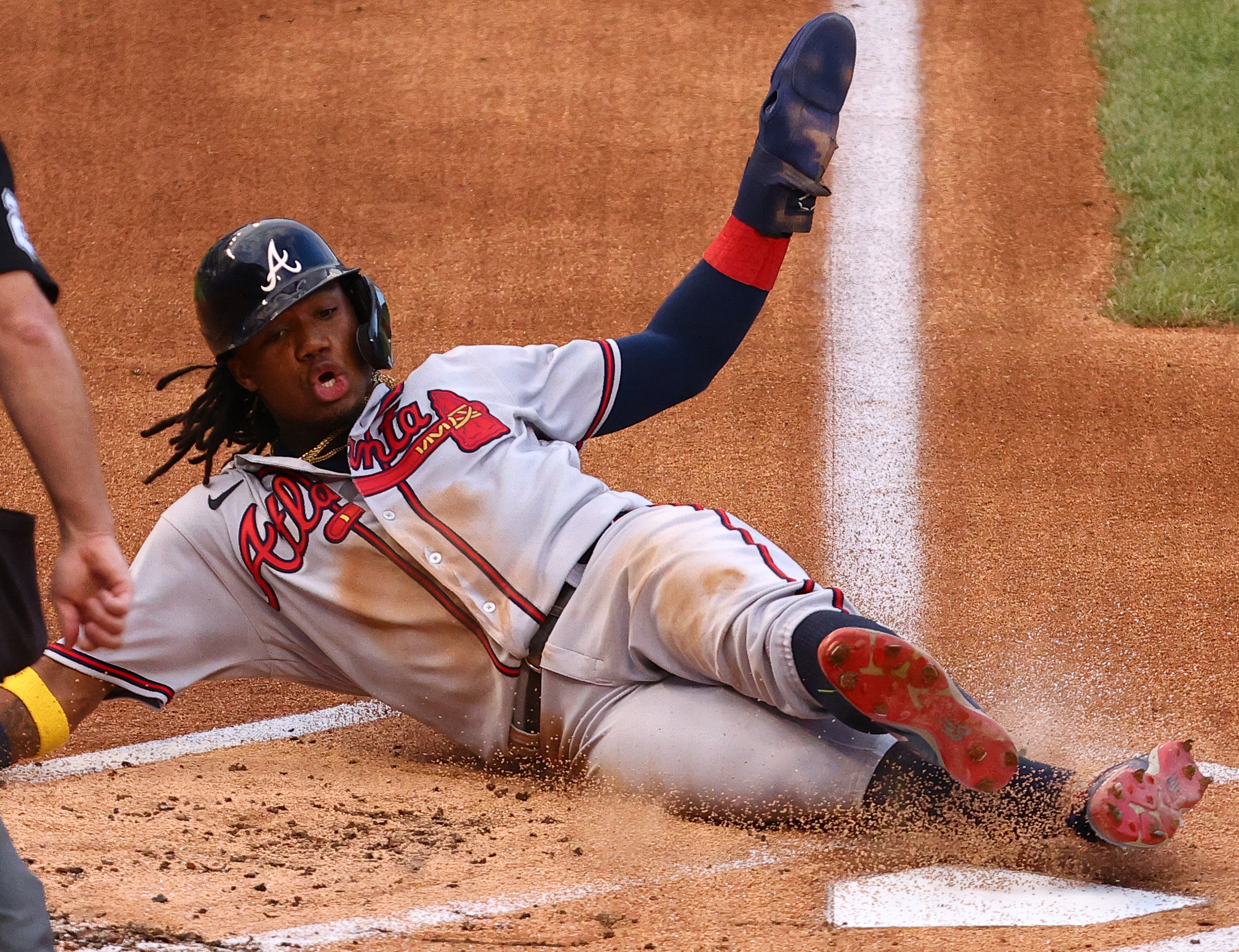
Acuña scoring a run during a 2020 game at Nationals Park.

During a season shortened by the COVID-19 pandemic, the Braves won the division for the third time in a row, earning a league-record 20th division title. Near the end of the season, Acuña hit a 495-foot home run against the Red Sox; it was the longest MLB home run that year and the longest home run ever hit at Truist Park. In 2020, he batted .250/.406/.581, with 14 home runs and 29 RBIs in 160 at-bats and led the league in at bats per home run. He was awarded his second consecutive Silver Slugger Award and finished in twelfth place in voting for the Most Valuable Player Award.

==== 2021 ====
On May 3, Acuña was named National League Player of the Month for April, batting .341/.443/.705 with eight home runs, three stolen bases, 18 RBIs, and 25 runs scored in 24 games. On May 19, Acuña hit his first career walk-off home run against the New York Mets to give the Braves a 5–4 win.

On July 10, 2021, Acuña suffered a leg injury while trying to field a fly ball and was taken off the field on a motorized stretcher. An MRI showed a complete tear in his right anterior cruciate ligament, which prematurely ended his 2021 season. In 82 games, Acuña hit .283/.394/.596 with 24 home runs, 52 RBIs and 17 stolen bases in 2021. In 2021, he had the fastest sprint speed of all major league right fielders, at 29.4 feet/second. He led the major leagues with 72 runs scored at the time of his injury. Acuña was elected to start the 2021 All-Star Game alongside teammates Freddie Freeman and Ozzie Albies but was unable to participate due to the injury. Despite Acuña's injury, the Braves went on to win the 2021 World Series. Though he was not on the postseason roster, Acuña earned a World Series ring for his contributions.

==== 2022 ====
Acuña did not participate in spring training games, as rehabilitation from his leg injury continued into the 2022 season. Acuña remained at the Braves' spring training facility and played in simulated games until being assigned to the Gwinnett Stripers during the third week of April. He was activated from the injured list on April 27. Acuña received the most votes of any National League player and was duly selected as a starting outfielder for the 2022 Major League Baseball All-Star Game. On July 11, 2022, it was announced that Acuña would participate in the 2022 Home Run Derby. Acuña finished the season batting .266/.351/.413 with 15 home runs, 50 RBIs and 29 stolen bases in 119 games. He led the National League with 11 times caught stealing.

==== 2023 ====
Acuña was named the NL Player of the Month for April after hitting .352/.440/.546 with 13 stolen bases. He also led the league in multi-hit games in April, with 13. For the second year in a row, Acuña received the most votes of any player in the National League and thus was designated a starting outfielder for the 2023 Major League Baseball All-Star Game. In addition, Acuña was named the NL Player of the Month for June after slashing .356/.429/.683 with nine home runs and 14 stolen bases.

On July 3, 2023, Acuña became the first player in MLB history to tally 40 stolen bases, 20 home runs, and 50 RBIs before the All-Star break. On July 29, Acuña stole his 50th base, becoming the first player since 2017 to reach the mark, and becoming the first player in MLB history to join the 20–50 club, hitting 20 home runs and 50 stolen bases, before August. On August 31, Acuña joined the 30–30 club for the second time in his career (2019) by hitting a grand slam for his 30th home run of the season. With the home run, he also became the first player in MLB history to record 30 home runs and 60 stolen bases in the same season. On September 22, Acuña joined the 40–40 club for the first time in his career, eventually becoming the first player in MLB history to record 40 home runs and 70 stolen bases in the same season. On September 30, Acuña broke the Braves' modern-era steals record set by Otis Nixon in 1991; Nixon had no home runs that season.

Acuña finished the regular season with a .337 batting average, 41 homers, 106 RBI, 73 steals, 217 hits, 149 runs and 383 total bases. Each of the latter four statistics led Major League Baseball. Acuña received one of the 2023 National League Silver Slugger Awards for outfielders, the second Silver Slugger Award of his career. Later that offseason, Acuña was named the National League Most Valuable Player. Shohei Ohtani won the American League equivalent, and, for the first time in the award's history, both AL and NL winners were selected unanimously. Acuña and Ohtani also won that year's Hank Aaron Award, for the NL and AL respectively. Acuña was the first Brave to win the Hank Aaron Award since Freddie Freeman in 2020. Acuña and his teammates Austin Riley and Spencer Strider were named to the All-MLB First Team.

==== 2024 ====
On April 22, 2024, Acuña recorded his 190th career stolen base, setting a franchise record in steals since the Braves moved to Atlanta in 1966.

On May 26, Acuña suffered a leg injury while taking a lead from second base against the Pittsburgh Pirates and, after being tended to by team trainers, was able to walk off the field. Initially believed to be knee soreness, the Braves later announced that an MRI showed a complete tear in his left anterior cruciate ligament and that he would miss the remainder of the 2024 season. In 49 games, Acuña hit .250/.351/.365 with 4 home runs, 15 RBI, and 16 stolen bases in 2024.

==== 2025 ====
Acuña returned to action on May 23, 2025, and hit a home run on the first pitch thrown by San Diego Padres pitcher Nick Pivetta. In that game, he went 2 for 4 with that first pitch home run, an RBI, and an outfield assist by getting Elías Díaz out at second base as Díaz was going for a double. On June 25, Acuña announced on SportsCenter that he would participate in the 2025 Major League Baseball Home Run Derby. Later on that same day in a game against the New York Mets, Acuña recorded his 200th career stolen base and becoming the 8th active player to reach the milestone as the Braves defeating the Mets 7–4. Due to that milestone, he became the 370th player to reach 200 stolen bases in a career. Acuña was selected as a starting outfielder for the National League in the All-Star Game. In 95 games, Acuña slashed .290/.417/.518 with 21 home runs, 42 RBIs, and 9 stolen bases. After the season was finished, he was named National League Comeback Player of the Year.

==== 2026 ====
On September 6, 2026, Acuña recorded his 1,000th Major League hit, a three-run, game-tying home run against the Philadelphia Phillies. Acuña became the only player other than Hank Aaron with 1,000 hits, 200 home runs and 200 stolen bases in Braves franchise history.

==== 2027 ====
On October 29, 2026, the Braves exercised the first team option in Acuña's contract.

== Player profile ==
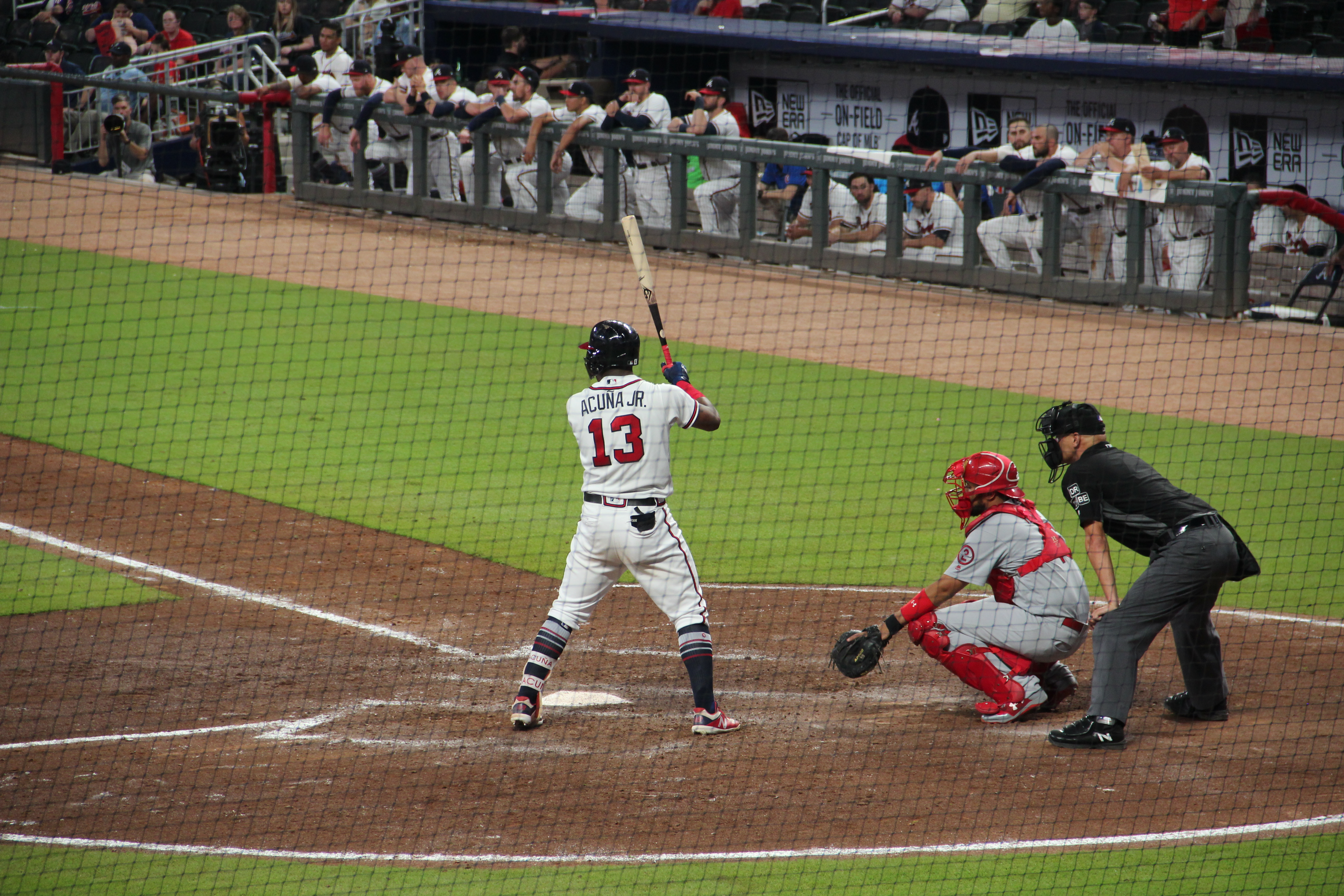
Acuña batting in 2018

=== Batting style ===
A powerful right-handed batter, Acuña has an all-around batting range. Former major league hitter Sean Casey compared Acuña's batting style to Roberto Clemente, as his natural core power and rotational torque allows him to hit without a backswing, keeping the knob of the bat pointing down at home plate (normally pointing towards the catcher during the backswing), yet still making contact and maintaining control of the barrel.

=== Baserunning ===
On the basepaths, Acuña starts like an infielder with a more upright stance, or a running back standing with a slight bend of the knees and hands on the knees to generate greater acceleration. According to Harold Reynolds, who adopted the Rickey Henderson technique for both baserunning and fielding, the stance also stops him from leaning or tipping-off fielders for base stealing.

== Personal life ==
Acuña's grandfather, Romualdo Blanco, and father, Ronald Acuña Sr., played minor league baseball. Acuña Sr. represented Venezuela at the 2011 Pan American Games. Acuña Jr. is the eldest of four sons. His mother is Leonelis Blanco. Two of his brothers currently play baseball professionally: Luisangel, who plays for the Chicago White Sox, and Bryan, who plays in the Minnesota Twins organization. An uncle, José Escobar, played for the Cleveland Indians in 1991, and several cousins have also played in Major League Baseball, namely Vicente Campos, Alcides Escobar, Edwin Escobar, Kelvim Escobar, and Maikel García.

Acuña married Maria Laborde on August 31, 2023. They had known each other for four years and announced their engagement in January 2023. The couple have two sons.

Ronald goes by the nickname "Sabanero Soy", which translates to "I am from the savannah" in English.

== See also ==
- List of Atlanta Braves award winners and league leaders
- List of Major League Baseball annual runs scored leaders
- List of Major League Baseball annual stolen base leaders
- List of Major League Baseball players from Venezuela

Awards and achievements
Preceded by Freddie Freeman	National League Player of the Month; April 2021	Succeeded by Fernando Tatís Jr.
