= José Escobar (baseball) =

Venezuelan baseball player (born 1960)

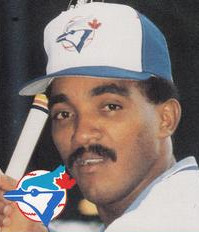
- Escobar in 1988
- Infielder
- Born: October 30, 1960 (age 64); Las Flores, Yaracuy State, Venezuela
- Batted: Right Threw: Right

MLB debut
- April 13, 1991, for the Cleveland Indians

Last MLB appearance
- May 11, 1991, for the Cleveland Indians

MLB statistics
- Batting average: .200
- Home runs: 0
- Runs batted in: 1
- Stats at Baseball Reference

Teams
- Cleveland Indians (1991)

José Elías Escobar Sánchez (born October 30, 1960) is a Venezuelan former Major League Baseball shortstop and right-handed batter who played for the Cleveland Indians (1991).

Escobar hit .200 (3-for-15) with one run batted in in 10 games.

== Personal life ==
- Escobar is the father of pitcher Edwin Escobar, as well as the uncle of shortstop Alcides Escobar, outfielder Ronald Acuña Jr., infielder Luisangel Acuña and pitchers Kelvim Escobar and Vicente Campos.

== See also ==
- List of Major League Baseball players from Venezuela
