= Maikel García =

Venezuelan baseball player (born 2000)

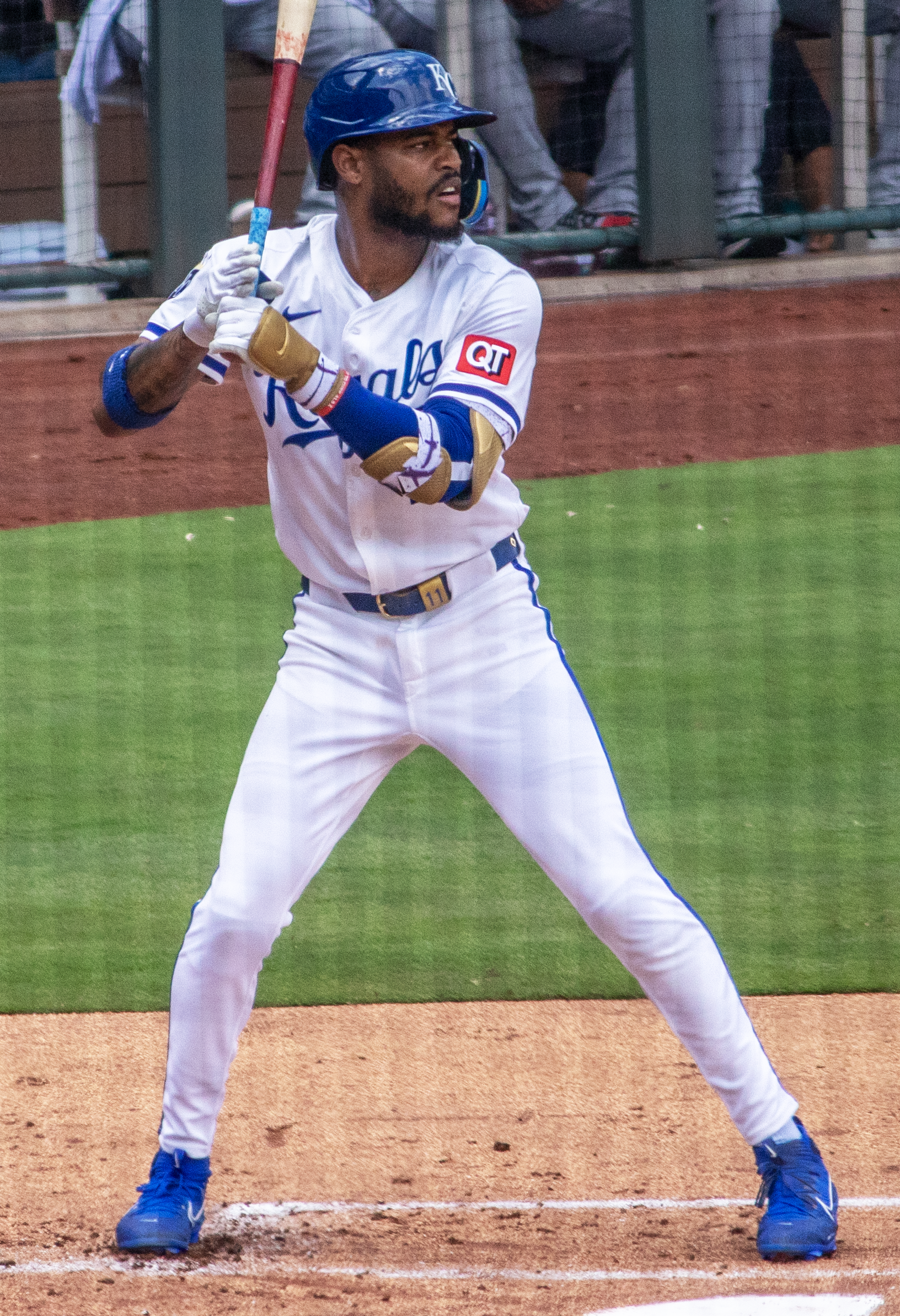
- García with the Royals in 2025

Seattle Mariners – No. 10
- Third baseman
- Born: March 3, 2000 (age 26); La Sabana, Venezuela
- Bats: Right Throws: Right

MLB debut
- July 15, 2022, for the Kansas City Royals

MLB statistics (through 2026 season)
- Batting average: .264
- Home runs: 30
- Runs batted in: 222
- Stats at Baseball Reference

Teams
- Kansas City Royals (2022–2026); Seattle Mariners (2027–present)

Career highlights and awards
- MLB: All-Star (2025); Gold Glove Award (2025); International: World Baseball Classic MVP (2026)
Medals
Men's baseball
Representing Venezuela
World Baseball Classic
Gold medal – first place	2026 Miami	Team

Maikel Jose García (Note: Latin American Spanish pronunciation: [ˈmajkel xoˈse garˈsia].) (born March 3, 2000) is a Venezuelan professional baseball third baseman for the Seattle Mariners of Major League Baseball (MLB). He made his MLB debut with the Kansas City Royals in 2022. In 2025, García was named to his first All-Star Game and won his first Gold Glove Award.

Internationally, García represents Venezuela. At the 2026 World Baseball Classic, he helped Venezuela win its first WBC championship and was named the tournament most valuable player.

== Professional career ==
=== Kansas City Royals ===
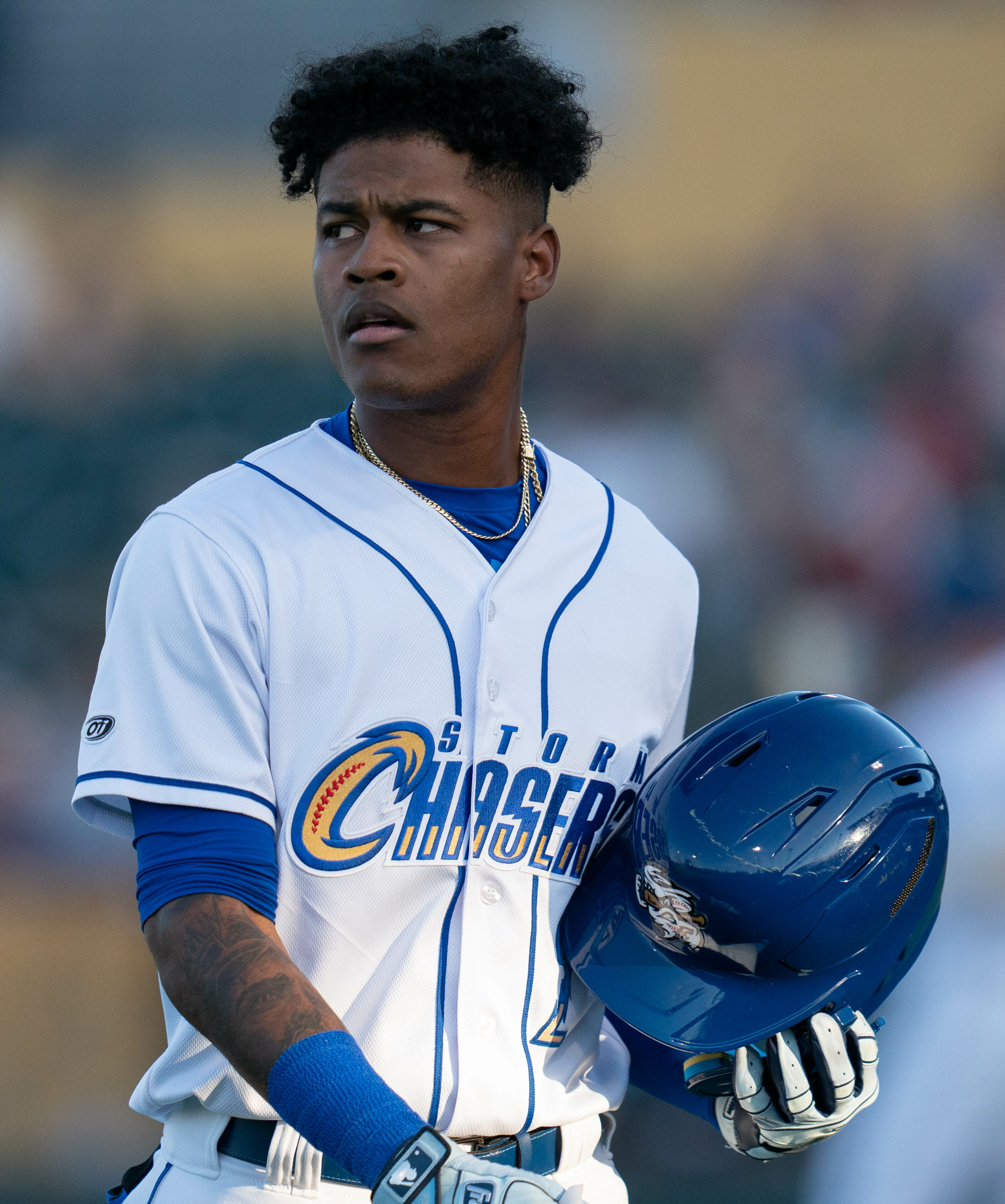
García with the Omaha Storm Chasers in 2022

García signed with the Kansas City Royals as an international free agent at the age of 16 on July 27, 2016. He made his professional debut with the Dominican Summer League Royals, hitting .223/.277/.242 with no home runs, 7 runs batted in (RBI), and 9 stolen bases. García split the 2018 season between the DSL Royals and the rookie-level Arizona League Royals, hitting a cumulative .222/.311/.260 with no home runs, 11 RBI, and 20 stolen bases in 52 contests. In 2019, he spent time with the Idaho Falls Chukars and Burlington Royals, both rookie-level teams, and batted .284/.349/.367 with one home run, 35 RBI, and 19 stolen bases in 57 games. García did not play in a game in 2020 due to the cancellation of the minor league season because of the COVID-19 pandemic.

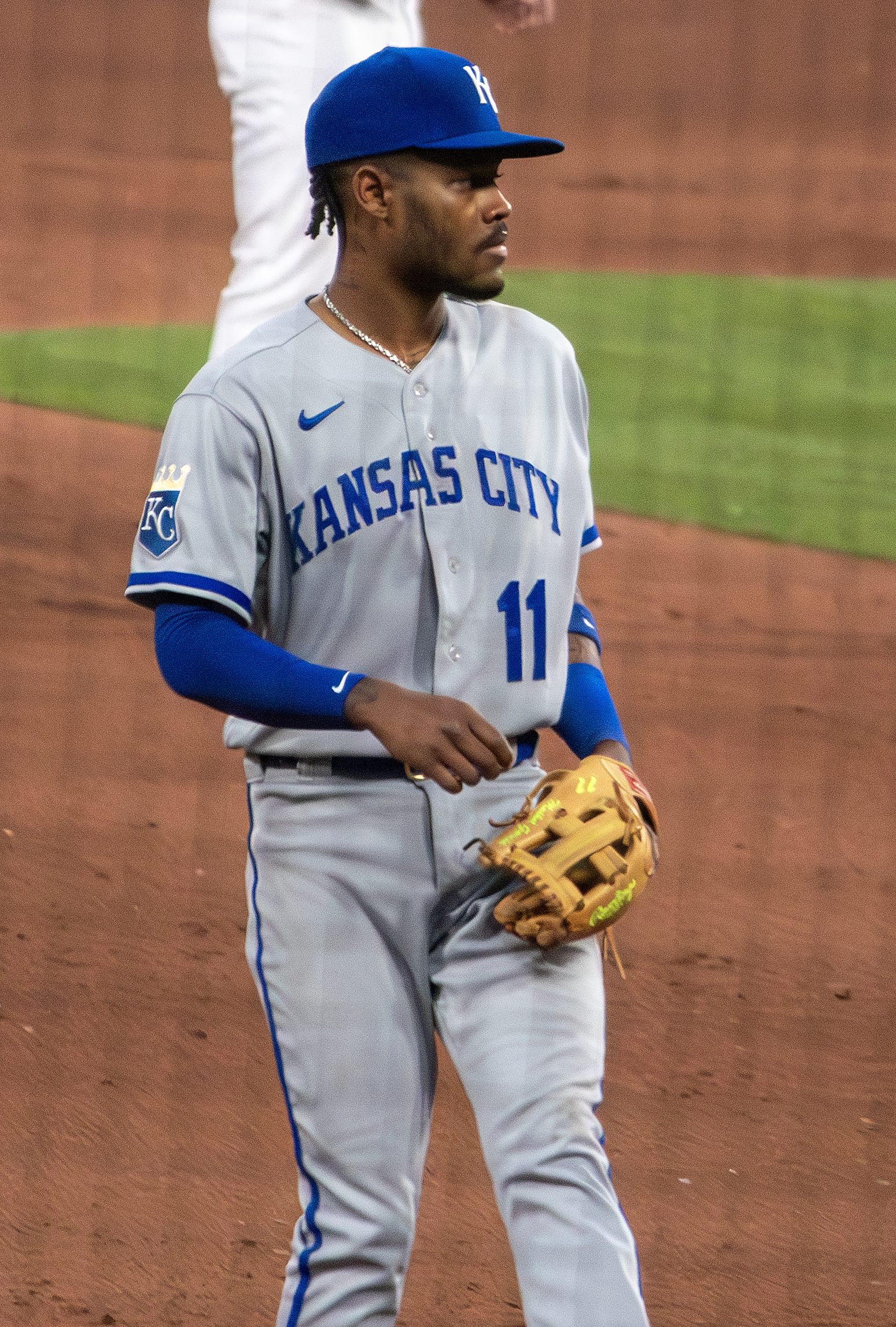
García in 2023

García split the 2021 season between the Single-A Columbia Fireflies and the High-A Quad Cities River Bandits, slashing .291/.380/.405 with 4 home runs, 50 RBI, and 35 stolen bases. The Royals added him to their 40-man roster after the season.

García was assigned to the Double-A Northwest Arkansas Naturals to begin the 2022 season. As a result of several Royals players being temporarily placed on MLB's restricted list because of COVID-19 protocols in Canada in advance of a series with the Toronto Blue Jays, García was promoted to the major leagues for the first time on July 14. He made his MLB debut the next day, striking out in his lone plate appearance. On July 17, he was optioned back to Double-A. In an 11–5 loss against the New York Yankees on July 30, García collected his first three career hits, the first of which was off of Yankees starter Gerrit Cole.

García was optioned to the Triple-A Omaha Storm Chasers to begin the 2023 season. On May 2, he was recalled to Kansas City following the placement of infielder Nicky Lopez on the 10-day injured list for appendicitis. Although his return to Kansas City was not intended to continue through the rest of the season, he slashed .267/.314/.333 in 35 plate appearances from May 2–8. On May 8, outfielder Franmil Reyes was designated for assignment, freeing a spot on the major league roster for García to stay. García finished the season with the Royals, where he went .272/.323/.358, with 126 hits, 4 home runs, 50 RBI, 38 walks, and 23 stolen bases.

In 2024, García slashed .231/.281/.332 with seven home runs and 58 RBI in 575 at-bats. He had the lowest on-base plus slugging in MLB, at .614. On December 5, García underwent surgery to remove a bone spur from his right elbow.

On July 11, 2025, García was named a All-Star for the first time in his career, replacing Brandon Lowe on the roster. In 2025, he slashed .286/.351/.449 with 16 home runs and 74 RBI in 595 at–bats. García won his first career Gold Glove Award for American League third basemen. On December 16, García and the Royals agreed to a five-year, $57.5 million contract extension.

García was limited to 82 games by a left hand and left hamstring injury. He hit .268.

=== Seattle Mariners ===
On November 18, 2026, the Royals traded García, James McArthur, and L.P. Langevin to the Seattle Mariners for Bryce Miller, José A. Ferrer, and Logan Evans.

== International career ==
García represented Venezuela during the 2026 World Baseball Classic (WBC), where he helped the team win their first WBC championship and was subsequently named the WBC Most Valuable Player. He had 10 hits in the tournament, including a critical two-run home run in the quarterfinal upset win over tournament favorites Japan and an RBI in the championship game. García finished the tournament with a .385 batting average and .970 OPS. Later in 2026, García became an inductee into the Venezuelan Baseball Hall of Fame as a member of the WBC championship team.

== Personal life ==
García's cousins include MLB players Alcides Escobar and Ronald Acuña Jr.
