= Alcides Escobar =

Venezuelan baseball player (born 1986)

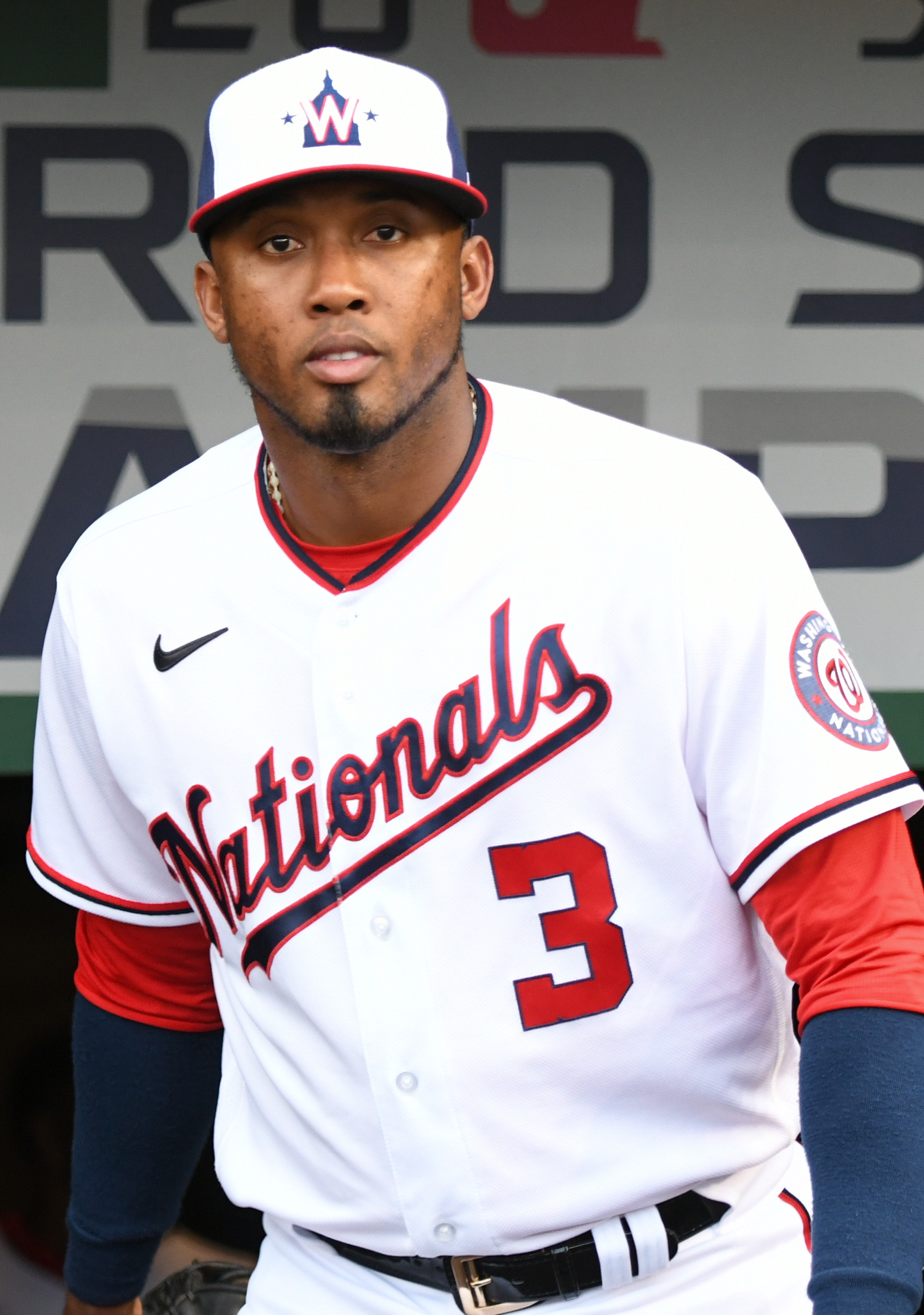
- Escobar with the Washington Nationals in 2022

Centauros de La Guaira – No. 2
- Shortstop / Second baseman
- Born: December 16, 1986 (age 39); La Sabana, Venezuela
- Bats: Right Throws: Right

Professional debut
- MLB: September 3, 2008, for the Milwaukee Brewers
- NPB: June 19, 2020, for the Tokyo Yakult Swallows

MLB statistics (through 2022 season)
- Batting average: .258
- Hits: 1,486
- Home runs: 45
- Runs batted in: 478
- Stolen bases: 178

NPB statistics (through 2020 season)
- Batting average: .273
- Home runs: 1
- Runs batted in: 30
- Stats at Baseball Reference

Teams
- Milwaukee Brewers (2008–2010); Kansas City Royals (2011–2018); Tokyo Yakult Swallows (2020); Washington Nationals (2021–2022)

Career highlights and awards
- All-Star (2015); World Series champion (2015); ALCS MVP (2015); Gold Glove Award (2015)

Alcides Escobar (Spanish: [alˈsiðes eskoˈβaɾ]) (born December 16, 1986) is a Venezuelan professional baseball infielder for the Centauros de La Guaira of the Venezuelan Major League. He has previously played in Major League Baseball (MLB) with the Milwaukee Brewers, Kansas City Royals, and Washington Nationals, and in Nippon Professional Baseball (NPB) for the Tokyo Yakult Swallows.

== Early and personal life ==
Escobar was born in La Sabana, Venezuela. Escobar is cousin to pitchers Edwin Escobar and Kelvim Escobar, infielders Maikel García and Luisangel Acuña and outfielder Ronald Acuña Jr. He is also the nephew of shortstop José Escobar. Escobar began playing baseball when he was four years old, stating how he idolized fellow Venezuelan shortstop Omar Vizquel.

On May 22, 2025, an arrest warrant was issued for Escobar after he failed to appear in court for a hearing regarding more than $20,000 in unpaid child support.

== Baseball career ==
=== Milwaukee Brewers ===
On July 9, 2003 (at age 16), Escobar signed with the Milwaukee Brewers as an international free agent for $35,000. Escobar made his professional debut in 2004 with the rookie-level Helena Brewers. In 2005, he played for the Single-A West Virginia Power, batting .271/.305/.362 with 2 home runs and 36 RBI. The following season, Escobar slashed .257/.296/.306 in 87 games for the High-A Brevard County Manatees. In 2007, he split time between Single-A and Double-A, playing 63 games for Brevard County in the Class A-Advanced Florida State League and 62 games for the Double-A Huntsville Stars of the Southern League. He batted a combined .306 with one home run and 53 runs batted in.

In 2008, Escobar played mostly for Huntsville. On September 1, 2008 (when rosters expanded), Escobar was called up to the Majors for the first time, and made his debut two days later as a defensive replacement at shortstop. He picked up his first career hit in his first at bat in the same game, a single against pitcher Scott Schoeneweis of the New York Mets.

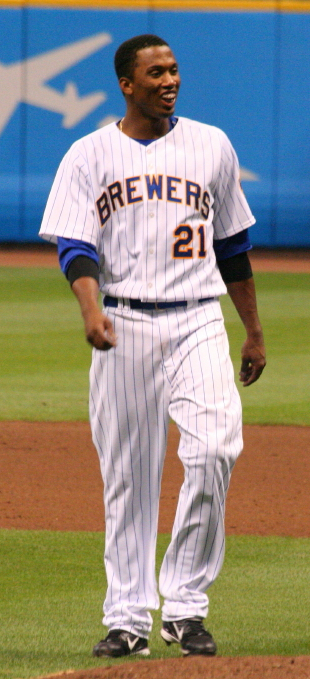
Escobar with the Milwaukee Brewers in 2009

Before the 2009 season, Baseball America rated Escobar the 19th best prospect in baseball. In 2009, Escobar appeared in the All-Star Futures Game as the starting shortstop for the World team. During the game, he went 2-for-4 and scored the go-ahead run. On August 12, Escobar was called up to the Brewers from the Triple-A Nashville Sounds to replace J. J. Hardy, who had been optioned down. He made his first major league appearance of the season that night, pinch running for Prince Fielder in the bottom of the 9th inning against the San Diego Padres. Escobar stole second base, his first stolen base of his career.

After the end of the 2009 season, the Brewers traded Hardy to the Minnesota Twins, making Escobar the starting shortstop for the Brewers in 2010. Prior to the 2010 season, Baseball America rated Escobar as the best prospect in baseball.

=== Kansas City Royals ===
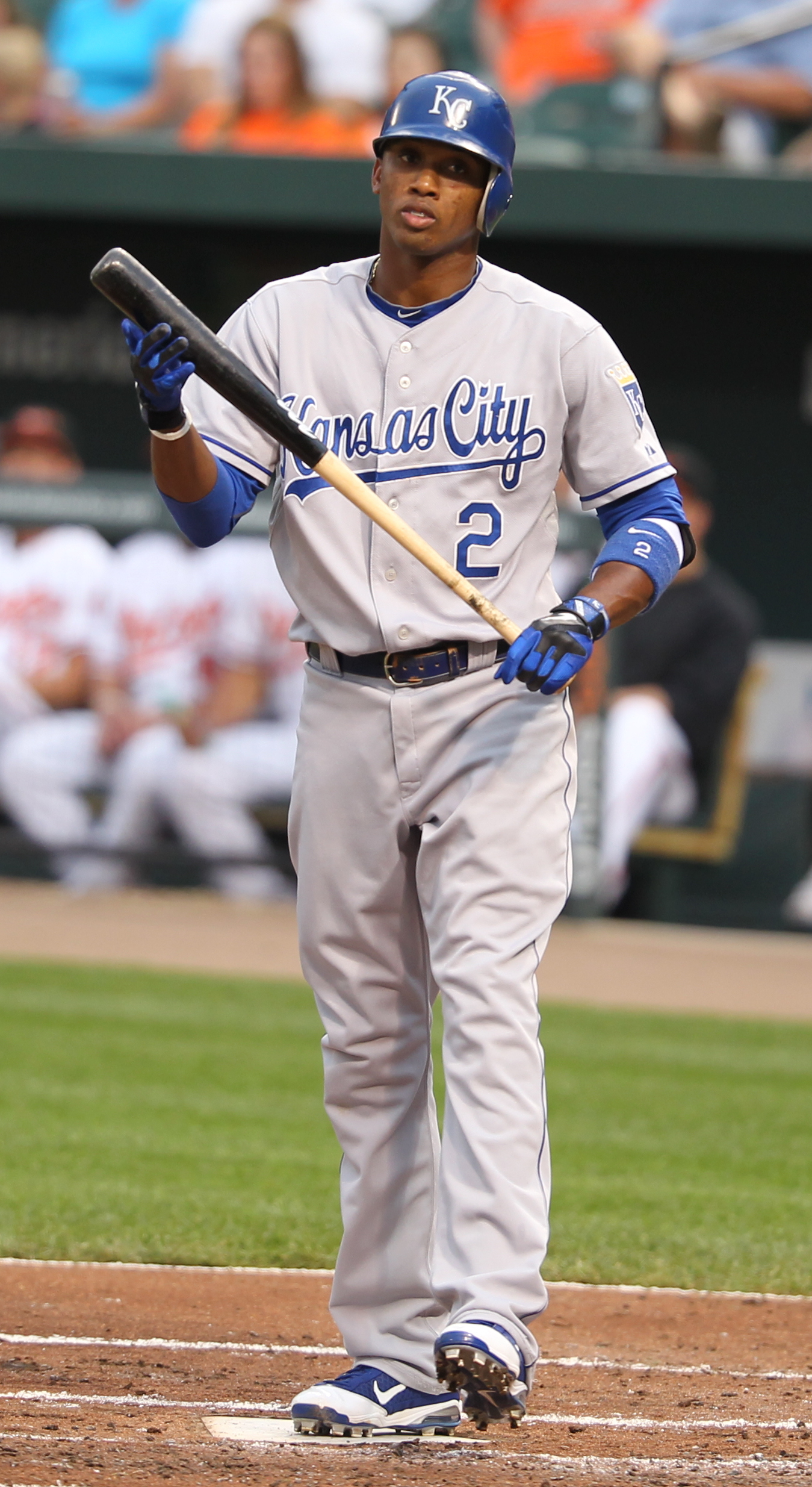
Escobar with the Kansas City Royals in 2011

On December 18, 2010, the Brewers traded Escobar, Lorenzo Cain, Jeremy Jeffress and Jake Odorizzi to the Kansas City Royals for Zack Greinke and Yuniesky Betancourt. In 2011 he batted .254/.290/.343 with 4 home runs and 46 RBI in 158 games.

On March 15, 2012, Escobar signed a four-year, $10 million extension through 2015 with club options for 2016 and 2017 with the Royals. If both options were exercised, Escobar could earn $21.75 million. Escobar, who was slated to earn $519,500 in 2012, would instead earn $1 million in 2012 and $3 million a year from 2013 to 2015. His 2016 option was worth $5.25 million and had a $500,000 buyout. His 2017 option was worth $6.5 million and had a $500,000 buyout. The extension covered his final pre-arbitration season and his three arbitration-eligible seasons. The club options covered his first year of free agency.

In 2013, Escobar batted .234/.259/.300, and his .259 on base percentage was the lowest of all qualified MLB batters. His .300 slugging percentage was also the lowest among all qualified batters in MLB. In 2014, Escobar (along with Evan Longoria, Hunter Pence and Freddie Freeman) was one of the only players in the MLB to start in all 162 regular season games for their respective teams. He finished the season hitting .285, with 74 runs scored, 50 RBIs, and 31 stolen bases.

In 2015, Escobar batted .257/.293/.320. He led the majors in with 11 sacrifice hits. His .320 slugging percentage was the lowest of all qualified major league batters. He also had the lowest ISO (isolated power) of all MLB players in 2015, at .064.

During the 2015 ALCS, Escobar set a postseason record by getting a lead-off hit in four consecutive games. He was selected as the 2015 ALCS MVP as he batted .478 in the series. In Game 1 of the 2015 World Series, Escobar hit an inside-the-park home run on the first pitch thrown by New York Mets pitcher Matt Harvey. It was the first time a player had hit an inside-the-park home run in a World Series game since 1929. Escobar followed that with driving in two runs, and scoring once on two hits in Game 2. In Game 5, Escobar hit a double in the 12th inning, allowing Christian Colon to score and help the Royals defeat the Mets 7–2 in 12 innings, making the 2015 Kansas City Royals World Series Champions. In the 2015 postseason, Escobar hit .329 in 70 at bats. He had 23 hits including four doubles and three triples, 13 runs scored and 9 RBI. He received the 2015 AL Rawlings Gold Glove Award for shortstops.

In 2016, he batted .261/.292/.350. He again led the majors in sacrifice hits, with 10. On June 3, Escobar got his 1000th career Major League hit against Cleveland Indians pitcher Danny Salazar.

The Royals exercised Escobar's $6.5 million option for 2017. He batted .250/.272/.357 in 599 at bats, and shared the major league lead with 7 sacrifice hits. His .272 on base percentage was the lowest, and his .357 slugging percentage was the third-lowest, among all qualified batters in MLB. He stole four bases, but was caught seven times.

On January 29, 2018, Escobar re-signed with the Royals with a one-year, $2.5 million deal. In 2018, he batted .231 (a career low)/.279/.313. His .313 slugging percentage was the second-lowest among all qualified batters in MLB.

=== Chicago White Sox ===
On February 16, 2019, Escobar signed a minor-league contract with the Baltimore Orioles which included an invitation to spring training. On March 20, 2019, Escobar was granted his outright release from the Orioles.

On March 22, 2019, Escobar signed a minor league deal with the Chicago White Sox. He was assigned to the Triple-A Charlotte Knights to begin the year. After hitting .286/.343/.444 with 10 home runs and 70 RBI, Escobar was released by the organization on August 2.

=== Tokyo Yakult Swallows ===
On October 30, 2019, Escobar signed with the Tokyo Yakult Swallows of Nippon Professional Baseball (NPB). On January 31, 2020, he held a press conference with Gabriel Ynoa and Matt Koch.

On June 19, he made his NPB debut. On July 15, Escobar hit his first career NPB home run off Hanshin Tigers pitcher Onelki García. In 104 games with Yakult, Escobar slashed .273/.312/.329 with 1 home run and 30 RBI. On November 23, 2020, he became a free agent.

=== Kansas City Royals (second stint) ===
On May 4, 2021, Escobar signed a minor league contract with the Kansas City Royals organization and was assigned to the Triple-A Omaha Storm Chasers. In 35 games with Omaha, Escobar posted a .274/.311/.452 slash with 5 home runs and 16 RBI.

=== Washington Nationals ===
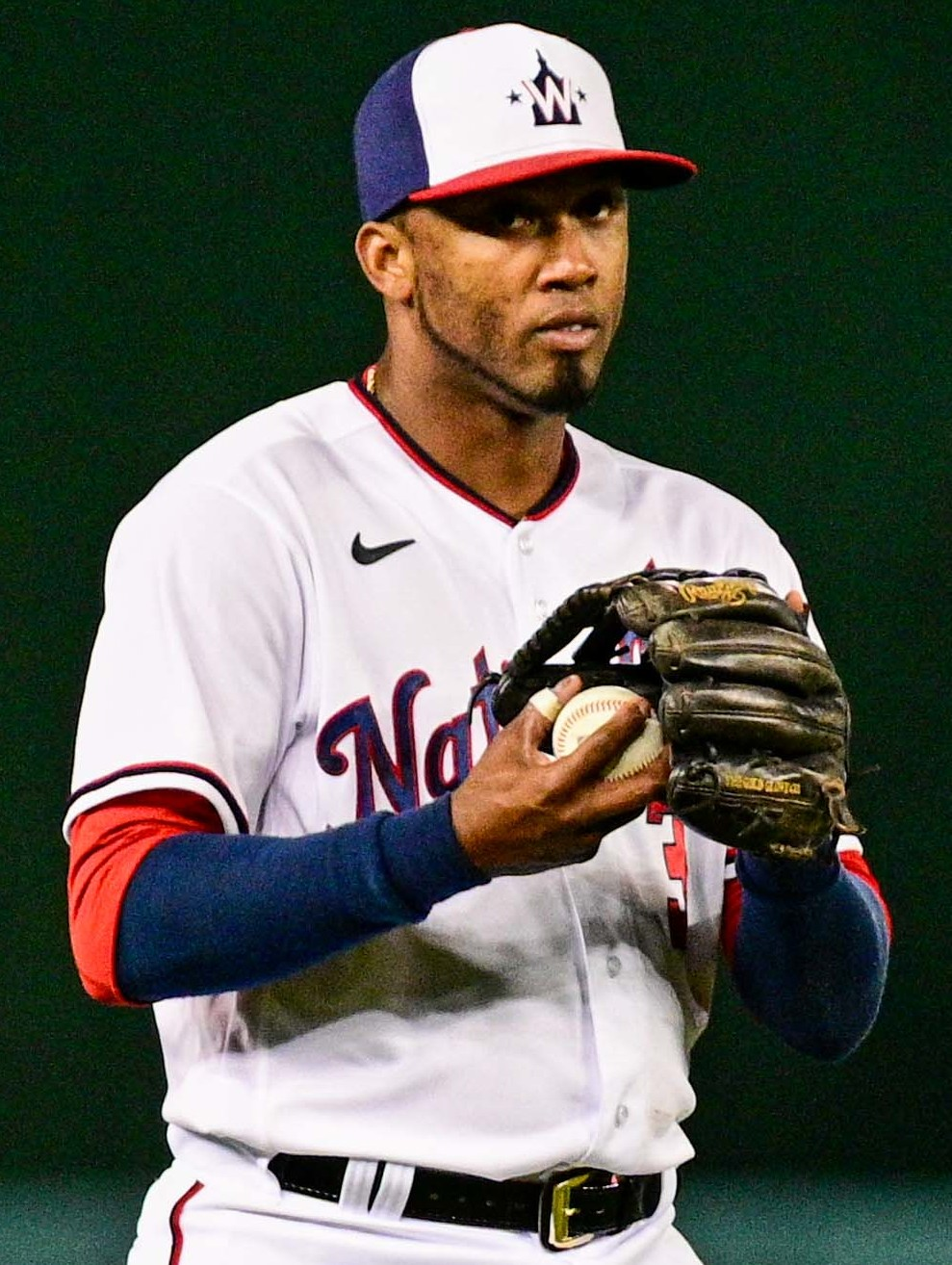
Escobar with the Nationals in 2022

On July 2, 2021, Escobar was traded to the Washington Nationals in exchange for cash considerations. He was selected to the active roster on July 3. On July 18, Escobar hit his first major-league home run since the 2018 season against the San Diego Padres to pull the Nationals within one run in the eighth inning, and hit a walk-off single in the ninth to lead them to an 8–7 victory.

Escobar finished out the 2021 season with the Nationals batting .288/.340/.404, his best totals since 2012. He then signed a one-year contract extension through the 2022 season on October 5, 2021. In 2021, he had the lowest average exit velocity of all major league batters, at 81.7 mph.

Escobar made his pitching debut against the Philadelphia Phillies, tossing a scoreless inning in the bottom of the 8th on July 5, 2022.

On August 3, 2022, Escobar was placed on unconditional release waivers. He had appeared in 40 games for Washington, slashing .218/.260/.282 with no home runs and 8 RBI.

=== Leones de Yucatán ===
On March 1, 2023, Escobar signed with the Leones de Yucatán of the Mexican League. In 55 games, he batted .240/.296/.299 with 1 home run and 17 RBIs. Escobar was waived on July 3.

=== Acereros de Monclova ===
On July 9, 2023, Escobar signed with the Acereros de Monclova of the Mexican League. In 26 games for Monclova, he batted .330/.368/.523 with 5 home runs and 17 RBI.

=== Tigres de Quintana Roo ===
On February 15, 2024, Escobar signed with the Tigres de Quintana Roo of the Mexican League. In 77 games for the Tigres, he batted .271/.320/.387 with five home runs, 32 RBI, and four stolen bases. Escobar was released by Quintana Roo on December 9.

=== Tiburones de La Guaira ===
On April 8, 2025, Escobar signed with the Tiburones de La Guaira of the Venezuelan Major League. He did not play in a game with them in 2025.

He returned to La Guaira in 2026. In 43 games he batted .343/.413/.416 with one home run and 18 RBIs.

== See also ==
- List of players from Venezuela in Major League Baseball
