= Drake Baldwin =

American baseball player (born 2001)

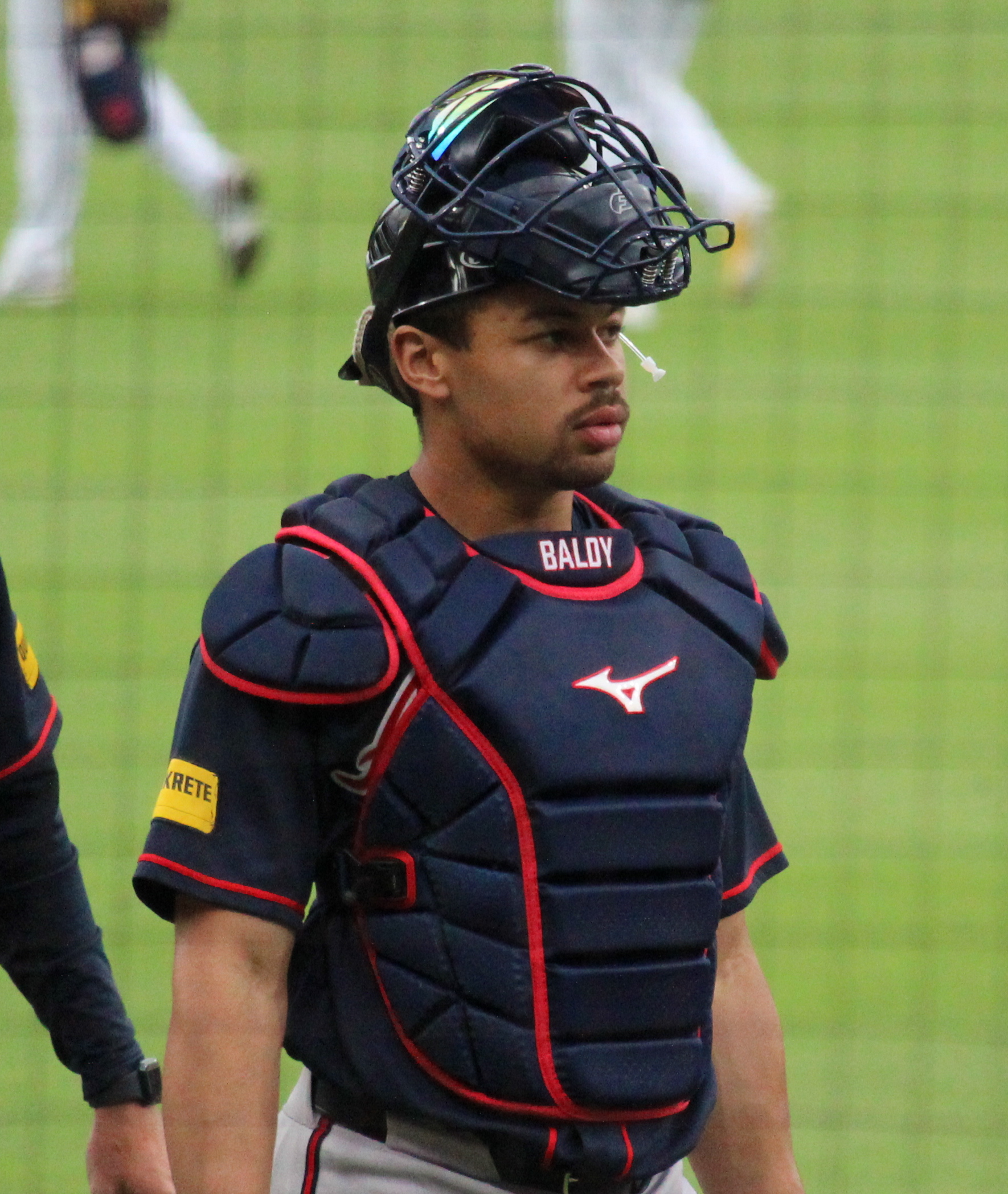
- Baldwin with the Atlanta Braves in 2026

Atlanta Braves – No. 30
- Catcher
- Born: March 28, 2001 (age 25); Madison, Wisconsin, U.S.
- Bats: Left Throws: Right

MLB debut
- March 27, 2025, for the Atlanta Braves

MLB statistics (through 2026 season)
- Batting average: .280
- Home runs: 44
- Runs batted in: 159
- Stats at Baseball Reference

Teams
- Atlanta Braves (2025–present)

Career highlights and awards
- All-Star (2026); NL Rookie of the Year (2025)
Medals
Men's baseball
Representing United States
WBSC Premier12
Bronze medal – third place	2024 Tokyo	Team

Drake Randall Baldwin (born March 28, 2001) is an American professional baseball catcher for the Atlanta Braves of Major League Baseball (MLB).

Baldwin played college baseball at Missouri State University and was selected by the Braves in the third round of the 2022 MLB draft. He made his MLB debut in 2025, in which year he won NL Rookie of the Year. Baldwin was named to his first All-Star game in 2026.

== Amateur career ==
Baldwin attended Madison West High School in Madison, Wisconsin, where he played baseball and ice hockey. As a junior in 2018, he led the state of Wisconsin with 43 goals scored. In hockey, Baldwin was a center and left wing.

Baldwin enrolled at Missouri State University to play college baseball for the Missouri State Bears. He played in 17 games during a shortened season in 2020, and then played 43 games in 2021, batting .291 with four home runs and 24 RBI. During the summer of 2020, he played in the Northwoods League for the K-Town Bobbers, returning in 2021 to play for the Madison Mallards, where he batted .316 with four home runs over 52 games. Baldwin became a strong prospect for the upcoming draft as a junior in 2022, in which he hit .341 with 19 home runs and 70 runs batted in over 60 games.

== Professional career ==
Baldwin was selected by the Atlanta Braves in the third round with the 96th overall pick of the 2022 Major League Baseball draft.

Baldwin made his professional debut in 2022 with the rookie-level Florida Complex League Braves and also played with the Single-A Augusta GreenJackets, hitting .258 over 24 games. He opened the 2023 season with the High-A Rome Braves, was promoted to the Double-A Mississippi Braves in late August, before later being promoted to the Triple-A Gwinnett Stripers in September. Over 109 appearances split between the three affiliates, Baldwin slashed .270/.384/.460 with 16 home runs and 61 RBI. He opened the 2024 season with Mississippi and was promoted to Gwinnett in June. Baldwin was selected to represent the Braves in the All-Star Futures Game at Globe Life Field. Over 124 games between the two teams, he hit .276 with 16 home runs and 88 RBIs. After the minor league regular season ended, Baldwin was named to the preliminary roster of the Arizona Fall League's Peoria Javelinas, and to the United States's roster for the 2024 WBSC Premier12.

On March 21, 2025, the Braves selected Baldwin's contract after he made the team's Opening Day roster. He made his MLB debut on Opening Day as Atlanta's starting catcher. Baldwin recorded his first MLB hit on March 29, a single off San Diego Padres pitcher Randy Vásquez. He hit his first major league home run on April 16, against Toronto Blue Jays reliever Jeff Hoffman at Rogers Centre. Baldwin finished his rookie campaign slashing .274/.341/.469 with 19 home runs and 80 RBI across 124 games. On November 10, he was named the National League Rookie of the Year.

In 2026, Baldwin was selected to his first All-Star Game. He finished the season having appeared in 138 games and batted .284 with 25 home runs and 79 RBI. Baldwin made his first ever MLB postseason appearance on September 29, leading off for the Braves in Game 1 of the 2026 National League Wild Card Series.

== Personal life ==
Baldwin's mother Bridgette is a teacher.

== See also ==
- List of Atlanta Braves award winners and league leaders

Awards and achievements
Preceded by Luisangel Acuña	National League Rookie of the Month; May 2025	Succeeded by Jacob Misiorowski
