= Major League Baseball Rookie of the Month Award =

Monthly award in Major League Baseball

- Sport: Baseball
- League: Major League Baseball
- Awarded for: Best rookie of the month in National League and American League
- Country: United States, Canada

History
- First award: 2001
- Most wins: Four, shared by: Ichiro Suzuki (2001); Mike Trout (2012); Aaron Judge (2017)
- Most recent: September 2026: Carter Jensen (AL); Cole Carrigg (NL)

Major League Baseball (MLB) honors its best rookies with a Rookie of the Month Award for one player in the American League (AL) and one in the National League (NL) during each month of the regular season. These awards have been issued since 2001, with players at all positions eligible.

== Awards by month ==
The below tables list the winners in each league since the award was established in 2001.

In two instances, the award has been shared by players for the same month: Josh Johnson and Dan Uggla for June 2006 in the National League (NL); and Ben Revere and Jemile Weeks for June 2011 in the American League (AL).

Out of a possible six months during a player's rookie season, the most times a player has been named Rookie of the Month is four, achieved by Ichiro Suzuki (2001, AL), Mike Trout (2012, AL), and Aaron Judge (2017, AL). Three-time winners have been Jason Bay (2004, NL), José Abreu (2014, AL), Juan Soto (2018, NL), Pete Alonso (2019, NL), and Yordan Alvarez (2019, AL). A number of players have won it twice.

The majority of players named Rookie of the Year were also recognized as a Rookie of the Month at least once since the latter was established. The exceptions have been Huston Street (2005, AL), Hanley Ramírez (2006, NL), Michael Fulmer (2016, AL), Kyle Lewis (2020, AL), Devin Williams (2020, NL), and Randy Arozarena (2021, AL).

In the below tables, a name in italics indicates the player was later named Rookie of the Year for his league.

=== American League ===
Year	Month	Player(s)	Team(s)
2001	April	Ichiro Suzuki	Seattle Mariners
2001	May	Ichiro Suzuki (2)	Seattle Mariners
2001	June	Josh Towers	Baltimore Orioles
2001	July	CC Sabathia	Cleveland Indians
2001	August	Ichiro Suzuki (3)	Seattle Mariners
2001	September	Ichiro Suzuki (4)	Seattle Mariners
2002	April	Carlos Peña	Oakland Athletics
2002	May	Ryan Drese	Cleveland Indians
2002	June	Eric Hinske	Toronto Blue Jays
2002	July	Rodrigo Lopez	Baltimore Orioles
2002	August	Josh Phelps	Toronto Blue Jays
2002	September	Josh Phelps (2)	Toronto Blue Jays
2003	April	Rocco Baldelli	Tampa Bay Devil Rays
2003	May	Rocco Baldelli (2)	Tampa Bay Devil Rays
2003	June	Hideki Matsui	New York Yankees
2003	July	Ángel Berroa	Kansas City Royals
2003	August	Rafael Soriano	Seattle Mariners
2003	September	Reed Johnson	Toronto Blue Jays
2004	April	Gerald Laird	Texas Rangers
2004	May	Kevin Youkilis	Boston Red Sox
2004	June	Bobby Crosby	Oakland Athletics
2004	July	Robb Quinlan	Anaheim Angels
2004	August	Frank Francisco	Texas Rangers
2004	September	Ross Gload	Chicago White Sox
2005	April	Gustavo Chacín	Toronto Blue Jays
2005	May	Damon Hollins	Tampa Bay Devil Rays
2005	June	Joe Blanton	Oakland Athletics
2005	July	Gustavo Chacín (2)	Toronto Blue Jays
2005	August	Joe Blanton (2)	Oakland Athletics
2005	September	Robinson Canó	New York Yankees
2006	April	Jonathan Papelbon	Boston Red Sox
2006	May	Justin Verlander	Detroit Tigers
2006	June	Francisco Liriano	Minnesota Twins
2006	July	Francisco Liriano (2)	Minnesota Twins
2006	August	Nick Markakis	Baltimore Orioles
2006	September	Boof Bonser	Minnesota Twins
2007	April	Hideki Okajima	Boston Red Sox
2007	May	Dustin Pedroia	Boston Red Sox
2007	June	Brian Bannister	Kansas City Royals
2007	July	Billy Butler	Kansas City Royals
2007	August	Brian Bannister (2)	Kansas City Royals
2007	September	Jacoby Ellsbury	Boston Red Sox
2008	April	David Murphy	Texas Rangers
2008	May	Aaron Laffey	Cleveland Indians
2008	June	Evan Longoria	Tampa Bay Rays
2008	July	Chris Davis	Texas Rangers
2008	August	Alexei Ramírez	Chicago White Sox
2008	September	Scott Lewis	Cleveland Indians
2009	April	Scott Richmond	Toronto Blue Jays
2009	May	Rick Porcello	Detroit Tigers
2009	June	Nolan Reimold	Baltimore Orioles
2009	July	Gordon Beckham	Chicago White Sox
2009	August	Andrew Bailey	Oakland Athletics
2009	September	Brett Anderson	Oakland Athletics
2010	April	Austin Jackson	Detroit Tigers
2010	May	Brennan Boesch	Detroit Tigers
2010	June	Brennan Boesch (2)	Detroit Tigers
2010	July	Wade Davis	Tampa Bay Rays
2010	August	Brian Matusz	Baltimore Orioles
2010	September	Neftalí Feliz	Texas Rangers
2011	April	Michael Pineda	Seattle Mariners
2011	May	Jeremy Hellickson	Tampa Bay Rays
2011	June	Ben Revere; Jemile Weeks	Minnesota Twins; Oakland Athletics
2011	July	Eric Hosmer	Kansas City Royals
2011	August	Mike Carp	Seattle Mariners
2011	September	Eric Hosmer (2)	Kansas City Royals
2012	April	Yu Darvish	Texas Rangers
2012	May	Mike Trout	Los Angeles Angels of Anaheim
2012	June	Mike Trout (2)	Los Angeles Angels of Anaheim
2012	July	Mike Trout (3)	Los Angeles Angels of Anaheim
2012	August	Mike Trout (4)	Los Angeles Angels of Anaheim
2012	September	Yoenis Céspedes	Oakland Athletics
2013	April	Justin Grimm	Texas Rangers
2013	May	Nate Freiman	Oakland Athletics
2013	June	José Iglesias	Boston Red Sox
2013	July	Chris Archer	Tampa Bay Rays
2013	August	Martín Pérez	Texas Rangers
2013	September	Wil Myers	Tampa Bay Rays
2014	April	José Abreu	Chicago White Sox
2014	May	George Springer	Houston Astros
2014	June	José Abreu (2)	Chicago White Sox
2014	July	José Abreu (3)	Chicago White Sox
2014	August	Matt Shoemaker	Los Angeles Angels of Anaheim
2014	September	Collin McHugh	Houston Astros
2015	April	Devon Travis	Toronto Blue Jays
2015	May	Delino DeShields, Jr.	Texas Rangers
2015	June	Carlos Correa	Houston Astros
2015	July	Andrew Heaney	Los Angeles Angels of Anaheim
2015	August	Miguel Sano	Minnesota Twins
2015	September	Francisco Lindor	Cleveland Indians
2016	April	Nomar Mazara	Texas Rangers
2016	May	Nomar Mazara (2)	Texas Rangers
2016	June	Tyler Naquin	Cleveland Indians
2016	July	Tyler Naquin (2)	Cleveland Indians
2016	August	Gary Sánchez	New York Yankees
2016	September	Ryon Healy	Oakland Athletics
2017	April	Aaron Judge	New York Yankees
2017	May	Aaron Judge (2)	New York Yankees
2017	June	Aaron Judge (3)	New York Yankees
2017	July	Yuli Gurriel	Houston Astros
2017	August	Andrew Benintendi	Boston Red Sox
2017	September	Aaron Judge (4)	New York Yankees
2018	April	Shohei Ohtani	Los Angeles Angels
2018	May	Gleyber Torres	New York Yankees
2018	June	Miguel Andujar	New York Yankees
2018	July	Lourdes Gurriel Jr.	Toronto Blue Jays
2018	August	Miguel Andujar (2)	New York Yankees
2018	September	Shohei Ohtani (2)	Los Angeles Angels
2019	April	Brandon Lowe	Tampa Bay Rays
2019	May	Michael Chavis	Boston Red Sox
2019	June	Yordan Alvarez	Houston Astros
2019	July	Yordan Alvarez (2)	Houston Astros
2019	August	Yordan Alvarez (3)	Houston Astros
2019	September	Eloy Jiménez	Chicago White Sox
2020	July/August	Luis Robert	Chicago White Sox
2020	September	Jared Walsh	Los Angeles Angels
2021	April	Yermín Mercedes	Chicago White Sox
2021	May	Adolis García	Texas Rangers
2021	June	Ryan Mountcastle	Baltimore Orioles
2021	July	Eric Haase	Detroit Tigers
2021	August	Bobby Dalbec	Boston Red Sox
2021	September	Alek Manoah	Toronto Blue Jays
2022	April	Steven Kwan	Cleveland Guardians
2022	May	Julio Rodríguez	Seattle Mariners
2022	June	Julio Rodríguez (2)	Seattle Mariners
2022	July	José Miranda	Minnesota Twins
2022	August	George Kirby	Seattle Mariners
2022	September	Steven Kwan (2)	Cleveland Guardians
2023	April	Josh Jung	Texas Rangers
2023	May	Josh Jung (2)	Texas Rangers
2023	June	Gunnar Henderson	Baltimore Orioles
2023	July	Triston Casas	Boston Red Sox
2023	August	Zack Gelof	Oakland Athletics
2023	September	Royce Lewis	Minnesota Twins
2024	April	Colton Cowser	Baltimore Orioles
2024	May	Luis Gil	New York Yankees
2024	June	Wyatt Langford	Texas Rangers
2024	July	Colt Keith	Detroit Tigers
2024	August	Spencer Arrighetti	Houston Astros
2024	September	Wyatt Langford (2)	Texas Rangers
2025	April	Kristian Campbell	Boston Red Sox
2025	May	Jacob Wilson	Athletics
2025	June	Nick Kurtz	Athletics
2025	July	Nick Kurtz (2)	Athletics
2025	August	Roman Anthony	Boston Red Sox
2025	September	Joey Cantillo	Cleveland Guardians
2026	April	Kevin McGonigle	Detroit Tigers
2026	May	Munetaka Murakami	Chicago White Sox
2026	June	Kazuma Okamoto	Toronto Blue Jays
2026	July	Chase DeLauter	Cleveland Guardians
2026	August	Tristan Peters	Chicago White Sox
2026	September	Carter Jensen	Kansas City Royals

=== National League ===
Year	Month	Player(s)	Team(s)
2001	April	Albert Pujols	St. Louis Cardinals
2001	May	Albert Pujols (2)	St. Louis Cardinals
2001	June	Ben Sheets	Milwaukee Brewers
2001	July	Pedro Feliz	San Francisco Giants
2001	August	Roy Oswalt	Houston Astros
2001	September	Bud Smith	St. Louis Cardinals
2002	April	Kazuhisa Ishii	Los Angeles Dodgers
2002	May	Austin Kearns	Cincinnati Reds
2002	June	Jason Simontacchi	St. Louis Cardinals
2002	July	Kirk Saarloos	Houston Astros
2002	August	Jason Jennings	Colorado Rockies
2002	September	Endy Chávez	Montreal Expos
2003	April	Hee-seop Choi	Chicago Cubs
2003	May	Xavier Nady	San Diego Padres
2003	June	Dontrelle Willis	Florida Marlins
2003	July	Miguel Cabrera	Florida Marlins
2003	August	Scott Podsednik	Milwaukee Brewers
2003	September	Miguel Cabrera (2)	Florida Marlins
2004	April	Khalil Greene	San Diego Padres
2004	May	Terrmel Sledge	Montreal Expos
2004	June	Jason Bay	Pittsburgh Pirates
2004	July	Jason Bay (2)	Pittsburgh Pirates
2004	August	Khalil Greene (2)	San Diego Padres
2004	September	Jason Bay (3)	Pittsburgh Pirates
2005	April	Clint Barmes	Colorado Rockies
2005	May	Ryan Church	Washington Nationals
2005	June	Garrett Atkins	Colorado Rockies
2005	July	Zach Duke	Pittsburgh Pirates
2005	August	Zach Duke (2)	Pittsburgh Pirates
2005	September	Ryan Howard	Philadelphia Phillies
2006	April	Prince Fielder	Milwaukee Brewers
2006	May	Josh Johnson	Florida Marlins
2006	June	Josh Johnson (2); Dan Uggla	Florida Marlins
2006	July	Josh Barfield	San Diego Padres
2006	August	Chris Duncan	St. Louis Cardinals
2006	September	Aníbal Sánchez	Florida Marlins
2007	April	Josh Hamilton	Cincinnati Reds
2007	May	Hunter Pence	Houston Astros
2007	June	Ryan Braun	Milwaukee Brewers
2007	July	Ryan Braun (2)	Milwaukee Brewers
2007	August	Troy Tulowitzki	Colorado Rockies
2007	September	James Loney	Los Angeles Dodgers
2008	April	Geovany Soto	Chicago Cubs
2008	May	Blake DeWitt	Los Angeles Dodgers
2008	June	Jair Jurrjens	Atlanta Braves
2008	July	Ian Stewart	Colorado Rockies
2008	August	Geovany Soto (2)	Chicago Cubs
2008	September	Joey Votto	Cincinnati Reds
2009	April	Brian Barden	St. Louis Cardinals
2009	May	Gerardo Parra	Arizona Diamondbacks
2009	June	Tommy Hanson	Atlanta Braves
2009	July	Garrett Jones	Pittsburgh Pirates
2009	August	Chris Coghlan	Florida Marlins
2009	September	Casey McGehee	Milwaukee Brewers
2010	April	Jason Heyward	Atlanta Braves
2010	May	Jason Heyward (2)	Atlanta Braves
2010	June	Gaby Sánchez	Florida Marlins
2010	July	Buster Posey	San Francisco Giants
2010	August	Daniel Hudson	Arizona Diamondbacks
2010	September	Pedro Alvarez	Pittsburgh Pirates
2011	April	Darwin Barney	Chicago Cubs
2011	May	Justin Turner	New York Mets
2011	June	Craig Kimbrel	Atlanta Braves
2011	July	Freddie Freeman	Atlanta Braves
2011	August	Craig Kimbrel (2)	Atlanta Braves
2011	September	Dee Gordon	Los Angeles Dodgers
2012	April	Wade Miley	Arizona Diamondbacks
2012	May	Bryce Harper	Washington Nationals
2012	June	Andrelton Simmons	Atlanta Braves
2012	July	Anthony Rizzo	Chicago Cubs
2012	August	Todd Frazier	Cincinnati Reds
2012	September	Bryce Harper (2)	Washington Nationals
2013	April	Evan Gattis	Atlanta Braves
2013	May	Evan Gattis (2)	Atlanta Braves
2013	June	Yasiel Puig	Los Angeles Dodgers
2013	July	José Fernández	Miami Marlins
2013	August	José Fernández (2)	Miami Marlins
2013	September	Gerrit Cole	Pittsburgh Pirates
2014	April	Chris Owings	Arizona Diamondbacks
2014	May	Kolten Wong	St. Louis Cardinals
2014	June	Billy Hamilton	Cincinnati Reds
2014	July	Jacob deGrom	New York Mets
2014	August	Kyle Hendricks	Chicago Cubs
2014	September	Jacob deGrom (2)	New York Mets
2015	April	Alex Guerrero	Los Angeles Dodgers
2015	May	Kris Bryant	Chicago Cubs
2015	June	Maikel Franco	Philadelphia Phillies
2015	July	Jung-ho Kang	Pittsburgh Pirates
2015	August	Kris Bryant (2)	Chicago Cubs
2015	September	Justin Bour	Miami Marlins
2016	April	Trevor Story	Colorado Rockies
2016	May	Steven Matz	New York Mets
2016	June	Corey Seager	Los Angeles Dodgers
2016	July	Ryan Schimpf	San Diego Padres
2016	August	Trea Turner	Washington Nationals
2016	September	Trea Turner (2)	Washington Nationals
2017	April	Antonio Senzatela	Colorado Rockies
2017	May	Cody Bellinger	Los Angeles Dodgers
2017	June	Cody Bellinger (2)	Los Angeles Dodgers
2017	July	Paul DeJong	St. Louis Cardinals
2017	August	Rhys Hoskins	Philadelphia Phillies
2017	September	José Martínez	St. Louis Cardinals
2018	April	Christian Villanueva	San Diego Padres
2018	May	Austin Meadows	Pittsburgh Pirates
2018	June	Juan Soto	Washington Nationals
2018	July	Juan Soto (2)	Washington Nationals
2018	August	Ronald Acuña Jr.	Atlanta Braves
2018	September	Juan Soto (3)	Washington Nationals
2019	April	Pete Alonso	New York Mets
2019	May	Austin Riley	Atlanta Braves
2019	June	Pete Alonso (2)	New York Mets
2019	July	Keston Hiura	Milwaukee Brewers
2019	August	Aristides Aquino	Cincinnati Reds
2019	September	Pete Alonso (3)	New York Mets
2020	July/August	Jake Cronenworth	San Diego Padres
2020	September	Ke'Bryan Hayes	Pittsburgh Pirates
2021	April	Trevor Rogers	Miami Marlins
2021	May	Trevor Rogers (2)	Miami Marlins
2021	June	Patrick Wisdom	Chicago Cubs
2021	July	Jonathan India	Cincinnati Reds
2021	August	Frank Schwindel	Chicago Cubs
2021	September	Frank Schwindel (2)	Chicago Cubs
2022	April	Seiya Suzuki	Chicago Cubs
2022	May	Luis González	San Francisco Giants
2022	June	Michael Harris II	Atlanta Braves
2022	July	Spencer Strider	Atlanta Braves
2022	August	Michael Harris II (2)	Atlanta Braves
2022	September	Michael Harris II (3)	Atlanta Braves
2023	April	James Outman	Los Angeles Dodgers
2023	May	Spencer Steer	Cincinnati Reds
2023	June	Corbin Carroll	Arizona Diamondbacks
2023	July	Francisco Álvarez	New York Mets
2023	August	James Outman (2)	Los Angeles Dodgers
2023	September	Nolan Jones	Colorado Rockies
2024	April	Shōta Imanaga	Chicago Cubs
2024	May	Joey Ortiz	Milwaukee Brewers
2024	June	Jackson Merrill	San Diego Padres
2024	July	Tyler Fitzgerald	San Francisco Giants
2024	August	Jackson Merrill (2)	San Diego Padres
2024	September	Paul Skenes	Pittsburgh Pirates
2025	April	Luisangel Acuña	New York Mets
2025	May	Drake Baldwin	Atlanta Braves
2025	June	Jacob Misiorowski	Milwaukee Brewers
2025	July	Isaac Collins	Milwaukee Brewers
2025	August	Jakob Marsee	Miami Marlins
2025	September	Daylen Lile	Washington Nationals
2026	April	Sal Stewart	Cincinnati Reds
2026	May	T. J. Rumfield	Colorado Rockies
2026	June	T. J. Rumfield (2)	Colorado Rockies
2026	July	Esmerlyn Valdez	Pittsburgh Pirates
2026	August	Sal Stewart (2)	Cincinnati Reds
2026	September	Cole Carrigg	Colorado Rockies

== See also ==
- Baseball awards
- List of MLB awards
