= Toshiki Kurobane =

Japanese baseball player (born 1987)

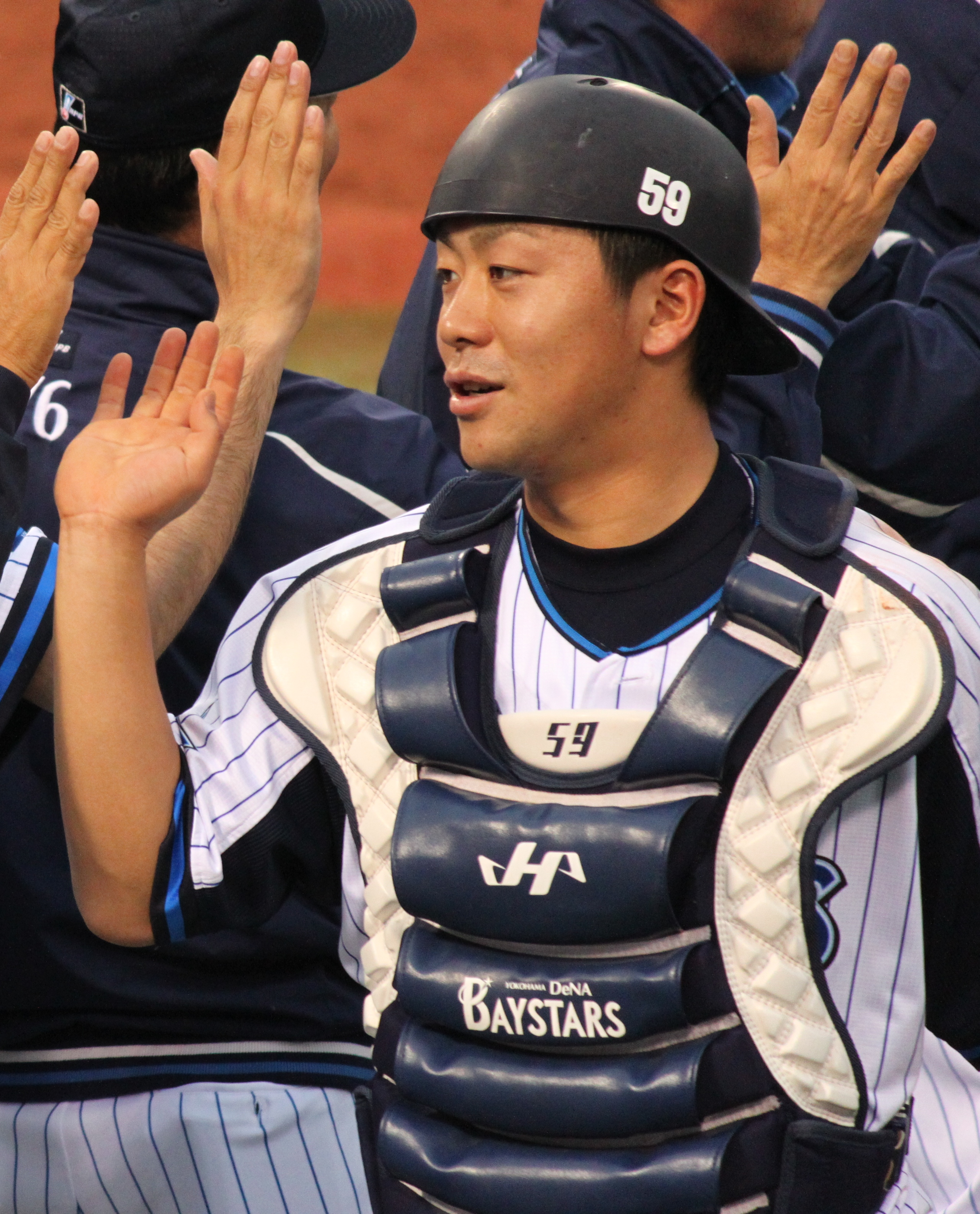
- Kurobane with the Yokohama DeNA BayStars
- Catcher
- Born: June 2, 1987 (age 38); Yokohama, Kanagawa, Japan
- Bats: Right Throws: Right

debut
- May 25, 2008, for the Yokohama BayStars

Career statistics
- Batting average: .214
- Home runs: 6
- Runs batted in: 50
- Stats at Baseball Reference

Teams
- Yokohama BayStars/Yokohama DeNA BayStars (2006–2017); Hokkaido Nippon-Ham Fighters (2017–2020)

Toshiki Kurobane (黒羽根 利規, Kurobane Toshiki; born June 2, 1987) is a Japanese former professional baseball catcher who played in Nippon Professional Baseball (NPB) for the Yokohama BayStars/Yokohama DeNA BayStars and Hokkaido Nippon-Ham Fighters.

== Career ==
Yokohama BayStars selected Kurobane with the third selection in the 2005 NPB draft.

On May 25, 2008, Kurobane made his NPB debut.

On December 2, 2020, he become a free agent.
