= La Sabana =

Coordinates: 27°52′S 59°57′W

- Municipality and village
- Interactive map of La Sabana
- Country: Argentina
- Province: Chaco Province
- Time zone: UTC−3 (ART)

La Sabana is a village and municipality in Chaco Province in northern Argentina.
