= Luisangel Acuña =

Venezuelan baseball player (born 2002)

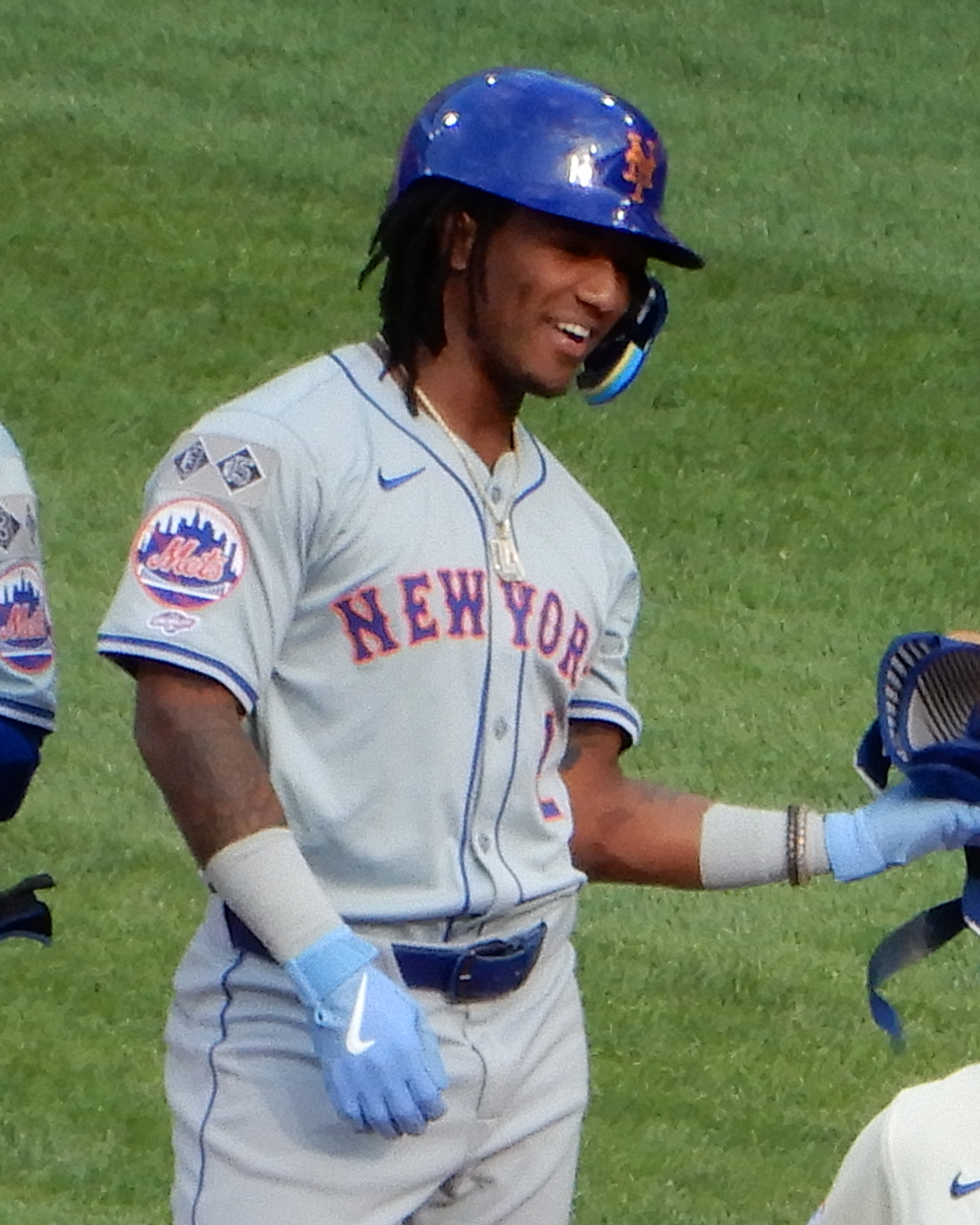
- Acuña with the Mets in 2024

Chicago White Sox – No. 0
- Utility player
- Born: March 12, 2002 (age 24); Caracas, Venezuela
- Bats: Right Throws: Right

MLB debut
- September 14, 2024, for the New York Mets

MLB statistics (through 2026 season)
- Batting average: .238
- Home runs: 5
- Runs batted in: 27
- Stats at Baseball Reference

Teams
- New York Mets (2024–2025); Chicago White Sox (2026–present)

Luisangel José Acuña (born March 12, 2002) is a Venezuelan professional baseball utility player for the Chicago White Sox of Major League Baseball (MLB). He has previously played in MLB for the New York Mets. He made his MLB debut in 2024.

== Career ==
=== Texas Rangers ===
Acuña grew up in La Sabana, Venezuela. Acuña had agreed in principle to sign with the Atlanta Braves in 2017, but due to the Braves international signing scandal, Atlanta was stripped of its ability to pay his signing bonus and he returned to the open market. On July 2, 2018, Acuña signed with the Texas Rangers for a $425,000 signing bonus.

Acuña made his professional debut with the DSL Rangers of the rookie-level Dominican Summer League in 2019, hitting .342/.438/.455 with two home runs, 29 runs batted in (RBIs), and 17 stolen bases, and was named to the DSL All-Star team. He did not play in any games in 2020 due to the cancellation of the minor league season because of the COVID-19 pandemic.

Acuña spent the 2021 season with the Down East Wood Ducks of the Low-A East. Over 111 games, he hit .266/.345/.404 with 12 home runs, 74 RBIs, and 44 stolen bases. Acuña was named the Rangers 2021 minor league Defender of the Year. Acuña opened the 2022 season with the Hickory Crawdads of the High-A South Atlantic League, hitting .317/.417/.483 with eight home runs, 29 RBIs, and 28 stolen bases over 54 games. He was promoted to the Frisco RoughRiders of the Double-A Texas League on August 2 and finished the season after hitting .224/.302/.349 with three home runs, 18 RBIs, and 13 stolen bases for Frisco. Acuña played for the Surprise Saguaros of the Arizona Fall League following the 2022 season, and was named to the Fall League All-Star team.

On November 15, 2022, the Rangers added Acuña to their 40-man roster to protect him from the Rule 5 draft. Acuña was optioned back to Frisco to begin the 2023 season.

=== New York Mets ===
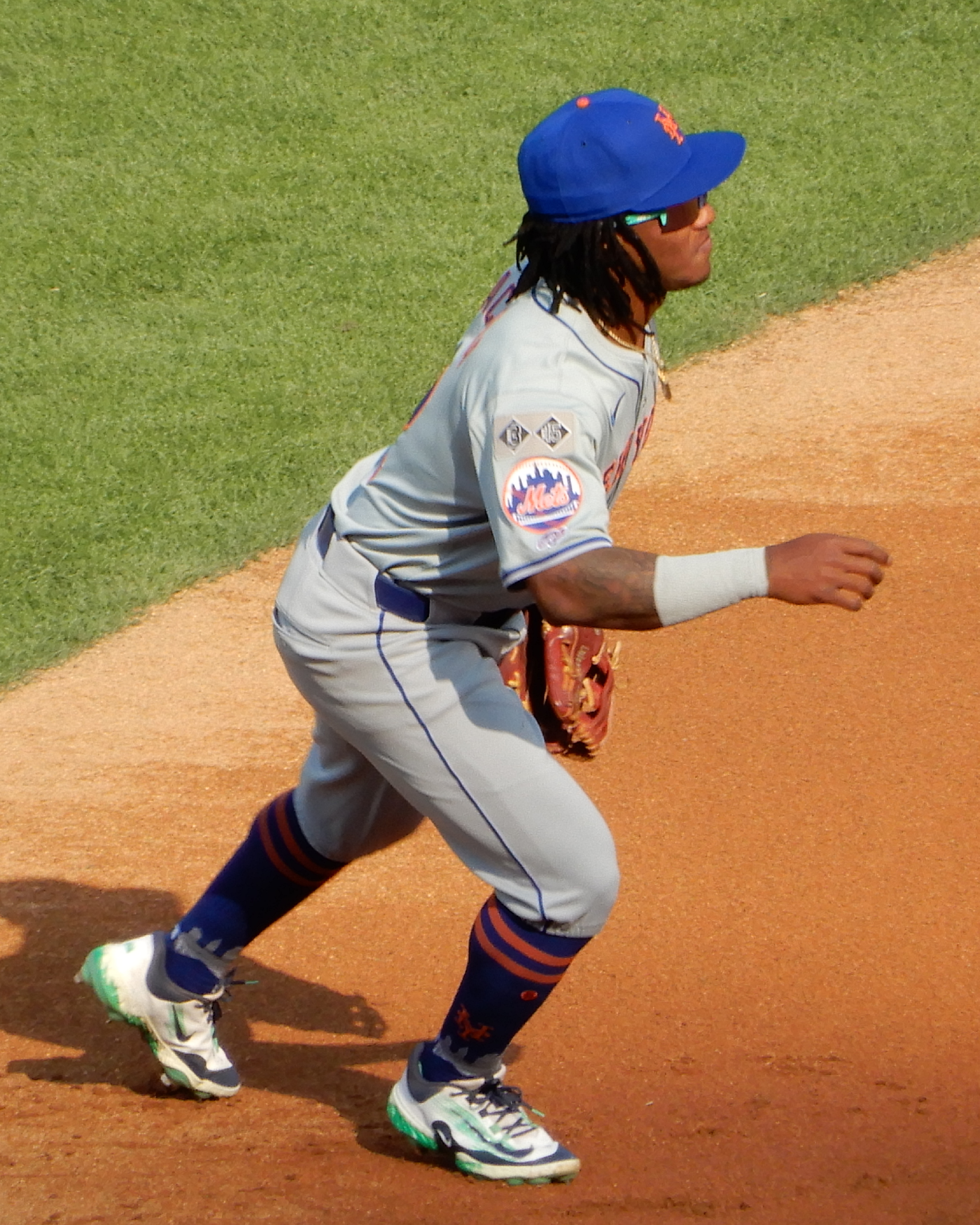
Acuña with the Mets in 2024

On July 30, 2023, the Rangers traded Acuña to the New York Mets in exchange for Max Scherzer and cash considerations. In 37 games, he batted .243/.317/.304 with 2 home runs, 12 RBI, and 15 stolen bases. Acuña began the 2024 season with the Triple–A Syracuse Mets. In 2024, Acuña played second base, shortstop and center field, and led Syracuse in stolen bases. In 131 games for Triple–A Syracuse, he batted .258/.299/.355 with seven home runs and 50 RBI.

On September 14, 2024, the Mets promoted Acuña to the major leagues and he made his major league debut the same day against the Philadelphia Phillies. He recorded his first major league hit, a single to center field off of pitcher Taijuan Walker in the fourth inning. On September 17, during a game against the Washington Nationals, Acuña hit his first major league home run off of pitcher Joe La Sorsa, leading the Mets to a 10–1 victory. In 2024, Acuña appeared in 14 games for the Mets, batting .308/.325/.641 with three home runs and six RBI. He played in 10 games of the Mets 2024 postseason run, where he recorded zero hits in three at bats.

Acuña was named to the Mets' Opening Day roster for the 2025 season. By the end of April, he was slashing .288/.342/.356 with a .698 OPS, 13 runs scored, 3 RBI, and 7 stolen bases. On May 2, Acuña was rewarded with the National League Rookie of the Month Award for April for the first time in his career. However, on June 23, Acuna was demoted to Triple-A Syracuse. In 2025, Acuña appeared in 95 games for the Mets, batting .234/.293/.274 with zero home runs, eight RBI, and 16 stolen bases. He led the National League with a 94.1 stolen base percentage.

On January 10, 2026, Acuña became the first player in Venezuelan Winter League history to hit four home runs in a game, fueling the Cardenales de Lara to a 21–9 victory over the Bravos de Margarita.

=== Chicago White Sox ===
On January 20, 2026, the Mets traded Acuña and Truman Pauley to the Chicago White Sox in exchange for Luis Robert Jr. In 2026, Acuña appeared in 103 games for the White Sox, batting .229/.261/.276 with two home runs, 13 RBI, and 18 stolen bases. Among center fielders, he committed the 3rd-most errors in the American League.

== Personal life ==
Acuña comes from a baseball family. His brother, Ronald Acuña Jr., is an outfielder for the Atlanta Braves. His father, Ronald Sr., played in minor league baseball for three organizations, and, in 2022, his younger brother Bryan was signed by the Minnesota Twins. He also has another brother, 15-year-old Kenny, who has a verbal agreement to be signed by the Philadelphia Phillies once he becomes eligible.

Awards and achievements
Preceded by Paul Skenes	National League Rookie of the Month; April 2025	Succeeded by Drake Baldwin
