= Kelvim Escobar =

Venezuelan baseball player (born 1976)

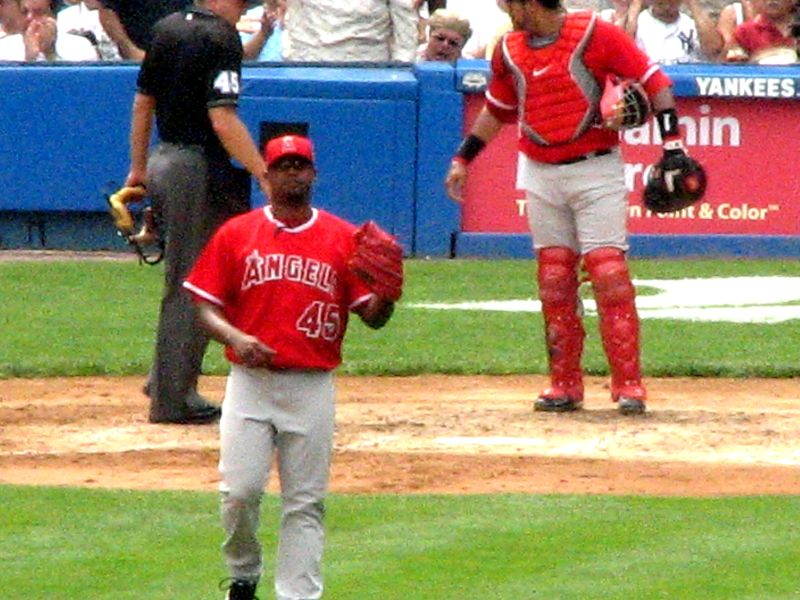
- Escobar with the Los Angeles Angels of Anaheim
- Pitcher
- Born: April 11, 1976 (age 50); La Guaira, Venezuela
- Batted: Right Threw: Right

MLB debut
- June 29, 1997, for the Toronto Blue Jays

Last MLB appearance
- June 6, 2009, for the Los Angeles Angels of Anaheim

MLB statistics
- Win–loss record: 101–91
- Earned run average: 4.15
- Strikeouts: 1,310
- Stats at Baseball Reference

Teams
- Toronto Blue Jays (1997–2003); Anaheim Angels / Los Angeles Angels of Anaheim (2004–2007, 2009)

Kelvim José Escobar Bolívar (born April 11, 1976) is a Venezuelan former professional baseball pitcher. He played for the Toronto Blue Jays (1997–2003) and Los Angeles Angels of Anaheim (2004–2007, 2009). He won 101 games, but his career was cut short by shoulder injuries.

== Career ==
=== Toronto Blue Jays ===
Escobar signed as an amateur free agent with the Toronto Blue Jays in 1992. He was rated the 2nd best prospect in the Florida State League in 1996. He was also rated the 4th best prospect in the Blue Jays organization in 1996. Escobar made his major league debut on June 29, 1997 coming up as a reliever. He was able to save 14 games. For the next five seasons, he was being switched in and out of the bullpen. Over that period he had a record of 42–44 with 40 saves. In 2001, he became second on the Blue Jays all-time single season saves list with 38 saves. The Blue Jays finally established him as a starter in 2003. He started off 5–6 before the All-Star and 8–3 after the All-Star break. He finished the season with a 13–9 record with 159 strikeouts and a 4.29 ERA.

=== Los Angeles Angels of Anaheim ===
Escobar signed a three-year, $18.75 million contract with the Angels as a free agent before the 2004 season. He was slotted in as the Angels' second starter in 2004 going 11–12 with a 3.93 ERA. In 2005, he was hampered by injuries that allowed him to only start 7 games in 16 appearances. He went 3–2. In 2006, he went 11–14, with a 3.61 ERA. He was re-signed to a three-year $28.5 million deal with the Angels. In 2007. his breakout year with the Angels, he went 18–7 with a 3.40 ERA. During spring training of 2008, it was discovered that Escobar had a right shoulder injury that required season-ending surgery. He missed the entire 2008 season and made one start in 2009.

=== New York Mets ===
On December 28, 2009, Escobar signed a 1-year contract with the New York Mets. This gave him a $1.25 million base salary, with up to $3 million total in incentives based on games pitched. Escobar tore his capsule in his right shoulder before he threw a pitch for the Mets, and did not appear in any major or minor league games for the franchise.

=== Milwaukee Brewers ===
On January 10, 2013, Escobar signed a minor league contract with the Milwaukee Brewers after a strong showing in the Venezuelan Winter League. Escobar was invited to Spring training, and was released on March 10, 2013, having made only one appearance in the Cactus League. Five days prior, he was diagnosed with a nerve impingement above his right hand that had not shown any improvement up to his release.

=== Olmecas de Tabasco ===
On March 21, 2013, Escobar signed with the Olmecas de Tabasco of the Mexican League. He was released on April 9. In 2 starts 5 innings he struggled immensely going 0-1 with a 7.20 ERA with more walks (6) than strikeouts (4).

== Pitching style ==
Escobar threw a 93–95 mph four-seam fastball, a 90–92 mph two-seamer, and a deceptive 83–85 mph changeup. He had good command of a wide variety of other pitches, including a 79–83 mph curve, and the occasional 86–88 slider or 85–87 mph splitter.

== Personal life ==
Shortstop Alcides Escobar, who played in MLB, is his first cousin.

== See also ==
- List of Major League Baseball players from Venezuela
