= Sport in Venezuela =

The major sports in Venezuela are baseball, basketball and football/soccer. Baseball in Venezuela originates with the early 20th century cultural influence of the United States oil companies. The Venezuelan Professional Baseball League was established in 1945. Football in Venezuela lags behind baseball, but its popularity in recent years has grown. Basketball and volleyball are also popular sports; there has been a national basketball league since 1974. The Vuelta a Venezuela is one of six cycling events in the UCI America Tour. The polo club Lechuza Caracas has had some success in North American polo competitions.

In international competitions, Venezuela has participated in the Olympics since 1948, and the Winter Olympic Games since 1998. It won its first Olympic medal in 1952 when Asnoldo Devonish won bronze in the Men's Triple Jump, and its first Olympic gold in 1968 (Francisco Rodríguez, light flyweight boxing). Venezuela first competed in the Paralympics in 1984 and won its first Paralympic gold in 2008 (Naomi Soazo, judo).

Venezuela participates in the Pan American Games and the Central American and Caribbean Games, with Caracas hosting these games in 1959 and 1983, respectively. Venezuela has had a Davis Cup team since 1957.

Though golf is a minor sport in Venezuela, the emergence of Jhonattan (Johnny) Vegas on the PGA Tour in 2011 and his strong showing as a rookie there has raised its profile.

== Baseball ==
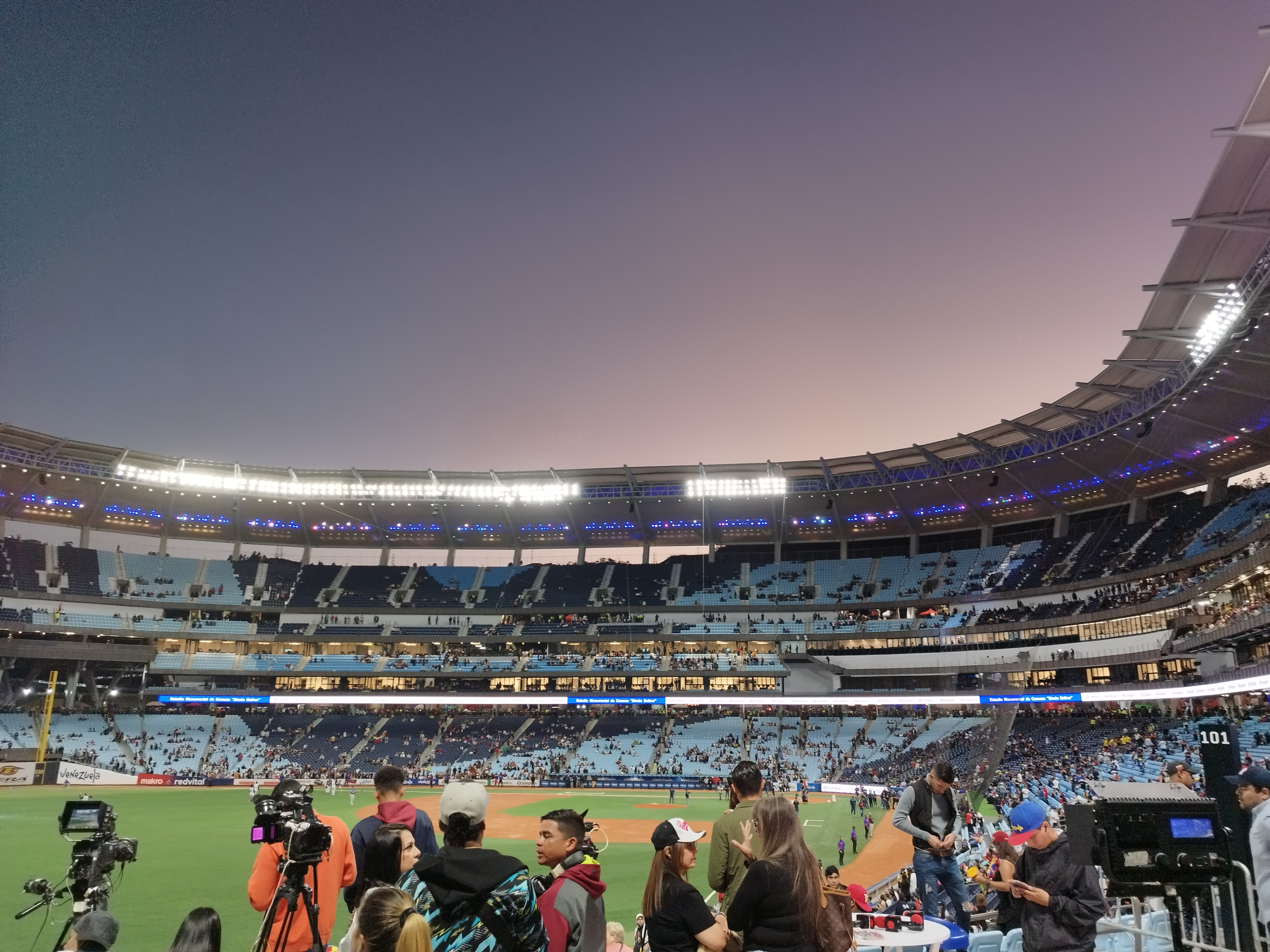
The Monumental Stadium of Caracas Simón Bolívar in Caracas, the home of the Leones del Caracas.

=== History ===
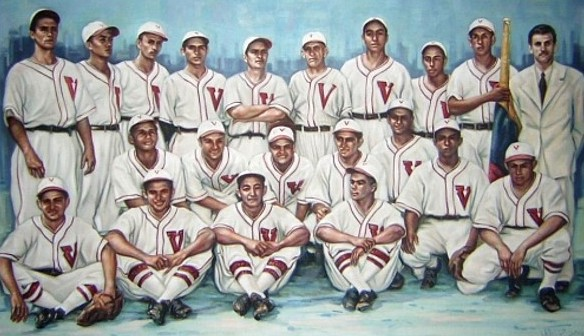
The "Heroes of '41"

On October 22, 1941, the Venezuela national baseball team defeated Cuba in the IV Amateur World Series. Since the victory was unexpected because Cuba was heavily favored, it sent the country into a craze. A week later when the team returned to Venezuela over one hundred thousand people lined up along a twenty-mile road from La Guaira to the capital to welcome them back at the time that was more than a third of the country's population. Another fact to show the magnitude of the celebration is that government offices, businesses, and schools closed down to celebrate. The players were even greeted by President Gen at the Isaías Medina Angrita and many other high power people. The defeat of Cuba was recognized as a Hazaña at the time, which means a heroic feat. Later in the year 2000, the country's association sports writers established the defeat as the country's most important sporting event of the twentieth century. Since that “heroic” moment, the major spark of the sport of baseball escalated itself to be Venezuela's dominant sport. The Venezuelan Professional Baseball League was established in 1945, with Leones del Caracas the leading team; another leading club is Valencia's Navegantes del Magallanes, established in 1917. There is a Venezuelan Summer League (established in 1997) and winter league (Liga Paralela). Venezuelan teams have won the Caribbean Series a number of times.

The Venezuela national baseball team won the Baseball World Cup several times in the 1940s, and the Baseball tournament at the Pan American Games in 1959. Venezuela has also participated in every edition of the World Baseball Classic since the inaugural event in 2006, and reached the bronze medal in 2009. By far their biggest success to date was in the 2026 World Baseball Classic, where they defeated Japan, Italy and the United States in the knockout stage en route to their first WBC title.

Venezuelan players in US-Canadian Major League Baseball number over 200 since 1939. The Luis Aparicio Award was established in 2004, in honor of Luis Aparicio, the only Venezuelan ballplayer to have been introduced into the National Baseball Hall of Fame in Cooperstown, New York. The award is given annually to honor the Venezuelan player who recorded the best individual performance in Major League Baseball, as voted on by sports journalists in Venezuela.

=== Baseball stadiums in Venezuela with a capacity of at least 10,000 ===
Stadium	Capacity	City	Tenants
Estadio Monumental de Caracas Simón Bolívar	40,000	Caracas	Leones del Caracas
Estadio La Ceiba	30,000	Ciudad Guayana	
Estadio Luis Aparicio "El Grande"	23,900	Maracaibo	Águilas del Zulia
Estadio Antonio Herrera Gutiérrez	22,000	Barquisimeto	Cardenales de Lara
Estadio Universitario	20,723	Caracas	
Stadium Nueva Esparta	18,000	Porlamar	Bravos de Margarita
Estadio Alfonso Chico Carrasquel	18,000	Puerto La Cruz	Caribes de Anzoátegui
Estadio José Bernardo Pérez	16,000	Valencia	Navegantes del Magallanes
Estadio Fórum La Guaira	14,300	Macuto	Tiburones de La Guaira
Estadio Rafael Calles Pinto	13,000	Guanare	Llaneros de Guanare
Estadio José Pérez Colmenares	12,647	Maracay	Tigres de Aragua

== Football ==
Football in Venezuela has gradually become popular and a mainstream sport with baseball, but baseball is still known as the country's sport. This is believed because of how mainstream baseball is played and the success of Venezuelan players in the MLB (Major League Baseball). Also, it's believed that the failure for football to become as popular as baseball in the country is because the national team has not done so well at international level. Venezuela is the only team to not have qualified for a World Cup in South America, excluding Suriname, Guyana and French Guiana, who, although a part of continental South America, participate in the CONCACAF qualifying region. Even though they have never qualified for the World Cup, they do play in one of the hardest brackets with some of the top football countries in the world, such as Brazil and Argentina.

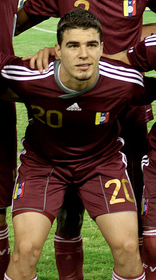
Venezuelan football player, Alexander Gonzalez.

=== History ===
Venezuela football has had a rough history throughout the years, especially with its national team, and have been looked at as pushovers. The team is known as "La Vinotinto" (The Red Wine) due to their dark burgundy jerseys showcasing the same dark color as red wine (shown in the adjacent picture). The Federación Venezolana de Fútbol was established in 1926 following the creation of the Liga Venezolana in 1921. The Venezuela national football team played their first game in 1938. Professionalism was not established until 1957 with the Copa de Venezuela arriving two years later. The Vinotinto have struggled ever since the beginning of the national team competing for The World Cup in England in 1966. From then to the 1994, attempting to qualify for The World Cup series in America, the team was known as the "whipping boys," for how badly they lost to other teams. Within this time span they competed in seven qualifying campaigns, playing a total of sixty five matches consisting a record of seven wins, seven draws, and fifty-one losses. Along with a poor of record, their goal difference was negative ninety-nine, meaning that they were scored on ninety-nine more times than they scored on opponents. Two years later, 1998, a new rule changed to the format of the qualifying process gave a little hope for the Venezuela team to compete for a World Cup because it was now easier for them to qualify. It was made easier for the team to qualify because of the new point system and matches against weaker teams. The expectations of Venezuela to have a chance to qualify were quickly shot down after the team actually started to play worse. The team play better in their previous campaigns with the harder qualifying rules than with the new.

The next season, a new head coach was chosen by the Venezuelan Football Federation (FVF). The new coach was Richard Páez, he was a former Venezuelan football player. He coached the Vinotinto until the beginning of the 2010 World Cup qualifiers where he unexpectedly resigned. In his time as head coach he revolutionized the team with the help of a younger and newer players, helping them become a winning team instead of being known as the "whipping boys." He led the team to its first ever victory over Uruguay, who then fired their head coach for the loss. After the famous 3–0 win, Páez said that "as a country, we have earned the right to savor this triumph after thirty six years of humiliation". In 2007 the Copa América tournament was held in Venezuela where the Vinotinto won its second ever match in the tournament. They went on to be undefeated, winning their bracket, until losing the quarter-finals to Uruguay 4–1. The tournament was a huge success in bringing the country closer to the National Team. It is said for, a brief moment, football the nations favorite sport. This new enthusiasm towards the team also brought higher expectations of the team as well. When coach Páez resigned, he was replaced with César Farías where he continued Páez's revolution of the National team. He currently is coaching the team and has also helped the youth of Venezuela football players increasing the intensity of play at each level which produces better players for the Vinotinto. Some experts felt that the 2014 World Cup would bring the best and closest chance for the "Vinotinto" to become prominent again at that level.

An under-20 team, an under-17 team, and a women's team also compete.

The Venezuela national under-20 football team was able to qualify for the 2009 FIFA U-20 World Cup after finishing fourth in the hexagonal final, beating teams such as Colombia and Argentina, champions of previous editions of the tournament. In 2017 the Venezuelan team became runners-up in the 2017 FIFA U-20 World Cup.

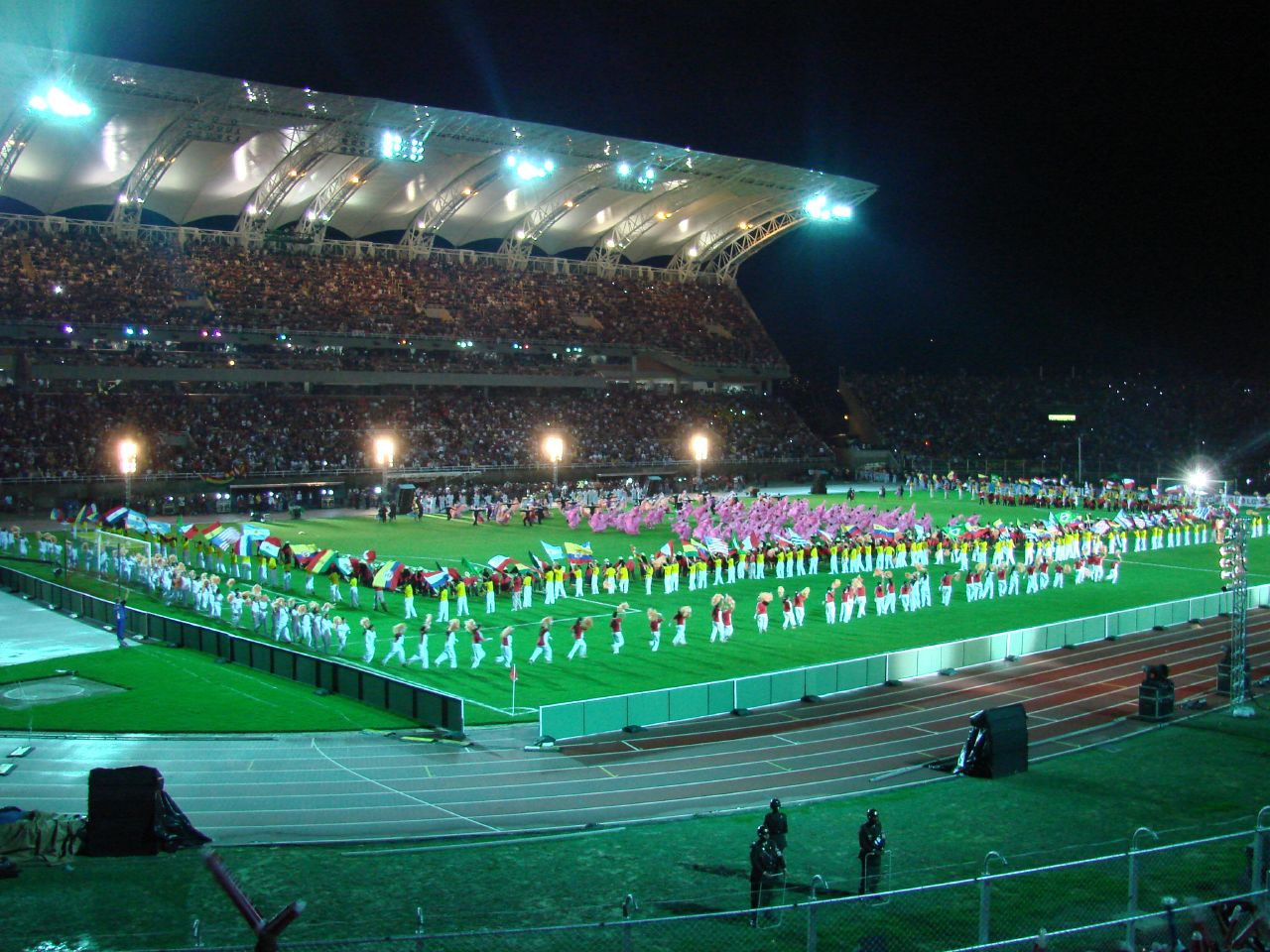
The 38,755-capacity Estadio Polideportivo de Pueblo Nuevo.

=== Football stadiums in Venezuela with a capacity of at least 30,000 ===
Stadium	Capacity	City	Home team
Estadio Monumental de Maturín	52,000	Maturín	Monagas Sport Club
Estadio Metropolitano de Fútbol de Lara	47,913	Barquisimeto	Unión Lara
Estadio Metropolitano de Mérida	42,200	Mérida	Estudiantes de Mérida FC
Polideportivo Cachamay	41,600	Ciudad Guayana	Atlético Club Mineros de Guayana
Estadio José Pachencho Romero	40,800	Maracaibo	Unión Atlético Maracaibo
Estadio Polideportivo de Pueblo Nuevo	38,755	San Cristóbal	Deportivo Táchira Fútbol Club
Estadio José Antonio Anzoátegui	37,485	Puerto la Cruz	Deportivo Anzoátegui

== Basketball ==
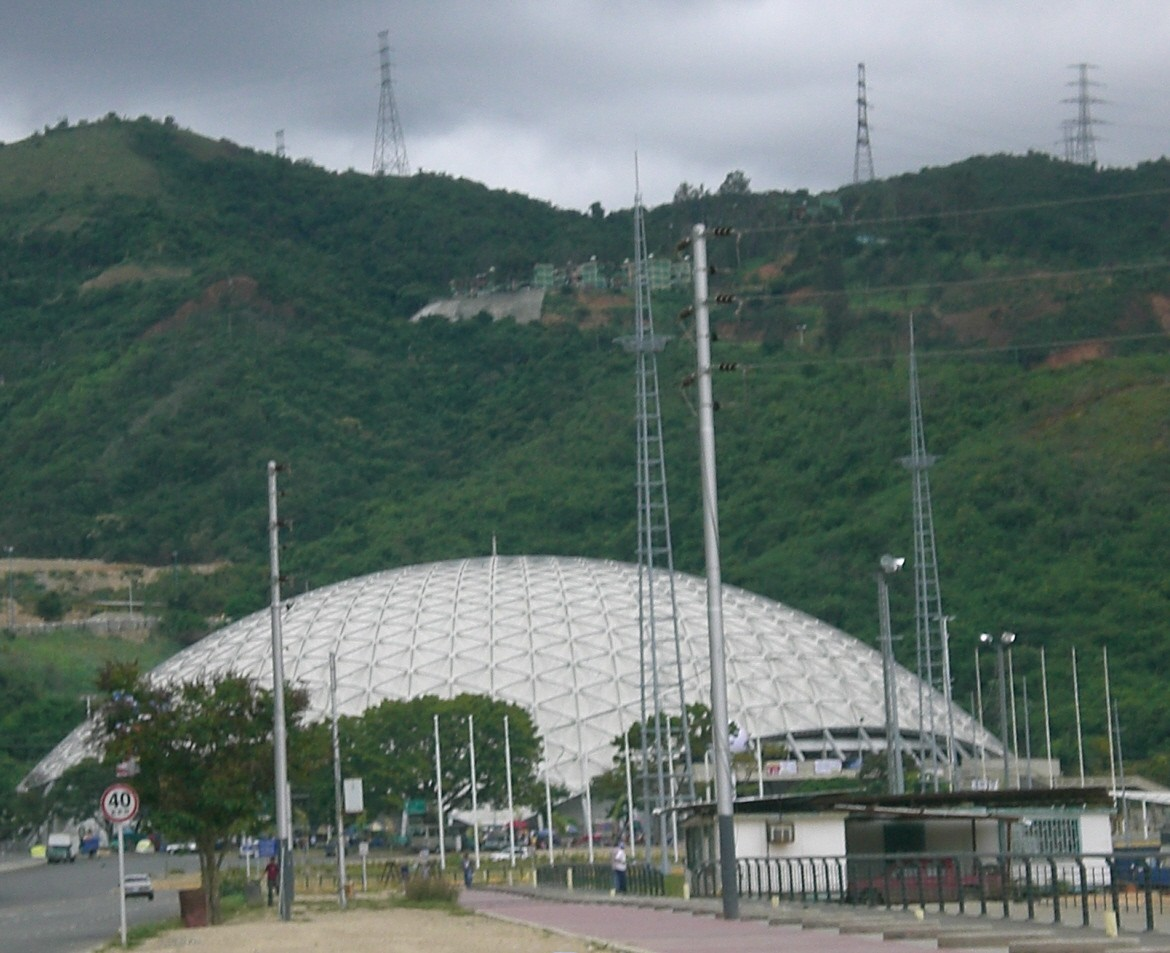
The Poliedro de Caracas serves as the arena of major basketball events in Venezuela.

Behind baseball, the most popular sport in Venezuela was basketball in 2012. Traditionally, the national team has been one of the three elite teams in South America. The country hosted the 2012 FIBA World Olympic Qualifying tournament and the 2013 FIBA Americas Championship. The (English: Venezuelan Basketball Federation) controls the men's and women's basketball teams. Venezuela has been home to several elite basketball players who have competed in the world's top basketball tournaments and leagues throughout the Americas, Europe and Asia. These players include Óscar Torres, Richard Lugo, Carl Herrera and most notably Greivis Vásquez.

The Liga Professional de Baloncesto is the main Venezuelan Basketball League, which features 14 teams.

=== Arenas ===
Venezuelan basketball venues with a capacity of at least 10,000:

City	Venue	Date built	Capacity	Tenants
Barquisimeto	Domo Bolivariano	1982	10,000	Guaros de Lara
Valencia	Forum de Valencia	1991	10,000	

=== Attendances ===
The average attendance per top-flight basketball league season and the club with the highest average attendance:

Season	League average	Best club	Best club average
2017	795	Guaros de Lara	2,285

Source: League page on Wikipedia

== Beach volleyball ==
Venezuela featured national teams in beach volleyball that competed at the 2018–2020 CSV Beach Volleyball Continental Cup in both the women's and the men's sections.

== Boxing ==
Boxing is a popular sport in Venezuela, with the country having produced several Olympic medalists and professional world champions. Well-known boxers include Betulio González, Rafael Orono, Antonio Cermeño, Antonio Esparragoza, Bernardo Piñango and Edwin Valero. In addition, although not a Venezuelan himself, Colombian Antonio "Kid Pambele" Cervantes, was popular in Venezuela and fought there many times.

== Bullfighting ==
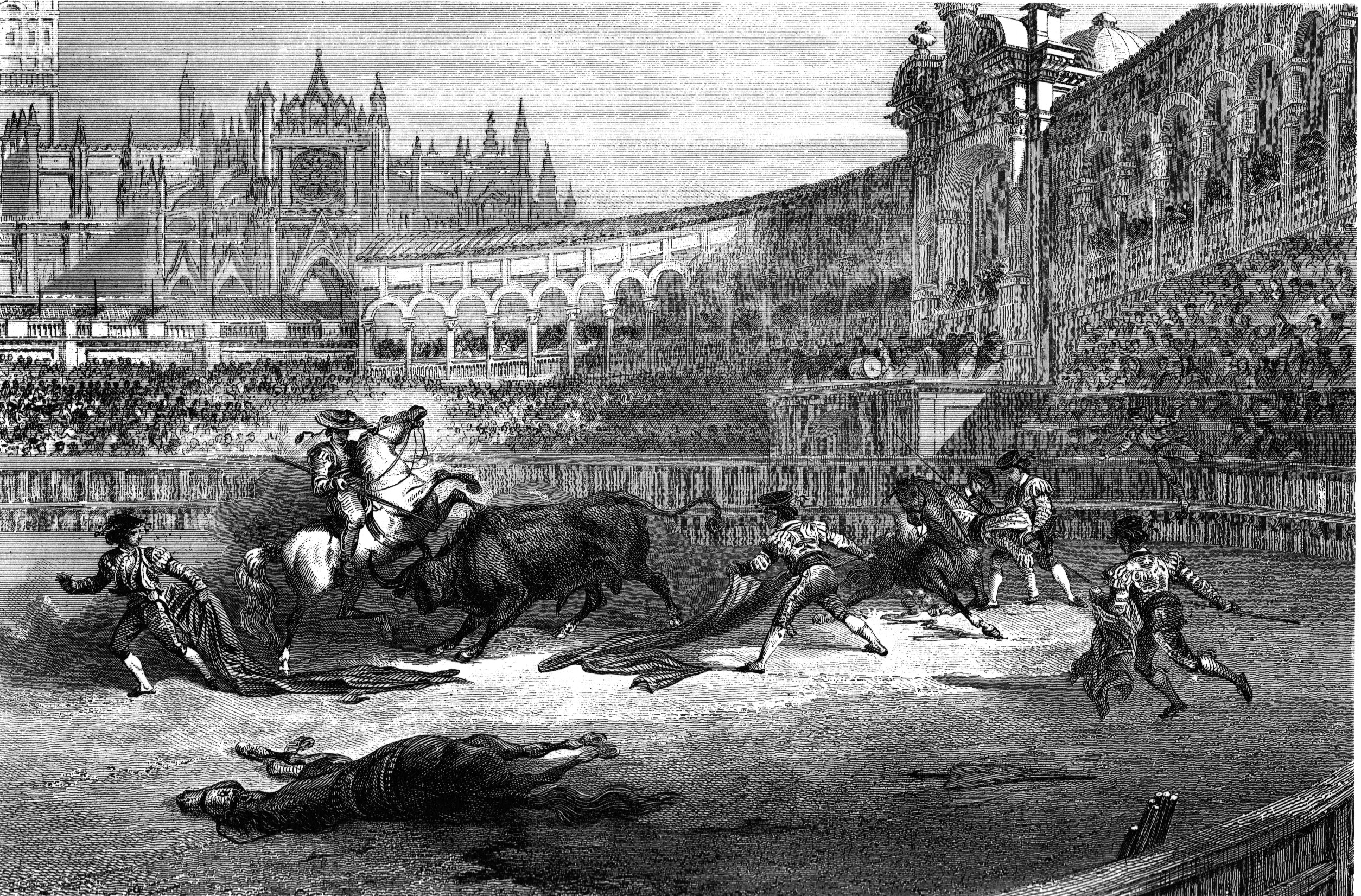
19th Century Bullfighting Festival.

Corrida de toros, or bullfighting, in Venezuela is said not to be very popular. Also, bullfighting is considered to be more of an art form that the Spanish colonists brought with them, but is still also considered a sport. The modern sport started, in Venezuela, during the 19th century, with the Spaniards' arrival. The industry started from the city of San Cristóbal. The first bullrings were built of wood and didn't have many seats, but they eventually grew to the modern "large bullring," such as the Nuevo de Caracas that was built in 1968. The industry now has 55 bullrings, more than twenty-five breeding farms for bullfighting bulls, and two schools to teach prospective future bullfighters how to fight the bulls. Festivals were normally held in honor of the patron saint or Virgin. Two of the most important festivals held are the Feria de San Cristóbal and The Feria de Sol (Festival of the Sun). These festivals have one week where each night there is an event with about four or five matadors, the "bullfighters," and an equal number of bulls. Even though these are two big events, bullfighting happens in these two places all year long. The quality of a bullfight, and how exciting the event is, is based upon the strength and power of the bull plus the skill of the matador. Bullfighting is legal in Venezuela because there is no national or state animal protection legislation that prevents animal cruelty.

=== Bullfighting stadiums in Venezuela with a capacity of at least 10,000 ===
Bullring	Location	Capacity	Image
Plaza de toros Monumental de Valencia	Valencia, Venezuela	24,708	
Plaza Monumental Román Eduardo Sandia	Mérida, Venezuela	16,000	
Plaza de toros Monumental de Maracaibo	Maracaibo, Venezuela	15,000	
Plaza Monumental de toros de Pueblo Nuevo	San Cristóbal, Venezuela	15,000	

== Coleo ==
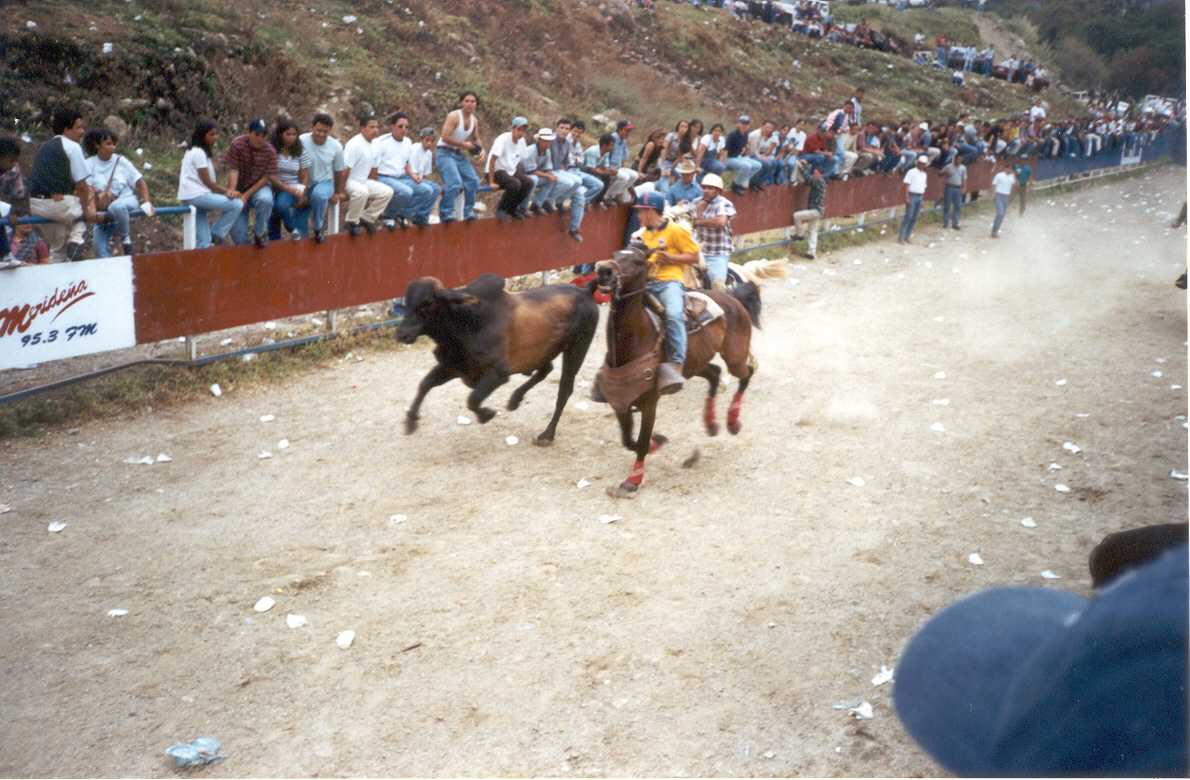
Venezuelan Coleo: Llanero on horseback chasing cattle at high speed

Although baseball, basketball, and football are the top three sports, popularity-wise, in Venezuela, the sport of Coleo has been a favorite past time for many years. The sport is most popular in the eastern and southern regions of the country. The sport is similar to that of American Rodeo, where llaneros or cowboys, will chase cattle but most commonly a bull. There are about three to five llaneros on horseback that will compete against each other and the bull. The objective of the sport is to chase a bull around an enclosed area, about the length of an American football field (100 yards), and pull the animal down to the ground by grabbing its tail. Once a llanero takes down the bull, they must let bull back up so it can continue to run around the arena. They do this by "twisting the bulls tail." Which ever llanero can get the bull down to the ground the most times out of all the riders, will win. The chase lasts about five minutes. The sport can be very dangerous, just like rodeo, because the riders can fall off their horses and be trampled by the bull. Also, sometimes the bull can break a leg or become injured, and if this happens the bull is taken immediately to the slaughterhouse, the so-called "manga".

== Cycling ==
Major events: Vuelta al Táchira, Vuelta a Venezuela, Clasico Ciclistico Banfoandes, Venezuelan National Road Race Championships, and 1977 UCI Road World Championships

== Golf ==
Major events: Copa Tres Diamantes and Venezuela Open

Jhonattan Vegas is Venezuela's most famous golfer, he was born in Maturin, Venezuela. He played college golf at the University of Texas.

Vegas turned professional in 2008 and started playing the Nationwide tour in 2009.

Vegas represented Venezuela in the 2009 Omega Mission Hills World Cup with Alfredo Adrian. They finished tied for twelfth place. Vegas won his first Nationwide Tour event in 2010 at the Preferred Health Systems Wichita Open. He finished the season seventh on the money list and earned his 2011 PGA Tour card, the first Venezuelan to do so.

In 2011, Vegas, competing as Johnny Vegas, won the Bob Hope Classic in La Quinta, California, and a week later finished tied for third in the Farmers Insurance Open at Torrey Pines Golf Course, a municipal public golf course in San Diego. He was also Venezuela's representative in golf for the 2016 Summer Olympics. On 30 July 2017 Vegas successfully defended his title at the RBC Canadian Open for his third PGA Tour win. His play earned him another place in history at the 2017 Presidents Cup as the first Venezuelan to compete in the event.

The sport has come under criticism from, and courses have been closed by, President Hugo Chávez. "Several years ago, Chávez closed three courses in the Vegas family's home state, Monagas. All were essentially clubs for workers in the nation's wealthy oil industry. Vegas's father, Carlos, who at one time worked as a caddie and later became a food concessionaire to two of the clubs, decided his son would have to leave Venezuela if he were to pursue golf seriously. ... [Chávez] has called it a 'bourgeois sport' played primarily by lazy, rich people in carts. He has closed six of the country's courses and said the government should appropriate private urban land for public housing. 'Do you mean to tell me this is a people's sport?' he said in 2009. 'It is not.' ... After Vegas won the Hope Classic, Chávez, who has not, it is believed, put buildings on any of the courses, proclaimed that he was not 'an enemy of golf, or any other sport.' He said he would call to congratulate Vegas. 'He beat all of the gringos,' he said. ... Vegas talked about having spoken with Chávez, and what he [Vegas] hopes will come about as a result of the chat: perhaps a friendlier attitude toward the sport."

The Caracas Country Club, associated with the United States and the oil industry and designed in the 1920s by the Olmsted Brothers, along with another club in the capital city, were under pressure to close in late 2010. Heavy rains had accentuated a severe housing shortage, and the president saw both political and land-use reasons for change.

== Martial arts ==
=== El Juego del Garrote ===
El Juego del Garrote (The Garrote Game) or Garrote Larense, is a Venezuelan martial art that involves machetes, garrote, and knife fencing.

== Motorsport ==
There are two important venues for motorsport activity in the country: San Carlos Circuit and Autodromo de Turagua.

Venezuela has produced some notable competitors in motorsport. Johnny Cecotto enjoyed a successful career in both motorcycle and car racing. He won the 250cc and 350cc races on his Grand Prix debut at the 1975 French Grand Prix, on the way to winning the 350cc world championship in his rookie year. He went on to win a total of 14 Grands Prix between 1975 and 1980, including three in the top 500cc class. He subsequently switched to four wheels, scoring two wins and finishing as runner up in the 1982 European Formula Two championship and racing in Formula One in 1983 and 1984. After F1 he was successful in touring car racing, winning the Macau Grand Prix Guia Race in 1986, the Italian Superturismo Championship in 1989 and the German Super Tourenwagen Cup in 1994 and 1998. He also scored 14 wins in the Deutsche Tourenwagen Meisterschaft between 1988 and 1992, and finished runner-up in the championship in 1990. His son Johnny Cecotto Jr. is also a racing driver, scoring wins in the GP2 Series.

After Cecotto's breakthrough fellow Venezuelans Carlos Lavado and Iván Palazzese also made an impact in Grand Prix motorcycling. Lavado scored 19 Grand Prix wins in the 250cc and 350cc classes and won the 250cc world championship in 1983. Palazzese scored consecutive wins in the 125cc class in the Swedish and Finnish Grands Prix in 1982 on his way to finishing third in the 125cc standings.

More recently Pastor Maldonado has emerged as Venezuela's most successful F1 racer, scoring his first and one F1 pole position and win at the 2012 Spanish Grand Prix. Previously Maldonado had been successful in GP2, scoring ten wins in the series and winning the championship in 2010.

Venezuelan racers have also competed in top-level motorsport in North America in recent years, including E. J. Viso and Milka Duno.

== Rugby union ==
Rugby union is a popular team sport in Venezuela. Rugby union is considered the fourth most popular sport in Venezuela, after baseball, football, and basketball.

== Swimming ==
Swimming is a growing sport in Venezuela. Notable Venezuelan swimmers include:

- Crox Acuna
- Patricia Maldonado
- Ricardo Monasterio
- Nelson Mora
- Andreina Pinto
- Yanel Pinto
- Oswaldo Quevedo
- Luis Rojas
- Francisco Sanchez
- Arlene Semeco
- Albert Subirats
- Rafael Vidal
- Erin Volcan

== Tennis ==
Notable Venezuelan tennis players include:

- Jorge Andrew
- Juan Carlos Bianchi
- José de Armas
- Alfonso Mora
- Gabriela Paz Franco
- Nicolás Pereira
- Maurice Ruah
- Milagros Sequera
- Jimy Szymanski
- Daniel Vallverdu
- María Vento-Kabchi

== Medals by games ==
- As of the 2019 Parapan American Games

=== Global medals ===
Games	Gold	Silver	Bronze	Total
Venezuela at the Deaflympics	12	10	15	37
Venezuela at the INAS Global Games	4	6	6	16
Venezuela at the Military World Games	1	4	10	15
Venezuela at the Olympics	2	4	9	15
Venezuela at the Paralympics	1	5	11	17
Venezuela at the Universiade	0	0	0	0
Venezuela at the World Games	5	7	11	23
Venezuela at the Youth Olympic Games	2	8	5	15
Totals (8 entries)	27	44	67	138

=== Regional medals ===
Games	Gold	Silver	Bronze	Total
Venezuela at the Pan American Games	102	220	296	618
Venezuela at the Parapan American Games	70	78	112	260
Totals (2 entries)	172	298	408	878

=== Sub regional medals ===
Games	Gold	Silver	Bronze	Total
Venezuela at the South American Beach Games	15	31	22	68
Venezuela at the South American Games	535	469	500	1,504
Venezuela at the South American Para Games	34	24	21	79
Venezuela at the South American Youth Games	33	53	52	138
Totals (4 entries)	617	577	595	1,789

=== Inter regional medals ===
Games	Gold	Silver	Bronze	Total
Venezuela at the ALBA Games	435	476	472	1,383
Venezuela at the Bolivarian Games	1,856	1,487	1,145	4,488
Venezuela at the Central American and Caribbean Games	564	782	918	2,264
Venezuela at the Ibero American Games	8	4	6	18
Totals (4 entries)	2,863	2,749	2,541	8,153

== See also ==
- Venezuela national baseball team
- Venezuela national football team
- Venezuela national basketball team
- Venezuela national rugby union team
- Lists of stadiums

== Sources ==
- Gibson, Karen Bush (2006). Venezuela: A Question and Answer Book. Capstone. ISBN 978-0-7368-6413-8.
- Nichols, Elizabeth Gackstetter; Morse, Kimberley J. (2010). Venezuela. ABC-CLIO. ISBN 978-1-59884-569-3.
- Wardrope, William (2003). Venezuela. Gareth Stevens Publishing. ISBN 978-0-8368-2369-1.
