= 2012–13 Venezuelan Professional Baseball League season =

The 2012–13 Venezuelan Professional Baseball League season (LVBP by its initialism in Spanish) was the 65th edition of this tournament. It started on October 11, 2012. A total of eight teams participated in the competition, as in the previous season. The tournament was played in honor of Luis Aparicio Ortega, who played in Venezuelan professional baseball between 1931 and 1954 with teams including Magellan, Elders of Vargas, and Gavilanes, in addition to being manager of the Aguilas del Zulia and father of infielder Luis Aparicio.

== Teams participating ==
Teams
Team	Foundation	City / State	Ballpark	Inauguration	Capacity
Águilas del Zulia	1968	Maracaibo, Zulia	Estadio Luis Aparicio El Grande	1955	23,000
Bravos de Margarita	2007	Porlamar, Nueva Esparta	Estadio Nueva Esparta	1990	13,030
Cardenales de Lara	1942	Barquisimeto, Lara	Estadio Antonio Herrera Gutiérrez	1969	20,784
Caribes de Anzoátegui	1987	Puerto La Cruz, Anzoátegui	Estadio Alfonso Chico Carrasquel	1991	17,088
Leones del Caracas	1952	Caracas, Capital District	Estadio Universitario	1951	25,000
Navegantes del Magallanes	1917	Valencia, Carabobo	Estadio José Bernardo Pérez	1955	14,638
Tiburones de La Guaira	1962	La Guaira, Vargas	Estadio Universitario	1951	25,000
Tigres de Aragua	1965	Maracay, Aragua	Estadio José Pérez Colmenares	1965	15,328

== Regular season ==
Pos	Team	G	W	L	AVE.	GB
1	Bravos de Margarita	9	7	0	.777	0
2	Navegantes del Magallanes	9	6	3	.666	1
3	Águilas del Zulia	10	6	4	.600	1.5
4	Leones del Caracas	9	5	4	.555	2
5	Cardenales de Lara	9	4	5	.444	3
5	Caribes de Anzoátegui	9	4	5	.444	3
5	Tigres de Aragua	9	4	5	.444	3
8	Tiburones de La Guaira	10	1	9	.100	6.5

Qualified for round robin

== Games ==
Week 1: October 11–21
visitor	result	local	Stadium	date	time	transmitted by
Águilas del Zulia	10 - 3	Tigres de Aragua	José Pérez Colmenares	October 11	07:30pm	Meridiano
Cardenales de Lara	4 - 6	Navegantes del Magallanes	José Bernardo Pérez	October 11	07:30pm	
Leones del Caracas	0 - 1	Caribes de Anzoátegui	Alfonso Chico Carrasquel	October 11	07:30pm	DirecTV
Bravos de Margarita	7 - 4	Tiburones de La Guaira	Universitario de Caracas	October 11	07:30pm	
Bravos de Margarita	4 - 3	Tiburones de La Guaira	Universitario de Caracas	October 12	01:00pm	Meridiano
Leones del Caracas	1 - 8	Caribes de Anzoátegui	Alfonso Chico Carrasquel	October 12	06:00pm	DirecTV
Navegantes del Magallanes	2 - 3	Cardenales de Lara	Antonio Herrera Gutiérrez	October 12	04:00pm	Promar TV
Águilas del Zulia	9 - 0	Tigres de Aragua	José Pérez Colmenares	October 12	07:30pm	
Tigres de Aragua	4 - 2	Leones del Caracas	Universitario de Caracas	October 13	05:00pm	
Águilas del Zulia	9 - 1	Navegantes del Magallanes	José Bernardo Pérez	October 13	05:30pm	DirecTV
Tiburones de La Guaira	1 - 8	Cardenales de Lara	Antonio Herrera Gutiérrez	October 13	04:00pm	Meridiano
Bravos de Margarita	7 - 6	Caribes de Anzoátegui	Alfonso Chico Carrasquel	October 13	07:30pm	
Águilas del Zulia	4 - 8	Cardenales de Lara	Antonio Herrera Gutiérrez	October 14	01:00pm	Venevisión
Tigres de Aragua	4 - 7	Leones del Caracas	Universitario de Caracas	October 14	04:00pm	DirecTV
Tiburones de La Guaira	2 - 3	Navegantes del Magallanes	José Bernardo Pérez	October 14	04:30pm	Meridiano
Bravos de Margarita	9 - 4	Caribes de Anzoátegui	Alfonso Chico Carrasquel	October 14	06:00pm	
Tiburones de La Guaira	2 - 7	Bravos de Margarita	Nueva Esparta	October 16	07:30pm	
Cardenales de Lara	3 - 5	Leones del Caracas	Universitario de Caracas	October 16	07:30pm	Meridiano
Navegantes del Magallanes	9 - 4	Águilas del Zulia	Luis Aparicio "El Grande"	October 16	07:30pm	DirecTV
Tiburones de La Guaira	Suspendido	Bravos de Margarita	Nueva Esparta	October 17	07:30pm	
Cardenales de Lara	1 - 3	Leones del Caracas	Universitario de Caracas	October 17	07:30pm	ESPN2
Tigres de Aragua	1 - 3	Caribes de Anzoátegui	Alfonso Chico Carrasquel	October 17	07:30pm	
Navegantes del Magallanes	1 - 4	Águilas del Zulia	Luis Aparicio "El Grande"	October 17	07:30pm	DirecTV
Tiburones de La Guaira	5 - 7	Bravos de Margarita	Nueva Esparta	October 18	07:30pm	
Caribes de Anzoátegui	3 - 5	Leones del Caracas	Universitario de Caracas	October 18	07:30pm	Meridiano
Cardenales de Lara	3 - 4	Navegantes del Magallanes	José Bernardo Pérez	October 18	07:30pm	
Águilas del Zulia	0 - 4	Tigres de Aragua	José Pérez Colmenares	October 18	07:30pm	DirecTV
Caribes de Anzoátegui	6 - 7	Bravos de Margarita	Nueva Esparta	October 19	07:30pm	
Bravos de Margarita	4 - 11	Tiburones de La Guaira	Universitario de Caracas	October 19	07:00pm	DirecTV
Tigres de Aragua	6 - 7	Águilas del Zulia	Luis Aparicio "El Grande"	October 19	07:30pm	
Navegantes del Magallanes	Suspendido	Cardenales de Lara	Antonio Herrera Gutiérrez	October 19	07:30pm	Promar TV Diferido
Navegantes del Magallanes	11 - 5	Tiburones de La Guaira	Universitario de Caracas	October 20	05:00pm	Meridiano
Leones del Caracas	1 - 2	Tigres de Aragua	José Pérez Colmenares	October 20	06:00pm	DirecTV
Cardenales de Lara	4 - 3	Águilas del Zulia	Luis Aparicio "El Grande"	October 20	05:30pm	
Caribes de Anzoátegui	10 - 9	Bravos de Margarita	Nueva Esparta	October 20	06:00pm	
Tigres de Aragua	1 -3	Tiburones de La Guaira	Universitario de Caracas	October 21	01:00pm	Meridiano
Caribes de Anzoátegui	11 - 10	Bravos de Margarita	Nueva Esparta	October 21	04:00pm	
Cardenales de Lara	1 - 2	Águilas del Zulia	Luis Aparicio "El Grande"	October 21	04:00pm	
Leones del Caracas	Suspendido	Navegantes del Magallanes	José Bernardo Pérez	October 21	05:30pm	Venevisión; DirecTV
