= Baseball in Venezuela =

Baseball is Venezuela's leading sport, followed by association football. Millions of Venezuelans play baseball.

== History ==
=== Development ===
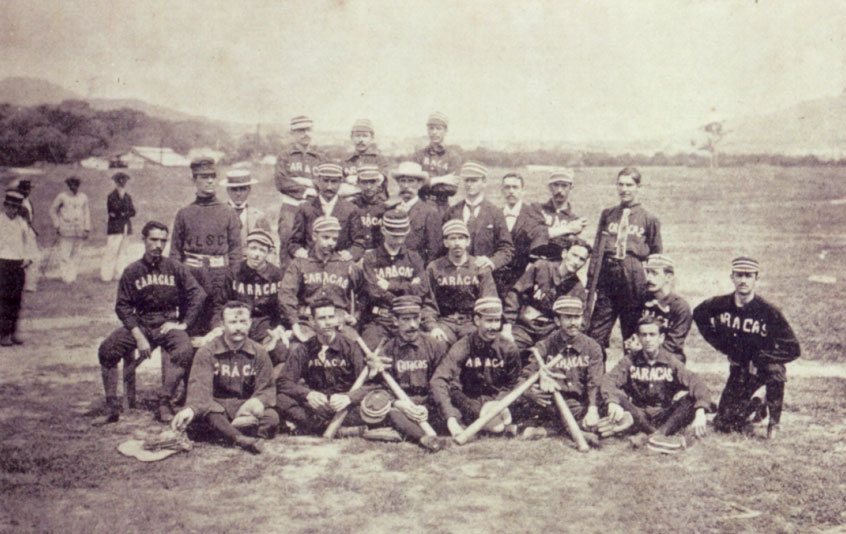
Caracas B.B.C. (1895).

Baseball originated in Venezuela in the 1880s. Its popularity rose in the 1910s and 1920s as American immigrants came to work in the exploding oil industry.

Baseball's definitive explosion in Venezuela was in 1941, the year of the Baseball World Cup in Havana when the national team beat Cuba in the finals. This team was consecrated by the press and the fans as "Los Héroes del '41" (The Heroes of '41). Since that year, baseball has transformed into the nation's most popular sport, a status it enjoys till today. Buoyed by this success, the sport took on a life on its own, and in 1945, the Venezuelan Professional Baseball League (VPBL) was established as the country's primary baseball league.

The VPBL is a winter league that was established in 1945, with Leones del Caracas the leading team; another leading club is Valencia's Navegantes del Magallanes, established in 1917. There are currently 8 teams in the league. There is a Venezuelan Summer League established in 1997 and composed of teams affiliated with Major League Baseball (MLB) clubs. The Liga paralela is a secondary Venezuelan winter league, with the teams acting as farm teams for VPBL clubs. In 2021, the Venezuelan Major League, a summer league circuit, was launched.

The popularity of baseball in the country makes Venezuela a rarity among its South American neighbors—association football is the dominant sport in the continent. Being one of the Latin American baseball powerhouses, Venezuela will compete in the Olympics tournament for the first time in 2028. For Venezuela, the Dominican Republic, and other teams from the Americas, the World Baseball Classic was their only shot at Olympic qualification.

Venezuelan team competed in the 2026 World Baseball Classic for the sixth time. On 14 March 2026, after securing a vital victory against Japan in the quarterfinals, Venezuela qualified for the historically first time in the six-team baseball tournament for 2032. They then defeated the Italy to qualify for the inaugural final. Venezuela beat the United States in the championship game by a final score of 3-2.

=== World champions ===
The Venezuela national baseball team has won the Caribbean Series a number of times. They won the Baseball World Cup several times in the 1940s, and the baseball tournament at the Pan American Games in 1959. The team finished seventh in the inaugural World Baseball Classic and third in the 2009 event, but has dropped to 10th in the 2013 event. Venezuela competed in the 2026 event and advanced to the championship game by beating defending champions Japan. They then defeated the United States in the championship game by a final score of 3–2 to win their first WBC championship.

=== MLB players ===
More than 400 Venezuelans have played in MLB since 1939, with 60 Venezuelans playing in MLB as of Opening Day in 2026, the third-most from any country, after the U.S. and the Dominican Republic.

Six MLB teams maintain training academies in Venezuela in 2010, down from 21 in 2002. Possible reasons for the decline include strained relations between the U.S. and Venezuela and the increasingly ubiquitous presence of MLB teams in the country creating more competition for talent there.

In November 2011, Washington Nationals catcher Wilson Ramos was kidnapped while home to play for his Venezuelan winter league team, Tigres de Aragua. Two days later he was rescued unharmed by police commandos in the mountains of Carabobo state. Eight people were arrested in connection with the kidnapping.

Out of the 50 players involved in the 2012 World Series, nine were Venezuelans.

In 2018, the World Baseball Softball Confederation introduced Baseball5, a game with similarities to the Venezuelan street game pelotica de goma, to the country.

== Notable players ==
The Luis Aparicio Award was established in 2004, in honor of Luis Aparicio, the only Venezuelan ballplayer inducted into the National Baseball Hall of Fame. The award is given annually to honor the Venezuelan player who recorded the best individual performance in Major League Baseball, as voted on by sports journalists in Venezuela.

- Bobby Abreu
- Ronald Acuña Jr.
- Jose Altuve
- Luis Aparicio
- Miguel Cabrera
- Dave Concepción
- Andrés Galarraga
- Armando Galarraga
- Félix Hernández
- Magglio Ordóñez
- Salvador Perez
- Francisco Rodríguez
- Johan Santana
- Omar Vizquel

== Baseball stadiums in Venezuela ==
Rank	Stadium	Capacity	City	Tenants	Image
1	Estadio Monumental de Caracas Simón Bolívar	40,000	Caracas	Leones del Caracas	
2	Estadio La Ceiba	30,000	Ciudad Guayana		
3	Estadio Luis Aparicio El Grande	23,900	Maracaibo	Águilas del Zulia	
4	Estadio Antonio Herrera Gutiérrez	22,000	Barquisimeto	Cardenales de Lara	
5	Estadio Universitario	20,723	Caracas	Tiburones de La Guaira	
6	Stadium Nueva Esparta	18,000	Porlamar	Bravos de Margarita	
7	Estadio Alfonso Chico Carrasquel	18,000	Puerto La Cruz	Caribes de Anzoátegui	
8	Estadio José Bernardo Pérez	16,000	Valencia	Navegantes del Magallanes	
9	Estadio José Pérez Colmenares	12,647	Maracay	Tigres de Aragua	

== Attendances ==
The LVBP clubs with average home attendance:

Baseball club	2011-12	2023-24
Águilas del Zulia	5,795	1,893
Bravos de Margarita	2,337	549
Cardenales de Lara	5,595	2,425
Caribes de Anzoátegui	4,926	2,732
Leones del Caracas	12,186	13,863
Navegantes del Magallanes	8,759	3,257
Tiburones de La Guaira	8,324	8,364
Tigres de Aragua	8,503	1,558
League average	7,053	4,330

== International free agency in Venezuela ==
The morality of the international free agency process in nations such as Venezuela is often questioned due to various reasons. Money-hungry agents prey on naive and underprivileged Latino baseball players in attempts to pocket as much of their signing bonuses as possible. As a result of this exploitation, many opt to attend baseball academies rather than school, which leaves them without education. These academies are often very low quality, with their main purpose being to hide players that are too young to officially sign from other teams that are scouting talent in the same area.

Players are led on by these teams by being promised free visas, even though they do not have enough to fulfill all of the promises they make. Organizations and agents often crush the dreams of these baseball players through false promises and exploitation, and get away with these acts due to the lack of regulation and laws surrounding the exploitation of young athletes. Major League Baseball is aware of this issue, however due to the current system providing the league with cheaper talent, there is no urgency to resolve any existing issues.

== See also ==
- Venezuela national baseball team
- Venezuelan Professional Baseball League
- Venezuelan Major League
- Venezuelan Summer League
- Venezuela national Baseball5 team
- Venezuela women's national baseball team

== Sources ==
- Gibson, Karen Bush (2006). Venezuela: A Question and Answer Book. Capstone. ISBN 978-0-7368-6413-8.
- Nichols, Elizabeth Gackstetter; Morse, Kimberley J. (2010). Venezuela. ABC-CLIO. ISBN 978-1-59884-569-3.
- Wardrope, William (2003). Venezuela. Gareth Stevens Publishing. ISBN 978-0-8368-2369-1.
