= Caroní Municipality =

Caroní Municipality Municipio Caroní
- Municipality
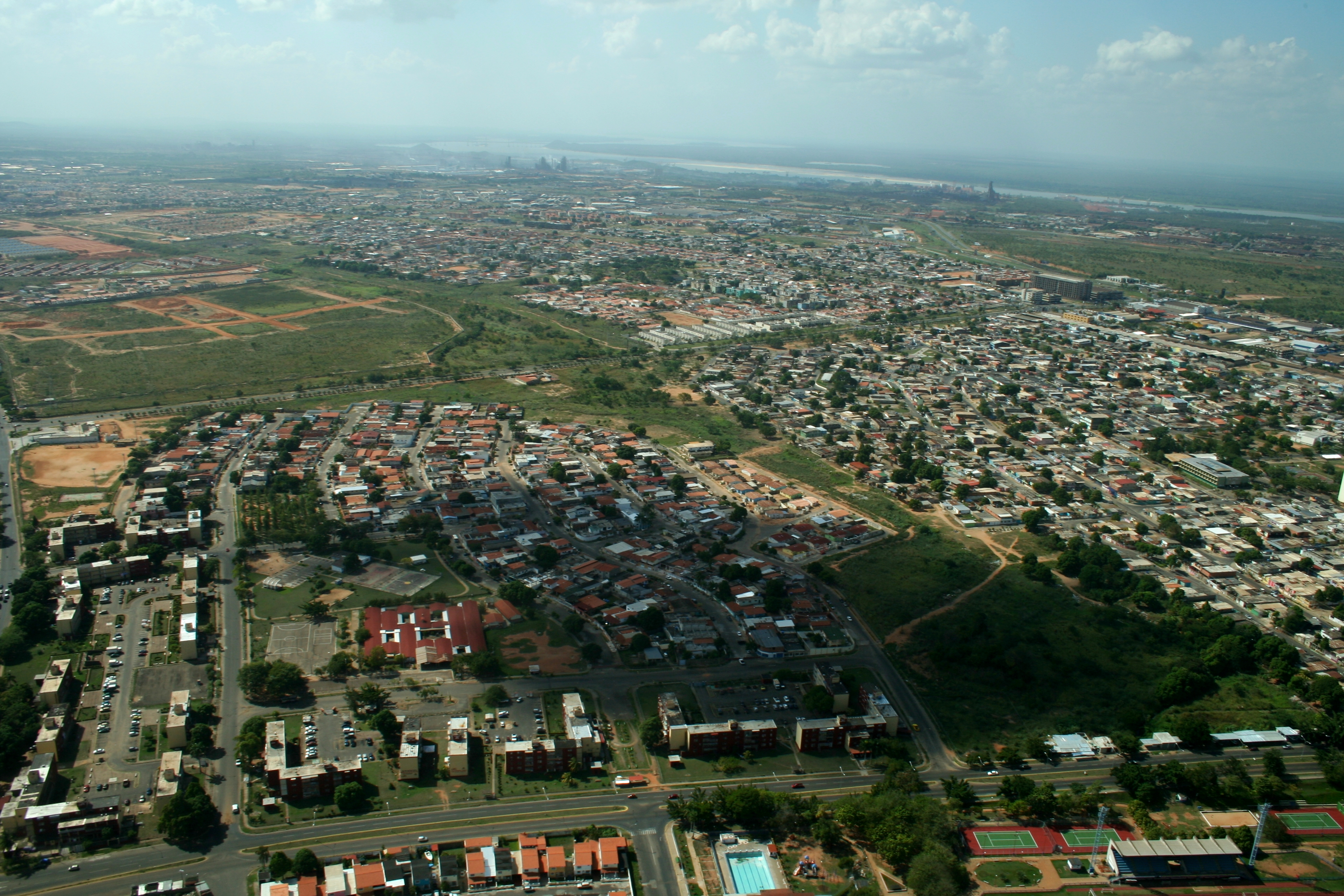
- View of Ciudad Guayana, capital of the municipality

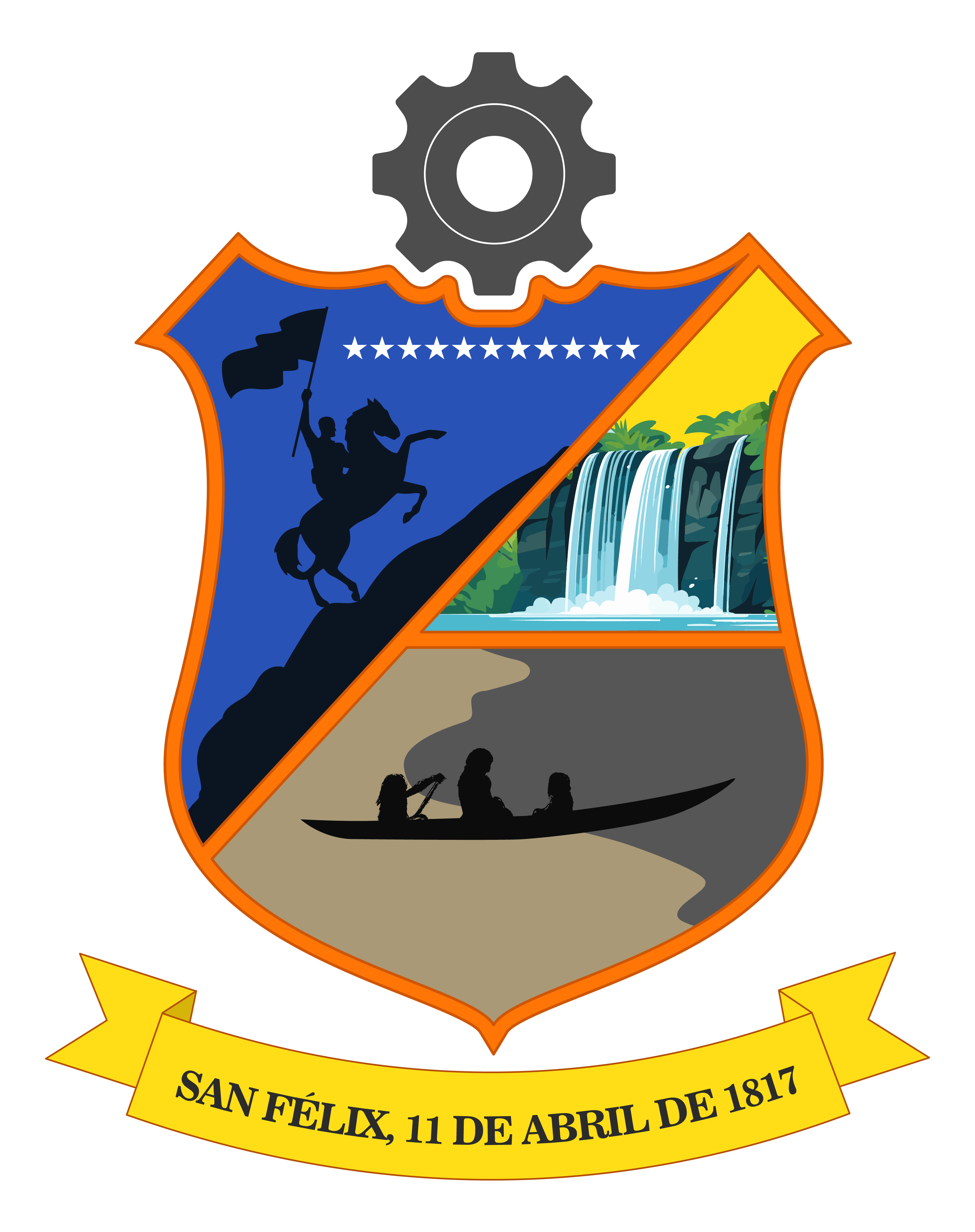
- Flag Coat of arms

- Location in Bolívar

- Location in Venezuela
- Coordinates: 8°15′00″N 62°42′52″W
- Country: Venezuela
- State: Bolívar
- Municipal seat: Ciudad Guayana

Government
  - Mayor: Yanny Alonzo Vivas (PSUV)

Area
  - Total: 1,813.9 km^{2} (700.4 sq mi)

Population (2011)
  - Total: 704,585
  - Density: 388.44/km^{2} (1,006.0/sq mi)
- Time zone: UTC−4 (VET)
- Area code(s): 0286
- Website: Official website

The Caroní Municipality is one of 11 municipalities (municipios) that make up the Venezuelan state of Bolívar. According to the 2011 census by the National Institute of Statistics of Venezuela, the municipality has a population of 704,585. The city of Guyana City is the shire town of the Caroní Municipality.

== City Hall Foundation ==
In 1819, the Congress of Angostura decreed the division of the missions' territory into four districts; in Bajo Caroní, the municipalities of San Félix, Caruachi, Murucuri, Caroní, and San Miguel were included; this, in accordance with the ordinance of 1841, was transferred to the Puerto de Tablas.

In 1864, the Sovereign State of Guayana formally divided its territory into four departments—Ciudad Bolívar, Upata, Alto Orinoco, and Bajo Orinoco—without mentioning San Félix. Toward the end of the 19th century, the name San Félix resurfaces, appearing as a foreign municipality within the District of Piar. In the 1950s, the Orinoco Mining Company (Companhia Mineira do Orinoco) constructed infrastructure at the confluence of the Orinoco and Caroní rivers to exploit the iron deposits of Cerro Bolívar.

In 1952, Puerto Ordaz is founded. In 1959, the Macagua I Dam came into operation. The CVG came into existence in 1960. In 1961 Matanzas, Puerto Ordaz, and San Félix were merged under the name Santo Tomé de Guayana (today Ciudad Guayana).

The creation of the District of Caroní took place on June 29, 1961, with the reform of the Law on Political Territorial Division of the state of Bolívar, with the capital of San Félix de Guayana and the populated centers of Puerto Ordaz, Matanzas, Castillito, Caruachi, La Ceiba, and Alta Vista.

On December 29, 1960, Rómulo Betancourt decreed the development of Guayana by Organic Statute and created the Venezuelan Corporation of Guayana as its governing body. The corporation chose July 2, 1961, to commemorate the anniversary of Ciudad Guayana, the date on which the first stone was laid.

In 1979, the district capital was changed from San Félix de Guayana to Santo Tomé de Guayana, and on June 25, 1986, the name was changed to Ciudad Guayana through a reform of the Territorial Political Division Law.

The Organic Law of the Municipal Regime, enacted on June 15, 1989, established the Municipality of Caroní, with its capital in San Félix, administered by multiple governing bodies, with the City Hall serving as the local executive authority and the City Council functioning as the local legislative body.

== Demographics ==
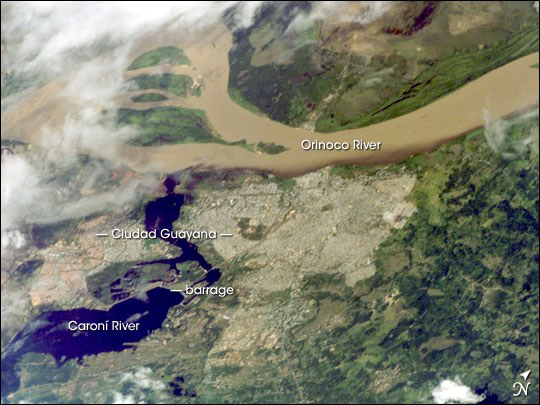
Ciudad Guayana from space, 2005

The Caroní Municipality, according to a 2007 population estimate by the National Institute of Statistics of Venezuela, has a population of 777,283 (up from 678,179 in 2000). This amounts to 50.6% of the state's population [3]. The municipality's population density is 482.19 inhabitants per square kilometre (1,248.9/sq mi).

=== Languages ===
Most of the population speaks Spanish as their mother tongue and also most of the population speaks English.

== Shield ==
The shield is surrounded by a blue border with eight stars and divided into two main districts: the one on the upper left contains a ship with unfurled sails, which represents one of those that traded with the Indies in the 18th century; the lower part has three pineapples from our continent that represent fruits discovered and converted into a symbol of tropical America, the image of Europeans.

In the second quarter, the red teardrop-shaped triangle symbolizes both the present and the future, representing the struggle and human effort to convert mining wealth into productive energy for the country. The shield crowned in the wavy lines represents two rivers, the Orinoco and the Caroní; the round millstone symbolizes the name of the Father of the Nation, the state, and the first widely productive human machine. At the bottom is a yellow ribbon that identifies the most important dates in the life of Santo Tomé de Guayana.

== Geology and geomorphology ==
In Ciudad Guayana there are three types of landscapes: plain, peniplanicie, and lomerío. The topography of flat landscapes is flat with slopes between 0-4%. The flat landscapes have a severely undulating topography with slopes of 4-16%, and the lomerío landscapes have undulating to heavily undulating terrain and are made up of hills whose slopes are greater than 8%.

The Imataca geological projection is surrounded by recent sedimentary deposits. It has alluvial deposits of gravel and sand, clayey deposits, and loams of feldspathic and granitic gneisses.

== Flora and fauna ==
Caroní Municipality supports a diverse range of plant life. This diversity is linked to the long-term geological stability of the Guiana Shield, a landmass that has remained largely unchanged over geological time. Rather than being shaped by major tectonic activity, the area has been influenced mainly by climatic variation, including periods of prolonged drought.

A variety of animal species have been recorded in the municipality, including capybara, deer, tapirs, porcupines, rattlesnakes, terecay turtles, macaws, hummingbirds, and herons, along with other mammals, birds, and reptiles. These species form part of the region’s local ecosystems and food chains.

== Hydrography ==
Most of the municipality lies within the Calinoso Massif of Ciudad Guayana, an area of low mountains and rolling erosion plains. Elevations range from about 40 to 350 metres above sea level (130 to 1,150 feet). The massif is bordered by the Imataca Range to the northeast and the Serra da Carambola to the south. The highest elevations in the area include Serra do Azul, at approximately 556 metres (1,824 feet), and Murciélago, at about 455 metres (1,493 feet).

The municipality is drained by two major rivers, the Orinoco River and the Caroní River. The Upata River, along with its tributaries the Yocoima and El Platanal rivers, flows into the Orinoco basin. The smaller La Ceiba River flows westward. The Ure and Retumbo rivers drain primarily into the Caroní River basin.

== Economy ==
Ciudad Guayana is the headquarters of the basic companies that form the C.V.G. (Corporación Venezolana de Guayana), such as Alcasa, VenalumBauxilum, andum, Carbonorca (primary aluminum products, alumina and carbon anodes for the aluminum industry, respectively) and Ferrominera (extraction, processing, and marketing of iron). It is also the headquarters of Alfredo Maneiro SIDOR (Siderúrgica del Orinoco) (a company nationalized by President Hugo Chávez in April 2008). Also based in this sector of the city are Venezuela's main electricity producer, Edelca, and the entity that promotes economic activity in the area, the Venezuelan Corporation of Guayana.

== Education ==
Ciudad Guayana is home to Universities such as:

- National Experimental Polytechnic University (UNEXPO)
- Andrés Bello Catholic University (UCAB)
- National Experimental University of Guayana (UNEG)
- National Experimental Polytechnic University of the Bolivarian Armed Forces (UNEFA)
- Great Mariscal University of Ayacucho (UGMA)

From University Institutes of Technology:

- La Salle Foundation for Natural Sciences (San Félix)
- I.U.T.I.R.L.A (Puerto Ordaz and San Félix)
- I.U.T. Antonio José de Sucre (Porto Ordaz)
- I.U.T. Pedro Emilio Coll (Puerto Ordaz)

From Polytechnic University Institutes:

- Santiago Mariño Polytechnic University Institute (IUPSM)

And Regional Centers of Study Houses such as:

- University of the East (UDO)
- Andrés Bello Catholic University (UCAB)
- Great Mariscal University of Ayacucho (UGMA)
- Bicentennial University of Aragua (UBA)

== Sports ==
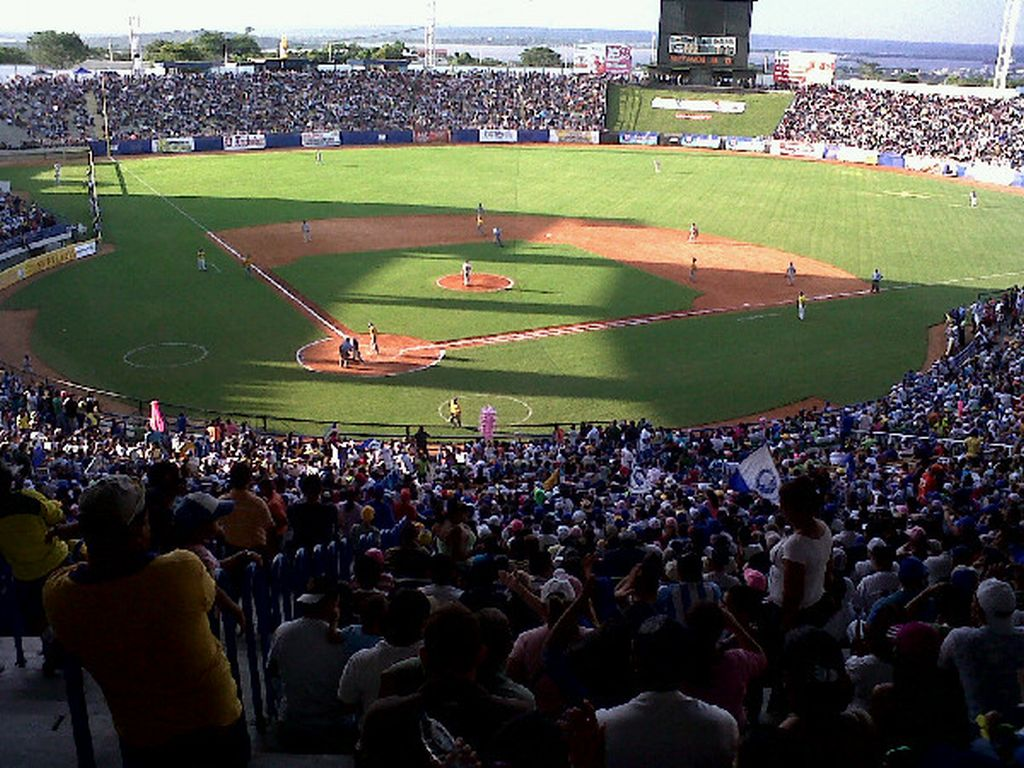
La Ceiba Stadium located in San Félix

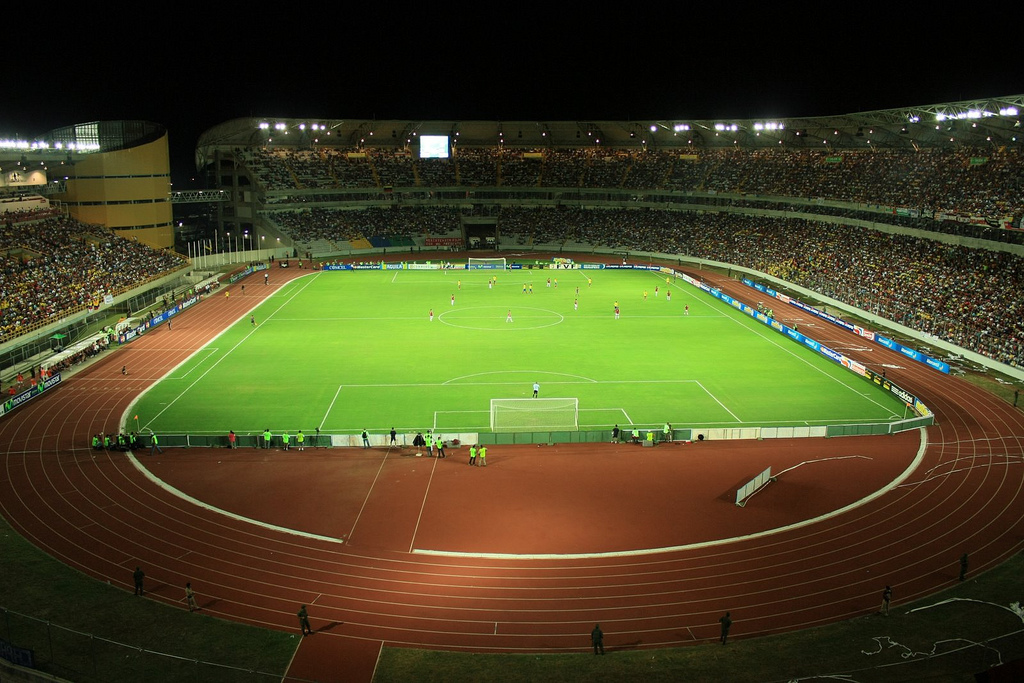
Cachamay Stadium located in Puerto Ordaz

Ciudad Guayana has a baseball stadium, Estadio La Ceiba with a capacity of 30,000 spectators, being the largest baseball stadium in Venezuela, although it does not have a professional team. It also has several professional football teams that participate in the different divisions of professional football, the most important being Mineros de Guayana, being the one with the most achievements at national and international level and one of the LALA F.C., which both teams play in the Venezuelan First Division, the Chicó de Guayana F.C. and the Fundación AIFI that both teams play in the Second Division of Venezuela all based in the majestic Cachamay Stadium in Ciudad Guayana with capacity for 41,600 spectators. In basketball playing in the LPB the team Gigantes de Guayana whose home is the Gimnasio Hermanas González with capacity for 2,000 spectators.

== Tourism ==
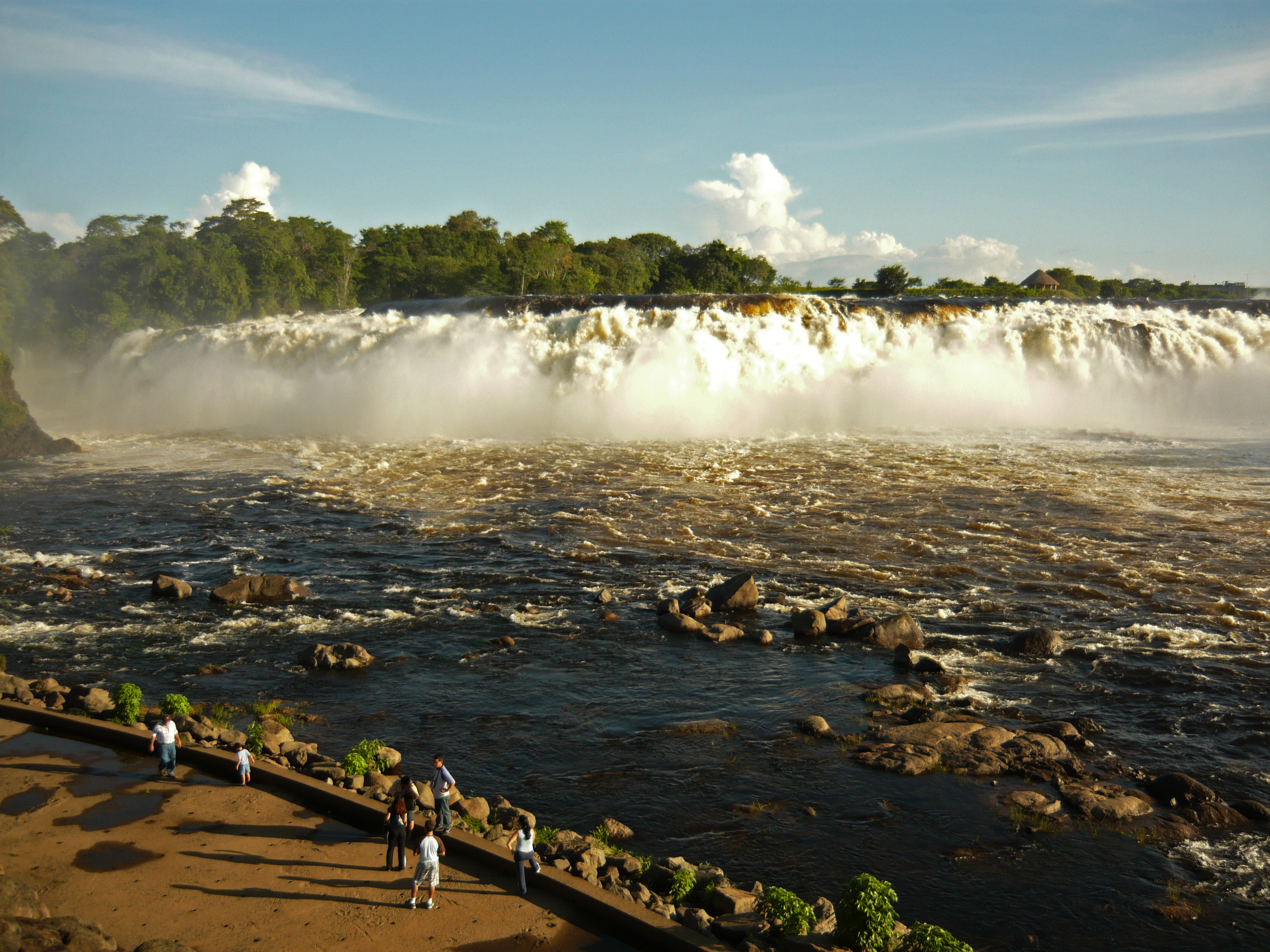
La Llovizna Jump

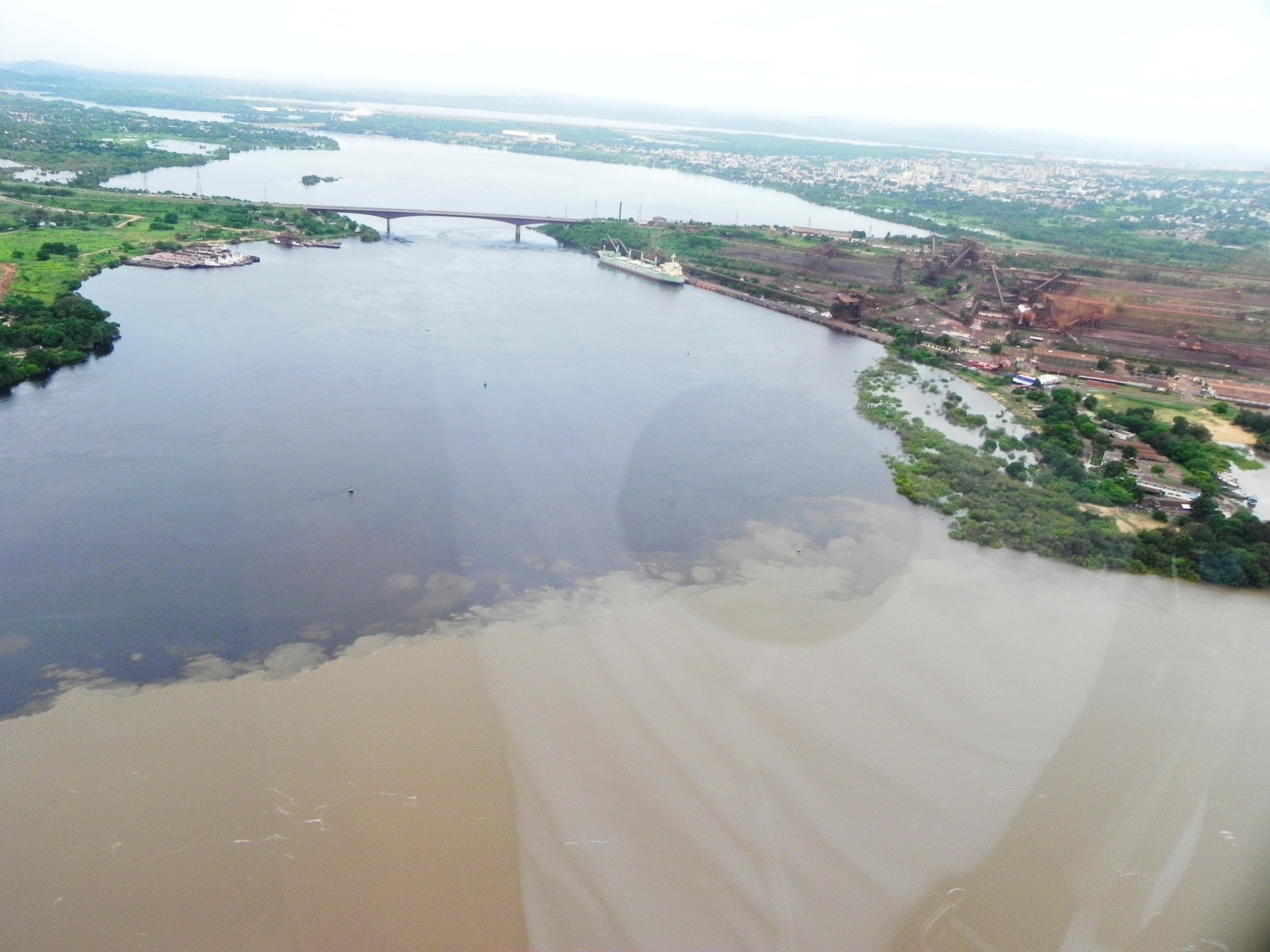
Union of the Caroní and Orinoco rivers.

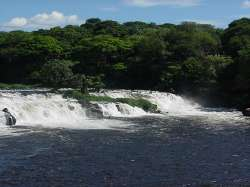
Cachamay Park waterfall

Within the city are the parks of La Llovizna and Cachamay, containing natural waterfalls. Other local attractions are the Ecomuseo del Caroní and the Macagua II Dam, probably the only case of a natural waterfall diversion dam within a city. The fracture of the relief of this natural waterfall features two natural waterfalls: the Cachamay waterfall, close to the city itself, with a width of about 800 m, although low, and the La Llovizna waterfall, with several waterfalls of greater height and great flow, although a little shorter. In this last area, located on the right bank of the Caroní (near the old Mission Caroní, founded by the Catalan Capuchins), the Macagua I hydroelectric plant was built, diverting part of the river's flow and taking advantage of the natural unevenness of the relief. This dam was considerably expanded with a larger and higher reservoir, which gave rise to a larger hydroelectric plant, close to the existing one.

On December 3, 2006, the imposing Orinoquia Bridge was inaugurated, which crosses the Orinoco River, avoiding the need to go to Ciudad Bolívar or use traditional barges.

=== Parishes ===
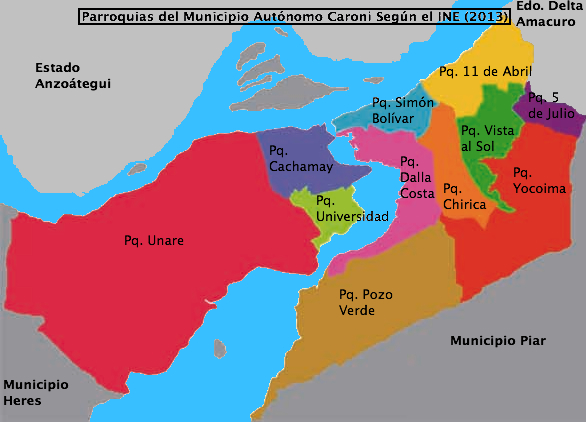
Map of the municipality of Caroní with its parishes according to the report of the National Institute of Statistics (INE) for the year 2013

The parish of 5 de Julio, which was disputed between the Municipality of Casacoima of the Delta Amacuro State and the Caroni Municipality of the Bolívar State, was finally ceded to the Caroni Municipality by decision of the Supreme Court of Justice.

== Government ==
The mayor of the Caroní Municipality is José Ramón López Rondón., elected on December 8, 2013 with 51.21% of the vote. He replaced Clemente Scotto Domínguez. The municipality is divided into 11 parishes; Cachamay, Chirica, Dalla Costa, Once de Abril, Simón Bolívar, Unare, Universidad, Vista al Sol, Pozo Verde, Yocoima and Cinco de Julio.

=== Anthem ===
Words and Music: Armando Yánez Caicedo

Chorus
Caroni! of the great deeds
real autonomous municipality,
where Tweet the strange strings
boldly shattered great,
Caroni! Great Chest of Wealth
and orchard of the national country,
we hail your rare greatness
with sacrosanct, filial love.

I
Your profile of landscapes and neighborhoods
With the river that he named you,
they present you with palm signs
as being that San Félix gestated.
Oh! Eden. your precious waterfalls
they argue the magic of the sea,
with their flirtatious fairy laughs
and unparalleled Natura nuance.

II
Caroni! Beautiful, thriving land
paradise of the right man,
sedation of the active traveler
and the world ideal solace.
Your city, the great Guiana
and your people, gentle and true,
they are the confidence of today and tomorrow
fertile life guarantee.
