= Luis Aparicio Award =

Major League Baseball award

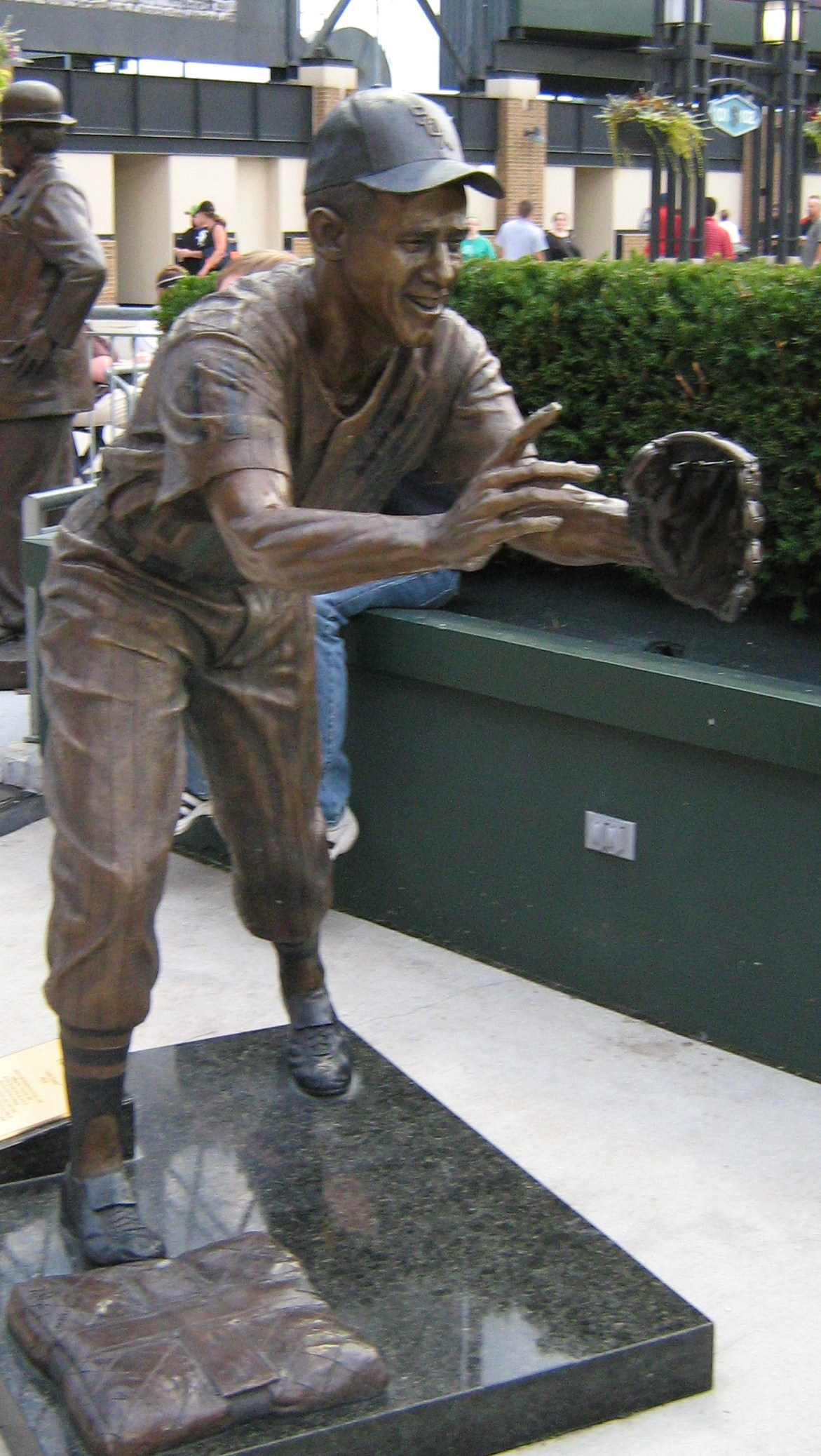
- A bronze statue of Luis Aparicio, the namesake of the award
- Location: Maracaibo, Zulia
- Country: Venezuela

History
- First award: 2004
- Most recent: Ronald Acuña Jr., Atlanta Braves

The Luis Aparicio Award is given annually to a Venezuelan player in Major League Baseball (MLB) who is judged to have recorded the best individual performance in that year. The winner of the award is determined by a vote conducted by Venezuelan sports journalists and Spanish-language media around the world. It is named after former MLB shortstop Luis Aparicio, who is the only player from Venezuela to be inducted into the National Baseball Hall of Fame. The award was first presented in 2004, and was created in order to honour Aparicio's major league career and to commemorate his father, who died thirteen years before his son was elected into the Hall of Fame.

Johan Santana, Jose Altuve, Miguel Cabrera, and Ronald Acuña Jr. are the only players to win the Luis Aparicio Award more than once, with Cabrera having won the award five times. Cabrera won the MLB Most Valuable Player (MVP) Award and Hank Aaron Award alongside the Luis Aparicio Award in 2012 and 2013, becoming the first Venezuelan to win the MLB MVP Award. Santana, the 2004 and 2006 recipient, also won the Cy Young Award in those two years, winning by a unanimous vote on each occasion. Altuve is the only player to win the Luis Aparicio Award, the MVP award, and become a World Series champion in the same season in 2017. He has also won a batting title in three of his four award seasons. Santana (2006) and Cabrera (2012) are the only award winners to also earn the pitching and batting Triple Crown respectively in the same season. In accomplishing the feat, Cabrera became the first player in 45 years to achieve a Triple Crown in batting since Carl Yastrzemski in 1967, while Santana became the first pitcher since Dwight Gooden in 1985 to secure a "Major League Triple Crown" by leading all of MLB in wins, earned run average and strikeouts. Francisco Rodríguez compiled a major league record of 62 saves in a single season in 2008 and went on to win the Rolaids Relief Man Award in the same year as the Luis Aparicio Award. Five winners, Cabrera, Altuve, Magglio Ordóñez, Carlos González, and Arráez, were batting champions in their respective leagues in the same year they won the award.

The award is presented annually before a baseball game hosted by the local team, Águilas del Zulia, on November 18 in Aparicio's hometown of Maracaibo, Zulia. The date marks both the feast of the Virgin of Chiquinquirá – the patron saint of Zulia – and the anniversary of Aparicio's professional debut. As of 2024, the most recent recipient of the award is outfielder Anthony Santander.

Prior to Game One of the 2005 World Series, White Sox manager Ozzie Guillén received an honorary Luis Aparicio Award. Days later, Guillén became the first Latino manager in major league history to win a World Series championship.

== Winners ==
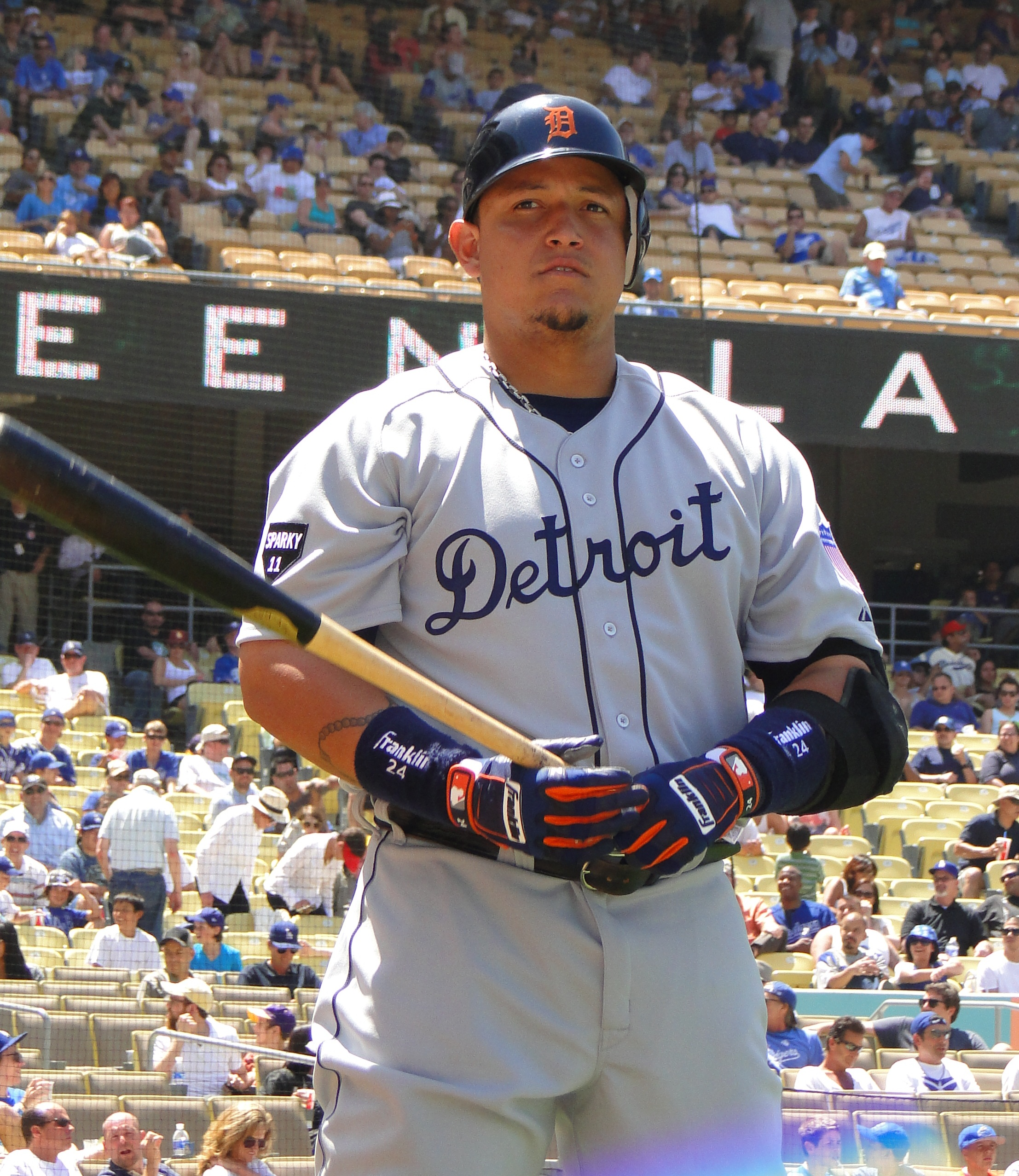
Miguel Cabrera has won the award five times.

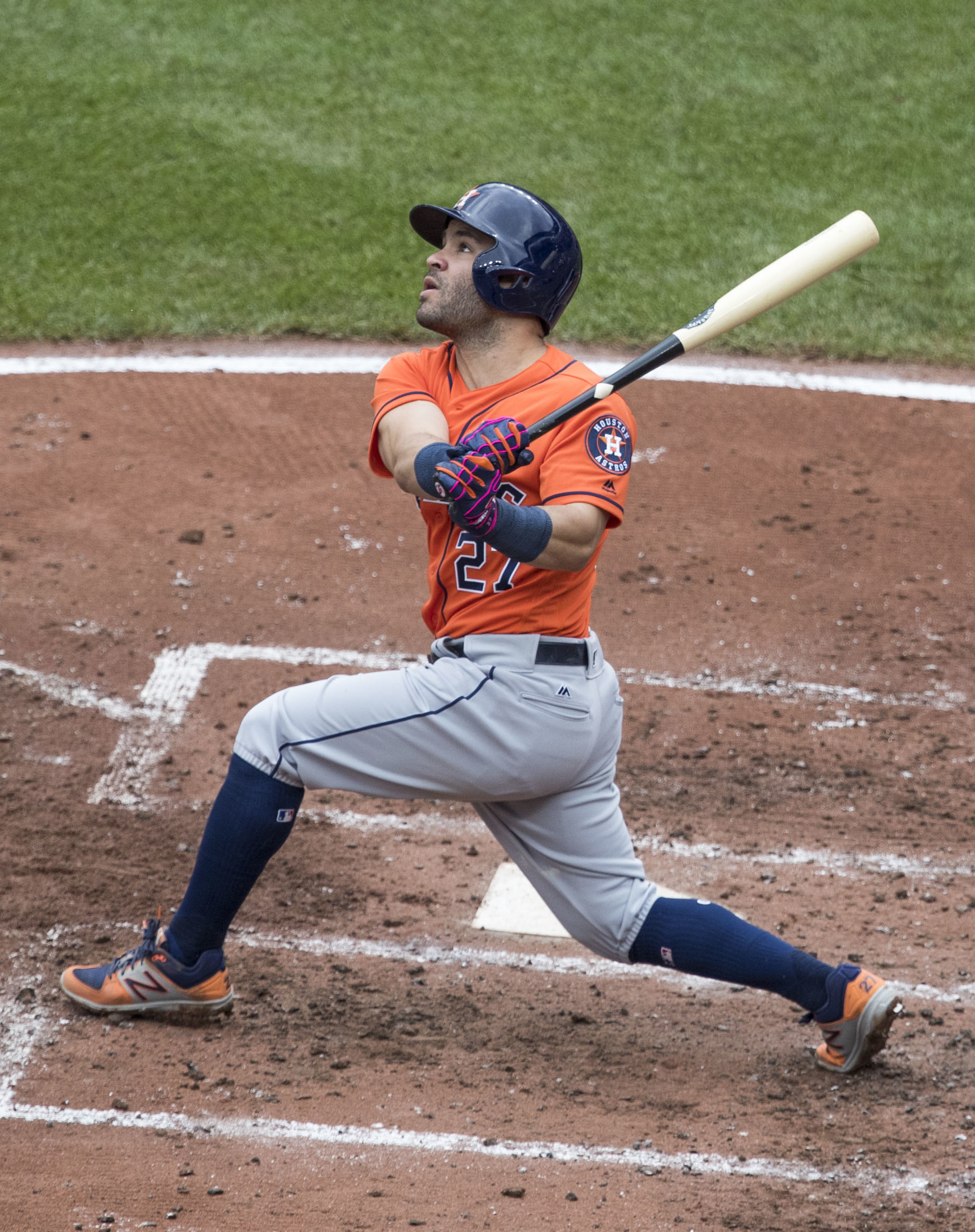
Jose Altuve is the second player with at least four awards.

Key
Year	Links to the article about the corresponding baseball year
Player (X)	Denotes winning player and number of times they had won the award at that point (if more than one)
Team	The player's team at the time he won the award
Position	The player's position at the time he won the award
^	Indicates multiple award winners in the same year
‡	Player is active

Winners
Year	Player	Position	Team	Ref(s)
2004	Johan Santana	Starting pitcher	Minnesota Twins	
2005	Miguel Cabrera	Outfielder	Florida Marlins	
2006	Johan Santana (2)	Starting pitcher	Minnesota Twins	
2007	Magglio Ordóñez	Outfielder	Detroit Tigers	
2008	Francisco Rodríguez	Relief pitcher	Los Angeles Angels of Anaheim	
2009	Félix Hernández	Starting pitcher	Seattle Mariners	
2010	Carlos González	Outfielder	Colorado Rockies	
2011	Miguel Cabrera (2)	First baseman	Detroit Tigers	
2012	Miguel Cabrera (3)	Third baseman	Detroit Tigers	
2013	Miguel Cabrera (4)	Third baseman	Detroit Tigers	
2014	Jose Altuve^{‡}	Second baseman	Houston Astros	
2015	Miguel Cabrera (5)	First baseman	Detroit Tigers	
2016	Jose Altuve^{‡} (2)	Second baseman	Houston Astros	
2017	Jose Altuve^{‡} (3)	Second baseman	Houston Astros	
2018^	Ronald Acuña Jr.^{‡}	Outfielder	Atlanta Braves	
2018^	Jesús Aguilar^{‡}	First baseman	Milwaukee Brewers	
2019	Eugenio Suárez^{‡}	Third baseman	Cincinnati Reds	
2020	Ronald Acuña Jr.^{‡} (2)	Outfielder	Atlanta Braves	
2021	Salvador Pérez^{‡}	Catcher	Kansas City Royals	
2022^	Luis Arráez^{‡}	Second baseman	Minnesota Twins	
2022^	Jose Altuve^{‡} (4)	Second baseman	Houston Astros	
2023	Ronald Acuña Jr.^{‡} (3)	Outfielder	Atlanta Braves	
2024	Anthony Santander^{‡}	Outfielder	Baltimore Orioles	

== See also ==
- Baseball awards § Venezuela
- Baseball in Venezuela
