= Estadio Nueva Esparta =

Coordinates: 10.975993°N 63.865327°W

Stadium Nueva Esparta
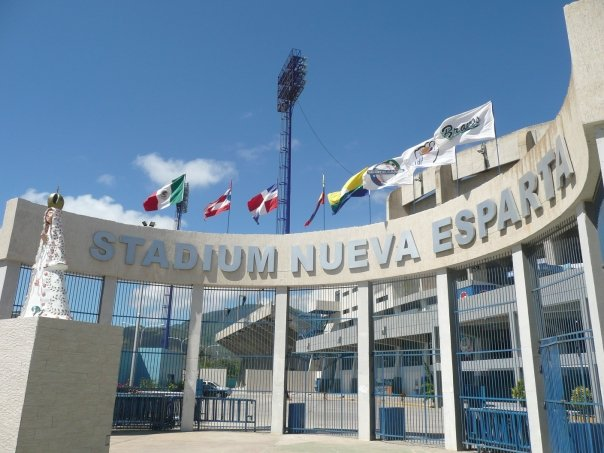
- Interactive map of Stadium Nueva Esparta
- Location: Porlamar, Venezuela
- Capacity: 18,000

Construction
- Opened: 1956

Tenant
- Bravos de Margarita (2007-present)

Stadium Nueva Esparta, also known as Estadio Guatamare, is a stadium in Porlamar, Venezuela. It is primarily used as a baseball park, and host the Bravos de Margarita's home games. It holds 18,000 people and was opened in 1956.

The ballpark hosted the Caribbean Series in 2010 and 2014.

Located in Guatamare, Porlamar, Margarita island.
