= Estadio Alfonso Chico Carrasquel =

Stadium in Puerto la Cruz, Venezuela

Estadio Alfonso "Chico" Carrasquel
- El paraíso del beisbol (The paradise of baseball)
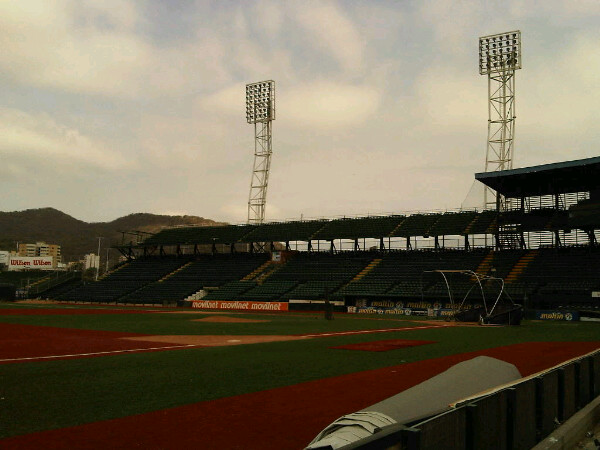
- Estadio Alfonso "Chico" Carrasquel
- Interactive map of Estadio Alfonso "Chico" Carrasquel
- Location: Puerto la Cruz, Venezuela
- Coordinates: 10.205808°N 64.630934°W
- Capacity: 18,000
- Surface: 1991-2010 Grass; 2010-present Artificial turf
- Field size: Left field - 325 ft (99 m); Center Field - 400 ft (120 m); Right field - 325 ft (99 m)

Construction
- Opened: 1991
- Renovated: 2010

Tenants
- Caribes de Anzoátegui 1991 - present; Deportivo Anzoátegui 2006 - 2007

Estadio Alfonso Chico Carrasquel is a baseball stadium based in Puerto la Cruz, Venezuela, which serves as home for the Caribes de Anzoátegui of the Venezuelan Professional Baseball League. At 28,000 square metres (300,000 ft^{2}), the plot is only just big enough to house the stadium, with room for expansion to the north and north west, and only sufficient room on the other sides to allow movement of spectators and access to the stands.

The stadium can seat 18,000 people and was originally built in 1959 under the name of Estadio Municipal de Puerto La Cruz. From 1956 through 1964, the facility served as the home for the Indios de Oriente and Estrellas Orientales clubs. Later it was rebuilt and opened in 1991, being created exclusively for professional baseball, and was renamed after former major league baseball player, Alfonso "Chico" Carrasquel.

Eventually, it was used as a multi-purpose stadium in 2006 and 2007 by hosting soccer games for the local team Deportivo Anzoátegui. During its history, the stadium has hosted two Caribbean Series editions in 1994 and 1998.

== New renovation ==
In 2010, after many talks and relocation threats, the government of Anzoátegui state started a renovation which included structural changes, a parking lot, brand new lighting kits, and artificial turf which gives realism by featuring dirt around the bases and the pitcher's mound, but dirt colored turf infield and base paths. The renovations involve creation of two-storey walkways and a pedestrian boulevard.

Since then, lounges and other amenities have also been added. In 2013, the stadium unveiled a large LED video display board and a new clubhouse.
