= Estadio Antonio Herrera Gutiérrez =

Multi-use stadium in Barquisimeto, Venezuela

Coordinates: 10.060769°N 69.357328°W

- Interactive map of Estadio Antonio Herrera Gutiérrez
- Location: Barquisimeto, Venezuela
- Capacity: 20,450

Construction
- Opened: 1969

Tenant
- Cardenales de Lara

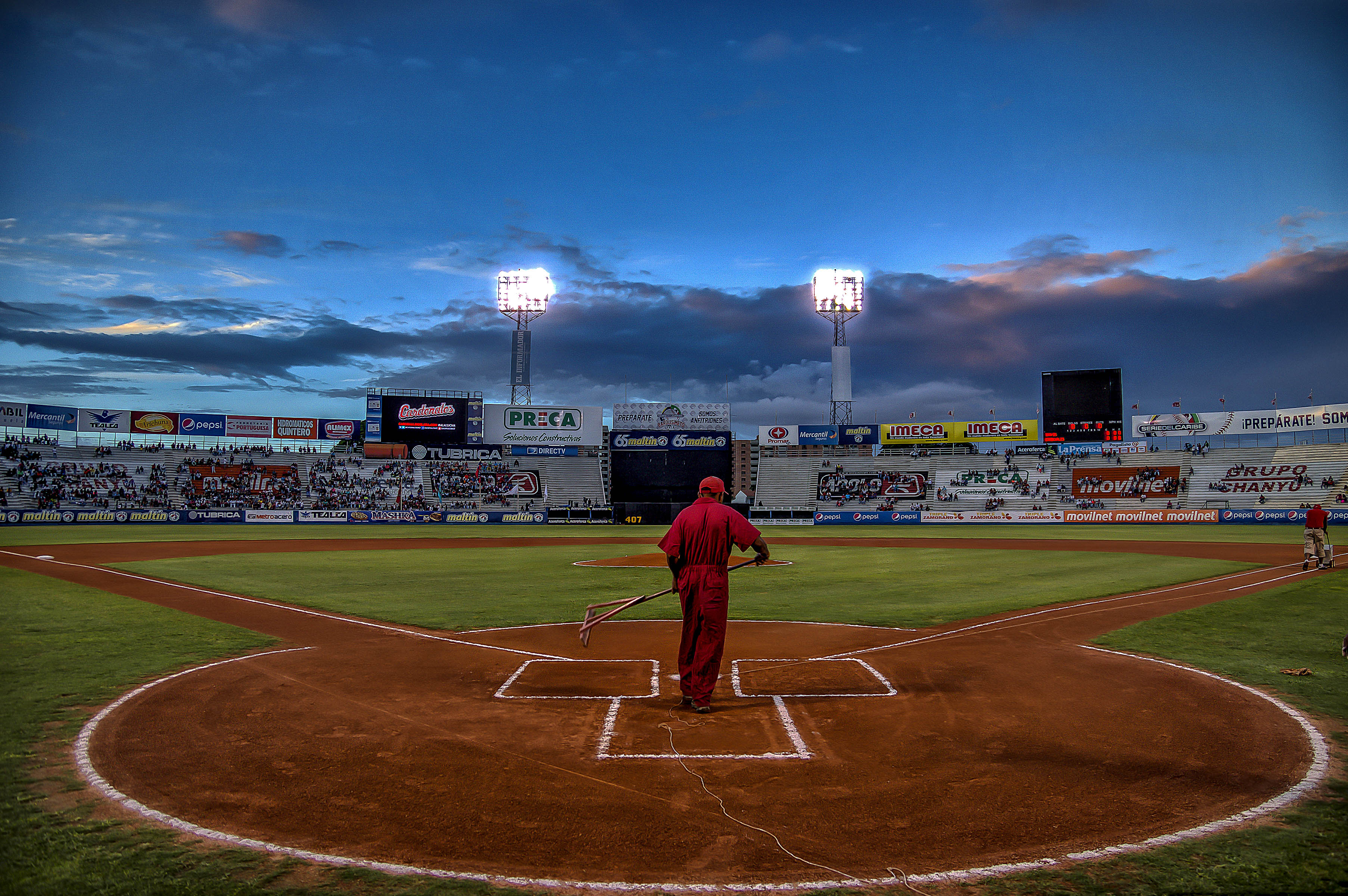
View of Estadio Antonio Herrera Gutiérrez from behind first base

Estadio Antonio Herrera Gutiérrez is a multi-use stadium in Barquisimeto, Venezuela. It is currently used mostly for baseball games and serves as the home of Cardenales de Lara. The stadium holds 20,450 people. The stadium was built between 1968 and 1969 and finally finished in 1970. It has been the home of Cardenales de Lara since. It was first called Estadio Barquisimeto and was renamed in 1991 after former owner Antonio Herrera Gutiérrez who died in Viasa Flight 742 when the plane crashed shortly after takeoff.
