= Estadio José Bernardo Pérez =

Multi-use stadium in Venezuela

Coordinates: 10.1756°N 67.9799°W

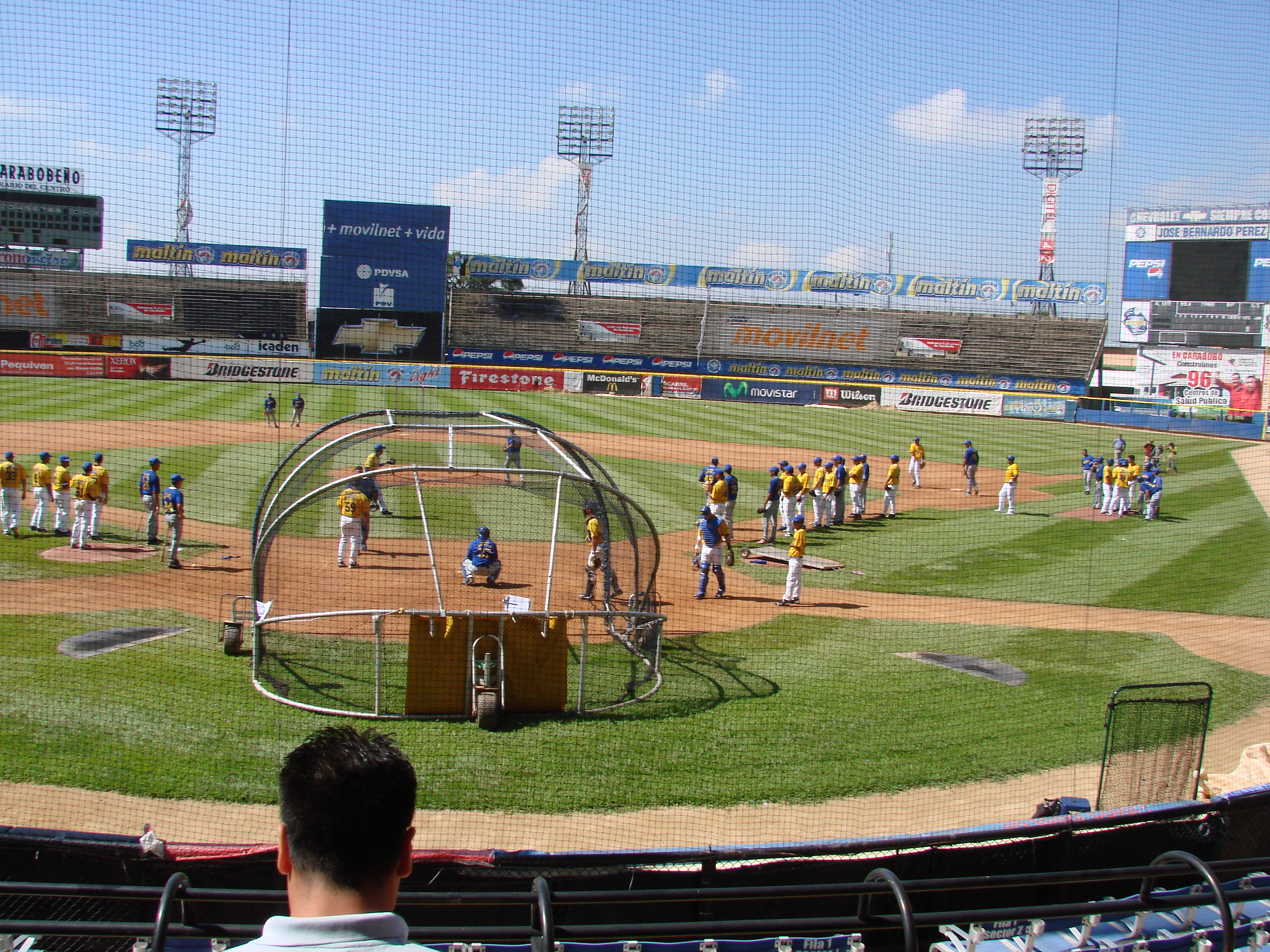
- Interactive map of Estadio José Bernardo Pérez
- Location: Valencia, Venezuela
- Capacity: 15,500

Construction
- Opened: 1955

Tenants
- Navegantes del Magallanes; Marineros de Carabobo (2021–present)

Estadio José Bernardo Pérez is a multi-use stadium in Valencia, Venezuela. It opened on October 8, 1955, and holds 15,500 people.

Originally named Estadio Cuatricentenario, it primarily served as the home stadium for the Industriales de Valencia baseball club. Prior to the 1965–1966 season, the ballpark was renamed in honour of José Bernardo Pérez, a prominent local athlete.

It is currently used mostly for baseball games and serves as the home of the Navegantes del Magallanes. The stadium co-hosted the 2006 Caribbean Series.

== Image Gallery ==
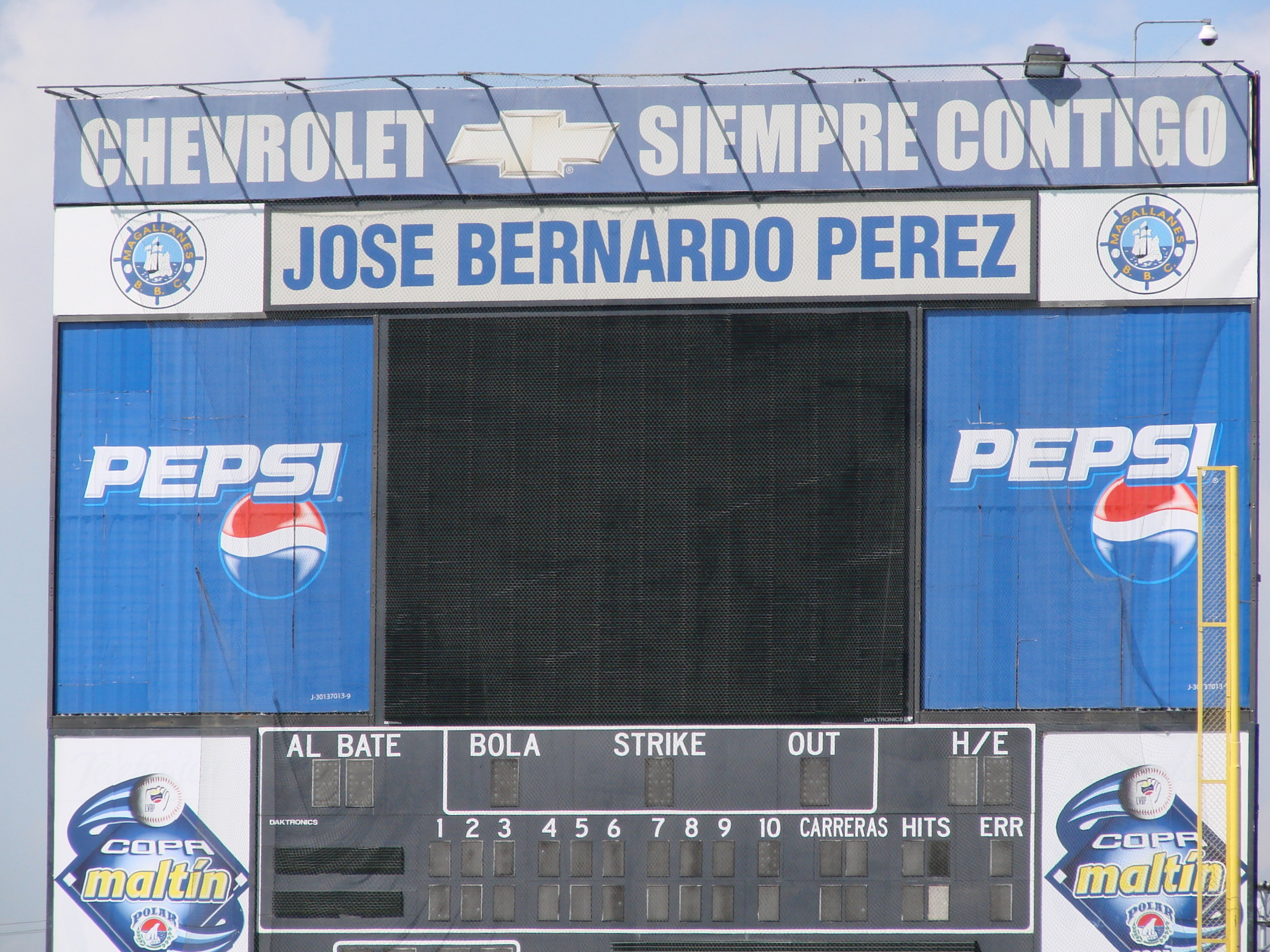
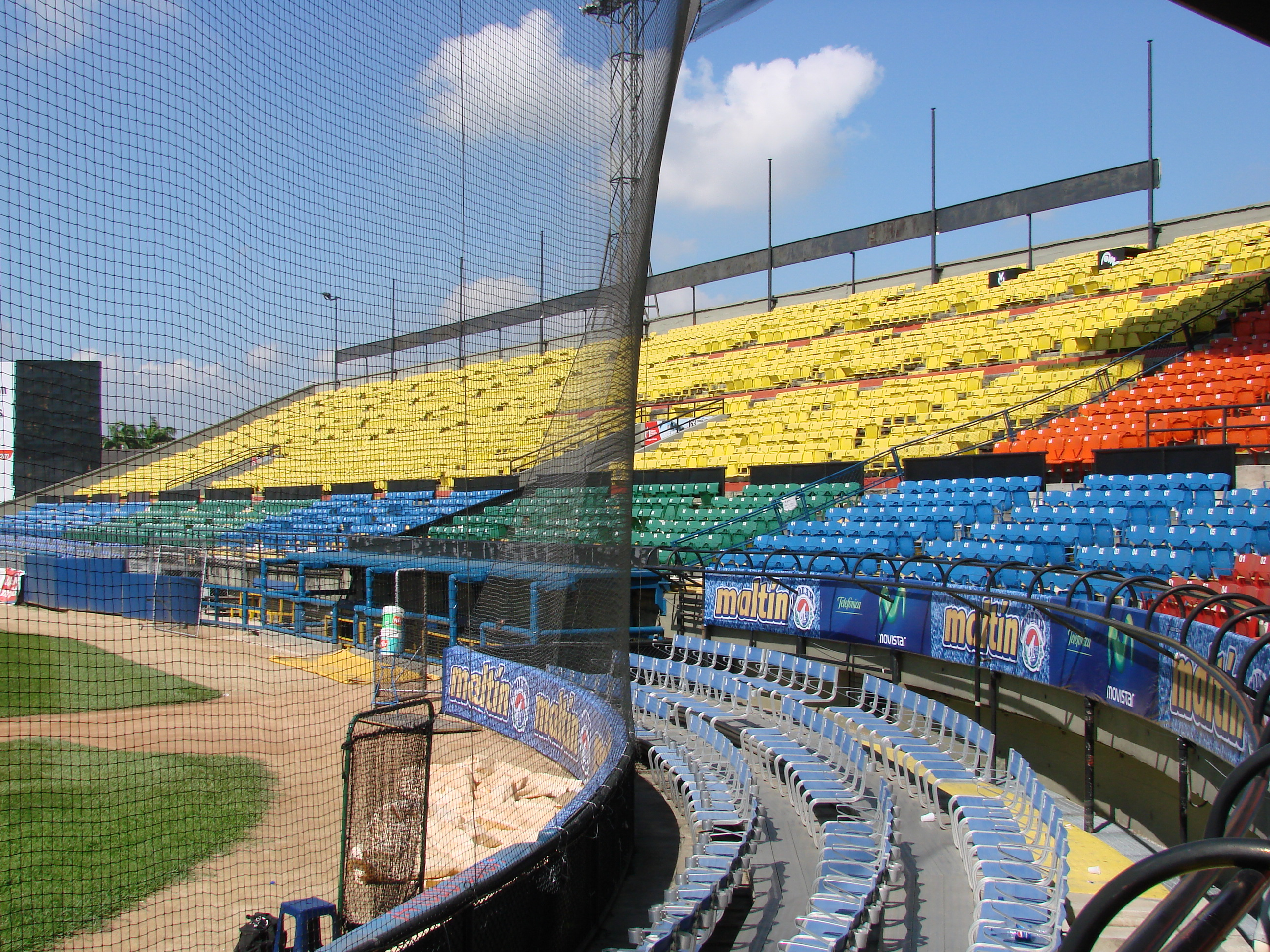
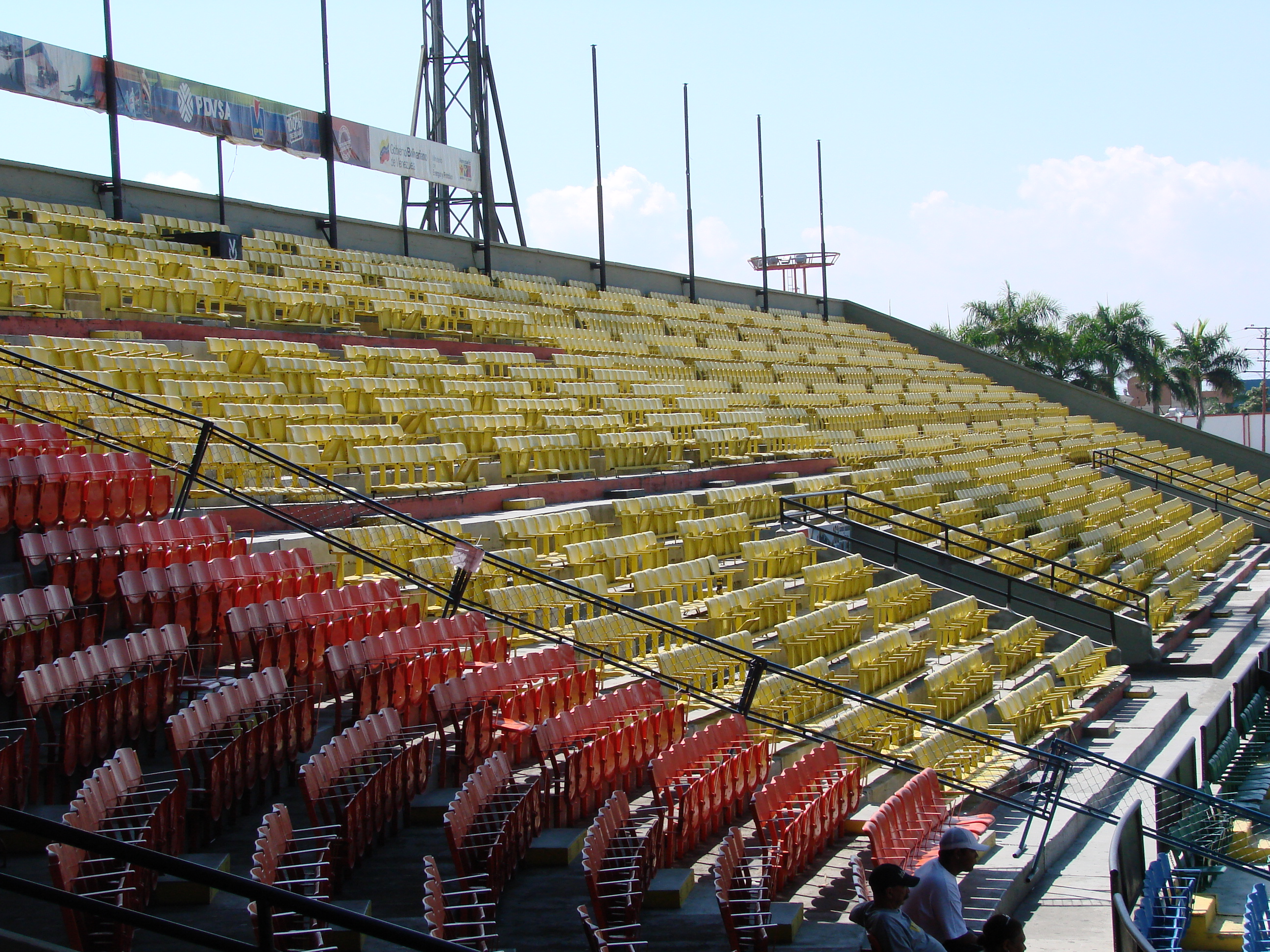
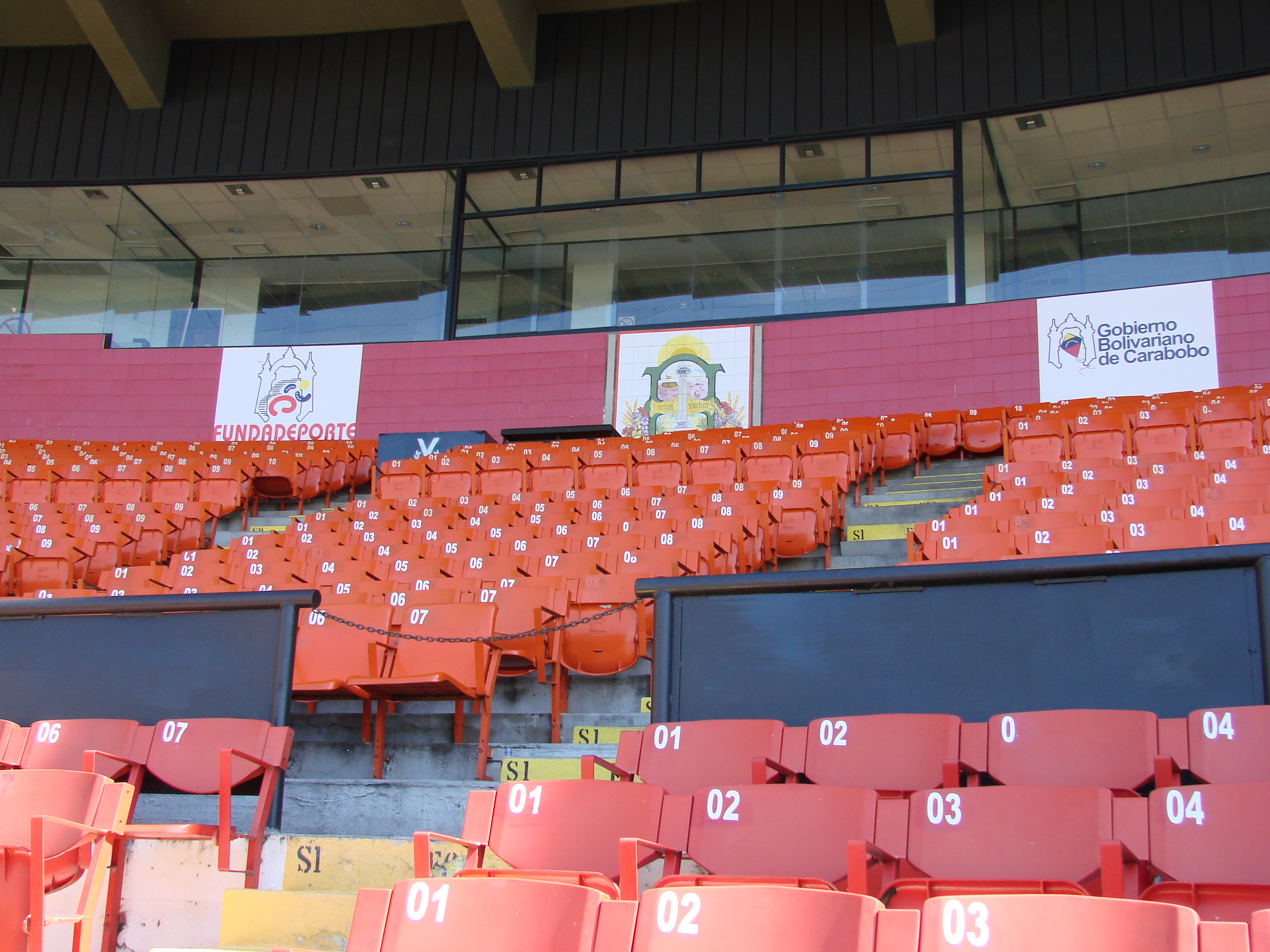
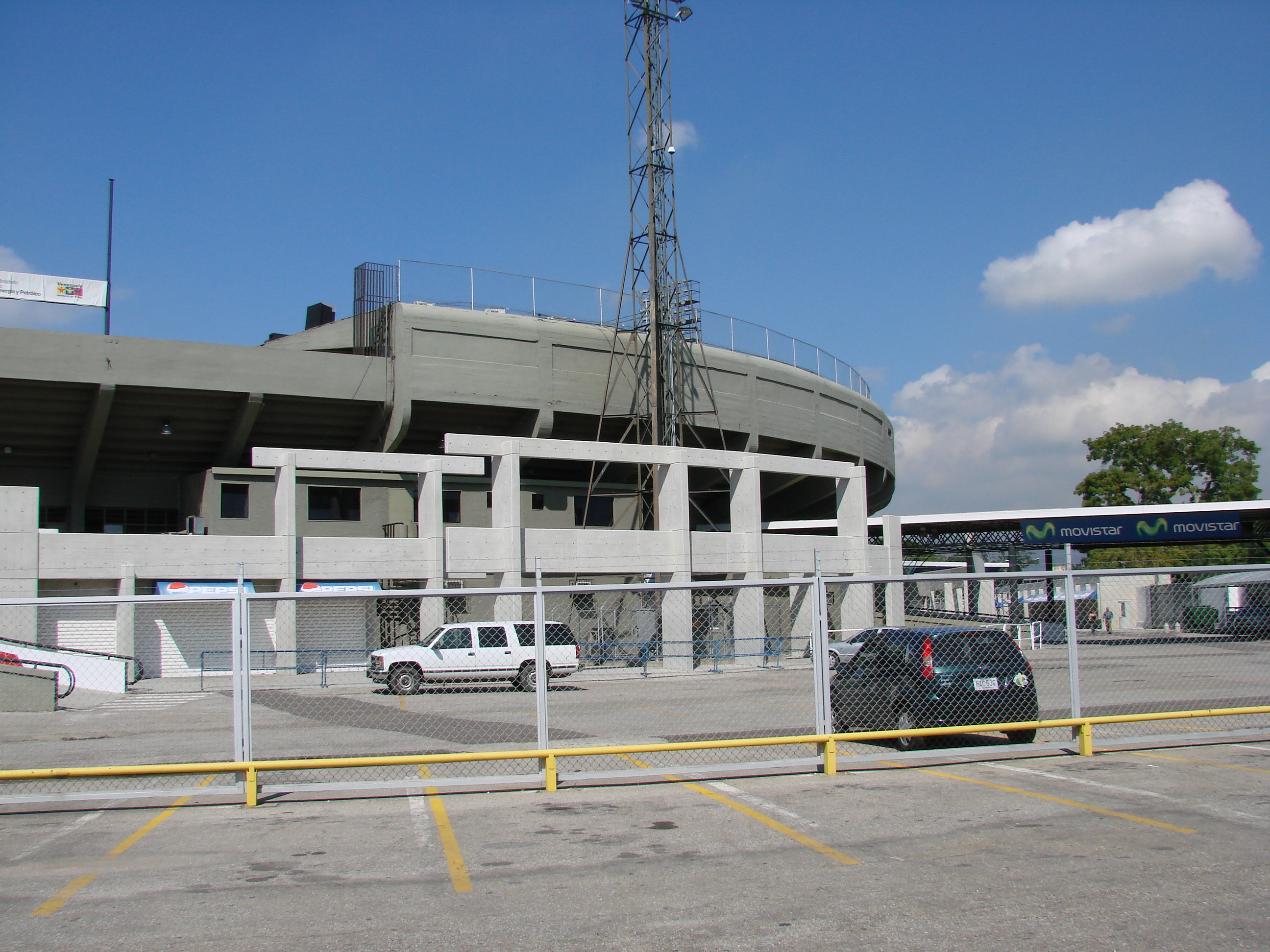
