= Estadio La Ceiba =

Coordinates: 8°20′33″N 62°40′1″W

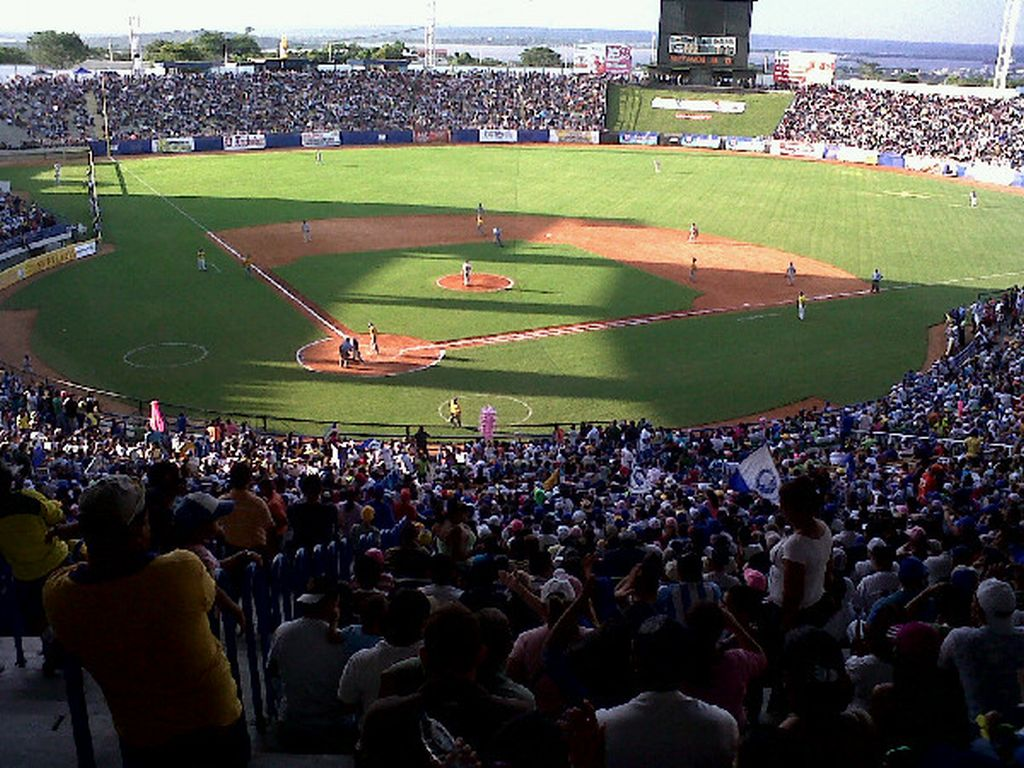

Estadio La Ceiba is a multi-use stadium in the San Felix area of Ciudad Guayana, Venezuela. It is currently used mostly for baseball games. The stadium holds 30,000 people.
