= Braudilio Vinent =

Cuban baseball player

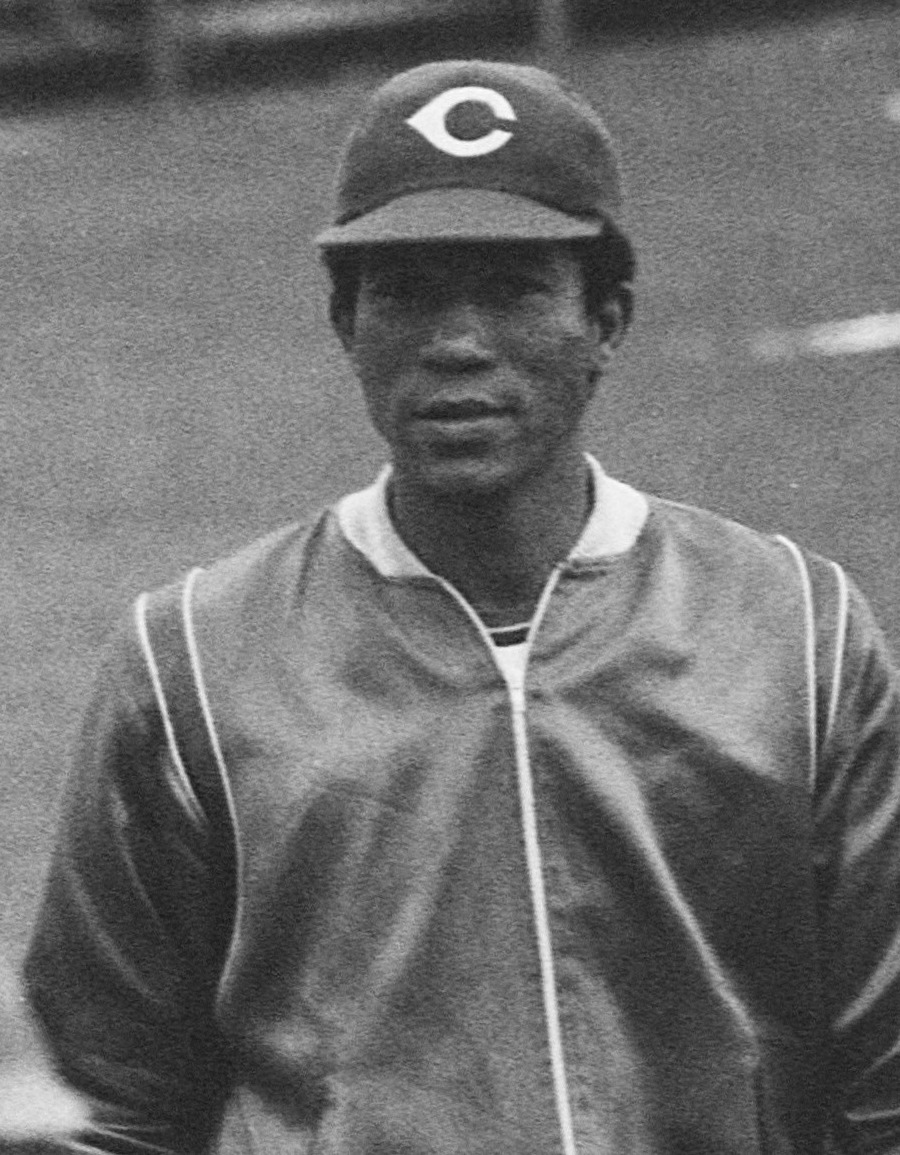
- Pitcher
- Born: July 10, 1947 (age 79); Songo – La Maya, Santiago, Cuba
- Bats: Right Throws: Right
- Stats at Baseball Reference

Member of the Cuban

Baseball Hall of Fame
- Induction: 2014
Medals
Representing Cuba
Men's baseball
Baseball World Cup
Gold medal – first place	1972 Managua	Team
Gold medal – first place	1973 Havana	Team
Gold medal – first place	1976 Cartagena	Team
Gold medal – first place	1978 Italy	Team
Gold medal – first place	1980 Tokyo	Team
Gold medal – first place	1984 Havana	Team
Pan American Games
Gold medal – first place	1971 Cali	Team
Gold medal – first place	1975 Mexico City	Team
Gold medal – first place	1979 San Juan	Team
Gold medal – first place	1983 Caracas	Team
Central American and Caribbean Games
Gold medal – first place	1970 Panama City	Team
Gold medal – first place	1974 Santo Domingo	Team
Gold medal – first place	1978 Medellín	Team
Silver medal – second place	1982 Havana	Team

Braudilio Vinent Serrano (born July 10, 1947) is a Cuban former baseball player. Nicknamed El Meteoro de La Maya (English: "The Meteor from La Maya"), he played 20 seasons in the Cuban National Series and for the Cuba national baseball team. Considered one of the best pitchers in Cuban baseball history, he was inducted into the Cuban Baseball Hall of Fame in 2014.

== Career ==
Vinent made his Cuban National Series debut with Mineros (representing Oriente Province) in 1967, posting a 1.03 earned run average and winning rookie of the year honors. He became the first pitcher in modern Cuban baseball history to reach 200 wins, in a victory over Granma on May 16, 1976. In 1986, he became the first Cuban pitcher to reach 2,000 career strikeouts. Vinent retired in 1987 with 257 wins, a league record that still stands today.He finished with a career total 3,259 innings pitched, 2,134 strikeouts, and a 2.42 earned run average.

In international play, Vinent posted a win-loss record of 56–4, appearing in 36 different tournaments for the Cuba national baseball team. With Cuba, he won four Amateur World Series championships, as well as two Intercontinental Cups and gold medals in four Pan American Games and three Central American Games.

== Post-playing career ==
After his playing career ended, Vinent served as pitching coach for the Santiago de Cuba.

Vinent defended fellow National Series player Antonio Pacheco, after Pacheco was snubbed by the Cuban Hall of Fame induction committee due to his defection from Cuba to the United States. Vinent said that Pacheco "hasn't betrayed anyone," adding that "He's over there, but he's never said anything against Cuba."

== Bibliography ==
- Peter C. Bjarkman (2007). A History of Cuban Baseball, 1864–2006. McFarland & Company. ISBN 0-7864-2829-5.
