= Heberto Portobanco =

Nicaraguan baseball manager

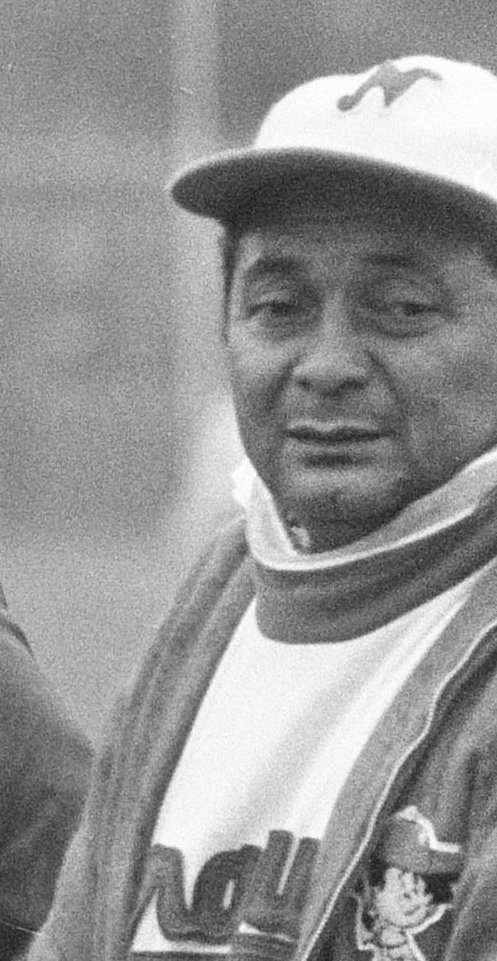
- Manager
- Born: 1925; Granada, Nicaragua
- Died: April 13, 2000 (aged 74–75)
Medals
Manager for Nicaragua
Men's baseball
Central American and Caribbean Games
Silver medal – second place	1978 Medellin	Team

Francisco Heberto Portobanco Guillén (1925 – April 13, 2000) was a Nicaraguan baseball player and manager. He managed the Nicaragua national baseball team as well as Granada in the Nicaraguan First Division (the modern Germán Pomares Championship).

Portobanco's coaching career began with Granada in the Nicaraguan Professional Baseball League. He started as a coach and later took up managerial duties after the resignation of Antonio Torres. He was responsible for the early development of a young Dennis Martínez, who played under him with Granada and with the national team. He won four championships with Granada, in 1972, 1977, 1978 and 1992–93, and was runner-up in 1971, 1973, and 1984–85.

He was named manager of the Nicaraguan national team in 1971, playing an exhibition series against a visiting team of Kansas City Royals prospects. He also managed Nicaragua at the 1971 Amateur World Series in Cuba and the 1971 Pan American Games held in Cali, Colombia, where Nicaragua narrowly lost the bronze medal game to Mexico. He was replaced by Argelio Cordoba for the 1972 Amateur World Series due to an internal dispute in FENIBA. He led the squad that won silver at the 1978 Central American and Caribbean Games in Medellín.

Prtobanco was inducted into the Nicaraguan Sports Hall of Fame in 2004. His number 18 was retired by the Tiburones de Granada of the Pomares league in 2019. A statue honoring him was erected outside the stadium in Granada in 2012.
