= Noel Areas =

Nicaraguan baseball manager (1941–2016)

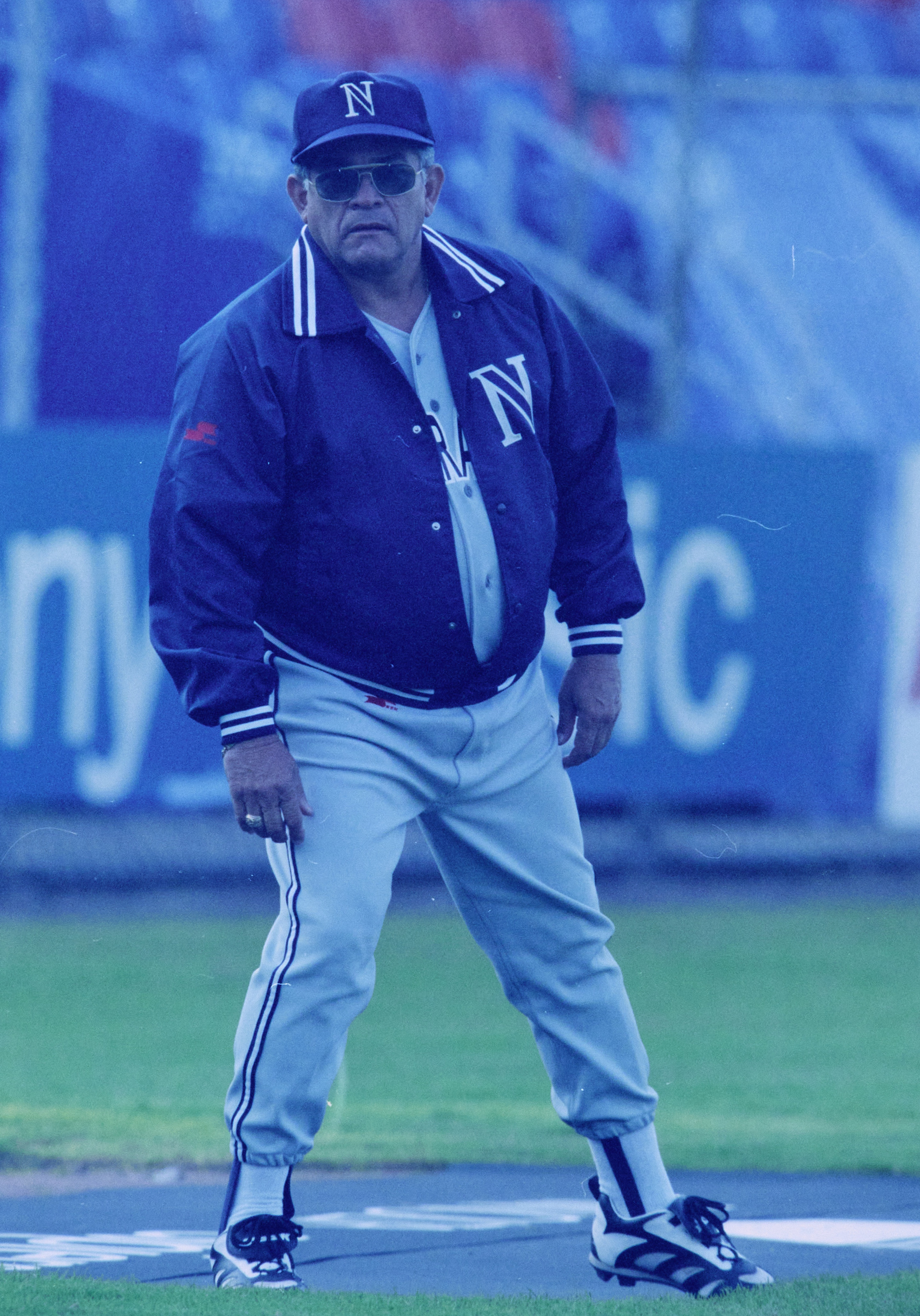
- Areas at the 1998 Baseball World Cup
- Manager
- Born: September 21, 1941; León, Nicaragua
- Died: June 5, 2016 (aged 74); Managua, Nicaragua
Medals
Men's baseball
Manager for Nicaragua
Baseball World Cup
Silver medal – second place	1974 St. Petersburg	Team
Bronze medal – third place	1998 Italy	Team
Pan American Games
Silver medal – second place	1983 Caracas	Team
Central American and Caribbean Games
Silver medal – second place	1998 Maracaibo	Team
Silver medal – second place	2014 Veracruz	Team
Central American Games
Gold medal – first place	1977 San Salvador	Team
Gold medal – first place	1986 Guatemala City	Team

Pánfilo Noel Areas Balmaceda (September 21, 1941 – June 5, 2016) was a Nicaraguan baseball player and manager. His extensive success as a manager in domestic competitions earned him the nickname "El Señor de los Anillos", or "The Lord of the Rings." Areas was also a longtime manager of the Nicaragua national baseball team.

== Career ==
Born in the Ermita neighborhood of León, Areas played baseball in his youth, but never played professionally. Heberto Portobanco dismissively described him as a "little accountant" ("contadorcito") rather than a manager. Indeed, he was working as an accountant in the office of the Metropolitanos de León when he was approached to work as a coach for the team; midway through the 1973 season, he was promoted to manager.

Areas won a championship in the Nicaraguan First Division (the modern Germán Pomares Championship) in his first season, defeating Chinandega, Carazo, and San Fernando in the finals. Areas ultimately won 11 titles managing in the First Division; eight of them with León (1973, 1980, 1981, 1983, 1984, 1986, 1990, 1997), one with Chinandega (1974), and two with Bóer (1977, 2010). His last managerial stint was with the Dantos de Managua, which he piloted in the Pomares in 2014 and 2015 (though he was replaced by Cairo Murillo in 2014 due to health reasons).

Areas became the first manager to win a professional baseball title in Nicaragua in nearly 40 years, when he led the Leones de León to a title in the inaugural season of the reformed Nicaraguan Professional Baseball League in 2005. He won a second championship in 2007, this time with Indios del Bóer, becoming the first manager to win more than one professional titles since Calvin Byron in 1966.

In international competition, Areas first managed Nicaragua at the 1974 Amateur World Series, held in St. Petersburg, Florida; he led Nicaragua to an undefeated record in group stage play, but fell to the United States in controversial fashion in the best-of-three championship series. He again led Nicaragua to a silver at the 1983 Pan American Games in Caracas. Areas twice won the gold at the Central American Games, in El Salvador in 1977 and Guatemala in 1986. He last managed the national team at the 2015 Pan American Games in Toronto.

== Death and legacy ==
Areas died of cardiac arrest on June 5, 2016. Over the course of his 42-year managerial career in the Pomares, professional league, and international competition, Areas compiled a record of 1,722 victories, according to sports researcher Martín Ruiz Borge. He was inducted into the Nicaraguan Sports Hall of Fame in 2012.
