= Julio Sánchez =

Nicaraguan baseball coach

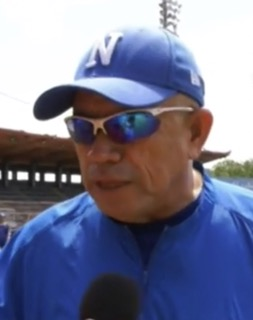
- Sánchez in 2019
- Catcher / First baseman / Manager
- Born: September 28, 1955 (age 70); Managua, Nicaragua
Medals
Men's baseball
Representing Nicaragua
Pan American Games
| Silver medal – second place | 1983 Caracas | Team |
Manager for Nicaragua
Pan American Games
| Silver medal – second place | 1995 Mar del Plata | Team |
Central American Games
| Gold medal – first place | 2001 Guatemala City | Team |
| Gold medal – first place | 2017 Managua | Team |

Julio César Sánchez Reynosa (born September 28, 1955) is a Nicaraguan professional baseball coach and police officer. One of the winningest managers in Nicaraguan baseball history, he managed the Nicaragua national baseball team at the 1996 Summer Olympics. Sánchez also holds the rank of Commissioner General in the Nicaraguan National Police.

== Baseball career ==
Sánchez played nineteen seasons in the Nicaraguan First Division, later renamed the Germán Pomares Championship, from 1974 to 1993. Over the course of his career, he played with Chinandega, Búfalos, Industriales, Bóer, Granada, and Fieras del San Fernando, batting .269 with 1,032 hits and 519 RBIs. As a member of the national team, he hit a memorable home run against the Dominican Republic at the 1983 Pan American Games in Caracas. With Nicaragua at the 1984 Summer Olympics in Los Angeles, Sánchez went 2-for-8 (.250) with a run batted in.

Sánchez first coached the Nicaraguan national team in 1995, which would be one of the most successful years in the program's history. He led the team to a silver medal finish at the Pan American Games in Argentina, qualified for the 1996 Olympics at the qualifiers in Canada, won gold at the Pacific Ocean Games in Colombia, and took home a bronze at the Intercontinental Cup in Cuba.

As a manager, he was known as a demanding leader who valued discipline from his players. During the qualifiers for the 2008 Summer Olympics, he said the current players on the national team "lack patriotism."

Sánchez has managed the Indios del Bóer of the Nicaraguan Professional Baseball League on several occasions, leading them to a title in the 2011–12 season. He also managed the Tigres de Chinandega, but resigned in November 2022 due to his commitment as a Central American scout for the Arizona Diamondbacks organization.

He was a bench coach for the Nicaraguan national team at the 2023 World Baseball Classic, as well as the 2026 World Baseball Classic qualifiers in Taiwan. In this capacity, he was also a bench coach for the FENIBA-organized Leones de León squad at the 2025 Serie de las Américas.

== Police commissioner ==
Sánchez participated in the Nicaraguan Revolution as a courier for the Sandinista National Liberation Front. After the Somoza regime was overthrown, he was a founding member of the Nicaraguan National Police.

As a police commissioner, Sánchez participated in the repression against the 2018 opposition demonstrations against the regime of Daniel Ortega in Nicaragua. When asked about the attacks on students at the Polytechnic University of Nicaragua (UPOLI), he responded: "Ask me about baseball, and I’ll tell you anything." Because of his association with Ortega, he was met with protests from Nicaraguan fans in Miami during the 2023 World Baseball Classic.
