= Baseball at the 1983 Pan American Games =

- Venues: Caracas, Venezuela
- Competitors: 11 teams

Medalists
Gold medal	Cuba
Silver medal	Nicaragua
Bronze medal	United States

Baseball at the 1983 Pan American Games was contested between teams representing Brazil, Canada, Colombia, Cuba, Dominican Republic, Netherlands Antilles, Nicaragua, Panama, Puerto Rico, United States, and Venezuela. The 1983 edition was the ninth Pan American Games, and was hosted by Caracas.

Cuba entered the competition as the three-time defending champions, having won the gold medal in 1971, 1975, and 1979. They successfully defended their title, with Nicaragua finishing second.

== Medal summary ==
=== Medal table ===
Rank	Nation	Gold	Silver	Bronze	Total
1	Cuba	1	0	0	1
2	Nicaragua	0	1	0	1
3	United States	0	0	1	1
Totals (3 entries)		1	1	1	3

=== Medalists ===
Event	Gold	Silver	Bronze
Men's	Cuba: Pedro Medina; Juan Castro; Alberto Martínez; Antonio Muñoz; Alfonso Urquiola; Antonio Pacheco; Ramón Otamendi; Leonardo Goire; Pedro Jova; Amado Zamora; Fernando Hernández; Víctor Mesa; Lourdes Gourriel; Braudilio Vinent; Rogelio García; Julio Romero; Lázaro de la Torre; Jorge Luis Valdés; Mario Véliz; Félix Núñez	Nicaragua: Cruz Ulloa; Elvin Jarquin; Tomás Guzmán; Julio Moya; Diego Raudez; César Monge; Adolfo Álvarez; Luis Cano; Roberto Espino; Ariel Delgado; Julio Medina; Julio César Sánchez; Arnoldo Munoz; Alvaro Munoz; Cayetano García; Apolinar Cruz; Pablo Juárez; Danilo Sotelo Sr.; Leo Cárdenas; Roger López	United States: Vince Barger; Bill Swift; John Hoover; Doug Henry; Tim Belcher; Jeff Ballard; Todd Burns; B. J. Surhoff; John Marzano; Jim Puzey; Tom Scaletta; John Verducci; Jeff Paul; Keith Miller; Mark McGwire; Ben Abner; Eric Fox; John Fishel; Cory Snyder; Kevin Penner

== Statistical leaders ==
=== Batting ===
Statistic	Name	Total
Batting average	Two tied with (Note: Hector Paniagua (DOM), Víctor Mesa (CUB))	.550
Hits	Two tied with	11
Runs	(Cuba) Víctor Mesa	10
Home runs	(Cuba) Víctor Mesa	3
Runs batted in	(Cuba) Víctor Mesa	10
Stolen bases	Four tied with (Note: Julio Medina (NIC), Leonardo Carde (NIC), Jesús Cartagena (VEN), Pedro Medina (CUB))	2

=== Pitching ===
Statistic	Name	Total
Earned runs allowed	(Cuba) Rogelio García	0.00
Strikeouts	(Cuba) Rogelio García	18
