= Baseball at the 1978 Central American and Caribbean Games =

- Venue: Diamante Luis Alberto Villegas, Medellín
- Dates: 8 — 21 July 1978
- Competitors: 146 from 9 nations
- Teams: 9

Medalists
gold medal	Cuba
silver medal	Nicaragua
bronze medal	Puerto Rico

Baseball was contested at the 1978 Central American and Caribbean Games in Medellín, Colombia. The games were played at the Diamante Luis Alberto Villegas, part of the Atanasio Girardot Sports Complex, between July 8 and 21. It would be the last major international baseball tournament hosted by Colombia until the 2006 Central American and Caribbean Games; additionally, it is the only major baseball tournament to be played in Medellín, a region where association football has traditionally enjoyed far more popularity than baseball.

Cuba won its fourth consecutive gold medal for baseball at the Games, bringing its total to eight. The 1978 squad, which was largely the same as the squads for the 1978 Amateur World Series and 1979 Pan American Games, has been cited as the best Cuban national team selection of all time. Two future members of the Cuban Baseball Hall of Fame participated: Antonio Muñoz and Braudilio Vinent.

== Medalists ==
Event	Gold	Silver	Bronze
Men's baseball	Cuba; Antonio Muñoz; Armando Capiró; Luis Casanova; Cheíto Rodriguez; Pedro Jova; Alfonso Urquiola; Fernando Sánchez; Agustín Marquetti; Pedro Medina; Rey Vicente Anglada; Wilfredo Sánchez; Rodolfo Puente; Alberto Martínez; Braudilio Vinent; Lázaro Santana; Juan Oliva; Félix Pino; Gaspar Legón; Santiago Mederos; Rogelio García	Nicaragua; David Green; Pablo Juárez; Vicente López; Roberto Espino; Ernesto López; Calixto Vargas; Julio Moya; Juan Espinosa; Wayne Taylor; Julio Cuaresma; César Jarquín; Víctor Filippini; Porfirio Altamirano; Sergio Lacayo; Douglas Moody; A. Espino; A. García	Puerto Rico; Milton Crespo; Rogelio Negrón; Juan Martínez; Cesaréo Márquez; Luis Mercado; David Rodriguez; Luis R. Colón; Tulio Claudio; Ramón Lara; Carlos Ponce; Henry Cirilo; Erwin Hernández; Héctor Rivera; Raúl Mulero; Obdulio Valentín; Julio A. Cruz; Carlos Crespo; Robert Rivera; Neftalí Maldonado; Jesus Feliciano Sr.

== Results ==
8 July 1978; 9:50 (UTC–5)	Puerto Rico	10 – 5	Venezuela	Diamante Luis Alberto Villegas, Medellín

8 July 1978; 14:00 (UTC–5)	Dominican Republic	11 – 7	Netherlands Antilles	Diamante Luis Alberto Villegas, Medellín

8 July 1978; 18:00 (UTC–5)	Colombia	5 – 11	Cuba	Diamante Luis Alberto Villegas, Medellín

9 July 1978; 9:10 (UTC–5)	Nicaragua	7 – 2	Netherlands Antilles	Diamante Luis Alberto Villegas, Medellín

9 July 1978; 12:30 (UTC–5)	Puerto Rico	4 – 18 (F/7)	Cuba	Diamante Luis Alberto Villegas, Medellín

9 July 1978; 14:35 (UTC–5)	Dominican Republic	14 – 7	Colombia	Diamante Luis Alberto Villegas, Medellín

10 July 1978; 9:07 (UTC–5)	Venezuela	5 – 15 (F/7)	Cuba	Diamante Luis Alberto Villegas, Medellín

10 July 1978; 12:00 (UTC–5)	Nicaragua	15 – 5	Colombia	Diamante Luis Alberto Villegas, Medellín

10 July 1978; 15:15 (UTC–5)	Puerto Rico	16 – 4 (F/8)	Cuba	Diamante Luis Alberto Villegas, Medellín

11 July 1978; 9:00 (UTC–5)	Netherlands Antilles	10 – 13	Colombia	Diamante Luis Alberto Villegas, Medellín

11 July 1978; 12:30 (UTC–5)	Venezuela	16 – 1 (F/7)	Dominican Republic	Diamante Luis Alberto Villegas, Medellín

11 July 1978; 15:30 (UTC–5)	Nicaragua	7 – 2	Puerto Rico	Diamante Luis Alberto Villegas, Medellín

12 July 1978; 9:00 (UTC–5)	Cuba	16 – 3 (F/7)	Dominican Republic	Diamante Luis Alberto Villegas, Medellín

12 July 1978; 11:43 (UTC–5)	Netherlands Antilles	6 – 17 (F/7)	Puerto Rico	Diamante Luis Alberto Villegas, Medellín

12 July 1978; 14:40 (UTC–5)	Venezuela	5 – 6	Nicaragua	Diamante Luis Alberto Villegas, Medellín

13 July 1978; 9:10 (UTC–5)	Netherlands Antilles	8 – 9	Venezuela	Diamante Luis Alberto Villegas, Medellín

13 July 1978; 12:50 (UTC–5)	Cuba	12 – 0 (F/7)	Nicaragua	Diamante Luis Alberto Villegas, Medellín

13 July 1978; 18:20 (UTC–5)	Colombia	10 – 7	Puerto Rico	Diamante Luis Alberto Villegas, Medellín

14 July 1978; 12:00 (UTC–5)	Dominican Republic	2 – 13 (F/7)	Nicaragua	Diamante Luis Alberto Villegas, Medellín

14 July 1978; 9:00 (UTC–5)	Colombia	2 – 12 (F/7)	Venezuela	Diamante Luis Alberto Villegas, Medellín

15 July 1978; 9:00 (UTC–5)	Venezuela	13 – 17	Puerto Rico	Diamante Luis Alberto Villegas, Medellín

15 July 1978; 13:50 (UTC–5)	Netherlands Antilles	5 – 10	Dominican Republic	Diamante Luis Alberto Villegas, Medellín

15 July 1978; 17:15 (UTC–5)	Cuba	11 – 2	Colombia	Diamante Luis Alberto Villegas, Medellín

16 July 1978; 9:10 (UTC–5)	Netherlands Antilles	0 – 8	Nicaragua	Diamante Luis Alberto Villegas, Medellín

16 July 1978; 11:40 (UTC–5)	Venezuela	31 – 2 (F/7)	Puerto Rico	Diamante Luis Alberto Villegas, Medellín

16 July 1978; 15:00 (UTC–5)	Colombia	8 – 17	Dominican Republic	Diamante Luis Alberto Villegas, Medellín

17 July 1978; 9:00 (UTC–5)	Cuba	21 – 2 (F/7)	Venezuela	Diamante Luis Alberto Villegas, Medellín

17 July 1978; 12:10 (UTC–5)	Colombia	7 – 11	Nicaragua	Diamante Luis Alberto Villegas, Medellín

17 July 1978; 9:00 (UTC–5)	Dominican Republic	4 – 10	Puerto Rico	Diamante Luis Alberto Villegas, Medellín

18 July 1978; 9:15 (UTC–5)	Colombia	4 – 11	Netherlands Antilles	Diamante Luis Alberto Villegas, Medellín

18 July 1978; 12:00 (UTC–5)	Dominican Republic	7 – 6	Venezuela	Diamante Luis Alberto Villegas, Medellín

18 July 1978; 16:00 (UTC–5)	Puerto Rico	7 – 4	Nicaragua	Diamante Luis Alberto Villegas, Medellín

19 July 1978; 9:10 (UTC–5)	Dominican Republic	9 – 21 (F/7)	Cuba	Diamante Luis Alberto Villegas, Medellín

19 July 1978; 12:10 (UTC–5)	Puerto Rico	20 – 3 (F/7)	Netherlands Antilles	Diamante Luis Alberto Villegas, Medellín

19 July 1978; 15:10 (UTC–5)	Nicaragua	9 – 5	Venezuela	Diamante Luis Alberto Villegas, Medellín

20 July 1978; 9:00 (UTC–5)	Puerto Rico	3 – 5	Colombia	Diamante Luis Alberto Villegas, Medellín

20 July 1978; 12:00 (UTC–5)	Nicaragua	11 – 14	Cuba	Diamante Luis Alberto Villegas, Medellín

20 July 1978; 15:30 (UTC–5)	Venezuela	12 – 1 (F/7)	Netherlands Antilles	Diamante Luis Alberto Villegas, Medellín

21 July 1978; 9:10 (UTC–5)	Dominican Republic	10 – 3	Dominican Republic	Diamante Luis Alberto Villegas, Medellín

21 July 1978; 9:10 (UTC–5)	Venezuela	13 – 5	Colombia	Diamante Luis Alberto Villegas, Medellín

== Final standings ==
Pos	Team	W	L
Gold medal	Cuba	10	0
Silver medal	Nicaragua	9	3
Bronze medal	Puerto Rico	7	5
4	Dominican Republic	5	7
5	Venezuela	5	7
6	Colombia	3	9
7	Netherlands Antilles	1	9

== Statistical leaders ==
Statistic	Name	Total
Batting average	(Cuba) Antonio Muñoz	.714
Hits	(Cuba) Armando Capiro	27
Runs batted in	(Cuba) Cheíto Rodríguez	37
Home runs	(Cuba) Cheíto Rodríguez	15
Stolen bases	(Netherlands Antilles) Henry Jones	3
Wins	4 tied with (Note: Braudilio Vinent (CUB), Juan Olivo (CUB), Rogelio García (CUB), and Julio Moya (NIC))	3
