= Porfi Altamirano =

Nicaraguan baseball player (born 1952)

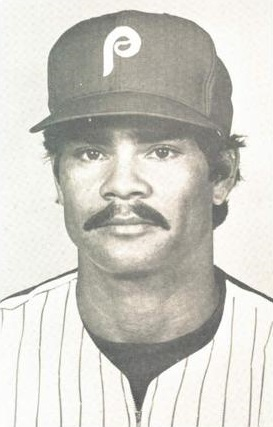
- Pitcher
- Born: May 17, 1952 (age 74); Ciudad Darío, Nicaragua
- Batted: Right Threw: Right

MLB debut
- May 9, 1982, for the Philadelphia Phillies

Last MLB appearance
- June 8, 1984, for the Chicago Cubs

MLB statistics
- Win–loss record: 7–4
- Earned run average: 4.03
- Strikeouts: 57
- Stats at Baseball Reference

Teams
- Philadelphia Phillies (1982–1983); Chicago Cubs (1984)
Medals
Men's baseball
Representing Nicaragua
Baseball World Cup
| Silver medal – second place | 1974 St. Petersburg | Team |
Central American and Caribbean Games
| Silver medal – second place | 1978 Medellín | Team |

Porfirio Altamirano Ramírez (born May 17, 1952), nicknamed "El Guajiro", is a Nicaraguan former professional baseball right-handed middle relief pitcher, who played in Major League Baseball (MLB) for the Philadelphia Phillies (1982–83) and Chicago Cubs (1984). He was inducted into the Nicaraguan Sports Hall of Fame, on August 2, 1994.

Although not equipped with an overpowering arm, Altamirano had an 87–92 MPH fastball and mixed in a slider and an occasional curveball. He was an ideal reliever for a bullpen-by-committee because if his ability to pitch two or three innings at a time, setting the table for a variety of teammates, from Sparky Lyle to Tug McGraw to Lee Smith.

== Early career ==
Born in Ciudad Darío, Nicaragua, Altamirano first became successful in his native country in the 1970s. Debuting with Indios del Bóer of the Primera División in 1972, he pitched most of his career with Estelí, appearing in two finals with them in 1974 and 1978 (though Estelí lost both series). He won two pitching triple crowns (1977 and 1978) and maintained an earned run average below 1.80 in the wood-bat era. He was also a formidable hitter, leading the league in home runs in 1977 (17), considered his best season both on the mound and at the plate. He led the league in wins and in strikeouts five times, as well as two ERA titles; his Nicaraguan league tenure ended in 1978 with a 1.77 career ERA and more than a thousand innings pitched.

As part of the Nicaraguan national team, Altamirano shut out the powerful Cuban team at the 1976 Amateur World Series in Colombia, and at the 1977 Intercontinental Cup, held in Managua, he shut out the USA team; these feats went a long way to his being recognized as one of Nicaragua's best amateur pitchers.

== Major league career ==
Altamirano made his major league debut on May 9, 1982, and played in 60 games over two seasons for the Philadelphia Phillies. He was traded along with Gary Matthews and Bob Dernier from the Phillies to the Cubs for Bill Campbell and Mike Diaz on March 27, 1984. After a 1984 campaign spent mostly with the Iowa Cubs where he went 4–4, he was dealt along with Henry Cotto, Ron Hassey and Rich Bordi from the Cubs to the New York Yankees for Ray Fontenot and Brian Dayett at the Winter Meetings on December 4.

In his three-year MLB career, Altamirano compiled a 7–4 record with 57 strikeouts, a 4.03 earned run average (ERA), two saves, and 91 2/3 innings, in 65 games pitched.

Altamirano also pitched as a closer in the Venezuelan professional league, from 1979 to 1985 for Aguilas de Zulia.

== See also ==
- Players from Nicaragua in MLB
