= Freddy Zamora =

Free agent
- Shortstop
- Born: November 1, 1998 (age 28); Managua, Nicaragua
- Bats: Right Throws: Right
- Stats at Baseball Reference

Freddy Francisco Zamora (born November 1, 1998) is a Nicaraguan professional baseball shortstop who is a free agent.

== Career ==
Zamora attended Miami Killian Senior High School in Kendall, Florida, and played college baseball at the University of Miami. He was drafted by the Milwaukee Brewers in the second round of the 2020 Major League Baseball draft.

Zamora made his professional debut in 2021 with the Carolina Mudcats before being promoted to the Wisconsin Timber Rattlers. In 2026, he played in 51 games with Triple-A Nashville Sounds batting .190/.309/.333 with three home runs, 17 RBI and two stolen bases. He elected free agency on November 2.

Zamora was named to Nicaragua national baseball team for the 2026 World Baseball Classic qualifiers. He went 1-for-8 in the qualifiers, with two RBI and three walks.
