= Rafael Belliard =

Dominican baseball player and coach (born 1961)

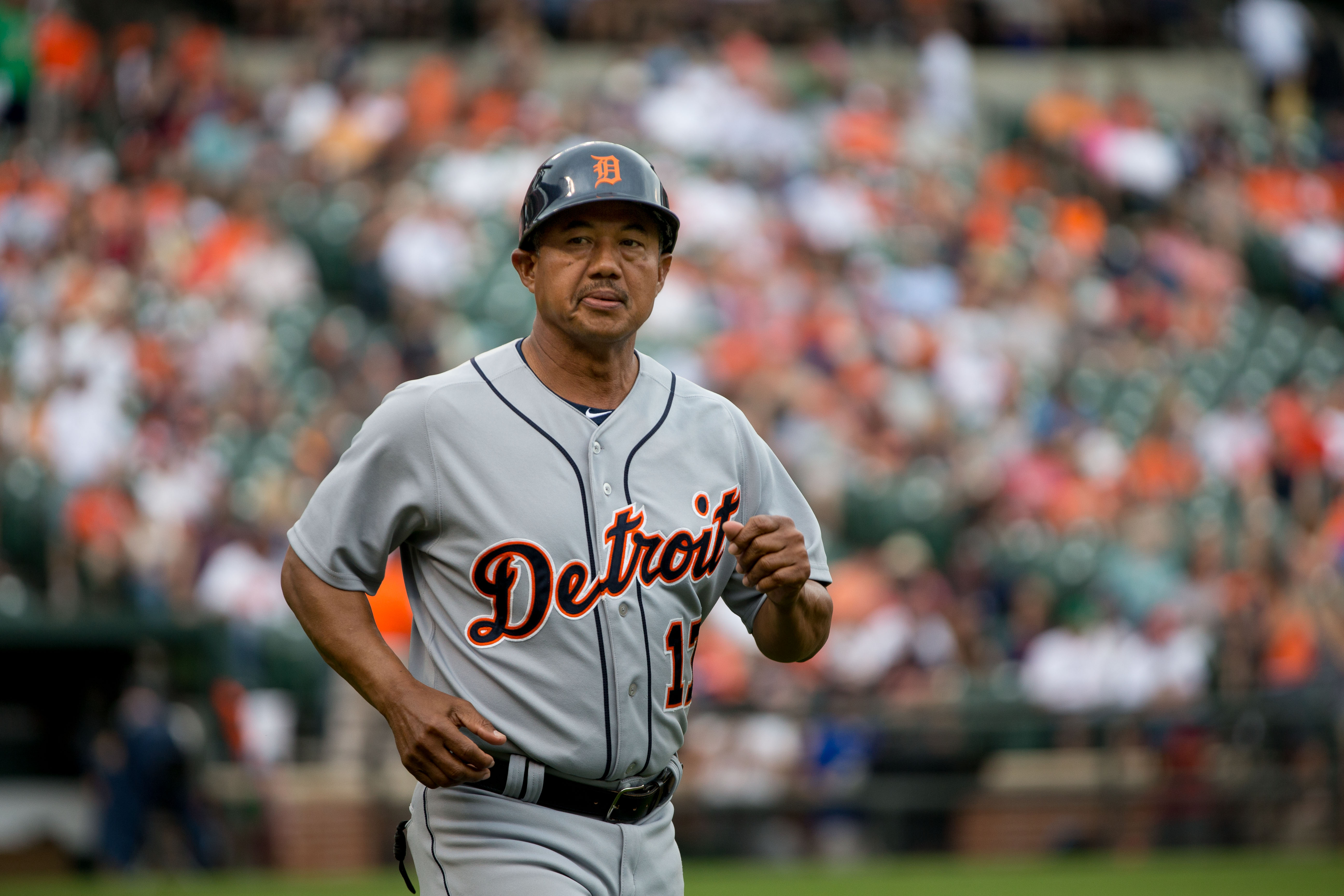
- Belliard as the Detroit Tigers infield coach
- Shortstop
- Born: October 24, 1961 (age 64); Santiago, Dominican Republic
- Batted: Right Threw: Right

MLB debut
- September 6, 1982, for the Pittsburgh Pirates

Last MLB appearance
- April 9, 1998, for the Atlanta Braves

MLB statistics
- Batting average: .221
- Home runs: 2
- Runs batted in: 142
- Stats at Baseball Reference

Teams
- As player: Pittsburgh Pirates (1982–1990); Atlanta Braves (1991–1998); As coach: Detroit Tigers (2006–2013)

Career highlights and awards
- World Series champion (1995)
Medals
Men's baseball
Representing Dominican Republic
Pan American Games
Silver medal – second place	1979 San Juan	Team

Rafael Leonidas Belliard Matias (born October 24, 1961) is a Dominican former professional baseball shortstop who played in Major League Baseball (MLB) from 1982 to 1998 with the Pittsburgh Pirates and Atlanta Braves. He was a member of Atlanta's 1995 World Series winning team against the Cleveland Indians. He served as the infield and first base coach for the Detroit Tigers from 2006 to 2013.

== Playing career ==
Belliard won a silver medal with the Dominican Republic at the 1979 Pan American Games before signing with the Pittsburgh Pirates as an amateur free agent in 1980. He played in the Pirates' minor-league system, reaching the Double-A level in 1982. He made his major-league debut as a pinch runner against the New York Mets on September 6, 1982.

It was not until 1986 that Belliard became a regular in the Pirates' lineup, batting .233 in 117 games. He remained a versatile yet seldom used player until 1990, when he left Pittsburgh and signed a free agent contract with the Atlanta Braves.

Belliard arrived in Atlanta just as the team was emerging as a National League powerhouse. The team made World Series appearances in 1991 and 1992 before finally winning the championship in 1995. Although he had appeared in only 75 games that season, Belliard played shortstop in all six of Atlanta's World Series games.

Belliard made his final major-league appearance on April 9, 1998, in a 4–3 Braves win over the Pirates. He concluded his playing career with the Albany-Colonie Diamond Dogs of the independent Northern League in 1999.

Overall during his professional career, Belliard played in 464 minor-league games over seven seasons, batting .247, and played in 1155 major-league games over 17 seasons, batting .221 and hitting only two home runs. Despite being a weak hitter and below-average base stealer, he was an excellent and reliable fielder during his career.

== Post-playing career ==
After his retirement as a player, Belliard served five seasons in the Braves' minor-league system as a roving fielding instructor. He was named infield coach for the Detroit Tigers on October 11, 2005. He was a uniformed member of Detroit's major league coaching staff through the 2013 season.

On December 5, 2019, Belliard was named a special assignment coach for the Kansas City Royals.

== Personal life ==
While coaching with Detroit, Belliard, his wife Leonora, and son Kevin resided in Boca Raton, Florida. His cousin Ronnie Belliard was also a major-league player.
