= Nicaragua national baseball team =

National men's baseball team of Nicaragua

Information
- Country: Nicaragua
- Federation: Nicaraguan Baseball Federation
- Confederation: WBSC Americas
- Manager: Sandor Guido

WBSC ranking
- Current: 15 ▲1 (26 March 2026)
- Highest: 12 (June 2021)
- Lowest: 17 (December 2022)

Uniforms
Home	Away

Olympic Games
- Appearances: 2 (first in 1984)
- Best result: 4th (1 time, in 1996)

World Baseball Classic
- Appearances: 2 (first in 2023)
- Best result: Pool stage (2023)

World Cup
- Appearances: 30 (first in 1939)
- Best result: (silver) 2nd (5 times, most recent in 1990)

Pan American Games
- Appearances: 5 (first in 1983)
- Best result: (silver) 2nd (2 times, most recent in 1995)

The Nicaragua national baseball team (Spanish: Selección de béisbol de Nicaragua) is the national baseball team of Nicaragua. It represents Nicaragua in international baseball tournaments.

Nicaragua has a long history of international baseball, having made its first appearance at the second Baseball World Cup (then called the Amateur World Series) in 1939. It hosted the BWC/AWS five times and earned five second-place finishes, the last in 1990. It has participated in the Olympic Games twice, in 1984 and 1996. Nicaragua qualified for the World Baseball Classic for the first time in 2023, and also appeared at the tournament in 2026.

In regional competitions, Nicaragua has qualified for the Pan American Games five times, in 1983, 1995, 2007, 2015, and 2019. It is a regular competitor at the Central American and Caribbean Games, and has historically dominated the Central American Games.

== History ==
=== World Baseball Classic era (2013–present) ===
==== 2012–19 ====
Nicaragua first participated in the 2013 World Baseball Classic qualification, held in November 2012 at the Estadio Nacional de Panamá in Panama City. They were assigned to Qualifier 3 alongside Brazil, Colombia, and Panama. The tournament used a double-elimination format and the Nicaraguan team lost against Colombia 1–8 in their opening game and 2–6 to Panama in their second, resulting in their elimination. The Nicaraguan squad was managed by Dennis Martínez, the first Nicaraguan player to reach Major League Baseball.

The Nicaraguan team participated in the 2017 World Baseball Classic qualification, competing in Qualifier 2, in March 2016 at the Estadio B'Air in Mexicali, Mexico. Led by former San Francisco Giants outfielder Marvin Benard, Nicaragua shared the pool with host Mexico, the Czech Republic, and Germany. The qualifier followed a modified double-elimination tournament format. Nicaragua defeated Germany 5–4 in the preliminaries, but lost to Mexico 0–11 in the semifinals. The team had a chance to reach the qualifying game after defeating the Czech Republic 7–6 in the lower final; however, they lost again to Mexico 12–1, and did not secure a place in the 2017 World Baseball Classic.

==== 2020–24 ====
The team failed to qualify for the 2020 Olympics at the eight-team Americas Qualifying Event held in Florida from 31 May through 5 June 2021. Nicaragua finished the first round with a 1–2 record, suffering defeats against the United States (1–7) and the Dominican Republic (3–13 in eight innings); their sole victory was against Puerto Rico 7–6 in extra innings. The team was managed by Marvin Benard.

Nicaragua qualified for the first time in their history to the 2023 World Baseball Classic. They participated in Pool B of the 2023 World Baseball Classic qualification, held from 30 September to 5 October in the Estadio Nacional de Panamá. The tournament used a double-elimination format again. The Nicaraguan team lost to Brazil 1–4 in their first game, defeated Pakistan 12–0 in seven innings in their second game, defeated Argentina 6–5 in their third game, and defeated Brazil 3–1 in their fourth game to secure a spot in the final tournament.

The team competed in the 2023 World Baseball Classic Pool D in 2023 in Miami, Florida, under manager Sandor Guido. They played against the Dominican Republic, Israel, Puerto Rico and Venezuela. Nicaragua finished last in the pool, losing all four of its games.

==== 2025–present ====
In February 2025, Nicaragua played in the 2026 World Baseball Classic qualification in Pool A in the Taipei Dome, against national baseball teams South Africa, Spain, and host Chinese Taipei. They finished the tournament undefeated, and secured a spot in the 2026 final tournament.

Team Nicaragua will compete against Team Israel, Team Dominican Republic, Team Venezuela, and Team Netherlands in the 2026 World Baseball Classic. They will play from March 6-11, 2026, at LoanDepot Park in Miami, Florida, in Pool D. Three-time NL Manager of the Year Dusty Baker will manage Team Nicaragua.

== Current roster ==
Nicaragua roster – 2026 World Baseball Classic qualification
Players		Coaches
Pitchers: 10 Kenword Burton; 72 Leo Crawford; 30 Fidencio Flores; 77 Jesús Garrido; 29 Ernesto Glasgon; 44 Yeris Gonzalez; 41 Osman Gutierrez; 36 Ronald Medrano; 32 Dilmer Mejia; 31 Ángel Obando; 66 J. C. Ramírez; 37 Carlos Teller; 78 Bryan Torres; 88 Axel Zapata	Catchers: 27 Melvin Novoa; 25 Ronald Rivera; Infielders: 1 Benjamin Alegría; 14 Freddvil Chevez; 5 Steven Leyton; 28 Elian Miranda; 48 Elian Rayo; 18 Emanuel Trujillo; 23 Freddy Zamora; Outfielders: 97 Chase Dawson; 45 Omar Mendoza; 99 Juan Montes; 20 José Orozco; 95 Cristhian Sandoval	Manager: 7 Sandor Guido; Coaches: 26 Julio Sánchez (Bench); 56 Len Picota (Pitching); 57 Aníbal Vega (First base); 2 Dorian Garcia (Third base); 4 Cairo Murillo (Bullpen coach); 22 Rodolfo Bone (Bullpen catcher)

== Results and fixtures ==
The following is a list of professional baseball match results currently active in the latest version of the WBSC World Rankings, as well as any future matches that have been scheduled.

Legend

Win Lose Void or postponed Fixture

=== 2022 ===
World Baseball Classic Q	1 October	Brazil	4–1	Nicaragua	Panama City, Panama
World Baseball Classic Q	12:00 CT	WP: Felipe Sales; Sv: Enzo Sawayama (1)	Boxscore	LP: J. C. Ramírez	Attendance: 695; Umpires: HP: Dane Poncsak. 1B: Juan Manuel Rodriguez. 2B: Anthony Perez. 3B: Lisa Turbitt

World Baseball Classic Q	2 October	Pakistan	0–12 (F/7)	Nicaragua	Panama City, Panama
World Baseball Classic Q	12:00 ET	LP: Muhammad Zohaib	Boxscore	WP: Osman Gutierrez; HR: Isaac Benard (1)	Attendance: 495; Umpires: HP: Juan Manuel Rodriguez. 1B: Anthony Perez. 2B: Austin Jones. 3B: Mark Stewart

World Baseball Classic Q	4 October	Argentina	5–6	Nicaragua	Panama City, Panama
World Baseball Classic Q	12:00 CT	LP: Franco Perez; HR: Lucas Stalman (1)	Boxscore	WP: Berman Espinoza; Sv: Roniel Raudes	Attendance: 185; Umpires: HP: Mark Stewart. 1B: Michael Ulloa. 2B: Dane Poncsak. 3B: Juan Manuel Rodriguez

World Baseball Classic Q	5 October	Nicaragua	3–1	Brazil	Panama City, Panama
World Baseball Classic Q	19:00 CT	WP: Osman Gutierrez; Sv: Joaquin Acuna (1)	Boxscore	LP: Heitor Tokar	Attendance: 769; Umpires: HP: Anthony Perez. 1B: Dane Poncsak. 2B: Mark Stewart. 3B: Lisa Turbitt

=== 2023 ===
CAC Games Q	6 February	Honduras	0–7	Nicaragua	Managua, Nicaragua
CAC Games Q	18:30 CT		Boxscore		Attendance: 560

CAC Games Q	7 February	Nicaragua	13–0 (F/7)	Costa Rica	Managua, Nicaragua
CAC Games Q	18:30 CT		Boxscore

CAC Games Q	9 February	El Salvador	0–8	Nicaragua	Managua, Nicaragua
CAC Games Q	18:30 CT		Boxscore

CAC Games Q	10 February	Nicaragua	21–0 (F/7)	Guatemala	Managua, Nicaragua
CAC Games Q	18:30 CT		Boxscore

CAC Games Q	12 February	Honduras	1–13	Nicaragua	Managua, Nicaragua
CAC Games Q	18:30 CT		Boxscore		Attendance: 5,000

World Baseball Classic GS	11 March	Nicaragua	1–9	Puerto Rico	LoanDepot Park, Miami, United States
World Baseball Classic GS	12:00 ET	LP: J. C. Ramírez (0–1); HR: Elian Miranda (1)	Boxscore	WP: Nicholas Padilla (1–0)	Attendance: 35,399; Umpires: HP – Mike Estabrook, 1B – Alejandro Pecero, 2B – Ángel Hernández, 3B – Chris Graham

World Baseball Classic GS	12 March	Nicaragua	1–3	Israel	LoanDepot Park, Miami, United States
World Baseball Classic GS	12:00 ET	LP: Jonathan Loáisiga (0–1)	Boxscore	WP: Richard Bleier (1–0); Sv: Robert Stock (1)	Attendance: 19,955; Umpires: HP – Maikol Tibabijo, 1B – Ron Kulpa, 2B – Tim Meyer, 3B – Andy Fletcher

World Baseball Classic GS	13 March	Dominican Republic	6–1	Nicaragua	LoanDepot Park, Miami, United States
World Baseball Classic GS	12:00 ET	WP: Cristian Javier (1–0); HR: Juan Soto (1), Manny Machado (1)	Boxscore	LP: J. C. Ramírez (0–1)	Attendance: 31,696; Umpires: HP – Chris Graham, 1B – Mike Estabrook, 2B – Maikol Tibabijo, 3B – Ángel Hernández

World Baseball Classic GS	14 March	Nicaragua	1–4	Venezuela	LoanDepot Park, Miami, United States
World Baseball Classic GS	12:00 ET	LP: Rodney Theophile (0–1)	Boxscore	WP: José Ruiz (1–0); Sv: José Alvarado (1)	Attendance: 21,873; Umpires: HP – Ángel Hernández, 1B – Chris Guccione, 2B – Alejandro Pecero, 3B – Tim Meyer

CAC Games GS	24 June	Dominican Republic	6–5 (F/8)	Nicaragua	San Sivar, El Salvador
CAC Games GS	16:30 SV		Boxscore		Attendance: 420

CAC Games GS	25 June	Nicaragua	3–1	Puerto Rico	San Sivar, El Salvador
CAC Games GS	16:30 SV		Boxscore		Attendance: 450

CAC Games GS	26 June	Nicaragua	Canceled	El Salvador	San Sivar, El Salvador
CAC Games GS	20:00 SV		Boxscore

CAC Games GS	27 June	Nicaragua	0–7	Mexico	San Sivar, El Salvador
CAC Games GS	17:30 SV		Boxscore		Attendance: 710

CAC Games GS	28 June	Venezuela	4–1	Nicaragua	San Sivar, El Salvador
CAC Games GS	14:10 SV		Boxscore		Attendance: 250

CAC Games GS	29 June	Curaçao	5–6 (F/8)	Nicaragua	San Sivar, El Salvador
CAC Games GS	18:00 SV		Boxscore		Attendance: 700

CAC Games GS	30 June	Nicaragua	2–8	Cuba	San Sivar, El Salvador
CAC Games GS	12:00 SV		Boxscore		Attendance: 250

=== 2025 ===
World Baseball Classic Q	21 February	South Africa	1–2 (F/10)	Nicaragua	Taipei, Taiwan
World Baseball Classic Q	12:00 UTC+8	LP: Dean Jacobs	Boxscore	WP: Bryan Torres	Attendance: 14,925

World Baseball Classic Q	22 February	Spain	1–2 (F/10)	Nicaragua	Taipei, Taiwan
World Baseball Classic Q	12:00 UTC+8	LP: Rhiner Cruz; HR: Carlos Colmenarez	Boxscore	WP: Yeris González; HR: Brandon Leyton	Attendance: 15,015

World Baseball Classic Q	23 February	Nicaragua	6–0	Chinese Taipei	Taipei, Taiwan
World Baseball Classic Q	19:00 UTC+8	WP: Dilmer Mejía	Boxscore	LP: Hsu Shiang-sheng	Attendance: 35,565

Central Am Games RR	24 October	Nicaragua	11–0	Honduras	Guate, Guatemala
Central Am Games RR	14:00 UTC−6		Boxscore

Central Am Games RR	26 October	El Salvador	0–10	Nicaragua	Guate, Guatemala
Central Am Games RR	18:00 UTC−6		Boxscore

Central Am Games RR	27 October	Nicaragua	12–0	Costa Rica	Guate, Guatemala
Central Am Games RR	14:00 UTC−6		Boxscore

Central Am Games RR	28 October	Guatemala	1–7	Nicaragua	Guate, Guatemala
Central Am Games RR	18:00 UTC−6		Boxscore

=== 2026 ===
World Baseball Classic GS	6 March	Nicaragua	3–12	Dominican Republic	LoanDepot Park, Miami, United States
World Baseball Classic GS	19:00 UTC−5	LP: Stiven Cruz (0-1)	Boxscore	WP: Seranthony Domínguez (1-0); HR: Junior Caminero (1), Oneil Cruz (1), Julio Rodríguez (1)	Attendance: 35,127; Umpires: HP – Paul Clemons, 1B – Lance Barksdale, 2B – Serge Makouchetchev, 3B – Marek Vicar

World Baseball Classic GS	7 March	Nicaragua	3–4	Netherlands	LoanDepot Park, Miami, United States
World Baseball Classic GS	12:00 UTC−5	LP: Ángel Obando (0-1); HR: Jeter Downs (1)	Boxscore	WP: Lars Huijer (1-0); HR: Ozzie Albies (1)	Attendance: 16,897; Umpires: HP – Trent Thomas, 1B – Quinn Wolcott, 2B – Shane Livensparger, 3B – Alejandro Percero

World Baseball Classic GS	8 March	Nicaragua	0–5	Israel	LoanDepot Park, Miami, United States
World Baseball Classic GS	19:00 UTC−4	LP: Carlos Rodríguez (0-1)	Boxscore	WP: Dean Kremer (1-0)	Attendance: 17,972; Umpires: HP – Alejandro Percero, 1B – Quinn Wolcott, 2B – Shane Livensparger, 3B – Trent Thomas

World Baseball Classic GS	9 March	Venezuela	4–0	Nicaragua	LoanDepot Park, Miami, United States
World Baseball Classic GS	19:00 UTC−4	WP: Yoendrys Gómez (1-0); HR: Ronald Acuña Jr. (1)	Boxscore	LP: Danilo Bermúdez (0-1)	Attendance: 27,844; Umpires: HP – Paul Clemons, 1B – Alejandro Percero, 2B – Lance Barksdale, 3B – Trent Thomas

WBSC Premier12 Q	26 November	Nicaragua	v	Great Britain	Zhongshan, China
WBSC Premier12 Q	12:00 UTC+8

WBSC Premier12 Q	27 November	Czech Republic	v	Nicaragua	Zhongshan, China
WBSC Premier12 Q	12:00 UTC+8

WBSC Premier12 Q	28 November	China	v	Nicaragua	Zhongshan, China
WBSC Premier12 Q	18:30 UTC+8

== Tournament results ==
=== World Baseball Classic ===
World Baseball Classic record							Qualification record			
Year	Round	Position	W	L	RS	RA	W	L	RS	RA
2006	Did not enter						No qualifiers held			
2009	Did not enter						No qualifiers held			
2013	Did not qualify						0	2	3	14
2017	Did not qualify						2	2	13	33
(United States) 2023	Round 1	19th	0	4	4	22	3	1	22	10
(United States) 2026	Round 1	18th	0	4	6	25	3	0	10	2
Total	Round 1	2/6	0	8	10	47	8	5	48	59

Nicaragua World Baseball Classic Record by Opponent
Opponent	Tournaments met	W-L record	Largest victory		Largest defeat		Current streak
Opponent	Tournaments met	W-L record	Score	Tournament	Score	Tournament	Current streak
Dominican Republic	2	0–2	–		12–3	United States 2026	L2
Israel	2	0–2	–		5–0	United States 2026	L2
Netherlands	1	0–1	–		4–3	United States 2026	L1
Puerto Rico	1	0–1	–		9–1	United States 2023	L1
Venezuela	2	0–2	–		4–0	United States 2026	L2
Overall	2	0–8	–		Against DR		L8
Overall	2	0–8	–		12–3	United States 2026	L8

Nicaragua WBC Qualification Record by Opponent
Opponent	Tournaments met	W-L record	Largest victory		Largest defeat		Current streak
Opponent	Tournaments met	W-L record	Score	Tournament	Score	Tournament	Current streak
Argentina	1	1–0	6–5	Panama 2023	–		W1
Brazil	1	1–1	3–1	Panama 2023	4–1	Panama 2023	W1
Chinese Taipei	1	1–0	6–0	Taiwan 2026	–		W1
Colombia	1	0–1	–		8–1	Panama 2013	L1
Czech Republic	1	1–0	7–6 (F/11)	Mexico 2017	–		W1
Germany	1	1–0	5–4 (F/10)	Mexico 2017	–		W1
Mexico	1	0–2	–		11–0 (F/7)	Mexico 2017	L2
Pakistan	1	1–0	12–0 (F/7)	Panama 2023	–		W1
Panama	1	0–1	–		6–2	Panama 2013	L1
South Africa	1	1–0	2–1 (F/10)	Taiwan 2026	–		W1
Spain	1	1–0	2–1 (F/10)	Taiwan 2026	–		W1
Overall	4	8–5	Against PAK		Against MEX		W6
Overall	4	8–5	12–0 (F/7)	Panama 2023	11–0 (F/7)	Mexico 2017	W6

=== Olympic Games ===
Summer Olympics record								Qualification
Year	Round	Position	W	L	%	RS	RA	Qualification
(United States) 1984	Preliminary	5th (tied) (Note: No medals awarded; tournament was a demonstration sport only)	1	2	.333	11	29	1983 Pan American Games
(Spain) 1992	Did not qualify							Did not qualify
(United States) 1996	Bronze Match	4th	4	5	.444	48	48	1995 Pan American Games
(Australia) 2000	Did not qualify							Did not qualify
(Greece) 2004	Did not qualify							Did not qualify
(China) 2008	Did not qualify							Did not qualify
(Japan) 2020	Did not qualify							Did not qualify
(United States) 2028	Did not qualify							Did not qualify
Total (Note: Totals only include years 1992 to 2008 and 2020, during which baseball was an official medal sport.)	1/5		4	5	.444	48	48	

The team tried but failed to qualify for the 2020 Olympics at the Americas Qualifying Event on May 31 through June 5, 2021.

=== Baseball World Cup ===
Amateur World Series & Baseball World Cup record
Year	Result	Position	Pld	W	L	%	RS	RA	Org.
(United Kingdom) 1938	Did not enter								IBF
(Cuba) 1939	Single-table tournament	2nd	6	3	3	.500			IBF
(Cuba) 1940	Single-table tournament	2nd (Note: Tied with United States)	12	9	3	.750			IBF
(Cuba) 1941	Single-table tournament	7th	8	2	6	.250			IBF
(Cuba) 1942	Did not enter								IBF
(Cuba) 1943	Did not enter								IBF
(Venezuela) 1944	Single-table tournament	8th	7	1	6	.143			FIBA
(Venezuela) 1945	Single-table tournament	4th	10	5	5	.500			FIBA
(Colombia) 1947	Single-table tournament	3rd	8	6	2	.750			FIBA
(Nicaragua) 1948	Single-table tournament	7th	7	1	6	.143			FIBA
(Nicaragua) 1950	Single-table tournament	5th	11	7	4	.636			FIBA
(Mexico) 1951	Single-table tournament	5th	10	6	4	.600			FIBA
(Cuba) 1952	Single-table tournament	5th	11	6	5	.545			FIBA
(Venezuela) 1953	Single-table tournament	3rd	10	7	3	.700			FIBA
(Costa Rica) 1961	Single-table tournament	9th	4	1	3	.250			FIBA
(Colombia) 1965	Single-table tournament	6th	8	4	4	.500			FIBA
(Dominican Republic) 1969	Single-table tournament	5th	10	4	6	.400			FIBA
(Colombia) 1970	Single-table tournament	7th	11	4	7	.364			FIBA
(Cuba) 1971	Single-table tournament	3rd	9	6	3	.667			FIBA
(Nicaragua) 1972	Single-table tournament	3rd	15	13	2	.867			FIBA
(Cuba) 1973	Did not enter								FIBA
(Nicaragua) 1973	Single-table tournament	2nd	10	8	2	.800			FEMBA
(United States) 1974	Single-table tournament	2nd	8	7	1	.875			FEMBA
(Colombia) 1976	Single-table tournament	4th	10	7	3	.700			AINBA
(Italy) 1978	Single-table tournament	5th	10	6	4	.600			AINBA
(Japan) 1980	Did not enter								AINBA
(South Korea) 1982	Did not enter								IBAF
(Cuba) 1984	Single-table tournament	7th	13	5	8	.385			IBAF
(Netherlands) 1986	Did not enter								IBAF
(Italy) 1988	First round	7th	13	5	6	.455			IBAF
(Canada) 1990	Finals	2nd	10	5	5	.500			IBAF
(Nicaragua) 1994	Third place game	4th	10	7	3	.700			IBAF
(Italy) 1998	Third place game	3rd	10	7	3	.700			IBAF
(Taiwan) 2001	Group stage	9th	7	4	3	.571			IBAF
(Cuba) 2003	Fifth place game	6th	9	5	4	.556			IBAF
(Netherlands) 2005	Fifth place game	6th	11	7	4	.636			IBAF
(Taiwan) 2007	Did not enter								IBAF
(Italy) 2009	Second round	13th	10	5	5	.500			IBAF
(Panama) 2011	Group stage	14th	7	1	6	.143			IBAF
Total	5 Silver	30/39	—	—	—	—	—	—	

=== Pan American Games ===
- 1983 : (silver) 2nd
- 1995 : (silver) 2nd
- 2007 : (bronze) 3rd
- 2019 : (bronze) 3rd
- 2023 : Did not qualify

=== Intercontinental Cup ===
- 1973 : 4th
- 1975 : (bronze) 3rd
- 1977 : 4th
- 1979 : 4th
- 1983 : 6th
- 1985 : 7th
- 1987 : 7th
- 1989 : (bronze) 3rd
- 1991 : (bronze) 3rd
- 1993 : 4th
- 1995 : (bronze) 3rd

=== Central American and Caribbean Games ===
- 1935 : (silver) 2nd
- 1938 : (bronze) 3rd
- 1950 : (bronze) 3rd
- 1978 : (silver) 2nd
- 1998 : (silver) 2nd
- 2010 : (bronze) 3rd
- 2014 : (silver) 2nd
- 2018 : 5th
- 2023 : 6th

=== Central American Games ===
- 1977 : (gold) 1st
- 1986 : (gold) 1st
- 1990 : (silver) 2nd
- 1994 : (gold) 1st
- 1997 : (silver) 2nd
- 2001 : (gold) 1st
- 2006 : (gold) 1st
- 2010 : (silver) 2nd
- 2013 : (gold) 1st
- 2017 : (gold) 1st
- 2025 : (gold) 1st

== Managers ==
Manager	Nat.	Years active	Competitions	Ref.
Ramón Méndez	(Cuba)	1935–1944	1935 Central American and Caribbean Games — Runners-up; 1939 Amateur World Series — Runners-up; 1940 Amateur World Series — Runners-up; 1941 Amateur World Series — 7th place 1944 Amateur World Series — 7th place	
Fernando Vicioso	(Dominican Republic)	1938	1938 Central American and Caribbean Games — Runners-up	
Ponciano Lombillo	(Cuba)	1945–1950	1945 Amateur World Series — 4th place 1950 Central American and Caribbean Games — 3rd place	
Juan Ealo	(Cuba)	1947–1948	1947 Amateur World Series — 3rd place 1948 Amateur World Series — resigned	
Anastasio Somoza	(Nicaragua)	1948	1948 Amateur World Series — 7th place	(Note: FENIBA alternatively lists Carlos Navas and Stanley Cayasso as player-managers for the rest of the 1948 series.)
Andrew Espolita	(United States)	1950	1950 Amateur World Series — 5th place 1951 Pan American Games — 4th place 1951 Amateur World Series — 5th place	
Carlos Navas	(Nicaragua)	1952	1952 Amateur World Series — 5th place	
Francisco Davila	(Nicaragua)	1953	1953 Amateur World Series — 3rd place	
Cheo Ramos	(Cuba)	1954	1954 Central American and Caribbean Games — Runners-up	
Carlos Quiroz	(Nicaragua)	1961	1961 Amateur World Series — 7th place	
Stanley Cayasso	(Nicaragua)	1959–1969	1959 Pan American Games — 4th place 1965 Amateur World Series — 6th place 1969 Amateur World Series — 6th place	
Nicolas Bolaños	(Nicaragua)	1970	1970 Amateur World Series — 7th place	
Heberto Portobanco	(Nicaragua)	1971–1993	1971 Pan American Games — 8th place 1971 Amateur World Series — 3rd place 1978 Amateur World Series — 5th place 1993 Intercontinental Cup — 4th place	
Argelio Córdoba	(Cuba)	1972–1991	1972 Amateur World Series — 3rd place 1973 Intercontinental Cup — 3rd place 1973 FEMBA Amateur World Series — Runners-up; 1975 Intercontinental Cup — 3rd place 1978 Central American and Caribbean Games — Runners-up; 1987 Pan American Games — 5th place 1991 Intercontinental Cup — 3rd place 1991 Pan American Games — withdrew	
Noel Areas	(Nicaragua)	1974–2015	1974 FEMBA Amateur World Series — Runners-up; 1976 Amateur World Series — 4th place 1977 Intercontinental Cup — 3rd place 1977 Central American Games — Champions; 1982 Central American and Caribbean Games — 5th place 1983 Pan American Games — 6th place 1984 Summer Olympics; 1984 Amateur World Series — 7th place 1986 Central American Games — Champions; 1986 Central American and Caribbean Games — 5th place 1998 Baseball World Cup — 3rd place 1998 Central American and Caribbean Games — Runners-up; 2003 Pan American Games — 4th place 2003 Baseball World Cup — 6th place 2013 Central American Games — Champions; 2014 Central American and Caribbean Games — Runners-up; 2015 Pan American Games — 6th place	
Iván Ulloa	(Nicaragua)	1979	1979 Intercontinental Cup — 5th place	
César Jarqín	(Nicaragua)	1985	1985 Intercontinental Cup — 7th place 1985 Copa Simón Bolívar — 5th place	
Davis Hodgson	(Nicaragua)	1987–2009	1987 Intercontinental Cup — 7th place 1990 Central American Games — Runners-up; 2009 Baseball World Cup — 11th place 2010 Central American Games — Runners-up; 2010 Central American and Caribbean Games — 3rd place	
Omar Cisneros	(Nicaragua)	1988–2002	1988 Baseball World Cup — 7th place 1990 Baseball World Cup — Runners-up; 1991 Pan American Games — 5th place 2002 Central American and Caribbean Games — 4th place 2006 Central American Games — Champions; 2006 Central American and Caribbean Games — 7th place 2007 Pan American Games — 3rd place 2008 Copa América — 2nd place	
Róger Acevedo	(Nicaragua)	1979	1993 Central American and Caribbean Games — 4th place	
Ramiro Toruño	(Nicaragua)	1994	1994 Central American Games — Champions; 1994 Baseball World Cup — 4th place	
Julio Sánchez	(Nicaragua)	1995—2019	1995 Pan American Games — Runners-up; 1995 Pacific Ocean Games — Champions; 1995 Intercontinental Cup — 3rd place 1996 Summer Olympics — 4th place 2001 Baseball World Cup — 9th place 2001 Central American Games — Champions; 2010 Intercontinental Cup — 7th place 2017 Central American Games — Champions; 2018 Central American and Caribbean Games — 5th place 2019 Pan American Games — withdrew	
Alex Torres	(Nicaragua)	1997	1997 Intercontinental Cup — 5th place 1997 Central American Games — Runners-up	
Dennis Martínez	(Nicaragua)	1999–2011	1999 Pan American Games — 4th place 2011 Baseball World Cup — 13th place	
Jorge Fuentes	(Cuba)	2005	2005 Baseball World Cup — 6th place	
Marvin Benard	(Nicaragua)	2016–2022	2017 World Baseball Classic qualifiers — did not qualify 2023 World Baseball Classic qualifiers — qualified	
Sandor Guido	(Nicaragua)	2019–2025	2019 Pan American Games — 3rd place 2023 World Baseball Classic — Relegated to qualifiers 2026 World Baseball Classic qualifiers — qualified	
Dusty Baker	(United States)	2026	2026 World Baseball Classic — Relegated to qualifiers	

== See also ==
- List of Major League Baseball players from Nicaragua
