= Brandon Leytón =

Nicaraguan baseball player (born 1998)

Dantos de Managua – No. 5
- Infielder
- Born: 17 December 1998 (age 27); León, Nicaragua
- Bats: Right Throws: Right
- Stats at Baseball Reference
Medals
Men's baseball
Representing Nicaragua
Central American and Caribbean Games
Silver medal – second place	2026 Santo Domingo	Team

Brandon Steven Leytón Olivas (born December 17, 1998) is a Nicaraguan professional baseball infielder who is a free agent. Leytón represents the Nicaragua national baseball team in international competition, including at the 2023 World Baseball Classic.

== Professional career ==
=== Arizona Diamondbacks ===
The son of former baseball player Reymundo Leytón, who played on the Nicaraguan national team, was discovered by Julio Sánchez, manager of the Nicaraguan national team and scout for the Arizona Diamondbacks. He was officially signed as an international free agent by Diamondbacks scout Junior Noboa on January 26, 2016.

He made his professional debut with the Dominican Summer League Diamondbacks, hitting .218/.321/.249 with 22 RBI over 56 appearances. In 2017, Leytón split time between the DSL Diamondbacks and the rookie-level Missoula Osprey of the Pioneer League, batting .277/.325/.423 with four home runs, 24 RBI, and five stolen bases.

Leytón spent all of 2018 with Missoula, batting .274/.309/.419 with six home runs, 34 RBI, and eight stolen bases. He split his 2019 season between the Low-A Hillsboro Hops and Single-A Kane County Cougars, hitting a combined .222/.302/.320 with four home runs, 20 RBI, and four stolen bases while being caught four times. Leytón did not play in a game in 2020 due to the cancellation of the minor league season because of the COVID-19 pandemic.

=== Cincinnati Reds ===
On December 10, 2010, Leytón was selected by the Cincinnati Reds in the minor league phase of the Rule 5 draft. He played with the Single-A Daytona Tortugas in 2021, slashing .248/.296/.393 with six home runs, 36 RBI, and four stolen bases over 80 games. In 2022, Leytón split the year between the Single-A Daytona Tortugas, Dayton, the Double-A Chattanooga Lookouts, and Triple-A Louisville Bats. In 84 appearances for the four affiliates, he slashed a cumulative .250/.274/.471 with 11 home runs, 47 RBI, and six stolen bases.

Leytón returned to Chattanooga and Louisville in 2023, but played in only 10 games due to a left hamstring strain. In 26 plate appearances during those games, he went 4-for-23 (.174) with one RBI. Leytón elected free agency following the season on November 6, 2023.

=== Winter leagues ===
Leytón played with the Leones de León of the Nicaraguan Professional Baseball League during the 2018–19 season, when they won the championship. More recently, he has played with the Tigres de Chinandega during the regular LBPN season. Nevertheless, he rejoined the Leones team representing Nicaragua at the 2025 Serie de las Américas, where he was named to the all-tournament team.

Leytón has also played with Tigres de Chinandega in the Germán Pomares Championship, Nicaragua's summer league. At the 2025 Baseball Champions League Americas, he batted .438, going 7-for-16 with two doubles and two home runs in three games.

== International career ==
Leytón represents the Nicaragua national baseball team in international competition. At the Americas Qualifying Event for the 2020 Summer Olympics being held in Tokyo in 2021, he posted two hits in nine at-bats. Going into the qualifiers for the 2023 World Baseball Classic, Leytón was considered the best player on the Nicaraguan national team, which was trying to earn its first ever berth in the tournament. He was selected for Nicaragua's 2023 World Baseball Classic roster, registered under the name Steven Leytón. He registered three hits in thirteen at-bats, with one double, one walk, and three strikeouts. Nicaragua was eliminated from the tournament, and would be forced to re-qualify for the 2026 World Baseball Classic.

In February 2025, Leytón was chosen to represent Nicaragua at the 2026 World Baseball Classic qualification. He batted .385, with six hits in thirteen at-bats across Nicaragua's three victories. One of his hits was a solo home run in the 2–1 victory over Spain. He was named one of the ten standout players from the qualifiers by MLB.com, helping Nicaragua qualify to the 2026 tournament undefeated.
