= Carlos Ponce (baseball) =

Puerto Rican baseball player (born 1959)

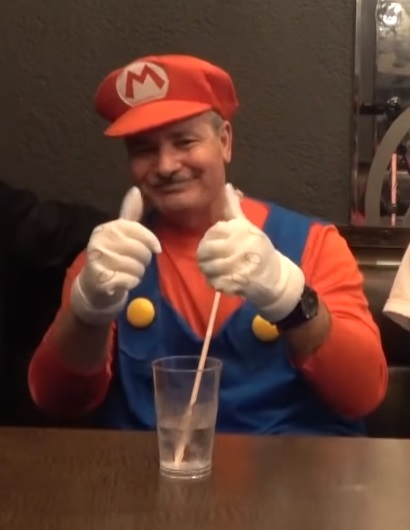

Wei Chuan Dragons – No. 75
- First baseman / Coach
- Born: February 7, 1959 (age 66); Río Piedras, Puerto Rico
- Batted: Right Threw: Right

Professional debut
- MLB: August 14, 1985, for the Milwaukee Brewers
- NPB: April 4, 1986, for the Yokohama Taiyo Whales

Last appearance
- MLB: October 6, 1985, for the Milwaukee Brewers
- NPB: June 17, 1990, for the Yokohama Taiyo Whales

MLB statistics
- Batting average: .161
- Home runs: 1
- Runs batted in: 5

NPB statistics
- Batting average: .297
- Home runs: 119
- Runs batted in: 389
- Stats at Baseball Reference

Teams
- As player: Milwaukee Brewers (1985); Yokohama Taiyo Whales (1986–1990); As coach: Wei Chuan Dragons (2020–present)
Medals
Men's baseball
Representing Puerto Rico
Pan American Games
Bronze medal – third place	1979 San Juan	Team
Central American and Caribbean Games
Bronze medal – third place	1978 Medellín	Team

Carlos Antonio Ponce Diaz (born February 7, 1959) is a Puerto Rican former professional baseball first baseman who is currently coach for the Wei Chuan Dragons of the Chinese Professional Baseball League (CPBL).

== Career ==
He signed with the Milwaukee Brewers of Major League Baseball (MLB) as a free agent in 1982 and played with the team at the Major League level in 1985.

From 1986–1990, Ponce played with the Yokohama Taiyo Whales of the Nippon Professional Baseball (NPB). He had a .296 career average and a .555 slugging percentage, belting 119 home runs and compiling 389 runs batted in.
