= Jesús Marriaga =

Colombian baseball player (born 1986)

Saraperos de Saltillo
- Outfielder
- Born: December 17, 1998 (age 27); Cartagena, Colombia
- Bats: Right Throws: Right
Medals
Men's baseball
Representing Colombia
Pan American Games
Gold medal – first place	2023 Santiago	Team
U-23 World Cup
Bronze medal – third place	2020 Hermosillo	Team
Bolivarian Games
Gold medal – first place	2025 Lima-Ayacucho	Team
Junior Pan American Games
Gold medal – first place	2021 Cali-Valle	Team

Jesús Adalberto Marriaga Montalvo (born December 17, 1998) is a Colombian professional baseball outfielder for the Saraperos de Saltillo of the Mexican League. He represents the Colombia national baseball team in international competition, including at the 2023 World Baseball Classic.

== Professional career ==
=== Arizona Diamondbacks ===
On January 13, 2016, the Arizona Diamondbacks signed Marriaga to a minor league contract. He was assigned to the Dominican Summer League Diamondbacks, playing in 64 games and slashing .299/.391/.376 with 23 RBI and 25 stolen bases. In 2017, he was promoted to the rookie-level AZL Diamondbacks of the Arizona Complex League, slashing .205/.299/.297 with 15 RBI and 11 stolen bases. In 43 games with the rookie-level Missoula Osprey of the Pioneer League in 2018, he improved to a 271/.351/.312 slash line with 10 RBI and 12 stolen bases.

Marriaga was promoted to the Low-A Hillsboro Hops for the 2019 season, hitting .244/.374/.350 with one home run, 27 RBI, and 17 stolen bases. He did not play in a game in 2020 due to the cancellation of the minor league season because of the COVID-19 pandemic. Marriaga was released by the Diamondbacks organization on January 8, 2021.

=== Gary SouthShore RailCats ===
Marriaga signed with the Gary SouthShore RailCats of the independent American Association of Professional Baseball for the 2021 season. In his first season with the RailCats, he posted a .284/.348/.356 slash line over 80 games. The next season, he improved to .307/.379/.454 over 71 games. In his 2023 season with Gary, Marriaga played in 98 games with the RailCats, posting a .281/.362/.443 slash line. That year, he led the team in RBI, with 66, and was named an American Association All-Star. He re-signed with the RailCats for the 2024 season, but did not play due to visa issues.

=== Saraperos de Saltillo ===
On September 26, 2024, the Saraperos de Saltillo of the Mexican League announced they had signed Marriaga for the 2025 season.

== International career ==
Marriaga represents the Colombian national baseball team. He was selected for Colombia's 2023 World Baseball Classic roster. He went hitless in three at-bats, with one walk and two strikeouts. The Colombian team was eliminated from the tournament, and would be forced to re-qualify for the 2026 World Baseball Classic.

Marriaga played with Colombia at the 2026 World Baseball Classic qualifiers, held in March 2025 in Tucson, Arizona. In 12 at-bats, he registered six hits and seven RBI, leading the team in batting average (.500) and OPS (1.365). He was named one of the 10 standout players from the qualifiers by MLB.com, which opined that Marriaga gave an MVP-level performance, helping Colombia qualify to the 2026 tournament undefeated.
