= Santiago Mederos (baseball) =

Cuban baseball player

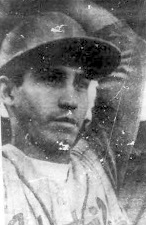
- Pitcher
- Born: 8 September 1944; Havana, Cuba
- Died: 15 December 1979 (aged 35); Havana, Cuba
- Batted: Left Threw: Left
Medals
Men's baseball
Amateur World Series
Gold medal – first place	1970 Bogotá	Team
Gold medal – first place	1971 Havana	Team
Gold medal – first place	1972 Managua	Team
Gold medal – first place	1976 Bogotá	Team
Central American and Caribbean Games
Gold medal – first place	1970 Panama City	Team
Gold medal – first place	1978 Medellín	Team
Pan American Games
Gold medal – first place	1975 Mexico City	Team
International Amateur Tournament
Silver medal – second place	1968 Mexico City	Team

Santiago Mederos Iglesias (September 8, 1944 – December 15, 1979) was a baseball player in the Cuban National Series during the 1960s and 1970s. Nicknamed Changa, he played 15 seasons, mainly with Industriales, and Agricultores.

Mederos set the single-season record for wins (17) and strikeouts (208) for a left-handed pitcher, both marks that he posted while playing with Habana in the 1968–69 season. (The strikeout record would later be broken by Maels Rodríguez in the 2000–01 season.)

== Career ==
Mederso played youth baseball with the Cubanitos, the development program for the Triple-A Havana Sugar Kings of the International League. He initially played as an outfielder, but converted to pitching after the Havana team relocated to become the Jersey City Jerseys in 1960 (in the aftermath of the Cuban Revolution) as the young Mederos stayed in Cuba. He made his senior level debut at 19 years old in the third 1963–64 Cuban National Series, with the Occidentales club managed by Gil Torres. His first three seasons he only won one game and suffered five losses; his fortunes improved with the 1967-1968 season, posting a 13-5 record and a 1.47 ERA.

Mederos spent 15 years in the league, posting a career record of 123–67 with a 1.97 ERA. He set and tied numerous league records during his career, including shutouts in a season (eight in 1967–1968, tied with Carlos Gálvez). In 1968–1969, he led the league with 208 strikeouts, setting a new record. He also set the single-game record for strikeouts with 20. Following the 1968–1969 season, he was named the Serie Nacional Most Valuable Pitcher. His two strikeout records have been broken, his shutout record has been tied, but not broken. In the 1969–70 season, he nearly threw a no-hitter against Oriente in the first game of a double-header on January 7, 1970, broken up in the ninth inning; remarkably, his teammate Rigo Betancourt would successful no-hit Oriente in the second game of the double-header.

He also pitched for Cuba's national team in multiple tournaments. He worked for the team in the 1970 Central American and Caribbean Games, in which Cuba won gold; the 1970 Amateur World Series, in which Cuba took gold; the 1971 Amateur World Series, in which Cuba took gold; the 1972 Amateur World Series, in which Cuba took gold; the 1975 Pan American Games, in which Cuba took gold; the 1976 Amateur World Series, in which Cuba took gold and the 1978 Central American and Caribbean Games, in which Cuba took gold.

== Death ==
He died in a car accident in 1979.
