= Nemesio Porras =

Nicaraguan baseball player (born 1968)

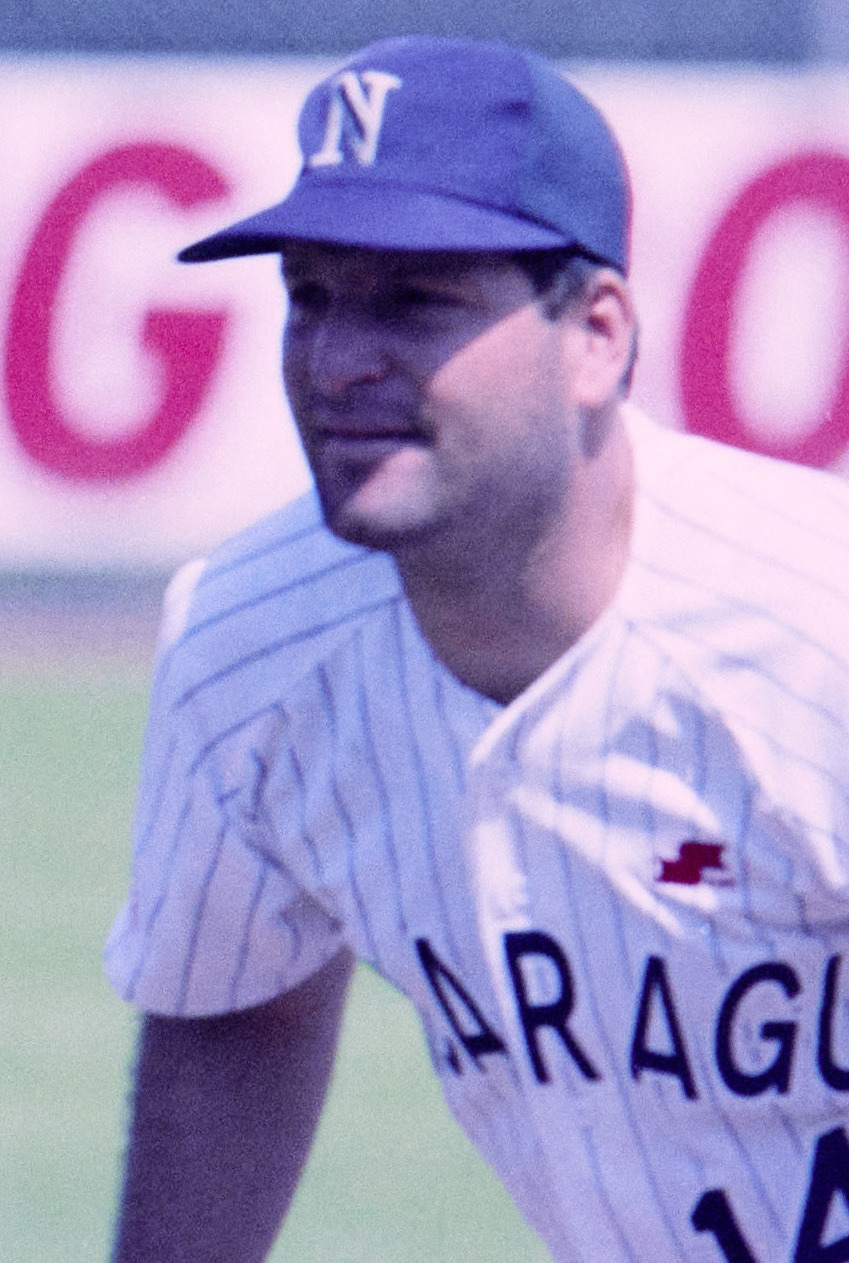
- First baseman
- Born: October 7, 1968 (age 57); Managua, Nicaragua
- Bats: Unknown Throws: Left
Medals
Men's baseball
Representing Nicaragua
Baseball World Cup
Silver medal – second place	1990 Edmonton	Team
Bronze medal – third place	1998 Italy	Team
Intercontinental Cup
Bronze medal – third place	1991 Barcelona	Team
Bronze medal – third place	1995 Havana	Team
Central American Games
Gold medal – first place	1986 Guatemala City	Team
Gold medal – first place	1994 San Salvador	Team
Pacific Ocean Games
Gold medal – first place	1995 Cali	Team

Nemesio Guillermo Porras López (born October 7, 1968) is a Nicaraguan baseball administrator and former player. Nicknamed "El Sucio" ("The Dirty One"), he was considered one of the best Nicaraguan players of his generation. Since 2012, he has served as president of the Nicaraguan Baseball Federation (FENIBA).

== Playing career ==
Porras debuted in the Germán Pomares Championship in 1985 with the Industriales COIP club; the following year he moved to Indios del Bóer. Starting with the 1986 season, he hit over .300 for 19 consecutive seasons. from 1986 to 2005. On six occasions, he won the Pomares batting title (1992, 1993, 1994, 1996, and 1998). He also led the league in runs batted in on four occasions. Porras finished his Pomares career with a 1,772 hits and a .354 batting average (a record surpassed by Ofilio Castro), including a .365 average during the aluminum bat era and .318 after the Pomares switched back to wooden bats. He won four Pomares championships with Bóer.

He also played with the Nicaragua national baseball team over the course of 14 years, participating in 22 tournaments and working to an batting average of .333 in international play. He made his international debut at the 1987 Pan American Games in Indianapolis. He participated in three Baseball World Cup tournaments: 1990 in Edmonton (batting .345 and winning a silver medal); 1994 in Nicaragua (batting .333); and 1998 in Italy (hitting .286). At the 1996 Summer Olympics in Atlanta, he hit .294. His last international play was during the 2000 Pan American Championship in Panama, helping Nicaragua qualify for the 2001 Baseball World Cup.

Porras himself said he was never offered a major league contract, but Orlando Hernández later described Porras as one of the best players he faced while playing with Cuba, adding that Porras "in all certainty" could have made it to the majors.

== Post-playing career ==
Porras was elected vice president of the Nicaraguan Baseball Federation (FENIBA) in 2009. He assumed presidency of the federation in 2012, after the resignation of Police Commissioner Adolfo Marenco.

As president of FENIBA, he helped usher in Nicaragua's first appearance in the Caribbean Series in the 2024 Caribbean Series tournament in Miami.

Porras also served as president of the Pan American Baseball Confederation (COPABE), and has been a members of the WBSC Baseball Executive Committee. He is also a vice president of the Baseball Association of the Americas (ABAM), which organizes the Serie de las Américas.

He has been criticized for his closeness with the regime of Nicaraguan dictator Daniel Ortega. In 2017, media outlets floated Porras as a potential Sandinista candidate for mayor of Managua, and Porras said he would accept if nominated. Porras has praised Ortega's support of baseball in the past. However, he has also described himself as apolitical.
