= Baseball at the 1995 Pan American Games =

- Venue: Mar del Plata, Argentina
- Competitors: 10 teams

Medalists
Gold medal	Cuba
Silver medal	Nicaragua
Bronze medal	Puerto Rico

Baseball at the 1995 Pan American Games was contested between teams representing Argentina, Brazil, Cuba, Guatemala, Mexico, Netherlands Antilles, Nicaragua, Panama, Puerto Rico, and the United States. The 1995 edition was the 12th Pan American Games, and was hosted by Mar del Plata.

Cuba entered the competition as the six-time defending champions, having won each gold medal dating back to 1971. They successfully defended their title, with Nicaragua finishing second.

== Medal summary ==
=== Medal table ===
Rank	Nation	Gold	Silver	Bronze	Total
1	Cuba	1	0	0	1
2	Nicaragua	0	1	0	1
3	Puerto Rico	0	0	1	1
Totals (3 entries)		1	1	1	3

=== Medalists ===
Event	Gold	Silver	Bronze
Men's	Cuba: Juan Manrique; Pedro Luis Rodríguez; Orestes Kindelán; Jorge Toca; Lourdes Gourriel; Antonio Pacheco; Juan Padilla; Eduardo Paret; Germán Mesa; Omar Linares; Luis Ulacia; Ermidelio Urrutia; Víctor Mesa; José Estrada; Daniel Lazo; Pedro Luis Lazo; Omar Ajete; Rolando Arrojo; Eliecer Montes de Oca; José Ibar; Osvaldo Fernández; Orlando Hernández	Nicaragua: Oswaldo Mairena; Yader Soto; Jose Quiroz; Luis Miranda; Pedro Ramirez; Eduardo Bojorge; Guillermo Modragon; Roberto Mendoza; Julio Osejo; Jairo Mendoza; Jorge Avellan; Julio Medina; Norman Cardoze; Nemesio Porras; Henry Roa; Ariel Delgado; Bayardo Davila; Richard Hunter; Sandy Moreno; Anibal Vega; Jose Ramon Padilla; Carlos Berrios	Puerto Rico: Jose Fortis; Nelson Sanchez; David Melendez; Ramon Montanez; José Mateo; Orville Batista; Luis Victoria; Wilfredo Velez; Jose Lorenzano; Efrain Nieves Sr.; Efrain Garcia; Jose Miranda; Carlos Márquez; Jaime Roque; Juan Montero; Luis Ramos; Abimael Rosario; Alberto Bracero; Angel A. Morales; Jorge Aranzamendi; Joel Perez; Omar Hernandez
