= Eric Fox =

American baseball coach (born 1963)

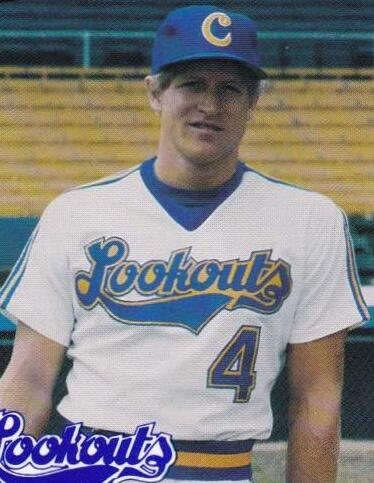
- Fox with the Chattanooga Lookouts c. 1987
- Outfielder
- Born: August 15, 1963 (age 62); Lemoore, California, U.S.
- Batted: Both Threw: Left

MLB debut
- July 7, 1992, for the Oakland Athletics

Last MLB appearance
- July 5, 1995, for the Texas Rangers

MLB statistics
- Batting average: .198
- Home runs: 5
- Runs batted in: 19
- Stats at Baseball Reference

Teams
- Oakland Athletics (1992–1994); Texas Rangers (1995)
Medals
Baseball
Representing the United States
Pan American Games
Bronze medal – third place	1983 Caracas	Team

Eric Hollis Fox (born August 15, 1963) is an American professional baseball coach. The 5 ft 10 in (1.78 m), 180 lb (82 kg) former Major League Baseball outfielder attended Fresno State University.

== Career ==
A switch hitter who threw left-handed, Fox was taken in the 22nd round (566th overall) of the 1984 Major League Baseball draft by the Toronto Blue Jays. He failed to sign and re-entered the draft. In 1985, the Philadelphia Phillies took him in the 13th round, 330th overall; again, he did not sign. Finally, in the 1986 draft, the Seattle Mariners took him fifth overall in the first round, and he signed with them.

Fox spent three seasons in the Mariners organization before being released on March 29, 1989. On that same day, the Oakland Athletics quickly signed him. He spent the next few years in the Athletics' minor league system before making his Major League debut on July 7, 1992, at the age of 28.

Fox's career highlight may have come on July 29, 1992, when Fox hit a game-winning, three-run home run against the Minnesota Twins. That win put the A's into a first place tie with the Twins and catapulted them towards the American League West Division title that season, while the Twins finished in second place, six games back of the A's. Many Twins fans blame that game and his home run for the downfall of the franchise through the rest of the 1990s, only one year removed from winning the World Series in 1991.

His first major-league opening night was with the A's on April 5, 1993. In that game, he hit a grand slam on a full count.

The minor league speedster did not live up to his 49-steal potential in the Majors. In 116 career MLB games, he stole only five bases (in 1,178 minor league games, he stole 224 bases).

His final big-league game was July 5, 1995, with the Texas Rangers. Throughout his big league career, he had a .198 batting average.

After his final big league game, he still played minor league baseball until 1997, in the Los Angeles Dodgers, Phillies and Baltimore Orioles organizations. He has since coached in several organizations, notably the Florida Marlins and Arizona Diamondbacks systems, and spent 2013 as a coach for the Harrisburg Senators in the Washington Nationals' farm system. He was the manager of the Marlins' Double-A affiliate, the Portland Sea Dogs, in 2002.
