= Jonathan Loáisiga =

Nicaraguan baseball player (born 1994)

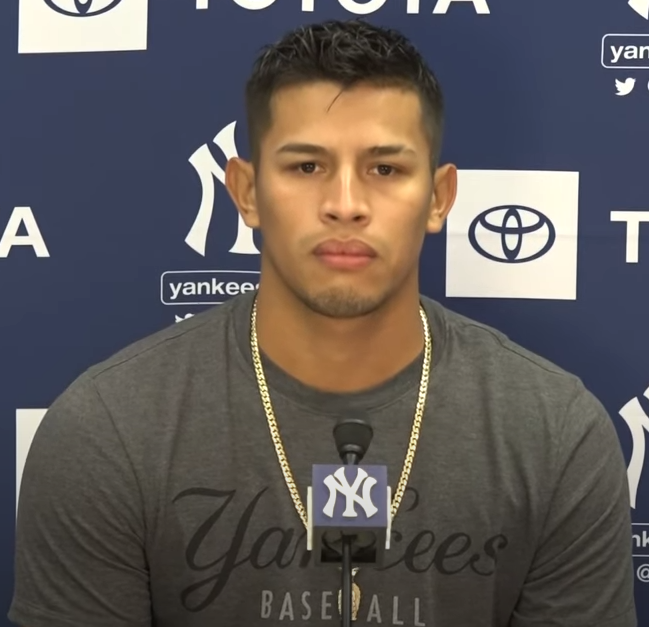
- Loáisiga with the Yankees in 2021

Free agent
- Pitcher
- Born: November 2, 1994 (age 32); Managua, Nicaragua
- Bats: Right Throws: Right

MLB debut
- June 15, 2018, for the New York Yankees

MLB statistics (through 2026 season)
- Win–loss record: 26–15
- Earned run average: 3.30
- Strikeouts: 280
- Stats at Baseball Reference

Teams
- New York Yankees (2018–2025); Arizona Diamondbacks (2026)

Jonathan Stanley Loáisiga Estrada (/loʊˈaɪsiɡə/ loh-EYE-see-gə, born November 2, 1994) is a Nicaraguan professional baseball pitcher who is a free agent. He has played in Major League Baseball (MLB) for the New York Yankees and Arizona Diamondbacks. He made his MLB debut in 2018.

== Professional career ==
=== San Francisco Giants ===
Loáisiga signed with the San Francisco Giants as an international free agent on September 23, 2012. He made his professional debut in 2013 with the Dominican Summer League Giants and spent the whole season there, posting an 8–1 win–loss record with a 2.75 earned run average (ERA) and 1.11 WHIP in 13 games started. He did not pitch in 2014 and 2015 due to injuries, and the Giants released him on May 30, 2015.

=== New York Yankees ===
Loáisiga signed with the New York Yankees on February 9, 2016. He began the season with the Charleston RiverDogs, and after pitching one game, he suffered an injury which required Tommy John surgery. The Yankees added him to their 40-man roster after the season. He returned in 2017 and pitched for both the Gulf Coast League Yankees and Staten Island Yankees, pitching to a combined 1–1 record and 1.38 ERA in 11 starts.

Loáisiga began the 2018 season with the Tampa Yankees of the Low-A Florida State League, and earned a promotion to the Trenton Thunder of the Double-A Eastern League after starting the season with 3–0 record with 1.35 ERA over four starts. In Trenton, he made six starts, compiling a 4.32 ERA, however impressed by striking out 32 batters in 25 innings of work. After Yankees starter Masahiro Tanaka was injured, Loáisiga was called up to the majors, skipping the Triple-A level. He made his major league debut on June 15, 2018, during which he pitched five scoreless innings, and earned the win. He was also the first Nicaraguan to play for the Yankees. He made four starts for the Yankees, pitching to a 3.00 ERA, and was optioned to the Scranton/Wilkes-Barre RailRiders of the Triple-A International League on July 2. He was recalled to the Yankees on September 2 after roster expansion. In total he pitched 24 2/3 innings for the Yankees in 2018. He followed it up in 2019 with 31 2/3 innings across 15 appearances for the Yankees.

In 2020, Loáisiga broke camp with the Yankees, again serving as a swing man, starting occasionally and also coming out of the bullpen.

On April 24, 2021, Loáisiga recorded his first career save against the Cleveland Indians. Two months later on June 25, Loáisiga became the first relief pitcher in Yankees history to strike out four batters in one inning, striking out Michael Chavis, Alex Verdugo, J. D. Martinez, and Xander Bogaerts of the Boston Red Sox in the seventh inning.

In July 2021, Loáisiga, along with teammates Nestor Cortes, and Wandy Peralta tested positive for COVID-19, causing the Yankees to put him on the COVID-19 injured list and the MLB to postpone the game against the Boston Red Sox to the start of the second half of the season. Loáisiga finished the 2021 season with 18 holds, a 2.17 ERA and 69 strikeouts in 70 2/3 innings. In 2022 he was 2-3 with a 4.13 ERA.

On May 1, 2023, it was announced that Loáisiga would be out until August after undergoing surgery to remove a bone spur from his right elbow. On August 7, Loáisiga was activated from the injured list. In 17 relief outings, he logged a 3.06 ERA with 6 strikeouts across 17 2/3 innings pitched.

Loáisiga made three scoreless appearances for the Yankees to begin the 2024 season. However, he was placed on the 60–day injured list with a right flexor strain on April 5, 2024. The next day, it was revealed that Loáisiga had a torn UCL in the right elbow, requiring surgery, and prematurely ending his 2024 season.

On December 11, 2024, Loáisiga signed a one-year contract to return to the Yankees with a club option for 2026. In 30 appearances for New York, he registered an 0-1 record and 4.25 ERA with 25 strikeouts and one save across 29 2/3 innings pitched. On August 28, 2025, it was announced that Loáisiga would miss the remainder of the season due to a flexor strain. The Yankees declined his club option on November 5, making him a free agent.

=== Arizona Diamondbacks ===
On January 13, 2026, Loáisiga signed a minor league contract with the Arizona Diamondbacks. On March 25, the Diamondbacks selected Loáisiga's contract after he made the team's Opening Day roster.

== International career ==
Loáisiga played for the Nicaraguan national baseball team in the 2017 World Baseball Classic qualifiers. He pitched 2.1 innings over two games, allowing two unearned runs, and earning the win over the Czech Republic national baseball team in extra innings. However, Nicaragua lost to Mexico in the finals.

He was also selected to the Nicaraguan squad for the 2023 World Baseball Classic after they advanced from the qualifying round. In two innings pitched over two appearances, Loáisiga earned a 13.50 ERA, including a blown save against Israel after he allowed three hits to score three earned runs in the eighth inning. Despite his performance, Loáisiga called the WBC a “really good experience,” adding that, "when you’re given this opportunity to represent your country and have the chance to participate in an event like this, I think any of us will take that. It’s a unique opportunity... To be able to wear the uniform of your country, it means a lot.”

== Personal life ==
His father Stanley Loáisiga played in the Montreal Expos minor league system and his grandfather was an accomplished professional pitcher in Nicaragua. His brother Mike signed with the Los Angeles Dodgers at 17 and played in the team's minor leagues until 2018. Growing up, Jonathan idolized Dennis Martínez, a fellow Nicaraguan who won 245 games in the major leagues.

== See also ==
- List of Major League Baseball players from Nicaragua
