= Baseball at the Pan American Games =

- No. of events: 2 (men: 1; women: 1)

The baseball tournament at the Pan American Games has long been considered to be one of the premier international baseball events in the world, even higher than the Olympic Games. This is because the level of competition is higher than in the Olympics, where only two teams from the Americas traditionally were permitted to qualify. Cuba has dominated the tournament since its inception. Cubans field their strongest players, while the Americans sent college players, as the schedule does not allow MLB players to participate. In 2013, a women's tournament was added to the program, effective with the 2015 Games. A total of seven men and five women's teams competed in each tournament respectively. In 2019, the women's tournament was not held, while the men's tournament was increased to 8 teams.

== Men's tournament ==
Year	Host	Gold	Silver	Bronze	Fourth place
1951; Details	(Argentina); Buenos Aires	Cuba	United States	Mexico	Nicaragua
1955; Details	Mexico City	Dominican Republic	United States	Venezuela	Mexico
1959; Details	(United States); Chicago	Venezuela	Puerto Rico	United States	Cuba
1963; Details	(Brazil); São Paulo	Cuba	United States	Mexico	Venezuela
1967; Details	(Canada); Winnipeg	United States	Cuba	Puerto Rico	Mexico
1971; Details	(Colombia); Cali	Cuba	United States	Colombia	Canada
1975; Details	Mexico City	Cuba	United States	Venezuela	Mexico
1979; Details	(Puerto Rico); San Juan	Cuba	Dominican Republic	Puerto Rico	United States
1983; Details	(Venezuela); Caracas	Cuba	Nicaragua	United States	Dominican Republic
1987; Details	(United States); Indianapolis	Cuba	United States	Puerto Rico	Canada
1991; Details	(Cuba); Havana	Cuba	Puerto Rico	United States	Dominican Republic
1995; Details	(Argentina); Mar del Plata	Cuba	Nicaragua	Puerto Rico	Mexico
1999; Details	(Canada); Winnipeg	Cuba	United States	Canada	Mexico
2003; Details	(Dominican Republic); Santo Domingo	Cuba	United States	Mexico	Nicaragua
2007; Details	(Brazil); Rio de Janeiro	Cuba	United States	Mexico Nicaragua	None
2011; Details	(Mexico); Guadalajara	Canada	United States	Cuba	Mexico
2015; Details	(Canada); Toronto	Canada	United States	Cuba	Puerto Rico
2019; Details	(Peru); Lima	Puerto Rico	Canada	Nicaragua	Colombia
2023; Details	(Chile); Santiago	Colombia	Brazil	Mexico	Panama
2027; Details	(Peru); Lima				
2031; Details	(Paraguay); Asunción				

== Women's tournament ==
Year	Host	Gold	Silver	Bronze	Fourth place
2015; Details	(Canada); Toronto	United States	Canada	Venezuela	Puerto Rico

== Medal table ==
Rank	Nation	Gold	Silver	Bronze	Total
1	Cuba	12	1	2	15
2	United States	2	11	3	16
3	Canada	2	2	1	5
4	Puerto Rico	1	2	4	7
5	Dominican Republic	1	1	0	2
6	Venezuela	1	0	3	4
7	Colombia	1	0	1	2
8	Nicaragua	0	2	2	4
9	Brazil	0	1	0	1
10	Mexico	0	0	5	5
Totals (10 entries)		20	20	21	61

== Men's participating nations ==
Nation	1951	1955	1959	1963	1967	1971	1975	1979	1983	1987	1991	1995	1999	2003	2007	2011	2015	2019	2023	Years
Argentina	8											6						7		3
Aruba										6	7									2
Bahamas								5						9						2
Brazil	7		9	5					11			8	9	5	7				2nd place, silver medalist(s)	9
Canada					5	4	7	8	6	4	8		3rd place, bronze medalist(s)			1st place, gold medalist(s)	1st place, gold medalist(s)	2nd place, silver medalist(s)		11
Chile																			8	1
Colombia	6					3rd place, bronze medalist(s)	6	7	8								7	4	1st place, gold medalist(s)	8
Costa Rica			6																	1
Cuba	1st place, gold medalist(s)		4	1st place, gold medalist(s)	2nd place, silver medalist(s)	1st place, gold medalist(s)	1st place, gold medalist(s)	1st place, gold medalist(s)	1st place, gold medalist(s)	1st place, gold medalist(s)	1st place, gold medalist(s)	1st place, gold medalist(s)	1st place, gold medalist(s)	1st place, gold medalist(s)	1st place, gold medalist(s)	3rd place, bronze medalist(s)	3rd place, bronze medalist(s)	6	6	18
Dominican Republic		1st place, gold medalist(s)	8			7	5	2nd place, silver medalist(s)	4		4		6	7	5	5	5	5	5	14
El Salvador							9													1
Guatemala												7	8	8						3
Mexico	3rd place, bronze medalist(s)	4	5	3rd place, bronze medalist(s)	4	9	4	9			6	4	4	3rd place, bronze medalist(s)	3rd place, bronze medalist(s)	4			3rd place, bronze medalist(s)	15
Netherlands Antilles		5							10	8	9	10								5
Nicaragua	4		7			8			2nd place, silver medalist(s)	5	5	2nd place, silver medalist(s)	5	4	3rd place, bronze medalist(s)		6	3rd place, bronze medalist(s)		12
Panama									7			5	7	6	6	8			4	7
Peru																		8		1
Puerto Rico			2nd place, silver medalist(s)		3rd place, bronze medalist(s)	5	8	3rd place, bronze medalist(s)	9	3rd place, bronze medalist(s)	2nd place, silver medalist(s)	3rd place, bronze medalist(s)				7	4	1st place, gold medalist(s)		12
United States	2nd place, silver medalist(s)	2nd place, silver medalist(s)	3rd place, bronze medalist(s)	2nd place, silver medalist(s)	1st place, gold medalist(s)	2nd place, silver medalist(s)	2nd place, silver medalist(s)	4	3rd place, bronze medalist(s)	2nd place, silver medalist(s)	3rd place, bronze medalist(s)	9	2nd place, silver medalist(s)	2nd place, silver medalist(s)	2nd place, silver medalist(s)	2nd place, silver medalist(s)	2nd place, silver medalist(s)			17
Venezuela	5	3rd place, bronze medalist(s)	1st place, gold medalist(s)	4		6	3rd place, bronze medalist(s)	6	5	7					8	6			7	12
Nations	8	5	9	5	5	9	9	9	11	8	9	10	9	9	8	8	7	8	8	

== Women's participating nations ==
Nation	2015	Years
Canada	2nd place, silver medalist(s)	1
Cuba	5	1
Puerto Rico	4	1
United States	1st place, gold medalist(s)	1
Venezuela	3rd place, bronze medalist(s)	1
Nations	5	
