= Baseball at the 1979 Pan American Games =

- Venue: Puerto Rico
- Dates: July 2–12, 1979
- Competitors: 180 from 9 nations

Medalists
Gold medal	Cuba
Silver medal	Dominican Republic
Bronze medal	Puerto Rico

Baseball competitions at the 1979 Pan American Games in San Juan, Puerto Rico, were held on July 2–12. The venues for the competition were the Juan Ramón Loubriel Stadium, the Guaynabo Municipal Stadium and the Parque Yldefonso Solá Morales.

Cuba entered the competition as the two-time defending champions, having won the gold medal in 1971 and 1975. They successfully defended their title, with the Dominican Republic finishing second.

== Medalists ==
Event	Gold	Silver	Bronze
Men's tournament	Cuba: Rey Vicente Anglada; Armando Capiró; Luis Casanova; Rafael Castillo; Rogelio García; Jesús Guerra; Fernando Hernández; Pedro Jova; Agustín Marquetti; Alberto Martínez; Pedro Medina; Antonio Muñoz; Juan Carlos Oliva; Rodolfo Puente; Pedro José Rodríguez Sr.; Fernando Sánchez; Wilfredo Sánchez; Lázaro Santana; Alfonso Urquiola; Braudilio Vinent	Dominican Republic: Marcos Aguasvivas; Rafael Almonte; Rafael Belliard; Maney Cabreja; Pablo Cabrera; Iván Crispín; Quique Cruz; Orlando De León; Cecilio Guante; Orlando Guerrero; Rafael Harris; Jony Olivo; Juan Ortiz; Héctor Paniagua; Aquiles Peña; Manuel Peña; Felipe Polanco; Antonio Romero; Rafael Stephan	Puerto Rico: Carmelo Aguayo; Héctor Ayala; Angel Báez; Julio Bonilla; Luis Colón; Milton Crespo; Alejandro De Jesús; Jesús Feliciano; Víctor Gómez; Edwin Hernández; Ramón Lara; Carlos Lugo; Juan Martínez; Luis Mercado; Rogelio Negrón; Carlos Ponce; Mariano Quiñones; David Rodríguez; Angel Rodríguez; Obdulio Valentín

== Results ==
The tournament consisted of a single round-robin group where all nine teams played each other once. Medals were awarded to the top three teams in the group at the end of the tournament.

Pos	Team	Pld	W	L	RF	RA	RD	PCT
1	Cuba	8	8	0	76	26	+50	1.000
2	Dominican Republic	8	7	1	34	17	+17	.875
3	Puerto Rico	8	6	2	47	34	+13	.750
4	United States	8	5	3	55	21	+34	.625
5	Bahamas	8	3	5	29	49	−20	.375
6	Venezuela	8	3	5	40	39	+1	.375
7	Colombia	8	2	6	28	49	−21	.250
8	Canada	8	1	7	27	56	−29	.125
9	Mexico	8	1	7	23	69	−46	.125

Updated to match(es) played on unknown. Source:
