= List of Major League Baseball players from Nicaragua =

This is an alphabetical list of 18 baseball players from Nicaragua who appeared in Major League Baseball between 1976 and 2019.

== Players ==
Name	Debut	Final Game	Position	Teams	Ref
Dennis Martínez	September 14, 1976	September 27, 1998	Pitcher	Baltimore Orioles, Montreal Expos, Cleveland Indians, Seattle Mariners, Atlanta Braves	
Tony Chévez	May 31, 1977	June 8, 1977	Pitcher	Baltimore Orioles	
Albert Williams	May 7, 1980	September 26, 1984	Pitcher	Minnesota Twins	
David Green	September 4, 1981	October 4, 1987	First baseman/Outfielder	St. Louis Cardinals, San Francisco Giants	
Porfi Altamirano	May 9, 1982	June 8, 1984	Pitcher	Philadelphia Phillies, Chicago Cubs	
Marvin Benard	September 5, 1995	September 27, 2003	Outfielder	San Francisco Giants	
Vicente Padilla	June 29, 1999	October 2, 2012	Pitcher	Arizona Diamondbacks, Philadelphia Phillies, Texas Rangers, Los Angeles Dodgers, Boston Red Sox	
Oswaldo Mairena	September 5, 2000	September 28, 2002	Pitcher	Chicago Cubs, Florida Marlins	
Devern Hansack	September 23, 2006	September 28, 2008	Pitcher	Boston Red Sox	
Everth Cabrera	April 8, 2009	June 4, 2015	Shortstop	San Diego Padres, Baltimore Orioles	
Wilton López	August 28, 2009	April 8, 2014	Pitcher	Houston Astros, Colorado Rockies	
Erasmo Ramírez	April 9, 2012		Pitcher	Seattle Mariners, Tampa Bay Rays	
J. C. Ramírez	June 20, 2013		Pitcher	Philadelphia Phillies, Arizona Diamondbacks, Seattle Mariners, Cincinnati Reds, Los Angeles Angels	
Cheslor Cuthbert	July 7, 2015		Third baseman / Second baseman	Kansas City Royals	
Jonathan Loáisiga	June 15, 2018		Pitcher	New York Yankees	
Carlos Rodríguez	June 11, 2024		Pitcher	Milwaukee Brewers	
