= Cheo Ramos =

Cuban professional baseball player (born 1901)

- Outfielder
- Born: March 24, 1901; Güines, Cuba
- Died: Unknown; Unknown
- Batted: Right Threw: Right

Negro league baseball debut
- 1929, for the Cuban Stars (East)

Last appearance
- 1929, for the Cuban Stars (East)

Teams
- Cuban Stars (East) (1929)

José "Cheo" Ramos (March 24, 1901 – death date unknown) was a Cuban professional baseball outfielder who played in the Negro leagues, Cuban League and minor league baseball in the 1910s and 1920s.

Ramos made his professional debut in 1918 with Habana of the Cuban League. In 1921, he played Negro league baseball with the All Cubans, but spent the majority of the 1920s in the Cuban League with Habana and Almendares. Ramos returned to the Negro leagues in 1929, finishing his playing career with the Cuban Stars (East). He remained in the game as a manager through the 1950s, skippering the Nicaragua national baseball team in 1954.
