= Baseball at the 1975 Pan American Games =

- Venue: Mexico City, Mexico
- Competitors: 9 teams

Medalists
Gold medal	Cuba
Silver medal	United States
Bronze medal	Venezuela

Baseball at the 1975 Pan American Games was contested between teams representing Canada, Colombia, Cuba, Dominican Republic, El Salvador, Mexico, Puerto Rico, United States, and Venezuela. The 1975 edition was the seventh Pan American Games, and was hosted by Mexico City.

Cuba entered the competition as the defending champions, having won the gold medal in 1971. They successfully defended their title, with the United States finishing second.

== Medal summary ==
=== Medal table ===
Rank	Nation	Gold	Silver	Bronze	Total
1	Cuba	1	0	0	1
2	United States	0	1	0	1
3	Venezuela	0	0	1	1
Totals (3 entries)		1	1	1	3

=== Medalists ===
Event	Gold	Silver	Bronze
Men's	Cuba: Julio Romero; Oscar Romero; Omar Carrero; Juan Pérez; Braudilio Vinent; Santiago Mederos; Lázaro Pérez; Evelio Hernández; Agustín Marquetti; Alfonso Urquiola; Félix Isasi; Osvaldo Oliva; Pedro José Rodríguez Sr.; Rodolfo Puente; Agustín Arias; Armando Capiró; Fermín Laffita; Fernando Sánchez; Antonio Muñoz; Wilfredo Sánchez	United States: Gary Allenson; Ed Bahns; Jeff Carsley; Rick Clopton; Mark Daly; Duane Gustavson; Don Hanna; Ron Hassey; Steve Kemp; Wayne Krenchicki; Bob Owchinko; Steve Powers; Pete Redfern; Scott Sanderson; Mike Scott; Dave Stegman; Eddie Stephenson; Paul Stevens; Joe Strain; Rich Wortham	Venezuela: Jesús Hernández; Evelio Ovalles; José Granados; Omar Marín; Arsenis Navas; Guillermo Guerra; William Hidalgo; José Luis Ayala; Ignacio Camero; Ornar Guzmán; Gustavo Rivas; Pedro Ávila; Ubaldo Alcedo; José Juárez; Luis González; Jesús Hernández; Miguel González; Luis Bravo; Victor Williams; Gustavo Bastardo
