= 1952 Amateur World Series =

Tournament details
- Country: Cuba
- Teams: 13

Final positions
- Champions: Cuba
- Runners-up: Dominican Republic
- Third place: Puerto Rico
- Fourth place: Panama

The 1952 Amateur World Series was the 13th Amateur World Series. It was held in Havana from September 6 through September 26. Starting this year and continuing until 2007, Cuba would win every Amateur World Series/Baseball World Cup it entered - a run of 20 titles.

== Final standings ==
Rk	Team	Record
1	Cuba	9–2
2	Dominican Republic	7–3
3	Puerto Rico	7–3
4	Panama	6–3
5	Nicaragua	6–5
6	Venezuela	5–5
7	Mexico	3–3
8	Colombia	2–3
9	Netherlands Antilles	2–4
10	El Salvador	2–4
11	Costa Rica	1–4
12	Guatemala	0–5
13	Honduras	0–6
