= Oswaldo Mairena =

Nicaraguan baseball player (born 1975)

- Relief pitcher
- Born: July 30, 1975 (age 50); Chinandega, Nicaragua
- Batted: Left Threw: Left

MLB debut
- September 5, 2000, for the Chicago Cubs

Last MLB appearance
- September 28, 2002, for the Florida Marlins

MLB statistics
- Win–loss record: 2–3
- Earned run average: 6.06
- Strikeouts: 21
- Stats at Baseball Reference

Teams
- Chicago Cubs (2000); Florida Marlins (2002)
Medals
Men's baseball
Representing Nicaragua
Pan American Games
Silver medal – second place	1995 Mar del Plata	Team
Bronze medal – third place	2007 Rio de Janeiro	Team

Oswaldo Antonio Mairena (born July 30, 1975) is a Nicaraguan former professional baseball relief pitcher. He played in Major League Baseball for the Chicago Cubs and Florida Marlins.

== Biography ==
Mairena represented Nicaragua at the 1995 Pan American Games and the 1996 Summer Olympics. Immediately after his performance in the Olympics, he was signed by the New York Yankees as an amateur free agent. He began pitching in the Yankees organization in 1997 with the Greensboro Bats. He was promoted in 1998 to the Tampa Yankees, and promoted again to the Norwich Navigators in 1999, where he finished the season with a 4–3 win–loss record and a 2.67 earned run average (ERA) in 43 games. He spent the first half of 2000 with Norwich until July 21, when he was traded with Ben Ford to the Chicago Cubs for Glenallen Hill. After spending August in the minor leagues, Mairena was promoted to the Cubs' major league roster. He made his debut on September 5, and finished the season with an 18.00 ERA in two games.

In 2001, Mairena was traded during spring training to the Florida Marlins for Manny Aybar, and split the season between the Calgary Cannons and Portland Sea Dogs. In 2002, he spent the first half of the season with Calgary until his promotion to the major league roster. He pitched in 31 games for the Marlins and had a 2–3 record and an ERA of 5.35. He spent all of 2003 with the Triple-A Albuquerque Isotopes, pitching in 61 games for the team. Mairena was released from the team after 2003, and spent 2004 with the Uni-President Lions of the Chinese Professional Baseball League. He spent 2005 in the Mexican League, splitting the season between the Guerreros de Oaxaca and Vaqueros Laguna, and ended his professional career representing Nicaragua at the 2005 Baseball World Cup and the 2007 Pan American Games.
