= Time in El Salvador =

- Time zone: Central Standard Time
- Initials: CST
- UTC offset: UTC−6

Daylight saving time
- DST not observed

tz database
- America/El_Salvador

El Salvador observes Central Standard Time (UTC−6) year-round.

== IANA time zone database ==
In the IANA time zone database, El Salvador is given one zone in the file zone.tab—America/El_Salvador. "SV" refers to the country's ISO 3166-1 alpha-2 country code. Data for El Salvador directly from zone.tab of the IANA time zone database; columns marked with * are the columns from zone.tab itself:

c.c.*	coordinates*	TZ*	Comments	UTC offset	DST
SV	+1342−08912	America/El_Salvador		−06:00	−06:00
