= 1971 Amateur World Series =

Tournament details
- Country: Cuba
- Teams: 10
- Defending champions: Cuba

Final positions
- Champions: Cuba (11th title)
- Runners-up: Colombia
- Third place: Nicaragua
- Fourth place: Puerto Rico

The 1971 Amateur World Series was the 19th Amateur World Series (AWS), an international men's amateur baseball tournament. The tournament was sanctioned by the International Baseball Federation (which titled it the Baseball World Cup as of the 1988 tournament). The tournament took place, for the seventh time, in Cuba, and was won by the host Cuba national baseball team, their 11th title. They finished with an undefeated record of 9–0, recording six shutouts and scoring 60 runs while allowing only four.

== Participants ==
There were 10 participating countries. The United States, which had returned to the international baseball scene just two years prior after a 27-year-absence, declined to take part in the tournament. The U.S. delegation to the 1970 FIBA Congress reportedly pledged that they would boycott the competition due to political differences with the regime of Fidel Castro. This decision was confirmed by United States Baseball Federation in June 1971, though USBF president Dutch Fehring claimed it was due to financial reasons.

Colombia notably protested that the Mexican team illegally used three professional players. Mexico were later stripped of several victories, dropping them to ninth place in the standings.

== Final standings ==
Pos	Team	W	L
1st place, gold medalist(s)	Cuba	9	0
2nd place, silver medalist(s)	Colombia	7	2
3rd place, bronze medalist(s)	Nicaragua	6	3
4	Puerto Rico	6	3
5	Panama	5	4
6	Canada	4	5
7	Dominican Republic	4	4
8	Italy	2	7
9	Mexico	2	7
10	Netherlands Antilles	0	9

== Honors and awards ==
=== Statistical leaders ===
Batting leaders
Statistic	Name	Total
Batting average	(Cuba) Rodolfo Puente	.429
Hits	(Panama) Ruperto Cooper	14
Runs	(Cuba) Elpidio Mancebo	12
Home runs	(Colombia) Luis Escobar (Canada) Rick Cruise	7
Runs batted in	(Panama) Ruperto Cooper	11
Stolen bases	(Colombia) Orlando Ramírez	7

Pitching leaders
Statistic	Name	Total
Wins	(Puerto Rico) Carlos Lowell	3
Earned run average	(Cuba) Santiago Mederos	0.00
Strikeouts	(Puerto Rico) Carlos Lowell	32

=== All-Star team ===
Position	Player
C	(Cuba) Lázaro Pérez
1B	(Cuba) Elpidio Mancebo
2B	(Nicaragua) Rafael Obando
3B	(Colombia) Abel Leal
SS	(Cuba) Rodolfo Puente
OF	(Colombia) Luis Escobar
OF	(Puerto Rico) Luis Mercado
OF	(Cuba) Wilfredo Sanchez
P	(Puerto Rico) Carlos Lowell (LHP)
P	(Cuba) Santiago Mederos (RHP)
