= 1972 Amateur World Series =

Tournament details
- Country: Nicaragua
- Venue(s): Estadio General Anastasio Somoza (in Managua host cities)
- Teams: 16
- Defending champions: Cuba

Final positions
- Champions: Cuba (12th title)
- Runners-up: United States
- Third place: Nicaragua
- Fourth place: Japan

The 1972 Amateur World Series was the 20th Amateur World Series (AWS), an international men's amateur baseball tournament. The tournament was sanctioned by the International Baseball Federation (FIBA) and took place, for the third time, in Nicaragua, from November 25th to December 5, 1972.

Cuba won its 12th international championship, and fourth consecutive title; the United States finished with the silver medal for the third time since returning to AWS competition in 1969. Nicaragua, the hosts, finished with the bronze for the second consecutive year.

The tournament occurred just weeks before the devastating 1972 Nicaragua earthquake. This led to a controversy where Nicaragua was suspended from FIBA on charges that it had been too late in paying FIBA the tournament revenues, despite the earthquake. The suspension of Nicaragua in light of these events was a catalyst for Nicaragua, the United States, and several other baseball federations to leave FIBA and form their own international baseball organization, FEMBA.

== Participants ==
16 nations participated, the most ever included in an Amateur World Series to date (the previous high had been 13, in 1952). Both Japan and Chinese Taipei made their debuts, becoming the first Asian countries to participate in the tournament. Brazil also made it Amateur World Series debut, though after 1972, it would not return to the tournament until 2003 (when it was known as the Baseball World Cup).

The Puerto Rico national baseball team was notably managed by Roberto Clemente, a legendary major leaguer with the Pittsburgh Pirates. Three weeks after the tournament, Clemente was attempting to return to Managua when his flight, carrying foreign aid for earthquake victims, crashed, killing Clemente and four others.

== Final standings ==
Pos	Team	W	L
1st place, gold medalist(s)	Cuba	14	1
2nd place, silver medalist(s)	United States	13	2
3rd place, bronze medalist(s)	Nicaragua	13	2
4	Japan	11	4
5	Panama	10	5
6	Puerto Rico	9	6
7	Dominican Republic	9	6
8	Chinese Taipei	8	7
9	Canada	5	10
10	Guatemala	4	11
11	Honduras	4	11
12	Brazil	4	11
13	Costa Rica	4	11
14	El Salvador	4	11
15	Italy	3	12
16	West Germany	0	15
