= 2026 World Baseball Classic qualification =

World Baseball Classic 2025 Qualifiers
Tournament details
- Countries: Taiwan; United States
- Dates: February 21 – March 6, 2025
- Teams: 8 (from 4 confederations)

The qualifying round of the 2026 World Baseball Classic, officially called the World Baseball Classic 2025 Qualifiers, was held from February 21 to March 6, 2025. The top four teams in each pool of the 2023 World Baseball Classic automatically qualified for the 2026 tournament. The qualifiers consisted of two tournaments with four teams each, and was held in Taipei, Taiwan, and Tucson, United States of America. Two teams of each tournament qualified for the 2026 World Baseball Classic.

== Qualified teams ==
Qualification status: Qualified for the 2026 World Baseball Classic Participated in the qualifier but failed to qualify

Note: World ranking indicates positions in the latest WBSC World Rankings (December 31, 2024) at the time of the announcement of the qualifiers.

Team	World ranking	Method of qualification	Classic appearance	Previous best position
Australia	12th	2023 World Baseball Classic pool stage top four	6th	Quarterfinals (2023)
Canada	22nd	2023 World Baseball Classic pool stage top four	6th	Pool stage
Cuba	10th	2023 World Baseball Classic pool stage top four	6th	Runners-up (2006)
Czech Republic	15th	2023 World Baseball Classic pool stage top four	2nd	Pool stage
Dominican Republic	11th	2023 World Baseball Classic pool stage top four	6th	Champions (2013)
Great Britain	18th	2023 World Baseball Classic pool stage top four	2nd	Pool stage
Israel	19th	2023 World Baseball Classic pool stage top four	3rd	Quarterfinals (2017)
Italy	14th	2023 World Baseball Classic pool stage top four	6th	Quarterfinals (2013, 2023)
Japan	1st	2023 World Baseball Classic pool stage top four	6th	Champions (2006, 2009, 2023)
Mexico	4th	2023 World Baseball Classic pool stage top four	6th	Third place (2023)
Netherlands	7th	2023 World Baseball Classic pool stage top four	6th	Fourth place (2013, 2017)
Panama	8th	2023 World Baseball Classic pool stage top four	4th	Pool stage
Puerto Rico	9th	2023 World Baseball Classic pool stage top four	6th	Runners-up (2013, 2017)
South Korea	6th	2023 World Baseball Classic pool stage top four	6th	Runners-up (2009)
United States	5th	2023 World Baseball Classic pool stage top four	6th	Champions (2017)
Venezuela	3rd	2023 World Baseball Classic pool stage top four	6th	Fourth place (2009)
Nicaragua	16th	Pool A winner	2nd	Pool stage
Chinese Taipei	2nd	Pool A second-place playoff winner	6th	Quarterfinals (2013)
Colombia	13th	Pool B winner	3rd	Pool stage
Brazil	23rd	Pool B second-place playoff winner	2nd	Pool stage

== Venues ==
Qualifier 1	2026 World Baseball Classic qualification is located in Taiwan	2026 World Baseball Classic qualification is located in the United States	Qualifier 2
Taipei, Taiwan	2026 World Baseball Classic qualification is located in Taiwan	2026 World Baseball Classic qualification is located in the United States	(United States) Tucson, U.S.
Taipei Dome	2026 World Baseball Classic qualification is located in Taiwan	2026 World Baseball Classic qualification is located in the United States	Kino Veterans Memorial Stadium
Capacity: 40,000	2026 World Baseball Classic qualification is located in Taiwan	2026 World Baseball Classic qualification is located in the United States	Capacity: 11,000

== Pools composition ==
Note: Numbers in parentheses indicate positions in the latest WBSC World Rankings (December 31, 2024) at the time of the announcement of the qualifiers.

Pool A	Pool B
Chinese Taipei (2) (hosts)	Colombia (13)
Nicaragua (16)	Germany (17)
Spain (24)	China (20)
South Africa (31)	Brazil (23)

The format consisted of two rounds. The first round was a round-robin, with the teams playing each other once. After the six games from each group, the first-placed team qualified for the final tournament, while the second and third-placed teams play in a seventh game where the winner also qualified.

== Pool A ==
Pool A took place at the Taipei Dome in Taipei, Taiwan, from February 21–25, 2025.

Pos	Team	Pld	W	L	RF	RA	PCT	GB	Qualification
1	Nicaragua	3	3	0	10	2	1.000	—	Final tournament
2	Chinese Taipei (H)	4	2	2	20	22	.500 (Note: Chinese Taipei defeated Spain in the second-place playoff, 6–3.)	1.5	Final tournament
3	Spain	4	2	2	25	14	.500	1.5	
4	South Africa	3	0	3	3	20	.000	3	

Source: MLB
(H) Hosts

=== Opening round ===
Date	Local time	Road team	Score	Home team	Inn.	Venue	Game duration	Attendance	Boxscore
February 21, 2025	12:00	South Africa	1–2	Nicaragua	10	Taipei Dome	2:30	14,925	Boxscore
February 21, 2025	19:00	Spain	12–5	Chinese Taipei		Taipei Dome	3:13	35,325	Boxscore
February 22, 2025	12:00	Spain	1–2	Nicaragua	10	Taipei Dome	2:58	15,015	Boxscore
February 22, 2025	19:00	Chinese Taipei	9–1	South Africa		Taipei Dome	3:05	35,868	Boxscore
February 23, 2025	12:00	South Africa	1–9	Spain		Taipei Dome	2:20	15,385	Boxscore
February 23, 2025	19:00	Nicaragua	6–0	Chinese Taipei		Taipei Dome	3:01	35,565	Boxscore

=== Second-place playoff ===
Date	Local time	Road team	Score	Home team	Inn.	Venue	Game duration	Attendance	Boxscore
February 25, 2025	19:00	Chinese Taipei	6–3	Spain		Taipei Dome	2:58	35,768	Boxscore

== Pool B ==
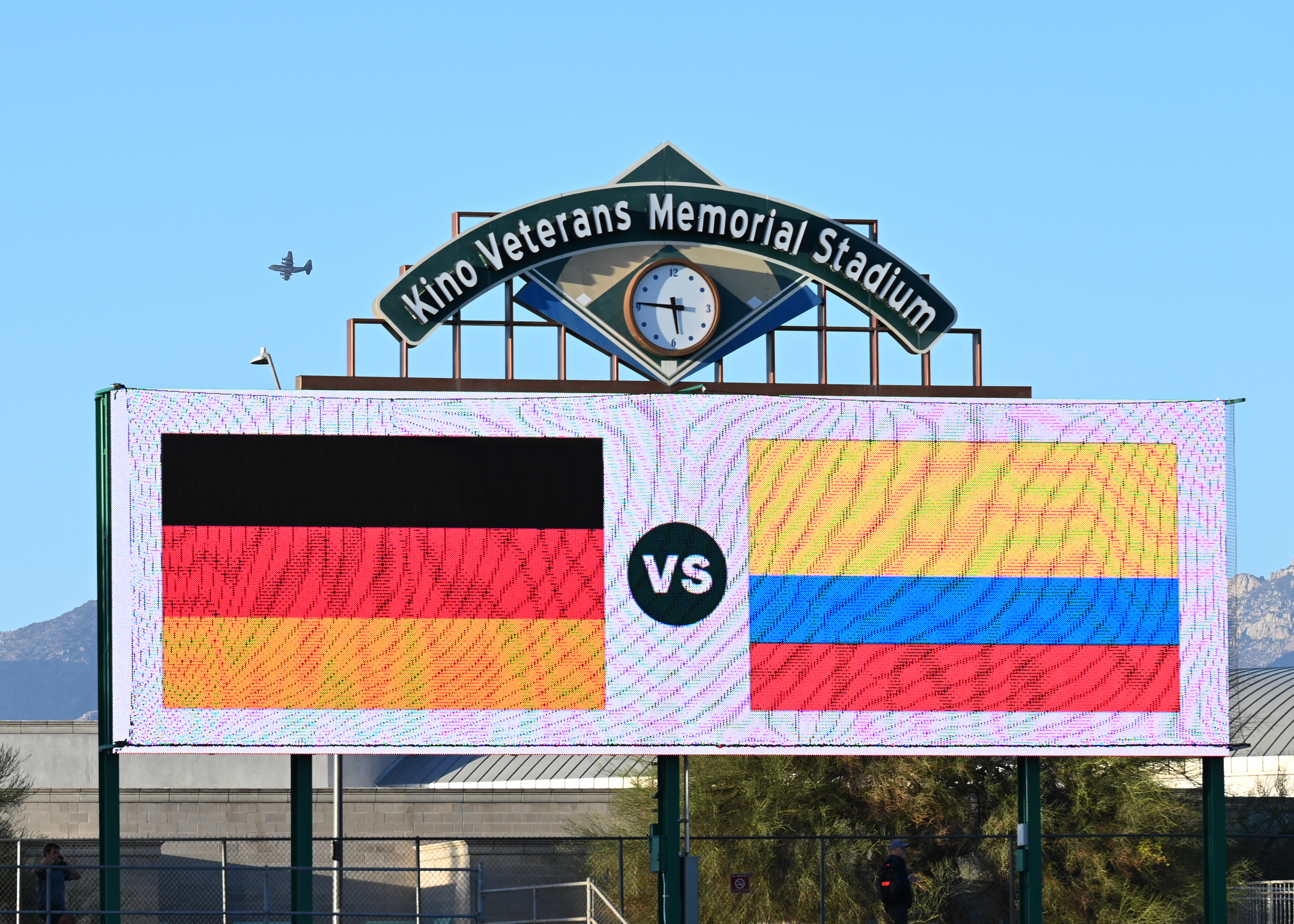
The videoboard at Kino Veterans Memorial Stadium before the game between Germany and Colombia

Pool B took place at the Kino Sports Complex's Veterans Memorial Stadium in Tucson, Arizona, United States, on March 2–6, 2025.

Pos	Team	Pld	W	L	RF	RA	PCT	GB	Qualification
1	Colombia	3	3	0	23	1	1.000	—	Final tournament
2	Brazil	4	3	1	27	18	.750 (Note: Brazil defeated Germany in the second-place playoff, 6–4.)	0.5	Final tournament
3	Germany	4	1	3	23	27	.250	2.5	
4	China	3	0	3	5	32	.000	3	

Source: MLB

=== Opening round ===
Date	Local time	Road team	Score	Home team	Inn.	Venue	Game duration	Attendance	Boxscore
March 2, 2025	11:00	China	2–12	Germany	7	Veterans Memorial Stadium	2:28	1,549	Boxscore
March 2, 2025	18:00	Brazil	0–5	Colombia		Veterans Memorial Stadium	2:23	2,332	Boxscore
March 3, 2025	11:00	Brazil	9–7	Germany		Veterans Memorial Stadium	3:05	2,193	Boxscore
March 3, 2025	18:00	Colombia	8–1	China		Veterans Memorial Stadium	2:39	1,259	Boxscore
March 4, 2025	11:00	China	2–12	Brazil	7	Veterans Memorial Stadium	2:30	3,566	Boxscore
March 4, 2025	18:00	Germany	0–10	Colombia	7	Veterans Memorial Stadium	2:07	2,137	Boxscore

=== Second-place playoff ===
Date	Local time	Road team	Score	Home team	Inn.	Venue	Game duration	Attendance	Boxscore
March 6, 2025	18:00	Germany	4–6	Brazil		Veterans Memorial Stadium	2:23	2,247	Boxscore

== Statistical leaders ==
Batting leaders
Statistic	Name	Total/Avg
Batting average*	(Colombia) Dilson Herrera	.583
Hits	(Chinese Taipei) Po-Hsuan Wang	8
Runs	(Brazil) Dante Bichette Jr.	5
Runs batted in	(Spain) Rusber Estrada	7
Runs batted in	(Colombia) Jesús Marriaga	7
On-base percentage*	(Chinese Taipei) Po-Hsuan Wang	.632
Slugging percentage*	(Colombia) Jesús Marriaga	1.000
OPS*	(Colombia) Jesús Marriaga	1.538

* Minimum 2.7 plate appearances per team game

Pitching leaders
Statistic	Name	Total/Avg
ERA*	(Colombia) Adrián Almedia (Spain) Yeudy García (Nicaragua) Jesús Garrido (Spain) Pablo Guillén (China) Dancaireng Hua (Nicaragua) Dilmer Mejía (Colombia) Julio Teherán (South Africa) Dylan Unsworth	0.00
Innings pitched	(Spain) Yeudy García	7.0
Strikeouts	(Spain) Ramón Rosso	9

* Minimum 0.8 innings pitched per team game

=== Awards ===
While no official awards were given, MLB.com named 10 standout players from the qualifiers.

Name	Position	Notes
(Brazil) Leonardo Reginatto	3B	5-for-13 with three doubles and four RBIs
(Nicaragua) Brandon Leytón	IF	6-for-13 with two doubles, a homer, and two RBIs.
(Colombia) Jesús Marriaga	OF	.500/.538/1.000 line with a home run, double, triple, and seven RBIs
(Spain) Rusber Estrada	C	Two home runs and seven RBIs
(Nicaragua) Ronald Medrano	SP	Five IP and eight strikeouts
(Chinese Taipei) Yu Chang	SS	7-for-18 with four doubles and a home run
(Chinese Taipei) Jo-Hsi Hsu	RP	Five strikeouts in 3 2/3 innings of work
(Colombia) Julio Teherán	SP	No hits in first five innings
(Colombia) Brayan Buelvas	OF	5-for-11 with a double, triple, four RBIs and a stolen base
(Germany) Simon Baumgardt	2B	Six hits, three walks, two RBIs and a stolen base

== Broadcast ==
On February 3, alongside the first pool roster reveals, it was announced that the 2025 WBC qualifiers would be shown on the WBC YouTube channel, WBC Facebook page, MLB.tv and WBC website (WorldBaseballClassic.com). MLB Network will also broadcast select games for all its covered areas (including US).

Like the 2022 qualifiers, qualifiers and already qualified teams also have broadcast partners locally, as follows:

Territory	Rights holder(s)	Ref.
Brazil	ESPN Brasil (Note: Brazil games only); Disney+	
China	BesTV; Douyin; Bilibili; Weixin; Weibo; Kuaishou; QQ; Tencent Video	
Colombia	Win Sports (Note: Colombia games only); Ditu; One Baseball Network; Disney+	
Germany	Sportdigital	
Latin America (excluding Brazil)	One Baseball Network; BeisbolPlay; Disney+	
Panama	COS Panamá; MLB Network	
South Korea	SpoTV	
Sub-Saharan Africa	ESPN Africa (Note: South Africa games only)	
Taiwan	EBC (Note: Cable broadcast only; not applied to EBC News YouTube livestream); ELTA Sports; VL Sports; Chunghwa Telecom (MOD & Hami Video)	
United States	MLB Network; Fox Sports 2; Fox Deportes	
Bahamas	MLB Network	
Bonaire	MLB Network	
Canada	MLB Network	
Cayman Islands	MLB Network	
Curaçao	MLB Network	
Puerto Rico	MLB Network	
US Virgin Islands	MLB Network	
Sint Maarten	MLB Network	

== See also ==
- List of sporting events in Taiwan
