= 1976 Amateur World Series =

Tournament details
- Country: Colombia
- Teams: 11
- Defending champions: Cuba

Final positions
- Champions: Cuba (14th title)
- Runners-up: Puerto Rico
- Third place: Japan
- Fourth place: Nicaragua

The 1976 Amateur World Series was the 24th edition of the Amateur World Series (AWS), an international men's amateur baseball tournament. The tournament was sanctioned by the International Baseball Federation and took place, for the fourth time, in Colombia.

There were 11 participating countries, including first-time participant South Korea. The tournament was won by Cuba, its 14th AWS victory and – excluding the FEMBA championships of 1973 and 1974 which Cuba did not participate in – its sixth consecutive title.

== Final standings ==
| Rank | Team |
|---|---|
| 1st place, gold medalist(s) | Cuba |
| 2nd place, silver medalist(s) | Puerto Rico |
| 3rd place, bronze medalist(s) | Japan |
| 4 | Nicaragua |
| 5 | Dominican Republic |
| 6 | South Korea |
| 7 | Chinese Taipei |
| 8 | Colombia |
| 9 | Panama |
| 10 | Mexico |
| 11 | Netherlands |
