= Pedro Medina (baseball) =

Cuban baseball player (born 1883)

- Pitcher
- Born: 1883; Cuba
- Died: Unknown
- Batted: Right Threw: Right

Negro league baseball debut
- 1906, for the Cuban Stars (West)

Last appearance
- 1907, for the Cuban Stars (West)

Teams
- Cuban Stars (West) (1906–1907)

Pedro Medina (1883 – death date unknown) was a Cuban pitcher in the Negro leagues and Cuban League in the 1900s.

A native of Cuba, Medina played in the Negro leagues for the Cuban Stars (West) in 1906 and 1907. He also played several seasons in the Cuban League for the Almendares, Club Fé, Habana, and Matanzas clubs.
