= Pacific Ocean Games =

Multi-sport event between countries of the Pacific Rim

- Host city: Cali, Colombia
- Nations: 38 (invited)
- Athletes: 3000 (invited)
- Events: 13
- Opening: June 23
- Closing: July 3
- Opened by: President Ernesto Samper
- Main venue: Estadio Olímpico Pascual Guerrero

The Pacific Ocean Games (Spanish: Juegos del Océano Pacífico) was a multi-sport event between countries of the Pacific Rim. It was held only once, in 1995 from June 23 to July 3 in Cali, Colombia. Some events were also hosted in the Colombian cities of Buenaventura, Armenia, Pereira, Manizales, Popayán.

== Overview ==
Led by Jorge Herrera Barona, the head of the Colombian Olympic Committee, the games followed on from the country's hosting of the 1971 Pan American Games and 1978 Central American and Caribbean Games. A total of thirteen sports were contested, with 38 nations and around 3000 athletes making the start lists. The Estadio Olímpico Pascual Guerrero in Cali was the main stadium for the event.

The games were opened by Colombian President Ernesto Samper. The opening ceremony featured Colombian orchestras, a ballet by Sonia Osorio (Leyenda de El Dorado), a fashion show of clothing designed by Carlos Arturo Zapata, and dancing exhibitions to music including currulao and salsa. The inauguration was linked with the hosting of the first Congress of National Olympic Committees of the Pacific Rim (ODECOP).

This grouping proved short-lived and despite an agreement to host the next Pacific Ocean Games in 1999 in Santiago de Chile, and a 2001 Games Vancouver, Canada, the games were disbanded. The host nation had hoped the 1995 event would raise its profile in the region and attract tourists, but many of the city's hotels remained relatively unoccupied during the games.

The hosts Colombia easily topped the medal table with 72 golds and 212 medals overall – a number that equalled the combined total medals taken by the next three most successful nations: the United States, China and Taiwan. This reflected the lack of high level competitors sent by the other nations invited to Colombia.

It was the first time a games was held for the region, building upon previous individual international sports competitions, such as the track and field-based Pacific Conference Games (1969–1985), the Pan Pacific Swimming Championships (launched 1985) and gymnastics-based Pacific Rim Championships (launched 1988).

== Sports ==
- Athletics
- Baseball
- Boxing
- Cycling
- Gymnastics
  - Artistic gymnastics
  - Rhythmic gymnastics
- Judo
- Roller skating
- Swimming
- Synchronised swimming
- Volleyball
- Water polo
- Wrestling

== Participating nations ==
- American Samoa
- Australia
- Brunei
- Canada
- Chile
- China
- Chinese Taipei
- Colombia
- Cook Islands
- Costa Rica
- Ecuador
- El Salvador
- Guam
- Guatemala
- Fiji
- Honduras
- Hong Kong
- Indonesia
- Japan
- Malaysia
- Mexico
- New Zealand
- Nicaragua
- North Korea
- Panama
- Papua New Guinea
- Peru
- Philippines
- Russia
- Samoa
- Singapore
- Solomon Islands
- South Korea
- Thailand
- Tonga
- United States
- Vanuatu
- Vietnam
