= Baseball at the 1971 Pan American Games =

- Venues: Cali, Colombia
- Competitors: 9 teams

Medalists
Gold medal	Cuba
Silver medal	United States
Bronze medal	Colombia

Baseball at the 1971 Pan American Games was contested between teams representing Canada, Colombia, Cuba, Dominican Republic, Mexico, Nicaragua, Puerto Rico, United States, and Venezuela. The 1971 edition was the sixth Pan American Games, and was hosted by Cali.

== Medal summary ==
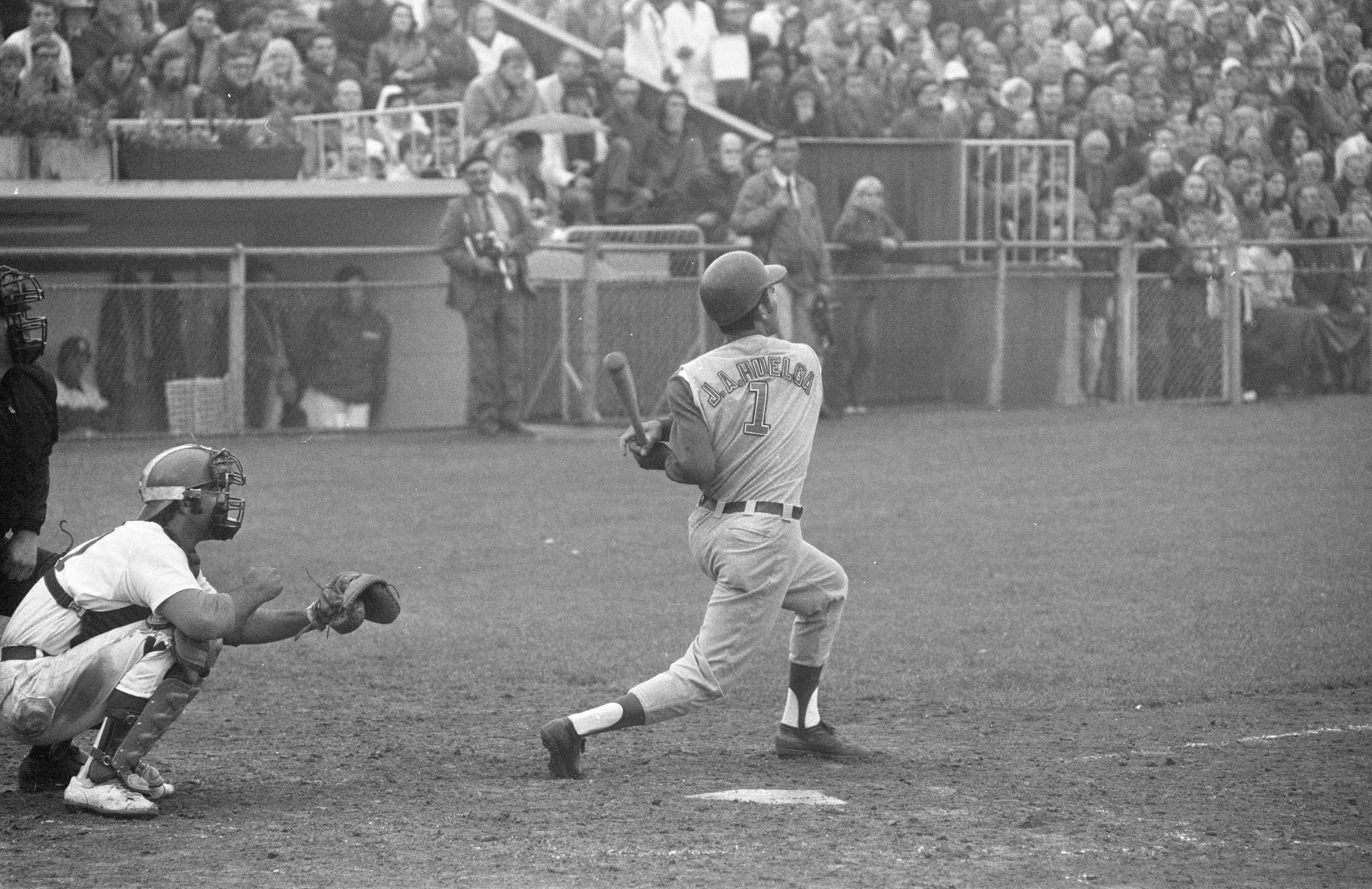
José Antonio Huelga, pictured at the 1972 Haarlem Baseball Week

=== Medal table ===
Rank	Nation	Gold	Silver	Bronze	Total
1	Cuba	1	0	0	1
2	United States	0	1	0	1
3	Colombia	0	0	1	1
Totals (3 entries)		1	1	1	3

=== Medalists ===
Event	Gold	Silver	Bronze
Men's	Cuba: Wilfredo Sánchez; Silvio Montejo; Félix Isasi; Armando Capiró; Agustín Marquetti; Vicente Díaz; Lázaro Pérez; Rodolfo Puente; Emilio Salgado; Urbano González; Lázaro Martínez; Rigoberto Rosique; Rolando Macías; Óscar Romero; Braudilio Vinent; José Antonio Huelga; Walfrido Ruíz; Antônio González	United States: Eddie Bane; Alan Bannister; Larry Calufetti; John Caneira; Bernardo Castillo; Peter Helt; Clifton Holland; Mario Hewitt; Fred Lynn; James Steele; Jerry Tabb; Jackson Todd; Alton Torregano; Fred Mims; Paul Patterson; Jeffrey Port; Kenneth Reed; Jay Smith	Colombia: José Corpas; Luis Herrera; Luis Escobar; Abel Leal; Luis Gaviria; Humberto Bayuelo; Pompeyo Llamas; Daniel Blanco; Rene Morelos; Remberto Madera; Luis Santos; Alejandro Lian; Alcibiades Jaramillo; Erasmo Marimon; Evaristo Martínez; Orlando Ramírez; Adolfo Jiménez; Benjamin Herrera; Orlando García
