= 1956 Caribbean Series =

1956 baseball tournament

Tournament details
- Country: Panama
- City: Panama City
- Venue(s): 1 (in 1 host city)
- Dates: 10–15 February
- Teams: 4

Final positions
- Champions: (Cuba) Elefantes de Cienfuegos (1st title)
- Runners-up: (Panama) Chesterfield Smokers

Awards
- MVP: (Cuba) Ray Noble

The eighth edition of the Caribbean Series (Serie del Caribe) was played in 1956. It was held from February 10 through February 15, featuring the champion baseball teams of Cuba, Elefantes de Cienfuegos; Panama, Chesterfield Smokers; Puerto Rico, Criollos de Caguas and Venezuela, Industriales de Valencia. The format consisted of 12 games, each team facing the other teams twice. The games were played at Estadio Olímpico de Panamá in Panama City, Panama.

== Summary ==
In this edition, Cienfuegos won the first of five consecutive Series titles for the Cuban team. Cienfuegos was managed by Oscar Rodríguez and finished with a 5-1 record. The pitching staff was guided by Camilo Pascual (2-0, 11 strikeouts, 2.50 ERA), Pedro Ramos (2-0, 1.59 ERA) and René Gutiérrez (1-0, 0.00 ERA in 9 1/3 innings). The offense was clearly led by catcher and Series MVP Ray Noble (.400 BA, one home run, .654 OBP and 1B Bob Boyd (.304 BA, one HR, 11 RBI, .522 SLG). Other contributions came from 2B Curt Roberts (.375, one HR, six runs, .542 SLG), Chico Fernández (.269, 10 runs, one HR) and 3B Milt Smith (two HR, .522 SLG). The roster also included IF Ossie Alvarez, OFs Prentice Browne and Archie Wilson and Ps Sandalio Consuegra, Seth Morehead and Gene Bearden, among others.

Panama, with Standford Graham at the helm, posted a 3-3 record to tie Puerto Rico for second place. Ps Don Elston, Ross Grimsley and Wally Burnette got the victories while 1B Elías Osorio (.286, 3 HR, .762 SLG) led the offense. Grimsley made the All-Star team, as well as OFs Bobby Prescott and Bill Stewart. The line up was also filled with Héctor López (2B), Humberto Robinson (P), David Roberts (OF) and Joe Tuminelli (3B).

Puerto Rico was managed by Ben Geraghty and got wins from Taylor Phillips, Roberto Vargas and Chi-Chi Olivo, while 1B Lou Limmer (.350, three HR, six runs, eight RBI) provided punch in the lineup. Also in the roster were Ps Tom Lasorda and Paul Stuffel, and Cs Bill Cash and Ray Murray; IFs Daryl Spencer (2B), Víctor Pellot Power (3B) and Félix Mantilla (SS), as well as OFs Wes Covington and Chuck Harmon.

Venezuela was managed by Regino Otero and finished in last place with a 1-5 mark. The team was outscored by their opponents 47-14. Bright spots were Ps Turk Farrell and Jim Pearce. Farrell recorded the lone win against Puerto Rico in a one-run, one-hit effort, while Pearce took an 11-inning, 2-1 loss to Panama, striking out nine batters without giving a walk. Valencia also featured Ed Bailey (C), Tommy Brown (1B), Elio Chacón (CF), Emilio Cueche (P), Julián Ladera (P) and Ron Mrozinski (P).

== Participating teams ==
Team	Manager
(Panama) Chesterfield Smokers	(United States) Standford Graham
(Puerto Rico) Criollos de Caguas	(United States) Ben Geraghty
(Cuba) Elefantes de Cienfuegos	(Cuba) Oscar Rodríguez
(Venezuela) Industriales de Valencia	(Cuba) Regino Otero

== Final standings ==
Pos	Team	Pld	W	L	RF	RA	RD	PCT	GB
1	(Cuba) Elefantes de Cienfuegos	6	5	1	43	19	+24	.833	—
2	(Panama) Chesterfield Smokers (H)	6	3	3	41	30	+11	.500	2
3	(Puerto Rico) Criollos de Caguas	6	3	3	30	32	−2	.500	2
4	(Venezuela) Industriales de Valencia	6	1	5	14	47	−33	.167	4

Source: CBPC
(H) Hosts

=== Scoreboards ===
==== Game 1, February 10 ====
Team	1	2	3	4	5	6	7	8	9	R	H	E
Puerto Rico	0	1	0	0	0	0	0	0	0	1	1	2
Venezuela	0	0	0	0	2	0	4	0	X	6	9	1
WP: Turk Farrell (1-0) LP: Paul Stuffel (0-1); Home runs: PUR: Ramón Maldonado (1); VEN: Ed Bailey (1)

==== Game 2, February 10 ====
Team	1	2	3	4	5	6	7	8	9	R	H	E
Cuba	0	0	0	6	2	2	1	0	2	13	16	1
Panama	0	0	0	2	0	2	1	0	0	5	6	2
WP: Camilo Pascual (1-0) LP: Ross Grimsley (0-1); Home runs: CUB: Milt Smith (1); PAN: None

==== Game 3, February 11 ====
Team	1	2	3	4	5	6	7	8	9	R	H	E
Venezuela	0	1	0	0	0	0	0	0	4	5	9	2
Cuba	2	4	0	0	0	0	2	1	X	9	13	2
WP: Pedro Ramos (1-0) LP: Emilio Cueche (0-1)

==== Game 4, February 11 ====
Team	1	2	3	4	5	6	7	8	9	R	H	E
Panama	1	0	0	0	0	0	0	2	0	3	7	2
Puerto Rico	0	0	0	2	0	3	0	0	X	5	8	1
WP: Chi-Chi Olivo (1-0) LP: Wally Burnette (0-1); Home runs: PAN: Elías Osorio (1); PUR: Lou Limmer (1)

==== Game 5, February 12 ====
Team	1	2	3	4	5	6	7	8	9	R	H	E
Cuba	1	0	0	0	0	0	1	0	2	4	7	1
Puerto Rico	0	1	1	0	1	0	0	4	X	7	11	0
WP: Taylor Phillips (1-0) LP: Sandalio Consuegra (0-1); Home runs: CUB: None; PUR: Victor Pellot (1), Ramón Maldonado (2), Lou Limmer (2)

==== Game 6, February 12 ====
Team	1	2	3	4	5	6	7	8	9	10	11	R	H	E
Panama	0	1	0	0	0	0	0	0	0	0	1	2	7	1
Venezuela	0	0	0	1	0	0	0	0	0	0	0	1	7	0
WP: Don Elston (1-0) LP: Jim Pearce (0-1); Home runs: PAN: Héctor López (1), Bill Stewart (1); VEN: None

==== Game 7, February 13 ====
Team	1	2	3	4	5	6	7	8	9	R	H	E
Venezuela	0	0	0	0	0	0	2	0	0	2	6	0
Puerto Rico	3	1	2	1	0	3	0	0	X	10	14	0
WP: Roberto Vargas (1-0) LP: Ron Mrozinski (0-1); Home runs: VEN: None; PUR: Chuck Harmon (1), Daryl Spencer (1)

==== Game 8, February 13 ====
Team	1	2	3	4	5	6	7	8	9	R	H	E
Panama	0	0	0	0	0	0	0	0	0	0	2	1
Cuba	0	0	1	0	0	4	0	1	X	6	8	1
WP: René Gutiérrez (1-0) LP: Humberto Robinson (0-1); Home runs: PAN: None; CUB: Archie Wilson (1), Milt Smith (2)

==== Game 9, February 14 ====
Team	1	2	3	4	5	6	7	8	9	R	H	E
Cuba	0	0	0	3	0	0	0	0	4	7	7	0
Venezuela	0	0	0	0	0	0	0	0	0	0	4	2
WP: Camilo Pascual (2-0) LP: Turk Farrell (0-1); Home runs: CUB: Ossie Alvarez (1), Bob Boyd (1); VEN: None

==== Game 10, February 14 ====
Team	1	2	3	4	5	6	7	8	9	R	H	E
Puerto Rico	0	2	0	0	0	1	0	0	2	5	9	5
Panama	2	2	5	3	0	1	0	0	X	13	16	3
WP: Ross Grimsley (1-1) LP: Chi-Chi Olivo (1-1)

==== Game 11, February 15 ====
Team	1	2	3	4	5	6	7	8	9	R	H	E
Puerto Rico	0	0	0	0	0	0	1	1	0	2	7	1
Cuba	1	0	0	0	3	0	0	0	X	4	5	1
WP: Pedro Ramos (2-0) LP: Paul Stuffel (0-2); Home runs: PUR: Lou Limmer (3); CUB: Chico Fernández (1)

==== Game 12, February 15 ====
Team	1	2	3	4	5	6	7	8	9	R	H	E
Venezuela	0	0	0	0	0	0	0	0	0	0	4	1
Panama	4	5	1	0	0	3	4	1	X	18	16	2
WP: Wally Burnette (1-1) LP: Ron Mrozinski (0-2); Home runs: VEN: None; PAN: Elías Osorio 2 (3), Clyde Parrish (1), Héctor López (2), Denny Schell (1)

== Statistics leaders ==
Statistic	Player	Team	Total
Batting average	(Cuba) Ray Noble	(Cuba) Elefantes de Cienfuegos	.400
Home runs	(United States) Lou Limmer	(Puerto Rico) Criollos de Caguas	3
Home runs	(Panama) Elías Osorio	(Panama) Chesterfield Smokers	3
Runs batted in	(United States) Bob Boyd	(Cuba) Elefantes de Cienfuegos	11
Runs	(Cuba) Chico Fernández	(Cuba) Elefantes de Cienfuegos	10
Stolen bases	(United States) Curt Roberts	(Cuba) Elefantes de Cienfuegos	2
Wins	(Cuba) Camilo Pascual	(Cuba) Elefantes de Cienfuegos	2
Wins	(Cuba) Pedro Ramos	(Cuba) Elefantes de Cienfuegos	2
Earned run average	(Cuba) René Gutiérrez	(Cuba) Elefantes de Cienfuegos	0.00
Strikeouts	(Cuba) Camilo Pascual	(Cuba) Elefantes de Cienfuegos	12
Innings pitched	(United States) Turk Farrell	(Venezuela) Industriales de Valencia	18.0
Innings pitched	(Cuba) Camilo Pascual	(Cuba) Elefantes de Cienfuegos	18.0

== Awards ==
Tournament Awards
Award	Player	Team
MVP	(Cuba) Ray Noble	(Cuba) Elefantes de Cienfuegos
Best manager	(Cuba) Oscar Rodríguez	(Cuba) Elefantes de Cienfuegos

All Star Team
Position	Player	Team
First base	(United States) Lou Limmer	(Puerto Rico) Criollos de Caguas
Second base	(United States) Curt Roberts	(Cuba) Elefantes de Cienfuegos
Third base	(Puerto Rico) Vic Power	(Puerto Rico) Criollos de Caguas
Shortstop	(Cuba) Chico Fernández	(Cuba) Elefantes de Cienfuegos
Left field	(Puerto Rico) Ray Maldonado	(Puerto Rico) Criollos de Caguas
Center field	(United States) Bill Stewart	(Panama) Chesterfield Smokers
Right field	(Panama) Bobby Prescott	(Panama) Chesterfield Smokers
Catcher	(Cuba) Ray Noble	(Cuba) Elefantes de Cienfuegos
Pitcher	(Cuba) Camilo Pascual	(Cuba) Elefantes de Cienfuegos

== See also ==
- Ballplayers who have played in the Series

== Sources ==
- Antero Núñez, José. Series del Caribe. Jefferson, Caracas, Venezuela: Impresos Urbina, C.A., 1987.
- Gutiérrez, Daniel. Enciclopedia del Béisbol en Venezuela – 1895–2006 . Caracas, Venezuela: Impresión Arte, C.A., 2007.
