= 1956 Global World Series =

International baseball competition held in Milwaukee, Wisconsin

Tournament details
- Teams: 8
- Defending champions: United States

Final positions
- Champions: United States
- Runners-up: Hawaii
- Third place: Japan
- Fourth place: Mexico

The 1956 Global World Series was the second edition of the Global World Series, an international baseball tournament organized by the International Baseball Congress in the mid-1950s. It was held in Milwaukee from September 7 to 13, 1956.

== Background ==
The Global World Series emerged as an alternative tournament to the Amateur World Series (AWS), the internationally sanctioned baseball world championship, which was last held in 1953, and would not be held again until 1961. While the AWS was strictly for amateurs and did not allow professional baseball players, the Global World Series was organized by the semi-professional National Baseball Congress (NBC), under the auspices of NBC President Ray Dumont and former Major League Baseball Commissioner Happy Chandler. The first edition of the tournament was held in 1955, with the United States (represented by a semi-pro club from Wichita, Kansas) taking the gold medal.

== Participants ==
The 1956 United States squad was represented by the Allen Dairymen, a semi-pro team from Fort Wayne, Indiana. The team included two players with Negro league experience: John Kennedy, who would soon become the first African American to play for the Philadelphia Phillies, and Wilmer Fields, an all-star with the Homestead Grays. It also included Don Pavletich, a future catcher for the Cincinnati Reds.

Japan was represented by the Yokohama Nippon Oil club, which won the 1956 intercity baseball tournament. The team, managed by Keiichiro Masuyama, was captained by outfielder Tokichiro Ishii and included pitcher Motoshi Fujita, a future player and manager of the Yomiuri Giants of Nippon Professional Baseball. Yu Hanai, billed in American media as "the Babe Ruth of Japan", would go on to play with the Nishitetsu Lions of NPB.

The Canadian representatives were the North Battleford Beavers, champions of the Western Canada League; the team was led by player-manager Emile Francis, best known as a professional ice hockey coach and former player. Hawaii was again represented by the Honolulu Red Sox, managed by Lawrence Kunihisa. One pitcher, John Sardinha, would later play two seasons in Japan with the Nankai Hawks.

The other national teams were true all-star selections. Carlos "Petaca" Rodríguez was on the Colombian team. The Netherlands national team, winners of the 1956 European Baseball Championship, were managed by Henk Keulemans and headlined by pitchers Jan Smidt and Han Urbanus. Puerto Rico included Félix Torres, recently of the Reds system, who would later play with the Los Angeles Angels.

== Venue ==
Milwaukee, Wisconsin	1956 Global World Series is located in Wisconsin
Milwaukee County Stadium	1956 Global World Series is located in Wisconsin
Capacity: 15,000	1956 Global World Series is located in Wisconsin

== Results ==
Pos	Team	Pld	W	L	RF	RA	RD	PCT
1	United States (H)	5	4	1	29	12	+17	.800
2	Hawaii	6	4	2	27	13	+14	.667
3	Japan	5	3	2	19	18	+1	.600
4	Mexico	4	2	2	13	26	−13	.500
5	Puerto Rico	3	1	2	19	12	+7	.333
6	Colombia	3	1	2	14	12	+2	.333
7	Canada	2	0	2	5	15	−10	.000
8	Netherlands	2	0	2	3	21	−18	.000

(H) Hosts

September 7, 1956; 8:00 (UTC-6)	Canada	4–5	Japan	Milwaukee County Stadium, Milwaukee

September 8, 1956; 13:00 (UTC-6)	Hawaii	3–5	United States	Milwaukee County Stadium, Milwaukee

September 8, 1956; 18:00 (UTC-6)	Netherlands	2–14 (F/7)	Puerto Rico	Milwaukee County Stadium, Milwaukee

September 8, 1956	Mexico	8–5	Colombia	Milwaukee County Stadium, Milwaukee

September 9, 1956; 13:00 (UTC-6)	Colombia	7–1	Netherlands	Milwaukee County Stadium, Milwaukee

September 9, 1956	Hawaii	10–1 (F/8)	Canada	Milwaukee County Stadium, Milwaukee

September 9, 1956; 18:00 (UTC-6)	United States	6–2	Puerto Rico	Milwaukee County Stadium, Milwaukee

September 9, 1956	Japan	5–0	Mexico	Milwaukee County Stadium, Milwaukee

September 10, 1956; 12:30 (UTC-6)	Japan	6–3	United States	Milwaukee County Stadium, Milwaukee

September 10, 1956; 18:00 (UTC-6)	Puerto Rico	3–4	Mexico	Milwaukee County Stadium, Milwaukee

September 10, 1956	Colombia	2–3	Hawaii	Milwaukee County Stadium, Milwaukee

September 11, 1956; 18:00 (UTC-6)	Mexico	1–13 (F/6)	United States	Milwaukee County Stadium, Milwaukee

September 11, 1956	Hawaii	2–0	Japan	Milwaukee County Stadium, Milwaukee

September 11, 1956; 18:00 (UTC-6)	Japan	3–9	Hawaii	Milwaukee County Stadium, Milwaukee

September 11, 1956; 18:00 (UTC-6)	United States	2–0	Hawaii	Milwaukee County Stadium, Milwaukee

== Final standings ==
Rk	Team	W	L	
1	United States	4	1	Gold medal
2	Hawaii	4	2	Silver medal
3	Japan	3	2	Bronze medal
Eliminated after four games
4	Mexico	2	2	
Eliminated after three games
5	Puerto Rico	1	2	
6	Colombia	1	2	
Eliminated after two games
7	Canada	0	2	
8	Netherlands	0	2	

== Honors and awards ==
=== All-Star team ===
Position	Name
Catchers	(United States) Pete Stammen
Catchers	(Hawaii) Minoru Miyahara
Infielders	(United States) Olin Smith
Infielders	(Mexico) Miguel Fernández
Infielders	(Hawaii) Shin Yogi
Infielders	(Canada) Art Stone
Infielders	(United States) John Kennedy
Infielders	(Hawaii) Tsune Watanabe
Infielders	(Puerto Rico) Ace Robinson
Outfielders	(Hawaii) Larry Kamishima
Outfielders	(United States) Charles Huwer
Outfielders	(United States) Wilmer Fields
Outfielders	(Japan) Yasusuke Obuchi
Outfielders	(Colombia) Carlos Bustos
Pitchers	(United States) Pete Olson
Pitchers	(Japan) Motoji Fujita
Pitchers	(Hawaii) John Sardinha
Pitchers	(United States) Walter Wherry
Pitchers	(Hawaii) Len Kasparovitch
Manager	(United States) John Braden

== See also ==
- 1956 World Series
- 1953 Amateur World Series

== Bibliography ==
- Buege, Bob (Spring 2012). "Global World Series: 1955-57". SABR. Society for American Baseball Research.
