= John Sardinha =

American baseball player

- Pitcher
- Born: December 6, 1931; Pu'unene, Territory of Hawaii
- Died: February 19, 2018 (aged 86); Kahului, Hawaii, US
- Batted: Right Threw: Right

NPB debut
- 1959, for the Nankai Hawks

NPB statistics
- Win–loss: 12–13
- Earned run average: 3.28
- Strikeouts: 99

Teams
- Nankai Hawks (1959–1960)
Medals
Representing Hawaii
Global World Series
Silver medal – second place	1956 Milwaukee	Team

John Thomas Sardinha (December 21, 1931 – February 19, 2018) was an American baseball pitcher who played with the Nankai Hawks of Japan's Nippon Professional Baseball for two seasons, 1959 and 1960.

Sardinha played amateur baseball on Maui, as well as with the Honolulu Asahis club. He played with the Hawaii national baseball team at the 1956 Global World Series, held at Milwaukee County Stadium, home of the Milwaukee Braves. In an eight-inning contest against Canada, he allowed only three hits; he also held Japan to three runs in the tie-breaker semifinal.

In 1959, he joined Andy Miyamoto and Ichiro Maehara as players from Pu'unene playing professional baseball in Japan. His debut with Nankai was his first stint in professional baseball. A submarine pitcher, Sardinha started the season off hot but overworked himself. Nankai won the 1959 Japan Series, though he did not play.

== See also ==
- American expatriate baseball players in Japan
