= 1960 Caribbean Series =

1960 baseball tournament

Tournament details
- Country: Panama
- City: Panama City
- Venue(s): 1 (in 1 host city)
- Dates: 10–15 February
- Teams: 4

Final positions
- Champions: (Cuba) Elefantes de Cienfuegos (2nd title)
- Runners-up: (Panama) Marlboro Smokers

Awards
- MVP: (Cuba) Camilo Pascual

The twelfth edition of the Caribbean Series (Serie del Caribe) was a baseball tournament held from February 10 through February 15, 1960 featuring the champion teams from Cuba (Cienfuegos), Panama (Marlboro), Puerto Rico (Caguas) and Venezuela (Rapiños). The format consisted of 12 games, each team facing the other teams twice, and the games were played at Estadio Nacional of Panama City.

It was the final edition of the first stage of the CBWS, after MLB Commissioner Ford Frick banned American players from playing in Cuba for the 1960-61 winter season. As response, in March 1961 the Fidel Castro government would decree the abolition of professional sport in Cuba. The Series would be suspended until 1970, reconstituting without Cuba and Panama, while adding the Dominican Republic. Cuba would return to the Series in 2014.

For the seventh time, and fifth consecutive year, Cuba won the CBWS championship with an undefeated record of 6-0.

== Summary ==
The Cuban team, managed by Tony Castaño, was led by a pitching staff anchored by big leaguers Camilo Pascual, who went 2-0 with 15 strikeouts including a one-hit shutout, and Pedro Ramos (one win, one save) and Orlando Peña (one win, one save). The offense was paced by outfielder George Altman, who co-led the series hitters with a .438 average, and first baseman Rogelio Alvarez (.333, two HR, .750 SLG, six runs, 10 RBI), second baseman Cookie Rojas (.429, one HR), OF Dan Dobbek (2 HR, .800 SLG) and OF Tony González (.429). Catcher Ray Noble and shortstop Leo Cárdenas also contributed in the defense.

Panama ended in second place with a 3-3 mark and was led by catcher/manager Wilmer Shantz. The team led the Series with 45 runs, powered by OF Eddie Napoleón, who shared the batting title with George Altman, as well 1B/OF Stan Palys (two HR, 12 RBI, 6 runs, .704 SLG), Héctor López (.370, 2 HR, 10 RBI, two stolen bases) and Lee Tate (eight runs, three doubles). Also in the roster were pitchers Bob Milo, Ken Rowe, Humberto Robinson and Robert Waltz, outfielder Joe Caffie and 1B Jim Gentile, who was injured at the start.

Puerto Rico, managed by first baseman Vic Power, finished third with a 2-4 record. The team led the tournament with 10 home runs but only scored 27 runs. OF Tommy Davis was named the Series Most Valuable Player after hitting .409 with three homers, six RBI, seven runs, two stolen bases, and a .818 SLG%. Other contributions came from third baseman Woody Huyke (.350, one HR, .500 SLG), SS Félix Torres (3 HR), and OF/1B Orlando Cepeda (.333, .524 SLG, two SB). The team's two victories came from pitchers Earl Wilson (1-1, 15 strikeouts in 15 innings pitched) and Juan Pizarro (1-1, 16 SO in 14 IP).

Venezuela was represented by the Occidental League champion as a late replacement after a players strike in the Venezuelan Professional Baseball League. The Rapiños team ended in last place with a 1-5 record and was managed by Les Moss. Venezuela's only victory came at expense of Puerto Rico behind a strong pitching effort by Ed Hobaugh. The starting rotation was depleted after Julián Ladera was injured, while Billy Muffett (0-2, 6.00 ERA) was a notable weak spot, even though he pitched a 12-inning complete game. The offense was guided by CF Willie Davis (.333, .593 SLG, two SB) and 3B Luis García (.333, one HR, .542 SLG). 2B Bob Aspromonte and SS Luis Aparicio provided a solid middle infield defense.

== Participating teams ==
Team	Manager
(Cuba) Elefantes de Cienfuegos	(Cuba) Tony Castaño
(Panama) Marlboro Smokers	(United States) Billy Shantz
(Puerto Rico) Criollos de Caguas	(Puerto Rico) Vic Power
(Venezuela) Rapiños de Occidente	(United States) Les Moss

== Final standings ==
Pos	Team	Pld	W	L	RF	RA	RD	PCT	GB
1	(Cuba) Elefantes de Cienfuegos	6	6	0	36	21	+15	1.000	—
2	(Panama) Marlboro Smokers	6	3	3	45	36	+9	.500	3
3	(Puerto Rico) Criollos de Caguas	6	2	4	27	28	−1	.333	4
4	(Venezuela) Rapiños de Occidente (H)	6	1	5	26	49	−23	.167	5

Source: CBPC
(H) Hosts

=== Scoreboards ===
==== Game 1, February 10 ====
Team	1	2	3	4	5	6	7	8	9	R	H	E
Cuba	0	0	0	2	3	0	3	0	0	8	13	2
Venezuela	0	0	0	3	0	0	0	2	0	5	12	1
WP: Camilo Pascual (1-0) LP: Billy Muffett (0-1)

==== Game 2, February 10 ====
Team	1	2	3	4	5	6	7	8	9	R	H	E
Puerto Rico	0	0	3	1	0	0	0	0	0	4	9	1
Panama	0	0	0	0	0	0	2	1	0	3	5	3
WP: Juan Pizarro (1-0) LP: Humberto Robinson (0-1)

==== Game 3, February 11 ====
Team	1	2	3	4	5	6	7	8	9	R	H	E
Puerto Rico	0	0	0	0	0	0	0	0	2	2	7	1
Cuba	0	2	0	0	0	0	0	2	x	4	2	1
WP: Raúl Sánchez (1-0) LP: Earl Wilson (0-1) Sv: Pedro Ramos (1); Home runs: PRI: Tommy Davis (1); CUB: Dan Dobbek (1)

==== Game 4, February 11 ====
Team	1	2	3	4	5	6	7	8	9	R	H	E
Panama	3	3	0	0	0	4	0	0	6	16	21	1
Venezuela	0	0	0	0	0	0	2	0	1	3	6	3
WP: Robert Milo (1-0) LP: Ted Bowsfield (0-1); Home runs: PAN: Héctor López 2 (2), Bob Perry (1), Stan Palys (1); VEN: Les Peden (1), Luis García (1)

==== Game 5, February 12 ====
Team	1	2	3	4	5	6	7	8	9	R	H	E
Venezuela	3	0	0	0	0	1	2	0	0	6	9	0
Puerto Rico	0	1	0	0	0	0	1	0	2	4	9	3
WP: Ed Hobaugh (1-0) LP: George Brunet (0-1); Home runs: VEN: None; PRI: Tommy Davis (2), Woody Huyke (1), Félix Torres (1)

==== Game 6, February 12 ====
Team	1	2	3	4	5	6	7	8	9	R	H	E
Panama	2	0	1	0	0	0	1	0	0	4	8	0
Cuba	1	0	0	0	0	0	1	0	4	6	12	0
WP: Pedro Carrillo (1-0) LP: Bill Kirk (0-1); Home runs: PAN: Joe Caffie (1); CUB: Rogelio Alvarez (1), Dan Dobbek (2)

==== Game 7, February 13 ====
Team	1	2	3	4	5	6	7	8	9	R	H	E
Venezuela	0	0	0	1	0	0	0	1	1	3	7	1
Cuba	0	2	0	0	0	0	0	0	2	4	7	0
WP: Orlando Peña (1-0) LP: Al Grunwald (0-1); Home runs: VEN: Willie Davis (1); CUB: Rogelio Alvarez (2)

==== Game 8, February 13 ====
Team	1	2	3	4	5	6	7	8	9	R	H	E
Panama	2	0	2	0	0	4	0	0	0	8	10	1
Puerto Rico	2	0	2	0	2	0	1	0	0	7	13	4
WP: Ken Rowe (1-0) LP: Juan Pizarro (1-1) Sv: Robert Waltz (1); Home runs: PAN: Eddie Napoleón (1); PRI: None

==== Game 9, February 14 ====
Team	1	2	3	4	5	6	7	8	9	R	H	E
Cuba	0	0	0	2	0	0	0	1	1	4	12	0
Puerto Rico	0	0	0	0	0	0	0	0	0	0	1	1
WP: Camilo Pascual (2-0) LP: José Santiago (0-1)

==== Game 10, February 14 ====
Team	1	2	3	4	5	6	7	8	9	10	11	12	R	H	E
Venezuela	0	0	0	0	4	0	0	1	0	0	0	1	6	11	0
Panama	0	2	3	0	0	0	0	0	0	0	0	2	7	15	3
WP: Robert Waltz (1-0) LP: Billy Muffett (0-2); Home runs: VEN: Luis Aparicio (1); PAN: Elías Osorio (1), Al Grunwald (1)

==== Game 11, February 15 ====
Team	1	2	3	4	5	6	7	8	9	R	H	E
Puerto Rico	0	0	0	0	4	0	3	0	3	10	15	4
Venezuela	1	0	0	0	0	0	0	1	1	3	11	5
WP: Earl Wilson (1-1) LP: Ed Hobaugh (1-1); Home runs: PRI: Frank Rivera (1); VEN: None

==== Game 12, February 15 ====
Team	1	2	3	4	5	6	7	8	9	R	H	E
Cuba	0	2	6	0	1	0	0	0	1	10	12	3
Panama	0	0	3	0	0	0	4	0	0	7	6	4
WP: Pedro Ramos (1-0) LP: Leonardo Martínez (0-1); Home runs: CUB: Cookie Rojas (1); PAN: Stan Palys (2)

== Statistics leaders ==
Statistic	Player	Team	Total
Batting average	(United States) George Altman	(Cuba) Elefantes de Cienfuegos	.450
Batting average	(United States) Ed Napoleon	(Panama) Marlboro Smokers	.450
Home runs	(United States) Tommy Davis	(Puerto Rico) Criollos de Caguas	3
Home runs	(Panama) Héctor López	(Panama) Marlboro Smokers	3
Home runs	(Puerto Rico) Félix Torres	(Puerto Rico) Criollos de Caguas	3
Runs batted in	(United States) Stan Palys	(Panama) Marlboro Smokers	12
Runs	(United States) Lee Tate	(Panama) Marlboro Smokers	8
Hits	(United States) George Altman	(Cuba) Elefantes de Cienfuegos	7
Hits	(United States) Ed Napoleon	(Panama) Marlboro Smokers	7
Doubles	(United States) Lee Tate	(Panama) Marlboro Smokers	3
Triples	(United States) Willie Davis	(Venezuela) Rapiños de Occidente	2
Stolen bases	Five tied		2
Wins	(Cuba) Camilo Pascual	(Cuba) Elefantes de Cienfuegos	2
Earned run average	(Cuba) Camilo Pascual	(Cuba) Elefantes de Cienfuegos	1.10
Strikeouts	(Puerto Rico) Juan Pizarro	(Puerto Rico) Criollos de Caguas	16

== Awards ==
Tournament Awards
Award	Player	Team
MVP	(Cuba) Camilo Pascual	(Cuba) Elefantes de Cienfuegos
Best manager	(Cuba) Tony Castaño	(Cuba) Elefantes de Cienfuegos

All Star Team
Player	Team	
First base	(Cuba) Rogelio Álvarez	(Cuba) Elefantes de Cienfuegos
Second base	(Puerto Rico) José Pagán	(Puerto Rico) Criollos de Caguas
Third base	(Panama) Héctor López	(Panama) Marlboro Smokers
Shortstop	(United States) Lee Tate	(Panama) Marlboro Smokers
Left field	(United States) Stan Palys	(Panama) Marlboro Smokers
Center field	(United States) Tommy Davis	(Puerto Rico) Criollos de Caguas
Right field	(United States) George Altman	(Cuba) Elefantes de Cienfuegos
Catcher	(United States) Dutch Dotterer	(Cuba) Elefantes de Cienfuegos
Pitcher	(Cuba) Camilo Pascual	(Cuba) Elefantes de Cienfuegos

== See also ==
- Ballplayers who have played in the Series

== Sources ==
- Antero Núñez, José. Series del Caribe. Jefferson, Caracas, Venezuela: Impresos Urbina, C.A., 1987.
- Gutiérrez, Daniel. Enciclopedia del Béisbol en Venezuela – 1895-2006 . Caracas, Venezuela: Impresión Arte, C.A., 2007.
