= Les Layton =

American baseball player (1921-2014)

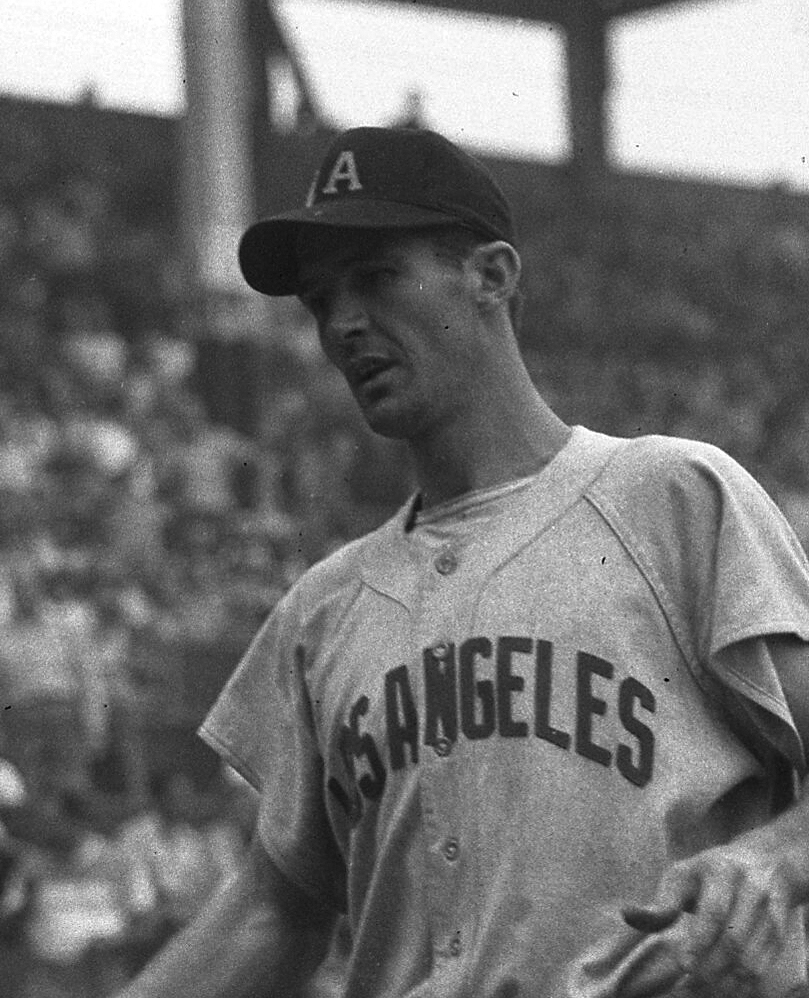
- Layton with the Los Angeles Angels
- Outfielder
- Born: November 18, 1921; Nardin, Oklahoma, United States
- Died: March 1, 2014 (aged 92); Scottsdale, Arizona, United States
- Batted: Right Threw: Right

MLB debut
- April 24, 1948, for the New York Giants

Last MLB appearance
- October 3, 1948, for the New York Giants

MLB statistics
- Batting average: .231
- Home runs: 2
- Runs batted in: 12
- Stats at Baseball Reference

Teams
- New York Giants (1948)
Medals
Representing United States
Global World Series
Gold medal – first place	1955 Milwaukee	Team

Lester Lee Layton (November 18, 1921 – March 1, 2014) was an American professional baseball player. An outfielder whose pro career extended for 11 seasons (1944–1954), he appeared in 63 Major League Baseball games for the 1948 New York Giants.

Layton was born in Nardin, Kay County, Oklahoma, and attended the University of Oklahoma. A right-handed batter and thrower, he stood 6 feet (1.8 m) tall and weighed 165 pounds (75 kg). He signed with the Giants in 1944 and spent his first four seasons with the Jersey City Giants of the top-level International League. After batting .289 with 20 home runs for Jersey City in 1947, Layton made the 1948 varsity Giants' roster. In his first Major League at bat as a pinch hitter May 21 against the Chicago Cubs, Layton homered off Cubs' southpaw Johnny Schmitz. Used primarily as a pinch runner and pinch hitter by managers Mel Ott and Leo Durocher, Layton occasionally spelled corner outfielders Bobby Thomson and Willard Marshall.

He enjoyed his two biggest days as a Major League batsman in the mid-summer of 1948. On July 2, Layton cracked three hits (all singles) in five at bats against the Brooklyn Dodgers — two off Preacher Roe and one off Rex Barney — in a 6–4 Giant win at Ebbets Field. Then, three days later, Layton had a career-high four safeties (including two doubles) off Boston Braves' ace Johnny Sain in a 13-inning, 6–5 New York win at the Polo Grounds.

During his Major League career, Layton collected 21 hits (including four doubles, four triples and two home runs) in 91 at bats. He returned to minor league baseball in 1949 and played six more seasons, including two productive years with the Los Angeles Angels of the Pacific Coast League in 1950–1951.

== See also ==
- Home run in first Major League at-bat
