= Cienfuegos (Cuban League baseball club) =

Former Cuban professional baseball team

Information
- League: Cuban League (1878–1961)
- Ballpark: Estadio del Cerro (1946–1961)
- Established: 1926
- Folded: 1961
- Nickname(s): Elefantes (Elephants)
- Caribbean Series championships: 2 (1956, 1960)
- League championships: 5 (1929–30, 1945–46, 1955–56, 1959–60, 1960–61)
- Colors: Black, green and white

Cienfuegos poster with the team's motto

Cienfuegos, also known as Elefantes de Cienfuegos, was a Cuban baseball team that played in the old Cuban League, which existed from 1878 to 1961. Although representing the south coast city of Cienfuegos, the team played their home games in Havana.

Cienfuegos won five Cuban League championships (including in 1960–61, the last season of the league) and two Caribbean Series (in 1956 and 1960).

Though Cienfuegos folded with the abolition of professional baseball on the island in the wake of the Cuban Revolution, its name lives on with the Elefantes de Cienfuegos of the Cuban National Series.

== History ==
Cienfuegos first participated in the Cuban Professional League championship during the 1926–27 season. Cienfuegos did not play in the 1927–28 season, contending again from 1928 to 1929 through 1930–31. After eight long years of absence, Cienfuegos reappeared in the 1939–40 tournament. In the 1949–50 season, the team was renamed as the Elefantes de Cienfuegos (Cienfuegos Elephants). "The pace of the elephant is slow but crushing", exclaimed the slogan of the Cienfuegos franchise that contended until the 1960–61 season. Following the 1959 Cuban Revolution, political tensions rose with the Fidel Castro government. In March 1961, one month after the regular season ended, the new Cuban regime decreed the abolition of professional baseball in Cuba.

In 26 Championships in which Cienfuegos participated, the team won five league titles in 1929–30, 1945–46, 1955–56, 1959–60 and 1960–61, finishing second 6 times, third 7 times, and fourth 8 times, posting a 732–793 record for a .480 average. Cienfuegos also won the Caribbean Series in 1956 and 1960.

== Caribbean Series record ==
Year	Venue	Finish	Wins	Losses	Win%	Manager
1956	Panama City	1st	5	1	.833	(Cuba) Oscar Rodríguez
1960	Panama City	1st	6	0	1.000	(Cuba) Tony Castaño

== Notable players ==
- (United States) George Altman
- (Cuba) José Azcue
- (United States) Gene Bearden
- (United States) Cool Papa Bell
- (United States) Bob Boyd
- (Cuba) Leo Cárdenas
- (Cuba) Sandy Consuegra
- (Cuba) Martín Dihigo
- (Cuba) Chico Fernández
- (Cuba) Tony González
- (Cuba) Adolfo Luque
- (United States) Sal Maglie
- (United States) Seth Morehead
- (Cuba) Ray Noble
- (Cuba) Alejandro Oms
- (Cuba) Camilo Pascual
- (Cuba) Pedro Ramos
- (United States) Curt Roberts
- (Cuba) Cookie Rojas
- (Cuba) Napoleón Reyes
- (United States) Willie Wells
- (United States) Don Zimmer
