= Dan Dobbek =

American baseball player (1934–2023)

- Outfielder
- Born: December 6, 1934; Ontonagon, Michigan, U.S.
- Died: November 28, 2023 (aged 88); Portland, Oregon, U.S.
- Batted: Left Threw: Right

MLB debut
- September 9, 1959, for the Washington Senators

Last MLB appearance
- October 1, 1961, for the Minnesota Twins

MLB statistics
- Batting average: .208
- Home runs: 15
- Runs batted in: 49
- Stats at Baseball Reference

Teams
- Washington Senators / Minnesota Twins (1959–1961)

Daniel John Dobbek (December 6, 1934 – November 28, 2023) was an American professional baseball player.

== Biography ==
Dobbek attended Western Michigan University and signed with Washington in 1955. He threw right-handed, batted left-handed, and was listed at 6 feet (1.83 m) and 195 pounds (88 kg). His first professional season, with the 1956 Hobbs Sports of the Class B Southwestern League, was his finest: he batted .340 with 23 home runs in 129 games. He then missed the 1957–58 seasons due to military service. After hitting 23 home runs in the Southern Association, he was recalled from the Double-A Chattanooga Lookouts in September 1959.

An outfielder, he played one full season and parts of two others for the Washington Senators / Minnesota Twins franchise of Major League Baseball; his only full major league campaign was in 1960, as a member of the last edition of the 1901–1960 Washington Senators franchise that moved to the Twin Cities for 1961. Dobbek appeared in 110 games for that team, including 58 in center field, batting .218 in 288 at bats with 10 home runs and 30 runs batted in.

But while Dobbek showed some power during his major league service, he batted only .208 in 198 games and 433 at bats, including a lowly .168 for the Twins in their 1961 debut season in Minnesota. He spent part of that season with the Twins' Triple-A Syracuse Chiefs affiliate, then was traded in a waiver deal to the Cincinnati Reds for catcher Jerry Zimmerman in January 1962.

Dobbek spent the remainder of his playing career in the minors, retiring after the 1963 season. Dobbek also played for the Elefantes de Cienfuegos of the Cuban Winter League and was a member of the 1960 Caribbean Series champion team.

Dobbek died of congestive heart failure and complications of dementia on November 28, 2023, at the age of 88.
