= Jackie McLeod =

Canadian ice hockey player and coach (1930–2022)

- McLeod in the 1960–61 season
- Born: April 30, 1930 Regina, Saskatchewan, Canada
- Died: December 8, 2022 (aged 92) Saskatoon, Saskatchewan, Canada
- Height: 5 ft 9 in (175 cm)
- Weight: 165 lb (75 kg; 11 st 11 lb)
- Position: Right wing
- Shot: Right
- Played for: New York Rangers
- National team: Canada
- Playing career: 1949–1965

Robert John McLeod (April 30, 1930 – December 8, 2022) was a Canadian athlete, ice hockey player and coach. He played parts of six professional seasons for the New York Rangers, and eight seasons of senior hockey when he competed at multiple Ice Hockey World Championships and won a gold medal in 1961. He was head coach of the Canada men's national ice hockey team from 1966 to 1969, winning two bronze medals at the World Championships and a bronze medal at the 1968 Winter Olympics. He also coached the Canada men's national junior team to a silver medal at the 1975 World Junior Championships, and the Saskatoon Blades of the Western Canada Hockey League. He also played baseball in the Western Canada League, was inducted into the Saskatchewan Sports Hall of Fame in 1984, and inducted as a player into the IIHF Hall of Fame in 1999.

== Hockey career ==
Robert John McLeod was born on April 30, 1930, in Regina, Saskatchewan. He played ice hockey as a right winger, had a right-handed shot, and was 5 feet 9 inches (1.75 m) and 165 pounds (75 kg).

He began his junior hockey career with the Notre Dame Hounds, coached by Athol Murray. Playing with the Moose Jaw Canucks, he won a Western Canada Junior Hockey League championship during the 1948–49 season. He began the 1949–50 season playing for the Moose Jaw Canucks, then finished the year with the New York Rangers in the National Hockey League (NHL). He made his professional debut at age 19, on December 4, 1949, in a 4–0 victory versus the Chicago Black Hawks. He played portions of the next five seasons in the NHL and the minor leagues, and completed his NHL career in 1955, with 106 games played, 14 goals and 23 assists scored. In the minor leagues, McLeod played the 1951–52 season for the Cincinnati Mohawks in the American Hockey League, followed by eight seasons in the Western Hockey League. He played portions of five seasons for the Saskatoon Quakers, portions of three seasons for the Vancouver Canucks, and one season for the Calgary Stampeders.

McLeod retired from playing professional hockey in 1960, then spent the 1960–61 season playing senior hockey for the Trail Smoke Eaters in the Western International Hockey League. The Smoke Eaters represented the Canada men's national team, and won gold at the 1961 World Championships. McLeod scored two goals and one assist in a 5–1 victory versus the Soviet Union men's national team, which determined first place on the final day of the championships.

During the 1961–62 season, McLeod served as player-coach of the Moose Jaw Pla-Mors in the Saskatchewan Senior Hockey League. At the end of the season, he was added to the Galt Terriers who represented Canada at the 1962 World Championships and won a silver medal, after losing to the Sweden men's national team in the final game. He played for the Saskatoon Quakers for the 1962–63 season, and was added to the Trail Smoke Eaters for the 1963 World Championships, and placed fourth. He then returned to the Saskatoon Quakers, where he played the 1963–64 season.

McLeod played the 1964–65 season with the Moose Jaw Pla-Mors, while also coaching the Moose Jaw Canucks in the Saskatchewan Junior Hockey League. In 1966, Father David Bauer recruited McLeod to become coach of the Canada men's national team permanently, since they had a similar coaching style of being good listeners to players.

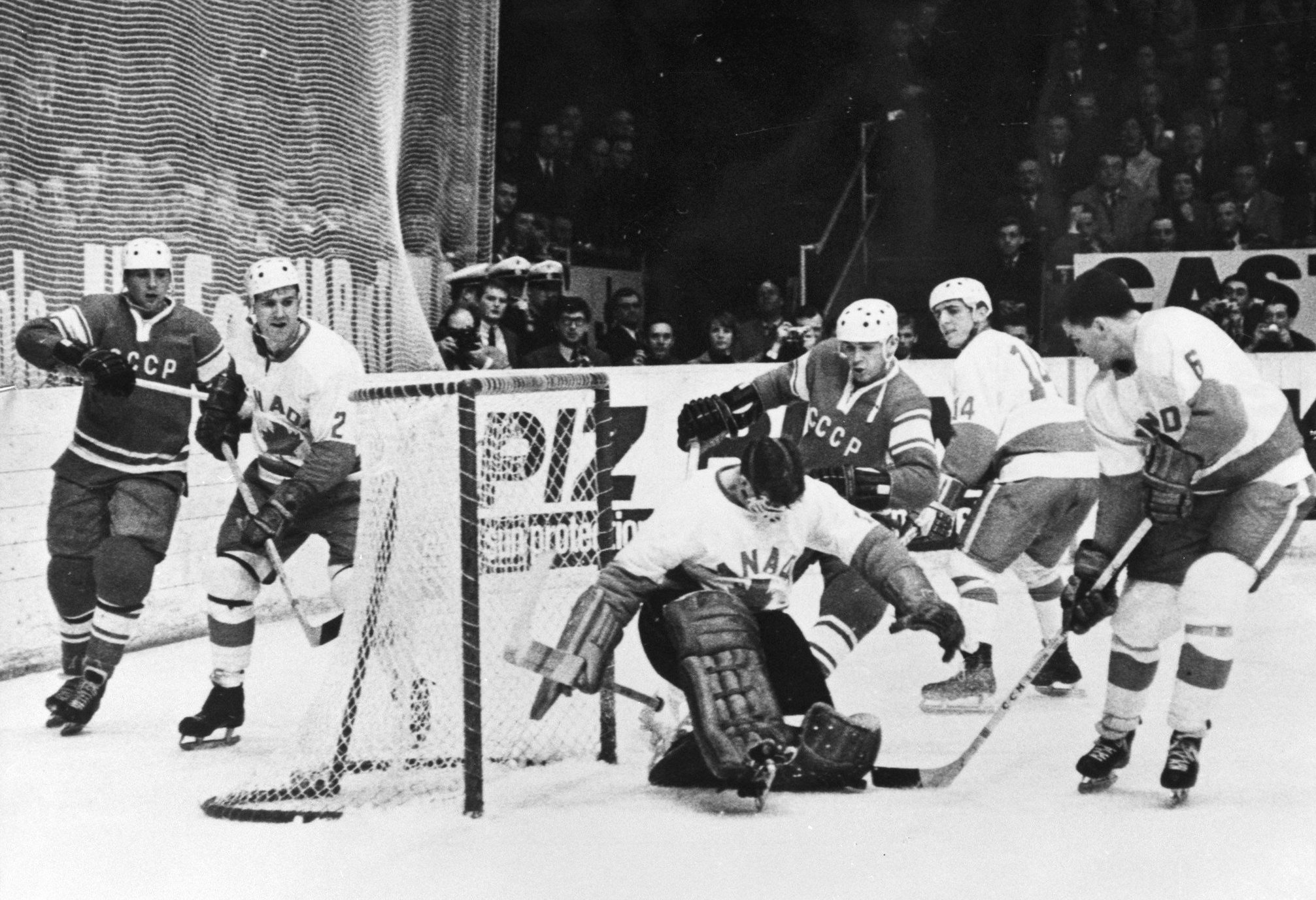
Canada versus the Soviet Union at the 1967 Ice Hockey World Championships

At the 1966 World Championships, McLeod led Canada as a player-coach to a third-place finish and a bronze medal. He later coached Canada to a bronze medal at the 1967 World Championships, a bronze medal at the 1968 Winter Olympics, and a fourth-place finish at the 1969 World Championships. The Canada men's national team was disbanded when Canada withdrew from international men's competition in 1970.

McLeod coached the Saskatoon Blades in the Western Canada Hockey League from 1971 to 1979, and reached the league finals in the 1972–73, 1974–75, and 1975–76 seasons. He also served as general manager of the team and was a part-owner from 1976 to 1980. He also coached the Canada men's national junior team to a silver medal at the 1975 World Junior Championships, held in Canada and the United States.

== Baseball career ==
Jackie McLeod
Medals
Representing Canada
Global World Series
Bronze medal – third place	1955 Milwaukee	Team

McLeod was also an amateur baseball player, playing with the Saskatoon Gems of the Western Canada League. The Gems made up the core of the Canada national baseball team at the 1955 Global World Series, one of the first international baseball tournaments held in North America, where Canada took third place. McLeod was inducted into the Saskatchewan Baseball Hall of Fame in 1989.

== Honours and awards ==
McLeod was inducted into the BC Sports Hall of Fame in 1976, as a team member of the 1960–61 Trail Smoke Eaters. He was inducted into the Saskatchewan Sports Hall of Fame in 1984, inducted as a player into the IIHF Hall of Fame in 1999, and inducted into the Saskatchewan Hockey Hall of Fame in 2015. The Saskatoon Blades recognize McLeod as a team builder, with a banner for him hanging above the rink inside the SaskTel Centre. He also received the Western Hockey League Governors Award in the 2005–06 season.

== Personal life ==
McLeod was a recreational pilot and had a twin sister. He was married to Beverly Evans McLeod and had a son and daughter.

McLeod died on December 8, 2022, at St. Paul's Hospital in Saskatoon, Saskatchewan, at age 92. Former national team player Morris Mott remembered McLeod by writing, "He was a great teammate and coach on the national hockey team. A great goal scorer despite his low velocity shot."

== Career statistics ==
=== Regular season and playoffs ===
			Regular season					Playoffs
Season	Team	League	GP	G	A	Pts	PIM	GP	G	A	Pts	PIM
1946–47	Notre Dame Hounds	SK U18	24	8	9	17	10	—	—	—	—	—
1947–48	Moose Jaw Canucks	SJHL	13	5	12	17	4	5	11	5	16	4
1947–48	Moose Jaw Canucks	M-Cup	—	—	—	—	—	6	4	3	7	4
1948–49	Moose Jaw Canucks	WCJHL	26	19	20	39	25	7	4	2	6	10
1949–50	New York Rangers	NHL	38	6	9	15	2	7	0	0	0	0
1950–51	New York Rangers	NHL	41	5	10	15	2	—	—	—	—	—
1951–52	New York Rangers	NHL	13	2	3	5	2	—	—	—	—	—
1951–52	Cincinnati Mohawks	AHL	49	14	18	32	38	2	0	1	1	2
1952–53	New York Rangers	NHL	3	0	0	0	2	—	—	—	—	—
1952–53	Saskatoon Quakers	WHL	55	30	47	77	28	13	8	11	19	19
1953–54	Saskatoon Quakers	WHL	69	33	38	71	46	6	4	1	5	4
1954–55	New York Rangers	NHL	11	1	1	2	2	—	—	—	—	—
1954–55	Saskatoon Quakers	WHL	51	20	31	51	44	5	2	1	3	14
1955–56	Saskatoon Quakers	WHL	70	34	49	83	97	3	1	1	2	14
1956–57	Vancouver Canucks	WHL	41	30	19	49	30	—	—	—	—	—
1957–58	Vancouver Canucks	WHL	68	44	27	71	45	9	14	4	18	8
1958–59	Saskatoon Quakers	WHL	63	27	26	53	44	—	—	—	—	—
1959–60	Calgary Stampeders	WHL	62	28	28	56	50	—	—	—	—	—
1960–61	Moose Jaw Pla-Mors	SSHL	12	6	6	12	6	—	—	—	—	—
1960–61	Trail Smoke Eaters	WIHL	—	—	—	—	—	—	—	—	—	—
1960–61	Canadian National Team	Intl	19	14	13	27	21	—	—	—	—	—
1960–61	Moose Jaw Pla-Mors	Al-Cup	—	—	—	—	—	4	1	2	3	2
1961–62	Moose Jaw Pla-Mors	SSHL	29	27	25	52	36	—	—	—	—	—
1962–63	Saskatoon Quakers	SSHL	31	37	51	88	22	1	0	0	0	2
1963–64	Saskatoon Quakers	SSHL	40	52	52	104	22	11	7	8	15	6
1963–64	Saskatoon Quakers	Al-Cup	—	—	—	—	—	9	5	13	18	6
1964–65	Moose Jaw Canucks	SSHL	2	3	4	7	12	10	12	12	24	10
1965–66	Canadian National Team	Intl	—	—	—	—	—	—	—	—	—	—
WHL totals			479	246	265	511	384	36	29	18	47	59
NHL totals			106	14	23	37	10	7	0	0	0	0

=== International ===
Year	Team	Event	GP	G	A	Pts	PIM
1961	Canada	WC	7	10	4	14	6
1962	Canada	WC	7	11	6	17	10
1963	Canada	WC	7	5	8	13	6
1966	Canada	WC	7	4	2	6	4
Senior totals			28	30	20	50	26

== Coaching statistics ==
Coaching statistics in junior hockey:

Season	Team	League	Games	Won	Lost	Tied	Win %	Standing	Playoffs
1964–65	Moose Jaw Canucks	SJHL	56	19	34	3	0.366	7th in league	did not qualify
1971–72	Saskatoon Blades	WCHL	68	37	28	3	0.566	2nd in East division	lost in first round
1973–74	Saskatoon Blades	WCHL	68	30	29	9	0.507	4th in East division	lost in first round
1974–75	Saskatoon Blades	WCHL	70	38	22	10	0.614	1st in East division	lost in finals
1975–76	Saskatoon Blades	WCHL	72	43	19	10	0.667	1st in East division	lost in finals
1976–77	Saskatoon Blades	WCHL	72	30	30	12	0.500	2nd in East division	lost in first round
1977–78	Saskatoon Blades	WCHL	72	20	50	2	0.292	4th in East division	did not qualify
1978–79	Saskatoon Blades	WHL	72	26	32	14	0.458	2nd in East division	lost in second round
WCHL/WHL totals			550	243	244	63	0.499		
