= 1955 Global World Series =

International baseball competition held in Milwaukee, Wisconsin

Tournament details
- Teams: 8
- Defending champions: Colombia

Final positions
- Champions: United States
- Runners-up: Hawaii
- Third place: Canada
- Fourth place: Colombia

Awards
- MVP: (United States) Daryl Spencer

The 1955 Global World Series was the first Global World Series, an international baseball tournament organized by the International Baseball Congress in the mid-1950s. It was held in Milwaukee from September 23 to 28, 1955, and was the first worldwide baseball tournament hosted in the United States.

== Background ==
At the time, the Amateur World Series (AWS), the internationally sanctioned baseball world championship, was on hiatus; it was last held in 1953, and would not be held again until 1961 Amateur World Series. The AWS did not allow professional baseball players, excluding players active with Major League Baseball and its affiliates; on top of that, the United States had not participated in the AWS since 1942.

Thus, the Global World Series emerged as an alternative tournament, organized by the semi-professional National Baseball Congress (NBC). NBC president Ray Dumont had begun discussing an international tournament that would feature multiple semipro teams from across the globe as early as 1948, supported by J. G. Taylor Spink, publisher of The Sporting News, and Alejandro Aguilar Reyes, founder and then-commissioner of the Mexican League. These efforts were spearheaded by former MLB Commissioner Happy Chandler, in his role as head of the International Baseball Congress. Chandler in particular sought to expand and existing two-nation series (most recently played between the United States and Japan) to a series involving four nations, or perhaps eight, in 1954.

Despite the success of the two series in Japan, Chandler felt that, in order to increase the number and scope of the teams in the tournament, an American city would have to host. The organizers initially looked at Ebbets Field in New York City, put forth by Brooklyn Dodgers president Walter O'Malley, but Chandler instead selected Milwaukee County Stadium, the new home of the Milwaukee Braves. Chandler and Dumont initially sought to host the first Global World Series in 1954, but plans fell through and it was instead held in 1955.

== Participants ==
Some national teams were made up of their country's professional or semi-pro club champions, including the United States, represented by the Boeing Bombers of Wichita, Kansas. Aside from Daryl Spencer and Les Layton, both former New York Giants players, the team was made up of Boeing factory workers with minor league baseball experience. Canada was represented by the Saskatoon Gems, which included Canadian hockey international Jackie McLeod. Mexico was represented by a club from the Poza Rica League, and Hawaii by the Honolulu Red Sox. (Note: Buege identifies the Mexican team as the "Refinerias de Poza Rica." This was possibly the same club as the Petroleros de Poza Rica that won the Liga Invernal Veracruzana in 1954–55.)

The other national teams were true all-star selections. Puerto Rico included Luis Olmo, a former Major League outfielder and scout who had most recently played with the Cangrejeros de Santurce in the 1954–55 season. The Spanish national team classified by virtue of winning the 1955 European Baseball Championship. Spain's participation was a coup for the tournament's organizers, as the rival International Baseball Federation had not yet been able to involve European countries in the Amateur World Series.

== Venue ==
Milwaukee, Wisconsin	1955 Global World Series is located in Wisconsin
Milwaukee County Stadium	1955 Global World Series is located in Wisconsin
Capacity: 15,000	1955 Global World Series is located in Wisconsin

== Final standings ==
Rk	Team	W	L	
1	United States	5	1	Gold medal
2	Hawaii	4	2	Silver medal
Third place game
3	Canada	3	2	Bronze medal
Eliminated after four games
4	Colombia	2	3	
Eliminated after three games
5	Mexico	1	2	
6	Japan	1	2	
Eliminated after two games
7	Puerto Rico	0	2	
8	Spain	0	2	

== Honors and awards ==
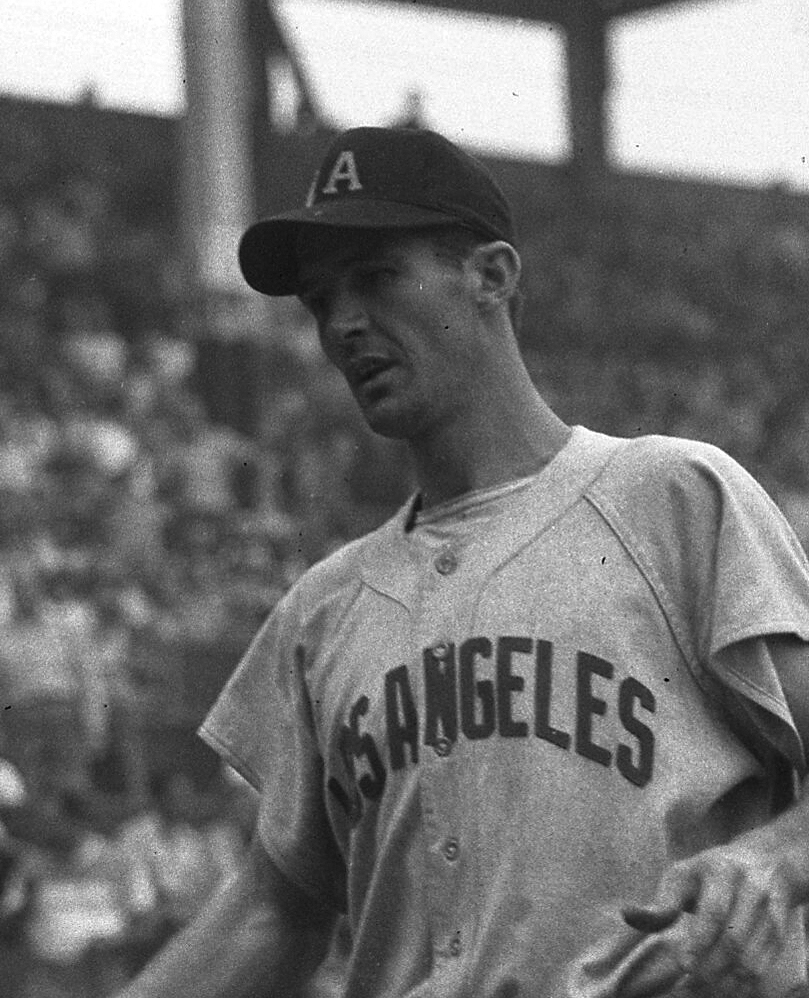
Les Layton was named the tournament's outstanding outfielder

=== Awards ===
Award	Player	Ref.
Most Valuable Player	(United States) Daryl Spencer	
Most Outstanding Outfielder	(United States) Les Layton	
Most Outstanding Infielder	(Mexico) Miguel Fernández	

=== All-Star team ===
Position	Name
Catchers	(United States) Dud Carson
Catchers	(Hawaii) Sol Kaulukukui
Infielders	(Hawaii) Shin Yogi
Infielders	(United States) Daryl Spencer
Infielders	(Mexico) Miguel Fernández
Infielders	(Canada) Jim Ryan
Infielders	(Canada) Cliff Pemberton
Infielders	(United States) Jim Mitchell
Infielders	(Hawaii) Taune Watanabe
Outfielders	(Hawaii) Jack Ladra
Outfielders	(United States) Les Layton
Outfielders	(Mexico) Juan Gallarza
Outfielders	(Japan) Soichi Arakawa
Outfielders	(Hawaii) Ernie Cabral
Pitchers	(Hawaii) Len Kasparovitch
Pitchers	(United States) Vern Frantz
Pitchers	(Colombia) Enrique Hernandez
Pitchers	(Japan) Sadao Kawaii
Pitchers	(United States) Jim Morris
Manager	(United States) Cy Eppler

== See also ==
- 1955 World Series
- 1953 Amateur World Series
