= John Kennedy (shortstop) =

American baseball player (1926-1998)

- Shortstop
- Born: October 12, 1926; Jacksonville, Florida, U.S.
- Died: April 27, 1998 (aged 71); Jacksonville, Florida, U.S.
- Batted: Right Threw: Right

MLB debut
- April 22, 1957, for the Philadelphia Phillies

Last MLB appearance
- May 3, 1957, for the Philadelphia Phillies

MLB statistics
- Batting average: .000
- Home runs: 0
- Runs batted in: 0
- Stats at Baseball Reference

Teams
- Philadelphia Phillies (1957)
Medals
Representing United States
Global World Series
Gold medal – first place	1956 Milwaukee	Team

John Irvin Kennedy (October 12, 1926 – April 27, 1998) was an American professional baseball shortstop. Kennedy was the first African-American player to be signed by and play for the Philadelphia Phillies, the last National League baseball team to support anti-Black segregation. The Phillies had fielded all-White teams through the 1956 season.

== Career ==
Kennedy signed as a free agent with the New York Giants in Major League Baseball (MLB) before the 1953 season, but was released prior to the 1954 season. Kennedy caught on with the Birmingham Black Barons, and later the Kansas City Monarchs, both of the Negro American League. Near the end of the 1956 season, with Kennedy having led the NAL batting race for most of the year, the Monarchs sold his contract to the Philadelphia Phillies.

Kennedy hit over .300 during the Phillies 1957 spring training's exhibition games. The team initially assigned him to their Schenectady minor league affiliate but without a starting shortstop for opening day, Phillies manager Mayo Smith told reporters on March 25, 1957, that "...if the season opened tomorrow, [Kennedy] would be my shortstop." Phillies general manager Roy Hamey told reporters the shortstop job was Kennedy’s. However the Phillies acquired Chico Fernández from the Dodgers before opening day, and named Fernández the starting shortstop.

When Kennedy made his big league debut (April 22, 1957, at Roosevelt Stadium), he became the first black player in Phillies history. The game was exactly ten years to the day after then-Phillies manager Ben Chapman led his players in anti-Black verbal attacks on rookie Jackie Robinson at Brooklyn. Playing against the Brooklyn Dodgers, Kennedy entered the game in the top of the eighth inning as a pinch runner for Solly Hemus, who had doubled, but he did not score. The Dodgers won, 5-1.

Kennedy's next game was two days later, playing against the Pittsburgh Pirates at Connie Mack Stadium. He entered the game in the bottom of the sixth as a pinch runner for Harry Anderson, who had singled, and later scored on a bases-loaded triple by Ed Bouchee. The Phillies won, 8-5.

Kennedy got into a total of just five games, the last one on May 3, 1957. At the plate, he was 0-for-2, including one strikeout. In his two appearances at shortstop he had one assist, one error, and participated in one double play.

Kennedy played amateur baseball through his 50s and 60s in a men’s 30-and-over baseball league in Jacksonville, Florida. A granite marker was placed on Kennedy’s unmarked grave in Jacksonville in 2008. The Philadelphia Phillies recognized Kennedy's role in the history of the organization in a pre-game ceremony on June 29, 2022.

== See also ==
- List of first black Major League Baseball players by team and date
