= Hawaii national baseball team =

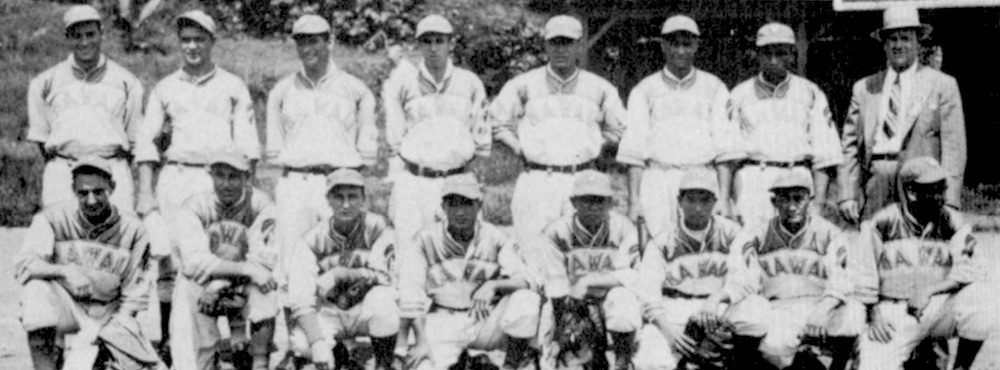
- Hawaii at the 1940 Amateur World Series

Information
- Country: Hawaii
- Federation: International Baseball Federation; International Baseball Congress

World Cup
- Appearances: 1 (first in 1940)
- Best result: 5th (1940)

The Hawaii national baseball team was the national baseball team of the Territory of Hawaii. It represented the territory in international competitions before Hawaii was granted statehood in 1959; Hawaii now competes as part of the United States national team.

Hawaii competed in the third edition of the Amateur World Series in 1940, where it finished fifth.

Hawaii also participated in the 1940 East Asian Games, held in Tokyo as a substitute for the canceled 1940 Summer Olympics. The territory was represented by the Hawaii Asahis amateur team. It lost all three of its games to Japan (4–3), the Philippines (4–2), and Manchukuo (1–0).

Hawaii was represented by the Honolulu Red Sox at the 1955 and 1956 editions of the Global World Series, organized by the National Baseball Congress. However, at the 1957 installment of the tournament, the territory was represented by a selection of Hawaiian all-stars.

== Competitive Record ==
=== Amateur World Series ===
Amateur World Series & Baseball World Cup record
Year	Result	Position	Pld	W	L	%	RS	RA	Org.
(United Kingdom) 1938	Did not enter								IBF
(Cuba) 1939	Did not enter								IBF
(Cuba) 1940	Single-table tournament	5th	12	5	7	.417	51	49	IBF
(Cuba) 1941	Did not enter								IBF
(Cuba) 1942	Did not enter								IBF
(Cuba) 1943	Did not enter								IBF
(Venezuela) 1944	Did not enter								FIBA
(Venezuela) 1945	Did not enter								FIBA
(Colombia) 1947	Did not enter								FIBA
(Nicaragua) 1948	Did not enter								FIBA
(Nicaragua) 1950	Did not enter								FIBA
(Mexico) 1951	Did not enter								FIBA
(Cuba) 1952	Did not enter								FIBA
(Venezuela) 1953	Did not enter								FIBA
Total	0 Titles	1/14	12	5	7	.417	51	49	

=== East Asian Games ===
- 1940 : 4th

=== Global World Series ===
- 1955 : (silver) 2nd
- 1956 : (silver) 2nd
- 1957 : 5th

== Notable players ==
- Herb North
- John Sardinha
