= 1961 Amateur World Series =

Tournament details
- Country: Costa Rica
- Teams: 10

Final positions
- Champions: Cuba
- Runners-up: Mexico
- Third place: Venezuela
- Fourth place: Panama

The 1961 Amateur World Series was the 15th edition of the Amateur World Series of international baseball.It was the only one held in Costa Rica, taking place in San Jose from April 7 through April 21, 1961.

The 1961 tournament was the first Amateur World Series to be held since the 1953 edition, and the first major baseball tournament since the 1957 Global World Series in Detroit. It was also the first international tournament to feature a Cuban entry since the Cuban revolution. Coincidentally, the tournament was ongoing while anti-Castro Cuban exiles, supported by the United States, stormed the Bay of Pigs.

== Participants ==
Ten countries participated in the 1961 Amateur World Series. They were divided into two qualifying groups; the three teams with the best record in each group moved on to the final round.

The tryouts for the Cuban national team were held simultaneously to the establishment of INDER and the replacement of professional sports with amateurism in Cuba, including the abolition of the professional Cuban Winter League. Clemente Carreras was the manager for Cuba; he had previously skippered the national team in the 1952 Amateur World Series.

Venezuela, fresh off a gold medal run at the 1959 Pan American Games were considered the favorites at the tournament. The team was mainly composed of players from the Intendencia Naval amateur club, managed by José Manuel Tovar. The Netherlands Antilles were piloted by former Cuban Leaguer Agapito Mayor.

== Tournament summary ==
In group play, Panama advanced out of Group A with a 4-0 record, followed by Venezuela (3-1) and the hosts, Costa Rica (2-2).

In Group B, Cuba (4-0) and Mexico (3-1) qualified for the final round easily. Cuba defeated the Dutch Antilles 18–0, Nicaragua 16–0, Guatemala 25–0, and Mexico 11–1. However, Guatemala, Nicaragua and the Netherlands Antilles all tied with a record of 1-3, playing an extra series to decide who would advance to the final round; Guatemala defeated Nicaragua 6-5 and the Netherlands Antilles 8-1 to qualify for the final.

In the decisive stage, Cuba again went undefeated, besting Panama (12–3), Guatemala (13–2), Mexico (13–1), Costa Rica (12–2), and Venezuela (9–3). Mexico and Venezuela took the podium spots, with a record of 4-1 and 3-2 respectively. Cuba was carried by pitchers Alfredo Street (3-0) and Jose M. Pineda (2-0); Pineda allowed only one run and one walk in 18 innings of play, striking out 27 batters.

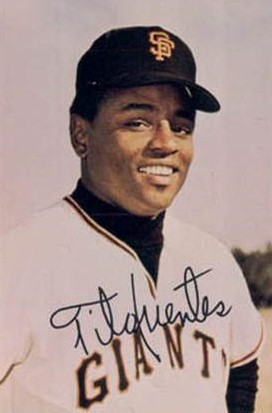
Tito Fuentes of the Cuban national team ultimately signed with the San Francisco Giants

Several Cuban players attracted the attention of major league scouts. Three of them, Bert Campaneris, Tito Fuentes, and José Miguel Pineda, signed major league contracts; Campaneris and Fuentes went on to have long major league careers, while Pineda ultimately chose to remain in Cuba.

== Final standings ==
Pos.	Team	W	L
1st place, gold medalist(s)	Cuba	9	0
2nd place, silver medalist(s)	Mexico	7	2
3rd place, bronze medalist(s)	Venezuela	6	3
4	Panama	6	3
5	Costa Rica	4	5
6	Guatemala	1	8
7	Honduras	1	3
8	Netherlands Antilles	1	3
9	Nicaragua	1	3
10	El Salvador	0	4

== Statistical leaders ==
Batting leaders
Statistic	Name	Total
Batting average	(Cuba) Mario González	.500
Hits	(Cuba) José Fernández	17
Hits	(Cuba) Pedro Chávez	17
Runs	(Cuba) José Fernández	20
Home runs	(Panama) Williams Proutt	6
Runs batted in	(Cuba) Pedro Chávez	19
Stolen bases	(Cuba) José Fernández	5

Pitching leaders
Statistic	Name	Total
Wins	(Mexico) Luis García	5
Earned run average	(Cuba) José M. Pineda	0.50
