= Milwaukee County Stadium =

Former stadium in Milwaukee, Wisconsin

- County Stadium
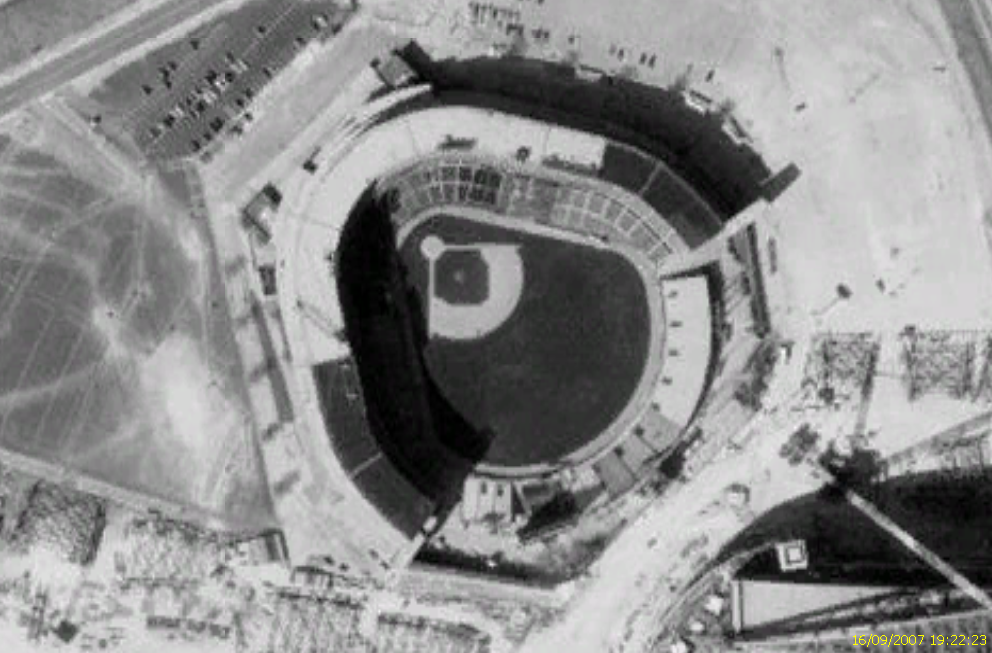
- Aerial view of Milwaukee County Stadium in 2000 with Miller Park, now American Family Field, under construction in the lower right
- Interactive map of Milwaukee County Stadium
- Location: 201 South 46th Street; Milwaukee, Wisconsin, U.S.
- Coordinates: 43.030°N 87.974°W
- Owner: Milwaukee County
- Capacity: 36,011 (1953); 44,091 (1954–1955); 43,117 (1956); 43,768 (1957–1969); 45,768 (1970–1972); 46,000 (1973–1974); 47,500 (1975–1976); 52,293 (1977–1978); 54,187 (1979–1980); 53,192 (1981–2000)
- Surface: Natural grass
- Field size: Left Line – 315 ft (96 m); Left Field – 362 ft (110 m); Deep L.C. – 392 ft (119 m); Center F. – 402 ft (123 m); Deep R.C. – 392 ft (119 m); Right Field – 362 ft (110 m); Right Line – 315 ft (96 m); Backstop – 60 ft (18 m)

Construction
- Groundbreaking: October 19, 1950
- Opened: April 6, 1953; 73 years ago
- Closed: September 28, 2000
- Demolished: February 21, 2001
- Cost: $5.9 million ($71 million in 2025 dollars)
- Architect: Osborn Engineering
- General contractor: Hunzinger Construction

Tenants
- Milwaukee Braves (MLB) (1953–1965); Green Bay Packers (NFL) (1953–1994, part time); Marquette Golden Avalanche (NCAA) (1957–1958); Chicago White Sox (MLB) (1968–1969, part-time); Milwaukee Panthers (NCAA) (1968–1971); Milwaukee Brewers (MLB) (1970–2000)

Milwaukee County Stadium was a multi-purpose stadium in Milwaukee, Wisconsin. Opened in 1953, it was primarily a baseball park for Major League Baseball's Milwaukee Braves and later the Milwaukee Brewers. It was also used for Green Bay Packers football games, ice skating, religious services, concerts, and other large events. Its final season was in 2000, when it was replaced by the adjacent Miller Park, now American Family Field.

== Construction ==
Milwaukee County Stadium was originally built as a home for the Milwaukee Brewers of the minor league American Association, replacing the outdated and deteriorating Borchert Field. Both locations would be influenced by the future Milwaukee County freeway system, as Borchert Field's footprint would be cleared to make way for Interstate 43, with County Stadium located southwest of the interchange with the Stadium Freeway and Interstate 94.

Several locations around the city, including the Wisconsin State Fair Park in West Allis were considered before the city settled on the defunct site of the Story Quarry, on the west side of Milwaukee near the Story Hill neighborhood. County Stadium was the first ballpark in the United States financed with public funds. Construction began in October 1950 and, hampered by steel shortages during the Korean War, was completed in 1953. Construction cost was $5.9 million, with the bonds paid off in 1964.

The city of Milwaukee also hoped to use the new facility to attract a Major League Baseball franchise (the city had been considered a potential relocation target for years), and in this respect their efforts were immediately successful. In fact, the minor league Brewers would never get a chance to play at the new stadium.

When it opened in 1953 it had 28,111 permanent seats and could hold up to 36,011 people. After an expansion one year later, the seating capacity was increased to 43,394. Subsequent expansions raised the baseball capacity to 53,192.

=== Dimensions ===
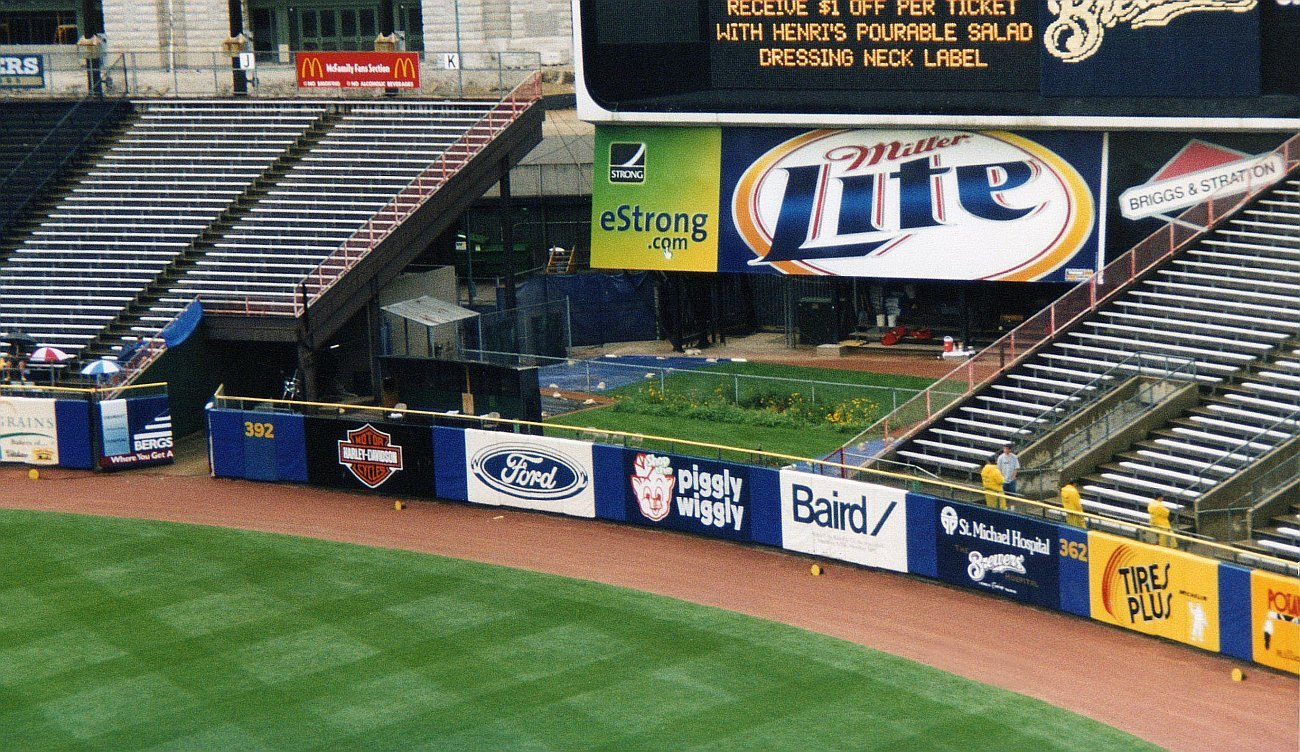
Brewers bullpen

The stadium's final dimensions were symmetrical:

Dimension	Distance	Notes
Left Field line	315 ft (96 m)	
Shallow Left Center	362 ft (110 m)	
True Left Center	382 ft (116 m)	unposted
Deep Left Center	392 ft (119 m)	
Center Field	402 ft (123 m)	
Deep Right Center	392 ft (119 m)	
True Right Center	382 ft (116 m)	unposted
Shallow Right Center	362 ft (110 m)	
Right Field line	315 ft (96 m)	

== Major League Baseball ==
=== Milwaukee Braves (1953–1965) ===
Even before it was completed, the new "Milwaukee County Municipal Stadium" drew the interest of major league clubs. The St. Louis Browns, who had played in Milwaukee in 1901, the inaugural season of the American League, applied for permission to relocate back to the city they had left half a century before. The Boston Braves, the parent club of the Brewers, blocked the proposed move. The Braves had long been struggling at the gate in Boston, and rumors of them relocating had been floating for some time. The move to keep Milwaukee available as a new home indicated to many observers that the Braves would move to Milwaukee themselves.

County Stadium, September 1960

Three weeks before the beginning of the 1953 season, and right before the new stadium was ready to open, the Braves made it official, applying for permission to relocate. The other National League owners agreed, with the team becoming the Milwaukee Braves. The Braves' first regular season home game was on April 14 against the St. Louis Cardinals. Bill Bruton hit a 10th inning home run to win the game (3–2) in dramatic style. In their first season in Milwaukee, the Braves set the National League attendance record of 1.8 million.

The first published issue of Sports Illustrated on August 16, 1954, featured County Stadium with Braves batter Eddie Mathews on its cover, along with New York Giants catcher Wes Westrum and home plate umpire Augie Donatelli.

On July 12, 1955, County Stadium hosted the 22nd All-Star Game. The National League won, 6–5, on a 12th-inning home run by Stan Musial. It hosted the first two editions of the Global World Series, an international baseball tournament, in 1955 and 1956; both editions were won by the United States. The Braves hosted back-to-back World Series in 1957 and 1958, both against the New York Yankees. The Braves defeated the Yankees in seven games in 1957, but the Yankees returned the favor the next year.

The stadium continued to be the National League's top draw until 1959 when the Dodgers, who had moved to Los Angeles two years before, overtook the Braves (both in the stands and on the field). In the early 1960s attendance fell, along with the Braves' standings, amid an unstable ownership situation. The Milwaukee Braves used the stadium through the 1965 season when new owners, seeking a larger television market, moved the team to Atlanta.

=== Chicago White Sox (1968–1969) ===
In an effort to return Major League Baseball to Milwaukee after the departure of the Braves, local businessman and minority Braves owner Bud Selig brought other teams to play at County Stadium, beginning with a 1967 exhibition game between the Chicago White Sox and Minnesota Twins. The exhibition game attracted more than 51,000 spectators, so Selig's group contracted with Sox owner Arthur Allyn to host nine Chicago White Sox home games at County Stadium in 1968.

Selig's experiment was highly successful – those nine games drew 264,297 fans. Those games took place on May 15 vs. the California Angels, May 28 vs. the Baltimore Orioles, June 17 vs. the Cleveland Indians, June 24 vs. the Minnesota Twins, July 11 vs. the New York Yankees, July 22 vs. the Oakland A's, August 2 vs. the Washington Senators, August 8 vs. the Boston Red Sox, and August 26 vs. the eventual World Series winners, the Detroit Tigers. In Chicago that season, the Sox drew 539,478 fans to their remaining 72 home dates. In just a handful of games, the Milwaukee crowds accounted for nearly one-third of the total attendance at White Sox games. In light of this success, Selig and Allyn agreed that County Stadium would host Sox home games again the next season.

In 1969, the Sox schedule in Milwaukee was expanded to include 11 home games (one against every other franchise in the American League at the time). Although those games were attended by slightly fewer fans (198,211 fans, for an average of 18,019) they represented a greater percentage of the total White Sox attendance than the previous year – over one-third of the fans who went to Sox home games in 1969 did so at County Stadium (in the remaining 70 home dates in Chicago, the Sox drew 391,335 for an average of 5,591 per game). Those games took place on April 23 vs. the California Angels, May 22 vs. the Detroit Tigers, May 28 vs. the New York Yankees, June 11 vs. the Cleveland Indians, June 16 vs. the Seattle Pilots (who eventually became the Brewers the next season), July 2 vs. the Minnesota Twins, July 7 vs. the Oakland A's, August 6 vs. the Washington Senators, August 13 vs. the Boston Red Sox, September 1 vs. the Baltimore Orioles, and September 26 vs. the Kansas City Royals.

Selig was unable to attract an expansion team among the franchises awarded for the 1969 expansion. However, one of the teams founded in that expansion would later work in Selig's favor.

=== Milwaukee Brewers (1970–2000) ===
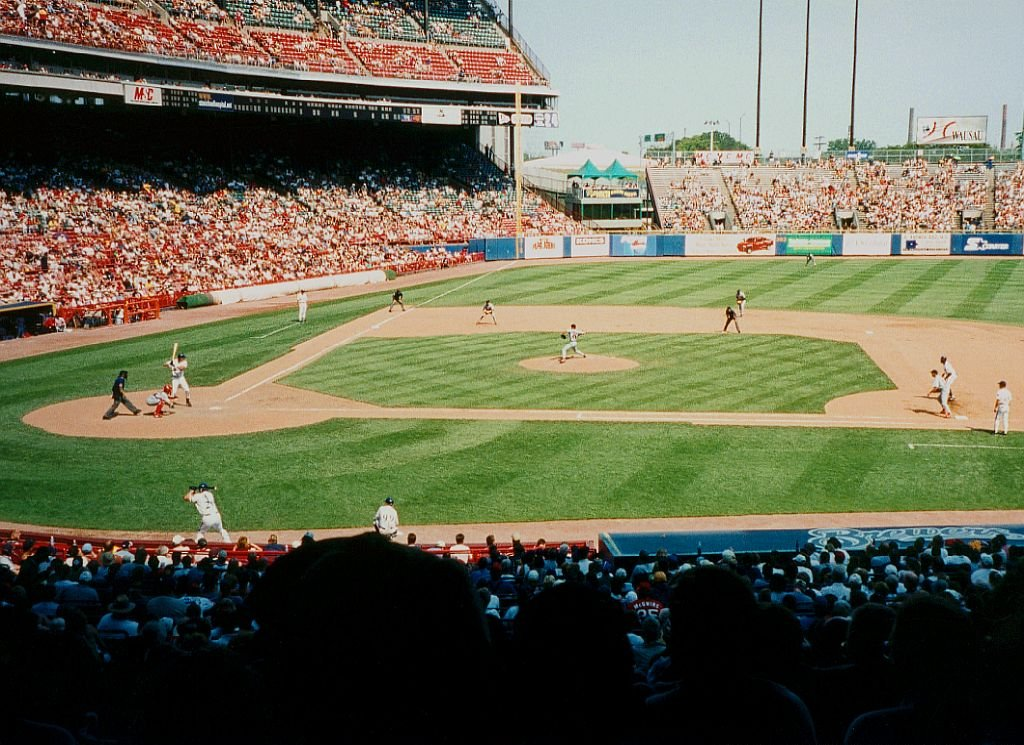
County Stadium in 2000

Not discouraged by the setback, Selig instead bought the troubled Seattle Pilots out of bankruptcy court. The Pilots had been a 1969 expansion team. The Seattle franchise had serious stadium and financial issues. In the spring of 1970, Milwaukee had baseball again, and County Stadium had a new tenant.

The new Milwaukee Brewers, named for the American Association club for which County Stadium was originally built over 20 years earlier, called it home from 1970 to 2000. The sale occurred during spring training for 1970, and happened so fast that Selig could not get new uniforms made. Instead, they ripped the Pilots insignia off the pre-existing uniforms, and the Brewers adopted the Pilots' blue, white, and yellow instead of the red and navy blue (the Braves' colors) that Selig originally wanted; these remain the team colors to this day, despite changes to the shades over the years (and the brief addition of green as a tertiary color from 1994 to 1996).

On July 15, 1975, County Stadium hosted its second All-Star Game. As in 1955, the National League beat the American League, this time 6–3. With an attendance of 51,480, it was the largest crowd at the stadium at that time. The Brewers were represented by George Scott and Hank Aaron, who had recently returned to Milwaukee in a trade with the Braves.

Aaron spent the last two years of his career in Milwaukee and in the American League (where the Brewers played then; they would move to the National League in 1998), where the designated hitter position allowed him to extend his playing career. Aaron hit his final home run at County Stadium, giving him a career total of 755, establishing at the time the career home run record he first took from Babe Ruth in 1974. Aaron's final home run took place in the 7th inning with a solo shot off California Angels right-hander Dick Drago on July 20, 1976, a game that the Brewers would win 6–2.

Before the Kansas City Royals were to play a game on June 12, 1977 against the Milwaukee Brewers at Milwaukee County Stadium, thieves stole gloves and uniforms belonging to Royals players. Due to this, all but seven Royals players had to wear Milwaukee road uniforms for the game played that day.

The Brewers won their first and only American League Championship by defeating the California Angels in five games in 1982, and hosted Games 3, 4 and 5 of the 1982 World Series against the St. Louis Cardinals.

There was a chalet and giant beer mug, originally at right-center field and later at left, where mascot Bernie Brewer would "dunk" himself whenever a Brewers player hit a home run. The chalet is now stored at Lakefront Brewery, a Milwaukee microbrewery, and can be seen on brewery tours. County Stadium also gave rise to the Sausage Race, during which several anthropomorphized sausages participate in an initially fictional race to home plate between the sixth and seventh innings. Whoever finished first was the "wiener" and whoever finished last was the "wurst".

=== Notable games ===
County Stadium has hosted two Baseball All-Star Games, in 1955, when the National League Braves played host (and won 6–5 in 12 innings), and in 1975, when the then American League Brewers played host, and lost, 6–3. It also hosted the World Series in 1957, 1958 and 1982, as well as league playoffs in 1981, and a Green Bay Packers playoff game in 1967.

On May 26, 1959, Harvey Haddix of the Pittsburgh Pirates set a record as he pitched 12 perfect innings only to lose 1–0 to the Braves in the 13th inning.

On April 30, 1961, Willie Mays hit four homers and collected 8 RBI as the San Francisco Giants defeated the Braves, 14–8.

On May 1, 1975, Hank Aaron broke Babe Ruth's RBI record of 2,211 by driving in his 2212th run at County Stadium as the Brewers beat the Detroit Tigers, 17–3.

On October 3, 1976, in the final game of his career, Aaron singled in his final at-bat for hit number 3,771. The hit drove in a run and set the Major League Baseball career RBI record of 2,297. In this final game, Aaron also set Major League records for that time with career game 3,298 and career at-bat 12,364. The Brewers lost to the Detroit Tigers, 5–2.

On October 10, 1982, the Brewers defeated the California Angels to win their first and only American League championship in franchise history. The Brewers defeated the Angels, 4–3, to win the ALCS three games to two.

On July 31, 1990, Nolan Ryan won his 300th Major League Baseball game at County Stadium when the Texas Rangers defeated the Brewers 11–3.

On September 14, 1991, Cecil Fielder of the Detroit Tigers hit the only home run to sail over the outfield bleachers and completely out of County Stadium. The blast came off Brewers' pitcher Dan Plesac. The Tigers beat the Brewers, 6–4.

On September 9, 1992, Robin Yount recorded his 3,000th hit in a Major League Baseball game at County Stadium.

== Football ==
=== Green Bay Packers (1953–1994) ===
The National Football League's Green Bay Packers played two to four home games per year at Milwaukee County Stadium from 1953 to 1994, after using Wisconsin State Fair Park in nearby West Allis from 1934 through 1951 and Marquette Stadium in 1952. The Packers compiled a 76–47–3 (.615) regular season record at County Stadium over 42 seasons. It hosted at least one pre-season game annually during this time as well (except 1983), including the Upper Midwest Shrine Game. Financial considerations prompted the Packers to move some of their games to Milwaukee starting with the 1933 season, with one game played at Borchert Field. By 1995, multiple renovations to Lambeau Field made it more lucrative for the Packers to play their full home slate in Green Bay again for the first time since 1932; according to Packers president Bob Harlan, the overall cost of hosting games at County Stadium was costing the team over $2 million a year. Former Milwaukee ticket holders were offered tickets at Lambeau to one pre-season game and games 3 and 6 of the regular season schedule (later changed to games 2 and 5), in what is referred to as the "Gold package".

County Stadium was partly responsible for Lambeau Field's existence. When it was originally built, it was not only intended to lure an MLB team to Milwaukee, but also to lure the Packers to Milwaukee full-time. As originally constructed, County Stadium was double the size of the Packers' then-home, City Stadium. By the 1950s, the Packers were under growing pressure to find a replacement for City Stadium. It could not be expanded, and its amenities for fans and players had long since fallen below NFL standards. With a growing number of teams letting it be known that they would not play at City Stadium, the NFL told the Packers to build a bigger stadium or move to Milwaukee full-time. Green Bay responded with a referendum that resulted in a new City Stadium, which opened in September 1957. After eight seasons, the venue was renamed "Lambeau Field" shortly after the death of team founder Curly Lambeau in 1965.

The Minnesota Vikings (15 times) were the Packers' most frequent foe at County Stadium, as the Packers would traditionally host at least one divisional rival from the NFC Central in Milwaukee each season. Only once, however, did the Packers play their ancient arch-rivals, the Chicago Bears, in a regular-season game in Milwaukee, defeating the Bears 20–3 in 1974. (The Packers and Bears played preseason games at County Stadium every year from 1959 to 1973, and again in 1975 and 1984; current NFL rules prohibit division rivals from playing each other during the preseason.) On November 26, 1989, a County Stadium record crowd of 55,892 saw the Packers beat the Vikings, 20–19. The Packers' final game at County Stadium was a 21–17 victory over the Atlanta Falcons on December 18, 1994; with fourteen seconds left, the winning 9-yard touchdown run was scored by quarterback Brett Favre, who was drafted by the Falcons in 1991 but traded the next year due to then-Atlanta coach Jerry Glanville's intense dislike of Favre.

The Packers hosted one NFL playoff game at County Stadium, in 1967, defeating the Los Angeles Rams 28–7 in the Western Conference championship game, avenging a 27–24 loss two weeks earlier at the Los Angeles Memorial Coliseum. It was the first year that the NFL playoffs expanded to four teams, and Green Bay had home field advantage for both rounds, then awarded by rotation. Each subsequent playoff game has been played at Lambeau Field, starting with the Ice Bowl the following week against the Dallas Cowboys.

Unlike most publicly funded stadiums built in the 20th century, County Stadium was built primarily for baseball, creating issues for hosting football. The playing surface was just barely large enough to fit a football field, which ran parallel with the first base line. The south end zone spilled onto the warning track in right field, while the north end zone spilled into foul territory on the third-base side. Both teams shared the east sideline on the outfield side, separated by a piece of tape. At its height, it seated less than 56,000 for football—just over the NFL's post-AFL merger minimum seating capacity—and many seats had obstructed views or were far from the field. Over the years, upgrades and seat expansions almost exclusively benefited the Braves and later the Brewers.

Season ticket prices (three games) for the first football season in 1953 were $5.00, $3.80, and $2.50. The average price in the final year of 1994 was $25.61 per game.

==== Attempted AFL franchise ====
Following the unsuccessful effort to lure the Packers to Milwaukee full-time, in 1965 city officials tried to lure an American Football League expansion team to play at County Stadium. However Packers head coach and general manager Vince Lombardi invoked the team's exclusive lease to effectively lock out a potential AFL team from the facility, as well as sign an extension to keep some home games in Milwaukee until 1976. Lombardi even went as far as to veto a proposed 1967 AFL exhibition game at County Stadium. On paper, no other facility in Milwaukee was suitable even as a temporary site. Nonetheless, city officials still pursued an AFL franchise, possibly to play at Marquette Stadium, but the AFL–NFL merger effectively quashed any chances of Milwaukee landing its own team.

==== Attempted CFL franchise ====
In late 1994, Marvin Fishman purchased a stake in the corporation that owned the Las Vegas Posse of the Canadian Football League, with intent of moving the Posse to County Stadium, which would have required compromises in playing dimensions in order to be playable under CFL rules. Initially hoping to be held to the same revenue-sharing plan as the Packers had during their Milwaukee games, the Brewers unexpectedly objected, reasoning that unlike the Packers' two games that were usually outside of baseball season, the CFL played much of its schedule in the summer, meaning that several home games would cause scheduling conflicts with the Brewers and potentially damage the playing surface. Even after Fishman's bid fell through and the Posse shifted its efforts to Jackson, Mississippi, CFL Commissioner Larry Smith continued to support a team for Milwaukee and County Stadium, a proposal that eventually ended after the CFL withdrew from the American market following the 1995 season.

=== Marquette Golden Avalanche (1957–1958) ===
Most of the home games of the Marquette University football team (7 of 9) in 1957 and 1958 were moved from Marquette Stadium to the larger County Stadium. The final home game on November 9, 1957 against Penn State drew less than 4,800 to County Stadium. Marquette football returned to Marquette Stadium in 1959 for its final two seasons.

=== Milwaukee Panthers (1968–1971) ===
The University of Wisconsin–Milwaukee football team played home games at County Stadium 1968–1971. It was one of multiple home venues for the Panthers after their on-campus stadium, Pearse Field, was razed for new development following the 1967 season.

== Other uses ==
=== Concert venue ===
County Stadium was also a popular home for concerts throughout its history. Bob Hope performed for fans during a Braves doubleheader in 1960.

County Stadium also hosted the Kool Jazz Festival every year from 1976 through 1980.

Other musical stars who performed at County Stadium included Simon and Garfunkel, Pink Floyd, Crosby Stills & Nash, Fleetwood Mac, Jimmy Buffett, Kenny Loggins, Peter Frampton, Marvin Gaye, Al Green, The Jacksons, The Temptations, Smokey Robinson, B.B. King, Emmylou Harris, Nancy Wilson, The Staple Singers, Archie Bell and the Drells, Frankie Avalon, the Hollywood Argyles, Johnny and The Hurricanes, James Brown, The Famous Flames, Lobo, Bread, Andy Kim, Gary Puckett, Rare Earth & The Honeycombs.

Date	Artist	Opening act(s)	Tour / Concert name	Attendance	Revenue	Notes
June 8, 1975	The Rolling Stones	Rufus; The Gap Band; Eagles	Tour of the Americas '75	—	—	
June 22, 1975	Pink Floyd	—	Wish You Were Here Tour	54,000	—	
June 15, 1977	Pink Floyd	—	In the Flesh Tour	60,000	—	
September 11, 1977	Fleetwood Mac	Jimmy Buffett	Rumours Tour; Changes in Latitudes, Changes in Attitudes Tour	—	—	
June 30, 1978	Ted Nugent	Heart; Journey; Cheap Trick	Grand Slam Jam	40,000	—	
August 2, 1978	Eagles	The Steve Miller Band; Pablo Cruise; Jefferson Starship	Hotel California Tour	—	—	
June 1, 1979	The Jacksons	War; Peabo Bryson; Tavares; B.B. King	Destiny World Tour	—	—	Part of 1979 Kool Jazz Festival
June 2, 1979	Marvin Gaye	Bar-Kays; Rose Royce; The Manhattans	—	—	—	Part of 1979 Kool Jazz Festival
September 5, 1981	REO Speedwagon; April Wine; Blackfoot; The Michael Stanley Band	—	World Series of Rock	—	—	
May 28, 1982	Foreigner.38 Special; Triumph; Loverboy; Quarterflash	—	World Series of Rock II	40,413 / 60,000	—	
September 30, 1987	Pink Floyd	—	A Momentary Lapse of Reason Tour	58,044 / 60,000	$1,160,880	
June 2, 1993	Paul McCartney	—	The New World Tour	47,013 / 47,013	$1,527,923	
August 11, 1994	Billy Joel; Elton John	—	Face to Face 1994	55,526 / 55,526	$2,480,520	

=== Religious services ===
Jehovah's Witnesses held an annual convention (including well known annual themes such as: "Good News for all Nations" and 'Peace on Earth") in the Stadium during the 1960s and 1970s, drawing as many as 57,000 people at a time. They later opted to utilize an "Assembly Hall", which is constructed for the same purpose as the Stadium.

Billy Graham's 1979 Wisconsin Crusade was also held at the Stadium.

=== Coach (TV series) ===
Portions of the last three seasons (1995–1997) of the American television series Coach were filmed at County Stadium. The series starred Craig T. Nelson as Hayden Fox, coach of the Orlando Breakers (a fictional NFL expansion team), from whose office window County Stadium can be recognized.

=== Movie location ===
Milwaukee County Stadium in the film Major League

The movie Major League was shot at County Stadium during the summer of 1988. Even though the movie was about the Cleveland Indians, producers cast Milwaukee Brewers radio announcer Bob Uecker in the movie, with signage for local channels WTMJ-TV (Channel 4) and WCGV-TV (Channel 24) not covered up and visible in the film. Announcements were made on local television news programs about the number of extras required for the day's shooting, and capacity crowds turned out for the shooting of the final scenes, which involved the Indians in the final games of a pennant race. Also, in the film, fans in the stands are visible donning T-shirts bearing the name and logo of a local Milwaukee-area corporation, Quad Graphics (located in Sussex).

=== International soccer ===
On July 28, 1990, the United States men's national soccer team hosted an international friendly vs. East Germany, losing 2–1.

=== Rugby league ===
On June 10, 1989, an exhibition game between the English teams the Wigan Warriors and the Warrington Wolves at County Stadium. Wigan would win 12–5, in front of a crowd of 17,773.

=== Professional wrestling ===
The World Wrestling Federation (now World Wrestling Entertainment) held WrestleFest 1988 at County Stadium on July 31, 1988. The event was headlined by Hulk Hogan defeating André the Giant in a steel cage match.

=== Ice Capades ===
Due to the large seating capacity, in July 1953 the new stadium hosted the Ice Capades for nine consecutive nights.

== Replacement and demolition ==
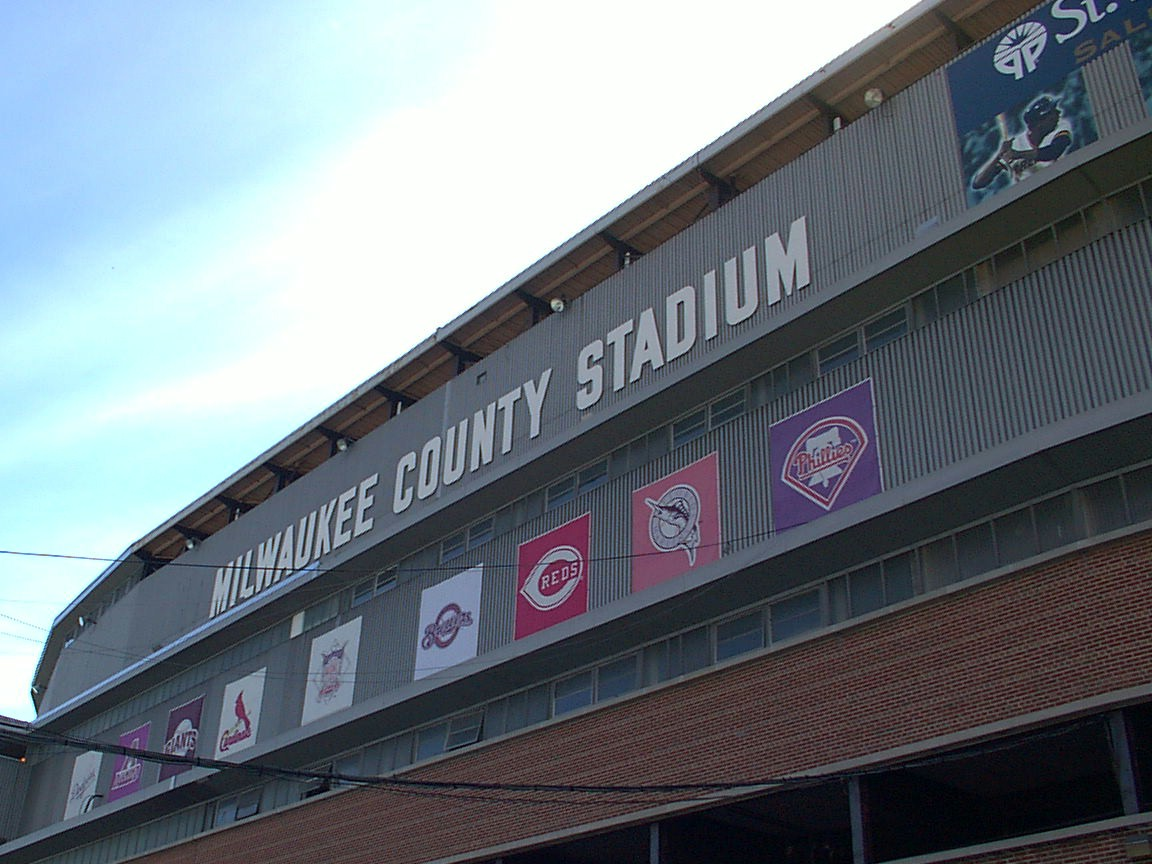
Third base grandstand marquee in 2000.

By the 1990s, County Stadium was considered outdated, lacking the amenities (most notably luxury boxes) that generated additional revenue for teams. On July 11, 1992, Selig announced plans for a publicly financed replacement to be built adjacent to County Stadium, opening in time for the 1994 season. In the meantime, a demonstration luxury box was built in the stadium in order to demonstrate the viability of one to local politicians and the city's larger corporations. In addition, the stadium was the only one in MLB that lacked some sort of color videoboard (it used a monochrome Omega scoreboard built in 1980).

The new stadium funding plan proved to be extremely controversial, and it was not until 1996 that groundbreaking began on the new stadium, by now named Miller Park as part of a sponsorship deal with nearby Miller Brewing Company. Miller Park's most distinctive new feature was a retractable roof, deemed essential to drawing fans during the cool and unpredictable Wisconsin spring. At the time of the groundbreaking, Miller Park was scheduled to open in 2000, making 1999 the final season in County Stadium.

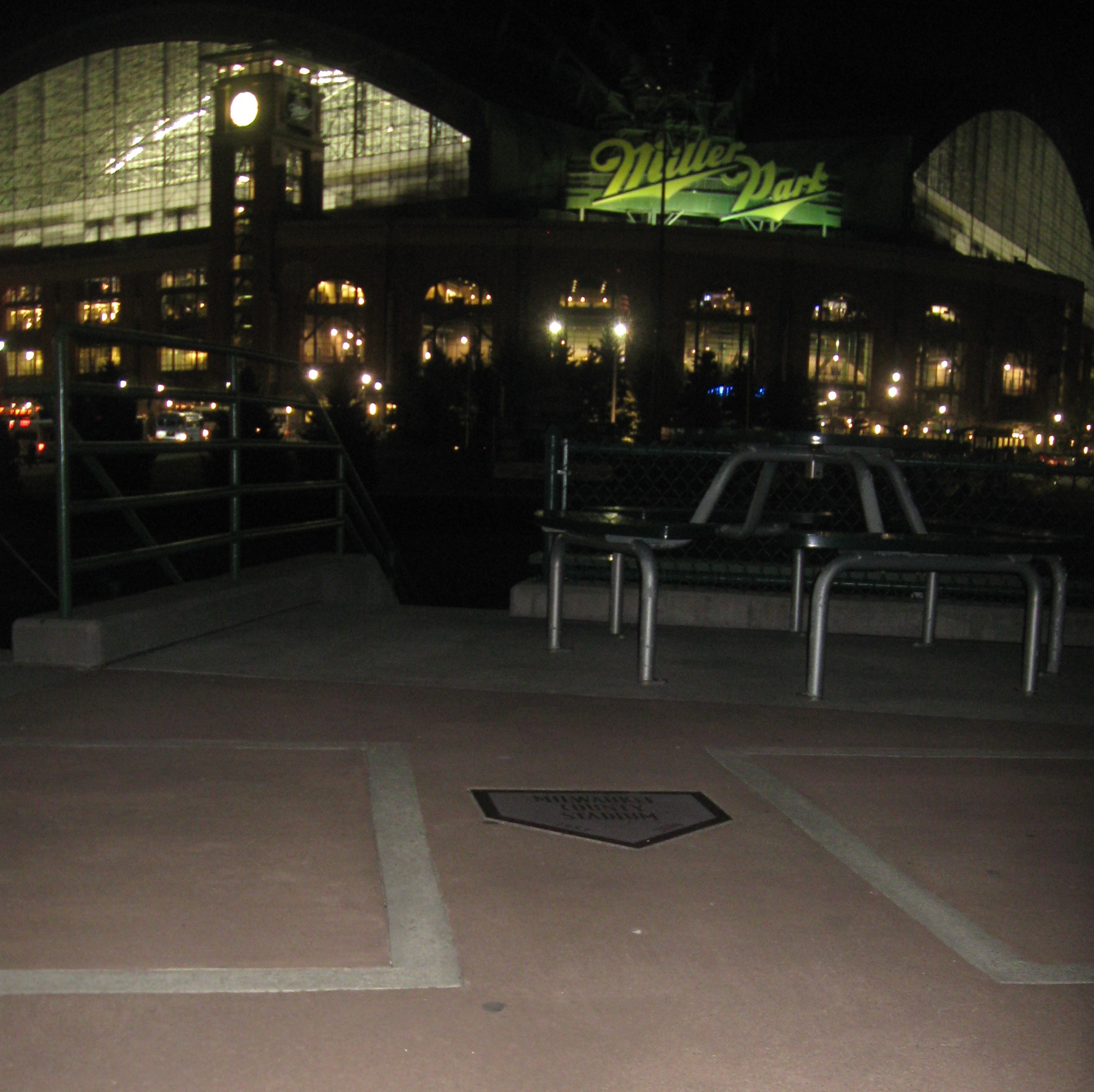
Home Plate Marker

The Brewers opened the 1999 season intending to bid farewell to their old park. On July 14, three construction workers at the Miller Park site were killed in the collapse of the site's "Big Blue" crane while attempting to install a 400-ton roof panel. A good part of the construction site was also damaged as a result. Cleanup and an investigation delayed the closing of County Stadium to the end of the 2000 season. There was some talk of having the Brewers move into Miller Park in the middle of 2000, but it was determined that too many corners would have to be cut in order for it to be ready at that time.

The final major league game at County Stadium was on September 28, 2000, where the Brewers lost to the Cincinnati Reds 8–1. Warren Spahn threw out the first pitch to Del Crandall, and also in attendance were Willie Davis, Hank Aaron, and Robin Yount.

After the game, the Brewers held a closing ceremony to mark the stadium's end. During the ceremony, home plate and the pitching rubber of County Stadium were removed to be placed at Miller Park. Then, former Braves, Brewers, and Packers legends who had played at County Stadium during its history were introduced by broadcasters Earl Gillespie, Merle Harmon, and Bob Uecker, with Uecker delivering the closing speech, as each of the stadium's light towers were symbolically turned off. Then-Brewers play-by-play announcer Matt Vasgersian later recalled that "I was on the air when they did the closing ceremony ... The stadium was sold out. The stadium was falling apart by 2000, and I saw grown men and women crying to say goodbye to County Stadium."

County Stadium was demolished on February 21, 2001. Although most of the stadium site is now covered with parking for Miller Park, the site of the old infield was converted into a Little League park and is now called Helfaer Field. On a picnic concourse next to the playing field of Helfaer Field, there is an outline of where home plate was at County Stadium and also a bronze marker in the nearby parking lot marking where Hank Aaron's 755th and final career home run landed. Part of the site is also now home to the Teamwork sculpture, honoring the three workers killed by the Big Blue Crane collapse.

Despite the stadium no longer existing, an abstract design of County Stadium is retained within Milwaukee's city flag (along with a former Braves logo which has changed to represent Native American origins), whose replacement has been debated for the last two decades.

== See also ==
- List of baseball parks in Milwaukee
- List of Green Bay Packers stadiums

Preceded by Braves Field	Home of the Milwaukee Braves; 1953–1965	Succeeded by Atlanta–Fulton County Stadium
Preceded by Sick's Stadium	Home of the Milwaukee Brewers; 1970–2000	Succeeded by Miller Park
Preceded by Marquette Stadium	Milwaukee Home of the Green Bay Packers; 1953–1994	Succeeded by Last Stadium
Preceded by Shorewood Stadium	Home of the Milwaukee Panthers; 1968–1971	Succeeded by Shorewood Stadium
Preceded by Cleveland Stadium; Three Rivers Stadium	Host of the All-Star Game; 1955; 1975	Succeeded by Griffith Stadium; Veterans Stadium
