= Ed Napoleon =

American baseball player and manager (1937–2020)

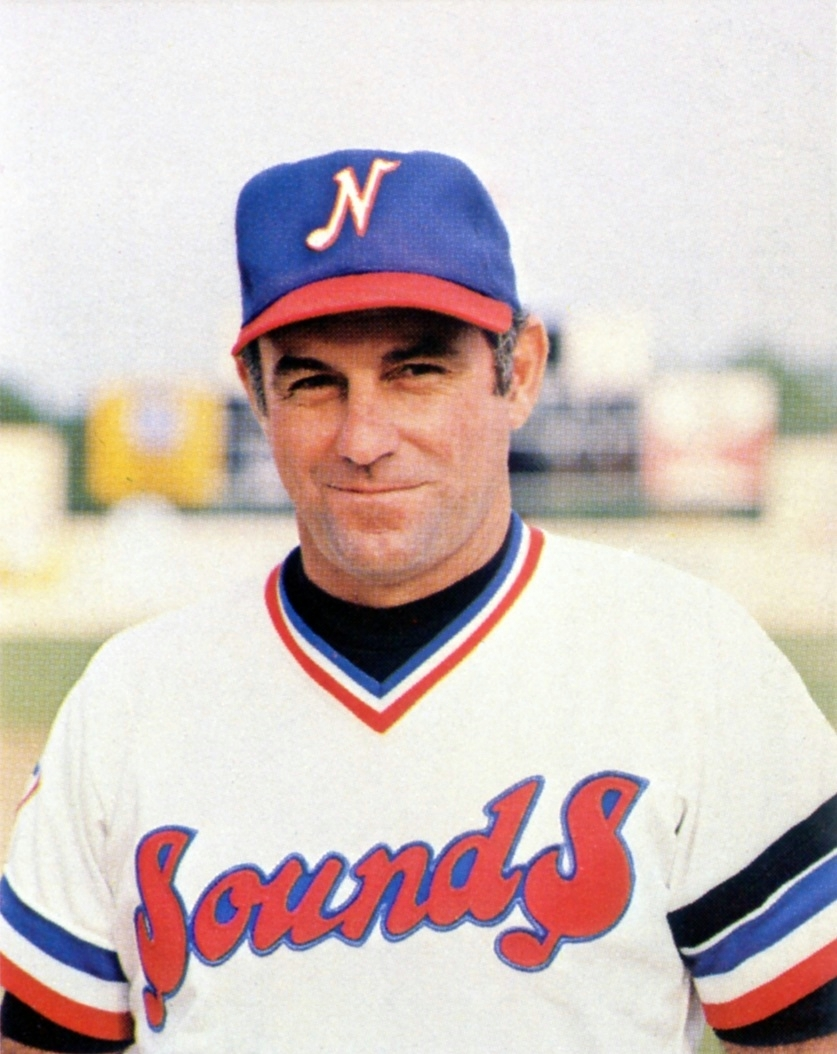
- Napoleon with the Nashville Sounds in 1980
- Coach
- Born: September 17, 1937; Baltimore, Maryland, U.S.
- Died: April 28, 2020 (aged 82); Florida, U.S.
- Batted: Right Threw: Right
- Stats at Baseball Reference

Teams
- Cleveland Indians (1983–1985); Kansas City Royals (1987–1988); Houston Astros (1989–1990); New York Yankees (1992–1993); Texas Rangers (1995–2000)

Edward George Napoleon (September 17, 1937 – April 28, 2020) was an American professional baseball player, manager and coach whose career lasted for over 45 years. During that period, he was a coach in Major League Baseball for five teams over 15 seasons.

Napoleon was born in Baltimore, Maryland. An outfielder during his active career, he played for the St. Louis Cardinals and Pittsburgh Pirates organizations from 1956 until 1970. He threw and batted right-handed and was listed as 5 feet 9 inches (1.75 m) tall and 170 pounds (77 kg).

Napoleon became a minor-league manager for the Pirates' organization in 1970, helming their Rookie-level Gulf Coast League affiliate for four years. He then spent nine consecutive seasons in the New York Yankees' minor-league system, as a coach for West Haven of the Double-A Eastern League (1974–1975, 1979), Tacoma of the Triple-A Pacific Coast League (1978), and Nashville of the Double-A Southern League (1980–1982); in between, Napoleon managed Oneonta of the short-season New York–Penn League (1976) and Fort Lauderdale of the Class-A Florida State League (1977).

Napoleon reached the major leagues as a coach for the Cleveland Indians from 1983–1985, then managed Eugene of the Northwest League, short-season Class-A affiliate of the Kansas City Royals, in 1986. He returned to coach in the majors with the Royals from 1987–1988 and the Houston Astros in 1989–1990. He managed the Rookie-level Gulf Coast Orioles in 1991, then returned to MLB as a coach with the New York Yankees in 1992–1993 and the Texas Rangers from 1995–2000. He was retired from 2001–2003 before returning in 2004 as a special minor-league instructor with the Cincinnati Reds, serving until 2007.
