= Félix Torres (baseball) =

Puerto Rican baseball player (1932–2025)

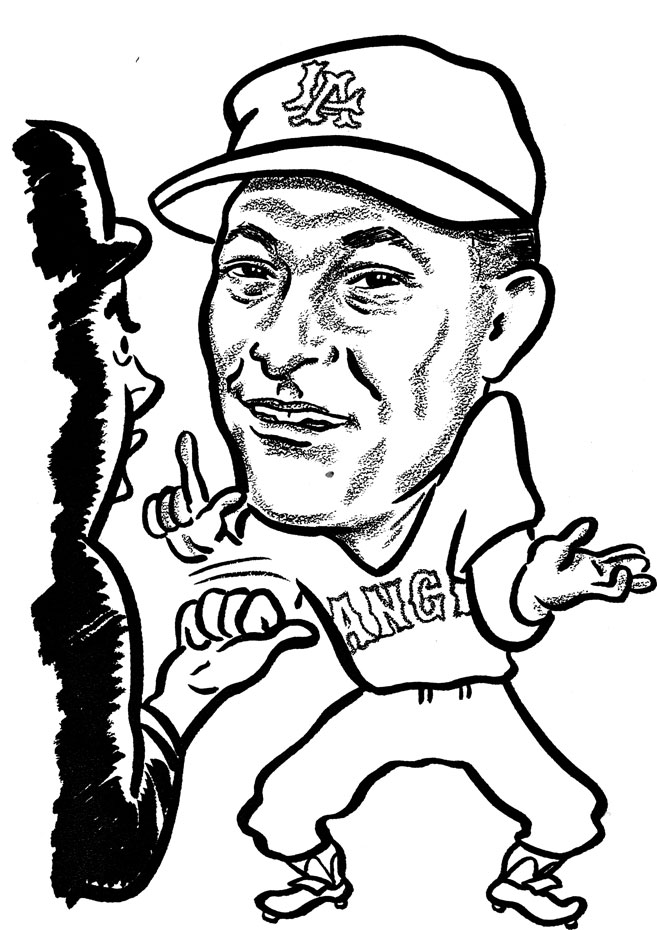
- Illustration by Jack Lane, 1962
- Third baseman
- Born: May 1, 1932; Ponce, Puerto Rico
- Died: August 8, 2025 (aged 93)
- Batted: Right Threw: Right

MLB debut
- April 10, 1962, for the Los Angeles Angels

Last MLB appearance
- October 3, 1964, for the Los Angeles Angels

MLB statistics
- Batting average: .254
- Home runs: 27
- Runs batted in: 153
- Stats at Baseball Reference

Teams
- Los Angeles Angels (1962–1964)

Félix Torres Sánchez (Spanish: [ˈfeliɣ̞s ˈtores ˈsantʃes]; May 1, 1932 – August 8, 2025) was a Puerto Rican professional baseball player who played three seasons for the Los Angeles Angels of Major League Baseball after spending time in the Cincinnati Redlegs and Philadelphia Phillies farm systems.

== Career ==
The 5 ft 11 in (1.80 m), 165 lb (75 kg) third baseman was initially signed by the Cincinnati Redlegs prior to the 1955 season. He played in their minor league system in 1955 and briefly in 1956, before leaving organized baseball—he returned to the Cincinnati farm system in 1960. Prior to the 1961 season, he was acquired by the Philadelphia Phillies, but was never called up to the major league level. After the season, on November 27, 1961, he was acquired by the Angels in the 1961 Rule 5 draft.

Torres played three seasons in Major League Baseball, making his major league debut with the Los Angeles Angels in 1962. On April 10, 1962, Torres went 0-for-4 in his major league debut against the Chicago White Sox at Comiskey Park. In his third career game, a 5–0 loss to the Minnesota Twins at Dodger Stadium, Torres earned his first career hit, a leadoff double off pitcher Jim Kaat.

In 1962, his rookie season, the career .254 hitter hit 11 home runs and batted in 74 runs, far more than the 51 he would knock in the next season. In 127 games, he batted .259 and scored a career-high 44 runs. During the 1963 season, Torres played in a career-high 138 games, but had his least-productive power-hitting season, launching only 4 home runs. Torres did, however, hit .261 on 121 hits, both career-high marks. Torres hit a career-high 12 home runs in 1964, the third highest total by an Angel that year, behind only teammates Joe Adcock (21) and Jim Fregosi (18). Although he reached a career high in 1964 in both home runs and slugging percentage, he set career-lows in games played, runs, hits, RBIs, and batting average before eventually settling into retirement following the season.

Although he was mostly known for his playing time for the Angels, before his Major League Baseball career began, he participated in the 1960 Caribbean Series. Torres tied for the tournament lead in home runs, hitting three in the week-long competition. Torres shared the honors with fellow-Puerto Rican Herman Davis and Héctor López of Panama, who spent time in Major League Baseball during his career.

== Death ==
Torres died on August 8, 2025, at the age of 93.

== See also ==
- List of Major League Baseball players from Puerto Rico
- 1960 Caribbean Series
