= Daryl Spencer =

American baseball player (1928–2017)

- Infielder
- Born: July 13, 1928; Wichita, Kansas, U.S.
- Died: January 2, 2017 (aged 88); Wichita, Kansas, U.S.
- Batted: Right Threw: Right

Professional debut
- MLB: September 17, 1952, for the New York Giants
- NPB: 1964, for the Hankyu Braves

Last appearance
- MLB: July 11, 1963, for the Cincinnati Reds
- NPB: 1972, for the Hankyu Braves

MLB statistics
- Batting average: .244
- Home runs: 105
- Runs batted in: 428

NPB statistics
- Batting average: .275
- Home runs: 152
- Runs batted in: 391
- Stats at Baseball Reference

Teams
- New York / San Francisco Giants (1952–1953, 1956–1959); St. Louis Cardinals (1960–1961); Los Angeles Dodgers (1961–1963); Cincinnati Reds (1963); Hankyu Braves (1964–1968, 1971–1972)

Career highlights and awards
- 2× Best Nine Award (1964, 1965)
Medals
Representing United States
Global World Series
Gold medal – first place	1955 Milwaukee	Team

Daryl Dean Spencer (July 13, 1928 – January 2, 2017) was an American professional baseball player and infielder who played shortstop, second base and third base in Major League Baseball (MLB) between 1952 and 1963 for the New York / San Francisco Giants, St. Louis Cardinals, Los Angeles Dodgers and Cincinnati Reds. He played for the Hankyu Braves of Nippon Professional Baseball (NPB) between 1964 and 1972. On April 15, 1958, he hit the first home run in San Francisco Giants' history in an 8–0 victory over the Dodgers. He threw and batted right-handed and was listed as 6 feet 2 inches (1.88 m) tall and 185 pounds (84 kg).

Spencer was a native and longtime resident of Wichita, Kansas, graduating from East High School and attending Wichita State University. He signed with the Giants in 1949 and, in his first full MLB season, 1953, he started a combined 108 games at three infield positions, hitting 20 home runs, a career high. But he batted only .208, then spent 1954 and 1955 in military service.

Spencer's peak years came between 1956 and 1960 as the Giants' regular shortstop (1956–1958) and second baseman (1959), then as the Cardinals' starting shortstop in 1960. He averaged 148 games played over those five years, with 70 total home runs. His Opening Day 1958 homer, hit at San Francisco's Seals Stadium against the Dodgers' Don Drysdale, a future Baseball Hall of Famer, came in the fourth inning; the solo shot made the score 3–0 at the time. The contest was the first-ever in California for the Giants and Dodgers after each team had moved from New York City during the offseason.

Spencer led National League shortstops in errors committed in 1957 and 1958. He reverted to a utility role during his final three MLB seasons. Over all or parts of ten big league seasons, Spencer appeared in 1,098 games. His 901 hits included 145 doubles, 20 triples and 105 homers. He was credited with 428 runs batted in and batted .244 lifetime.

He then played for the Hankyu Braves in the Pacific League in Japan between 1964 and 1972, hitting an additional 152 home runs. He also was credited with introducing the concept of hitting for the cycle in NPB. As the story goes, on July 16, 1965, he finished the cycle with a triple against the Kintetsu Buffaloes, and absolutely celebrated it. Japanese media was confused about it, so they asked Spencer why he had celebrated on that triple. His response was simply that he questioned that they did not have it there, and stated that in MLB, hitting for the cycle was a major achievement. After NPB dug through records, it was discovered that hitting for the cycle happened 23 times before, so NPB made and gave awards to the players who managed to hit for the cycle. He was also on the road to winning an offensive Triple Crown that season, but in 5 games, he was intentionally walked on all his plate appearances, to the point that supposedly, he held his bat the other way around in one at bat in protest, wanting the pitcher to strike him out. This incident would be similar to the Sadaharu Oh single season home run incident many years later, with foreigners Randy Bass, Tuffy Rhodes, and Alex Cabrera, where they would get intentionally walked to prevent them from breaking Oh's single season home run record of 55.

His pro baseball career included 20 seasons spanning 24 years. He was inducted into the Kansas Baseball Hall of Fame in 1971.

Spencer died on January 2, 2017, at the age of 88.
