= Bill Stewart (baseball) =

American baseball player (1928-2013)

- Outfielder/Pinch hitter
- Born: April 12, 1928; Bay City, Michigan, U.S.
- Died: September 25, 2013 (aged 85); Northville, Michigan, U.S.
- Batted: Right Threw: Right

MLB debut
- April 17, 1955, for the Kansas City Athletics

Last MLB appearance
- September 25, 1955, for the Kansas City Athletics

MLB statistics
- Batting average: .111
- Home runs: 0
- Runs batted in: 0

Teams
- Kansas City Athletics (1955)

William Wayne Stewart (April 12, 1928 – September 25, 2013) was an American professional baseball player. The outfielder appeared in 11 Major League games played for the Kansas City Athletics in 1955. A native of Bay City, Michigan, he threw and batted right-handed, stood 5 feet 11 inches (1.80 m) tall and weighed 185 pounds (84 kg).

Stewart attended Michigan State University, where he played baseball. He signed with the Philadelphia Athletics in 1949 and his professional baseball career lasted for nine seasons and 971 games, all but 51 of them in the Athletics' organization. In his 1955 big-league trial, Stewart began the season (the A's first in Kansas City) on the varsity, and went hitless in three at bats during April. Sent to the Triple-A Columbus Jets, Stewart hit .299 with 12 home runs in 92 games. He was recalled by Kansas City when the rosters expanded in September, and played in eight more games, three as a starting outfielder.

On September 11, 1955, in the second game of a doubleheader, Stewart started in right field and collected his only two MLB hits, a single and a double off veteran left-hander Eddie Lopat of the Baltimore Orioles. Baltimore won, 4–2, with Lopat recording the penultimate victory of his pitching career.
