= Bob Boyd (baseball) =

American baseball player (1919–2004)

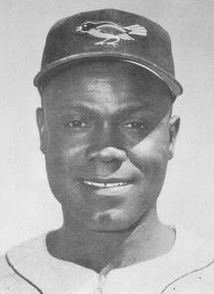
- Boyd, circa 1957
- First baseman
- Born: October 1, 1919; Potts Camp, Mississippi, U.S.
- Died: September 7, 2004 (aged 84); Wichita, Kansas, U.S.
- Batted: Left Threw: Left

Professional debut
- NgL: 1946, for the Memphis Red Sox
- MLB: September 8, 1951, for the Chicago White Sox

Last MLB appearance
- September 24, 1961, for the Milwaukee Braves

MLB (Note: On December 16, 2020, Major League Baseball declared the Negro leagues, from the span of 1920–1948, to be a "Major League". Boyd's statistics reflect his time in the Negro leagues from 1946–1948.) statistics
- Batting average: .298
- Home runs: 21
- Runs batted in: 201
- Stats at Baseball Reference

Teams
- Memphis Red Sox (1946–1950); Chicago White Sox (1951, 1953–1954); Baltimore Orioles (1956–1960); Kansas City Athletics (1961); Milwaukee Braves (1961)

Career highlights and awards
- 3x NgL All-Star (1947–1949); First black player to sign with the White Sox; Turned the first opening day triple play in major league history

Robert Richard Boyd (October 1, 1919 – September 7, 2004) was an American first baseman in the Negro leagues and Major League Baseball.

== Career ==
Nicknamed "Rope" for his line-drive hitting, Boyd served in the US Army during World War II, and played in the Negro leagues with the Memphis Red Sox (1947–49), and in the major leagues for the Chicago White Sox (1951, 1953–54), Baltimore Orioles (1956–60), Kansas City Athletics (1961) and Milwaukee Braves (1961).

The 5 ft 10 in (1.78 m), 170 lb (77 kg) Boyd threw and batted left-handed, and he could shine with his glove. He was a contact hitter, slight of frame, and did not produce the kind of home run power expected from a major league first baseman. He started his professional career in the Negro leagues with the Memphis Red Sox, and played three seasons for them between 1947 and 1949, batting .352, .369 and .371, respectively.

In 1950, Boyd became the first black player to sign with the Chicago White Sox. He made his debut on September 8, 1951. Basically a backup player and pinch-hitter with the Sox, in 1954 he was sent to the St. Louis Cardinals, but did not play for them, spending 1954 and 1955 with Houston in the Double-A Texas League and hitting .321 and .310. At the end of the 1955 season, he was drafted by the Baltimore Orioles from St. Louis in the Rule 5 draft. In 1956 with the Orioles, he hit .311 with two homers and 11 RBI in 70 games.

Boyd enjoyed a career season in 1957. Only eight batters reached the .300 mark in the American League, and he finished fourth in the batting race with a .318 average behind Ted Williams (.388), Mickey Mantle (.365) and Gene Woodling (.321), and over Nellie Fox, Minnie Miñoso, Bill Skowron and Roy Sievers. Beside this, Boyd became the first Oriole regular in the 20th century to hit over .300 in batting average. The following year, he batted .309 with a career-high seven home runs.

Boyd ended his majors career in 1961. He compiled a .293 batting average with 19 home runs and 175 RBI in 693 games. Thanks to his discipline at the plate and knowledge of the strike zone, he registered an outstanding 1.465 walk-to-strikeout ratio (167-to-114). At first base, he committed only 36 errors in 4159 chances for a .991 fielding average. Via Fangraphs, Boyd has the best hitting season in the history of professional baseball, posting a Weighted Runs Created Plus of +264.

Bob Boyd died at age 84 in Wichita, Kansas. He is a member both of the Negro League Hall of Fame and of the National Baseball Congress Hall of Fame. His nephew Dennis "Oil Can" Boyd pitched for three MLB teams, most notably the Boston Red Sox, between 1982 and 1991.

== See also ==
- List of Negro league baseball players
- List of Negro league baseball players who played in Major League Baseball

== Sources ==
- Interview with Bob Boyd
- Negro League Baseball Players Association
- National Baseball Congress Hall of Fame
- Retrosheet Official Web Page
