= Ray Noble (baseball) =

Cuban baseball player (born 1919)

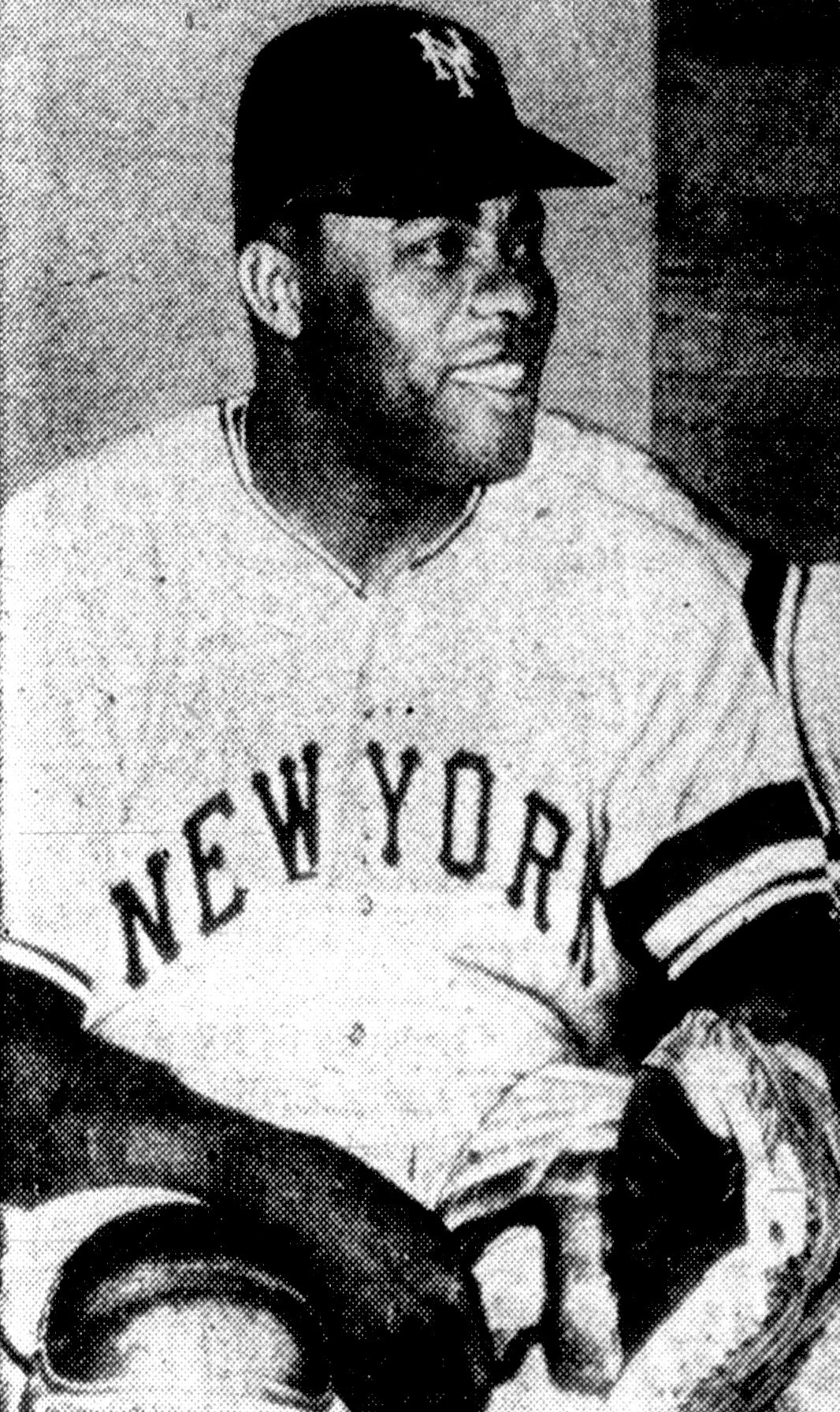
- Catcher / Corner outfielder
- Born: March 15, 1919; Central Hatillo, Cuba
- Died: May 9, 1998 (aged 79); Brooklyn, New York, U.S.
- Batted: Right Threw: Right

Professional debut
- NgL: 1945, for the New York Cubans
- MLB: April 18, 1951, for the New York Giants

Last MLB appearance
- September 22, 1953, for the New York Giants

MLB statistics
- Batting average: .237
- Home runs: 14
- Runs batted in: 75
- Stats at Baseball Reference

Teams
- Negro leagues: New York Cubans (1945–1948); Major League Baseball: New York Giants (1951–1953)

Rafael Miguel Noble Magee (March 15, 1919 – May 8, 1998) was a Cuban professional baseball catcher and corner outfielder in the Negro leagues and Major League Baseball (MLB) who played professionally in the United States and his native country between 1945 and 1961. Born in Central Hatillo, in what is now Palma Soriano, Santiago de Cuba Province, he batted and threw right handed and was listed as 5 feet 11 inches (1.80 m) tall and 210 pounds (95 kg).

After spending all or part of four seasons with the New York Cubans of the Negro National League and two years at the Triple-A level of minor league baseball, Noble was 32 years old when he broke into the big leagues on April 18, 1951 with the New York Giants. The rookie was the Giants' second-string catcher that season, starting 26 games behind the plate (workhorse Wes Westrum started 119). He batted .234 with 33 hits, five home runs and 26 runs batted in; all were career highs. During that pennant-winning season, Noble was in the Giants' lineup as their catcher during the ninth inning of Game 3 of the 1951 National League tie-breaker series, when Bobby Thomson hit his famous home run. Noble handled no chances defensively in his one inning of work, and did not get a chance to bat. In the 1951 World Series that followed, he appeared in two games as a pinch hitter and defensive replacement and was hitless in two at bats. In the field, he caught three total innings in relief of Westrum and earned an assist when he threw out Gil McDougald of the New York Yankees for a caught stealing in the eighth inning of Game 6.

Noble played for the Giants through the 1953 season, though he spent most of 1952 in the Open-Classification Pacific Coast League. Altogether, in 107 MLB games, Noble collected 53 hits, including nine career homers, and batted .218. His career continued at the top levels of minor league baseball through 1961.

Noble died at the age of 79 in Brooklyn, New York.

== See also ==
- List of Negro league baseball players who played in Major League Baseball
