= Global World Series =

International baseball tournament held from 1955 to 1957

- Sport: Baseball
- Founded: 1939
- Folded: 1957
- Organizing body: National Baseball Congress
- Continent: International
- Last champion: Japan
- Most titles: United States (6 titles)

The Global World Series was an international semi-pro baseball tournament organized by the United States National Baseball Congress (NBC) in the mid-1950s. It succeeded various international series between the U.S. teams and other countries, from 1939 to 1950. The Global World Series was similar to the Amateur World Series but was not sanctioned by the International Baseball Federation (FIBA) and was not limited to amateur players.

The first two editions, in 1955 and 1956, were held at Milwaukee County Stadium in Milwaukee, and the third and final edition was held at Detroit's Briggs Stadium in 1957. The United States team won the first two editions, defeating a team from Hawaii in both years' finals. The third edition saw Japan defeat Canada in the finals. The tournament was discontinued because of high costs and low attendance.

== History ==
=== Background ===
The National Baseball Congress, founded in 1938, organized a semipro baseball tournament, the NBC World Series (related to the World Series of Major League Baseball in name only), that was held annually in Wichita, Kansas. With district, state, regional and national tournaments in place, NBC president Ray Dumont set out to establish a non-professional global tournament. He started in 1939, with a seven-game series between the NBC World Series champion representing the United States, and the Puerto Rico national champion from Guayama. That Puerto Rico team notably included Pedro "Perucho" Cepeda and Pancho Coimbre. Another series in 1940 included Red Barkley in the U.S. team, and Luis Olmo on Puerto Rico. In 1948, a Can-Am Series with Canada was billed as the Sandlot Baseball World Series. 1950 and 1952 matched the NBC World Series champion against Japan in the Inter-Hemisphere Series.

Dumont began discussing an international tournament featuring multiple semipro teams from across the globe in 1948, supported by J. G. Taylor Spink, publisher of The Sporting News, and Alejandro Aguilar Reyes, founder and then-commissioner of the Mexican League. Despite the Mexican League's recent conflict with Major League Baseball, Dumont also enlisted the support of former MLB Commissioner Happy Chandler, in his role as head of the International Baseball Congress. (Note: Not to be confused with the International Baseball Federation, or FIBA) Chandler in particular sought to expand the existing two-nation series (most recently played between the United States and Japan) to a series involving four nations, or perhaps eight, in 1954; despite the success of the two series in Japan, Chandler felt that, to increase the number and scope of the teams in the tournament, an American city would have to host.

The IBC was supported in their efforts by the U.S. Department of State, which saw it as a means of promoting American ideals worldwide; President Dwight D. Eisenhower personally endorsed the tournament, writing that "friendships derived from sports competition are enduring."

=== Global Series ===
Chandler and Dumont initially sought to host the first Global World Series in 1954, but plans fell through, and it was instead held in 1955. Brooklyn Dodgers president Walter O'Malley volunteered to use Ebbets Field for a world tournament, but Chandler instead selected Milwaukee County Stadium, the new home of the Milwaukee Braves. The 1955 Global World Series included representatives of Hawaii, Colombia, Spain, Puerto Rico, Japan, Canada, the United States, and Mexico. Some countries were represented by their professional or semi-pro club champions, while other national teams comprised a collection of all-stars. The Spanish national team was classified by winning the 1955 European Baseball Championship. Daryl Spencer was on the American team, while Luis Olmo was with Puerto Rico. The participation of the European champions was a coup for Chandler and the IBC, as FIBA had not been able to involve those European countries in the Amateur World Series.

The 1956 U.S. selection, a semi-pro team from Fort Wayne, included John Kennedy, a negro leaguer who would soon become the first African American to play for the Philadelphia Phillies, and Don Pavletich, a future catcher for the Cincinnati Reds. Canada was represented by the North Battleford Beavers, Japan by the Nippon Oil club from Yokohama, and Hawaii by the Honolulu Red Sox. As in 1955, the national teams from Colombia, Mexico, and Puerto Rico were all-star squads, primarily comprising winter league players, while the 1956 European champion was the Netherlands, including former New York Giants prospect Han Urbanus.

In 1957, the series was moved to Briggs Stadium in Detroit. The United States was represented by an amateur club from Sinton, Texas, which included former big leaguers Paul Schramka, Wilmer Fields, and Clint Hartung. The Japanese selection defeated the Edmonton Eskimos of Canada in the final game by a score of 4–2 to win the title. However, the tournament was a financial loss, and efforts to revive it in 1959 were unsuccessful.

== Editions ==
=== International Series (1939–1952) ===
| Year | Host | Champions | Score | Runners-up | Ref. |
| 1939 | (Puerto Rico) San Juan | Puerto Rico; Brujos de Guayama | 4–3 | United States; Duncan Halliburtons | |
| 1940 | (Puerto Rico) San Juan | United States; Enid Champlins | 4–3 | Puerto Rico; Brujos de Guayama | |
| 1948 | (Canada) Kitchener | Canada; London Majors | 4–3 | United States; Fort Wayne General Electrics | |
| 1949 | (Canada) Kitchener | United States; Fort Wayne Kekiongas | 4–2 | Canada; Kitchener Legionnaires | |
| 1950 | (Japan) Osaka and Tokyo | United States; Fort Wayne General Electrics | 3–2 | Japan; Osaka Kanebo | |
| 1952 | (Japan) Osaka and Tokyo | United States; Fort Myer Colonials | 3–2 | Japan; Osaka Kanebo | |

=== Global Series (1955–1957) ===
In 1955, a non-professional Global Series was organized. Teams representing Canada, Columbia, Hawaii (a U.S. territory until 1959), the Netherlands, Japan, Mexico, Puerto Rico, and Spain played in the eight-team tournament. The NBC World Series champion represented the United States. The Global Series only lasted three years.

| Year | Host | Champions | Runners-up | 3rd place | 4th place | Ref. |
| 1955 details | (United States) Milwaukee; Sep. 23 – Sep. 28 | United States; Wichita Boeing Bombers | Hawaii; Honolulu Red Sox | Canada; Saskatoon Gems | Colombia | |
| 1956 details | (United States) Milwaukee; Sep. 7 – Sep. 13 | United States; Fort Wayne Allen Dairymen | Hawaii; Honolulu Red Sox | Japan; Yokohama Nippon Oil | Mexico | |
| 1957 details | (United States) Detroit; Sep. 13 – Sep. 13 | Japan; Kumagai Gumi Constructors | Canada; Edmonton Eskimos | Venezuela | United States; Sinton Plymouth Oilers | |

== See also ==
- Baseball World Cup
- World Baseball Classic
- Kodak World Baseball Classic

== Bibliography ==
- Buege, Bob (Spring 2012). "Global World Series: 1955-57". SABR. Society for American Baseball Research.
