= Baseball at the Central American and Caribbean Games =

Baseball was a sport at the inaugural Central American Games in 1926 and it has remained part of the event's sporting programme throughout its history. Cuba has dominated the tournament since its inception.

== Results ==
Year	Final Host	Medalists				
Year	Final Host	Gold	Silver		Bronze	
1926 details	Mexico City	Cuba	Mexico			
1930 details	(Cuba); Havana	Cuba	Mexico		Panama	
1935 details	(El Salvador); San Salvador	Cuba	Nicaragua	Panama		
1938 details	Panama City	Cuba	Panama		Nicaragua	
1946 details	(Colombia); Barranquilla	Colombia	Dominican Republic		Cuba	
1950 details	Guatemala City	Cuba	Mexico		Nicaragua	
1954 details	Mexico City	Venezuela	Mexico		Dominican Republic	
1959 details	(Venezuela); Caracas	Puerto Rico	Venezuela		Panama	
1962 details	(Jamaica); Kingston	Dominican Republic	Puerto Rico		Mexico	
1966 details	(Puerto Rico); San Juan	Cuba	Puerto Rico		Panama	
1970 details	Panama City	Cuba	Dominican Republic		Mexico	
1974 details	(Dominican Republic); Santo Domingo	Cuba	Dominican Republic		Puerto Rico	
1978 details	(Colombia); Medellín	Cuba	Nicaragua		Puerto Rico	
1982 details	(Cuba); Havana	Dominican Republic	Cuba		Netherlands Antilles	
1986 details	(Dominican Republic); Santiago	Cuba	Netherlands Antilles		Venezuela	
1990 details	Mexico City	Cuba	Puerto Rico		Dominican Republic	
1993 details	(Puerto Rico); Ponce	Cuba	Mexico		Puerto Rico	
1998 details	(Venezuela); Maracaibo	Cuba	Nicaragua		Venezuela	
2002 details	(El Salvador); San Salvador	Puerto Rico	Panama		Dominican Republic	
2006 details	(Colombia); Cartagena	Cuba	Dominican Republic		Mexico	Venezuela
2010 details	(Puerto Rico); Mayagüez	Dominican Republic	Mexico		Nicaragua	
2014 details	(Mexico); Veracruz	Cuba	Nicaragua		Dominican Republic	
2018 details	(Colombia); Barranquilla	Puerto Rico	Cuba		Colombia	
2023 details	(El Salvador); San Salvador	Mexico	Cuba		Venezuela	
2026 details	(Dominican Republic); Santo Domingo	Panama	Nicaragua		Puerto Rico	

== Medal table ==
Rank	Nation	Gold	Silver	Bronze	Total
1	Cuba (CUB)	15	3	1	19
2	Dominican Republic (DOM)	3	4	4	11
3	Puerto Rico (PUR)	3	3	4	10
4	Mexico (MEX)	1	6	3	10
5	Panama (PAN)	1	3	3	7
6	Venezuela (VEN)	1	1	4	6
7	Colombia (COL)	1	0	1	2
8	Nicaragua (NIC)	0	4	3	7
9	Netherlands Antilles (ANT)	0	1	1	2
Totals (9 entries)		25	25	24	74

== Participating teams ==
Team	(Mexico) 1926	(Cuba) 1930	(El Salvador) 1935	(Panama) 1938	(Colombia) 1946	(Guatemala) 1950	(Mexico) 1954	(Venezuela) 1959	(Jamaica) 1962	(Puerto Rico) 1966	(Panama) 1970	(Dominican Republic) 1974	(Colombia) 1978	(Cuba) 1982	(Dominican Republic) 1986	(Mexico) 1990	(Puerto Rico) 1993	(Venezuela) 1998	(El Salvador) 2002	(Colombia) 2006	(Puerto Rico) 2010	(Mexico) 2014	(Colombia) 2018	(El Salvador) 2023	(Dominican Republic) 2026	Total
Aruba																	8th									1
Bahamas																				9th						1
Colombia					1st	4th			6th		4th		6th		7th			8th		4th			3rd		6th	10
Costa Rica					8th	5th																				2
Cuba	1st	1st	1st	1st	3rd	1st			4th	1st	1st	1st	1st	2nd	1st	1st	1st	1st		1st		1st	2nd	2nd	4th	21
Curaçao																								5th	7th	2
Dominican Republic					2nd		3rd		1st	4th	2nd	1st	4th	1st	6th	3rd		5th	3rd	2nd	1st	3rd	8th	4th	5th	18
El Salvador		5th	4th	7th		6th						5th				6th			7th					8th		8
Guatemala		4th	5th			8th										7th			9th	9th	7th	8th				8
Honduras			6th			7th													9th							3
Mexico	2nd	2nd		5th	7th	2nd	2nd	4th	2nd	6th	3rd					4th	2nd		5th	3rd	2nd	5th	4th	1st	8th	19
Netherlands Antilles								5th		7th	9th		7th	3rd	2nd	5th	5th	7th	6th		8th					11
Nicaragua			2nd	3rd		3rd	4th				8th		2nd	6th	5th	4th		2nd	4th	5th	3rd	2nd	5th	6th	2nd	17
Panama		3rd	2nd	2nd	6th			3rd		3rd	5th			3rd	8th	6th		4th	2nd	7th	6th	7th	7th		1st	17
Puerto Rico				4th	4th			1st	3rd	2nd	7th	3rd	3rd	7th	4th	2nd	3rd	6th	1st	6th	4th	4th	1st	7th	3rd	20
U.S. Virgin Islands												6th						9th			9th					3
Venezuela				6th	5th		1st	2nd	5th	5th	5th	4th	5th	5th	3rd		7th	3rd	8th	3rd	5th	6th	6th	3rd		19
Total	2	5	6	7	8	8	4	5	6	7	9	6	7	7	8	7	8	9	10	10	9	8	8	8	8	

== See also ==
- Baseball awards § Americas
- America Baseball Cup
- Baseball at the Pan American Games
- Baseball at the South American Games
