= José Carradero =

Puerto Rican baseball manager (born 1946)

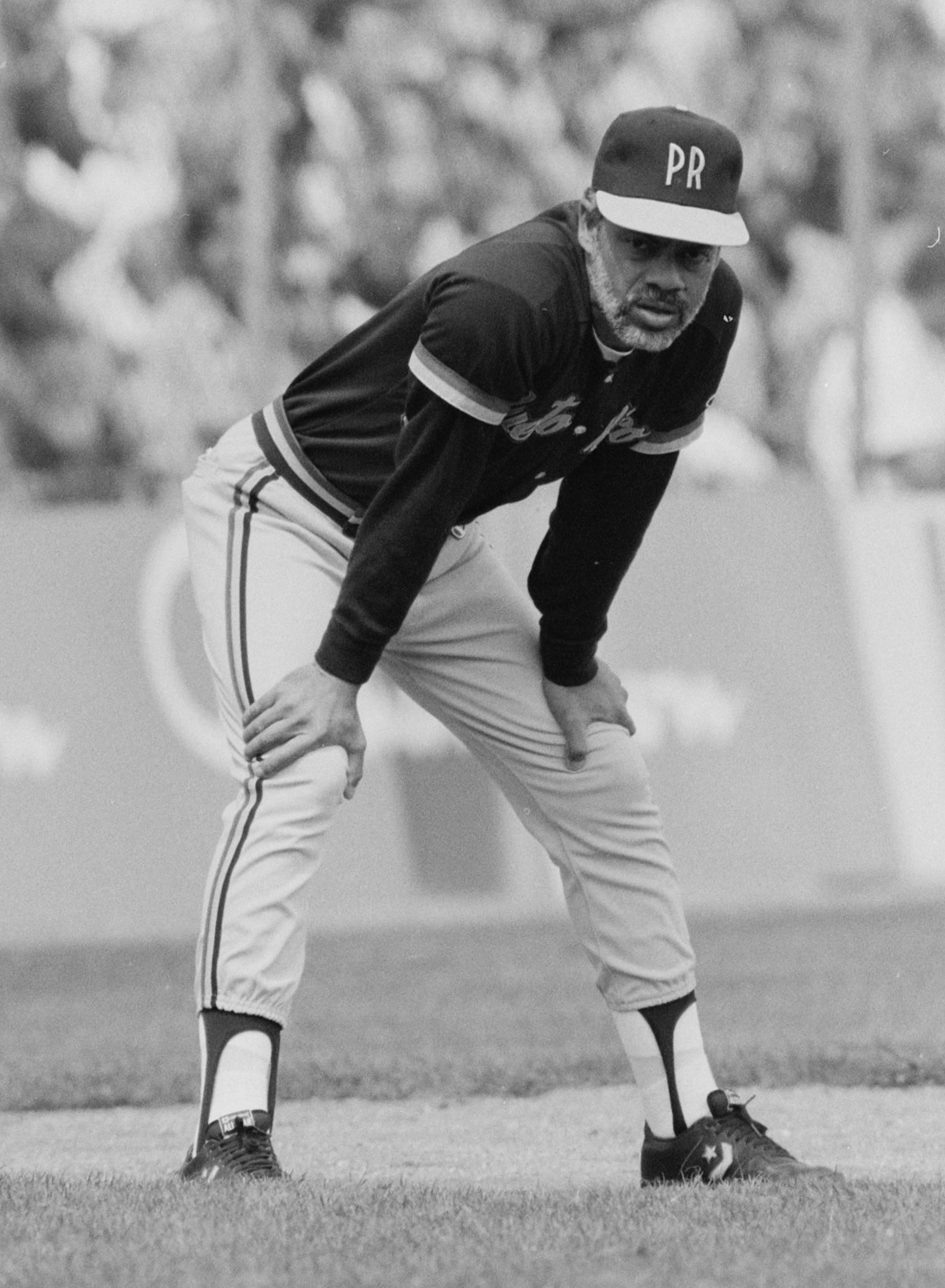
- Manager
- Born: December 12, 1946 (age 79); Humacao, Puerto Rico
Medals
Men's baseball
Representing Puerto Rico
Amateur World Series
Silver medal – second place	1970 Cartagena	Team
Manager for Puerto Rico
Pan American Games
Silver medal – second place	1991 Havana	Team
Bronze medal – third place	1987 Indianapolis	Team
Bronze medal – third place	1995 Mar de Plata	Team
Central American and Caribbean Games
Gold medal – first place	2002 San Salvador	Team
Silver medal – second place	1990 Mexico City	Team
Bronze medal – third place	1993 Ponce	Team
Pan American Championship
Silver medal – second place	1985 Caracas	Team

José Manuel Carradero Muriel (born December 12, 1946), nicknamed Chemane, is a Puerto Rican former baseball player and manager. He was the longtime manager of the Puerto Rico national baseball team, and also managed extensively in Puerto Rico's Liga Federativa, the island's "Double-A" amateur league.

Born in Humacao, Carradero earned a bachelor's degree in Business Administration from the University of Puerto Rico, Río Piedras Campus. He had a successful 16-year playing career as a catcher in Puerto Rico's Double-A amateur baseball, playing for the Ponce, Humacao, Río Piedras, and Yabucoa clubs. He was selected to several Puerto Rican national teams in the late 1960s; as a player, Carradero participated in three Amateur World Series, one edition of the Central American and Caribbean Games, and one edition of the Pan American Games. He was part of the Puerto Rican squad that won a bronze medal at the 1970 Amateur World Series in Colombia.

As a player-manager with Yabucoa, he won a national championship in 1980. He would win seven national championships overall as a manager, four with Yabucoa (1980, 1994, 1995, 1996), two with Juncos (1983, 1985) and one with Cidra (1998), the most for any manager in Double-A baseball history.

Carradero was appointed manager of the national team in 1985, and would remain in that position for the next two decades. He won a silver medal at the 1990 Central American and Caribbean Games in Mexico, a bronze medal at the 1993 CAC Games in Ponce, a bronze medal at the 1987 Pan American Games in Indianapolis, a silver medal at the 1991 Pan American Games in Havana, and a bronze medal at the 1995 Pan American Games in Mar del Plata. He also won a bronze medal at the 1988 Summer Olympics in South Korea, when baseball was played as a demonstration sport. He led the country to a gold medal at the 2002 Central American and Caribbean Games in El Salvador.

In 1990, the International Baseball Federation named Carradero best manager. He was inducted into the Puerto Rican Sports Hall of Fame in 2001. A complex of sports facilities is named after him in Humacao.

== Bibliography ==
- Uriarte González, Carlos (2014). La Doble A en Puerto Rico: 1940 a 2013, Vol. 2. Editorial Deportiva CAIN. ISBN 9780983626367.
