= 2026 Central American Baseball Cup =

Tournament details
- Country: Guatemala
- Dates: June 11 – 14
- Teams: 4

Final positions
- Champions: Guatemala (1st title)
- Runners-up: El Salvador
- Third place: Honduras
- Fourth place: Costa Rica

The 2026 Central American Baseball Cup was the 1st edition of the Central American Baseball Cup. The tournament is held in Guatemala City, Guatemala from 11 to 14 June 2026.

Guatemala defeated El Salvador 9-7 to win the championship.

== Participating teams ==
- Costa Rica
- El Salvador
- Guatemala
- Honduras

== Round robin ==
| Pos | Team | Pld | W | L | RF | RA | PCT | GB | Qualification |
|---|---|---|---|---|---|---|---|---|---|
| 1 | Guatemala (H) | 3 | 3 | 0 | 37 | 24 | 1.000 | — | Advance to final |
| 2 | El Salvador | 3 | 2 | 1 | 9 | 13 | .667 | 1 | Advance to final |
| 3 | Costa Rica | 3 | 1 | 2 | 13 | 16 | .333 | 2 | Advance to third-place game |
| 4 | Honduras | 3 | 0 | 3 | 17 | 23 | .000 | 3 | Advance to third-place game |

Updated to match(es) played on incomplete. Source: WBSC Americas
(H) Hosts

| Date | Local time | Road team | Score | Home team | Inn. | Venue | Game duration | Attendance | Boxscore |
|---|---|---|---|---|---|---|---|---|---|
| Jun 11, 2026 | 10:00 | Costa Rica | 8–9 | Guatemala | | Estadio Enrique Trapo Torrebiarte | | | Boxscore |
| Jun 12, 2026 | 11:00 | El Salvador | 3–0 | Honduras | | Estadio Enrique Trapo Torrebiarte | | | Boxscore |
| Jun 12, 2026 | 15:00 | Honduras | 1–2 | Costa Rica | | Estadio Enrique Trapo Torrebiarte | | | Boxscore |
| Jun 12, 2026 | 19:00 | Guatemala | 10–0 | El Salvador | | Estadio Enrique Trapo Torrebiarte | | | Boxscore |
| Jun 13, 2026 | 15:00 | Costa Rica | 3–6 | El Salvador | | Estadio Enrique Trapo Torrebiarte | | | Boxscore |
| Jun 13, 2026 | 19:00 | Honduras | 16–18 | Guatemala | | Estadio Enrique Trapo Torrebiarte | | | Boxscore |

== Finals ==
=== Third-place game ===
| Date | Local time | Road team | Score | Home team | Inn. | Venue | Game duration | Attendance | Boxscore |
|---|---|---|---|---|---|---|---|---|---|
| Jun 14, 2026 | 8:00 | Honduras | 5–2 | Costa Rica | | Estadio Enrique Trapo Torrebiarte | | | Boxscore |

=== Championship ===
| Date | Local time | Road team | Score | Home team | Inn. | Venue | Game duration | Attendance | Boxscore |
|---|---|---|---|---|---|---|---|---|---|
| Jun 14, 2026 | 11:00 | El Salvador | 7–9 | Guatemala | | Estadio Enrique Trapo Torrebiarte | | | Boxscore |

== Final standing ==
| Rank | Team |
|---|---|
| 1st place, gold medalist(s) | Guatemala |
| 2nd place, silver medalist(s) | El Salvador |
| 3rd place, bronze medalist(s) | Honduras |
| 4 | Costa Rica |

== External websites ==
- Official website
