= Andrés Quintero =

Venezuelan baseball player

- Pitcher
- Died: August 15, 1982; Caracas, Venezuela
- Batted: Unknown Threw: Right

Career highlights and awards
- Amateur World Series MVP (1953)

Member of the Venezuelan

Baseball Hall of Fame
- Induction: 2015 (as part of 1959 PanAm team)
Medals
Men's baseball
Representing Venezuela
Amateur World Series
Silver medal – second place	1953 Mexico City	Team
Silver medal – second place	1953 Caracas	Team
Pan American Games
Bronze medal – third place	1955 Mexico City	Team
Central American and Caribbean Games
Gold medal – first place	1954 Mexico City	Team
Coach for Venezuela
Pan American Games
Gold medal – first place	1959 Chicago	Team

Andrés Quintero was a Venezuelan baseball pitcher. He is best known for playing with the Venezuela national baseball team at the 1953 Amateur World Series in Caracas, where he was named the tournament's most valuable player.

== Career ==
Quintero played with Venezuela at the 1951 Amateur World Series in Mexico City. He also starred in the national amateur tournament with Distrito Federal, defeating Zulia in the 1953 championship 3–2, throwing a complete game.

Quintero was selected by manager José Antonio Casanova to make up the Venezuelan roster at the 1953 Amateur World Series. Quintero started the group stage game against the powerhouse Cuban team; in the first game, he was hit in the face by a line drive, but closed out the game with his head bandaged and blood stains on his face and uniform. He also started the second elimination game of the championship series against Cuba allowing four runs and taking the loss. However, despite Venezuela's loss, he was named MVP after finishing the tournament with a 4–1 win-loss record.

Quintero went on to play in the amateur circuit in Lara state with the Japón club. He returned to the national team at the 1954 Central American and Caribbean Games in Mexico City, where he allowed nine runs (seven earned) in 11.2 innings, for a 5.40 earned run average. At the 1955 Pan American Games, he pitched 22.2 innings, allowing 10 runs (nine earned) for a 3.63 ERA.

He was a coach for the Venezuelan team at the Baseball at the 1959 Pan American Games in Chicago. He was selected by manager Jose Antonio Casanova, who had played professional baseball and, under tournament rules, was not allowed to step onto the playing field and had to manage from the dugout; Quintero, the third base coach, was responsible for conferring with the pitcher on the mound in Casanova's stead. Venezuela ultimately won the gold at the games. The team won gold at the games.

Quintero died in 1982 in Caracas. Venezuelan sports journalist Juan Vené named Quintero as one of the five best players of the "Double A" era (post-professionalization) of Venezuelan amateur baseball. Along with the rest of the 1959 Pan American Games team, Quintero was posthumously inducted into the Venezuelan Baseball Hall of Fame and Museum in 2015.
