= Puerto Rico national baseball team =

National sports team

Information
- Country: Puerto Rico
- Federation: Federación de Béisbol Aficionado de Puerto Rico
- Confederation: COPABE
- Manager: Yadier Molina (WBC); Juan González (WBSC)
- Captain: Martin Maldonado
- Team Colors: Blue, Red, White

WBSC ranking
- Current: 6 ▲1 (18 November 2026)
- Highest: 7 (23 July 2025)
- Lowest: 16 (31 December 2021)

Uniforms
Home	Away

Olympic Games
- Appearances: 2 (first in 1988)
- Best result: (bronze) 3rd (1 time, in 1988)

World Baseball Classic
- Appearances: 6 (first in 2006)
- Best result: (silver) 2nd (2 times, most recent in 2017)

World Cup
- Appearances: 26 (first in 1940)
- Best result: (gold) 1st (1 time, in 1951)

Intercontinental Cup
- Appearances: 6 (first in 1973)
- Best result: (silver) 2nd (1 time, in 1973)

Pan American Games
- Appearances: 10 (first in 1959)
- Best result: (gold) 1st (1 time, in 2019)

The Puerto Rico national baseball team (Spanish: Selección de béisbol de Puerto Rico), also known as Team Rubio is the national baseball team of Puerto Rico. The men's senior team is currently ranked 6th in the world as of November 2026. Puerto Rico is the incumbent Pan American and Central American/Caribbean champion, as well as the 2017 World Baseball Classic runner-up. The team competed against Israel, the Dominican Republic, Venezuela and Nicaragua in the 2023 World Baseball Classic. The team that Molina built pulled out an 5–2 victory over their rivals Dominican Republic Dominican Republic–Puerto Rico baseball rivalry

After debuting in the amateur predecessor to the Baseball World Cup, the team won its first medal by finishing second in 1947, a performance that it repeated the following year. In 1951, Puerto Rico became the world baseball champion by winning the event. The team went on to gather six more medals during the tournament's existence, finishing second twice and third four times.

Puerto Rico was an inaugural member of the World Baseball Classic, making its debut in the first edition. The team has advanced to the second round in all of its appearances, in the process becoming the first team to score mercy rule wins over Cuba and the United States. In the 2013 World Baseball Classic, Puerto Rico became the second team from the Western Hemisphere to advance to the final, eliminating two-time defending world champion Japan in the semifinals before finishing as the event's runner-up. The team has also participated in several other international competitions, such as the Central American and Caribbean Games, the Pan American Games, Americas Baseball Cup, Intercontinental Cup, and Haarlem Baseball Week, winning medals in most.

The team competed in the 2026 World Baseball Classic in March 2026.

== Baseball World Cup era ==
=== Early years of amateur baseball ===
Puerto Rico made its debut at the Baseball World Cup, then known as the "Amateur World Series" in 1940, only two years after the creation of the Liga de Béisbol Profesional Roberto Clemente (LBPPR), which at the moment was an amateur league. Like all of the other expansion teams, they finished in the bottom half of the table, tied with Mexico with a record of 2–10. The following year the team repeated this performance, finishing tied with El Salvador. Between 1942 and 1943, Puerto Rico did not participate due to the ongoing World War II to which several LBPPR players were drafted. The team returned in 1944, but finished tied with Nicaragua with a record of 1–6. Puerto Rico declined participation in the 1945 Amateur World Series, joining Mexico and Cuba in absence.

=== World Championship ===
As the LBPPR expanded and became more organized, the quality of players composing the Puerto Rican national team improved. Returning in 1947, Puerto Rico won the silver medal, having entered the round robin tied with a record of 6–2, defeating Nicaragua to advance before losing to the host, Colombia, in the finals. Puerto Rico went 6–1 in the round-robin but lost 11–1 and 2–1 to the Dominicans in the best-of-3 finals. They won their second straight silver medal. M. Ruiz tied for the most doubles (4) and most triples (2). In 1950, the team finished the regular phase of the tournament tied with the Dominican Republic and Cuba for the first place with a record of 9–2, the team defeated Cuba and lost to the Dominican Republic during the round robin phase. However, the Federación Internacional de Béisbol Aficionado (FIBA) ruled that several players that had joined the team were ineligible to play, ruling several key victories "forfeits" and dropping it out of the podium. This incident was the result of the LBPPR from amateur to professional a few years earlier.

In 1951, Puerto Rico earned a record of 7–3 in the regular stage, handing Cuba its only defeat in the first games. After advancing, the team went undefeated with wins over Cuba and Venezuela to secure the gold medal. The team was headlined by Sotero Ortiz who scored more runs (21) and stole more bases (10) than anyone else, while teammate Ramon Maldonado hit 8 doubles to lead the statistic. In 1952, Puerto Rico went 7–3, including 2–2 in the final round to take bronze medal. They were the only team to beat Cuba in the finals. W. Figueredo led in triples (3) while J.R. Garcia led in homers (2) and steals (7). Sotero Ortiz tied for the most doubles (4) and runs (13). Due to the improving quality of its players, Puerto Rico soon began experiencing the loss of its best players to the professional leagues at a very young age, including Roberto Clemente and Orlando Cepeda. In 1953, the team finished 6th with a record of 5–5. However, Félix Torres drove in 15 runs to lead the Series.

By the time that the series resumed in 1963, Major League Baseball had become the primary employer of Puerto Rican talent, making them ineligible to play in the Amateur World Series and the team did not participate in this edition. Back for the tournament in 1965, Puerto Rico won Bronze with a 5–3 record. Andres Cruz led the Series in average (.485), hits (16) and RBI (8). Pitcher Efrain Contreras set an Amateur World Series record by striking out 19 against the Netherlands Antilles. After another hiatus of four years, the event resumed in 1969, which saw Panama, Puerto Rico, Colombia and Nicaragua all tied for 5th with 4–6 records. Luis Mercado led the tournament in doubles (6) and tied for the most triples (3). In 1970, Puerto Rico won the bronze medal with a record of 9–2. Ramón Ortiz hit the most home runs (3) in the competition.

=== FIBA vs. FEMBA; unique dual medallist ===
In 1971, Puerto Rico finished tied with Nicaragua in the third place with a record of 6–3, but did not receive the bronze medal due to their individual series. Carlos Lowell led all pitchers with 3 wins. In 1972, Dominican Republic, Puerto Rico and Chinese Taipei tied for 6th, all with 9–6 marks. The team was managed by Roberto Clemente (only weeks prior to his death) and featured a no-hitter by Sandalio Quinonez against Costa Rica. In 1973, Puerto Rico participated in two versions of the Amateur World Series due to internal conflicts in the sport, in the Federación Internacional de Béisbol Aficionado version, the team won the silver medal with a record of 10–3, with two of those loses coming at the hands of eventual winner, Cuba. J. Fontanez led in average (.432). The team was managed by Vic Power. A splinter cell of the national team won the bronze at the event's Federación Mundial de Béisbol Amateur version with a record of 8–2. Puerto Rico is the only participant to win medals in both of the 1973 events. Eventually the FIBA and FEMBA merged and the event had only one sanctioning body, the International Amateur Baseball Association (IABF). In 1974, Puerto Rico finished tied for fourth place at the Amateur World Series along Canada, Italy, Chinese Taipei and the Dominican Republic. In the 1976 World Amateur Series, Puerto Rico won Silver with an 8–2 round-robin before leaving the tournament prior to the final round. J.L. de Leon led the tournament with a 0.00 ERA. After missing the 1978 edition of the World Amateur Series, the team came back in 1980, but finished tied in the 7th place with Venezuela with a 4–7 record. After missing out another version of the Amateur World Series, the team returned in 1984, finishing behind Panama with a record of 6–7, despite gathering a 54–46 advantage in runs. Mariano Quinones (2–0, 2.48) was their most effective pitcher. The top hitter was 1B Luis Fontanez (.353/.400/.569). Future MLB player Hector Villanueva was part of the roster, but had an unsuccessful tournament going 2 for 13 with a double and no walks. In the 1986 Amateur World Series, Puerto Rico tied for 7th at 5–6, despite outscoring opponents 56–45. Roberto Santana (.369) led the Series with 6 stolen bases. Eddie Rodriguez (1.28) had two saves. By 1988, the Amateur World Series became known as the Baseball World Cup and Puerto Rico beat both No. 3 Taiwan and No. 4 Japan and lost to No. 1 Cuba by just one run. However, losses to Canada, Nicaragua and South Korea kept the team out of the final four. CF Ángel Morales (.395/.490/.737, 14 R, 14 RBI) and DH Helson Rodriguez (.300/.462/.650) guided the offensive charge. Victor L. Martinez was 0–1 with a 1.80 ERA, the lowest on the staff.

=== Migration of MLB All-Stars and fallout ===
Beginning during the late 1980s and extending throughout the 1990s, Puerto Rico saw a major increase in its production of high-caliber players, including Iván Rodríguez, Roberto Alomar, Bernie Williams, Rubén Sierra, Jorge Posada, Juan González, Carlos Delgado, Edgar Martínez, and Carlos Beltrán. This fact severely limited the quantity of talent available for the national baseball team, due to the protective behavior exhibited by the MLB teams that signed these players since their teenage years. In the 1990 Baseball World Cup, Puerto Rico went 7–2 but finished fourth thanks to the format. They were 4th with 52 runs and second in ERA (2.89). 1B Efrain Garcia (.351/.385/.568, 7 RBI), All-Star CF Ángel Morales (.417/.463/.556, 8 R, 10 RBI), and DH Helson Rodriguez (.371/.385/.714, 3 HR, 11 RBI) paced the offense. Headlining a fine staff was Jesus I. Feliciano (1–0, 0.56). In 1994, Puerto Rico finished with a 3–4 record, with two close one-run losses (3–2 to Panama and 4–3 to the Netherlands). They hit .305 as a team, fifth in that tournament. Top performers were 1B Efrain Garcia (.448/.484/.724, 8 RBI in 7 games), C Jose Lorenzana (.400/.455/.500), RF Joel Perez (.318/.348/.682), and P Nelson Sanchez (1–1, 2.25). After being absent from two World Cups, the team returned in 2005 but Puerto Rico, managed by Bert Peña, went 6–5 despite being outscored overall, 60–56. They finished 8th overall. Randy Ruiz (.346/.452/.654), CF Jesus Feliciano (.378/.410/.649, 10 R, 9 RBI) and Edwards Guzman (.343/.375/.543) led the offense However, former MLB player Angel Echevarria had a weak performance, with averages of .083/.241/.125. Orlando Román (2–0, 0.50) was their clear top starter, as 4 pitchers had ERAs over 8.

Puerto Rico debuted in the inaugural World Baseball Classic by hosting Pool C on March 7, 2006, and defeating Panama with a score of 2–1. The team followed this by winning their second game over the Netherlands, 8–3. Puerto Rico closed the first round by winning Pool C with a 12–2 mercy rule victory over the defending world champion, Cuba. The team opened the second round by defeating the Dominican Republic 7–1. However, the team lost its next game to Venezuela 6–0. Puerto Rico was eliminated with a 4–3 loss in a rematch with Cuba.

=== 2008–2011 ===
Puerto Rico began this Olympic cycle participating in the 2008 Copa América. The team debuted on September 26, 2008, defeating Mexico 2–1. This game was won by Josué Matos. Puerto Rico concluded the tournament's first round undefeated, with victories over Brazil (6:3), Aruba (7:0) and Guatemala (8:0). In the first two games, Andy González hit four doubles, and Carlos Rivera hit his second home run of the round. In the game against Aruba, Orlando Román threw a perfect game over seven innings. In the second round, Puerto Rico defeated Panama (9:4) to qualify for the 2009 Baseball World Cup. On the second date, the team lost their only game of the tournament to Venezuela (5:4). In the next game, the team defeated Netherlands Antilles by ten runs (14:4). Puerto Rico won the tournament on October 5, defeating Nicaragua in the final.

Puerto Rico hosted Pool D of the 2009 World Baseball Classic, debuting with a 7–0 victory over Panama. In its second game, the team defeated the Netherlands 3–1. Both teams met in an immediate rematch to determine the group winner, which Puerto Rico won with scores of 5–0. The team opened the second round by giving the United States its first mercy rule loss, 11–1. Puerto Rico next played Venezuela, losing 2–0. Facing the United States in an elimination game, Puerto Rico lost 6–5 after losing the lead during the final inning. Iván Rodríguez was selected the All-WBC team catcher.

For the Baseball World Cup, Puerto Rico, once again led by Eduardo Pérez, created a roster composed of mostly professional players, including several Major League Baseball athletes. The final cut included infielders Alex Cintrón, Rubén Gotay, Melvin Falú, Carlos Rivera and Angel Sánchez; catchers Orlando Mercado Jr., Stephen Morales, and Raúl Casanova; pitchers Luis Atilano, Mario Santiago, José Santiago, Orlando Román, Juan Padilla, Angel García, Richard Rodríguez, Miguel Mejía, Alexander Woodson, Nelvin Fuentes, Melvin Pizarro and Efraín Nieves as well as outfielders Miguel Negrón, Luis Matos, and Miguel Abreu. José Valentín was selected to perform as both infielder and outfielder. Javier Valentín and Juan González were evaluated, but excluded from the final cut due to previous injuries. The fact that most of the roster was professional received some criticism from the amateur circuit. Journalist Duldin Meléndez of Periodico La Cordillera wrote in a piece that "[Pérez] is not familiar with the [amateur] players and has not even seen them play" expressing a similar concern about the Federation's president, Israel Roldán. Juan Carlos Díaz, infielder of the Bravos de Cidra in Béisbol AA, openly expressed disappointment when he did not receive an invitation, noting that he deserved it after leading the Liga Caribe division with an average of .632 and the league's final in offensive. Making its debut on September 10, 2009, Puerto Rico's first opponent was Cuba.

For the 2010 Central American and Caribbean Games, the number of players per roster was limited to 20. Consequently, players such as Juan González and José Valentín were not included in the final cut. Carlos Delgado was included in the preliminary list but was unable to compete due to injury. The team was mostly composed of professional players such as Víctor Raúl González, Orlando Mercado, Jorge Jiménez, Philip Cuadrado, Adrián Ortiz, Efraín Nieves, Ricard Rodríguez Nick Ortiz, Armando Ríos, Christopher Amador, Edwards Guzmán and Mario Santiago, but also included three amateurs, Antonio Acevedo, Joycet Feliciano and Manuel Romero. Amateur pitcher Jean Ortega was a last minute addition due to an injury suffered by Acevedo. Puerto Rico debuted with a victory over Guatemala in seven innings. The following night the team recorded its second victory, 3:2, over Venezuela, in a game that extended to one extra inning. Efraín Nieves debuted with a shutout victory over Panama, allowing only one hit. Puerto Rico was the leader in its group, closing the first round with a 6:0 victory over the United States Virgin Islands. However, the team lost a 0–1 game to Mexico in the semifinals and the bronze medal to Nicaragua 6–7.

For the 2010 Americas Baseball Cup, Eduardo Pérez assembled an entirely different roster. Several players from the Minor Leagues who were unable to compete at the Central American and Caribbean Games, because this event was not sanctioned by the IBAF, now joined the pre-selection. Only few players, such as Irving Falú were kept from the CAC team. The most notable addition was González, who was joined by Fernando Cabrera, Kiko Calero, Federico Báez, Saúl Rivera, Ramón Vázquez, Gabriel Martinez, Luis Figueroa, Jorge Padilla, Alex Cora and Christian Colón. Puerto Rico was drafted to Group A, along Argentina, Aruba, Canada, Panama and the Dominican Republic.

=== Generational shift (2013–2016) ===
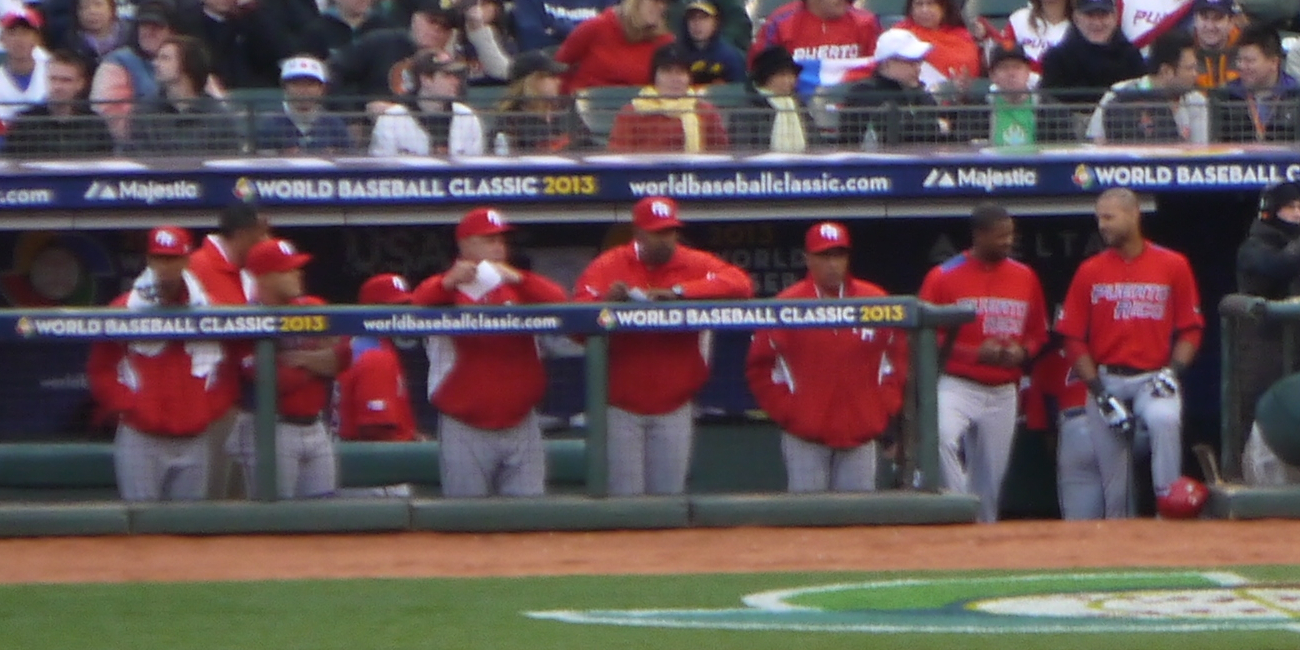
Puerto Rico national team at the 2013 World Baseball Classic

After 2011, the IBAF decided to phase out the Baseball World Cup, with the WBC replacing it as the premier competition in international baseball. During this time frame the team was immersed in a change of the guard, losing MLB All-Stars Iván Rodríguez, Carlos Delgado and Bernie Williams to retirement. As with the previous editions, Puerto Rico hosted the first round of the 2013 Classic. However, this time the team faced different adversaries following an expansion, defeating Spain 3–0 in its debut. Puerto Rico secured classification to the second round by winning a game over Venezuela, 6–3. The team closed the round by losing the seeding game to the Dominican Republic, 4–2. Puerto Rico opened the second round with a 7–1 loss to the United States. The team remained alive by defeating Italy 4–3. In its second consecutive elimination game, Puerto Rico defeated the United States 4–3. Facing the Dominican Republic in another seeding game, the team lost 2–0. Puerto Rico advanced by defeating the defending WBC champion, Japan, with scores of 3–1. In the event finals, the team lost a third contest to the Dominican Republic, 3–0, to finish their participation as the tournament's runner up. Yadier Molina was the All-WBC catcher, while Ángel Pagán and Nelson Figueroa received positions among the outfielders and pitchers.

The date of the 2014 Central American and Caribbean Games has opened the door for Puerto Rico and several other teams to reinforce themselves with MLB players, raising the competitive level of what is usually a low caliber tournament. The team finished fourth.

=== Regional championships (2017–2021) ===
Puerto Rico repeated their previous WBC performance in 2017, finishing as the tournament's runner-up.

For secondary competitions, former MLB player Juan González was named as manager making his debut at the 2018 Central American and Caribbean Games. Unable to request athletes contracted to MLB (or active in MiLB), he assembled a team composed by players active in foreign independent leagues, the local Doble A amateur league and veteran free agents with previous professional experience, making the final cut following a preparatory tournament. González made his official debut as manager in a 5:3 victory over Venezuela. In its next outing, Puerto Rico defeated Cuba 8:1 to snap a 36-year (43-game) winning streak at the CACG. This was followed by wins over the Dominican Republic (4:1) and Mexico (7:1). On July 26, 2018, Puerto Rico defeated second-place Colombia 2:1 to clinch the first place of the round robin. This was followed by inconsequential losses to Panama (2:5) and Guatemala (9:10). González closed his first participation as manager by leading Puerto Rico to the Central American and Caribbean gold medal.

Once again managed by González, Puerto Rico won the gold medal of the 2019 Pan American Games, going undefeated and besting Canada 6:1 in the final. The team tried but failed to qualify for the 2020 Olympics at the eight-team Americas Qualifying Event on May 31 through June 5, 2021.

=== Abridged Olympic circle (2022–2024) ===
Despite being the defending CACG champion, Puerto Rico had to play in the Caribbean Baseball Cup to qualify for the 2023 tournament. Facing issues with the Liga de Béisbol Profesional Roberto Clemente due to itinerary conflicts, González was able to assemble a team composed by players from the local Béisbol Superior Doble A amateur league, beginning the participation with a 7:1 loss to defending champion Curaçao. Puerto Rico then won consecutive shut out games over Cuba (6:0) and the United States Virgin Islands (6:0). The team advanced in the first place of the global standings by defeating the Bahamas with scores of 14:2. It won a rematch (9:3) in the semifinals to contend for the title and qualify for the CACG. Puerto Rico defeated Cuba in the finals with scores of 9:4 to win the IV Caribbean Baseball Cup.

The team competed against Israel, the Dominican Republic, Venezuela and Nicaragua in the 2023 World Baseball Classic in March 2023 in Miami, Florida.

== Results and fixtures ==
The following is a list of professional baseball match results currently active in the latest version of the WBSC World Rankings, as well as any future matches that have been scheduled.

Legend

Win Lose Void or postponed Fixture

=== 2019 ===
Pan American Games GS	July 30	Puerto Rico	7–3	Nicaragua	Campo de Béisbol, Peru
Pan American Games GS	10:00 PET		Boxscore		Attendance: 1,059

Pan American Games GS	July 31	Puerto Rico	4–1	Peru	Campo de Béisbol, Peru
Pan American Games GS	19:00 PET		Boxscore		Attendance: 2,850

Pan American Games GS	August 1	Dominican Republic	1–2 (F/10)	Puerto Rico	Campo de Béisbol, Peru
Pan American Games GS	15:00 PET		Boxscore		Attendance: 1,780

Pan American Games SR	August 2	Puerto Rico	8–5	Canada	Campo de Béisbol, Peru
Pan American Games SR	15:00 PET		Boxscore		Attendance: 2,100

Pan American Games SR	August 3	Puerto Rico	2–1	Colombia	Campo de Béisbol, Peru
Pan American Games SR	19:00 PET		Boxscore		Attendance: 2,313

Pan American Games F	August 4	Puerto Rico	6–1	Canada	Campo de Béisbol, Peru
Pan American Games F	18:00 PET		Boxscore		Attendance: 2,500

WBSC Premier12 GS	November 5	Puerto Rico	1–6	Chinese Taipei	Taichung Stadium, Taiwan
WBSC Premier12 GS	18:30 NST		Boxscore		Attendance: 11,852

WBSC Premier12 GS	November 6	Puerto Rico	0–4	Japan	Taoyuan Stadium, Taiwan
WBSC Premier12 GS	18:00 NST		Boxscore		Attendance: 4,209

WBSC Premier12 GS	November 7	Venezuela	7–1	Puerto Rico	Taichung Stadium, Taiwan
WBSC Premier12 GS	12:00 NST		Boxscore		Attendance: 618

=== 2022 ===
Caribbean Cup GS	December 4	Curaçao	7–1	Puerto Rico	Rodgers Stadium, Bahamas
Caribbean Cup GS	15:00 ET		Boxscore

Caribbean Cup GS	December 6	Puerto Rico	6–0	Cuba	Rodgers Stadium, Bahamas
Caribbean Cup GS	19:00 ET		Boxscore

Caribbean Cup GS	December 7	U.S. Virgin Islands	0–6	Puerto Rico	Rodgers Stadium, Bahamas
Caribbean Cup GS	14:00 ET		Boxscore

Caribbean Cup GS	December 8	Puerto Rico	14–2	Bahamas	Rodgers Stadium, Bahamas
Caribbean Cup GS	19:00 ET		Boxscore

Caribbean Cup SF	December 10	Bahamas	3–9	Puerto Rico	Rodgers Stadium, Bahamas
Caribbean Cup SF	19:00 ET		Boxscore

Caribbean Cup F	December 11	Cuba	4–9	Puerto Rico	Rodgers Stadium, Bahamas
Caribbean Cup F	17:00 ET		Boxscore

=== 2023 ===
World Baseball Classic GS	March 11	Nicaragua	1–9	Puerto Rico	loanDepot Park, United States
World Baseball Classic GS	12:00 ET	LP: J. C. Ramírez (0–1); HR: Elian Miranda (1)	Boxscore	WP: Nicholas Padilla (1–0)	Attendance: 35,399; Umpires: HP – Mike Estabrook, 1B – Alejandro Pecero, 2B – Ángel Hernández, 3B – Chris Graham

World Baseball Classic GS	March 12	Venezuela	9–6	Puerto Rico	loanDepot Park, United States
World Baseball Classic GS	19:00 ET	WP: Pablo López (1–0); Sv: Silvino Bracho (1); HR: Anthony Santander (2), Salvador Pérez (1)	Boxscore	LP: José Berríos (0–1); HR: Eddie Rosario (1)	Attendance: 35,615; Umpires: HP – Chris Guccione, 1B – Chris Graham, 2B – Alejandro Pecero, 3B – Mike Estabrook

World Baseball Classic GS	March 13	Israel	0–10 (F/8)	Puerto Rico	loanDepot Park, United States
World Baseball Classic GS	19:00 ET	LP: Colton Gordon (0–1)	Boxscore	WP: José De León (1–0)	Attendance: 27,813; Umpires: HP – Ron Kulpa, 1B – Alejandro Pecero, 2B – Chris Guccione, 3B – Tim Meyer

World Baseball Classic GS	March 15	Puerto Rico	5–2	Dominican Republic	loanDepot Park, United States
World Baseball Classic GS	19:00 ET	WP: Jovani Morán (1–0); Sv: Edwin Díaz (1); HR: Christian Vázquez (1)	Boxscore	LP: Johnny Cueto (0–1); HR: Juan Soto (2)	Attendance: 36,025; Umpires: HP – Chris Guccione, 1B – Ron Kulpa, 2B – Chris Graham, 3B – Tim Meyer

World Baseball Classic QF	March 17	Puerto Rico	4–5	Mexico	loanDepot Park, United States
World Baseball Classic QF	19:00 ET	LP: Alexis Díaz (0–1); HR: Javier Báez (1), Eddie Rosario (2)	Boxscore	WP: JoJo Romero (2–0); Sv: Giovanny Gallegos (2); HR: Isaac Paredes (1)	Attendance: 35,817; Umpires: HP – Will Little, 1B – Atsushi Fukaya, 2B – Ki Talk Park, 3B – Dan Bellino

=== 2024 ===
WBSC Premier12 GS	November 9	Puerto Rico	1–0	United States	Coloso del Pacífico, Mexico
WBSC Premier12 GS	16:00 UTC−6	WP: Raymond Burgos; Sv: Luis Leroy Cruz; HR: Sabin Ceballos (1)	Boxscore	LP: Sam Benschoter	Attendance: 7,820

WBSC Premier12 GS	November 10	Mexico	7–5	Puerto Rico	Estadio Panamericano, Mexico
WBSC Premier12 GS	20:00 UTC−6	WP: Luis Ángel Rodríguez; Sv: R. J. Alaniz; HR: José Rojas (1)	Boxscore	LP: Jason Garcia	Attendance: 2,921

WBSC Premier12 GS	November 12	Netherlands	20–8 (F/7)	Puerto Rico	Estadio Panamericano, Mexico
WBSC Premier12 GS	20:00 UTC−6	WP: Tom de Blok; HR: Didi Gregorius (1), Hendrik Clementina (2), Sharlon Schoop (1)	Boxscore	LP: Agnel Miranda; HR: Ezequiel Pagán (1), John Montes (1)	Attendance: 622

WBSC Premier12 GS	November 13	Puerto Rico	2–5	Venezuela	Estadio Panamericano, Mexico
WBSC Premier12 GS	13:00 UTC−6	LP: Luis Leroy Cruz	Boxscore	WP: Liarvis Breto; HR: Carlos Pérez (1), Hernán Pérez (1)	Attendance: 533

WBSC Premier12 GS	November 14	Puerto Rico	3–4	Panama	Coloso del Pacífico, Mexico
WBSC Premier12 GS	19:00 UTC−6	LP: Rubén Ramírez; HR: Ezequiel Pagán (1), Sabin Ceballos (1)	Boxscore	WP: Alberto Baldonado; HR: Edgar Muñoz (1), Luis Castillo (1)	Attendance: 7,240

=== 2026 ===
World Baseball Classic GS	March 6	Puerto Rico	5-0	Colombia	Hiram Bithorn Stadium, Puerto Rico
World Baseball Classic GS	19:00 AST	WP: Seth Lugo (1–0)	Boxscore	LP: Adrián Almeida (0–1)	Attendance: 18793; Umpires: HP – Alex MacKay, 1B – Mario Villavicencio, 2B – Junior Valentine, 3B – Domingo Paulino

World Baseball Classic GS	March 7	Panama	3-4 (F/10)	Puerto Rico	Hiram Bithorn Stadium in San Juan, Puerto Rico
World Baseball Classic GS	19:00 AST	LP: Severino González (0–1)	Boxscore	WP: Jose Espada (1–0); HR: Darell Hernaiz (1)	Attendance: 18,925; Umpires: HP – Laz Diaz, 1B – Alex MacKay, 2B – Domingo Paulino, 3B – Chang Chan-jung

World Baseball Classic GS	March 9	Cuba	1-4	Puerto Rico	Hiram Bithorn Stadium in San Juan, Puerto Rico
World Baseball Classic GS	19:00 AST	LP: Julio Robaina (0–1)	Boxscore	WP: Elmer Rodríguez (1–0); Sv: Edwin Díaz (1)	Attendance: 19,819; Umpires: HP – Vic Carapazza, 1B – Domingo Paulino, 2B – Tripp Gibson, 3B – Tomoya Ishiyama

World Baseball Classic GS	March 10	Canada	3-2	Puerto Rico	Hiram Bithorn Stadium in San Juan, Puerto Rico
World Baseball Classic GS	19:00 AST	WP: Jordan Balazovic (1–0); Sv: Brock Dykxhoorn (1)	Boxscore	LP: José De León (0–1)	Attendance: 18,997; Umpires: HP – Alex MacKay, 1B – Laz Diaz, 2B – Mario Villavicencio, 3B – Domingo Paulino

World Baseball Classic QF	March 14	Puerto Rico	6-8	Italy	Daikin Park in Houston, Texas, United States
World Baseball Classic QF	14:00 CDT	LP: Seth Lugo (1−1); HR: Willi Castro (1)	Boxscore	WP: Sam Aldegheri (1−0); Sv: Greg Weissert (3)	Attendance: 18,997; Umpires: HP – Carlos Torres, 1B – Bill Miller (umpire), 2B – Jon Byrne, 3B – Zdenek Zidek

== Current Roster ==
Puerto Rico – 2026 World Baseball Classic roster
Players		Coaches
Pitchers: 29 Raymond Burgos; 63 Fernando Cruz; 87 José De León; 39 Edwin Díaz; 35 José Espada; 52 Rico Garcia; 48 Jorge López; 67 Seth Lugo; 16 Jovani Morán; 51 Luis Quiñones; 34 Angel Reyes; 75 Yacksel Ríos; 99 Eduardo Rivera; 18 Elmer Rodríguez; 69 Gabriel Rodriguez; 44 Ricardo Velez	Catchers: 15 Martín Maldonado; 7 Christian Vázquez; Infielders: 28 Nolan Arenado; 13 Edwin Arroyo; 23 Darell Hernáiz; 26 Emmanuel Rivera; 8 Luis Vázquez; Outfielders: 3 Willi Castro; 14 Carlos Cortes; 6 Matthew Lugo; 10 MJ Melendez; 22 Heliot Ramos; 17 Eddie Rosario; 2 Bryan Torres	Manager: 4 Yadier Molina; Coaches: 24 Sandy Alomar Jr. (first base); 73 Alex Cintrón (bench); 56 Joey Cora (third base); 19 Juan González (hitting); 11 Edgar Martinez (hitting); 61 Juan Nieves (bullpen); 33 Edgar Perez (assistant); 50 José Rosado (pitching)
Updated: March 1, 2026

=== Recent Callups ===
Player	No.	Pos.	DOB and age	Team	League
Francisco Lindor		SS	November 14, 1993 (age 33)	New York Mets	Major League Baseball
Carlos Correa		SS	September 22, 1994 (age 32)	Houston Astros	Major League Baseball
Javier Baez		OF	December 1, 1992 (age 33)	Chicago Cubs	Major League Baseball

== Tournament record ==
=== World Baseball Classic ===
World Baseball Classic record							Qualification record			
Year	Round	Position	W	L	RS	RA	W	L	RS	RA
(Puerto Rico) 2006	Quarterfinals	5th	4	2	32	17	No qualifiers held			
(Puerto Rico) (United States) 2009	Quarterfinals	5th	4	2	31	10	No qualifiers held			
(Puerto Rico) (United States) 2013	Runners-up	2nd	5	4	23	26	Automatically qualified			
(Mexico) (United States) 2017	Runners-up	2nd	7	1	55	26	Automatically qualified			
(United States) 2023	Quarterfinals	6th	3	2	34	17	Automatically qualified			
(Puerto Rico) (United States) 2026	Quarterfinals	7th	3	2	21	15	Automatically qualified			
Total	Runners-up	6/6	26	13	196	111				

=== Olympic Games ===
Summer Olympics record							Qualification record
Year	Round	Position	W	L	RS	RA	Method
(South Korea) 1988	Finals	3rd (Note: Medals won did not count in the medal table, baseball was a demonstration sport in 1988)	3	2	19	18	1987 Pan American Games
(Spain) 1992	Preliminary	5th	2	5	22	48	1991 Pan American Games
(United States) 1996	Did not qualify						1995 Pan American Games
(Australia) 2000	Did not qualify						Did not participate
(Greece) 2004	Did not qualify						2004 Americas Olympic Baseball Qualifying Tournament
(China) 2008	Did not qualify						American Qualifying Tournament
(Japan) 2020	Did not qualify						Americas Qualifying Event
(United States) 2028	Did not qualify						2026 World Baseball Classic
Total (Note: Totals only include years 1992 to 2008, during which baseball was an official medal sport.)	Preliminary	1/7	2	5	22	48	

=== WBSC Premier12 ===
WBSC Premier12 record
Year	Result	Position	Pld	W	L	RS	RA	Ranking
(Taiwan) 2015	Quarterfinals	8th	6	2	4	31	35	9th
(Taiwan) 2019	Opening Round	10th	3	0	3	2	17	11th
(Mexico) 2024	Opening Round	11th	5	1	4	19	36	12th
2027	To be determined							7th
Total	Quarterfinals	3/3	14	3	11	52	88	

Baseball World Cup

- Gold: 1951
- Silver: 1947, 1948, 1973, 1976
- Bronze: 1952, 1965, 1970, 1973

Intercontinental Cup

- Silver: 1973
- Bronze: 1989

Americas Baseball Cup

- Gold: 2008

Pan American Games

- Gold: 2019
- Silver: 1959, 1991
- Bronze: 1967, 1979, 1987, 1995

Central American and Caribbean Games

- Gold: 1959, 2002, 2018
- Silver: 1962, 1966, 1990
- Bronze: 1974, 1978, 1993

Caribbean Baseball Cup

- Gold: 2022

World University Baseball Championship

- 2006 – 6th place

Haarlem Baseball Week

- 1992 – 5th place
- 2012 –

== Managers ==
Manager	Nat.	Years active	Competitions	Ref.
José "Pepe" Seda	(Puerto Rico)	1938–1952	1938 Central American and Caribbean Games — 4th place 1951 Amateur World Series — Champions; 1952 Amateur World Series — 3rd place	
Oscar Gandía	(Puerto Rico)	1940	1940 Amateur World Series — 7th place	
Jorge De Jesús	(Puerto Rico)	1941	1941 Amateur World Series — 8th place	
Manolo García	(Puerto Rico)	1944	1944 Amateur World Series — 7th place	
César "Coca" González	(Puerto Rico)	1945–1950	1947 Amateur World Series — Runners-up; 1948 Amateur World Series – Runners-up; 1950 Amateur World Series — Withdrew	
Monchile Concepción	(Puerto Rico)	1953	1953 Amateur World Series — 6th place	
Miguel Ángel Rivera	(Puerto Rico)	1959	1959 Central American and Caribbean Games — Champions; 1959 Pan American Games — Runners-up	
Carlos Negrón	(Puerto Rico)	1962	1962 Central American and Caribbean Games — 3rd place	
Tony Meléndez	(Puerto Rico)	1965–1982	1965 Amateur World Series — 3rd place 1966 Central American and Caribbean Games — Runners-up; 1970 Amateur World Series — 3rd place 1976 Amateur World Series — Runners-up; 1982 Central American and Caribbean Games — 7th place	
Ariel Torres	(Puerto Rico)	1969	1969 Amateur World Series — 5th place	
Víctor 'Vitín' Meléndez	(Puerto Rico)	1971	1971 Amateur World Series — 4th place	
Roberto Clemente	(Puerto Rico)	1972	1972 Amateur World Series — 6th place	
Junior Báez	(Puerto Rico)	1973	1973 FEMBA Amateur World Series — 3rd place	
Víctor Pellot	(Puerto Rico)	1973	1973 FIBA Amateur World Series — Runners-up; 1974 Central American and Caribbean Games — 3rd place	
José "Ronquito" García	(Puerto Rico)	1978	1978 Central American and Caribbean Games — 3rd place 1979 Pan American Games — 3rd place	
José Rafael Santiago	(Puerto Rico)	1980	1980 Amateur World Series — 10th place	
Saturnino Escalera	(Puerto Rico)	1984	1984 Amateur World Series — 8th place	
José Carradero	(Puerto Rico)	1985–2005	1985 Copa Simón Bolívar — Runners-up; 1986 Amateur World Series – 8th place 1988 Baseball World Cup – 6th 1988 Summer Olympics — 3rd place 1990 Goodwill Games – 5th place 1990 Baseball World Cup – 4th place 1990 Central American and Caribbean Games — Runners-up; 1991 Pan American Games — Runners-up; 1992 Summer Olympics — 5th place 1994 Baseball World Cup – Group stage 1998 Central American and Caribbean Games — 6th place 2002 Central American and Caribbean Games — Champions; 2005 Baseball World Cup – 8th place	
Santos Alomar	(Puerto Rico)	2003		
José Oquendo	(Puerto Rico)	2006–2009	2006 World Baseball Classic; 2009 World Baseball Classic	
Adalberto Peña	(Puerto Rico)	2006	2006 Central American and Caribbean Games — 8th place	
Efraín García	(Puerto Rico)	2007–2008	ALBA Games	
Eduardo Pérez	(United States)	2009–2010	2009 Baseball World Cup – 4th place 2010 Central American and Caribbean Games — 4th place	
José David Flores	(Puerto Rico)	2011	2011 Baseball World Cup – 9th place 2011 Pan American Games — 7rd place 2012 Haarlem Baseball Week – Runners-up	
Edwin Rodríguez	(Puerto Rico)	2013–2017	2013 World Baseball Classic; 2017 World Baseball Classic	
Yadier Molina	(Puerto Rico)	2013–2017	2023 World Baseball Classic; 2026 World Baseball Classic	

== Uniforms & Logos ==
Jersey Logo

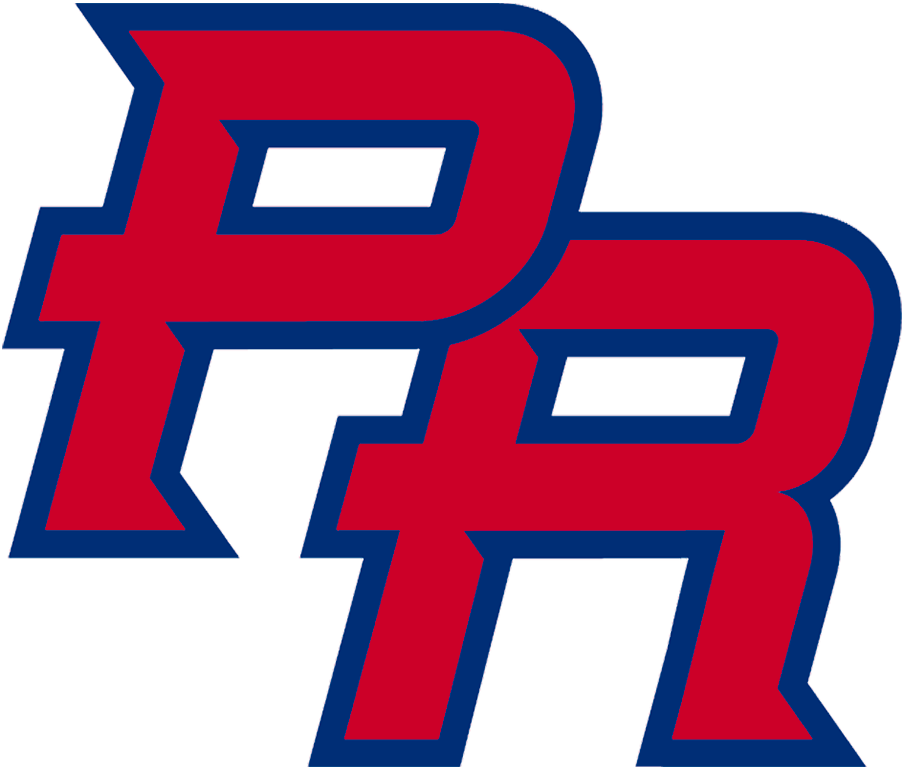
Cap Logo

2006 WBC		2009 WBC		2013 WBC	
Home	Away	Home	Away	Home	Away

2017 WBC		2023 WBC			2026 WBC	
Home	Away	Home	Away	Alternate	Home	Away

== See also ==
- Baseball in Puerto Rico
- World Baseball Classic
- Olympic baseball
- World Cup
- Americas Baseball Cup
- Pan American Games
- Intercontinental Cup
- Central American and Caribbean Games
- IBAF World Rankings
- List of players from Puerto Rico in MLB
- Baseball awards
- 2013 World Baseball Classic rosters
- 2009 World Baseball Classic rosters
- 2006 World Baseball Classic rosters

== Bibliography ==
- Uriarte González, Carlos (2014). La Doble A en Puerto Rico: 1940 a 2013, Vol. 1. Editorial Deportiva CAIN. ISBN 9780983626367.
