= Baseball at the 1950 Central American and Caribbean Games =

- Venue: Estadio Enrique Trapo Torrebiarte
- Competitors: 153 from 8 nations
- Teams: 8

Medalists
gold medal	Cuba
silver medal	Mexico
bronze medal	Nicaragua

Baseball was contested at the 1950 Central American and Caribbean Games in Guatemala City, Guatemala. All games were played at Estadio Enrique Trapo Torrebiarte, then known as Campo Minerva.

== Participating nations ==
A total of seven countries participated.

- Costa Rica (20)
- Colombia (19)
- Cuba (17)
- El Salvador (20)
- Guatemala (20)
- Honduras (18)
- Mexico (19)
- Nicaragua (20)

== Venue ==
Guatemala City	Baseball at the 1950 Central American and Caribbean Games is located in Guatemala
Estadio Enrique Trapo Torrebiarte	Baseball at the 1950 Central American and Caribbean Games is located in Guatemala

== Medalists ==
Event	Gold	Silver	Bronze
Men's baseball	Cuba (CUB)	Mexico (MEX)	Nicaragua (NCA)

== Round robin ==
Pos	Team	Pld	W	L	RF	RA	RD	PCT	GB
1	Cuba	7	7	0	72	12	+60	1.000	—
2	Mexico	7	6	1	38	20	+18	.857	1
3	Nicaragua	7	4	3	48	29	+19	.571	3
4	Colombia	7	4	3	35	18	+17	.571	3
5	Costa Rica	7	3	4	30	23	+7	.429	4
6	El Salvador	7	2	5	26	62	−36	.286	5
7	Guatemala (H)	7	1	6	5	44	−39	.143	6
8	Honduras	7	1	6	15	61	−46	.143	6

Source: Comité Organizador de los Séptimos Juegos Dеportivos Centroamericanos y del Caribe
(H) Hosts
