= 2012 15U Baseball World Championship =

Tournament details
- Country: Mexico
- Dates: 16 August – 26 August
- Teams: 15

Final positions
- Champions: Venezuela (1st title)
- Runners-up: Cuba
- Third place: Chinese Taipei

Tournament statistics
- Games played: 46
- Attendance: 44,599 (970 per game)
- Best BA: (Mexico) Conrado Diaz (.591)
- Most HRs: (Venezuela) Greifer Andrade (Venezuela) Nestor Tejada (2)
- Most SBs: (Brazil) Lucas Sakay (11)
- Best ERA: (Venezuela) Ulises Perez (Cuba) Luis Ramos (0.00)
- Most Ks (as pitcher): (Indonesia) Muhammad Fauzan (29)

Awards
- MVP: (Venezuela) Ricardo Sánchez

The 2012 15U Baseball World Championship was the first under-15 international baseball competition held in Chihuahua, Mexico, from August 16 to August 26, 2012.

== Teams ==
The tournament was slated to include 16 teams from across the world as three groups have been formed. After Colombia and Uganda withdrew from the competition, IBAF swapped Honduras and Argentina. Due to the non-appearance of Bahamas, the organizers updated the schedule.

Group A	Group B	Group C
Chinese Taipei^{1}	Argentina	Aruba
Honduras	Brazil	Germany
Italy	Cuba	Nicaragua
Lithuania	Hong Kong	Ukraine
Mexico	Indonesia	Venezuela

^1 Chinese Taipei is the official IBAF designation for the team representing the state officially referred to as the Republic of China, more commonly known as Taiwan. (See also political status of Taiwan for details.)

== Round 1 ==
=== Group A ===
==== Standings ====
Teams	W	L	Pct.	GB	R	RA
Chinese Taipei	4	0	1.000	–	59	6
Mexico	3	1	.750	1	81	7
Honduras	2	2	.500	2	26	35
Italy	1	3	.250	3	24	58
Lithuania	0	4	.000	4	9	93

==== Schedule ====
August 16, 2012	Honduras	12–2 (F/7)	Lithuania	Chihuahua, Chihuahua; Attendance: 40
August 16, 2012		Boxscore		Chihuahua, Chihuahua; Attendance: 40

August 17, 2012	Italy	17–7	Lithuania	Chihuahua, Chihuahua; Attendance: 150
August 17, 2012		Boxscore		Chihuahua, Chihuahua; Attendance: 150

August 17, 2012	Chinese Taipei	14–0 (F/7)	Honduras	Chihuahua, Chihuahua; Attendance: 250
August 17, 2012		Boxscore		Chihuahua, Chihuahua; Attendance: 250

August 17, 2012	Lithuania	0–44 (F/5)	Mexico	Chihuahua, Chihuahua; Attendance: 2,000
August 17, 2012		Boxscore		Chihuahua, Chihuahua; Attendance: 2,000

August 18, 2012	Italy	2–19 (F/7)	Chinese Taipei	Chihuahua, Chihuahua; Attendance: 1,000
August 18, 2012		Boxscore		Chihuahua, Chihuahua; Attendance: 1,000

August 18, 2012	Mexico	14–1 (F/7)	Honduras	Chihuahua, Chihuahua; Attendance: 400
August 18, 2012		Boxscore		Chihuahua, Chihuahua; Attendance: 400

August 19, 2012	Honduras	13–5	Italy	Chihuahua, Chihuahua; Attendance: 700
August 19, 2012		Boxscore		Chihuahua, Chihuahua; Attendance: 700

August 19, 2012	Mexico	4–6	Chinese Taipei	Chihuahua, Chihuahua; Attendance: 9,000
August 19, 2012		Boxscore		Chihuahua, Chihuahua; Attendance: 9,000

August 20, 2012	Chinese Taipei	20–0 (F/4)	Lithuania	Chihuahua, Chihuahua; Attendance: 100
August 20, 2012		Boxscore		Chihuahua, Chihuahua; Attendance: 100

August 20, 2012	Mexico	19–0 (F/5)	Italy	Chihuahua, Chihuahua; Attendance: 3,000
August 20, 2012		Boxscore		Chihuahua, Chihuahua; Attendance: 3,000

=== Group B ===
==== Standings ====
Teams	W	L	Pct.	GB	R	RA
Cuba	4	0	1.000	–	80	5
Brazil	3	1	.750	1	59	22
Argentina	2	2	.500	2	32	39
Hong Kong	1	3	.250	3	15	67
Indonesia	0	4	.000	4	4	57

==== Schedule ====
August 16, 2012	Indonesia	0–21 (F/7)	Brazil	Parral, Chihuahua; Attendance: 150
August 16, 2012		Boxscore		Parral, Chihuahua; Attendance: 150

August 16, 2012	Cuba	31–4 (F/5)	Hong Kong	Parral, Chihuahua; Attendance: 150
August 16, 2012		Boxscore		Parral, Chihuahua; Attendance: 150

August 17, 2012	Indonesia	0–24 (F/5)	Cuba	Parral, Chihuahua; Attendance: 150
August 17, 2012		Boxscore		Parral, Chihuahua; Attendance: 150

August 17, 2012	Hong Kong	8–18 (F/8)	Argentina	Parral, Chihuahua; Attendance: 200
August 17, 2012		Boxscore		Parral, Chihuahua; Attendance: 200

August 18, 2012	Brazil	16–0 (F/5)	Hong Kong	Parral, Chihuahua; Attendance: 150
August 18, 2012		Boxscore		Parral, Chihuahua; Attendance: 150

August 19, 2012	Argentina	9–2	Indonesia	Parral, Chihuahua; Attendance: 100
August 19, 2012		Boxscore		Parral, Chihuahua; Attendance: 100

August 19, 2012	Brazil	0–18 (F/5)	Cuba	Parral, Chihuahua; Attendance: 250
August 19, 2012		Boxscore		Parral, Chihuahua; Attendance: 250

August 19, 2012	Cuba	7–1 (F/5)	Argentina	Parral, Chihuahua; Attendance: 252
August 19, 2012		Boxscore		Parral, Chihuahua; Attendance: 252

August 20, 2012	Argentina	4–22 (F/6)	Brazil	Parral, Chihuahua; Attendance: 200
August 20, 2012		Boxscore		Parral, Chihuahua; Attendance: 200

August 20, 2012	Hong Kong	3–2 (F/8)	Indonesia	Parral, Chihuahua; Attendance: 180
August 20, 2012		Boxscore		Parral, Chihuahua; Attendance: 180

=== Group C ===
==== Standings ====
Teams	W	L	Pct.	GB	R	RA
Venezuela	4	0	1.000	–	65	7
Nicaragua	3	1	.750	1	43	15
Aruba	2	2	.500	2	28	53
Germany	1	3	.250	3	21	40
Ukraine	0	4	.000	4	10	52

==== Schedule ====
August 16, 2012	Ukraine	1–16 (F/7)	Nicaragua	Ciudad Cuauhtémoc, Chihuahua; Attendance: 300
August 16, 2012		Boxscore		Ciudad Cuauhtémoc, Chihuahua; Attendance: 300

August 16, 2012	Germany	6–18 (F/7)	Aruba	Ciudad Cuauhtémoc, Chihuahua; Attendance: 80
August 16, 2012		Boxscore		Ciudad Cuauhtémoc, Chihuahua; Attendance: 80

August 17, 2012	Nicaragua	5–4	Germany	Ciudad Cuauhtémoc, Chihuahua; Attendance: 250
August 17, 2012		Boxscore		Ciudad Cuauhtémoc, Chihuahua; Attendance: 250

August 17, 2012	Venezuela	15–0 (F/5)	Ukraine	Ciudad Cuauhtémoc, Chihuahua; Attendance: 250
August 17, 2012		Boxscore		Ciudad Cuauhtémoc, Chihuahua; Attendance: 250

August 18, 2012	Aruba	0–15 (F/5)	Nicaragua	Ciudad Cuauhtémoc, Chihuahua; Attendance: 133
August 18, 2012		Boxscore		Ciudad Cuauhtémoc, Chihuahua; Attendance: 133

August 18, 2012	Germany	0–16 (F/5)	Venezuela	Ciudad Cuauhtémoc, Chihuahua; Attendance: 250
August 18, 2012		Boxscore		Ciudad Cuauhtémoc, Chihuahua; Attendance: 250

August 19, 2012	Ukraine	1–11 (F/7)	Germany	Ciudad Cuauhtémoc, Chihuahua; Attendance: 150
August 19, 2012		Boxscore		Ciudad Cuauhtémoc, Chihuahua; Attendance: 150

August 19, 2012	Venezuela	24–0 (F/4)	Aruba	Ciudad Cuauhtémoc, Chihuahua; Attendance: 308
August 19, 2012		Boxscore		Ciudad Cuauhtémoc, Chihuahua; Attendance: 308

August 20, 2012	Nicaragua	7–10	Venezuela	Ciudad Cuauhtémoc, Chihuahua; Attendance: 506
August 20, 2012		Boxscore		Ciudad Cuauhtémoc, Chihuahua; Attendance: 506

August 20, 2012	Aruba	10–8	Ukraine	Ciudad Cuauhtémoc, Chihuahua
August 20, 2012		Boxscore		Ciudad Cuauhtémoc, Chihuahua

== Round 2 ==
=== Group 1 ===
==== Standings ====
Teams	W	L	Pct.	GB	R	RA	Tiebreaker 1	Tiebreaker 2
Cuba	5	0	1.000	–	52	15		
Venezuela	3	2	.600	2	49	26	1-1	8 RA
Mexico	3	2	.600	2	50	22	1-1	10 RA
Chinese Taipei	3	2	.600	2	32	37	1-1	24 RA
Brazil	1	4	.200	4	13	63		
Nicaragua	0	5	.000	5	27	60		

==== Schedule ====
August 22, 2012	Cuba	14–4 (F/7)	Nicaragua	Chihuahua, Chihuahua; Attendance: 100
August 22, 2012		Boxscore		Chihuahua, Chihuahua; Attendance: 100

August 22, 2012	Chinese Taipei	2–20 (F/7)	Venezuela	Chihuahua, Chihuahua; Attendance: 200
August 22, 2012		Boxscore		Chihuahua, Chihuahua; Attendance: 200

August 22, 2012	Mexico	19–2 (F/6)	Brazil	Chihuahua, Chihuahua; Attendance: 3,500
August 22, 2012		Boxscore		Chihuahua, Chihuahua; Attendance: 3,500

August 23, 2012	Cuba	3–1	Chinese Taipei	Chihuahua, Chihuahua; Attendance: 250
August 23, 2012		Boxscore		Chihuahua, Chihuahua; Attendance: 250

August 23, 2012	Brazil	7–6	Nicaragua	Chihuahua, Chihuahua; Attendance: 500
August 23, 2012		Boxscore		Chihuahua, Chihuahua; Attendance: 500

August 23, 2012	Venezuela	4–6	Mexico	Chihuahua, Chihuahua; Attendance: 5,000
August 23, 2012		Boxscore		Chihuahua, Chihuahua; Attendance: 5,000

August 24, 2012	Chinese Taipei	10–4	Brazil	Chihuahua, Chihuahua
August 24, 2012		Boxscore		Chihuahua, Chihuahua

August 24, 2012	Venezuela	5–11	Cuba	Chihuahua, Chihuahua; Attendance: 1,500
August 24, 2012		Boxscore		Chihuahua, Chihuahua; Attendance: 1,500

August 24, 2012	Nicaragua	4–16 (F/7)	Mexico	Chihuahua, Chihuahua; Attendance: 2,000
August 24, 2012		Boxscore		Chihuahua, Chihuahua; Attendance: 2,000

August 25, 2012	Venezuela	10–0 (F/7)	Brazil	Chihuahua, Chihuahua; Attendance: 200
August 25, 2012		Boxscore		Chihuahua, Chihuahua; Attendance: 200

August 25, 2012	Chinese Taipei	13–6	Nicaragua	Chihuahua, Chihuahua; Attendance: 200
August 25, 2012		Boxscore		Chihuahua, Chihuahua; Attendance: 200

August 25, 2012	Cuba	6–5	Mexico	Chihuahua, Chihuahua; Attendance: 10,500
August 25, 2012		Boxscore		Chihuahua, Chihuahua; Attendance: 10,500

=== Group 2 ===
==== Standings ====
Teams	W	L	Pct.	GB	R	RA	Tiebreaker 1
Honduras	5	0	1.000	–	64	18	
Argentina	3	2	.600	2	62	45	
Aruba	2	2	.500	2.5	38	41	
Italy	2	3	.400	3	55	49	1-0
Germany	2	3	.400	3	48	60	0-1
Hong Kong	0	4	.000	4.5	18	72	

==== Schedule ====
August 22, 2012	Aruba	9-8	Italy	Parral, Chihuahua; Attendance: 110
August 22, 2012		Boxscore		Parral, Chihuahua; Attendance: 110

August 22, 2012	Hong Kong	3–20 (F/5)	Germany	Parral, Chihuahua; Attendance: 200
August 22, 2012		Boxscore		Parral, Chihuahua; Attendance: 200

August 22, 2012	Honduras	9-3	Argentina	Parral, Chihuahua; Attendance: 220
August 22, 2012		Boxscore		Parral, Chihuahua; Attendance: 220

August 23, 2012	Italy	17-5 (F/7)	Hong Kong	Parral, Chihuahua; Attendance: 120
August 23, 2012		Boxscore		Parral, Chihuahua; Attendance: 120

August 23, 2012	Argentina	9-13	Germany	Parral, Chihuahua; Attendance: 200
August 23, 2012		Boxscore		Parral, Chihuahua; Attendance: 200

August 23, 2012	Aruba	5-11	Honduras	Parral, Chihuahua; Attendance: 200
August 23, 2012		Boxscore		Parral, Chihuahua; Attendance: 200

August 24, 2012	Germany	6-16	Italy	Parral, Chihuahua; Attendance: 100
August 24, 2012		Boxscore		Parral, Chihuahua; Attendance: 100

August 24, 2012	Honduras	17-2 (F/6)	Hong Kong	Parral, Chihuahua; Attendance: 70
August 24, 2012		Boxscore		Parral, Chihuahua; Attendance: 70

August 24, 2012	Argentina	16-6 (F/7)	Aruba	Parral, Chihuahua; Attendance: 120
August 24, 2012		Boxscore		Parral, Chihuahua; Attendance: 120

August 25, 2012	Honduras	14-3 (F/7)	Germany	Parral, Chihuahua; Attendance: 133
August 25, 2012		Boxscore		Parral, Chihuahua; Attendance: 133

August 25, 2012	Argentina	12-9 (F/7)	Italy	Parral, Chihuahua; Attendance: 283
August 25, 2012		Boxscore		Parral, Chihuahua; Attendance: 283

=== Group 3 ===
==== Standings ====
Teams	W	L	Pct.	GB	R	RA
Ukraine	3	1	.750	–	26	23
Lithuania	2	2	.500	1	44	35
Indonesia	1	3	.250	2	31	43

==== Schedule ====
August 22, 2012	Lithuania	19-9 (F/8)	Indonesia	Ciudad Cuauhtémoc, Chihuahua; Attendance: 50
August 22, 2012		Boxscore		Ciudad Cuauhtémoc, Chihuahua; Attendance: 50

August 22, 2012	Indonesia	6-2	Ukraine	Ciudad Cuauhtémoc, Chihuahua; Attendance: 50
August 22, 2012		Boxscore		Ciudad Cuauhtémoc, Chihuahua; Attendance: 50

August 23, 2012	Lithuania	7-9	Ukraine	Ciudad Cuauhtémoc, Chihuahua; Attendance: 100
August 23, 2012		Boxscore		Ciudad Cuauhtémoc, Chihuahua; Attendance: 100

August 23, 2012	Ukraine	8-6	Indonesia	Ciudad Cuauhtémoc, Chihuahua; Attendance: 100
August 23, 2012		Boxscore		Ciudad Cuauhtémoc, Chihuahua; Attendance: 100

August 24, 2012	Indonesia	10-14 (F/10)	Lithuania	Ciudad Cuauhtémoc, Chihuahua; Attendance: 55
August 24, 2012		Boxscore		Ciudad Cuauhtémoc, Chihuahua; Attendance: 55

August 24, 2012	Ukraine	7-4	Lithuania	Ciudad Cuauhtémoc, Chihuahua; Attendance: 95
August 24, 2012		Boxscore		Ciudad Cuauhtémoc, Chihuahua; Attendance: 95

== Finals ==
=== 5th place game ===
August 26, 2012	Brazil	9-7	Nicaragua	Chihuahua, Chihuahua; Attendance: 30
August 26, 2012		Boxscore		Chihuahua, Chihuahua; Attendance: 30

=== 3rd place game ===
August 26, 2012	Chinese Taipei	6-1	Mexico	Chihuahua, Chihuahua; Attendance: 3551
August 26, 2012		Boxscore		Chihuahua, Chihuahua; Attendance: 3551

=== Championship ===
August 26, 2012	Cuba	2-10	Venezuela	Chihuahua, Chihuahua; Attendance: 5000
August 26, 2012		Boxscore		Chihuahua, Chihuahua; Attendance: 5000
