= Totter =

Totter may refer to:

== People with the surname Totter ==
- Audrey Totter (1917–2013), American actress
- Stephen Totter (born 1963), American operatic baritone
- Sylvia Totter, a member of The Bonnie Systers trio

== Other uses ==
- Totter, an alternative term for a Rag-and-bone man
