= Baseball at the 1987 Pan American Games – Men's tournament =

Baseball – Men's tournament at the 1987 Pan American Games
- Venue: Bush Stadium
- Competitors: 166 from 8 nations

Medalists
Gold medal	Cuba
Silver medal	United States
Bronze medal	Puerto Rico

The men's baseball tournament at the 1987 Pan American Games in Indianapolis, United States was held at Bush Stadium. The eight teams in the tournament all teams played each other in a round-robin preliminary round, then the top four teams advanced to the semifinals.

Cuba were the defending champions from the 1983 Pan American Games in Caracas and won the tournament, after losing one game in the preliminary round.

== Results ==
=== Preliminary round ===
Pos	Team	Pld	W	L	RF	RA	RD	PCT	GB	Qualification
1	United States	7	7	0	81	20	+61	1.000	—	Advance to the semifinals
2	Cuba	7	6	1	75	15	+60	.857	1	Advance to the semifinals
3	Puerto Rico	7	5	2	51	21	+30	.714	2	Advance to the semifinals
4	Canada	7	4	3	61	55	+6	.571	3	Advance to the semifinals
5	Nicaragua	7	3	4	33	58	−25	.429	4	
6	Aruba	7	1	6	20	78	−58	.143	6	
7	Venezuela	7	1	6	39	64	−25	.143	6	
8	Netherlands Antilles	7	1	6	21	70	−49	.143	6	

United States	10–6	Canada	Bush Stadium

Cuba	12–1 (F/7)	Netherlands Antilles	Bush Stadium

Puerto Rico	10–0 (F/8)	Aruba	Bush Stadium

Nicaragua	5–0	Netherlands Antilles	Bush Stadium

Canada	8–4	Venezuela	Bush Stadium

Cuba	1–0	Puerto Rico	Bush Stadium

Netherlands Antilles	12–2 (F/8)	Aruba	Bush Stadium

Canada	3–5	Nicaragua	Bush Stadium

United States	14–7	Venezuela	Bush Stadium

Puerto Rico	10–0 (F/7)	Netherlands Antilles	Bush Stadium

United States	18–0 (F/7)	Nicaragua	Bush Stadium

Cuba	13–2 (F/7)	Aruba	Bush Stadium

Cuba	13–1 (F/7)	Venezuela	Bush Stadium

United States	14–1 (F/7)	Netherlands Antilles	Bush Stadium

Canada	7–4	Aruba	Bush Stadium

United States	6–4	Cuba	Bush Stadium

Puerto Rico	8–4	Nicaragua	Bush Stadium

Aruba	10–9	Venezuela	Bush Stadium

Puerto Rico	11–2	Venezuela	Bush Stadium

Cuba	17–1 (F/7)	Nicaragua	Bush Stadium

Canada	16–5 (F/7)	Netherlands Antilles	Bush Stadium

Puerto Rico	12–10	Canada	Bush Stadium

United States	15–2	Aruba	Bush Stadium

Nicaragua	6–5	Venezuela	Bush Stadium

Cuba	15–4 (F/7)	Canada	Bush Stadium

Venezuela	11–2	Netherlands Antilles	Bush Stadium

Nicaragua	12–0 (F/7)	Aruba	Bush Stadium

United States	4–0 (F/11)	Puerto Rico	Bush Stadium

=== Medal round ===
Semifinals
Cuba	6
Puerto Rico	5
United States	7
Canada	6

Gold medal
Cuba	13
United States	9
Bronze medal
Puerto Rico	12
Canada	2

==== Semifinals ====
Cuba	6–5	Puerto Rico	Bush Stadium

United States	7–6	Canada	Bush Stadium

==== Bronze medal match ====
(bronze) Puerto Rico	12–2	Canada	Bush Stadium

==== Gold medal match ====
(gold) Cuba	13–9	United States (silver)	Bush Stadium

1987 Pan American Games winners

Cuba
7th title

== Final standings ==
Rank	Team	Record
Gold medal	Cuba	8–1
Silver medal	United States	8–1
Bronze medal	Puerto Rico	6–3
4	Canada	4–5
5	Nicaragua	3–4
6	Aruba	1–6
7	Venezuela	1–6
8	Netherlands Antilles	1–6
