= Baseball at the Central American Games =

The Central American Games were the first international tournament to feature baseball as a medal event, doing so in 1926 and 1930. The event then became the Central American and Caribbean Games, but another version of the Central American Games was established in 1973 with baseball returning in 1977.

== Results ==
Year	Final Host	Medalists			
Year	Final Host	Gold	Silver	Bronze	
1977	(El Salvador); San Salvador	Nicaragua	Panama	El Salvador	
1986	Guatemala City	Nicaragua	Costa Rica	Honduras	
1990	(Honduras); Tegucigalpa	El Salvador	Nicaragua	Honduras	
1994	(El Salvador); San Salvador	Nicaragua	Guatemala	Honduras	
1997	(Honduras); San Pedro Sula	Panama	Nicaragua	Honduras	
2001	Guatemala City	Nicaragua	Guatemala	El Salvador	
2006	(Nicaragua); Managua	Nicaragua	Guatemala	Honduras	
2010	Panama City	Panama	Nicaragua	Costa Rica	
2013	(Costa Rica); San Jose	Nicaragua	Panama	El Salvador	
2017	(Nicaragua); Managua	Nicaragua	Panama	El Salvador	Guatemala
2025	Guatemala City	Nicaragua	Costa Rica	Honduras	

== Medal table ==
Rank	Nation	Gold	Silver	Bronze	Total
1	Nicaragua (NIC)	8	3	0	11
2	Panama (PAN)	2	3	0	5
3	El Salvador (ESA)	1	0	4	5
4	Guatemala (GUA)	0	3	1	4
5	Costa Rica (CRC)	0	2	1	3
6	Honduras (HON)	0	0	6	6
Totals (6 entries)		11	11	12	34
