= 1951 Amateur World Series =

Tournament details
- Country: Mexico
- Teams: 11

Final positions
- Champions: Puerto Rico
- Runners-up: Venezuela
- Third place: Cuba
- Fourth place: Dominican Republic

The 1951 Amateur World Series was the twelfth Amateur World Series (AWS), an international men's amateur baseball tournament. The tournament was sanctioned by the International Baseball Federation (which titled it the Baseball World Cup as of the 1988 tournament). The tournament took place, for the only time, in Mexico, played at Parque Delta in Mexico City from November 1 to 19. It was won by Puerto Rico, marking the country's first victory in world championship.

== Participants ==
Puerto Rico was managed by José "Pepe" Seda. The team included future major leaguers Ramón Conde and Félix Mantilla in the infield. Most of the players were young, with an average age of 19, and only one (Melquiades Silva) had previously played in international competition. The Puerto Rican team which had previously played at the 1950 tournament had been disqualified and many of its players barred from international competition due to allegations of professionalism.

== Tournament summary ==
Cuba fared well in the preliminary round, going 9-1 with a one-run loss to Puerto Rico. Venezuela also was 9-1, followed by Puerto Rico (7-3) and the Dominican Republic (7-3). Failing to advance to round two were Nicaragua (6-4), Costa Rica (5-5), Panama (5-5), Colombia (4-6), Mexico (2-8), Guatemala (1-9), and El Salvador (0-10).

In the final round, Puerto Rico went 3-0 to win the gold medal. Venezuela claimed the silver with a 2-1 mark, while Cuba was a disappointing 1-2; both losses were by 7-6 scores. The Dominican Republic was 0-3 in the medal round.

Bert Bradford of Nicaragua led the tourney with a .481 average and 25 hits, while the Dominicans had the top home run threat, Walter James, with 3. Puerto Rico's Sotero Ortiz led in runs (21) and stolen bases (10) while teammate Ramon Maldonado hit 8 doubles, the most.

== Final standings ==
Place	Team
Gold	Puerto Rico
Silver	Venezuela
Bronze	Cuba
4	Dominican Republic
5	Nicaragua
6	Costa Rica
7	Panama
8	Colombia
9	Mexico
10	Guatemala
11	El Salvador

1951 Amateur World Series champions

Puerto Rico
First title
