= Mike Fetters =

American baseball player and coach (born 1964)

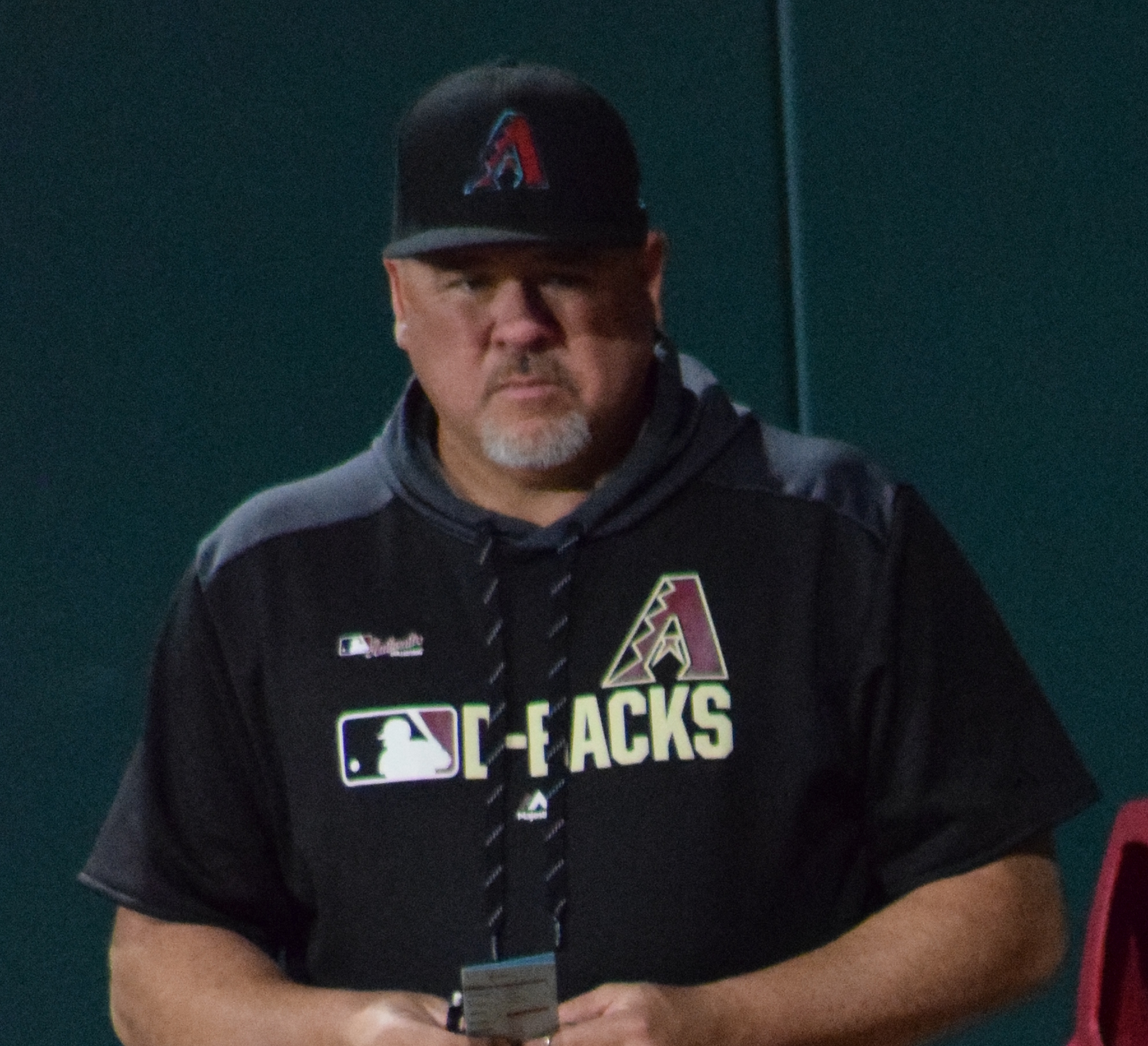
- Fetters with the Arizona Diamondbacks in 2019
- Pitcher / Coach
- Born: December 19, 1964 (age 61); Van Nuys, California, U.S.
- Batted: Right Threw: Right

MLB debut
- September 1, 1989, for the California Angels

Last MLB appearance
- September 16, 2004, for the Arizona Diamondbacks

MLB statistics
- Win–loss record: 31–41
- Earned run average: 3.86
- Strikeouts: 518
- Stats at Baseball Reference

Teams
- As player: California Angels (1989–1991); Milwaukee Brewers (1992–1997); Oakland Athletics (1998); Anaheim Angels (1998); Baltimore Orioles (1999); Los Angeles Dodgers (2000–2001); Pittsburgh Pirates (2001–2002); Arizona Diamondbacks (2002); Minnesota Twins (2003); Arizona Diamondbacks (2004); As coach: Arizona Diamondbacks (2012–2024)

Career highlights and awards
- Milwaukee Brewers Wall of Honor
Medals
Representing United States
Men's baseball
Pan American Championship
Bronze medal – third place	1985 Caracas	Team

Michael Lee Fetters (born December 19, 1964) is an American former professional baseball pitcher and coach. He played in Major League Baseball (MLB) for eight teams during his 16–year career from 1989 to 2004. Fetters started his playing career with the California Angels and also played for the Milwaukee Brewers, Oakland Athletics, Baltimore Orioles, Los Angeles Dodgers, Pittsburgh Pirates, the Diamondbacks, and Minnesota Twins. Fetters had his best season in 1996 when he finished fifth in the American League in saves with 32 with the Brewers. Fetters finished his career with 100 saves.

== Playing career ==
Fetters is a graduate of ʻIolani School, where he played high school baseball in the early 1980s, in Honolulu, Hawaii.

Fetters played baseball at Pepperdine University and was drafted in the first round of the 1986 Major League Draft by the California Angels.

== Coaching career ==
Beginning in the 2019 season, Fetters worked as the Arizona Diamondbacks' bullpen coach, having spent the four previous years as a quality control coach. On October 3, 2024, Fetters was fired by the Diamondbacks.

On July 2, 2026, Fetters was announced as the bullpen coach for the National League at the All-Star Futures Game.

== Personal life ==
Fetters is half-Caucasian and half-Samoan in ancestry.

Fetters is a cousin of American baritone Stephen Totter.
