= Ricardo Sánchez (baseball) =

Venezuelan baseball player (born 1997)

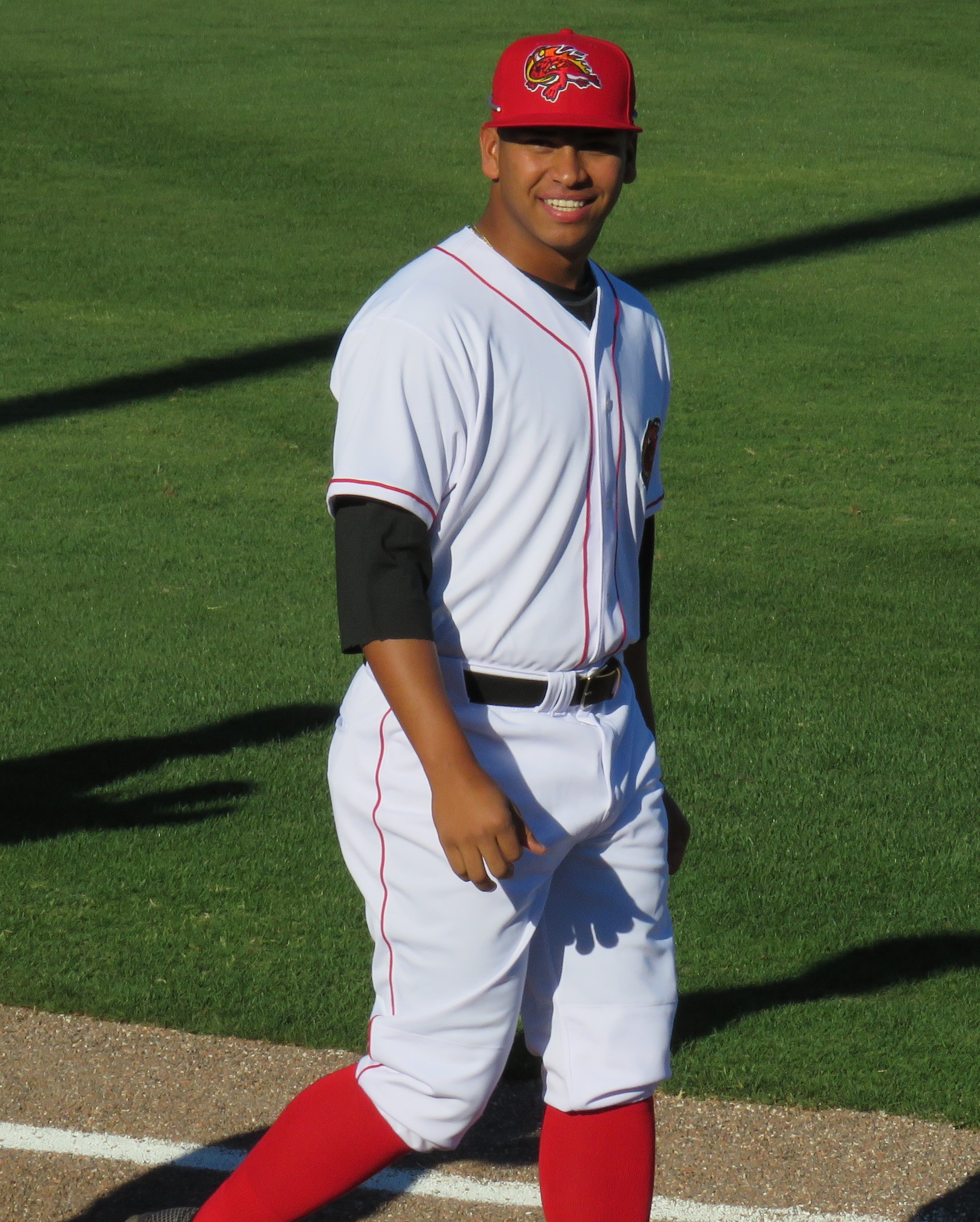
- Sánchez with the Florida Fire Frogs in 2017

Algodoneros de Unión Laguna – No. 57
- Pitcher
- Born: April 11, 1997 (age 29); Puerto Cabello, Venezuela
- Bats: Left Throws: Left

Professional debut
- MLB: August 17, 2020, for the St. Louis Cardinals
- KBO: May 11, 2023, for the Hanwha Eagles

MLB statistics (through 2020 season)
- Win–loss record: 0–0
- Earned run average: 6.75
- Strikeouts: 4

KBO statistics (through 2024 season)
- Win–loss record: 9–11
- Earned run average: 3.91
- Strikeouts: 155
- Stats at Baseball Reference

Teams
- St. Louis Cardinals (2020); Hanwha Eagles (2023–2024)
Medals
Men's baseball
Representing Venezuela
World Baseball Classic
Gold medal – first place	2026 Miami	Team
15U Baseball World Championship
Gold medal – first place	2012 Chihuahua	Team

Ricardo José Sánchez Lugo (born April 11, 1997) is a Venezuelan professional baseball pitcher for the Algodoneros de Unión Laguna of the Mexican League. He has previously played in Major League Baseball (MLB) for the St. Louis Cardinals and in the KBO League for the Hanwha Eagles.

== Career ==
=== Amateur career ===
Sánchez was named the most valuable player of the 2012 15U Baseball World Championship in Mexico. He pitched six innings in the championship game against a Cuban team led by Yordan Alvarez to earn the win over opposing starting pitcher Johan Oviedo.

=== Los Angeles Angels ===
Sánchez signed with the Los Angeles Angels as an international free agent on July 2, 2013. He made his professional debut in 2014 with the rookie-level Arizona League Angels and spent the whole season there, going 2–2 with a 3.49 ERA and 43 strikeouts in 12 games (nine starts).

=== Atlanta Braves ===
On January 8, 2015, the Angels traded Sánchez to the Atlanta Braves in exchange for Kyle Kubitza and Nate Hyatt. In 2015, Sánchez played for the Single-A Rome Braves where he was 1–6 with a 5.45 ERA and 31 strikeouts in ten starts, and in 2016, he returned to Rome, going 7–10 with a 4.75 ERA and 103 strikeouts in 24 games (23 starts). He spent 2017 with the High-A Florida Fire Frogs where he compiled a 4–12 record with a 4.95 ERA and 101 strikeouts across 22 appearances (21 starts).

The Braves added Sánchez to their 40-man roster after the 2017 season, in order to protect him from the Rule 5 draft. He spent 2018 with the Double-A Mississippi Braves, going 2–5 with a 4.06 ERA with 57 strikeouts in 13 starts.

=== Seattle Mariners ===
The Seattle Mariners acquired Sánchez in exchange for cash considerations on November 28, 2018. Upon joining the organization, Sánchez was considered by MLB.com to be the Mariners' 23rd-ranked prospect. Sánchez was assigned to the Double-A Arkansas Travelers at the start of the 2019 season. In 27 starts for Arkansas, he compiled an 8-12 record and 4.44 ERA with 135 strikeouts across 146 innings pitched. Sánchez was designated for assignment following the signing of Yoshihisa Hirano on January 30, 2020.

=== St. Louis Cardinals ===
On February 6, 2020, Sánchez was claimed off waivers by the St. Louis Cardinals. On July 4, it was announced that Sánchez had tested positive for COVID-19. On August 15, Sánchez was promoted to the major leagues. He made his major league debut the next day against the Chicago Cubs, pitching two scoreless innings. On October 20, Sánchez was outrighted off of the 40-man roster. He became a free agent on November 2.

On April 30, 2021, Sánchez re-signed with the Cardinals. He did not play in a game in 2021 due to injury. On March 30, 2022, Sánchez was released by the Cardinals organization.

=== Philadelphia Phillies ===
On April 1, 2022, Sánchez signed a minor league contract with the Philadelphia Phillies organization. He made 21 starts for the Triple-A Lehigh Valley IronPigs, pitching to a 6–4 record and 4.79 ERA with 83 strikeouts in 92.0 innings of work.

=== Detroit Tigers ===
On August 14, 2022, the Phillies traded Sánchez to the Detroit Tigers for cash considerations. Sánchez closed out the year starting 5 games for the Triple-A Toledo Mud Hens, working to a 1–1 record and 5.55 ERA with 20 strikeouts in 24 1/3 innings pitched. He was released on October 27.

=== Chicago White Sox ===
On February 23, 2023, Sánchez signed a minor league contract with the Chicago White Sox organization. He made 3 appearances for the Triple-A Charlotte Knights, allowing 4 runs on 8 hits with 8 strikeouts in 6 2/3 innings pitched.

=== Hanwha Eagles ===
On April 19, 2023, Sanchez signed a $400k contract with the Hanwha Eagles of the Korea Baseball Organization. In 24 starts for the Eagles, he recorded a 7–8 record and 3.79 ERA with 99 strikeouts across 126.0 innings of work.

On December 26, 2023, Sánchez re–signed with Hanwha on a one–year, $750,000 contract. On June 16, 2024, he was declared inactive due to elbow pains, and was temporarily replaced by Ryan Weiss. Sánchez made 11 total appearances for Hanwha in 2024, logging a 2-3 record and 4.22 ERA with 56 strikeouts across 53 1/3 innings pitched. He became a free agent following the season.

=== Algodoneros de Unión Laguna ===
On May 3, 2025, Sánchez signed with the Algodoneros de Unión Laguna of the Mexican League. In 14 starts 65.1 innings he went 3-4 with a 6.06 ERA with 51 strikeouts.
