= Baseball at the 1959 Central American and Caribbean Games =

- Location: Caracas
- Dates: 6-18 January

The 1959 Central American and Caribbean Games were held in Caracas, Venezuela from January 6 through January 18, 1959. Cuba could not come as the Cuban revolution was going on.

Puerto Rico won their first Central American and Caribbean Games Gold in baseball; it would be 43 years until the second. They went 7-1 and then beat Venezuela in the finale. J.E. Marrero and R. Paulino each went 2-0 while P. Perez had a 0.00 ERA.

Venezuela also went 7-1 in the round-robin before falling to Puerto Rico in the finals. Pablo Higuery and J. Perez each had a 2-0 mark. M. Mendible led the Games with 13 runs.

Panama claimed Bronze with a 4-4 record. L. Sanjur hit .500 to lead all hitters, while F. Sanchez had the most RBI (11). F. Castilleros went 2-0.

Mexico placed fourth at 2-6.

Netherlands Antilles was winless in their 8 games to bring up the rear.

== Final standing ==
Place	Team
Gold	Puerto Rico
Silver	Venezuela
Bronze	Panama
4	Mexico
5	Netherlands Antilles

1959 Central American and Caribbean Baseball champions

Puerto Rico
First title

- This article includes material from the article at Baseball-Reference.com Bullpen. The Bullpen is a wiki, and its content is available under the GNU Free Documentation License.
