= Elio Chacón =

Venezuelan baseball player (1936–1992)

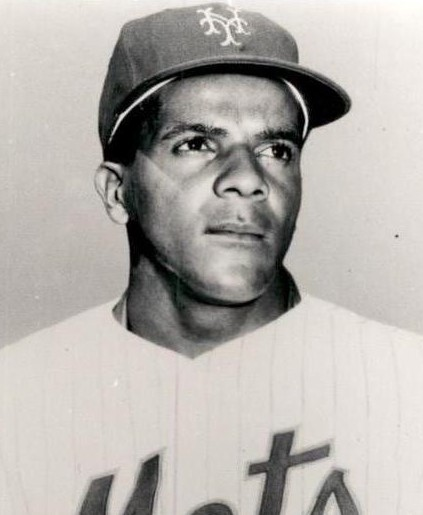
- Second baseman
- Born: October 26, 1936; Caracas, Venezuela
- Died: April 24, 1992 (aged 55); Caracas, Venezuela
- Batted: Right Threw: Right

MLB debut
- April 20, 1960, for the Cincinnati Reds

Last MLB appearance
- September 30, 1962, for the New York Mets

MLB statistics
- Batting average: .232
- Home runs: 4
- Runs batted in: 39
- Stats at Baseball Reference

Teams
- Cincinnati Reds (1960–1961); New York Mets (1962)
Medals
Men's baseball
Representing Venezuela
Pan American Games
Bronze medal – third place	1955 Mexico City	Team

Elio Chacón Rodríguez (October 26, 1936 – April 24, 1992) was a Venezuelan Major League Baseball second baseman and shortstop who played in the National League from 1960 to 1962. The son of Cuban Negro leaguer Pelayo Chacón, he was the seventh baseball player from Venezuela to play in the majors.

== Playing career ==
Born in Caracas, Chacón was listed as 5 feet 9 inches (1.75 m) tall and 160 pounds (73 kg). He threw and batted right-handed. Chacón hit .265 as a reserve second baseman with the 1961 NL champion Cincinnati Reds, starting 34 games during the season. In Game 2 of the 1961 World Series, Chacón hit a key bloop single against New York Yankees pitcher Ralph Terry, and scored the winning run in the Reds' only victory in the series.

Immediately after the World Series, on October 10, the 1961 MLB expansion draft to stock the newborn Houston Colt .45s and New York Mets was conducted in Cincinnati. After he was selected by New York with the fourth overall pick during the draft's regular phase, Chacón was the Mets' first candidate for the 1962 starting shortstop job. In a May 28 game, Chacón got into a fight with Willie Mays. Chacón was ejected from the game.

=== '¡La tengo!' ===
During the 1962 season, New York Mets center fielder Richie Ashburn and Chacón frequently found themselves colliding in the outfield. When Ashburn went for a catch, he would scream, "I got it! I got it!" only to run into the 160-pound Chacón, who spoke only Spanish. Ashburn learned to yell, "¡La tengo! ¡La tengo!" which is "I've got it" in Spanish. In a later game, Ashburn happily saw Chacón backing off. He relaxed, positioned himself to catch the ball, and was instead run over by 200-pound left fielder Frank Thomas, who understood no Spanish and had missed a team meeting that proposed using the words "¡La tengo!" as a way to avoid outfield collisions. After getting up, Thomas asked Ashburn, "What the hell is a Yellow Tango?". The band Yo La Tengo gets its name from this baseball anecdote.

== Statistics ==
Chacón led the Mets in stolen bases in their inaugural season of 1962, but then never appeared in the major leagues again. His professional career continued through 1971. In the majors, he was a .232 career hitter with 143 hits, four home runs, 28 RBI, 49 runs, and 20 stolen bases in 228 games played.

In his native Venezuela, played in the LVBP with the Industriales de Valencia (1955–1959), Licoreros de Pampero (1959–1962), Tiburones de La Guaira (1962–1967), Tigres de Aragua (1967–1970), and Águilas del Zulia (1970–1973). His best season was in 1961–62 with Pampero, where he hit .303 with 34 walks and 11 stolen bases. Over the course of his 17 winter league seasons, he posted a .261 batting average with 655 hits and 447 walks

== Death ==
Chacón died in Caracas, at the age of 55.

== See also ==
- List of players from Venezuela in Major League Baseball
