= Baseball at the 2002 Central American and Caribbean Games =

- Location: San Salvador

The 2002 Central American and Caribbean Games were held in San Salvador, El Salvador from 27 November through 7 December 2002. The defending champion Cuban national baseball team did not come, citing security concerns.

Puerto Rico won its second Gold for baseball in a Central American and Caribbean Games, both of which came when Cuba skipped the event.

Panama claimed Silver.

Dominican Republic won Bronze.

Nicaragua was 4th at 4-3.

Mexico (3-4), Netherlands Antilles (2-5), El Salvador (2-4), Venezuela (3-3), Honduras (0-4) and Guatemala (0-4) completed the pack.

== Final standing ==
Place	Team
Gold	Puerto Rico
Silver	Panama
Bronze	Dominican Republic
4	Nicaragua
5	Mexico
6	Netherlands Antilles
7	El Salvador
8	Venezuela
9	Honduras and Guatemala

2002 Central American and Caribbean Baseball champions

Puerto Rico
Second title
