= Frank Barnes (right-handed pitcher) =

American baseball player (1926–2014)

- Pitcher
- Born: August 26, 1926; Longwood, Mississippi, U.S.
- Died: October 19, 2014 (aged 88); Greenville, Mississippi, U.S.
- Batted: Right Threw: Right

Professional debut
- NgL: 1949, for the Kansas City Monarchs
- MLB: September 22, 1957, for the St. Louis Cardinals

Last MLB appearance
- May 14, 1960, for the St. Louis Cardinals

MLB statistics
- Win–loss record: 1–3
- Earned run average: 5.89
- Strikeouts: 30
- Stats at Baseball Reference

Teams
- Kansas City Monarchs (1949–1950); St. Louis Cardinals (1957–1958, 1960)

Frank Barnes (August 26, 1926 – October 19, 2014) was an American professional baseball pitcher and occasional pinch runner who played three seasons for the St. Louis Cardinals of Major League Baseball (MLB). Barnes pitched another sixteen seasons starting with the Indianapolis Clowns of the Negro leagues at age 18 in 1947 and ending in the Mexican League in 1967.

== Career ==
Born in Longwood, Mississippi, Barnes was acquired by the New York Yankees from the Kansas City Monarchs in 1950. He was sold to the Yankees along with Elston Howard. Howard later became the first African-American member of the Yankees. Barnes' rights were sent by the Yankees to the St. Louis Browns during the 1951 season. Before the 1953 season, the Browns returned him to the Toronto Maple Leafs after expiration of minor league working agreement. After the 1956 season he was traded by Toronto to the St. Louis Cardinals for Jim Pearce, cash and a player to be named later, which turned out to be Rocky Nelson. He played in the Major Leagues for the Cardinals in 1957, 1958, and 1960. On May 19, 1960, the Chicago White Sox purchased Barnes from the St. Louis Cardinals. After the 1961 season, he was traded by the White Sox with Andy Carey to the Philadelphia Phillies for Bob Sadowski and Taylor Phillips. However, Carey refused to report to his new team before the 1962 season. Thus, to complete the trade the White Sox sent Cal McLish to Philadelphia and the Phillies sent a minor leaguer to Chicago. During the 1950s, he played in the Eastern League, Texas League and American Association in Minor League Baseball.

After his Major League Baseball career Barnes played in the Mexican Summer League, Liga Mexicana de Beisbol. In 1965, where he led the circuit in both winning percentage 13–5, .722 and in earned run average at 1.58.

Additionally, Barnes played winter ball for the Licoreros de Pampero club of the Venezuelan Professional Baseball League during the 1955–1956 season. He also played in the Dominican Republic's league with Tigres del Licey and Estrellas Orientales in from 1953 to 1959.

== Statistics ==
In 1957, Barnes led the American Association with a 2.41 ERA for the Omaha Cardinals before being called up to St. Louis in September. He also led the league with six shutouts and pitched a record-setting 41 1/3 consecutive scoreless innings. On August 4, 1958, he pitched the first no-hitter in Omaha Cardinal American Association history. It was not the first no-hitter for Barnes who had pitched one for the Oklahoma City of the Texas League in 1955.

Barnes posted a 1–3 record with one save over the course of three seasons with the Cardinals. He accumulated 30 strikeouts in 36 2/3 innings pitched. During his career, Barnes scored three runs despite only having one hit in ten career at bats and having no walks, no hit by pitches and one caught stealing. Also, over the course of his career he had a 2.84 ERA in games on the road, but only a 9.17 ERA at home in Sportsman's Park. Barnes appeared as a pinch runner several times in 1957 and 1958.

== See also ==
- List of Negro league baseball players who played in Major League Baseball
