= José Seda =

Puerto Rican baseball manager (born 1905)

- Manager
- Born: December 1, 1905; Coamo, Puerto Rico
Medals
Men's baseball
Manager for Puerto Rico
Amateur World Series
Gold medal – first place	1951 Mexico City	Team
Bronze medal – third place	1952 Havana	Team

José Seda Santiago (December 1, 1905 – death date unknown), known as Pepe Seda, was a Puerto Rican baseball manager and scout. He was the first manager of the Puerto Rico national baseball team and in the early years of the island's professional winter league.

== Career ==
Seda was born on December 1, 1905 in Coamo. He played amateur baseball with the Coamo Star club and went on to study at the Colegio de Agricultura y Artes Mecánicas in Mayagüez; he continued his pedagogical studies at New York University. In the mid-1930s, he also appeared as a third baseman for the Guayama club, alongside figures such as Gacho Torres and Enrique Lantigua.

With the advent of professional baseball on the island, Seda became a player-manager for Caguas. He managed the team to a national championship in the 1940–41 season, defeated the Santurce in seven games with a roster including Luis Rodríguez Olmo, Roy Campanella, and Bill Byrd. He went on to play with Santurce. After his retirement as a player, he became a manager of the San Juan club, leading it to a championship in the 1945–46 season along with Robert Clarke.

Seda managed the first national team to represent Puerto Rico, at the 1938 Central American and Caribbean Games in Panama City; Negro leaguers Juan Guilbe and Jose Antonio Figueroa were both on the team, with Millito Navarro serving as assistant coach. The team tied with Panama and Nicaragua for second place, but lost both tie-breaker games and ended the tournament in fourth. He returned to helm the national team at the 1951 Amateur World Series in Mexico City, leading Puerto Rico to its first world championship in baseball.

For decades, Seda served as a Major League Baseball scout in Puerto Rico, first with the Brooklyn Dodgers under Branch Rickey. He recommended Brooklyn sign Luis Olmo in 1940 (though his contract would not be purchased until 1942). He later worked for the Pittsburgh Pirates organization and then for the New York Yankees. While with the Yankees, he reportedly offered Juan Marichal a $2,500 contract in 1956, but failed to sign him.

Seda, a mentor of Roberto Clemente, was director of the Ciudad Deportivo Roberto Clemente in Carolina for several years. He was inducted into the Puerto Rican Sports Hall of Fame and, in 1995, the Rio Piedras Sports Hall of Fame.

== Bibliography ==
- Uriarte González, Carlos (2014). La Doble A en Puerto Rico: 1940 a 2013, Vol. 2. Editorial Deportiva CAIN. ISBN 9780983626367.
