= Tom Silverio =

Dominican baseball player (1945–2011)

- Outfielder
- Born: October 14, 1945; Santiago, Dominican Republic
- Died: April 2, 2011 (aged 65); Santiago, Dominican Republic
- Batted: Left Threw: Left

MLB debut
- April 30, 1970, for the California Angels

Last MLB appearance
- May 15, 1972, for the California Angels

MLB statistics
- Batting average: .100
- Hits: 3
- Stats at Baseball Reference

Teams
- California Angels (1970–1972)
Medals
Men's baseball
Representing Dominican Republic
Central American and Caribbean Games
Gold medal – first place	1962 Kingston	Team

Tomás Roberto Silverio Veloz (October 14, 1945 – April 2, 2011) was a Dominican professional baseball player who had a 17-year career in organized baseball. The outfielder and native of Santiago de los Caballeros appeared in 31 games played over parts of three Major League Baseball seasons for the California Angels from 1970 to 1972. He threw and batted left-handed and was listed as 5 feet 10 inches (1.78 m) tall and 170 pounds (77 kg).

Silvero entered professional baseball in the Angels' system in 1965 and batted over .300 twice in the Triple-A Pacific Coast League. However, he scuffled at the plate during his three trials with the Angels, collecting only three hits (all off them singles) in 30 at bats, with two bases on balls and four strikeouts. He appeared in ten games in the outfield, but started only one (on April 19, 1972, against the Minnesota Twins at Anaheim Stadium). After eight years in the Angels' organization, Silverio played another nine seasons in the Triple-A Mexican League, retiring after the 1981 campaign.

His son, Nelson, was a coach in the New York Mets' farm system in 2004.
