= Baseball at the 1955 Pan American Games =

- Venue: Parque Deportivo del Seguro Social
- Dates: 13 – 24 March
- Competitors: 5 teams

Medalists
| Gold medal | Dominican Republic |
| Silver medal | United States |
| Bronze medal | Venezuela |

Baseball at the 1955 Pan American Games was contested between five national teams representing the Dominican Republic, Mexico, Netherlands Antilles, United States, and Venezuela in the second edition of the Pan American Games, held in Mexico City. The tournament was played from 13 to 24 March in the Parque Deportivo del Seguro Social.

Dominican Republic finished first with a 6–2 record, winning the gold medal. United States finished second with a 5–3 record, winning the gold medal. Venezuela and Mexico both finished third with a 4–4 record and had to play a tiebreaker game, where the Venezuelan team defeated Mexico 8–2 to claim the bronze medal.

== Medal summary ==
=== Medal table ===
| Rank | Nation | Gold | Silver | Bronze | Total |
|---|---|---|---|---|---|
| 1 | Dominican Republic | 1 | 0 | 0 | 1 |
| 2 | United States | 0 | 1 | 0 | 1 |
| 3 | Venezuela | 0 | 0 | 1 | 1 |
| Totals (3 entries) | | 1 | 1 | 1 | 3 |

=== Medalists ===
| Event | Gold | Silver | Bronze |
|---|---|---|---|
| Men's | Dominican Republic: Rafael Quezada; Manuel Valdespino; Domingo Vargas; Miguel Marcelino; Pedro Pablo Tineo; Carlos Dore; Fabio Fiallo; Manuel Infante; Felipe Rojas Alou; José A. Capellán; Julián Javier; Roy Donald; Atilano Domínguez; Teodoro Rodríguez; Rafael Andújar; Wilfredo Echevarría; Luis Henríquez | United States: Paul Ebert; Arlan Barber; Bill Lore; Bob Jingling; Carl Thomas; Jerry Schoonmaker; James Temp; Don Lukaszewski; Vince Magi; Lamont Geiger; Raymond Hyde; Kenneth DeCarlo; John Garten; William Cary; Jerry Cloutier; Bob Schnorbus; Louis Scarborough | Venezuela: Francisco Cirimeli; Antonio Martínez; Manuel Fernández; Jaime Barroso; José Matos; Eladio Reverón; Rubén Millán; Jorge Aquiles Gómez; Argenis Gil; Pedro Gómez; Elio Chacón; José Garrido; Emiro Alvarez; Carlos Loreto; Julio Pirela; Luis Angel González; Francisco López; Andrés Quintero |

== Results ==
| Pos | Team | Pld | W | L | RF | RA | RD | PCT | GB | DOM | USA | VEN | MEX | ANT | DOM | USA | VEN | MEX | ANT |
|---|---|---|---|---|---|---|---|---|---|---|---|---|---|---|---|---|---|---|---|
| 1 | Dominican Republic | 8 | 6 | 2 | 71 | 53 | +18 | .750 | — | | 5–6 | 4–3 | 8–7 | 15–6 | | 10–7 | 10–8 | 6–8 | 13–8 |
| 2 | United States | 8 | 5 | 3 | 77 | 51 | +26 | .625 | 1 | 6–5 | | 2–8 | 5–1 | 12–7 | 7–10 | | 13–2 | 5–12 | 27–6 |
| 3 | Venezuela | 8 | 4 | 4 | 64 | 44 | +20 | .500 (Note: Venezuela defeated Mexico 8–2 in a tiebreaker game to determine the bronze medal winner.) | 2 | 3–4 | 8–2 | | 3–5 | 19–3 | 8–10 | 2–13 | | 11–4 | 10–3 |
| 4 | Mexico (H) | 8 | 4 | 4 | 51 | 52 | −1 | .500 | 2 | 7–8 | 1–5 | 5–3 | | 7–3 | 8–6 | 12–5 | 4–11 | | 7–11 |
| 5 | Netherlands Antilles | 8 | 1 | 7 | 47 | 110 | −63 | .125 | 5 | 6–15 | 7–12 | 3–19 | 3–7 | | 8–13 | 6–27 | 3–10 | 11–7 | |

Source: Panam Sports
(H) Hosts

== Statistical leaders ==
=== Batting ===
| Statistic | Name | Total |
|---|---|---|
| Batting average | (Dominican Republic) Domingo Vargas | .471 |
| Hits | (Dominican Republic) Domingo Vargas | 16 |
| Runs | (United States) Bob Jingling | 11 |

=== Pitching ===
| Statistic | Name | Total |
|---|---|---|
| Earned runs allowed | (Mexico) Alfonso Barranca | 1.62 |
| Wins | (Mexico) Alfonso Barranca | 2 |
| Wins | (Mexico) Jacinto Cárdenas | 2 |
