= 1953 Amateur World Series =

International baseball tournament in Venezuela

Tournament details
- Country: Venezuela
- Teams: 10

Final positions
- Champions: Cuba
- Runners-up: Venezuela
- Third place: Nicaragua
- Fourth place: Dominican Republic

Awards
- MVP: (Venezuela) Andrés Quintero

The 1953 Amateur World Series was the 14th Amateur World Series and ended a run when one was held every year or every other year; it would be eight years until the Series was reinstituted. The 1953 Series was held in Caracas, Venezuela from September 12 through October 9, 1953.

== Final standings ==
Rk	Team	Record
1	Cuba	11–1
2	Venezuela	9–1
3	Nicaragua	7–3
4	Dominican Republic	7–3
5	Panama	5–5
6	Colombia	3–7
7	Guatemala	3–7
8	Mexico	3–7
9	Netherlands Antilles	2–8
10	El Salvador	1–9
