= Baseball at the 1954 Central American and Caribbean Games =

- Venue: Parque del Seguro Social
- Dates: 7 – 18 March 1954
- Competitors: 72 from 4 nations
- Teams: 4

Medalists
gold medal	Venezuela
silver medal	Mexico
bronze medal	Dominican Republic

Baseball was contested at the 1954 Central American and Caribbean Games in Mexico City, Mexico from 7 to 18 March 1954. All of the games were played at the Parque del Seguro Social.

The tournament was contested by four national teams in a round-robin format, with each team playing every other team twice. Venezuela finished first with a 5–1 record, winning the gold medal. Hosts Mexico finished second with a 4–2 record, winning the silver medal. Dominican Republic finished third with a 3–3 record, and were awarded the bronze medal. Nicaragua finished fourth, losing all their matches, for a 0–6 record.

== Participating nations ==
A total of seven countries participated.

- Dominican Republic (18)
- Mexico (18)
- Nicaragua (18)
- Venezuela (18)

== Medalists ==
Event	Gold	Silver	Bronze
Men's baseball	Venezuela (VEN); Emiro Álvarez; Erasmo Arizmendi; Guillermo Barráez; Primitivo Colina; Aquiles Gómez; Manuel González; Ángel Guillén; Carlos Loreto; José Matos; Rubén Millán; Andrés Quintero; Eladio Reverón; Blas Rodríguez; Darío Rubinstein; Pedro Sánchez; Aristóbulo Salcedo; Juan Tellería; Román Vilchez	Mexico (MEX); Rubén Amaro; Ramiro Caballero; José Cortés; Carlos Duarte; Manuel Estrada; Francisco García; Gilberto García; Rubén Huerta; Lorenzo Isidoro; Mario Lagunow; Rubén López; Raúl Mata; Justino Nieves; Román Ramos; Alfredo Ríos; Manuel Romero; Ramón Serratos; Ángel Somarriba	Dominican Republic (DOM); Andrés Aranda; José Capellán; Juan Castillo; Atilano Domínguez; Carlos Dore; Wilfredo Echavarría; Fabio Fiallo; Luis Gutiérrez; Manuel Infante; Víctor Marcelino; Guillermo Martínez; Rafael Quezada; Teodoro Rafael; Héctor Ravelo; Leopoldo Rodríguez; Pedro Tineo; Luis Vargas; Horacio Veras

== Round robin ==
Pos	Team	Pld	W	L	RF	RA	RD	PCT	GB
1	Venezuela	6	5	1	60	26	+34	.833	—
2	Mexico (H)	6	4	2	42	37	+5	.667	1
3	Dominican Republic	6	3	3	20	37	−17	.500	2
4	Nicaragua	6	0	6	21	43	−22	.000	5

Source: Comité Organizador de los Séptimos Juegos Dеportivos Centroamericanos y del Caribe
(H) Hosts

=== Results ===
Nicaragua	0 – 2	Dominican Republic	Parque del Seguro Social, Mexico City

Mexico	4 – 2	Venezuela	Parque del Seguro Social, Mexico City

Venezuela	11 – 0	Nicaragua	Parque del Seguro Social, Mexico City

Mexico	11 – 5	Dominican Republic	Parque del Seguro Social, Mexico City

Venezuela	7 – 2	Dominican Republic	Parque del Seguro Social, Mexico City

Mexico	9 – 5	Nicaragua	Parque del Seguro Social, Mexico City

Dominican Republic	1 – 11	Venezuela	Parque del Seguro Social, Mexico City

Nicaragua	3 – 4	Mexico	Parque del Seguro Social, Mexico City

Dominican Republic	3 – 2	Mexico	Parque del Seguro Social, Mexico City

Nicaragua	7 – 10	Venezuela	Parque del Seguro Social, Mexico City

Dominican Republic	7 – 6	Nicaragua	Parque del Seguro Social, Mexico City

Venezuela	19 – 12	Mexico	Parque del Seguro Social, Mexico City
