= Copa Simón Bolívar (baseball) =

Baseball tournament held in Caracas in 1985

Tournament details
- Country: Venezuela
- City: Caracas
- Venue(s): Estadio Universitario de Caracas
- Dates: October 5–15, 1985
- Teams: 8

Final positions
- Champions: Cuba
- Runners-up: Puerto Rico
- Third place: United States

Tournament statistics
- Games played: 18

The Copa Simón Bolívar was the name of the inaugural edition of the Pan American Amateur Baseball Championship (Spanish: Primer Campeonato Panamericano de Béisbol Aficionado; now known as the Copa América), which was held in Caracas, Venezuela from October 5 to 15, 1985. Nine countries participated in the tournament, which was a qualifier for the 1986 Amateur World Series, held in the Netherlands. Five spots from the Americas at the 1986 world championship were up for grabs; Cuba had already qualified by virtue of winning the 1984 Amateur World Series.

Games were played at the Estadio Universitario de Caracas and two other stadiums in Venezuela. The tournament was won by Cuba.

== Teams ==
Nine nations competed in the tournament. Mexico was invited, but ultimately did not send a team due to the effects of the 1985 Mexico City earthquake. Canada also did not attend, as they had just hosted the Intercontinental Cup in Edmonton earlier that year.

- Netherlands Antilles
- Colombia
- Cuba (holders)
- United States
- Nicaragua
- Panama
- Dominican Republic
- ~~Mexico~~ (did not attend)
- Venezuela (hosts)
- Puerto Rico

Nicaragua was managed by César Jarquín; the team went 2–5, with its sole victories against Puerto Rico national baseball team and Colombia.

The United States was managed by Duane Banks, head coach of the University of Iowa Hawkeyes; his assistants were Skip Bertman, of LSU, and Rich Alday, fresh off a JUCO World Series appearance with the Pima Aztecs. Andy Stankiewicz, Mike Fetters, and Darryl Hamilton were all on the team.

Hensley Meulens played with the Netherlands Antilles.
