= Baseball at the 1970 Central American and Caribbean Games =

Baseball was contested at the 1970 Central American and Caribbean Games in Panama City, Panama.

Event	Gold	Silver	Bronze
Men's baseball game	Cuba (CUB)	Dominican Republic (DOM)	Mexico (MEX)
