= Baseball at the 1962 Central American and Caribbean Games =

- Venue: Sabina Park
- Dates: 13 – 23 August 1962
- Nations: 6
- Teams: 6

Medalists
gold medal	Dominican Republic
silver medal	Mexico
bronze medal	Puerto Rico

Baseball was contested at the 1962 Central American and Caribbean Games in Kingston, Jamaica from 13 to 22 August 1962. All of the games were played at Sabina Park.

The tournament was contested by six national teams in a round robin format. Dominican Republic finished first with a 4–1 record, winning the gold medal. Mexico finished second with a 3–2 record, winning the silver medal; and Puerto Rico, also with a 3–2 record but having lost their match against Mexico, were awarded the bronze medal.

== Participating nations ==
A total of six countries participated. The number of athletes a nation entered is in parentheses beside the name of the country. Hosts Jamaica did not field a baseball team.

- Colombia (18)
- Cuba (24)
- Dominican Republic (21)
- Mexico (18)
- Puerto Rico (18)
- Venezuela (21)

== Venue ==
Kingston, Jamaica	Baseball at the 1962 Central American and Caribbean Games is located in Jamaica
Sabina Park	Baseball at the 1962 Central American and Caribbean Games is located in Jamaica

== Medalists ==
Event	Gold	Silver	Bronze
Men's baseball	Dominican Republic (DOM); Edmundo Borromé; Nazario Cruz; José Díaz; José Donastorg; Mario García; Juan García; Tomás Liriano; Eddy McKelly; Ramón Olakling; Nelson Pérez; Demetrio Reyes; Pedro Reynoso; Jaime Sención; Tomás Silverio; Gilberto Soriano; Marcos Soto; Rafael Suazo; Víctor Zapata	Mexico (MEX); Arnoldo Armenta; Santiago Beltrán; Arturo Casillas; Luis Esma; Luis García; Enrique Gastélum; Antonio León; Elías Mier; Arturo Navarro; Ernesto Palma; José Parcero; Rafael Rodríguez; Reynaldo Rodríguez; Miguel Tapia; Santiago Vázquez; Miguel Vega; Magdaleno Villanueva	Puerto Rico (PUR); Víctor Acevedo; Roberto Avilés; Iván Carradero; Pedro Correa; José Cotto; Irmo Figueroa; José Geigel; Emetrio Isaac; Ramón Jusino; Julio Lassaus; Ángel López; José Marrero; Pedro Meléndez; Ramón Ortiz; José Pacheco; José Santana; Ángel Ramos

== Round robin ==
Pos	Team	Pld	W	L	RF	RA	RD	PCT	GB
1	Dominican Republic	5	4	1	26	17	+9	.800	—
2	Mexico	5	3	2	12	16	−4	.600	1
3	Puerto Rico	5	3	2	28	11	+17	.600	1
4	Cuba	5	2	3	22	11	+11	.400	2
5	Venezuela	5	2	3	14	24	−10	.400	2
6	Colombia	5	1	4	7	30	−23	.200	3

Source: Centro Caribe Sports
