= Stephen Totter =

American opera singer (1963–2019)

Stephen Totter was an American operatic baritone.

He was known for his formidable stage presence combined with excellent diction and interpretation. Born on May 3, 1963, Totter earned both a Bachelors and master's degree in French horn performance from West Virginia University and Duquesne University respectively. While studying the horn he was dually active as a singer, earning the title role in Mozart's "The Marriage of Figaro" at the age of nineteen.

He performed the title role in the premiere recording of Leonardo Balada's Torquemada for baritone soloist, choir and orchestra. Totter's other roles include Papageno in Die Zauberflöte, Guglielmo in Così fan tutte, and Count Almaviva in Le nozze di Figaro. Totter was also known as an avid recitalist giving performances throughout the country and also as an orchestral soloist. Until his death, he was an artist-lecturer in voice at Carnegie Mellon University. Stephen had a sports connection as he was related to former major league relief pitcher Mike Fetters. They are first cousins. Totter died on May 25, 2019.
