= Copa América (baseball) =

Baseball tournament for national teams in the Americas

- Sport: Baseball
- Founded: 1985
- Continent: Americas
- Most recent champion: United States (2021) (2nd title)
- Most titles: Cuba (4 titles)

The Copa América (English: Americas Cup) is the top international baseball tournament contested among national teams from the Americas. Organized under the auspices of WBSC Americas (previously COPABE) under various names since 1985, including as the Pan American Championship (Spanish: Premundial Panamericano or Campeonato Panamericano), it has historically served as the qualifier for major international tournaments like the Olympics and the Pan American Games. The Pan American Championship was suspended after the cancellation of the Baseball World Cup in 2011, though the World Baseball Softball Confederation is reportedly planning on reviving the tournament under the Copa América name.

== Names and history ==
The Pan American Baseball Confederation (COPABE) was formed in 1984, during the International Baseball Federation (IBAF) congress in Cuba during the 1984 Amateur World Series. The first tournament, known as the Copa Simón Bolívar, was organized in 1985. Serving as a mid-tier international baseball event in the Americas organized by the IBAF (and since 2013, the World Baseball Softball Confederation), the tournament now known as the Copa América has since held been held on an irregular basis.

The 1998 Panamerican Championship served as a qualifier for the 1998 Baseball World Cup as well as the 1999 Pan American Games in Winnipeg, which themselves would serve as a qualifier for the 2000 Summer Olympics. The 2000 tournament served as a qualifier for the 2001 Baseball World Cup in Taiwan.

In 2002, the tournament was rebranded as the "Serie de las Américas" and acted as a qualifier for the 2003 Pan American Games in Santo Domingo. The 2003 tournament was a direct qualifier for the Athens Summer Olympics held the following year; the 2003 tournament became notorious after the United States national baseball team failed to qualify for the Olympics.

COPABE first rebranded the tournament as the Copa América in 2007, based on a proposal by the Venezuelan Baseball Federation, with the hope that turning it into a more formal event would encourage the participation of Major League Baseball players. The 2008 Copa América was held in Venezuela, with Puerto Rico taking the championship. However, despite talks of making the tournament a recurring event, it was not continued.

Despite the abandonment of the "Copa América" idea, the IBAF scheduled a Panamerican qualifier tournaments in 2010, which acted as a qualifier for the 2011 Pan American Games and the 2011 Baseball World Cup. Another qualifier event for the Baseball at the 2020 Summer Olympics was scheduled for the six American teams that did not qualify directly for the Olympics at the 2019 WBSC Premier12, as well as the top two finishers at the Pan American Games that did not participate in the Premier12. The event, initially scheduled to be held in March 2020 in Arizona, was postponed to May 2021 due to the COVID-19 pandemic.

=== Cancelled 2025 tournament ===
In November 2024, ESPN reported that the WBSC had approved a plan to revive the Copa América tournament, scheduled to be played from the 13th to the 22nd of November 2025 with the 12 best-ranked national teams in the Americas by WBSC World Rankings.

In May 2025, the WBSC confirmed the 12 teams would be the Dominican Republic, Venezuela, Panama, Colombia, Curaçao, Brazil in Group A, Mexico, Puerto Rico, Cuba, the USA, Nicaragua and Canada in Group B. The hosts were initially announced as Panama and Mexico, though Mexico later dropped out and was replaced by Venezuela; Venezuela was ultimately dropped as host due to geopolitical tensions, after the Dominican Republic considered withdrawing from the tournament.

In November 2025, just days before it was scheduled to commence, the tournament was cancelled. WBSC Americas blamed the cancellation on breach of contract by the tournament promoter in Panama, and said the games would be rescheduled.

== Results ==
Year	Host	Champions	Runners-up	3rd place
1985; Details	(Venezuela); Caracas	Cuba	Puerto Rico	United States
1998; Details	(Nicaragua); Managua	Panama	United States	Nicaragua
2000; Details	Panama City	Panama	Nicaragua	Dominican Republic
2002; Details	(Mexico); Saltillo and Monterrey	Cuba	United States	Dominican Republic
2003; Details	Panama City / Aguadulce	Cuba	Canada	Mexico
2004; Details	(Colombia); Cartagena / Barranquilla	Cuba	Colombia	Panama
2006; Details	(Cuba); Havana	United States	Cuba	Mexico
2008; Details	(Venezuela); Puerto Ordaz / El Tigre	Puerto Rico	Nicaragua	Mexico
2010; Details	(Puerto Rico); San Juan	Dominican Republic	Cuba	United States
2010; Details	(Puerto Rico); San Juan	Dominican Republic	Cuba	Venezuela
2021; Details	(United States); Port St. Lucie / West Palm Beach	United States	Dominican Republic	Venezuela

== Medal table ==
Rank	Nation	Gold	Silver	Bronze	Total
1	Cuba (CUB)	4	2	0	6
2	United States (USA)	2	2	2	6
3	Panama (PAN)	2	0	1	3
4	Dominican Republic (DOM)	1	1	2	4
5	Puerto Rico (PUR)	1	1	0	2
6	Nicaragua (NIC)	0	2	1	3
7	Canada (CAN)	0	1	0	1
7	Colombia (COL)	0	1	0	1
9	Mexico (MEX)	0	0	3	3
10	Venezuela (VEN)	0	0	2	2
Totals (10 entries)		10	10	11	31

== See also ==
- Baseball at the Pan American Games
