= Baseball at the 1974 Central American and Caribbean Games =

Baseball was contested at the 1974 Central American and Caribbean Games in Santo Domingo, the Dominican Republic.

Event	Gold	Silver	Bronze
Men's baseball	Cuba (CUB)	Dominican Republic (DOM)	Puerto Rico (PUR)
