= Baseball at the 1998 Central American and Caribbean Games =

- Venue: Estadio Luis Aparicio El Grande
- Location: Maracaibo, Venezuela

Baseball was contested at the 1998 Central American and Caribbean Games in Maracaibo, Venezuela.

Event	Gold	Silver	Bronze
Men's baseball	Cuba (CUB)	Nicaragua (NCA)	Venezuela (VEN)

== Participating nations ==
9 teams took part in baseball at the 1998 Central American and Caribbean Games.

- Colombia (18)
- Cuba (22)
- Dominican Republic (22)
- Netherlands Antilles (22)
- Nicaragua (22)
- Panama (22)
- Virgin Islands (22)
- Puerto Rico (22)
- Venezuela (22)
