= Aruba national baseball team =

Information
- Country: Aruba
- Federation: ABBA Aruba
- Confederation: WBSC Americas

WBSC ranking
- Current: 58 (26 March 2026)

The Aruba national baseball team is the national baseball team of Aruba. The team is organized by the Amateur Baseball Bond Aruba, which was founded in 1950.

Many Aruban players as well as players from other parts of the former Netherlands Antilles, including Curaçao and Sint Maartin, play for the Netherlands national team.

== See also ==
- Baseball in the Netherlands
