= Honduras national baseball team =

Information
- Country: Honduras
- Federation: Federación Hondureña de Béisbol
- Confederation: COPABE

WBSC ranking
- Current: 44 ▲2 (31 December 2025)

The Honduras national baseball team is the national baseball team of Honduras and is controlled by the Federación Hondureña de Béisbol. It represents the nation in senior-level men's international competition. The team is a member of the COPABE. Baseball is popular in Honduras, though Soccer or Football is Honduras' national sport

== Results ==
World Baseball Classic

- 2006-2009 : Not invited
- 2013-2026 : Not invited

Central American and Caribbean Games

- 1935: 6th
- 1950: 9th
- 2002: 9th

Central American Games

- 1986: (bronze) 3rd
- 1990: (bronze) 3rd
- 1994: (bronze) 3rd
- 1997: (bronze) 3rd
- 2001: 4th
- 2006: (bronze) 3rd
- 2017: 5th
- 2025: (bronze) 3rd
