= Costa Rica national baseball team =

Information
- Country: Costa Rica
- Federation: Costa Rican Amateur Baseball Federation
- Confederation: COPABE

WBSC ranking
- Current: 39 (31 December 2025)

The Costa Rica national baseball team is the national baseball team of Costa Rica. The team is controlled by the Costa Rican Amateur Baseball Federation, and represents the nation in international competitions. The team is a member of the Pan American Baseball Confederation.

== Placings ==
World Cup

- 1945 : 5th
- 1947 : 8th
- 1950 : 10th

Pan American Games

- 1959 : 6th
