= El Salvador national baseball team =

Information
- Country: El Salvador
- Confederation: COPABE

WBSC ranking
- Current: 54 ▲2 (31 December 2025)

Pan American Games
- Appearances: 1 (first in 1975)

The El Salvador national baseball team is a national team of El Salvador and is controlled by the Federación Salvadoreña de Béisbol. It represents the nation in senior-level men's international competition. The team is a member of the COPABE.

== Central American Games ==
- 1977 : (bronze) 3rd
- 1986 : Nil
- 1990 : (gold) 1st
- 1994 : Nil
- 1997 :
- 2001 : (bronze) 3rd
- 2006 :
- 2010 :
- 2013 : (bronze) 3rd
- 2017 : (bronze) 3rd

== List of Coaches ==
- Jorge Bahaia (1990)
- (Cuba) Germán Meza (August 2017 -)
- (Nicaragua) Jorge Luis Avellan (2023 - January 2025)
- (El Salvador) William Ponce (March 2025-Present)
