= Pelayo Chacón =

Cuban baseball player and manager (1888-1971)

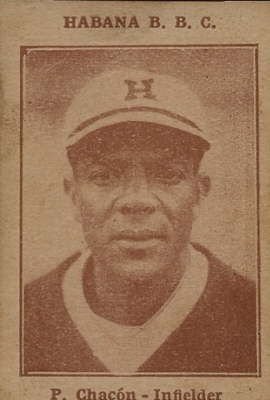
- Infielder / Right fielder / Manager
- Born: September 22, 1888; Havana, Cuba
- Died: March 11, 1971 (aged 82); Caracas, Venezuela
- Batted: Right Threw: Right

Negro leagues debut
- 1910, for the Stars of Cuba

Last Negro leagues appearance
- 1931, for the Stars of Cuba

Negro leagues (Note: On December 16, 2020, Major League Baseball declared the Negro leagues, from the span of 1920–1948, to be a "Major League". Chacón's statistics reflect his time in the major Negro leagues from 1923–1927.) statistics
- Batting average: .283
- Home runs: 0
- Runs batted in: 77
- Managerial record: 103–112
- Stats at Baseball Reference

Teams
- As player: Stars of Cuba / Cuban Stars of Havana / Cuban Stars (West) (1910–1916); New York Cuban Stars / Cuban Stars (East) / Stars of Cuba (1917–1931); Gilkerson's Union Giants (1928); As manager: Cuban Stars (East) (1923–1927)

Member of the Cuban

Baseball Hall of Fame
- Induction: 1949
Medals
Men's baseball
Manager for Colombia
Amateur World Series
Gold medal – first place	1947 Cartagena	Team
Silver medal – second place	1945 Caracas	Team
Central American and Caribbean Games
Gold medal – first place	1946 Barranquilla	Team
Bolivarian Games
Gold medal – first place	1947-48 Lima	Team

Andrés Pelayo Chacón Cortina (September 22, 1888 – March 11, 1971) was a Cuban professional baseball shortstop, first baseman, second baseman, right fielder and manager. He spent his American playing career in the Negro leagues, mostly with the Cuban Stars (East) of the Eastern Colored League, which he also managed from 1923 to 1927.

Outside of the negro leagues, Chacón was also active in the Cuban League and in Venezuela's amateur leagues. He managed the Colombia national baseball team in several international tournaments, including a world championship on home soil in 1947.

Nicknamed "Cortina" or "the Curtain", Chacón was elected to the Cuban Baseball Hall of Fame in 1949. In a 1952 player-voted poll by the Pittsburgh Courier, he was voted the fifth best all-time shortstop of the Negro leagues.

== Career ==
Chacón played from 1908 to 1932 with several clubs in the Cuban League, including Almendares, Azul, Club Fé, and Habana; he managed Cienfuegos to a championship in 1930. Over the course of his Cuban League career, he compiled 463 hits with a .246 batting average. He won the league batting title in the 1920–21 season, hitting .344.

In the Negro leagues, he played for both iterations of the Cuban Stars: the Western Stars, an independent team, from 1910 to 1916; and the Eastern Stars, which were a major league side (associated with the Eastern Colored League) from 1923 to 1929. Along with Horacio Martínez, he was rated as one of the best Hispanic shortstops in the Negro Leagues. For one season in 1928, Chacón played third base for Gilkerson's Union Giants.

In the 1930s, Chacón played in the Venezuelan first division with the "Caribe" club, alongside fellow Cuban Cocaína García. He managed Caribe to a division title in 1932, and Vargas to two more in 1937 and 1939.

Chacón managed the Colombia national baseball team throughout the 1940s. At the 1947 Amateur World Series, held in Cartagena, Colombia, he led the team to its first world championship.

Chacón's three sons, Elio, Armando y Pelayito, were all active baseball players in Venezuela. Elio Chacón was the seventh Venezuelan to play in Major League Baseball.
