= Enrique Lantigua =

Dominican baseball player (born 1910)

- Catcher / Left fielder
- Born: June 15, 1910; Santiago, Dominican Republic
- Died: June 29, 1985 (aged 75); Santo Domingo, Dominican Republic

Negro league baseball debut
- 1935, for the New York Cubans

Last appearance
- 1935, for the New York Cubans

Teams
- New York Cubans (1935)

Enrique Antonio Lantigua (June 15, 1910 – June 29, 1985), nicknamed El Mariscal, was a Dominican professional baseball catcher and left fielder who played in the Negro leagues in the 1930s.

A native of Santiago, Dominican Republic, Lantigua played for the New York Cubans of the second Negro National League in 1935. In six recorded games, he went hitless in 14 plate appearances.

Lantigua was the first manager of the Colombia national baseball team, helming the team at the 1938 Bolivarian Games. He went on to manage the Dominican Republic national baseball team to a world championship at the 1948 Amateur World Series in Managua, the country's first international title. He repeated the feat at the 1950 Amateur World Series, also in Nicaragua, though the victory would later be retroactively changed to second place after the International Baseball Federation disqualified Puerto Rico, giving Cuba the necessary points to earn the gold medal.

Lantigua founded the Dominican Professional Baseball Players Federation, which led to the reestablishment of a professional league on the island in 1951. He died in Santo Domingo, Dominican Republic in 1985 at age 75.
