= Pedro Miranda (baseball) =

Colombian baseball player (1922–2002)

- Shortstop
- Born: January 18, 1922; Cartagena, Colombia
- Died: October 22, 2002 (aged 80); Cartagena, Colombia
- Batted: Right Threw: Unknown
Medals
Representing Colombia
Men's baseball
Amateur World Series
Gold medal – first place	1947 Cartagena	Team
Silver medal – second place	1945 Caracas	Team
Central American and Caribbean Games
Gold medal – first place	1946 Barranquilla	Team
Bolivarian Games
Gold medal – first place	1947-48 Lima	Team
Silver medal – second place	1938 Bogotá	Team

Pedro Miranda (January 18, 1922 – October 22, 2002), nicknamed Chita, was a Colombian professional baseball player. He played on the Colombia national baseball team of the 1940s that won several regional and world championships, including the 1947 Amateur World Series.

Chita Miranda was considered one of the greatest right-handed hitters in Colombian baseball history. He mostly played with the Indios de Cartagena of the Colombian Professional Baseball League.

Miranda debuted with the Patriotas de Venezuela in the 1950–51 Venezuelan Professional Baseball League season, becoming the first Colombian to play in the league. He also played with Fieras del San Fernando of the Nicaraguan Professional Baseball League during the league's inaugural season in 1956. Miranda reportedly declined offers to sign with a Major League Baseball organization during his prime, saying he preferred to play in Colombia.

His nickname stemmed from Chita, the chimpanzee sidekick of Tarzan. Miranda died of cancer on October 22, 2002 in Cartagena.
