= Osvaldo Castellanos =

Cuban baseball manager

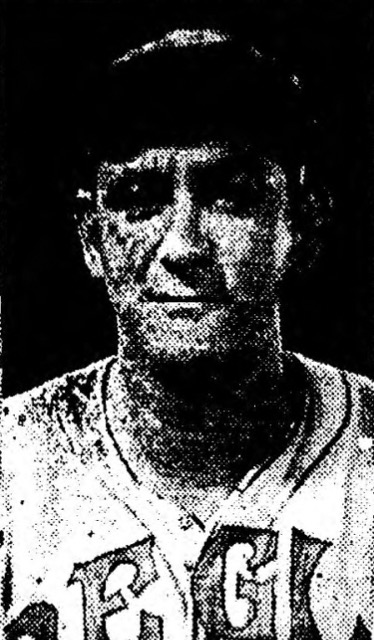
- Manager
- Born: c. 1919; Regla, Cuba
- Died: March 6, 1984 (aged 64–65); Coro, Falcón, Venezuela
Medals
Men's baseball
Manager for Cuba
Amateur World Series
Gold medal – first place	1953 Caracas	Team
Manager for Venezuela
Amateur World Series
Bronze medal – third place	1973 Havana	Team

Osvaldo Castellanos (c. 1919 — March 6, 1984) was a Cuban baseball player and manager. He managed the world champion Cuba national baseball team at the 1953 Amateur World Series in Caracas.

Castellanos played as a shortstop in the Cuban Amateur League, with the Rifleros de Regla and later with Cubaneleco. He took the role of Regla's manager in 1944, and went on to helm the team for several seasons. He never won a top-level amateur title with Regla, but managed the team to a second place finish in 1945 and four third place finishes. Before managing Regla, he won a pennant in the Campeonato Obrero, a minor amateur competition, with the Ruta 29 club. He mentored several prominent amateur players including a future Cuban National Series star Jorge Trigoura, as well as Rogelio Valdés.

Castellanos was first selected to coach the Cuba national baseball team for the 1946 Central American and Caribbean Games, held in Barranquilla, Colombia. However, he was ultimately replaced in the role by Víctor "Vitico" Muñoz. He finally managed Cuba at the 1953 Amateur World Series in Caracas, leading the team to a world championship.

After his appearance at the 1953 series, he moved to Venezuela permanently as a baseball instructor. He later managed Venezuela at the 1973 Amateur World Series held in Havana, steering the team to a bronze medal.
