= 2017 World Baseball Classic – Qualifier 3 =

Qualifier 3 of the Qualifying Round of the 2017 World Baseball Classic was held at Rod Carew Stadium, Panama City, Panama from March 17 to 20, 2016.

Qualifier 3 was a modified double-elimination tournament. The winners for the first games matched up in the second game, while the losers faced each other in an elimination game. The winners of the elimination game then played the losers of the non-elimination game in another elimination game. The remaining two teams then played each other to determine the winners of the Qualifier 3.

== Bracket ==
Preliminaries
–	Colombia	9
–	Spain	2
–	France	2
–	Panama	9
Lower round 1
L1	Spain	3
L2	France	5

Semifinals
W1	Colombia	6
W2	Panama	3
Lower final
W3	France	4
L4	Panama	7

Qualifier
W4	Colombia	2
W5	Panama	1

== Results ==
- All times are Eastern Standard Time (UTC−05:00).

=== Colombia 9, Spain 2 ===
March 17 13:00 at Rod Carew Stadium
Team	1	2	3	4	5	6	7	8	9	R	H	E
Colombia	1	0	1	0	3	0	0	4	0	9	9	2
Spain	0	0	0	0	0	2	0	0	0	2	7	3
WP: William Cuevas (1−0) LP: Sergio Pérez (0−1); Attendance: 2,145 (7.9%); Umpires: HP − Jorge Nieblas, 1B − Shane Livensparger, 2B − Max Guyll, 3B − Hua-wen Chi; Boxscore

=== Panama 9, France 2 ===
March 17 20:00 at Rod Carew Stadium
Team	1	2	3	4	5	6	7	8	9	R	H	E
France	0	0	0	0	1	0	0	0	1	2	5	3
Panama	1	2	1	0	4	1	0	0	X	9	10	2
WP: Paolo Espino (1−0) LP: Owen Ozanich (0−1); Home runs: FRA: None; PAN: Carlos Ruiz 2 (2), Javier Guerra (1); Attendance: 11,744 (43.5%); Umpires: HP − Jairo Mendoza, 1B − Max Guyll, 2B − Hua-wen Chi, 3B − Shane Livensparger; Boxscore

=== France 5, Spain 3 ===
March 18 13:00 at Rod Carew Stadium
Team	1	2	3	4	5	6	7	8	9	R	H	E
France	3	0	2	0	0	0	0	0	0	5	12	1
Spain	0	0	0	0	1	1	0	1	0	3	9	2
WP: Leonel Cespedes (1−0) LP: Richard Salazar (0−1) Sv: Pierrick Le Mestre (1); Attendance: 852 (3.2%); Umpires: HP − Hua-wen Chi, 1B − Jorge Nieblas, 2B − Max Guyll, 3B − Alex Ortiz; Boxscore

=== Colombia 6, Panama 3 ===
March 18 20:00 at Rod Carew Stadium
Team	1	2	3	4	5	6	7	8	9	R	H	E
Colombia	0	0	4	0	0	0	2	0	0	6	12	2
Panama	0	0	1	0	0	0	1	0	1	3	3	0
WP: Karl Triana (1−0) LP: Davis Romero (0−1); Home runs: COL: Reynaldo Rodriguez (1); PAN: Javier Guerra (2); Attendance: 12,559 (46.5%); Umpires: HP − Shane Livensparger, 1B − Alex Ortiz, 2B − Jorge Nieblas, 3B − Jairo Mendoza; Boxscore

=== Panama 7, France 4 ===
March 19 20:00 at Rod Carew Stadium
Team	1	2	3	4	5	6	7	8	9	R	H	E
Panama	0	0	0	0	4	0	1	2	0	7	10	1
France	2	0	0	1	1	0	0	0	0	4	7	3
WP: Angel Cuan (1−0) LP: Jonathan Mottay (0−1) Sv: Manny Corpas (1); Home runs: PAN: None; FRA: Rene Leveret (1); Attendance: 2,016 (7.5%); Umpires: HP − Max Guyll, 1B − Jairo Mendoza, 2B − Alex Ortiz, 3B − Jorge Nieblas; Boxscore

=== Colombia 2, Panama 1 ===
March 20 18:00 at Rod Carew Stadium
Team	1	2	3	4	5	6	7	8	9	R	H	E
Panama	0	0	0	1	0	0	0	0	0	1	5	0
Colombia	0	0	0	0	0	1	0	1	X	2	7	0
WP: Carlos Díaz (1−0) LP: Manny Corpas (0−1) Sv: Horacio Acosta (1); Home runs: PAN: None; COL: Dilson Herrera (1); Attendance: 6,204 (23.0%); Umpires: HP − Alex Ortiz, 1B − Hua-wen Chi, 2B − Shane Livensparger, 3B − Jairo Mendoza; Boxscore
