= Eduardo Green =

Nicaraguan baseball player (1920–1980)

- Shortstop / Outfielder
- Born: August 30, 1920; Bluefields, Atlantico Sur, Nicaragua
- Died: September 13, 1980 (aged 60); Managua, Nicaragua
Medals
Representing Nicaragua
Men's baseball
Amateur World Series
Bronze medal – third place	1947 Cartagena	Team
Central American and Caribbean Games
Bronze medal – third place	1950 Guatemala City	Team

Edward Green Sinclair (August 30, 1920 – September 13, 1980) was a Nicaraguan professional baseball player. Nicknamed La Gacela Negra ("The Black Gazelle") in his home country, he played with the Nicaragua national baseball team and with the country's professional league, as well as a brief stint in organized baseball. The father of major leaguer David Green, the elder Green is considered one of the greatest Nicaraguan baseball players of all time in his own right.

== Career ==
Born in Bluefields, the largest city of Nicaragua’s English-speaking Mosquito Coast, Green's father was an Anglican preacher who immigrated from Jamaica. He gained the Spanish nickname "Eduardo" after he moved to the Spanish-speaking part of the country. He joined the Campos Azules (Bluefields) club that played Chinandega for the national championship in 1940; the following year, Green joined the Atlantic coast champions, Zelaya, which played Indios del Bóer for the national title. After the series, Green remained in Managua and joined the Olímpico club; that team would eventually become Cinco Estrellas, the team sponsored by Nicaraguan dictator Anastasio Somoza García. Green, playing with Cinco Estrellas, would win nine national amateur championships in 11 years from 1944 to 1954.

Green also was a mainstay of the Nicaraguan national team. Originally a shortstop, national team pilot Ramón Méndez changed his position to center field at the 1944 Amateur World Series, a position he would field for the rest of his career. Green was with the team which won the bronze medal at the 1947 Amateur World Series in Cartagena; he batted .450 (18-for-40) and tied with his teammate Jorge Hernández for the tournament lead in runs scored, with 14. At the 1948 tournament, held in Nicaragua, Green led the tournament in runs batted in, with 11. At the 1950 tournament, Green went 19 for 39 (.487) with seven doubles.

After playing with Nicaraguan at the 1951 Pan American Games in Buenos Aires, Green was signed ot a professional contract by the Brooklyn Dodgers, though he left the team in spring training. Accounts differ, though René Cárdenas later claimed that Green left due to his disgust with the racism encountered while training with the Montreal Royals in Daytona Beach, Florida. He officially turned professional in the Panamanian League in 1952 with Cervecería, and later played with the Havana Cubans of the Florida International League in 1953. He also played with Vanytor in the Colombian winter league.

Green died in Managua of a kidney infection in 1980, less than a year before his son, David Green, made his debut with the St. Louis Cardinals. The elder Green was inducted into the Nicaraguan Sports Hall of Fame in 1995.
