= Baseball at the 1946 Central American and Caribbean Games =

- Venue: Estadio de Baseball, Barranquilla
- Dates: 9 — 28 December 1946
- Competitors: 146 from 9 nations
- Teams: 9

Medalists
| gold medal | Colombia |
| silver medal | Dominican Republic |
| bronze medal | Cuba |

Baseball was contested at the 1946 Central American and Caribbean Games in Barranquilla, Colombia.

== Participating nations ==
Nine countries participated. The number of athletes a nation entered is in parentheses beside the name of the country.

- Colombia (18)
- Costa Rica (18)
- Cuba (18)
- Mexico (20)
- Panama (18)
- Puerto Rico (18)
- Dominican Republic (18)
- Venezuela (18)

Venezuela was pegged as the favorite to win the tournament, given the country's recent victories in the 1944 and 1945 Amateur World Series. However, the country was missing most of its 1945 championship-winning team, which had since turned professional with the establishment of the Venezuelan Professional Baseball League.

Willy Miranda, a future Major League Baseball with the New York Yankees and Baltimore Orioles, made his debut with the Cuba national team in the 1946 Games, hitting .250.

== Medalists ==
| Event | Gold | Silver | Bronze |
|---|---|---|---|
| Men's baseball | Colombia (COL); Humberto Vargas; Armando Crizon; Pedro Miranda; Carlos Bustos; José Araújo; Isaac Villers; Julio Florez; Ramón Herazo; Carlos Rodríguez; Andrés Cavadías; Julio Galofra; Cosme Pájaro; Andrés Florez; Enrique Hernández; Pedro Zambrano; Cipriano Herrera; Manuel Peñaranda; José Corpas Manager: Pelayo Chacón | Dominican Republic (DOM); Luis M. Muñoz; Marino Pérez; Ramón E. Vargas; Vicente Scarpatte; Juan B. Álvarez; Aquiles Martínez; Rafael A. Vargas; Oscar A. Álvarez; Miguel Payano; Bienvenido Arias; Oscar Mir; José A. Matos; Manuel A. Trabous; Julio Lara; Luis T. Vinals; Diomedes Olivo; Román Ramos; Fernando Abreu Manager: Burrulote Rodríguez | Cuba (CUB); Rouget Ávalos; Bernardo Cuervo; Mario Chacón; Julio Delgado; Mario Díaz; Alfredo Domínguez; Ignacio Ferrer; Alberto Gómez; Ángel González; Hiram González; José L. García; Guillermo Miranda; Miguel Montiel; Mario Pérez; Ramiro Ramírez; René Solís; Gilberto Soto; Generoso Stable Manager: Victor Muñoz |

== Group stage ==
The group stage featured a round robin format to determine the medal winners, similar to the format of the 1938 tournament.

| Pos | Team | Pld | W | L | T | PCT | GB |
|---|---|---|---|---|---|---|---|
| 1 | Colombia (H) | 7 | 6 | 1 | 0 | .857 | — |
| 2 | Cuba | 7 | 6 | 1 | 0 | .857 | — |
| 3 | Dominican Republic | 7 | 4 | 3 | 0 | .571 | 2 |
| 4 | Puerto Rico | 7 | 3 | 3 | 1 | .500 | 2.5 |
| 5 | Venezuela | 7 | 3 | 3 | 1 | .500 | 2.5 |
| 6 | Panama | 7 | 2 | 3 | 2 | .429 | 3 |
| 7 | Mexico | 7 | 2 | 5 | 0 | .286 | 4 |
| 8 | Costa Rica | 7 | 0 | 7 | 0 | .000 | 6 |

Source: Centro Caribe Sports
(H) Hosts

== Final stage ==
| Pos | Team | Pld | W | L | T | RF | RA | RD | PCT | GB |
|---|---|---|---|---|---|---|---|---|---|---|
| 1 | Colombia (H) | 2 | 1 | 0 | 1 | 3 | 1 | +2 | .750 | — |
| 2 | Dominican Republic | 2 | 1 | 0 | 1 | 4 | 3 | +1 | .750 | — |
| 3 | Cuba | 2 | 0 | 2 | 0 | 2 | 5 | −3 | .000 | 1.5 |

Source: Centro Caribe Sports
(H) Hosts

=== Gold medal game ===
Colombia and the Dominican Republic, which both defeated Cuba in the tie-breaker, tied in a thirteen-inning pitcher's duel on December 26. A rematch, which would decide the baseball champion at the tournament, was scheduled for December 28, after the closing ceremonies. However, the Dominican team did not appear, because their return flight had already been booked for the evening of the 28th. Thus, the games committee pronounced Colombia the winners of the tournament.

28 December 1946 08:00 at Estadio de Baseball
Team
Dominican Republic
Colombia
Umpires: John P. Corrigan
Notes: Game forfeited by the Dominican Republic. Colombia wins gold medal.
Boxscore

== Statistical leaders ==
=== Batting ===
| Statistic | Name | Total |
|---|---|---|
| Batting average | (Puerto Rico) César González | .479 |
| Hits | (Cuba) Alberto Gómez | 15 |
| Runs | (Colombia) Pedro Miranda (Venezuela) Fausto Fuenmayor | 8 |
| Home runs | (Dominican Republic) Manuel Trabous | 1 |
| Stolen bases | (Colombia) Pedro Miranda | 7 |

=== Pitching ===
| Statistic | Name | Total |
|---|---|---|
| Wins | (Colombia) Carlos Rodríguez | 3 |
| Losses | 5 tied with (Note: Emilio Silva (VEN), Ángel González (CUB), T. Mena (CRC), José Gordón (CRC), Alberto Osorio (PAN)) | 2 |
| Innings pitched | (Dominican Republic) Diomedes Olivo | 36.1 |
| Earned run average* | (Colombia) Carlos Rodríguez | 0.00 |
| Strikeouts | (Dominican Republic) Diomedes Olivo | 27 |

* Minimum 15 innings pitched
