= Petaca Rodríguez =

Colombian baseball player (1915–1990)

- Pitcher
- Born: December 23, 1915; Cartagena, Colombia
- Died: November 15, 1990 (aged 74); Cartagena, Colombia
- Batted: Right Threw: Right
Medals
Representing Colombia
Men's baseball
Amateur World Series
Gold medal – first place	1947 Cartagena	Team
Silver medal – second place	1945 Caracas	Team
Central American and Caribbean Games
Gold medal – first place	1946 Barranquilla	Team
Bolivarian Games
Gold medal – first place	1947-48 Lima	Team
Silver medal – second place	1938 Bogotá	Team

Carlos "Petaca" Rodríguez Araújo (December 23, 1915 – November 15, 1990) was a Colombian professional baseball pitcher. He is considered one of the greatest Colombian baseball players of all time.

== Career ==
Rodríguez began playing in Colombia's amateur leagues as an outfielder, before transitioning to pitching in Barranquilla. He debuted with the Colombia national baseball team at 23 years old, at the 1938 Bolivarian Games. He also appeared in three Amateur World Series (AWS) tournaments in 1944, 1945, and 1947, as well as the 1946 Central American and Caribbean Games. At the 1946 games, he led the tournament earned run average (0.00) over 29 innings pitched (second only to Diomedes Olivo's 36.1 IP). Jorge Pasquel, then-president of the Mexican League, offered Rodríguez a $5,000 contract to sign with Monterrey; Rodríguez declined the offer.

Rodríguez led the Colombian team to its first world championship in baseball at the 1947 Amateur World Series, held in Cartagena. In the run-up to the series, he petitioned the national government to build a new stadium in Cartagena, which would become the Estadio Once de Noviembre. His participation in the tournament was controversial; Cuba withdrew from the tournament, alleging that Rodríguez had forfeited his amateur status after playing in Panama's professional league.

Rodríguez played with several teams in the Colombian Professional Baseball League, including Indios de Cartagena, Torices de Cartagena, and Vanytor de Barranquilla. In 1948, he pitched a shutout against the Havana Cubans of the Florida International League.

Rodríguez was left off the Colombian roster for the 1952 Latin American Series due to a purported disagreement with the manager, Juan González Cornet. But in 1956, he again played with the Colombian national team at the 1956 Global World Series, held in Milwaukee; Rodríguez allowed only three hits in a 7–1 victory over the Netherlands. Rodríguez eventually retired in 1957.

== Death and legacy ==
Rodríguez died at the Hospital Universitario in Cartagena on November 15, 1990.

Chelo de Castro, a Colombian sports journalist, said that Rodríguez was we "the first Colombian professional pitcher who could have reached the major leagues. He was original. He did not have any great speed nor great control, nor a big curve, but some of each of those qualities and that's why he was dominant."
