= Time in Saint Vincent and the Grenadines =

- Time zone: Atlantic Standard Time
- Initials: AST
- UTC offset: UTC−4

Daylight saving time
- DST not observed

tz database
- America/St_Vincent

Saint Vincent and the Grenadines observes Atlantic Standard Time (UTC−4) year-round.

== IANA time zone database ==
In the IANA time zone database, Saint Vincent and the Grenadines is given one zone in the file zone.tab—America/St_Vincent, which is synonymous with the zone for time in Puerto Rico. Data for America/St_Vincent directly from zone.tab of the IANA time zone database; columns marked with * are the columns from zone.tab itself:

c.c.*	coordinates*	TZ*	Comments	UTC offset	DST
VC	+1309−06114	America/St_Vincent		−04:00	−04:00
