= Baseball at the 1938 Bolivarian Games =

Baseball tournament

Tournament details
- Country: Colombia
- Venue(s): 1 (in 1 host city)
- Dates: August 14–16, 1938
- Teams: 2

Final positions
- Champions: Venezuela (1st title)
- Runners-up: Colombia

Tournament statistics
- Games played: 5 (Note: Only the first two games were played, while the last three were forfeited.)

Baseball was contested at the 1938 Bolivarian Games in Bogotá, Colombia. It was scheduled as a five-game series between the Colombia and Venezuela national baseball teams, to be held from August 14 to August 19, 1938, at the Campo Deportivo La Salle in Chapinero. Though baseball is popular on the coastal Caribbean region of Colombia, the 1938 games were reportedly the first time that baseball was played in Bogotá.

The tournament was the international debut of the Colombia national team, managed by Enrique Lantigua, a Negro league baseball player from the Dominican Republic. It was the second appearance of the Venezuela national team, which had debuted earlier that year at the Central American and Caribbean Games, and was the first time that the team wore its distinctive "vinotinto" red color.

The first two games were split between the two participants, with the home team taking each game. However, the third game was postponed due to various oversights by the organizing committee. The remaining games were eventually canceled by the Colombian team, effectively forfeiting the title to Venezuela.

== Venue ==
Chapinero, Bogotá, Colombia	Baseball at the 1938 Bolivarian Games is located in Bogotá, Colombia
Campo Deportivo de la Salle	Baseball at the 1938 Bolivarian Games is located in Bogotá, Colombia

== Results ==
=== Game 1 ===
August 14, 1938 14:30 (UTC−5) at Campo Deportivo La Salle in Bogotá, Colombia
Team	1	2	3	4	5	6	7	8	9	R	H
Colombia	1	0	0	0	0	1	0	0	0	2	8
Venezuela	2	1	0	0	0	0	3	0	X	6	7
WP: Natividad Sanoja LP: Samuel Saltarín; Boxscore

=== Game 2 ===
August 15, 1938 10:00 (UTC−5) at Campo Deportivo La Salle in Bogotá, Colombia
Team	1	2	3	4	5	6	7	8	9	R	H
Venezuela	0	1	2	0	1	1	0	0	0	5	8
Colombia	1	0	0	0	1	3	1	2	X	8	16
WP: Petaca Rodríguez LP: Manuel Castillo; Boxscore

=== Game 3 ===
The third game was scheduled to take place on August 16, also at the Campo Deportivo La Salle. However, when it came time to play, there were neither umpires nor games committee members present at the field. The game was rescheduled for the next day, August 17, but the organizers apparently gave different start times to the two participants; the Venezuelan team was told it would be in the morning, while the Colombians were told it would be in the afternoon.

After the fiasco of August 17th, the organizers changed the format of the series from best-of-five to best-of-three, meaning that the next game would be the tie-breaker and thus decide the tournament. On August 18th, however, only one umpire showed up at the playing field, and no committee members were present. The Colombian team voted to cancel the third game, effectively forfeiting the tournament to Venezuela.

== Medalists ==
Event	Gold	Silver
Men's baseball	Venezuela; Domingo Blanco; Humberto Viao; Andrés Naranjo; Manuel Castillo; Celestino Figueroa; Candelario Burgos; Candelario Guevara; Lorenzo Méndez; Miguel Cruz; Hector Figueroa; Agripio Mora; Pedro Terán; Germán Báez; Jose E. Vasquez; Natividad Sanoja; F. Figueredo; Felipe Viena; Vicente Figueroa	Colombia; Samuel Saltarín; Eugenio Diaz; Manuel Soñé; Carlos "Petaca" Rodriguez; Pedro Ramos; Pedro Meriño; Andrés Florez; José Ramón Cuadro; Victor Pedroza; Céstar Diaz; Pedro Miranda; José Araujo; Cosme Pájaro; Isaac Villero; Luis Lastra; Euclides Diaz; Isaac Diaz; Julián de Avila

== Statistical leaders ==
Statistic	Name	Total
Stolen bases	(Colombia) Carlos Rodríguez (Colombia) Euclides Díaz	3
Innings pitched	(Colombia) Carlos Rodríguez	9.1
Strikeouts	(Colombia) Carlos Rodríguez	5
