= Otilio Chourio =

Venezuela baseball manager

- Manager
- Born: Sucre Municipality, Zulia, Venezuela
Medals
Men's baseball
Representing Venezuela
Amateur World Series
Bronze medal – third place	1973 Havana	Team
Manager for Venezuela
Bolivarian Games
Gold medal – first place	2001 Guayaquil	Team

Otilio Chourio is a Venezuelan former baseball player, manager and scout. He has managed the Venezuela national baseball team as well as in the country's amateur league.

Chourio was born in the municipality of Sucre in the Venezuelan state of Zulia. As a player, he represented the state in Venezuela's Doble A baseball championship, as well as the country in international competition.

After his playing career, Chourio became a Major League Baseball scout, including for the Boston Red Sox. He signed Elvis Araújo as a international free agent for the Cleveland Indians. He also managed the Venezuelan team in several competitions, including the 1983 Big League World Series, the 2001 Bolivarian Games and the 2002 Intercontinental Cup. He was also part of the coaching staff at the 2004 Americas Olympic Baseball Qualifying Tournament.
