= Ramón del Monte =

Dominican Republic baseball player

- Pitcher
- Born: December 28, 1925 (Note: Alternatively given as December 20, 1923); Villa González, Santiago, Dominican Republic
- Died: June 28, 1990 (aged 64)
- Batted: Right Threw: Right

Career highlights and awards
- Amateur World Series MVP (1948); Dominican Sports Hall of Fame (1986)
Medals
Men's baseball
Representing Dominican Republic
Amateur World Series
| Gold medal – first place | 1948 Managua | Team |

Ramón del Monte y Consuegra (December 28, 1925 — June 28, 1990), nicknamed Sijo, was a baseball player from the Dominican Republic. Though his professional baseball career, mainly with the Leones del Escogido, was modest, among Dominicans he is considered one of the greatest amateur baseball players of all time.

Sijo del Monte was born in El Palmar Abajo in Villa González, Santiago Province. With the Santiago club, he threw a no-hitter on August 26, 1945. In a 1948 exhibition game against the Brooklyn Dodgers, del Monte excelled, striking out Roy Campanella three times in a row. By 1949, he played in the first division of amateur baseball.

With the Dominican Republic national team, del Monte starred at the 1948 Amateur World Series held in Managua, Nicaragua. He earned the best win-loss record in the group stage (4-0) and led in earned run average, allowed only one earned run in 32.2 innings pitched. In the final best-of-three series, he registered one of the two wins for the Dominican Republic against Puerto Rico, winning the country's first major international title. Del Monte was awarded the distinction of most valuable player.

Del Monte turned professional in the Puerto Rican Winter League. He also played in Nicaragua and Colombia. In 1951, with the resurgence of professional baseball in the Dominican Republic, he signed with Escogido, pitching alongside Joe Page, Dan Bankhead, and Wilfredo Salas; the team also included stars of the major Negro leagues such as Lorenzo Cabrera, Barney Serrell, Howard Easterling, Willard Brown and Valmy Thomas.

A 1951 fan poll named del Monte one of the most popular players in Dominican baseball, along with Diomedes Olivo, Tetelo Vargas, and Pepe Lucas, among others. He later played with the Estrellas Orientales, giving up the 300th home run in Dominican professional baseball history to Willie Kirkland of Escogido on December 10, 1955.

He was inducted into the Dominican Sports Hall of Fame in 1986. An amateur softball league based in New York City is named in his honor.
