= Capote =

Capote may refer to:

== People ==
- Capote Band of Utes, a branch of the Ute people
- Truman Capote, an American author, screenwriter, playwright, and actor
- Manuel Capote, a Venezuelan baseball player and manager

== Art, entertainment, and media ==
- Capote (film), a 2005 biographical film starring Philip Seymour Hoffman as Truman Capote

== Other ==
- Capote (garment), an early 19th-century winter coat made with a wool blanket such as a Hudson's Bay point blanket
- Capote (horse), Champion American Thoroughbred racehorse
- Capote, the dress cape worn by a matador or torero
- Capote, a model of woman's bonnet (headgear)
- Kapoteh, sometimes spelled capote, a type of frock coat often worn by married Hasidic Jews
