= Nino Escalera =

Puerto Rican baseball player (1929–2021)

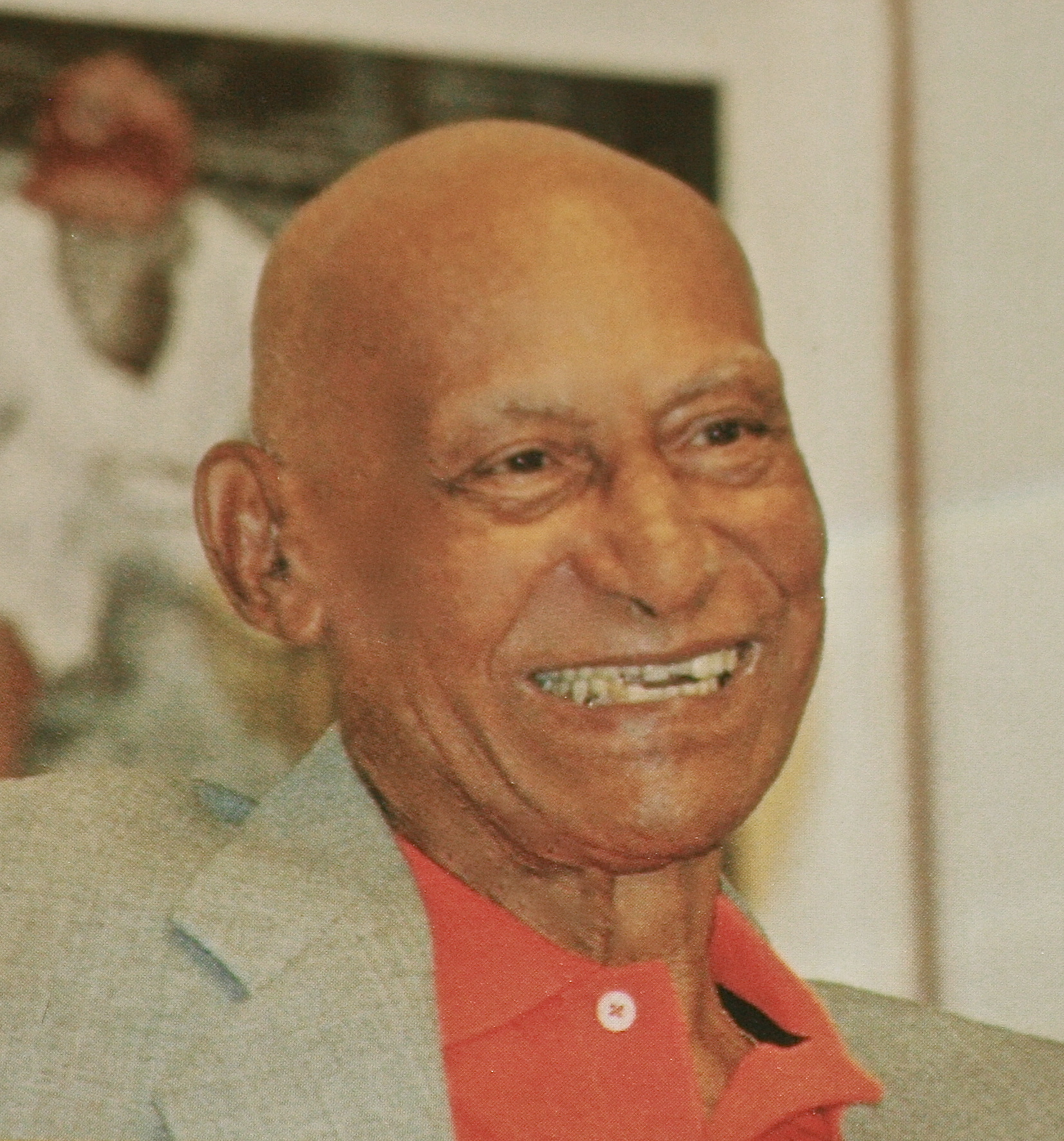
- Outfielder / First baseman
- Born: December 1, 1929; Santurce, Puerto Rico
- Died: July 3, 2021 (aged 91); Rio Piedras, Puerto Rico
- Batted: Left Threw: Left

MLB debut
- April 17, 1954, for the Cincinnati Redlegs

Last MLB appearance
- September 25, 1954, for the Cincinnati Redlegs

MLB statistics
- Batting average: .159
- Home runs: 0
- Runs batted in: 3
- Stats at Baseball Reference

Teams
- Cincinnati Redlegs (1954)

Career highlights and awards
- Amateur World Series MVP (1947)
Medals
Men's baseball
Representing Puerto Rico
Baseball World Cup
Silver medal – second place	1947 Cartagena	Team

Saturnino Escalera Cuadrado (December 1, 1929 – July 3, 2021) was a Puerto Rican former professional baseball player and scout whose playing career extended for 14 seasons (1949–1962). The outfielder and first baseman appeared for one full season, 1954, in Major League Baseball for the Cincinnati Redlegs and was the first player of African descent to appear in an MLB game for the Cincinnati franchise. He threw and batted left-handed, stood 5 feet 10 inches (1.78 m) tall and 165 pounds (75 kg).

== Playing career ==
Born in Santurce, Escalera started his baseball career at a very young age, often playing with his brothers and neighbors from the Loiza Street in his hometown. In 1947 at the Amateur World Series held in Colombia, Escalera was named best first baseman and most valuable player (MVP) of the tournament. In 1950, the New York Yankees organization obtained Escalera from the Bristol Owls of the Colonial League. Nino Escalera led the LBPPR in triples in 1950-51, 1952-53 and 1959-60. In 1952, he was purchased by the Toledo Mud Hens of the American Association, and later that year, by the Cincinnati organization.

On April 17, 1954, at Milwaukee County Stadium, a 24-year-old Escalera became the first black to play for the Cincinnati Reds franchise, known during the mid-1950s as the Redlegs. He entered the game in the seventh inning as a pinch hitter and hit a single in a 5–1 loss to the Milwaukee Braves. He played in 73 games during his only big league season, often as a pinch hitter. Season and career totals include a .159 batting average (11-for-69), three runs batted in, 15 runs scored, and an on-base percentage of .234. He committed just one error in 49 total chances for a fielding percentage of .980. On May 22, Escalara became the last left-handed thrower to play shortstop in a National League game. Escalera entered that game with two out and a baserunner on first in the eighth inning and took veteran starter Roy McMillan's place at shortstop. The hitter was the St. Louis Cardinals' Baseball Hall of Famer Stan Musial, who would set the NL record for career hits before his 1963 retirement. Facing right-handed pitcher Art Fowler, Musial struck out to end the inning, denying Escalera a fielding chance. He was replaced by Rocky Bridges for the ninth inning, and the Redlegs won the game, 4–2. Escalera returned to the minor leagues in 1955 with the Havana Sugar Kings and was selected for and played in the 1958 International League All-Star Game.

=== Professional baseball playing experience ===
- 1949–1950 Colonial League (Class B) Bristol Owls
- 1950 Canadian–American League (Class C) Amsterdam Rugmakers (New York Yankees)
- 1951 Central League (Class A) Muskegon Reds (Yankees)
- 1951 International League (Triple-A) Syracuse Chiefs
- 1952 American Association (Triple-A) Toledo Mud Hens/Charleston Senators
- 1953 American Association (Triple-A) Indianapolis Indians (Cleveland Indians)
- 1953 Texas League (Double-A) Tulsa Oilers (Cincinnati Redlegs)
- 1954 National League (MLB) Cincinnati Redlegs
- 1955–1958 International League (Triple-A) Havana Sugar Kings (Redlegs)
- 1959–1961 International League (Triple-A) Columbus Jets (Pittsburgh Pirates)
- 1962 International League (Triple-A) Rochester Red Wings (Baltimore Orioles)

== Scouting career ==
After his active career, Escalera worked as a scout for the New York Mets' organization from 1966 to 1981. In 1982, he scouted for the San Francisco Giants. Among players signed by Escalera are retired major league players Jerry Morales, Ed Figueroa, Benny Ayala, José Oquendo and Juan Berenguer. Escalera is a member of the Puerto Rico Baseball Hall of Fame, Río Piedras Sport Hall of Fame, Puerto Rican Sports Hall of Fame and Santurce Sports Hall of Fame. In 2015, he was also named as one of the best 75 baseball players who ever played in Puerto Rico winter league history.

== Later life and legacy ==
Escalera was inducted into the Puerto Rico Sports Hall of Fame in 1983 and the Puerto Rican Baseball Hall of Fame in 1992. Escalera's nephew Ruben Escalera, played for the Milwaukee Brewers minor league organization, later became a professional baseball scout and is a professional baseball manager as of 2012. Another nephew, Alfredo Escalera, was drafted by the Kansas City Royals as the youngest player ever to be drafted by any organization.

Escalera died on July 3, 2021, at the age of 91.

== See also ==
- List of Puerto Ricans
- List of first black Major League Baseball players by team and date
