= Valmy Thomas =

Crucian baseball player (1925–2010)

- Catcher
- Born: October 21, 1925; Santurce, Puerto Rico
- Died: October 16, 2010 (aged 84); Christiansted, St. Croix, Virgin Islands
- Batted: Right Threw: Right

MLB debut
- April 16, 1957, for the New York Giants

Last MLB appearance
- October 1, 1961, for the Cleveland Indians

MLB statistics
- Batting average: .230
- Home runs: 12
- Runs batted in: 60
- Stats at Baseball Reference

Teams
- New York/San Francisco Giants (1957–1958); Philadelphia Phillies (1959); Baltimore Orioles (1960); Cleveland Indians (1961)
Medals
Men's baseball
Representing Puerto Rico
Baseball World Cup
Silver medal – second place	1947 Cartagena	Team

Valmy Thomas (October 21, 1925 – October 16, 2010) was a Major League Baseball catcher. Thomas was the first Virgin Islander to play in the major leagues post-integration; born in Puerto Rico, he also represented the island in international competition. Thomas was listed as 5 feet 9 inches (1.75 m) tall and 165 pounds (75 kg); he threw and batted right-handed.

== Early life ==
Thomas was born in Santurce, Puerto Rico, because of better medical care available there. The family returned to their native Saint Croix immediately after his birth.

In 1947, Thomas played in Puerto Rico's amateur league with the Parada 20 club as a pitcher; he led the league in earned run average with 0.99. After the season, he was named to the Puerto Rico national baseball team for the 1947 Amateur World Series, playing as a third baseman; the team won the silver medal, falling short to hosts Colombia in the final game.

== Professional career ==
His professional career began in 1951; then, after a three-year hiatus, it resumed in 1955 in the Class C Provincial League in the Canadian province of Quebec. In his five-year major league career (1957–61), he played for five different home cities: the New York / San Francisco Giants (1957–1958), Philadelphia Phillies (1959), Baltimore Orioles (1960) and Cleveland Indians (1961). Thomas was one of the original San Francisco Giants, opening the 1958 season as their starting catcher in their first-ever official game on the West Coast. In 252 total MLB games played, he started 182 games behind the plate. He collected 144 hits, with 20 doubles, three triples, 12 home runs and 60 runs batted in. He hit .230 lifetime.

After his major league career, while playing for the Atlanta Crackers of the International League in 1962, Thomas was shot and critically wounded in a dispute over a woman by mortician-musician Cleveland Lyons, who then committed suicide. That season was the last of Thomas's professional career.

Thomas died in Christiansted, Saint Croix, Virgin Islands, at the age of 84.
