= Roberto Vargas =

Puerto Rican baseball player (born 1929)

- Pitcher
- Born: May 29, 1929; Santurce, Puerto Rico
- Died: May 27, 2014 (aged 84); Caguas, Puerto Rico
- Batted: Left Threw: Left

Professional debut
- NgL: 1948, for the Chicago American Giants
- MLB: April 17, 1955, for the Milwaukee Braves

Last MLB appearance
- September 21, 1955, for the Milwaukee Braves

MLB (Note: On December 16, 2020, Major League Baseball declared the Negro leagues, from the span of 1920–1948, to be a "Major League". Vargas' statistics reflect his time in the Negro leagues during the 1948 season.) statistics
- Win–loss record: 0–1
- Earned run average: 7.46
- Strikeouts: 20
- Stats at Baseball Reference

Teams
- Negro leagues: Chicago American Giants (1948); Major League Baseball: Milwaukee Braves (1955)

Career highlights and awards
- NgL All-Star (1948)

Member of the Caribbean

Baseball Hall of Fame
- Induction: 2020
Medals
Men's baseball
Representing Puerto Rico
Baseball World Cup
Silver medal – second place	1947 Cartagena	Team

Roberto Enrique Vargas Vélez (May 29, 1929 – May 27, 2014) was a Puerto Rican pitcher in Major League Baseball and Negro league baseball. Vargas played for the Chicago American Giants for one season in 1948, in which he was named a Negro League All-Star. He also played one season for the Milwaukee Braves of the National League during the 1955 season. He was born in Santurce, Puerto Rico.

Vargas pitched for the Puerto Rico national baseball team at the 1947 Amateur World Series.

Vargas was among the first ten Puerto Rican ball players to debut in MLB, making his first appearance for Milwaukee on April 17, 1955, the same day as fellow Boricua Roberto Clemente did it with the Pittsburgh Pirates. Vargas was origianally considered Black and not Puerto Rican, which excluded him from playing in the Majors until Jackie Robinson broke the color barrier.

He made 25 relief appearances for the Braves, allowing 23 earned runs on 39 hits and 14 walks for an 8.76 ERA, while striking out 13 in 24 2/3 innings of work and did not have a decision.

Sent back to the minors midway through the season, Vargas, who had pitched for the Chicago American Giants of the Negro American League in 1948, performed for 11 teams in eight different leagues in a span of eight seasons from 1949–1960. He played four years in the Mexican League as well as winter baseball at Puerto Rico between 1947 and 1961, while representing his country several times in the Caribbean Series tournament.

Eventually, Vargas had a long career coaching and managing in the Puerto Rico winter league. There, he advised young pitching prospects about the importance of throwing first-pitch strikes and pounding the strike zone and jamming hitters.

Vargas died in 2014 in Caguas, Puerto Rico, two days short of his 85th birthday.

== See also ==
- List of Negro league baseball players who played in Major League Baseball
