= 2013 World Baseball Classic Pool C =

Baseball competition

Pool C of the First Round of the 2013 World Baseball Classic was held at Hiram Bithorn Stadium, San Juan, Puerto Rico from March 7 to 10, 2013.

Pool C was a round-robin tournament. Each team played the other three teams once each, with the top two teams advancing to Pool 2.

== Standings ==
| Pos | Team | Pld | W | L | RF | RA | RD | PCT | GB | Qualification |
|---|---|---|---|---|---|---|---|---|---|---|
| 1 | Dominican Republic | 3 | 3 | 0 | 19 | 8 | +11 | 1.000 | — | Advance to second round Qualification for 2017 World Baseball Classic |
| 2 | Puerto Rico (H) | 3 | 2 | 1 | 11 | 7 | +4 | .667 | 1 | Advance to second round Qualification for 2017 World Baseball Classic |
| 3 | Venezuela | 3 | 1 | 2 | 17 | 21 | −4 | .333 | 2 | Qualification for 2017 World Baseball Classic |
| 4 | Spain | 3 | 0 | 3 | 9 | 20 | −11 | .000 | 3 | |

Rules for classification: Tiebreakers
(H) Hosts

Pool C MVP: (Dominican Republic) Robinson Canó

== Results ==
- All times are Atlantic Standard Time (UTC−04:00).

=== Dominican Republic 9, Venezuela 3 ===
March 7 19:30 at Hiram Bithorn Stadium
| Team | 1 | 2 | 3 | 4 | 5 | 6 | 7 | 8 | 9 | R | H | E |
|---|---|---|---|---|---|---|---|---|---|---|---|---|
| Venezuela | 0 | 0 | 2 | 1 | 0 | 0 | 0 | 0 | 0 | 3 | 6 | 1 |
| Dominican Republic | 3 | 2 | 0 | 0 | 1 | 0 | 3 | 0 | X | 9 | 13 | 0 |
WP: Pedro Strop (1−0) LP: Aníbal Sánchez (0−1); Home runs: VEN: None; DOM: Hanley Ramírez (1); Attendance: 15,055 (82.4%); Umpires: HP − Eric Cooper, 1B − Ed Hickox, 2B − Paul Hyham, 3B − Jesus Miller; Boxscore

=== Puerto Rico 3, Spain 0 ===
March 8 18:30 at Hiram Bithorn Stadium
| Team | 1 | 2 | 3 | 4 | 5 | 6 | 7 | 8 | 9 | R | H | E |
|---|---|---|---|---|---|---|---|---|---|---|---|---|
| Spain | 0 | 0 | 0 | 0 | 0 | 0 | 0 | 0 | 0 | 0 | 5 | 1 |
| Puerto Rico | 3 | 0 | 0 | 0 | 0 | 0 | 0 | 0 | X | 3 | 6 | 0 |
WP: Giancarlo Alvarado (1−0) LP: Sergio Pérez (0−1) Sv: Xavier Cedeño (1); Attendance: 14,974 (82.0%); Umpires: HP − Dan Bellino, 1B − Jesus Miller, 2B − Eric Cooper, 3B − Jair Fernandez; Boxscore

=== Dominican Republic 6, Spain 3 ===
March 9 12:00 at Hiram Bithorn Stadium
| Team | 1 | 2 | 3 | 4 | 5 | 6 | 7 | 8 | 9 | R | H | E |
|---|---|---|---|---|---|---|---|---|---|---|---|---|
| Dominican Republic | 0 | 2 | 3 | 0 | 0 | 0 | 0 | 1 | 0 | 6 | 9 | 1 |
| Spain | 0 | 0 | 0 | 0 | 0 | 0 | 1 | 0 | 2 | 3 | 9 | 1 |
WP: Samuel Deduno (1−0) LP: Yoanner Negrin (0−1) Sv: Fernando Rodney (1); Home runs: DOM: Carlos Santana (1); ESP: None; Attendance: 13,421 (73.5%); Umpires: HP − Paul Hyham, 1B − Dan Bellino, 2B − Eric Cooper, 3B − Jesus Miller; Boxscore

=== Puerto Rico 6, Venezuela 3 ===
March 9 18:30 at Hiram Bithorn Stadium
| Team | 1 | 2 | 3 | 4 | 5 | 6 | 7 | 8 | 9 | R | H | E |
|---|---|---|---|---|---|---|---|---|---|---|---|---|
| Puerto Rico | 0 | 0 | 0 | 2 | 1 | 0 | 0 | 3 | 0 | 6 | 9 | 1 |
| Venezuela | 0 | 0 | 2 | 0 | 0 | 0 | 0 | 0 | 1 | 3 | 7 | 0 |
WP: Nelson Figueroa (1−0) LP: Henderson Álvarez (0−1) Sv: Fernando Cabrera (1); Attendance: 18,800 (102.9%); Umpires: HP − Ed Hickox, 1B − Jair Fernandez, 2B − Dan Bellino, 3B − Jesus Miller; Boxscore

=== Venezuela 11, Spain 6 ===
March 10 12:30 at Hiram Bithorn Stadium
| Team | 1 | 2 | 3 | 4 | 5 | 6 | 7 | 8 | 9 | R | H | E |
|---|---|---|---|---|---|---|---|---|---|---|---|---|
| Spain | 3 | 0 | 0 | 0 | 2 | 0 | 0 | 0 | 1 | 6 | 7 | 1 |
| Venezuela | 0 | 0 | 0 | 6 | 0 | 2 | 0 | 3 | X | 11 | 16 | 1 |
WP: Ramón A. Ramírez (1−0) LP: Eddie Morlan (0−1); Home runs: ESP: Bárbaro Cañizares (1), Engel Beltré (1); VEN: Miguel Cabrera (1), Pablo Sandoval (1); Attendance: 13,395 (73.3%); Umpires: HP − Dan Bellino, 1B − Paul Hyham, 2B − Ed Hickox, 3B − Jair Fernandez; Boxscore

=== Dominican Republic 4, Puerto Rico 2 ===
March 10 19:30 at Hiram Bithorn Stadium
| Team | 1 | 2 | 3 | 4 | 5 | 6 | 7 | 8 | 9 | R | H | E |
|---|---|---|---|---|---|---|---|---|---|---|---|---|
| Dominican Republic | 1 | 0 | 0 | 0 | 1 | 1 | 1 | 0 | 0 | 4 | 12 | 1 |
| Puerto Rico | 0 | 0 | 0 | 2 | 0 | 0 | 0 | 0 | 0 | 2 | 7 | 2 |
WP: Lorenzo Barceló (1−0) LP: José Berríos (0−1) Sv: Fernando Rodney (2); Home runs: DOM: Robinson Canó (1); PUR: Mike Avilés (1); Attendance: 19,413 (106.3%); Umpires: HP − Eric Cooper, 1B − Ed Hickox, 2B − Paul Hyham, 3B − Jair Fernandez; Boxscore
