= Venezuela national baseball team =

Venezuela National Baseball Team

Information
- Country: Venezuela
- Federation: Venezuelan Baseball Federation
- Confederation: WBSC Americas
- Manager: Omar López
- Captain: Salvador Perez
- Team Colors: Yellow, Blue, Red, White, Cool Gray

WBSC ranking
- Current: 5 (26 October 2026)
- Highest: 3 (first in December 2024)
- Lowest: 11 (first in September 2018)

Uniforms
Home	Away

Olympic Games
- Appearances: 0, qualified for 2028 edition (first in 2028)
- Best result: To be determined

World Baseball Classic
- Appearances: 6 (first in 2006)
- Best result: (gold) 1st (1 time, in 2026)

World Cup
- Appearances: 18 (first in 1940)
- Best result: (gold) 1st (3 times, most recent in [[ Baseball World Cup|]])

Intercontinental Cup
- Appearances: 2 (first in 1973)
- Best result: 6 (1 time, in 2002)

Pan American Games
- Appearances: 3 (first in 1955)
- Best result: (gold) 1st (1 time, in 1959)

The Venezuela national baseball team (Spanish: Selección de béisbol de Venezuela or Selección de Venezuela) also known as "Arepa Power" is the national baseball team of Venezuela. It is currently ranked fifth in the world by the World Baseball Softball Confederation.

Venezuela has competed in every edition of the World Baseball Classic since 2006, with its best result before 2026 being a semifinal appearance in 2009. It won its first major international title in the 1941 Amateur World Series, defeating a heavily favored Team Cuba, and won two more world championships in the 1940s. It has also historically dominated baseball at the Bolivarian Games. In 2026, it qualified for the Summer Olympics for the first time via its performance in the World Baseball Classic.

Venezuela competed against Israel, Netherlands, Dominican Republic, and Nicaragua in the 2026 World Baseball Classic from 6–11 March 2026, at LoanDepot Park in Miami, Florida. After advancing from the group stage, Team Venezuela was undefeated in the knockout stage, facing Japan, Italy, and finally United States, notching their first World Baseball Classic win, 3–2.

== History ==
Venezuela debuted in international competition at the 1938 Central American and Caribbean Games in Panama City, finishing sixth. The country first participated in what was then the top level of international baseball competition, the Amateur World Series (later to be known as the Baseball World Cup), in 1940.

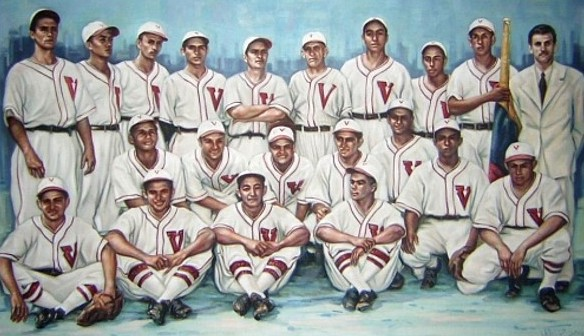
The "Heroes of '41"

Venezuela won its first international baseball title the following year, defeating defending champions Cuba at the 1941 Amateur World Series in Havana. The championship team, with illustrious names from the country's amateur circuits like Héctor Benítez, Daniel "Chino" Canónico, and José Antonio Casanova, was hailed as "Los Heroes del '41" ("Heroes of '41"). The victory of the 1941 AWS is cited as the catalyst for baseball's exploding popularity in Venezuela, Venezuelan President Isaías Medina Angarita declared 22 October, the day of the championship game, a national holiday.

=== World Baseball Classic era ===
==== 2009–23 ====
Venezuela competed in the 2009 World Baseball Classic, playing its opening games in Pool C, in Toronto, Ontario. The Venezuelans secured advancement out of Pool C with a pair of resounding wins over Italy. Along the way, Venezuela also lost a 15–6 slugfest against the United States, but won twice against the same team.

In the 2013 World Baseball Classic, Venezuela was eliminated by Puerto Rico, who went on to eliminate Italy, the United States and two-time defending champion Japan. Their placing as the third team in Pool C after defeating newcomers Spain was sufficient to secure direct qualification to the 2017 World Baseball Classic.

The team competed against Team Israel, Team Puerto Rico, Team Dominican Republic, and Team Nicaragua in the 2023 World Baseball Classic in Miami, Florida, coming in first in the pool, but losing to the U.S. in the next round.

==== 2026 ====
Team Venezuela competed against Team Israel, Team Netherlands, Team Dominican Republic, and Team Nicaragua in pool play of the 2026 World Baseball Classic. They played from 6–17 March 2026, at LoanDepot Park in Miami, Florida, in Pool D.

Houston Astros bench coach Omar López managed Team Venezuela at the 2026 World Baseball Classic.

After an upset victory against Team Japan in the quarterfinals, a victory against the insurgent Team Italy in the semifinals, the Venezuela national team won their first World Baseball Classic final against Team USA, 3–2.

=== Olympics era ===
As one of the Latin American baseball powerhouses, Venezuela remarkably has not competed in the Olympics tournament which began from 1992 Summer Olympics in Barcelona, unlike more famous teams such as Dominican Republic and Puerto Rico.

==== 2028 ====
The 2026 World Baseball Classic is the first tournament in any sport to have 2028 Summer Olympics qualification quota spots directly available, in this case for the top-two-performing Americas teams excluding Olympic hosts the United States, who have already qualified automatically.

On 14 March 2026, after securing a vital victory against Japan in the quarterfinals, Venezuela qualified for the historically first time in the six-team baseball tournament for LA28.

== Current roster ==
Venezuela roster – 2026 World Baseball Classic
Players		Coaching staff
Pitchers: 58 Luinder Avila; 83 Eduard Bazardo; 70 José Buttó; 37 Enmanuel De Jesus; 74 Jhonathan Díaz; 20 Carlos Guzmán; 94 Yoendrys Gómez; 30 Andrés Machado; 35 Anthony Molina; 53 Keider Montero; 29 Daniel Palencia; 52 Eduardo Rodriguez; 34 Antonio Senzatela; 73 Christian Suarez; 55 Ranger Suárez; 64 Ricardo Sánchez; 61 Ángel Zerpa	Catchers: 23 William Contreras; 13 Salvador Pérez; Infielders: 2 Luis Arraez; 40 Willson Contreras; 11 Maikel Garcia; 0 Andrés Giménez; 7 Eugenio Suárez; 25 Gleyber Torres; 14 Ezequiel Tovar; Outfielders: 16 Wilyer Abreu; 21 Ronald Acuña Jr.; 1 Jackson Chourio; 4 Javier Sanoja	Manager: 22 Omar López; Coaches: 28 Robinson Chirinos (bench); 24 Miguel Cabrera (hitting); 38 Carlos Mendez (hitting); 15 Jorge Córdova (pitching); 57 Johan Santana (pitching); 8 Gerardo Parra (first base); 12 Rouglas Odor (third base); 85 Javier Bracamonte (bullpen catcher); 59 Juan Graterol (bullpen catcher); 51 Victor Martinez (assistant); 99 Néstor Corredor (batting practice pitcher); Roster

== Results and fixtures ==
The following is a list of professional baseball match results currently active in the latest version of the WBSC World Rankings, as well as any future matches that have been scheduled.

Legend

Win Lose Void or postponed Fixture

=== 2019 ===
WBSC Premier12 GS	5 November	Venezuela	4–8	Japan	Taoyuan Stadium, Taiwan
WBSC Premier12 GS	18:00 NST		Boxscore		Attendance: 3,868

WBSC Premier12 GS	6 November	Chinese Taipei	3–0	Venezuela	Taichung Stadium, Taiwan
WBSC Premier12 GS	18:30 NST		Boxscore		Attendance: 10,983

WBSC Premier12 GS	7 November	Venezuela	7–1	Puerto Rico	Taichung Stadium, Taiwan
WBSC Premier12 GS	12:00 NST		Boxscore		Attendance: 618

=== 2022 ===
Bolivarian Games RR	30 June	Venezuela	9–2	Dominican Republic	Estadio Calamar, Colombia
Bolivarian Games RR	14:00 COT		Boxscore

Bolivarian Games RR	1 July	Venezuela	4–5	Peru	Estadio Calamar, Colombia
Bolivarian Games RR	14:00 COT		Boxscore		Attendance: 2,450

Bolivarian Games RR	2 July	Colombia	10–0 (F/6)	Venezuela	Estadio Calamar, Colombia
Bolivarian Games RR	19:00 COT		Boxscore

Bolivarian Games RR	3 July	Dominican Republic	14–2	Venezuela	Estadio Calamar, Colombia
Bolivarian Games RR	14:00 COT		Boxscore

Bolivarian Games RR	4 July	Peru	5–6	Venezuela	Estadio Calamar, Colombia
Bolivarian Games RR	14:00 COT		Boxscore

Bolivarian Games RR	5 July	Venezuela	7–1	Colombia	Estadio Calamar, Colombia
Bolivarian Games RR	14:00 COT		Boxscore

=== 2023 ===
World Baseball Classic GS	11 March	Dominican Republic	1–5	Venezuela	loanDepot Park, United States
World Baseball Classic GS	19:00 ET	LP: Sandy Alcántara (0–1)	Boxscore	WP: José Ruiz (1–0); HR: Anthony Santander (1)	Attendance: 35,890; Umpires: HP – Andy Fletcher, 1B – Tim Meyer, 2B – Ron Kulpa, 3B – Maikol Tibabijo

World Baseball Classic GS	12 March	Venezuela	9–6	Puerto Rico	loanDepot Park, United States
World Baseball Classic GS	19:00 ET	WP: Pablo López (1–0); Sv: Silvino Bracho (1); HR: Anthony Santander (2), Salvador Pérez (1)	Boxscore	LP: José Berríos (0–1); HR: Eddie Rosario (1)	Attendance: 35,615; Umpires: HP – Chris Guccione, 1B – Chris Graham, 2B – Alejandro Pecero, 3B – Mike Estabrook

World Baseball Classic GS	14 March	Nicaragua	1–4	Venezuela	loanDepot Park, United States
World Baseball Classic GS	12:00 ET	LP: Rodney Theophile (0–1)	Boxscore	WP: José Ruiz (1–0); Sv: José Alvarado (1)	Attendance: 21,873; Umpires: HP – Ángel Hernández, 1B – Chris Guccione, 2B – Alejandro Pecero, 3B – Tim Meyer

World Baseball Classic GS	15 March	Venezuela	5–1	Israel	loanDepot Park, United States
World Baseball Classic GS	12:00 ET	WP: Jesús Luzardo (1–0); HR: Eduardo Escobar (1), Eugenio Suárez (1)	Boxscore	LP: Robert Stock (0–1)	Attendance: 18,277; Umpires: HP – Andy Fletcher, 1B – Ángel Hernández, 2B – Maikol Tibabijo, 3B – Alejandro Pecero

World Baseball Classic QF	18 March	United States	9–7	Venezuela	loanDepot Park, United States
World Baseball Classic QF	19:00 ET	WP: David Bednar (1–0); Sv: Ryan Pressly (2); HR: Kyle Tucker (1), Trea Turner (2)	Boxscore	LP: José Quijada (0–1); HR: Luis Arráez (1), Luis Arráez (2)	Attendance: 35,792; Umpires: HP – Dan Bellino, 1B – Will Little, 2B – Atsushi Fukaya, 3B – Kun Young Park

Central American and Caribbean Games GS	24 June	Puerto Rico	3–4	Venezuela	Parque nacional de Pelota Saturnino Bengoa, El Salvador
Central American and Caribbean Games GS	13:00 CST		Boxscore

Central American and Caribbean Games GS	25 June	Venezuela	5–2	Dominican Republic	Parque nacional de Pelota Saturnino Bengoa, El Salvador
Central American and Caribbean Games GS	9:30 CST		Boxscore

Central American and Caribbean Games GS	27 June	Curaçao	4–3	Venezuela	Parque nacional de Pelota Saturnino Bengoa, El Salvador
Central American and Caribbean Games GS	14:30 CST		Boxscore

Central American and Caribbean Games GS	28 June	Venezuela	4–1	Nicaragua	Parque nacional de Pelota Saturnino Bengoa, El Salvador
Central American and Caribbean Games GS	14:10 CST		Boxscore

Central American and Caribbean Games GS	30 June	El Salvador	3–4 (F/8)	Venezuela	Parque nacional de Pelota Saturnino Bengoa, El Salvador
Central American and Caribbean Games GS	11:00 CST		Boxscore

Central American and Caribbean Games GS	30 June	Mexico	11–1 (F/5)	Venezuela	Parque nacional de Pelota Saturnino Bengoa, El Salvador
Central American and Caribbean Games GS	17:00 CST		Boxscore

Central American and Caribbean Games GS	1 July	Venezuela	4–11	Cuba	Parque nacional de Pelota Saturnino Bengoa, El Salvador
Central American and Caribbean Games GS	10:00 CST		Boxscore

Central American and Caribbean Games 3rd	1 July	Dominican Republic	7–8	Venezuela	Parque nacional de Pelota Saturnino Bengoa, El Salvador
Central American and Caribbean Games 3rd	13:30 CST	LP: Hansel Paulino	Boxscore	WP: Eduardo Paredes

Pan American Games GS	19 October	Venezuela	1–3	Brazil	Parque Bicentenario, Chile
Pan American Games GS	15:00 CLT		Boxscore

Pan American Games GS	22 October	Cuba	5–6	Venezuela	Parque Bicentenario, Chile
Pan American Games GS	15:00 CLT		Boxscore

Pan American Games GS	24 October	Colombia	6–2	Venezuela	Parque Bicentenario, Chile
Pan American Games GS	15:00 CLT		Boxscore

Pan American Games 7th	25 October	Chile	0–7	Venezuela	Parque Bicentenario, Chile
Pan American Games 7th	9:30 CLT		Boxscore

=== 2024 ===
WBSC Premier12 GS	9 November	Venezuela	8–4	Mexico	Estadio Panamericano, Mexico
WBSC Premier12 GS	20:00 CST		Boxscore		Attendance: 9,758

WBSC Premier12 GS	10 November	Venezuela	2–4	Panama	Estadio Panamericano, Mexico
WBSC Premier12 GS	13:00 CST		Boxscore		Attendance: 414

WBSC Premier12 GS	11 November	United States	3–5	Venezuela	Coloso del Pacífico, Mexico
WBSC Premier12 GS	19:00 CST		Boxscore		Attendance: 7,018

WBSC Premier12 GS	13 November	Puerto Rico	2–5	Venezuela	Estadio Panamericano, Mexico
WBSC Premier12 GS	13:00 CST		Boxscore		Attendance: 533

WBSC Premier12 GS	14 November	Netherlands	0–11 (F/7)	Venezuela	Estadio Panamericano, Mexico
WBSC Premier12 GS	13:00 CST		Boxscore		Attendance: 239

WBSC Premier12 SR	21 November	Chinese Taipei	0–2	Venezuela	Tokyo Dome, Japan
WBSC Premier12 SR	12:00 JST		Boxscore		Attendance: 6,790

WBSC Premier12 SR	22 November	Venezuela	6–9	Japan	Tokyo Dome, Japan
WBSC Premier12 SR	19:00 JST		Boxscore		Attendance: 33,300

WBSC Premier12 SR	23 November	United States	6–5	Venezuela	Tokyo Dome, Japan
WBSC Premier12 SR	12:00 JST		Boxscore		Attendance: 8,868

WBSC Premier12 3rd	24 November	United States	6–1	Venezuela	Tokyo Dome, Japan
WBSC Premier12 3rd	12:00 JST		Boxscore		Attendance: 8,386

=== 2026 ===
World Baseball Classic GS	6 March	Netherlands	2–6	Venezuela	loanDepot Park, United States
World Baseball Classic GS	12:00 EST	LP: Antwone Kelly (0–1)	Boxscore	WP: Ranger Suárez (1–0); HR: Javier Sanoja (1)	Attendance: 19,542; Umpires: HP – Shane Livensparger, 1B – Michael Ulloa, 2B – Gabe Morales, 3B – Trent Thomas

World Baseball Classic GS	7 March	Israel	3–11	Venezuela	loanDepot Park, United States
World Baseball Classic GS	19:00 EST	LP: Ben Simon (0–1); HR: Harrison Bader (1), RJ Schreck (1)	Boxscore	WP: Enmanuel De Jesus (1–0); HR: Luis Arráez (1, 2), Eugenio Suárez (1)	Attendance: 22,573; Umpires: HP – Gabe Morales, 1B – Marek Vicar, 2B – Paul Clemons, 3B – Michael Ulloa

World Baseball Classic GS	9 March	Venezuela	4–0	Nicaragua	loanDepot Park, United States
World Baseball Classic GS	19:00 EDT	WP: Yoendrys Gómez (1–0); HR: Ronald Acuña Jr. (1)	Boxscore	LP: Danilo Bermúdez (0–1)	Attendance: 27,844; Umpires: HP – Paul Clemons, 1B – Alejandro Percero, 2B – Lance Barksdale, 3B – Trent Thomas

World Baseball Classic GS	11 March	Dominican Republic	7–5	Venezuela	loanDepot Park, United States
World Baseball Classic GS	20:00 EDT	WP: Sandy Alcántara (1–0); Sv: Elvis Alvarado (1); HR: Juan Soto (2), Ketel Marte (1), Vladimir Guerrero Jr. (2), Fernando Tatís Jr. (1)	Boxscore	LP: Eduardo Rodríguez (0–1)	Attendance: 36,230; Umpires: HP – Gabe Morales, 1B – Marek Vicar, 2B – Paul Clemons, 3B – Michael Ulloa

World Baseball Classic QF	14 March	Venezuela	8–5	Japan	loanDepot Park, United States
World Baseball Classic QF	20:00 EDT	WP: Enmanuel De Jesus (2–0); Sv: Daniel Palencia (1); HR: Ronald Acuña Jr. (2), Maikel García (1), Wilyer Abreu (1)	Boxscore	LP: Hiromi Itoh (0–1); HR: Shohei Ohtani (3), Shōta Morishita (1)	Attendance: 34,548; Umpires: HP – Chris Segal, 1B – Dan Iassogna, 2B – Maikol Tibibijo, 3B – Tim Meyer

World Baseball Classic SF	16 March	Venezuela	4–2	Italy	loanDepot Park, United States
World Baseball Classic SF	20:00 EDT	WP: Ángel Zerpa (1–0); Sv: Daniel Palencia (2); HR: Eugenio Suárez (2)	Boxscore	LP: Michael Lorenzen (1–1)	Attendance: 35,382; Umpires: HP – Jeremie Rehak, 1B – Dan Bellino, 2B – Cory Blaser, 3B – Cuti Suarez, LF – Chris Graham, RF – Delfin Colon

World Baseball Classic F	17 March	Venezuela	3–2	United States	loanDepot Park, United States
World Baseball Classic F	20:00 EDT	WP: Andrés Machado (1–0); Sv: Daniel Palencia (3); HR: Wilyer Abreu (2)	Boxscore	LP: Garrett Whitlock (0–1); HR: Bryce Harper (1)	Attendance: 36,190; Umpires: HP – Dan Bellino, 1B – Cory Blaser, 2B – Jeremie Rehak, 3B – Chris Graham, LF – Delfin Colon, RF – Cuti Suarez

== Tournament record ==
=== World Baseball Classic ===
In June 2005, Major League Baseball announced the formation of the World Baseball Classic, a sixteen nation international competition to be held in March 2006 for the first time. The team Venezuela sent to the 2006 and 2009 World Baseball Classic included Venezuelan players from Major League Baseball. A player is eligible to participate on a WBC national team if:

- The player is a citizen of the nation the team represents.
- The player is qualified for citizenship or to hold a passport under the laws of a nation represented by a team, but has not been granted citizenship or been issued a passport, then the player may be made eligible by WBCI upon petition by the player or team.
- The player is a permanent legal resident of the nation or territory the team represents.
- The player was born in the nation or territory the team represents.
- The player has one parent who is, or if deceased was, a citizen of the nation the team represents.
- The player has one parent who was born in the nation or territory the team represents.

World Baseball Classic record							Qualification record			
Year	Round	Position	W	L	RS	RA	W	L	RS	RA
(Puerto Rico) (United States) 2006	Quarterfinals	7th	3	3	22	20	No qualifiers held			
(Canada) (United States) 2009	Third place	(bronze) 3rd	6	2	45	36	No qualifiers held			
(Puerto Rico) 2013	Group stage	10th	1	2	17	21	Automatically qualified			
(Mexico) (United States) 2017	Quarterfinals	8th	2	5	28	55	Automatically qualified			
(United States) 2023	Quarterfinals	5th	4	1	30	18	Automatically qualified			
(United States) 2026	Champions	1st	6	1	41	21	Automatically qualified			
Total	Semifinals	6/6	24	14	183	171	—	—	—	—

=== Olympic Games ===
Summer Olympics record								Qualification record
Year	Round	Position	W	L	%	RS	RA	Method
(Spain) 1992	Did not qualify							Did not enter
(United States) 1996	Did not qualify							Did not enter
(Australia) 2000	Did not qualify							Did not enter
(Greece) 2004	Did not qualify							Withdrew from qualification
(China) 2008	Did not qualify							5th, Americas Qualifying Tournament
(Japan) 2020	Did not qualify							Final Qualifying Tournament
(United States) 2028	Qualified							2026 World Baseball Classic
Total	Preliminary	1/7	0	0	.000	0	0	

=== WBSC Premier12 ===
WBSC Premier12 record
Year	Round	Position	Pld	W	L	RS	RA	Squad	Ranking
(Japan) 2015	Group stage	10th	5	2	3	26	36	Squad	10th
(Japan) 2019	Opening Round	7th	3	1	2	11	12	Squad	9th
(Mexico) 2024	Fourth Place	4th	9	5	4	45	34	Squad	6th
2027	To be determined								
Total	0 Titles	3/3	17	8	9	82	82	—	

=== Baseball World Cup (1938–2011) ===
Amateur World Series & Baseball World Cup record
Year	Result	Position	Pld	W	L	%	RS	RA	Org.
(United Kingdom) 1938	Did not participate								IBF
(Cuba) 1939	Did not participate								IBF
(Cuba) 1940	Single-table tournament	4th	12	5	7	.417			IBF
(Cuba) 1941	Single-table tournament	1st	9	8	1	.889			IBF
(Cuba) 1942	Single-table tournament	3rd	12	7	5	.583			IBF
(Cuba) 1943	Did not participate								IBF
(Venezuela) 1944	Single-table tournament	1st	12	9	3	.750			FIBA
(Venezuela) 1945	Single-table tournament	1st	10	10	0	1.000			FIBA
(Colombia) 1947	Single-table tournament	5th	8	5	3	.625			FIBA
(Nicaragua) 1948	Did not participate								FIBA
(Nicaragua) 1950	Single-table tournament	3rd	11	9	2	.818			FIBA
(Mexico) 1951	Single-table tournament	2nd	13	11	2	.846			FIBA
(Cuba) 1952	Single-table tournament	6th	10	5	5	.500			FIBA
(Venezuela) 1953	Single-table tournament	2nd	10	9	1	.900			FIBA
(Costa Rica) 1961	Single-table tournament	3rd	6	6	3	.667			FIBA
(Colombia) 1965	Did not participate								FIBA
(Dominican Republic) 1969	Single-table tournament	4th	10	7	3	.700			FIBA
(Colombia) 1970	Single-table tournament	5th	11	7	4	.636			FIBA
(Cuba) 1971	Did not participate								FIBA
(Nicaragua) 1972	Did not participate								FIBA
(Cuba) 1973	Single-table tournament	3rd	14	10	4	.714			FIBA
(Nicaragua) 1973	Did not participate								FEMBA
(United States) 1974	Did not participate								FEMBA
(Colombia) 1976	Did not participate								AINBA
(Italy) 1978	Did not participate								AINBA
(Japan) 1980	Single-table tournament	7th	11	4	7	.364			AINBA
(South Korea) 1982	Did not participate								IBAF
(Cuba) 1984	Did not participate								IBAF
(Netherlands) 1986	Single-table tournament	7th	11	5	6	.455	63	73	IBAF
(Italy) 1988	Did not qualify								IBAF
(Canada) 1990	Group stage	12th	8	1	7	.125	33	63	IBAF
(Nicaragua) 1994	Did not qualify								IBAF
(Italy) 1998	Did not qualify								IBAF
(Taiwan) 2001	Did not qualify								IBAF
(Cuba) 2003	Did not qualify								IBAF
(Netherlands) 2005	Did not qualify								IBAF
(Taiwan) 2007	Group stage	12th	7	2	5	.286	33	37	IBAF
(Italy) 2009	7th place game	7th	15	9	6	.600	70	58	IBAF
(Panama) 2011	7th place game	7th	12	6	6	.500	52	91	IBAF
Total	3 Titles	24/38	249	177	80	.689	—	—	

=== Pan American Games ===
- 1955 : (bronze) 3rd
- 1959 : (gold) 1st
- 1975 : (bronze) 3rd

=== Bolivarian Games ===
- 1938 : (gold) 1st
- 1947 : (silver) 2nd
- 1951 : (gold) 1st
- 1961 : (gold) 1st
- 1965 : (gold) 1st
- 1970 : (gold) 1st

- 1973 : (silver) 2nd
- 1981 : (gold) 1st
- 1985 : (gold) 1st
- 1989 : (gold) 1st
- 2001 : (silver) 2nd
- 2009 : (silver) 2nd
- 2013 : (silver) 2nd

- 2017 : (bronze) 3rd
- 2022 : (bronze) 3rd
- 2025 : (bronze) 3rd

=== U-23 Baseball World Cup ===
- Gold: 2021, 2026
- Bronze: 2018

== Players ==
- 2006 World Baseball Classic
- 2009 World Baseball Classic
- 2013 World Baseball Classic

== Managers ==
Manager	Nat.	Years active	Competitions	Ref.
Manuel Capote	(Venezuela)	1940	1940 Amateur World Series — 5th place	
Manuel Malpica	(Venezuela)	1941–1947	1941 Amateur World Series — Champions; 1942 Amateur World Series — 3rd place 1947 Amateur World Series — 6th place	
José Antonio Casanova	(Venezuela)	1944–1959	1944 Amateur World Series — Champions; 1945 Amateur World Series — Champions; 1953 Amateur World Series — Runners-up; 1954 Central American and Caribbean Games — Champions; 1959 Pan American Games — Champions	
Luis Baroni	(Venezuela)	1951	1951 Amateur World Series — Runners-up	
Daniel Canónico	(Venezuela)	1952	1952 Amateur World Series — 6th place	
José Manuel Tovar	(Venezuela)	1961	1961 Amateur World Series — 3rd place	
Pompeyo Davalillo	(Venezuela)	1969–1979	1969 Amateur World Series — 4th place 1979 Pan American Games	
Osvaldo Castellanos	(Cuba)	1973	1973 FIBA Amateur World Series — 3rd place	
Remigio Hermoso	(Venezuela)	1983	1983 Pan American Games — 4th place	
José Piovan	(Venezuela)	1986	1986 Amateur World Series — 3rd place	
Pedro Ávila	(Venezuela)	1987	1987 Pan American Games — 7th place	
Domingo Carrasquel	(Venezuela)	1990	1990 Baseball World Cup — 12th place	
Otilio Chourio	(Venezuela)	2001	2001 Bolivarian Games	
Luis Sojo	(Venezuela)	2006–2015	2006 World Baseball Classic – 7th place 2009 World Baseball Classic – 3rd place 2011 Baseball World Cup – 7th place 2013 World Baseball Classic – 10th place 2015 WBSC Premier12 – 10th place	
Henry Campos	(Venezuela)	2007	2007 Pan American Games; 2010 South American Games	
Omar Vizquel	(Venezuela)	2017	2017 World Baseball Classic – 8th place	
Edwin Hurtado	(Venezuela)	2017–2018	2017 Bolivarian Games; 2018 Central American and Caribbean Games	
Carlos Subero	(Venezuela)	2019	2019 WBSC Premier12	
José Alguacil	(Venezuela)	2021	2020 Summer Olympic qualifiers	
Omar López	(Venezuela)	2023–2026	2023 World Baseball Classic — Quarterfinals; 2024 WBSC Premier12 — 4th place 2026 World Baseball Classic — Champions	
Carlos García	(Venezuela)	2023	2023 Central American and Caribbean Games — 4th place	
Oswaldo Navarro	(Venezuela)	2025	2025 Bolivarian Games — 3rd place	

== Uniform ==
Home

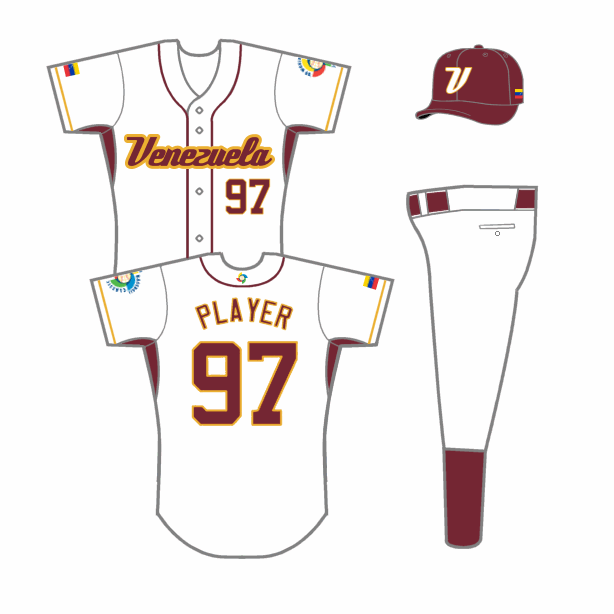
2013 WBC Home Kit

Away

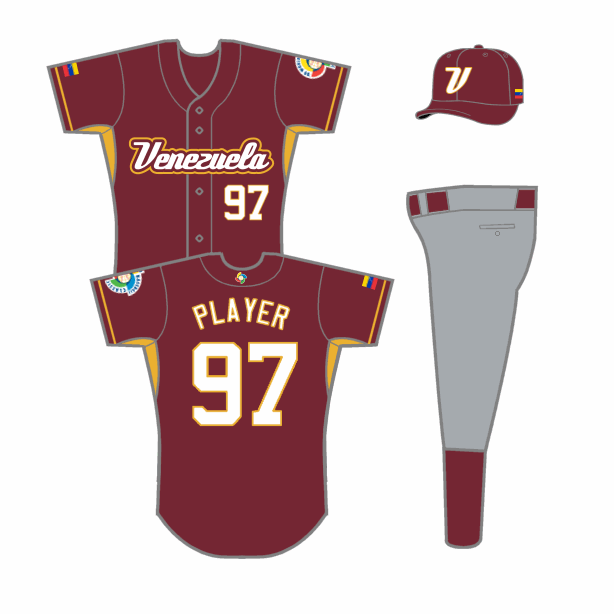
2013 WBC Away Kit

== See also ==
- Players from Venezuela in MLB
