= Reynaldo Rodríguez =

Colombian baseball player (born 1986)

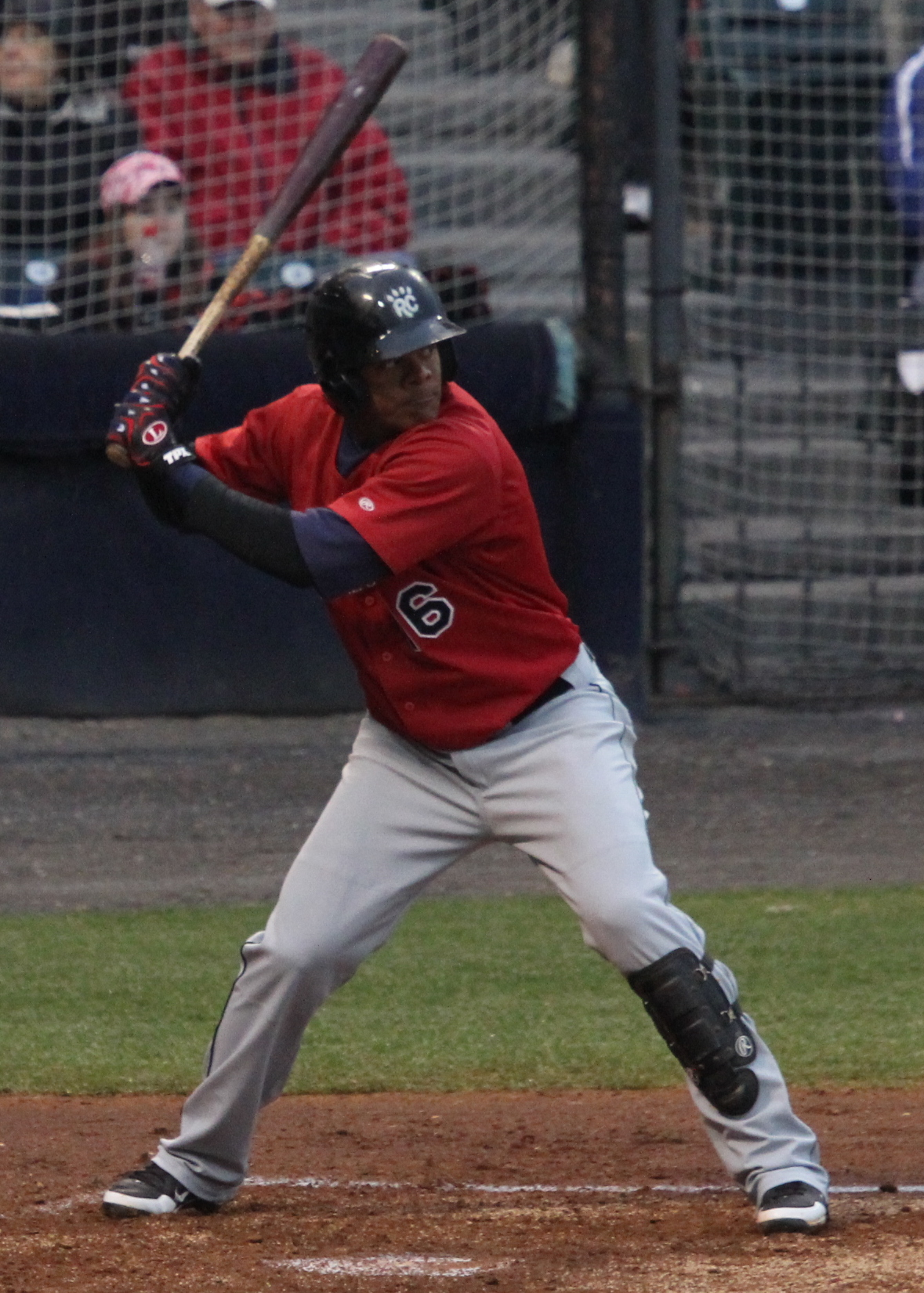
- Rodríguez with the New Britain Rock Cats in 2013

Caliente de Durango – No. 17
- First baseman / Outfielder
- Born: July 2, 1986 (age 40); Cartagena, Colombia
- Bats: Right Throws: Right
- Stats at Baseball Reference
Medals
Men's baseball
Representing Colombia
Central American and Caribbean Games
| Bronze medal – third place | 2018 Barranquilla | Team |

Reynaldo A. Rodriguez Corrales (born July 2, 1986) is a Colombian professional baseball first baseman and outfielder for the Caliente de Durango of the Mexican League.

== Professional career ==
=== New York Yankees ===
On November 23, 2003, Rodríguez signed with the New York Yankees as an international free agent. He made his professional debut in 2006 with the Gulf Coast League Yankees, and spent the next season performing well in rookie ball, hitting .349/.401/.589 with three home runs and 26 RBI for the Dominican Summer League Yankees. After beginning the 2008 campaign with an injury, Rodríguez was released by the Yankees organization.

=== Yuma Scorpions ===
Rodríguez returned to Colombia where he played in 2008 before being signed by the Yuma Scorpions of the independent Golden Baseball League for the 2009 season. He had a breakout year in 2009, hitting .335/.380/.486 with six home runs, 48 RBI, and 18 stolen bases across 74 appearances. Following the season, Rodríguez headed Baseball America's Independent League Top Prospects List.

=== Boston Red Sox ===
On October 15, 2009, Rodríguez's contract was purchased by the Boston Red Sox organization. He spent the 2010 season with the Single–A Greenville Drive, playing in 85 games and hitting .281/.387/.518 with 14 home runs, 59 RBI, and 12 stolen bases.

Rodríguez split the 2011 season between the rookie–level Gulf Coast League Red Sox, Low–A Lowell Spinners, High–A Salem Red Sox, and Double–A Portland Sea Dogs. In 110 games between the four affiliates, he accumulated a .286/.355/.526 slash line with 18 home runs, 77 RBI, and 14 stolen bases.

Rodríguez spent the 2012 campaign with Portland and the Triple–A Pawtucket Red Sox, compiling a .249/.326/.476 batting line with 16 home runs and 53 RBI. He elected free agency following the season on November 2, 2012.

=== Minnesota Twins ===
On December 7, 2012, Rodríguez signed a minor league contract with the Minnesota Twins. He spent the ensuing season with the Double–A New Britain Rock Cats, hitting .231 with 21 home runs and an OPS of .787 in 121 games. In 2014, he continued his hot hitting, posting 20 home runs and an .870 OPS while batting .293 in 122 games before being promoted to the Triple–A Rochester Red Wings. Rodríguez spent the entirety of 2015 with Rochester, and was named the MVP following the season, in which he hit .255/.307/.446 with 16 home runs, 80 RBI, and 13 stolen bases across 132 games.

On April 28, 2016, Rodríguez was suspended for 80 games after he tested positive for Stanozolol, a performance-enhancing drug. On the year, he made 54 appearances split between Rochester and the High–A Fort Myers Miracle, logging a slash line of .226/.314/.360 with six home runs and 14 RBI. Rodríguez elected free agency following the season on November 7.

On December 21, 2016, Rodríguez re–signed with the Twins on a minor league contract. He was released by the organization prior to the season on March 29, 2017.

=== Bravos de León ===
On April 12, 2017, Rodríguez signed with the Bravos de León of the Mexican League. In 17 games, he batted .206/.296/.254 with one home run, two RBI, and five stolen bases. Rodríguez was released by León on May 2.

=== Winnipeg Goldeyes ===
On March 9, 2018, Rodríguez signed with the Winnipeg Goldeyes of the independent American Association. In 23 games, he hit .281/.359/.449 with three home runs and 17 RBI. Rodríguez was released by Winnipeg following the signing of Dave Sappelt on June 12.

On June 15, 2018, Rodríguez signed with the Fargo-Moorhead RedHawks of the American Association of Independent Professional Baseball. He did not play in a game for Fargo before he was released by the team on March 12, 2019.

=== Tigres de Quintana Roo ===
On May 26, 2019, Rodríguez signed with the Tigres de Quintana Roo of the Mexican League. In 63 games down the stretch, he slashed .367/.420/.738 with 24 home runs and 79 RBI. Rodríguez did not play in a game in 2020 due to the cancellation of the Mexican League season because of the COVID-19 pandemic.

He returned to action in 2021, playing in 63 games and hitting .291/.349/.423 with four home runs, 38 RBI, and 21 stolen bases. In 2022 for Quintana Roo, Rodríguez batted .327/.361/.579 with 19 home runs, 71 RBI, and 17 stolen bases in 86 contests.

=== Guerreros de Oaxaca ===
On June 21, 2024, Rodríguez was traded to the Guerreros de Oaxaca of the Mexican League. In 32 games, he batted .308/.357/.564 with seven home runs and 20 RBI.

Rodríguez returned to Oaxaca for the 2025 season, where he slashed .357/.405/.559 with 11 home runs and 75 RBI across 85 games.

=== Caliente de Durango ===
On January 29, 2026, Rodríguez was traded to the Caliente de Durango of the Mexican League.

== International career ==
Rodríguez represents the Colombian national baseball team. At the 2017 World Baseball Classic, he slashed .143/.143/.143 over 14 at-bats. He also participated in the 2019 Pan American Games Qualifier, and the 2019 Pan American Games.

Rodríguez was not initially selected for the 2023 World Baseball Classic roster, but was added as a replacement for outfielder Tito Polo, who was unable to participate due to visa issues. Over the course of the tournament's pool stage, Rodríguez led the Colombian team in batting average (.313), hits (5), and RBIs (5), and finished with the team's second-best OPS (.876), behind Dilson Herrera. However, the Colombian team was eliminated from the tournament, and would be forced to re-qualify for the 2026 World Baseball Classic.

Rodríguez was named to the Colombian roster for the 2026 World Baseball Classic qualifiers, held in March 2025 in Tucson, Arizona. He went 2-for-7 over three games, and tied with Michael Arroyo to lead the team in walks (3).

== Personal life ==
Rodríguez's grandfather was Inocencio "Yuya" Rodríguez, who was the first Colombian to sign a contract with a Major League Baseball team, doing so with the Baltimore Orioles in 1954. Yuya played in the Orioles, New York Giants, and Detroit Tigers minor league organizations until 1958.
