= Gabe Morales =

American baseball umpire (born 1984)

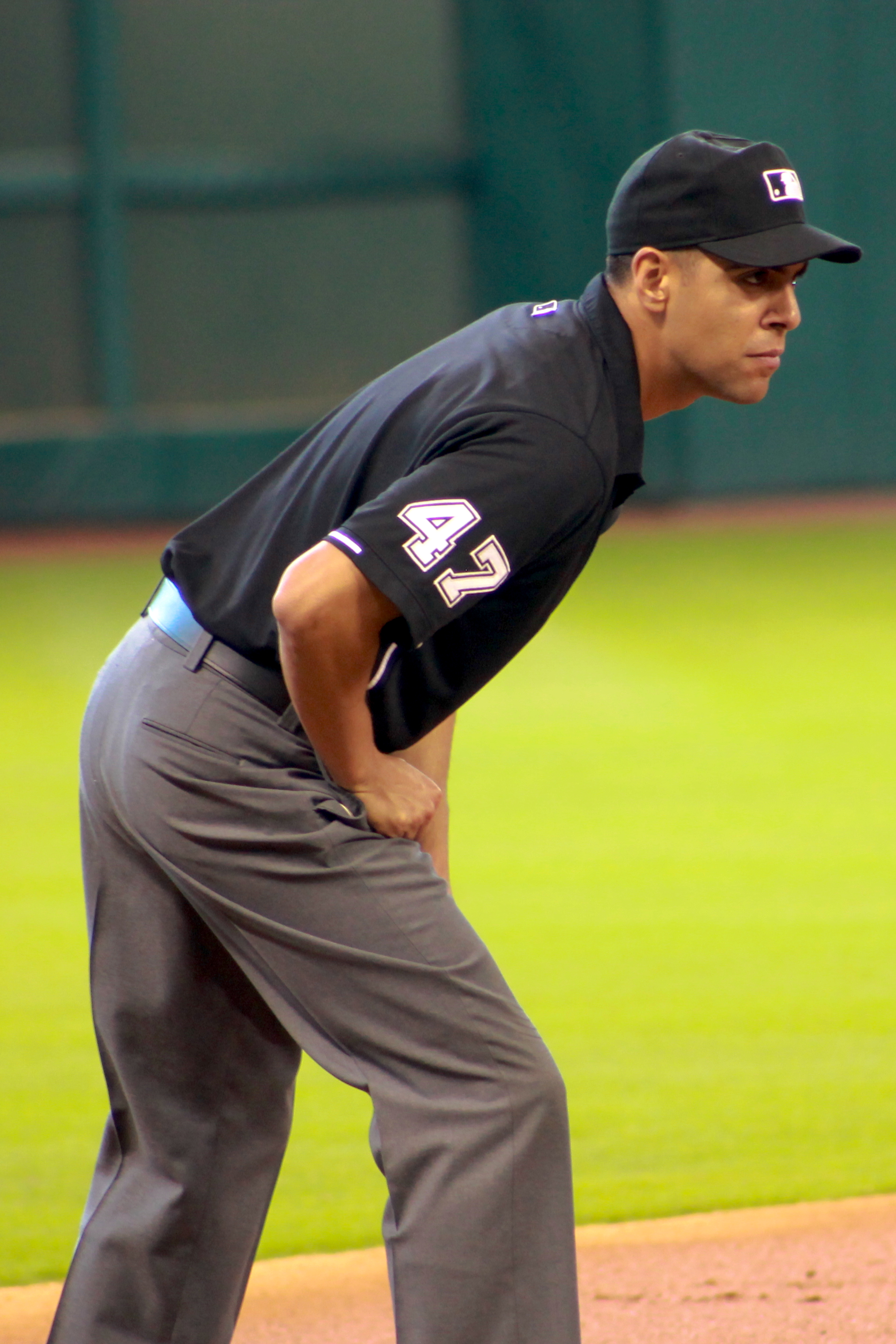
- Morales in 2015

MLB – No. 47
- Umpire
- Born: June 21, 1984 (age 42); Santa Clara, California, U.S.

MLB debut
- April 2, 2014
- Stats at Baseball Reference

Crew information
- Umpiring crew: B
- Crew members: #88 Doug Eddings (crew chief); #76 Mike Muchlinski; #47 Gabe Morales; #82 Emil Jímenez

Career highlights and awards
- Special assignments: World Series (2026); League Championship Series (2024, 2025); Division Series (2021, 2023, 2026); Wild Card Games/Series (2018, 2020, 2025); All-Star Games (2022)

Gabriel Morales (born June 21, 1984) is an American Major League Baseball (MLB) umpire. He wears uniform number 47.

== Career ==
A native of Santa Clara, California, Morales began umpiring Minor League Baseball games in 2009. He made his debut in 2014 and was one of four umpires promoted to the full-time staff in February 2017, upon the retirements of Bob Davidson, John Hirschbeck, Jim Joyce, and Tim Welke.

During the decisive game five of the 2021 National League Division Series between the San Francisco Giants and Los Angeles Dodgers on October 14, 2021, Morales ruled that Giants' batter Wilmer Flores had swung on a pitch, which resulted in a strikeout, ending the game and the series.

Morales said he had seen a replay of the last pitch. Asked whether he still thought it was a swing, crew chief Ted Barrett answered. "Yeah, no, we, yeah, yeah, he doesn't want to say," Barrett said.
