= 1948 Amateur World Series =

10th Amateur World Series, held in Managua, Nicaragua

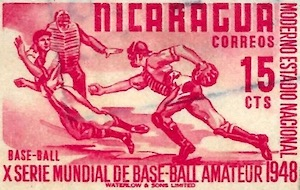

Tournament details
- Country: Nicaragua
- Teams: 8
- Defending champions: Colombia

Final positions
- Champions: Dominican Republic
- Runners-up: Puerto Rico
- Third place: Colombia
- Fourth place: Mexico

Awards
- MVP: (Dominican Republic) Ramón del Monte

The 1948 Amateur World Series was the 10th edition of the Amateur World Series. It was held in Managua, Nicaragua from November 20 through December 12, 1948.

== Participants ==
The usually-powerful Cubans did not field a squad; in the wake of the integration of organized baseball, many top Cuban amateurs had been signed by Major League Baseball teams that had previously refused to sign the darker-skinned Cubans.

Venezuela also did not send its national team, due to strained relations between the Venezuelan government, led by Rómulo Gallegos, and Nicaraguan dictator Anastasio Somoza García. Somoza accused the Venezuelan government of promoting revolutionary groups in Central America. The democratically-elected Gallegos would be removed from power in a military coup on Nov. 24, 1948, midway through the tournament).

== Tournament summary ==
The first pitch, at the new Estadio Nacional in Managua, was supposed to be thrown by the president of Nicaragua, Víctor Manuel Román y Reyes, but he instead allowed Anastasio Somoza García, head of the National Guard and the country's de facto dictator, to throw the first pitch instead. Chale Pereira, Nicaraguan president of the International Baseball Federation, was also present.

After Nicaragua lost a game against Mexico, Nicaraguan dictator Anastasio Somoza fired the team's Cuban manager, Juan Ealo, and took over the reins of the team himself. However, the team still limped to a dismal 1–6 record.

== Final standings ==
Rk	Team	W	L	
1	Dominican Republic	8	1	Gold medal
2	Puerto Rico	6	1	Silver medal
3	Colombia	5	2	Bronze medal
4	Mexico	5	2	
5	Panama	3	4	
6	Guatemala	2	5	
7	Nicaragua	1	6	
8	El Salvador	0	7	
