= Cuban Stars =

Cuban Stars may refer to several teams of Cuban and other Latin American baseball players that competed in Negro league baseball:

- Cuban Stars (West), which played mainly in the midwestern United States from 1907 to 1930
- Cuban Stars (East), which played mainly in the northeastern United States from 1916 to 1929
  - New York Cubans, also known as the New York Cuban Stars, which played from 1935 to 1950 as a reincarnation of the Eastern Cuban Stars
- Pollock's Cuban Stars, which played mainly in the southern United States from 1928 to 1936

== See also ==
- Havana Cubans, a team of Cuban players in the Florida International League billed as the "Cuban All-Stars" at the 1946 Interamerican Series
