= Manuel Capote =

Venezuelan baseball coach (1903–196)

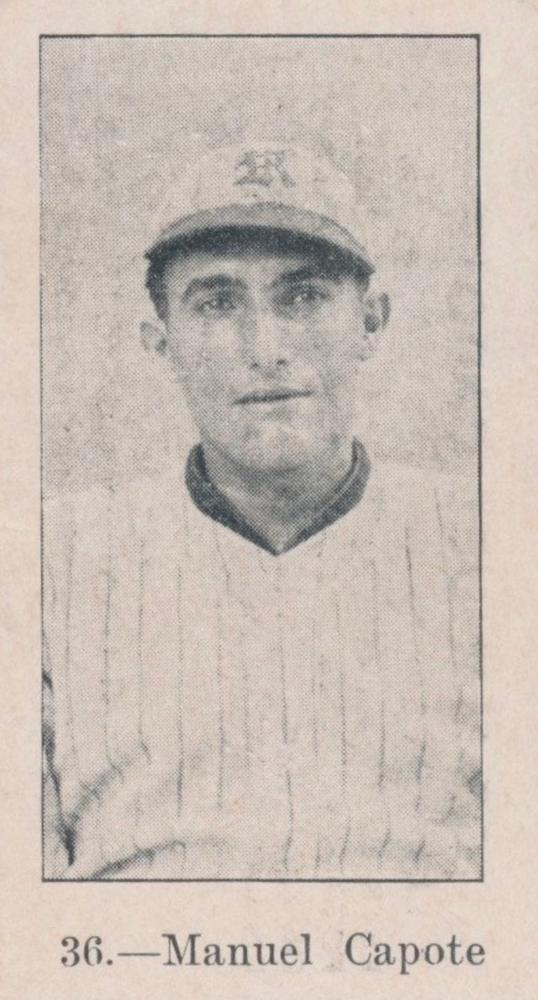
- Left fielder / Manager
- Born: August 3, 1903; Caracas, Venezuela
- Died: June 20, 1963 (aged 59); La Guaira, Venezuela

Manuel Capote (August 3, 1903 — June 20, 1963) was a Venezuelan professional baseball player and manager. He was the first manager to win a game in the Venezuelan Professional Baseball League, skippering Navegantes del Magallanes to a victory over Patriotas de Venezuela in 1946. He was also one of, if not the first manager to lead both of the Eternos Rivales, Magallanes and Caracas.

== Career ==
As a player, Capote was a left fielder with the Royal Criollos club in the early 1930s. He managed the Venezuela club to a championship in the amateur First Division in 1938. He was selected to manage the Venezuela national baseball team at the 1940 Amateur World Series.

In 1942, he became the first manager of Cerveceria Caracas after it was renamed from the previous Cerveceria Princesa. Essentially composed of the same players that had just won the 1941 Amateur World Series for Venezuela, Cerveceria won the 1942–43 First Division, marking the first championship for the future Leones del Caracas. For the 1943-44 season, Capote was hired as manager by Magallanes; the team finished the tournament as champions with 12 wins.

Capote remained the manager of Magallanes when the First Division went professional in 1946; he defeated the Venezuela club in the first game of Venezuelan professional baseball, a 5–2 victory on January 12, 1946, played at the Estadio Cerveza Caracas. His tenure with Magallanes would not last long, as he was replaced by Vidal López on March 2, with a 3–8 record over 11 games. It would be the shortest managerial stint in Venezuelan professional baseball history, until Luis Ugueto (10 games) was fired by the Cardenales de Lara during the 2021–22 season.

Capote is partially responsible for the colloquialism "caimanera" in Venezuelan slang. In 1925, he helped found the "La Caimanera" amateur baseball club; today, the term signifies a pick-up game of baseball, or more broadly, any activity that is spontaneous or improvised.
