= 1947 Amateur World Series =

Tournament details
- Country: Colombia
- Teams: 9

Final positions
- Champions: Colombia
- Runners-up: Puerto Rico
- Third place: Nicaragua
- Fourth place: Mexico

Awards
- MVP: (Puerto Rico) Nino Escalera

The 1947 Amateur World Series was the ninth edition of the Amateur World Series, an international baseball tournament held from November 29 through December 20 in Cartagena de Indias, Colombia.

Colombia won its first world championship title, defeating Puerto Rico in the final game. It was also Puerto Rico's first podium finish in an international baseball tournament; Puerto Rican first baseman Saturnino Escalera was selected as the tournament's most valuable player.

== Participants ==
Venezuela, champions of the previous Amateur World Series held in Caracas in 1945, were once again managed by Manuel Malpica, who had earlier steered the "Heroes of 1941" to a world championship in Cuba.

Puerto Rico was managed by veteran Cesár "Coca" González, and included future major leaguers Valmy Thomas (a Virgin Islander born in Puerto Rico), Nino Escalera, and Roberto Vargas.

The Cuban national team sat out the tournament, due to a dispute over the eligibility of Colombian pitcher Carlos "Petaca" Rodríguez, who the Cuban Amateur Athletic Union alleged had played professional baseball and was thus ineligible. Shortly before the start of the tournament, a committee ruled that the amateur regulations imposed in 1945 were not retroactive, making Rodríguez eligible to play.

== Results ==
Colombia, Nicaragua, and Puerto Rico finished the group stage with identical 6–2 records. Colombia was awarded a bye for the tiebreaker, a Puerto Rico defeated Nicaragua to advance to the gold medal game.

Puerto Rico's Nino Escalera, fresh off his 18th birthday, was selected as the tournament's most valuable player. Though he had already signed a professional contract with the Senadores de San Juan team, he was permitted on the Puerto Rican team due to a rule that you could continue playing amateur ball for two weeks after signing.

== Final standings ==
| Rk | Team | W | L | |
|---|---|---|---|---|
| 1 | Colombia | 7 | 2 | Gold medal |
| 2 | Puerto Rico | 6 | 2 | Silver medal |
| 3 | Nicaragua | 6 | 2 | Bronze medal |
| 4 | Mexico | 5 | 3 | |
| 5 | Venezuela | 5 | 3 | |
| 6 | Panama | 3 | 5 | |
| 7 | El Salvador | 2 | 6 | |
| 8 | Costa Rica | 2 | 6 | |
| 9 | Guatemala | 1 | 7 | |

== Honors and awards ==
=== Statistical leaders ===
Batting leaders
| Statistic | Name | Total |
|---|---|---|
| Batting average | (Venezuela) Fausto Fuenmayor | .483 |
| Hits | (Venezuela) Ramón Fernández | 21 |
| Runs | (Nicaragua) Eduardo Green | 14 |
| Runs | (Nicaragua) J. Hernández | 14 |
| Home runs | (Panama) H. Pessuey | 2 |
| Runs batted in | (Nicaragua) Stanley Cayasso | 12 |
| Stolen bases | (Colombia) Armando Crizón | 6 |

Pitching leaders
| Statistic | Name | Total |
|---|---|---|
| Wins | (Nicaragua) Timothy Mena | 3 |
| Strikeouts | (Puerto Rico) Roberto Vargas | 41 |

=== Awards ===
| Award | Player | Ref. |
|---|---|---|
| Best Batters | (Colombia) Carlos Bustos (Puerto Rico) Saturnino Escalera (Nicaragua) Eduardo Green | |
| Best Pitchers | (Mexico) Patón González (Puerto Rico) Roberto Vargas (Colombia) Manuel Peñaranda (Colombia) Petaca Rodríguez (Colombia) Andres Florez (Nicaragua) Timoteo Mena (Costa Rica) Secundino Bonilla | |
| Most Valuable Player | (Puerto Rico) Saturnino Escalera | |
