= 1973 Amateur World Series (FIBA) =

Tournament details
- Country: Cuba
- Teams: 9
- Defending champions: Cuba

Final positions
- Champions: Cuba (13th title)
- Runners-up: Puerto Rico
- Third place: Venezuela
- Fourth place: Dominican Republic

The 1973 Amateur World Series (AWS) run by the International Baseball Federation (FIBA) was held in Havana, Cuba from November 25 through December 9, 1973. It ran concurrently with the Amateur World Series in Nicaragua held by FEMBA, a breakaway splinter group from FIBA. As a result, most of the national teams from North America and Europe (including the United States, Canada, and Italy) did not participate in the Havana series, since they had joined FEMBA.

This tournament is listed in the history books as "Amateur World Series XXI" or "Baseball World Cup XXI" even though the event numbered "XXII" — the 1973 Nicaragua series — actually had begun and finished earlier. Once the two organizations reconciled later in the decade, the current numbering system was put into place.

== Final standings ==
Rk	Team	Record
1	Cuba	14–0
2	Puerto Rico	10–3
3	Venezuela	10–4
4	Dominican Republic	7–6
5	Panama	6–8
6	Mexico	5–9
7	Netherlands Antilles	3–11
8	Netherlands	0–14
