= Dilson Herrera =

Colombian baseball player (born 1994)

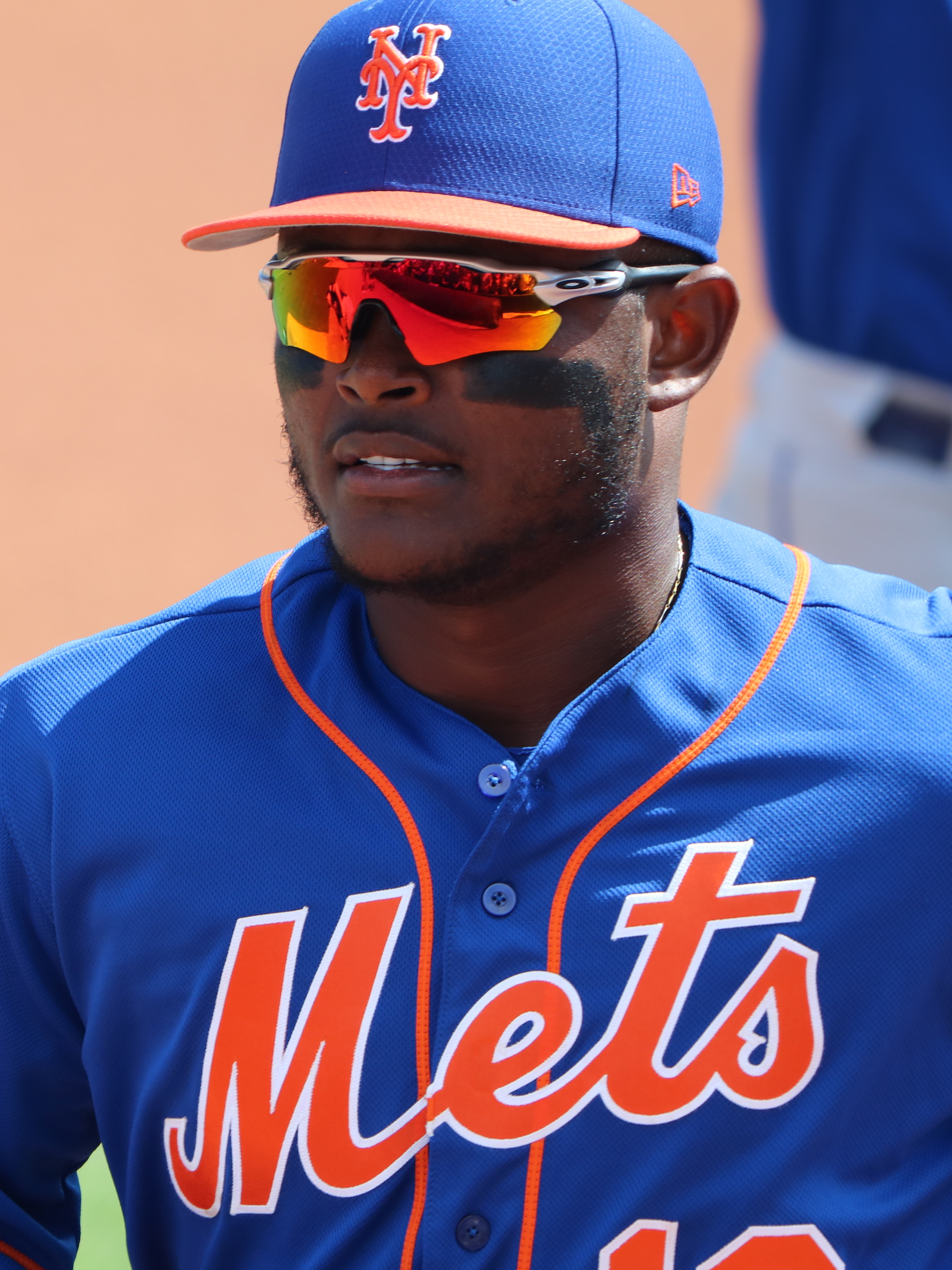
- Herrera with the Mets in 2019
- Second baseman
- Born: March 3, 1994 (age 32); Cartagena, Colombia
- Batted: Right Threw: Right

MLB debut
- August 29, 2014, for the New York Mets

Last MLB appearance
- September 4, 2020, for the Baltimore Orioles

MLB statistics
- Batting average: .199
- Home runs: 11
- Runs batted in: 28
- Stats at Baseball Reference

Teams
- New York Mets (2014–2015); Cincinnati Reds (2018); Baltimore Orioles (2020)
Medals
Men's baseball
Representing Colombia
Pan American Games
Gold medal – first place	2023 Santiago	Team
Bolivarian Games
Gold medal – first place	2017 Santa Marta	Team
Gold medal – first place	2025 Lima-Ayacucho	Team

Dilson José Herrera García (born March 3, 1994) is a Colombian former professional baseball second baseman. He played in Major League Baseball (MLB) for the New York Mets, Cincinnati Reds, and Baltimore Orioles.

== Professional career ==
=== Pittsburgh Pirates ===
Herrera signed with the Pittsburgh Pirates as an international free agent in 2010. He received a $220,000 signing bonus. He then spent the next three years in the Pirates' farm system, advancing as far as the A-class West Virginia Power. Herrera, along with Gregory Polanco, represented the Pirates at the 2013 All-Star Futures Game.

=== New York Mets ===
On August 27, 2013, the Pirates traded Herrera and a player to be named later, Vic Black, to the New York Mets to acquire Marlon Byrd and John Buck. His first season in the Mets organization was a success as he was promoted to Double A during the season.

==== 2014 ====
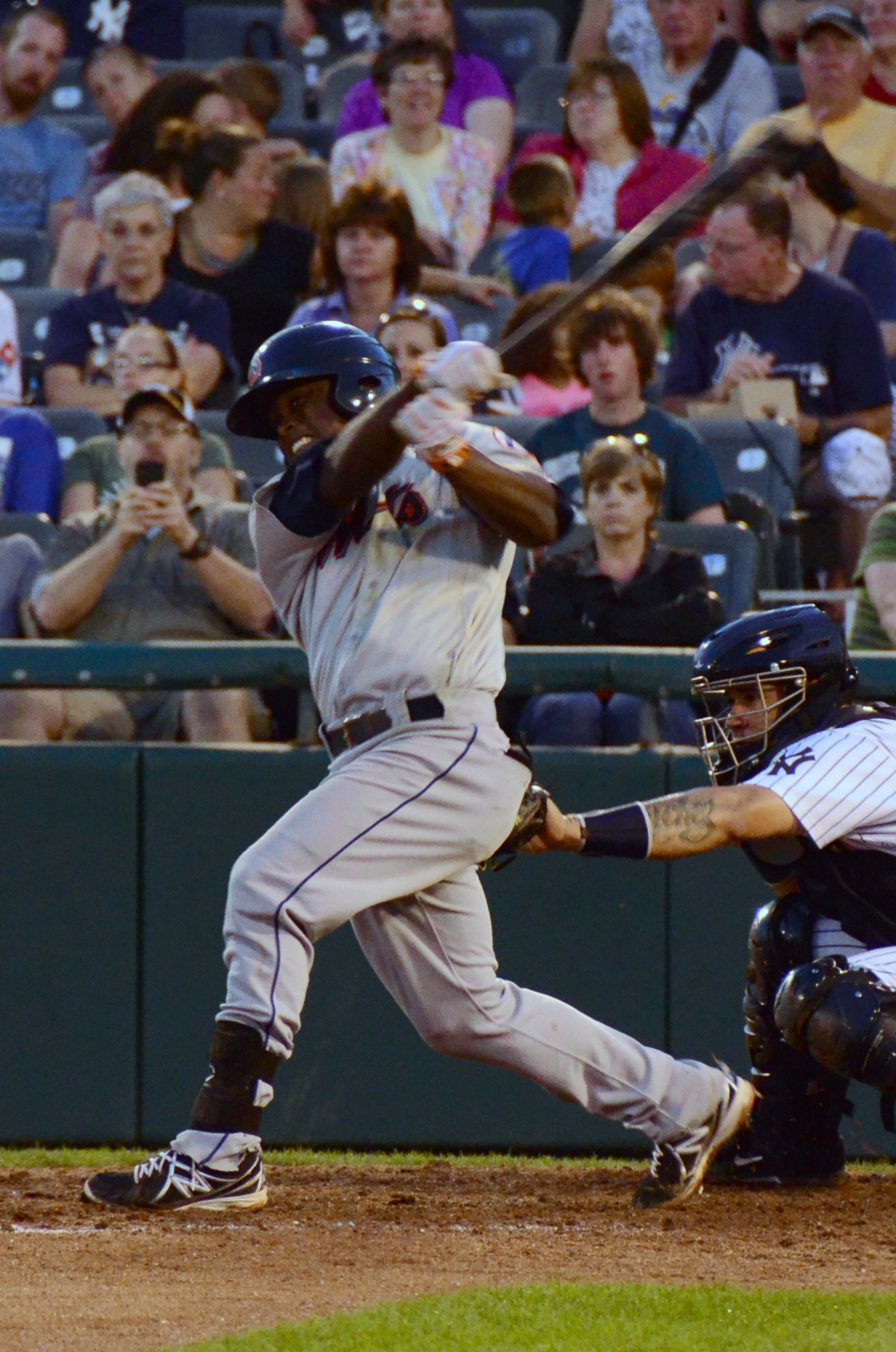
Herrera with the Binghamton Mets in 2014

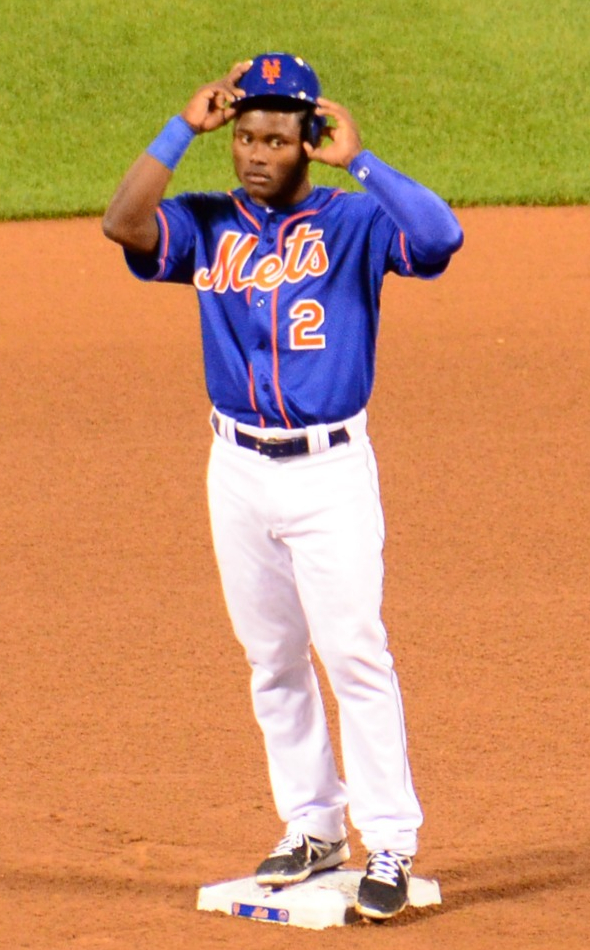
Herrera with the Mets in 2014

On August 28, after an injury to All-Star second baseman Daniel Murphy, Herrera was called up to the majors. He became the first Met ever to start the season in A ball and get to the majors by the end of the season. Two days later, he collected his first major league hit off of the Phillies' Jerome Williams. He received his first RBI in the following game against Justin De Fratus.

On September 1, Herrera hit his first Major League home run, off of Miami Marlins pitcher Henderson Álvarez. Herrera finished the season with appearing in 18 games with a batting average of .220 in 59 at-bats in 66 plate appearances while compiling 13 hits, 11 RBIs, 3 home runs, 7 walks, 6 runs scored and striking out 17 times.

==== 2015 ====
On May 1, Herrera was called up to the Mets as left-handed pitcher Jack Leathersich was sent down to the Las Vegas 51s. Herrera was called up to play second base with Daniel Murphy being moved to third base to stand-in for then-injured third basemen David Wright who was on the disabled list with spinal stenosis. Herrera was placed on the DL on May 15 due to a fractured tip of his middle finger. On June 11, he was reactivated off from the DL. On June 30, Herrera was sent down to the 51s to make room for Daniel Murphy who was coming off the DL.

On September 7, he was recalled up due to the expanded rosters in September. Herrera finished the season appearing in 31 games with a batting average of .211 in 90 at-bats in 103 plate appearances while compiling 19 hits, 6 RBIs, 3 home runs, 11 walks, 7 runs scored, 2 stolen bases, and striking out 23 times.

During the season on June 14, Herrera was seen wearing rally cups with the bottom of the cups cut out on his ears during the bottom half of the sixth inning. The Mets beat the Atlanta Braves 10-8 that day with Dilson going 1 for 3 with one hit, one RBI, one run scored and one walk, with the one hit coming as a home run in the bottom of the 4th inning off Braves pitcher Mike Foltynewicz. The gesture was well received by Mets players and fans.

=== Cincinnati Reds ===
On August 1, 2016, the Mets traded Herrera and Max Wotell to the Cincinnati Reds in exchange for Jay Bruce. He was outrighted to the Triple–A Louisville Bats on March 13, 2018. On July 5, the Reds selected Herrera's contract from the Louisville Bats. He elected free agency on November 3.

=== New York Mets (second stint) ===
On November 29, 2018, the New York Mets signed Herrera to a minor league contract, with an invite to Spring Training. On July 3, 2019, he opted out of his deal with the Mets and was released, making him a free agent. On July 5, he opted back into his minor league deal with the Mets, after having received offers from other minor league teams. On September 1, Herrera once again opted out of his minors deal, making him a free agent.

=== Baltimore Orioles ===
On December 5, 2019, Herrera signed a minor league contract with the Baltimore Orioles. On September 1, 2020, the Orioles selected Herrera to the active roster. Herrera was designated for assignment on September 8 after going hitless with four strikeouts in six plate appearances. He was outrighted on September 12, and elected free agency on September 28. After the 2020 season, he played for Colombia in the 2021 Caribbean Series.

On April 9, 2021, Herrera signed with the Olmecas de Tabasco of the Mexican League.

=== Toronto Blue Jays ===
On April 24, 2021, before the start of the Mexican League season, Herrera signed a minor league contract with the Toronto Blue Jays organization. In 53 games for the Triple-A Buffalo Bisons, Herrera hit .213 with 10 home runs and 27 RBI's. On August 15, 2021, Herrera was released by the Blue Jays.

=== Staten Island FerryHawks ===
On April 13, 2022, Herrera signed with the Staten Island FerryHawks of the Atlantic League of Professional Baseball. In 88 games he hit .255/.338/.374 with 4 home runs, 44 RBIs and 9 stolen bases. He became a free agent following the season.

=== Piratas de Campeche ===
On April 6, 2023, Herrera signed with the Piratas de Campeche of the Mexican League. In 9 games, he batted .200/.300/.257 with 7 hits and 2 RBI. Herrera was released on May 11.

=== El Águila de Veracruz ===
On February 19, 2024, Herrera signed with the Fargo-Moorhead RedHawks of the American Association of Professional Baseball. He did not appear in a game for the team before he was released on May 18.

On July 5, 2024, Herrera signed with El Águila de Veracruz of the Mexican League. In 19 games, he hit .204/.268/.265 with no home runs and three RBI. Herrera was released by Veracruz on December 2.

== International career ==
Herrera was part of the Colombian squad that won the gold medal at the 2023 Pan American Games contested in Santiago, Chile in October 2023. He was named to the Colombian roster for the 2026 World Baseball Classic qualifiers, held in March 2025 in Tucson, Arizona.

== Coaching career ==
On February 4, 2026, the Cleveland Guardians hired Herrera to serve as the manager for the Dominican Summer League Guardians.
