= Time in Puerto Rico =

Puerto Rico uses Atlantic Standard Time throughout the year, with no Daylight Saving Time, due to how close it is to the Equator. This is also true in the United States Virgin Islands. Hence, during the summer, clocks in Puerto Rico match those in New York City and Miami, while during the winter clocks on the island match those in Bermuda and Halifax in Canada.
