= Colombia national baseball team =

Information
- Country: Colombia
- Confederation: WBSC Americas
- Manager: José Mosquera
- Captain: José Quintana
- Team Colors: Blue, Yellow

WBSC ranking
- Current: 14 ▼1 (26 October 2026)
- Highest: 11 (first in December 2021)
- Lowest: 19 (first in December 2012)

Uniforms
Home	Away

World Baseball Classic
- Appearances: 3 (first in 2017)
- Best result: 11th (2017)

World Cup
- Appearances: 18 (first in 1944)
- Best result: 1st (2: 1947, 1965)

Pan American Games
- Appearances: 7 (first in 1951)
- Best result: 1st (2023)

The Colombia national baseball team (Spanish: Selección de béisbol de Colombia) is the national baseball team of Colombia. The team represents Colombia in international competitions.

Colombia has won two international baseball championships, both during the Amateur World Series era (1938-86); the first in 1947, and the second in 1965. In the modern era, it has qualified for the World Baseball Classic three times; in 2017, 2023, and 2026 it did not make it out of the pool stage.

The team competed in the 2026 World Baseball Classic at March 2026.

== History ==
The Colombian national team first participated in the Amateur World Series — which would become the Baseball World Cup — in 1944, finishing sixth. It would go on to win the 1947 edition, which it hosted in Barranquilla. Colombia again hosted, and won, in 1965, though the Colombian government notably denied the defending-champion Cuban team entry into the country, due to tensions with Fidel Castro's government.

In 2017, Colombia defeated Spain and Panama to secure their first ever appearance in the World Baseball Classic. The 2017 team was managed by Luis Urueta. Its pitching staff was anchored by Major Leaguers José Quintana and Julio Teheran, and included then-prospects Jorge Alfaro and Gio Urshela. However, the group was placed in the Pool C — meaning its "very tough" competitors would be the United States, the Dominican Republic, and Canada. Colombia ultimately finished third in the division and did not move on to the second round, though it did manage to defeat Canada 4–1 at Marlins Park in Miami.

The team tried but failed to qualify for the 2020 Olympics at the eight-team Americas Qualifying Event on May 31 through June 5, 2021.

As a participant in the 2017 WBC, Colombia automatically qualified for the expanded 2023 World Baseball Classic. It was placed in a group with the United States, Canada, Mexico, and a fifth team to be determined by qualification. On July 29, 2022, the team announced that Urueta would return to coach the national team for the WBC.

== Results and fixtures ==
The following is a list of professional baseball match results currently active in the latest version of the WBSC World Rankings, as well as any future matches that have been scheduled.

Legend

Win Lose Void or postponed Fixture

=== 2019 ===
Pan American Games Q	January 30	Panama	4–10	Colombia	Academia CBBS, Brazil
Pan American Games Q	15:00 BRT		Boxscore

Pan American Games Q	February 1	Colombia	8–6	Canada	Academia CBBS, Brazil
Pan American Games Q	11:00 BRT		Boxscore

Pan American Games Q	February 2	Colombia	5–4	Nicaragua	Academia CBBS, Brazil
Pan American Games Q	15:00 BRT		Boxscore

Pan American Games Q	February 3	Dominican Republic	17–4	Colombia	Academia CBBS, Brazil
Pan American Games Q	15:00 BRT		Boxscore

Pan American Games GS	July 29	Cuba	1–6	Colombia	Campo de Béisbol, Peru
Pan American Games GS	10:00 PET		Boxscore		Attendance: 2,456

Pan American Games GS	July 30	Colombia	4–2	Argentina	Campo de Béisbol, Peru
Pan American Games GS	15:00 PET		Boxscore		Attendance: 1,560

Pan American Games GS	August 1	Colombia	3–10	Canada	Campo de Béisbol, Peru
Pan American Games GS	10:00 PET		Boxscore		Attendance: 0

Pan American Games SR	August 2	Nicaragua	1–11 (F/7)	Colombia	Campo de Béisbol, Peru
Pan American Games SR	19:00 PET		Boxscore		Attendance: 1,513

Pan American Games SR	August 3	Puerto Rico	2–1	Colombia	Campo de Béisbol, Peru
Pan American Games SR	19:00 PET		Boxscore		Attendance: 2,313

Pan American Games 3rd	August 4	Colombia	0–6	Nicaragua	Campo de Béisbol, Peru
Pan American Games 3rd	11:00 PET		Boxscore		Attendance: 0

=== 2022 ===
Bolivarian Games RR	June 30	Peru	0–8	Colombia	Estadio Calamar, Colombia
Bolivarian Games RR	17:00 COT		Boxscore

Bolivarian Games RR	July 1	Dominican Republic	11–4	Colombia	Estadio Calamar, Colombia
Bolivarian Games RR	17:00 COT		Boxscore

Bolivarian Games RR	July 2	Colombia	10–0 (F/6)	Venezuela	Estadio Calamar, Colombia
Bolivarian Games RR	17:00 COT		Boxscore

Bolivarian Games RR	July 3	Colombia	8–0	Peru	Estadio Calamar, Colombia
Bolivarian Games RR	17:00 COT		Boxscore

Bolivarian Games RR	July 4	Colombia	2–6	Dominican Republic	Estadio Calamar, Colombia
Bolivarian Games RR	17:00 COT		Boxscore

Bolivarian Games RR	July 5	Venezuela	7–1	Colombia	Estadio Calamar, Colombia
Bolivarian Games RR	12:00 COT		Boxscore

=== 2023 ===
World Baseball Classic GS	March 11	Colombia	5–4 (F/10)	Mexico	Chase Field, United States
World Baseball Classic GS	12:00 MT	WP: Guillermo Zuñiga (1–0); HR: Reynaldo Rodríguez (1)	Boxscore	LP: Jesús Cruz (0–1); HR: Randy Arozarena (1)	Attendance: 28,497; Umpires: HP: Cory Blaser. 1B: Edwin Louisa. 2B: Doug Eddings. 3B: Jairo Mendoza

World Baseball Classic GS	March 13	Colombia	5–7	Great Britain	Chase Field, United States
World Baseball Classic GS	12:00 MT	LP: Yapson Gomez (0–1); HR: Dilson Herrera (1)	Boxscore	WP: Graham Spraker (1–0); Sv: Ian Gibaut (1); HR: Harry Ford (2)	Attendance: 10,416; Umpires: HP – Jhonatan Biarreta, 1B – Cory Blaser, 2B – Felix Tejada, 3B – Doug Eddings

World Baseball Classic GS	March 14	Canada	5–0	Colombia	Chase Field, United States
World Baseball Classic GS	12:00 MT	WP: Noah Skirrow (1–0); HR: Otto Lopez (1)	Boxscore	LP: Adrian Almeida (0–1)	Attendance: 10,571; Umpires: HP: Doug Eddings. 1B: Alan Porter. 2B: Jairo Mendoza. 3B: Edwin Louisa

World Baseball Classic GS	March 15	United States	3–2	Colombia	Chase Field, United States
World Baseball Classic GS	19:00 MT	WP: Kendall Graveman (1–0); Sv: Ryan Pressly (1)	Boxscore	LP: Ruben Galindo (0–1)	Attendance: 29,856; Umpires: HP – Alan Porter, 1B – Bill Miller, 2B – Jairo Mendoza, 3B – Roberto Peralta

=== 2026 ===
World Baseball Classic GS	March 6	Puerto Rico	5-0	Colombia	Hiram Bithorn Stadium, Puerto Rico
World Baseball Classic GS	19:00 AST	WP: Seth Lugo (1–0)	Boxscore	LP: Adrián Almeida (0–1)	Attendance: 18793; Umpires: HP – Alex MacKay, 1B – Mario Villavicencio, 2B – Junior Valentine, 3B – Domingo Paulino

World Baseball Classic GS	March 7	Colombia	2-8	Canada	Hiram Bithorn Stadium, Puerto Rico
World Baseball Classic GS	12:00 AST	LP: Austin Bergner (0–1)	Boxscore	WP: Michael Soroka (1–0); HR: Owen Caissie (1)	Attendance: 10,293; Umpires: HP – Junior Valentine, 1B – Tomoya Ishiyama, 2B – Vic Carapazza, 3B – Mario Villavicencio

World Baseball Classic GS	March 8	Colombia	4-7	Cuba	Hiram Bithorn Stadium in San Juan, Puerto Rico
World Baseball Classic GS	12:00 AST	LP: Luis Patiño (0–1)	Boxscore	WP: Denny Larrondo (1–0); HR: Ariel Martínez (1), Erisbel Arruebarrena (1)	Attendance: 10,957; Umpires: HP – Tripp Gibson, 1B – Laz Diaz, 2B – Chang Chan-jung, 3B – Mario Villavicencio

World Baseball Classic GS	March 9	Colombia	4-3	Panama	Hiram Bithorn Stadium in San Juan, Puerto Rico
World Baseball Classic GS	12:00 AST	WP: Austin Bergner (1–1); Sv: Pedro García (1); HR: José Caballero (1)	Boxscore	LP: Jorge García (0–1)	Attendance: 9,790; Umpires: HP – Chang Chan-jung, 1B – Nestor Ceja, 2B – Alex MacKay, 3B – Mario Villavicencio

WBSC Premier12 Q	October 9	Colombia	v	Italy	Anella Olímpica, Spain
WBSC Premier12 Q	12:00 CEST

WBSC Premier12 Q	October 10	Germany	v	Colombia	Anella Olímpica, Spain
WBSC Premier12 Q	12:00 CEST

WBSC Premier12 Q	October 11	Spain	v	Colombia	Anella Olímpica, Spain
WBSC Premier12 Q	19:00 CEST

== Current roster ==
Colombia roster – 2026 World Baseball Classic
Players		Coaches
Pitchers: 19 Adrian Almeida; 41 Danis Correa; 72 Pedro Garcia; 92 Rio Gomez; 30 Yapson Gomez; 39 David Lorduy; 62 Jose Quintana; 73 Jhon Romero; 22 Reiver Sanmartín; 49 Julio Teherán; 10 Ezequiel Zabaleta; 66 Guillo Zuniga; 77 Luis Patino; 26 Elkin Alcala; 45 Austin Bergner; 96 Emerson Martinez	Catchers: 51 Daniel Vellojin; 27 Carlos Martínez; 38 Jorge Alfaro; Infielders: 8 Michael Arroyo; 17 Reynaldo Rodríguez; 29 Gio Urshela; 40 Carlos Arroyo; 13 Jordan Diaz; 71 Dayan Frias; 7 Donovan Solano; Outfielders: 12 Brayan Buelvas; 16 Jesús Marriaga; 57 Gustavo Campero; 43 Harold Ramírez	Manager: 15 José Mosquera; Coaches: 19 Jhonatan Solano (bench); 18 Jair Fernández (hitting); 14 Dayan Díaz (pitching); 5 Jaime Del Valle (first base); 10 Ronald Ramírez (third base)

== International tournaments ==
=== World Baseball Classic ===
World Baseball Classic record							Qualification record			
Year	Round	Position	W	L	RS	RA	W	L	RS	RA
2006	Did not enter						No qualifiers held			
2009	Did not enter						No qualifiers held			
2013	Did not qualify						1	2	16	17
(United States) 2017	Group stage	11th	1	2	9	14	3	0	17	6
(United States) 2023	Group stage	18th	1	3	12	19	Automatically qualified			
(Puerto Rico) 2026	Group stage	14th	1	3	10	23	3	0	23	1
Total	Pool Stage	3/6	3	8	31	56	7	2	56	24

Colombia World Baseball Classic Record by opponent
Opponent	Tournaments met	W-L record	Largest victory		Largest defeat		Current streak
Opponent	Tournaments met	W-L record	Score	Tournament	Score	Tournament	Current streak
Canada	3	1-2	4–1	United States 2017	8–2	Puerto Rico 2026	L2
Cuba	1	0-1	–		7–4	Puerto Rico 2026	L1
Dominican Republic	1	0-1	–		10–3 (F/11)	United States 2017	L1
Great Britain	1	0-1	–		7–5	United States 2023	L1
Mexico	1	1-0	5–4 (F/10)	United States 2023	–		W1
Panama	1	1-0	4–3	Puerto Rico 2026	–		W1
Puerto Rico	1	0-1	–		5–0	Puerto Rico 2026	L1
United States	2	0-2	–		3–2 (F/10)	United States 2017	L2
Overall	3	3–8	Against CAN		Against DR		W1
Overall	3	3–8	4–1	United States 2017	10–3 (F/11)	United States 2017	W1

=== Baseball World Cup ===
- 1945 : 2nd
- 1947 : 1st
- 1948 : (bronze) 3rd
- 1965 : 1st
- 1970 : 4th
- 1971 : 2nd
- 1973 : 4th
- 1974 : (bronze) 3rd

=== Pan American Games ===
- 1971 : (bronze) 3rd
- 2015 : 7th
- 2019 : 4th
- 2023 : (gold) 1st

=== Intercontinental Cup ===
- 1975 : 8th
- 1977 : 5th

=== U-23 Baseball World Cup ===
- Bronze: 2021
