= 2026 Baseball5 World Cup =

Baseball5 tournament

Tournament details
- Country: Puerto Rico
- City: (Puerto Rico) San Juan
- Venue(s): Balneario de Isla Verde, Carolina
- Dates: 9–13 December 2026
- Teams: 16 (from 4 confederations)
- Defending champions: Cuba (2 titles)

Final positions
- Champions: To be determined
- Runners-up: To be determined
- Third place: To be determined
- Fourth place: To be determined

The 2026 Baseball5 World Cup will be the third edition of the Baseball5 World Cup, the mixed-gender world championship of baseball5 (B5) organized by the World Baseball Softball Confederation (WBSC). It will be held in Puerto Rico from 9 to 13 December 2026. It will be the first edition of the tournament to feature 16 teams, following the first two editions which had 12 participants.

Cuba enters as the two-time defending champion, having won the 2022 and 2024 editions. If they win the title in San Juan, they will become the first team to win three consecutive Baseball5 World Cups.

== Qualification and participating teams ==
The 2026 Baseball5 World Cup will be the first to feature 16 teams, after the WBSC Executive Board approved in 2024 the expansion of the tournament from 12 to 16 teams. The decision responded to the sustained growth of the discipline globally and the need to accommodate more national federations in the main event.

Unlike previous editions, no specific qualifier was held for the Americas region. The WBSC assigned the four American berths by combining the Baseball5 world ranking, the competitive activity of each federation, and the development potential of the discipline in each country. Thus, Cuba (No. 1), Mexico (No. 5), Argentina (No. 34), and the United States (No. 49) earned their spots. For Argentina and the United States, it will be their first participation in a Baseball5 World Cup.

The two WBSC invitations went to Kenya (No. 10) and South Korea (No. 11). Kenya finished third at the African Championship and South Korea placed fourth at the Asian qualifier, so both missed direct qualification. An additional invitation was assigned after no team from Oceania confirmed its participation, raising the number of wild cards to two.

Previously, Tunisia and South Africa qualified through the African Championship; Chinese Taipei, Japan, and Thailand secured their places via the Asian qualifier; and France, Spain, and Türkiye advanced from the European Championship. Puerto Rico earned its place automatically as the host country, while Hong Kong, China qualified as the previous World Cup host.

The most notable absence is Lithuania, fourth at the European Championship and a regular participant in world and continental events. Venezuela will also be absent, having finished fourth in two consecutive editions (2022 and 2024) but did not receive one of the American berths.

== Qualification ==
Event	Date	Location	Berths	Qualified
Host country	19 July 2026	WBSC	1	Puerto Rico
Previous edition host	—	—	1	Hong Kong
2025 European Championship	3–8 November 2025	(Lithuania) Panevėžys	3	France; Spain; Turkey
2025 African Championship	5–8 November 2025	(Zambia) Lusaka	2	Tunisia; South Africa
2026 Asia Cup	27–31 March 2026	Discovery Park, Hong Kong	3	Chinese Taipei; Japan; Thailand
WBSC Americas	—	—	4	Cuba; Mexico; Argentina; United States
WBSC (wild cards)	—	—	2	Kenya; South Korea
Total			16	

=== Summary of qualified teams ===
Team	Method of qualification	Date of qualification	Appearance(s)				Previous best performance (Note: Bold text indicates they hosted that edition.)	WR (Note: World rankings at the start of the tournament.)
Team	Method of qualification	Date of qualification	Total	First	Last	Streak	Previous best performance	WR
Puerto Rico	Hosts	19 July 2026	1st	Debut				22
France	2025 European Championship	8 November 2025	3rd	2022	2024	3	Third place (2024)	4
Spain	2025 European Championship	8 November 2025	1st	Debut				12
Turkey	2025 European Championship	8 November 2025	1st	Debut				9
Tunisia	2025 African Championship	8 November 2025	3rd	2022	2024	3	Sixth place (2022)	6
South Africa	2025 African Championship	8 November 2025	3rd	2022	2024	3	Seventh place (2022)	13
Chinese Taipei	2026 Asia Cup	31 March 2026	3rd	2022	2024	3	Third place (2022)	2
Japan	2026 Asia Cup	31 March 2026	3rd	2022	2024	3	Runners-up (2022, 2024)	3
Thailand	2026 Asia Cup	31 March 2026	1st	Debut				16
Hong Kong	Previous edition host	31 March 2026	3rd	2022	2024	3	Tenth place (**2024**)	15
Cuba	WBSC Americas	—	3rd	2022	2024	3	**Champions** (2022, 2024)	1
Mexico	WBSC Americas	—	3rd	2022	2024	3	Fifth place (**2022**)	5
Argentina	WBSC Americas	—	1st	Debut				34
United States	WBSC Americas	—	1st	Debut				49
Kenya	WBSC (wild cards)	—	2nd	2022		1	Eighth place (2022)	10
South Korea	WBSC (wild cards)	—	2nd	2022		1	Tenth place (2022)	11
