= 2023 Youth Baseball5 World Cup =

Tournament details
- Country: Turkey
- Venue: 1 (in 1 host city)
- Dates: 10–15 October 2023
- Teams: 12 (from 5 confederations)

Final positions
- Champions: Cuba (1st title)
- Runners-up: France
- Third place: Mexico
- Fourth place: Turkey

Tournament statistics
- Games played: 50

Awards
- MVP: (Cuba) Haila Gonzalez (Cuba) Jadier Ulloa

The 2023 Youth Baseball5 World Cup (2023 YB5WC) was the first edition of the Youth Baseball5 World Cup, a mixed-gender Baseball5 tournament held in 2023 from 10 to 15 October. 12 countries participated, with Cuba beating France in the final.

Cuba won the tournament, having gone unbeaten the entire time and only losing one game in a best-of-three against Mexico.

== Qualification ==
Event	Dates	Location(s)	Berth(s)	Qualified
Youth Baseball5 European Championship	16–19 November 2022	(Bulgaria) Sofia	2	France; Turkey
Youth Baseball5 Asia Cup	8–11 February 2023	(Malaysia) Kuala Lumpur	3	Chinese Taipei; China; South Korea
Youth Baseball5 African Championship	16–21 May 2023	(Ghana) Cape Coast	2	Ghana; Tunisia
WBSC Americas^{1}	—N/a	—N/a	2	Cuba; Mexico
WBSC Oceania^{1}	—N/a	—N/a	1	Australia
Wild card	—N/a	—N/a	2	Zambia; Malaysia
Total			12	

^{1}There was no qualification event for WBSC Americas and WBSC Oceania. Teams were selected by World Baseball Softball Confederation.

== Format ==
The 12 teams were divided into two groups. After the 30-game Opening Round concluded on 12 October, the top three finishers from each group advanced to the Super Round. The top two teams from the Super Round competed in the final on 15 October.

There was also a Placement Round to determine which of the teams that didn't advance to the Super Round finished in 7th to 12th place.

=== Teams ===
Group A: China, Cuba, Malaysia, Tunisia, Turkey and Zambia

Group B: Australia, France, Ghana, Korea, Mexico and Chinese Taipei

== Opening round ==
=== Group A ===
Pos	Team	Pld	W	L	RF	RA	RD	PCT	GB	Qualification
1	Cuba	5	5	0	93	12	+81	1.000	—	Advance to Super round
2	Turkey (H)	5	4	1	58	51	+7	.800	1	Advance to Super round
3	China	5	3	2	75	61	+14	.600	2	Advance to Super round
4	Tunisia	5	2	3	40	43	−3	.400	3	Advance to Placement round
5	Zambia	5	1	4	38	89	−51	.200	4	Advance to Placement round
6	Malaysia	5	0	5	21	69	−48	.000	5	Advance to Placement round

Source: WBSC
(H) Hosts

Date	Time		Score		Set 1	Set 2	Set 3	Total	Report
10 Oct	9:30	Cuba	2-0	China	10-0	11-1		21-1	Report
10 Oct	11:30	Malaysia	0-2	Tunisia	2-3	1-4		3-7	Report
10 Oct	13:00	Zambia	0-2	Cuba	1-16	0-3		1-19	Report
10 Oct	15:30	China	2-0	Malaysia	5-1	12-0		17-1	Report
10 Oct	20:30	Turkey	2-0	Zambia	9-7	9-6		18-13	Report
11 Oct	11:00	China	2-1	Zambia	9-0	6-8	13-0	28-8	Report
11 Oct	11:30	Turkey	2-0	Malaysia	6-4	5-2		11-6	Report
11 Oct	15:30	Zambia	0-2	Tunisia	0-10	2-3		2-13	Report
11 Oct	16:00	Cuba	2-0	Turkey	6-4	10-0		16-4	Report
11 Oct	19:00	Tunisia	0-2	Cuba	0-8	6-9		6-17	Report
12 Oct	10:00	China	0-2	Turkey	9-10	6-8		15-18	Report
12 Oct	12:30	Zambia	2-1	Malaysia	2-3	3-1	9-7	14-11	Report
12 Oct	15:30	Tunisia	1-2	China	5-2	1-4	7-8	13-14	Report
12 Oct	17:30	Malaysia	0-2	Cuba	0-8	0-12		0-20	Report
12 Oct	19:00	Turkey	2-0	Tunisia	5-1	2-0		7-1	Report

=== Group B ===
Pos	Team	Pld	W	L	RF	RA	RD	PCT	GB	Qualification
1	France	5	5	0	53	16	+37	1.000	—	Advance to Super round
2	Mexico	5	4	1	45	22	+23	.800	1	Advance to Super round
3	Chinese Taipei	5	3	2	49	47	+2	.600	2	Advance to Super round
4	Ghana	5	2	3	42	48	−6	.400	3	Advance to Placement round
5	South Korea	5	1	4	42	60	−18	.200	4	Advance to Placement round
6	Australia	5	0	5	13	51	−38	.000	5	Advance to Placement round

Source: WBSC

Date	Time		Score		Set 1	Set 2	Set 3	Total	Report
10 Oct	10:00	France	2-0	Mexico	4-1	5-1		9-2	Report
10 Oct	11:00	South Korea	2-0	Australia	11-6	7-0		18-6	Report
10 Oct	12:30	Ghana	0-2	France	1-3	0-5		1-8	Report
10 Oct	16:00	Mexico	2-0	South Korea	4-3	11-1		15-4	Report
10 Oct	17:00	Australia	0-2	Chinese Taipei	1-2	4-5		5-7	Report
11 Oct	10:00	Ghana	2-0	Australia	4-0	8-0		12-0	Report
11 Oct	13:00	France	2-0	Chinese Taipei	10-4	2-0		12-4	Report
11 Oct	17:00	Chinese Taipei	2-1	Ghana	12-3	5-7	4-2	21-12	Report
11 Oct	17:30	South Korea	1-2	France	2-4	5-4	0-6	7-14	Report
11 Oct	18:30	Australia	0-2	Mexico	0-2	0-2		0-4	Report
12 Oct	11:00	South Korea	1-2	Chinese Taipei	2-1	0-7	3-4	5-12	Report
12 Oct	11:30	Mexico	2-0	Ghana	4-3	7-1		11-4	Report
12 Oct	13:00	Australia	0-2	France	2-7	0-3		2-10	Report
12 Oct	16:00	Chinese Taipei	0-2	Mexico	4-6	1-7		5-13	Report
12 Oct	17:30	Ghana	2-0	South Korea	5-2	8-6		13-8	Report

== Second round ==
=== Super round ===
Pos	Team	Pld	W	L	RF	RA	RD	PCT	GB	Qualification
1	Cuba	5	5	0	78	19	+59	1.000	—	Advance to Final
2	France	5	4	1	44	41	+3	.800	1	Advance to Final
3	Turkey (H)	5	2	3	44	58	−14	.400 (Note: Head-to-head result: Turkey 2-0 Mexico)	3	Advance to Bronze medal game
4	Mexico	5	2	3	38	47	−9	.400	3	Advance to Bronze medal game
5	China	5	1	4	47	64	−17	.200 (Note: Head-to-head result: China 2-0 Chinese Taipei)	4	
6	Chinese Taipei	5	1	4	29	51	−22	.200	4	

Source: WBSC
(H) Hosts
Notes:

Date	Time		Score		Set 1	Set 2	Set 3	Total	Report
13 Oct	10:00	China	2-0	Chinese Taipei	6-0	8-5		14-5	Report
13 Oct	11:30	Turkey	2-0	Mexico	6-3	4-0		10-3	Report
13 Oct	13:00	Cuba	2-0	France	11-1	7-4		18-5	Report
13 Oct	16:00	China	0-2	Mexico	3-6	4-5		7-11	Report
13 Oct	17:30	Turkey	1-2	France	4-2	1-3	2-4	7-9	Report
13 Oct	19:00	Chinese Taipei	0-2	Cuba	0-4	0-3		0-7	Report
14 Oct	10:00	China	1-2	France	4-1	3-4	3-4	10-9	Report
14 Oct	11:30	Chinese Taipei	2-0	Turkey	6-2	9-3		15-5	Report
14 Oct	13:00	Mexico	1-2	Cuba	1-7	7-6	1-3	9-16	Report

=== Placement round ===
Pos	Team	Pld	W	L	RF	RA	RD	PCT	GB
1	Ghana	5	5	0	73	23	+50	1.000	—
2	Tunisia	5	4	1	60	36	+24	.800	1
3	South Korea	5	3	2	74	53	+21	.600	2
4	Malaysia	5	1	4	38	56	−18	.200	4
5	Zambia	5	1	4	47	77	−30	.200	4
6	Australia	5	1	4	29	76	−47	.200	4

Source: WBSC

Date	Time		Score		Set 1	Set 2	Set 3	Total	Report
13 Oct	9:30	Malaysia	2-0	Australia	7-1	6-4		13-5	Report
13 Oct	11:00	Zambia	1-2	South Korea	1-11	4-3	1-7	6-21	Report
13 Oct	12:30	Ghana	2-0	Tunisia	12-1	4-1		16-2	Report
13 Oct	15:30	Australia	2-1	Zambia	4-2	1-9	8-4	13-15	Report
13 Oct	17:00	Malaysia	0-2	Ghana	2-5	1-8		3-13	Report
13 Oct	18:30	South Korea	1-2	Tunisia	6-1	0-10	4-9	10-20	Report
14 Oct	16:00	Australia	1-2	Tunisia	1-11	3-1	1-6	5-18	Report
14 Oct	17:30	Zambia	1-2	Ghana	0-8	8-5	2-6	10-19	Report
14 Oct	19:00	Malaysia	1-2	South Korea	2-6	4-3	2-8	8-17	Report

== Finals round ==
=== Third place play-off ===
Team 1	Agg.	Team 2	1st leg	2nd leg	3rd leg
Mexico	2–1	Turkey	2–3 (F/6)	7–1	4–2

=== Final ===
15 October 2023 15:00 at Yenimahalle Spor Kompleksi Fair, 22 °C (72 °F), 57% humidity
Team	1	2	3	4	5	R	H	E
France	0	3	0	0	0	3	9	1
Cuba	5	0	1	0	X	6	12	0
Umpires: Alessia Cicconi (HP), Tony Jones (1F), Thalia Villavicencio (2F), Batuhan Akkaya (3F); Boxscore

15 October 2023 15:30 at Yenimahalle Spor Kompleksi Fair, 22 °C (72 °F), 57% humidity
Team	1	2	3	4	5	6	R	H	E
France	0	0	0	1	0	0	1	5	0
Cuba (6)	0	0	0	1	0	1	2	7	0
Umpires: Alessia Cicconi (HP), Tony Jones (1F), Thalia Villavicencio (2F), Batuhan Akkaya (3F); Boxscore
