= Philippines national Baseball5 team =

National Baseball5 team

Philippines

Information
- Country: Philippines
- Federation: Amateur Softball Association of the Philippines
- Confederation: WBSC Asia

WBSC ranking
- Current: NR (6 May 2026)

Baseball5 Asia Cup
- Appearances: 1 (first in 2022)

The Philippines national Baseball5 team represents the Philippines in international Baseball5 competitions. It is organized by the Amateur Softball Association of the Philippines.

== History ==
The Amateur Softball Association of the Philippines organized tryouts for a Baseball5 national team in 2020, which was intended to take part at the inaugural Baseball5 Asia Cup in Malaysia

The tournament in Malaysia was held two years later. The Philippines finished eight place.

== Tournament record ==
=== Baseball5 World Cup ===
Baseball5 World Cup record
Year	Round	Position	W	L	RS	RA
(Mexico) 2022	Did not qualify					
(Hong Kong) 2024	Did not enter					
Total	0/2	–	–	–	–	–

=== Baseball5 Asia Cup ===
Baseball5 Asia Cup record
Year	Round	Position	W	L	RS	RA
(Malaysia) 2022	Placement round	8th	2	4	18	23
(South Korea) 2024	Did not enter					
(Hong Kong) 2026	Did not enter					
Total	1/3	–	2	4	18	23

=== SEA Games ===
SEA Games record
Year	Round	Position	W	L	RS	RA
(Thailand) 2025	Did not enter					
Total	0/1	–	–	–	–	–
