= Australia national Baseball5 team =

Australia

Information
- Country: Australia
- Confederation: WBSC Oceania
- Manager: Adrián Medina

WBSC ranking
- Current: 39 ▼10 (6 May 2026)

Baseball5 World Cup
- Appearances: 1 (first in 2024)
- Best result: 12th (1 time, in 2024)

The Australia national Baseball5 team represents Australia in international Baseball5 competitions.

== History ==
Australia was scheduled to take part in the inaugural Baseball5 World Cup held in Mexico City in November 2022, but the team did not participate and was replaced by Hong Kong less than one month before the beginning of the tournament.

Australia made its Baseball5 World Cup debut in 2024 in Hong Kong. Trials were held in Victoria, New South Wales and Queensland to determine the squad that would play in the World Cup. Australia debuted with two defeats on the first day of the tournament against Mexico and Japan. The team finished last in Group B in the Opening Round, losing their remaining games against China, Tunisia and France.

== Current roster ==
As of 7 October 2024

No.	Pos.	Player	Gender
1	UTL	Jamie Bastian	F
15	UTL	Jonah Grey	M
14	UTL	Chase Karn	M
30	UTL	Jay Myers	M
6	UTL	José Rodríguez Naranjo	M
9	P	Allison Steane	F
5	UTL	Ebony Sutherland	F
54	UTL	Amelia Wright	F

=== Staff ===
No.	Pos.	Name
--	Manager	Adrián Medina

== Tournament record ==
=== Baseball5 World Cup ===
Baseball5 World Cup record
Year	Round	Position	W	L	RS	RA
(Mexico) 2022	Did not enter					
(Hong Kong) 2024	Placement round	12th	0	8	24	128
Total	1/2	–	0	8	24	128
