= 2026 Baseball5 Asia Cup =

Tournament details
- Country: Hong Kong
- Dates: 27–31 March
- Teams: 9

Final positions
- Champions: Chinese Taipei (2nd title)
- Runners-up: Japan
- Third place: Thailand
- Fourth place: South Korea

Tournament statistics
- Games played: 32

The 2026 Baseball5 Asia Cup was the 3rd edition of the Baseball5 Asia Cup, a Baseball5 tournament organized by WBSC Asia. The championship was held from 27 to 31 March 2026 in the Discovery Park in Hong Kong and was contested between nine national teams.

The top three teams from this tournament will qualify to participate in the 2026 baseball5 World Cup, which will be held in Puerto Rico in December.

== Venue ==
Hong Kong
Discovery Park
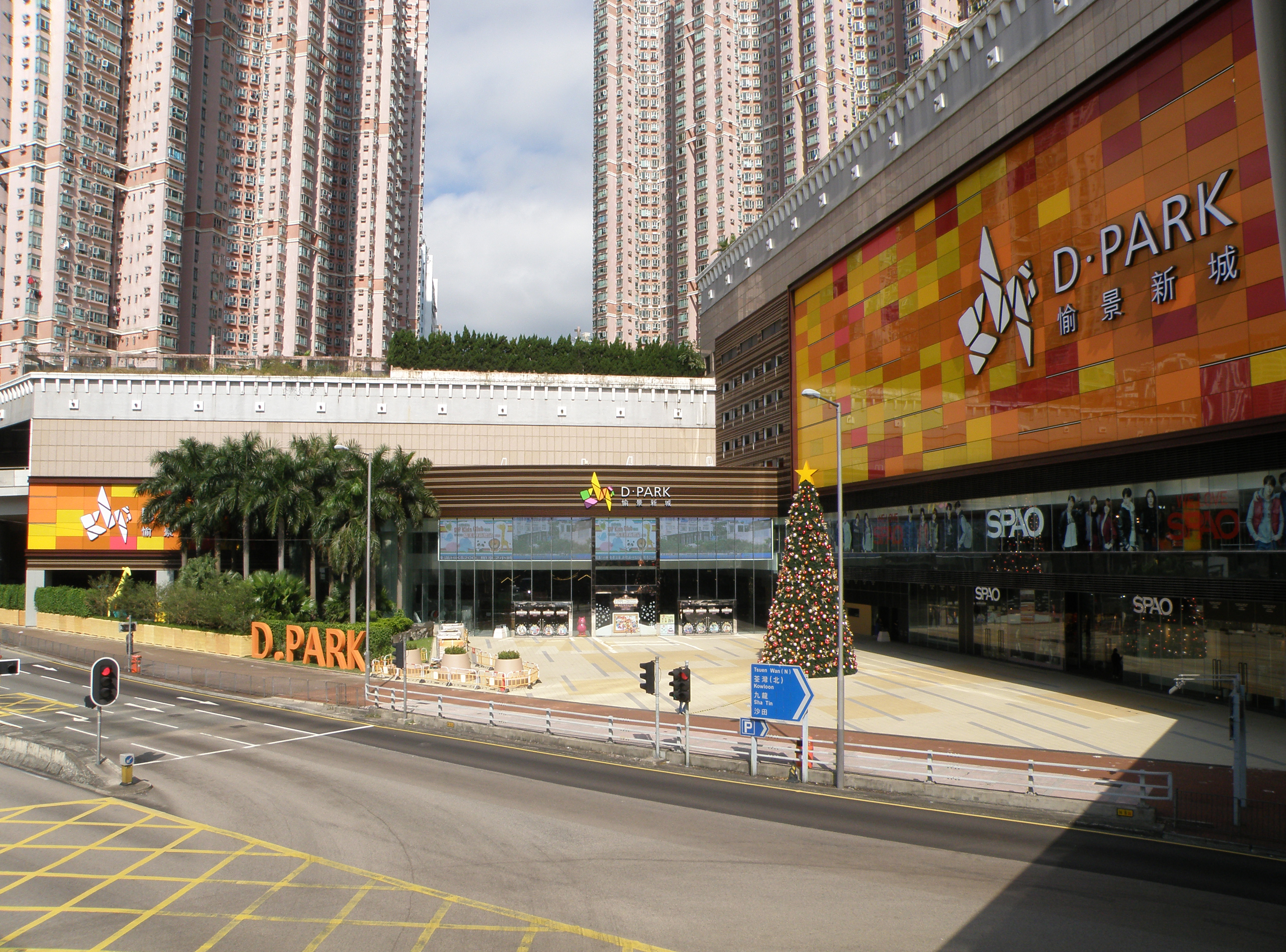

== Format ==
In the tournament, nine countries are divided into three groups of three teams each for the group stage. The top two teams from each group advance to the Super Round. The results from the group stage are carried over to the Super Round. The top four teams from the Super Round advance to the knockout stage, where they compete in the semi-finals and final.

== Opening round ==
=== Group A ===
Pos	Team	Pld	W	L	RF	RA	RD	PCT	GB	Qualification
1	South Korea	2	2	0	35	6	+29	1.000	—	Advance to Super round
2	Hong Kong (H)	2	1	1	22	19	+3	.500	1	Advance to Super round
3	Bangladesh	2	0	2	0	32	−32	.000	2	Advance to Placement round

Source: WBSC Asia
(H) Hosts

Date	Time		Score		Set 1	Set 2	Set 3	Total	Report
27 Mar	13:00	South Korea	2-0	Bangladesh	8-0	8-0		16-0	Forfeit
27 Mar	19:00	Bangladesh	0-2	Hong Kong	0-8	0-8		0-16	Forfeit
28 Mar	13:00	Hong Kong	0-2	South Korea	3-15	3-4		6-19	Report

=== Group B ===
Pos	Team	Pld	W	L	RF	RA	RD	PCT	GB	Qualification
1	Japan	2	2	0	66	11	+55	1.000	—	Advance to Super round
2	Thailand	2	1	1	54	21	+33	.500	1	Advance to Super round
3	Singapore	2	0	2	2	90	−88	.000	2	Advance to Placement round

Source: WBSC Asia

Date	Time		Score		Set 1	Set 2	Set 3	Total	Report
27 Mar	10:00	Singapore	0-2	Thailand	2-13	0-30		2-43	Report
27 Mar	14:30	Japan	2-0	Singapore	34-0	13-0		47-0	Report
28 Mar	10:00	Thailand	0-2	Japan	2-8	9-11		11-19	Report

=== Group C ===
Pos	Team	Pld	W	L	RF	RA	RD	PCT	GB	Qualification
1	Chinese Taipei	2	2	0	106	1	+105	1.000	—	Advance to Super round
2	Vietnam	2	1	1	33	63	−30	.500	1	Advance to Super round
3	Saudi Arabia	2	0	2	11	86	−75	.000	2	Advance to Placement round

Source: WBSC Asia

Date	Time		Score		Set 1	Set 2	Set 3	Total	Report
27 Mar	11:30	Vietnam	2-0	Saudi Arabia	18-9	15-1		33-10	Report
27 Mar	16:00	Chinese Taipei	2-0	Saudi Arabia	39-0	14-1		53-1	Report
28 Mar	11:30	Vietnam	0-2	Chinese Taipei	0-33	0-20		0-53	Report

== Super round ==
Pos	Team	Pld	W	L	RF	RA	RD	PCT	GB	Qualification
1	Chinese Taipei	5	5	0	140	29	+111	1.000	—	Advance to Semifinals
2	Japan	5	4	1	102	34	+68	.800	1	Advance to Semifinals
3	Thailand	5	3	2	125	77	+48	.600	2	Advance to Semifinals
4	South Korea	5	2	3	83	94	−11	.400	3	Advance to Semifinals
5	Hong Kong	5	1	4	47	85	−38	.200	4	
6	Vietnam	5	0	5	5	183	−178	.000	5	

Source: WBSC Asia

Date	Time		Score		Set 1	Set 2	Set 3	Total	Report
29 Mar	10:00	South Korea	1-2	Thailand	6-5	9-12	11-12	26-29	Report
29 Mar	11:30	Vietnam	0-2	Japan	0-15	0-15		0-30	Report
29 Mar	13:00	Hong Kong	0-2	Chinese Taipei	0-15	3-8		3-23	Report
29 Mar	14:30	Vietnam	0-2	Thailand	0-18	0-22		0-40	Report
29 Mar	16:00	Chinese Taipei	2-0	South Korea	11-1	13-0		24-1	Report
29 Mar	17:30	Japan	2-0	Hong Kong	4-0	6-4		10-4	Report
30 Mar	10:00	South Korea	2-0	Vietnam	20-3	15-2		35-5	Report
30 Mar	11:30	Chinese Taipei	2-0	Japan	7-5	10-8		17-13	Report
30 Mar	13:00	Thailand	2-0	Hong Kong	23-3	10-6		33-9	Report
30 Mar	14:30	Japan	2-0	South Korea	19-2	11-0		30-2	Report
30 Mar	16:00	Hong Kong	2-0	Vietnam	14-0	11-0		25-0	Report
30 Mar	17:30	Thailand	1-2	Chinese Taipei	0-8	9-2	3-13	12-23	Report

== Placement round ==
=== 7-9th place ===
Pos	Team	Pld	W	L	RF	RA	RD	PCT	GB
1	Singapore	4	4	0	100	45	+55	1.000	—
2	Saudi Arabia	4	2	2	79	47	+32	.500	2
3	Bangladesh	4	0	4	15	102	−87	.000	4

Source: WBSC Asia

Date	Time		Score		Set 1	Set 2	Set 3	Total	Report
28 Mar	14:30	Singapore	2-0	Bangladesh	25-2	19-1		44-3	Report
28 Mar	16:30	Saudi Arabia	1-2	Singapore	10-6	5-6	5-10	20-22	Report
28 Mar	18:30	Bangladesh	0-2	Saudi Arabia	0-15	4-14		4-29	Report
29 Mar	19:00	Singapore	2-1	Saudi Arabia	5-7	10-4	6-3	21-14	Report
30 Mar	19:00	Bangladesh	0-2	Singapore	4-7	4-6		8-13	Report
31 Mar	10:00	Saudi Arabia	2-0	Bangladesh	8-0	8-0		16-0	Forfeit

=== 5-6th place ===
Date	Time		Score		Set 1	Set 2	Set 3	Total	Report
31 Mar	14:30	Vietnam	0-2	Hong Kong	1-11	0-6		1-17	report

== Knockout stage ==
Semifinals
Thailand	0
Japan	2
South Korea	0
Chinese Taipei	2

Final
Japan	1
Chinese Taipei	2
3rd place
South Korea	0
Thailand	2

=== Semifinals ===
Date	Time		Score		Set 1	Set 2	Set 3	Total	Report
31 Mar	11:30	South Korea	0-2	Chinese Taipei	0-11	4-6		4-17	report
31 Mar	13:00	Thailand	0-2	Japan	5-10	3-8		8-18	report

=== 3rd place match ===
Date	Time		Score		Set 1	Set 2	Set 3	Total	Report
31 Mar	16:00	South Korea	0-2	Thailand	5-6	4-5		9-11	report

=== Final ===
Date	Time		Score		Set 1	Set 2	Set 3	Total	Report
31 Mar	17:30	Japan	1-2	Chinese Taipei	5-4	1-2	4-5	10-11	report

== Final standings ==
Pos	Team	W	L	Qualification
Gold medal	Chinese Taipei	8	0	Qualified for 2026 Baseball5 World Cup
Silver medal	Japan	6	2	Qualified for 2026 Baseball5 World Cup
Bronze medal	Thailand	5	3	Qualified for 2026 Baseball5 World Cup
4	South Korea	3	5	
5	Hong Kong	3	4	
6	Vietnam	1	6	
7	Singapore	4	2	
8	Saudi Arabia	2	4	
9	Bangladesh	0	6	
