= China national Baseball5 team =

China

Information
- Country: People's Republic of China
- Federation: Chinese Baseball Association
- Confederation: WBSC Asia
- Manager: Song Pingshan

WBSC ranking
- Current: 19 ▼5 (6 May 2026)

Baseball5 World Cup
- Appearances: 1 (first in 2024)
- Best result: 9th (1 time, in 2024)

Baseball5 Asia Cup
- Appearances: 1 (first in 2024)
- Best result: (bronze) 3rd (1 time, in 2024)

The China national Baseball5 team represents the People's Republic of China in international Baseball5 competitions.

== History ==
Baseball is not as popular in China as it is in other Asia-Pacific region countries. However, thanks to softball and Baseball5, the sport is becoming more popular, especially among the youth. China fielded its first youth Baseball5 team in the 2023 Youth Baseball5 World Cup played in Turkey.

China first participated in the 2024 Baseball5 Asia Cup held in Seoul, South Korea. The Chinese team finished the opening round second in its group with a 2–1 record, behind Japan. In the knockout stage, China defeated Malaysia in quarter-finals, but lost against Chinese Taipei in the semi-finals. China claimed the bronze medal after defeating hosts South Korea in the bronze medal game 2 sets to 0, qualifying to the 2024 Baseball5 World Cup.

== Current roster ==
As of 7 October 2024

No.	Pos.	Player	Gender
6	SS	Chen Jiayu	M
1	1B	Guo Chenyang	M
2	P	Huang Hantao	M
9	UTL	Liu Mengyao	F
12	2B	Wang Qin	F
22	UTL	Xu Shengfu	M
17	UTL	Yao Dingliu	F
23	UTL	Zhang Yi	F

=== Staff ===
No.	Pos.	Name
68	Manager	Song Pingshan

== Tournament record ==
=== Baseball5 World Cup ===
Baseball5 World Cup record
Year	Round	Position	W	L	RS	RA
(Mexico) 2022	Did not enter					
(Hong Kong) 2024	Placement round	9th	4	4	102	86
Total	1/2	–	4	4	102	86

=== Baseball5 Asia Cup ===
Baseball5 Asia Cup record
Year	Round	Position	W	L	RS	RA
(Malaysia) 2022	Did not enter					
(South Korea) 2024	Bronze medal game	3rd	4	2	63	39
Total	1/2	–	4	2	63	39
