= Thailand national Baseball5 team =

National Baseball5 team

Thailand

Information
- Country: Thailand
- Federation: Baseball Association of Thailand
- Confederation: WBSC Asia

WBSC ranking
- Current: 16 ▼1 (6 May 2026)

Baseball5 Asia Cup
- Appearances: 2 (first in 2022)

The Thailand national Baseball5 team represents Thailand in international Baseball5 competitions. It is organized by the Baseball Association of Thailand.

== History ==
Thailand took part at the 2022 Baseball5 Asia Cup in Malaysia. They finished seventh place in the inaugural continental tournament. In the 2024 edition, Thailand finished fifth.

When Thailand hosted the 2025 SEA Games, baseball5 was introduced for the very first time; the hosts won the inaugural baseball5 gold medal.

== Tournament record ==
=== Baseball5 World Cup ===
Baseball5 World Cup record
Year	Round	Position	W	L	RS	RA
(Mexico) 2022	Did not qualify					
(Hong Kong) 2024	Did not qualify					
(Puerto Rico) 2026	Qualified					
Total	1/3	–	–	–	–	–

=== Baseball5 Asia Cup ===
Baseball5 Asia Cup record
Year	Round	Position	W	L	RS	RA
(Malaysia) 2022	Placement round	8th	2	4	18	23
(South Korea) 2024	Placement round	5th	2	3	45	57
(Hong Kong) 2026	3rd place match	3rd	5	3	187	106
Total	3/3	–	9	10	250	186

=== SEA Games ===
SEA Games record
Year	Round	Position	W	L	RS	RA
(Thailand) 2025	Final	1st	4	0	97	36
Total	1/1	–	4	0	97	36
