= Harutomo Tsuji =

Japanese baseball player (born 1994)

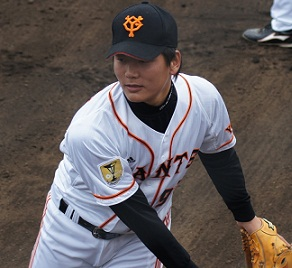
- Tsuji with the Yomiuri Giants
- Infielder
- Born: August 11, 1994 (age 31); Komono, Mie Prefecture, Japan
- Batted: Left Threw: Right

NPB debut
- June 12, 2015, for the Yomiuri Giants

Last NPB appearance
- October 1, 2018, for the Yomiuri Giants

NPB statistics
- Batting average: .190
- Home runs: 0
- Runs batted in: 1
- Stats at Baseball Reference

Teams
- Yomiuri Giants (2015–2018)
Medals
Baseball
Representing Japan
U-21 Baseball World Cup
Silver medal – second place	2014 Taichung	Team
Baseball5
Representing Japan
Baseball5 World Cup
Silver medal – second place	2024 Hong Kong	Team
Baseball5 Asia Cup
Gold medal – first place	2024 Seoul	Team

Harutomo Tsuji (辻東倫, Tsuji Harutomo; born August 11, 1994) is a Japanese former professional baseball infielder and current member of the Japan national Baseball5 team, where he plays as right-handed batter and pitcher. Tsuji spent five seasons playing for the Yomiuri Giants of Nippon Professional Baseball (NPB).

== Baseball career ==
Tsuji was born on August 11, 1994, in Komono, Mie Prefecture. He played baseball for the Komono High School. On October 25, 2012, he was selected by the Yomiuri Giants in the 2012 Nippon Professional Baseball draft.

In 2014 he was part of the Japanese team that won the silver medal at the 2014 U-21 Baseball World Cup.

Tsuji made his professional debut with the Giants on June 12, 2015, as a pinch runner. The next day, June 13, he played as a starter as third baseman and seven batter in the Giants lineup. In 2016 he played in 15 games, achieving his first professional hit on May 4 against the Hiroshima Toyo Carp. In 2017 he played 18 games.

In 2018, he suffered a right thigh strain. He played 66 game with the Giants minor league team and eight games with the major league team. On October 30, he was notified that he was no longer part of the team. He announced his retirement on December 8, citing his desire to remain with the Yomiuri Giants as a staff member.

After retiring, he became a coach in the Giants Academy.

== Baseball5 career ==
Tsuji transitioned from baseball to Baseball5, a simplified street version of baseball played with five players, using only a rubber ball and no bats or gloves. At first, he struggled with the difference in rules between baseball and Baseball 5. However, his teammate in the Japanese Baseball5 team Miu Tanaka stated: "As expected of a former professional, his defense is top-notch. He's extremely skilled at moving around."

Tsuji is a member of the Japan national Baseball5 team since March 2024, when he was selected as part of the Samurai Japan. He made his first appearance with the team at the 2024 Baseball5 Asia Cup held in Seoul, South Korea, where Japan won the gold medal. He was also part of the Japanese team that won the silver medal at the 2024 Baseball5 World Cup in Hong Kong. Tsuji was honored as part of the All Star Team of the tournament.
