= Youth Baseball5 World Cup =

Baseball5 world championship

- Most recent season or competition: 2025 Youth Baseball5 World Cup
- Sport: Baseball5
- First season: 2023
- No. of teams: 12
- Most recent champion: Cuba (2nd title) (2025)
- Most titles: Cuba (2 titles)
- Related competitions: Baseball5 World Cup
- Website: https://www.wbsc.org/en/organisation/wbsc-events/youth-baseball5-world-cup

The Youth Baseball5 World Cup (YBWSC) is a mixed-gender Baseball5 world championship consisting of 16 teams that occurs every two years, with the first edition in 2023. It is governed by the World Baseball Softball Confederation (WBSC). The 2025 edition will act as a qualifier for the mixed-gender Dakar 2026 Youth Olympics Baseball5 event, which will be Baseball5's first appearance at the Youth Olympics, as well as the first appearance of a mixed-gender team sport at an Olympic event.

== History ==
The YB5WC was initially scheduled to occur in 2021, but was postponed to 2023 due to the COVID-19 pandemic. France and Turkey qualified from the first-ever U-17 European Baseball5 Championship in 2022 to play in the 2023 YB5WC.

The 2025 edition will take place in Mexico.

== Format ==
The 16 countries participating in the Youth World Cup are geographically broken down as follows:

- The host nation automatically qualifies.
- The host nation of the previous edition automatically qualifies.
- 4 countries from the Americas
- 3 from Europe
- 2 from Africa
- 3 from Asia
- 1 from Oceania
- 1 Wild Card (selected by WBSC)

The 16 countries play a total of 56 games over four or five days.

== Results ==
Year	Host	Final			Third place game		
Year	Host	Champions	Score	Runners-up	Third place	Score	Fourth place
2023; Details	(Turkey); Ankara	Cuba	2–0	France	Mexico	2–1	Turkey
2025; Details	(Mexico); Tepic	Cuba	2–0	Chinese Taipei	Venezuela	2–0	Mexico

=== Medal table ===
Rank	Nation	Gold	Silver	Bronze	Total
1	Cuba	2	0	0	2
2	Chinese Taipei	0	1	0	1
2	France	0	1	0	1
4	Mexico	0	0	1	1
4	Venezuela	0	0	1	1
Totals (5 entries)		2	2	2	6

== Participating nations ==
- 1st — Champion
- 2nd — Runner-up
- 3rd — Third place
- 4th — Fourth place
- # — Position
- × — Withdrew
- — Hosts

Teams	(Turkey) 2023	(Mexico) 2025	Years
Australia	12th	—	1
China	5th	—	1
Chinese Taipei	6th	2nd	2
Cuba	1st	1st	2
Fiji	—	15th	1
France	2nd	9th	2
Ghana	7th	16th	2
Japan	—	7th	1
Kenya	—	5th	1
Lithuania	—	8th	1
Malaysia	10th	—	1
Mexico	3rd	4th	2
South Korea	9th	13th	2
Spain	—	10th	1
Syria	—	14th	1
Tunisia	8th	12th	2
Turkey	4th	6th	2
Venezuela	—	3rd	1
Zambia	11th	—	1
No. of Teams	12	16	

== See also ==
- Baseball5 World Cup
