= Venezuela national Baseball5 team =

Venezuela

Venezuela

Information
- Country: Venezuela
- Confederation: WBSC Americas
- Manager: (Venezuela) Niowaldo Zorrilla

WBSC ranking
- Current: 7 (31 December 2025)

Baseball5 World Cup
- Appearances: 2 (first in 2022)
- Best result: 4th (2 times, most recent in 2024)

Baseball5 Pan American Championship
- Appearances: 1 (first in 2024)
- Best result: (bronze) 3rd ( time, in 2024)

The Venezuela national Baseball5 team represents Venezuela in international Baseball5 competitions.

== History ==
Venezuela, alongside Cuba, were invited by the World Baseball Softball Confederation to represent WBSC Americas in the 2022 Baseball5 World Cup, held in Mexico City. The Venezuelan team finished fourth after losing to Chinese Taipei 0 matches to 2.

Venezuela hosted the 2024 Baseball5 Pan American Championship, held in Barquisimeto, where the team finished third, after losing in the semifinals against Mexico.

== Current roster ==
As of 7 October 2024

No.	Pos.	Player	Gender
10	UTL	José Alvarado	M
5	UTL	Yohelis Colina	F
21	UTL	Marbel Díaz	F
18	UTL	Génesis González	F
13	UTL	Luis Márques	M
14	UTL	Aleiber Martínez	M
22	UTL	Humberto Molina	M
9	UTL	Yoselin Sosa	F

=== Staff ===
No.	Pos.	Name
--	Manager	Niowaldo Zorrilla

== Tournament record ==
=== Baseball5 World Cup ===
Baseball5 World Cup record
Year	Round	Position	W	L	RS	RA
(Mexico) 2022	Semifinals	4th	6	3	68	71
(Hong Kong) 2024	Bronze medal game	4th	6	3	118	50
Total	2/2	–	12	6	186	121

=== Baseball5 Pan American Championship ===
Baseball5 Pan American Championship record
Year	Round	Position	W	L	RS	RA
(Venezuela) 2024	Semifinals	3rd	3	4	67	54
Total	1/1	–	3	4	67	54
