= Pakistan national Baseball5 team =

Pakistan

Information
- Country: Pakistan
- Federation: Pakistan Federation Baseball
- Confederation: WBSC Asia

WBSC ranking
- Current: 65 (6 May 2026)

The Pakistan national Baseball5 team represents Pakistan in international Baseball5 competitions.

== History ==
Baseball5 was first introduced in Pakistan in 2019. The Pakistan Cycling Federation has signed an agreement with the Baseball Federation to provide the national Baseball5 team a venue in central Lahore.

Pakistan participated in the 2022 Baseball5 Asia Cup and finished in last place.

== Roster ==
As of 2022

No.	Pos.	Player	Gender
0	OF	Muhammad Ali	M
0	IF	Gulnaz Intzar	F
0	IF	Aneela Kanwal	F
0	OF	Ahsan Ameer Kazmi	M
0	IF	Hafiz Ghulam Nabi	M
0	IF	Sidra Riasat	F
0	IF	Isma Riaz	F
0	OF	Syed Muhammad Shah	M

=== Staff ===
No.	Pos.	Name
-	Manager	Fakhar Shah
-	Coach	Fakhar Kazmi

== Tournament record ==
=== Baseball5 Asia Cup ===
Baseball5 Youth Asia Cup record
Year	Round	Position	W	L	RS	RA
(Malaysia) 2022	Group stage	9th	0	2	7	40
Total	-	9th	0	2	-	-
