= Baseball5 Asia Cup =

- Sport: Baseball5
- Founded: 2022
- No. of teams: 8
- Continent: Asia
- Most recent champion: Chinese Taipei (2nd title)
- Most titles: Chinese Taipei (2 title)
- 2026 Baseball5 Asia Cup

The Baseball5 Asia Cup is the main Baseball5 tournament in Asia, governed by WBSC Asia. The top three teams qualify to the Baseball5 World Cup.

== History ==
The inaugural edition of the Baseball5 Asia Cup was due to be held in 2020, but was postponed due to the COVID-19 pandemic. The first championship was held in August 2022 in Kuala Lumpur, Malaysia and was won by Chinese Taipei, after beating Japan in the final 2 matches to 1.

The second edition of the tournament was held in Seoul's Olympic Park, South Korea. In a replay of the 2022 final, Japan beat Chinese Taipei 2 sets to 0 to claim their first Asian championship.

== Results ==
Year	Host	Final			Third place game		
Year	Host	Champions	Score	Runners-up	Third place	Score	Fourth place
2022; Details	(Malaysia); Kuala Lumpur	Chinese Taipei	2–1	Japan	South Korea	2–0	Hong Kong
2024; Details	(South Korea); Seoul	Japan	2–1	Chinese Taipei	China	2–0	South Korea
2026; Details	Hong Kong	Chinese Taipei	2–1	Japan	Thailand	2–0	South Korea

=== Medal table ===
Rank	Nation	Gold	Silver	Bronze	Total
1	Chinese Taipei	2	1	0	3
2	Japan	1	2	0	3
3	China	0	0	1	1
3	South Korea	0	0	1	1
3	Thailand	0	0	1	1
Totals (5 entries)		3	3	3	9

=== Participating teams ===
Teams	(Malaysia) 2022	(South Korea) 2024	(Hong Kong) 2026	Years
Bangladesh			9th	1
China		3rd		1
Chinese Taipei	1st	2nd	1st	3
Hong Kong	4th	8th	5th	3
Japan	2nd	1st	2nd	3
Malaysia	5th	6th		2
Pakistan	9th			1
Philippines	8th			1
Saudi Arabia			8th	1
Singapore	6th	7th	7th	3
South Korea	3rd	4th	4th	3
Thailand	7th	5th	3rd	3
Vietnam			6th	1
Total	9	8	9	

== See also ==
- Baseball5 World Cup
- Youth Baseball5 World Cup
- Baseball5 Pan American Championship
- Baseball5 African Championship
- Baseball5 European Championship
