= Baseball Association of Thailand =

Sports governing body

- Abbreviation: BBAT
- Formation: 1992
- Type: Sport governing body
- Legal status: Active
- Purpose: Governing baseball in Thailand
- Headquarters: Bangkok, Thailand
- Region served: Domestic
- Members: Baseball Federation of Asia
- Official language: Thai
- President: Douangchote Suwanjalask

The Baseball Association of Thailand (BBAT), formerly known as the Amateur Baseball Association of Thailand (ABAT), is the national governing body for baseball in Thailand and the Thailand national baseball team. The BBAT was established on January 3, 1992. It was sanctioned by the National Culture Commission and the Sports Authority of Thailand, in addition to being recognized by the National Olympic Committee of Thailand. BBAT was able to develop baseball in Thailand with help from the Baseball Federation of Japan.

Thailand began competing in baseball internationally in the 1990s, debuting at the 1994 Asian Games. Thailand also reached the Southeast Asia qualifier final for the 1996 Summer Olympics. The Thailand national team saw more success on the regional level, winning a gold medal at the 2007 SEA Games and a bronze medal at the 2011 SEA Games.

== See also ==
- Baseball Federation of Asia
- Thailand national baseball team
- Thailand national under-18 baseball team
- Thailand women's national baseball team
- Sport in Thailand
