= 2024 Baseball5 World Cup =

Baseball5 tournament

Tournament details
- Country: Hong Kong
- Dates: 7–12 October
- Teams: 12

Final positions
- Champions: Cuba (2nd title)
- Runners-up: Japan
- Third place: France
- Fourth place: Venezuela

Tournament statistics
- Games played: 50

Awards
- MVP: (Cuba) Briandy Molina (Cuba) Haila González

The 2024 Baseball5 World Cup was the second edition of the Baseball5 World Cup, the mixed-gender Baseball5 (B5) world championship organized by the World Baseball Softball Confederation (WBSC). It was held in Hong Kong from 7 to 12 October 2024. Twelve teams took part.

The tournament was won by Cuba in their second straight Baseball5 World Cup title. The Cuban team defeated Japan in the championship game, a replay of the 2022 final, 2 sets to 0 to finish the tournament undefeated with a 9–0 record. Cuban players Briandy Molina and Haila González received the Male MVP and Female MPV of the World Cup.

France claimed the bronze after defeating Venezuela in the bronze medal game, 2 sets to 0.

The 2024 World Cup cost $12 million to host, with the Baseball Association of Hong Kong providing half of the funding. The event has been given "M" Mark status (major sport event) by the Hong Kong government.

== Qualification ==
Event	Dates	Location(s)	Berth(s)	Qualified
Host nation	—N/a	—N/a	1	Hong Kong
Baseball5 European Championship	7–11 November 2023	(Lithuania) Druskininkai	2	France; Lithuania
Baseball5 African Championship	5–8 February 2024	(Cape Verde) Praia	2	South Africa; Tunisia
Baseball5 Asia Cup	13–16 April 2024	(South Korea) Seoul	3	Chinese Taipei; Japan; China
Baseball5 Pan American Championship	26–30 June 2024	(Venezuela) Barquisimeto	3	Cuba; Mexico; Venezuela
WBSC Oceania	—N/a	—N/a	1	Australia
Total			12	

== Venues ==
Group A, Group B, Super Round & Placement Round
Hong Kong
Central Harbourfront
Capacity: 36,000 sq,m
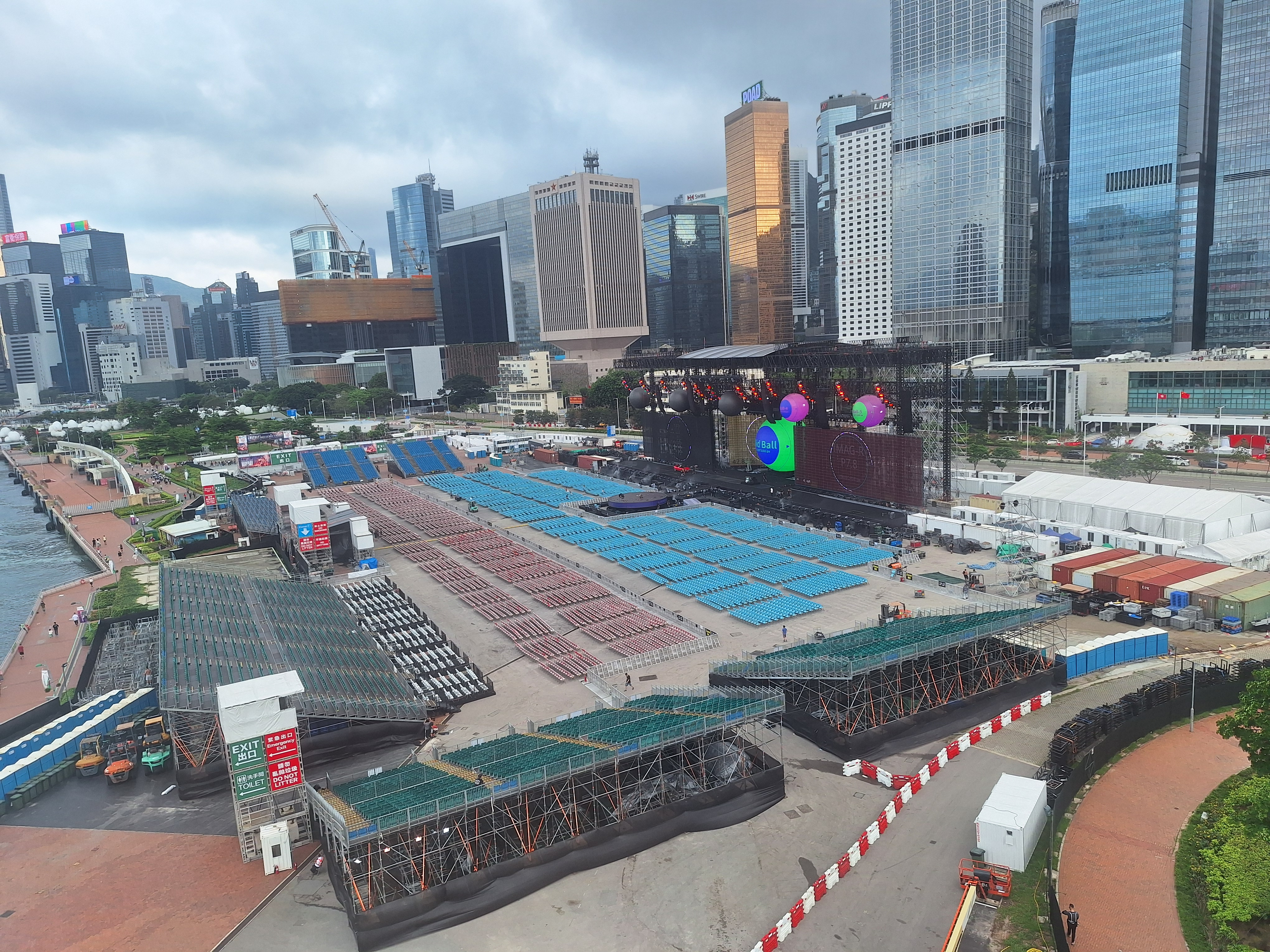

== Opening round ==
=== Group A ===
Pos	Team	Pld	W	L	RF	RA	RD	PCT	GB	Qualification
1	Cuba	5	5	0	92	13	+79	1.000	—	Advance to Super round
2	Venezuela	5	4	1	81	29	+52	.800	1	Advance to Super round
3	Chinese Taipei	5	3	2	56	40	+16	.600	2	Advance to Super round
4	Lithuania	5	2	3	60	74	−14	.400	3	Advance to Placement round
5	Hong Kong (H)	5	1	4	29	105	−76	.200	4	Advance to Placement round
6	South Africa	5	0	5	32	89	−57	.000	5	Advance to Placement round

Source: WBSC
(H) Hosts

7 October; 9:30 (UTC+8)	Cuba	2–0	Lithuania	Asia’s World City Court, Central Harbourfront, Hong Kong, China
7 October; 9:30 (UTC+8)		Boxscore		Asia’s World City Court, Central Harbourfront, Hong Kong, China

7 October; 11:30 (UTC+8)	Chinese Taipei	1–2	Venezuela	Bauhinia Court, Central Harbourfront, Hong Kong, China
7 October; 11:30 (UTC+8)		Boxscore		Bauhinia Court, Central Harbourfront, Hong Kong, China

7 October; 13:00 (UTC+8)	South Africa	0–2	Cuba	Bauhinia Court, Central Harbourfront, Hong Kong, China
7 October; 13:00 (UTC+8)		Boxscore		Bauhinia Court, Central Harbourfront, Hong Kong, China

7 October; 15:00 (UTC+8)	Lithuania	0–2	Chinese Taipei	Asia’s World City Court, Central Harbourfront, Hong Kong, China
7 October; 15:00 (UTC+8)		Boxscore		Asia’s World City Court, Central Harbourfront, Hong Kong, China

7 October; 19:30 (UTC+8)	Hong Kong	2–0	South Africa	Bauhinia Court, Central Harbourfront, Hong Kong, China
7 October; 19:30 (UTC+8)		Boxscore		Bauhinia Court, Central Harbourfront, Hong Kong, China

8 October; 11:00 (UTC+8)	Lithuania	2–0	South Africa	Asia’s World City Court, Central Harbourfront, Hong Kong, China
8 October; 11:00 (UTC+8)		Boxscore		Asia’s World City Court, Central Harbourfront, Hong Kong, China

8 October; 11:30 (UTC+8)	Hong Kong	0–2	Chinese Taipei	Bauhinia Court, Central Harbourfront, Hong Kong, China
8 October; 11:30 (UTC+8)		Boxscore		Bauhinia Court, Central Harbourfront, Hong Kong, China

8 October; 15:30 (UTC+8)	South Africa	0–2	Venezuela	Asia’s World City Court, Central Harbourfront, Hong Kong, China
8 October; 15:30 (UTC+8)		Boxscore		Asia’s World City Court, Central Harbourfront, Hong Kong, China

8 October; 16:30 (UTC+8)	Cuba	2–0	Hong Kong	Bauhinia Court, Central Harbourfront, Hong Kong, China
8 October; 16:30 (UTC+8)		Boxscore		Bauhinia Court, Central Harbourfront, Hong Kong, China

8 October; 19:00 (UTC+8)	Venezuela	0–2	Cuba	Bauhinia Court, Central Harbourfront, Hong Kong, China
8 October; 19:00 (UTC+8)		Boxscore		Bauhinia Court, Central Harbourfront, Hong Kong, China

9 October; 10:00 (UTC+8)	Lithuania	2–0	Hong Kong	Bauhinia Court, Central Harbourfront, Hong Kong, China
9 October; 10:00 (UTC+8)		Boxscore		Bauhinia Court, Central Harbourfront, Hong Kong, China

9 October; 12:30 (UTC+8)	South Africa	1–2	Chinese Taipei	Asia’s World City Court, Central Harbourfront, Hong Kong, China
9 October; 12:30 (UTC+8)		Boxscore		Asia’s World City Court, Central Harbourfront, Hong Kong, China

9 October; 15:30 (UTC+8)	Venezuela	2–0	Lithuania	Asia’s World City Court, Central Harbourfront, Hong Kong, China
9 October; 15:30 (UTC+8)		Boxscore		Asia’s World City Court, Central Harbourfront, Hong Kong, China

9 October; 17:30 (UTC+8)	Chinese Taipei	0–2	Cuba	Bauhinia Court, Central Harbourfront, Hong Kong, China
9 October; 17:30 (UTC+8)		Boxscore		Bauhinia Court, Central Harbourfront, Hong Kong, China

9 October; 19:00 (UTC+8)	Hong Kong	0–2	Venezuela	Bauhinia Court, Central Harbourfront, Hong Kong, China
9 October; 19:00 (UTC+8)		Boxscore		Bauhinia Court, Central Harbourfront, Hong Kong, China

=== Group B ===
Pos	Team	Pld	W	L	RF	RA	RD	PCT	GB	Qualification
1	Japan	5	5	0	85	25	+60	1.000	—	Advance to Super round
2	France	5	4	1	71	44	+27	.800	1	Advance to Super round
3	Mexico	5	3	2	51	40	+11	.600	2	Advance to Super round
4	Tunisia	5	2	3	64	78	−14	.400	3	Advance to Placement round
5	China	5	1	4	59	62	−3	.200	4	Advance to Placement round
6	Australia	5	0	5	10	91	−81	.000	5	Advance to Placement round

Source: WBSC

7 October; 10:00 (UTC+8)	France	2–0	Tunisia	Bauhinia Court, Central Harbourfront, Hong Kong, China
7 October; 10:00 (UTC+8)		Boxscore		Bauhinia Court, Central Harbourfront, Hong Kong, China

7 October; 11:00 (UTC+8)	Mexico	2–0	Australia	Asia’s World City Court, Central Harbourfront, Hong Kong, China
7 October; 11:00 (UTC+8)		Boxscore		Asia’s World City Court, Central Harbourfront, Hong Kong, China

7 October; 12:30 (UTC+8)	China	1–2	France	Asia’s World City Court, Central Harbourfront, Hong Kong, China
7 October; 12:30 (UTC+8)		Boxscore		Asia’s World City Court, Central Harbourfront, Hong Kong, China

7 October; 15:30 (UTC+8)	Tunisia	0–2	Mexico	Bauhinia Court, Central Harbourfront, Hong Kong, China
7 October; 15:30 (UTC+8)		Boxscore		Bauhinia Court, Central Harbourfront, Hong Kong, China

7 October; 16:30 (UTC+8)	Australia	0–2	Japan	Asia’s World City Court, Central Harbourfront, Hong Kong, China
7 October; 16:30 (UTC+8)		Boxscore		Asia’s World City Court, Central Harbourfront, Hong Kong, China

8 October; 10:00 (UTC+8)	China	2–0	Australia	Bauhinia Court, Central Harbourfront, Hong Kong, China
8 October; 10:00 (UTC+8)		Boxscore		Bauhinia Court, Central Harbourfront, Hong Kong, China

8 October; 13:00 (UTC+8)	France	1–2	Japan	Bauhinia Court, Central Harbourfront, Hong Kong, China
8 October; 13:00 (UTC+8)		Boxscore		Bauhinia Court, Central Harbourfront, Hong Kong, China

8 October; 17:00 (UTC+8)	Japan	2–0	China	Asia’s World City Court, Central Harbourfront, Hong Kong, China
8 October; 17:00 (UTC+8)		Boxscore		Asia’s World City Court, Central Harbourfront, Hong Kong, China

8 October; 17:30 (UTC+8)	Mexico	0–2	France	Bauhinia Court, Central Harbourfront, Hong Kong, China
8 October; 17:30 (UTC+8)		Boxscore		Bauhinia Court, Central Harbourfront, Hong Kong, China

8 October; 18:30 (UTC+8)	Australia	0–2	Tunisia	Asia’s World City Court, Central Harbourfront, Hong Kong, China
8 October; 18:30 (UTC+8)		Boxscore		Asia’s World City Court, Central Harbourfront, Hong Kong, China

9 October; 11:00 (UTC+8)	Mexico	0–2	Japan	Asia’s World City Court, Central Harbourfront, Hong Kong, China
9 October; 11:00 (UTC+8)		Boxscore		Asia’s World City Court, Central Harbourfront, Hong Kong, China

9 October; 11:30 (UTC+8)	Tunisia	2–1	China	Bauhinia Court, Central Harbourfront, Hong Kong, China
9 October; 11:30 (UTC+8)		Boxscore		Bauhinia Court, Central Harbourfront, Hong Kong, China

9 October; 13:00 (UTC+8)	Australia	0–2	France	Bauhinia Court, Central Harbourfront, Hong Kong, China
9 October; 13:00 (UTC+8)		Boxscore		Bauhinia Court, Central Harbourfront, Hong Kong, China

9 October; 16:00 (UTC+8)	Japan	2–1	Tunisia	Bauhinia Court, Central Harbourfront, Hong Kong, China
9 October; 16:00 (UTC+8)		Boxscore		Bauhinia Court, Central Harbourfront, Hong Kong, China

9 October; 17:00 (UTC+8)	China	1–2	Mexico	Asia’s World City Court, Central Harbourfront, Hong Kong, China
9 October; 17:00 (UTC+8)		Boxscore		Asia’s World City Court, Central Harbourfront, Hong Kong, China

== Second round ==
=== Super round ===
Pos	Team	Pld	W	L	RF	RA	RD	PCT	GB	Qualification
1	Cuba	5	5	0	66	19	+47	1.000	—	Advance to Final
2	Japan	5	4	1	47	34	+13	.800	1	Advance to Final
3	Venezuela	5	3	2	62	38	+24	.600	2	Advance to Bronze medal game
4	France	5	2	3	43	68	−25	.400	3	Advance to Bronze medal game
5	Chinese Taipei	5	1	4	30	50	−20	.200	4	
6	Mexico	5	0	5	13	52	−39	.000	5	

Source: WBSC

10 October; 10:00 (UTC+8)	Mexico	0–2	Chinese Taipei	Bauhinia Court, Central Harbourfront, Hong Kong, China
10 October; 10:00 (UTC+8)		Boxscore		Bauhinia Court, Central Harbourfront, Hong Kong, China

10 October; 11:30 (UTC+8)	Venezuela	2–1	France	Bauhinia Court, Central Harbourfront, Hong Kong, China
10 October; 11:30 (UTC+8)		Boxscore		Bauhinia Court, Central Harbourfront, Hong Kong, China

10 October; 13:00 (UTC+8)	Japan	1–2	Cuba	Bauhinia Court, Central Harbourfront, Hong Kong, China
10 October; 13:00 (UTC+8)		Boxscore		Bauhinia Court, Central Harbourfront, Hong Kong, China

10 October; 16:00 (UTC+8)	Chinese Taipei	0–2	France	Bauhinia Court, Central Harbourfront, Hong Kong, China
10 October; 16:00 (UTC+8)		Boxscore		Bauhinia Court, Central Harbourfront, Hong Kong, China

10 October; 17:30 (UTC+8)	Mexico	0–2	Cuba	Bauhinia Court, Central Harbourfront, Hong Kong, China
10 October; 17:30 (UTC+8)		Boxscore		Bauhinia Court, Central Harbourfront, Hong Kong, China

10 October; 19:00 (UTC+8)	Venezuela	1–2	Cuba	Bauhinia Court, Central Harbourfront, Hong Kong, China
10 October; 19:00 (UTC+8)		Boxscore		Bauhinia Court, Central Harbourfront, Hong Kong, China

11 October; 16:00 (UTC+8)	Mexico	0–2	Venezuela	Bauhinia Court, Central Harbourfront, Hong Kong, China
11 October; 16:00 (UTC+8)		Boxscore		Bauhinia Court, Central Harbourfront, Hong Kong, China

11 October; 17:30 (UTC+8)	Chinese Taipei	0–2	Japan	Bauhinia Court, Central Harbourfront, Hong Kong, China
11 October; 17:30 (UTC+8)		Boxscore		Bauhinia Court, Central Harbourfront, Hong Kong, China

11 October; 19:00 (UTC+8)	France	0–2	Cuba	Bauhinia Court, Central Harbourfront, Hong Kong, China
11 October; 19:00 (UTC+8)		Boxscore		Bauhinia Court, Central Harbourfront, Hong Kong, China

=== Placement round ===
Pos	Team	Pld	W	L	RF	RA	RD	PCT	GB
1	Tunisia	5	4	1	74	45	+29	.800	—
2	Lithuania	5	4	1	83	43	+40	.800	—
3	China	5	4	1	78	39	+39	.800	—
4	Hong Kong (H)	5	2	3	51	79	−28	.400	2
5	South Africa	5	1	4	50	68	−18	.200	3
6	Australia	5	0	5	19	81	−62	.000	4

Source: WBSC
(H) Hosts

10 October; 9:30 (UTC+8)	Australia	0–2	South Africa	Asia’s World City Court, Central Harbourfront, Hong Kong, China
10 October; 9:30 (UTC+8)		Boxscore		Asia’s World City Court, Central Harbourfront, Hong Kong, China

10 October; 11:00 (UTC+8)	China	2–1	Hong Kong	Asia’s World City Court, Central Harbourfront, Hong Kong, China
10 October; 11:00 (UTC+8)		Boxscore		Asia’s World City Court, Central Harbourfront, Hong Kong, China

10 October; 12:30 (UTC+8)	Tunisia	1–2	Lithuania	Asia’s World City Court, Central Harbourfront, Hong Kong, China
10 October; 12:30 (UTC+8)		Boxscore		Asia’s World City Court, Central Harbourfront, Hong Kong, China

10 October; 15:30 (UTC+8)	Australia	0–2	Hong Kong	Asia’s World City Court, Central Harbourfront, Hong Kong, China
10 October; 15:30 (UTC+8)		Boxscore		Asia’s World City Court, Central Harbourfront, Hong Kong, China

10 October; 17:00 (UTC+8)	South Africa	1–2	Tunisia	Asia’s World City Court, Central Harbourfront, Hong Kong, China
10 October; 17:00 (UTC+8)		Boxscore		Asia’s World City Court, Central Harbourfront, Hong Kong, China

10 October; 18:30 (UTC+8)	China	2–0	Lithuania	Asia’s World City Court, Central Harbourfront, Hong Kong, China
10 October; 18:30 (UTC+8)		Boxscore		Asia’s World City Court, Central Harbourfront, Hong Kong, China

11 October; 10:00 (UTC+8)	Australia	0–2	Lithuania	Bauhinia Court, Central Harbourfront, Hong Kong, China
11 October; 10:00 (UTC+8)		Boxscore		Bauhinia Court, Central Harbourfront, Hong Kong, China

11 October; 11:30 (UTC+8)	Hong Kong	0–2	Tunisia	Bauhinia Court, Central Harbourfront, Hong Kong, China
11 October; 11:30 (UTC+8)		Boxscore		Bauhinia Court, Central Harbourfront, Hong Kong, China

11 October; 13:00 (UTC+8)	South Africa	0–2	China	Bauhinia Court, Central Harbourfront, Hong Kong, China
11 October; 13:00 (UTC+8)		Boxscore		Bauhinia Court, Central Harbourfront, Hong Kong, China

== Medal games ==
=== Bronze medal game ===
12 October; 15:00 (UTC+8)	France	2–0	Venezuela	Bauhinia Court, Central Harbourfront, Hong Kong, China
12 October; 15:00 (UTC+8)		Boxscore		Bauhinia Court, Central Harbourfront, Hong Kong, China

=== Final ===
12 October; 18:00 (UTC+8)	Japan	0–2	Cuba	Bauhinia Court, Central Harbourfront, Hong Kong, China
12 October; 18:00 (UTC+8)		Boxscore		Bauhinia Court, Central Harbourfront, Hong Kong, China

== Final standings ==
Pos	Team	W	L
Gold medal	Cuba	9	0
Silver medal	Japan	7	2
Bronze medal	France	6	3
4	Venezuela	6	3
5	Chinese Taipei	4	4
6	Mexico	3	5
7	Tunisia	4	4
8	Lithuania	4	4
9	China	4	4
10	Hong Kong	2	6
11	South Africa	1	7
12	Australia	0	8

== Awards ==
Tournament Awards
Award	Player
Female Most Valuable player	(Cuba) Haila González
Male Most Valuable player	(Cuba) Briandy Molina
Best Coach	(Hong Kong) Sergio Pérez Echevarría
#B5High5 Award	Baseball Federation of Japan

All Star Team
Player
(Japan) Harutomo Tsuji
(France) Omar Diodene Pacheco
(Venezuela) Humberto Molina
(Mexico) Valeria Sánchez
(Chinese Taipei) Hsieh Yu-ying
