= Glossary of Baseball5 terms =

This is a glossary of terminology used in Baseball5. Many terms which are used in Baseball5 also appear in baseball (see Glossary of baseball terms).

== B ==
=== Batter's box ===
The batter's box is a square area diagonally adjacent to home plate which the batter must remain in while hitting the ball (the lines are part of the box.) It is drawn by extending the foul lines 3 meters into foul territory.

== F ==
=== Fence ===
See outfield fence.

== M ==
=== Midfielder ===
The midfielder is a defender who stands roughly in between first and third base (around the same region that a baseball pitcher would stand in.)

== N ==
=== No-hit zone ===
The no-hit zone is an area that incorporates the home plate corner of fair territory which is treated equivalently to foul territory i.e. the batter is out if they hit the ball into the ground in this zone. The zone itself is a triangular area, with two of its lines being coterminous with the foul lines and the third line being drawn between two points, each of which is 4.5 meters (or 3 meters for the U-15 age category) down a foul line from the batter's box.

== O ==
=== Outfield fence ===
The outfield fences are the boundary of the field on the edge of the outfield. They are recommended to be 1 meter tall, though there is no requirement to have fences per se as the boundary of the field (i.e. lines can be drawn instead to demarcate the outer boundary of the outfield.)

== S ==
=== Safe area ===
The safe area is an area next to first base in which the batter is safe from being tagged. It is a 1.5-meter rectangle with the same width as first base, being adjacent to the foul territory-first base, and with its longer sides running in the same direction as the first base-foul line.
