= 2024 Baseball5 Asia Cup =

Tournament details
- Country: South Korea
- Dates: 13–16 April
- Teams: 8

Final positions
- Champions: Japan (1st title)
- Runners-up: Chinese Taipei
- Third place: China
- Fourth place: South Korea

The 2024 Baseball5 Asia Cup was the second edition of the Baseball5 Asia Cup, a Baseball5 tournament organized by WBSC Asia. The championship was held from 13 to 16 April 2024, in the Olympic Park in Seoul, South Korea and was contested between eight national teams.

Japan won the tournament, defeating Chinese Taipei 2 sets to 1 in the final game. China claimed the bronze medal, after defeating hosts South Korea 2 sets to 0 in the bronze medal game. Japan, Chinese Taipei and China qualify for the 2024 Baseball5 World Cup in Hong Kong.

== Venue ==
(South Korea) Seoul
Olympic Park
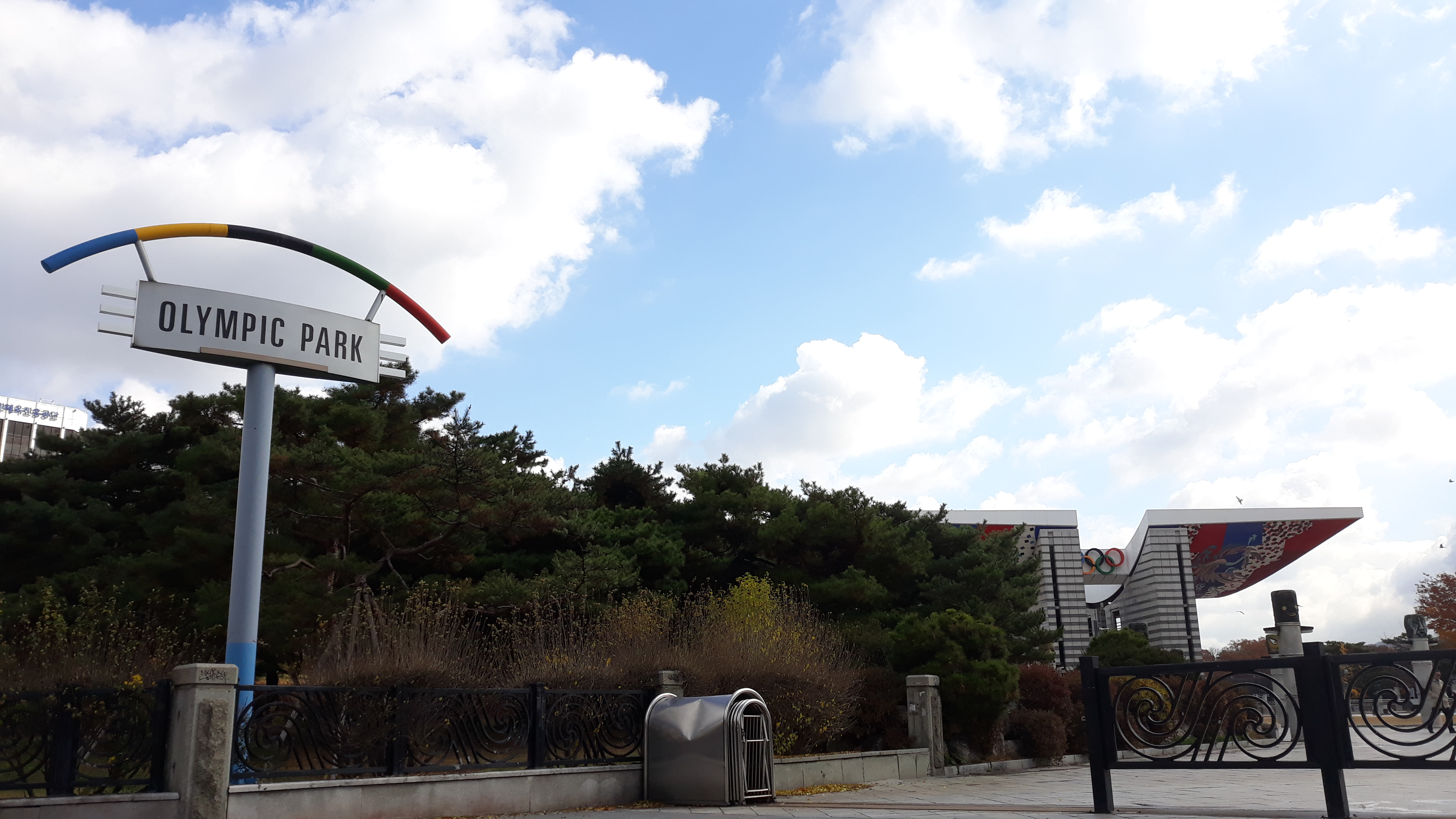

== Opening round ==
=== Group A ===
Pos	Team	Pld	W	L	RF	RA	RD	PCT	GB	Qualification
1	Chinese Taipei	3	3	0	44	8	+36	1.000	—	Advance to Knockout stage
2	South Korea (H)	3	2	1	35	18	+17	.667	1	Advance to Knockout stage
3	Malaysia	3	1	2	17	19	−2	.333	2	Advance to Knockout stage
4	Singapore	3	0	3	3	54	−51	.000	3	Advance to Knockout stage

Source: WBSC Asia
(H) Hosts

=== Group B ===
Pos	Team	Pld	W	L	RF	RA	RD	PCT	GB	Qualification
1	Japan	3	3	0	60	5	+55	1.000	—	Advance to Knockout stage
2	China	3	2	1	40	26	+14	.667	1	Advance to Knockout stage
3	Thailand	3	1	2	33	44	−11	.333	2	Advance to Knockout stage
4	Hong Kong	3	0	3	9	67	−58	.000	3	Advance to Knockout stage

Source: WBSC Asia

== Knockout stage ==
Quarter-finals
Chinese Taipei	6	10
Hong Kong	0	0
China	13	3
Malaysia	5	0
Japan	7	5
Singapore	1	0
South Korea	7	4
Thailand	4	2

Semi-finals
Chinese Taipei	2	3
China	0	2
Japan	7	4
South Korea	0	0

Final
Chinese Taipei	3	1	0
Japan	2	5	4
Bronze medal game
China	2	3
South Korea	1	2

5th place game
Malaysia	2
Thailand	6

7th place game
Hong Kong	3
Singapore	4

== Final standings ==
Pos	Team	W	L	Qualification
Gold medal	Japan	6	0	Qualified for 2024 Baseball5 World Cup
Silver medal	Chinese Taipei	5	1	Qualified for 2024 Baseball5 World Cup
Bronze medal	China	4	2	Qualified for 2024 Baseball5 World Cup
4	South Korea	3	3	
5	Thailand	2	3	
6	Malaysia	1	4	
7	Singapore	1	4	
8	Hong Kong	0	5	
