= Baseball5 World Cup =

Mixed-gender Baseball5 tournament

- Upcoming season or competition: 2026 Baseball5 World Cup
- Sport: Baseball5
- First season: 2022
- Administrator: World Baseball Softball Confederation
- No. of teams: 12
- Most recent champion: Cuba (2nd title) (2024)
- Most titles: Cuba (2 titles)
- Related competitions: Youth Baseball5 World Cup
- Website: baseball5.wbsc.org

The Baseball5 World Cup (B5WC, and sometimes referred to as the Senior Baseball5 World Cup) is a mixed-gender Baseball5 (B5) world championship that occurs every two years, with the first edition held in 2022 in Mexico and contested by 12 countries. It is governed by the World Baseball Softball Confederation (WBSC).

== History ==
The inaugural B5WC was originally planned to happen in December 2020 in Mexico. The COVID-19 pandemic led to the delay of the B5WC to June 2021; however, the continued impact of the pandemic delayed the B5WC further. It was later decided that the WC would be played every two years, starting in 2022.

The 14-team 2020 European Baseball5 Championship held in February and March saw France and Lithuania take the two available Europe berths to qualify for the inaugural B5WC. The Oceania qualifier was scheduled to be played in Australia in 2021. The Asia qualifiers were scheduled to be played in Kuala Lumpur, Malaysia in April 2021, but were then postponed due to COVID-19 to August 17–19, 2022.

The first edition of the tournament, held in Mexico City, was won by Cuba, who finished the championship undefeated.

In April 2023, it was confirmed that Hong Kong will host the second edition of the tournament, from October 7 to 12, 2024. On the eve of the tournament, it was announced that future editions will have 16 teams (split into four groups) and play 56 games total.

In October 2024 it was announced that Rome will host the 2026 tournament.. It was later changed to Puerto Rico.

== Format ==
The 16 countries participating in the World Cup are geographically broken down as follows:

- The host nation automatically qualifies.
- The host nation of the previous edition automatically qualifies.
- 4 countries from the Americas
- 3 from Europe
- 2 from Africa
- 3 from Asia
- 1 from Oceania
- 1 Wild Card (selected by WBSC)

The 16 countries play a total of 56 games over four or five days.

Each team has five active players and eight players total on the roster, with the mixed-gender nature of the tournament requiring teams to have half of their roster to be of each gender, and at least two active players per gender in the game.

Players must be a minimum of 15 years old during the calendar year of the tournament.

== Results ==
Year	Host	Final			Third place game		
Year	Host	Champions	Score	Runners-up	Third place	Score	Fourth place
2022; Details	Mexico City	Cuba	2–0	Japan	Chinese Taipei	2–0	Venezuela
2024; Details	Hong Kong	Cuba	2–0	Japan	France	2–0	Venezuela
2026; Details	(Puerto Rico); San Juan						

=== Medal table ===
Rank	Nation	Gold	Silver	Bronze	Total
1	Cuba	2	0	0	2
2	Japan	0	2	0	2
3	Chinese Taipei	0	0	1	1
3	France	0	0	1	1
Totals (4 entries)		2	2	2	6

== Participating nations ==
- 1st — Champion
- 2nd — Runner-up
- 3rd — Third place
- # — Position
- × — Withdrew
- — Hosts

Teams	(Mexico) 2022	(Hong Kong) 2024	(Puerto Rico) 2026	Years
Argentina	—	—	Debut	0
Australia	x	12th	—	1
China	x	9th	—	1
Chinese Taipei	3rd	5th		2
Cuba	1st	1st		2
Spain	—	—	Debut	0
United States	—	—	Debut	0
France	9th	3rd		2
Hong Kong	12th	10th		2
Japan	2nd	2nd		2
Kenya	8th	x		1
Lithuania	11th	8th	—	2
Mexico	5th	6th		2
Puerto Rico	—	—	Debut	0
South Africa	7th	11th		2
South Korea	10th	x		1
Thailand	—	—	Debut	0
Tunisia	6th	7th		2
Turkey	—	—	Debut	0
Venezuela	4th	4th	—	2
No. of Teams	12	12	16	

== See also ==
- Youth Baseball5 World Cup
- Baseball5 Asia Cup
- Baseball5 European Championship
