= Turkey national baseball5 team =

Turkey

Information
- Country: Turkey
- Confederation: WBSC Europe

WBSC ranking
- Current: 9 ▲1 (6 May 2026)

The Turkey national baseball5 team represents Turkey in international Baseball5 competitions.

== History ==
Baseball5 was first introduced in Turkey in 2019. The country was host for the inaugural 2023 Youth Baseball5 World Cup, where it placed fourth.

Turkey qualified along with France and Lithuania out of Europe for the 2025 Youth Baseball5 World Cup.

== Current roster ==
=== Youth team ===
As of 2022

No.	Pos.	Player	Gender
10	1B	Ela AKTÜRK	F
11	CF	Hayel DAĞDELEN	F
77	SS	Orhan DÜŞÜN	M
6	3B	Elif Evren	F
26	SS	Azizhan ŞENTÜRK	M
19	2B	Mert Tekeci	M
1	CF	Mehmet Sadık TOPÇU	M
9	2B	Sudenaz Turhan	F

==== Staff ====
No.	Pos.	Name
-	Manager	Mayide Aşçı
-	Coach	Mustafa Kayahan
-	Coach	Umut TÜZÜN

== Tournament record ==
=== Youth Baseball5 World Cup ===
2023 - 4th place
