= 2022 Baseball5 Asia Cup =

Tournament details
- Country: Malaysia
- Dates: 16–19 August
- Teams: 9

Final positions
- Champions: Chinese Taipei (1st title)
- Runners-up: Japan
- Third place: South Korea
- Fourth place: Hong Kong

The 2022 Baseball5 Asia Cup was the first edition of the Baseball5 Asia Cup, a Baseball5 tournament organized by WBSC Asia. The championship was held from 16 to 19 August 2022, in Kuala Lumpur, Malaysia and was contested between nine national teams.

Chinese Taipei won the tournament, beating Japan in the final 2 matches to 1. South Korea finished third defeating Hong Kong 2 matches to 0 in the Bronze medal game.

== Venue ==
(Malaysia) Kuala Lumpur
Berjaya Times Square
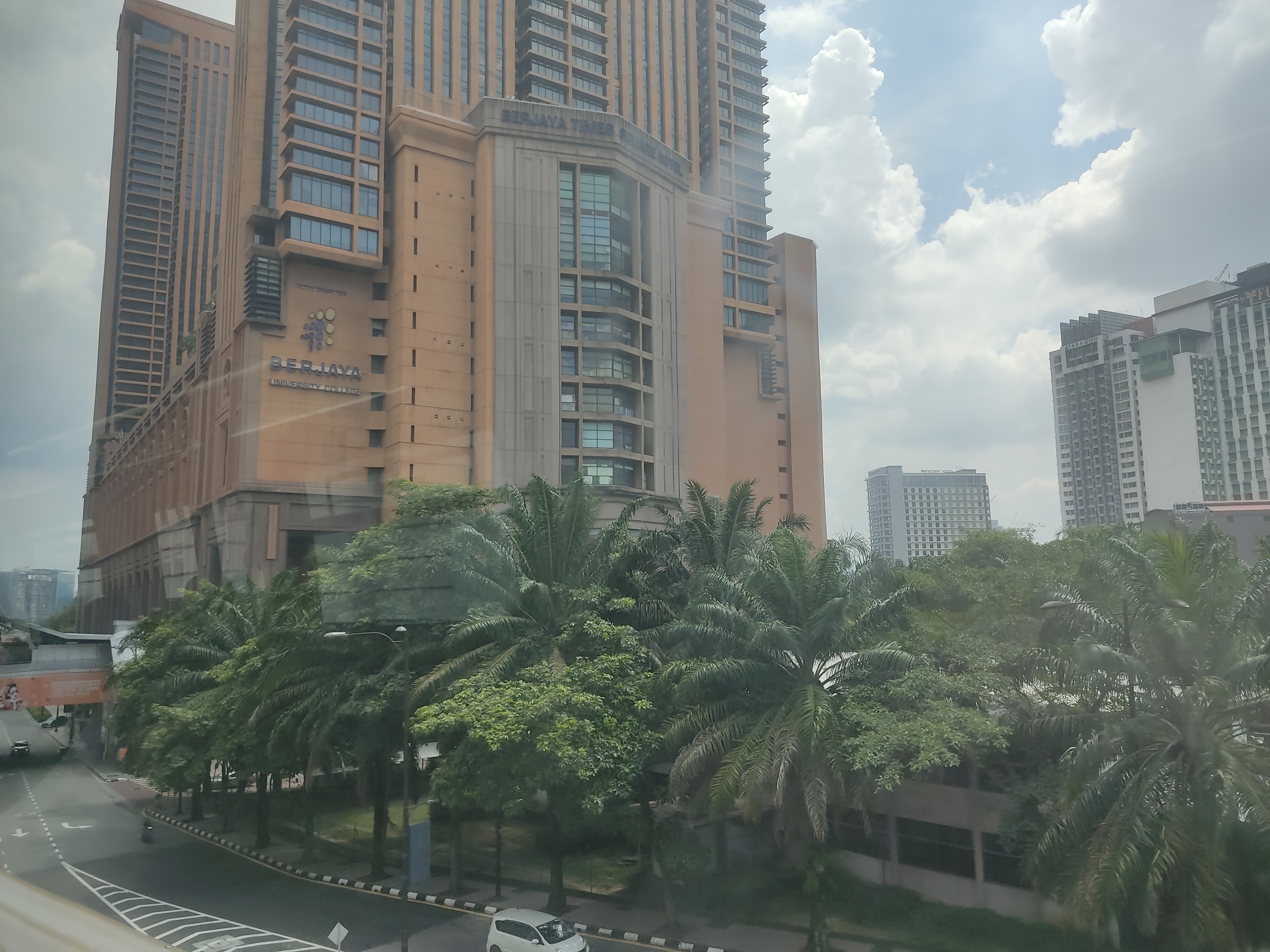

== Opening round ==
=== Group A ===
Pos	Team	Pld	W	L	RF	RA	RD	PCT	GB	Qualification
1	South Korea	2	2	0	19	13	+6	1.000	—	Advance to Super round
2	Malaysia (H)	2	1	1	27	32	−5	.500	1	Advance to Super round
3	Thailand	2	0	2	25	26	−1	.000	2	Advance to Placement round

Source: WBSC Asia
(H) Hosts

=== Group B ===
Pos	Team	Pld	W	L	RF	RA	RD	PCT	GB	Qualification
1	Japan	2	2	0	27	7	+20	1.000	—	Advance to Super round
2	Hong Kong	2	1	1	9	20	−11	.500	1	Advance to Super round
3	Philippines	2	0	2	9	18	−9	.000	2	Advance to Placement round

Source: WBSC Asia

=== Group C ===
Pos	Team	Pld	W	L	RF	RA	RD	PCT	GB	Qualification
1	Chinese Taipei	2	2	0	58	1	+57	1.000	—	Advance to Super round
2	Singapore	2	1	1	12	36	−24	.500	1	Advance to Super round
3	Pakistan	2	0	2	7	40	−33	.000	2	Advance to Placement round

Source: WBSC Asia

== Super round ==
Pos	Team	Pld	W	L	RF	RA	RD	PCT	GB	Qualification
1	Chinese Taipei	4	4	0	54	1	+53	1.000	—	Advance to Semifinals
2	Japan	4	3	1	41	3	+38	.750	1	Advance to Semifinals
3	Hong Kong	4	2	2	19	39	−20	.500	2	Advance to Semifinals
4	South Korea	4	2	2	18	33	−15	.500	2	Advance to Semifinals
5	Malaysia (H)	4	1	3	13	43	−30	.250	3	
6	Singapore	4	0	4	4	30	−26	.000	4	

Source: WBSC Asia
(H) Hosts

== Placement round ==
Pos	Team	Pld	W	L	RF	RA	RD	PCT	GB
1	Thailand	2	2	0	14	4	+10	1.000	—
2	Philippines	2	1	1	9	5	+4	.500	1
3	Pakistan	2	0	2	3	17	−14	.000	2

Source: WBSC Asia

== Playoffs ==
Semifinals
Chinese Taipei	7	11
Hong Kong	1	1
Japan	5	4
South Korea	3	1

Final
Chinese Taipei	2	5	12
Japan	3	2	9
Bronze medal game
Hong Kong	1	8
South Korea	3	9

== Final standings ==
Pos	Team	W	L	Qualification
Gold medal	Chinese Taipei	8	0	Qualified for 2022 Baseball5 World Cup
Silver medal	Japan	6	2	Qualified for 2022 Baseball5 World Cup
Bronze medal	South Korea	5	3	Qualified for 2022 Baseball5 World Cup
4	Hong Kong	3	5	Qualified for 2022 Baseball5 World Cup
5	Malaysia	2	4	
6	Singapore	1	5	
7	Thailand	2	2	
8	Philippines	1	3	
9	Pakistan	0	4	
