= Hong Kong national Baseball5 team =

Hong Kong

Information
- Country: Hong Kong
- Federation: Hong Kong Baseball Association
- Confederation: WBSC Asia
- Manager: Sergio Pérez Echevarría

WBSC ranking
- Current: 24 (31 December 2025)

Baseball5 World Cup
- Appearances: 2 (first in 2022)
- Best result: 10th (1 time, in 2024)

Baseball5 Asia Cup
- Appearances: 2 (first in 2022)
- Best result: 4th (1 time, in 2022)

The Hong Kong national Baseball5 team represents Hong Kong in international Baseball5 competitions.

== History ==
Hong Kong participated in the inaugural Baseball5 Asia Cup in Kuala Lumpur, where they finished fourth after losing the bronze medal game 0 matches to 2 against South Korea.

Hong Kong did not qualify for the 2022 Baseball5 World Cup held in Mexico City, but were invited to participate by the WBSC to replace Australia. They were eliminated in the first round after finishing 0–5. During the placement round, the team won one games and lost two games for a final record of 1–7, finishing in the last place of the championship.

The team participated in the 2024 Baseball5 Asia Cup, held in Seoul, South Korea, finishing last with a 0–5 record.

== Current roster ==
As of 7 October 2024

No.	Pos.	Player	Gender
1	2B	Chan Tsz Ling	F
8	IF	Cheng Hoi Ting	M
4	1B	Tai Man Kwan	F
10	IF	Alvin Tang	M
7	1B	Tse Tsz Chun	M
3	IF	Avis Wong	F
6	IF	Wong Chin Woon	F
9	IF	Yiu Yik Shun	M

=== Staff ===
No.	Pos.	Name
5	Manager	Sergio Pérez Echevarría
--	Coach	Fung Kit Yi

== Tournament record ==
=== Baseball5 World Cup ===
Baseball5 World Cup record
Year	Round	Position	W	L	RS	RA
(Mexico) 2022	Placement round	12th	1	7	37	97
(Hong Kong) 2024	Placement round	10th	2	6	55	146
Total	2/2	–	3	13	92	243

=== Baseball5 Asia Cup ===
Baseball5 Asia Cup record
Year	Round	Position	W	L	RS	RA
(Malaysia) 2022	Semifinals	4th	3	5	39	89
(South Korea) 2024	Placement round	8th	0	5	12	87
Total	2/2	–	3	10	51	176
