= Japan national Baseball5 team =

Japan

Information
- Country: Japan
- Federation: Baseball Federation of Japan
- Confederation: WBSC Asia
- Manager: (Japan) Kenta Wakamatsu

WBSC ranking
- Current: 2 (31 December 2025)

Baseball5 World Cup
- Appearances: 2 (first in 2022)
- Best result: (silver) 2nd (2 times, most recent in 2024)

Baseball5 Asia Cup
- Appearances: 2 (first in 2022)
- Best result: (gold) 1st (1 time, in 2024)

The Japan national Baseball5 team represents Japan in international Baseball5 competitions.

== History ==
In January 2019, the Baseball Federation of Japan held a baseball5 seminar in Tokyo, with the goal of promoting the sport in Japan, specially among the kids, youth and high school and university students.

Japan participated in the inaugural Baseball5 Asia Cup in Kuala Lumpur, where the team finished second after losing to Chinese Taipei 1 match to 2.

Japan qualified for the 2022 Baseball5 World Cup, held in Mexico City. The Japanese team finished second with a 6–3 record after losing the final against Cuba 2 matches to 0.

Japan won the 2024 Baseball5 Asia Cup, held in Seoul, South Korea, to claim their first Asian title. The team finished the tournament undefeated with a 6–0 record and defeated Chinese Taipei 2 sets to 1 in the final game, to win the gold medal.

== Current roster ==
As of 30 July 2024

No.	Pos.	Player	Gender	Club
17	IF	Meiko Karaki	F	(Japan) Junk 5
1	IF	Ayano Kazuta	F	(Japan) 5STARs
5	IF	Shun Mikami	M	(Japan) Junk 5
35	IF	Taichi Motoike	M	(Japan) Tokyo Verdy Bambaataa
0	IF	Miho Oshima	F	(Japan) Junk 5
36	IF	Ayako Rokkaku	F	(Japan) 5STARs
8	IF	Takuya Shima	M	(Japan) Junk 5
6	IF	Harutomo Tsuji	M	(Japan) S. T. J.

=== Staff ===
No.	Pos.	Name
66	Manager	Kenta Wakamatsu
38	Coach	Mizuki Nakahama

== Tournament record ==
=== Baseball5 World Cup ===
Baseball5 World Cup record
Year	Round	Position	W	L	RS	RA
(Mexico) 2022	Final	2nd	6	3	67	63
(Hong Kong) 2024	Final	2nd	7	2	111	49
Total	2/2	–	13	5	178	112

=== Baseball5 Asia Cup ===
Baseball5 Asia Cup record
Year	Round	Position	W	L	RS	RA
(Malaysia) 2022	Final	2nd	6	2	91	33
(South Korea) 2024	Final	1st	6	0	94	10
Total	2/2	–	12	2	185	43
