= South Korea national Baseball5 team =

South Korea

Information
- Country: South Korea
- Federation: Korea Baseball Softball Association
- Confederation: WBSC Asia
- Manager: (South Korea) Myung-joo Cha (2022–present)

WBSC ranking
- Current: 11 ▼1 (31 December 2025)

Baseball5 World Cup
- Appearances: 1 (first in 2022)
- Best result: 10th (1 time, in 2022)

Baseball5 Asia Cup
- Appearances: 2 (first in 2022)
- Best result: (bronze) 3rd (1 time, in 2022)

The South Korea national Baseball5 team represents South Korea in international Baseball5 competitions.

== History ==
South Korea participated in the inaugural Baseball5 Asia Cup in Kuala Lumpur, where they finished third after winning the bronze medal game 2 matches to 0 against Hong Kong.

South Korea qualified for the 2022 Baseball5 World Cup held in Mexico City. The Korean team was eliminated in the first round after finishing 0–5. During the placement round, the team won two games and lost one game for a final record of 2–6, finishing in tenth place in the championship.

South Korea hosted the 2024 Baseball5 Asia Cup, contested at Seoul's Olympic Park. The team finished the opening round second with a 2–1 record. In the knockout stage, South Korea defeated Thailand 2 sets to 0 in the quarter-finals, but lost against Japan in the semifinals. In the bronze medal game, South Korea lost to China, finishing fourth.

== Current roster ==
As of 12 November 2022

No.	Pos.	Player	Gender
7	UTL	Sung-wook Hong	M
10	UTL	Myeong-hwa Jang	F
2	UTL	Su-bin Kim	M
6	UTL	Seo-hyeon Kim	F
1	UTL	So-won Kim	F
11	UTL	Sung-jae Kim	M
16	UTL	Han-byeol Lee	M
12	UTL	Chang-hwa Oh	M

=== Staff ===
No.	Pos.	Name
13	Manager	Myung-joo Cha
--	Coach	Ji-suk Woo

== Tournament record ==
=== Baseball5 World Cup ===
Baseball5 World Cup record
Year	Round	Position	W	L	RS	RA
(Mexico) 2022	Placement round	10th	2	6	40	70
Total	1/1	–	2	6	40	70

=== Baseball5 Asia Cup ===
Baseball5 Asia Cup record
Year	Round	Position	W	L	RS	RA
(Malaysia) 2022	Semifinals	3rd	5	3	53	64
(South Korea) 2024	Semifinals	4th	3	3	49	40
Total	2/2	–	8	6	102	104
