= Cuba national Baseball5 team =

Cuba

Information
- Country: Cuba
- Federation: Baseball Federation of Cuba
- Confederation: WBSC Americas
- Manager: (Cuba) Pablo Terry

WBSC ranking
- Current: 1 (31 December 2025)

Baseball5 World Cup
- Appearances: 2 (first in 2022)
- Best result: (gold) 1st (2 times, most recent in 2024)

Baseball5 Pan American Championship
- Appearances: 1 (first in 2024)
- Best result: (gold) 1st (1 time, in 2024)

The Cuba national Baseball5 team represents Cuba in international Baseball5 competitions. They are the current World and Pan American Champions.

== History ==
Baseball5 was inspired by similar games that have been played on the streets in Latin America and elsewhere for decades, such as "cuatro esquinas" (four corners) in Cuba.

Cuba, alongside Venezuela, were invited by the World Baseball Softball Confederation to represent WBSC Americas in the 2022 Baseball5 World Cup, held in Mexico City. The Cuban team finished the tournament undefeated and won the final against Japan 2 matches to 0. Briandy Molina was honored with the Outstanding Male Player Award and included in the All Star Team of the tournament.

Cuba won the 2024 Baseball5 Pan American Championship held in Barquisimeto, Venezuela. The Cuban squad finished undefeated with a 6–0 record and defeated Mexico in the final 2 sets to 0, qualifying to the 2024 Baseball5 World Cup. Briandy Molina and Chaquira Azpiazu were awarded as the Most Valuable Players of the tournament, while manager Pablo Terry won the Best Coach Award.

== Current roster ==
As of 7 October 2024

No.	Pos.	Player	Gender
25	IF	Orlando Amador	M
2	IF	Lietis Arcia	F
10	IF	Chaquira Azpiazu	F
66	IF	Cristian Basabe	M
3	IF	Yoel Blanco	M
4	IF	Haila González	F
1	IF	Briandy Molina	M
8	IF	Yiliena Otamendez	F

=== Staff ===
No.	Pos.	Name
13	Manager	Pablo Terry
12	Coach	Liorvis Savón

== Tournament record ==
=== Baseball5 World Cup ===
Baseball5 World Cup record
Year	Round	Position	W	L	RS	RA
(Mexico) 2022	Final	1st	9	0	164	16
(Hong Kong) 2024	Final	1st	9	0	141	24
Total	2/2	–	18	0	305	40

=== Baseball5 Pan American Championship ===
Baseball5 Pan American Championship record
Year	Round	Position	W	L	RS	RA
(Venezuela) 2024	Final	1st	7	0	144	29
Total	1/1	–	7	0	144	29
