= WBSC World Rankings =

Ranking system for national teams in baseball and softball

Top 20 rankings

Men's Baseball as of 26 October 2026
Rank	Change	Team	Points
1	Steady	Japan	6349
2	Steady	Chinese Taipei	5301
3	Steady	United States	4293
4	Steady	South Korea	4253
5	Steady	Venezuela	3932
6	Steady	Mexico	3229
7	Steady	Puerto Rico	3144
8	Steady	Dominican Republic	2737
9	Steady	Panama	2694
10	Steady	Australia	2596
11	Steady	Netherlands	2429
12	Steady	Cuba	2002
13	▲1	Italy	1897
14	▼1	Colombia	1896
15	Steady	Nicaragua	1657
16	Steady	Czech Republic	1269
17	Steady	Germany	1158
18	Steady	Canada	886
19	Steady	China	879
20	Steady	Great Britain	862
*Change from 10 August 2026

Women's Softball as of 31 December 2025
Rank	Change	Team	Points
1	Steady	Japan	3649
2	Steady	United States	3490
3	Steady	Puerto Rico	3010
4	Steady	Canada	2667
5	▲1	Chinese Taipei	2276
6	▼1	Netherlands	1988
7	▲1	Mexico	1825
8	▼1	China	1686
9	▲1	Italy	1542
10	▲1	Czech Republic	1520
11	▼1	Australia	1380
12	Steady	Great Britain	1053
13	▲3	Philippines	993
14	▼1	Cuba	906
15	▼1	Spain	860
16	▼1	Venezuela	777
17	Steady	Brazil	602
18	Steady	Peru	554
19	▲1	Germany	464
20	▲1	Israel	451
*Change from 9 October 2025

The WBSC World Rankings is a ranking system for national teams in baseball, softball, and baseball5. The teams of the member nations of the World Baseball Softball Confederation (WBSC), the world governing body for both sports, are ranked based on their tournament results with the most successful teams being ranked highest. A point system is used, with points being awarded based on the results of WBSC-recognized international tournaments. Under the existing system, rankings are based on a team's performance over the last four years, with major international tournaments awarded a higher weighting compared to minor international and continental tournaments.

Five rankings are published by the WBSC, they are: Men's Baseball, Women's Baseball, Women's Softball, Men's Softball, and Baseball5 (co-ed).

== History ==
In January 2009, the International Baseball Federation (IBAF) first published a listing in rank order of its member associations to provide a basis for comparison of the relative strengths of these teams. Though primarily focused on the respective men's senior teams of member nations, the rankings also include points awarded based on results at the U-18 Baseball World Cup, U-15 Baseball World Cup, and U-12 Baseball World Cup held during the tracking period. Following the merger with softball in 2013, the WBSC is also responsible for ranking international men's and women's softball teams. Beginning in 2015, the rankings also determine which 12 men's baseball teams participate in the WBSC Premier12 tournament.

In 2025, the WBSC began using a new ranking methodology. Only the most recent edition of any event are included in the rankings, and teams will keep the ranking points from any event for four years.

== Men's ==
=== Baseball ===
==== Men's ranking leaders ====
WBSC World Men's Ranking Leaders

Teams ranking in the top five
Date	First	Second	Third	Fourth	Fifth
31 December 2012	Cuba	United States	Japan	South Korea	Chinese Taipei
31 December 2014	Japan	United States	Cuba	Chinese Taipei	Netherlands
31 December 2016	Japan	United States	South Korea	Chinese Taipei	Cuba
25 September 2018	United States	Japan	South Korea	Cuba	Chinese Taipei
17 December 2018	Japan	United States	South Korea	Chinese Taipei	Cuba
31 December 2019	Japan	United States	South Korea	Chinese Taipei	Mexico
18 March 2020	Japan	United States	South Korea	Chinese Taipei	Mexico
28 June 2021	Japan	Chinese Taipei	South Korea	United States	Mexico
11 August 2021	Japan	South Korea	Chinese Taipei	United States	Mexico
31 December 2021	Japan	Chinese Taipei	South Korea	Mexico	United States
31 December 2022	Japan	Chinese Taipei	United States	South Korea	Mexico
28 March 2023	Japan	United States	Mexico	Chinese Taipei	South Korea
15 August 2023	Japan	United States	Mexico	South Korea	Chinese Taipei
5 October 2023	Japan	United States	Mexico	South Korea	Chinese Taipei
2 November 2023	Japan	Mexico	United States	South Korea	Chinese Taipei
18 December 2023	Japan	Mexico	United States	South Korea	Chinese Taipei
31 December 2023	Japan	Mexico	United States	South Korea	Chinese Taipei
3 September 2024	Japan	Mexico	Chinese Taipei	United States	Venezuela
18 September 2024	Japan	Mexico	Chinese Taipei	Venezuela	United States
27 November 2024	Japan	Chinese Taipei	Venezuela	Mexico	United States
31 December 2024	Japan	Chinese Taipei	Venezuela	Mexico	United States
23 July 2025	Japan	Chinese Taipei	United States	South Korea	Mexico
5 August 2025	Japan	Chinese Taipei	United States	South Korea	Mexico
19 September 2025	Japan	Chinese Taipei	United States	South Korea	Venezuela
11 November 2025	Japan	Chinese Taipei	United States	South Korea	Venezuela
31 December 2025	Japan	Chinese Taipei	United States	South Korea	Venezuela
26 March 2026	Japan	Chinese Taipei	United States	South Korea	Venezuela

The November 2023 rankings included 80. This increased to 83 at the end of 2025.

==== Best Movers ====
Top five movers per ranking
Date	First	Second	Third	Fourth	Fifth
31 December 2014	Israel	Curaçao	Iran	Slovenia	Austria
31 December 2016	Guatemala	Slovakia	Sweden	Poland	Lithuania
25 September 2018	Israel	Indonesia	El Salvador	Sri Lanka	Honduras
17 December 2018	Curaçao	U.S. Virgin Islands	Aruba	South Africa	Venezuela
31 December 2019	American Samoa	Guam	Greece	Great Britain	Spain
18 March 2020	Guam	El Salvador	New Zealand	Honduras	Peru
28 June 2021	Switzerland	Honduras	Indonesia	Aruba	Nigeria
11 August 2021	Slovenia	Ireland	Croatia	Uganda	American Samoa
31 December 2021	Sweden	Hungary	Croatia	Great Britain	Venezuela
31 December 2022	Northern Mariana Islands	Bahamas	Curaçao	Bulgaria	Palau
28 March 2023	Costa Rica	Bangladesh	Honduras	China	Kenya
15 August 2023	Palestine	Ecuador	Indonesia	Norway	Afghanistan
5 October 2023	Switzerland	Greece	Sweden	Croatia	Ukraine
2 November 2023	Panama	Colombia	South Africa	Laos	El Salvador
18 December 2023	Pakistan	Palestine	Hong Kong	Costa Rica	Philippines
31 December 2023	Norway	Finland	—N/a		
9 March 2024	Bahamas	Poland	Serbia	Romania	Tied (Note: Ireland, Slovenia, Norway)
18 September 2024	El Salvador	Tied (Note: Sri Lanka and Costa Rica)		Venezuela	United States
27 November 2024	U.S. Virgin Islands	Chile	Singapore	Tied (Note: Curaçao and Australia)	
11 November 2025	Tied (Note: Palau and Costa Rica)		Poland	Honduras	Palestine
31 December 2025	Peru	Ecuador	Indonesia	Guatemala	Uganda

=== Softball ===
Top 20 Rankings as of 14 May 2026
Rank	Change	Team	Points
1	Steady	Japan	3128
2	Steady	Venezuela	2797
3	▲1	Canada	2347
4	▲1	United States	2262
5	▼2	Argentina	2146
6	▲2	Mexico	1955
7	Steady	New Zealand	1884
8	▼2	Australia	1828
9	Steady	Czech Republic	1466
10	▲1	Dominican Republic	1027
11	▼1	Singapore	980
12	▲1	Colombia	796
13	▼1	Guatemala	660
14	▲5	Denmark	486
15	▼1	South Africa	425
16	▼1	Hong Kong	371
17	▲5	Panama	308
18	▼1	Philippines	290
19	▼1	Chinese Taipei	289
20	Steady	Netherlands	239
*Change from 31 December 2025

== Women's ==
=== Softball ===
==== Women's ranking leaders ====
WBSC World Women's Ranking Leaders

Teams ranking in the top five
Date	First	Second	Third	Fourth	Fifth
31 December 2016	Japan	United States	Canada	Australia	New Zealand
17 December 2018	United States	Japan	Canada	Puerto Rico	Mexico
31 December 2019	United States	Japan	Canada	Puerto Rico	Mexico
1 January 2020	United States	Japan	Canada	Puerto Rico	Mexico
28 June 2021	United States	Japan	Canada	Puerto Rico	Mexico
11 August 2021	Japan	United States	Canada	Mexico	Puerto Rico
31 December 2021	United States	Japan	Canada	Mexico	Puerto Rico
31 December 2022	United States	Japan	Chinese Taipei	Canada	Puerto Rico
12 April 2023	United States	Japan	Chinese Taipei	Puerto Rico	Canada
31 July 2023	United States	Japan	Puerto Rico	Canada	Chinese Taipei
10 November 2023	United States	Japan	Puerto Rico	Chinese Taipei	Canada
31 December 2023	United States	Japan	Puerto Rico	Chinese Taipei	Canada
30 March 2024	United States	Puerto Rico	Japan	Chinese Taipei	Canada
23 July 2024	United States	Japan	Puerto Rico	Chinese Taipei	Canada
11 September 2024	United States	Japan	Puerto Rico	Chinese Taipei	Netherlands
31 December 2024	United States	Japan	Puerto Rico	Chinese Taipei	Netherlands
23 July 2025	Japan	United States	Puerto Rico	Canada	Chinese Taipei
26 August 2025	Japan	United States	Puerto Rico	Canada	Chinese Taipei
9 October 2025	Japan	United States	Puerto Rico	Canada	Netherlands
31 December 2025	Japan	United States	Puerto Rico	Canada	Chinese Taipei

The WBSC ranked 65 countries in softball in 2024 and 70 in 2025.

==== Best Movers ====
Top five movers per ranking
Date	First	Second	Third	Fourth	Fifth
17 December 2018	South Africa	Ireland	India	Mexico	Dominican Republic
31 December 2019	Belgium	Germany	Poland	Spain	Ireland
28 June 2021	Croatia	Germany	Slovakia	Spain	Russia
11 August 2021	Cuba	Indonesia	Hong Kong	Botswana	Curaçao
31 December 2021	Denmark	Peru	Belgium	Slovakia	Sweden
31 December 2022	Argentina	El Salvador	Slovakia	Greece	Israel
12 April 2023	Singapore	Philippines	South Korea	Thailand	Botswana
31 July 2023	Cuba	Curaçao	Botswana	Venezuela	South Africa
10 November 2023	Philippines	Singapore	Hong Kong	Belgium	Hungary
31 December 2023	Dominican Republic	Colombia	Guatemala	Chile	Ecuador
31 December 2024	Sweden	Switzerland	Belgium	Colombia	Greece

=== Baseball ===
Top 20 Rankings as of 9 September 2026
Rank	Change	Team	Points
1	Steady	Japan	2075
2	Steady	United States	1428
3	Steady	Canada	1365
4	▲1	Venezuela	1248
5	▲1	Chinese Taipei	1234
6	▼2	Mexico	990
7	▲3	Australia	692
8	▲4	South Korea	689
9	▼1	Hong Kong	605
10	▼3	Cuba	535
11	▲10	Philippines	516
12	▼3	Puerto Rico	342
13	▼2	Indonesia	333
14	▼1	India	301
15	Steady	Great Britain	260
16	▲3	China	247
17	▼1	Thailand	214
18	▼1	Pakistan	207
19	▼5	France	164
20	Steady	Sri Lanka	141
*Change from 31 December 2025

Japan has ranked #1 in every women's baseball ranking since 2011.

In the wake of the International Olympic Committee's decision to cut baseball from the 2012 Olympics program, the IBAF pushed the growth of women's baseball to include a women's component in its bid for a reinstatement of the sport in future Olympics. The effort to unify the sports resulted in the merger of the IBAF with the International Softball Federation in 2013 to create the WBSC.

The initial women's baseball rankings were based upon results from past Women's Baseball World Cups. While the calculations of the women's rankings are similar to that of the men's, one difference was that they included the three most recent IBAF Women's Baseball World Cups whereas the men's rankings only included the last two. Points are weighted in favor of the more recent results. As of 2025, all WBSC rankings use a four-year cycle.

== Coed ==
=== Baseball5 ===
Baseball5 is a mixed-gender sport, with each team of 5 active players having at least 2 players of either gender.

Top 20 Rankings as of 7 August 2026
Rank	Change	Team	Points
1	Steady	Cuba	5827
2	Steady	Chinese Taipei	4801
3	▲1	France	4636
4	▼1	Japan	4385
5	▲1	Mexico	3843
6	Steady	Tunisia	3790
7	Steady	Venezuela	3324
8	▲1	Turkey	3130
9	▼1	Lithuania	2863
10	Steady	Kenya	2430
11	▲1	Spain	2135
12	▼1	South Korea	2127
13	Steady	South Africa	1621
14	Steady	Italy	1472
15	Steady	Hong Kong	1316
16	Steady	Thailand	1205
17	Steady	Netherlands	1130
18	Steady	Romania	1123
19	Steady	China	1120
20	Steady	Ghana	1055
*Change from 6 May 2026

== Calculation method ==
=== Men's baseball ===
Points are awarded in the men's baseball rankings according to finishes in the Premier12, World Baseball Classic, U-23 Baseball World Cup, U-18 Baseball World Cup, U-15 Baseball World Cup and U-12 Baseball World Cup as follows. These rankings were adjusted in 2025.

==== Premier12 ====
Final rank	1	2	3	4	5	6	7	8	9	10	11	12
Points	1380	1102	1004	906	808	710	612	514	416	318	220	122

==== World Baseball Classic ====
Final rank	1	2	3	4	5	6	7	8	9	10	11	12	13	14	15	16	17	18	19	20
Points	1150	953	905	858	811	763	716	668	621	574	526	479	432	384	337	289	242	195	147	100

==== U-23 Baseball World Cup ====
Final rank	1	2	3	4	5	6	7	8	9	10	11	12
Points	690	551	502	453	404	355	306	257	208	159	110	61

==== U-18 Baseball World Cup ====
Final rank	1	2	3	4	5	6	7	8	9	10	11	12
Points	575	459	418	377	336	295	254	213	172	131	90	49

==== U-15 Baseball World Cup ====
Final rank	1	2	3	4	5	6	7	8	9	10	11	12
Points	460	367	334	301	268	235	202	169	136	103	70	37

==== U-12 Baseball World Cup ====
Final rank	1	2	3	4	5	6	7	8	9	10	11	12
Points	345	275	250	225	200	175	150	125	100	75	50	25

== Controversies ==
Criticism of the WBSC World Ranking focus on how the rankings are calculated and how each countries' strengths are often misrepresented.

The current system strongly favors the winners of the WBSC Premier12, awarding 1380 points. This is greater than that of winning the World Baseball Classic (WBC), which awards just 1150 points. This practice has led to some controversies, as players on the active roster for Major League Baseball (MLB), arguably the world's best players, do not participate in the Premier12. This in turn causes the ranking to be disproportionately unfavorable to countries with more players in MLB, such as the United States or the Dominican Republic. The Dominican Republic, despite winning the 2013 WBC, have never been in the top 5 rankings, despite having the second most active players in MLB, behind the U.S.

Additionally, the current rankings system includes junior competitions, such as the U-12 Baseball World Cup. Critics argue that this practice alters the rankings to misrepresent how well the senior men's team perform by including irrelevant competitions within the ranking.

== See also ==
- Baseball awards § World
