= Baseball Federation of Japan =

Japanese baseball organization

- 全日本野球協会
- Abbreviation: BFJ
- Formation: June 20, 1990; 36 years ago
- Purpose: Represents baseball in Japan
- Location: Shinjuku, Tokyo, Japan
- Services: Organization of baseball throughout Japan and overseas
- President: Masatake Yamanaka
- Website: www.baseballjapan.org

The Baseball Federation of Japan (BFJ) (全日本野球協会, Zen'nihon Yakyū Kyōkai) is the governing body of amateur baseball in Japan. It organizes Japanese amateur baseball throughout Japan and overseas. The federation was created by the merger of the Japan Amateur Baseball Association (JABA) and the Japan Student Baseball Association (JSBA) on 20 June 1990. In 2003, there were 160,000 people playing baseball in around 5,000 teams across Japan. As of 2015, the BFJ represents six international teams: senior, women, university, high school/18U, 15U, and 12U.

Japan is one of the few countries that fields both amateur and professional versions of its national baseball team. The amateur squad competes in most international tournaments, while professional players are typically selected for major events such as the Olympics, the WBSC Premier12 and the World Baseball Classic (WBC). Since 2016, the top-level "Samurai Japan" program has been run jointly with Nippon Professional Baseball (NPB) through the Japan Baseball Council.

Japan has been highly successful in international competition. The senior team has won the World Baseball Classic three times (2006, 2009 and 2023), the Premier12 in 2019, and the gold medal at the 2020 Olympic Games. It finished runner-up to Chinese Taipei at the 2024 WBSC Premier12. At the 2026 World Baseball Classic, Japan won all four of its Pool C games in Tokyo but lost 8–5 to Venezuela in the quarter-finals in Miami, its earliest exit in the tournament's history. The women's national team won its seventh consecutive Women's Baseball World Cup title in 2024, defeating the United States 11–6 in the final.

== History ==
The Industrial League (JABA) and student baseball (high school and college) had been run separately since before World War II. In 1954, they formed the Japan Amateur Baseball Federation to organize and represent a Japanese team at the first Asian Baseball Championship in the Philippines. In 1966, after participating in six Asian Baseball Championships, the Japan Amateur Baseball Federation was disbanded and reorganized into the Japan Amateur Baseball International Committee in 1967.

Beginning in 1984, baseball was being considered as an Olympic sport. After being featured as a demonstration sport at the Los Angeles (1984) and Seoul (1988) Summer Olympics, baseball became a regular Olympic sport beginning with the 1992 Games in Barcelona. These developments prompted the unification of the JABA and JSBA into the Baseball Federation of Japan on 20 June 1990. The BFJ joined the Japanese Olympic Committee, the International Baseball Federation (IBAF; merged into the World Baseball Softball Confederation in 2013), and the Baseball Federation of Asia.

On 1 April 2013, the federation became a general incorporated foundation and adopted its current Japanese name, 全日本野球協会; the All-Japan Rubber Baseball Federation joined at the same time. On 1 May 2016, the BFJ and NPB jointly established the Japan Baseball Council.

Masatake Yamanaka, a former Olympic bronze-medal-winning manager and Japanese Baseball Hall of Fame inductee, has served as president since May 2018.

== Organization ==
As of 2015, the BFJ had four subcommittees: the National Team Commission, Umpiring Commission, Sport and Environment Commission, and Anti-Doping Commission. It was also represented in six international posts: IBAF 1st Vice President, Baseball Federation of Asia Vice President, and seats on the IBAF Tournaments Commission, Medical/Anti-Doping Commission, Women's Development Commission and Athletes Commission.

== Senior national team managers ==
As of 30 September 2026

| Nationality / Name | Tenure | Ref. |
|---|---|---|
| (Japan) Hideki Kuriyama | 2021–2023 | |
| (Japan) Hirokazu Ibata | 2023–2026 | |
| (Japan) Tadahito Iguchi | 2026–present | |

Iguchi was appointed on 25 July 2026, after Ibata left at the end of his contract in May 2026. He is the first Samurai Japan manager to have played in both NPB and Major League Baseball.

== See also ==
- Baseball in Japan
- Japan national baseball team
- Japan women's national baseball team
- Japan Amateur Baseball Association
