= Mexico national Baseball5 team =

Mexico

Information
- Country: Mexico
- Confederation: WBSC Americas
- Manager: Orlando Valle

WBSC ranking
- Current: 6 (31 December 2025)

Baseball5 World Cup
- Appearances: 2 (first in 2022)
- Best result: 5th (1 time, in 2022)

Baseball5 Pan American Championship
- Appearances: 1 (first in 2024)
- Best result: (silver) 2nd (1 time, in 2024)

The Mexico national Baseball5 team represents Mexico in international Baseball5 competitions.

== History ==
Mexico qualified as hosts of the inaugural Baseball5 World Cup, where they finished fifth with a 4–4 record. The team participated in the historic first game of tournament, defeating Lithuania 5–3 and 4–2. Mexico finished the tournament fifth with a 4–4 record. Marián Castro was selected as part of the championship's All Star Team.

Mexico finished second at the 2024 Baseball5 Pan American Championship held in Barquisimeto, Venezuela. The Mexican squad defeated Venezuela in the semifinal 2 sets to 1, but lost in the final against Cuba, 0–2.

== Current roster ==
As of 7 October 2024

No.	Pos.	Player	Gender
20	IF	Luis Bencomo	M
2	UTL	Áurea Fernández	F
57	UTL	Olivia Frías	F
4	UTL	Omar López	M
12	UTL	Yahir Ochoa	M
26	UTL	Yeismy Sánchez	F
1	UTL	Javier Santos	M
25	UTL	Andrea Sarmiento	F

=== Staff ===
No.	Pos.	Name
--	Manager	Orlando Valle

== Tournament record ==
=== Baseball5 World Cup ===
Baseball5 World Cup record
Year	Round	Position	W	L	RS	RA
(Mexico) 2022	Super round	5th	4	4	33	77
(Hong Kong) 2024	Super round	6th	3	5	58	71
Total	2/2	–	7	9	91	148

=== Baseball5 Pan American Championship ===
Baseball5 Pan American Championship record
Year	Round	Position	W	L	RS	RA
(Venezuela) 2024	Final	2nd	3	5	69	119
Total	1/1	–	3	5	69	119
