= 2022 Baseball5 World Cup =

Baseball5 tournament

Tournament details
- Country: Mexico
- Dates: 7–12 November
- Teams: 12

Final positions
- Champions: Cuba (1st title)
- Runners-up: Japan
- Third place: Chinese Taipei
- Fourth place: Venezuela

Tournament statistics
- Games played: 50

Awards
- MVP: (Cuba) Briandy Molina (Japan) Ayako Rokkaku

The 2022 Baseball5 World Cup was the first edition of the Baseball5 World Cup, the mixed-gender Baseball5 (B5) world championship organized by the World Baseball Softball Confederation (WBSC). It was held in Mexico City from 7 to 12 November 2022. Twelve teams took part.

Cuba won the tournament, beating Japan in the final 2 matches to 0. Chinese Taipei finished third defeating Venezuela 2 matches to 0 in the bronze medal game.

== Qualification ==
Event	Dates	Location(s)	Berth(s)	Qualified
Host nation	—	—	1	Mexico
Baseball5 European Championship	28 February–1 March 2020	(Lithuania) Vilnius	2	France; Lithuania
Baseball5 African Championship	23–26 May 2022	(Tanzania) Dar es Salaam	2	South Africa; Kenya
Baseball5 Asia Cup	17–19 August 2022	(Malaysia) Kuala Lumpur	4	Chinese Taipei; Japan; South Korea; Hong Kong^{2}
WBSC Americas^{1}	—	—	2	Cuba; Venezuela
~~WBSC Oceania^{1}~~	—	—	~~1~~	~~Australia~~
Wild card	—	—	1	Tunisia
Total			12	

^{1}There was no qualification event for WBSC Americas and WBSC Oceania. Teams were selected by World Baseball Softball Confederation.
^{2}In October 2022, WBSC chose Hong Kong to replace Australia.

== Venues ==
Group A, Group B, Super Round & Placement Round
Mexico City, Mexico
Zócalo
Capacity: 4,000 (in two courts)

== Opening round ==
=== Group A ===
Pos	Team	Pld	W	L	RF	RA	RD	PCT	GB	Qualification
1	Cuba	5	5	0	93	8	+85	1.000	—	Advance to Super round
2	Japan	5	3	2	35	23	+12	.600	2	Advance to Super round
3	Mexico (H)	5	3	2	24	52	−28	.600	2	Advance to Super round
4	Lithuania	5	2	3	45	48	−3	.400	3	Advance to Placement round
5	South Africa	5	2	3	32	45	−13	.400	3	Advance to Placement round
6	Hong Kong	5	0	5	10	63	−53	.000	5	Advance to Placement round

Source: WBSC
(H) Hosts

=== Group B ===
Pos	Team	Pld	W	L	RF	RA	RD	PCT	GB	Qualification
1	Venezuela	5	5	0	53	32	+21	1.000	—	Advance to Super round
2	Chinese Taipei	5	4	1	69	21	+48	.800	1	Advance to Super round
3	Tunisia	5	2	3	47	39	+8	.400	3	Advance to Super round
4	France	5	2	3	42	62	−20	.400	3	Advance to Placement round
5	Kenya	5	2	3	34	57	−23	.400	3	Advance to Placement round
6	South Korea	5	0	5	13	47	−34	.000	5	Advance to Placement round

Source: WBSC

== Second round ==
=== Super round ===
Pos	Team	Pld	W	L	RF	RA	RD	PCT	GB	Qualification
1	Cuba	5	5	0	94	7	+87	1.000	—	Advance to Gold medal game
2	Japan	5	4	1	40	36	+4	.800	1	Advance to Gold medal game
3	Venezuela	5	3	2	34	44	−10	.600	2	Advance to Bronze medal game
4	Chinese Taipei	5	2	3	45	45	0	.400	3	Advance to Bronze medal game
5	Mexico (H)	5	1	4	13	65	−52	.200	4	
6	Tunisia	5	0	5	30	59	−29	.000	5	

Source: WBSC
(H) Hosts

=== Placement round ===
Pos	Team	Pld	W	L	RF	RA	RD	PCT	GB
1	South Africa	5	5	0	47	20	+27	1.000	—
2	Kenya	5	4	1	49	32	+17	.800	1
3	France	5	2	3	43	38	+5	.400	3
4	South Korea	5	2	3	33	40	−7	.400	3
5	Lithuania	5	1	4	36	53	−17	.200	4
6	Hong Kong	5	1	4	33	58	−25	.200	4

Source: WBSC

== Final standings ==
Pos	Team	W	L
Gold medal	Cuba	9	0
Silver medal	Japan	6	3
Bronze medal	Chinese Taipei	6	3
4	Venezuela	6	3
5	Mexico	4	4
6	Tunisia	2	6
7	South Africa	5	3
8	Kenya	4	4
9	France	3	5
10	South Korea	2	6
11	Lithuania	2	6
12	Hong Kong	1	7

== Awards ==
Tournament Awards
Award	Player
Outstanding Female Player	(Japan) Ayako Rokkaku
Outstanding Male Player	(Cuba) Briandy Molina
Best Coach	(Japan) Ayako Rokkaku
#B5High5 Award	(Japan) Takeru Miyanohara

All Star Team
Player
(Cuba) Briandy Molina
(Japan) Ayako Rokkaku
(Chinese Taipei) Chi-Ting-Huan Shih
(Mexico) Marián Castro
(South Africa) Louis Michael Albertyn
