= Chinese Taipei national Baseball5 team =

National Baseball5 team

Chinese Taipei

Information
- Country: Taiwan
- Confederation: WBSC Asia
- Manager: Lin Po-yu

WBSC ranking
- Current: 2 (7 August 2026)

Baseball5 World Cup
- Appearances: 2 (first in 2022)
- Best result: (bronze) 3rd (1 time, in 2022)

Baseball5 Asia Cup
- Appearances: 2 (first in 2022)
- Best result: (gold) 1st (1 time, in 2022)

The Chinese Taipei national Baseball5 team represents Taiwan in international Baseball5 competitions. They are the current Asian champions.

== History ==
Chinese Taipei participated in the inaugural Baseball5 Asia Cup in Kuala Lumpur, where the team won the tournament after defeating Japan 2 matches to 1.

The team qualified for the 2022 Baseball5 World Cup held in Mexico City as Asian champions. Chinese Taipei won the bronze medal defeating Venezuela 2 matches to 0 and finished with a 6–3 record.

== Current roster ==
As of 7 October 2024

No.	Pos.	Player	Gender
42	IF	Chiu Chun	M
6	IF	Chiu Yi-ling	F
7	IF	Chung Yi-yun	F
1	IF	Hsieh Yu-ying	F
5	IF	Kao Chia-yi	F
56	IF	Li Cheng-hsun	M
47	IF	Shih Chi-ting-huan	M
17	IF	Tu Yu-hao	M

=== Staff ===
No.	Pos.	Name
29	Manager	Lin Po-yu
21	Coach	Yang Yi-shan

== Tournament record ==
=== Baseball5 World Cup ===
Baseball5 World Cup record
Year	Round	Position	W	L	RS	RA
(Mexico) 2022	Semifinals	3rd	6	3	107	53
(Hong Kong) 2024	Super round	5th	4	4	75	62
Total	2/2	–	10	7	182	115

=== Baseball5 Asia Cup ===
Baseball5 Asia Cup record
Year	Round	Position	W	L	RS	RA
(Malaysia) 2022	Final	1st	8	0	149	18
(South Korea) 2024	Final	2nd	5	1	69	21
Total	2/2	–	13	1	218	39
