= World Baseball Softball Confederation =

International governing body for baseball and softball

- Abbreviation: WBSC
- Founded: 14 April 2013; 13 years ago
- Merger of: International Baseball Federation (IBAF) and International Softball Federation (ISF)
- Type: Sports federation
- Legal status: Governing body of baseball, softball, and blind baseball
- Headquarters: Pully, Switzerland
- Location: Av. du Général Guisan 45
- Region served: Worldwide
- Members: 141 national federations; 7 professional league "associate members"
- Official language: English, French, Spanish, Chinese, Japanese, Korean
- President: Riccardo Fraccari
- Main organ: Congress
- Subsidiaries: WBSC Africa; WBSC Americas; WBSC Asia; WBSC Europe; WBSC Oceania
- Affiliations: International Olympic Committee, ARISF, SportAccord
- Website: wbsc.org

The World Baseball Softball Confederation (WBSC) is the international governing body for the sports of baseball, softball, baseball5 and blind baseball. It was established in 2013 by the merger of the International Baseball Federation (IBAF) and International Softball Federation (ISF). Under the WBSC's organizational structure, the IBAF and ISF serve as the confederation's baseball and softball divisions, respectively. Each division is governed by an executive committee, while the WBSC is governed by an executive board.

The WBSC has 208 National Federation members in 141 countries and territories across Asia, Africa, the Americas, Europe, and Oceania. Professional baseball organizations as well as youth organizations are also included and form an arm of the WBSC as associate members. Headquartered in Pully, Switzerland, the WBSC was granted recognition as the sole competent global authority for both the sports of baseball and softball by the International Olympic Committee (IOC) in 2013.

As the recognised governing body of baseball, softball, and Baseball5, the WBSC is charged with overseeing all international competitions. It holds the exclusive rights of all competitions, tournaments and world championships featuring national teams, including the Olympic Games, and WBSC-associated federations hold the right to organize and select national teams

Discussions to merge the two separate world governing bodies for the sports of baseball and softball were sparked by a Memorandum of Understanding that saw baseball and softball leaders agree to form a joint bid to be added to the 2020 Olympic Games sports program. Baseball and softball were dropped from the 2012 Summer Olympic program and were scheduled to be reinstated for the 2020 Olympics, but the 2020 Olympics were delayed due to the COVID-19 pandemic. In August 2021, the IOC announced that baseball and softball would not be part of the 2024 Paris Olympics. Baseball5 is still set to feature in the 2026 Youth Olympics.

== History ==
Flag of the WBSC

Following its exclusion of baseball and softball from the Summer Olympics in 2005, the IOC reclassified baseball and softball as two disciplines of the same sport. As the IOC's guidance indicated the necessity for baseball and softball to be jointly considered for reinstatement in the Olympic programme, the two independent International Federations set out on a path toward a full and complete merger.

In 2012, the International Baseball Federation (IBAF) and the International Softball Federation (ISF) laid out the essential ground rules for partnership and began working on a constitution that would guide the merger and provide a framework for governance, ethics and operations. At a historic IBAF Congress in Tokyo in April 2013, the Constitution was ratified and since it had already been approved by an ISF working group empowered to do so, the WBSC was officially formalized and empowered.

The creation of a single federation allowed for the permanent alignment, merger and management of baseball and softball at the world level. The merger resulted in an immediate boost to the governance, universality and gender equality of baseball and softball, criteria for an Olympic sport that are heavily valued by the IOC.

At the first-ever World Baseball Softball Congress—in Hammamet, Tunisia—Italy's Fraccari was elected to a seven-year term as the first president of WBSC, along with a fully elected Executive Board.

=== Creation of Baseball5 ===
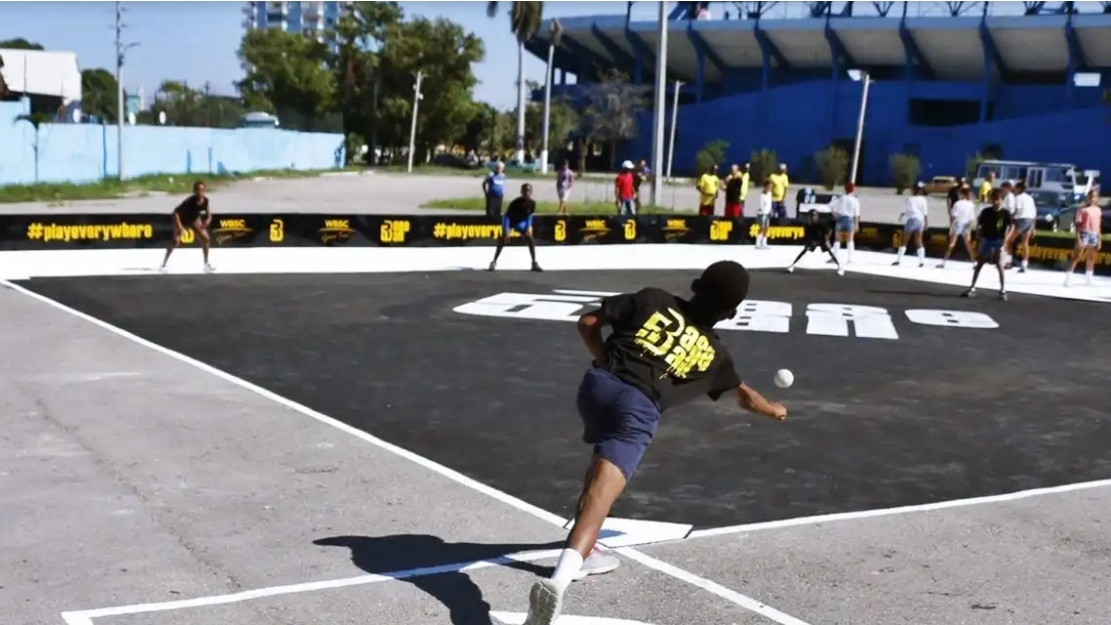
B5 batter hitting the ball into field.

In 2017, the WBSC introduced a third discipline to be played at an international level, Baseball5 (B5), which is a five-on-five, five-inning game designed to be played with only a rubber ball on a small field. It is targeted at underserved communities, as well as offering a low-cost and fast-paced entry point to baseball and softball in new places around the world. The WBSC introduced it to aid its ultimate goal of having a billion-strong baseball-softball community by 2030. A major difference between B5 and baseball/softball is that the game is played without a pitcher, with the batter starting each play with the ball. It was inspired by various Latin American street games, such as "cuatro esquinas" (four corners) in Cuba, and has been played in some international tournaments in the Americas and Europe, as well as having been implemented in some schools in various countries. It is due to feature in the 2026 Youth Olympic Games, and has two World Cups for youth and senior players alternating each year starting in 2022, with both of these international events being played in a mixed-gender format. The WBSC is also planning to, as part of its general push into E-Sports, introduce a video game version of Baseball5 in the near future.

=== Coed slow pitch softball ===
The first official WBSC Coed Slow Pitch World Cup was greenlit on 9 June 2022, during a meeting by the WBSC Executive Board in Pully, Switzerland. It was to be held in Guadalajara, Mexico in December 2023, but it was cancelled in October 2023 due to logistical challenges.

== Organizational structure ==
The WBSC is governed by the executive board, which consists of fourteen members: president, secretary general, two vice presidents, baseball executive vice president, softball executive vice president, treasurer, four members at large, athlete representative for baseball, athlete representative for softball, and global ambassador.

The Baseball Division is governed by an executive committee, which has thirteen members: president, secretary general, 2nd vice president, 3rd vice president, treasurer, three members at large, four continental vice presidents (one each for Africa, Americas, Europe, and Oceania), and executive director.

The Softball Division is governed by an executive committee that has twenty-three members: president, secretary general, 1st vice president, 2nd vice president, treasurer, twelve vice presidents (two each for Africa, Asia, Europe, Latin America, and Oceania, and one each for North America and English-speaking Caribbean), two at-large members, two athlete representatives, immediate past president, and executive director.

The WBSC has four departments: media, finance, tournaments, and marketing. It also has several commissions.

=== Members ===
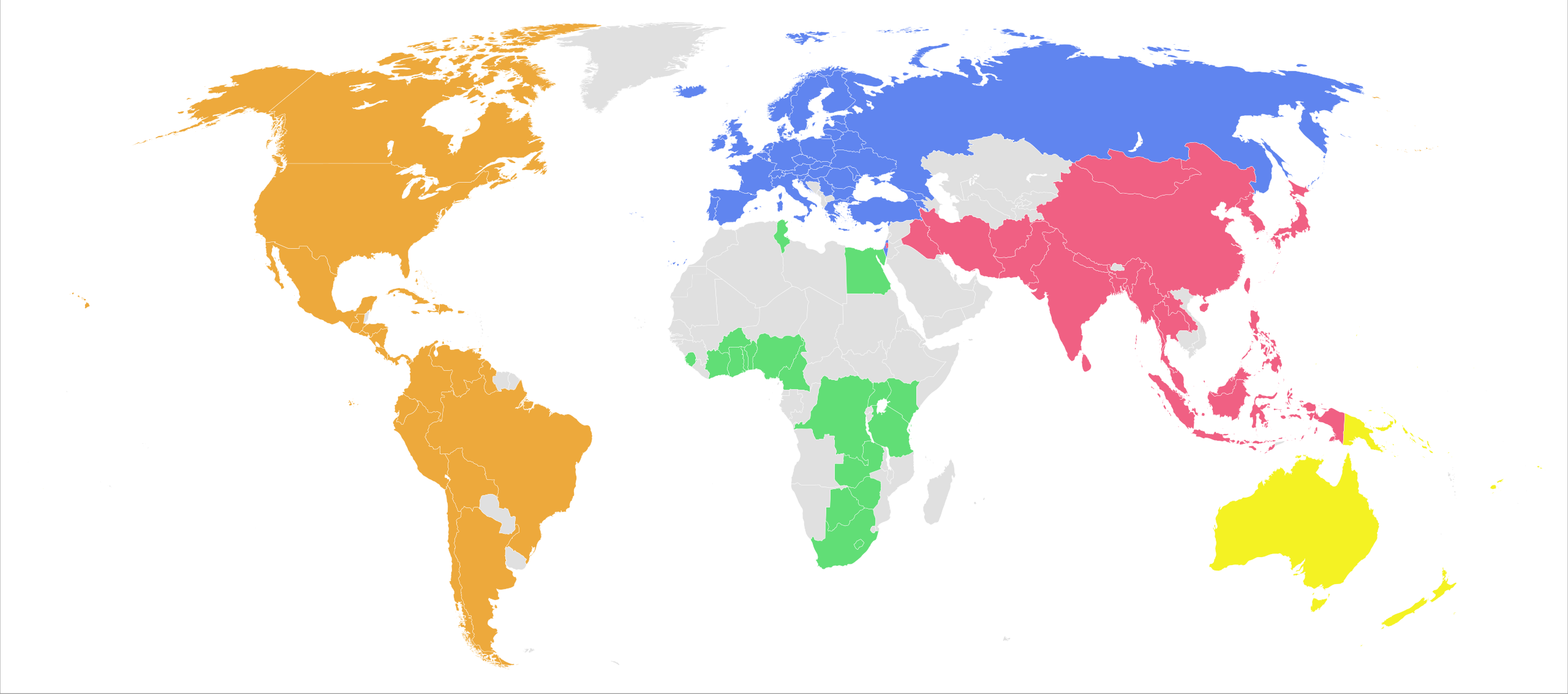
WBSC Confederations

Besides its worldwide institutions, there are five regional governing bodies that oversee the game in the different continents and regions of the world.

- WBSC Africa (28 members)
- WBSC Americas (58 members)
- WBSC Asia (34 members)
- WBSC Europe (54 members)
- WBSC Oceania (24 members)

| Team | Region | League |
|---|---|---|
| Dominican Republic | Americas | LIDOM |
| Mexico | Americas | LMB |
| Mexico | Americas | LMP |
| Puerto Rico | Americas | LBPRC |
| United States | Americas | AA |
| United States | Americas | AABC |
| United States | Americas | ABO |
| United States | Americas | BRL |
| United States | Americas | PONY |
| Venezuela | Americas | LVBP |
| Chinese Taipei | Asia | CPBL |
| Japan | Asia | NPB |
| South Korea | Asia | KBO |
| France | Europe | AFBS |
| Italy | Europe | AIBxC |

In total, WBSC recognizes 198 national associations, with 132 national baseball teams as well as 122 women's national teams.

Unlike the ICC, the WBSC identifies associate members as those who particularly endorse international baseball and softball with their own leagues in partnership with the WBSC. These leagues support baseball and softball to the extent that they are major sports in their respective countries. The table to the right has all leagues along with the country hosted:

=== Presidents ===
| No | Name | Country | Org. | Took office | Left office |
|---|---|---|---|---|---|
| 1 | Leslie Mann | United States | IBF | 1938 | 1939 |
| 2 | Jaime Mariné | Cuba | IBF | 1940 | 1943 |
| 3 | Jorge Reyes | Mexico | FIBA | 1944 | 1945 |
| 4 | Pablo Morales | Venezuela | FIBA | 1946 | 1947 |
| 5 | Chale Pereira | Nicaragua | FIBA | 1948 | 1950 |
| — | Pablo Morales | Venezuela | FIBA | 1951 | 1952 |
| 6 | Carlos Manuel Zecca | Costa Rica | FIBA | 1953 | 1968 |
| 7 | Juan Isa | Netherlands Antilles | FIBA | 1969 | 1975 |
| — | William Fehring | United States | FEMBA (Note: The status of FEMBA, which broke away from FIBA from 1973 to 1975, is disputed.) | 1973 | 1974 |
| — | Carlos García Solórzano | Nicaragua | FEMBA | 1975 | |
| 8 | Manuel González Guerra | Cuba | AINBA | 1976 | 1979 |
| — | Carlos García Solórzano (Note: Elected but did not take office due to the Nicaraguan Revolution. Robert Smith filled the role in an interim capacity.) | Nicaragua | AINBA | 1980 | 1981 |
| 9 | Robert Smith | United States | IBAF | 1981 | 1993 |
| 10 | Aldo Notari | Italy | IBAF | 1993 | 2006 |
| 11 | Harvey Schiller | United States | IBAF | 2007 | 2009 |
| 12 | Riccardo Fraccari | Italy | IBAF | 2009 | Incumbent |
| 12 | Riccardo Fraccari | Italy | WBSC | 2009 | Incumbent |

(Note: Dates according to the WBSC. Other sources, including sports researcher Stephan Müller, offer slightly different dates.)

== Tournaments ==
=== Baseball ===
Men's

- Olympic baseball tournament
- World Baseball Classic
- WBSC Premier12
- U-23 Baseball World Cup
- U-18 Baseball World Cup
- U-15 Baseball World Cup
- U-12 Baseball World Cup

Women's

- Women's Baseball World Cup

=== Softball ===
Men's

- Men's Softball World Cup
- U-23 Men's Softball World Cup
- U-18 Men's Softball World Cup

Women's

- Olympic softball tournament
- Women's Softball World Cup
- Softball at the World Games
- U-18 Women's Softball World Cup
- U-15 Women's Softball World Cup

Mixed

- U-12 Softball World Cup

=== Baseball5 ===
Mixed

- Summer Youth Olympics
- Baseball5 World Cup
- Youth Baseball5 World Cup
- Word Games

=== Reigning title holders ===
| Competition | Year | Host country / region | Champions | Title | Runners-up | Next edition | Dates |
Baseball
| World Baseball Classic | 2026 | United States | Venezuela | 1st | United States | TBD | Qualification: |
| World Baseball Classic | 2026 | United States | Venezuela | 1st | United States | TBD | Finals: |
| WBSC Premier12 | 2024 | Japan | Chinese Taipei | 1st | Japan | 2027 | |
| Olympic baseball tournament | 2020 | Japan | Japan | 1st | United States | 2028 | 13–19 July 2028 |
| U-23 Baseball World Cup | 2026 | Nicaragua | Venezuela | 2nd | Australia | 2028 | |
| U-18 Baseball World Cup | 2025 | Japan | United States | 11th | Japan | 2027 | |
| U-15 Baseball World Cup | 2026 | Mexico | United States | 8th | Dominican Republic | 2028 | |
| U-12 Baseball World Cup | 2025 | Taiwan | United States | 6th | Japan | 2027 | |
| Women's Baseball World Cup | 2024 | Canada | Japan | 7th | United States | 2027 | 2026 (group stage); 2027 (finals) |
Softball
| Men's Softball World Cup | 2025 | Canada | Venezuela | 1st | New Zealand | 2029 | 2028 (group stage); 2029 (finals) |
| U-23 Men's Softball World Cup | 2026 | Colombia | Japan | 1st | Australia | 2030 | |
| U-18 Men's Softball World Cup | 2023 | Mexico | Japan | 4th | Mexico | 2027 | |
| Women's Softball World Cup | 2024 | Italy | Japan | 4th | United States | 2027 | 2026 (group stage); 2027 (finals) |
| U-18 Women's Softball World Cup | 2025 | United States | United States | 9th | Japan | 2029 | |
| U-15 Women's Softball World Cup | 2025 | Italy | Japan | 1st | Puerto Rico | 2027 | |
| U-12 Softball World Cup | 2021 | Taiwan | Chinese Taipei | 2nd | Czech Republic | TBD | |
| Olympic softball tournament | 2020 | Japan | Japan | 2nd | United States | 2028 | 23–29 July 2028 |
Baseball 5
| Baseball5 World Cup | 2024 | Hong Kong | Cuba | 2nd | Japan | 2026 | 9–13 December 2026 |
| Youth Baseball5 World Cup | 2025 | Mexico | Cuba | 2nd | Chinese Taipei | 2027 | |
| Youth Olympic Games | 2026 | Senegal | Cuba | 1st | Chinese Taipei | 2030 | |
Club
| Baseball Champions League Americas | 2026 | Mexico | (United States) Kane County Cougars | 1st | (Mexico) Diablos Rojos del México | | |
| Baseball Champions League Europe | 2026 | Czech Republic | (Italy) Parma | 1st | (Netherlands) Neptunus | | |

== World Rankings ==
=== Men's baseball ===
Top 20 Rankings as of 26 October 2026
| Rank | Change | Team | Points |
|---|---|---|---|
| 1 | Steady | Japan | 6349 |
| 2 | Steady | Chinese Taipei | 5301 |
| 3 | Steady | United States | 4293 |
| 4 | Steady | South Korea | 4253 |
| 5 | Steady | Venezuela | 3932 |
| 6 | Steady | Mexico | 3229 |
| 7 | Steady | Puerto Rico | 3144 |
| 8 | Steady | Dominican Republic | 2737 |
| 9 | Steady | Panama | 2694 |
| 10 | Steady | Australia | 2596 |
| 11 | Steady | Netherlands | 2429 |
| 12 | Steady | Cuba | 2002 |
| 13 | ▲1 | Italy | 1897 |
| 14 | ▼1 | Colombia | 1896 |
| 15 | Steady | Nicaragua | 1657 |
| 16 | Steady | Czech Republic | 1269 |
| 17 | Steady | Germany | 1158 |
| 18 | Steady | Canada | 886 |
| 19 | Steady | China | 879 |
| 20 | Steady | Great Britain | 862 |
*Change from 10 August 2026

=== Men's softball ===
Top 20 Rankings as of 14 May 2026
| Rank | Change | Team | Points |
|---|---|---|---|
| 1 | Steady | Japan | 3128 |
| 2 | Steady | Venezuela | 2797 |
| 3 | ▲1 | Canada | 2347 |
| 4 | ▲1 | United States | 2262 |
| 5 | ▼2 | Argentina | 2146 |
| 6 | ▲2 | Mexico | 1955 |
| 7 | Steady | New Zealand | 1884 |
| 8 | ▼2 | Australia | 1828 |
| 9 | Steady | Czech Republic | 1466 |
| 10 | ▲1 | Dominican Republic | 1027 |
| 11 | ▼1 | Singapore | 980 |
| 12 | ▲1 | Colombia | 796 |
| 13 | ▼1 | Guatemala | 660 |
| 14 | ▲5 | Denmark | 486 |
| 15 | ▼1 | South Africa | 425 |
| 16 | ▼1 | Hong Kong | 371 |
| 17 | ▲5 | Panama | 308 |
| 18 | ▼1 | Philippines | 290 |
| 19 | ▼1 | Chinese Taipei | 289 |
| 20 | Steady | Netherlands | 239 |
*Change from 31 December 2025

=== Women's baseball ===
Top 20 Rankings as of 9 September 2026
| Rank | Change | Team | Points |
|---|---|---|---|
| 1 | Steady | Japan | 2075 |
| 2 | Steady | United States | 1428 |
| 3 | Steady | Canada | 1365 |
| 4 | ▲1 | Venezuela | 1248 |
| 5 | ▲1 | Chinese Taipei | 1234 |
| 6 | ▼2 | Mexico | 990 |
| 7 | ▲3 | Australia | 692 |
| 8 | ▲4 | South Korea | 689 |
| 9 | ▼1 | Hong Kong | 605 |
| 10 | ▼3 | Cuba | 535 |
| 11 | ▲10 | Philippines | 516 |
| 12 | ▼3 | Puerto Rico | 342 |
| 13 | ▼2 | Indonesia | 333 |
| 14 | ▼1 | India | 301 |
| 15 | Steady | Great Britain | 260 |
| 16 | ▲3 | China | 247 |
| 17 | ▼1 | Thailand | 214 |
| 18 | ▼1 | Pakistan | 207 |
| 19 | ▼5 | France | 164 |
| 20 | Steady | Sri Lanka | 141 |
*Change from 31 December 2025

=== Women's softball ===
Top 20 Rankings as of 31 December 2025
| Rank | Change | Team | Points |
|---|---|---|---|
| 1 | Steady | Japan | 3649 |
| 2 | Steady | United States | 3490 |
| 3 | Steady | Puerto Rico | 3010 |
| 4 | Steady | Canada | 2667 |
| 5 | ▲1 | Chinese Taipei | 2276 |
| 6 | ▼1 | Netherlands | 1988 |
| 7 | ▲1 | Mexico | 1825 |
| 8 | ▼1 | China | 1686 |
| 9 | ▲1 | Italy | 1542 |
| 10 | ▲1 | Czech Republic | 1520 |
| 11 | ▼1 | Australia | 1380 |
| 12 | Steady | Great Britain | 1053 |
| 13 | ▲3 | Philippines | 993 |
| 14 | ▼1 | Cuba | 906 |
| 15 | ▼1 | Spain | 860 |
| 16 | ▼1 | Venezuela | 777 |
| 17 | Steady | Brazil | 602 |
| 18 | Steady | Peru | 554 |
| 19 | ▲1 | Germany | 464 |
| 20 | ▲1 | Israel | 451 |
*Change from 9 October 2025

=== Baseball5 (Coed) ===
Top 20 Rankings as of 7 August 2026
| Rank | Change | Team | Points |
|---|---|---|---|
| 1 | Steady | Cuba | 5827 |
| 2 | Steady | Chinese Taipei | 4801 |
| 3 | ▲1 | France | 4636 |
| 4 | ▼1 | Japan | 4385 |
| 5 | ▲1 | Mexico | 3843 |
| 6 | Steady | Tunisia | 3790 |
| 7 | Steady | Venezuela | 3324 |
| 8 | ▲1 | Turkey | 3130 |
| 9 | ▼1 | Lithuania | 2863 |
| 10 | Steady | Kenya | 2430 |
| 11 | ▲1 | Spain | 2135 |
| 12 | ▼1 | South Korea | 2127 |
| 13 | Steady | South Africa | 1621 |
| 14 | Steady | Italy | 1472 |
| 15 | Steady | Hong Kong | 1316 |
| 16 | Steady | Thailand | 1205 |
| 17 | Steady | Netherlands | 1130 |
| 18 | Steady | Romania | 1123 |
| 19 | Steady | China | 1120 |
| 20 | Steady | Ghana | 1055 |
*Change from 6 May 2026

== See also ==
- Baseball awards § International
- Softball at the Summer Olympics
- Baseball at the Summer Olympics
- Major achievements in baseball and softball by nation
