= 2025 Baseball5 African Championship =

Tournament details
- Country: Zambia
- Dates: 5–8 November
- Teams: 6

Final positions
- Champions: Tunisia (2nd title)
- Runners-up: South Africa
- Third place: Kenya
- Fourth place: Cape Verde

Tournament statistics
- Games played: 20

The 2025 Baseball5 African Championship was the third edition of the Baseball5 African Championship, a Baseball5 tournament organized by WBSC Africa. The championship was held from 5 to 8 November 2025, in the OYDC Zambia Sports Development Centre in Lusaka, Zambia and was contested between six national teams.

Tunisia won the tournament, defeating South Africa in the final game 2 sets to 0. The Tunisian retaining the African title they had first secured last year in Cape Verde.

== Venue ==
(Zambia) Lusaka
OYDC Zambia Sports Development Centre

== Opening round ==
Pos	Team	Pld	W	L	PCT	GB	Qualification
1	Tunisia	5	5	0	1.000	—	Advance to Knockout stage
2	South Africa	5	4	1	.800	1	Advance to Knockout stage
3	Cape Verde	5	3	2	.600	2	Advance to Knockout stage
4	Kenya	5	2	3	.400	3	Advance to Knockout stage
5	Zambia	5	1	4	.200	4	
6	Burkina Faso	5	0	5	.000	5	

Source: WBSC Africa

Date	Time		Score		Set 1	Set 2	Set 3	Total	Report
5 Nov	12:30	Burkina Faso	0-2	Zambia	4-5	2-6		6-11	
5 Nov	14:00	Cape Verde	0-2	Tunisia	1-7	4-6		5-13	
5 Nov	15:30	South Africa	2-1	Kenya	6-5	6-9	5-10	17-24	
6 Nov	8:30	Kenya	1-2	Cape Verde	14-0	3-11	9-10	26-21	
6 Nov	10:30	Zambia	0-2	South Africa	6-7	6-7		12-14	
6 Nov	12:30	Kenya	0-2	Tunisia	6-7	4-6		10-13	
6 Nov	14:00	Burkina Faso	1-2	Cape Verde	5-3	2-3	3-5	10-11	
6 Nov	15:30	Tunisia	2-0	Zambia	6-5	6-5		12-10	
6 Nov	17:00	South Africa	2-0	Burkina Faso	10-9	5-3		15-12	
7 Nov	9:30	Zambia	0-2	Kenya	17-18	8-9		25-27	
7 Nov	11:00	Cape Verde	1-2	South Africa	9-4	0-1	6-8	15-13	
7 Nov	12:30	Kenya	2-0	Burkina Faso	16-1	16-0		32-1	
7 Nov	14:00	South Africa	0-2	Tunisia	3-8	4-7		7-15	
7 Nov	15:30	Cape Verde	2-1	Zambia	6-7	7-4	12-9	25-20	
7 Nov		Tunisia	2-0	Burkina Faso	14-6	11-0		25-6	

== Knockout stage ==
Semifinals
Cape Verde	1
South Africa	2
Kenya	1
Tunisia	2

Final
South Africa	0
Tunisia	2
3rd place
Cape Verde	1
Kenya	2

=== 5th place match ===
Date	Time		Score		Set 1	Set 2	Set 3	Total	Report
8 Nov	9:30	Burkina Faso	0-2	Zambia	0-8	2-13		2-21	

=== Semifinals ===
Date	Time		Score		Set 1	Set 2	Set 3	Total	Report
8 Nov	11:00	Kenya	1-2	Tunisia	2-6	15-5	3-5	20-16	
8 Nov	12:30	Cape Verde	1-2	South Africa	6-5	8-7	5-10	19-22	

=== 3rd place match ===
Date	Time		Score		Set 1	Set 2	Set 3	Total	Report
8 Nov	14:00	Cape Verde	1-2	Kenya	6-5	1-3	5-10	12-18	

=== Final ===
Date	Time		Score		Set 1	Set 2	Set 3	Total	Report
8 Nov	15:30	South Africa	0-2	Tunisia	3-7	4-6		7-13	

== Final standings ==
Pos	Team	W	L	Qualification
Gold medal	Tunisia	7	0	Qualified for 2026 Baseball5 World Cup
Silver medal	South Africa	5	2	Qualified for 2026 Baseball5 World Cup
Bronze medal	Kenya	4	3	
4	Cape Verde	2	5	
5	Zambia	2	4	
6	Burkina Faso	0	6	
