= Carlos Pereira =

Carlos Pereira may refer to:

== Businessmen ==
- Chale Pereira, born Carlos Pereira Ocampo, Nicaraguan baseball executive and president of the International Baseball Federation

== Sportspeople ==
- Carlos Pereira (footballer, born 1910), Portuguese football midfielder
- Carlos Pereira (footballer, born 1951), Spanish football goalkeeper
- Carlos Pereira (footballer, born 1962), Portuguese football right back
- Carlos Pereira (footballer, born 1996), Paraguayan football right midfielder
- Carlos Roberto Pereira (born 1946), Brazilian football manager
- Carlinhos (footballer, born November 1986), born Carlos Emiliano Pereira, Brazilian football left back
