= Dutch Fehring =

American sportsman (1912–2006)

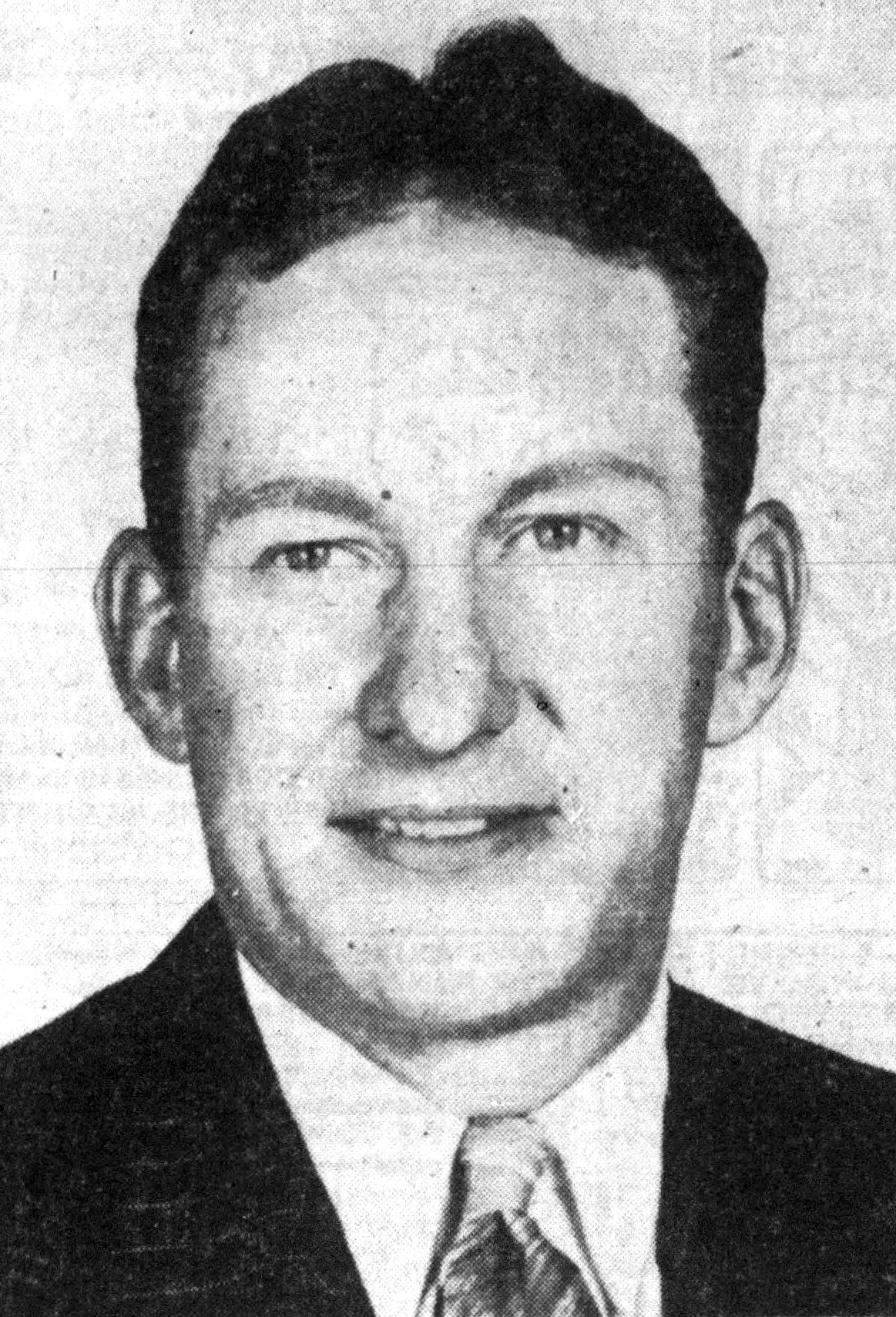
- Fehring, circa 1948

President of FEMBA
- In office September 8, 1973 – August 31, 1975
- Preceded by: Juan Isa (as president of FIBA)
- Succeeded by: Carlos García Solórzano

President of the U.S. Baseball Federation
- In office April 6, 1966 – January 1978
- Preceded by: Eppie Barnes

Personal details
- Born: May 31, 1912 Columbus, Indiana, U.S.
- Died: April 13, 2006 (aged 93) Palo Alto, California, U.S.
- Education: Purdue University
- Coaching career

Playing career

Football
- 1931–1933: Purdue

Basketball
- 1931–1934: Purdue

Baseball
- 1932–1934: Purdue
- Positions: Tackle (football); Catcher (baseball)

Coaching career (HC unless noted)

Football
- 1935–1942: Purdue (assistant)
- 1947: Oklahoma (assistant)
- 1948: UCLA (assistant)
- 1949–1967: Stanford (assistant)

Baseball
- 1936–1942: Purdue
- 1949–1955: Stanford (assistant)
- 1956–1967: Stanford

Head coaching record
- Overall: 374–248–9

Accomplishments and honors

Awards
- First-team All-Big Ten (1933); Second-team All-Big Ten (1932)

Baseball career
- Catcher
- Batted: Both Threw: Right

MLB debut
- June 25, 1934, for the Chicago White Sox

Last MLB appearance
- June 25, 1934, for the Chicago White Sox

MLB statistics
- Batting average: .000 (0-for-1)
- Games played: 1
- Stats at Baseball Reference

Teams
- Chicago White Sox (1934)

William Paul "Dutch" Fehring (May 31, 1912 – April 13, 2006) was an American football and baseball player, coach, and administrator. Fehring was president of the United States Baseball Federation, and oversaw the return of the U.S. national team to international baseball competition. He also briefly led the World Amateur Baseball Federation, better known as FEMBA, (Note: Spanish: Federación Mundial de Béisbol Amateur) during its split from the International Baseball Federation (FIBA) in the early 1970s.

A longtime college baseball coach, he served as the head baseball coach at Purdue University from 1936 to 1942 and at Stanford University from 1956 to 1967, compiling a career record of 374–248–9. He was a cup of coffee player with the Chicago White Sox of Major League Baseball, appearing in a single game during the 1934 season.

== Early life ==
Born in Columbus, Indiana, Fehring attended Purdue University, where he starred in football, basketball, and baseball, one of only two Purdue athletes to letter nine times. Fehring helped the Boilermakers win two Big Ten Conference titles in football and a retroactive Helms national championship in basketball in 1932, and was the traveling roommate of John Wooden. Fehring was inducted into the inaugural class of the Purdue University Athletic Hall of Fame in 1994.

== Baseball career ==
After graduating from Purdue, Fehring chose to play his favorite sport, baseball, where he excelled as a catcher. He was signed by the Chicago White Sox and made a single major league appearance, in a road game against the New York Yankees at Yankee Stadium on June 25, 1934. Fehring entered the game in the bottom of the seventh inning to catch, with the Yankees leading 10–2. During that inning, Lou Gehrig attempted an inside-the-park home run on a ball hit to center field; the ball was relayed to Fehring, who tagged Gehrig out at the plate. Gehrig was credited with a triple on the play; he had already hit a home run, single, and double in the game, thus it became the first time that Gehrig hit for the cycle in his career. Fehring had one at bat during the game, striking out in the ninth inning.

== Coaching career ==
After his baseball career ended, Fehring returned to Purdue and became their head baseball coach and assistant football coach from 1936 to 1942. After serving in World War II, Fehring was an assistant football coach for two years at Oklahoma and for one year at UCLA, where he recommended his college friend John Wooden for the head basketball coaching vacancy.

=== Stanford ===
In 1949, Fehring was hired as an assistant baseball and football coach at Stanford. He took over as head baseball coach in 1956, and coached for 11 years, culminating in a College World Series semifinals appearance in 1967. Along with his football coaching role in the 1952 Rose Bowl, Fehring has the unique distinction as a coach in both a College World Series and a Rose Bowl.

== International baseball ==
=== U.S. national team ===
Fehring was an assistant coach on the United States national baseball team that participated in the 1964 Olympic Games in Tokyo, under manager and USC coach Rod Dedeaux. On the 1964 Olympic team was catcher Jim Hibbs, who played under Fehring at Stanford.

Fehring was named president of the United States Baseball Federation (USBF) on April 6, 1966, replacing Eppie Barnes. As president, Fehring saw the United States national team return to international stage; its appearance at the 1969 Amateur World Series in the Dominican Republic was the first time the U.S. participated in the tournament since 1942.

=== FEMBA ===
Fehring was highly critical of the International Baseball Federation (FIBA) and its president, Juan Isa. He, like many others, believed that the Caribbean baseball federations had too much control over FIBA's proceedings. "If FIBA is an international federation," he said, "the leadership positions must belong to different countries."

After the 1973 FIBA Congress ended in confusion and chaos, Italy and Nicaragua withdrew from FIBA to organize their own international federation; the USBF soon followed, along with 24 other national federations. Fehring was elected president of the new organization, titled FEMBA (or alternatively, WABAF) on September 8, 1973.

As head of FEMBA, a major priority for Fehring was the inclusion of baseball at the Summer Olympics. This had been a factor in the FEMBA split, as critics of FIBA felt that the federation was too chaotic to pursue Olympic status. Fehring, with the backing of MLB Commissioner Bowie Kuhn, met with International Olympic Committee head Lord Killanin, but was told that would not occur as long as baseball was represented by two different organizations.

Fehring was succeeded as FEMBA president by Carlos García Solórzano in 1975. After the FEMBA-FIBA split was resolved in 1976, he joined the unified committee of AINBA, later the IBAF (the predecessor to the modern World Baseball Softball Confederation). Under IBAF president Robert Smith, Fehring recruited Rod Dedeaux to help the federation gain Olympic status; thanks to Dedeaux and Los Angeles Dodgers owner Peter O'Malley, baseball returned to the Olympics at the 1984 Los Angeles Games.

== Later life and honors ==
Fehring retired as head baseball coach in 1967, but remained at Stanford as director of intramurals and club sports until 1977. He also stepped down as president of the U.S. Baseball Federation in January 1978. Fehring died in Palo Alto, California, in 2006 at the age of 93.

Fehring is an inductee of the American Baseball Coaches Association Hall of Fame, the Indiana Baseball Hall of Fame, the Indiana Basketball Hall of Fame, the Purdue University Athletic Hall of Fame, and the Stanford Athletic Hall of Fame.

== Head coaching record ==
Record table
Season	Team	Overall	Conference	Standing	Postseason
Purdue Boilermakers (Big Ten Conference) (1936–1942)
1936	Purdue	6–21	1–10	T–8th	
1937	Purdue	12–14	2–9	10th	
1938	Purdue	14–10	6–5	T–3rd	
1939	Purdue	12–8	5–5	6th	
1940	Purdue	14–9	2–7	9th	
1941	Purdue	15–10–1	4–8	9th	
1942	Purdue	11–14	5–7	T–5th	
Purdue:		84–86–5 (.494)	25–51 (.329)		
Stanford Indians (Pacific Coast Conference) (1956–1959)
1956	Stanford	24–10–1	9–7	3rd (CIBA)	
1957	Stanford	17–13	7–9	3rd (CIBA)	
1958	Stanford	23–12	7–9	3rd (CIBA)	
1959	Stanford	21–13	9–7	3rd (CIBA)	
Stanford Indians (Athletic Association of Western Universities) (1960–1967)
1960	Stanford	20–17	6–10	T–3rd (CIBA)	
1961	Stanford	26–17	5–11	T–4th (CIBA)	
1962	Stanford	21–14	6–10	4th (CIBA)	
1963	Stanford	24–11	8–8	4th (CIBA)	
1964	Stanford	20–24	4–16	6th (CIBA)	
1965	Stanford	32–13	11–9	1st (CIBA)	
1966	Stanford	26–12–2	12–8	T–2nd (CIBA)	
1967	Stanford	36–6–1	10–1	1st	College World Series
Stanford:		290–162–4 (.640)	94–105 (.472)		
Total:		374–248–9 (.600)			
National champion Postseason invitational champion Conference regular season champion Conference regular season and conference tournament champion Division regular season champion Division regular season and conference tournament champion Conference tournament champion
