= Manuel González Guerra =

Cuban baseball executive (1914–1997)

President of AINBA
- In office January 4, 1976 – September 5, 1980
- Preceded by: Juan Isa (as president of FIBA); Carlos García Solórzano (as president of FEMBA)
- Succeeded by: Robert E. Smith (Note: Carlos García Solórzano was elected in 1980, but did not take office due to the Nicaraguan Revolution)

President of the Cuban Olympic Committee
- In office 1963–1997

Personal details
- Born: April 25, 1914 Havana, Cuba
- Died: April 18, 1997 (aged 82) Havana, Cuba
- Occupation: Baseball administrator

Manuel Ricardo González Guerra (April 25, 1914 – April 18, 1997) was a Cuban baseball executive and president of the International Baseball Federation (then known as the Asociación Internacional de Béisbol Amateur, or AINBA) from 1976 to 1980. He was the first president of the organization elected after the splinter group FEMBA rejoined in 1976.

González, a boxer and amateur baseball player in his youth, was president of the Cuban amateur baseball league from 1950 to 1961. After the Cuban Revolution, he established the Cuban Baseball Federation as part of the INDER, the new sports ministry.

González was also president of the Cuban Olympic Committee. His election to the AINBA presidency in 1976 was partly due to his ties with the International Olympic Committee (IOC), as AINBA sought to gain recognition for baseball as an Olympic sport. He was considered a close friend of Juan Antonio Samaranch, who became IOC president in 1980. After his tenure as AINBA president ended, González was present at the IOC meeting on 13 October 1986 where baseball was voted into the Olympic programme, starting at the 1992 Olympics in Barcelona.

González was arrested several times for his opposition to the dictatorships of Gerardo Machado and Fulgencio Batista; he joined Fidel Castro's 26th of July Movement in 1957. As head of the Castro-era Cuban Olympic Committee, he was a staunch critic of the United States, leading Cuba's boycott of the 1984 Summer Olympics in Los Angeles (despite the landmark inclusion of baseball as a demonstration sport) and alleging that the 1987 Pan American Games were awarded to Indianapolis over Havana due to pressure from the American State Department. Earlier, at the 1972 FIBA Congress, Guerra had challenged the inclusion of the United States and West Germany national teams in the Amateur World Series, arguing that they should not be included because they were not recognized by their country's Olympic committees; this episode precipitated the breakaway of the U.S., Italy, and other federations from FIBA, which would not be resolved until 1976.

However, Guerra also described American baseball owner Peter O'Malley as "his friend."

His son, also Manuel González, was an Olympic fencer at the 1968 Summer Olympics in Mexico City.

== Bibliography ==
- Riccardo Schiroli (2019). The Game We Love (PDF). World Baseball Softball Confederation.
- Miguel Angel Masjuan; Juan de las Cuevas (2007). Personalidades del Deporte Cubano (in Spanish). Editorial Científico Técnica. p. 167. ISBN 978-959-05-0476-1.

Preceded by Juan Isa	President of the International Baseball Federation; 1976 to 1980	Succeeded by Carlos García Solórzano (did not take office)
