= Riccardo Fraccari =

Baseball umpire, Olympic Games official

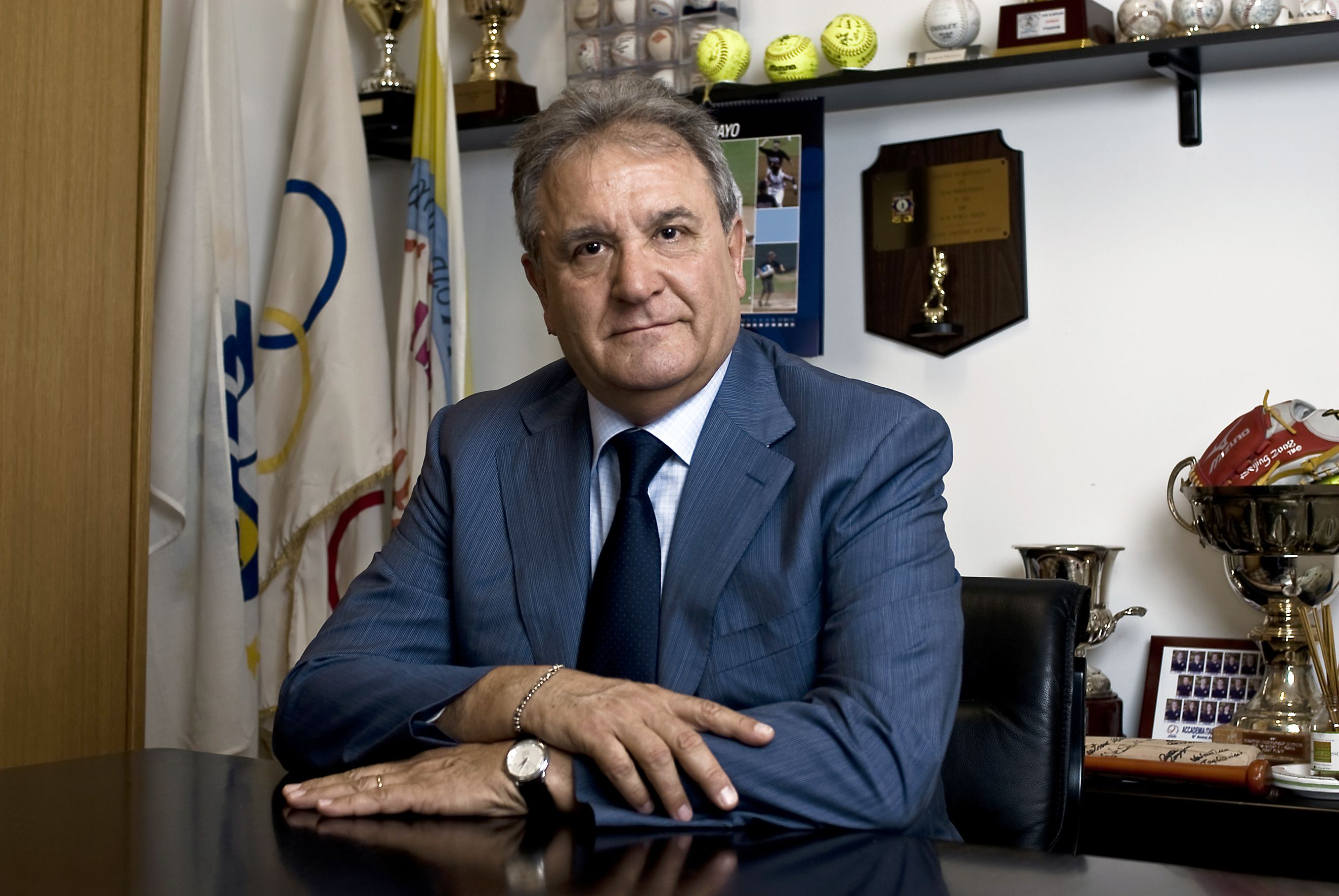

President of the WBSC
- Incumbent
- Assumed office 10 May 2014

President of the IBAF
- In office 6 December 2009 – 10 May 2014
- Preceded by: Harvey Schiller
- Succeeded by: Himself (as president of the WBSC)

Personal details
- Born: May 30, 1949 (age 76) Pisa, Italy

Riccardo Fraccari (born 30 May 1949 in Pisa, Italy) is an international sports administrator who is the current president of the World Baseball Softball Confederation (WBSC). He was previously president of the International Baseball Federation (IBAF) from 2009 to 2013.

Fraccari was elected as president of the IBAF in December 2009, succeeding American Harvey Schiller, and immediately set out to hold merger discussions with the International Softball Federation. He spearheaded negotiations to consolidate international baseball and softball to establish and successfully launch the WBSC in October 2012, uniting baseball and softball's global movements and streamlining the two sports' efforts to return to the Olympic Games. He was elected the first president of the WBSC in May 2014, and was re-elected in July 2022 to serve a second seven-year term.

== WBSC presidency ==
In less than three years since overseeing the establishment of the WBSC, Fraccari has elevated the new world ruling body to be considered among the Top 30 "Ultimate Sports Federations" in the world.

Fraccari has expanded international baseball properties to include a new flagship world tournament, the WBSC Premier 12 Professional Baseball National Team Championship, and also the Under-12 Baseball World Cup and the Under-21 Baseball World Cup, which impact baseball's World Rankings.

Fraccari and the WBSC were able to secure the return of baseball and softball as Olympic sports in August 2016, when the International Olympic Committee voted to reinstate them for the 2020 Tokyo Games.

Under Fraccari, the world governing body for baseball also established the first-ever "Europe" team to compete in officially recognized international competitions, setting a historical precedent.

In May 2018, the WBSC under Fraccari established Baseball5, a new street/urban baseball discipline that only requires a ball.

=== Controversies ===
In February 2015, Fraccari appointed Antonio Castro, the son of former Cuban leader Fidel Castro, as WBSC Global Ambassador and Kenyon & Kenyon Washington D.C.–based attorney Edward Colbert, brother of American political satirist Stephen Colbert, as WBSC General Counsel.

Fraccari has said that FEPCUBE, an organization representing defected Cuban ballplayers, is ineligible to play in WBSC-sponsored events, as it is not recognized by the Baseball Federation of Cuba. "If they want to be part of an event sanctioned by the WBSC, they have to respect the rules, which are that the national federations make the national teams."

== Other activities ==
Fraccari is a retired professor of organic chemistry at the Livorno Technical Institute (Istituto Tecnico Industriale "Galileo Galilei") and also studied law at the University of Pisa.

Fraccari is an advisory board member of the global sports think tank, Doha GOALS. He also serves as the current chairman of the Italian National Olympic Committee's (CONI) International Relations Exploratory Committee and is a member of the CONI Council. He was appointed a member of CONI's highest authoritative body, the Executive Board ("Giunta"), in August 2018.

In May 2013, Fraccari was elected as the Secretary General of the Association of IOC Recognised International Sports Federations.

In April 2018, Bulgaria's National Sports Academy of Sofia named Fraccari an Honorary Professor.

== Personal life ==
Fraccari is married to a Swiss national; the couple have one son who graduated in law from LUISS "Guido Carli" University in Rome. Fraccari splits his residence between Livorno and Rome, Italy. He is fluent in English, French, Italian and Spanish.

== Honours and decorations ==
- Italy: Knight of Merit of the Italian Republic
- Italy: Italian National Olympic Committee "Gold Star of Sport Merit"
- Bulgaria: Honorary Professor, Bulgaria National Sports Academy
- Bulgaria: Title Honoris Causa of Bulgaria
