= Oscar Prieto Ortiz =

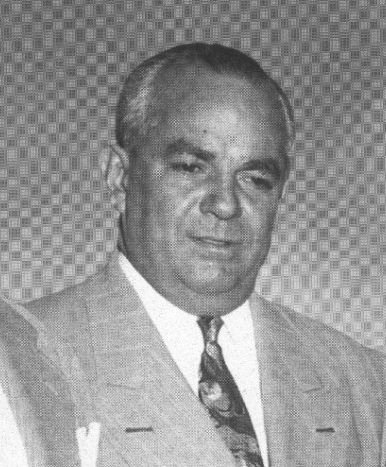
- Born: Oscar Prieto Ortiz; August 1, 1905; Ciudad Bolívar, Bolívar, Venezuela
- Died: August 10, 1983 (aged 78); Caracas, Venezuela
- Occupations: Baseball executive and promoter
- Organizations: Caribbean Series; Leones del Caracas; Venezuelan Professional Baseball League
- Baseball career

Member of the Venezuelan

Baseball Hall of Fame
- Induction: 2008

Oscar Prieto Ortiz (1905–1983) was a Venezuelan baseball executive and promoter.

== Biography ==
Born in Ciudad Bolívar, Prieto grew up in Caracas and attended public schools, where he learned and developed his skills as a salesperson to advertise and sell products. Over time, he became a visionary entrepreneur and helped lay the groundwork for the expansion of baseball in Venezuela and its consolidation through the Venezuelan Professional Baseball League in 1946.

At an early age, baseball was a central part of Prieto's life. He worked as a promoter for the Cardenales la Guaira BBC and then became part of the leadership of the Sabios de Vargas, clubs that participated in the Liga Nacional de Béisbol, which had stabilized the first national championship of first division in Venezuela since its inauguration in 1930. Additionally, Prieto broadcast baseball games on radio and worked closely with Pablo Morales, a businessman and baseball team owner, managing operations in regards to team events and planning budgets.

Afterwards, Morales served as president of the International Baseball Federation in a span of four years between 1946 and 1952 and also headed the organizing committee of the VII Amateur Baseball World Series held in Caracas in 1944. As a result, the first ever Caribbean Series tournament played in 1949 was the brainchild of Morales and Prieto, who devised the idea after seeing the success of the Serie Interamericana organized by them in 1946. Morales later bought the Cervecería Caracas BBC franchise in 1952 and renamed it as the Leones del Caracas, one of the most popular teams in Venezuelan professional baseball history. Morales would remain the sole owner of the team until shortly before his death in 1969, when he included Prieto as legal partner.

Oscar Prieto died in Caracas in 1983 at the age of 78 years. He was enshrined into the Venezuelan Baseball Hall of Fame and Museum in 2008.
