= Instituto Nacional de Deportes, Educación Fisica y Recreación =

National sports body in Cuba

Instituto Nacional de Deportes, Educación Física y Recreación
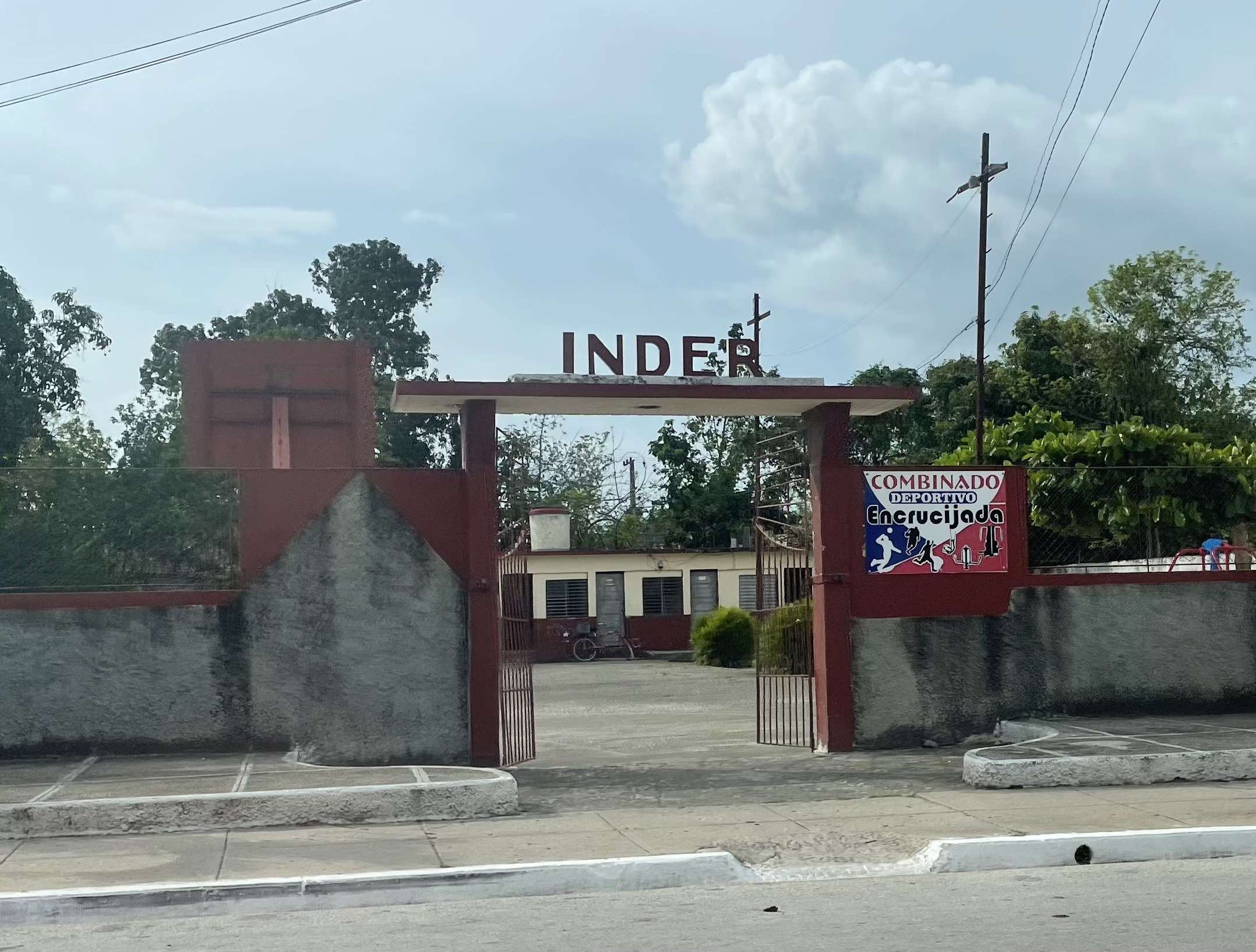
- Jurisdiction: National
- Abbreviation: (INDER)
- Founded: February 23, 1961
- Headquarters: Coliseo de la Ciudad Deportiva
- Location: Havana, Cuba
- Replaced: Dirección Nacional de Deportes

Official website
- www.inder.gob.cu//
- (Cuba)

Instituto Nacional de Deportes, Educación Física y Recreación (National Institute of Sports, Physical Education and Recreation), or INDER, is the body responsible for sports development, physical education and recreation in Cuba.

The first sports ministry in Cuba was founded after Fulgencio Batista came to power in the 1930s. Batista appointed his aide-de-camp, Colonel Jaime Mariné, to head the Dirección General Nacional de Deportes (DGND), or the National Sports Directory.

In its current form, INDER was founded after the Cuban Revolution in February 23, 1961, under Law 936, and was headed by Manuel González Guerra. The national headquarters is located in the Coliseo de la Ciudad Deportiva in Havana.

In March 1962, a new institution demanded a Resolution that forbids any professional sports to be practiced on the Island, with the aim of promoting healthy practice and preventing mercantile system in sport.
