= Zecca =

Zecca, Italian for "mint", may refer to:

== People ==
- Adriano Zecca (1923–1983). Italian professional football player and coach
- Alfredo Zecca (1949–2022), prelate of the Roman Catholic Church, former archbishop of Tucumán
- Carlos Manuel Zecca (1922–2008), Costa Rican president of the International Baseball Federation (FIBA)
- Ferdinand Zecca (1864-1947), French film director

== Other ==
- Papal mint, located in Vatican City
- Istituto Poligrafico e Zecca dello Stato, the mint of the Italian Republic
- Zecca of Venice

== See also ==
- List of mints
