= 2022 Baseball5 African Championship =

Tournament details
- Country: Tanzania
- Dates: 23–26 May
- Teams: 10

Final positions
- Champions: South Africa (1st title)
- Runners-up: Kenya
- Third place: Tunisia
- Fourth place: Uganda

The 2022 Baseball5 African Championship was the first edition of the Baseball5 African Championship, a Baseball5 tournament organized by WBSC Africa. The championship was held from 23 to 26 May 2022, in the Tanzania National Indoor Stadium in Dar es Salaam, Tanzania and was contested between ten national teams.

South Africa won the tournament, defeating Kenya in the final 2 matches to 0. Tunisia finished third beating Uganda 2 matches to 0 in the bronze medal game.

South Africa and Kenya automatically qualified to the 2022 Baseball5 World Cup held in Mexico City, while Tunisia was given a wild card spot in the world tournament by the World Baseball Softball Confederation.

== Round robin ==
=== Group A ===
Pos	Team	Pld	W	L	PCT	GB	Qualification
1	South Africa	4	4	0	1.000	—	Advance to Knockout stage
2	Uganda	4	3	1	.750	1	Advance to Knockout stage
3	Tunisia	4	2	2	.500	2	Advance to Knockout stage
4	Ghana	4	1	3	.250	3	Advance to Knockout stage
5	Zimbabwe	4	0	4	.000	4	

Source: WBSC Africa

=== Group B ===
Pos	Team	Pld	W	L	PCT	GB	Qualification
1	Kenya	4	4	0	1.000	—	Advance to Knockout stage
2	Tanzania (H)	4	3	1	.750	1	Advance to Knockout stage
3	Zambia	4	2	2	.500	2	Advance to Knockout stage
4	Burkina Faso	4	1	3	.250	3	Advance to Knockout stage
5	Egypt	4	0	4	.000	4	

Source: WBSC Africa
(H) Hosts

== Knockout stage ==
Quarter finals
Burkina Faso	0
South Africa	2
Tunisia	2
Tanzania	1
Ghana	0
Kenya	2
Zambia	0
Uganda	2

Semifinals
South Africa	2
Tunisia	1
Kenya	2
Uganda	0

Final
South Africa	2
Kenya	0
Bronze medal game
Uganda	0
Tunisia	2

== Final standings ==
Pos	Team	W	L	Qualification
Gold medal	South Africa	7	0	Qualified for 2022 Baseball5 World Cup
Silver medal	Kenya	6	1	Qualified for 2022 Baseball5 World Cup
Bronze medal	Tunisia	4	3	Qualified for 2022 Baseball5 World Cup
4	Uganda	4	3	
5	Tanzania	3	2	
6	Zambia	2	3	
7	Ghana	1	4	
8	Burkina Faso	1	4	
9	Zimbabwe	1	4	
10	Egypt	0	5	
