= Major achievements in baseball and softball by nation =

This article contains lists of achievements in major senior-level international baseball, softball and Baseball5 tournaments according to first-place, second-place and third-place results obtained by teams representing different nations. The objective is not to create combined medal tables; the focus is on listing the best positions achieved by teams in major international tournaments, ranking the nations according to the most number of podiums accomplished by teams of these nations.

== Results ==
For the making of these lists, results from following major international tournaments were consulted:

Form	Governing body	Tournament	Edition		
Form	Governing body	Tournament	First	Latest	Next
Baseball	WBSC (formerly IBAF) & IOC	Men's Baseball at the Summer Olympics (quadrennially (Note: Baseball and softball were removed from the program for the 2012 and 2016 Summer Olympics, but were added for the 2020 Summer Olympics.))	1992	2020	2028
Baseball	WBSC (formerly IBAF)	Men's World Baseball Classic (quadrennially)	2006	2026	2030
Baseball	WBSC (formerly IBAF)	Men's WBSC Premier12 (quadrennially)	2015	2024	2027
Baseball	WBSC (formerly IBAF)	Men's Baseball World Cup (biennially)	1938	2011	Defunct
Baseball	WBSC (formerly IBAF)	Women's Baseball World Cup (biennially)	2004	2024	2027
Softball	WBSC (formerly ISF) & IOC	Women's Softball at the Summer Olympics (quadrennially)	1996	2020	2028
Softball	WBSC (formerly ISF)	Men's Softball World Championship (biennially)	1966	2025	2028
Softball	WBSC (formerly ISF)	Women's Softball World Championship (biennially)	1965	2024	2027
Baseball5	WBSC	Baseball5 World Cup (biennially)	2022	2024	2026

- IBAF: International Baseball Federation
- IOC: International Olympic Committee
- ISF: International Softball Federation
- WBSC: World Baseball Softball Confederation

Medals for the demonstration events are NOT counted. Medals earned by athletes from defunct National Olympic Committees (NOCs) or historical teams are NOT merged with the results achieved by their immediate successor states. The International Olympic Committee (IOC) do NOT combine medals of these nations or teams.

The tables are pre-sorted by total number of first-place results, second-place results and third-place results, then most first-place results, second-place results, respectively. When equal ranks are given, nations are listed in alphabetical order.

=== Baseball, softball and Baseball5 ===
Last updated after the 2026 World Baseball Classic (As of 17 March 2026)
		Baseball					Softball			Baseball5	Number of			
		Olympic Games	World Baseball Classic	Premier12	World Cup		Olympic Games	World Championship		World Cup	Number of			
Rk.	Nation	Men	Men	Men	Men	Women	Women	Men	Women	Mixed	1st place, gold medalist(s)	2nd place, silver medalist(s)	3rd place, bronze medalist(s)	Total
1	Japan	1st place, gold medalist(s)	1st place, gold medalist(s)	1st place, gold medalist(s)	2nd place, silver medalist(s)	1st place, gold medalist(s)	1st place, gold medalist(s)	2nd place, silver medalist(s)	1st place, gold medalist(s)	2nd place, silver medalist(s)	6	3	0	9
2	United States	1st place, gold medalist(s)	1st place, gold medalist(s)	2nd place, silver medalist(s)	1st place, gold medalist(s)	1st place, gold medalist(s)	1st place, gold medalist(s)	1st place, gold medalist(s)	1st place, gold medalist(s)		7	1	0	8
3	Chinese Taipei	2nd place, silver medalist(s)		1st place, gold medalist(s)	2nd place, silver medalist(s)	2nd place, silver medalist(s)			2nd place, silver medalist(s)	3rd place, bronze medalist(s)	1	4	1	6
4	Australia	2nd place, silver medalist(s)				2nd place, silver medalist(s)	2nd place, silver medalist(s)	1st place, gold medalist(s)	1st place, gold medalist(s)		2	3	0	5
5	Canada				3rd place, bronze medalist(s)	2nd place, silver medalist(s)	3rd place, bronze medalist(s)	1st place, gold medalist(s)	2nd place, silver medalist(s)		1	2	2	5
6	Cuba	1st place, gold medalist(s)	2nd place, silver medalist(s)		1st place, gold medalist(s)					1st place, gold medalist(s)	3	1	0	4
6	South Korea	1st place, gold medalist(s)	2nd place, silver medalist(s)	1st place, gold medalist(s)	1st place, gold medalist(s)						3	1	0	4
8	Venezuela		1st place, gold medalist(s)		1st place, gold medalist(s)	3rd place, bronze medalist(s)		1st place, gold medalist(s)			3	0	1	4
9	Mexico		3rd place, bronze medalist(s)	3rd place, bronze medalist(s)	2nd place, silver medalist(s)			2nd place, silver medalist(s)			0	2	2	4
10	Dominican Republic	3rd place, bronze medalist(s)	1st place, gold medalist(s)		1st place, gold medalist(s)						2	0	1	3
11	New Zealand							1st place, gold medalist(s)	1st place, gold medalist(s)		2	0	0	2
12	Puerto Rico		2nd place, silver medalist(s)		1st place, gold medalist(s)						1	1	0	2
13	China						2nd place, silver medalist(s)		2nd place, silver medalist(s)		0	2	0	2
14	Argentina							1st place, gold medalist(s)			1	0	0	1
14	Colombia				1st place, gold medalist(s)						1	0	0	1
14	Great Britain				1st place, gold medalist(s)						1	0	0	1
14	Netherlands				1st place, gold medalist(s)						1	0	0	1
18	Nicaragua				2nd place, silver medalist(s)						0	1	0	1
18	Panama				2nd place, silver medalist(s)						0	1	0	1
20	Bahamas							3rd place, bronze medalist(s)			0	0	1	1
20	France									3rd place, bronze medalist(s)	0	0	1	1
20	Philippines								3rd place, bronze medalist(s)		0	0	1	1

=== Baseball and softball ===
==== Men and women ====
Last updated after the 2026 World Baseball Classic (As of 17 March 2026)
		Baseball					Softball			Number of			
		Olympic Games	World Baseball Classic	Premier12	World Cup		Olympic Games	World Championship		Number of			
Rk.	Nation	Men	Men	Men	Men	Women	Women	Men	Women	1st place, gold medalist(s)	2nd place, silver medalist(s)	3rd place, bronze medalist(s)	Total
1	United States	1st place, gold medalist(s)	1st place, gold medalist(s)	2nd place, silver medalist(s)	1st place, gold medalist(s)	1st place, gold medalist(s)	1st place, gold medalist(s)	1st place, gold medalist(s)	1st place, gold medalist(s)	7	1	0	8
2	Japan	1st place, gold medalist(s)	1st place, gold medalist(s)	1st place, gold medalist(s)	2nd place, silver medalist(s)	1st place, gold medalist(s)	1st place, gold medalist(s)	2nd place, silver medalist(s)	1st place, gold medalist(s)	6	2	0	8
3	Australia	2nd place, silver medalist(s)				2nd place, silver medalist(s)	2nd place, silver medalist(s)	1st place, gold medalist(s)	1st place, gold medalist(s)	2	3	0	5
4	Chinese Taipei	2nd place, silver medalist(s)		1st place, gold medalist(s)	2nd place, silver medalist(s)	2nd place, silver medalist(s)			2nd place, silver medalist(s)	1	4	0	5
5	Canada				3rd place, bronze medalist(s)	2nd place, silver medalist(s)	3rd place, bronze medalist(s)	1st place, gold medalist(s)	2nd place, silver medalist(s)	1	2	2	5
6	South Korea	1st place, gold medalist(s)	2nd place, silver medalist(s)	1st place, gold medalist(s)	1st place, gold medalist(s)					3	1	0	4
7	Venezuela		1st place, gold medalist(s)		1st place, gold medalist(s)	3rd place, bronze medalist(s)		1st place, gold medalist(s)		3	0	1	4
8	Mexico		3rd place, bronze medalist(s)	3rd place, bronze medalist(s)	2nd place, silver medalist(s)			2nd place, silver medalist(s)		0	2	2	4
9	Cuba	1st place, gold medalist(s)	2nd place, silver medalist(s)		1st place, gold medalist(s)					2	1	0	3
10	Dominican Republic	3rd place, bronze medalist(s)	1st place, gold medalist(s)		1st place, gold medalist(s)					2	0	1	3
11	New Zealand							1st place, gold medalist(s)	1st place, gold medalist(s)	2	0	0	2
12	Puerto Rico		2nd place, silver medalist(s)		1st place, gold medalist(s)					1	1	0	2
13	China						2nd place, silver medalist(s)		2nd place, silver medalist(s)	0	2	0	2
14	Argentina							1st place, gold medalist(s)		1	0	0	1
14	Colombia				1st place, gold medalist(s)					1	0	0	1
14	Great Britain				1st place, gold medalist(s)					1	0	0	1
14	Netherlands				1st place, gold medalist(s)					1	0	0	1
18	Nicaragua				2nd place, silver medalist(s)					0	1	0	1
18	Panama				2nd place, silver medalist(s)					0	1	0	1
20	Bahamas							3rd place, bronze medalist(s)		0	0	1	1
20	Philippines								3rd place, bronze medalist(s)	0	0	1	1

==== Men ====
Last updated after the 2026 World Baseball Classic (As of 17 March 2026)
		Baseball				Softball	Number of			
		Olympic Games	World Baseball Classic	Premier12	World Cup	World Championship	Number of			
Rk.	Nation	Men	Men	Men	Men	Men	1st place, gold medalist(s)	2nd place, silver medalist(s)	3rd place, bronze medalist(s)	Total
1	United States	1st place, gold medalist(s)	1st place, gold medalist(s)	2nd place, silver medalist(s)	1st place, gold medalist(s)	1st place, gold medalist(s)	4	1	0	5
2	Japan	2nd place, silver medalist(s)	1st place, gold medalist(s)	1st place, gold medalist(s)	2nd place, silver medalist(s)	2nd place, silver medalist(s)	2	3	0	5
3	South Korea	1st place, gold medalist(s)	2nd place, silver medalist(s)	1st place, gold medalist(s)	1st place, gold medalist(s)		3	1	0	4
4	Mexico		3rd place, bronze medalist(s)	3rd place, bronze medalist(s)	2nd place, silver medalist(s)	2nd place, silver medalist(s)	0	2	2	4
5	Venezuela		1st place, gold medalist(s)		1st place, gold medalist(s)	1st place, gold medalist(s)	3	0	0	3
6	Cuba	1st place, gold medalist(s)	2nd place, silver medalist(s)		1st place, gold medalist(s)		2	1	0	3
7	Chinese Taipei	2nd place, silver medalist(s)		1st place, gold medalist(s)	2nd place, silver medalist(s)		1	2	0	3
8	Dominican Republic		1st place, gold medalist(s)		1st place, gold medalist(s)		2	0	0	2
9	Australia	2nd place, silver medalist(s)				1st place, gold medalist(s)	1	1	0	2
10	Puerto Rico		2nd place, silver medalist(s)		1st place, gold medalist(s)		1	1	0	2
11	Canada				3rd place, bronze medalist(s)	1st place, gold medalist(s)	1	0	1	2
12	Argentina					1st place, gold medalist(s)	1	0	0	1
12	Colombia				1st place, gold medalist(s)		1	0	0	1
12	Great Britain				1st place, gold medalist(s)		1	0	0	1
12	Netherlands				1st place, gold medalist(s)		1	0	0	1
12	New Zealand					1st place, gold medalist(s)	1	0	0	1
17	Nicaragua				2nd place, silver medalist(s)		0	1	0	1
17	Panama				2nd place, silver medalist(s)		0	1	0	1
19	Bahamas					3rd place, bronze medalist(s)	0	0	1	1

==== Women ====
Last updated after the 2024 Women's Baseball World Cup (As of 13 August 2024)
		Baseball	Softball		Number of			
		World Cup	Olympic Games	World Championship	Number of			
Rk.	Nation	Women	Women	Women	1st place, gold medalist(s)	2nd place, silver medalist(s)	3rd place, bronze medalist(s)	Total
1	Japan	1st place, gold medalist(s)	1st place, gold medalist(s)	1st place, gold medalist(s)	3	0	0	3
1	United States	1st place, gold medalist(s)	1st place, gold medalist(s)	1st place, gold medalist(s)	3	0	0	3
3	Australia	2nd place, silver medalist(s)	2nd place, silver medalist(s)	1st place, gold medalist(s)	1	2	0	3
4	Canada	2nd place, silver medalist(s)	3rd place, bronze medalist(s)	2nd place, silver medalist(s)	0	2	1	3
5	China		2nd place, silver medalist(s)	2nd place, silver medalist(s)	0	2	0	2
5	Chinese Taipei	2nd place, silver medalist(s)		2nd place, silver medalist(s)	0	2	0	2
7	New Zealand			1st place, gold medalist(s)	1	0	0	1
8	Philippines			3rd place, bronze medalist(s)	0	0	1	1
8	Venezuela	3rd place, bronze medalist(s)			0	0	1	1

=== Baseball ===
Last updated after the 2026 World Baseball Classic (As of 17 March 2026)
		Baseball					Number of			
		Olympic Games	World Baseball Classic	Premier12	World Cup		Number of			
Rk.	Nation	Men	Men	Men	Men	Women	1st place, gold medalist(s)	2nd place, silver medalist(s)	3rd place, bronze medalist(s)	Total
1	United States	1st place, gold medalist(s)	1st place, gold medalist(s)	2nd place, silver medalist(s)	1st place, gold medalist(s)	1st place, gold medalist(s)	4	1	0	5
2	Japan	2nd place, silver medalist(s)	1st place, gold medalist(s)	1st place, gold medalist(s)	2nd place, silver medalist(s)	1st place, gold medalist(s)	3	2	0	5
3	South Korea	1st place, gold medalist(s)	2nd place, silver medalist(s)	1st place, gold medalist(s)	1st place, gold medalist(s)		3	1	0	4
4	Chinese Taipei	2nd place, silver medalist(s)		1st place, gold medalist(s)	2nd place, silver medalist(s)	2nd place, silver medalist(s)	1	3	0	4
5	Cuba	1st place, gold medalist(s)	2nd place, silver medalist(s)		1st place, gold medalist(s)		2	1	0	3
6	Venezuela		1st place, gold medalist(s)		1st place, gold medalist(s)	3rd place, bronze medalist(s)	2	0	1	3
7	Mexico		3rd place, bronze medalist(s)	3rd place, bronze medalist(s)	2nd place, silver medalist(s)		0	1	2	3
8	Dominican Republic		1st place, gold medalist(s)		1st place, gold medalist(s)		2	0	0	2
9	Puerto Rico		2nd place, silver medalist(s)		1st place, gold medalist(s)		1	1	0	2
10	Australia	2nd place, silver medalist(s)				2nd place, silver medalist(s)	0	2	0	2
11	Canada				3rd place, bronze medalist(s)	2nd place, silver medalist(s)	0	1	1	2
12	Colombia				1st place, gold medalist(s)		1	0	0	1
12	Great Britain				1st place, gold medalist(s)		1	0	0	1
12	Netherlands				1st place, gold medalist(s)		1	0	0	1
15	Nicaragua				2nd place, silver medalist(s)		0	1	0	1
15	Panama				2nd place, silver medalist(s)		0	1	0	1

=== Softball ===
Last updated after the 2025 Men's Softball World Cup (As of 13 July 2025)
		Softball			Number of			
		Olympic Games	World Championship		Number of			
Rk.	Nation	Women	Men	Women	1st place, gold medalist(s)	2nd place, silver medalist(s)	3rd place, bronze medalist(s)	Total
1	United States	1st place, gold medalist(s)	1st place, gold medalist(s)	1st place, gold medalist(s)	3	0	0	3
2	Australia	2nd place, silver medalist(s)	1st place, gold medalist(s)	1st place, gold medalist(s)	2	1	0	3
2	Japan	1st place, gold medalist(s)	2nd place, silver medalist(s)	1st place, gold medalist(s)	2	1	0	3
4	Canada	3rd place, bronze medalist(s)	1st place, gold medalist(s)	2nd place, silver medalist(s)	1	1	1	3
5	New Zealand		1st place, gold medalist(s)	1st place, gold medalist(s)	2	0	0	2
6	China	2nd place, silver medalist(s)		2nd place, silver medalist(s)	0	2	0	2
7	Argentina		1st place, gold medalist(s)		1	0	0	1
7	Venezuela		1st place, gold medalist(s)		1	0	0	1
9	Chinese Taipei			2nd place, silver medalist(s)	0	1	0	1
9	Mexico		2nd place, silver medalist(s)		0	1	0	1
11	Bahamas		3rd place, bronze medalist(s)		0	0	1	1
11	Philippines			3rd place, bronze medalist(s)	0	0	1	1

=== Baseball5 ===
Last updated after the 2024 Baseball5 World Cup (As of 12 October 2024)
		Baseball5	Number of			
		World Cup	Number of			
Rk.	Nation	Mixed	1st place, gold medalist(s)	2nd place, silver medalist(s)	3rd place, bronze medalist(s)	Total
1	Cuba	1st place, gold medalist(s)	1	0	0	1
2	Japan	2nd place, silver medalist(s)	0	1	0	1
3	Chinese Taipei	3rd place, bronze medalist(s)	0	0	1	1
3	France	3rd place, bronze medalist(s)	0	0	1	1

== See also ==
- WBSC World Rankings
- List of major achievements in sports by nation
