= Juan Isa =

Baseball executive

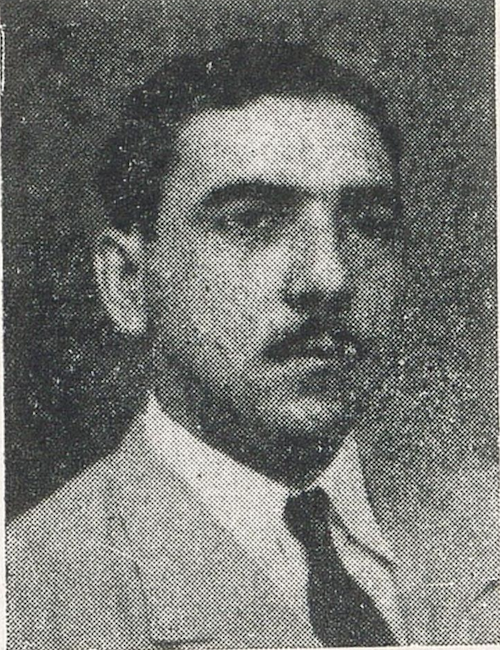

President of FIBA
- In office 26 September 1969 – 4 January 1976
- Preceded by: Carlos Manuel Zecca
- Succeeded by: Manuel González Guerra

Personal details
- Born: August 26, 1913 Lara, Venezuela
- Died: October 19, 1993 (aged 80)
- Occupation: Baseball administrator

Juan Isa (August 26, 1913 — October 19, 1993) was a Venezuelan-born Dutch Antillean baseball executive, administrator, and businessman. He was president of the International Baseball Federation (FIBA) from 1969 to 1976.

Isa also co-founded the Netherlands Antilles Olympic Committee, and was inducted into the Curaçao Olympic Hall of Fame.

== Business career ==
Isa was a major business magnate in Curaçao, where he owned a bakery in Curaçao, which opened in 1932, as well as an electronics and hardware store. He also owned an Oldsmobile car dealership on the island.

== FIBA presidency ==
Isa's candidacy for the FIBA presidency was supported by Venezuela. He expanded FIBA's reach to include Europe, inviting the Netherlands and Italy to the 1970 Amateur World Series. He also met with Lord Killanin, president of the International Olympic Committee, in an attempt to include baseball in the program of the Olympic Games.

During his term as head of FIBA, the organization was rocked by several controversies, such as Isa's decision to allow Dutch Antillean players from Curaçao and Aruba to represent the Netherlands in international competition, despite the objections of the Italian federation. Isa was criticized for centralizing control of the organization, as well as the arbitrary removal of Nicaragua from hosting the 1973 Amateur World Series.

Tensions came to a head at the 1973 FIBA Congress, held in Curaçao, where Isa refused to hold elections. After that, several national federations, including Italy, Nicaragua, and the United States, left FIBA to form FEMBA (Spanish: Federación Mundial de Béisbol Amateur), causing a split in the international baseball world.

The FEMBA-FIBA split was resolved in 1976 thanks to the mediation of Mexican Olympic Committee president Mario Vázquez Raña; FIBA was reorganized as AINBA (Spanish: Asociación Internacional de Béisbol Amateur), with Manuel González Guerra elected president and Carlos García Solórzano vice president.

== Bibliography ==
- Riccardo Schiroli (2019). The Game We Love (PDF). World Baseball Softball Confederation. pp. 74–79.
