= Eppie Barnes =

American athlete and sports executive (1900–1980)

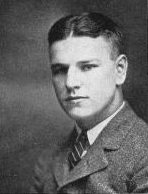

President of the U.S. Baseball Federation
- In office January 6, 1965 – April 6, 1966
- Succeeded by: William E. Fehring

Personal details
- Born: December 1, 1900 Ossining, New York, U.S.
- Died: November 17, 1980 (aged 79) Mineola, New York, U.S.
- Baseball career
- First baseman
- Batted: Left Threw: Left

MLB debut
- September 24, 1923, for the Pittsburgh Pirates

Last MLB appearance
- September 24, 1924, for the Pittsburgh Pirates

MLB statistics
- Batting average: .143
- Hits: 1
- RBI: 0
- Stats at Baseball Reference

Teams
- Pittsburgh Pirates (1923–1924)

Everett Duane "Eppie" Barnes (December 1, 1900 – November 17, 1980) was an American professional baseball player, coach, and executive. He played four games as an infielder for the Pittsburgh Pirates of Major League Baseball during the 1923 and 1924 baseball seasons. He later coached baseball at Colgate University, and was the president of the United States Baseball Federation when it was reestablished in 1965.

While coaching at Colgate, Barnes helped establish the American Association of College Baseball Coaches in 1948, and was an administrator of the National Collegiate Athletic Association. He is a member of the Colgate Athletics Hall of Honor, the United Savings-Helms Athletic Foundation Hall of Fame, and the College Baseball Hall of Fame.

Barnes also participated in basketball for pay in the Central New York and Long Island areas. He played for the Utica Knights of Columbus and the Syracuse Alhambras during the 1922–23 seasons and played with the Rockville Centre Firemen during the 1932–33 season.

== Biography ==
Barnes, born in Ossining, New York, was a graduate of Erasmus Hall High School and Colgate University.

From 1928 to 1936, he was the regular first baseman for the semipro Brooklyn Bushwicks baseball team. In 1930, he was a pitcher for the Sunrise Trails, and in 1939 played briefly with the Springfield Greys.

Barnes was the first president of the United States Baseball Federation (USBF) when it was formed by several amateur baseball groups, including the American Association of College Baseball Coaches, in early 1962. This incarnation of the United States Baseball Federation (USBF) was officially incorporated on January 6, 1965. Barnes was its president. He sought to persuade the International Olympic Committee to recognize baseball as an Olympic sport. Barnes was replaced as USBF president by William "Dutch" Fehring on April 6, 1966.
