= Baseball5 African Championship =

- Sport: Baseball5
- Founded: 2022
- No. of teams: 8
- Continent: Africa
- Most recent champion: Tunisia (2nd title)
- Most titles: Tunisia (2 titles)
- 2024 Baseball5 African Championship

The Baseball5 African Championship is the main Baseball5 tournament in Africa, governed by WBSC Africa. The winners and runners-up qualify to the Baseball5 World Cup.

== History ==
The inaugural tournament of the Baseball5 African Championship was held from 23 to 26 May 2022, in the Tanzania National Indoor Stadium in Dar es Salaam, Tanzania, with ten national teams taking part. South Africa won the championship defeating Kenya in the final 2 sets to 0; both teams qualified for the 2022 Baseball5 World Cup held in Mexico City.

The second edition of the championship was held in Gimnodesportivo Vavá Duarte in Praia, Cape Verde. Tunisia won the tournament defeating South Africa 2 sets to 0 in the championship game. Both teams qualified for the 2024 Baseball5 World Cup.

== Results ==
Year	Host	Final			Third place game		
Year	Host	Champions	Score	Runners-up	Third place	Score	Fourth place
2022; Details	(Tanzania); Dar es Salaam	South Africa	2–0	Kenya	Tunisia	2–0	Uganda
2024; Details	(Cape Verde); Praia	Tunisia	2–0	South Africa	Cape Verde	2–0	Tanzania
2025; Details	(Zambia); Lusaka	Tunisia	2–0	South Africa	Kenya	2–1	Cape Verde

=== Medal table ===
Rank	Nation	Gold	Silver	Bronze	Total
1	Tunisia	2	0	1	3
2	South Africa	1	2	0	3
3	Kenya	0	1	1	2
4	Cape Verde	0	0	1	1
Totals (4 entries)		3	3	3	9

=== Participating teams ===
Teams	(Tanzania) 2022	(Cape Verde) 2024	(Zambia) 2025	Years
Burkina Faso	8th		6th	2
Cape Verde		3rd	4th	2
Egypt	10th			1
Ghana	7th			1
Kenya	2nd		3rd	2
South Africa	1st	2nd	2nd	3
Tanzania	5th	4th		2
Tunisia	3rd	1st	1st	3
Uganda	4th			1
Zambia	6th		5th	2
Zimbabwe	9th			1
Total	10	4	6	

== See also ==
- Baseball5 World Cup
- Youth Baseball5 World Cup
- Baseball5 Asia Cup
- Baseball5 European Championship
- Baseball5 Pan American Championship
