= Harvey Schiller =

American sports executive (born 1940)

Harvey W. Schiller

President of the IBAF
- In office March 2, 2007 – December 6, 2009
- Preceded by: Aldo Notari
- Succeeded by: Riccardo Fraccari

Personal details
- Born: April 30, 1940 (age 86) Brooklyn, New York, U.S.
- Spouse: Marcia Schiller
- Children: Derek Schiller; Erika Schiller
- Education: The Citadel; University of Michigan
- Profession: Sports and Business Executive
- Civilian awards: Olympic Order; Ellis Island Award 1990

Military service
- Allegiance: United States
- Branch/service: United States Air Force
- Years of service: 1962 – 1986
- Rank: Brigadier General
- Battles/wars: Vietnam War
- Military awards: Distinguished Flying Cross Air Medal with 9 oak leaf clusters Legion of Merit; Meritorious Service Medal; Commendation Medal with 2 Oak Leaf Clusters; Outstanding Unit Award with 1 Oak Leaf Cluster; Organizational Excellence Award; Air and Space Recognition Ribbon with 1 Oak Leaf Cluster; National Defense Service Medal; Republic of Vietnam Campaign Medal; Republic of Vietnam Gallantry Cross with Palm; Vietnam Service Medal with 2 Oak Leaf Clusters; Command Pilot Badge; Army Airborne Badge Permanent Professor Badge

Harvey Wallace Schiller (born April 30, 1940) is an American sports and business executive whose positions have included executive director of the United States Olympic Committee, chief executive officer of YankeeNets, president of Turner Sports, head of the International Baseball Federation and president of the Atlanta Thrashers. He has been named several times as one of the "100 Most Powerful People in Sports" by Sporting News. Schiller is chairman of Schiller Management Group, CEO of Goal Acquisitions, and chairman of the National Medal of Honor Center for Leadership.

== Early life ==
A native of the Flatbush neighborhood of Brooklyn, New York, Schiller attended Erasmus Hall High School and The Citadel in Charleston, South Carolina, where he earned a bachelor's degree in chemistry and played football; one of his assistant coaches was Al Davis. Commissioned into the United States Air Force, he attended pilot training and flew more than a thousand sorties on the C-123 Provider in South Vietnam earning the Distinguished Flying Cross. After earning master's and doctoral degrees in chemistry from the University of Michigan, he spent most of his military career as a permanent professor and head of the chemistry department at the United States Air Force Academy, eventually retiring as a brigadier general.

== Career ==
Schiller's sports management career began in 1986 when he was appointed commissioner for the Southeastern Conference of the National Collegiate Athletic Association. In 1988, he was appointed executive director of the United States Olympic Committee, but resigned after less than three weeks on the job. He returned to the USOC in 1990 and oversaw a restructuring of the organization that led to increased support for athletes and introduction of drug testing; he instituted cash awards for medal winners, oversaw a major renovation of the Olympic Training Center in Colorado Springs, Colorado, and added new corporate sponsorships. He was also instrumental in landing the 1996 Summer Olympics for Atlanta and the 2002 Winter Olympics for Salt Lake City.

In 1994, business mogul Ted Turner tapped Schiller to become the first president of Turner Sports, a fledgling TV sports operation that produces game telecasts for Turner Network Television and TBS; he oversaw expansion that included the creation of Turner South. As the executive in charge of World Championship Wrestling he was the supervisor of Eric Bischoff, then-president of WCW; in a famous appearance on the wrestling show WCW Monday Nitro he suspended Bischoff from WCW on March 3, 1997. In 1997, Schiller also concurrently became president of the Atlanta Thrashers, an expansion franchise of the National Hockey League.

In 1999, George Steinbrenner selected Schiller to become CEO of YankeeNets, a conglomerate that owned the New York Yankees of Major League Baseball, the New Jersey Nets of the National Basketball Association and the New Jersey Devils of the National Hockey League. He was instrumental in creating the YES Network (Yankee Entertainment and Sports Network), a regional cable and sports channel that currently broadcasts games for the Yankees, Brooklyn Nets and New York City FC of Major League Soccer. From 2007 to 2009 he served as president of the International Baseball Federation, who also lobbied for inclusion of the sport in the Olympic Games. During his tenure a controversial rule about how extra innings are played was adopted, it became known as the "Schiller Rule". He served on the executive committee of the National Collegiate Athletic Association and was also appointed to the board of directors of the Baseball Hall of Fame, and the World Baseball Classic. In 2011, he was elected to The New York Athletic Club Hall of Fame.

Schiller was chairman of the unsuccessful bid by New York City to host the 2012 Olympics, and was also appointed to the Women and Sports Commission of the International Olympic Committee. In 2010, he was named to the America's Cup Advisory Board and in 2014 appointed first commercial commissioner; a position responsible for managing, marketing and site selection of the 2017 races held in Bermuda. From 2014 to 2018, Schiller was board of directors president for USA Team Handball.

Schiller has been chairman of Assante, USA, which provides life and financial management products, and in 2005 he started the GlobalOptions Group, an international risk management and business solutions company. He has been chairman of Collegiate Sports Management Group and vice chairman for digital media, entertainment and sports practice of Diversified Search and has been on the board of directors of Mesa Air Group, Walker Innovation, Sportsgrid, and Craft 1861.

He is chairman of USAF Academy Athletic Corporation and was appointed an honorary member of The Academy Association of Graduates. Schiller is also senior advisor to SailGP.

Schiller is chairman of Schiller Management Group, a consulting company. He is a member of the Presidential Commission on White House Scholars. Schiller is CEO of Goal Acquisitions, a special acquisitions company and chairman of the National Medal of Honor Center for Leadership.

== Recognition ==
Schiller has been awarded honorary doctorates from The Citadel (Two Doctorates), Northern Michigan University and the United States Sports Academy. He is a member of The Citadel Athletic, Science, and Business Halls of Fame and was awarded The Citadel's Palmetto Medal Award. Schiller was a recipient of the Ellis Island Award in 1990. In 1994, he was awarded the Olympic Order by the International Olympic Committee. In 2013, he was honored as one of the "Pioneers and Innovators in Sports Business" by Sports Business Journal.

== Philanthropy ==
Schiller and his wife Marcia have established the Harvey and Marcia Schiller Surgical Innovation Center at Medical University of South Carolina in Charleston, SC. The center is a dedicated center to improve patient outcomes and healthcare efficiencies through surgical innovation. Schiller is also a donor with his alma mater The Citadel.

== Military awards and honors ==
Distinguished Flying Cross	Distinguished Flying Cross	Air Medal	Air Medal with 9 Oak Leaf Clusters	Legion of Merit	Legion of Merit
Meritorius Service Medal	Meritorius Service Medal	Commendation Medal	Commendation Medal	Air and Space Outstanding Unit Award	Air and Space Outstanding Unit Award with one Oak Leaf Cluster
Air and Space Organizational Excellence Award	Air and Space Organizational Excellence Award	Air and Space Recognition Ribbon	Air and Space Recognition Ribbonwith one Oak Leaf Cluster	National Defense Service Medal	National Defense Service Medal
Vietnam Campaign Medal	Vietnam Campaign Medal	Gallantry Cross (South Vietnam)	Republic of Vietnam Gallantry Cross with Palm	Vietnam Service Medal	Vietnam Service Medal with two Oak Leaf Clusters
United States Aviator Badge	Command Pilot Badge	Parachutist Badge (United States)	Army Airborne Badge	Badges of the United States Air Force	Permanent Professor Badge

Sporting positions
Preceded by Aldo Notari	President of the International Baseball Federation; 2007–2009	Succeeded by Riccardo Fraccari
