= Tunisia national Baseball5 team =

Tunisia

Information
- Country: Tunisia
- Federation: Tunisian Baseball and Softball Federation
- Confederation: WBSC Africa
- Manager: Sofien Riahi

WBSC ranking
- Current: 5 (31 December 2025)

Baseball5 World Cup
- Appearances: 2 (first in 2022)
- Best result: 6th (1 time, in 2022)

Baseball5 African Championship
- Appearances: 2 (first in 2022)
- Best result: (gold) 1st (1 time, in 2024)

The Tunisia national Baseball5 team represents Tunisia in international Baseball5 competitions.

== History ==
Tunisia first participated in the 2022 Baseball5 African Championship held in Dar es Salaam, where they finished with a 2–2 record in the round robin, advancing to the knockout stage. Tunisia beat Tanzania in the quarter finals but lost to South Africa in the semifinals. In the bronze medal game, Tunisia defeated Uganda 2 matches to 0 to claim the bronze medal.

Tunisia was given a wild card spot by the World Baseball Softball Confederation to participate in the 2022 Baseball5 World Cup.

In the world championship, held in Mexico City, Tunisia finished third in their group with a 2–3 record, qualifying to the Super Round, where they finished last after losing all their matches. Tunisia finished sixth in the tournament with an overall 2–6 record.

Tunisia won the 2024 Baseball5 African Championship, held in Praia, Cape Verde, defeating South Africa 2 sets to 0 in the final game.

== Current roster ==
As of 7 October 2024

No.	Pos.	Player	Gender
17	UTL	Ilef Cheikh	F
11	UTL	Aziz Chtioui	M
40	UTL	Yahya Gara	M
1	UTL	Molka Jlajla	F
99	UTL	Wajih Mathlouthi	M
4	1B	Aicha Saidana	F
13	UTL	Mohamed Souihi	M
20	UTL	Sarra Zaouali	F

=== Staff ===
No.	Pos.	Name
--	Manager	Sofien Riahi

== Tournament record ==
=== Baseball5 World Cup ===
Baseball5 World Cup record
Year	Round	Position	W	L	RS	RA
(Mexico) 2022	Super round	6th	2	6	62	75
(Hong Kong) 2024	Placement round	7th	4	4	105	129
Total	2/2	–	6	10	167	204

=== Baseball5 African Championship ===
Baseball5 African Championship record
Year	Round	Position	W	L
(Tanzania) 2022	Semifinals	3rd	4	3
(Cape Verde) 2024	Final	1st	7	1
Total	2/2	–	11	4
