= Pablo Morales Pérez =

Venezuelan baseball executive and promoter

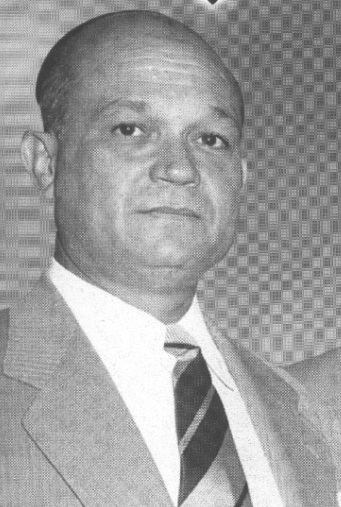

President of FIBA
- In office 18 December 1945 – 20 December 1947
- Preceded by: Jorge Reyes
- Succeeded by: Chale Pereira
- In office 14 December 1950 – 26 September 1952
- Preceded by: Chale Pereira
- Succeeded by: Carlos Manuel Zecca

Personal details
- Born: Pablo Antonio Morales Pérez; 17 August 1906 La Guaira, Vargas, Venezuela
- Died: 24 November 1969 (aged 63) Caracas, Venezuela
- Occupation: Baseball executive and promoter
- Baseball career

Member of the Venezuelan

Baseball Hall of Fame
- Induction: 2015

Pablo Antonio Morales Pérez (17 August 1906 – 24 November 1969) was a Venezuelan baseball executive and promoter. He served as president of the International Baseball Federation (FIBA) in two periods (1946–1947; 1951–1952), and also took the reins of the organizing committee of the 1944 Amateur World Series held in Caracas.

Along with business partner Oscar Prieto Ortiz, Morales helped found the Caribbean Series, an international club championship for the Latin American winter leagues. He was also the owner of the Leones del Caracas club, which would become the most successful baseball team in the Venezuelan Professional Baseball League.

== Biography ==
Born in La Guaira, Vargas, Morales was a widely known figure in Venezuelan baseball from the 1930s to the 1960s. Publicist and avid sport commentator, Morales worked in La Guaira and then in Caracas. His total dedication to baseball came in 1936, when he founded the Deportivo Caracas the same year and the Cardenales de La Guaira in 1940, clubs that participated in the Liga Nacional de Béisbol, which had stabilized the first national championship of first division in Venezuela since its inauguration in 1930.

Likewise, the first ever Caribbean Series tournament was the brainchild of Morales and Oscar Prieto Ortiz, his business partner since 1936, who devised the idea during Morales' IBF tenure and after seeing the success of the Serie Interamericana in 1946, which featured the clubs Brooklyn Bushwicks from the United States, Cervecería Caracas from Venezuela, Sultanes de Monterrey from Mexico, and an All-Star team from Cuba. The US team won each year from 1946 to 1949, while the Venezuelan club won the final tournament in 1950. Morales and Prieto then presented their idea to baseball representatives of Cuba, Panama and Puerto Rico during a meeting held in Havana on August 21, 1948. The representatives then agreed to stage a four-country, round-robin tournament 12-game to be known as the Serie del Caribe, to be launched in Cuba from February 20–25 of 1949.

Morales bought the Cervecería Caracas franchise in 1952 and renamed it as a new franchise as Leones del Caracas, to run one of the most popular and culturally significant clubs of the Venezuelan Professional Baseball League. Morales would remain the sole owner of the team until shortly before his death in 1969, when he included Prieto as legal partner.

In August 2015, Pablo Morales was enshrined into the Venezuelan Baseball Hall of Fame and Museum.
