= Jaime Mariné =

Baseball executive

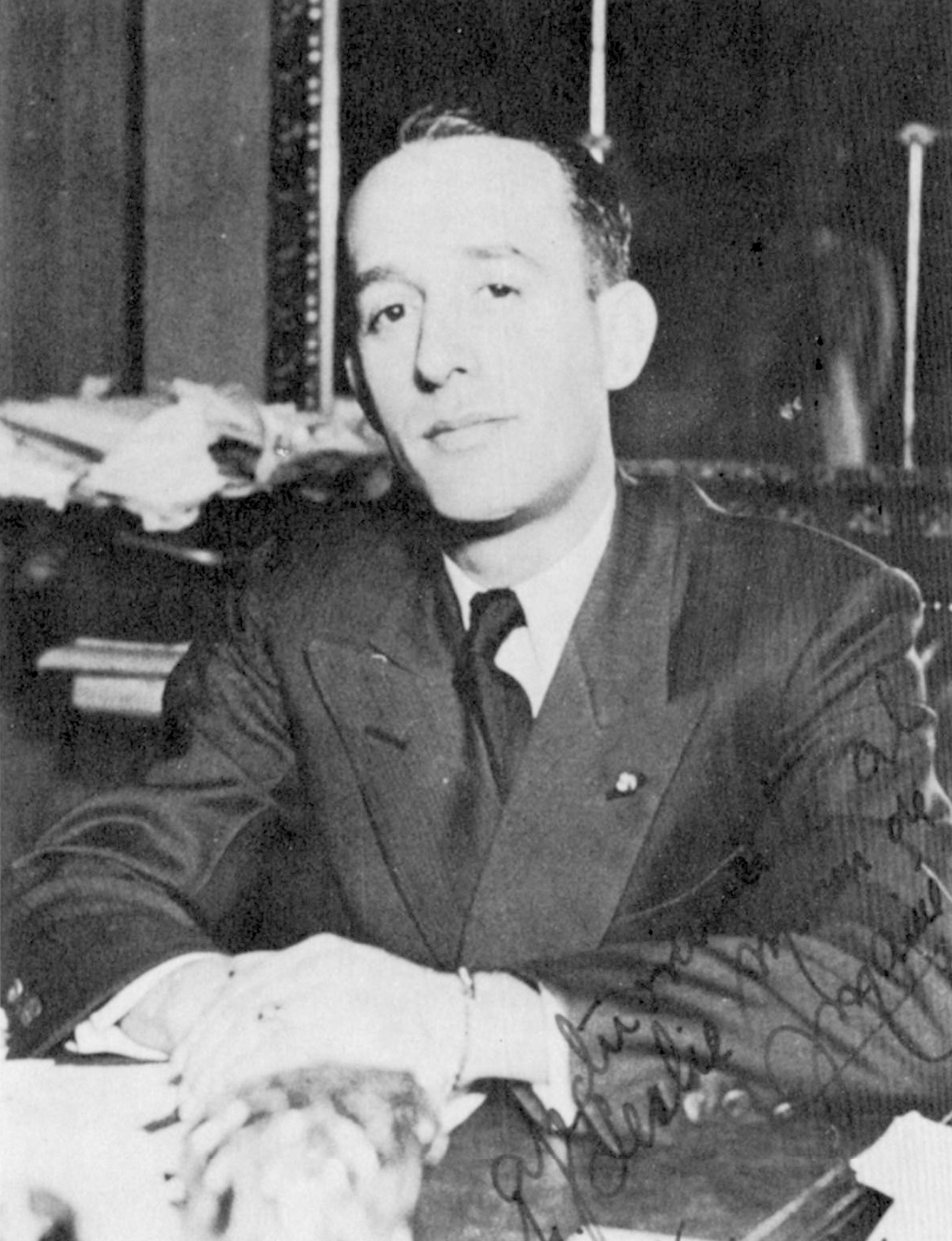

President of the IBF
- In office 6 October 1940 – 17 November 1944
- Preceded by: Leslie Mann
- Succeeded by: Jorge Reyes

Personal details
- Born: Catalonia, Spain
- Occupation: Baseball administrator

Military service
- Allegiance: Republic of Cuba
- Branch/service: Cuban Constitutional Army
- Rank: Lieutenant colonel

Jaime Mariné y Montes was a Cuban baseball administrator and soldier. He is best known as the second president of the International Baseball Federation (IBF) from 1940 to 1943. Mariné, nicknamed "El Catalancito," was also a close associate of Cuban dictator Fulgencio Batista.

== Early life ==
Mariné was born in Catalonia, Spain. He reportedly arrived in Cuba taking care of a gift horse from Spanish King Alfonso XIII to Cuban President Mario García Menocal. He took up residence in Havana and enlisted in the Cuban Army, where he first met Fulgencio Batista.

== Batista regime ==
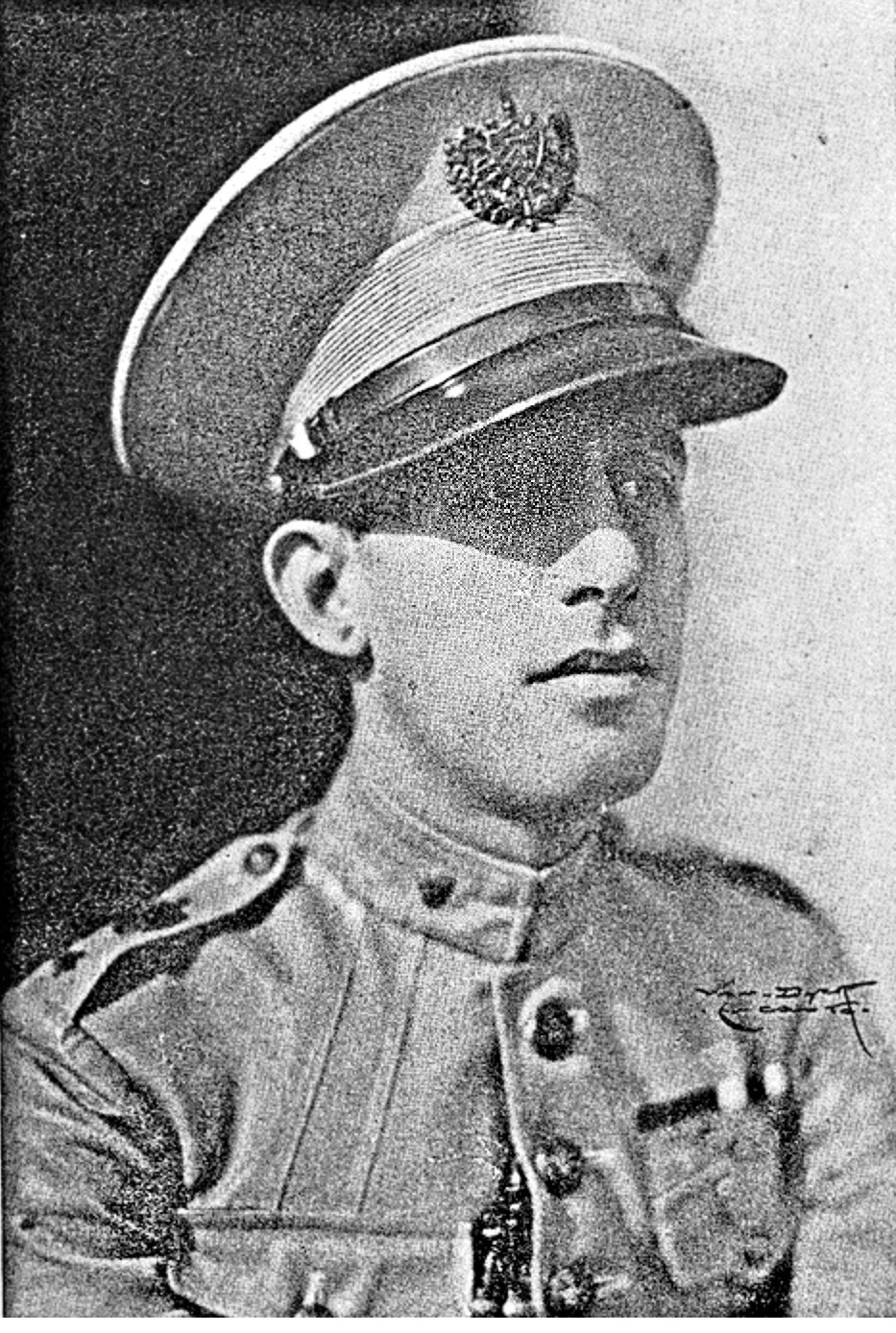
Mariné in military uniform, 1937

Mariné, as a sergeant in the Cuban Army, participated in the Cuban Revolution of 1933 that brought Fulgencio Batista to power. As Batista's aide-de-camp, he helped organize Batista's Military Intelligence Service in 1935. On Batista's behalf, Mariné was involved in the ouster of democratically-elected president Miguel Mariano Gómez in December 1936.

Cuban exile Mario Lazo described Mariné as "President Batista's spokesman in extra-legal transactions." The U.S. embassy in Havana suspected that Mariné was responsible for smuggling narcotics into Cuba during Batista's rule. Spruille Braden, a US diplomat in Cuba at the time, identified Mariné as behind the misappropriation of Lend-Lease materials; Braden considered him an individual "who sought selfish gain whether involved with private or governmental agencies." In another cable to Adolf A. Berle, Assistant Secretary of State for Latin American Affairs, Braden described Mariné as "the most corrupt of all the politicians" in Cuba. He was also suspected by the U.S. government of being a Francoist sympathizer during World War II.

== Baseball career ==
As administrator of Cuba's sports commission under Batista (Spanish: Dirección General Nacional de Deportes, or DGND), Mariné has been credited with helping to revive the Cuban League, after the financial instability brought by the Great Depression. Batista considered the disarray of the Cuban League to be a national disgrace, and he entrusted Mariné, along with professional baseball commissioner Ignacio Galíndez (another army officer), with restoring the circuit it to its former glory. Mariné also created the Juveniles, a youth league that, unlike existing amateur competitions, was open to members of all races.

Mariné helped to organize the 1939 Amateur World Series in Havana. He succeeded Leslie Mann as president of the International Baseball Federation, organizing four more Amateur World Series tournaments in the country (all but one of which were won by Cuba). In honor of Cuba's president, he renamed the tournament's trophy (previously named in honor of John Moores) as the Copa Presidente Batista. Mariné was aggressive in marking the boundary between amateur and professional baseball in Cuba, suspending Connie Marrero for illegally receiving payment for a game.

Some accounts say that Mariné was responsible for disinterring Cristóbal Torriente (known as "the Black Babe Ruth"), from his original burial site in New York City and returning him to the Cementerio Cristóbal Colón in Havana. Though reports were disseminated of Torriente's burial and enshrinement in the Cuban Baseball Hall of Fame, baseball researcher Peter C. Bjarkman says it is doubtful whether it actually happened, or whether the enshrinement was merely a propaganda tool for Batista. Torriente's current resting place is unknown.

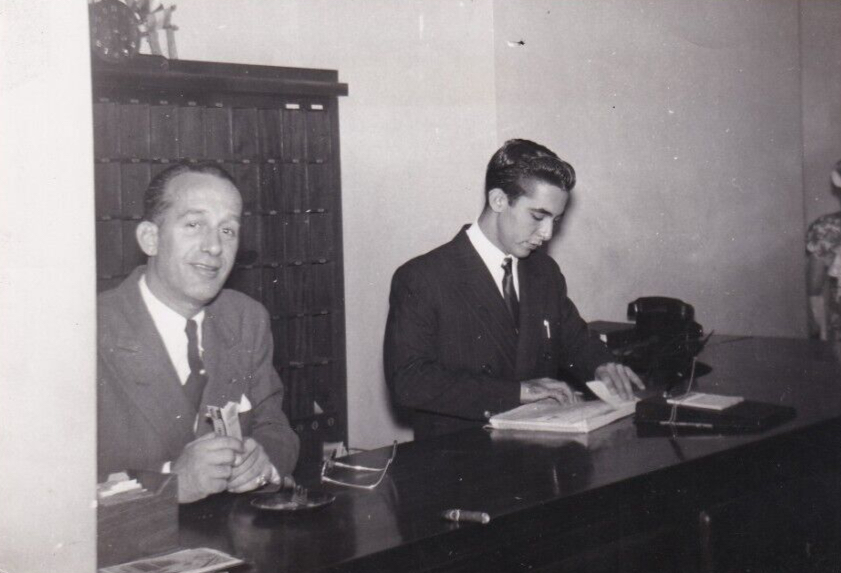
Mariné (left) and his son in Caracas, 1948

After Batista left office in 1944, Mariné was replaced as director general of sports by Luis Orlando Rodríguez.

== Later life and legacy ==
Mariné reportedly fled Cuba for Venezuela in 1944, after Batista's handpicked successor, Carlos Saladrigas Zayas, lost the 1944 elections to Ramón Grau. By that point, he was said to have few friends remaining on the island of Cuba. Mariné later purchased a string of hotels in Caracas.

While in Venezuela, Mariné helped organize the Interamerican Series, an international club tournament first played in 1946, which was the predecessor of the modern Caribbean Series.

Researcher Peter C. Bjarkman wrote that Mariné and the DGND were responsible for the surge in popularity of amateur baseball in Cuba, which grew to rival the professional Cuban League in the 1930s and early 1940s. Meanwhile, historian Roberto González Echevarría considers Mariné's administration of Cuban baseball, under the Batista regime, to be a precursor to the modern development of the sport after the Cuban Revolution:

Commander-in-chief Fidel Castro follows the footsteps of Colonel Mariné and General Galíndez. Germany's and the Soviet Union's investments in wide-ranging sports organizations to promote health, provide recreation, build character and martial spirit, as well as to cull the best athletes to represent the nation, became models followed by many countries, but especially post-revolutionary Cuba. The pomp and circumstance of military pageant was now reserved for victorious athletes, disciplined like soldiers, who would proudly carry national flags and occasionally wear native garb.

== Bibliography ==
- Echevarria, Roberto González (1999). The Pride of Havana: A History of Cuban Baseball. Oxford University Press. doi:10.1093/oso/9780195069914.003.0007.
