= 2024 Baseball5 African Championship =

Tournament details
- Country: Cape Verde
- Dates: 5–8 February
- Teams: 4

Final positions
- Champions: Tunisia (1st title)
- Runners-up: South Africa
- Third place: Cape Verde
- Fourth place: Tanzania

The 2024 Baseball5 African Championship was the second edition of the Baseball5 African Championship, a Baseball5 tournament organized by WBSC Africa. The championship was held from 5 to 8 February 2024, in the Gimnodesportivo Vavá Duarte in Praia, Cape Verde and was contested between four national teams.

Tunisia won the tournament, defeating previous winners South Africa in the final game 2 sets to 0. Hosts Cape Verde claimed the bronze medal, defeating Tanzania 2 sets to 0 in the bronze medal game.

== Venue ==
(Cape Verde) Praia
Gimnodesportivo Vavá Duarte
Capacity: 8,000
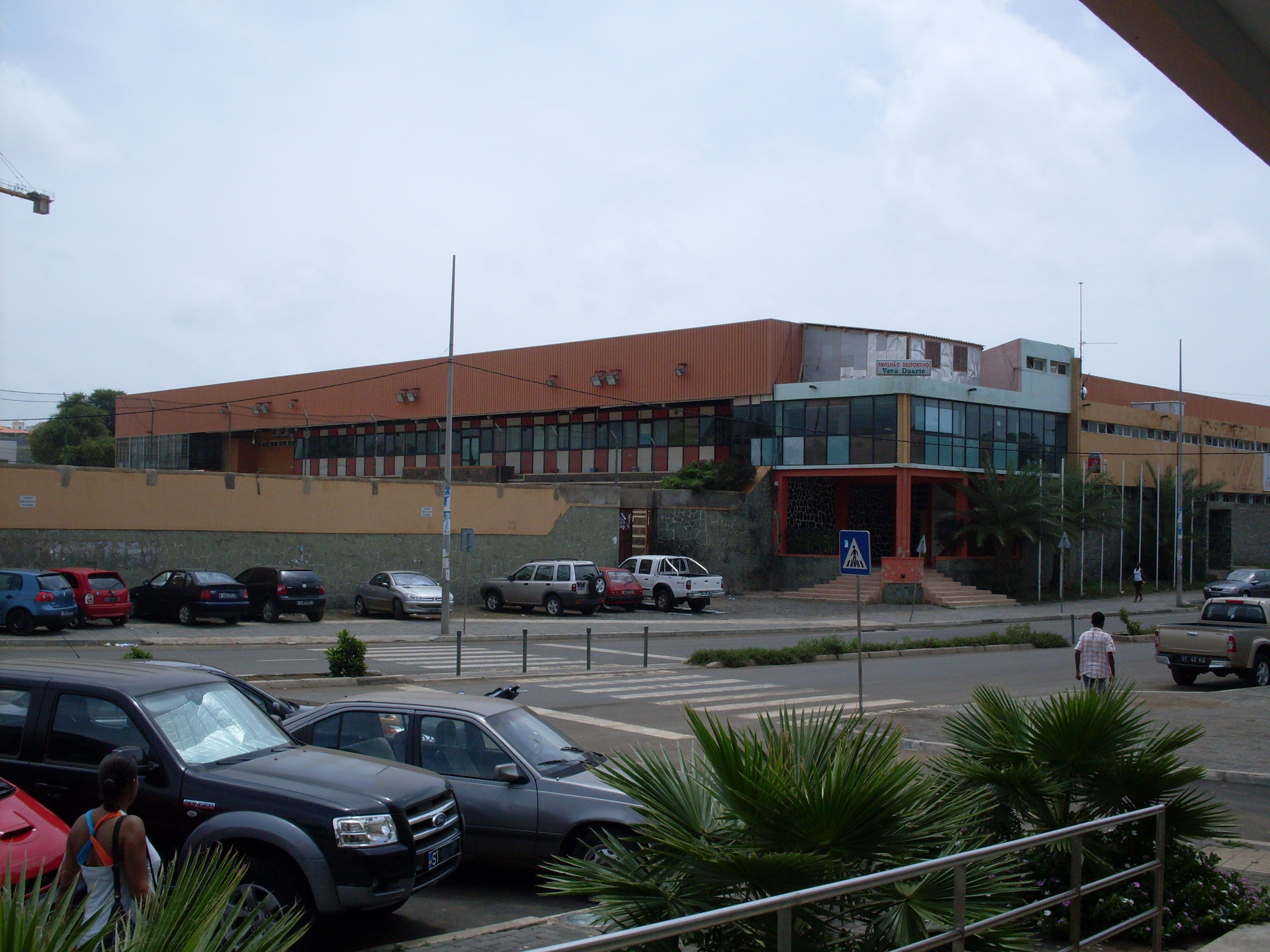

== Opening round ==
Pos	Team	Pld	W	L	PCT	GB	Qualification
1	Tunisia	6	5	1	.833	—	Advance to Knockout stage
2	South Africa	6	5	1	.833	—	Advance to Knockout stage
3	Cape Verde	6	2	4	.333	3	Advance to Knockout stage
4	Tanzania	6	0	6	.000	5	Advance to Knockout stage

Source: WBSC Africa

== Knockout stage ==
Semi-finals
Tunisia	11	2
Tanzania	2	0
South Africa	4	5
Cape Verde	2	3

Final
Tunisia	5	7
South Africa	1	6
Bronze medal game
Tanzania	2	3
Cape Verde	4	5

== Final standings ==
Pos	Team	W	L	Qualification
Gold medal	Tunisia	7	1	Qualified for 2024 Baseball5 World Cup
Silver medal	South Africa	6	2	Qualified for 2024 Baseball5 World Cup
Bronze medal	Cape Verde	3	5	
4	Tanzania	0	7	
