= Carlos Manuel Zecca =

Costa Rican baseball executive

President of FIBA
- In office 26 September 1952 – 26 September 1969
- Preceded by: Pablo Morales Pérez
- Succeeded by: Juan Isa

Personal details
- Born: August 24, 1922 Limón, Costa Rica
- Died: February 21, 2008 (aged 85) San José, Costa Rica
- Occupation: Baseball administrator

Carlos Manuel Zecca Sequeira (24 August 1922 — 21 February 2008) was a Costa Rican businessman and baseball executive who was the president of the International Baseball Federation (FIBA) from 1952 to 1969. Zecca's sixteen-year tenure as president of FIBA is the longest in international baseball history.

== Career ==
During his tenure as FIBA president, Zecca organized several regional baseball tournaments, including one in 1956 that saw multiple Central American and Caribbean countries participate. He served as the president of the Costa Rican Baseball Federation starting in 1960.

Zecca attempted to centralize the organization, inspired by the example set by the Confederation of European Baseball in 1955. He sought to organize a youth world championship and promoted the Monterrey team's in their championship-winning 1957 Little League World Series campaign, becoming the first team from outside the United States or Canada to participate. Zecca also took the first steps in organizing international baseball outside the Americas, promoting the foundation of the Asian Baseball Federation. He was a major proponent of including baseball in the Olympic Games, and managed to secure recognition from the International Olympic Committee; baseball was included as a demonstration sport in 1956 and 1964, though FIBA was unsuccessful in making it a medal sport.

After a long hiatus, he reorganized the Amateur World Series in 1961, which was held in his home country of Costa Rica. It was held again in Colombia in 1965 (though with the controversial absence of the Cuba national team, which was denied visas by the Colombian government). Zecca secured the return of the United States to the Amateur World Series in 1969; participation of the European nations would follow the next year under his successor, Juan Isa.

Zecca's tenure as FIBA president was controversial, as other Central American federations accused his administration as reflecting his own personal ambition rather than the interest of the game. Much of the controversy surrounded the participation of communist Cuba in international events, after the Venezuelan government's decision to deny visas to Cuban players scuttled plans for an Amateur World Series there. Determined to avoid this, Zecca declared that tournament organizers were not bound to ensure attendance of participating countries, if there were issues that "cannot logically be overcome within the laws of international sports." International Olympic Committee president Avery Brundage wrote to Zecca in an attempt to secure Cuba's participation in the 1965 Amateur World Series, to no avail. Zecca stood for reelection at the FIBA Congress held in the Dominican Republic in 1969, but lost to Isa in an election that returned just one incumbent to the executive committee.

Preceded by Pablo Morales Pérez	President of the International Baseball Federation; 1953 to 1969	Succeeded by Juan Isa
