= Kenya national Baseball5 team =

Kenya

Information
- Country: Kenya
- Federation: Baseball Federation of Kenya
- Confederation: WBSC Africa
- Manager: (Kenya) Susan Wanjiku Mwangi

WBSC ranking
- Current: 9 (31 December 2025)

Baseball5 World Cup
- Appearances: 1 (first in 2022)
- Best result: 8th (1 time, in 2022)

Baseball5 African Championship
- Appearances: 1 (first in 2022)
- Best result: (silver) 2nd (1 time, in 2022)

The Kenya national Baseball5 team represents Kenya in international Baseball5 competitions.

== History ==
Kenya first participated in the 2022 Baseball5 African Championship held in Dar es Salaam, where they finished the first round undefeated with a 4–0 record. In the knockout stage, Kenya advanced to the final, defeating Ghana and Uganda in the quarter finals and semifinals. In the final, Kenya lost against South Africa 0 games to 2, claiming the silver medal and qualifying to the 2022 Baseball5 World Cup.

In the 2022 Baseball5 World Cup, held in Mexico City, Kenya finished fifth in their group with a 2–3 record. In the placement round, Kenya defeated Hong Kong and Lithuania and lost against South Africa, finishing the tournament in eight position with an overall 4–4 record.

== Current roster ==
As of 12 November 2022

No.	Pos.	Player	Gender
33	3B	Duncan Makhatsa	M
8	1B	Pendo Hare	F
24	2B	Harry Kilivwa	M
3	1B	Mirium Mulwa	F
11	2B	Mary Nduati	F
18	3B	Katumo Ngovu	M
32	1B	Elizabeth Wairimu Njau	F
17	SS	Simon Okeyo	F

=== Staff ===
No.	Pos.	Name
--	Manager	Susan Wanjiku Mwangi

== Tournament record ==
=== Baseball5 World Cup ===
Baseball5 World Cup record
Year	Round	Position	W	L	RS	RA
(Mexico) 2022	Placement round	8th	4	4	49	76
Total	1/1	–	4	4	49	76

=== Baseball5 African Championship ===
Baseball5 African Championship record
Year	Round	Position	W	L
(Tanzania) 2022	Final	2nd	6	1
(Cape Verde) 2024	Did not enter			
Total	1/2	–	6	1
