= Carlos Pereira (footballer, born 1996) =

Paraguayan footballer

Personal information
- Full name: Carlos Alberto Pereira Villalba
- Date of birth: 17 January 1996 (age 30)
- Place of birth: Asunción, Paraguay
- Height: 1.76 m (5 ft 9 in)
- Position: Right midfielder

Team information
- Current team: 3 de Febrero FBC

Youth career
- 2010–2013: Sportivo San Lorenzo

Senior career*
Years	Team	Apps	(Gls)
2014–2015	Sportivo San Lorenzo	37	(8)
2016	Cerro Porteño	1	(0)
2024–	3 de Febrero FBC		
- * Club domestic league appearances and goals as of 18 February 2016

Carlos Alberto Pereira Villalba (born 17 January 1996) is a Paraguayan footballer who plays as a right midfielder for 3 de Febrero FBC.
