= Aldo Notari =

Italian baseball executive (1932–2006)

Aldo Notari (September 6, 1932 – July 26, 2006) was an Italian baseball player and executive who served as president of the International Baseball Federation (IBAF) from 1993 to 2006. He is best known for the creation of the World Baseball Classic during his term. However, his tenure was also criticized for precipitating the removal of baseball from the Olympic Games.

Notari played 17 seasons as a second baseman for Parma, and was present when the first professional game in Italy was played in 1948. He later went on to act as president of the club, leading it to four Italian League titles and six European Cup championships. Notari succeeded Bruno Beneck as the president of the Italian Baseball Softball Federation (FIBS) in 1985, and became president of the European Amateur Baseball Confederation (CEBA) two years later.

After being elected president of the IBAF, Notari sought to increase the level of international tournaments by relaxing the restrictions on professional baseball players, starting with the 1998 Baseball World Cup in Italy. However, he failed to reach an agreement with Major League Baseball (MLB) and their Players Association (MLBPA), and was said to have a particularly acrimonious relationship with MLBPA president Donald Fehr. The difficulty in securing MLB players to play in high-level tournaments, along with doping concerns, (Note: Notari dismissed the issue of steroid use in baseball as a factor in the sport's removal, asking "Is baseball the only sport to have an issue with doping?") contributed to the removal of baseball from the Olympic schedule in 2005

== Bibliography ==
- Riccardo Schiroli (2019). The Game We Love (PDF). World Baseball Softball Confederation.

Preceded by Robert E. Smith	President of the International Baseball Federation; 1993 to 2006	Succeeded by Harvey Schiller
