= Carlos García Solórzano =

Baseball executive (1931–2014)

President of FEMBA
- In office 31 August 1975 – 1 April 1976
- Preceded by: William Fehring
- Succeeded by: Manuel González Guerra (as president of AINBA)

President-elect of AINBA
- In role 1980–1981
- Preceded by: Manuel González Guerra
- Succeeded by: Robert E. Smith (interim)

Personal details
- Born: Carlos José García Solórzano Torrealba; April 30, 1931 Managua, Nicaragua
- Died: September 18, 2014 (aged 83)
- Occupation: Baseball administrator

Carlos José García Solórzano Torrealba (April 30, 1931 — September 18, 2014) was a Nicaraguan baseball executive and promoter. He was twice elected president of international baseball, first at the head of FEMBA, a short-lived breakaway group of the International Baseball Federation (FIBA), and then in 1980 he was elected to head FIBA itself (now renamed AINBA). However, García was arrested during the Nicaraguan Revolution and was unable to take office. He is also credited with saving baseball in Nicaragua after the first professional league collapsed in 1967, organizing the First Division amateur tournament (now the German Pomares Ordoñez Championship) starting in 1970.

García founded the Nicaraguan Olympic Committee in 1959. As president of the Nicaraguan Baseball Federation (FENIBA), he was responsible for the hosting of the 1973 Amateur World Series, which he was criticized for due to the country still suffering the effects of the 1972 Nicaragua earthquake. He campaigned for the inclusion of baseball in the Olympic Games. While imprisoned in 1980, he was told that the sport would be included at the 1984 Summer Olympics in Los Angeles, due to the efforts of him and his successor, Robert Smith.

An opponent of the Sandinistas, García was accused of heading an anti-communist militia known as the Fuerzas Armadas Democráticas (FAD) before his arrest. He was charged with spying for the CIA and supplying arms to the Contras, though he denied wrongdoing; García was never given a trial, just a 45-minute reading of the charges against him. He was released in 1984, in part due to the efforts of FIFA President João Havelange, and made his way to the United States, where he was welcomed to the White House by Ronald Reagan. Settling in Miami, he organized baseball leagues for Nicaraguan exiles; "In Nicaragua," he said, "first you have bread, then you have baseball."

García returned to Nicaragua in 1990, after the opposition won the elections, and became minister of the Nicaraguan Sports Institute (IND).
