= Baseball Federation of Cuba =

Governing body of the sport of baseball within Cuba

Baseball Federation of Cuba Federación Cubana de Béisbol
- Sport: Baseball
- Jurisdiction: National
- Membership: Confederation of Baseball of the Caribbean
- Abbreviation: FCB
- Founded: September 6, 1939
- Affiliation: International Baseball Federation (IBAF)
- Affiliation date: December 29, 1945
- Headquarters: Las Tunas
- President: Reynaldo Perez

Official website
- beisbolcubano.cu
- (Cuba)

The Baseball Federation of Cuba (Spanish: Federación Cubana de Béisbol, FCB) is the governing body of the sport of baseball in Cuba.

== History ==
The Baseball Federation of Cuba was established in 1938.

The professional Cuban League was dismantled in 1961, following the Cuban Revolution. It was replaced by the amateur Cuban baseball league system, administered by the Baseball Federation of Cuba. The Cuban National Series has operated as the primary baseball league in Cuba since then.

In late 2018, an agreement was reached between Major League Baseball (MLB), the Major League Baseball Players Association (MLBPA), and the Baseball Federation of Cuba. The agreement created a legal path for Cuban baseball players to sign with MLB teams without having to defect. However, the agreement was ruled illegal and was negated in April 2019.

== See also ==
- Cuba national baseball team
