= International Baseball Federation =

International baseball governing body

- Abbreviation: IBAF
- Formation: 1938; 88 years ago
- Type: International sport federation
- Purpose: Sport governing body
- Headquarters: Lausanne, Switzerland
- Location: Maison du Sport International
- Region served: Worldwide
- Members: 124 National Federations
- Official language: English, Spanish
- President: Riccardo Fraccari
- Parent organization: WBSC
- Website: www.IBAF.org

The International Baseball Federation (IBAF) is the former international governing body of baseball. It has since been superseded by the World Baseball Softball Confederation (WBSC), and continues to exist as the WBSC's baseball division. Between 1944 and 1975, it was known by its Spanish-language name, as the Federación Internacional de Béisbol Amateur, or FIBA.

Prior to the establishment of the WBSC, the IBAF was the sole entity recognized by the International Olympic Committee as overseeing the sport, and as the designated organizer and promoter of major international tournaments like the Baseball World Cup (originally the Amateur World Series) and the Intercontinental Cup. It also organized the inaugural World Baseball Classic (WBC), in cooperation with Major League Baseball, in 2006.

One of its principal responsibilities as the WBSC's umbrella is to organize, standardize and sanction international competitions, using the WBSC name, among baseball's 124 national governing bodies through its various tournaments to determine a world champion and calculate world rankings for both men's and women's baseball. Its offices are housed within the WBSC headquarters in Lausanne, Switzerland—the Olympic Capital.

== History ==
=== Background ===
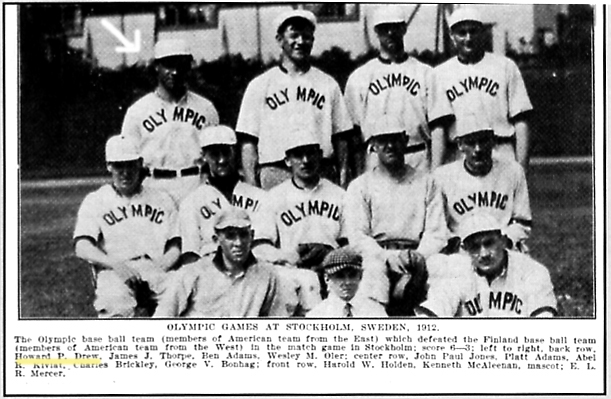
Baseball at the 1912 Olympics in Stockholm, Sweden

The first-ever international baseball event was a series of exhibition games that took place during the 1904 Summer Olympics in St. Louis, United States. The exhibition proved so successful that it was given an encore at the 1912 Summer Olympics in Stockholm, Sweden.

The two popular showings in St. Louis and Stockholm laid the groundwork for baseball's international surge in popularity, leading the sport to be placed onto the program as an exhibition sport at the 1936 Summer Olympics. This exhibition was extremely well received as 92,565 spectators filled the Olympic Stadium in Berlin to watch a game between two teams from the US.

Following the success of Berlin, the first ever Baseball World Cup was organized in London, England, in August 1938. The United States and Great Britain engaged in five games, of which the British won four.

The growth of baseball competitions involving the representation of countries, coupled with the birth of the Baseball World Cup, provided the need for an institution to help develop, organize, regulate and oversee these events, thus the International Baseball Federation was established in 1938. It was initially headquartered in the offices of Orange Bowl Stadium in Miami, Florida.

=== Early years and FIBA ===
Conflicts of World War II prompted the IOC to cancel the Summer Games that had been scheduled to take place in Tokyo in 1940 and in London in 1944, thereby halting baseball's tour as a demonstration sport. Nevertheless, by 1950, FIBA was able to expand the format of the Baseball World Cup that was contested in Managua, Nicaragua, to 12 participating countries.

In 1951, the Pan American Games were established and baseball was on the official program from the onset. In April 1953, Belgium, France, Germany, Italy and Spain came together to establish what is now known as the Confederation of European Baseball and organized the first ever European Baseball Championship a year later.

The Baseball Federation of Asia (BFA) was founded in May 1954 as the second continental confederation under the umbrella of FIBA. The BFA wasted little time in organizing its first continental tournament, as it celebrated the Asian Baseball Championship in December of that same year in Manila, Philippines.

The exposure of baseball to an international audience continued at the 1956 Summer Olympics, which saw approximately 114,000 spectators slowly fill the Melbourne Cricket Ground to witness Australia vs. US in a demonstration contest in Melbourne, Australia. This crowd of 114,000 was registered as a Guinness World Record for the largest attendance for any single baseball game. (The record lasted over 50 years before it was broken at a March 29, 2008 Major League Baseball exhibition game between the Boston Red Sox and Los Angeles Dodgers that drew 115,300 people to the Los Angeles Memorial Coliseum.)

Baseball as an Olympic demonstration sport was finally able to take its act to Asia at the 1964 Summer Olympics in Tokyo, Japan, where baseball was already exceptionally popular. Following the 1968 Summer Olympics, a selection of premier U.S. college players defeated the Cuba national team twice in Mexico City to win the International Amateur Baseball Tournament (though it was not officially a demonstration sport).

Juan Isa expanded FIBA's reach to include Europe, inviting the Netherlands and Italy to the Amateur World Series for the first time in 1970.

=== FEMBA split ===
Isa's tenure as president was controversial. Some federations felt that power had been concentrated in the hands of the Latin American federations for too long, to the detriment of federations in Europe and North America. Tensions came to a head at the 1973 FIBA Congress, where the Congress suspended Nicaragua and awarded the 1973 Amateur World Series to Cuba; Isa also refused to call for new elections. As a result, Nicaraguan, Italian, and U.S. officials withdrew from FIBA, and instead formed the Federación Mundial de Béisbol Amateur (World Amateur Baseball Federation), also knowns as FEMBA.

Other countries to join FEMBA included Argentina, Canada, Taiwan, Costa Rica, Ecuador, Guatemala, Japan, South Korea, Australia, and South Africa. William "Dutch" Fehring was elected president, and Carlos García Solórzano vice president. The Caribbean federations — Venezuela, Panama, Puerto Rico, Mexico, Cuba, and the Dutch Antilles — remained with FIBA. The Baseball Federation of Cuba characterized the division as driven by Cold War political tensions. However, this was denied by Roger Panaye, president of the European Amateur Baseball Confederation (CEBA):

FIBA was never more than a Caribbean affair with Cuba as chief spokesman. When a couple of years ago, many federations joined FIBA in order to have baseball recognised as an Olympic sport, nothing was done to make FIBA a real World Federation. On the contrary, the Caribbean FIBA leaders kept to their policy of dominating the others and administration was almost non-existent.

Under FEMBA, the first Intercontinental Cup was organized in 1973; another would follow in 1975. FEMBA also organized its own 1973 Amateur World Series in Nicaragua, to compete with the one being held by FIBA in Cuba.

Fehring, with the backing of MLB Commissioner Bowie Kuhn, pushed International Olympic Committee head Lord Killanin to include baseball at the Olympics. However, Killanin told him it would not occur as long as baseball was represented by two different organizations.

The FEMBA-FIBA split was resolved in 1976 thanks to the mediation of Mexican Olympic Committee president Mario Vázquez Raña; FIBA was reorganized as AINBA (Spanish: Asociación Internacional de Béisbol Amateur), with Manuel González Guerra elected president and Carlos García Solórzano vice president.

=== Baseball at the Summer Olympics ===
In 1978, the IOC awarded the hosting rights of the 1984 Summer Olympics to Los Angeles, and Robert Smith quickly went to work, in his capacity as a member of the United States Olympic Committee, to reestablish baseball as part of the Olympic Programme. Smith reached out to the then-Los Angeles Dodgers owner, Peter O'Malley, and University of Southern California head baseball coach and subsequent College Baseball Hall of Fame inductee, Rod Dedeaux. The group organized an IBAF congress the following year in Los Angeles in order to establish an Olympic Baseball Committee. Through these efforts, baseball was again categorized as a demonstration sport and an eight-team tournament was organized at Dodger Stadium, as part of the official Summer Olympic Programme. The present IBAF President, Riccardo Fraccari, was the head umpire of the championship game.

A third branch of the IBAF continental confederations formed in 1985. The Pan American Baseball Confederation (COPABE) was finally established after it was deemed necessary due to the strong expansion and increase of the national member federations stemming from the Olympic Baseball Committee campaign.

In 1986, a historic IOC vote put baseball onto the Olympic Programme as a medal sport for the 1992 Summer Olympics in Barcelona, Spain. Baseball would travel to Seoul, Korea, for the 1988 Summer Olympics. This was the final time the IBAF, in conjunction with the IOC, would organize baseball as a demonstration (not medal) sport at the Olympics.

In 1989, the Baseball Confederation of Oceania (BCO) was established as the 4th branch of the IBAF. The African Baseball and Softball Association (ABSA) was formed in Lagos, Nigeria soon after, in June 1990.

Baseball was played up in a traditional amateur format up until the 1996 Summer Olympics in Atlanta. In 1998, the IBAF, MLB and the Major League Baseball Players Association reached an agreement to allow the participation of professional players in international competition. The United States used a minor league selection to beat Cuba in the gold medal game at the 2000 Summer Olympics in Sydney, Australia. Cuba regained the world title, defeating Australia for the gold medal at the 2004 Summer Olympics in Athens, Greece.

=== Setbacks and reformation ===
On July 7, 2005, the IOC Session voted to remove baseball and softball from the 2012 Summer Olympics program. Baseball made its last Olympic appearance and Korea took the gold medal at the Beijing 2008 Summer Olympics.

The IBAF, under President Harvey Schiller, attempted to reinstate baseball onto the Olympic Programme, but the IOC vote of August 2009 kept baseball off the 2016 program, as golf and rugby were selected.

In February 2011, Dr. Harvey Schiller was appointed as a member of the IOC's Women and Sport Commission.

On April 1, 2011, the IBAF, under first-year President Riccardo Fraccari, and the International Softball Federation announced that they were studying how to prepare a joint proposal in order to revive play of both sports at the 2020 Summer Olympics. As part of that proposal, in April 2013, the two organizations began the process of merging into a new combined federation that will govern both sports, the World Baseball Softball Confederation (WBSC).

The merging was concluded in 2015, and WBSC managed to obtain the bid for 2020 Games on following months.

== International events ==
The International Baseball Federation organized the following world championship tournaments before WBSC merger:

- WBSC Premier 12
- World Baseball Classic
- IBAF Women's Baseball World Cup
- IBAF 23U Baseball World Cup (formerly 21U)
- IBAF 18U Baseball World Cup
- IBAF 15U Baseball World Cup (formerly 16U)
- IBAF 12U Baseball World Cup

The first-ever 12U Baseball World Championship was played in Taipei from July 8 to 17, 2011. Taiwan won the first title.

In addition, the IBAF is the sanctioning body for the World Baseball Classic, which is hosted by Major League Baseball and the Major League Baseball Players Association and held every four years in the year after the Summer Olympics. The IBAF abandoned its former world championship, the Baseball World Cup, after the 2011 edition in favor of an expanded World Baseball Classic. It was originally intended to be the sanctioning body for the Premier 12, a new men's international tournament – featuring the twelve best-ranked national teams – that began in 2015; that tournament instead has been sanctioned by the WBSC. This event is played in the year preceding the Summer Olympics.

The IBAF discontinued the Intercontinental Cup, which was an invitational event and last held in 2010.

== Organizational structure ==
The IBAF comprises five continental confederations that currently represent a total of 127 national member federations.

- IBAF Africa: African Baseball & Softball Association (ABSA) - 24 member countries
- IBAF Oceania: Baseball Confederation of Oceania (BCO) - 14 member countries
- IBAF Asia: Baseball Federation of Asia (BFA) - 24 member countries
- IBAF Europe: Confederation of European Baseball (French: Confédération Européenne de Baseball) (CEB) - 38 member countries
- IBAF Americas: Pan American Baseball Confederation (Spanish: Confederación Panamericana de Béisbol) (COPABE) - 27 member countries

== Presidents ==
- (United States) Leslie Mann: 1938
- (Cuba) Jaime Mariné: 1939 to 1943
- (Mexico) Jorge Reyes: 1944 to 1945
- (Venezuela) Pablo Morales: 1946 to 1947
- (Nicaragua) Chale Pereira: 1948 to 1950
- (Venezuela) Pablo Morales: 1951 to 1952
- (Costa Rica) Carlos Manuel Zecca: 1953 to 1968
- (Netherlands Antilles) FIBA: Juan Isa: 1969 to 1975 (FIBA from 1973 to 1975)
- (United States) FEMBA: William Fehring: 1973 to 1974
- (Nicaragua) FEMBA: Carlos J. García: 1975
- (Cuba) Manuel González Guerra: 1976 to 1979
- (United States) Robert E. Smith: 1981 to 1993
- (Italy) Aldo Notari: 1993 to 2006 (*)
- (Chinese Taipei) Tom Peng: 2006 to 2007
- (United States) Harvey Schiller: 2007 to 2009
- (Italy) Riccardo Fraccari: 2009 to present

(*) Aldo Notari died during the period as the president, thus the first vice president, Tom Peng of Taiwan, served as acting president from July 2006 to 2007.

== Awards ==
See also: Baseball awards of the International Baseball Fedederation (IBAF)

- Senior Athlete of the Year
- Junior Athlete of the Year
- Coach of the Year
- Umpire of the Year
- Member Federation Executive of the Year

== See also ==
- World Baseball Softball Confederation
