= Chale Pereira =

Nicaraguan baseball executive

Carlos "Chale" Pereira Ocampo was a Nicaraguan baseball executive who was the president of the International Baseball Federation (FIBA) from 1948 to 1950. Immediately after his election, he brought the 1948 edition of the Amateur World Series to his home country. He also organized the 1950 Amateur World Series in Nicaragua, managing to convince Cuba (which had boycotted the tournament since 1945) to return. However, Pereira was forced to resign from the FIBA presidency after it emerged that Puerto Rico had illegally included professional baseball players on their roster.

Preceded by Pablo Morales Pérez	President of the International Baseball Federation; 1948 to 1950	Succeeded by Pablo Morales Pérez
