= South Africa national Baseball5 team =

South Africa
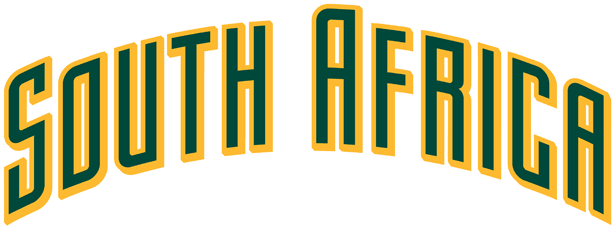

Information
- Country: South Africa
- Federation: South African Baseball Union
- Confederation: WBSC Africa
- Manager: Americo Juma

WBSC ranking
- Current: 13 (6 May 2026)

Baseball5 World Cup
- Appearances: 2 (first in 2022)
- Best result: 7th (1 time, in 2022)

Baseball5 African Championship
- Appearances: 2 (first in 2022)
- Best result: (gold) 1st (1 time, in 2022)

The South Africa national Baseball5 team represents South Africa in international Baseball5 competitions.

== History ==
South Africa won the 2022 Baseball5 African Championship held in Dar es Salaam, Tanzania finishing the tournament with a perfect 7–0 record and defeating Kenya in the final, 2 games to 0, winning the gold medal. South Africa qualified to the 2022 Baseball5 World Cup held in Mexico City, Mexico as African champions.

South Africa finished fifth in their group in the World Cup opening round with a 2–3 record and won all the placement round games to finish the tournament with an overall record of 5–3, ranking seventh.

== Current roster ==
As of 7 October 2024

| No. | Pos. | Player | Gender |
|---|---|---|---|
| 28 | UTL | Louis Albertyn | M |
| 26 | UTL | Aidan Bartes | M |
| 14 | UTL | Bridget Lamola | F |
| 22 | UTL | Austin Mangka | M |
| 18 | UTL | Sylvester Maredi | M |
| 2 | UTL | Itumeleng Moreroa | F |
| 48 | UTL | Kay'd Shay Naude | F |
| 29 | UTL | Bonolo Tlome | F |

=== Staff ===
| No. | Pos. | Name |
|---|---|---|
| -- | Manager | Americo Juma |

== Tournament record ==
=== Baseball5 World Cup ===
Baseball5 World Cup record
| Year | Round | Position | W | L | RS | RA |
|---|---|---|---|---|---|---|
| (Mexico) 2022 | Placement round | 7th | 5 | 3 | 56 | 52 |
| (Hong Kong) 2024 | Placement round | 11th | 1 | 7 | 55 | 146 |
| Total | 2/2 | – | 6 | 10 | 111 | 198 |

=== Baseball5 African Championship ===
Baseball5 African Championship record
| Year | Round | Position | W | L |
|---|---|---|---|---|
| (Tanzania) 2022 | Final | 1st | 7 | 0 |
| (Cape Verde) 2024 | Final | 2nd | 6 | 2 |
| Total | 1/1 | – | 13 | 2 |
