= Robert Smith (baseball) =

President of the International Baseball Federation (1936–2021)

Robert E. "Ish" Smith, (May 15, 1936 – August 18, 2021) was the President of the International Baseball Federation, which is the international governing body for the sport of baseball. He was also president of the United States Baseball Federation from 1980 to 1989.

As President of the International Baseball Association from 1981 to 1993, he is the person most credited with having had the sport of baseball added into the Olympic Games as an official gold medal sport. For these efforts, he was a recipient of the Olympic Order, the highest honor given by the International Olympic Committee (IOC).

== Baseball career ==
Smith graduated from Greenville College in Greenville, Illinois in 1957. He went to work at the college a few years after graduation as a physical education instructor and baseball coach, in 1961.

Smith began his work with the Olympics when he began to work on the United States Olympic Committee in 1977.

Smith was elected President of the United States Baseball Federation in 1980 (until 1989) and then quickly ascended to the presidency of the International Baseball Federation/International Baseball Association (IBA) the following year at the Baseball World Cup held in Japan. At the IBA's Congress in 1988, held in conjunction with the Nicaragua Baseball World Cup, Smith was re-elected as president, and he held the office until 1993. That year, he was succeeded by Aldo Notari of Italy.

During Dr. Smith's time as international leader of amateur baseball, he coordinated 26 world baseball tournaments, continued to serve on the United States Olympic Committee in varying capacities until 1990, and directed the baseball competitions at the Olympic Games in 1984 in Los Angeles, 1988 in Seoul, and 1992 in Barcelona.

Smith is often acknowledged as being responsible for baseball becoming an official Olympic sport. Baseball was allowed as a demonstration sport at the 1984 Los Angeles Games and Smith hoped that it would be played for medals in 1988 in Seoul. He and baseball's supporters in the effort did not make that goal, but nevertheless Smith's time as president was unique in that he saw the end to decades of work by baseball enthusiasts when the International Olympic Committee decided to add baseball as an official sport of the Games for 1992. He oversaw the winning of the first-ever gold medal for baseball, won by Cuba in Barcelona in 1992. The International Olympic Committee voted in 2006 to drop baseball and softball in the Olympics, beginning with the 2012 Games in London.

== Greenville College presidency ==
Smith served as a key development officer for Greenville College before being hired as vice president for Institutional Advancement. While serving in that capacity, Smith was chosen by the GC Board of Trustees as the ninth President of Greenville College. He retired in 1998 and has since worked with the Fellowship of Christian Athletes in southern Illinois.

Smith and his wife Joanna celebrated their 60th anniversary on August 30, 2017. The two had met as students at Greenville College in 1955 and married in San Diego in 1957. Joanna died on June 5, 2018, at the age of 81.

== Honors ==
Dr. Smith was given the Olympic Order, the highest honor given by the International Olympic Committee, for his efforts to bring gold medal baseball to fruition. It is awarded to "any person who has illustrated the Olympic ideal through his action, has achieved remarkable merit in the sporting world or has rendered outstanding services to the Olympic Movement, either through his own personal achievement or his own contribution to the development of sport.”

Smith was elected to the NAIA Hall of Fame as a baseball coach.

The NAIA Baseball Coaches Executive Committee created an award for baseball coaches and administrators, the "Robert E. Smith Achievement Award," with Smith as the first winner in 1999. The award honors "unselfish promotion of NAIA baseball" and is presented annually at the NAIA Baseball Hall of Fame and Honors Luncheon. Ish has also won the Turley award, which is a community service award for the city of Greenville. As a lasting reminder of his contributions to the college, Greenville College plays its baseball games on Robert E. Smith Field south of campus.

Preceded by Carlos García Solórzano	President of the International Baseball Federation; 1981 to 1993	Succeeded by Aldo Notari
