= 2022 South American Baseball Championship =

Tournament details
- Country: Peru
- Dates: July 24–30, 2022
- Teams: 5 (from 1 confederation)

Final positions
- Champions: Brazil (8th title)
- Runners-up: Argentina
- Third place: Ecuador
- Fourth place: Peru

Tournament statistics
- Games played: 14
- Attendance: 2,886 (206 per game)

Awards
- MVP: (Brazil) Marcelo Arai

The 2022 South American Baseball Championship was an international professional baseball tournament and the eighteenth iteration of the South American Baseball Championship. The tournament took place in Peru from July 24, 2022, to July 30, 2022.

Brazil won their 8th title, breaking the tie with Argentina for most championships won. In addition, Brazil has qualified for the 2023 Pan American Games.

Brazilian pitcher Marcelo Arai was awarded as the tournament's Most Valuable Player, while Argentine third baseman Pedro Figueras was named the Best Defensive Player.

== Teams ==
Five of the ten South American national teams competed in the championship.

Qualified teams
Team	WBSC World Rankings
Argentina	27
Bolivia	76
Brazil	23
Ecuador	NR
Peru	42

== Venue ==
Venue of the 2022 South American Baseball Championship
1 Campo de Béisbol

The venue for the 2022 South American Baseball Championship was the Campo de Béisbol in the Villa María del Triunfo district in Lima. The venue was used for the 2019 Pan American Games.

Venue
Campo de Béisbol
Capacity: 1,869
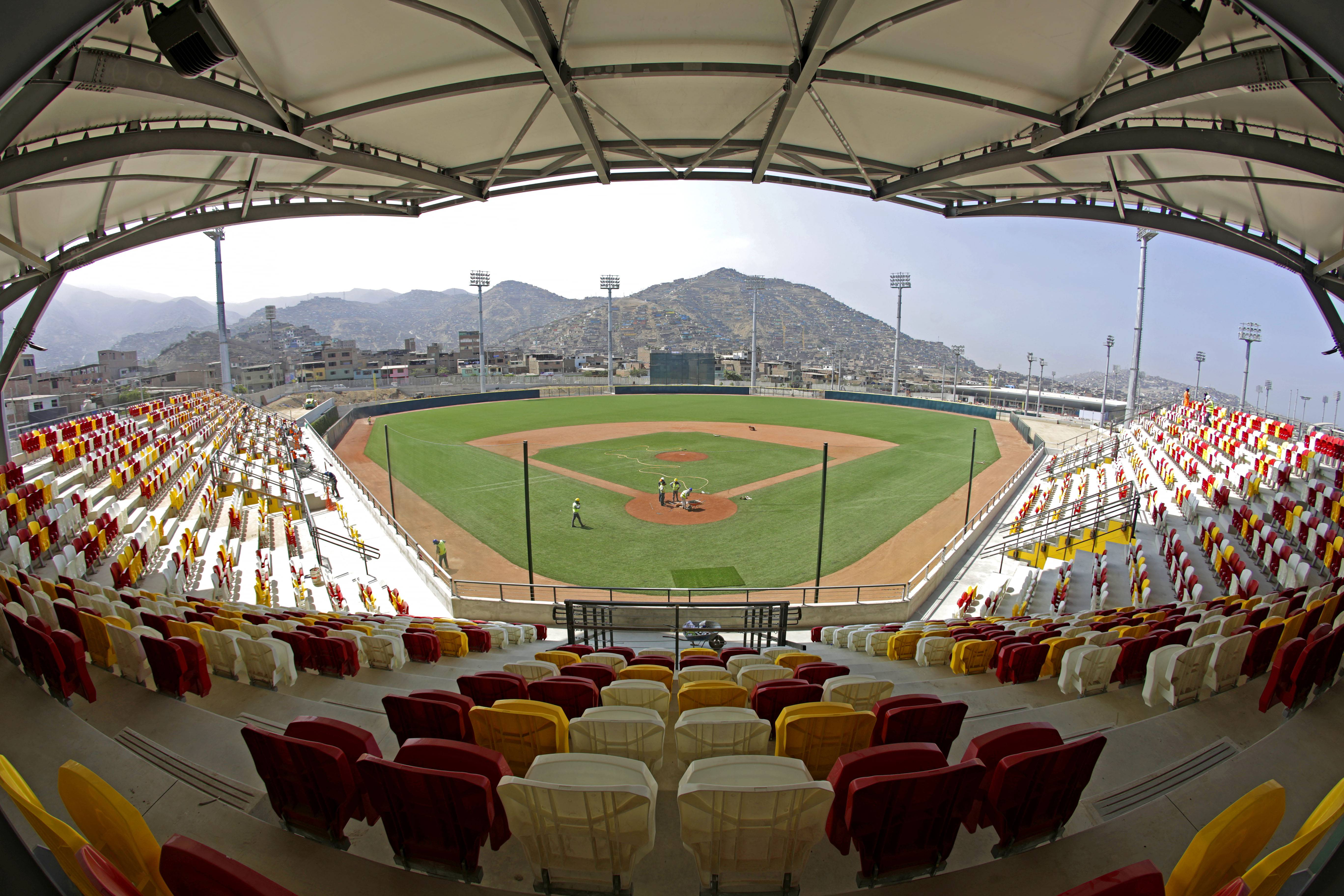

== Group stage ==
Pos	Team	Pld	W	L	RF	RA	RD	PCT	Qualification
1	Argentina	4	4	0	39	9	+30	1.000	Advanced to the Semifinals
2	Brazil	4	3	1	42	21	+21	.750	Advanced to the Semifinals
3	Ecuador	4	2	2	19	22	−3	.500	Advanced to the Semifinals
4	Peru (H)	4	1	3	30	26	+4	.250	Advanced to the Semifinals
5	Bolivia	4	0	4	3	55	−52	.000	

Source: WBSC
(H) Hosts

Date	Local time	Road team	Score	Home team	Inn.	Venue	Game duration	Attendance	Boxscore
July 24, 2022	13:00 PET	Ecuador	0–10	Argentina	5	Campo de Béisbol	1:44	50	Boxscore
July 24, 2022	18:00 PET	Peru	16–0	Bolivia	5	Campo de Béisbol	1:59	450	Boxscore
July 25, 2022	13:00 PET	Brazil	18–1	Bolivia	5	Campo de Béisbol	2:03	150	Boxscore
July 25, 2022	18:00 PET	Ecuador	4–3	Peru		Campo de Béisbol	2:41	380	Boxscore
July 26, 2022	13:20 PET	Brazil	7–4	Ecuador		Campo de Béisbol	2:44	80	Boxscore
July 26, 2022	18:00 PET	Argentina	10–4	Peru	8	Campo de Béisbol	3:38	400	Boxscore
July 27, 2022	13:00 PET	Bolivia	0–10	Argentina	5	Campo de Béisbol	1:45	50	Boxscore
July 27, 2022	18:00 PET	Peru	7–12	Brazil		Campo de Béisbol	2:49	300	Boxscore
July 28, 2022	13:00 PET	Bolivia	2–11	Ecuador		Campo de Béisbol	2:21	56	Boxscore
July 28, 2022	18:00 PET	Argentina	9–5	Brazil		Campo de Béisbol	3:02	100	Boxscore

== Knockout stage ==
=== Bracket ===
Semifinals
July 29 – Lima
Ecuador	0
Brazil	7
July 29 – Lima
Peru	2
Argentina	3

Championship
July 30 – Lima
Brazil	2
Argentina	0
Third place
July 30 – Lima
Peru	5
Ecuador	7

=== Semifinals ===
Date	Local time	Road team	Score	Home team	Inn.	Venue	Game duration	Attendance	Boxscore
July 29, 2022	13:00 PET	Ecuador	0–7	Brazil		Campo de Béisbol	1:41	50	Boxscore
July 29, 2022	18:00 PET	Peru	2–3	Argentina		Campo de Béisbol	2:12	350	Boxscore

=== Third place game ===
Date	Local time	Road team	Score	Home team	Inn.	Venue	Game duration	Attendance	Boxscore
July 30, 2022	13:00 PET	Peru	5–7	Ecuador		Campo de Béisbol	2:34	350	Boxscore

=== Championship ===
July 30, 2022 18:00 PET at Campo de Béisbol in Lima, Peru
Team	1	2	3	4	5	6	7	R	H	E
Brazil	0	0	0	0	0	2	0	2	5	1
Argentina	0	0	0	0	0	0	0	0	2	2
WP: André Rienzo (1–0) LP: Lucas Ramón (0–1); Attendance: 120; Umpires: HP: José Mansilla, 1B: Darwin Espinoza, 2B: Luis Borges, 3B: Arturo Mezarina, LF: José Duclos, RF: José Perez; Boxscore

== Statistical leaders ==
=== Batting ===
Statistic	Player	Total
AVG	(Peru) Yoza Susumu	.571
RBI	(Brazil) Felipe Burin	6
HR	(Brazil) Iago Januário	1
SB	(Argentina) Sebastián García	3
R	(Brazil) Osvaldo Carvalho	7
H	3 tied with	8

Source: South American Baseball Confederation

=== Pitching ===
Statistic	Player	Total
ERA	(Brazil) Marcelo Arai	0.00
W	(Brazil) Marcelo Arai	2
L	3 tied with	2
SV	(Brazil) Igor Januário	1
SV	(Argentina) Diego Echeverría	1
IP	(Brazil) Marcelo Arai	10.2
SO	(Peru) Juan Casas	11

Source: South American Baseball Confederation
