= Baseball at the Bolivarian Games =

The Bolivarian Games are a multinational sporting event which began in 1938. It has featured baseball 15 times, most recently in 2025.

== Results ==
Year	Final Host	Medalists		
Year	Final Host	Gold	Silver	Bronze
1938 details	(Colombia); Bogotá	Venezuela	Colombia	
1947	(Peru); Lima	Colombia	Venezuela	Peru
1951	(Venezuela); Caracas	Venezuela	Colombia	Panama
1961	(Colombia); Barranquilla	Venezuela	Colombia	Panama
1965	(Ecuador); Guayaquil	Venezuela	Colombia	Panama
1970	(Venezuela); Maracaibo	Venezuela	Colombia	Panama
1973 details	Panama City	Colombia	Venezuela	Panama
1981	(Venezuela); Barquisimeto	Venezuela	Panama	Ecuador
1985	Ecuador	Venezuela	Panama	Ecuador
1989	(Venezuela); Maracaibo	Venezuela	Panama	Colombia
2001	(Ecuador); Guayaquil	Panama	Venezuela	Colombia
2009	(Bolivia); Sucre	Panama	Venezuela	Bolivia
2013 details	(Peru); Trujillo	Panama	Venezuela	Ecuador
2017	(Colombia); Santa Marta	Colombia	Panama	Venezuela
2022 details	(Colombia); Valledupar	Dominican Republic	Colombia	Venezuela
2025 details	(Peru); Lima	Colombia	Peru	Venezuela Curaçao

== Medal table ==
Rank	Nation	Gold	Silver	Bronze	Total
1	Venezuela (VEN)	8	5	3	16
2	Colombia (COL)	4	6	2	12
3	Panama (PAN)	3	4	5	12
4	Dominican Republic (DOM)	1	0	0	1
5	Peru (PER)	0	1	1	2
6	Ecuador (ECU)	0	0	3	3
7	Bolivia (BOL)	0	0	1	1
7	Curaçao (CUW)	0	0	1	1
Totals (8 entries)		16	16	16	48
