= 2024 South American Baseball Championship =

Tournament details
- Country: Peru
- Dates: November 16 – 23
- Teams: 5
- Defending champions: Brazil

Final positions
- Champions: Argentina (7th title)
- Runners-up: Brazil
- Third place: Chile
- Fourth place: Peru

The 2024 South American Baseball Championship was the 19th edition of the South American Baseball Championship. The tournament is held in Lima, Peru from 16 to 23 November 2024.

Argentina defeated Brazil 2-1 to win the championship.

== Participating teams ==
- Argentina
- Brazil
- Chile
- Ecuador
- Peru

== Opening round ==
Pos	Team	Pld	W	L	RF	RA	PCT	GB	Qualification
1	Argentina	4	4	0	0	0	1.000	—	Advance to Semifinal
2	Brazil	4	3	1	0	0	.750	1	Advance to Semifinal
3	Chile	4	1	3	0	0	.250	3	Advance to Semifinal
4	Peru (H)	4	1	3	0	0	.250	3	Advance to Semifinal
5	Ecuador	4	1	3	0	0	.250	3	

Updated to match(es) played on incomplete. Source: WBSC Americas
(H) Hosts

Date	Local time	Road team	Score	Home team	Inn.	Venue	Game duration	Attendance	Boxscore
Nov 16, 2024	11:00	Ecuador	5–2	Chile	7	Villa María del Triunfo	2:14	120	Boxscore
Nov 16, 2024	16:00	Peru	1–2	Argentina	8	Villa María del Triunfo	2:15	350	Boxscore
Nov 17, 2024	11:00	Argentina	2–0	Brazil	7	Villa María del Triunfo	2:20	150	Boxscore
Nov 17, 2024	15:00	Chile	8–1	Peru	7	Villa María del Triunfo	2:20	450	Boxscore
Nov 18, 2024	11:00	Brazil	10–0	Chile	5	Villa María del Triunfo	2:19	120	Boxscore
Nov 18, 2024	15:00	Ecuador	0–7	Peru	7	Villa María del Triunfo	3:21	157	Boxscore
Nov 19, 2024	11:00	Peru	1–11	Brazil	6	Villa María del Triunfo	2:12	250	Boxscore
Nov 19, 2024	15:00	Argentina	6–3	Ecuador	7	Villa María del Triunfo	2:37	100	Boxscore
Nov 20, 2024	11:00	Chile	1–11	Argentina	5	Villa María del Triunfo	1:56	50	Boxscore
Nov 20, 2024	15:00	Brazil	6–3	Ecuador	7	Villa María del Triunfo	2:42	75	Boxscore

== Finals ==
=== Semifinal ===
Date	Local time	Road team	Score	Home team	Inn.	Venue	Game duration	Attendance	Boxscore
Nov 21, 2024	11:00	Chile	0–10	Brazil	5	Villa María del Triunfo	1:33	50	Boxscore
Nov 21, 2024	15:00	Peru	1–5	Argentina	7	Villa María del Triunfo	2:05	150	Boxscore

=== Bronze medal game ===
Date	Local time	Road team	Score	Home team	Inn.	Venue	Game duration	Attendance	Boxscore
Nov 23, 2024	11:00	Peru	1–6	Chile	7	Villa María del Triunfo	2:08	130	Boxscore

=== Final ===
Date	Local time	Road team	Score	Home team	Inn.	Venue	Game duration	Attendance	Boxscore
Nov 23, 2024	15:00	Brazil	1–2	Argentina	7	Villa María del Triunfo	1:57	230	Boxscore

== Final standing ==
Rank	Team
1st place, gold medalist(s)	Argentina
2nd place, silver medalist(s)	Brazil
3rd place, bronze medalist(s)	Chile
4	Peru
5	Ecuador

== External websites ==
- Official website
