= 2026 U-15 Baseball World Cup =

Tournament details
- Country: Mexico
- Dates: September 25 - October 4
- Teams: 12

Final positions
- Champions: United States (8th title)
- Runners-up: Dominican Republic
- Third place: Japan
- Fourth place: Mexico

Tournament statistics
- Games played: 50

Awards
- MVP: (United States) Noah Vrzal

The 2026 WBSC U-15 Baseball World Cup is the 7th edition of the U-15 Baseball World Cup, contested by the under-15 national teams of the member associations of WBSC. It took place in Mérida and Cancún, Mexico from 25 September to 4 October 2026.

== Host selection ==
On July 12, 2024, WBSC announced that Italy had been awarded the hosting rights for the 2025 U-15 Women's Softball World Cup. However, the Italian Baseball Softball Federation subsequently relinquished the hosting rights, and Mexico replaced Italy as the host nation.

== Format ==
The tournament will be conducted according to the following format.

First round: The twelve participating nations were drawn into two groups of 6, in which single round robin will occur. The top 3 nations from each group advances to the Super Round, while the bottom 3 nations from each group advance to the consolation round.

Placement round: The 6 nations in this round play one game against the teams they have not played yet. (example: The 4th placed team from Group A will play the bottom three teams from Group B)

Super round: The format in the super round is similar to that of the consolation round. Each team plays the top three teams from the opposing group. (example: The 1st placed team from Group B will play the top three teams from Group A) The standings for this round will include the 2 games played against the 2 other second-round qualifiers from the team's first-round group, and the 3 games played in the second round, for a total of 5 games. The 3rd and 4th-place finishers advance to the bronze-medal game, and the 1st and 2nd-place finishers advance to the gold-medal game.

Finals: The Finals consist of the Bronze Medal Game, contested by the 3rd and 4th-place finishers, and the gold-medal game, contested by the 1st and 2nd-place finishers.

== Qualification ==
| Event | | Dates | Location(s) | Berth(s) | Qualified |
|---|---|---|---|---|---|
| Host nation | | —N/a | —N/a | 1 | Mexico |
| 2025 U-15 European Championship | | 15–19 July 2025 | (Italy) Trieste | 2 | Germany; Czech Republic |
| 2025 U-15 Asian Championship | | 17–23 August 2025 | (Taiwan) Tainan | 2 | Chinese Taipei; Japan |
| 2025 U-15 Pan American Championship | South America | 30 August – 4 September 2025 | (Venezuela) Barquisimeto | 5 | Venezuela |
| 2025 U-15 Pan American Championship | Caribbean | 6–11 September 2025 | (Dominican Republic) San Antonio de Guerra | 5 | Cuba; Dominican Republic |
| 2025 U-15 Pan American Championship | Central and North America | 13–18 September 2025 | (Mexico) Juárez | 5 | United States; Nicaragua |
| 2025 U-15 Oceania Championship | | 28 November – 1 December 2025 | (Guam) Hagatna/Dededo | 1 | Australia |
| 2025 U-15 African Championship | | 5–8 December 2025 | (Kenya) Nairobi | 1 | South Africa |

== Teams ==
The following 12 teams qualified for the tournament.

| Group A | Group B |
|---|---|
| Cuba | Australia |
| Dominican Republic | Czech Republic |
| Germany | Nicaragua |
| Japan | Chinese Taipei |
| Mexico | United States |
| South Africa | Venezuela |

== Officials, Scorers, Technical Commissions ==
13 umpires, 6 scorers 4 technical commissions and 5 videos were selected by the WBSC tournament.

Umpires
| Confederation | Umpires |
|---|---|
| WBSC Americas | Diego Carlos Salas (Argentina) |
| WBSC Americas | Geneviève Gaboury (Canada) |
| WBSC Americas | Jorge Niebla (Cuba) |
| WBSC Americas | Sandley Rolland Eugenio Martina (Curaçao) |
| WBSC Americas | Edward Pinares (Dominican Republic) |
| WBSC Americas | Alan Izaguirre (Mexico) |
| WBSC Americas | Edgar Huerta (Mexico) |
| WBSC Americas | Jair Fernandez (Mexico) |
| WBSC Americas | Mayer Carrilo Gilberto (Mexico) |
| WBSC Americas | Rene Gonzalez (Panama) |
| WBSC Americas | Alex Ferra (Puerto Rico) |
| WBSC Europe | Cesar Quintana (Austria) |
| WBSC Europe | Cuauhtemoc Suarez (Spain) |

Scorers
| Confederation | Scorers |
|---|---|
| WBSC Americas | Mátias Ochoa (Argentina) |
| WBSC Americas | Javier Porras (Mexico) |
| WBSC Americas | Karina Mota (Mexico) |
| WBSC Americas | Luis Matsuo (Mexico) |
| WBSC Americas | Marcela Rodriguez (Mexico) |
| WBSC Americas | Rodrigo Almaraz (Mexico) |

Technical Commissions
| Confederation | Technical Commissions |
|---|---|
| WBSC Americas | Elpidio Serrano (Costa Rica) |
| WBSC Americas | Angel Cruz (Mexico) |
| WBSC Americas | Carlos Carpio (Mexico) |
| WBSC Americas | Peter Caliendo (United States) |

Umpire Videos
| Confederation | Umpire Videos |
|---|---|
| WBSC Asia | Toshi Kato (Japan) |
| WBSC Americas | Rafael Ramirez Cabrera (Mexico) |
| WBSC Americas | Manuel Jesus Carillo Naal (Mexico) |
| WBSC Americas | Salavdor Viera Higuera (Mexico) |
| WBSC Americas | Jairo Mendoza (Nicaragua) |

== Opening round ==
=== Group A ===
| Pos | Team | Pld | W | L | RF | RA | PCT | GB | Qualification |
|---|---|---|---|---|---|---|---|---|---|
| 1 | Dominican Republic | 5 | 4 | 1 | 64 | 11 | .800 (Note: Three-way tie decided by TQB: Dominican Republic 0.3464, Mexico 0.0000, Japna -0.3357) | — | Advance to super round |
| 2 | Mexico (H) | 5 | 4 | 1 | 23 | 12 | .800 | — | Advance to super round |
| 3 | Japan | 5 | 4 | 1 | 43 | 12 | .800 | — | Advance to super round |
| 4 | Germany | 5 | 2 | 3 | 18 | 38 | .400 | 2 | Advance to placement round |
| 5 | Cuba | 5 | 1 | 4 | 27 | 33 | .200 | 3 | Advance to placement round |
| 6 | South Africa | 5 | 0 | 5 | 7 | 76 | .000 | 4 | Advance to placement round |

Source: WBSC
(H) Hosts
Notes:

| Date | Local time | Road team | Score | Home team | Inn. | Venue | Game duration | Attendance | Boxscore |
|---|---|---|---|---|---|---|---|---|---|
| Sep 25, 2026 | 10:30 | Japan | 16–0 | South Africa | 5 | Parque Kukulcán Alamo | 2:00 | 73 | Boxscore |
| Sep 25, 2026 | 15:40 | Cuba | 4–14 | Dominican Republic | 6 | Parque Kukulcán Alamo | 2:35 | 351 | Boxscore |
| Sep 25, 2026 | 20:15 | Mexico | 5–2 | Germany | 7 | Parque Kukulcán Alamo | 2:50 | 618 | Boxscore |
| Sep 26, 2026 | 10:30 | South Africa | 0–16 | Cuba | 5 | Parque Kukulcán Alamo | 1:42 | 67 | Boxscore |
| Sep 26, 2026 | 14:30 | Germany | 0–10 | Japan | 5 | Parque Kukulcán Alamo | 1:41 | 154 | Boxscore |
| Sep 26, 2026 | 19:30 | Dominican Republic | 1–2 | Mexico | 7 | Parque Kukulcán Alamo | 2:19 | 1,619 | Boxscore |
| Sep 27, 2026 | 13:00 | Japan | 11–1 | Cuba | 5 | Parque Kukulcán Alamo | 2:32 | 197 | Boxscore |
| Sep 27, 2026 | 16:00 | Germany | 4–14 | Dominican Republic | 5 | Parque Kukulcán Alamo | 2:08 | 318 | Boxscore |
| Sep 27, 2026 | 18:30 | South Africa | 0–7 | Mexico | 7 | Parque Kukulcán Alamo | 2:11 | 1,502 | Boxscore |
| Sep 28, 2026 | 10:30 | Cuba | 2–3 | Germany | 7 | Parque Kukulcán Alamo | 2:21 | 58 | Boxscore |
| Sep 28, 2026 | 15:00 | South Africa | 0–28 | Dominican Republic | 5 | Parque Kukulcán Alamo | 1:54 | 82 | Boxscore |
| Sep 28, 2026 | 19:30 | Mexico | 4–5 | Japan | 7 | Parque Kukulcán Alamo | 2:34 | 7,220 | Boxscore |
| Sep 29, 2026 | 10:30 | Germany | 9–7 | South Africa | 7 | Parque Kukulcán Alamo | 2:17 | 63 | Boxscore |
| Sep 29, 2026 | 19:30 | Cuba | 4–5 | Mexico | 7 | Parque Kukulcán Alamo | 2:46 | 1,570 | Boxscore |
| Sep 30, 2026 | 10:00 | Dominican Republic | 7–1 | Japan | 7 | Parque Kukulcán Alamo | 2:22 | 200 | Boxscore |

=== Group B ===
| Pos | Team | Pld | W | L | RF | RA | PCT | GB | Qualification |
|---|---|---|---|---|---|---|---|---|---|
| 1 | United States | 5 | 5 | 0 | 50 | 3 | 1.000 | — | Advance to super round |
| 2 | Chinese Taipei | 5 | 4 | 1 | 28 | 10 | .800 | 1 | Advance to super round |
| 3 | Nicaragua | 5 | 3 | 2 | 40 | 29 | .600 | 2 | Advance to super round |
| 4 | Venezuela | 5 | 2 | 3 | 27 | 21 | .400 | 3 | Advance to placement round |
| 5 | Australia | 5 | 1 | 4 | 15 | 61 | .200 | 4 | Advance to placement round |
| 6 | Czech Republic | 5 | 0 | 5 | 13 | 49 | .000 | 5 | Advance to placement round |

Source: WBSC

| Date | Local time | Road team | Score | Home team | Inn. | Venue | Game duration | Attendance | Boxscore |
|---|---|---|---|---|---|---|---|---|---|
| Sep 25, 2026 | 10:30 | Nicaragua | 0–9 | Chinese Taipei | 7 | Estadio Beto Ávila | 2:29 | 50 | Boxscore |
| Sep 25, 2026 | 14:30 | Czech Republic | 2–9 | United States | 7 | Estadio Beto Ávila | 2:36 | 75 | Boxscore |
| Sep 25, 2026 | 18:30 | Australia | 1–11 | Venezuela | 5 | Estadio Beto Ávila | 2:23 | 150 | Boxscore |
| Sep 26, 2026 | 10:30 | Nicaragua | 0–10 | United States | 5 | Estadio Beto Ávila | 2:09 | 52 | Boxscore |
| Sep 26, 2026 | 14:30 | Australia | 9–2 | Czech Republic | 7 | Estadio Beto Ávila | 2:46 | 38 | Boxscore |
| Sep 26, 2026 | 18:30 | Venezuela | 0–3 | Chinese Taipei | 7 | Estadio Beto Ávila | 1:54 | 275 | Boxscore |
| Sep 27, 2026 | 10:30 | Australia | 0–23 | United States | 5 | Estadio Beto Ávila | 2:13 | 50 | Boxscore |
| Sep 27, 2026 | 14:30 | Venezuela | 5–10 | Nicaragua | 7 | Estadio Beto Ávila | 3:26 | 106 | Boxscore |
| Sep 27, 2026 | 18:30 | Chinese Taipei | 7–3 | Czech Republic | 7 | Estadio Beto Ávila | 2:32 | 73 | Boxscore |
| Sep 28, 2026 | 10:30 | Nicaragua | 17–5 | Australia | 7 | Estadio Beto Ávila | 2:49 | 33 | Boxscore |
| Sep 28, 2026 | 14:30 | Czech Republic | 6–11 | Venezuela | 7 | Estadio Beto Ávila | 2:42 | 172 | Boxscore |
| Sep 28, 2026 | 18:30 | United States | 7–1 | Chinese Taipei | 7 | Estadio Beto Ávila | 2:55 | 278 | Boxscore |
| Sep 29, 2026 | 15:30 | Czech Republic | 0–13 | Nicaragua | 5 | Estadio Beto Ávila | 1:35 | 55 | Boxscore |
| Sep 29, 2026 | 18:00 | United States | 1–0 | Venezuela | 7 | Estadio Beto Ávila | 2:26 | 279 | Boxscore |
| Sep 29, 2026 | 20:55 | Chinese Taipei | 8–0 | Australia | 7 | Estadio Beto Ávila | 2:20 | 154 | Boxscore |

== Super round ==
| Pos | Team | Pld | W | L | RF | RA | PCT | GB | Qualification |
|---|---|---|---|---|---|---|---|---|---|
| 1 | United States | 5 | 4 | 1 | 30 | 15 | .800 | — | Advance to final |
| 2 | Dominican Republic | 5 | 3 | 2 | 39 | 22 | .600 (Note: Three-way tie decided by TQB: Dominican Republic 0.3464, Mexico 0.0000, Japna -0.3357) | 1 | Advance to final |
| 3 | Mexico (H) | 5 | 3 | 2 | 25 | 19 | .600 | 1 | Advance to third-place game |
| 4 | Japan | 5 | 3 | 2 | 23 | 20 | .600 | 1 | Advance to third-place game |
| 5 | Chinese Taipei | 5 | 2 | 3 | 28 | 23 | .400 | 2 | |
| 6 | Nicaragua | 5 | 0 | 5 | 10 | 56 | .000 | 4 | |

Source: WBSC
(H) Hosts
Notes:

| Date | Local time | Road team | Score | Home team | Inn. | Venue | Game duration | Attendance | Boxscore |
|---|---|---|---|---|---|---|---|---|---|
| Oct 1, 2026 | 10:30 | Nicaragua | 1–11 | Japan | 6 | Parque Kukulcán Alamo | 2:18 | 50 | Boxscore |
| Oct 1, 2026 | 15:00 | Dominican Republic | 6–8 | United States | 7 | Parque Kukulcán Alamo | 3:12 | 362 | Boxscore |
| Oct 1, 2026 | 19:30 | Mexico | 0–10 | Chinese Taipei | 6 | Parque Kukulcán Alamo | 2:24 | 2,528 | Boxscore |
| Oct 2, 2026 | 10:30 | Nicaragua | 7–14 | Dominican Republic | 7 | Parque Kukulcán Alamo | 3:01 | 75 | Boxscore |
| Oct 2, 2026 | 15:00 | Japan | 5–4 | Chinese Taipei | 7 | Parque Kukulcán Alamo | 2:01 | 1,017 | Boxscore |
| Oct 2, 2026 | 19:30 | Mexico | 7–1 | United States | 8 | Parque Kukulcán Alamo | 3:37 | 2,898 | Boxscore |
| Oct 3, 2026 | 10:30 | Chinese Taipei | 4–11 | Dominican Republic | 7 | Parque Kukulcán Alamo | 2:47 | 127 | Boxscore |
| Oct 3, 2026 | 15:00 | Japan | 1–4 | United States | 7 | Parque Kukulcán Alamo | 2:07 | 691 | Boxscore |
| Oct 3, 2026 | 19:30 | Nicaragua | 2–12 | Mexico | 5 | Parque Kukulcán Alamo | 2:02 | 5,399 | Boxscore |

== Placement round ==
| Pos | Team | Pld | W | L | RF | RA | PCT | GB |
|---|---|---|---|---|---|---|---|---|
| 1 | Venezuela | 5 | 5 | 0 | 43 | 12 | 1.000 | — |
| 2 | Australia | 5 | 3 | 2 | 25 | 21 | .600 (Note: Head-to-head result: Australia 9–2 Czech Republic) | 2 |
| 3 | Czech Republic | 5 | 3 | 2 | 27 | 25 | .600 | 2 |
| 4 | Germany | 5 | 2 | 3 | 17 | 27 | .400 (Note: Head-to-head result: Germany 3–2 Cuba) | 3 |
| 5 | Cuba | 5 | 2 | 3 | 28 | 15 | .400 | 3 |
| 6 | South Africa | 5 | 0 | 5 | 10 | 50 | .000 | 5 |

Source: WBSC
Notes:

| Date | Local time | Road team | Score | Home team | Inn. | Venue | Game duration | Attendance | Boxscore |
|---|---|---|---|---|---|---|---|---|---|
| Oct 1, 2026 | 10:30 | Czech Republic | 8–2 | South Africa | 7 | Estadio Beto Ávila | 1:57 | 50 | Boxscore |
| Oct 1, 2026 | 14:30 | Australia | 2–3 | Cuba | 7 | Estadio Beto Ávila | 2:29 | 81 | Boxscore |
| Oct 1, 2026 | 18:30 | Venezuela | 4–1 | Germany | 7 | Estadio Beto Ávila | 2:14 | 57 | Boxscore |
| Oct 2, 2026 | 10:30 | Czech Republic | 5–3 | Cuba | 7 | Estadio Beto Ávila | 3:06 | 32 | Boxscore |
| Oct 2, 2026 | 14:30 | South Africa | 0–12 | Venezuela | 5 | Estadio Beto Ávila | 1:42 | 22 | Boxscore |
| Oct 2, 2026 | 18:30 | Australia | 8–4 | Germany | 7 | Estadio Beto Ávila | 2:15 | | Boxscore |
| Oct 3, 2026 | 10:30 | Cuba | 4–5 | Venezuela | 8 | Estadio Beto Ávila | 2:55 | 35 | Boxscore |
| Oct 3, 2026 | 14:30 | Czech Republic | 6–0 | Germany | 7 | Estadio Beto Ávila | 2:23 | 34 | Boxscore |
| Oct 3, 2026 | 18:30 | South Africa | 1–5 | Australia | 7 | Estadio Beto Ávila | 1:47 | | Boxscore |

== Final round ==
=== Third-place game ===
| Date | Local time | Road team | Score | Home team | Inn. | Venue | Game duration | Attendance | Boxscore |
|---|---|---|---|---|---|---|---|---|---|
| Oct 4, 2026 | 11:00 | Japan | 8–6 | Mexico | 7 | Parque Kukulcán Alamo | 2:34 | 3,116 | Boxscore |

=== Final ===
| Date | Local time | Road team | Score | Home team | Inn. | Venue | Game duration | Attendance | Boxscore |
|---|---|---|---|---|---|---|---|---|---|
| Oct 4, 2026 | 17:00 | Dominican Republic | 4–5 | United States | 7 | Parque Kukulcán Alamo | 3:27 | 1,824 | Boxscore |

== Final standings ==
| Rk | Team | W | L |
|---|---|---|---|
| 1st place, gold medalist(s) | United States | 8 | 1 |
Lost in final
| 2nd place, silver medalist(s) | Dominican Republic | 6 | 3 |
Failed to qualify for the final
| 3rd place, bronze medalist(s) | Japan | 7 | 2 |
Lost in 3rd place game
| 4 | Mexico | 6 | 3 |
Failed to qualify for the final round
| 5 | Chinese Taipei | 5 | 3 |
| 6 | Nicaragua | 3 | 5 |
Failed to qualify for the super round
| 7 | Venezuela | 5 | 3 |
| 8 | Australia | 3 | 5 |
| 9 | Czech Republic | 3 | 5 |
| 10 | Germany | 2 | 6 |
| 11 | Cuba | 2 | 6 |
| 12 | South Africa | 0 | 8 |
