= Baseball at the 2013 Bolivarian Games =

Baseball, for the 2013 Bolivarian Games, took place from 17 November to 24 November 2013.

== Medalists ==
Event	Gold	Silver	Bronze
Men's tournament	Panama; Alberto Acosta; Max Ayarza; Jorge Bishop; Luis Castillo; Ramon Castillo; Jean Corpas; Angel Cuan; Julio Denis; Javier Dominguez; David Gonzalez; Saul Gonzalez; Luis Machuca; Gilberto Mendez; Eliecer Navarro; Jeffer Patiño; Carlos Javier Quiroz; Nelson Robledo; Concepcion Rodriguez; Eduardo Thomas; Victor Vasquez; Nodier Vega; Isaias Velasquez	Venezuela; Edgar Jose Bruzual; Jhonny Caraballo; Rodolfo Jose Cardona; Josmar Carreño; Juan Esteban Colmenarez; Juan Jose Fuentes; Alexis Jose Fumero; Jose Ramon Gomez; Emigdio Alexander Guzman; Jorge Raul Guzman; Douglas Alberto Landaeta; Hebert Antonio Lara; Jesus Jose Mogollon; Carlos Enrique Mory; Edixon Muro; Alberto Odreman; Gabriel Purroy; Fernando Quijada; Jesus Alberto Reyes; Arturo Gustavo Rivas; Rafael Eduardo Rivas; Yonathan Wladimir Sivira	Ecuador; Jorge Alberto Briones; Jhunior Cordero; Rafael Escobar; Samuel Felman; Luiggy Florencia; Sebastian Gonzalez; Adrian Lara; Carlos Mancheno; Nelson Xavier Mieles; Stefano Jose Navas; Edgar Oswaldo Powin; Joel Antonio Pulgar; Carlos Denir Quirola; Josue David Rosario; Jaime Andres Torres; Felipe Rodolfo Valle; Gustavo Andres Varas; Miguel Angel Veliz; Alfredo Orlando Venegas

== Participating teams ==
- Bolivia
- Ecuador
- Guatemala
- Panama
- Peru
- Venezuela
