= Argentina national baseball team =

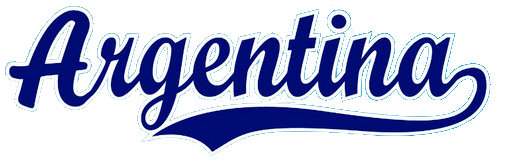

Information
- Country: Argentina
- Federation: Argentine Baseball Federation
- Confederation: WBSC Americas
- Manager: Rolando Arnedo

WBSC ranking
- Current: 33 (26 March 2026)
- Highest: 21 (2 times; latest in December 2018)
- Lowest: 34 (3 times; latest in September 2025)

Uniforms
Home	Away

Pan American Games
- Appearances: 3 (first in 1951)
- Best result: 6th (1995)

The Argentina national baseball team (Spanish: Selección de béisbol de Argentina) also known as "The Gauchos" is the national baseball team of Argentina. The team represents Argentina in international competitions. They are nicknamed "The Gauchos."

Baseball was introduced in Argentina in 1888 with the establishment of the "Buenos Aires Baseball Club" (BABC), formed mainly by U.S. expatriate. The BAFC remained at least for 30 years, but despite its effort to spread the practise of the sport in Argentina, baseball did not gain much popularity among the Argentine people.

In 1925, the Argentine Baseball Association was established to organize and regulate the sport in the country. Three decades later, when the Liga Argentina had already been in existence, operating since 1932 and eventually becoming the "Federación Argentina de Béisbol", the sport had already spread with several competitions in Buenos Aires, and also the provinces of Santa Fe and Salta. Nevertheless, baseball never attracted the crowds predicted in 1917.

The Venezolean diaspora to Argentina helped the sport spread in the country, as part of improving the level of the local league.

The national team has won the South American Baseball Championship seven times, most recently in 2024 after defeating Brazil 2–1. Their previous victories were in 1959, 2004, 2011, 2012, 2013, and 2018. Thanks to this victory, Argentina's baseball team qualified for the 2019 Pan American Games, the first time the team has ever qualified.

In 2022, Argentina participated for the first time in the World Baseball Classic qualification.

== Results and fixtures ==
The following is a list of professional baseball match results currently active in the latest version of the WBSC World Rankings, as well as any future matches that have been scheduled.

Legend

Win Lose Void or postponed Fixture

=== 2022 ===
Copa Sudamérica GS	July 24	Argentina	10–0 (F/5)	Ecuador	Villa María del Triunfo, Peru
Copa Sudamérica GS		WP: Guido Monis	Boxscore	LP: Israel Saldarriaga	Attendance: 50

Copa Sudamérica GS	July 26	Argentina	10–4 (F/8)	Peru	Villa María del Triunfo, Peru
Copa Sudamérica GS		WP: Diego Echeverría	Boxscore	LP: Matías Miyagusuku	Attendance: 400

Copa Sudamérica GS	July 27	Argentina	10–0 (F/5)	Bolivia	Villa María del Triunfo, Peru
Copa Sudamérica GS		WP: Fernando Cancelare	Boxscore	LP: Quiroga, Ronal	Attendance: 50

Copa Sudamérica GS	July 28	Argentina	9–5	Brazil	Villa María del Triunfo, Peru
Copa Sudamérica GS		WP: Franco Pérez	Boxscore	LP: Pedro Oliveira	Attendance: 100

Copa Sudamérica SF	July 29	Argentina	3–2	Peru	Villa María del Triunfo, Peru
Copa Sudamérica SF		WP: Federico Robles	Boxscore	LP: Jonathan Farías	Attendance: 350

Copa Sudamérica F	July 30	Argentina	0–2	Brazil	Villa María del Triunfo, Peru
Copa Sudamérica F		LP: Lucas Ramón	Boxscore	WP: André Rienzo	Attendance: 120

World Baseball Classic Q	September 30	Pakistan	4–7	Argentina	Rod Carew Stadium, Panama
World Baseball Classic Q	19:00 ET	LP: Omar Arif	Boxscore	WP: Lucas Ramon; Sv: Franco Perez (1)	Attendance: 466; Umpires: HP: Lisa Turbitt. 1B: Frantisek Pribyl. 2B: Dane Poncsak. 3B: Michael Ulloa

World Baseball Classic Q	October 1	Argentina	0–11 (F/7)	Panama	Rod Carew Stadium, Panama
World Baseball Classic Q	19:00 CT	LP: Guido Monis	Boxscore	WP: Humberto Mejía; HR: Jose Ramos (1)	Attendance: 5,314; Umpires: HP: Michael Ulloa. 1B: Lisa Turbitt. 2B: Frantisek Pribyl. 3B: Mark Stewart

World Baseball Classic Q	October 2	New Zealand	1–4	Argentina	Rod Carew Stadium, Panama
World Baseball Classic Q	19:00 CT	LP: Elliot Johnstone; HR: Chayton Krauss (1)	Boxscore	WP: Federico Robles; Sv: Jose Mendoza (1)	Attendance: 193; Umpires: HP: Frantisek Pribyl. 1B: Michael Ulloa. 2B: Mark Stewart. 3B: Austin Jones

World Baseball Classic Q	October 4	Argentina	5–6	Nicaragua	Rod Carew Stadium, Panama
World Baseball Classic Q	12:00 CT	LP: Franco Perez; HR: Lucas Stalman (1)	Boxscore	WP: Berman Espinoza; Sv: Roniel Raudes	Attendance: 185; Umpires: HP: Mark Stewart. 1B: Michael Ulloa. 2B: Dane Poncsak. 3B: Juan Manuel Rodriguez

=== 2019 ===
Pan American Games GS	July 29	Argentina	0–10 (F/8)	Canada	Lima, Peru
Pan American Games GS	15:05 PET		Boxscore		Attendance: 2,355

Pan American Games GS	July 30	Colombia	4–2	Argentina	Lima, Peru
Pan American Games GS	15:05 PET		Boxscore		Attendance: 1,560

Pan American Games GS	July 31	Cuba	10–0 (F/7)	Argentina	Lima, Peru
Pan American Games GS	15:05 PET		Boxscore		Attendance: 987

Pan American Games 7th	August 2	Peru	1–20 (F/5)	Argentina	Lima, Peru
Pan American Games 7th	10:05 PET		Boxscore		Attendance: 1,125

=== 2018 ===
Copa Sudamérica GS	April 14	Argentina	17–0 (F/6)	Bolivia	Buenos Aires, Argentina

Copa Sudamérica GS	April 15	Argentina	3–2	Brazil	Buenos Aires, Argentina

Copa Sudamérica GS	April 16	Chile	1–9	Argentina	Buenos Aires, Argentina

Copa Sudamérica GS	April 18	Argentina	11–1	Chile	Buenos Aires, Argentina

Copa Sudamérica GS	April 19	Brazil	8–6	Argentina	Buenos Aires, Argentina

Copa Sudamérica GS	April 20	Bolivia	Void	Argentina	Buenos Aires, Argentina

Copa Sudamérica F	April 21	Argentina	7–1	Brazil	Buenos Aires, Argentina

== Tournament results ==
=== World Baseball Classic ===
World Baseball Classic record							Qualification record			
Year	Round	Position	W	L	RS	RA	W	L	RS	RA
2006	did not enter						No qualifiers held			
2009	did not enter						No qualifiers held			
2013	did not enter						did not enter			
2017	did not enter						did not enter			
2023	did not qualify						2	2	16	22
2026	did not enter						did not enter			
Total	-	0/6	-	-	-	-	2	2	16	22

Argentina World Baseball Classic Qualifiers record
Opponent	Tournaments met	W-L record	Largest victory		Largest defeat		Current streak
Opponent	Tournaments met	W-L record	Score	Tournament	Score	Tournament	Current streak
New Zealand	1	1-0	4–1	Panama 2023	–		W1
Nicaragua	1	0-1	–		6–5	Panama 2023	L1
Pakistan	1	1-0	7–4	Panama 2023	–		W1
Panama	1	0-1	–		11–0 (F/7)	Panama 2023	L1
Overall	1	2–2	Against PAK		Against PAN		L1
Overall	1	2–2	7–4	Panama 2023	11–0 (F/7)	Panama 2023	L1

Tournament	Appearances	Best Result
South America Baseball Championship	18 (first in 1957)	1st (7 times)
Pan American Games	1 (first in 2019)	7th

== Roster ==
Argentina roster – 2023 World Baseball Classic Qualifier
Players		Coaches
Pitchers: 18 Thomas Cuenca; 49 Diego Echeverría; 28 Juan Elorza; 22 Carlos Gimenez; 29 Eric Ma; 77 Jose Mendoza; 16 Guido Monis; 11 Franco Pérez; 21 Lucas Ramón; 25 Kevin Riello; 55 Federico Robles	Catchers: 1 José Gerez; 2 Lucas Nakandakare; Infielders: 42 Jacinto Cipriota; 14 Pedro Figueras; 27 Andres Kim; 5 Lucas Stalman; 20 Exequiel Talevi; 66 Agustín Tissera; Outfielders: 35 Sebastián García; 7 Julian Pedrouzo; 23 Matías Robles; 43 Eduardo Zurbriggen	Manager: 24 Rolando Arnedo; Coaches: 15 Gabriel Sansó (Bench); 13 Marcelo Alfonsin (Pitching); 9 Nicolás Solari (First Base); 10 Eduardo Capdevila (Third Base); 50 Federico Bisbal (Analytics)
