= 2025 U-15 Pan American Baseball Championship =

Tournament details
- Countries: Dominican Republic; Mexico; Venezuela
- Dates: 30 August – 4 September (South America); 6–11 September (Caribbean); 13–18 September (Central and North America)
- Teams: 14

The 2025 U-15 Pan American Baseball Championship was the 7th edition of the U-15 Pan American Baseball Championship, organised by Americas' governing baseball body, the WBSC Americas. The championship was held across three regions: Juárez, Mexico; Santo Domingo, Dominican Republic; and Barquisimeto, Venezuela. The winner of each regional tournament earned one spot in the 2026 U-15 Baseball World Cup, while two teams among the three regional runners-up also qualified for the tournament.

== Participating teams ==
Central and North America	Caribbean	South America
Costa Rica; Mexico; Nicaragua; Panama; United States	Aruba; Cuba; Dominican Republic; Puerto Rico	Brazil; Colombia; Ecuador; Peru; Venezuela

== South America ==
South America tournament was contested in Barquisimeto from 30 August – 4 September 2025.

=== Opening round ===
Pos	Team	Pld	W	L	RF	RA	PCT	GB	Qualification
1	Venezuela	4	4	0	55	16	1.000	—	Advance to final
2	Colombia	4	3	1	47	26	.750	1	Advance to final
3	Brazil	4	2	2	44	33	.500	2	Advance to third-place game
4	Peru	4	1	3	11	48	.250	3	Advance to third-place game
5	Ecuador	4	0	4	12	46	.000	4	

Source: WBSC Americas

Date	Local time	Road team	Score	Home team	Inn.	Venue	Game duration	Attendance	Boxscore
Aug 30 , 2025	10:00	Brazil	14–19	Colombia	7	Estadio Daniel Chino Canónico	3:30	200	Boxscore
Aug 30 , 2025	15:00	Venezuela	16–4	Peru	5	Estadio Daniel Chino Canónico	1:55	200	Boxscore
Aug 31 , 2025	10:00	Brazil	13–3	Ecuador	6	Estadio Daniel Chino Canónico	2:50	150	Boxscore
Aug 31 , 2025	14:00	Colombia	1–11	Venezuela	5	Estadio Daniel Chino Canónico	1:55	250	Boxscore
Sep 1, 2025	10:00	Colombia	17–1	Peru	5	Estadio Antonio Herrera Gutiérrez	2:08	100	Boxscore
Sep 1, 2025	14:00	Ecuador	6–18	Venezuela	5	Estadio Antonio Herrera Gutiérrez	2:20	250	Boxscore
Sep 2, 2025	10:00	Peru	5–3	Ecuador	7	Estadio Antonio Herrera Gutiérrez	2:30	200	Boxscore
Sep 2, 2025	14:00	Venezuela	10–5	Brazil	7	Estadio Antonio Herrera Gutiérrez	2:20	220	Boxscore
Sep 3, 2025	10:00	Peru	1–12	Brazil	5	Estadio Antonio Herrera Gutiérrez	1:25	100	Boxscore
Sep 3, 2025	14:00	Ecuador	0–10	Colombia	5	Estadio Antonio Herrera Gutiérrez	1:30	100	Boxscore

=== Third-place game ===
Date	Local time	Road team	Score	Home team	Inn.	Venue	Game duration	Attendance	Boxscore
Sep 4, 2025	10:00	Peru	7–11	Brazil	7	Estadio Antonio Herrera Gutiérrez	2:40	150	Boxscore

=== Fianl ===
Date	Local time	Road team	Score	Home team	Inn.	Venue	Game duration	Attendance	Boxscore
Sep 4, 2025	14:00	Colombia	3–15	Venezuela	7	Estadio Antonio Herrera Gutiérrez	2:45	400	Boxscore

== Caribbean ==
Caribbean tournament was contested in Santo Domingo from 6–11 September 2025.

=== Round robin ===
Pos	Team	Pld	W	L	RF	RA	PCT	GB
1	Cuba	6	4	2	54	37	.667	—
2	Dominican Republic	6	4	2	41	36	.667	—
3	Puerto Rico	6	3	3	42	41	.500	1
4	Aruba	6	1	5	38	61	.167	3

Source: WBSC Americas

Date	Local time	Road team	Score	Home team	Inn.	Venue	Game duration	Attendance	Boxscore
Sep 6, 2025	9:00	Puerto Rico	13–3	Aruba	5	Complejo Deportivo IPL Academy - Stadium 1	2:30		Boxscore
Sep 6, 2025	13:00	Cuba	8–9	Dominican Republic	7	Complejo Deportivo IPL Academy - Stadium 1	3:10		Boxscore
Sep 7, 2025	9:00	Cuba	2–8	Puerto Rico	7	Complejo Deportivo IPL Academy - Stadium 1	2:36		Boxscore
Sep 7, 2025	13:00	Aruba	5–11	Dominican Republic	7	Complejo Deportivo IPL Academy - Stadium 1			Boxscore
Sep 8, 2025	9:00	Aruba	5–8	Cuba	7	Complejo Deportivo IPL Academy - Stadium 1			Boxscore
Sep 8, 2025	14:30	Dominican Republic	8–4	Puerto Rico	7	Complejo Deportivo IPL Academy - Stadium 1	2:39		Boxscore
Sep 9, 2025	10:00	Aruba	11–12	Puerto Rico	7	Complejo Deportivo IPL Academy - Stadium 1			Boxscore
Sep 9, 2025	14:30	Dominican Republic	5–10	Cuba	7	Complejo Deportivo IPL Academy - Stadium 1			Boxscore
Sep 10, 2025	10:00	Puerto Rico	2–13	Cuba	7	Complejo Deportivo IPL Academy - Stadium 1			Boxscore
Sep 10, 2025	14:30	Dominican Republic	4–6	Aruba	7	Complejo Deportivo IPL Academy - Stadium 1			Boxscore
Sep 11, 2025	10:00	Cuba	13–8	Aruba	7	Complejo Deportivo IPL Academy - Stadium 1			Boxscore
Sep 11, 2025	14:30	Puerto Rico	3–4	Dominican Republic	7	Complejo Deportivo IPL Academy - Stadium 1			Boxscore

== Central and North America ==
Central and North America tournament was contested in Ciudad Juárez from 13–18 September 2025.

=== Opening round ===
Pos	Team	Pld	W	L	RF	RA	PCT	GB	Qualification
1	United States	4	4	0	42	6	1.000	—	Advance to final
2	Nicaragua	4	3	1	32	15	.750	1	Advance to final
3	Mexico	4	2	2	29	18	.500	2	Advance to third-place game
4	Panama	4	1	3	16	25	.250	3	Advance to third-place game
5	Costa Rica	4	0	4	2	57	.000	4	

Source: WBSC Americas

Date	Local time	Road team	Score	Home team	Inn.	Venue	Game duration	Attendance	Boxscore
Sep 13, 2025	15:00	United States	4–2	Panama	7	Estadio Juárez Vive	3:30	250	Boxscore
Sep 14, 2025	15:00	United States	11–4	Nicaragua	8	Estadio Juárez Vive	3:16	350	Boxscore
Sep 14, 2025	19:00	Panama	1–8	Mexico	7	Estadio Juárez Vive	2:24	500	Boxscore
Sep 15, 2025	15:00	Costa Rica	1–11	Panama	5	Estadio Juárez Vive	1:55	100	Boxscore
Sep 15, 2025	19:00	Nicaragua	6–2	Mexico	7	Estadio Juárez Vive	2:45	250	Boxscore
Sep 16, 2025	10:00	Mexico	19–1	Costa Rica	5	Estadio Juárez Vive		50	Boxscore
Sep 16, 2025	15:00	Costa Rica	0–17	United States	5	Estadio Juárez Vive	1:48	50	Boxscore
Sep 16, 2025	19:00	Panama	2–12	Nicaragua	5	Estadio Juárez Vive	2:15	75	Boxscore
Sep 17, 2025	15:00	Nicaragua	10–0	Costa Rica	6	Estadio Juárez Vive	1:56	150	Boxscore
Sep 18, 2025	10:00	Mexico	0–10	United States	6	Estadio Juárez Vive	2:42	1,100	Boxscore

=== Third-place game ===
Date	Local time	Road team	Score	Home team	Inn.	Venue	Game duration	Attendance	Boxscore
Sep 18, 2025	15:00		–			Estadio Juárez Vive			Canceled

=== Fianl ===
Date	Local time	Road team	Score	Home team	Inn.	Venue	Game duration	Attendance	Boxscore
Sep 18, 2025	19:00		–			Estadio Juárez Vive			Canceled

== Final standing ==
=== South America ===
Rank	Team
1st place, gold medalist(s)	Venezuela
2nd place, silver medalist(s)	Colombia
3rd place, bronze medalist(s)	Brazil
4	Peru
5	Ecuador

=== Caribbean ===
Rank	Team
1st place, gold medalist(s)	Cuba
2nd place, silver medalist(s)	Dominican Republic
3rd place, bronze medalist(s)	Puerto Rico
4	Aruba

=== Central and North America ===
Rank	Team
1st place, gold medalist(s)	United States
2nd place, silver medalist(s)	Nicaragua
3rd place, bronze medalist(s)	Mexico
4	Panama
5	Costa Rica

Qualified for the 2026 U-15 World Cup

Venezuela, Cuba, and the United States secured berths in the 2026 U-15 Baseball World Cup by winning their respective championships. WBSC announced that Nicaragua and the Dominican Republic had also qualified.

== External websites ==
- Official website (South America)
- Official website (Caribbean)
- Official website (Central and North America)
