= Baseball at the 2019 Pan American Games =

- Baseball pictogram for the 2019 games
- Venues: Villa María del Triunfo; Lima Province, Peru
- Dates: July 29 – August 4, 2019
- No. of events: 1 (1 men)
- Competitors: 192 from 8 nations

Medalists
Gold medal	Puerto Rico
Silver medal	Canada
Bronze medal	Nicaragua

Baseball at the 2019 Pan American Games was held from July 27 to August 4. The venue for the competition was the baseball stadium located at the Villa María del Triunfo cluster. The tournament was part of the 2019 edition of the Pan American Games, hosted by Lima, Peru.

A total of eight men's teams (each consisting of up to 24 players) competed. Thus, a total of 192 athletes were scheduled to compete. After having been contested for the first time in 2015, women's baseball was dropped for this edition.

Puerto Rico won the gold medal game over Canada, 6–1, and were undefeated during the tournament. Nicaragua finished in third place.

The top finishers in the event that were not already qualified for the 2019 WBSC Premier12 were awarded the final one or two spots (depending on other qualification paths) in the Americas Qualifying Event for the 2020 Summer Olympics in Tokyo. Nicaragua and Colombia so qualified for the Americas Qualifying Event via their third-place and fourth-place finishes.

== Medalists ==
Event	Gold	Silver	Bronze
Men's tournament	Puerto Rico: Fernando Cabrera; Freddie Cabrera; Luis Cintrón; Fernando Cruz; Jeffrey Domínguez; Bryan Escanio; Edwin Gómez; Jay González; Andrés López; Kevin Luciano; Brahiam Maldonado; Iván Maldonado; Miguel Martínez; Ozzie Martínez; Luis Mateo; Efraín Nieves; Jorge Padilla; José Rivera; César Rivera; Wilfredo Rodríguez; Orlando Román; Ramesis Rosa; Giovanni Soto; Kevin Torres	Canada: Ben Abram; Phillippe Aumont; Jordan Balazovic; Eric Cerantola; Michael Crouse; Wes Darvill; RJ Freure; Tyson Gillies; Dustin Houle; Edouard Julien; Ryan Kellogg; Jordan Lennerton; Chris Leroux; Jonathan Malo; Will McAffer; Dustin Molleken; Connor Panas; Tristan Pompey; Jordan Procyshen; Jasvir Rakkar; Scott Richmond; Evan Rutckyj; Rene Tosoni; Eric Wood	Nicaragua: Benjamín Alegría; Luis Alen; Isaac Benard; Jimmy Bermúdez; Dwight Britton; Jorge Bucardo; Wilber Bucardo; Jilton Calderón; Darrel Campbell; Ofilio Castro; Berman Espinoza; Rafael Estrada; Fidencio Flores; Jesús Garrido; Ernesto Glasgon; Elías Gutiérrez; Wilton López; Gustavo Martínez; Marvin Martínez; Edgard Montiel; Javier Robles; Junior Téllez; Norlando Valle; Wuillians Vasquez

== Participating nations ==
A total of 8 countries qualified baseball teams.

- Argentina (24 athletes)
- Canada (24)
- Colombia (24)
- Cuba (24)
- Dominican Republic (24)
- Nicaragua (24)
- Peru (24)
- Puerto Rico (24)

== Qualification ==
Eight men's teams qualified to compete at the games in each tournament. The host nation (Peru) qualified in each tournament, along with winner of the South American Championship, the top two teams at the 2018 Central American and Caribbean Games and the top four teams at the Pan American Qualification tournament.

Event	Dates	Location	Vacancies	Qualified
Host Nation	—N/a	—N/a	1	Peru
2018 South American Championships	April 15–21	(Argentina) Buenos Aires	1	Argentina
2018 Central American and Caribbean Games	July 20–29	(Colombia) Barranquilla	2	Puerto Rico; Cuba
2019 Pan American Games Qualifier	January 29 – February 3	(Brazil) Ibiúna-São Paulo	4	Dominican Republic; Colombia; Nicaragua; Canada
Total			8	

== Competition format ==
The eight teams were split into groups of four, with the top two teams in each group advancing to the "super round". The third placed team in each group played for fifth place, while fourth in each group played for seventh. In the super round, each team played the two teams from the other group, with the result against the team from its group carried over. The top two in this round played for gold, with the other two teams playing for bronze.

== Results ==
All times are Peru Standard Time (UTC−5)

=== Preliminary round ===
==== Group A ====
	GP	W	L	RS	RA	DIFF
Puerto Rico	3	3	0	13	5	+8
Nicaragua	3	2	1	17	9	+8
Dominican Republic	3	1	2	13	9	+4
Peru	3	0	3	4	24	−14

Qualified for the Super round

July 29; 19:05	Dominican Republic	10–3	Peru	Baseball Stadium, Lima; Attendance: 2,798
July 29; 19:05		Boxscore		Baseball Stadium, Lima; Attendance: 2,798

July 30; 10:05	Puerto Rico	7–3	Nicaragua	Baseball Stadium, Lima; Attendance: 1,059
July 30; 10:05		Boxscore		Baseball Stadium, Lima; Attendance: 1,059

July 31; 10:05	Nicaragua	4–2	Dominican Republic	Baseball Stadium, Lima; Attendance: 577
July 31; 10:05		Boxscore		Baseball Stadium, Lima; Attendance: 577

July 31; 19:05	Puerto Rico	4–1	Peru	Baseball Stadium, Lima; Attendance: 2,850
July 31; 19:05		Boxscore		Baseball Stadium, Lima; Attendance: 2,850

August 1; 15:05	Dominican Republic	1–2 (F/10)	Puerto Rico	Baseball Stadium, Lima; Attendance: 1,780
August 1; 15:05		Boxscore		Baseball Stadium, Lima; Attendance: 1,780

August 1; 19:05	Peru	0–10 (F/7)	Nicaragua	Baseball Stadium, Lima; Attendance: 1,994
August 1; 19:05		Boxscore		Baseball Stadium, Lima; Attendance: 1,994

==== Group B ====
	GP	W	L	RS	RA	DIFF
Canada	3	3	0	28	9	+19
Colombia	3	2	1	13	13	0
Cuba	3	1	2	17	14	+3
Argentina	3	0	3	2	24	−22

Qualified for the Super round

July 29; 10:05	Cuba	1–6	Colombia	Baseball Stadium, Lima; Attendance: 2,456
July 29; 10:05		Boxscore		Baseball Stadium, Lima; Attendance: 2,456

July 29; 15:05	Argentina	0–10 (F/8)	Canada	Baseball Stadium, Lima; Attendance: 2,355
July 29; 15:05		Boxscore		Baseball Stadium, Lima; Attendance: 2,355

July 30; 15:05	Colombia	4–2	Argentina	Baseball Stadium, Lima; Attendance: 1,560
July 30; 15:05		Boxscore		Baseball Stadium, Lima; Attendance: 1,560

July 30; 19:05	Canada	8–6	Cuba	Baseball Stadium, Lima; Attendance: 1,123
July 30; 19:05		Boxscore		Baseball Stadium, Lima; Attendance: 1,123

July 31; 15:05	Cuba	10–0 (F/7)	Argentina	Baseball Stadium, Lima; Attendance: 987
July 31; 15:05		Boxscore		Baseball Stadium, Lima; Attendance: 987

August 1; 10:05	Colombia	3–10	Canada	Baseball Stadium, Lima; Attendance: N/A
August 1; 10:05		Boxscore		Baseball Stadium, Lima; Attendance: N/A

=== Placement matches ===
==== Seventh place match ====
August 2; 10:05	Peru	1–20 (F/5)	Argentina	Baseball Stadium, Lima; Attendance: 1,125
August 2; 10:05		Boxscore		Baseball Stadium, Lima; Attendance: 1,125

==== Fifth place match ====
August 3; 10:05	Dominican Republic	10–9 (F/10)	Cuba	Baseball Stadium, Lima; Attendance: 2,415
August 3; 10:05		Boxscore		Baseball Stadium, Lima; Attendance: 2,415

=== Super round ===
	GP	W	L	RS	RA	DIFF
Puerto Rico	3	3	0	17	9	+8
Canada	3	2	1	25	11	+14
Colombia	3	1	2	15	13	+2
Nicaragua	3	0	3	4	28	−24

August 2; 15:05	Puerto Rico	8–5	Canada	Baseball Stadium, Lima; Attendance: 2,100
August 2; 15:05		Boxscore		Baseball Stadium, Lima; Attendance: 2,100

August 2; 19:05	Nicaragua	1–11 (F/7)	Colombia	Baseball Stadium, Lima; Attendance: 1,513
August 2; 19:05		Boxscore		Baseball Stadium, Lima; Attendance: 1,513

August 3; 15:05	Nicaragua	0–10 (F/7)	Canada	Baseball Stadium, Lima; Attendance: 1,979
August 3; 15:05		Boxscore		Baseball Stadium, Lima; Attendance: 1,979

August 3; 19:05	Puerto Rico	2–1	Colombia	Baseball Stadium, Lima; Attendance: 2,313
August 3; 19:05		Boxscore		Baseball Stadium, Lima; Attendance: 2,313

=== Medal matches ===
==== Bronze medal match ====
August 4; 11:05	Colombia	0–6	Nicaragua (bronze)	Baseball Stadium, Lima; Attendance: N/A
August 4; 11:05		Boxscore		Baseball Stadium, Lima; Attendance: N/A

==== Gold medal match ====
August 4; 18:05	(gold) Puerto Rico	6–1	Canada (silver)	Baseball Stadium, Lima; Attendance: N/A
August 4; 18:05		Boxscore		Baseball Stadium, Lima; Attendance: N/A

2019 Pan American Games winners

Puerto Rico
1st title

== Final standings ==
Rank	Team	Record
1	Puerto Rico	6–0
2	Canada	4–2
3	Nicaragua	3–3
4	Colombia	3–3
5	Dominican Republic	2–2
6	Cuba	1–3
7	Argentina	1–3
8	Peru	0–4

== See also ==
- Baseball at the 2020 Summer Olympics
