= Beto Avila =

Beto Avila may refer to:

- Bobby Ávila (1924–2004), Mexican baseball player
- Beto Avila (soccer) (born 2000), American soccer player
- Estadio de Béisbol Beto Ávila, baseball venue in Mexico
- Estadio Universitario Beto Ávila, baseball venue in Mexico
