= WBSC Americas =

Sports governing body in the Americas

- Type: Sport organization
- Region served: Americas
- Members: 57 member associations
- Parent organization: World Baseball Softball Confederation
- Website: www.wbscamericas.org

WBSC Americas, formerly known as Pan American Baseball Confederation (COPABE, Spanish: Confederación Panamericana de Béisbol, Portuguese: Confederação Pan-Americana de Beisebol, French: Confédération panaméricaine de baseball) is the governing body of baseball and softball within the Americas.

== History ==
Talks of the need of a baseball confederation in the Americas sparked with the founding of the Confederation of European Baseball back in the 1950s, although it was not until 1984, during the World Cup played in Cuba, that 12 countries of the Americas finally voted in favor of a formation of a confederation.

The first ever Confederación Panamericana de Béisbol (COPABE) executive meeting was held in March 1985, and 11 countries participated in its first ever Congress on March 15. The Congress saw the election of Oswaldo Matias Flores (Cuba) as the first president of the organization.

On October 5, 1987, the first Pan American Championship was played (Cuba won the tournament). The day after the final game of the tournament was held, the Congress elected Edwin Zerpa Pizzorno (Venezuela) as the next president of the organization.

In the late 1980s and early 1990s COPABE concentrated on developing tournaments at the youth level all over the Americas.

== Members ==
=== Baseball ===
Code	Association	National teams	Founded	Membership	IOC member	Note
ARG	Argentina	(M, W)	1960	Full	Yes	
ARU	Aruba	(M, W)	1950	Full	Yes	
BAH	(The Bahamas) Bahamas	(M, W)	1954	Full	Yes	
BOL	Bolivia	(M, W)		Full	Yes	
BRA	Brazil	(M, W)	1990	Full	Yes	
IVB	British Virgin Islands	(M, W)		Full	Yes	
CAN	Canada	(M, W)	1964	Full	Yes	
CHI	Chile	(M, W)	1954	Full	Yes	
COL	Colombia	(M, W)	1938	Full	Yes	
CRC	Costa Rica	(M, W)	1975	Full	Yes	
CUB	Cuba	(M, W)	1938	Full	Yes	
CUW	Curaçao	(M, W)	1934	Provisional	No	(Note: Constituent country of the Netherlands.)
DOM	Dominican Republic	(M, W)	1966	Full	Yes	
ECU	Ecuador	(M, W)	1945	Full	Yes	
ESA	El Salvador	(M, W)		Full	Yes	
GUA	Guatemala	(M, W)		Full	Yes	
GUY	Guyana	(M, W)	2012	Full	Yes	
HAI	Haiti	(M, W)	2013	Full	Yes	
HON	Honduras	(M, W)		Full	Yes	
JAM	Jamaica	(M, W)		Full	Yes	
MEX	Mexico	(M, W)	1987	Full	Yes	
NCA	Nicaragua	(M, W)	1950	Full	Yes	
PAN	Panama	(M, W)	1944	Full	Yes	
PER	Peru	(M, W)	1926	Full	Yes	
PUR	Puerto Rico	(M, W)	1970	Full	Yes	
SXM	Sint Maarten	(M, W)		Provisional	No	
TTO	Trinidad and Tobago	(M, W)		Full	Yes	
USA	United States	(M, W)	1978	Full	Yes	
ISV	United States Virgin Islands	(M, W)		Full	Yes	
VEN	Venezuela	(M, W)	1952	Full	Yes	

=== Softball ===
Code	Association	National teams	Founded	Membership	IOC member	Note
ARG	Argentina	(M, W)	1960	Full	Yes	
ARU	Aruba	(M, W)		Full	Yes	
BAH	(The Bahamas) Bahamas	(M, W)	1972	Full	Yes	
BIZ	Belize	(M, W)		Full	Yes	
BOL	Bolivia	(M, W)		Full	Yes	
BRA	Brazil	(M, W)		Full	Yes	
IVB	British Virgin Islands	(M, W)	1952	Full	Yes	
CAN	Canada	(M, W)	1965	Full	Yes	
CAY	Cayman Islands	(M, W)		Full	Yes	
CHI	Chile	(M, W)	1954	Full	Yes	
COL	Colombia	(M, W)	1968	Full	Yes	
CRC	Costa Rica	(M, W)	2011	Full	Yes	
CUB	Cuba	(M, W)	1980	Full	Yes	
CUW	Curaçao	(M, W)	1952	Provisional	No	
DOM	Dominican Republic	(M, W)	1966	Full	Yes	
ECU	Ecuador	(M, W)	2014	Full	Yes	
ESA	El Salvador	(M, W)	1980	Full	Yes	
GUA	Guatemala	(M, W)	1990	Full	Yes	
HAI	Haiti	(M, W)	2013	Full	Yes	
HON	Honduras	(M, W)		Full	Yes	
JAM	Jamaica	(M, W)	2016	Full	Yes	
MEX	Mexico	(M, W)	1985	Full	Yes	
NCA	Nicaragua	(M, W)	2006	Full	Yes	
PAN	Panama	(M, W)	1965	Full	Yes	
PER	Peru	(M, W)	1981	Full	Yes	
PUR	Puerto Rico	(M, W)		Full	Yes	
TCA	Turks and Caicos Islands	(M, W)		Provisional	No	(Note: Overseas Territory of the United Kingdom.)
USA	United States	(M, W)	1933	Full	Yes	
ISV	United States Virgin Islands	(M, W)		Full	Yes	
URU	Uruguay	(M, W)		Full	Yes	
VEN	Venezuela	(M, W)		Full	Yes	

== WBSC World Rankings ==
=== Baseball ===
WBSC Men's Rankings (as of 18 November 2026)
Americas*	WBSC	+/-	National Team	Points
1	3	▲2	Venezuela	4360
2	4	▼1	United States	4293
3	6	▲1	Puerto Rico	3320
4	7	▲2	Panama	2863
5	9	▼1	Dominican Republic	2779
6	10	▼4	Mexico	2758
7	12	Steady	Cuba	2090
8	14	▲1	Nicaragua	1776
9	15	▼1	Colombia	1492
10	20	▼2	Canada	862
11	22	▼1	Brazil	670
12	30	▲1	Curaçao	228
13	34	Steady	Peru	183
14	35	Steady	Argentina	175
15	38	▲1	Bahamas	128
16	39	▼2	Costa Rica	114
17	40	▲1	U.S. Virgin Islands	112
18	41	▼1	Guatemala	106
19	43	Steady	Honduras	97
20	49	Steady	Chile	71
21	52	Steady	Ecuador	58
22	58	▼4	El Salvador	41
23	59	Steady	Aruba	39
24	64	Steady	Sint Maarten	25
*Local rankings based on WBSC ranking points

WBSC Women's Rankings (as of 9 September 2026)
Americas*	WBSC	+/-	National Team	Points
1	2	Steady	United States	1428
2	3	Steady	Canada	1365
3	4	▲1	Venezuela	1248
4	6	▼2	Mexico	990
5	10	▼3	Cuba	535
6	12	▼3	Puerto Rico	342
7	25	Steady	Argentina	31
*Local rankings based on WBSC ranking points

=== Softball ===
WBSC Men's Softball Rankings (as of 14 May 2026)
Americas*	WBSC	+/-	National Team	Points
1	2	Steady	Venezuela	2797
2	3	▲1	Canada	2347
3	4	▲1	United States	2262
4	5	▼2	Argentina	2146
5	6	▲2	Mexico	1955
6	10	▲1	Dominican Republic	1027
7	12	▲1	Colombia	796
8	13	▼1	Guatemala	660
9	17	▲5	Panama	308
10	21	Steady	Cuba	210
11	25	▲9	Peru	115
12	26	Steady	Puerto Rico	107
13	32	▼8	Honduras	58
14	33	Steady	Aruba	43
15	34	▼3	Nicaragua	41
16	36	▼8	Costa Rica	25
17	39	▼4	El Salvador	10
18	40	▼3	Belize	9
*Local rankings based on WBSC ranking points

WBSC Women's Rankings (as of 21 October 2026)
Americas*	WBSC	+/-	National Team	Points
1	2	Steady	United States	3486
2	3	Steady	Puerto Rico	3002
3	4	Steady	Canada	2728
4	6	Steady	Mexico	2251
5	12	Steady	Venezuela	1071
6	15	Steady	Cuba	799
7	16	Steady	Brazil	758
8	17	Steady	Peru	701
9	25	▲1	Colombia	386
10	27	Steady	Dominican Republic	340
11	31	▼1	Argentina	289
12	33	▼1	U.S. Virgin Islands	279
13	35	Steady	El Salvador	257
14	41	Steady	Guatemala	159
15	46	Steady	Chile	103
16	52	Steady	Aruba	48
17	56	Steady	Panama	19
18	59	Steady	Bolivia	15
19	61	Steady	Nicaragua	14
20	64	Steady	Curaçao	10
21	66	Steady	Belize	8
22	68	Steady	Honduras	3
23	69	Steady	British Virgin Islands	2
*Local rankings based on WBSC ranking points

=== Baseball5 ===
WBSC Baseball5 Rankings (as of 22 September 2026)
Americas*	WBSC	+/-	National Team	Points
1	1	Steady	Cuba	5827
2	5	Steady	Mexico	3843
3	7	Steady	Venezuela	3324
4	23	▼1	Puerto Rico	908
5	33	Steady	Peru	503
6	34	Steady	Argentina	500
6	34	Steady	Dominican Republic	500
8	52	▼1	United States	250
9	65	Steady	Canada	100
10	72	Steady	Bolivia	17
11	77	Steady	Jamaica	9
*Local rankings based on WBSC ranking points

=== Historical leaders ===
Highest Ranked Americas member in the WBSC Rankings

Men's baseball

Women's baseball

Men's softball

Women's softball

== Competitions ==
=== Baseball ===
Men's

- U-23 Pan American Baseball Championship
- U-18 Pan American Baseball Championship
- U-15 Pan American Baseball Championship
- U-12 Pan American Baseball Championship
- U-10 Pan American Baseball Championship

Women's

- Pan American Women's Baseball Championship

=== Softball ===
Men's

- Men's Softball Pan American Championship
- U-23 Men's Softball Pan American Championship
- U-18 Men's Softball Pan American Championship

Women's

- Women's Softball Pan American Championship
- U-18 Women's Softball Pan American Championship
- U-15 Women's Softball Pan American Championship

=== Baseball5 ===
- Baseball5 Pan American Championship

=== Current title holders ===
Competition		Year	Host country	Champions	Title	Runners-up	Next edition	Dates
Baseball
Americas Baseball Cup				To be determined		To be determined		
Central American Baseball Cup		2026	Guatemala	Guatemala		El Salvador		
Caribbean Baseball Cup		2025	Bahamas	Curaçao		Bahamas		
South American Baseball Championship		2024	Peru	Argentina		Brazil		
U-23 Pan American Baseball Championship	Caribbean; Central and North America	2025	Panama	Panama		Puerto Rico		
U-23 Pan American Baseball Championship	South America	2025	Peru	Venezuela		Brazil		
U-18 Pan American Baseball Championship		2026	Dominican Republic	United States		Venezuela	2028	
U-15 Pan American Baseball Championship	Central and North America	2025	Mexico	United States		Nicaragua		
U-15 Pan American Baseball Championship	Caribbean	2025	Dominican Republic	Cuba		Dominican Republic		
U-15 Pan American Baseball Championship	South America	2025	Venezuela	Venezuela		Colombia		
U-12 Pan American Baseball Championship		2024	Panama	United States		Dominican Republic	2026	20-27 November
U-10 Pan American Baseball Championship		2025	Panama	Venezuela - Azul		Venezuela - Blanco		
Pan American Women's Baseball Championship		2025	Venezuela	Venezuela		Mexico		
Softball
Men's Softball Pan American Championship		2026	Colombia	Mexico	1st	Argentina		
U-23 Men's Softball Pan American Championship		2025	Argentina	Argentina; Mexico				
U-18 Men's Softball Pan American Championship		2025	Argentina	Argentina	1st	Mexico		
Women's Softball Pan American Championship		2025	Colombia	Canada	1st	Puerto Rico		
U-18 Women's Softball Pan American Championship		2024	Colombia	Puerto Rico	1st	Canada		
U-15 Women's Softball Pan American Championship		2025	Mexico	United States	2nd	Mexico		
Baseball5
Baseball5 Pan American Championship		2026	Venezuela	Venezuela	1st	Cuba	2028	
Youth Baseball5 Pan American Championship		2026	Venezuela	Cuba	1st	Venezuela		

== See also ==
- World Baseball Softball Confederation
- Baseball at the Central American and Caribbean Games
- Baseball at the Pan American Games
- Baseball at the 2010 South American Games
- 2008 Copa América (baseball)
- Baseball awards § Americas
- Latin American Series
- Caribbean Series
- South American Baseball Championship
