= 2024 Baseball5 Pan American Championship =

Tournament details
- Country: Venezuela
- Dates: 27–30 June
- Teams: 4

Final positions
- Champions: Cuba (1st title)
- Runner-up: Mexico
- Third place: Venezuela
- Fourth place: Puerto Rico

The 2024 Baseball5 Pan American Championship was the first edition of the Baseball5 Pan American Championship, a Baseball5 tournament organized by WBSC Americas. The championship was held from 27 to 30 June 2024, in the Domo Bolivariano in Barquisimeto, Venezuela and was contested between four national teams.

Cuba went undefeated to win the tournament, finishing the opening round 6–0 and defeating Mexico in the championship game. Venezuela, that lost the semifinals against Mexico, claimed the bronze medal. The three teams qualified for the 2024 Baseball5 World Cup in Hong Kong.

== Venue ==
(Venezuela) Barquisimeto
Domo Bolivariano
Capacity: 10,000
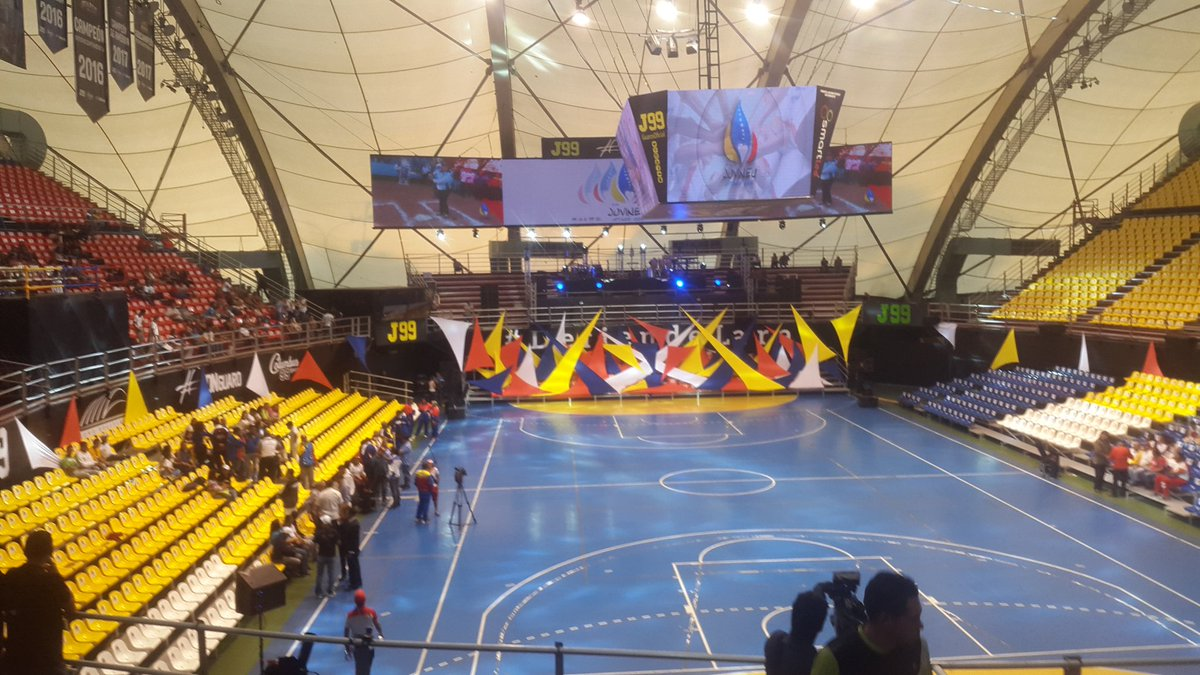

== Opening round ==
=== Group A ===
Pos	Team	Pld	W	L	RF	RA	RD	PCT	GB	Qualification
1	Cuba	6	6	0	130	24	+106	1.000	—	Advance to Final
2	Venezuela (H)	6	3	3	58	41	+17	.500	3	Advance to Semifinal
3	Mexico	6	2	4	51	96	−45	.333	4	Advance to Semifinal
4	Puerto Rico	6	1	5	32	110	−78	.167	5	

Source: WBSC Americas
(H) Hosts

27 June; 17:00 (UTC–4)	Mexico	0–2	Cuba	Domo Bolivariano, Barquisimeto, Venezuela
27 June; 17:00 (UTC–4)		Boxscore		Domo Bolivariano, Barquisimeto, Venezuela

27 June; 18:00 (UTC–4)	Puerto Rico	0–2	Venezuela	Domo Bolivariano, Barquisimeto, Venezuela
27 June; 18:00 (UTC–4)		Boxscore		Domo Bolivariano, Barquisimeto, Venezuela

27 June; 20:30 (UTC–4)	Venezuela	0–2	Cuba	Domo Bolivariano, Barquisimeto, Venezuela
27 June; 20:30 (UTC–4)		Boxscore		Domo Bolivariano, Barquisimeto, Venezuela

27 June; 21:30 (UTC–4)	Puerto Rico	2–0	Mexico	Domo Bolivariano, Barquisimeto, Venezuela
27 June; 21:30 (UTC–4)		Boxscore		Domo Bolivariano, Barquisimeto, Venezuela

28 June; 16:00 (UTC–4)	Cuba	2–0	Puerto Rico	Domo Bolivariano, Barquisimeto, Venezuela
28 June; 16:00 (UTC–4)		Boxscore		Domo Bolivariano, Barquisimeto, Venezuela

28 June; 17:00 (UTC–4)	Venezuela	0–2	Mexico	Domo Bolivariano, Barquisimeto, Venezuela
28 June; 17:00 (UTC–4)		Boxscore		Domo Bolivariano, Barquisimeto, Venezuela

28 June; 19:30 (UTC–4)	Cuba	2–1	Mexico	Domo Bolivariano, Barquisimeto, Venezuela
28 June; 19:30 (UTC–4)		Boxscore		Domo Bolivariano, Barquisimeto, Venezuela

28 June; 2O:30 (UTC–4)	Venezuela	2–0	Puerto Rico	Domo Bolivariano, Barquisimeto, Venezuela
28 June; 2O:30 (UTC–4)		Boxscore		Domo Bolivariano, Barquisimeto, Venezuela

29 June; 15:30 (UTC–4)	Cuba	2–1	Venezuela	Domo Bolivariano, Barquisimeto, Venezuela
29 June; 15:30 (UTC–4)		Boxscore		Domo Bolivariano, Barquisimeto, Venezuela

29 June; 16:30 (UTC–4)	Mexico	2–1	Puerto Rico	Domo Bolivariano, Barquisimeto, Venezuela
29 June; 16:30 (UTC–4)		Boxscore		Domo Bolivariano, Barquisimeto, Venezuela

29 June; 19:30 (UTC–4)	Mexico	0–2	Venezuela	Domo Bolivariano, Barquisimeto, Venezuela
29 June; 19:30 (UTC–4)		Boxscore		Domo Bolivariano, Barquisimeto, Venezuela

29 June; 20:30 (UTC–4)	Puerto Rico	0–2	Cuba	Domo Bolivariano, Barquisimeto, Venezuela
29 June; 20:30 (UTC–4)		Boxscore		Domo Bolivariano, Barquisimeto, Venezuela

== Knockout stage ==
Semifinal					Final
					1	Cuba	8	6
2	Venezuela	5	2	2	3	Mexico	1	4
3	Mexico	2	8	3

== Final standings ==
Pos	Team	W	L	Qualification
Gold medal	Cuba	7	0	Qualified for 2024 Baseball5 World Cup
Silver medal	Mexico	3	5	Qualified for 2024 Baseball5 World Cup
Bronze medal	Venezuela	3	4	Qualified for 2024 Baseball5 World Cup
4	Puerto Rico	1	5	

== Awards ==
Tournament Awards
Award	Player
Most Valuable Female Player	(Cuba) Chaquira Azpiazu
Most Valuable Male Player	(Cuba) Briandy Molina
Best Coach	(Cuba) Pablo Terry

Americas Team
Player
(Cuba) Briandy Molina
(Mexico) Paulina Ojeda
(Cuba) Chaquira Azpiazu
(Venezuela) Luis Márques
(Mexico) Luis Bencomo
