= Baseball at the 2010 South American Games =

- Venue: Estadio Atanasio Girardot
- Dates: March 22–27

Baseball at the 2010 South American Games in Medellín, Colombia, was held from March 22 to March 27. All games were played at Estadio Atanasio Girardot.

== Medal summary ==
=== Medalists ===
Gold	Silver	Bronze
Venezuela	Colombia	Argentina

== Results ==
=== First round ===
March 22, 2010	Venezuela	5 – 4	Netherlands Antilles

March 22, 2010	Argentina	2 – 5	Colombia

March 23, 2010	Netherlands Antilles	10 – 5	Argentina

March 23, 2010	Colombia	3 – 11	Venezuela

March 24, 2010	Argentina	4 – 16	Venezuela

March 24, 2010	Netherlands Antilles	3 – 4	Colombia

==== Standings ====
Team	W	L	R	RA	PCT
Venezuela	3	0	32	11	1.000
Colombia	2	1	12	16	.667
Netherlands Antilles	1	2	17	14	.333
Argentina	0	3	11	31	.000

=== Final Round ===
March 26, 2010	Venezuela	11 – 1	Argentina

March 26, 2010	Colombia	3 – 2	Netherlands Antilles

March 27, 2010	Argentina	8 – 6	Netherlands Antilles

March 27, 2010	Venezuela	10 – 6	Colombia

== See also ==
- Baseball awards#Americas
- America Baseball Cup
- Baseball at the Pan American Games
- Baseball at the Central American and Caribbean Games
