= Baseball at the 2022 Bolivarian Games =

Football competitions at the 2022 Bolivarian Games

- Venue: Estadio Erasmo Camacho Calamar
- Dates: 29 June – 5 July 2022
- Competitors: 96 from 4 nations
- Teams: 4

Champions
- Men: Dominican Republic

Baseball competitions at the 2022 Bolivarian Games were held from 29 June to 5 July 2022 at the Estadio Erasmo Camacho Calamar in Valledupar. The tournament marked the first appearance of the Dominican Republic at the Bolivarian Games; Panama, which had won three of the past four tournaments, did not return, potentially because they were preparing for 2023 World Baseball Classic qualifiers in September.

== Final standings ==
Final Standings
Pos.	Team	W	L	RS	RA	RD
1	Dominican Republic	5	1	46	18	28
2 (Note: Though Colombia and Venezuela finished with the same record in the tournament (3–3) and against each other (1–1), Colombia finished with a better run differential.)	Colombia	3	3	33	24	9
3	Venezuela	3	3	28	37	-9
4	Peru	1	5	11	39	-28

== Medalists ==
Event	Gold	Silver	Bronze
Men's tournament	Dominican Republic; Trinitty Berroa; Rando Moreno; Samuel Burgos; Wandherley del Rosario; Ricardo Andujar; Winston Lopez; Wildert Pujols; Victor Luna; Luis Guzman; Edwin Adon; Marcos Frias; Alfredo Fígaro; Josuel Chalas; Darlin German; Stanley Javier; Nicolas Debora; Mario Garman; Luis Espinal; Randy Francisco; Isaac Silva; Frangely Morel	Colombia; Gaspar Palacio; Edilberto Mendoza; Jose Felix Altamiranda; Keiner Manrique; Sergio Palacio; Rafael Romero; Carlos de Avila; Edwin Pertuz; Jhon Peluffo; Jesus Sepulveda; Carlos Diaz; Yelzer Marrugo; Luis Enrique Castro; Gerson Jimenez; Bryan Niňo; Jonathan Lozada; Jesus Posso; Randy Cuentas; Sugar Ray Marimón; Eduin Villa; Luis Angel Arrieta	Venezuela; Fernando Kelli; Jose Gregorio Garcia; Anderson Melendez; Gilmael Troya; Jose Manuel PAstrano; Yhostin Chirinos; Javin Gorrin; Beicker Mendoza; Gabriel Acosta; Yoandy Rea; Keith Arevalo; Angel Leon; Juan Daniel Bidau; Victor Aguilar; Jose Gabriel Ortega; Anderson Hidalgo; Frank Lopez; Alejandro Lubo; Junell Ledezma; Jesus Tona; Oscar Abreu; Neljuk Castellano; Ronny Rincones

== Results ==
June 29, 2022; 19:06	Dominican Republic	6–0 (F/7)	Peru	Estadio Erasmo Camacho Calamar; Attendance: 3,120; Umpires: Enrique Mondol (COL)
June 29, 2022; 19:06	WP: Samuel Burgos		WP: Ken Ishihara	Estadio Erasmo Camacho Calamar; Attendance: 3,120; Umpires: Enrique Mondol (COL)

June 30, 2022; 14:04	Venezuela	9–2 (F/7)	Dominican Republic	Estadio Erasmo Camacho Calamar; Umpires: Peter Montalvo (COL)
June 30, 2022; 14:04	WP: Victor Aguilar		LP: Alfredo Fígaro	Estadio Erasmo Camacho Calamar; Umpires: Peter Montalvo (COL)

June 30, 2022; 19:02	Peru	0–8 (F/7)	Colombia	Estadio Erasmo Camacho Calamar; Attendance: 3,200; Umpires: Delfin Roa (DOM)
June 30, 2022; 19:02	LP: Édgar Paredes		WP: Randy Cuentas	Estadio Erasmo Camacho Calamar; Attendance: 3,200; Umpires: Delfin Roa (DOM)
June 30, 2022; 19:02			HR: Jesus Posso	Estadio Erasmo Camacho Calamar; Attendance: 3,200; Umpires: Delfin Roa (DOM)

July 1, 2022; 13:59	Venezuela	4–5 (F/7)	Peru	Estadio Erasmo Camacho Calamar; Attendance: 2,450; Umpires: Efraín Castro (COL)
July 1, 2022; 13:59	LP: Ronny Rincones		WP: Jonathan Farias	Estadio Erasmo Camacho Calamar; Attendance: 2,450; Umpires: Efraín Castro (COL)

'

July 1, 2022; 18:54	Dominican Republic	11–4 (F/7)	Colombia	Estadio Erasmo Camacho Calamar; Attendance: 1,003; Umpires: Edward Pacheco (VEN)
July 1, 2022; 18:54	WP: Mario Garman		WP: José Félix Altamiranda	Estadio Erasmo Camacho Calamar; Attendance: 1,003; Umpires: Edward Pacheco (VEN)
July 1, 2022; 18:54			HR: Jonathan Lozada	Estadio Erasmo Camacho Calamar; Attendance: 1,003; Umpires: Edward Pacheco (VEN)

July 2, 2022; 14:04	Peru	1–7 (F/7)	Dominican Republic	Estadio Erasmo Camacho Calamar; Attendance: 345; Umpires: Enrique Mondol (COL)
July 2, 2022; 14:04	LP: Édgar Paredes		WP: Omarly Luna	Estadio Erasmo Camacho Calamar; Attendance: 345; Umpires: Enrique Mondol (COL)
July 2, 2022; 14:04			HR: Stanley Javier	Estadio Erasmo Camacho Calamar; Attendance: 345; Umpires: Enrique Mondol (COL)

July 2, 2022; 18:53	Colombia	10–0 (F/7)	Venezuela	Estadio Erasmo Camacho Calamar; Umpires: Delfin Perez (DOM)
July 2, 2022; 18:53	WP: Yeizer Marrugo		LP: Frank Lopez	Estadio Erasmo Camacho Calamar; Umpires: Delfin Perez (DOM)

July 3, 2022; 14:00	Dominican Republic	14–2 (F/7)	Venezuela	Estadio Erasmo Camacho Calamar; Attendance: 342; Umpires: Peter Montalvo (COL)
July 3, 2022; 14:00	WP: Samuel Burgos		LP: Oscar Abreu	Estadio Erasmo Camacho Calamar; Attendance: 342; Umpires: Peter Montalvo (COL)
July 3, 2022; 14:00	HR: Stanley Javier; Darlin German; Wildert Pujols		HR: José Gregorio Garcia	Estadio Erasmo Camacho Calamar; Attendance: 342; Umpires: Peter Montalvo (COL)

July 3, 2022; 18:43	Colombia	8–0 (F/7)	Peru	Estadio Erasmo Camacho Calamar; Umpires: Eduardo Pacheco (VEN)
July 3, 2022; 18:43	WP: Gabriel Hernandez		LP: Marco Castellano	Estadio Erasmo Camacho Calamar; Umpires: Eduardo Pacheco (VEN)

July 4, 2022; 14:02	Peru	5–6 (F/7)	Venezuela	Estadio Erasmo Camacho Calamar; Umpires: Enrique Mondol (COL)
July 4, 2022; 14:02	LP: Ken Ishihara		WP: Javier Gorrin; Sv: Frank Lopez	Estadio Erasmo Camacho Calamar; Umpires: Enrique Mondol (COL)
July 4, 2022; 14:02	HR: Rider Zevallos		HR: José Gregorio Garcia; Beicker Mendoza	Estadio Erasmo Camacho Calamar; Umpires: Enrique Mondol (COL)

July 4, 2022; 18:57	Colombia	2–6 (F/7)	Dominican Republic	Estadio Erasmo Camacho Calamar; Umpires: Eduardo Pacheco (VEN)
July 4, 2022; 18:57	LP: Randy Cuentas		WP: Alfredo Fígaro	Estadio Erasmo Camacho Calamar; Umpires: Eduardo Pacheco (VEN)

July 5, 2022; 13:40	Venezuela	7–1 (F/7)	Colombia	Estadio Erasmo Camacho Calamar; Umpires: Delfin Perez (DOM)
July 5, 2022; 13:40	WP: Gabriel Acosta		LP: Carlos de Avila	Estadio Erasmo Camacho Calamar; Umpires: Delfin Perez (DOM)
July 5, 2022; 13:40	HR: José Gregorio Garcia			Estadio Erasmo Camacho Calamar; Umpires: Delfin Perez (DOM)

== Statistical leaders ==
Batting leaders
Statistic	Name	Total
Batting average	(Dominican Republic) Stanley Javier	.571
Slugging percentage (Note: Minimum of 2.7 plate appearances per game)	(Venezuela) José Gregorio Garcia	1.056
On-base percentage	(Dominican Republic) Stanley Javier	.571
Hits	(Dominican Republic) Stanley Javier	12
Runs	(Venezuela) Juan Daniel Bidau	7
Home runs	(Venezuela) José Gregorio Garcia	4
Runs batted in	(Dominican Republic) Wildert Pujols	9
Stolen bases	(Venezuela) Juan Daniel Bidau	4

Pitching leaders
Statistic	Name	Total
Wins	2 tied with (Note: Samuel Burgos and Javier Gorrin)	2
Earned run average	3 tied with (Note: Gabriel Hernandez, Omarly Luna, and Yeizer Marrugo)	0.00
Innings pitched	(Dominican Republic) Samuel Burgos	12.0
Strikeouts	(Dominican Republic) Samuel Burgos	18
