= Baseball5 Pan American Championship =

- Sport: Baseball5
- Founded: 2024; 2 years ago
- No. of teams: 4
- Continent: Americas
- Most recent champion: Venezuela (1st title)
- Most titles: Cuba; Venezuela (1 title)
- 2026 Baseball5 Pan American Championship

The Baseball5 Pan American Championship is the main Baseball5 tournament in the Americas, governed by WBSC Americas. The top three teams qualify to the Baseball5 World Cup.

== History ==
Mexico, a member of WBSC Americas, hosted the 2022 Baseball5 World Cup, the inaugural tournament of the Baseball5 World Cup. Since there was no qualifying event for the Americas, Cuba and Venezuela were invited by the World Baseball Softball Confederation to join Mexico in the championship as the three teams representing the Americas.

The inaugural Baseball5 Pan American Championship was contested from 27 to 30 June 2024 in the Domo Bolivariano in Barquisimeto, Venezuela with four teams taking part: hosts Venezuela, Cuba, Mexico and Puerto Rico, who made its international debut in Baseball5 competition.

Cuba won the 2024 Baseball5 Pan American Championship undefeated, with a 6–0 opening round record, and beating Mexico 2 sets to 0 in the final. Venezuela, that lost the semifinals against Mexico, was awarded the bronze medal. The three teams qualified for the 2024 Baseball5 World Cup in Hong Kong.

== Results ==
Year	Host	Final			Semifinals
Year	Host	Champions	Score	Runners-up	Third place
2024; Details	(Venezuela); Barquisimeto	Cuba	2–0	Mexico	Venezuela
2026; Details	(Venezuela); Barquisimeto	Venezuela	2–1	Cuba	Mexico

=== Medal table ===
Rank	Nation	Gold	Silver	Bronze	Total
1	Cuba	1	1	0	2
2	Venezuela	1	0	1	2
3	Mexico	0	1	1	2
Totals (3 entries)		2	2	2	6

=== Participating teams ===
Teams	(Venezuela) 2024	(Venezuela) 2026	Years
Cuba	1st	2nd	1
Mexico	2nd	3rd	1
Puerto Rico	4th	4th	1
Venezuela	3rd	1st	1
Total	4	4	

== See also ==
- Baseball5 World Cup
- Youth Baseball5 World Cup
- Baseball5 African Championship
- Baseball5 Asia Cup
- Baseball5 European Championship
