= Evan Rutckyj =

Canadian baseball player (born 1992)

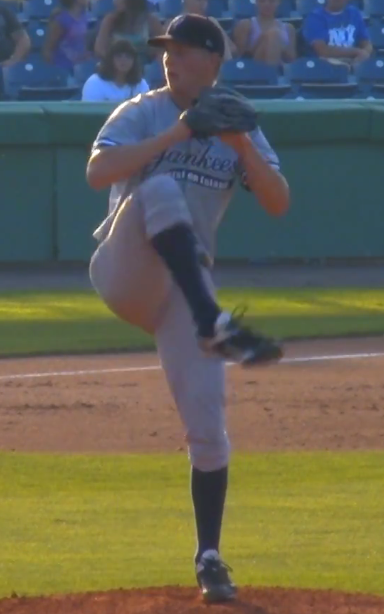
- Rutckyj with the Staten Island Yankees in 2012

Free agent
- Pitcher
- Born: January 31, 1992 (age 34); Windsor, Ontario, Canada
- Bats: Right Throws: Left
- Stats at Baseball Reference
Medals
Men's baseball
Representing Canada
Pan American Games
Gold medal – first place	2015 Toronto	Team
Silver medal – second place	2019 Lima	Team

Evan P. Rutckyj (born January 31, 1992) is a Canadian professional baseball pitcher who is a free agent. He was drafted by the New York Yankees in the 16th round of the 2010 Major League Baseball draft.

== Career ==
=== New York Yankees ===
Rutckyj was drafted by the New York Yankees in the 16th round of the 2010 Major League Baseball draft out of St. Joseph's Catholic High School in Windsor, Ontario, Canada. Rutckyj spent the 2010 and 2011 seasons with the rookie-level Gulf Coast League Yankees. He split the 2012 season with the Low Single-A Staten Island Yankees and the Single-A Charleston River Dogs, registering an 8-8 record and 3.91 ERA with 86 strikeouts in 101 1/3 innings of work. He remained in Charleston for all of 2013, recording a 5.03 ERA and 10-9 record in 118 innings. Rutckyj split the 2014 season between Charleston and the High-A Tampa Yankees, pitching to an accumulative 5-3 record and 3.81 ERA with 58 strikeouts in 49 2/3 innings pitched. In 2015, Rutckyj spent time with Tampa and the Double-A Trenton Thunder, pitching to a 2.63 ERA with 82 strikeouts in 36 appearances.

On December 10, 2015, Rutckyj was selected by the Atlanta Braves in the Rule 5 draft. On March 18, 2016, the Braves returned Rutckyj to the Yankees. Rutckyj only made 10 appearances in 2016, logging a 3.60 ERA with 13 strikeouts in 10 innings of work. Rutckyj began the 2017 season with Trenton, but after allowing one run in 2/3 of an inning, he was released on May 1, 2017.

=== Winnipeg Goldeyes ===
On June 27, 2017, Rutckyj signed with the Winnipeg Goldeyes of the American Association of Independent Professional Baseball. In 22 games for Winnipeg, Rutckyj pitched to a 5.57 ERA with 21 strikeouts in 21 innings pitched.

=== Ottawa Champions ===
On January 31, 2018, Rutckyj was traded to the Ottawa Champions of the Can-Am League in exchange for a player to be named later. With Ottawa, Rutckyj registered a 5.64 ERA and 2-6 record with 65 strikeouts. He returned to Ottawa in 2019, appearing in 29 games and recording a 3.03 ERA with 53 strikeouts. He became a free agent following the season.

On November 22, 2019, Rutckyj signed with the Adelaide Giants of the Australian Baseball League for the 2019/2020 season.

=== Québec Capitales ===
On July 7, 2021, Rutckyj signed with the Québec Capitales, playing as Équipe Québec for the 2021 season, of the Frontier League. He would end up re-signing with the Capitales after the dissolution of Équipe Québec for the 2022 season.

=== Niigata Albirex ===
On April 3, 2022, it was announced that Rutckyj had signed with the Niigata Albirex of the Baseball Challenge League.

=== Québec Capitales (second stint) ===
On July 14, 2023, Rutckyj signed with the Québec Capitales of the Frontier League. In 20 relief outings for Québec, Rutckyj logged a 1.59 ERA with 27 strikeouts and one save across 22 2/3 innings pitched.

=== Pericos de Puebla ===
On April 22, 2024, Rutckyj signed with the Pericos de Puebla of the Mexican League. In one appearance for Puebla, he allowed one run in one inning pitched. Rutckyj was released by the club on April 26.

=== El Águila de Veracruz ===
On May 20, 2024, Rutckyj signed with El Águila de Veracruz of the Mexican League. In 15 appearances for the team, he compiled a 1.42 ERA with 11 strikeouts across 12 2/3 innings pitched. Rutckyj was released by Veracruz on December 2.

=== Tigres de Quintana Roo ===
On May 16, 2025, Rutckyj signed with the Saraperos de Saltillo of the Mexican League. Rutckyj did not make an appearance for Saltillo before he was released by the team on June 16. On June 20, Rutckyj signed with the Tigres de Quintana Roo. In eight appearances for Quintana Roo, he logged an 0-1 record and 3.38 ERA with six strikeouts across 5 1/3 innings pitched. Rutckyj was released by the Tigres on July 11.

== International career ==
In 2015, Rutckyj was selected to play for the Canada national baseball team at the Pan American Games.

Rutckyj also represented Canada at the 2019 Pan American Games Qualifier, the 2019 Pan American Games, the 2019 WBSC Premier12, and the 2023 World Baseball Classic.
