= Eric Wood (baseball) =

Canadian baseball player (born 1992)

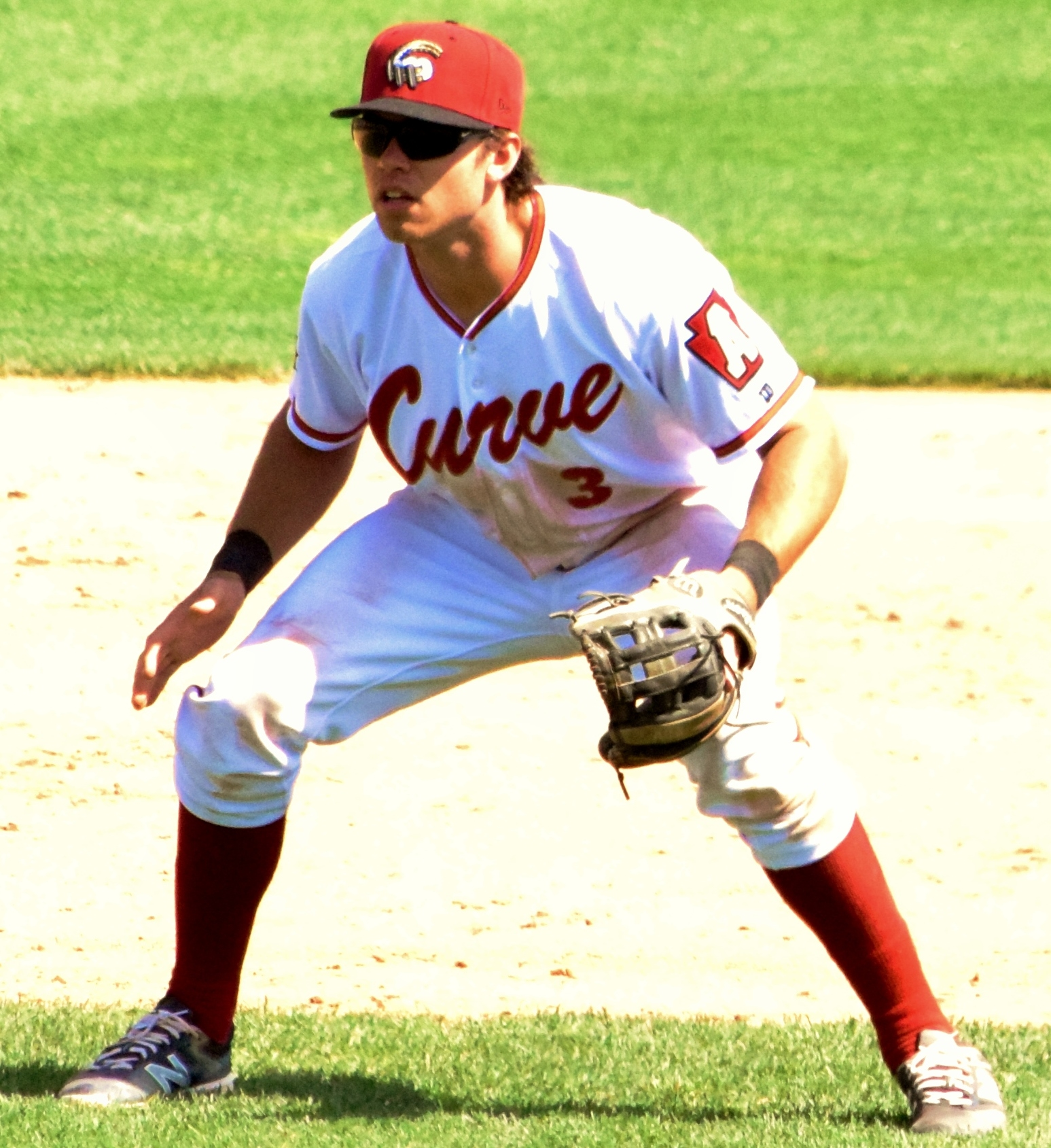
- Wood with the Altoona Curve in 2016
- Third baseman / Outfielder
- Born: November 22, 1992 (age 33); Toronto, Ontario, Canada
- Batted: Right Threw: Right

CPBL debut
- March 24, 2019, for the Chinatrust Brothers

Last CPBL appearance
- March 26, 2019, for the Chinatrust Brothers

CPBL statistics
- Batting average: .000
- Home runs: 0
- Runs batted in: 0
- Stats at Baseball Reference

Teams
- Chinatrust Brothers (2019)
Medals
Men's baseball
Representing Canada
Pan American Games
Silver medal – second place	2019 Lima	Team

Eric Elliot Wood (born November 22, 1992) is a Canadian former professional baseball third baseman. He played in the Chinese Professional Baseball League (CPBL) for the Chinatrust Brothers.

== Career ==
Wood attended Pickering High School in Ajax, Ontario, and Blinn College, in Brenham, Texas. The Oakland Athletics selected Wood in the 37th round of the 2011 Major League Baseball draft, but he did not sign, and returned to Blinn for a second season.

=== Pittsburgh Pirates ===
The Pittsburgh Pirates selected Wood in the sixth round, with the 196th overall selection, of the 2012 Major League Baseball draft, and he signed.

After signing, he made his professional debut in the same season with the GCL Pirates. After batting .287/.371/.467 with four home runs and 24 RBIs, he was promoted to the State College Spikes at the end of the season. In six games for the Spikes, he batted .200. In 2013, he played for the West Virginia Power where he posted a .255 batting average with six home runs and 51 RBIs in 97 games. In 2014, he played with the Bradenton Marauders where he slashed .271/.345/.393 with three home runs and 44 RBIs in 113 games. He played for the Altoona Curve in 2015 where he batted .237 with two home runs and 28 RBIs in 101 games, and returned there in 2016, compiling a .249 batting average with 16 home runs and 50 RBIs in 118 games.

The Pirates invited Wood to spring training in 2017. In 2017, he played for the Indianapolis Indians where he batted .238/.311/.438 with 16 home runs and 61 RBIs in 120 games.

He began 2018 with the Indians, playing in 86 games and hitting .269/.328/.481 with 11 home runs and 39 RBI. Wood elected free agency following the season on November 2, 2018.

=== Chinatrust Brothers ===
On December 29, 2018, Wood signed a contract with the Chinatrust Brothers of the Chinese Professional Baseball League. However, just two games into the season, Wood was released by the Brothers on March 27, 2019.

On March 24, 2019, Wood made his CPBL debut. It was rumored that his release could have resulted from an argument between himself and Brothers manager Scott Budner, who allegedly tried to physically fight Wood following a game on March 26.

=== Pittsburgh Pirates (second stint) ===
On March 29, 2019, Wood signed a minor league contract to return to the Pittsburgh Pirates organization. In 78 games for the Triple–A Indianapolis Indians, he slashed .247/.319/.414 with nine home runs and 32 RBI. Wood elected free agency following the season on November 4.

=== Winnipeg Goldeyes ===
On March 23, 2020, Wood signed with the Winnipeg Goldeyes of the American Association of Independent Professional Baseball. Wood was released on August 31.

== International career ==
Wood played for the Canada national baseball team in the 2017 World Baseball Classic, 2019 Pan American Games Qualifier, 2019 Pan American Games and 2019 WBSC Premier12.
