= Alfredo Fígaro =

Dominican baseball player (born 1984)

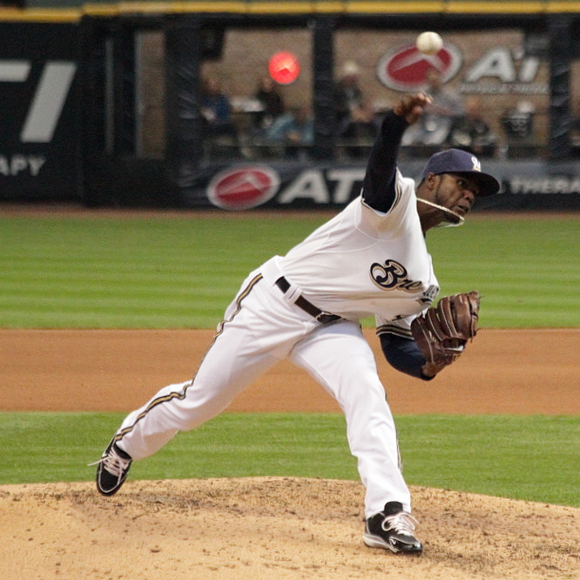
- Figaro with the Milwaukee Brewers
- Pitcher
- Born: July 7, 1984 (age 42); Samaná, Dominican Republic
- Batted: Right Threw: Right

Professional debut
- MLB: June 20, 2009, for the Detroit Tigers
- NPB: April 14, 2011, for the Orix Buffaloes
- KBO: March 28, 2015, for the Samsung Lions
- CPBL: March 26, 2017, for the Uni-President 7-Eleven Lions

Last appearance
- MLB: September 27, 2014, for the Milwaukee Brewers
- NPB: August 5, 2012, for the Orix Buffaloes
- KBO: October 3, 2015, for the Samsung Lions
- CPBL: October 3, 2017, for the Uni-President Lions

MLB statistics
- Win–loss record: 5–8
- Earned run average: 5.04
- Strikeouts: 83

NPB statistics
- Win–loss record: 8–11
- Earned run average: 3.31
- Strikeouts: 127

KBO statistics
- Win–loss record: 13–7
- Earned run average: 3.38
- Strikeouts: 117

CPBL statistics
- Win–loss record: 5–9
- Earned run average: 6.30
- Strikeouts: 109
- Stats at Baseball Reference

Teams
- Detroit Tigers (2009–2010); Orix Buffaloes (2011–2012); Milwaukee Brewers (2013–2014); Samsung Lions (2015); Uni-President Lions (2017)
Medals
Men's baseball
Representing Dominican Republic
Bolivarian Games
| Gold medal – first place | 2022 Valledupar | Team |

Alfredo Fígaro (born July 7, 1984) is a Dominican former professional baseball pitcher. He played in Major League Baseball (MLB) for the Detroit Tigers and Milwaukee Brewers. He also played in Nippon Professional Baseball (NPB) for the Orix Buffaloes, the KBO League for the Samsung Lions, and the Chinese Professional Baseball League (CPBL) for the Uni-President Lions.

== Professional career ==
=== Detroit Tigers ===
Fígaro was drafted in the 2006 MLB draft and signed with the Detroit Tigers. He was a signed to their Rookie League affiliate, the Gulf Coast League Tigers. With GCL in 2006 he had a 3–1 win–loss record with a 0.70 earned run average (ERA) in 14 games, four of which were starts. In 2007, Fígaro started the season with the Single-A Oneonta Tigers and went 4–2 with a 3.38 ERA in 11 starts before being called up to the Lakeland Tigers. At Lakeland he had a 0–2 win–loss record in four starts. To begin 2008, the Tigers sent Fígaro to another one of their three Single-A affiliates, the West Michigan Whitecaps. With the Whitecaps, Fígaro had a career high in wins (12), starts (19), complete games (2), innings pitched (123) and strikeouts (96). He was called back up to Lakeland and for a second season didn't have any wins, going 0–5 with a 4.91 ERA in five starts. Fígaro started 2009 with the Double-A Erie SeaWolves and was named Eastern League player of the week for the week of April 20. For the season he has a 5–2 record with a 4.10 ERA.

Fígaro was called up on June 20, 2009, and to clear room for him, the Tigers designated Dane Sardinha for assignment. Fígaro made his major league debut on June 20, replacing Willis in the starting rotation. In 2009, he had a 2–2 record with a 6.35 ERA and 16 strikeouts in 17 innings and three starts. In his second start he gave up seven earned runs and 10 hits in three innings against the Houston Astros. Tigers manager Jim Leyland said of the outing, "He pitched very tentative until the horse was out of the barn. The one thing I thought he would be was aggressive. He pitched like he was caught up in the names on the back." He was demoted to the Triple-A Toledo Mud Hens in favor of Luke French on June 29, 2009.

=== Orix Buffaloes ===
On December 14, 2010, the Tigers sold Fígaro's contract to the Orix Buffaloes of Nippon Professional Baseball. He re-signed with Orix on November 14, 2011.

=== Milwaukee Brewers ===
On January 31, 2013, the Brewers signed Fígaro to a minor league contract, with an invitation to spring training. He beat out fellow reliever Donovan Hand as the last player to be added to the 25-man roster after spring training.

=== Samsung Lions ===
On October 2, 2014, the Texas Rangers claimed Fígaro off waivers from Milwaukee. On October 31, Fígaro was removed from the 40-man roster and sent outright to the Triple-A Round Rock Express. He elected free agency on November 3.

Fígaro subsequently signed with the Samsung Lions of the KBO League for the 2015 season.

=== Los Angeles Dodgers ===
On June 11, 2016, Fígaro signed a minor league contract with the Los Angeles Dodgers, where he played with the Double-A Tulsa Drillers and the Triple-A Oklahoma City Dodgers. In 10 games between the two affiliates, (and the rookie league Arizona League Dodgers) he accumulated a 3–0 record and 2.70 ERA with 20 strikeouts over 40 innings. He elected free agency following the season on November 7.

=== Uni-President 7-Eleven Lions ===
Fígaro signed with the Uni-President 7-Eleven Lions of the Chinese Professional Baseball League for the 2017 season.

== Personal life ==
Fígaro is the cousin of former Major League Baseball pitcher Fernando Rodney. He played for the Dominican Republic national team at the 2022 Bolivarian Games, helping his team to win the gold medal.
