= Colombia women's national baseball team =

Information
- Country: Colombia
- Federation: Federación Colombiana de Béisbol
- Confederation: COPABE

The Colombia women's national baseball team is a national team of Colombia and is controlled by the Federación Colombiana de Béisbol. It represents the nation in women's international competition.
