= South American Baseball Championship =

International sporting competition

- Current season, competition or edition: 2024 South American Baseball Championship
- Sport: Baseball
- Founded: 1957
- First season: 1957
- Countries: 9
- Most recent champions: Argentina (7th title) (2024 South American Baseball Championship)
- Most titles: Brazil (8 titles)

The South American Baseball Championship (Spanish: Campeonato Sudamericano de Béisbol) is a competition featuring teams affiliated with the South American Confederation of Baseball (CONSUBE). The first edition was played in 1957 with 3 participating countries: Argentina, Brazil, and Peru.

== Medal Count ==
Rank	Nation	Gold	Silver	Bronze	Total
1	Brazil	8	9	1	18
2	Argentina	7	4	2	13
3	Ecuador	2	3	5	9
4	Venezuela	2	1	0	3
5	Colombia	1	0	1	2
6	Peru	0	2	8	10
7	Chile	0	0	3	3
Totals (7 entries)		20	19	20	59

== Results ==
No.	Year	Venue	Champion	Runner-up	Third place
I	1957	Brazil	Brazil	Peru	Argentina
II	1959	Chile	Brazil; Argentina	Peru	Ecuador
III	1961	Peru	Venezuela	Brazil	Peru
IV	1963	Argentina	Ecuador	Brazil	Peru
V	1966	Ecuador	Ecuador	Brazil	Peru
VI	1968	Brazil	Brazil	Argentina	Peru
VII	1970	Chile	Brazil	Argentina	Peru
VIII	1971	Peru	Brazil	Ecuador	Peru
IX	1973	Argentina	Venezuela	Brazil	Argentina
X	2004	Argentina	Argentina	Brazil	Ecuador
XI	2005	Brazil	Brazil	Venezuela	Ecuador
XII	2011	Argentina	Argentina	Ecuador	Brazil
XIII	2012	Ecuador	Argentina	Ecuador	Peru
XIV	2013	Chile	Argentina	Brazil	Ecuador; Chile
XV	2015	Brazil	Colombia	Brazil	Peru
XVI	2016	Argentina	Brazil	Argentina	Colombia
XVII	2018	Argentina	Argentina	Brazil	Chile
XVIII	2022	Peru	Brazil	Argentina	Ecuador
XIX	2024	Peru	Argentina	Brazil	Chile
