= Puerto Rico national Baseball5 team =

National Baseball5 team

Puerto Rico

Information
- Country: Puerto Rico
- Federation: Federación de Béisbol Aficionado de Puerto Rico
- Confederation: WBSC Americas
- Manager: Pedro Agosto

WBSC ranking
- Current: 22 (7 August 2026)

Baseball5 Pan American Championship
- Appearances: 1 (first in 2024)
- Best result: 4th (1 time, in 2024)

The Puerto Rico national Baseball5 team represents Puerto Rico in international Baseball5 competitions.

== History ==
In 2024, the Federación de Béisbol Aficionado de Puerto Rico launched a program aimed to develop Baseball5 in Puerto Rico, along with the nation's Department of Education. This included the certification of over 850 coaches and the creation of the Schoolboys/Schoolgirls Baseball5 Championship.

Puerto Rico participated at the 2024 Baseball5 Pan American Championship held in Barquisimeto, Venezuela, that served as qualifier for the 2024 Baseball5 World Cup in Hong Kong. The team lost all its games except for a victory against Mexico to finish the tournament with a 1–5 record, failing to qualify for the World Cup.

== Current roster ==
As of 7 October 2024

No.	Pos.	Player	Gender
15	IF	Arana Colón	F
11	IF	Ashlimar Hernández	F
10	IF	Carlos Medina	M
5	IF	Joel Quiñones	M
14	IF	Yesimarie Rivera	F
8	IF	Kermith Rodríguez	M
9	IF	Edgar Santiago	M
13	IF	Iadimar Torres	F

=== Staff ===
No.	Pos.	Name
--	Manager	Pedro Agosto

== Tournament record ==
=== Baseball5 Pan American Championship ===
Baseball5 Pan American Championship record
Year	Round	Position	W	L	RS	RA
(Venezuela) 2024	Opening round	4th	1	5	32	110
Total	1/1	–	1	5	32	110
