= Sugar Ray Marimón =

Colombian baseball player (born 1988)

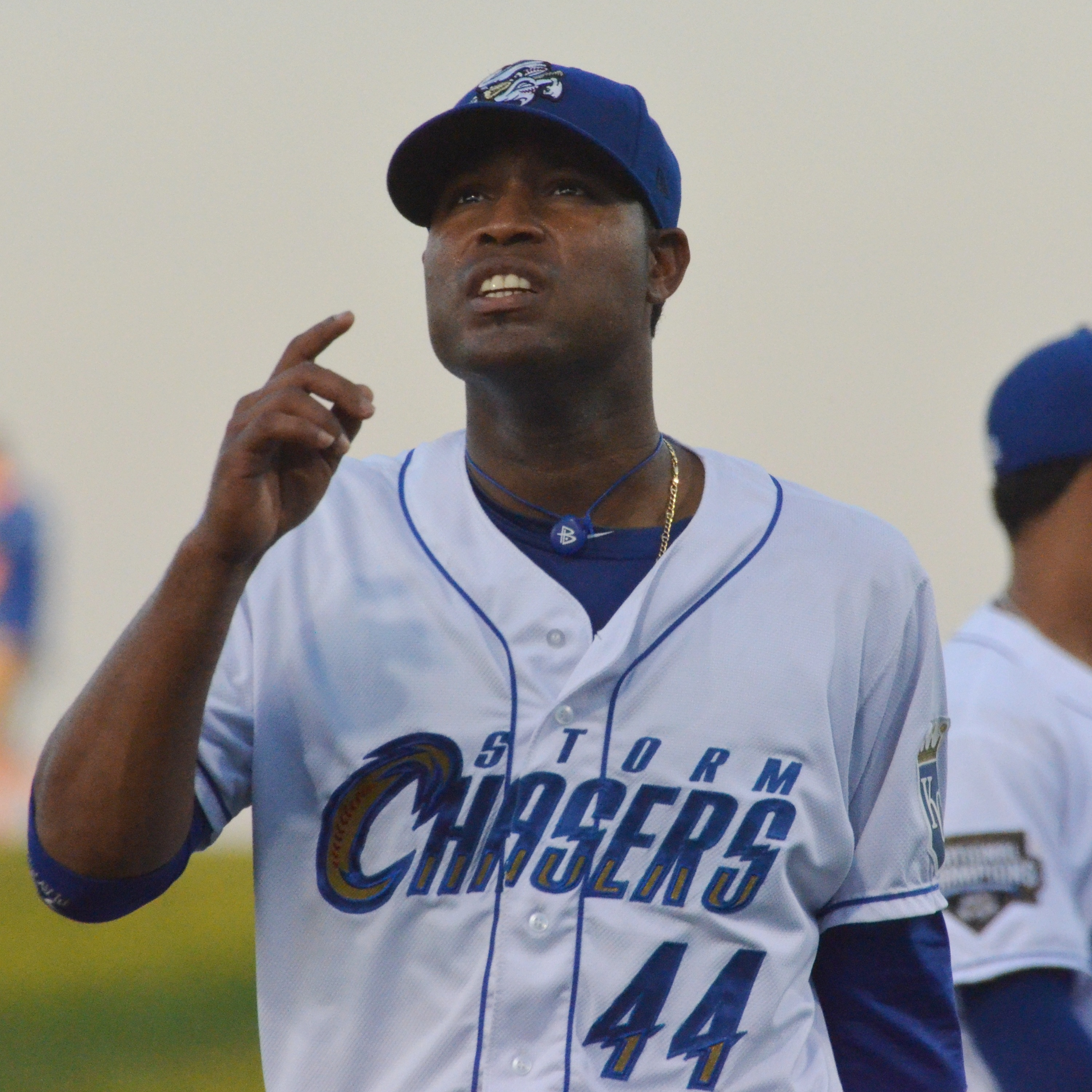
- Marimón with the Omaha Storm Chasers in 2015
- Pitcher
- Born: September 30, 1988 (age 37); Bocagrande, Cartagena, Colombia
- Batted: Right Threw: Right

Professional debut
- MLB: April 14, 2015, for the Atlanta Braves
- KBO: April 1, 2016, for the KT Wiz

Last appearance
- MLB: September 25, 2015, for the Atlanta Braves
- KBO: June 11, 2016, for the KT Wiz

MLB statistics
- Win–loss record: 0–1
- Earned run average: 7.36
- Strikeouts: 14
- WHIP: 1.71

KBO statistics
- Win–loss record: 6–4
- Earned run average: 5.23
- Strikeouts: 45
- WHIP: 1.44
- Stats at Baseball Reference

Teams
- Atlanta Braves (2015); KT Wiz (2016)
Medals
Men's baseball
Representing Colombia
Bolivarian Games
Silver medal – second place	2022 Valledupar	Team

Sugar Ray Marimón (born September 30, 1988) is a Colombian former professional baseball pitcher. He played in Major League Baseball (MLB) for the Atlanta Braves, and in the KBO League for the KT Wiz.

== Career ==
=== Kansas City Royals ===
On November 20, 2006, Marimón signed with Kansas City Royals' scout Mike Toomey for approximately $25,000. He made his professional debut with the Dominican Summer League Royals. Marimón spent the next two seasons at the rookie-level. He struggled to an 0-2 record and 11.98 ERA in six games for the Burlington Royals in 2008; in 2009, he logged a 3-3 record and 5.78 ERA with 47 strikeouts in 15 games (13 starts) for the Idaho Falls Chukars.

Marimón spent the following two seasons at the Single-A level. He made 14 starts for the Burlington Bees in 2010, posting a 2-6 record and 5.91 ERA with 50 strikeouts; in 13 starts for the Kane County Cougars, he logged a 3-5 record and 3.68 ERA with 54 strikeouts. Marimón split the 2012 campaign between the High-A Wilmington Blue Rocks and Double-A Northwest Arkansas Naturals. In 26 appearances (21 starts) for the two affiliates, he posted a cumulative 7-8 record and 3.34 ERA with 96 strikeouts and one save across 134 2/3 innings pitched.

Marimón returned to Northwest Arkansas in 2013, registering a 6-14 record and 4.31 ERA with 119 strikeouts across 27 games (26 starts). He split the 2014 season between Idaho Falls, Northwest Arkansas, and the Triple-A Omaha Storm Chasers, accumulating a combined 5-6 record and 3.19 ERA with 84 strikeouts in 22 games (21 starts).

=== Atlanta Braves ===
On November 4, 2014, Marimón signed a minor league contract with the Atlanta Braves organization. Marimón was invited to spring training, but did not make the Opening Day roster. On April 13, 2015, Marimón was selected to the 40-man roster and promoted to the major leagues for the first time. He debuted the next day, throwing four innings against the Miami Marlins in relief of Trevor Cahill. Marimón made 16 appearances for the Braves during his rookie campaign, but struggled to an 0-1 record and 7.36 ERA with 14 strikeouts across 25 2/3 innings pitched.

=== KT Wiz ===
On November 16, 2015, Marimón signed with the KT Wiz of the KBO League. He made 12 starts for the Wiz in 2016, posting a 6-4 record and 5.23 ERA with 45 strikeouts over 62 innings of work. Marimón was released by the team on July 10, 2016.

Marimón represented Colombia at the 2017 World Baseball Classic.

== Personal ==
Marimón is the second cousin of pitcher Julio Teherán. Both played for the Atlanta Braves during the 2015 MLB season.
