= Estadio Juárez Vive =

Stadium in Ciudad Juárez, Mexico

- Interactive map of Estadio Juárez Vive
- Full name: Estadio Juárez Vive
- Location: Ciudad Juárez, Chihuahua, Mexico
- Coordinates: 31.7247°N 106.4706°W
- Owner: City of Ciudad Juárez
- Capacity: 15,000
- Surface: Natural grass

Construction
- Opened: 2013
- Renovated: 2026

Tenant
- Indios de Ciudad Juárez (2013–)

Estadio Juárez Vive is a multi-use stadium in Ciudad Juárez, Chihuahua, Mexico. It is currently used mostly for baseball matches. The stadium has a capacity 15,000 people and opened in 2013.
