= Estadio Sherwin-Williams Beto Ávila =

Baseball stadium in Cancun, Mexico

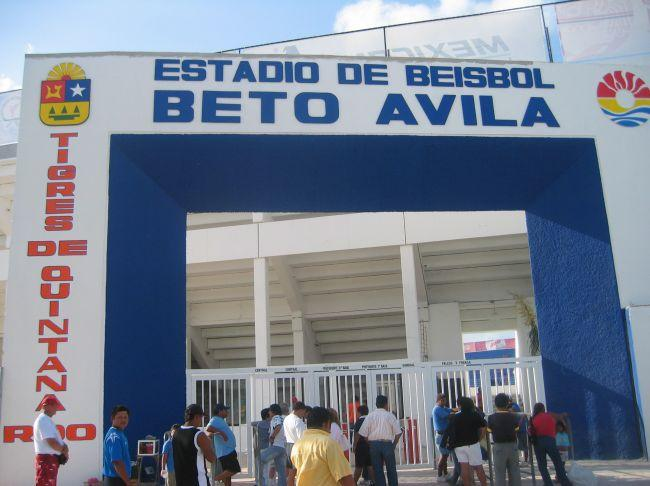
- Estadio Sherwin-Williams Beto Ávila main entrance in 2007
- Interactive map of Estadio Sherwin-Williams Beto Ávila
- Location: Cancún, Quintana Roo, Mexico
- Coordinates: 21°9′9.09″N 86°50′12.70″W
- Capacity: 10,285

Construction
- Renovated: 2006

Tenants
- Marlins de Cancún (1980s); Langosteros de Quintana Roo (1996–1997); Tigres de Quintana Roo (2007–present)

Estadio Sherwin-Williams Beto Ávila is a stadium in Cancún, Mexico.

== History ==
It is primarily used for baseball, and is the home field of the Quintana Roo Tigres Mexican League baseball team. It has a capacity of 10,285 people. It is named to honor Beto Ávila, the former Mexican major league baseball player (known as Bobby Avila in the U. S.) who is most remembered for his years with the Cleveland Indians, (1949–58) where he won the American League batting title in 1954 with an average of .341, and where he was selected to the AL All Star Team in 1952, '54, and '55. After splitting time with the Baltimore Orioles, Boston Red Sox, and Milwaukee Braves in 1959, his last year of active play (1960) was with the Tigres del México.

In the 1980s, the park, originally with a capacity of 4,500, was the homefield of the Marlins de Cancún. It became an LMB park in 1996 when the Langosteros de Quintana Roo (Quintana Roo Lobstermen) were promoted to that league. The park was expanded to seat 7,000. However, after the Lobstermen left Cancún, the stadium was heavily damaged by Hurricane Wilma in October 2005. In 2006, renovations were undertaken to rebuild and expand the stadium and draw an LMB team back to Cancún. After the 28 million peso renovation, the Tigres played the 2007 season with Beto Ávila as their homefield.

== See also ==
- Estadio Cancun 86
