= Villa María del Triunfo =

District of Lima, Peru

Coordinates: 12°09′29″S 76°55′46″W

- District
- Municipal building

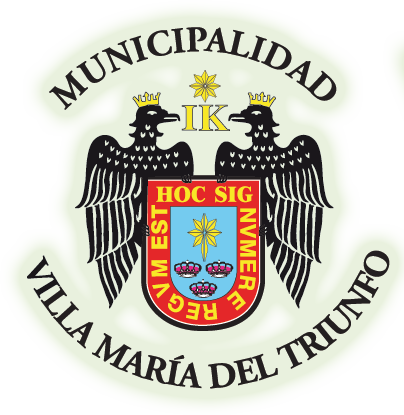
- Coat of arms

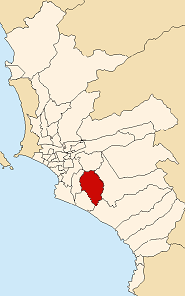
- Location of Villa María del Triunfo in Lima
- Country: Peru
- Region: Lima
- Province: Lima
- Founded: December 28, 1961
- Capital: Villa María del Triunfo
- Subdivisions: 1 populated center

Government
  - Mayor: Eloy Chávez (2019-2026)

Area
  - Total: 70.57 km^{2} (27.25 sq mi)
- Elevation: 158 m (518 ft)

Population (2017)
  - Total: 398,433
  - Density: 5,646/km^{2} (14,620/sq mi)
- Time zone: UTC-5 (PET)
- Area code: 35
- UBIGEO: 150143
- Website: munivmt.gob.pe

Villa María del Triunfo is a district of the Lima Province in Peru. It is located in the Cono Sur area of the city of Lima. It was officially established as a district on December 28, 1961. The current mayor (alcalde) of Villa María del Triunfo is Eloy Chávez Hernández.

== Politics ==
Villa María del Triunfo is under the jurisdiction of its own district municipality, as well as that of the Metropolitan Municipality of Lima.

=== List of mayors ===
Since 2023, the incumbent mayor is Eloy Chávez.

1. Leonardo Maraví Olivos, 1962-1963
2. Andrés Antezana Sánchez, 1963-1964
3. Aroldo Prettell Vega, APRA-UNO 1964-1966
4. Aroldo Prettell Vega, APRA-UNO 1967-1969
5. Pedro Valle Medina, 1970-1972
6. Emilio Suicho Apac, 1972-1977
7. Luis Mendoza Sagaceta, 1979-1980
8. Alfredo Valle V., 1980
9. Oscar López Chávez, AP 1981-1983
10. Washington Armando Ipenza Pacheco, IU (UNIR) 1984-1986
11. Walter Machuca Arteta, PAP 1987-1989
12. Luis Max Villavicencio Torres, IU (PUM) 1990-1992
13. Aniceto Ibarguen Rios, OBRAS 1993-1995
14. Rafael Chacón Saavedra, Cambio 90 - Nueva Mayoría 1996-1998
15. Washington Armando Ipenza Pacheco, Somos Perú 1999-2002
16. Washington Armando Ipenza Pacheco, Somos Perú 2003-2006
17. Juan José Castillo Angeles, Unidad Nacional 2007-2010
18. Silvia Barrera Vásquez, Perú Posible 2011-2014
19. Carlos Palomino Arias (vacated), Solidaridad Nacional 2015-2017
20. Ángel Chilingano Villanueva (suspended), Solidaridad Nacional 2017-2017
21. César Infanzón Quispe (interim), Solidaridad Nacional 2017-2018
22. Anatolia Chamoli de Ludeña (interim), Solidaridad Nacional 2018-2018
23. Eloy Chávez Hernández, Perú Patria Segura 2019-2022
24. Eloy Chávez Hernández, Alianza para el Progreso 2023-present

== Geography ==
The district has a total land area of 70.57 km^{2}. Its administrative center is located 158 meters above sea level.

=== Boundaries ===
- North: La Molina
- East: Pachacámac
- South: Villa El Salvador and Lurín
- West: San Juan de Miraflores

== Demographics ==
According to a 2002 estimate by the INEI, the district has 329,057 inhabitants and a population density of 4662.8 persons/km^{2}. In 1999, there were 71,889 households in the district.
According to Propoli (http://www.propoli.org/quehacemos.htm) :
the principal economic activities in the region are timber, restaurants, footwear, clothing, metalworking, tourism.
Undernourishment rate is 14.76%
Population without access to drinking water is 34.05%
Population without electricity is 22.9%

== See also ==
- Administrative divisions of Peru
- List of mayors of Villa María del Triunfo District
