= Chile national baseball team =

Information
- Country: Chile
- Federation: Federación de Béisbol y Softbol de Chile
- Confederation: COPABE
- Manager: Kaleeb Nelson Campo

WBSC ranking
- Current: 51 ▼6 (31 December 2025)

The Chile national baseball team is the national baseball team of Chile. The team represents Chile in international competitions. It is affiliated to the International Baseball Federation and his continental confederation COPABE. It is controlled by the Federación de Béisbol y Softbol de Chile.

== History of Baseball in Chile ==
=== Early Beginnings ===
The sport of baseball was introduced to Chile on July 4, 1918. At that time, the city of Iquique in northern Chile was experiencing a nitrate boom. Sakurada Tatsukichi Endo, a Japanese man who went by the name "John," arrived in Iquique aboard a ship named Maru. John was an enthusiast of baseball, which was already a popular sport in the United States, Europe, and his native Japan. In 1931, John, along with eight other local players, established the Iquique Baseball Association, becoming Chile's first governing body for the sport.

=== Initial Development ===
Early baseball practices in Iquique took place on makeshift fields, using subpar equipment provided by Sakurada. Despite these humble beginnings, baseball soon started to spread to other cities in northern Chile, including Tocopilla, Antofagasta, and Chuquicamata.

=== Expansion and Clubs ===
By 1949, the sport had reached Santiago, where the first baseball clubs were established. The clubs comprised a diverse group of players, including Chileans, Nicaraguans, and Venezuelans. In that same year, the first inter-city match in Chilean baseball history took place in the north. In 1951, the Baseball Federation of Chile was founded, and by 1953, an annual national championship had been established.

=== Successes and Challenges ===
The 1980s were a golden era for baseball in Chile, particularly due to the disillusionment with the national football team's performance in the 1982 World Cup in Spain. Chilean baseball reached a high point when it participated in the Baseball World Youth Cup in Japan in 1989. However, the victory of the football team Colo-Colo in the 1991 Copa Libertadores led to a resurgence of football's popularity, which resulted in a decline for baseball, as well as other sports like basketball and boxing.

=== Modern Era ===
Between 1998 and 2004, baseball faced a severe decline, verging on extinction from the professional sports scene in Chile. This period also saw declines in basketball and volleyball. The sport's federation has cited the overwhelming popularity of football and tennis as major challenges, as they have nearly monopolized the sports landscape in Chile.

== Kits ==
Home
Away

== Team ==
=== Players ===
Squad for the 2023 Pan American Games.

Catchers

- Gabriel Valladares
- Joaquín Quiroz
- Benjamín Meza

Infielders

- Manuel Zapata
- Roberto Martínez
- David Rubio
- Allan Chu
- Felipe Rubio

Outfielders

- Anderson Castro
- Cristóbal Hiche
- Elio Quiñones
- José Hernández

Pitchers

- Milovan Troncoso
- Camilo Rivera
- Bogdan Leyton
- Nelson Varas
- Luciano Morales
- Javier Branco Vargas
- Sebastián Vega
- Emilio Germann-Cisterna
- Luciano Echeverría (IF)
- Yerko Mora (IF)
- Andrés Rodríguez (OF)
- Benjamín Munder (OF)
