= Bolivia national baseball team =

Information
- Country: Bolivia
- Federation: Federación Boliviana de Béisbol y Softbol
- Confederation: COPABE

WBSC ranking
- Current: NR (26 March 2026)

The Bolivia national baseball team is the national baseball team of Bolivia. The team represents Bolivia in international competitions.
