= Ecuador national baseball team =

Information
- Country: Ecuador
- Federation: Ecuatoriana de Beisbol
- Confederation: COPABE
- Manager: (Ecuador) Segundo Molina

WBSC ranking
- Current: 52 (26 March 2026)

The Ecuador national baseball team is the national baseball team of Ecuador. The team represents Ecuador in international competitions.

== Honors ==
Baseball at the Summer Olympics

- 2008 : Lost in qualifying.

== Results ==
South American Baseball Championship

Year	Venue	Position
1957	Brazil	Did not Participate
1959	Chile	3rd
1961	Peru	Did not Participate
1963	Argentina	1st
1966	Ecuador	1st
1968	Brazil	Did not Participate
1970	Chile	4th
1971	Peru	2nd
1973	Argentina	Did not Participate
2004	Argentina	3rd
2005	Brazil	3rd
2011	Argentina	2nd
2012	Ecuador	2nd
2013	Chile	3rd
2015	Brazil	Did not Participate
2016	Argentina	Did not Participate
2018	Argentina	Did not Participate
2022	Peru	3rd
2024	Peru	5th
Total		12/18

Bolivarian Games

Year	Venue	Position
1938	Colombia	
1947	Peru	
1951	Venezuela	
1961	Colombia	
1965	Ecuador	
1970	Venezuela	4th
1973	Panama	4th
1981	Venezuela	3rd
1985	Ecuador	3rd
1989	Venezuela	
2001	Ecuador	4th
2009	Bolivia	Did not Participate
2013	Peru	3rd
2017	Colombia	Did not Participate
2022	Colombia	Did not Participate
2025	Peru	5th
Total		
