= Peru national baseball team =

Information
- Country: Peru
- Federation: Peruvian Federation
- Confederation: WBSC Americas
- Manager: Gianpierre Reano Pacheco

WBSC ranking
- Current: 34 (26 October 2026)
- Highest: 31 (March 2026)
- Lowest: 56 (December 2024)

Uniforms
Home	Away	Third

The Peru national baseball team is the national baseball team of Peru. The team represents Peru in international competitions.

Peru was invited to the 1939 Amateur World Series, held in Havana, Cuba, but did not attend.

== Results ==
World Baseball Classic

- 2006-2009 : Not invited
- 2013-2026 : Did not enter

Baseball World Cup

- 1938-2011 : Did not enter

South American Baseball Championship

Year	Venue	Position
1957	Brazil	2nd
1959	Chile	2nd
1961	Peru	3rd
1963	Argentina	3rd
1966	Ecuador	3rd
1968	Brazil	3rd
1970	Chile	3rd
1971	Peru	3rd
1973	Argentina	Did not Participate
2004	Argentina	4th
2005	Brazil	Did not Participate
2011	Argentina	5th
2012	Ecuador	3rd
2013	Chile	5th
2015	Brazil	3rd
2016	Argentina	4th
2018	Argentina	Did not Participate
2022	Peru	4th
2024	Peru	4th
Total		16/19

Bolivarian Games

Year	Venue	Position
1938	Colombia	Did not Participate
1947	Peru	3rd
1951	Venezuela	Did not Participate
1961	Colombia	Did not Participate
1965	Ecuador	Did not Participate
1970	Venezuela	Did not Participate
1973	Panama	Did not Participate
1981	Venezuela	Did not Participate
1985	Ecuador	Did not Participate
1989	Venezuela	Did not Participate
2001	Ecuador	Did not Participate
2009	Bolivia	Did not Participate
2013	Peru	5th
2017	Colombia	5th
2022	Colombia	4th
2025	Peru	2nd
Total		5/16
