= Football in Taiwan =

- Country: Taiwan
- Governing body: Chinese Taipei Football Association
- National teams: Chinese Taipei national football team Chinese Taipei women's national football team Chinese Taipei national futsal team

Club competitions
- Taiwan Football Premier League; Taiwan Second Division Football League; Taiwan President FA Cup; Taiwan Mulan Football League; Taiwan Futsal League

International competitions
- AFC Challenge League; AFC Women's Champions League; FIFA World Cup; AFC Asian Cup; FIFA Women's World Cup; Women's Asian Cup; EAFF E-1 Football Championship; EAFF E-1 Football Championship (women); FIFA Futsal World Cup; FIFA Futsal Women's World Cup; AFC Futsal Club Championship; AFC Futsal Championship; AFC Women's Futsal Asian Cup

The sport of football in Taiwan is run by the Chinese Taipei Football Association. The association administers all national football teams, as well as national competitions. Approximately 40% of the people in Taiwan are interested in football.

== History ==
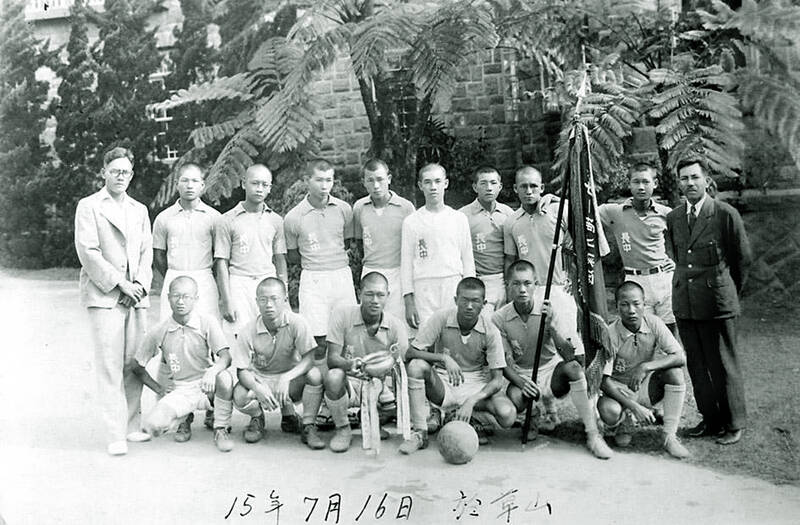
The 1940 Chang Jung High School football team photograph, taken after winning Taiwan's school's soccer championship

Edward Band was credited with introducing football to Taiwan during his tenure as teacher and principal of the Presbyterian Church High School, subsequently renamed Chang Jung Senior High School.

The sport has grown near the status of historically most popular baseball.

== Current structure ==
In 2017 the sport was revamped in Taiwan with the introduction of the Taiwan Football Premier League. The season saw the country's first entry to the AFC Cup when Hang Yuen qualified for the 2018 AFC Cup group stage. The TFPL and the Taiwan Second Division Football League are national football divisions administered by the CTFA. The domestic cup is the Taiwan President FA Cup. Recreational tournament Taiwan International Football League - TIFL also exists.

== Football stadiums ==
Stadium	Capacity	City	Tenants
National Stadium	55,000	Kaohsiung	Chinese Taipei national football team
Tainan Municipal Xinying Stadium	30,000	Tainan	
Taipei Municipal Stadium	20,000	Taipei	Chinese Taipei national football team, Taipei Bravo
Hualien Stadium	12,800	Hualien	

== Attendances ==
The average attendance per top-flight football league season and the club with the highest average attendance:

Season	League average	Best club	Best club average
2024	207	Leopard Cat	439

Source: League page on Wikipedia

== See also ==
- Sport in Taiwan
- List of stadiums in Taiwan
- Football in China
- Women's football in Taiwan
