= Sport in Taiwan =

In Taiwan, some of the most popular sports include baseball, basketball, badminton, football, softball, table tennis, tennis, and volleyball. Martial arts such as tai chi and taekwondo are also practiced by many people. Baseball is the most popular sport in Taiwan, followed by basketball and association football.

Internationally known athletes include Hsieh Su-wei, Kuo Hsing-chun, Tai Tzu-ying, Yani Tseng, and Yang Chuan-kwang, who were among the best in their sport at the peak of their career.

Due to the political status, the organisations or national teams from Taiwan have been competing as Chinese Taipei in international sporting events, such as the Olympic Games.

== History ==
=== Westernization during the Qing dynasty (1858–1895) ===
The Treaty of Tientsin opened up the Taiwanese border to the western countries, and many missionaries came to Taiwan for missionary, medical, and education work. The missionaries promoted the education of intelligence, morality, and physical, and started to include physical education class in the system. At the time, Han Chinese did not have habits of exercise, so the missionaries encouraged students to swim, play, and run after class. Sports like gymnastics, racing, high jump, and hiking were brought to the Han Chinese.

=== Japanese colonial era (1895–1945) ===
As part of the Japanization and the Kōminka movement, modern physical education and sports became universal systematically in Taiwan. Through physical education, Japan's goal is to assimilate the Taiwanese, improve their physical ability and health and sanitary, and upright the ideas. In the book "Taiwan’s Tradition", Tōhō Takayoshi described Han Chinese's physical appearance in Taiwan at the time as "rich people have a body like pigs, while laborers have a body like mantises." To promote sports in Taiwan, the Japanese leader in Taiwan encouraged the establishment of different sports clubs, including martial arts, equestrian, shooting, bicycle, tennis, badminton, soccer, bowling, and gymnastics.

As school enrollment rates got higher and sports competition became popular, sports became universal from students to social classes, establishing a favorable foundation for sports in Taiwan.

=== Kuomintang-led government (1946–1987) ===
When the Kuomintang-led government took back Taiwan from Japan in 1949 and started the national-wide martial law, freedom was restricted and life was strictly regulated under the party-state system. The economy was severely damaged by World War II and the Chinese Civil War, and many sports clubs were dissolved due to the sensitive political environment. Although the sports environment had a setback, Japanese colonial era left a crucial foundation in Taiwan that allowed the passion for sports to grow in this difficult time. Moreover, sports in Taiwan at the time were mainly government-driven, and the government devoted itself to developing sports in Taiwan.

In 1968, the government implemented the national-wide nine-year compulsory education and enforced physical education in every public school. In the same year, the government required government-operated enterprises and some private-sector companies to sponsor local sports teams to prosper the sports industry. Sports teams such as basketball, baseball, and tennis teams were branded by Taiwan Tobacco and Liquor Corporation, Bank of Taiwan, and other major state-owned companies, and the sponsorship model between sports teams and government-own companies lasted till the present. In addition, television became universal in Taiwan during the 1950s and the number of home TV increased drastically. The government commanded major TV stations in Taiwan to live broadcast national team competitions, which successfully drew nationwide attention to sports. In July 1968, Hong-Ye juvenile baseball team defeated the visiting champion team from Japan with a score of 7–0. This historic game and the rise of television made the popularity of baseball skyrocket, and baseball eventually became Taiwan's national sport.

=== Post-martial law (1987–present) ===
After martial law, many athletes flew abroad seeking better training and opportunities. To retain talented athletes, prosper the sports industry, and foster future athletes, the government invested in many short-term and mid-term plans. The "National Sports Development Mid-term Plan" proposed in 1989 proposed the project to refocus local sports development, review athletes training programs, construct sports facilities, invest in sports science and research, and support the lifetime career of athletes. In addition, the multiple versions of the "Sports and Physical education Strategy White Paper" published since 1999 highlighted the dedication of the Taiwanese government to develop local sports and promote physical education in public. To present, sports industry development in Taiwan is primarily funded and strategized by the government under the Ministry of Sports.

== Team sports ==
=== Baseball ===
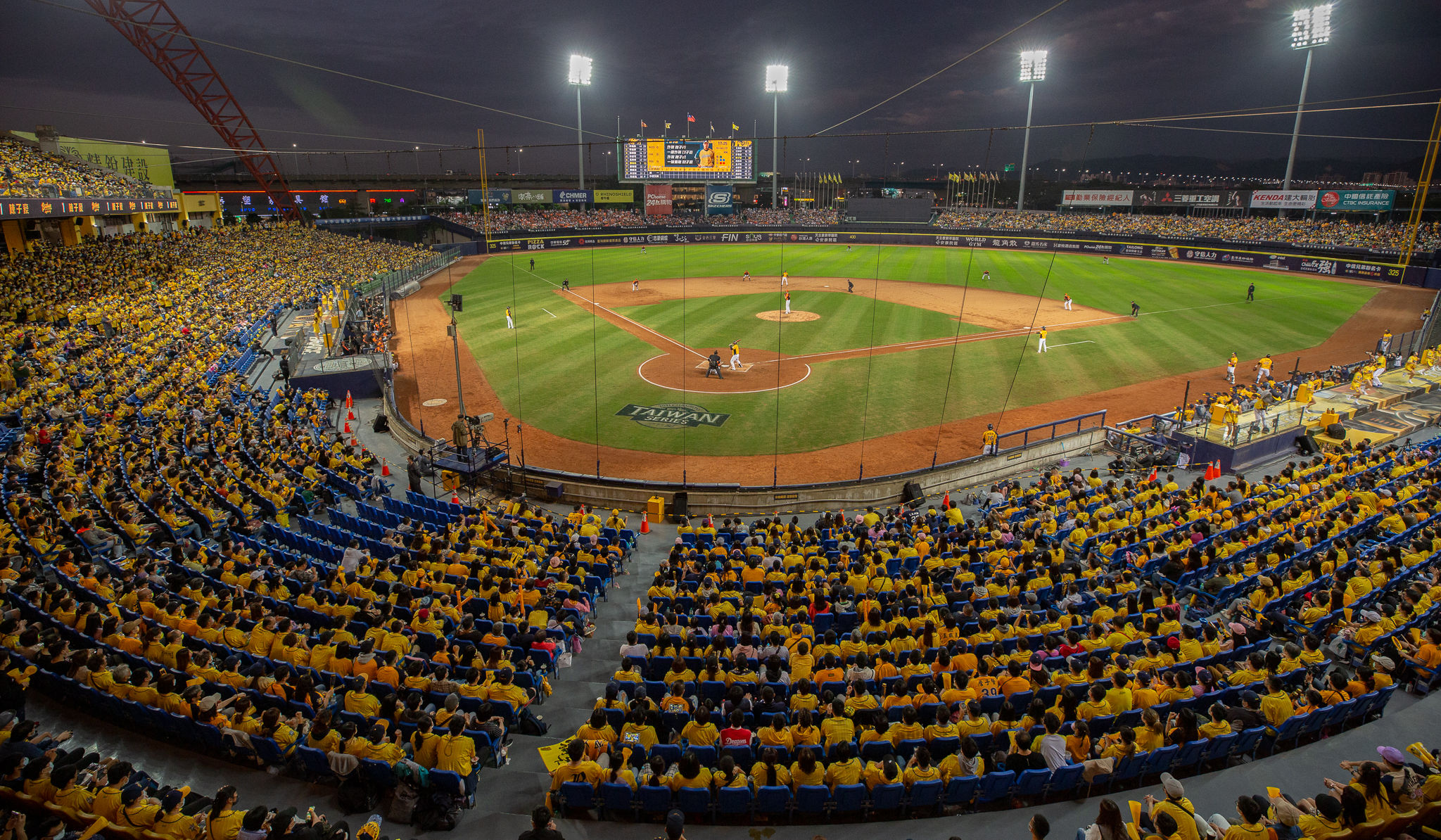
The Chinese Professional Baseball League (CPBL) is the top-tier professional baseball league in Taiwan

Baseball is one of the country's most popular spectator sports. It is commonly considered the national sport in Taiwan. Baseball was first introduced during Japanese rule. The colonizing Japanese sought to use baseball as one of its mechanisms to make Taiwan's population more like Japanese.

Taiwan already had its first baseball team in 1906, during the period of Japanese rule. Only the Japanese played baseball initially, but gradually more and more Taiwanese players joined. In 1931, the Kagi Agricultural and Forestry School (now National Chiayi University) baseball team won second place in the 17th Japanese High School Baseball Championship (Summer Koshien), which shocked the whole of Japan. Since then, a number of Taiwanese baseball players have joined Japanese professional baseball teams. A notable example is, Shosei Go (Wú Chāngzhēng), nicknamed "The Human Locomotive", whose mastery of both pitching and batting won him election to the Japanese Baseball Hall of Fame in 1995 after his retirement.

After World War II in 1945, baseball remained popular in Taiwan. In 1968, Red Leaves from the remote mountainous area in Taitung County defeated the visiting all-star little-league team from Japan, touching off a "little-league baseball craze" in Taiwan. The following year, Golden Dragon little-league baseball team, an all-star team, participated in Little League World Series for the first time and won the championship, which launched the "golden age" of Taiwan's "three youth level baseball" program comprising the little league, senior league, and big league. With regard to little league baseball, Taiwan has won 15 championships from 1969 to 1991. For senior league baseball, Taiwan joined in Senior League World Series held by Little League Baseball at Gary, Indiana in 1972, and won the championship in that inaugural effort. Within 20 years, Taiwan has won 17 championships as of 1991. For big league baseball, Taiwan began entering the Big League World Series held by Little League Baseball at Fort Lauderdale, Florida, in 1974, and won 13 championships within 18 years (until 1991).

The professional baseball league is the Chinese Professional Baseball League (CPBL), and the main playoff competition is the Taiwan Series. Taiwan has been "exporting" baseball talents to Japan and United States over the past few decades, such as Tai-Yuan Kuo (Taigen Kaku) to the Seibu Lions, Chien-Ming Wang to the New York Yankees/Washington Nationals, and Wei-Yin Chen to the Baltimore Orioles. The Chinese Taipei national baseball team and the Chinese Taipei women's national baseball team are currently second best in the world.

Taiwan's dominance in international baseball was demonstrated when the men's team won top three medals across all levels of baseball in 2022, including the U-12, U-15, U-18, U-23, and Baseball5 competitions, the only team to do so in baseball history. Taiwan's men's baseball team, women's baseball team, and baseball5 team are world No.2 on the WBSC Rankings as of December 2022.

=== Basketball ===
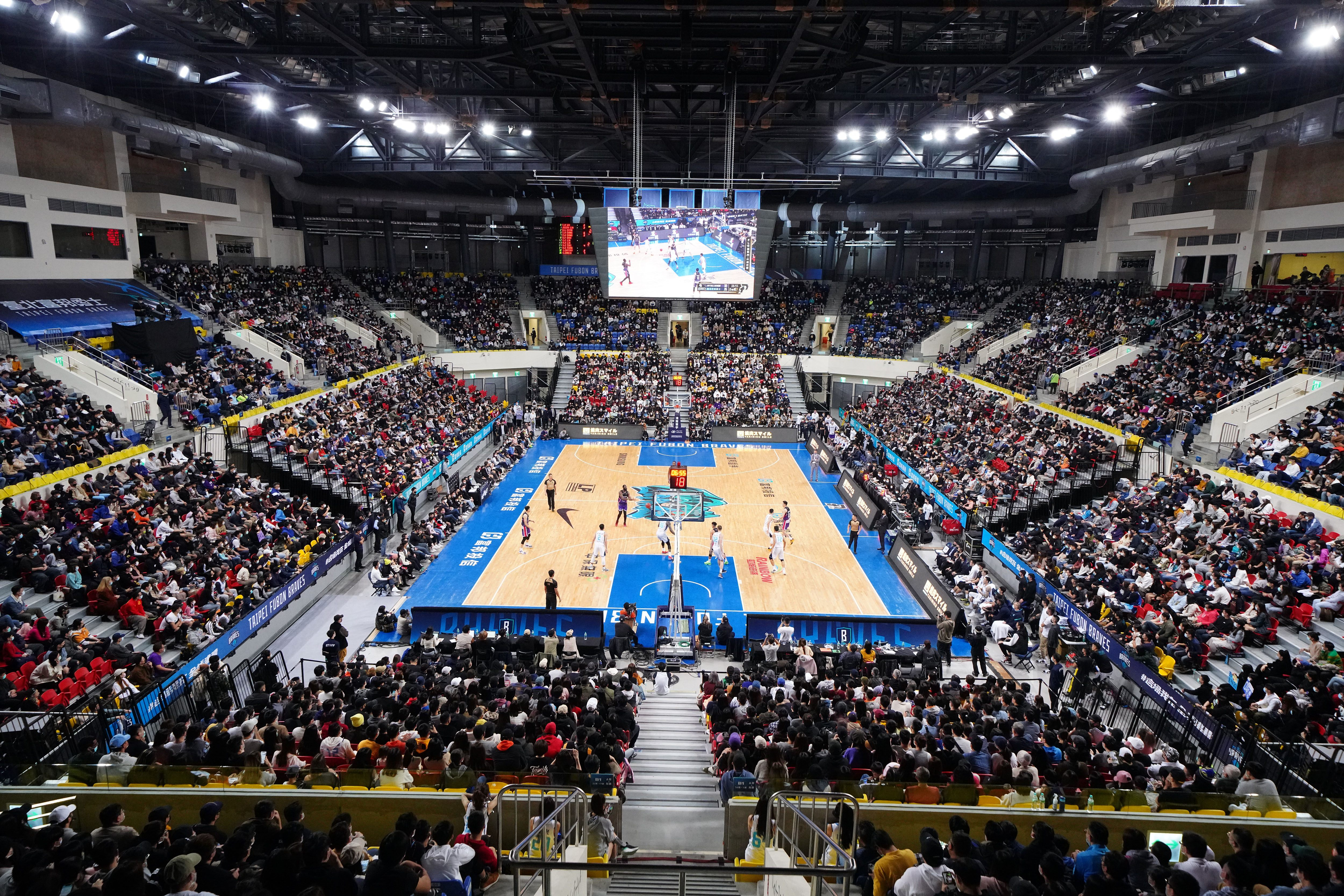
P. League+ match in 2021

Basketball is the second most popular sport in Taiwan. In 1954, the Chinese Taipei Basketball Association (CTBA) was founded as a non-governmental organization that works closely with the government to regulate the basketball industry in Taiwan. In 1993, four individual basketball teams formed the very first professional basketball league in Taiwan called the "Chinese Basketball Association", but the association only lasted 5 years before it was resolved due to the under fulfillment of 6 teams. In 2003, the Chinese Taipei Basketball Association (CTBA) founded a semi-professional basketball league "Super Basketball League" (SBL) that continued the basketball industry in Taiwan. However, the viewership and audience for SBL had contracted throughout the year which resulted in only four teams participating in the year 2022, the lowest number of teams participating in the history of SBL. In 2022, the second professional basketball league "P. LEAGUE+" (Plus League) was founded by a former basketball player Charles "Blackie" Chen. The following year, a third professional basketball league "T1 League" was established by the former manager of the American basketball alliance NBA in the Taiwan area Guang-Zhong Guan. The two newly established professional basketball leagues sparks competition in players and resources but were said to have pushed the basketball industry in Taiwan to a new peak. While teams in both leagues were dedicated to recruiting the best local players, they were both eyeing and investing in recruiting foreign players. In 2022, renowned NBA star Dwight Howard was recruited by the team Taoyuan Leopards within T1 League, marking history in Taiwan's basketball.

Internationally, the Chinese Taipei men's national basketball team won the silver medal at the Asian Championship in 1960 and 1963 and bronze in 1973 and 1989. The Chinese Taipei women's national basketball team won the silver medal at the 1972 Asian Basketball Championship for Women. The team won bronze at the event in 1965, 1968, 1970, 1974, 1986, 1988, 1999 and 2005. Further, the women's team won silver at the 2006 Asian Games.

=== Football ===
Football was introduced to Taiwan in 1916 by the British Presbyterian missionary Edward Band, who moved to Taiwan to serve as the principal of Tainan's Chang Jung High School. The Chang Jung High School team is considered to be the first football team in Taiwan with all current teams being in some way descendent of it.

Due to Japanese (long before the J. League made football popular in Japan) and American influence, football has not been as popular as baseball or basketball in Taiwan, although it has a history of success at the Asian level. Football is run by the Chinese Taipei Football Association (CTFA), which in turn runs the national teams for men and women and several domestic competitions.

The top league of football, the Taiwan Football Premier League (former Intercity Football League), is relatively semi-professional and dominated by two teams, Tatung F.C. from Taipei and Taipower F.C. from Kaohsiung. As an incentive, the Asian Football Confederation runs the AFC President's Cup continental club competition for countries where football is relatively undeveloped, and these two clubs often take turns representing Taiwan in it.

There are many amateur football clubs run by foreign expatriates within Taiwan, but they run their own amateur competitions. An example is 100 Pacers F.C. in Kaohsiung. At youth level, there are Highschool Football League, National Youth Cup, and football program in the National High School Games.

=== Softball ===
Taiwan also has a strong women's softball team. The Chinese Taipei women's national softball team is currently ranked no.3 in the world based on the WBSC Rankings. The team recently won bronze medal at the 2022 World Games.

=== Volleyball ===
Since 2004, the Chinese Taipei Volleyball Association has hosted the Top Volleyball League (TVL) every year. In 2025, the Taiwan Professional Volleyball League (TPVL) was established.

The Chinese Taipei women's national volleyball team made two appearances on the FIVB Women's Volleyball World Championship, first in 1990. The national team re-entered the FIVB Women's World Championship in 2006. To everyone's surprise, the 23rd-ranked team gained its first-ever victory over the host Japan (7th) on the opening day, followed by defeating South Korea (8th), Poland (9th), Kenya (11th), and Costa Rica (33rd) in the first round. However, after a good start of five consecutive victories, the team could not continue its impressive form and eventually took 12th place. In December, the same squad attended the 2006 Asian Games held in Doha, Qatar. Although the team lost to South Korea and China in the preliminary round, they later beat Kazakhstan and Thailand to win the bronze medal, the first ever medal in women's volleyball at the Asian Games.

== Individual sports ==
=== Archery ===
The sport spread in Taiwan for recreation when a nationwide archery association was founded in 1973. Since the 1980s, The Chinese Taipei Archery Association has aimed for medals in international competitions. In 1999, the Chinese Taipei archery team won gold at the World Archery Championships in the women's compound team event. In 2002, Yuan Shu-chi became the first Taiwanese gold medalist in archery at the Asian Games by defeating two South Korean archers in the women's individual event. Two years later, Taiwanese archery teams won Olympic medals for the first time at the 2004 Summer Olympics.

In 2019, the Chinese Enterprise Archery League was launched. Taiwanese competitors regularly participate in archery tournaments, occasionally winning medals in major sporting events. The Taiwanese archery team is one of the top teams in the world. One of the best results occurred when the team won both the women's recurve and compound team events, and Lei Chien-ying clinched the individual title in women's recurve at the 2019 World Archery Championships. In 2025, the women's recurve team won its second title at the World Archery Championships.

=== Badminton ===
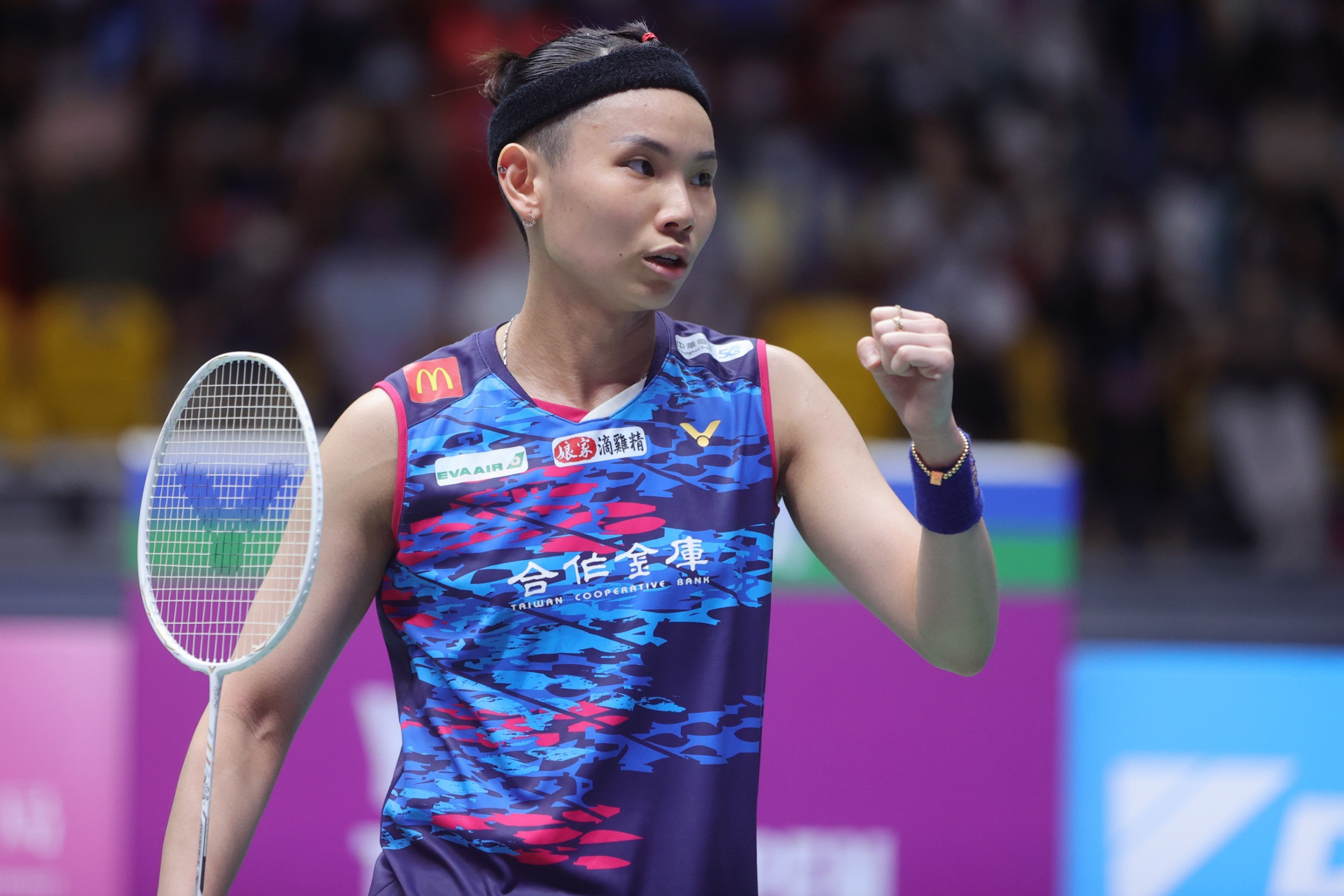
Tai Tzu-ying at the 2022 Taipei Open

Badminton was introduced to Taiwan in late 1940s after World War II, and a nationwide badminton association was founded in 1956. The National Badminton Association of the Republic of China joined BWF in 1957, and annual Taipei Open was inaugurated in 1980. Since badminton does not require very expensive equipment and is relatively simple to play, many Taiwanese also enjoy playing badminton as a recreational sport or as an extra-curricular activity.

Over the years, badminton has gained popularity with the general public. In international tournaments after 2000, Cheng Wen-hsing paired with Chien Yu-chin in women's doubles and singles shuttler Cheng Shao-chieh rose on the world stage. The younger generation of Taiwanese badminton players such as Chou Tien-chen and world No. 1 Tai Tzu-ying in the BWF World Tour helped spur interest in the sport and contributed to the surge in popularity. In 2021, badminton duo Lee Yang and Wang Chi-lin won gold medal at the Tokyo Olympics. They won gold again at the 2024 Paris Olympics, the first pair in badminton history to win the doubles for men twice.

=== Cycling ===
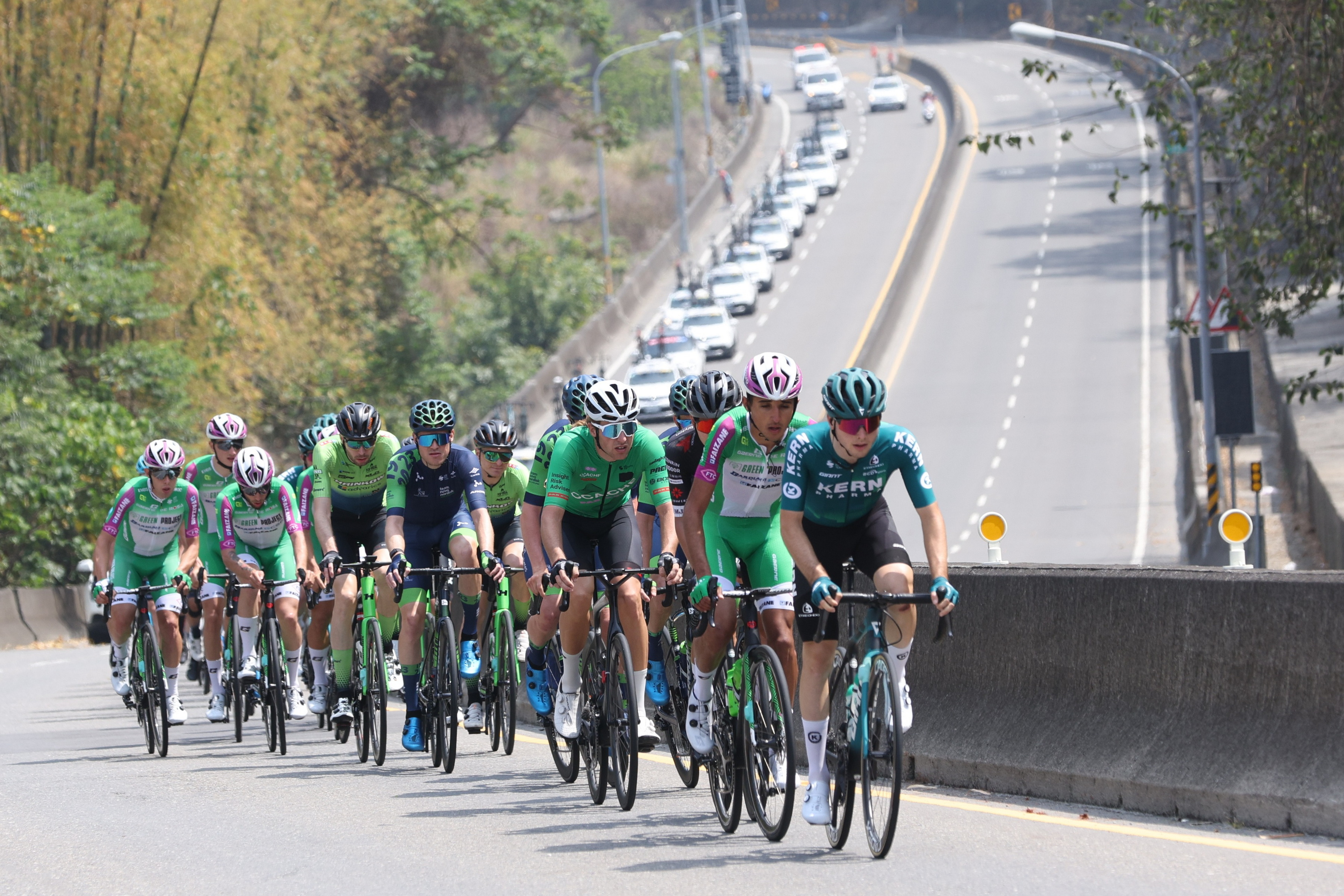
2023 Tour de Taiwan

The Tour de Taiwan is a road cycling race held since 1978 and has been part of the UCI Asia Tour since 2005. Riding a bicycle around the island of Taiwan is popular in Taiwanese culture.

=== Golf ===
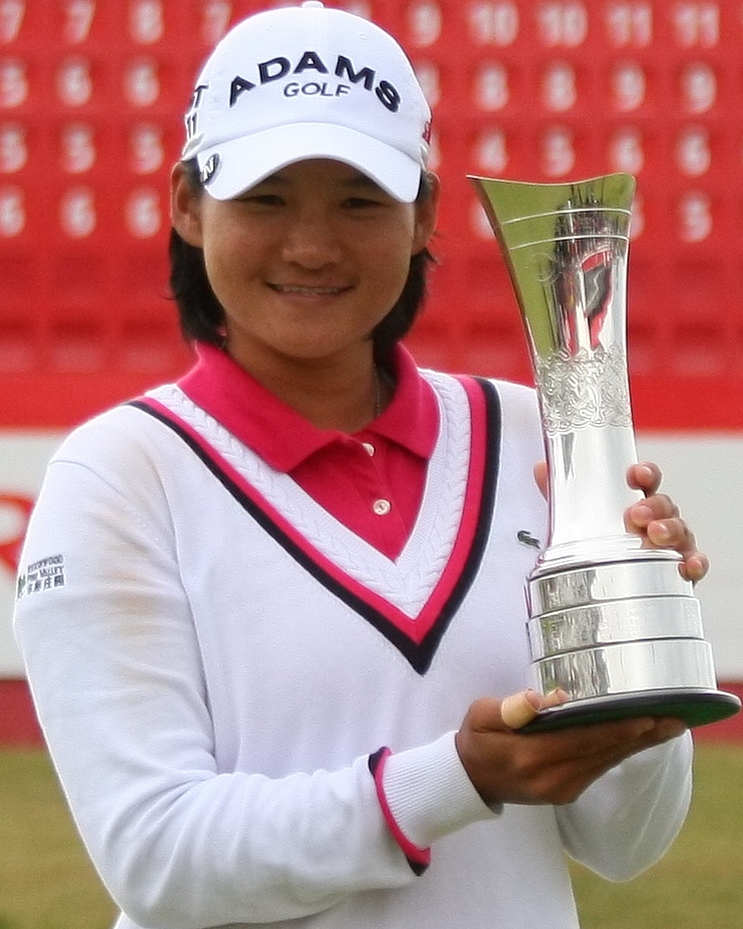
Yani Tseng with the 2011 Women's British Open trophy

Golf was introduced during the Japanese colonial period, with the first golf club opening in 1919. Professionally, Lu Liang-Huan won the French Open in 1971, marking the first Taiwanese victory on the European Tour. In 1982, Chen Tze-chung became the first professional golfer from Taiwan to earn a PGA Tour card and he became the first Taiwanese golfer to win on the PGA Tour with a win at the 1987 Los Angeles Open. After a period of decline, golf has become increasingly popular in Taiwan. Yani Tseng was the 2008 LPGA Rookie of the Year. She is the youngest player to win five major golf championships—either men's majors or women's majors—and was ranked number 1 in the Women's World Golf Rankings from 2011 to 2013. C.T. Pan became the second Taiwanese player to win a PGA Tour title in 2019 and became the first Taiwanese Olympic medalist in golf at the 2020 Summer Olympics.

The Taiwan Masters and Yeangder Tournament Players Championship have been part of the Asian Tour since 2000 and 2010 respectively. Previously, the European Tour's BMW Asian Open was held in Taiwan in 2001 and 2002. The LPGA Taiwan Championship was an LPGA Tour tournament from 2011 to 2019.

=== Marathon ===
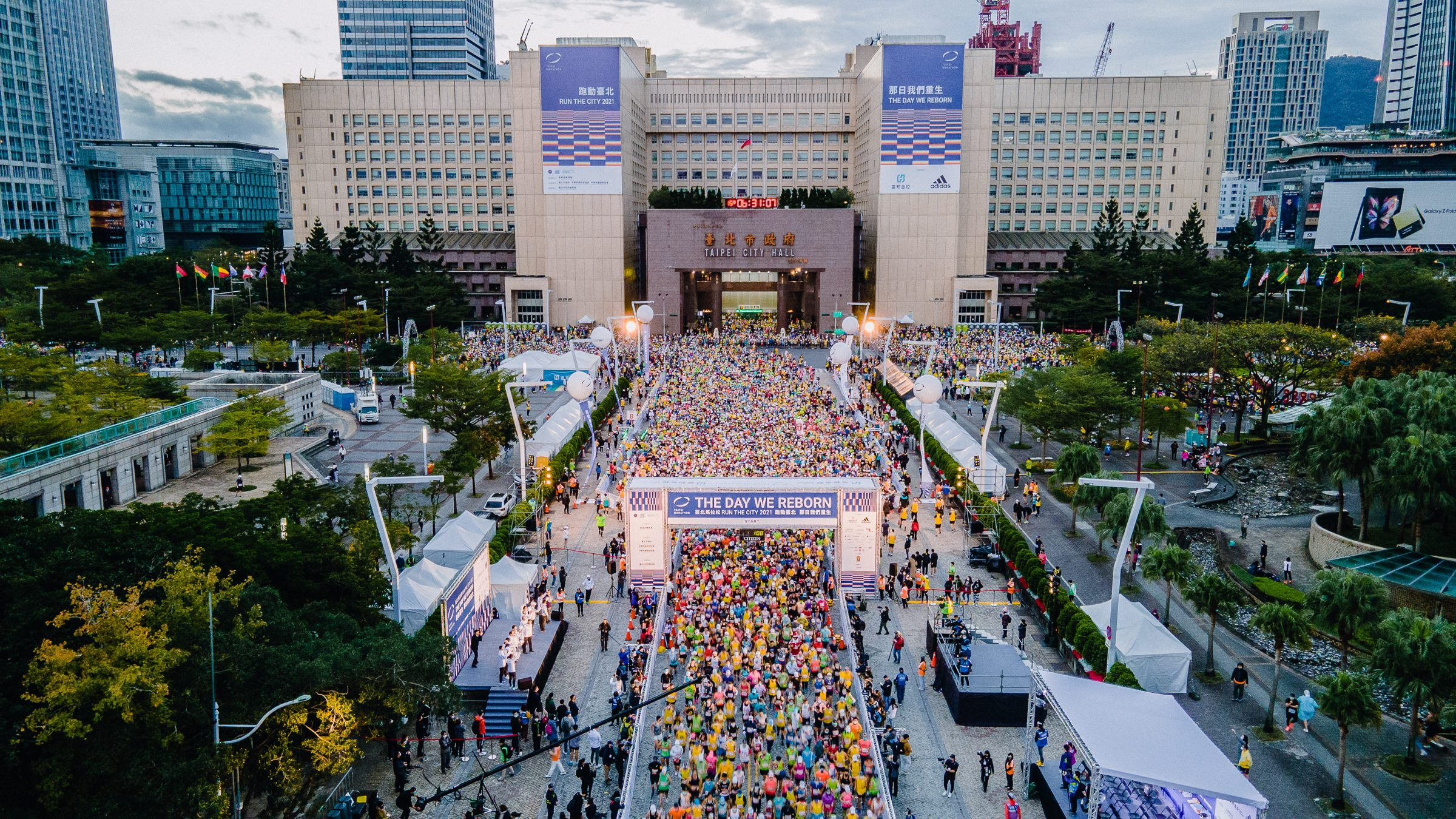
2021 Taipei Marathon

Marathon races are held in many places in Taiwan each year. Many marathoners from all over the world participate in these races. Notably, the New Taipei City Wan Jin Shi Marathon and Taipei Marathon are two World Athletics Label Road Races in Taiwan, being categorized as Gold Label.

=== Table tennis ===
Taiwan has a long history of a strong international presence in table tennis. Chen Pao-pei was a gold medalist in the women's singles at the Asian Table Tennis Championships in 1953 and a gold medalist with Chiang Tsai-yun in the 1957 women's doubles and women's team events. Li Kou-tin won the men's singles at the 1958 Asian Games. Playing for Taiwan, Chen Jing won a bronze medal at the 1996 Summer Olympics and a silver medal at the 2000 Summer Olympics.

More recently, Chiang Peng-lung won the men's singles title at the 2000 Asian Championships. Chuang Chih-yuan won the ITTF Pro Tour Grand Finals in 2002. Chuang was ranked world No. 3 at the peak of his career and remained in or near the top ten for over 15 years. In 2013, Chuang paired with Chen Chien-an and won the men's doubles title at the World Table Tennis Championships—the first title won by Taiwanese players at the event. Other younger players, such as Cheng I-ching and Lin Yun-ju, have both medaled in the singles events at the World Cup. In addition, Cheng and Lin composed a mixed doubles pair and won a bronze medal at the 2020 Summer Olympics.

=== Taekwondo ===
Taekwondo was introduced to Taiwan in 1966 for military training and has become a mature and successful combat sport in Taiwan. Taiwanese competitors regularly participate in taekwondo tournaments from Asian Games to the Olympics. The first two Olympic gold medals won by Taiwanese athletes belong to the sport. In the 2004 Olympics, Chen Shih-hsin and Chu Mu-yen won gold medals in the women's flyweight event and the men's flyweight event, respectively. Subsequent taekwondo competitors have strengthened Taiwan's taekwondo culture.

=== Tennis ===
Taiwanese tennis players have achieved notable results and rankings in the 21st century. In 2004, Lu Yen-hsun was the first player from Taiwan to break into the Top 100 of the ATP rankings. Jimmy Wang followed him in 2006, reaching No. 85. Lu peaked at No. 33 in 2010. The same year, he reached the quarterfinal of Wimbledon. Lu holds the record for the most titles in the ATP Challenger Tour, with 29 wins.

Hsieh Su-wei is Taiwan's most successful player, having been ranked within the top 25 in singles in the WTA rankings. Hsieh has won seven Grand Slam titles and a year-end championship in doubles. She won Wimbledon in 2013 and Roland Garros in 2014, as well as the 2013 WTA Tour Championships, all with Peng Shuai, and became joint No. 1 in doubles with Peng in 2014. She won her second Wimbledon doubles title at the 2019 championships with Barbora Strýcová. In 2021, she won her third Wimbledon doubles title with Elise Mertens and won her fourth with Strýcová in 2023.

The sisters Chan Yung-jan (Latisha Chan) and Chan Hao-ching are doubles specialists. They won the 2019 Toray Pan Pacific Open, beating Hsieh and her sister Hsieh Yu-chieh in the final, to record their 14th WTA tournament together. It is the second-highest number of tournament wins for a pair of sisters after the Williams sisters. Latisha Chan has won four Grand Slam titles. She won the doubles title at the 2017 US Open with Martina Hingis, and the mixed doubles at the 2018 and 2019 French Open and 2019 Wimbledon Championships, all with Ivan Dodig. She became joint No. 1 in doubles with Hingis in 2017, and returned to the top in August 2018.

Other notable players include Tseng Chun-hsin, Jason Jung, Chuang Chia-jung and Wang Shi-ting.

== See also ==
- List of sporting events in Taiwan
- List of stadiums in Taiwan
