= Chinese baseball =

Chinese baseball may refer to:

- Kickball, a baseball-like game in which a ball is kicked instead
- Baseball in China
- Baseball in the Republic of China
