= Taichung Win Streak =

Taiwanese men's volleyball club

- Full name: Taichung Win Streak Men's Volleyball Team
- Founded: 2022
- Ground: National Taiwan University of Sport Gymnasium
- Head coach: Chien Wei-lun
- Captain: Jhang Yun-Liang
- League: Taiwan Professional Volleyball League
- 2025–26: Playoffs

The Taichung Win Streak Men's Volleyball Team (Note: Alternatively spelled as WinStreak; stylized as Win+Streak, Win+ Streak or Win^{+} Streak) (Chinese: 臺中連莊男子排球隊) is a Taiwanese volleyball team based in Taichung, Taiwan. They compete in the Taiwan Professional Volleyball League.

== History ==
In 2014, the Brilliant Footwear Corporation took part in Top Volleyball League sponsoring Taichung Lien Chuang. However, the team had faced operational issues after the season, forcing the Brilliant Footwear Corporation withdraw their sponsorship to the team.

In 2022, the Brilliant Footwear Corporation chairman Lien Hua-Jung announced their comeback to the Top Volleyball League with a brand new established team, Win Streak. The Win Streak signed Philippine national team player Bryan Bagunas and Malaysian national team player Sim Jian Qin in their inaugural season. On March 4, 2023, the Win Streak clinched its first regular season title. On March 27, 2023, the Win Streak won their first champion after defeating Pingtung Taipower in the Finals. On March 31, 2024, the Win Streak won their second consecutive champion. On March 24, 2025, the Win Streak won their third consecutive champion.

In 2025, Taichung Win Streak joined the new-established Taiwan Professional Volleyball League, becoming one of the four teams for the inaugural season.

== Team ==
Squad as of September 2026

Team roster – season 2025/26
No.	Name	Date of birth	Position
3	(Taiwan) Ko Tsung-fu	9 July 2000 (age 26)	middle blocker
4	(Taiwan) Chuang Che-yu	22 December 1999 (age 26)	setter
7	(Brazil) Jardel Oliveira	4 February 2002 (age 24)	outside hitter
8	(Russia) Nikkel Mikhail	1 October 1997 (age 29)	outside hitter
9	(Cambodia) Veasna Voeurn	5 May 2001 (age 25)	outside hitter
10	(Taiwan) Shih Tsung-yu	2 November 2002 (age 23)	middle blocker
11	(Taiwan) Wu Tsung-hsuan	9 July 1994 (age 32)	opposite
13	(Taiwan) Lin Kuan-chou	9 May 2000 (age 26)	outside hitter
14	(Taiwan) Tsai Ping-yen	17 September 2002 (age 24)	middle blocker
15	(Taiwan) Wang Ping-hsun	28 May 2001 (age 25)	middle blocker
16	(Taiwan) Jang Yun-liang (c)	28 August 1998 (age 28)	libero
17	(Thailand) Saranchit Charoensuk	20 July 1987 (age 39)	setter
18	(Taiwan) Lin Chia-wei	6 September 2003 (age 23)	setter
70	(Taiwan) Huang Pei-hung	17 September 1990 (age 36)	setter

== Honours ==
- Top Volleyball League
  (x3) 2022–23, 2023–24, 2024–25
- Win+ Streak Volleyball Invitational Tournament
  (x2) 2022, 2024
  (x1) 2023
- TFMI Cup
  (x1) 2022
  (x1) 2022

== Kit providers ==
Period	Kit provider
2022–2023	Asics; Mizuno
2023–2025	Mizuno
2025–2026	Da Village
2026–	Mizuno
