= Spicy Teacher =

2000 Taiwanese TV show

- Genre: Drama, Comedy, Anthology
- Written by: Chou Ming-Ming, Hu Ning-Yuan, Sun Fa-Chun, William Hsieh
- Directed by: Che-Shu Chang, Ko Hsin-Cheng
- Starring: William Hsieh, Ye Min-Zhi, Jade Chia, Jean Kuo, Tu Shih-Mei
- Country of origin: Republic of China (Taiwan)
- Original languages: Mandarin; Taiwanese
- No. of episodes: 198

Production
- Production locations: Taoyuan City, Taipei
- Running time: 60-90 minutes

Original release
- Network: Chinese Television System (CTS)
- Release: 1 July 2000 – 14 February 2004

Related
- Confucius (智勝鮮師); Spicy Reunion (麻辣同學會)

Spicy Teacher (simplified Chinese: 麻辣鲜师; traditional Chinese: 麻辣鮮師; pinyin: málà xiānshī; lit. 'mala fresh teacher') is a 2000 Taiwanese drama starring William Hsieh, Ye Min-Zhi, Jade Chia, Jean Kuo, Tu Shih-Mei. It is the first school life comedy in Taiwanese television, inspired by the Japanese manga series Great Teacher Onizuka (グレート・ティーチャー・オニヅカ, Gurēto Tīchā Onizuka) by Tooru Fujisawa. It is the longest broadcast school life comedy and the school life comedy series with the most episodes in Taiwan. It became the television show with the most re-runs in Taiwan. Since it is a light comedy set in high school, it became a popular show for new actors with little prior acting experience to start their careers. Various actors, such as Jerry Yan, Lan Cheng-lung, Will Pan, Ady An, and Weber Yang, later went on to become successful in the industry, so the show is often called an "Idol maker" or "Idol workshop".

== Synopsis ==
Hsu Lei (William Hsieh) is not the typical teacher. An ex-gang member, he often uses unorthodox methods to help solve the problems of his students. Along with his coworkers Dean Huang (Ye Min-Zhi), Ms. Tong (Jade Chia), and Ms. Wan (Jean Ku)), Hsu tries to provide the best education, whether in academics or life, to his students, including Lu Xiaoman (Tu Shih-Mei) and many others.

== Cast ==
- William Hsieh as Hsu Lei
- Ye Min-Zhi as Dean Huang
- Jade Chia as Ms. Tong
- Jean Kuo as Ms. Wan

== Production ==
Season 1 to 3 were filmed at Paul Hsu Senior High School in Guishan District, Taoyuan City.

Season 4 and 5 were filmed at Dunxu High School of Industry and Commerce in Beitou District, Taipei.

On 30 June 2003, the show title changed to New Spicy Teacher (新麻辣鮮師).

On 8 November 2003, the show title changed to Spicy School - Clever Teacher (麻辣學園妙鮮師).

== Film ==
A movie based on the series, Spicy Teacher (王牌教師 麻辣出擊) was released on August 30, 2018. It is set ten years after the original series.
