= Surfing in Taiwan =

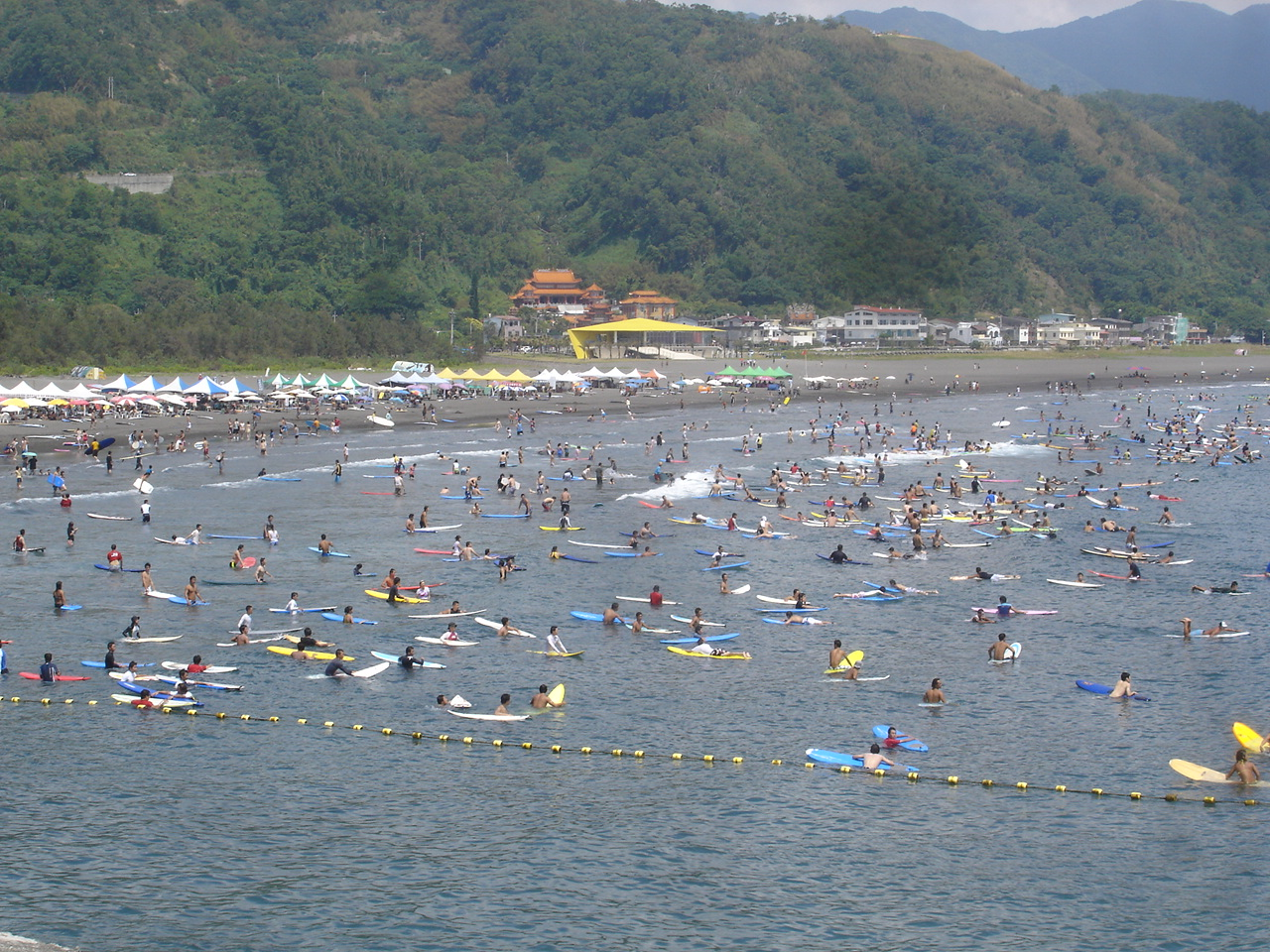
Surfers in Wai'ao Bay, Toucheng Township, Yilan County

Surfing is a relatively new sport in Taiwan, though it has quickly gained popularity.

== History ==
Taiwan(R.O.C) government placed under martial law from 1949 to 1987. During this period, maritime access was limited, as the coastline was classified as a high-security zone. Jeff Sun (Sun YaoSheng, Chinese:孫耀聖 - Other names:Mao Guh, Chinese:毛哥), who began surfing in 1960s, is considered a pioneer of the sport in Taiwan.

== Location ==
The eastern shores of Taiwan face the Pacific Ocean, and serve as major locations for surfing.

== Period ==
People in Taiwan surf all year round except during the typhoon seasons, which has been prohibited by law since 2011. The prohibition period starts after the Central Weather Bureau issues land warning.

== Competitions ==
The Taiwan Open of Surfing has been held since 2010, and is sanctioned by the World Surfing League.

== See also ==
- Sports in Taiwan
