= 2022 Creamline Cool Smashers season =

Fifth season of the Creamline Cool Smashers

The 2022 Creamline Cool Smashers season was the fifth season of the Creamline Cool Smashers in the Premier Volleyball League (PVL).

== Season summary ==
This season marks Creamline's first without Thai head coach Tai Bundit, with Sherwin Meneses succeeding him. The team was assigned to Pool B for the Open Conference, in which they were able to sweep the preliminary round, 3–0 with 8 points, to earn twice-to-beat advantage going into the quarterfinals. Right away the Cool Smashers were put up against the Chery Tiggo Crossovers in a rematch of the 2021 Open Conference championship. Creamline were able to beat Chery Tiggo, 3–1, then sweeping their semifinals series against sister team Choco Mucho Flying Titans, 2–0, to advance to the championship. They would face off against rivals Petro Gazz Angels for the third time in the championship. Creamline would then also sweep Petro Gazz, 2–0, for their fourth PVL title and third in the Open Conference.

Ahead of the Invitational Conference, Creamline signed Lorie Bernardo from UP. On July 28, with a win against Chery Tiggo, Creamline clinched a berth into the semifinals. They went on to top the conference with a 5–1 record and 15 points, only losing to the Cignal HD Spikers on July 21. In the semifinals, the team won their first three matches. Following KingWhale Taipei's win over the PLDT High Speed Hitters, Creamline clinched a spot in the championship. However, they failed to compete a semifinals sweep after losing to KingWhale in the final match, who they would meet again in the championship. Creamline were able to reclaim victory in the championship match, beating KingWhale, 3–0, for their fifth PVL title and becoming the PVL's first Invitational Conference champions.

With titles in the first two conferences of the season, Creamline had the opportunity to clinch the league's first Grand Slam with a championship in the Reinforced Conference. The team signed Turkish player Yeliz Başa as their import for the conference. Once again, Creamline dominated the preliminary round with a 7–1 record and 22 points, only falling to the F2 Logistics Cargo Movers on November 8. The Cool Smashers were bound for the semifinals and finished with a 2–1 record. However, a five-set win in their final match against Chery Tiggo meant that Creamline finished with 5 points, one short of both Cignal and Petro Gazz. The team settled for third in the semifinals, failing to advance to the championship for the first time since 2017 and ending their chance at a Grand Slam. In the third-place match, they would sweep the series against Chery Tiggo, 2–0, to end the season with a Reinforced Conference bronze medal, but during the third set of the second match, captain Alyssa Valdez suffered an injury.

== Roster ==
Creamline Cool Smashers
| Number | Player | Position | Height | Birth date | School |
|---|---|---|---|---|---|
| 1 | (Philippines) Kyle Angela Negrito | Setter | 1.72 m (5 ft 8 in) | December 15, 1996 (age 28) | Far Eastern University |
| 2 | (Philippines) Alyssa Valdez (C) | Outside hitter | 1.75 m (5 ft 9 in) | June 29, 1993 (age 32) | Ateneo de Manila University |
| 3 | (Philippines) Fille Cainglet-Cayetano | Outside hitter | 1.68 m (5 ft 6 in) | January 30, 1990 (age 35) | Ateneo de Manila University |
| 5 | (Philippines) (Japan) Risa Sato | Middle blocker | 1.76 m (5 ft 9 in) | October 4, 1994 (age 31) | National University |
| 7 | (Philippines) Michele Theresa Gumabao | Opposite hitter | 1.75 m (5 ft 9 in) | September 2, 1992 (age 33) | De La Salle University |
| 8 | (Philippines) Jorella Marie de Jesus | Libero | 1.57 m (5 ft 2 in) | August 17, 1993 (age 32) | Ateneo de Manila University |
| 10 | (Philippines) Maria Paulina Soriano | Middle blocker | 1.70 m (5 ft 7 in) | December 31, 1991 (age 33) | Adamson University |
| 11 | (Philippines) Kyla Llana Atienza | Libero | 1.67 m (5 ft 6 in) | April 12, 1997 (age 28) | Far Eastern University |
| 12 | (Philippines) Julia Melissa Morado-De Guzman | Setter | 1.70 m (5 ft 7 in) | May 10, 1995 (age 30) | Ateneo de Manila University |
| 13 | (Philippines) Celine Elaiza Domingo | Middle blocker | 1.75 m (5 ft 9 in) | April 20, 1999 (age 26) | Far Eastern University |
| 14 | (Philippines) Jeanette Panaga | Middle blocker | 1.78 m (5 ft 10 in) | July 25, 1994 (age 31) | De La Salle–College of Saint Benilde |
| 16 | (Philippines) Rizza Jane Mandapat | Opposite hitter | 1.73 m (5 ft 8 in) | February 28, 1994 (age 31) | National University |
| 17 | (Philippines) Rosemarie Vargas | Outside hitter | 1.70 m (5 ft 7 in) | December 12, 1992 (age 32) | Far Eastern University |
| 18 | (Philippines) Diana Mae Carlos | Opposite hitter | 1.70 m (5 ft 7 in) | July 7, 1998 (age 27) | University of the Philippines |
| 19 | (Philippines) Lorie Lyn Bernardo | Middle blocker | 1.82 m (6 ft 0 in) | August 1, 2000 (age 25) | University of the Philippines |
| 21 | (Turkey) Yeliz Başa (I) | Outside hitter | 1.88 m (6 ft 2 in) | August 13, 1987 (age 38) | |
| 23 | (Philippines) Jessica Margarett Galanza | Outside hitter | 1.70 m (5 ft 7 in) | November 28, 1996 (age 28) | Adamson University |

Coaching staff

- Head coach:
  Sherwin Meneses
- Assistant coach:
  Karlo Martin Santos

Team staff

- Team manager:
  Ma. Carlota Celda
  Alan Acero
- Trainers:
  Mark Christopher Caron
  Ariel Morado Jr.

Medical staff

- Physical therapist:
  Anna Liza Demegillo

== Open Conference ==
=== Preliminary round ===
==== Pool B standings ====
| Pos | Team | Pld | W | L | Pts | SW | SL | SR | SPW | SPL | SPR | Qualification |
|---|---|---|---|---|---|---|---|---|---|---|---|---|
| 1 | Creamline Cool Smashers | 3 | 3 | 0 | 8 | 9 | 2 | 4.500 | 261 | 207 | 1.261 | Quarterfinals with twice to beat advantage |
| 2 | Petro Gazz Angels | 3 | 2 | 1 | 7 | 8 | 5 | 1.600 | 294 | 278 | 1.058 | Quarterfinals with twice to beat advantage |
| 3 | PLDT High Speed Hitters | 3 | 1 | 2 | 3 | 4 | 6 | 0.667 | 219 | 235 | 0.932 | Quarterfinals |
| 4 | BaliPure Purest Water Defenders | 3 | 0 | 3 | 0 | 1 | 9 | 0.111 | 195 | 249 | 0.783 | Quarterfinals |

Source: PhilSports.ph

==== Match log ====
2022 PVL Open Conference preliminary round match log
Total: 3–0 (8 points)
March: 3–0 (8 points)

| Match | Date | Opponent | Sets | Total | Location Attendance | Record | Pts | Report |
|---|---|---|---|---|---|---|---|---|
| 1 | March 17, 2022 | PLDT | 3–0 | 75–56 | Paco Arena; 41 | 1–0 | 3 | P2 |
| 2 | March 21, 2022 | BaliPure | 3–0 | 75–49 | Paco Arena; 32 | 2–0 | 6 | P2 |
| 3 | March 23, 2022 | Petro Gazz | 3–2 | 111–102 | Paco Arena; 42 | 3–0 | 8 | P2 |

=== Final round ===
==== Bracket ====
Quarterfinals
March 28
A1 Cignal | 3
B4 BaliPure | 0
March 29
B2 Petro Gazz | 3
A3 F2 Logistics | 1
March 28
B1 Creamline | 3
A4 Chery Tiggo | 1
March 29
A2 Choco Mucho | 3
B3 PLDT | 2

Semifinals
April 1–4
Cignal | 3 | 2 | 1
Petro Gazz | 0 | 3 | 3
April 1–3
Creamline | 3 | 3
Choco Mucho | 1 | 1

Championship
April 6–8
Petro Gazz | 0 | 0
Creamline | 3 | 3
Third place
April 6–8
Cignal | 1 | 3 | 1.02
Choco Mucho | 3 | 1 | 0.98

==== Match log ====
2022 PVL Open Conference final round match log
Total: 5–0 (15 points)
Quarterfinals: 1–0 (3 points)

| Match | Date | Opponent | Sets | Total | Location Attendance | Series | Report |
|---|---|---|---|---|---|---|---|
| 1 | March 28, 2022 | Chery Tiggo | 3–1 | 98–76 | Filoil Flying V Centre; 2,223 | 1–0 | P2 |

Semifinals: 2–0 (6 points)

| Match | Date | Opponent | Sets | Total | Location Attendance | Series | Report |
|---|---|---|---|---|---|---|---|
| 1 | April 1, 2022 | Choco Mucho | 3–1 | 92–73 | Filoil Flying V Centre; 5,368 | 1–0 | P2 |
| 2 | April 3, 2022 | Choco Mucho | 3–1 | 98–77 | SM Mall of Asia Arena; 16,877 | 2–0 | P2 |

Championship: 2–0 (6 points)

| Match | Date | Opponent | Sets | Total | Location Attendance | Series | Report |
|---|---|---|---|---|---|---|---|
| 1 | April 6, 2022 | Petro Gazz | 3–1 | 105–83 | SM Mall of Asia Arena; 14,573 | 1–0 | P2 |
| 2 | April 8, 2022 | Petro Gazz | 3–1 | 90–82 | Ynares Center; 8,231 | 2–0 | P2 |

== Invitational Conference ==
=== Preliminary round ===
==== Standings ====
| Pos | Team | Pld | W | L | Pts | SW | SL | SR | SPW | SPL | SPR | Qualification |
|---|---|---|---|---|---|---|---|---|---|---|---|---|
| 1 | Creamline Cool Smashers | 6 | 5 | 1 | 15 | 16 | 5 | 3.200 | 514 | 439 | 1.171 | Final round |
| 2 | PLDT High Speed Hitters | 6 | 4 | 2 | 12 | 14 | 10 | 1.400 | 533 | 487 | 1.094 | Final round |
| 3 | Cignal HD Spikers | 6 | 4 | 2 | 11 | 14 | 10 | 1.400 | 531 | 520 | 1.021 | Final round |
| 4 | Army Black Mamba Lady Troopers | 6 | 3 | 3 | 9 | 11 | 11 | 1.000 | 483 | 504 | 0.958 | Final round |
| 5 | Petro Gazz Angels | 6 | 2 | 4 | 7 | 10 | 13 | 0.769 | 507 | 517 | 0.981 | |

==== Match log ====
2022 PVL Invitational Conference preliminary round match log
Total: 5–1 (15 points)
July: 5–1 (15 points)

| Match | Date | Opponent | Sets | Total | Location Attendance | Record | Pts | Report |
|---|---|---|---|---|---|---|---|---|
| 1 | July 12, 2022 | Petro Gazz | 3–1 | 98–89 | Filoil Flying V Centre; 1,631 | 1–0 | 3 | P2 |
| 2 | July 16, 2022 | PLDT | 3–0 | 75–59 | Filoil Flying V Centre; 2,751 | 2–0 | 6 | P2 |
| 3 | July 21, 2022 | Cignal | 1–3 | 92–90 | Santa Rosa Sports Complex; 5,436 | 3–0 | 9 | P2 |
| 4 | July 23, 2022 | Choco Mucho | 3–0 | 75–58 | SM Mall of Asia Arena; 15,237 | 3–1 | 9 | P2 |
| 5 | July 28, 2022 | Chery Tiggo | 3–1 | 99–85 | Filoil EcoOil Centre; 798 | 4–1 | 12 | P2 |
| 6 | July 30, 2022 | Army | 3–0 | 75–58 | Filoil EcoOil Centre; 2,900 | 5–1 | 15 | P2 |

=== Final round ===
==== Semifinals standings ====
| Pos | Team | Pld | W | L | Pts | SW | SL | SR | SPW | SPL | SPR | Qualification |
|---|---|---|---|---|---|---|---|---|---|---|---|---|
| 1 | KingWhale Taipei | 4 | 4 | 0 | 10 | 12 | 5 | 2.400 | 381 | 351 | 1.085 | Championship match |
| 2 | Creamline Cool Smashers | 4 | 3 | 1 | 9 | 11 | 6 | 1.833 | 378 | 346 | 1.092 | Championship match |
| 3 | PLDT High Speed Hitters | 4 | 2 | 2 | 8 | 10 | 7 | 1.429 | 375 | 365 | 1.027 | 3rd place match |
| 4 | Cignal HD Spikers | 4 | 1 | 3 | 2 | 5 | 11 | 0.455 | 335 | 364 | 0.920 | 3rd place match |
| 5 | Army Black Mamba Lady Troopers | 4 | 0 | 4 | 1 | 3 | 12 | 0.250 | 318 | 367 | 0.866 | |

==== Match log ====
2022 PVL Invitational Conference final round match log
Total: 4–1 (12 points)
Semifinals: 3–1 (9 points)

| Match | Date | Opponent | Sets | Total | Location Attendance | Record | Pts | Report |
|---|---|---|---|---|---|---|---|---|
| 1 | August 4, 2022 | Army | 3–1 | 98–82 | Ynares Center; 1,241 | 1–0 | 3 | P2 |
| 2 | August 6, 2022 | PLDT | 3–2 | 112–104 | Ynares Center; 1,955 | 2–0 | 5 | P2 |
| 3 | August 8, 2022 | Cignal | 3–0 | 75–54 | SM Mall of Asia Arena; 1,273 | 3–0 | 8 | P2 |
| 4 | August 12, 2022 | KingWhale | 2–3 | 93–106 | Filoil EcoOil Centre; 1,734 | 3–1 | 9 | P2 |

Championship: 1–0 (3 points)

| Date | Opponent | Sets | Total | Location Attendance | Report |
|---|---|---|---|---|---|
| August 14, 2022 | KingWhale | 3–0 | 75–48 | SM Mall of Asia Arena; 13,589 | P2 |

== Reinforced Conference ==
=== Preliminary round ===
==== Standings ====
| Pos | Team | Pld | W | L | Pts | SW | SL | SR | SPW | SPL | SPR | Qualification |
|---|---|---|---|---|---|---|---|---|---|---|---|---|
| 1 | Creamline Cool Smashers | 8 | 7 | 1 | 22 | 23 | 10 | 2.300 | 782 | 700 | 1.117 | Semifinals |
| 2 | Chery Tiggo Crossovers | 8 | 6 | 2 | 16 | 21 | 14 | 1.500 | 764 | 764 | 1.000 | Semifinals |
| 3 | Petro Gazz Angels | 8 | 5 | 3 | 15 | 18 | 12 | 1.500 | 703 | 617 | 1.139 | Semifinals |
| 4 | Cignal HD Spikers | 8 | 5 | 3 | 14 | 18 | 14 | 1.286 | 718 | 708 | 1.014 | Semifinals |
| 5 | F2 Logistics Cargo Movers | 8 | 4 | 4 | 11 | 15 | 14 | 1.071 | 742 | 709 | 1.047 | |

==== Match log ====
2022 PVL Reinforced Conference preliminary round match log
Total: 7–1 (22 points)
October: 4–0 (12 points)

| Match | Date | Opponent | Sets | Total | Location Attendance | Record | Pts | Report |
|---|---|---|---|---|---|---|---|---|
| 1 | October 13, 2022 | PLDT | 3–1 | 101–90 | PhilSports Arena; 5,200 | 1–0 | 3 | P2 |
| 2 | October 18, 2022 | Petro Gazz | 3–1 | 93–87 | PhilSports Arena; 1,246 | 2–0 | 6 | P2 |
| 3 | October 22, 2022 | Cignal | 3–1 | 97–77 | Santa Rosa Sports Complex; 5,521 | 3–0 | 9 | P2 |
| 4 | October 27, 2022 | Akari | 3–1 | 98–77 | PhilSports Arena; 1,000 | 4–0 | 12 | P2 |

November: 3–1 (10 points)

| Match | Date | Opponent | Sets | Total | Location Attendance | Record | Pts | Report |
|---|---|---|---|---|---|---|---|---|
| 5 | November 5, 2022 | Chery Tiggo | 3–1 | 102–90 | Santa Rosa Sports Complex; 5,936 | 5–0 | 15 | P2 |
| 6 | November 8, 2022 | F2 Logistics | 2–3 | 100–110 | Smart Araneta Coliseum; 8,595 | 5–1 | 16 | P2 |
| 7 | November 12, 2022 | Army | 3–1 | 98–78 | Smart Araneta Coliseum; 2,370 | 6–1 | 19 | P2 |
| 8 | November 17, 2022 | Choco Mucho | 3–1 | 93–91 | SM Mall of Asia Arena; 19,157 | 7–1 | 22 | P2 |

=== Final round ===
==== Semifinals standings ====
| Pos | Team | Pld | W | L | Pts | SW | SL | SR | SPW | SPL | SPR | Qualification |
|---|---|---|---|---|---|---|---|---|---|---|---|---|
| 1 | Cignal HD Spikers | 3 | 2 | 1 | 6 | 7 | 4 | 1.750 | 260 | 258 | 1.008 | Championship series |
| 2 | Petro Gazz Angels | 3 | 2 | 1 | 6 | 6 | 4 | 1.500 | 239 | 201 | 1.189 | Championship series |
| 3 | Creamline Cool Smashers | 3 | 2 | 1 | 5 | 7 | 5 | 1.400 | 266 | 251 | 1.060 | 3rd place series |
| 4 | Chery Tiggo Crossovers | 3 | 0 | 3 | 1 | 2 | 9 | 0.222 | 197 | 252 | 0.782 | 3rd place series |

==== Match log ====
2022 PVL Reinforced Conference final round match log
Total: 4–1 (11 points)
Semifinals: 2–1 (5 points)

| Match | Date | Opponent | Sets | Total | Location Attendance | Record | Pts | Report |
|---|---|---|---|---|---|---|---|---|
| 1 | November 24, 2022 | Petro Gazz | 3–0 | 75–64 | PhilSports Arena; 2,813 | 1–0 | 3 | P2 |
| 2 | November 27, 2022 | Cignal | 1–3 | 92–101 | Smart Araneta Coliseum; 6,583 | 1–1 | 3 | P2 |
| 3 | November 29, 2022 | Chery Tiggo | 3–2 | 99–86 | PhilSports Arena; 3,195 | 2–1 | 5 | P2 |

3rd-place match: 2–0 (6 points)

| Match | Date | Opponent | Sets | Total | Location Attendance | Series | Report |
|---|---|---|---|---|---|---|---|
| 1 | December 1, 2022 | Chery Tiggo | 3–1 | 97–71 | Smart Araneta Coliseum; 2,965 | 1–0 | P2 |
| 2 | December 6, 2022 | Chery Tiggo | 3–1 | 98–80 | PhilSports Arena; 3,913 | 2–0 | P2 |

== Transactions ==
=== Additions ===
| Player | Date signed | Previous team | Ref. |
|---|---|---|---|
| Lorie Bernardo | July 1, 2022 | UP Lady Fighting Maroons (UAAP) | |
