= Taiwan Professional Volleyball League =

Volleyball league in Taiwan

- Current season, competition or edition: 2025–26 Taiwan Professional Volleyball League season
- Sport: Volleyball
- Founded: 2025; 1 year ago
- First season: 2025–26
- No. of teams: 5
- Country: Taiwan
- Continent: AVC (Asia)
- Website: www.tpvl.tw

The Taiwan Professional Volleyball League (TPVL; Chinese: 台灣職業排球聯盟) is a men's volleyball league in Taiwan.

== History ==
The Taiwan Professional Volleyball League was established in January 2025. The first ever season featuring four teams (Taipei East Power, Taoyuan Leopards, TSG SkyHawks, and Taichung Win Streak) began on 27 September 2025.

== Teams ==
TPVL teams
Team	Location
Taipei East Power	Taipei
Taoyuan Laelaps Leopards	Taoyuan
Hsinchu Collie Engineers	Hsinchu
TSG SkyHawks	Kaohsiung
Taichung Win Streak	Taichung

== See also ==
- Top Volleyball League
