= Edward Band =

English Presbyterian missionary and schoolteacher

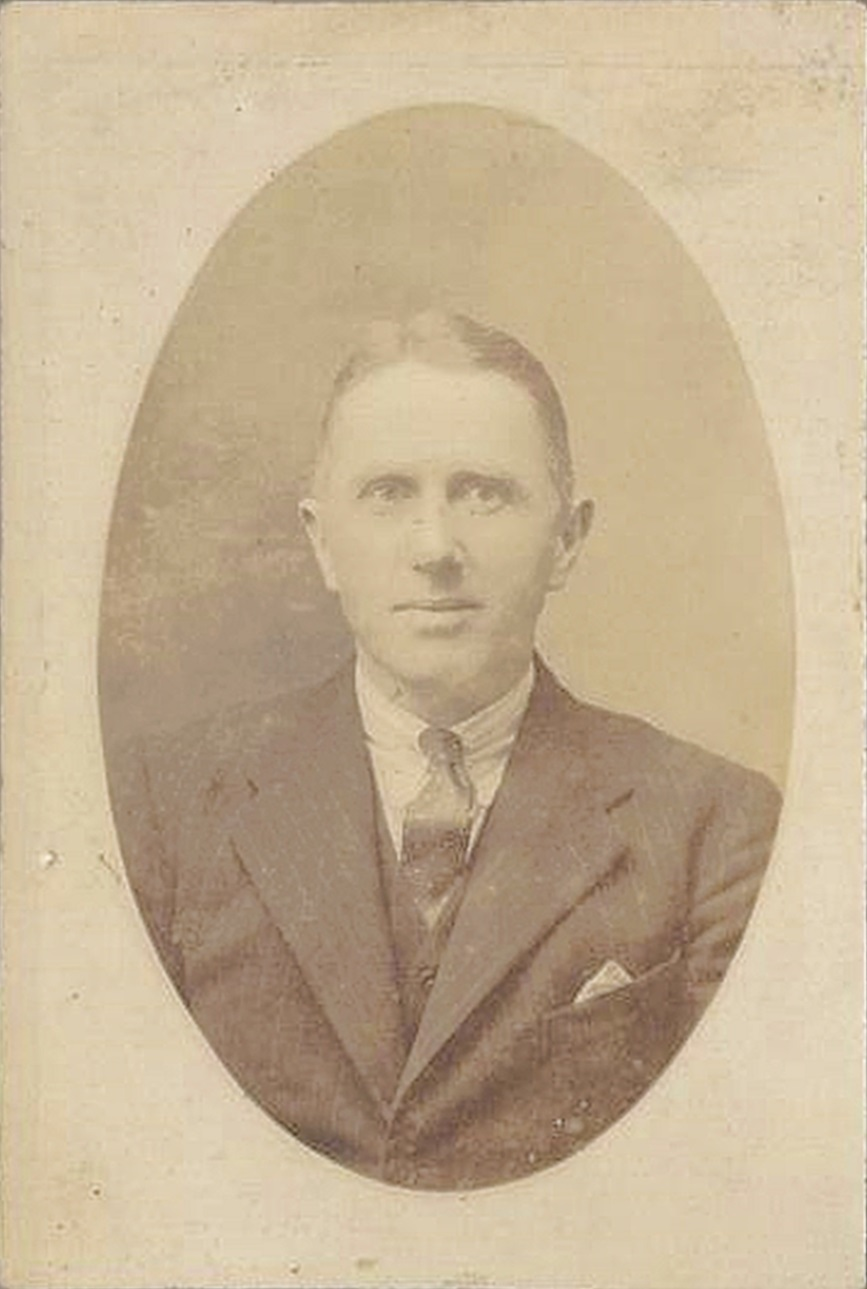
- Missionary and teacher
- Born: 7 January 1886; Birkenhead, United Kingdom
- Died: 22 March 1971 (aged 85); Bournemouth, United Kingdom
- Education: Queens' College, Cambridge
- Children: George Band

Edward Band (7 January 1886 – 22 March 1971) was an English Presbyterian missionary and schoolteacher. He spent most of his career in Taiwan, arriving in 1912 and leaving in 1940. He was the first missionary there sent to Japan to learn Japanese after the transfer of power from the Qing dynasty to the Japanese government, he spoke Japanese and Taiwanese fluently.

Band was a pupil of Birkenhead School and then went to Queens' College, Cambridge to study Mathematics before completing a theology course at Westminster College in Cambridge.

Band taught at and was eventually principal of Tainan's Presbyterian Church High School, renamed Chang Jung Senior High School in 1939, and introduced association football to the island.

Band authored several books; Barclay of Formosa (1936), a biography of fellow missionary Thomas Barclay, Working His Purpose Out (1947), a history of the English Presbyterian Mission published on its centenary in 1947, and He Brought Them Out: the Story of the Christian Movement Among the Mountain Tribes of Formosa, published by the British and Foreign Bible Society in 1949.

== Bibliography ==
- Otness, Harold M. (1999), One Thousand Westerners in Taiwan, to 1945, Taipei, Taiwan: Academia Sinica
- Kazue Mino's "Taiwan and China through the Eyes of English Presbyterian Missionaries: Focusing on the Issue of Nationalism during the Late 1920s to 1930s" compares the writings of Campbell N. Moody (1865–1940), Leslie Singleton (1897–1971), and Edward Band (1886–1971)
