= Taichung Traveler =

- Full name: Taichung Traveler Futsal Club
- Founded: 2021
- Head coach: Chen Yu-pin
- League: Formosa Futsal One
- 2024–25: Champion

The Taichung Traveler is a Taiwanese futsal club from Taichung, Taiwan. They compete in the Formosa Futsal One.

== History ==
Taichung Traveler was founded in 2021 as the six teams of the inaugural Taiwan Futsal League season. They finished 2nd place in 2021.

On February 16, 2025, they won their first champion after defeating Chiayi Tienching in Formosa Futsal One Final.

== Titles ==
=== National ===
- Formosa Futsal One (1): 2024–25

== Current squad ==
As of 11 May 2022

#	Position	Name	Nationality
1	Goalkeeper	Chuang Hsien-Kai	(Chinese Taipei)
2	Pivot	Kao Ssu-Han	(Chinese Taipei)
3	Winger	Liu Ju-Ming	(Chinese Taipei)
4	Winger	Huang Chih-Chin	(Chinese Taipei)
5	Pivot	Chiang Chun-Yi	(Chinese Taipei)
6	Defender	Chen Wei-Chia	(Chinese Taipei)
7	Winger	Lai Ku-Feng	(Chinese Taipei)
8	Winger	Huang Po-Chun	(Chinese Taipei)
9	Winger	Hong Wei-Teng	(Chinese Taipei)
10	Winger	Hsiao Hung-Hsuan	(Chinese Taipei)
11	Defender	Lai Ming-Hui	(Chinese Taipei)
12	Goalkeeper	Fu Li-Wei	(Chinese Taipei)
13	Winger	Hsu Tzu-Yueh	(Chinese Taipei)
14	Winger	Weng Yu-Han	(Chinese Taipei)
15	Defender	Chen Wei-Chen	(Chinese Taipei)
16	Winger	Huang Kuang-Le	(Chinese Taipei)
17	Winger	Wu Cheng-Hsuan	(Chinese Taipei)
18	Goalkeeper	Wang Yen-Chieh	(Chinese Taipei)
19	Goalkeeper	Chiang Cheng-En	(Chinese Taipei)
20	Goalkeeper	Pan Chun-Yuan	(Chinese Taipei)
21	Winger	Hsu Chen-Wei	(Chinese Taipei)
22	Pivot	He Mao-Ping	(Chinese Taipei)
23	Defender	Chen Yu-Pin	(Chinese Taipei)
24	Defender	Chen Lu-Yi	(Chinese Taipei)
25	Winger	Lai Po-Chun	(Chinese Taipei)
