= Baseball in Taiwan =

Baseball in Taiwan is a major sport that is often characterized as the national sport (Chinese: 國球). It was introduced during the Japanese rule era around 1897 and gained popularity over time, culminating in some successes of Taiwanese teams in the Japanese system. The sport remained popular following the retreat of the Republic of China to Taiwan despite the Kuomintang (KMT) government's deliberate policy of removing cultural links to Japan.

In the shifting international environment that eventually led to the ROC's departure from the United Nations, the KMT government used baseball as a tool for nation-building, pouring massive resources into the sport in the hopes of forging a stronger national identity.

The highest level of baseball in Taiwan is the Chinese Professional Baseball League (CPBL) founded in 1989.

== History ==
=== Introduction and early years ===
Baseball was introduced to Taiwan around 1897, but it initially remained a game for Japanese bureaucrats and bankers in the colonial seat of Taihoku (modern-day Taipei). The first official baseball team in Taiwan was formed in 1904, when the island was a Japanese colony, by the Middle School of the Taiwan Governor-General's National Language School (present-day Chien Kuo Senior High School). The first organized baseball game was played between this team and the team of the Normal School of the Taiwan Governor-General's National Language School (present-day Taipei Municipal University of Education) in March 1906.

From 1906 through the mid-1920s, Taiwanese baseball teams consisted mainly of Japanese players. Taiwanese did not become actively involved in the sport until the mid-1920s. Around 1921, the first team made up of indigenous Taiwanese peoples was established in eastern Taiwan, and it was reorganized into the Noko (Chinese: 能高; also known as Nenggao) team. As part of the reorganization, Japanese officials offered players on the team the opportunity to attend the Hualien Agricultural School.

That the Noko team consisted completely of indigenous Taiwanese, rather than Japanese or Han Taiwanese players, was a milestone in racial integration, albeit often noted through a colonial lens. Nonetheless, the success and popularity of the team laid the foundation for the further development of baseball in southern Taiwan, notably Takao First Public School in present-day Qijin, Kaohsiung, and Mawuku Public School in present-day Taitung County.

=== Colonial participation ===
By 1931, high school baseball had become very popular in Taiwan, even though of all players dating back to 1923 in the Islandwide High School Baseball Tournaments, only 5.2% were ethnic Taiwanese. The baseball team of Kagi Agriculture and Forestry Institute, hailing from Chiayi, played its way into the final of that year’s Summer Koshien tournament, becoming the only Taiwanese team to every do so, although they lost in to Chūkyō Commercial. The team arrived as one of 22 district representatives out of a total of 631 team across the empire. Historians have noted the significance of the "tri-ethnic" Kano squad, consisting of Japanese, Han Taiwanese, and indigenous Taiwanese students.

=== Republic of China era ===
The sport remained a steadfast passion in the face of political turmoil after World War II and Chiang Kai Shek's regime. In 1968, the Taitung Red Leaves defeated a Japanese team which sparkled stories about poor indigenous boys defeating baseball giants. Following the Republic of China's expulsion from the United Nations in 1971 and losing the United States' recognition in 1979, Chiang Kai Shek viewed baseball as a means for national cohesion and soft power. Chiang had attempted to eradicate all ties with the Japanese colonial era but realized the sport's role in morale. The national team was, however, barred from competing under the name of "China" as well as utilizing the ROC flag and competed as "Chinese Taipei". Chiang was particularly driven to invest resources in youth baseball. On seventeen ocassions between 1969 and 1995, Taiwan claimed the Little League World Series.

== Professional baseball ==
Professional baseball in Taiwan started with the founding of the Chinese Professional Baseball League (CPBL) in 1989. At its 1997 peak, Taiwan had two leagues and 11 professional teams. The competing Taiwan Major League ran from 1997 until its absorption by the CPBL in 2003.

The professional game has had several game-fixing scandals which had led to sharp declines in game attendance. However, as of 2016 baseball in Taiwan had begun to see a renewed interest in the sport in spite of this setback due to major cheating scandals.

=== Chinese Professional Baseball League ===
The Chinese Professional Baseball League was founded in 1989 with four teams and grew to seven. As of 2025, there are six teams in the league, with the most recent champion being the Rakuten Monkeys.

=== Taiwan Major League ===
The Taiwan Major League was founded in 1997 by the chairman of TVBS, a popular cable TV channel company, after it lost the nine-year (1997 to 2006) broadcasting rights for CPBL games to Videoland Television Network. TVBS had held the broadcasting rights from 1993 to 1996.

The TML was meant to compete with the CPBL, but after 6 years of financial losses, it merged with the CPBL in 2003.

== International play ==
Teams from Taiwan dominated Little League World Series in the 1970s and 1980s.

Taiwan's dominance in international baseball was demonstrated when the men's team won top three medals across all levels of baseball in 2022, including the U-12, U-15, U-18, U-23, and Baseball5 competitions, the only team to do so in baseball history. Taiwan's men's baseball team and women's baseball team are world No.2 in the WBSC Rankings as of December 2021. In 2024, the men's team won the 2024 WBSC Premier12

== Exporting talent ==
Taiwan has produced great baseball talent, but its best players usually leave for the higher salaries offered by professional teams in Japan, the United States or Canada. In the 1980s, Taiwanese pitchers Tai-Yuan Kuo and Katsuo Soh (莊勝雄) posted impressive numbers at the Seibu Lions and Chiba Lotte Marines, in Japan's Nippon Professional Baseball. Young stars, such as outfielder Chin-Feng Chen and pitchers Chien-Ming Wang, Chin-Hui Tsao, and Hong-Chih Kuo, became the first group of Taiwanese players to play for teams in North American Major League Baseball. Wei-Chung Wang became the first Taiwanese player to play in the KBO League when he signed with the NC Dinos in 2018.

== Customs ==
In 2000, it was decided to replace the image of former president Chiang Kai Shek's image on the NT$500 banknote with that of an indigenous football team. Despite the independence from Japan, Taiwanese fans have retained basic Japanese baseballing jargon, generally consisting of English loanwords. For instance, second and third bases are respectively called sekando (セカンド) and sādo (サード).

== Attendances ==
In the 2025 league season, six Taiwanese baseball clubs recorded an average home league attendance of at least 5,000:

Team	Attendance
CTBC Brothers	13,606
Wei Chuan Dragons	11,618
Fubon Guardians	10,653
Rakuten Monkeys	9,968
TSG Hawks	8,246
Uni-President 7-Eleven Lions	8,148

== See also ==
- Taiwan Series
- Asia Series
- Chinese Taipei national baseball team
- Professional baseball in Japan
- Baseball in China
- Baseball in South Korea
- Sport in Taiwan
