= Baseball in China =

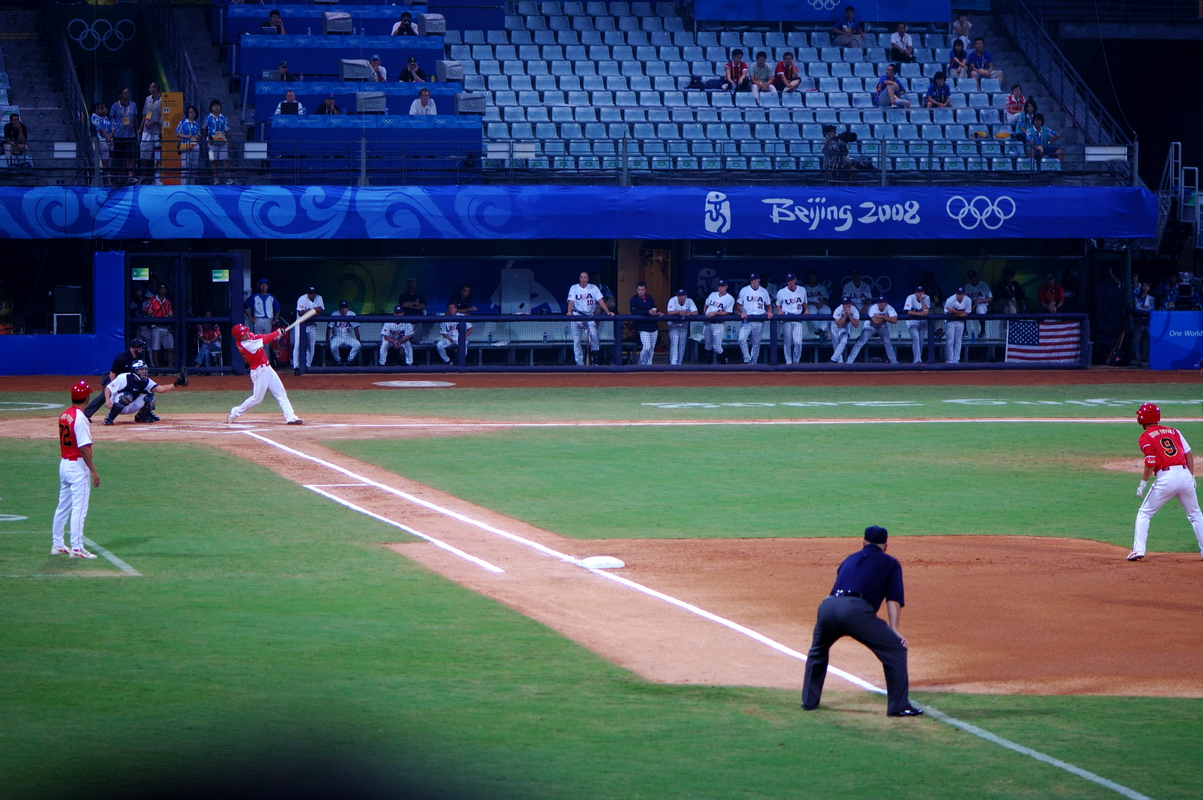
A Chinese batter swinging at the ball during the 2008 Beijing Olympics.

In 2019, MLB estimated that there were around 21 million active baseball fans in China, with most of them having started following baseball in recent years.

== History ==
=== Early history ===
Baseball was first introduced to China in 1864 with the establishment of the Shanghai Baseball Club by American medical missionary Henry William Boone. The Qing dynasty then began sending Chinese students to America to learn more about the game. Organized baseball games were established with a game between St. Johns University and the Shanghai MCA baseball club in 1905. In 1915, China placed second to the Philippines in a Greater Asia tournament, and in the 1940s, Communist forces began using baseball as a way to cultivate discipline and to become better at throwing grenades, with baseball becoming the unofficial sport of the Army.

=== Contemporary era ===
In 1959, a nationwide baseball competition began. However, in the same year, Mao Zedong disbanded all the teams and outlawed baseball and other Western-origin influences as part of the Cultural Revolution. Baseball activities only restarted after Mao's death in 1976. The China Baseball League and China National Baseball League were founded in 2002 and 2019 respectively. Both leagues were later supplanted by Chinese Professional Baseball in 2025. China participates in the World Baseball Classic. Defeats of the national team to Taiwan, Japan, and South Korea may help change the trend as Chinese become more aware of the game's internationalization.

Variations of baseball, such as slow-pitch softball and Baseball5, have helped power the growth of the sport in China. For example, Baseball5 has been promoted in Hong Kong as a way of reaching new fans, with the 2024 World Cup having been hosted in the city. Major League Baseball has put significant effort into spreading the sport in China, such as by starting the Play Ball initiative that has reached over 5 million school children since 2008.

== See also ==
- Chinese Professional Baseball
- Chinese Baseball Association
- China national baseball team
- Baseball in Taiwan
