= Chinese Enterprise Archery League =

Taiwanese archery league

- Current season, competition or edition: 2024 CEAL season
- Sport: Archery
- Founded: 2019
- First season: 2019
- No. of teams: 7
- Country: Taiwan
- Most recent champion: My Humble House Group (3rd title)
- Most titles: My Humble House Group (3 titles)
- Broadcaster: DAZN
- Website: https://ceal.tw/

The Chinese Enterprise Archery League(CEAL) is a Taiwanese archery league founded in 2019.

== History ==
The CEAL was founded by Chinese Taipei Archery Association in 2019. The six teams participating in the inaugural season are Caesar Park, CTAA Youth Team, Hsinchu City JSL Group, My Humble House Group, Taichung Bank Eagles, and Tainan Archery Team. The first edition CEAL draft was held on March 6, 2019, at Sheraton Hotel Taipei.

In 2022, Chang Hwa Bank joined as the seventh CEAL team.

== Format ==
Each game is played for five matches. The matches play in the order as women's individual, men's individual, mixed doubles, women's team, and men's team. Points are awarded to the winning team for each match. Each player can participate no more than two matches in all games.

The playoff games qualification is based on the total points of the regular season.

== Teams ==
Team	Joined
Chang Hwa Bank	2022
CTAA Youth Team	2019
Hsinchu City JSL Group	2019
My Humble House Group	2019
New Taipei Caesar Park	2019
NU-House Construction Group	2019

=== Former teams ===
- Taichung Bank Eagles (2019–2025)

=== Timeline ===
Current team Former team

== Draft ==
In the first two seasons, men and women draftees were drafted respectively. Since 2021, men and women draftees were selected in a same draft.

Season	First selections		Team	ref
Season	Men	Women	Team	ref
2019	Deng Yu-cheng	Tan Ya-ting	Hsinchu Ciy JSL Group	
2020	Chen Chen	Tan Ya-ting	Taichung Bank Eagles	
2021	Sui Yun-chin		Taichung Bank Eagles	
2022	Wu Yu-ming		Chang Hwa Bank	
2023	Su Hsin-yu		Taichung Bank Eagles	
2024	Chang Yi-chung		Taichung Bank Eagles	

== Champions ==
Season	Team
2019	My Humble House Group
2020	My Humble House Group
2021	Hsinchu City JSL Group
2022	New Taipei Caesar Park
2023	My Humble House Group

== Awards ==
Season	Best Male Archer	Best Female Archer	Best Mix Duo	Best Women's Team	Best Men's Team
2019	Wei Chun-heng (My Humble House Group)	Peng Chia-mao (Tainan)	Hung Cheng-hao, Peng Chia-mao (Tainan)		
2020	Kao Hao-wen (Taichung Bank Eagles)	Peng Chia-mao (Tainan)	Choi Geon, Tan Ya-ting (Taichung Bank Eagles)	CTAA Youth Team	CTAA Youth Team
2021	Wei Chun-heng (My Humble House Group)	Su Ssu-min (CTAA Youth Team)	Jao Ting-yu, Lei Chien-ying (New Taipei Caesar Park)	CTAA Youth Team	Hsinchu City JSL GROUP
2022	Wei Chun-heng (My Humble House Group)	Kuo Tzu-ying (Hsinchu City JSL Group)	Liu Tai-yen, Su Ssu-min (CTAA Youth Team)	Chang Hwa Bank	CTAA Youth Team
2023	Wei Chun-heng (My Humble House Group)	Chiu Yi-ching (Chang Hwa Bank)	Hung Cheng-hao, Peng Chia-mao (NU-House Construction Group)	Chang Hwa Bank	NU-House Construction Group
