= KingWhale Taipei =

Taiwanese women's volleyball team

- Founded: 2019
- League: Top Volleyball League
- 2025/26: Regular Season Champions
- Website: kingwhalesports.com

KingWhale Taipei
- Traditional Chinese: 臺北鯨華女子排球隊
- Literal meaning: Taipei Whale Glory women's volleyball team
Transcriptions
Standard Mandarin
- Hanyu Pinyin: Táiběi Jīnghuá Nǚzǐ Páiqiú Duì

KingWhale Taipei (Chinese: 臺北鯨華; pinyin: Táiběi Jīnghuá) is a Taiwanese women's volleyball team based in Taipei, Taiwan. They compete in the Top Volleyball League.

== History ==
KingWhale Taipei was established in 2019 by textile firm KingWhale (pinyin: Jīnghuá gōngyè; lit. 'Jinghua Industry') from players of the University of Taipei.

The team plays in the Top Volleyball League. They won their first title in the 2022–23 season breaking Taipower's seven championship streak.

They played as a guest team in the Premier Volleyball League of the Philippines specifically the 2022 Invitational Conference. KingWhale lost to the Creamline Cool Smashers in the finals.

KingWhale played in the 2023 Asian Women's Club Volleyball Championship.

== Honours ==
- Top Volleyball League
  (x1) 2022–23
- Premier Volleyball League
  Invitational Conference (x1) 2022
