= Women's football in Taiwan =

Overview of Taiwan in football

Women's Football in Taiwan
- Governing body: Chinese Taipei Football Association
- National team: Women's national team

National competitions
- FIFA Women's World Cup; Asian Games; EAFF E-1 Football Championship

Club competitions
- League: Taiwan Mulan Football League

Women's football in Taiwan, while still developing, has been making strides in recent years. With increased support from the Chinese Taipei Football Association and growing interest from young athletes, the sport is gradually gaining visibility in the country. Taiwanese women's football has achieved several milestones on the international stage, fostering both competitive national teams and a structured domestic league system.

== Club football ==
The primary league for women's football in Taiwan is the Taiwan Mulan Football League, founded in 2014. It is currently the highest tier for female football players in the country and comprises teams from various regions, including prominent clubs like Hualien FC and Taichung Blue Whale. The league aims to develop female players' skills and increase public interest in women's footballam The Taiwan Women's National Football Team has represented the country in numerous international competitions, including the FIFA Women's World Cup, the Asian Games, and the East Asian Football Championship. In the 1980s and 1990s, Taiwan's team was particularly competitive, achieving high ranks in Asian tournaments and demonstrating the talent pool present in Taiwanese women's football. With recent efforts to strengthen the team and recruit from younger generations, the national team aspires to re-establish itself as a strong competitor on the Asian football scene.
