= Taiwan Futsal League =

Taiwanese sports league

- Founded: 2021; 5 years ago
- Folded: 2024; 2 years ago
- Country: Taiwan
- Confederation: AFC
- Most championships: Chiayi TienChing (3 titles)
- Broadcaster(s): VL Sports
- Website: https://www.ctfa.com.tw/tfl.html

The Taiwan Futsal League was a Taiwanese men's futsal league founded in 2021 by Chinese Taipei Football Association.

== History ==
In the 2021 season, Chiayi TienChing won the league with a perfect season of ten wins. The team also clinched all the awards, Best Coach, Golden Boot, Golden Glove and Fair Play award. In 2024, the league was replaced by the new-formed Formosa Futsal One.

== Clubs ==
=== Timeline ===
Current team Former team

== Winners ==
Season	Champion	Runner-up
2021	Chiayi TienChing	Traveler
2022	Chiayi TienChing	Taichung Traveler
2023	Chiayi TienChing	YTFC

== Awards ==
=== MVP of the year ===
season	winner	team
2022	Liu Ju-Ming	Taichung Traveler
2023	Wang Kun-Wei	Chiayi TienChing

=== Best Coach ===
season	winner	team
2021	Lin Po-Chih	Chiayi TienChing
2022	Lin Po-Chih	Chiayi TienChing
2023	Chu Chia-Wei	Chiayi TienChing

=== Golden boot ===
season	winner	team
2021	Tai Wei-Jen	Chiayi TienChing
2022	Lin Chih-Hung	Chiayi TienChing
2023	Tai Yi-Yun	YTFC

=== Golden glove ===
season	winner	team
2021	Chuang Hsien-Kai	CTFA U20
2022	Chen Wei-Chun	Chiayi TienChing
2023	Chiang Hsin-Wei	Chiayi TienChing

=== Fair play award ===
season	team
2021	Chiayi TienChing
2022	Taichung Traveler
2023	Chiayi TienChing
