= Taichung Apollo =

Taiwanese men's volleyball club

- Full name: Taichung Apollo
- Founded: 2007
- Dissolved: 2023
- Head coach: Jhuang Shih-Sian
- Captain: Huang Wei-Cheng
- League: Top Volleyball League
- 2022/23: 3rd
- Website: Club home page

Taichung Apollo is a Taiwanese volleyball team based in Taichung, Taiwan. They compete in the Top Volleyball League.

== History ==
The team is composed of the Feng Yuan Commercial High School volleyball team alumni.

The team took part in their inaugural Top Volleyball League season in 2007 as Chunlee Consulting under the sponsorship of Chunlee Consulting. The team did not participate in 2008 season and resumed in 2009–10 season, with the name Yi Hua under the sponsorship of Yi Hua Construction and Easy Harvest in 2011, 2012 seasons under the sponsorship of East Harvest Sporting Equipment. In 2014, the team was sponsored by Brilliant Footwear Corporation and renamed Taichung Lien Chuang, named after the chairman Lien Hua-Jung's son, Lien Chuang. The Lien Chuang signed Serbian outside hitter Milan Perić and Pakistani opposite Aimal Khan, becoming the first two teams to sign import players in Top Volleyball League history. Despite the Lien Chuang finished as runner-up in the season, the team had faced operational issues and the sponsorship was taken over by C-LiFe Technologies. The team was renamed Taichung Longpower for the following seasons. In 2021, the team was renamed Taichung Apollo.

== Team ==
Squad as of August 2023

Team roster – season 2022/2023
No.	Name	Date of birth	Position
1	(Taiwan) Huang Wei-Cheng (c)	2 March 1992 (age 33)	setter
5	(Taiwan) Chen En-Te	24 March 2004 (age 20)	opposite
7	(Taiwan) Chen Chao-Min	20 January 1996 (age 29)	outside hitter
9	(Taiwan) Kao Wei-Cheng	29 October 1995 (age 29)	outside hitter
10	(Taiwan) Chien Wei-Lun	6 February 1989 (age 36)	libero
12	(Taiwan) Kao Te-Yi	7 November 1994 (age 30)	setter
13	(Taiwan) Huang Po-Jui	30 June 2001 (age 23)	libero
14	(Taiwan) Lin Yu-Cheng	7 November 1999 (age 25)	middle blocker
16	(Taiwan) Li Xiu-Yu	27 February 2002 (age 23)	outside hitter
17	(Taiwan) Ko Tsung-Fu	9 July 2000 (age 24)	middle blocker
18	(Taiwan) Lin Wei-Hsiang	11 November 2003 (age 21)	middle blocker
19	(Taiwan) Huang Shih-Chan	29 April 1999 (age 25)	outside hitter
20	(Taiwan) Chiao Hsuan-Cheng	9 June 1999 (age 25)	outside hitter

== Honours ==
- Top Volleyball League
  (x4) 2015, 2018–19, 2020–21, 2021–22
  (x7) 2009–10, 2011, 2012, 2016, 2017–18, 2019–20, 2022–23
