= History of television in Taiwan =

History of television in Taiwan. The television industry in Taiwan developed later compared to Europe and the United States.

== Timeline ==
=== Black and white TV ===
On March 4, 1961, the Taiwan provincial government set up the Taiwan Television career preparatory committee". On April 28, 1962, Taiwan Television was formally established.

=== Color TV ===
In 1967, President Chiang Kai-shek directed the integration of the above 12-second television applications, by the Broadcasting Corporation of China (BCC) combined with 28 private radio stations and some interested in the cause of television business and cultural circles raised funds to set up the second TV station, named "China Television Company".

=== Digital TV ===
Early forays to digital television started on Taiwan on July 1, 2004. The main channels started to use SDTV format with analog signal which had been carried out for decades. Taiwan's first HDTV channel HiHD (which belonged to PTS) started on February 1, 2008 with test transmissions throughout the country, mainly in the northern region. Official broadcast began on May 15, 2008 and it spread its signals to Taipei and Kaohsiung. Its official launch would occur on July 24, 2012.

National Communications Commission terminated analog terrestrial television on June 30, 2012. By that time the main networks CTV, TTV, CTS, FTV and PTS fully transitioned to digital and with that ended 50 years of the analog signal in the country in the free-to-air frequency. On December 29, 2014 TTV upgraded its HD signal. Cable television would transition to digital by 2017.

== Program classification system ==
The second generation (current) of the TV program classification mark (June 13, 2017). from left to right order: general level, protection level, auxiliary 12, auxiliary 15, limit level.

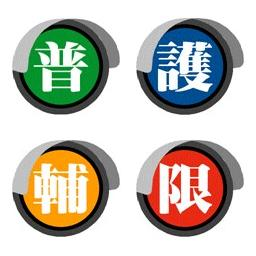
The first generation of TV program grading signs. Top left: General level – Top right: Protection level – Lower left: Counseling level – Lower right: limited – {system} – level
