= Top Volleyball League =

Pre-eminent volleyball leagues in Taiwan

- Current season, competition or edition: 2025–26 Top Volleyball League
- Sport: Volleyball
- Founded: 2004
- No. of teams: M: 6 W: 5
- Country: Taiwan
- Continent: AVC (Asia)
- Most recent champions: M: Win Streak (3rd title); W: KingWhale Taipei (2nd title)
- Most titles: M: Pingtung Taipower (13 titles); W: Kaohsiung Taipower (10 title)
- Broadcaster: DAZN
- Streaming partners: HOP Sports (YouTube); CHT MOD (IPTV)
- Website: http://tvl.ctvba.org.tw/

The Top Volleyball League (Chinese: 企業排球聯賽), literally 'Enterprise Volleyball League', often abbreviated to the TVL, is the top-tier amateur men's and women's volleyball leagues run by Chinese Taipei Volleyball Association (CTVA). It was founded in 2004 with the purpose of increasing Taiwan's competition ability in volleyball. CTVA plans to make the league become semi-professional or professional in the future.

== Clubs ==
=== Men's clubs ===
- Hsinchu Collie Engineers
- Pingtung Taipower
- Sunford Tigers
- Taipei NTUE Phoenix
- Taoyuan Longmy
- Yunlin Mizuno

=== Women's clubs ===
- Earth Power
- Kaohsiung Taipower
- KingWhale Taipei
- New Taipei CMFC

=== Timeline ===
Men's team Women's team

== Results ==
=== Men's league ===
Season	Year	Champion	Regular season standings					
Season	Year	Champion	1st	2nd	3rd	4th	5th	6th
1	2004–05	Taipower	Taipower	NSTC	Mercuries	Jin Jin	—N/a	—N/a
2	2005	Taipower	Taipower	Mizuno	NSTC	CMFC	—N/a	—N/a
3	2006	Taichung Bank	Taichung Bank	Taipower	Hsinchu Powerchip	Mizuno NSTC	—N/a	—N/a
4	2007	Taipower	Taichung Bank	Taipower	Mizuno NSTC	Chunlee Consulting	Hsinchu Powerchip	—N/a
5	2008	Taipower	Taipower	Taichung Bank	Mizuno	NSTC	—N/a	—N/a
6	2009–10	Taipower	Taipower	Mizuno	Yi Hua	NSTC	—N/a	—N/a
7	2011	Mizuno	Taipower	Mizuno	Easy Harvest	NSTC	—N/a	—N/a
8	2012	Mizuno	Taipower	Mizuno	Easy Harvest	NSTC	—N/a	—N/a
9	2013	NSTC	NSTC	Taipower	Mizuno	Conti	—N/a	—N/a
10	2014	Taipower	Taipower	Mizuno	NSTC	Chung Kun Falcons	Conti	—N/a
11	2015	Taipower	Taipower	Taichung Lien Chuang	NSTC	Mizuno	Chung Kun Falcons	Conti
12	2016	Taipower	Taipower	Mizuno	Taichung Longpower	Chung Kun Falcons	NSTC	Conti
13	2017–18	Taipower	Taipower	Mizuno	Taichung Longpower	NSTC	Taoyuan Shyi Yi	—N/a
14	2018–19	Taipower	Taipower	Taichung Longpower	Mizuno	Conti	—N/a	—N/a
15	2019–20	Taipower	Taipower	Yunlin Mizuno	Taichung Longpower	Taoyuan TFMI	Conti	—N/a
16	2020–21	Taipower	Taipower	Taichung Longpower	Yunlin Mizuno	Taoyuan TFMI	Conti	—N/a
17	2021–22	Pingtung Taipower	Pingtung Taipower	Taichung Apollo	Taoyuan TFMI	Conti	Yunlin Mizuno	—N/a
18	2022–23	Win Streak	Win Streak	Pingtung Taipower	Taichung Apollo	Taoyuan TFMI Falcons	Yunlin Mizuno	Conti
19	2023–24	Win Streak	Win Streak	Pingtung Taipower	Yunlin Mizuno	Taoyuan TFMI Falcons	Changhua SDTV	Taipei Conti
20	2024–25	Win Streak	Win Streak	Pingtung Taipower	Yunlin Mizuno	Taoyuan TFMI Falcon	Changhua SDTV	Taipei Conti
21	2025–26	Yunlin Mizuno	Pingtung Taipower	Yunlin Mizuno	Taipei NTUE Lions	Taoyuan TFMI Falcon	LionKing	—N/a

=== Women's league ===
Season	Year	Champion	Regular season standings				
Season	Year	Champion	1st	2nd	3rd	4th	5th
6	2009–10	Taipower	Taipower	Top Girl	Conti	—N/a	—N/a
7	2011	Top Girl	Top Girl	Taipower	Conti	—N/a	—N/a
8	2012	Taipower	Taipower	Top Girl	Conti	—N/a	—N/a
9	2013	Taipower	Taipower	CMFC	T.Grand	—N/a	—N/a
10	2014	Taipower	Taipower	CMFC	T.Grand	—N/a	—N/a
11	2015	CMFC	Taipower	CMFC	Chung Kun Falcons	T.Grand	—N/a
12	2016	Taipower	Taipower	CMFC	Chung Kun Falcons	T.Grand	—N/a
13	2017–18	Taipower	Taipower	CMFC	Attack Line	T.Grand	—N/a
14	2018–19	Taipower	Taipower	CMFC	Top Speed	Attack Line	—N/a
15	2019–20	Taipower	Taipower	CMFC	Top Speed	KingWhale Taipei	JSL
16	2020–21	Taipower	Taipower	CMFC	KingWhale Taipei	Top Speed	JSL
17	2021–22	Kaohsiung Taipower	Kaohsiung Taipower	KingWhale Taipei	Top Speed	CMFC	JSL
18	2022–23	KingWhale Taipei	KingWhale Taipei	Kaohsiung Taipower	Top Speed	CMFC	JSL
19	2023–24	Top Speed	Top Speed	Kaohsiung Taipower	KingWhale Taipei	New Taipei CMFC	Caesar Park
20	2024–25	KingWhale Taipei	Kaohsiung Taipower	KingWhale Taipei	New Taipei CMFC	Earth Power	
21	2024–25	Taipei King Whale	Taipei King Whale	New Taipei CMFC	Kaohsiung Taipower	Earth Power	—N/a
