= Taitung Red Leaves =

The Taitung Red Leaves (Chinese: 紅葉少棒隊; lit. 'Red Leaf Little League Team' (Note: As "Red Leaf" is the name of the village translated to English, they may also be referenced with the transliterated Chinese "Hongye.")), also known as the Hongye or Maple Leaf baseball team, was a little league baseball team from Hongye, Yanping Township, Taitung, Taiwan.

In August 1968, the Red Leaves swept 7–0 to beat an all-star youth team from Japan. This win is commonly cited as the starting point of baseball fever in Taiwan, resulting in the win of the Taichung Golden Dragons the following year at the 1969 Little League World Series in South Williamsport, Pennsylvania and culminating in Taiwan's continued successes at the Little League World Series.

There is a museum in Taitung dedicated to the Red Leaves.

== Overview ==
In 1963, the principal of the school found that there were high rates of truancy, attributable to the fact that students were spending time outside. These students had a particular passion for baseball. As a result, the idea was put forth to have a baseball team.

The team is most noted for its 1968 win. Demographically, the 1968 team was composed entirely of people of Taiwanese aborigine descent, and the village, in rural Taitung, was similarly composed.

The team's story is usually regarded as an underdog success story, with "colonized" Taiwan winning over the "colonizer" Japan. Adding to this was that the team's championship run almost ended when they announced they were too poor to attend a match in Taipei. They had defeated a team from Chiayi, but announced they would not be moving to the next stage. Donations allowed them to travel. After winning the championship of the league, they played the fateful friendly exhibition series against the team from Japan and won decisively.

== Myths and controversies ==
One controversy was the use of substitute, over-age players. The Little League carried out its own investigations and could find no evidence of this. Though there were regulations that were not followed, these regulations were not evenly applied for the international partners of the Little League, which meant that though Taiwan reorganized its domestic baseball rules to better meet these regulations, no real penalty was applied. No serious fallout occurred for the players and serious accusations were generally considered groundless.

In 1969, a coach and team leader were indicted by the Taitung District Court for using counterfeit documents. Though this had no bearing on prior wins and on the team itself, it did mar the reputation of the team and the reputation of Taiwanese baseball.

An enduring myth is that the team that played the Red Leaves was the championship team from Wakayama. This is not true. Though the team the Red Leaves played was in fact from Wakayama, the team they defeated were not the players that were the champions, but another team from Wakayama.

Another unverified part of the story was that the team was so impoverished they could barely afford shoes, played with sticks and peach pits, and that the catcher could not even afford to buy a mask. These stories were widely reported at the time in the United Daily News and other domestic (and sometimes, international) media, though they were likely exaggerated. These narratives, however, have become an enduring part of the story of the Red Leaves.

== Outcomes ==
The win sparked an island-wide baseball craze, and cemented baseball as a part of Taiwan's national consciousness. In fact, future winners of the Little League World Series would be treated like heroes upon their return, with grand parades in celebration. The Taichung Golden Dragons in 1969 were even asked to meet with Chiang Kai-shek.

At this time, there was no professional baseball league in Taiwan, so players generally found employ through Japanese baseball teams or through other avenues.

== Other media ==
A documentary about the Red Leaves, The Red Leaf Legend, won the 1999 Busan Film Festival, Taipei Film Festival, and Golden Horse Award for Best Documentary.
