= Baseball in Nicaragua =

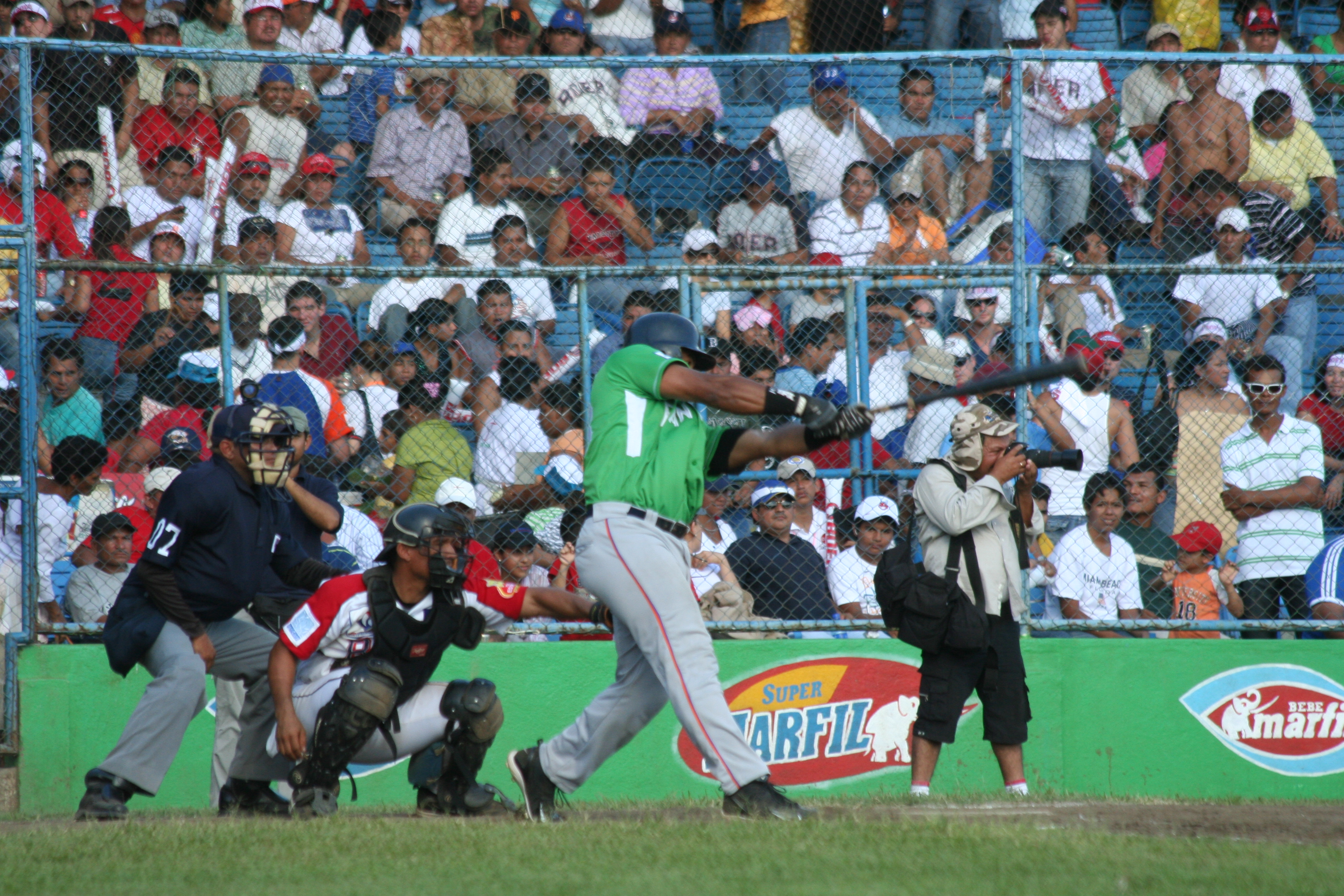
A batter of the Fieras del San Fernando, a Nicaraguan professional baseball team.

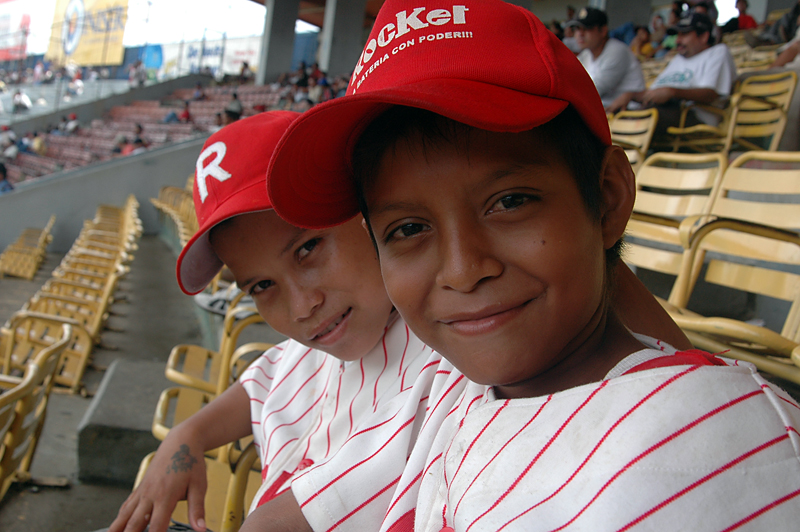
Baseball fans attending a Nicaraguan Professional Baseball League game.

Baseball is the national game of Nicaragua, it is the most popular sport in the country. Nicaragua has a professional baseball league, the Nicaraguan Professional Baseball League, consisting of five teams, playing in the winter, and a semiprofessional league, the Germán Pomares Championship, playing in spring and summer. The national baseball team has been successful in the past, mainly throughout the 1970s. Nicaragua and near-by Panama are two countries who have baseball as their national sport, rather than soccer, the national sport of many Central American countries.

== History timeline ==
=== Early history ===
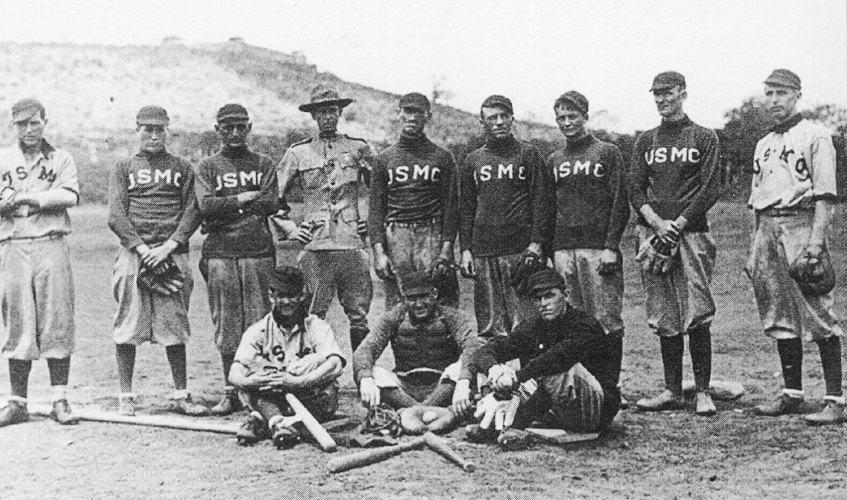
United States Marine Corps baseball team in Managua, Nicaragua, 1915.

Baseball was introduced in the 1880s by Albert Addlesberg, an American businessman living in Bluefields. During this time, the area around Bluefields was known as the autonomous Mosquito Reserve and a strong British influence in the area was evidenced by the popularity of cricket. Addlesberg convinced two of the most popular cricket clubs to switch to baseball and supplied the locals with equipment he imported from New Orleans. Two teams were created in 1887, the Southern and Four Roses. They began to play in 1888 and baseball has been played on the Mosquito Coast almost continuously since that time, but the entire region has long since been incorporated into the Republic of Nicaragua. The first 'official' game took place in 1891 between Managua and Granada. Carter Donaldson, who was the U.S. Consul in Nicaragua at the time, founded the first continuous team in 1904. United States Marines stationed in Nicaragua in the early part of the 20th century were also credited for bringing the sport to the country, and popularizing it in the area.

=== 1960s and 1970s ===
Nicaragua experimented with professional baseball in the 1950s, when the Nicaraguan Professional Baseball League was first formed. This era was characterized by the fierce rivalry between Cinco Estrellas, considered the club sponsored by the Somoza regime, and Indios del Bóer, which was adopted by opponents of the Somozas.

Professional baseball came to an end in Nicaragua in 1967, after years of political and economic problems. In the 1970s, however, baseball again became popular after the success of the Nicaragua national baseball team.

"After all, to say Nicaraguans are baseball-crazy seems ludicrously inadequate. The game is part of the air people breathe; the crack of the bat permeates hot, tropical nights; it moves up from the barrios; the game even peppers the language with borrowed English expressions, like 'play ball,' and 'home run,' used in a colloquial sense."

— Toronto Star: September 29, 1996

=== 1980s and 1990s ===
In the 1980s, popularity of baseball in the country began to decline. After the Nicaraguan civil war, baseball began to flourish again. The policy of Nicaraguan professional baseball before the 1990s was to discourage the recruitment of Nicaraguan players by Major League Baseball scouts. On August 6, 1990, the San Francisco Giants signed two players from Nicaragua, and considered building a baseball academy in a move that was seen as a step to normalizing the relationship between Nicaragua and Major League Baseball. During the 1996 Nicaraguan presidential election, candidates Arnoldo Alemán and Daniel Ortega promised increased funding for the Nicaraguan national baseball team.

=== Present day ===
In the spring of 2004, professional baseball returned to Nicaragua for the first time since 1967. In a typical modern-day game, teams have sets of cheerleaders, as well as team mascots, and marching bands who play throughout the game. Dennis Martínez National Stadium, located in Managua, Nicaragua, is used by the Indios del Bóer of the Nicaraguan Professional Baseball League. The stadium has been described being in poor shape by many, including Nicaraguan native, and former Major League Baseball pitcher Dennis Martínez, whom the stadium is named after. The 2009 World Baseball Classic was criticized by NBC Sports writer Joe Connor, after the tournament invited national baseball teams from China, Australia, and Italy, over teams from Nicaragua, and Colombia, where the sport is considerably more popular. In 2009 it was announced that a privately funded baseball academy would be built by the International Baseball Association in Villa El Carmen.

== Nicaraguans in Major League Baseball ==
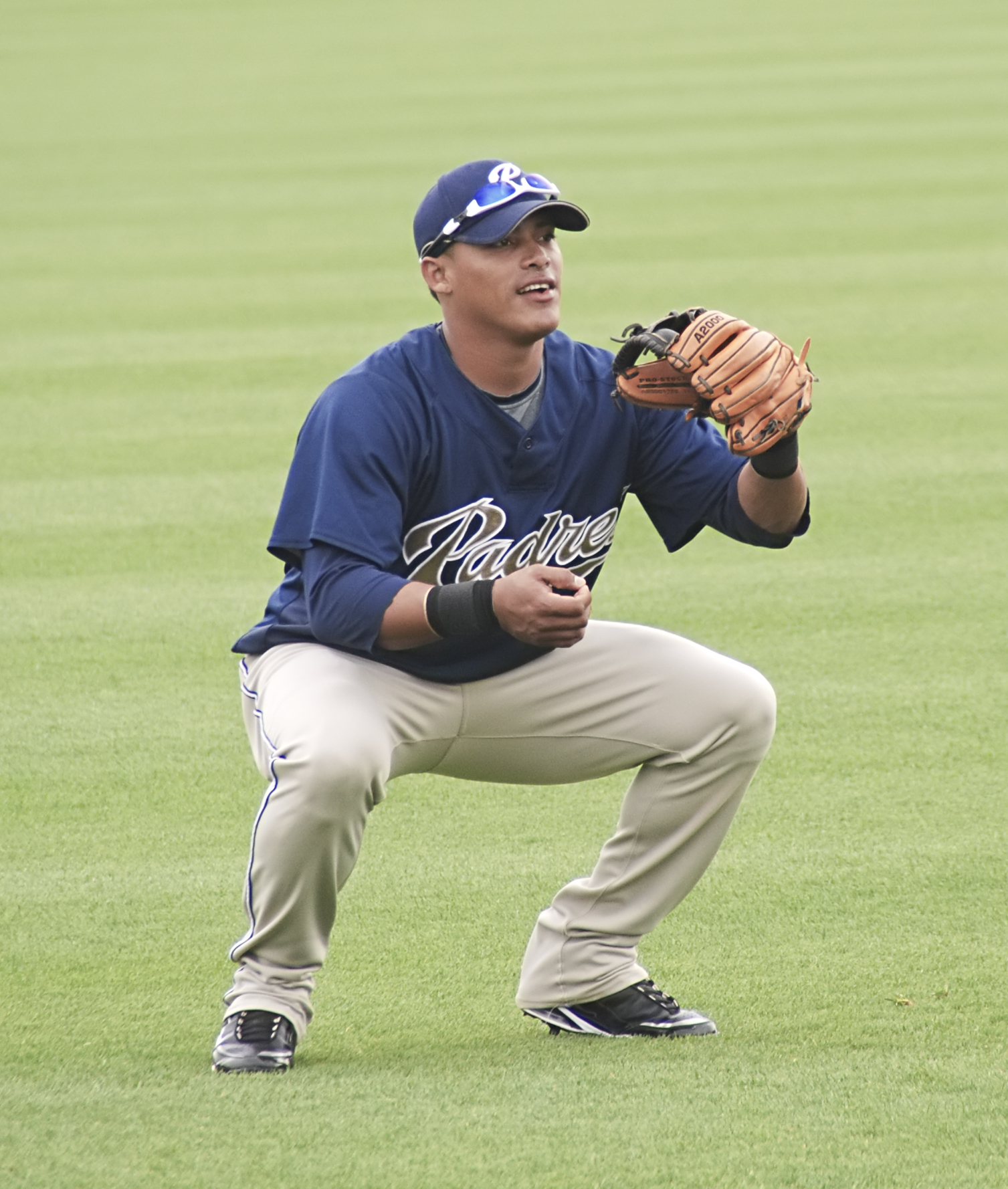
Everth Cabrera was a Nicaraguan born Major League Baseball player.

== Professional baseball in Nicaragua ==
The Nicaraguan Professional Baseball League (La Liga Nicaragüense de Beisbol Profesional in Spanish) is the professional baseball league in Nicaragua. There are five teams that compete against each other, the Indios del Bóer, the Tigres de Chinandega, the Leones de León, the Gigantes de Rivas, and Tren del Norte. There is one defunct team, the Fieras del San Fernando.

== Gallery ==
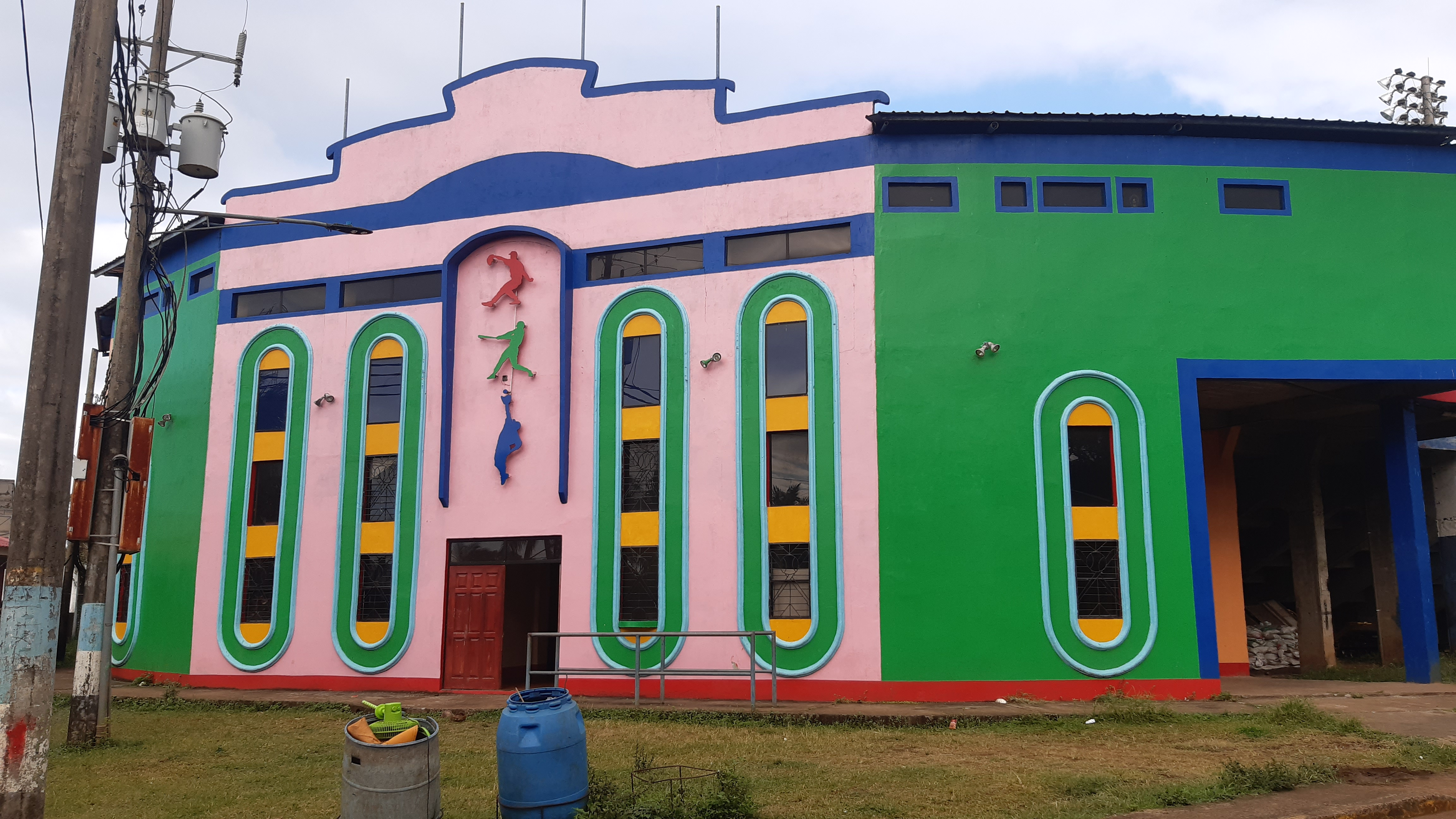
Karen Tucker Baseball Stadium, Big Corn Island

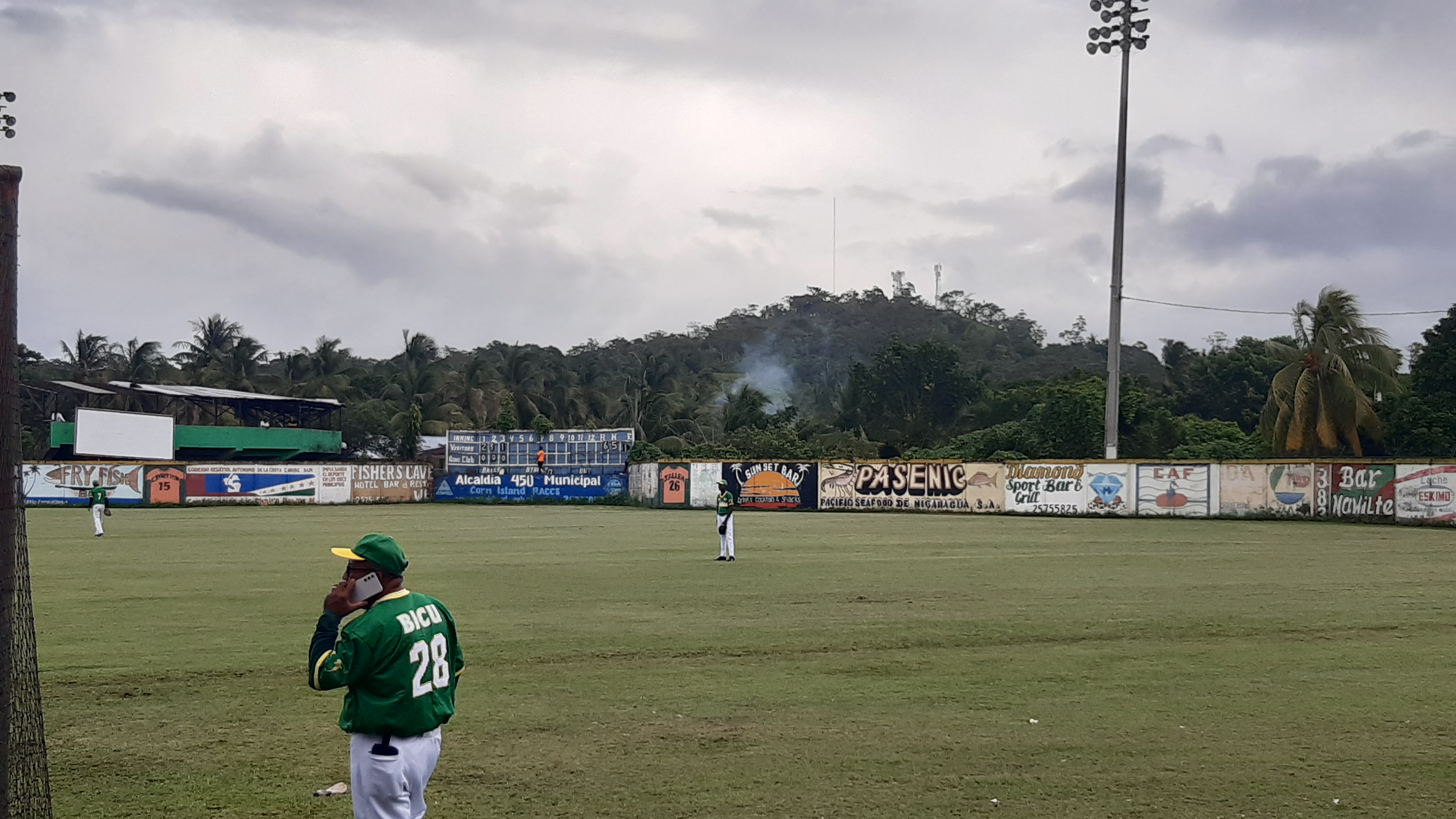
A game on Big Corn Island

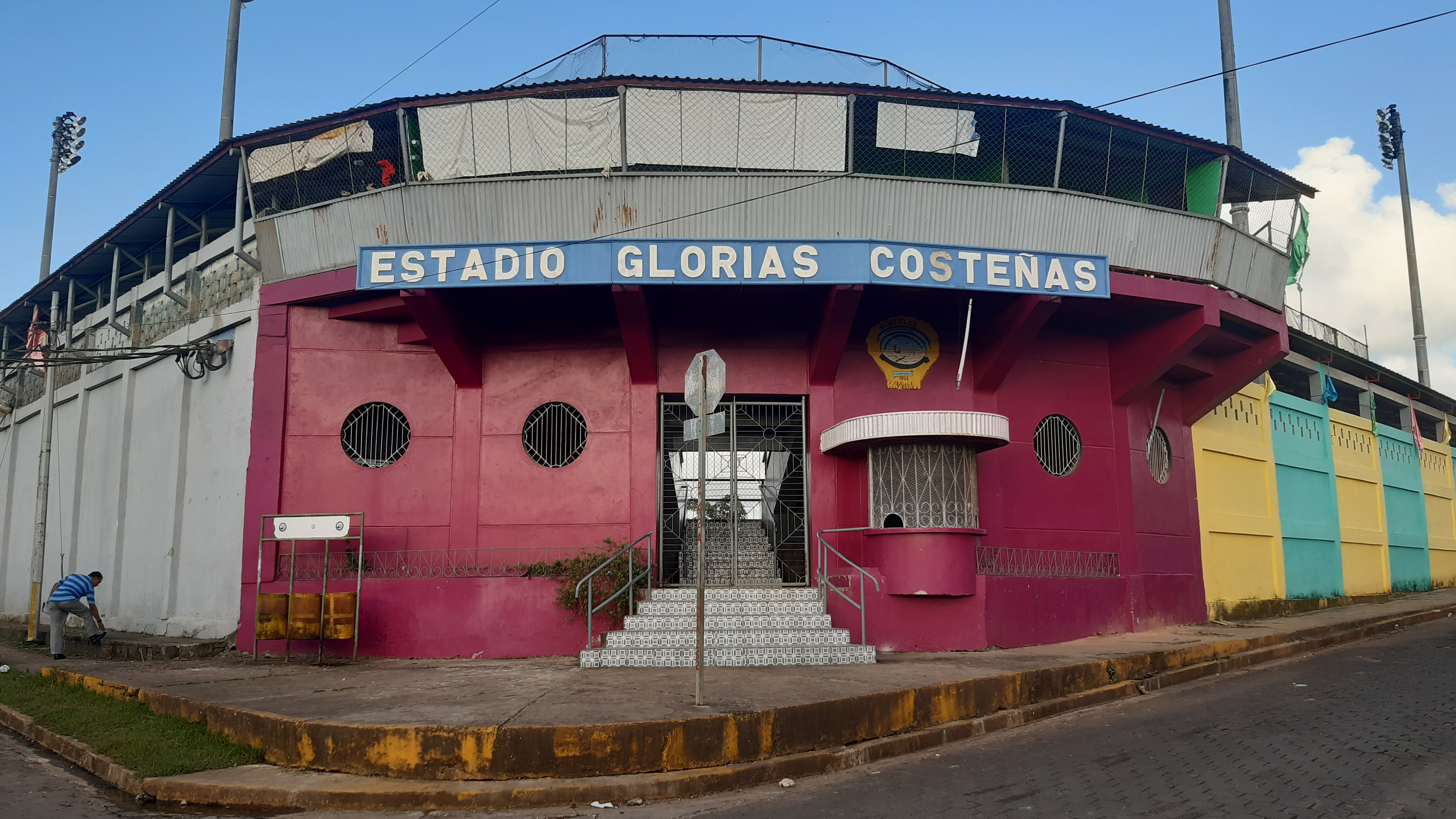
Glorias Costeñas Stadium (Estadio Glorias Costeñas), Bluefields

== See also ==
- Baseball awards § Nicaragua
- Baseball awards § Americas
