= Dantos de Managua =

Nicaraguan baseball team

- Logo

Information
- League: Germán Pomares Championship (1981–1993; 2013–present); Nicaraguan Professional Baseball League (2026–present)
- Location: Managua, Nicaragua
- Ballpark: Estadio Nacional Soberanía
- Established: 1981 (original incarnation); 2013 (modern franchise)
- Pomares titles: 9 (1985, 1987, 1988, 1991, 2016, 2018, 2021, 2023, 2025)
- Former name: Dantos del E.P.S. (1981–1986)
- Colors: Red, dark blue, white

The Dantos de Managua (English: Managua Tapirs) are a Nicaraguan baseball club. Since their foundation in 1981, they have played in the Germán Pomares Championship, the country's semi-pro summer league. The team joined the Nicaraguan Professional Baseball League for the first time in the 2026–27 winter league season.

Dantos were named in honor of Germán Pomares, a Sandinista fighter during the Nicaraguan Revolution killed in 1979. It is among the most successful in the Pomares league, winning nine championships; four of them were won between 1985 and 1991, a stretch that earned Dantos the nickname La Maquinaria Roja ("The Red Machine"). The team is also sponsored by, and closely associated with, the Nicaraguan Armed Forces.

== History ==
The Dantos team has its historical roots in Cinco Estrellas, a professional baseball club based in Managua that was sponsored by the Nicaraguan National Guard and its leader, dictator Anastasio Somoza. The team had a rivalry with Indios del Bóer, which was colored by the political situation in the country; opponents of Somoza generally rooted against Cinco Estrellas. After the Somoza family fled the country in 1979 and the FSLN took power, Cinco Estrellas did not return to First Division of amateur baseball. But two years later, Dantos, like Cinco Estrellas, would be founded as a team sponsored by and closely associated with the armed forces; the team was originally known as Dantos del E.P.S., for the Ejército Popular Sandinista.

Dantos were founded by Humberto Ortega, brother of Sandinista leader Daniel Ortega and chief of the Sandinista Army. The team was named after FSLN fighter Germán Pomares Ordóñez, who was nicknamed "El Danto" ("The Tapir") for his ability to forge trails through the dense mountain terrain; Pomares, a baseball fan and uncle of future big-leaguer Vicente Padilla, was killed in 1979, two months before the Sandinistas toppled the Somoza dictatorship.

The team enjoyed success in the late 1980s and won four championships, defeating Granada in 1985, Bóer in 1987, Costa in 1988, and Chinandega in 1991. Its first manager was Octavio Abea, a former Mexican Leaguer, though later managers included César Jarquín and Omar Cisneros. The team was dissolved after the 1993 season, after the Sandinistas lost power in the 1990 Nicaraguan general election.

Dantos returned in 2013, after Daniel Ortega returned to power as president of Nicaragua. Since then, the team has won five Pomares titles, in 2016, 2018, 2021, 2023, and 2025. It also earned the right to represent Nicaragua at the 2026 Baseball Champions League Americas in Mexico City.

The team has been criticized for its close association with the regime of Daniel Ortega and Rosario Murillo. La Prensa describe the Nicaraguan government support of Los Dantos, and of baseball in Nicaragua as a whole, as a form of bread and circuses.

== Pomares seasons ==
Dantos de Managua GPO season-by-season record
Season	Finish	Won	Lost	Win %	Postseason	Manager	Ref
1981	4th	36	42	.462	Missed playoffs	Octavio Abea	
1982	2nd	31	25	.554	Lost in Finals (Frente Sur Rivas) 3–4	Pastor Canales	
1983	4th	59	31	.656	Missed playoffs	César Jarquín	
1984	6th	29	25	.537	Missed playoffs	César Jarquín	
1985	1st	43	29	.606	Won in Finals (Granada) 4–3	César Jarquín	
1986	5th	37	35	.513	Missed playoffs	César Jarquín / Omar Cisneros	
1987	1st	44	28	.611	Won in Finals (Bóer) 4–2	Omar Cisneros	
1988	1st	44	27	.620	Won in Finals (Costa Caribe) 4–3	Julio Mairena / Omar Cisneros	
1989	4th	41	31	.569	Missed playoffs	Omar Cisneros	
1990	2nd	62	38	.620	Lost in Finals (León) 3–4	Omar Cisneros	
1991	1st	52	49	.515	Won in Finals (Chinandega) 4–3	Omar Cisneros	
1992	5th	45	44	.506	Missed playoffs	Omar Cisneros / Marvin Solís / Sergio García	
1993	5th	52	52	.500	Missed playoffs	Davis Hodgson	
2013	5th	55	40	.579	Missed playoffs	Omar Cisneros	
2014	7th	53	43	.552	Missed playoffs	Noel Areas	
2015	3rd	50	18	.735	Lost in Semifinals (León) 2–3	Noel Areas / Cairo Murillo	
2016	1st	66	40	.623	Won in Finals (Bóer) 4–2	Cairo Murillo / Cruz Ulloa	
2017	7th	61	27	.693	Missed playoffs	Cruz Ulloa	
2018	1st	33	12	.733	Won in Finals (Bóer) 4–1	Boricua Jiménez	
2019	3rd	47	17	.734	Lost in Semifinals (Bóer)	Boricua Jiménez	
2020	2nd	32	13	.711	Lost in Finals (Bóer) 2–4	Stanley Loáisiga	
2021	1st	67	45	.598	Won in Finals (Matagalpa) 4–3	Lenín Picota	
2022	2nd	82	38	.754	Lost in Finals (Bóer) 1–4	Omar Cisneros	
2023	1st	69	27	.719	Won in Finals (Estelí) 4–0	Omar Cisneros	
2024	2nd	56	29	.659	Lost in Finals (Chinandega) 1–4	Omar Cisneros	
2025	1st	75	21	.781	Won in Finals (Chontales) 4–1	Ronald Garth	
Total		1309	821	.613			

== International competition ==
=== Baseball Champions League Americas ===
Year	Venue	Finish	Wins	Losses	Win%	Manager
2026	Mexico City	3rd	2	2	.500	(Nicaragua) Ronald Garth
Total						

== Roster ==
Dantos de Managua roster
Active roster		Coaches
Pitchers: 42 (Nicaragua) Danilo Bermúdez; 42 (Nicaragua) Carlos Berrios; 54 (Nicaragua) Jorge Bucardo; 72 (Nicaragua) Leonardo Crawford; 41 (Nicaragua) Osman Gutierrez; 27 (Nicaragua) Elias Gutierrez; 32 (Nicaragua) Dilmer Mejia; 13 (Nicaragua) Angel Obando; 46 (Nicaragua) Stanling Orozco; 97 (Nicaragua) Milton Quintana; 30 (Nicaragua) Kevin Ramirez; 37 (Nicaragua) Carlos Teller; 14 (Nicaragua) Rodney Theophile; 78 (Nicaragua) Bryan Torres	Catchers: 22 (Nicaragua) Rodolfo Bone; 28 (Nicaragua) Leonardo Ortiz; Infielders: 7 (Nicaragua) Benjamin Alegria; 11 (Nicaragua) Ofilio Castro; 16 (Nicaragua) Aldo Espinoza; 5 (Nicaragua) Brandon Leytón; 88 (Nicaragua) Bryan Ruiz; Outfielders: 99 (Nicaragua) Omar Mendoza; 34 (Nicaragua) Jose Rayo; 51 (Nicaragua) Bismarck Rivera; Designated hitters: 2 (Nicaragua) Emanuel Trujillo DH/IF; 35 (Nicaragua) Juan Urbina DH/OF; Utility players: 2 (Nicaragua) Derek Loaisiga IF/OF; 35 (Nicaragua) William Rayo IF/OF	Manager: 10 (Nicaragua) Ronald Garth; Coaches: 12 (Nicaragua) Norman Cardoze (bench); 80 (Nicaragua) Duglas Dumas (3rd base); 39 (Nicaragua) Gustavo Martinez (pitching); 23 (Nicaragua) Yader Roa (1st base); 61 (Nicaragua) Franklin Sanchez (pitching)
