= 2026 Baseball Champions League Americas =

International baseball club tournament

Tournament details
- Country: Mexico
- City: Mexico City
- Venue: Estadio Alfredo Harp Helú
- Dates: 24–29 March
- Teams: 5

Final positions
- Champions: (United States) Kane County Cougars (1st title)
- Runners-up: (Mexico) Diablos Rojos del México
- Third place: (Nicaragua) Dantos de Managua
- Fourth place: (Cuba) Cocodrilos de Matanzas

Tournament statistics
- Games played: 11
- Attendance: 19,134 (1,739 per game)
- Best BA: (Nicaragua) Brandon Leytón (.700)
- Most HRs: (Mexico) Bryan Gonzalez (3)
- Most SBs: 10 tied (1)
- Best ERA: 17 tied (0.00)

Awards
- MVP: (United States) Josh Allen

The 2026 Baseball Champions League Americas was the third edition of the Baseball Champions League Americas, an international competition for baseball clubs organized by the WBSC Americas, part of the World Baseball Softball Confederation (WBSC). For a second year in a row, the tournament was be held at Estadio Alfredo Harp Helú in Mexico City, Mexico, from 24 to 29 March 2026 and feature a field of five teams, playing in a single round-robin format; the top two finishers subsequently squared off in the championship. An undetermined sixth team from Venezuela's summer league was initially announced to be participating but was quietly dropped before the tournament. For the first time, the tournament included a non-champion invitee team and a team from outside North and Central America, with the invitation of the CTBC Brothers from Taiwan's Chinese Professional Baseball League; however, due to a scheduling conflict, the team's manager confirmed they would be sending their farm team rather than their main squad.

== Venue ==
Mexico City	2026 Baseball Champions League Americas is located in Mexico
Estadio Alfredo Harp Helú	2026 Baseball Champions League Americas is located in Mexico
Capacity: 20,062	2026 Baseball Champions League Americas is located in Mexico

== Participating teams ==
Team	Manager	Means of qualification
(Cuba) Cocodrilos de Matanzas	(Cuba) Armando Ferrer	2025 Cuban National Series champions
(United States) Kane County Cougars	(United States) George Tsamis	2025 American Association of Professional Baseball champions
(Mexico) Diablos Rojos del México	(United States) Lorenzo Bundy	2025 Mexican League champions
(Nicaragua) Dantos de Managua	(Nicaragua) Ronald Garth	2025 Germán Pomares Championship champions
(Taiwan) CTBC Brothers (farm)	(Taiwan) Peng Cheng-min	Invitee from Chinese Professional Baseball League

=== Rosters ===
CTBC Brothers (farm)

CTBC Brothers (farm) roster
Active roster		Coaches
Pitchers: 73 (Taiwan) Chen Yuan-Wei; 56 (Taiwan) Chen Po-Chun; 84 (Taiwan) Chien Ko-Lun; 37 (Taiwan) Hsu Lei; 12 (Taiwan) Lin Huei-Sheng; 11 (Taiwan) Lin Chan-Chang; 71 (Taiwan) Lu Meng-Yang; 41 (Taiwan) Lu Yu-Ting; 43 (Venezuela) Angel Macuare; 35 (Taiwan) Teng Chao-Chun; 55 (Taiwan) Tseng Pin-Yang; 27 (Taiwan) You Jun-You	Catchers: 72 (Taiwan) Chen Chiu-Teng; 52 (Taiwan) Hu Meng-Chih; 44 (Taiwan) Jiao Zijie; 59 (Taiwan) Wu Jui-Tsung; Infielders: 4 (Taiwan) Chang Shr-lun; 69 (Taiwan) Hsu Shao-Yu; 75 (Taiwan) Lin Jui-Chun; 96 (Taiwan) Su Wei-Ta; 38 (Taiwan) Tsai Sheng-Jie; 6 (Taiwan) Yang Shiang-He; Outfielders: 91 (Taiwan) Chien Zih-Kuan; 60 (Taiwan) Huang Chun-Lin; 2 (Taiwan) Li Sheng-Yu; 85 (Taiwan) Liu Kuei-Yuan	Manager: 86 (Taiwan) Peng Cheng-min; Coaches: 53 (United States) Nick Additon (pitching); 87 (Taiwan) Hsu Hao-Ming; 4 (Taiwan) Kuo Feng-Chun; 36 (Taiwan) Shih Chih-Wei; 122 (Taiwan) Yeh Po-Wen

Cocodrilos de Matanzas

Cocodrilos de Matanzas roster
Active roster		Coaches
Pitchers: 21 (Cuba) Frank Alvarez; 18 (Cuba) Shaiel Cruz; 6 (Cuba) Armando Duenas; 90 (Cuba) Noervys Entenza; 48 (Cuba) Raymond Figueredo; 15 (Cuba) Yosney Garcia; 62 (Cuba) Brander Guevara; 39 (Cuba) Luis Hernandez; 16 (Cuba) Silvio Iturralde; 22 (Cuba) Rafael Perdomo; 67 (Cuba) Yamichel Perez; 81 (Cuba) Briam Reyes; 58 (Cuba) Yoennis Yera	Catchers: 12 (Cuba) Andi Cosme; 17 (Cuba) Andrys Perez; Infielders: 11 (Cuba) Juan Martinez; 1 (Cuba) Luis Meteo; 2 (Cuba) Anibal Medina; 10 (Cuba) Adrian Perez; 24 (Cuba) Yulieski Remon; 13 (Cuba) Luis Martinez; Outfielders: 55 (Cuba) Eduardo Blanco; 51 (Cuba) Yasiel Gonzales; 25 (Cuba) José Noroña; 88 (Cuba) Brayan Peña; 72 (Cuba) Esteban Terry; 54 (Cuba) Hanyelo Videt	Manager: 9 (Cuba) Armando Ferrer; Coaches: 34 (Cuba) Leandro Arco; 45 (Cuba) Juan Manrique (3rd base); 27 (Cuba) Jonder Martinez (pitching); 14 (Cuba) Frank Sanchez (pitching); 30 (Cuba) Ulises Walters

Dantos de Managua

Dantos de Managua roster
Active roster		Coaches
Pitchers: 42 (Nicaragua) Danilo Bermúdez; 42 (Nicaragua) Carlos Berrios; 54 (Nicaragua) Jorge Bucardo; 72 (Nicaragua) Leonardo Crawford; 41 (Nicaragua) Osman Gutierrez; 27 (Nicaragua) Elias Gutierrez; 32 (Nicaragua) Dilmer Mejia; 13 (Nicaragua) Angel Obando; 46 (Nicaragua) Stanling Orozco; 97 (Nicaragua) Milton Quintana; 30 (Nicaragua) Kevin Ramirez; 37 (Nicaragua) Carlos Teller; 14 (Nicaragua) Rodney Theophile; 78 (Nicaragua) Bryan Torres	Catchers: 22 (Nicaragua) Rodolfo Bone; 28 (Nicaragua) Leonardo Ortiz; Infielders: 7 (Nicaragua) Benjamin Alegria; 11 (Nicaragua) Ofilio Castro; 16 (Nicaragua) Aldo Espinoza; 5 (Nicaragua) Brandon Leytón; 88 (Nicaragua) Bryan Ruiz; Outfielders: 99 (Nicaragua) Omar Mendoza; 34 (Nicaragua) Jose Rayo; 51 (Nicaragua) Bismarck Rivera; Designated hitters: 2 (Nicaragua) Emanuel Trujillo DH/IF; 35 (Nicaragua) Juan Urbina DH/OF; Utility players: 2 (Nicaragua) Derek Loaisiga IF/OF; 35 (Nicaragua) William Rayo IF/OF	Manager: 10 (Nicaragua) Ronald Garth; Coaches: 12 (Nicaragua) Norman Cardoze (bench); 80 (Nicaragua) Duglas Dumas (3rd base); 39 (Nicaragua) Gustavo Martinez (pitching); 23 (Nicaragua) Yader Roa (1st base); 61 (Nicaragua) Franklin Sanchez (pitching)

Diablos Rojos del México

Diablos Rojos del México roster
Active roster		Coaches
Pitchers: 20 (Japan) Tomohiro Anraku; 43 (Dominican Republic) Luís Castillo; 13 (United States) Justin Courtney; 53 (Mexico) Victor Gonzalez; 51 (United States) Shane Greene; 60 (United States) James Kaprielian; 52 (United States) Andrew Marrero; 26 (Mexico) Damian Mendoza; 84 (Mexico) Jorge Monroy; 48 (Venezuela) Edgar Navarro; 66 (United States) Stephen Nogosek; 77 (Venezuela) Ricardo Pinto; 53 (United States) Nick Vespi; 43 (United States) Jimmy Yacabonis; 14 (Venezuela) Miguel Yajure	Catchers: 70 (Mexico) Gabriel Gutierrez; 9 (Dominican Republic) Francisco Mejía; 18 (Venezuela) Carlos Perez; Infielders: 38 (Dominican Republic) Maikel Franco; 61 (Mexico) Moisés Gutiérrez; 6 (United States) Rio Ruiz; 8 (Mexico) Carlos Sepúlveda; 24 (United States) Jon Singleton; 76 (Mexico) Felix Villalobos; Outfielders: 23 (Venezuela) Ramón Flores; 56 (Mexico) Bryan Gonzalez; 57 (Japan) Yoshinobu Hoshina; 46 (United States) José Marmolejos	Manager: 30 (United States) Lorenzo Bundy; Coaches: 99 (Mexico) Alfredo Amezaga (1st base); 63 (Mexico) Jesus Arredondo (3rd base); 39 (Mexico) Ernesto Espinoza (pitching); 49 (Mexico) Hector Hurtado; 83 (Mexico) Hector Mercedes (bench); 44 (Mexico) Carlos Sievers; 49 (Mexico) Sergio Valenzuela

Kane County Cougars

Kane County Cougars roster
Active roster		Coaches
Pitchers: 33 (United States) Konnor Ash; 18 (United States) Derrick Cherry; 26 (United States) Kyle Crigger; 36 (United States) Jake Dykhoff; 25 (United States) Jake Gozzo; 34 (United States) Charlie Hasty; 17 (United States) Brandon Komar; 12 (Cuba) Larrondo Denny; 15 (United States) Jordan Martinson; 30 (United States) Logan Nissen; 37 (United States) Brady Puckett; 47 (United States) Vinny Timpanelli; 19 (United States) Zach Veen; 16 (United States) Art Warren	Catchers: 27 (United States) Juan Fernandez; 5 (United States) Jaxx Groshans; Infielders: 7 (United States) Josh Allen; 2 (United States) Sam Dexter; 4 (Venezuela) Claudio Finol; 9 (United States) Todd Lott; 1 (United States) Elvis Peralta; 32 (United States) Josh Rehwaldt; Outfielders: 11 (United States) Jabari Henry; 13 (United States) Max Murphy; 21 (United States) Dillon Thomas; 8 (United States) Armond Upshaw; 3 (United States) Ray Zuberer	Manager: 22 (United States) George Tsamis; Coaches: 10 (United States) Chris Coste (bench); 23 (United States) David Holmberg (pitching); 39 (United States) Robbie Lopez; 24 (United States) Matt Passerelle

== Games ==
=== Round robin ===
Pos	Team	Pld	W	L	RF	RA	RD	PCT	GB	Qualification
1	(United States) Kane County Cougars	4	4	0	48	24	+24	1.000	—	Advance to Championship Game
2	(Mexico) Diablos Rojos del México (H)	4	3	1	65	37	+28	.750	1	Advance to Championship Game
3	(Nicaragua) Dantos de Managua	4	2	2	46	30	+16	.500	2	
4	(Cuba) Cocodrilos de Matanzas	4	1	3	28	69	−41	.250	3	
5	(Taiwan) CTBC Brothers (farm)	4	0	4	27	54	−27	.000	4	

Source: WBSC
(H) Hosts

Date	Local time	Road team	Score	Home team	Inn.	Venue	Game duration	Attendance	Boxscore
24 Mar 2026	10:00	Dantos de Managua (Nicaragua)	17–5	(Taiwan) CTBC Brothers (farm)	9	Estadio Alfredo Harp Helú	3:15	100	
24 Mar 2026	19:00	Kane County Cougars (United States)	14–7	(Mexico) Diablos Rojos del México	9	Estadio Alfredo Harp Helú	3:34	2206	
25 Mar 2026	10:00	CTBC Brothers (farm) (Taiwan)	8–9	(Cuba) Cocodrilos de Matanzas	9	Estadio Alfredo Harp Helú	3:44	N/A	
25 Mar 2026	19:00	Diablos Rojos del México (Mexico)	10–6	(Nicaragua) Dantos de Managua	9	Estadio Alfredo Harp Helú	3:29	1966	
26 Mar 2026	10:00	CTBC Brothers (farm) (Taiwan)	10–16	(United States) Kane County Cougars	9	Estadio Alfredo Harp Helú	3:54	N/A	
26 Mar 2026	19:00	Cocodrilos de Matanzas (Cuba)	6–16	(Nicaragua) Dantos de Managua	9	Estadio Alfredo Harp Helú	2:55	667	
27 Mar 2026	12:00	Kane County Cougars (United States)	9–0	(Cuba) Cocodrilos de Matanzas	9	Estadio Alfredo Harp Helú	2:30	N/A	
27 Mar 2026	19:00	Diablos Rojos del México (Mexico)	12–4	(Taiwan) CTBC Brothers (farm)	9	Estadio Alfredo Harp Helú	3:45	4074	
28 Mar 2026	10:00	Dantos de Managua (Nicaragua)	7–9	(United States) Kane County Cougars	9	Estadio Alfredo Harp Helú	3:25	N/A	
28 Mar 2026	16:00	Cocodrilos de Matanzas (Cuba)	13–36	(Mexico) Diablos Rojos del México	9	Estadio Alfredo Harp Helú	4:08	5878	

=== Championship Game ===
29 March 2026 14:00 (UTC–6) at Estadio Alfredo Harp Helú in Mexico City, México
Team	1	2	3	4	5	6	7	8	9	R	H	E
(Mexico) Diablos Rojos del México	0	0	0	0	1	0	1	1	0	3	10	1
(United States) Kane County Cougars	1	0	0	0	0	6	0	0	–	7	12	1
WP: (United States) Art Warren LP: (United States) Justin Courtney; Home runs: Away: 1 Home: 2 Attendance: 4243; Umpires: Keith McConkey, Edwin Cotto, Julio Molina, Carlos Leon, Janet Moreno, David de Jesus Solis; Notes: Elapsed time: 3:00; Boxscore

== See also ==
- 2026 Baseball Champions League Europe
