= Juan Montes (baseball) =

Guatemalan-Nicaraguan baseball player (born 1995)

Juan Diego Montes

Free agent
- Outfielder
- Born: 15 May 1995 (age 31); Guatemala City, Guatemala
- Bats: Right Throws: Right

Juan Diego Montes Incer (born 15 May 1995) is a Guatemalan-Nicaraguan professional baseball outfielder who is a free agent. He plays for the Nicaragua national baseball team. Montes represented Nicaragua at the 2023 World Baseball Classic and the 2023 Central American and Caribbean Games. He has also played with Tren del Norte of the Nicaraguan Winter League and the Fieras del San Fernando of the Germán Pomares Championship.

== Professional career ==
=== Baltimore Orioles ===
Montes was born on 15 May 1995 in Guatemala City. He began playing baseball at the age of four and later played college baseball at the Universidad de San Carlos de Guatemala. On 11 November 2013, Montes was signed by the Baltimore Orioles organization after a tryout in Guatemala. He was subsequently assigned to the Dominican Summer League Orioles, where he played four seasons, from 2014 to 2017; in 170 total appearances, Montes batted .231/.360/.312 with six home runs, 57 RBI, and 41 stolen bases.

Montes spent the 2018 season with the rookie-level Gulf Coast League Orioles, batting .301/.389/.419 with two home runs, 13 RBI, and two stolen bases over 29 appearances. In 2019, he was promoted to the Aberdeen IronBirds of the Low-A New York–Penn League, where he hit .258 with four RBI and one stolen bases across 14 games. On 24 July 2019, Montes was released by the Orioles organization.

=== Roswell Invaders ===
In 2020, Montes debuted in the Nicaraguan Professional Baseball League with the Tren del Norte, winning the Rookie of the Year award. After two years of playing primarily in winter leagues, Montes signed with the Roswell Invaders of the independent Pecos League for the 2022 season. In 43 appearances for Roswell, he slashed .405/.540/.685 with eight home runs, 47 RBI, and a league-leading 42 stolen bases. Following the season, Montes was named the Mountain Division Hitter of the Year. The Invaders went on to win the Pecos League championship, defeating the Tucson Saguaros in three games.

=== Tri-City ValleyCats ===
On 2 March 2023, Montes signed with the Tri-City ValleyCats of the Frontier League. In 20 appearances for the ValleyCats, he batted .203/.317/.261 with one home run, seven RBI, and 11 stolen bases. Montes was released by Tri-City on 16 June.

== International career ==
Since Montes' mother is Nicaraguan, he is eligible to play with the Nicaragua national baseball team. He made his debut for the Nicaraguan national team at the 2023 Central American and Caribbean Games qualifiers, where the team won all five of its games and secured a spot in the tournament. He was selected to represent Nicaragua at the 2023 World Baseball Classic, where he appeared in four games, recording four hits and one double in 14 at-bats. Later that year, he was part of the Nicaraguan roster for the 2023 Central American and Caribbean Games held in San Salvador.

In February 2025, Montes was chosen to represent Nicaragua at the 2026 World Baseball Classic qualification. He batted .385, with 5 hits in 13 at-bats across Nicaragua's three victories.

=== International statistics ===
Team	Year	G	AB	R	H	2B	3B	HR	RBI	BB	SB	AVG
Nicaragua	2023	15	46	12	16	3	0	0	4	8	3	.348
Nicaragua	2025	3	13	3	5	0	0	0	0	0	2	.385
Total		18	59	15	21	3	0	0	4	8	5	.356

== Personal life ==
Montes earned a bachelor's degree in health and wellness from Purdue University Global in 2023.
