= 2013 World Baseball Classic qualification rosters =

Sixteen nations competed at the 2013 World Baseball Classic qualification.

== Key ==
Pos.	Position
P	Pitcher
C	Catcher
IF	Infielder
OF	Outfielder

== Qualifier 1 ==
=== France ===
Manager
(United States) Jim Stoeckel
Coaches
Eric Gagné

Player	No.	Pos.	DOB and age	Team	League	Birthplace
Owen Ozanich	0	P	June 23, 1989 (aged 23)	(France) Rouen Huskies	French Baseball League	Annemasse, France

=== Israel ===
Manager
(United States) Brad Ausmus
Coaches
Mark Loretta

Player	No.	Pos.	DOB and age	Team	League	Birthplace
Shawn Green	28	P	November 10, 1972 (aged 39)			Des Plaines, Illinois

=== South Africa ===
Manager
(United States) Rick Magnante
Coaches
Brian McAm

Player	No.	Pos.	DOB and age	Team	League	Birthplace
Gift Ngoepe	61	IF	January 18, 1990 (aged 22)	(United States) Pittsburgh Pirates (minors)	Major League Baseball	Randburg, South Africa

=== Spain ===
Manager
(Italy) Mauro Mazzotti
Coaches
Manny Crespo

Player	No.	Pos.	DOB and age	Team	League	Birthplace
Eric González	26	P	September 5, 1985 (aged 27)	(United States) Lake Erie Crushers	Frontier League	San Juan de la Rambla, Canary Islands
Antonio Noguera	75	P	February 26, 1988 (aged 24)	(Italy) Novara United	Italian Baseball League	Caracas, Venezuela
Manny Olivera	28	P	December 8, 1977 (aged 34)			Barcelona, Catalonia

== Qualifier 2 ==
=== Canada ===
Manager
(Canada) Ernie Whitt
Coaches
Greg Hamilton

Player	No.	Pos.	DOB and age	Team	League	Birthplace
Jimmy Van Ostrand	29	P	August 7, 1984 (aged 28)	(United States) Washington Nationals (minors)	Major League Baseball	Vancouver, British Columbia

=== Czech Republic ===
Manager
(United States) Andy Berglund
Coaches
Mike Griffin

Player	No.	Pos.	DOB and age	Team	League	Birthplace
Martin Červenka	61	C	August 3, 1992 (aged 20)			Prague, Czech Republic

=== Germany ===
Manager
(United States) Greg Frady
Coaches
Justin Pope

Player	No.	Pos.	DOB and age	Team	League	Birthplace
Max Kepler	26	IF	February 10, 1993 (aged 19)	(United States) Pittsburgh Pirates (minors)	Major League Baseball	Berlin, Germany

=== Great Britain ===
Manager
(United States) Sam Dempster
Coaches
Brian Essery

Player	No.	Pos.	DOB and age	Team	League	Birthplace
Chris Reed	61	IF	May 20, 1990 (aged 22)			London, England

== Qualifier 3 ==
=== Brazil ===
Manager
(United States) Barry Larkin
Coaches
Tiago Caldeira

Player	No.	Pos.	DOB and age	Team	League	Birthplace
Gabriel Asakura	19	P	November 11, 1988 (aged 23)	(United States) Los Angeles Dodgers (minors)	Major League Baseball	São Paulo, Brazil
Hugo Kanabushi	27	P	May 22, 1989 (aged 23)	(Japan) Yakult Swallows	Nippon Professional Baseball	Mogi das Cruzes, Brazil
Murilo Gouvea	14	P	September 15, 1988 (aged 24)	(United States) Houston Astros (minors)	Major League Baseball	Atibaia, Brazil
Rafael Fernandes	13	P	April 23, 1986 (aged 26)	(Japan) Tokyo Yakult Swallows	Nippon Professional Baseball	São Paulo, Brazil
André Rienzo	91	P	July 5, 1988 (aged 24)	(United States) Chicago White Sox (minors)	Major League Baseball	São Paulo, Brazil
Thyago Vieira	51	P	January 7, 1993 (aged 19)	(United States) Seattle Mariners (minors)	Major League Baseball	São Paulo, Brazil
Daniel Missaki	18	P	April 9, 1996 (aged 16)	(Brazil) Nippon Blue Jays	Brazil	Fujinomiya, Japan
Oscar Nakaoshi	34	P	March 28, 1991 (aged 21)	(Japan) Hakuoh University	Japan	São Paulo, Brazil
Kendy Sato	28	P	September 22, 1985 (aged 27)	(Brazil) Nippon Blue Jays	Brazil	Mogi das Cruzes, Brazil
Luiz Gohara	32	P	July 31, 1996 (aged 16)	(United States) Seattle Mariners (minors)	Major League Baseball	Tupã, Brazil
Carlos Yoshimura	17	P	December 22, 1984 (aged 27)	(Japan) Yamaha	Japan	São Paulo, Brazil
Ernesto Noris	21	P	November 24, 1971 (aged 40)	(Brazil) Atibaia	Brazil	Havana, Cuba
Felipe Burin	20	P	February 10, 1992 (aged 20)	(United States) Seattle Mariners (minors)	Major League Baseball	Marília, Brazil
Yan Gomes	26	C	July 19, 1987 (aged 25)	(United States) Toronto Blue Jays	Major League Baseball	São Paulo, Brazil
Bruno Hirata	12	C	March 12, 1988 (aged 24)	(Brazil) Nippon Blue Jays	Brazil	São Paulo, Brazil
Diego França	15	C	August 27, 1986 (aged 26)	(Japan) Nippon Mizuno	Japan	Marília, Brazil
Reinaldo Sato	4	IF	October 25, 1980 (aged 32)	(Japan) Yamaha	Japan	Mogi das Cruzes, Brazil
Tim Lopes	5	IF	June 24, 1994 (aged 18)	(United States) Seattle Mariners (minors)	Major League Baseball	Los Angeles, California, USA
Leonardo Reginatto	2	IF	April 10, 1990 (aged 22)	(United States) Tampa Bay Rays (minors)	Major League Baseball	Curitiba, Brazil
Lucas Rojo	33	IF	April 5, 1990 (aged 22)	(United States) Philadelphia Phillies (minors)	Major League Baseball	São Paulo, Brazil
Marcio Tanaka	6	IF	November 4, 1981 (aged 30)	(Brazil) Nippon Blue Jays	Brazil	São Paulo, Brazil
Pedro Okuda	24	IF	April 20, 1990 (aged 22)	(United States) Seattle Mariners (minors)	Major League Baseball	Marília, Brazil
Daniel Matsumoto	31	IF	December 15, 1980 (aged 31)	(Japan) Yakult Swallows	Nippon Professional Baseball	São Paulo, Brazil
Paulo Orlando	16	OF	November 1, 1985 (aged 27)	(United States) Kansas City Royals (minors)	Major League Baseball	São Paulo, Brazil
Jean Tomé	29	OF	September 5, 1989 (aged 23)	(Brazil) Atibaia	Brazil	Atibaia, Brazil
Tiago Magalhães	36	OF	March 18, 1981 (aged 31)	(Brazil) Nippon Blue Jays	Brazil	São Paulo, Brazil
Mike Magario	40	OF	May 5, 1992 (aged 20)	(Japan) Ryukoku University	Japan	São Paulo, Brazil
JC Muniz	9	OF	January 28, 1976 (aged 36)	(Brazil) Marília	Brazil	Havana, Cuba

=== Colombia ===
Manager
(United States) (Puerto Rico) 33 Eduardo Pérez
Coaches
(Dominican Republic) 25 Mariano Duncan, 5 Neder Horta, 35 Walter Miranda, 10 Édinson Rentería, 40 Luis Urueta

Player	No.	Pos.	DOB and age	Team	League	Birthplace
Rivar Angulo	22	P	July 1, 1991 (aged 21)	(United States) Philadelphia Phillies (minors)	Major League Baseball	Colombia
Randy Consuegra	27	P	October 14, 1989 (aged 23)	Free agent		(Colombia) Barranquilla
Dayan Díaz	14	P	February 10, 1989 (aged 23)	(United States) Houston Astros (minors)	Major League Baseball	(Colombia) Cartagena
Dumas García	34	P	July 7, 1983 (aged 29)	Free agent		(Colombia) Tuluá
Iván Julio	31	P	August 19, 1991 (aged 21)	(United States) Seattle Mariners (minors)	Major League Baseball	(Colombia) María La Baja
Sugar Ray Marimón	26	P	September 30, 1988 (aged 24)	(United States) Kansas City Royals (minors)	Major League Baseball	(Colombia) Cartagena
Oscar Meléndez	24	P	September 15, 1986 (aged 26)	(United States) Baltimore Ravens (minors)	Major League Baseball	(Venezuela) Caracas
Cristian Mendoza	32	P	May 1, 1982 (aged 30)	Free agent		(Colombia) Cartagena
Dewin Pérez	12	P	September 29, 1994 (aged 18)	(United States) St. Louis Cardinals (minors)	Major League Baseball	(Colombia) Cartagena
Ronald Ramírez	39	P	October 17, 1985 (aged 27)	Free agent		(Colombia) Cartagena
Yesid Salazar	28	P	November 2, 1986 (aged 26)	Free agent		(Colombia) Sincelejo
Luis Torres	18	P	June 6, 1980 (aged 32)	Free agent		(Venezuela) San Felipe
Karl Triana	12	P	October 7, 1992 (aged 20)	(United States) Arizona Diamondbacks (minors)	Major League Baseball	(Colombia) Cartagena
Marwin Vega	44	P	October 27, 1986 (aged 26)	Free agent		(Colombia) Barranquilla
Luis Martinez	15	C	April 3, 1985 (aged 27)	(United States) Texas Rangers	Major League Baseball	(United States) Miami
Jhonatan Solano	23	C	September 12, 1985 (aged 27)	(United States) Washington Nationals	Major League Baseball	(Colombia) Barranquilla
Ismael Castro	29	IF	August 14, 1983 (aged 29)	Free agent		(Colombia) Cartagena
Dilson Herrera	3	IF	April 3, 1994 (aged 18)	(United States) Pittsburg Pirates (minors)	Major League Baseball	(Colombia) Cartagena
Édgar Rentería	16	IF	August 7, 1975 (aged 37)	Free agent		(Colombia) Barranquilla
Reynaldo Rodríguez	30	IF	July 2, 1986 (aged 26)	(United States) Boston Red Sox (minors)	Major League Baseball	(Colombia) Cartagena
Luis Sierra	7	IF	July 23, 1987 (aged 25)	(United States) Chicago White Sox (minors)	Major League Baseball	(Colombia) Barranquilla
Donovan Solano	17	IF	December 17, 1987 (aged 24)	(United States) New York Yankees (minors)	Major League Baseball	(Colombia) Barranquilla
Iggy Suarez	2	IF	May 3, 1981 (aged 31)	(United States) Sugar Land Skeeters	Atlantic League	(United States) New York City
Gio Urshela	62	IF	October 11, 1991 (aged 21)	(United States) Cleveland Indians (minors)	Major League Baseball	(Colombia) Cartagena
Diover Ávila	11	OF	October 14, 1985 (aged 27)	Free agent		Colombia
Steve Brown	51	OF	September 3, 1986 (aged 26)	(Canada) Québec Capitales	Can-Am League	(Colombia) Barranquilla
Jolbert Cabrera	6	OF	December 8, 1972 (aged 39)	(Mexico) Pericos de Puebla	Mexican League	(Colombia) Cartagena
Luis Piterson	1	OF	June 10, 1990 (aged 22)	(United States) Kansas City Royals (minors)	Major League Baseball	(Colombia) Cartagena

=== Panama ===
Manager
(Panama) Roberto Kelly
Coaches
Einar Díaz

Player	No.	Pos.	DOB and age	Team	League	Birthplace
Euclides Bethancourt	23	P	November 13, 1983 (aged 28)	(Panama) Bocas del Toro	Panama	Panama City, Panama
Manny Corpas	56	P	December 3, 1982 (aged 29)	(United States) Chicago Cubs	Major League Baseball	Panama City, Panama
Angel Cuan	27	P	May 29, 1989 (aged 23)	(United States) New York Mets (minors)	Major League Baseball	David, Panama
Paolo Espino	36	P	January 10, 1987 (aged 25)	(United States) Cleveland Indians (minors)	Major League Baseball	Panama City, Panama
Edgar Ramirez	21	P	August 18, 1987 (aged 25)	(United States) New York Mets (minors)	Major League Baseball	Panama City, Panama
Ramiro Mendoza	55	P	June 15, 1972 (aged 40)	(Panama) Los Santos	Panama	Los Santos, Panama
Gilberto Méndez	99	P	November 15, 1974 (aged 37)	Panama Metro	Panama	Panama City, Panama
Isaac Monroy	16	P	December 10, 1983 (aged 28)	Panama Metro	Panama	Panama City, Panama
Yeuris Rodriguez	18	P	December 15, 1989 (aged 22)	(Panama) Herrera	Panama	Chitré, Panama
Many Acosta	46	P	May 1, 1981 (aged 31)	(United States) New York Mets	Major League Baseball	Panama City, Panama
Severino González	52	P	September 28, 1992 (aged 20)	(United States) Philadelphia Phillies (minors)	Major League Baseball	Santiago de Veraguas, Panama
Alberto Acosta	14	P	October 1, 1981 (aged 31)	(Panama) Bocas del Toro	Panama	Colón, Panama
Luis Machuca	22	P	April 4, 1986 (aged 26)	(Panama) Bocas del Toro	Panama	Panama City, Panama
Carlos Ruiz	20	C	January 22, 1979 (aged 33)	(United States) Philadelphia Phillies	Major League Baseball	David, Panama
Damaso Espino	8	C	May 8, 1983 (aged 29)	(United States) Chicago White Sox (minors)	Major League Baseball	Los Santos, Panama
Javier Castillo	2	IF	August 31, 1983 (aged 29)	(United States) Chicago White Sox (minors)	Major League Baseball	Chitré, Panama
Angel Chavez	5	IF	July 22, 1981 (aged 31)	(United States) Bridgeport Bluefish	Atlantic League	David, Panama
Jeffer Patiño	7	IF	November 17, 1986 (aged 25)	(Panama) Chiriquí	Panama	David, Panama
Rubén Tejada	11	IF	October 27, 1989 (aged 23)	(United States) New York Mets	Major League Baseball	Santiago de Veraguas, Panama
Ashley Ponce	12	IF	November 2, 1990 (aged 21)	(United States) Pittsburgh Pirates (minors)	Major League Baseball	David, Panama
Luis Castillo	26	IF	May 15, 1989 (aged 23)	(United States) Detroit Tigers (minors)	Major League Baseball	Aguadulce, Panama
Carlos Lee	45	OF	June 20, 1976 (aged 36)	(United States) Miami Marlins	Major League Baseball	Aguadulce, Panama
Concepcion Rodriguez	10	OF	September 19, 1986 (aged 26)	Panama Metro	Panama	Panama City, Panama
Javier Dominguez	24	OF	December 10, 1988 (aged 23)	(Panama) Los Santos	Panama	Los Santos, Panama
Luis Durango	31	OF	April 23, 1986 (aged 26)	(United States) Kansas City Royals (minors)	Major League Baseball	Panama City, Panama
Ruben Rivera	17	OF	November 14, 1973 (aged 38)	(Mexico) Delfines de Ciudad del Carmen	Mexican League	La Chorrera, Panama
Isaiah Bleasdale	9	OF	November 1, 1990 (aged 22)	(United States) Houston Astros (minors)	Major League Baseball	Panama City, Panama

=== Nicaragua ===
Manager
(Nicaragua) Dennis Martínez
Coaches
Julio Sánchez

Player	No.	Pos.	DOB and age	Team	League	Birthplace
Erasmo Ramírez	31	P	May 2, 1990 (aged 22)	(United States) Seattle Mariners	Major League Baseball	Rivas, Nicaragua
J. C. Ramírez	65	P	August 16, 1988 (aged 24)	(United States) Philadelphia Phillies (minors)	Major League Baseball	Managua, Nicaragua
Edgar Ramirez	22	P	March 20, 1986 (aged 26)	(United States) New York Mets (minors)	Major League Baseball	Managua, Nicaragua
Douglas Argüello	44	P	(United States) Free Agent	September 10, 1984 (aged 28)	Major League Baseball	Managua, Nicaragua
Mainor Mora	12	P	November 15, 1983 (aged 28)	(Nicaragua)	Nicaraguan League	León, Nicaragua
Gustavo Martinez	26	P	November 22, 1980 (aged 31)	(Nicaragua) Indios del Bóer	Nicaraguan League	Managua, Nicaragua
Uber Paz	33	P	November 3, 1986 (aged 25)	(Nicaragua) Tigres de Chinandega	Nicaraguan League	Chinandega, Nicaragua
Berman Espinoza	18	P	December 4, 1987 (aged 24)	(Nicaragua) Indios del Bóer	Nicaraguan League	Matagalpa, Nicaragua
Carlos Teller	45	P	October 3, 1986 (aged 26)	(Nicaragua) Indios del Bóer	Nicaraguan League	Managua, Nicaragua
Wilder Rayo	28	P	April 10, 1986 (aged 26)	(Nicaragua) Indios del Bóer	Nicaraguan League	Matagalpa, Nicaragua
Elvin Orozco	55	P	August 2, 1988 (aged 24)	(Nicaragua) Indios del Bóer	Nicaraguan League	Matagalpa, Nicaragua
Danilo Alvarez	23	P	April 15, 1990 (aged 22)	(Nicaragua) Indios del Bóer	Nicaraguan League	Managua, Nicaragua
Junior Téllez	27	P	January 5, 1990 (aged 22)	(Nicaragua) Indios del Bóer	Nicaraguan League	León, Nicaragua
Janior Montes	11	C	November 15, 1987 (aged 24)	(Nicaragua) Indios del Bóer	Nicaraguan League	Managua, Nicaragua
Juan Blandon	5	C	December 25, 1981 (aged 30)	(Nicaragua) Jinotega	Nicaraguan League	Jinotega, Nicaragua
Cheslor Cuthbert	24	IF	November 16, 1992 (aged 19)	(United States) Kansas City Royals (minors)	Major League Baseball	Corn Islands, Nicaragua
Everth Cabrera	2	IF	November 17, 1986 (aged 25)	(United States) San Diego Padres	Major League Baseball	Nandaime, Nicaragua
Ofilio Castro	1	IF	April 17, 1983 (aged 29)	(United States) Sugar Land Skeeters	Atlantic League	Managua, Nicaragua
Elmer Reyes	4	IF	November 20, 1990 (aged 21)	(United States) Atlanta Braves (minors)	Major League Baseball	Nagarote, Nicaragua
Ronald Garth	15	IF	May 1, 1985 (aged 27)	(Nicaragua) Indios del Bóer	Nicaraguan League	Rivas, Nicaragua
Jimmy Gonzalez	7	IF	November 1, 1978 (aged 34)	(Nicaragua) Indios del Bóer	Nicaraguan League	Chinandega, Nicaragua
Moises Flores	21	IF	February 24, 1986 (aged 26)	(Nicaragua) Esteli	Nicaraguan League	Estelí, Nicaragua
Justo Rivas	10	OF	December 16, 1979 (aged 32)	(Nicaragua) Indios del Bóer	Nicaraguan League	Masaya, Nicaragua
Dwight Britton	16	OF	June 3, 1987 (aged 25)	(Nicaragua) Indios del Bóer	Nicaraguan League	Bluefields, Nicaragua
Renato Morales	6	OF	November 3, 1986 (aged 25)	(Nicaragua) Indios del Bóer	Nicaraguan League	Masaya, Nicaragua
Jilton Calderon	19	OF	October 24, 1988 (aged 24)	(Nicaragua) Indios del Bóer	Nicaraguan League	Carazo, Nicaragua
Mark Joseph	9	OF	September 13, 1987 (aged 25)	(Nicaragua) Indios del Bóer	Nicaraguan League	Bluefields, Nicaragua
