= Fieras del San Fernando =

Nicaraguan baseball team

- Logo

Information
- League: Germán Pomares Championship; Nicaraguan Professional Baseball League (1955–1957, 2004–2006, 2014–15)
- Location: Masaya, Nicaragua
- Ballpark: Estadio Roberto Clemente
- Founded: 1915
- Nickname: Los Fernandinos
- Pomares titles: 4 (1942, 1992, 1994, 2004)
- Former name: Millonarios del San Fernando (1956)
- Colors: Orange, black
- Manager: Bismark Guadamuz

The Fieras del San Fernando (English: San Fernando Beasts) are a baseball club based in the Nicaraguan city of Masaya. Playing its home games at the Estadio Roberto Clemente, the team competes in the Germán Pomares Championship, the summer-time semi-professional baseball league of Nicaragua, and has previously fielded teams in the professional Nicaraguan Winter League. It is one of the oldest and most traditional teams in the country and is widely recognized for its passionate local support.

San Fernando has won the first division championship on four occasions: 1942, 1992, 1994, and 2004.

== History ==
The team was founded in 1915 through the merger of three local clubs — Waterloo, Argentina, and París — that competed in the Masaya departmental league. It was named after the colonial name of the city of Masaya, "Villa Fiel de San Fernando de Masaya." From its beginning the club was highly successful, winning its first 24 games.

It won its first national championship in 1942 by defeating Cinco Estrellas in a series. Players from that title-winning team included Augusto Marín, “Cojo” Gámiz, Alberta Bermúdez, Julio Ampié, José Useda, Guillermo Ríos, Ramón Corrales, Octavio Abaunza, and Agustín Castro, with Julio Selva as manager.

San Fernando participated in the Nicaraguan Professional Baseball League upon its foundation in 1955. However, the team disappeared the professional league two years later after owners decided to consolidate the markets of Masaya, Granada, and Jinotepe into one club, "Oriental". It reemerged as an amateur side in 1969 and participated in the reestablishede amateur First Division in 1970. In the 1980s, the club adopted the Fieras name.

In 2004, San Fernando was one of four teams to participated in the reestablished Nicaraguan professional winter league, along with Indios del Bóer, Tigres de Chinandega and the Leones de León. The team reached the finals twice as runners-up, in 2006 (losing to Chinandega in six games) and in 2008 (losing to Bóer in a sweep). T before returning to the amateur national circuit.

The team has since sought, unsuccessfully, to again field a team in the professional winter league.

== Stadium ==
The team plays its home games at the Estadio Roberto Clemente in Masaya. The modern stadium opened on 24 November 2023 and has a capacity of 4,024 spectators. It was built to international standards and replaced an earlier stadium of the same name on the same site.

== Identity and supporters ==
The team's supporters, often called the “Barra Fiera” or the orange-and-black barra, are considered one of the strongest and most loyal fan bases in Nicaraguan baseball. Home games in Masaya regularly draw large and energetic crowds.

== Notable players ==
- Renato Morales – Long-time captain and one of the club’s most iconic players; reached 1,500 career hits in the national league.
- Norman Cardoze
- Yader Hodgson

== See also ==
- Baseball in Nicaragua
- Germán Pomares Championship
- Estadio Roberto Clemente
