= Tren del Norte =

Tren del Norte may refer to one of two sports teams based in Estelí, Nicaragua:

- Real Estelí FC, Nicaraguan football club nicknamed Tren del Norte
- Tren del Norte (baseball), a baseball team in the Nicaraguan Professional Baseball League
