= Ronald Medrano =

Nicaraguan baseball pitcher (born 1995)

Rieleros de Aguascalientes – No. 36
- Pitcher
- Born: 17 September 1995 (age 30); Managua, Nicaragua
- Bats: Right Throws: Right

Ronald José Medrano Obando (born 17 September 1995) is a Nicaraguan professional baseball pitcher for the Rieleros de Aguascalientes of the Mexican League. Medrano represents the Nicaragua national baseball team in international competition, including the 2023 and 2026 World Baseball Classics.

== Career ==
=== Early career ===
Medrano was born on 17 September 1995 in Managua, Nicaragua. He moved to Rivas and started playing baseball with Frente Sur de Rivas.

=== St. Louis Cardinals ===
Medrano was signed by the St. Louis Cardinals organization in 2012 and was assigned to the Dominican Summer League Cardinals. He made his debut there in 2013, finishing the season with a 2–2 record with a 2.80 ERA, 35 1/3 innings pitched, 28 strikeouts and 11 base on balls in eight games.

He did not play during 2015 due to injuries. In 2016 he played for the Gulf Coast League Cardinals and the DSL Cardinals. He was released by the Cardinals on 24 June 2017.

=== Dantos de Managua ===
Medrano spent 2020 in Nicaragua, playing in the Germán Pomares Championship with Dantos de Managua. He led the league in strikeouts, with 86, setting a Dantos franchise record.

=== Tenerife Marlins ===
Medrano spent the 2022 season with the Tenerife Marlins of the Spanish Baseball League, winning the league championship and the pitching triple crown. In 12 games, he posted a 9–0 record with a 1.52 ERA, striking out 103 batters and allowing just 11 walks across 65 innings pitched.

=== Kansas City Royals ===
On 16 February 2023, Medrano signed a minor league contract with the Kansas City Royals organization. He was assigned to the Northwest Arkansas Naturals of the Double-A Texas League. In nine games, he posted a 1–1 record and 5.23 ERA with 27 strikeouts over 31 innings pitched. Medrano also played two games for the Quad Cities River Bandits of the High-A Midwest League, registering a 5.40 ERA over 2 games. He was released by the Royals organization on 18 July.

=== Rieleros de Aguascalientes ===
Considered the best pitcher in Nicaragua, Medrano was signed by the Rieleros de Aguascalientes of the Mexican League on 18 April 2024. He joined the team on the recommendation of Rafael Montalvo, then the Rieleros' pitching coach. In his debut season in the Mexican League, Medrano posted a 7–3 record with a 3.54 ERA, pitching 81 1/3 innings with 68 strikeouts and 22 walks across 15 games.

Medrano made nine starts for Aguascalientes in 2025, struggling to a 2-3 record and 7.34 ERA with 20 walks and 26 strikeouts over 38 innings of work. On 20 June 2025, Medrano was placed on the season-ending injured list.

== International career ==
=== Spain national baseball team ===
In September 2022, Medrano was called up to represent Spain in the 2023 World Baseball Classic qualification. He was eligible to play for the Spanish team as a resident of the country, having spent the 2022 season with the Tenerife Marlins of the Spanish Baseball League. Medrano appeared in two games, recording one loss with a 3.00 ERA, three walks, and 12 strikeouts over 9.0 innings pitched. Spain ultimately failed to qualify to the 2023 World Baseball Classic.

=== Nicaragua national baseball team ===
In February 2023, Medrano was called up to play for Nicaragua at the 2023 Central American and Caribbean Games qualifiers, where the team won all five of its games and secured a spot in the tournament. He appeared in two games, earning two wins without allowing a run and recording 17 strikeouts across 11.0 innings pitched. Later that year, Medrano was selected to represent Nicaragua at the 2023 World Baseball Classic. He made one appearance as the starting pitcher against Israel, pitching 2.0 scoreless innings, allowing two walks, and striking out three batters.

In February 2025, Medrano was chosen to represent Nicaragua at the 2026 World Baseball Classic qualification. He started the opening game against South Africa, pitching 5.0 innings, allowing one run for a 1.80 ERA and striking out eight batters. Medrano was named one of the 10 standout players from the qualifiers by MLB.com, as Nicaragua qualified to the 2026 tournament undefeated.

== Career statistics ==
=== International ===
| Team | Year | G | W | L | IP | H | R | ER | BB | SO | HR | ERA |
|---|---|---|---|---|---|---|---|---|---|---|---|---|
| Spain | 2022 | 2 | 0 | 1 | 9.0 | 6 | 3 | 3 | 3 | 12 | 2 | 3.00 |
| Nicaragua | 2023 | 3 | 2 | 0 | 13.0 | 5 | 0 | 0 | 3 | 20 | 0 | 0.00 |
| Nicaragua | 2025 | 1 | 0 | 0 | 5.0 | 3 | 1 | 1 | 2 | 8 | 0 | 1.80 |
| Total | | 6 | 2 | 1 | 27.0 | 14 | 4 | 4 | 8 | 40 | 2 | 1.33 |
