= Wilfredo Calviño =

Cuban baseball player (1927–1998)

- Catcher / Manager
- Born: July 20, 1927; Guantánamo, Cuba
- Died: September 4, 1998 (aged 71); Miami, Florida, U.S.
- Batted: Right Threw: Right

Wilfredo L. Calviño (July 20, 1927 — September 4, 1998) was a Cuban baseball player, manager, and scout. After a career in Minor League Baseball, he had a long career as a manager in Latin America and as a scout for Major League Baseball teams.

Calviño was born in Guantánamo and moved to Havana, where he played in the Cuban Amateur League with Club Artemisa. He debuted in organized baseball with the Havana Cubans of the Class C Florida International League in 1947. The following year, he played with several teams in the Washington Senators organization; from 1948 to 1952, he spent time playing in various leagues in the South Central United States, including the Big State, Cotton States, and Lone Star Leagues. In 1953, he returned to the Florida International League with the St. Petersburg Saints. In the professional Cuban Winter League, he played with Cienfuegos, though he would be released in 1952 to make room for American players.

After his playing career, Calviño managed extensively in the Mexican League, where he is recognized as the Cuban manager with the most appearances. He skippered the Diablos Rojos del México to a championship in the 1973 season, also managing at various points El Águila de Veracruz (1964–65), Sultanes de Monterrey (1966–67), Mineros de Coahuila (1976), Cafeteros de Córdoba (1977), and Leones de Yucatán (1981–82, 1994). He also managed in winter league baseball: in Nicaragua, he helmed Leones de León to a title in 1958 and Cinco Estrellas to one in 1964 (as well as a victory the Interamerican Series); in Venezuela, he managed Tigres de Aragua and Tiburones de La Guaira; and in Puerto Rico, he skippered the Senadores de San Juan. Fresh off his win with the Diablos Rojos in 1973, he also briefly managed the Gulf Coast League Indians in 1974.

Calviño was also a well-known scout for MLB teams in Latin America, working at various points with the Cincinnati Reds, Philadelphia Phillies, St. Louis Cardinals, and New York Yankees. He made several high-profile signings, including Dave Concepción (who played for Aragua), José Rijo, and Joaquín Andújar. However, he was criticized for reportedly recommending the New York Yankees against signing Fernando Valenzuela.

Calviño died on September 4, 1998, in Miami.
