= Danilo Bermúdez =

Nicaraguan baseball player (born 1999)

Centauros de La Guaira – No. 12
- Pitcher
- Born: 21 March 1999 (age 27); Tola, Rivas, Nicaragua
- Bats: Left Throws: Left
Medals
Men's baseball
Representing Nicaragua
Central American and Caribbean Games
Silver medal – second place	2026 Santo Domingo	Team

Danilo Bermúdez (born 21 March 1999) is a Nicaraguan professional baseball pitcher who currently plays for the Centauros de La Guaira of the Venezuelan Major League (LMBP). Bermúdez represents the Nicaragua national baseball team in international competition.

Bermúdez was born in Rivas Department, though his family has roots in Chontales Department. In Nicaragua's semi-pro league, the Germán Pomares Championship, he has represented both Rivas (Frente Sur) and Chontales (Toros). In 2021, he won a championship with the Dantos de Managua, winning MVP honors in the finals against Matagalpa. Playing with Gigantes de Rivas in the Nicaraguan Winter League, he established himself as one of the best arms in the league in the 2025–26 season.

Named to the national team for the 2026 World Baseball Classic, Bermúdez entered in relief in Nicaragua's group stage game against the Dominican Republic, picking off Julio Rodríguez to end the inning. He started Nicaragua's final game against Venezuela (the eventual champions). He went 5⅓ innings, walking one and striking out two, allowing only a single hit, a home run to Ronald Acuña Jr. Following his appearance at the WBC, he signed with Centauros de La Guaira. Bermúdez anchored Nicaragua's staff at the 2026 Central American and Caribbean Games.
