= Chase Dawson =

American baseball player (born 1998)

Schaumburg Boomers – No. 15
- Infielder
- Born: 12 June 1997 (age 28); Chesterton, Indiana, U.S.
- Bats: Left Throws: Right

Chase Richard Dawson (born June 12, 1997) is an American-Nicaraguan professional baseball infielder for the Schaumburg Boomers of the Frontier League. Having acquired Nicaraguan citizenship in 2025, he represents Nicaragua in international competition.

== Career ==
=== Amateur ===
Dawson played soccer, football, and baseball at Andrean High School, where he won back-to-back Indiana state championships in baseball in 2013 and 2014, before committing to the Valparaiso University for baseball. Over the course of four seasons with the Valparaiso Crusaders from 2016 to 2019, he played 199 games, posting a .276/.364/.382 slash line.

=== Gary SouthShore RailCats ===
Dawson signed with the Gary SouthShore RailCats of the American Association of Professional Baseball on June 11, 2019, and made his professional debut later that day, in a game against the Winnipeg Goldeyes. In 13 games with Gary, he posted a .237/.375/.395 slash line with 10 RBI and one stolen base.

=== Schaumburg Boomers ===
On June 30, 2019, Dawson was traded to the Schaumburg Boomers of the Frontier League. He made 41 appearances for the Boomers, slashing .185/.262/.233 with one home run, nine RBI, and two stolen bases. Dawson did not play in a game in 2020 due to the COVID-19 pandemic.

With Schaumburg, Dawson batted .312 in 2021, .310 in 2022, and .332 in 2023. He was named a Frontier League all-star four times, and set a league record for triples in a single season, with 24 in 2022. In 2023, he set the team's single season record for steals, with 50. As of 2024, he led the team in career numbers for starts, at-bats, hits, runs, triples, and RBI.

=== York Revolution ===
On September 3, 2024, Dawson was traded to the York Revolution of the Atlantic League of Professional Baseball. Between Schaumburg and York in 2024, he slashed 298/.383/.429 with six home runs, 69 RBI, and 47 stolen bases over 105 appearances. York went on to win the Atlantic League championship in 2024, with Dawson leading all Atlantic League hitters with four doubles in the playoffs.

Starting in the 2023–24 winter league season, Dawson has played with the Leones de León of the Nicaraguan Professional Baseball League. The team won the championship in the 2024–25 season, and Dawson represented the Nicaraguan side at the Serie de las Américas international tournament, where he batted .320, driving in three runs, stealing four bases, and collecting seven walks with an .829 OPS.

=== Bravos de León ===
On February 28, 2025, Dawson signed with the Bravos de León of the Mexican League. In 23 appearances for the León, he batted .155/.290/.172 with three RBI and five stolen bases. Dawson was released by the Bravos on May 21.

=== Schaumburg Boomers (second stint) ===
On July 26, 2025, Dawson signed with the Schaumburg Boomers of the Frontier League.

== International career ==
Dawson represents the Nicaragua national baseball team in international competition; though born in the United States, he acquired Nicaraguan citizenship in 2025 with the intention of playing for Nicaragua in the qualifiers for the 2026 World Baseball Classic, held in Taiwan. Playing as an outfielder, he batted .250, with three hits in 12 at-bats across Nicaragua's three victories, leading the team in runs batted in (with 3).
