= Len Picota =

Panamanian baseball player (born 1966)

- Pitcher
- Born: July 23, 1966 (age 60); Panama City, Panama
- Batted: Right Threw: Right

Professional debut
- CPBL: March 17, 1994, for the Mercuries Tigers
- KBO: April 7, 2002, for the Hanwha Eagles

Last appearance
- KBO: August 29, 2003, for the Hanwha Eagles
- CPBL: October 19, 2005, for the Sinon Bulls

CPBL statistics
- Win–loss record: 25–20
- Earned run average: 3.09
- Strikeouts: 265

KBO statistics
- Win–loss record: 9–12
- Earned run average: 3.63
- Strikeouts: 147
- Stats at Baseball Reference

Teams
- Mercuries Tigers (1994–1995); Taipei Gida (1997–1998); Hanwha Eagles (2002–2003); Sinon Bulls (2005)
Medals
Representing Panama
Men's Baseball
Baseball World Cup
Silver medal – second place	2003 Havana	Team

Lenin Alberto Picota (born July 23, 1966) is a Panamanian former professional baseball pitcher. He played two seasons in the KBO League for the Hanwha Eagles, and five seasons in the Chinese Professional Baseball League (CPBL) for the Mercuries Tigers, Taipei Gida, Sinon Bulls. During his career, Picota has gone by multiple names, his full name (Lenin) as well as two shortened versions (Len or Leny).

== Playing career ==
Picota — a 6 feet 1 inch (1.85 m), 185 pounds (84 kg) right-hander — was a starting pitching prospect in the St. Louis Cardinals farm system who got as high as Triple-A but never reached the major leagues. He was signed as a free agent on December 18, 1983.

Perhaps his best season in the minors was 1986, with the Savannah Cardinals. That year, he went 6–2 with a 2.00 ERA in 85 innings. Although he walked 67 and struck out only 45, the fact that he gave up only 55 hits attributed to his success. The 1988 campaign was also a good season for Picota. With the St. Petersburg Cardinals, he went 11–10 with a 2.89 ERA in 143 innings. He only gave up 130 hits that year, but he only struck out 65 batters.

In 2006 Picota represented Panama in the World Baseball Classic. He had multiple stints in international baseball leagues, including the KBO League, Mexican League, and Chinese Professional Baseball League. He also played independent league baseball with the Nashua Pride.

In 2007, Picota pitched three innings in the Pan-American Games, striking out two batters and allowing two runs. Picota was signed by the Montreal Expos at one point in his career after playing foreign ball for seven years. He was released by the team before Opening Day.

== Coaching career ==
Picota has managed extensively in Nicaragua, leading the Tigres de Chinandega to four consecutive finals appearances starting with the 2016–17 season, winning two titles. He also managed Tren del Norte and Gigantes de Rivas, as well as Dantos de Managua in the 2021 Germán Pomares Championship. He managed Indios del Bóer for the 2025 Pomares season, as well as for the 2025-26 winter league season.

He served as the manager for the Saraperos de Saltillo of the Mexican League for the 2018 and 2019 seasons.
