= Interamerican Series =

International baseball tournament for clubs

- Founded: 1946
- Abolished: 1965
- Region: North America (1946—50); South America; Caribbean
- Teams: 4
- Related competitions: Caribbean Series
- Last champions: (Nicaragua) Cinco Estrellas (1st title)
- Most championships: (United States) Buffalo All-Stars (2 titles)

The Interamerican Series (Spanish: Serie Interamericana) was an international club professional baseball tournament that brought together independent and winter league teams in North America, South America and the Caribbean. Held from 1946 to 1950 and from 1961 to 1965, it was the precursor to the modern Caribbean Series.

== History ==
The Interamerican Series was the initiative of Venezuelan businessman Jesús Corao. It came in the wake of Venezuela hosting the 1944 and 1945 Amateur World Series, the Serie Monumental that saw American Negro league all-stars play Venezuelan clubs, and the ensuing professionalization of the sport in the country, in the form of the Venezuelan League.

The inaugural series included Venezuelan champions Cerveceria Caracas, Industriales de Monterrey of the Mexican League, the Havana Cubans of the Florida International League (alternatively, the "All-Cubans"), and the Brooklyn Bushwicks, an independent semi-pro team managed by John Antonelli, with former and future Major League stars like Tony Cuccinello, Whitey Ford, and Hank Borowy. The 1946 tournament was notable for being the place where major league scout Joe Cambria signed Chico Carrasquel, then playing for Caracas. In 1947, the Bushwicks were replaced by the Buffalo All-Stars, a team of International League players managed by Buffalo Bisons manager Paul Richards. The series was suspended after 1950, as focus shifted to the Caribbean Series.

The series was resurrected in 1961 as a result of the Cuban Revolution; MLB Commissioner Ford C. Frick ruled that American major leaguers were barred from playing in Havana, which effectively scuttled the plans for the 1961 Caribbean Series. Instead, the new Serie Interamericana would replace the slot filled by the now-dissolved Cuban League with the champion of Panamanian League, with the host nation also sending an extra team. The first edition was held in Caracas, but then shifted to San Juan and Panama City. In 1964, the champion of the Nicaraguan League became the fourth team, after Venezuela opted to instead play an interleague series against the Dominican Republic.

The series struggled economically, due to the absence of Cuba as well as of the Dominican Republic, which itself was wracked in political turmoil and had been sanctioned by the Organization of American States since 1960.

== Editions ==
Year	Host	Champions	Runners-up	3rd place	4th place	Ref.
1946	(Venezuela) Caracas; Oct. 18 – Nov. 13	(United States) Brooklyn Bushwicks (9–3)	(Cuba) Havana Cubans (6–6)	(Mexico) Industriales de Monterrey (5–7)	(Venezuela) Cerveceria Caracas (4–8)	
1947	(Venezuela) Caracas; Sept. 13 – Oct. 5	(United States) Buffalo All-Stars (6–4)	(Venezuela) Cerveceria Caracas (5–5)	(Cuba) Cuban All-Stars (4–6)	—	
1948	(Venezuela) Caracas; Sept. 17 – Oct. 8	(United States) Buffalo All-Stars (7–2)	(Venezuela) Cerveceria Caracas (6–3)	Puerto Rico (3–6)	(Cuba) All Cubans (2–7)	
1949	(Venezuela) Caracas; Oct. 18 – Nov. 13	(United States) New York Stars (6–3)	(Cuba) All Cubans (5–3)	Puerto Rico (4–3)	(Venezuela) Cerveceria Caracas (1–7)	
1950	(Venezuela) Caracas; Sept. 7 – Oct. 1	(Venezuela) Cerveceria Caracas	(Cuba) All Cubans	(Puerto Rico) Senadores de San Juan	(United States) New York Black Yankees	
Not held from 1950 to 1961
1961 details	(Venezuela) Caracas; Feb 10 – 16	(Venezuela) Industriales de Valencia (5–2)	(Venezuela) Rapiños de Occidente (4–3)	(Panama) Cerveza Balboa (2–4)	(Puerto Rico) Senadores de San Juan (2–4)	
1962	(Puerto Rico) San Juan; Feb 6 – 14	(Puerto Rico) Cangrejeros de Santurce (8–1)	(Venezuela) Leones del Caracas (5–4)	(Puerto Rico) Indios de Mayagüez (4–5)	(Panama) Marlboro (1–8)	
1963	Panama City; Feb 8 – 14	(Panama) Chiriquí-Bocas (5–2)	(Nicaragua) Indios del Bóer (4–3)	(Puerto Rico) Indios de Mayagüez (3–3)	(Venezuela) Industriales de Valencia (1–5)	
1964	(Nicaragua) Managua; Feb 8 – 14	(Nicaragua) Cinco Estrellas (5–1)	(Puerto Rico) Senadores de San Juan (3–3)	(Panama) Marlboro (3–3)	(Nicaragua) Orientales de Granada (1–5)	

== Records ==
No-hitters (2)

- Sandy Consuegra (All Cubans) on September 22, 1949, vs Cerveceria Caracas
- Juan Pizarro (Mayagüez) on February 8, 1963, vs Industriales de Valencia

== Similarly-named tournaments ==
Several other tournaments in the 1950s and '60s shared the "Interamerican Series" name, though historical records are spotty. A best-of-five series played in 1951 between the Sinton Plymouth Oilers, a U.S. semi-pro team from Sinton, Texas, and Mexico's Sultanes de Monterrey, was referred to as the Interamerican Series. This tournament was organized by the International Baseball Congress, led by former MLB Commissioner Happy Chandler. Another club tournament titled Pan American Series in 1958, but also referred to as the Interamerican Series, was held in Managua in 1958, between the Venados de Mazatlán of the Mexican Pacific League, Leones de León of the Nicaraguan League, and Vanytor de Barranquilla of the Colombian League.

The Dominican Republic organized a tournament in 1965 that is sometimes referred to as the final edition of the Interamerican Series, inviting Venezuela and Puerto Rico. Major league stars like Roberto Clemente and Felipe Alou participated, but the series ended prematurely. The trophy was not formally awarded, though it is still owned by the Dominican team, Águilas Cibaeñas.

== Bibliography ==
- Javier González; Carlos Figueroa Ruiz. Campos de Gloria: El beisbol en Venezuela, 127 años de historia 1895-2022 (PDF) (in Spanish). Biblioteca Digital Banesco.
