= Wuillians Vasquez =

Venezuelan baseball player

Wuillians Vásquez

Gigantes de Rivas – No. 38
- Infielder
- Born: July 23, 1983 (age 43); Acarigua, Venezuela
- Bats: Both Throws: Right
- Stats at Baseball Reference
Medals
Men's baseball
Representing Nicaragua
Pan American Games
Bronze medal – third place	2019 Lima	Team
Representing Venezuela
Central American and Caribbean Games
Bronze medal – third place	2006 Cartagena	Team

Wuillians Martin Vásquez (born July 23, 1983) is a Venezuelan-Nicaraguan professional baseball infielder.

== Career ==
Vasquez played in the New York Yankees minor league system from 2001 to 2004, playing with the GCL Yankees, Tampa Yankees, Staten Island Yankees, and Battle Creek Yankees. In the minor leagues, he batted .229/.318/.342.

He has played for the San Marino Baseball Club in the Italian Baseball League since 2008. He also played for HCAW in Honkbal Hoofdklasse in 2010. He played for Venezuela in the 2011 Baseball World Cup and the 2011 Pan American Games.

Vasquez started playing in the Nicaraguan Professional Baseball League during the 2011–12 season. During the 2013–14 season, playing for the Tigres de Chinandega, he led the league in hitting with a .351 average. He played for Nicaragua in their unsuccessful attempt to qualify for the World Baseball Classic. However, he had only one hit in 16 at-bats.

During the 2016–17 season, playing for the Gigantes de Rivas of the Nicaraguan Winter League, he led the league in hitting (.407), home runs (11), and RBIs (55). He also tied the league record for doubles (18) and slugging (.695), and set the league record for on-base percentage (.524). He was selected Most Valuable Player.

In 2019, he was selected for Nicaragua national baseball team at the 2019 Pan American Games Qualifier, and later played at the 2019 Pan American Games. He was later selected to Team Nicaragua at the 2021 World Baseball Classic Qualifier.
