= Cinco Estrellas =

Nicaraguan baseball club (1941–1979)

Information
- League: Nicaraguan League
- Established: 1941
- Disbanded: 1979
- Nickname(s): Tigres; Generales
- Interamerican Series championships: 1964
- League championships: 2 (1963–64, 1966–67)
- Amateur championships: 1975
- Former name: Cinco Estrellas de Granada (Note: Cinco Estrellas merged with Granada during the 1957 season)
- Colors: Red, white

Cinco Estrellas (lit. Five Stars) was a Nicaraguan baseball club based in Managua. Founded in 1941, they played their home games at the Estadio Nacional General Anastasio Somoza G. (the modern Dennis Martínez National Stadium).

The team was founded by members of the Nicaragua National Guard, the military branch of the Somoza family regime, and was named in honor of Nicaraguan dictator Anastasio Somoza García (a five-star general). Its close association with the Somozas made it unpopular in the eyes of many Nicaraguans, especially compared to its biggest rival, Indios del Bóer. Its sponsorship by the Somozas was the subject of a popular joke:

"Who is the people’s team?"
"Bóer, of course."
"You are wrong, it’s Cinco Estrellas!"
"You are crazy. How so?"
"It’s paid for by the people’s taxes!"

However, at the height of the team's success in the 1950s (when its roster was staffed with the best players in the country), Cinco Estrellas did attract support even from the president's opponents. Its players were technically enlisted in the Nicaraguan National Guard, though many of them were foreigners hired to play winter ball (including a nearly all-Cuban team fielded in the early 1960s).

The club won the 1964 Serie Interamericana, held in Managua, becoming the first Nicaraguan club to win an international competition (and the only one until Gigantes de Rivas won the 2016 Latin American Series).

Cinco Estrellas folded in 1979, the year the Somozas were overthrown by the Nicaraguan Revolution. The Sandinistas changed the name to Dantos, a team which continues to play in the Nicaraguan amateur baseball league, the Germán Pomares Ordóñez First Division.

== Notable players ==
- Marv Throneberry
- Pete Pavlick (manager)
- Mike Blyzka
- Stanley Cayasso
- Art López
- Silvio García
- Claro Duany
- Zoilo Versalles
- Luis Tiant
- Danny Morejón
- Sandy Valdespino
- Pumpsie Green
- Rogelio Álvarez
- Evelio Hernández
- Joe Shipley
- Ossie Álvarez
- Bill Short
- Richie Scheinblum
- Jim Weaver
- Mania Torres
- Mike Cuellar

== Interamerican Series record ==
Year	Venue	Finish	Wins	Losses	Win%	Manager
1964	(Nicaragua) Managua	1st	5	1	.833	(Cuba) Wilfredo Calviño
Total			5	1	.833	

== Bibliography ==
- Mayer, Braeden Diego (Fall 2012). "Jugando con Bola Ensalivada: Una Historia Política del Béisbol Nicaragüense desde Somoza hasta Ortega". Independent Study Project (ISP) Collection (in Spanish) (1426).
