= Estadio Nacional Soberanía =

Nicaraguan stadium

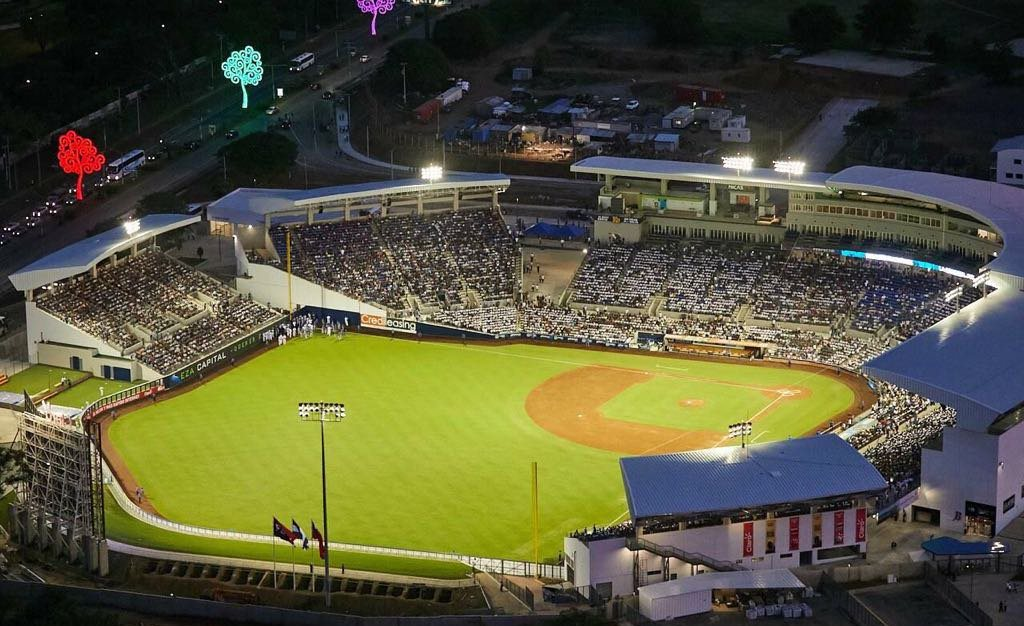
- Interactive map of Estadio Nacional Soberanía
- Former names: Estadio Nacional Dennis Martínez (2017-2022)
- Location: Managua, Nicaragua
- Coordinates: 12.1344°N 86.2693°W
- Owner: Government of Nicaragua
- Capacity: 15,000
- Surface: Grass

Construction
- Opened: 20 October 2017

Tenants
- Nicaragua national baseball team Indios del Bóer (LBPN); Dantos de Managua (GPO)

Estadio Nacional Soberanía is located in Managua, Nicaragua. It has a capacity of 15,000 seated spectators. The stadium was built in 2017 as the Estadio Nacional Dennis Martínez, named after former Major League Baseball player Dennis Martínez, as a replacement for Managua's previous Estadio Nacional (built in 1948)

It is used mainly for baseball but also serves as a venue for concerts, boxing, football, religious events and had a capacity of 30,100 people. It is the home stadium of Indios del Bóer baseball team and the Nicaragua national baseball team. Inside the stadium is a hall of fame near the entrance showing medals, cups, photos and memories of Nicaraguan players. There is also a gym located inside.

The Dennis Martínez National Stadium was sponsored by the Taiwan government and began construction in 2016. It was completed in October 2017. The first sports event in the stadium was the baseball series of three games between Nicaragua and Chinese Taipei (Taiwan) on from 20 to 22 October 2017.

It played host to the Central American Games in 2017. The stadium, located near the Tiscapa Lagoon, is approximately 3 kilometers southeast of the original stadium. It was designed by Dynamica and it has a capacity of 15,000. The field meets Major League Baseball specifications and could potentially host a Major League Baseball game.

In December 2022, the stadium name was changed to the current Estadio Nacional Soberanía.

== See also ==
- Nicaragua
- Culture of Nicaragua
