= Nicaraguan Professional Baseball League =

Top-level baseball league

- Sport: Baseball
- Founded: 1956 (original incarnation); 2025 (modern entity)
- Commissioner: Cristhian Jiménez
- No. of teams: 5
- Country: Nicaragua
- Most recent champions: Leones de León (9th title)
- Most titles: Indios del Bóer (9 titles)
- Website: laprofesionalapbn.com.ni

Nicaraguan Professional Baseball League team locations

The Nicaraguan Professional Baseball Association (Spanish: Asociación Profesional de Béisbol Nicaragüense or APBN), also known as the Campeonato Claro for sponsorship purposes, is the highest level of professional baseball in Nicaragua.

Professional baseball in the country began in 1956 and ran until 1967. For much of the late 20th century, professional baseball was supplanted by the amateur Germán Pomares Championship, until the reestablishment of the Nicaraguan Professional Baseball League (Spanish: Liga de Béisbol Profesional Nacional or LBPN) in 2004. Since then, Bóer has led the league in championships with six, their most recent victory coming in the 2022–23 season. In 2025, the LBPN was dissolved by the Nicaraguan government and replaced by the APBN.

== History ==
Before the formation of the professional league, Nicaraguan baseball had long been played at the amateur level. However, the first club to sign a player to a professional baseball was San Fernando, signing several Cuban players for the 1955. The following year, the entire league embraced professionalism. The Nicaraguan professional league was formed in 1956, with five teams: Indios del Bóer, Cinco Estrellas, San Fernando, León, and Flor de Caña. Inaugurated on March 30, 1956 at the Estadio Nacional Anastasio Somoza (the site of the modern Estadio Nacional Soberanía), the first game was between San Fernando and Bóer. The first season was suspended in September 1956 due to the assassination of Anastasio Somoza García, but the tournament resumed in March 1957.

The league initially operated on a summer schedule, but was converted to a winter league when it agreed to join organized baseball in 1957. This agreement was facilitated by President Luis Somoza Debayle as part of a resolution between the Nicaraguan league and organized baseball, which accused the league of "raiding" players from Mexican League clubs.

The Nicaraguan public's excitement for baseball grew as foreign professional teams and foreign players came to play in their country's winter league circuit. The teams from Bóer and León were the most successful teams in those years with three championships each. Due to economic difficulties, the league had to shut down in 1967, though baseball continued to be played in an amateur format.

Professional baseball was re-established in Nicaragua in 2004 with four teams: Indios de Bóer, Leones de León, Fieras del San Fernando, and Tigres de Chinandega. The Gigantes de Rivas were established in 2013. Oriental de Granada also joined in 2013, but folded in 2017 and was replaced by a returning incarnation of the Leones. In 2020, the league added Tren del Norte as its fifth franchise.

On August 14, 2025, the National Police of Nicaragua raided the LBPN offices after reports that the league's president, Pancasán Arce, had fled the country; Arce's father, FSLN minister Bayardo Arce, had been arrested by the Nicaraguan government two weeks earlier. On September 8, 2025, the Ministry of the Interior announced it would dissolve the LBPN and replace it with a new entity, the Nicaraguan Professional Baseball Association, to be led by Commissioner Cristhian Jimenez, a loyalist of the Ortega-Murillo regime. The same five teams would remain in the new league, with the addition of a sixth team, Dantos de Managua, for the 2026–27 season.

== Current teams ==
Team	City	Stadium	Capacity	Founded	Joined
Indios del Bóer	Managua	Estadio Nacional Soberanía	15,000	1905	1956
Tigres de Chinandega	Chinandega	Estadio Efraín Tijerino	8,000	1972	2004
Gigantes de Rivas	Rivas	Estadio Yamil Ríos Ugarte	7,000	2013	
Leones de León	León	Estadio Rigoberto López Pérez	7,200	1945	1956
Tren del Norte	Estelí	Estadio Rufo Marín	1,200	2020	
Dantos de Managua	Managua	Estadio Nacional Soberanía	15,000	1981	2026

=== Defunct teams ===
- Cinco Estrellas
- Orientales de Granada
- Fieras del San Fernando

=== Defunct stadiums ===
- Estadio Roberto Clemente, Masaya
- Estadio Roque Tadeo Zavala, Granada

== Champions ==
Key
†	Champions also won the Latin American Series that season
†	Champions also won the Interamerican Series that season

Season	Champion	Final series	Runners up	Manager
1956	Season suspended due to the assassination of Anastasio Somoza García			
1957	Leones de León			Tony Castaño
1957–58	Leones de León (2)	4–2	Cinco Estrellas	Wilfredo Calviño
1958–59	Oriental	4–3	Indios del Bóer	Roberto Fernandez Tapanes
1959–60	Leones de León (3)	4–1	Cinco Estrellas	Julio Moreno
1960–61	Season canceled due to extreme weather			
1961–62	Cigarilleros del Marlboro (Note: The Nicaraguan league merged with the Panamanian Professional Baseball League for the 1961–62 season. That year, the champion was Marlboro, a Panama-based team.)	4–2	Indios del Bóer	Stanford Graham
1962–63	Indios del Bóer	2–1	Leones de León	Tony Castaño
1963–64	Cinco Estrellas ^{†}	4–2	Oriental	Wilfredo Calviño
1964–65	Indios del Bóer (2)	4–2	Round robin (Note: The 1964–65 playoffs were held in a round-robin format, as all four clubs finished the regular season with an identical record. Leon and Cinco Estrellas both tied for second, going 3–3 in the round-robin playoffs)	Calvin Byron
1965–66	Indios del Bóer (3)	4–1	Leones de León	Calvin Byron
1966–67	Cinco Estrellas (2)	4–3	Indios del Bóer	Julio Moreno
No professional baseball from 1967 to 2004
2004–05	Leones de León (4)	4–3	Tigres de Chinandega	Noel Areas
2005–06	Tigres de Chinandega	4–2	Fieras del San Fernando	Jorge Fuentes
2006–07	Indios del Bóer (4)	4–0	Leones de León	Noel Areas
2007–08	Indios del Bóer (5)	4–2	Fieras del San Fernando	Lourdes Gourriel
2008–09	Season suspended			
2009–10	Leones de León (5)	4–1	Oriental de Granada	Roger Guillén
2010–11	Indios del Bóer (6)	4–1	Tigres de Chinandega	Noel Areas
2011–12	Indios del Bóer (7)	4–2	Tigres de Chinandega	Julio César Sanchez
2012–13	Tigres de Chinandega (2)	4–2	Oriental de Granada	Germán Mesa
2013–14	Gigantes de Rivas	4–1	Indios del Bóer	Manny Collado
2014–15	Indios del Bóer (8)	4–2	Gigantes de Rivas	Javier Colina
2015–16	Gigantes de Rivas (2) ^{†}	4–3	Oriental de Granada	Germán Mesa
2016–17	Tigres de Chinandega (3) ^{†}	4–1	Gigantes de Rivas	Len Picota
2017–18	Tigres de Chinandega (4) ^{†}	4–1	Gigantes de Rivas	Len Picota
2018–19	Leones de León (6) ^{†}	4–1	Tigres de Chinandega	Sandor Guido
2019–20	Leones de León (7)	4–1	Tigres de Chinandega	Sandor Guido
2020–21	Gigantes de Rivas (2)	4–2	Tigres de Chinandega	Joel Fuentes
2021–22	Leones de León (8)	4–3	Gigantes de Rivas	Sandor Guido
2022–23	Indios del Bóer (9)	4–2	Gigantes de Rivas	Joel Fuentes
2023–24	Gigantes de Rivas (3)	4–2	Tren del Norte	Germán Mesa
2024–25	Leones de León (9)	4–3	Tren del Norte	Sandor Guido
2025–26	Leones de León (10)	4–3	Gigantes de Rivas	Sandor Guido

=== Championships by team ===
Rank	Team	Wins	Years
1	Leones de León	10	1957, 1957–58, 1959–60, 2004–05, 2009–10, 2018–19, 2019–20, 2021–22, 2024-25, 2025-26
2	Indios del Bóer	9	1962–63, 1964–65, 1965–66, 2006–07, 2007–08, 2010–11, 2011–12, 2014–15, 2022–23
3	Tigres de Chinandega	4	2005–06, 2012–13, 2016–17, 2017–18
4	Gigantes de Rivas	3	2013–14, 2020–21, 2023–24
5	Cinco Estrellas	2	1963–64, 1966–67
6	Oriental	1	1958–59
6	Cigarilleros del Marlboro	1	1961–62

== International competition ==
From its inception, the Nicaraguan professional league sought to participate in international club competition. It hosted a tournament billed as the Serie Panamericana, or Pan-American Series, in 1958, inviting the champions of the Colombian and Mexican Pacific Leagues. This tournament, won by Leones de León, was a success; Nicaraguan organizers hoped it would allow them to join the Caribbean Series, but such an invitation was not forthcoming.

The LBPN did participate in the Interamerican Series three times in the 1960s, while the Caribbean Series was suspended. It hosted the 1964 edition, which was won by Cinco Estrellas.

Nicaragua was an inaugural member of the Latin American Series, winning the tournament four times in the 2010s.

The LBPN would not participate in the Caribbean Series until 2024, when it was invited to participate in the tournament in Miami. Their entry was controversial, because it was alleged that the regime of Daniel Ortega offered $1 million to the Caribbean Professional Baseball Confederation to secure the participation in the tournament.

=== Interamerican Series champions ===
Season	Winner
1964	Cinco Estrellas

=== Latin American Series champions ===
Season	Winner
2016	Gigantes de Rivas
2017	Tigres de Chinandega
2018	Tigres de Chinandega
2019	Leones de León

== Individual leaders by year ==
=== Hitting ===
==== Batting average ====
Season	Player	Team	AVG
2004–05	(Nicaragua) Adolfo Matamoros	Chinandega	.378
2005–06	(Cuba) Bárbaro Cañizares	Bóer	.352
2006–07	(Nicaragua) Justo Rivas	León	.377
2007–08	(Nicaragua) Ofilio Castro	San Fernando	.351
2009–10	(Nicaragua) Jimmy González	Granada	.363
2010–11	(Dominican Republic) José Campusano	Bóer	.363
2011–12	(Nicaragua) Renato Morales	Granada	.387
2012–13	(Curaçao) Yurendell DeCaster	Chinandega	.416
2013–14	(Nicaragua) Wuillians Vasquez	Chinandega	.351
2014–15	(Curaçao) Yurendell DeCaster	Rivas	.368
2015–16	(Venezuela) Jonel Pacheco	Chinandega	.427
2016–17	(Nicaragua) Wuillians Vasquez	Rivas	.407
2017–18	(Mexico) Javier Robles	Bóer	.354
2018–19	(Nicaragua) Elmer Reyes	Bóer	.360
2019–20	(Nicaragua) Ofilio Castro	León	.409
2020–21	(Nicaragua) Ronald Garth	León	.400
2021–22	(Cuba) Alay Largo	Tren	.424
2022–23	(Nicaragua) Manuel Geraldo	Bóer	.355
2023–24	(Nicaragua) Omar Mendoza	Chinandega	.358
2024–25	(Dominican Republic) Sabriel Polanco	Tren	.369
2025–26	(Dominican Republic) Deivi Muñoz	Tren	.385

==== Home runs ====
Season	Player	Team	HR
2004–05	(Panama) Luis Iglesias	Chinandega	4
2004–05	(Nicaragua) Marlon Abea	San Fernando	4
2004–05	(Cuba) Michel Abreu	Bóer	14
2006–07	(United States) Clyde Williams	Bóer	16
2007–08	(United States) Luke Gorsett	Chinandega	6
2007–08	(United States) Jimmy Hurst	San Fernando	6
2007–08	(Nicaragua) Marcos Sánchez	San Fernando	6
2009–10	(Nicaragua) Lenín Aragón	Bóer	6
2010–11	(United States) Brian Nichols	León	10
2011–12	(Nicaragua) Esteban Ramírez	Chinandega	12
2012–13	(Curaçao) Yurendell DeCaster	Chinandega	13
2012–13	(Nicaragua) Ramón Flores	Chinandega	13
2013–14	(Nicaragua) Ronald Garth	Granada	8
2014–15	(Dominican Republic) Rudy Van Heydoorm	Rivas	6
2015–16	(Nicaragua) Juan C. Torres	Granada	6
2016–17	(Nicaragua) Wuillians Vasquez	Rivas	11
2017–18	(Curaçao) Curt Smith	Chinandega	6
2018–19	(Dominican Republic) Juan Silverio	Bóer	6
2019–20	(Venezuela) Alvaro Gonzalez	Chinandega	10
2020–21	(Nicaragua) Cheslor Cuthbert	Rivas	9
2020–21	(Nicaragua) Willy García	Tren	9
2021–22	(Nicaragua) Willy García	Tren	11
2022–23	(Dominican Republic) Manuel Geraldo	Bóer	7
2023–24	(Nicaragua) Jesus Lopez	Chinandega	8
2024–25	(Curaçao) Ademar Rifaela	Bóer	12
2025–26	(Curaçao) Ademar Rifaela	Bóer	10

==== Runs batted in ====
Season	Player	Team	RBI
2004–05	(Nicaragua) Marlon Abea	San Fernando	33
2005–06	(Dominican Republic) Wilson Batista	Chinandega	42
2006–07	(United States) Clyde Williams	Bóer	40
2007–08	(Nicaragua) Danilo Sotelo	San Fernando	32
2009–10	(Nicaragua) Lenín Aragón	Bóer	38
2009–10	(Nicaragua) Edgard López	León	38
2010–11	(Dominican Republic) Manuel Mejía	Bóer	37
2011–12	(Nicaragua) Wuillians Vasquez	Bóer	51
2012–13	(Curaçao) Yurendell DeCaster	Chinandega	56
2013–14	(Nicaragua) Esteban Ramírez	Chinandega	35
2014–15	(Nicaragua) Ramón Flores	Rivas	38
2015–16	(Nicaragua) Ronald Garth	Chinandega	30
2016–17	(Nicaragua) Wuillians Vasquez	Rivas	55
2017–18	(Nicaragua) Elmer Reyes	Rivas	34
2018–19	(Dominican Republic) Juan Silverio	Bóer	19
2019–20	(Nicaragua) Elian Miranda	Chinandega	31
2019–20	(Venezuela) Alvaro Gonzalez	Chinandega	31
2020–21	(Dominican Republic) Héctor Gómez	Tren	41
2021–22	(Cuba) Alay Largo	Tren	45
2022–23	(Dominican Republic) Manuel Geraldo	Bóer	31
2023–24	(Nicaragua) Omar Mendoza	Chinandega	29
2024–25	(United States) Chase Dawson	León	37
2025–26	(Curaçao) Ademar Rifaela	Bóer	33

=== Pitching ===
==== Earned run average ====
Season	Player	Team	ERA
2004–05	(Nicaragua) Julio Raudez	San Fernando	1.46
2005–06	(Nicaragua) Wilton López	León	1.34
2006–07	(Nicaragua) José Luis Sáenz	San Fernando	1.96
2007–08	(Nicaragua) Wilton López	León	1.45
2009–10	(Nicaragua) Wilfredo Amador	León	1.95
2010–11	(Nicaragua) Carlos Estrella	Granada	1.19
2011–12	(United States) Eric Blackwell	León	2.75
2012–13	(Nicaragua) Wilder Rayo	León	2.06
2013–14	(Nicaragua) Carlos Estrella	Rivas	1.62
2014–15	(Dominican Republic) Rodney Rodríguez	Bóer	2.29
2015–16	(United States) Austin Davis	Bóer	1.12
2016–17	(Dominican Republic) Gustavo Martínez	Granada	1.95
2017–18	(Nicaragua) Jorge Bucardo	Bóer	1.56
2018–19	(Dominican Republic) Luis Angel Mateo	León	3.29
2019–20	(United States) Isaac Silva	León	2.59
2020–21	(Nicaragua) Leónardo Crawford	Rivas	2.65
2021–22	(Nicaragua) Bryan Torres	Rivas	0.81
2022–23	(Mexico) Edgard Martinez	Tren	2.22
2023–24	(Nicaragua) Yeris Gonzalez	Chinandega	1.69
2024–25	(Dominican Republic) Ismael Cabrera Taveras	León	1.11
2025–26	(Brazil) Tiago da Silva	Rivas	0.98

==== Win-loss record ====
Season	Player	Team	W-L
2004–05	(Nicaragua) Julio Raudez	San Fernando	10–3
2005–06	(Nicaragua) Julio Raudez	Chinandega	10–0
2006–07	(Nicaragua) Wilton López	León	8–2
2007–08	(Nicaragua) Diego Sandino	San Fernando	10–0
2009–10	(Nicaragua) Wilder Rayo	León	7–2
2010–11	(Dominican Republic) Rodney Rodríguez	Granada	8–5
2011–12	(Nicaragua) Wilder Rayo	León	8–3
2012–13	(Dominican Republic) Juan Figueroa	Granada	7–1
2013–14	(Dominican Republic) Carlos Téller	Bóer	7–0
2014–15	(Venezuela) Paul Estrada	Chinandega	8–1
2015–16	(Venezuela) Roger Luque	Granada	5–2
2016–17	(Dominican Republic) José Rosario	Rivas	7–1
2017–18	(Dominican Republic) Manauris Baez	Bóer	5–0
2018–19	(Nicaragua) Jorge Bucardo	León	3–0
2019–20	(Dominican Republic) Carlos Sano	Chinandega	4–0
2020–21	(Dominican Republic) Willy Paredes	León	6–1
2021–22	(Nicaragua) Ronald Medrano	Rivas	5–0
2022–23	(Dominican Republic) Yeudy García	Bóer	5–0
2023–24	(Dominican Republic) Luis Ramirez	Tren	6–2
2024–25	(Nicaragua) Bryan Torres	León	7–0
2025–26	(Brazil) Tiago da Silva	Rivas	8–0

==== Strikeouts ====
Season	Player	Team	SO
2004–05	(Cuba) Miguel Pérez	León	99
2005–06	(Nicaragua) Devern Hansack	León	89
2006–07	(Dominican Republic) Willy Lebrón	San Fernando/León	89
2007–08	(Dominican Republic) Juan Figueroa	Bóer	60
2009–10	(Dominican Republic) Melvin Cuevas	Granada	57
2010–11	(Dominican Republic) Rodney Rodríguez	Granada	93
2011–12	(Dominican Republic) Juan Figueroa	Granada	74
2012–13	(Dominican Republic) Juan Figueroa	Granada	79
2013–14	(Panama) Santos Hernández	Granada	71
2014–15	(Dominican Republic) Rodney Rodríguez	Bóer	58
2015–16	(Venezuela) Paul Estrada	Rivas	52
2015–16	(Mexico) Abraham Elvira	Chinandega	52
2016–17	(Dominican Republic) Frankie de la Cruz	Granada	58
2017–18	(Venezuela) Paul Estrada	Bóer	49
2018–19	(Dominican Republic) Luis Angel Mateo	León	35
2019–20	(Dominican Republic) Carlos Sano	Chinandega	37
2020–21	(Dominican Republic) Alexander Santana	Chinandega	47
2021–22	(Dominican Republic) Pedro Fernández	Chinandega	71
2022–23	(Nicaragua) Ronald Medrano	Rivas	57
2023–24	(Cuba) Yoanner Negrín	León	42
2024–25	(Dominican Republic) Luis E Peña	León	57
2025–26	(Brazil) Tiago da Silva	Rivas	51

== See also ==
- Germán Pomares Championship, Nicaragua's summer baseball league
- Latin American Series
- Serie de las Américas
- Baseball awards#Nicaragua
