= Leones de León =

Nicaraguan baseball team

- Logo

Information
- League: Nicaraguan Professional Baseball League
- Location: León, Nicaragua
- Ballpark: Estadio Rigoberto López Pérez
- Established: 1945 (original incarnation); 2017 (modern franchise)
- Latin American Series championships: 2019
- League championships: 10 (1957, 1957–58, 1959–60, 2004–05, 2009–10, 2018–19, 2019–20, 2021–22, 2024-25, 2025-26)
- Former name: Mets de San Felipe; Mets de León; Melenudos de León
- Colors: Black, gold, white (APBN) Blue, red, white (Pomares)
- Manager: Sandor Guido

The Leones de León are a professional baseball team competing in the Nicaragua Professional Baseball League (APBN). Their home games are played at Estadio Rigoberto López Pérez in León, Nicaragua. Their biggest rival is Indios del Bóer, which are based in the capital of Managua.

Leones also fields a team in Nicaragua's summer league, the Germán Pomares Ordóñez First Division, representing the department of the same name, albeit with different colors (blue and red) and management from the professional team. The team is historically the most successful in the first division.

== History ==
In 1957, the first full season of professional baseball in Nicaragua, the "Melenudos de León" (León Mane-men) were skippered by manager Tony Castaño, whose pitching staff included Conrado Marrero, formerly of the Washington Senators. In the following 1957–58 season, Cuban pitcher Manuel Montejo of León threw the country's first professional no-hitter, in a 5–0 win over Cinco Estrellas on November 5, 1957.

Leones won the 1958 Pan American Series (Serie Panamericana), a one-off international club tournament against Venados de Mazatlán of the Mexican Pacific League and Vanytor de Barranquilla of the Colombian league. They also won the 2019 Latin American Series, the other counterpart of Caribbean Series, in a final game against the Chileros de Xalapa of the Mexican Liga Invernal Veracruzana.

The team has also won the most titles in Nicaragua's amateur league, the Germán Pomares Ordóñez First Division (Campeonato Nacional de Béisbol Superior Germán Pomares Ordoñez), with 20 (1939, 1943, 1960, 1962–64, 1967, 1968, 1973, 1974, 1981, 1983, 1984, 1986, 1990, 1997, 1999, 2001, 2003, and 2019).

With the return of professional baseball in 2004, Leones were one of four teams in the new professional league. After a brief absence, the team returned to the professional league for the 2017–18 season, as a replacement for the defunct Orientales de Granada.

Leones previously played their home games at the Estadio Héroes y Mártires de Septiembre, which held a capacity of 3,328 spectators. Since 2024, they have played at the new Estadio Rigoberto López Pérez.

== Championships ==
Season	Manager	Opponent	Series score
1957	Tony Castaño	—	
1957–58	Wilfredo Calviño	Cinco Estrellas	4–2
1959–60	Julio Moreno	Cinco Estrellas	4–1
2004–05	Noel Areas	Tigres de Chinandega	4–3
2009–10	Roger Guillén	Oriental de Granada	4–1
2018–19	Sandor Guido	Tigres de Chinandega	4–1
2019–20	Sandor Guido	Tigres de Chinandega	4–1
2021–22	Sandor Guido	Gigantes de Rivas	4–3
2024–25	Sandor Guido	Tren del Norte	4–3
2025–26	Sandor Guido	Gigantes de Rivas	4–3
Total championships			10

== International competition ==
=== Latin American Series record ===
Year	Venue	Finish	Wins	Losses	Win%	Manager
2019	(Mexico) Veracruz	1st	7	0	1.000	(Nicaragua) Sandor Guido
Total			7	0	1.000	

=== Serie de las Américas record ===
Year	Venue	Finish	Wins	Losses	Win%	Manager
2025	(Nicaragua) Managua	2nd	5	2	.714	(Nicaragua) Sandor Guido
2026	(Venezuela) Great Caracas	5th	2	4	.333	(Nicaragua) Sandor Guido
Total			7	6	.538	

== Roster ==
Leones de León roster – 2024–25 LPBN champions
Players		Coaches
Pitchers: 23 (Dominican Republic) José Acosta; 79 (Nicaragua) Joaquin Acuña; 98 (Nicaragua) Alvaro Amador; 30 (Dominican Republic) Ismael Cabrera Taveras; 5 (United States) Cole Cook; 29 (Nicaragua) Ernesto Glasgon; 33 (United States) Aaron Glickstein; 27 (Dominican Republic) Janser Lara; 54 (Nicaragua) Walter Lopez; 32 (Nicaragua) Dilmer Mejia; 48 (Dominican Republic) Luis Peña; 14 (Nicaragua) Joshua Quezada; 42 (Dominican Republic) Jean Carlo Sandoval; 77 (Nicaragua) Junior Tellez; 78 (Nicaragua) Bryan Torres	Catchers: 36 (Italy) Alberto Mineo; 43 (Nicaragua) Leonardo Ortiz; Infielders: 17 (Nicaragua) Benjamin Alegria; 24 (Canada) Kaiden Cardoso; 44 (Dominican Republic) Miguel Angel Hiraldo; 20 (Nicaragua) Saul Orozco; 2 (Nicaragua) Renato Morales; 31 (Nicaragua) Alvaro Rubi; Outfielders: 3 (Nicaragua) Dwight Britton; 4 (United States) Alec Craig; 97 (United States) Chase Dawson; 15 (United States) Caleb McNeely; 22 (Nicaragua) Isaac Mondragon; 65 (Venezuela) Jairo Perez; 12 (Aruba) Jiandido Tromp	Manager: 7 (Nicaragua) Sandor Guido; Coaches: 13 (Puerto Rico) Juan Lopez; 88 (Venezuela) Gustavo Salcedo; 59 (Nicaragua) Jenrry Roa; 69 (Venezuela) Nery Carmona; 10 (Nicaragua) Yader Roa; 16 (Nicaragua) Barney Baltodano; 96 (Venezuela) Luis Alen; Roster updated on 13 April 2025
