= Tren del Norte (baseball) =

Nicaraguan baseball team

- Logo

Information
- League: Nicaraguan Professional Baseball League
- Location: Estelí, Nicaragua
- Ballpark: Estadio Rufo Marín
- Colors: Red, white

Tren del Norte (English: Northern Train) is a baseball club that competes in the Nicaragua Professional Baseball League (APBN), representing the city of Estelí. The team is owned by the same owners as Real Estelí FC, founded in 1961 and also nicknamed Tren del Norte.

Tren del Norte was established as the fifth club in Nicaraguan professional baseball in the 2020–21 season, with its first manager being Len Picota, a veteran of the Tigres de Chinandega. In its inaugural season, the team fielded major leaguers Héctor Gómez, Alfredo Fígaro, and Everth Cabrera, as well as Juan Diego Montes. Its first game was a 4–3 victory over Chinandega.

In its second season, the team struggled and cycled through three managers, Ender Chávez, Ramiro Toruño, and Aníbal Vega, before ultimately clinching a playoff berth. However, Vega was fired into the 2022–23 season. The team finished first in the 2023–24 regular season, earning its first finals berth under manager Tony Rodríguez, but fell to Gigantes de Rivas in the final.

== Roster ==
Tren del Norte roster – 2025–26 APBN season
| Players | | Coaches |
| Pitchers: 57 (Nicaragua) Pedro Torres; 37 (Nicaragua) Carlos Teller; 31 (Nicaragua) Norman St. Clair; 55 (Nicaragua) Roniel Raudes; 15 (Dominican Republic) Luis Ramirez; 17 (Dominican Republic) Naswell Paulino; 40 (Dominican Republic) Estalin Ortiz; 14 (Nicaragua) Stanling Orozco; 24 (Nicaragua) Elder Martinez; 19 (Nicaragua) Elias Gutierrez; 66 (Nicaragua) Santos Gomez; 43 (Dominican Republic) Benito García; 28 (United States) Antonio Frias; 32 (Nicaragua) Keny Cruz; 62 (Cuba) Franny Cobos | Catchers: 12 (Venezuela) Oscar Campos; 1 (United States) Nolan Cruz; 41 (Puerto Rico) José J. Rivera; Infielders: 35 (Nicaragua) Haxel Carrasco; 9 (Cuba) Alay Largo; 6 (Dominican Republic) Deivi Muñoz; 2 (Nicaragua) Omar Obregon; 11 (Panama) Abraham Rodríguez; 34 (Nicaragua) Emanuel Trujillo; Outfielders: 10 (Venezuela) Ramón Flores; 13 (Nicaragua) Sandy Bermúdez; 44 (United States) Yassel Pino; 27 (Dominican Republic) Sabriel Polanco; 18 (Cuba) Raico Santos; 99 (Guatemala) Juan Montes | Manager: 4 (Puerto Rico) Joel Fuentes; Coaches: 33 (Nicaragua) Moises Flores (1st base); 77 (Puerto Rico) Eduardo Galarza (3rd base); 46 (Dominican Republic) Julio Bruno (Bench); 45 (Venezuela) Dan Urbina (Pitching); 89 (Nicaragua) José Luis Quiroz (Pitching); Roster updated on 30 June 2026 |
