= Indios del Bóer =

Nicaraguan baseball club

Logo	Cap insignia

Information
- League: Nicaraguan Professional Baseball League
- Location: Managua, Nicaragua
- Ballpark: Estadio Nacional Soberania
- Founded: 1905
- Nickname: La Tribu (The Tribe)
- League championships: 9 (1962–63, 1964–65, 1965–66, 2006–07, 2007–08, 2010–11, 2011–12, 2014–15, 2022–23)
- Colors: Dark blue, red and white
- President: Yader Solís
- Manager: Len Picota
- Website: www.indiosdelboer.com

Current uniforms
Home	Away

The Indios del Bóer (lit. Boer Indians) are a baseball club based in Managua, Nicaragua competing in the Nicaraguan Professional Baseball League (LBPN). Their home games are played at the Estadio Nacional Soberanía (previously the Estadio Nacional Dennis Martínez), Nicaragua's largest baseball stadium. Established in 1905, the club is commonly referred to as La Tribu (The Tribe), and has won the Nicaraguan professional championship nine times.

== History ==
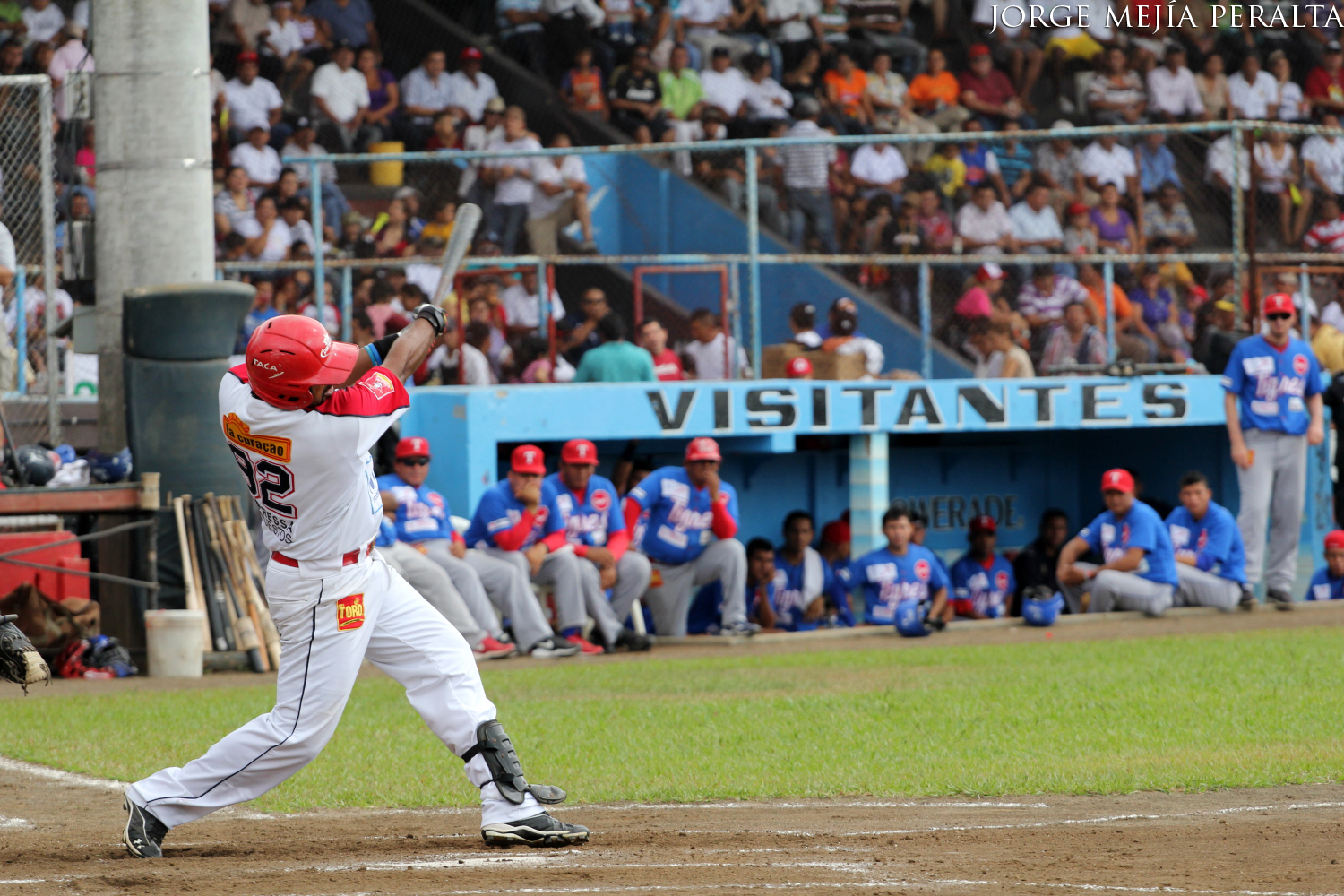
Indios batter at the plate during the 2012 championship series.

Indios del Bóer were established in 1905, simply as Bóer. The club's name is derived from the Boer people of South Africa, who had recently fought a fierce war with the British Empire; the name was thought to represent a spirit of independence and fighting to the death. The Indios' first uniform was white cap, black shirt, white pants and black socks. Bóer was founded by Carter Donaldson, the United States consul in Nicaragua, his son Agustín Donaldson, and Francisco Caparro; Caparro also played for the Indios as pitcher and was the team's first captain.

With the creation of the Nicaraguan Professional Baseball League (LPBN), Indios played the first ever professional baseball game in Nicaragua on 3 March 1956 against Fieras del San Fernando.

The club won three championships in the first era of professional baseball in Nicaragua, that started in 1956 and ended in 1967. The Indios claimed their first championship in the 1962–63 season under manager Tony Castaño, defeating Leones de León in the championship series 2 games to 1. The team participated in the 1963 Interamerican Series as Nicaraguan champions, where they finished as runners-up losing in the final game against Chiriquí-Bocas from Panama. The Indios repeated as champions in the 1964–65 and 1965–66 season, managed by Panamanian Calvin Byron.

Professional baseball was re-established in Nicaragua starting with the 2004–05 season. Indios del Bóer reached the LBPN championship series for the first time in the 2006–07 season, where they swept Leones de León in four games to win their fourth league championship and the first one in the new era of professional baseball in Nicaragua. The team was managed by Noel Areas. The next season, 2007–08, Bóer won the LBPN championship again, defeating the Fieras del San Fernando in the final series 4 games to 0, led by Cuban manager Lourdes Gurriel. Bóer catcher Marlon Abea was awarded as the MVP of the championship series.

The Indios won their third and fourth LBPN championships back to back in 2010–11 and 2011–12. In 2011, they defeated Tigres de Chinandega 4 games to 1, under Noel Arenas, who returned to The Tribe. Infielder Jilton Calderón was awarded the MVP of the championship series. In 2012, in a rematch of the 2011 championship series, the Indios, managed by Julio Sánchez, defeated Chinandega 4 games to 2. Pitcher Diego Sandino was named the MVP of the series.

La Tribu won its fifth LBPN and eight professional title in the 2014–15 season. Under Venezuelan manager Javier Colina, Bóer defeated Gigantes de Rivas 4–2 in the final series of the season. Indios qualified as Nicaraguan champions to the 2015 Latin American Series, held in Panama, where they lost in semifinals against the Leones de Montería from Colombia.

Indios del Bóer won its sixth LBPN and ninth overall championship in the 2022–23 LBPN season, by defeating Gigantes de Rivas 4 games to 2. Bóer pitcher Luis Ramírez was awarded as the Most Valuable Player of the championship series.

== Culture ==
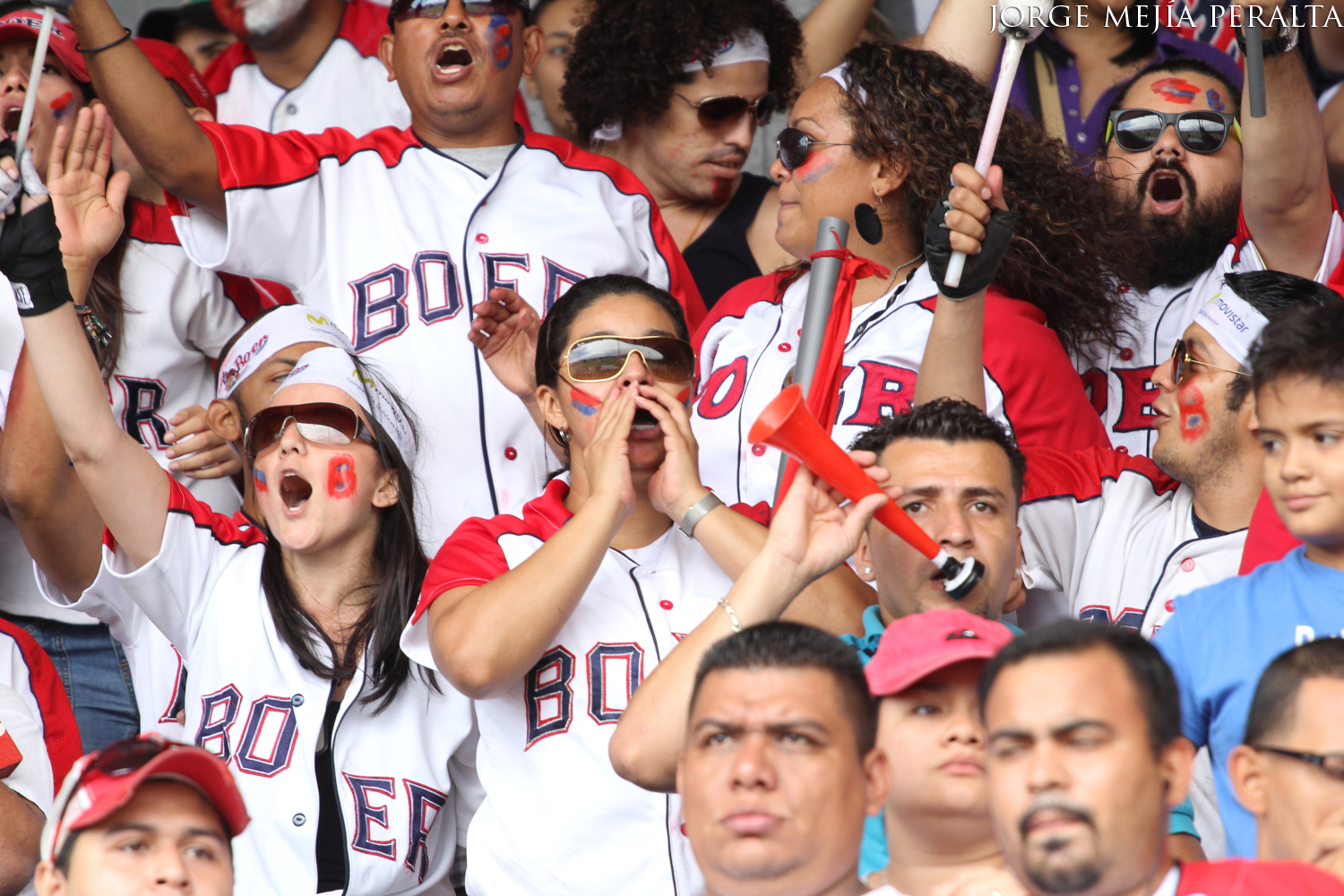
Indios del Bóer supporters, known as boeristas.

Indios del Bóer is considered to be the most popular baseball team in Nicaragua, representing Managua, but with supporters all over the country, known as boeristas. Historically, during the years of the Somoza family dictatorship, the Indios were seen as the people's team; the club was supported by opponents of Somoza rule, and their chief rivals, Cinco Estrellas, were associated with the regime.

The club has had several official songs: Que viva el Bóer (Long live Bóer) by Carlos Mejía Godoy, Viva el Bóer by Los Alegres de Ticuantepe and Siempre Boerista (Boerista forever) by Papucho. Several mottos have been used by the team and its supporters such as: Viva el Bóer, Viva el Bóer aunque pierda (Long live Bóer, even if we lose), Yo soy del Bóer (I am from Bóer) and most recently Viva el Bóer jodido.

The team has previously had the following names: Búfalos del Bóer, Bóer-Victoria and Bóer-Managua.

== Roster ==
Indios del Bóer roster
Players		Coaches
Pitchers: 99 (Nicaragua) Danilo Bermúdez; 10 (Nicaragua) Kenword Burton; 15 (Dominican Republic) Yeudy García; 43 (Nicaragua) Juan Gaytán; 25 (Nicaragua) Alexis Hernández; 54 (Costa Rica) Donovan Holmes; 33 (Netherlands) Kevin Kelly; 37 (Nicaragua) Elder Martínez; 95 (Nicaragua) Lesther Medrano; 32 (United States) Jalen Miller; 13 (Dominican Republic) Willy Paredes; 30 (Nicaragua) Kevin Ramírez; 31 (Nicaragua) Wilder Rayo	Catchers: 29 (Nicaragua) Wiston Dávila; 48 (Nicaragua) Luis González; 27 (Nicaragua) Melvin Novoa; Infielders: 17 (Nicaragua) Jilton Calderón; 8 (Nicaragua) Elmer Espinoza; 7 (Nicaragua) Aldo Espinoza; 26 (Dominican Republic) Manuel Geraldo; 0 (Nicaragua) Marvin Martínez; 9 (Nicaragua) Cristhian Moreno; 18 (Dominican Republic) Oddy Núñez; Outfielders: 3 (Nicaragua) Roger Leyton; 88 (Nicaragua) Edgard Montiel; 14 (Nicaragua) Adrián Moreno; 51 (Nicaragua) Bismarck Rivera	Manager: 4 (Puerto Rico) Joel Fuentes; Coaches: 20 (Nicaragua) Sander Cruz (coach); 12 (Nicaragua) Álvaro López (first base); 59 (Nicaragua) Juan López (coach); 50 (Puerto Rico) Rafael Montalvo (pitching); 16 (Nicaragua) Franklin Sánchez (pitching); 19 (Dominican Republic) Alexander Valdez (coach); Roster updated on 30 January 2024

== Championships ==
Season	Manager	Opponent	Series score
1962–63	Tony Castaño	Leones de León	2–1
1964–65	Calvin Byron		
1965–66	Calvin Byron		
2006–07	Noel Areas	Leones de León	4–0
2007–08	Lourdes Gurriel	Fieras del San Fernando	4–0
2010–11	Noel Areas	Tigres de Chinandega	4–1
2011–12	Julio Sánchez	Tigres de Chinandega	4–2
2014–15	Javier Colina	Gigantes de Rivas	4–2
2022–23	Joel Fuentes	Gigantes de Rivas	4–2
Total championships			9
