= Carlos Teller =

Nicaraguan baseball player (born 1986)

Carlos Téller
- Pitcher
- Born: October 3, 1986 (age 39); Managua, Nicaragua
- Bats: Left Throws: Left
- Stats at Baseball Reference
Medals
Men's baseball
Representing Nicaragua
Central American and Caribbean Games
Silver medal – second place	2014 Veracruz	Team

Carlos José Téller de León (born October 3, 1986) is a Nicaraguan former professional baseball pitcher who is a free agent. He has previously played in the minor leagues, Mexican League, and various winter league teams, most recently the Leones del Escogido of the Dominican Professional Baseball League. He represented the Nicaragua national baseball team at the 2023 and 2026 World Baseball Classic tournaments.

== Professional career ==
=== Pittsburgh Pirates ===
On October 21, 2004, Teller signed with the Pittsburgh Pirates organization as an international free agent. He made his professional debut with the Venezuelan Summer League Pirates, working to a 4.03 earned run average (ERA) in 15 games in 2005. The following year, he posted a 2.86 ERA in the Venezuelan Summer League. Missing the 2007 season due to injury, he posted a 4.37 ERA with the rookie-level Gulf Coast League Pirates in 2008.

=== San Francisco Giants ===
Teller signed with the San Francisco Giants organization on November 28, 2012, after spending four years outside of affiliated baseball. He first appeared with the High-A San Jose Giants on April 17, 2013. After three games, Teller was promoted to the Triple-A Fresno Grizzlies. He pitched to a 1.69 ERA over two games with the Grizzlies, but was demoted to the Double-A Richmond Flying Squirrels. After earning a 5.64 ERA with Richmond, Teller was released by the organization on July 11.

=== Pericos de Puebla ===
Teller signed with the Pericos de Puebla of the Mexican League on February 9, 2015. Despite being born in Nicaragua, Teller's Mexican ancestry allowed him to make up part of Puebla's native player quota, rather than being rostered as a foreign import. In the 2015 LMB season, he worked to a 5.44 ERA in 25 games, 14 of them starts.

=== Olmecas de Tabasco ===
Before the start of the 2016 season, Puebla traded Teller to the Olmecas de Tabasco in exchange for right-fielder Rubén Rivera. With Tabasco, he posted a 4.24 ERA over 20 games. The next year, his ERA worsened to a 6.88, over 18 games.

=== Saraperos de Saltillo ===
On February 23, 2018, Teller signed with the Saraperos de Saltillo of the Mexican League. He made two appearances for Saltillo, but struggled to an 0-1 record and 22.50 ERA with no strikeouts over two innings of work. Teller was released by the Saraperos on April 15.

=== Bravos de León ===
On July 3, 2018, Teller signed with the Bravos de León of the Mexican League. He made 23 appearances (three starts) for the Bravos down the stretch, struggling to an 0-4 record and 10.38 ERA with 13 strikeouts across 21 2/3 innings pitched.

=== Generales de Durango ===
On March 6, 2019, Teller signed with the Generales de Durango of the Mexican League. Teller made 26 appearances (13 starts) for Durango, logging a 4-8 record and 7.65 ERA with 43 strikeouts over 60 innings of work.

=== Rieleros de Aguascalientes ===
On January 11, 2020, Teller signed with the Rieleros de Aguascalientes of the Mexican League. He did not play in a game in 2020 due to the cancellation of the season as a result of the COVID-19 pandemic.

Teller returned to action in 2021, making eight starts for the Rieleros, in which he posted an 0-2 record and 5.13 ERA with 17 strikeouts across 26 1/3 innings of work. Teller announced his retirement on March 26, 2022, but continued to play solely in winter leagues.

=== Hamilton Cardinals ===
On June 9, 2025, Teller came out of retirement and signed with the Hamilton Cardinals of the Intercounty Baseball League. He made one appearance for the team, but took the loss after allowing five earned runs on seven hits over two innings pitched against the Welland Jackfish. Teller was released by the Cardinals on June 13.

== International career ==
Teller plays for the Nicaragua national baseball team. In 2025, he became the first Nicaraguan to participate in four different qualifying tournaments for the World Baseball Classic (2012, 2016, 2022, 2025). At the 2013 WBC qualifiers, he pitched 1.0 scoreless innings, but Nicaragua failed to qualify. At the 2017 WBC qualifiers, he pitched 3.1 innings in two games, allowing 5 earned runs.

Teller pitched at the qualifiers for the 2020 Summer Olympics; he allowed 7 hits, 2 walks, and 3 earned runs in a loss to the United States.

At the 2023 WBC qualifiers, he pitched 1.2 innings of scoreless relief in three games, as Nicaragua earned its first WBC berth in its history. At the 2023 World Baseball Classic, he pitched 2.2 scoreless innings in two appearances for Nicaragua In the game against Israel, Teller induced an inning-ending double play on a bases loaded situation that would have given Israel the lead. However, Nicaragua ultimately lost the game, finishing last in its pool and forcing the team to requalify.
