= Germán Pomares Championship =

Nicaraguan baseball competition

- Sport: Baseball
- Founded: 1970
- No. of teams: 20
- Country: Nicaragua
- Most recent champions: Dantos de Managua (9th title)
- Most titles: Leones de León (13 titles)
- Website: https://beisbolgpo.net/

The Germán Pomares Championship, officially the Campeonato Nacional de Béisbol Superior Cmte. Germán Pomares Ordóñez (lit. "Comdt. Germán Pomares Ordóñez National Senior Baseball Championship") and referred to simply as the Pomares, is a semi-professional baseball circuit in Nicaragua. The league is made up of 20 teams, largely corresponding to the country's different departments. The Pomares is the second-highest level of baseball in the country, below the Nicaraguan Professional Baseball League (LPBN). Several professional baseball teams from the winter league LPBN also compete in the Pomares, which typically runs from February to August.

The competition was formed in 1970 by Carlos García Solórzano, after Nicaragua's professional league collapsed in 1967. It was later renamed after Germán Pomares, a member of the Sandinista National Liberation Front and baseball enthusiast who died during the Nicaraguan Revolution in 1979.

Starting in 2024, the Pomares season is broken into two halves. In the first half, all 20 franchises face each other four times, with the top finishers moving on to a playoffs. The top eight finishers of the first half compete in the second half of the season.

== Teams ==
Team / Department	City	Stadium	Capacity
Indios del Bóer (Managua)	Managua	Estadio Nacional Soberanía	15,000
Brumas de Jinotega	Jinotega	Estadio Moisés Palacios Escorcia	
Cafetaleros de Carazo	Jinotepe	Estadio Pedro Selva	
Cañoneros de Madriz	Somoto	Estadio Santiago	
Pescadores del Caribe Norte	Puerto Cabezas	Estadio Jimmy Webster Palmer	
Caribe Sur	Bluefields	Estadio Glorias Costeñas	4,000
Dantos de Managua	Managua	Estadio Nacional Soberanía	15,000
Defensores de Río San Juan	San Carlos	Estadio Gabriel Aguirre Marín	
Tabacaleros de Estelí	Estelí	Estadio Rufo Marín Bellorin	
Fieras del San Fernando (Masaya)	Masaya	Estadio Roberto Clemente	6,000
Frente Sur de Rivas	Rivas	Estadio Yamil Ríos Ugarte	6,000
Gigantes de Zelaya Central	El Rama	Estadio San Luis	
Indígenas de Matagalpa	Matagalpa	Estadio Chale Solís	
Leones de León	León	Estadio Héroes y Mártires de Septiembre	8,000
Tigres de Chinandega	Chinandega	Estadio Efraín Tijerino	8,000
Guerreros de Nueva Segovia	Ocotal	Estadio Glorias del Deporte	5,000
Productores de Boaco	Boaco	Estadio Ernesto Incer Álvarez	
Tiburones de Granada	Granada	Estadio Roque Tadeo Zavala	6,000
Toros de Chontales	Juigalpa	Estadio Carlos Guerra Colindres	2,000
Mineros del Caribe	Siuna	Estadio Oncelo Martín Jackson	3,000
