= 2026 Serie de las Américas =

2026 baseball tournament

Tournament details
- Country: Venezuela
- Cities: Caracas; Macuto
- Venue(s): Estadio Monumental de Caracas Simón Bolívar; Estadio Fórum La Guaira
- Dates: February 5 – February 13, 2026
- Teams: 7

Final positions
- Champions: (Venezuela) Navegantes del Magallanes (1st title)
- Runners-up: (Colombia) Caimanes de Barranquilla
- Third place: Cuba
- Fourth place: (Panama) Águilas Metropolitanas

Awards
- MVP: (Venezuela) Rougned Odor

The 2026 Serie de las Américas is the second edition of the Serie de las Américas club baseball tournament, which is being played from February 5 to February 13, 2026 at two venues in the Greater Caracas region of Venezuela: Estadio Monumental Simón Bolívar in Caracas and Estadio Fórum La Guaira in Macuto.

The tournament was initially expected to take place in Panama City and La Chorrera from January 24-30. However, it was later reported that the series would be moved to Caracas and La Guaira, Venezuela. Venezuela had been stripped of the hosting rights to the 2026 Caribbean Series due to geopolitical tensions.

The competitors in this tournament are the winners of the winter league baseball leagues of each of the members of the Baseball Association of the Americas: Argentina, Colombia, Cuba, Curaçao, Panama, and Nicaragua. However, Cuba sent its national team to the tournament, rather than the winner of the National Series or Elite League. Panama sent the Águilas Metropolitanas, champions of the 2024-25 Panamanian Professional Baseball League season and the 2025 Serie de las Americas tournament, to this tournament since their 2025–26 winter league baseball season got cancelled.

Venezuela sent the winner of the 2025-26 Venezuelan Professional Baseball League season to this tournament since they decided to pull out of the 2026 Caribbean Series and are the host country for this tournament. Brazil was initially expected to compete as a national team in this tournament as well; however, Brazil was not included in the tournament when the schedule was officially announced.

== Tournament format ==
A single round-robin format is being used, where each team faces each other once. The four teams with the best records will advance to the semifinals. The two losers will meet in the 3rd place match and the two winners will meet in the final to decide the tournament champion.

== Participating teams ==
Team	Manager	Means of qualification
(Argentina) DAOM de Buenos Aires	(Argentina) Dario Martín	Winners of the 2025 Argentine Baseball League
(Colombia) Caimanes de Barranquilla	(Colombia) Néder Horta	Winners of the 2025–26 Colombian Professional Baseball League
Cuba	(Cuba) Germán Mesa	Participating as a national team
(Curaçao) Willemstad Cannons	(Curaçao) Carlos Pineda	Winners of the 2026 Curaçao Professional Baseball League
(Nicaragua) Leones de León	(Nicaragua) Sandor Guido	Winners of the 2025–26 Nicaraguan Professional Baseball League
(Panama) Águilas Metropolitanas	(Panama) Rubén Rivera	Winners of the 2024–25 Panamanian Professional Baseball League
(Venezuela) Navegantes del Magallanes	(Venezuela) César Izturis	Winners of the 2025–26 Venezuelan Professional Baseball League

== Preliminary round ==
Pos	Team	Pld	W	L	RF	RA	RD	PCT	GB	Qualification
1	(Panama) Águilas Metropolitanas	6	5	1	36	29	+7	.833 (Note: Head to head results: Águilas Metropolitanas 8–7 Navegantes del Magallanes)	—	Advance to knockout stage
2	(Venezuela) Navegantes del Magallanes (H)	6	5	1	52	25	+27	.833	—	Advance to knockout stage
3	Cuba	6	3	3	46	39	+7	.500 (Note: Head to head results: Cuba 8–7 Caimanes de Barranquilla)	2	Advance to knockout stage
4	(Colombia) Caimanes de Barranquilla	6	3	3	39	24	+15	.500	2	Advance to knockout stage
5	(Nicaragua) Leones de León	6	2	4	25	30	−5	.333	3	
6	(Argentina) DAOM de Buenos Aires	6	2	4	22	48	−26	.333	3	
7	(Curaçao) Willemstad Cannons	6	1	5	31	56	−25	.167	4	

Updated to match(es) played on February 11, 2026. Source:
Rules for classification: 1) Wins; 2) Head-to-head matches; 3) Team quality balance; 4) Batting average; 5) Drawing of lots.
(H) Hosts
Notes:

Time zone: Time in Venezuela (UTC-4)

Date	Time	Away	Result	Home	Venue	Boxscore
February 5	14:30	DAOM de Buenos Aires (Argentina)	8–7 (F/10)	(Curaçao) Willemstad Cannons	Estadio Monumental	Boxscore
February 5	17:30	Leones de León (Nicaragua)	2–5	(Colombia) Caimanes de Barranquilla	Estadio Fórum La Guaira	Boxscore
February 5	20:00	Águilas Metropolitanas (Panama)	8–7	(Venezuela) Navegantes del Magallanes	Estadio Monumental	Boxscore
February 6	13:30	Cuba	4–5	(Nicaragua) Leones de León	Estadio Monumental	Boxscore
February 6	15:30	Willemstad Cannons (Curaçao)	1–7	(Panama) Águilas Metropolitanas	Estadio Fórum La Guaira	Boxscore
February 6	19:30	DAOM de Buenos Aires (Argentina)	2–7	(Venezuela) Navegantes del Magallanes	Estadio Monumental	Boxscore
February 7	14:30	Caimanes de Barranquilla (Colombia)	2–3	(Panama) Águilas Metropolitanas	Estadio Monumental	Boxscore
February 7	17:30	Willemstad Cannons (Curaçao)	7–3	(Nicaragua) Leones de León	Estadio Fórum La Guaira	Boxscore
February 7	20:30	Cuba	4–8	(Venezuela) Navegantes del Magallanes	Estadio Monumental	Boxscore
February 8	14:30	Caimanes de Barranquilla (Colombia)	12–0 (F/8)	(Curaçao) Willemstad Cannons	Estadio Fórum La Guaira	Boxscore
February 8	17:30	DAOM de Buenos Aires (Argentina)	0–10 (F/8)	Cuba	Estadio Monumental	Boxscore
February 8	20:30	Navegantes del Magallanes (Venezuela)	7–2	(Nicaragua) Leones de León	Estadio Fórum La Guaira	Boxscore
February 9	14:30	Willemstad Cannons (Curaçao)	12–14	Cuba	Estadio Monumental	Boxscore
February 9	17:30	Caimanes de Barranquilla (Colombia)	8–0	(Argentina) DAOM de Buenos Aires	Estadio Fórum La Guaira	Boxscore
February 9	20:30	Leones de León (Nicaragua)	3–5	(Panama) Águilas Metropolitanas	Estadio Monumental	Boxscore
February 10	14:30	Águilas Metropolitanas (Panama)	7–6	Cuba	Estadio Monumental	Boxscore
February 10	17:30	Leones de León (Nicaragua)	10–2	(Argentina) DAOM de Buenos Aires	Estadio Fórum La Guaira	Boxscore
February 10	20:30	Navegantes del Magallanes (Venezuela)	11–5	(Colombia) Caimanes de Barranquilla	Estadio Monumental	Boxscore
February 11	14:30	Águilas Metropolitanas (Panama)	6–10	(Argentina) DAOM de Buenos Aires	Estadio Monumental	Boxscore
February 11	17:30	Cuba	8–7	(Colombia) Caimanes de Barranquilla	Estadio Fórum La Guaira	Boxscore
February 11	20:30	Navegantes del Magallanes (Venezuela)	12–4	(Curaçao) Willemstad Cannons	Estadio Monumental	Boxscore

== Knockout stage ==
Semi-finals
2	(Venezuela) Navegantes del Magallanes	9
3	Cuba	1
1	(Panama) Águilas Metropolitanas	4
4	(Colombia) Caimanes de Barranquilla	6

Final
2	(Venezuela) Navegantes del Magallanes	10
4	(Colombia) Caimanes de Barranquilla	9
Third place play-off
1	(Panama) Águilas Metropolitanas	2
3	Cuba	7

=== Semi-finals ===
Date	Time	Away	Result	Home	Stadium	Boxscore
February 12	12:30	Caimanes de Barranquilla (Colombia)	6–4	(Panama) Águilas Metropolitanas	Estadio Monumental	Boxscore
February 12	19:30	Cuba	1–9	(Venezuela) Navegantes del Magallanes	Estadio Monumental	Boxscore

=== Third place play-off ===
Date	Time	Away	Result	Home	Stadium	Boxscore
February 13	12:30	Cuba	7–2	(Panama) Águilas Metropolitanas	Estadio Fórum La Guaira	Boxscore

=== Final ===
February 13, 2026 19:30 at Estadio Monumental de Caracas Simón Bolívar
Team	1	2	3	4	5	6	7	8	9	R	H	E
(Colombia) Caimanes de Barranquilla	5	1	0	0	3	0	0	0	0	9	17	3
(Venezuela) Navegantes del Magallanes	0	1	0	0	2	0	0	7	X	10	11	4
WP: Silvino Bracho LP: Pedro García Sv: Felipe Rivero; Home runs: Away: None; Home: Rougned Odor, 2 Boxscore

== Statistical leaders ==
As of 12 February 2026

Hitting leaders
Stat	Player	Team	Total
AVG	(Colombia) Harold Ramírez	Caimanes de Barranquilla	.500
AVG	(Cuba) Luis Vicente Mateo	Cuba	.500
HR	(Colombia) Andrés Angulo	Caimanes de Barranquilla	3
HR	(Venezuela) Gabriel Lino	Caimanes de Barranquilla	3
RBI	(Cuba) Yasiel González	Cuba	9
R	(Venezuela) Angel Reyes	Navegantes del Magallanes	10
H	(Curaçao) Hendrik Clementina	Willemstad Cannons	10
H	(Cuba) Luis Vicente Mateo	Cuba	10
SB	(Venezuela) Tucupita Marcano	Navegantes del Magallanes	3
BB	(Venezuela) Hernán Pérez	Navegantes del Magallanes	9

Pitching leaders
Stat	Player	Team	Total
W	(Venezuela) Edwar Colina	Navegantes del Magallanes	2
W	(Panama) Bryan Caceres	Águilas Metropolitanas	2
ERA	23 tied		0.00
K	(United States) Alfredo Villa	Leones de León	11
IP	(Panama) Bryan Caceres	Águilas Metropolitanas	11.2
SV	(Panama) Jorge Bautista	Águilas Metropolitanas	3

== Awards ==
All-Tournament Team
Pos.	Player	Team
SP	(Panama) Bryan Cáceres	(Panama) Águilas Metropolitanas
RP	(Panama) Jorge Bautista	(Panama) Águilas Metropolitanas
C	(Venezuela) Gabriel Lino	(Colombia) Caimanes de Barranquilla
1B	(Venezuela) Aldrem Corredor	(Venezuela) Navegantes del Magallanes
2B	(Cuba) Luis Vicente Mateo	Cuba
3B	(Panama) Gabriel Noriega	(Panama) Águilas Metropolitanas
SS	(Venezuela) Tucupita Marcano	(Venezuela) Navegantes del Magallanes
LF	(Colombia) Harold Ramírez	(Colombia) Caimanes de Barranquilla
CF	(Venezuela) Ángel Reyes	(Venezuela) Navegantes del Magallanes
RF	(Cuba) Yasiel González	Cuba
DH	(Cuba) Alfredo Despaigne	Cuba
Man.	(Panama) Rubén Rivera	(Panama) Águilas Metropolitanas

== See also ==
- 2026 Caribbean Series
