= Serie de las Américas =

Annual baseball tournament

- Sport: Baseball
- First season: 2025
- Organizing body: Baseball Association of the Americas (ABAM)
- Countries: Argentina; Colombia; Cuba; Curaçao; Panama; Nicaragua
- Region: Latin America
- Website: seriedelasamericas.com
- 2026 Serie de las Américas

The Serie de las Américas (English: "Series of the Americas") is an international professional baseball tournament contested by winter league professional baseball teams in Latin America, organized by the Asociación de Béisbol de las Américas (ABAM). Envisioned as an alternative to the Caribbean Series, the first edition took place from January 24 to 30, 2025, in Nicaragua.

In 2026, the tournament gained official recognition from the Caribbean Professional Baseball Confederation (CPBC) as a second-tier competition for winter-league baseball; starting with the 2027 edition, the runner-up of the four CPBC leagues will participate in the tournament along with the ABAM league champions.

== Background ==
The Caribbean Series is the longest-running international club baseball tournament in the Americas, but its participants have generally been limited to members of the Caribbean Professional Baseball Confederation (CPBC), an organization which includes the domestic winter leagues of Venezuela, Puerto Rico, Mexico, and the Dominican Republic. Various alternative competitions have also existed, often incorporating nations that lack or lacked full CPBC membership: namely, the Interamerican Series (1961–64), the Latin American Series (2013–19), and the proposed Intercontinental Series (2024). The CPBC responded by provisionally expanding the Caribbean Series by inviting the league champions from Colombia, Panama, Nicaragua and Curaçao. However, in 2024, the CPBC announced that the 2025 Caribbean Series would drop the new participants, and return to the four full members only (plus a Japanese representative).

On September 20, 2024, representatives of the baseball federations of Argentina, Colombia, Cuba, Curaçao, Panama and Nicaragua announced the formation of the Baseball Association of the Americas (Spanish: Asociación de Béisbol de las Américas, or ABAM). The first Serie de las Américas was held at three locations in Nicaragua, at the Estadio Nacional Soberanía in Managua, the Estadio Roberto Clemente in Masaya, and the Estadio Rigoberto López Pérez in León. Panama and Colombia are slated to host the tournament in 2026 and 2027, respectively.

The 2026 tournament was initially scheduled to be held in Panama City and La Chorrera from January 24-30. However, on December 25, 2025, it was reported that the series would be moved to Caracas and La Guaira, Venezuela, to be played from February 1-7, 2026. Days earlier, Venezuela had been stripped of the hosting rights to the 2026 Caribbean Series due to geopolitical tensions. The new dates would pit the Serie de las Americas directly against the Caribbean Series, which was relocated to Mexico. The series was also threatened by uncertainty surrounding the Probeis season in Panama.

In November 2026, the CBPC signed a cooperation agreement with ABAM to integrate the two competing circuits. As part of the agreement, the runners-up of the four CBPC leagues would participate in the 2027 Serie de las Américas, alongside the league champions of the ABAM countries. The four CBPC league champions will continue to participate in the Caribbean Series.

== Participants ==
| Country | League | First edition |
|---|---|---|
| Argentina | Argentine Baseball League | 2025 |
| Colombia | Colombian Professional Baseball League | 2025 |
| Cuba | Cuban National Series (Note: Cuba sent its national team to the 2026 Serie de las Américas, rather than the winner of the National Series or Elite League.) | 2025 |
| Curaçao | Curaçao Professional Baseball League | 2025 |
| Nicaragua | Nicaraguan Professional Baseball League | 2025 |
| Panama | Panamanian Professional Baseball League | 2025 |

After Venezuela offered to host the 2026 edition, Venezuelan Professional Baseball League (LVBP) announced its participation in the tournament, presumably with players not affiliated with MLB due to the winter league agreement. ABAM president David Salayandia expressed optimism that the LVBP would continue participating in the tournament in future editions.

Additionally, it was reported in 2024 that the baseball federations of Aruba and Honduras have shown interest in participating in the tournament. The 2026 edition of the tournament was initially expected to add Brazil, slated to participate as a national team rather than as a representative of its domestic tournament; however, Brazil was not included when the schedule was officially announced.

== Winners ==
| Year | Final venue | Champion | Result | Runner-up | Winning manager |
|---|---|---|---|---|---|
| 2025 | (Nicaragua) Managua | (Panama) Águilas Metropolitanas | 3–1 | (Nicaragua) Leones de León | (Panama) Sebastián Arroyo |
| 2026 | (Venezuela) Caracas | (Venezuela) Navegantes del Magallanes | 10–9 | (Colombia) Caimanes de Barranquilla | (Venezuela) César Izturis |

== See also ==
- Caribbean Series
- Baseball Champions League Americas
- Latin American Series
- Intercontinental Series
- Interamerican Series
- Copa América (baseball)
