= 2023 Caribbean Series =

Baseball tournament held in Venezuela

Tournament details
- Country: Venezuela
- Cities: La Guaira; Caracas
- Venue(s): La Rinconada Baseball Stadium; Jorge Luis García Carneiro Stadium
- Dates: February 2 – February 10, 2023
- Teams: 8

Final positions
- Champions: (Dominican Republic) Tigres del Licey (11th title)
- Runners-up: (Venezuela) Leones del Caracas
- Third place: (Mexico) Cañeros de Los Mochis
- Fourth place: (Colombia) Vaqueros de Montería

Tournament statistics
- Games played: 32
- Attendance: 247,317 (7,729 per game)

The 2023 Caribbean Series was the 65th edition of the Caribbean Series, played at La Rinconada Baseball Stadium in Caracas and Jorge Luis García Carneiro Stadium in La Guaira, Venezuela from February 2 to February 10, 2023.

The series brought together the champions of each professional baseball league in the countries that make up the Caribbean Professional Baseball Confederation (Venezuela, the Dominican Republic, Puerto Rico, Mexico, Panama and Colombia), plus the representatives of Curaçao and Cuba as guests.

== Stadium ==
La Rinconada Baseball Stadium and Jorge Luis García Carneiro Stadium in Caracas were the hosts of the round robin matches and the semi-finals and La Rinconada hosted the finals and third place game. La Rinconada stadium was opened for the first time and it is the largest baseball stadium in South America with a capacity of 40,000.

== Tournament format ==
A single round-robin format was used; each team faced each other once. The four teams with the best records advanced to the semifinals (1st vs. 4th and 2nd vs. 3rd). The two losers met in the 3rd place match and the two winners met in the final to decide the tournament champion.

== Participating teams ==
Team	Manager	Means of qualification
(Colombia) Vaqueros de Montería	(Colombia) Ronald Ramírez	Winners of the 2022–23 Colombian Professional Baseball League
(Mexico) Cañeros de Los Mochis	(Venezuela) José Moreno	Winners of the 2022–23 Mexican Pacific League
(Panama) Federales de Chiriquí	(Panama) José Mayorga	Winners of the 2022–23 Panamanian Professional Baseball League
(Puerto Rico) Indios de Mayagüez	(Puerto Rico) Mako Oliveras	Winners of the 2022–23 Puerto Rican Professional Baseball League
(Dominican Republic) Tigres del Licey	(Dominican Republic) José Offerman	Winners of the 2022–23 Dominican Professional Baseball League
(Venezuela) Leones del Caracas	(Venezuela) José Alguacil	Winners of the 2022–23 Venezuelan Professional Baseball League
(Cuba) Agricultores (Las Tunas/Granma)	(Cuba) Carlos Martí	Winners of the 2022–23 Cuban Elite League
(Curaçao) WildCats KJ74	(Curaçao) Hainley Statia	Winners of the 2022 Curaçao National Championship AA League

== Preliminary round ==
Pos	Team	Pld	W	L	RF	RA	RD	PCT	GB	Qualification
1	(Mexico) Cañeros de Los Mochis	7	5	2	31	27	+4	.714 (Note: Head-to-head: Cañeros 1-0; Leones 0-1)	—	Advance to knockout stage
2	(Venezuela) Leones del Caracas (H)	7	5	2	44	30	+14	.714	—	Advance to knockout stage
3	(Colombia) Vaqueros de Montería	7	4	3	44	31	+13	.571 (Note: Head-to-head: Vaqueros 2-0; Tigres 1-1; Indios 0-2)	1	Advance to knockout stage
4	(Dominican Republic) Tigres del Licey	7	4	3	32	27	+5	.571	1	Advance to knockout stage
5	(Puerto Rico) Indios de Mayagüez	7	4	3	29	24	+5	.571	1	
6	(Panama) Federales de Chiriquí	7	3	4	23	29	−6	.429	2	
7	(Curaçao) WildCats KJ74	7	2	5	18	27	−9	.286	3	
8	(Cuba) Agricultores	7	1	6	23	49	−26	.143	4	

Rules for classification: 1) Wins; 2) Head-to-head matches; 3) Team quality balance; 4) Batting average; 5) Drawing of lots.
(H) Hosts
Notes:

Time zone: Time in Venezuela (UTC–4)

Date	Time	Away	Result	Home	Stadium
February 2	10:30	Agricultores (Cuba)	3−1 (10)	(Curaçao) WildCats KJ74	Jorge Luis García Carneiro Stadium
February 2	12:00	Cañeros de Los Mochis (Mexico)	5−4	(Dominican Republic) Tigres del Licey	La Rinconada Baseball Stadium
February 2	15:00	Vaqueros de Montería (Colombia)	7−1	(Puerto Rico) Indios de Mayagüez	Jorge Luis García Carneiro Stadium
February 2	20:30	Leones del Caracas (Venezuela)	5−2	(Panama) Federales de Chiriquí	La Rinconada Baseball Stadium
February 3	13:00	Federales de Chiriquí (Panama)	6−5	(Colombia) Vaqueros de Montería	La Rinconada Baseball Stadium
February 3	14:30	Tigres del Licey (Dominican Republic)	3−1	(Cuba) Agricultores	Jorge Luis García Carneiro Stadium
February 3	18:00	WildCats KJ74 (Curaçao)	2−1	(Mexico) Cañeros de Los Mochis	La Rinconada Baseball Stadium
February 3	19:30	Indios de Mayagüez (Puerto Rico)	6−1	(Venezuela) Leones del Caracas	Jorge Luis García Carneiro Stadium
February 4	10:30	WildCats KJ74 (Curaçao)	1−0	(Panama) Federales de Chiriquí	La Rinconada Baseball Stadium
February 4	14:00	Indios de Mayagüez (Puerto Rico)	4−6	(Dominican Republic) Tigres del Licey	Jorge Luis García Carneiro Stadium
February 4	15:00	Vaqueros de Montería (Colombia)	6−7	(Mexico) Cañeros de Los Mochis	La Rinconada Baseball Stadium
February 4	19:30	Agricultores (Cuba)	3−20	(Venezuela) Leones del Caracas	La Rinconada Baseball Stadium
February 5	13:00	Vaqueros de Montería (Colombia)	6−5 (13)	(Curaçao) WildCats KJ74	Jorge Luis García Carneiro Stadium
February 5	14:30	Cañeros de Los Mochis (Mexico)	6−5	(Cuba) Agricultores	La Rinconada Baseball Stadium
February 5	18:00	Indios de Mayagüez (Puerto Rico)	2−3	(Panama) Federales de Chiriquí	Jorge Luis García Carneiro Stadium
February 5	19:30	Tigres del Licey (Dominican Republic)	2−3 (12)	(Venezuela) Leones del Caracas	La Rinconada Baseball Stadium
February 6	10:30	Agricultores (Cuba)	4−5	(Colombia) Vaqueros de Montería	La Rinconada Baseball Stadium
February 6	14:00	Tigres del Licey (Dominican Republic)	10−1	(Panama) Federales de Chiriquí	Jorge Luis García Carneiro Stadium
February 6	15:00	WildCats KJ74 (Curaçao)	1−3	(Puerto Rico) Indios de Mayagüez	La Rinconada Baseball Stadium
February 6	19:30	Cañeros de Los Mochis (Mexico)	7−0	(Venezuela) Leones del Caracas	La Rinconada Baseball Stadium
February 7	13:00	Agricultores (Cuba)	3−4	(Puerto Rico) Indios de Mayagüez	La Rinconada Baseball Stadium
February 7	14:30	Federales de Chiriquí (Panama)	1−2	(Mexico) Cañeros de Los Mochis	Jorge Luis García Carneiro Stadium
February 7	18:00	Vaqueros de Montería (Colombia)	11−1	(Dominican Republic) Tigres del Licey	La Rinconada Baseball Stadium
February 7	19:30	Leones del Caracas (Venezuela)	8−6	(Curaçao) WildCats KJ74	Jorge Luis García Carneiro Stadium
February 8	10:30	Federales de Chiriquí (Panama)	10–4	(Cuba) Agricultores	La Rinconada Baseball Stadium
February 8	14:00	WildCats KJ74 (Curaçao)	2–6	(Dominican Republic) Tigres del Licey	Jorge Luis García Carneiro Stadium
February 8	15:00	Indios de Mayagüez (Puerto Rico)	9–3	(Mexico) Cañeros de Los Mochis	La Rinconada Baseball Stadium
February 8	19:30	Leones del Caracas (Venezuela)	7–4	(Colombia) Vaqueros de Montería	La Rinconada Baseball Stadium

== Knockout stage ==
Semi-finals
1	(Mexico) Cañeros de Los Mochis	3
4	(Dominican Republic) Tigres del Licey	8
2	(Venezuela) Leones del Caracas	7
3	(Colombia) Vaqueros de Montería	5

Final
4	(Dominican Republic) Tigres del Licey	3
2	(Venezuela) Leones del Caracas	0
Third place play-off
1	(Mexico) Cañeros de Los Mochis	1
3	(Colombia) Vaqueros de Montería	0

=== Semi-finals ===
Date	Time	Away	Result	Home	Stadium
February 9	15:30	Tigres del Licey (Dominican Republic)	8–3	(Mexico) Cañeros de Los Mochis	Jorge Luis García Carneiro Stadium
February 9	19:30	Vaqueros de Montería (Colombia)	5–7	(Venezuela) Leones del Caracas	La Rinconada Baseball Stadium

=== Third place play-off ===
Date	Time	Away	Result	Home	Stadium
February 10	14:30	Vaqueros de Montería (Colombia)	0–1	(Mexico) Cañeros de Los Mochis	La Rinconada Baseball Stadium

=== Final ===
February 10, 2023 19:30 at La Rinconada Baseball Stadium in Caracas, Venezuela
Team	1	2	3	4	5	6	7	8	9	R	H	E
(Dominican Republic) Tigres del Licey	0	1	0	0	1	0	0	0	1	3	9	0
(Venezuela) Leones del Caracas	0	0	0	0	0	0	0	0	0	0	3	2
WP: Cesar Valdez (1–0) LP: Erick Alejandro Leal (0–1)

== Awards ==
All-Tournament Team
Position	Player
Starting Pitcher	(Colombia) Eduar López
Relief Pitcher	(Venezuela) Anthony Vizcaya
Catcher	(Mexico) José Félix
First Baseman	(Mexico) Reynaldo Rodríguez
Second Baseman	(Colombia) Francisco Acuña
Third Baseman	(Puerto Rico) Emmanuel Rivera
Shortstop	(Colombia) Dayan Frías
Outfielders	(Dominican Republic) Emilio Bonifácio (Colombia) Gustavo Campero (Venezuela) Danry Vásquez
Designated Hitter	(Colombia) Jordan Díaz
Manager	(Mexico) José Moreno
