= 2026 U-23 Baseball World Cup =

Tournament details
- Country: Nicaragua
- Cities: Managua, Masaya & León
- Dates: November 6 - 15
- Teams: 12

Final positions
- Champions: Venezuela (2nd title)
- Runners-up: Australia
- Third place: Japan
- Fourth place: Chinese Taipei

Tournament statistics
- Games played: 50
- Attendance: 31,893 (638 per game)

Awards
- MVP: (Venezuela) Andry Lara

The 2026 WBSC U-23 Baseball World Cup is the 6th edition of the U-23 Baseball World Cup, contested by the under-23 national teams of the member associations of WBSC. It took place in Nicaragua from 6–15 November 2026. The competition was held in three Nicaraguan cities, Managua, León and Masaya.

== Host selection ==
WBSC announced Nicaragua as the tournament host on 29 July 2025.

== Format ==
The tournament will be conducted according to the following format.

First round: The 12 participating nations were drawn into two groups of six teams, in which single round robin will occur. The top three teams from each group advances to the Super Round, while the bottom 3 nations from each group advance to the consolation round.

Placement round: The six nations in this round play one game against the teams they have not played yet. (example: The 4th placed team from Group A will play the bottom three teams from Group B)

Super round: The format in the super round is similar to that of the consolation round. Each team plays the top three teams from the opposing group. (example: The first place team from Group B will play the top three teams from Group A) The standings for this round will include the two games played against the two other second-round qualifiers from the team's first-round group, and the three games played in the second round, for a total of five games. The third and fourth-place finishers advance to the bronze-medal game, and the first and second-place finishers advance to the gold-medal game.

Finals: The Finals consist of the Bronze Medal Game, contested by the third and fourth-place finishers, and the gold-medal game, contested by the first and second-place finishers.

== Qualification ==
Event		Dates	Location(s)	Berth(s)	Qualified
Host nation		—N/a	—N/a	1	Nicaragua
2025 U-23 European Championship		5–9 August 2025	(Czech Republic) Brno-Komín/Třebíč	2	Great Britain; Czech Republic
2025 Asian Championship		22–29 September 2025	(China) Pingtan	3	Japan; Chinese Taipei; South Korea
2025 U-23 Pan American Championship	Caribbean, Central and North America	28 September – 4 October 2025	La Chorrera/Panama City	4	Panama; Puerto Rico; Cuba
2025 U-23 Pan American Championship	South America	20–25 October 2025	(Peru) Lima	4	Venezuela
2025 U-23 African Championship		30 October – 2 November 2025	(South Africa) Boksburg	1	South Africa
2025 U-23 Oceania Championship		6–9 November 2025	(Australia) Sydney	1	Australia

== Officials, Scorers, Technical Commissions ==
13 umpires, 6 scorers and 6 technical commissions were selected by the WBSC tournament.

Umpires
Confederation	Umpires
WBSC Americas	Luis Cesar Valdez Magrans (Cuba)
WBSC Americas	Edward Pinales (Dominican Republic)
WBSC Americas	Jair Fernandez (Mexico)
WBSC Americas	Alfonso Silva (Nicaragua)
WBSC Americas	Jairo Mendoza (Nicaragua)
WBSC Americas	Eric Bosquez Rodriguez (Panama)
WBSC Americas	Kevin Bultron (Puerto Rico)
WBSC Americas	Ruben Ramos (Puerto Rico)
WBSC Americas	Angel Campos (United States)
WBSC Americas	Jeffrey Alan Spisak (United States)
WBSC Europe	Edoardo Ruffo (Italy)
WBSC Europe	Mojmír Jankovič (Slovakia)
WBSC Europe	Michael Ulloa (Spain)

Scorers
Confederation	Scorers
WBSC Americas	Mathías Ochoa (Argentina)
WBSC Americas	Gabriel Almaraz (Mexico)
WBSC Americas	Luis Matsuo (Mexico)
WBSC Americas	Gian Paoloarquistain (Nicaragua)
WBSC Americas	Juan Cubillo (Nicaragua)
WBSC Americas	Rafael Mojica (Nicaragua)

Technical Commissions
Confederation	Technical Commissions
WBSC Americas	Carlos Campos (Nicaragua)
WBSC Americas	Karina del Socorro Reyes Mendez (Nicaragua)
WBSC Americas	Frank Marcos (United States)
WBSC Americas	Rick Dell (United States)
WBSC Europe	Lucio Taschin (Italy)
WBSC Europe	Luis Camarago (Italy)

== Teams ==
The following 12 teams qualified for the tournament.

Group A	Group B
Australia	Cuba
Czech Republic	Great Britain
Nicaragua	Japan
Panama	South Korea
Puerto Rico	South Africa
Chinese Taipei	Venezuela

== First round ==
=== Group A ===
Pos	Team	Pld	W	L	RF	RA	PCT	GB	Qualification
1	Australia	5	4	1	32	13	.800	—	Advance to super round
2	Puerto Rico	5	3	2	15	13	.600	1	Advance to super round
3	Chinese Taipei	5	2	3	10	12	.400	2	Advance to super round
4	Panama	5	2	3	20	18	.400	2	Advance to placement round
5	Czech Republic	5	2	3	18	34	.400	2	Advance to placement round
6	Nicaragua (H)	5	2	3	10	15	.400	2	Advance to placement round

Source: WBSC
(H) Hosts

Date	Local time	Road team	Score	Home team	Inn.	Venue	Game duration	Attendance	Boxscore
Nov 6, 2026	12:00	Czech Republic	2–5	Chinese Taipei	7	Estadio Roberto Clemente	1:50	87	Boxscore
Nov 6, 2026	14:30	Panama	1–2	Puerto Rico	7	Estadio Nacional Soberanía	2:11	123	Boxscore
Nov 6, 2026	19:30	Nicaragua	0–3	Australia	7	Estadio Nacional Soberanía	2:00	4,625	Boxscore
Nov 7, 2026	10:30	Panama	11–3	Czech Republic	7	Estadio Nacional Soberanía	2:47	31	Boxscore
Nov 7, 2026	12:00	Puerto Rico	1–9	Australia	7	Estadio Roberto Clemente	2:13	37	Boxscore
Nov 7, 2026	18:00	Nicaragua	4–2	Chinese Taipei	7	Estadio Rigoberto López Pérez	3:02	2,711	Boxscore
Nov 8, 2026	10:30	Australia	6–9	Czech Republic	7	Estadio Nacional Soberanía	2:38	79	Boxscore
Nov 8, 2026	14:30	Chinese Taipei	3–1	Panama	7	Estadio Nacional Soberanía	2:27	131	Boxscore
Nov 8, 2026	18:30	Puerto Rico	2–3	Nicaragua	7	Estadio Nacional Soberanía	2:26	4,402	Boxscore
Nov 9, 2026	10:30	Australia	4–0	Chinese Taipei	7	Estadio Nacional Soberanía	2:31	58	Boxscore
Nov 9, 2026	18:00	Czech Republic	0–9	Puerto Rico	7	Estadio Rigoberto López Pérez	1:55	61	Boxscore
Nov 9, 2026	18:30	Nicaragua	0–4	Panama	7	Estadio Roberto Clemente	2:04	3,764	Boxscore
Nov 10, 2026	14:30	Chinese Taipei	0–1	Puerto Rico	7	Estadio Nacional Soberanía	2:15	76	Boxscore
Nov 10, 2026	18:00	Australia	10–3	Panama	7	Estadio Rigoberto López Pérez	2:43	155	Boxscore
Nov 10, 2026	18:30	Czech Republic	4–3	Nicaragua	7	Estadio Nacional Soberanía	2:45	1,976	Boxscore

=== Group B ===
Pos	Team	Pld	W	L	RF	RA	PCT	GB	Qualification
1	Venezuela	5	5	0	44	1	1.000	—	Advance to super round
2	Japan	5	4	1	34	17	.800	1	Advance to super round
3	South Korea	5	3	2	18	15	.600	2	Advance to super round
4	Great Britain	5	2	3	15	25	.400	3	Advance to placement round
5	Cuba	5	1	4	33	30	.200	4	Advance to placement round
6	South Africa	5	0	5	9	65	.000	5	Advance to placement round

Source: WBSC

Date	Local time	Road team	Score	Home team	Inn.	Venue	Game duration	Attendance	Boxscore
Nov 6, 2026	10:30	South Africa	0–10	Venezuela	5	Estadio Nacional Soberanía		72	Boxscore
Nov 6, 2026	18:00	Cuba	2–3	South Korea	8	Estadio Rigoberto López Pérez	3:03	350	Boxscore
Nov 6, 2026	18:30	Great Britain	4–5	Japan	9	Estadio Roberto Clemente	3:11	627	Boxscore
Nov 7, 2026	14:30	Cuba	26–6	South Africa	6	Estadio Nacional Soberanía	3:10	55	Boxscore
Nov 7, 2026	18:30	Venezuela	10–0	Great Britain	5	Estadio Roberto Clemente	2:09	532	Boxscore
Nov 7, 2026	18:30	South Korea	5–6	Japan	8	Estadio Nacional Soberanía	3:25	870	Boxscore
Nov 8, 2026	12:00	Japan	5–1	Cuba	7	Estadio Roberto Clemente	1:59	79	Boxscore
Nov 8, 2026	18:00	South Africa	3–5	Great Britain	5	Estadio Rigoberto López Pérez	2:03	53	Boxscore
Nov 8, 2026	18:30	South Korea	0–7	Venezuela	7	Estadio Roberto Clemente	2:03	890	Boxscore
Nov 9, 2026	12:00	Cuba	0–10	Venezuela	5	Estadio Roberto Clemente	1:32	86	Boxscore
Nov 9, 2026	14:30	Great Britain	0–3	South Korea	7	Estadio Nacional Soberanía	2:12	135	Boxscore
Nov 9, 2026	18:30	Japan	17–0	South Africa	5	Estadio Nacional Soberanía	1:58	147	Boxscore
Nov 10, 2026	10:30	Great Britain	6–4	Cuba	8	Estadio Nacional Soberanía	3:18	25	Boxscore
Nov 10, 2026	12:00	Venezuela	7–1	Japan	7	Estadio Roberto Clemente	1:59	91	Boxscore
Nov 10, 2026	18:30	South Africa	0–7	South Korea	7	Estadio Roberto Clemente	2:08	975	Boxscore

== Super round ==
Pos	Team	Pld	W	L	RF	RA	PCT	GB	Qualification
1	Venezuela	5	4	1	29	24	.800	—	Advance to final
2	Australia	5	3	2	23	14	.600	1	Advance to final
3	Japan	5	3	2	24	18	.600	1	Advance to third-place game
4	Chinese Taipei	5	3	2	21	8	.600	1	Advance to third-place game
5	Puerto Rico	5	2	3	16	33	.400	2	
6	South Korea	5	0	5	13	29	.000	4	

Source: WBSC

Date	Local time	Road team	Score	Home team	Inn.	Venue	Game duration	Attendance	Boxscore
Nov 12, 2026	10:30	Puerto Rico	1–11	Japan	5	Estadio Nacional Soberanía	2:04	26	Boxscore
Nov 12, 2026	14:30	Venezuela	6–3	Australia	7	Estadio Nacional Soberanía	2:24	76	Boxscore
Nov 12, 2026	18:30	South Korea	1–6	Chinese Taipei	7	Estadio Nacional Soberanía	2:10	132	Boxscore
Nov 13, 2026	10:30	Puerto Rico	7–8	Venezuela	8	Estadio Nacional Soberanía	3:10	64	Boxscore
Nov 13, 2026	18:30	Chinese Taipei	2–1	Japan	7	Estadio Roberto Clemente	1:37	284	Boxscore
Nov 13, 2026	18:30	South Korea	2–4	Australia	7	Estadio Nacional Soberanía	2:21	165	Boxscore
Nov 14, 2026	12:00	South Korea	5–6	Puerto Rico	8	Estadio Roberto Clemente	2:55	122	Boxscore
Nov 14, 2026	18:30	Japan	5–3	Australia	7	Estadio Roberto Clemente	2:28	53	Boxscore
Nov 14, 2026	18:30	Chinese Taipei	13–1	Venezuela	7	Estadio Nacional Soberanía	2:36	232	Boxscore

== Placement round ==
Pos	Team	Pld	W	L	RF	RA	PCT	GB
1	Cuba	5	4	1	60	16	.800	—
2	Great Britain	5	3	2	26	20	.600	1
3	Panama	5	3	2	32	25	.600	1
4	Czech Republic	5	3	2	22	41	.600	1
5	Nicaragua	5	2	3	16	15	.400	2
6	South Africa	5	0	5	20	59	.000	4

Source: WBSC

Date	Local time	Road team	Score	Home team	Inn.	Venue	Game duration	Attendance	Boxscore
Nov 12, 2026	12:00	Panama	7–11	Great Britain	7	Estadio Roberto Clemente	3:33	22	Boxscore
Nov 12, 2026	18:00	Cuba	16–2	Czech Republic	5	Estadio Rigoberto López Pérez	2:13	83	Boxscore
Nov 12, 2026	18:30	South Africa	1–11	Nicaragua	5	Estadio Roberto Clemente	2:06		Boxscore
Nov 13, 2026	12:00	Cuba	8–1	Panama	7	Estadio Roberto Clemente	2:24	53	Boxscore
Nov 13, 2026	14:30	South Africa	7–8	Czech Republic	7	Estadio Nacional Soberanía	2:50	36	Boxscore
Nov 13, 2026	18:00	Nicaragua	1–0	Great Britain	7	Estadio Rigoberto López Pérez	2:23	170	Boxscore
Nov 14, 2026	10:30	South Africa	3–9	Panama	7	Estadio Nacional Soberanía	2:12	27	Boxscore
Nov 14, 2026	14:30	Nicaragua	1–6	Cuba	7	Estadio Nacional Soberanía	2:29	2,799	Boxscore
Nov 14, 2026	18:00	Czech Republic	5–4	Great Britain	7	Estadio Rigoberto López Pérez	2:39	17	Boxscore

== Finals ==
=== Third-place game ===
Date	Local time	Road team	Score	Home team	Inn.	Venue	Game duration	Attendance	Boxscore
Nov 15, 2026	12:00	Chinese Taipei	4 – 8	Japan	7	Estadio Nacional Soberanía	2:41	50	Boxscore

=== Final ===
Date	Local time	Road team	Score	Home team	Inn.	Venue	Game duration	Attendance	Boxscore
Nov 15, 2026	18:00	Australia	0 – 5	Venezuela	7	Estadio Nacional Soberanía	2:01	4,301	Boxscore

== Final standings ==
Rk	Team	W	L
1st place, gold medalist(s)	Venezuela	8	1
Lost in final
2nd place, silver medalist(s)	Australia	5	4
Failed to qualify for the final
3rd place, bronze medalist(s)	Japan	7	2
Lost in 3rd place game
4	Chinese Taipei	5	4
Failed to qualify for the finals
5	Puerto Rico	4	4
6	South Korea	3	5
Failed to qualify for the super round
7	Cuba	4	4
8	Great Britain	3	5
9	Panama	3	5
10	Czech Republic	4	4
11	Nicaragua	4	4
12	South Africa	0	8
