= Jesús Vargas =

Jesús Vargas may refer to:

- Jessie Vargas, American boxer
- Jesús Vargas (footballer), Venezuelan footballer
- Jesus Vargas (general), Philippine Army general and politician
- Jesús Vargas (baseball), Venezuelan baseball player
