= 2025 Serie de las Américas =

2025 baseball tournament

Tournament details
- Country: Nicaragua
- Cities: Managua; Masaya; León
- Venue(s): Estadio Nacional Soberanía; Estadio Roberto Clemente; Estadio Rigoberto López Pérez
- Dates: January 24 – January 30, 2025
- Teams: 6

Final positions
- Champions: (Panama) Águilas Metropolitanas (1st title)
- Runners-up: (Nicaragua) Leones de León

Awards
- MVP: (Nicaragua) Emanuel Trujillo

The 2025 Serie de las Américas was the inaugural edition of the Serie de las Américas club baseball tournament and it took place from January 24 to 30, 2025, in Nicaragua, at the Estadio Nacional Soberanía in Managua, the Estadio Roberto Clemente in Masaya, and the Estadio Rigoberto López Pérez in León.

The competitors in this series were the winners of the winter league baseball leagues of each of the members of the Baseball Association of the Americas: Argentina, Colombia, Cuba, Curaçao, Panama, and Nicaragua.

== Tournament format ==
A single round-robin format was used, where each team faced each other once. The four teams with the best records advanced to the semifinals. The two semifinal winners then met in the final to decide the tournament champion.

== Participating teams ==
Team	Manager	Means of qualification
(Argentina) Club DAOM	(Argentina) Fabricio Curtti	Winners of the 2024 Argentine Baseball League
(Colombia) Caimanes de Barranquilla	(Colombia) Normando Linero	Winners of the 2024–25 Colombian Professional Baseball League
(Cuba) Leñadores de Las Tunas	(Cuba) Abeysi Pantoja	Winners of the 2024 Cuban National Series
Curaçao Goats	(Curaçao) Hainley Statia	Winners of the 2024 Curaçao Professional Baseball League
(Nicaragua) Leones de León	(Nicaragua) Sandor Guido	Winners of the 2024–25 Nicaraguan Professional Baseball League
(Panama) Águilas Metropolitanas	(Panama) Sebastian Arroyo	Winners of the 2024–25 Panamanian Professional Baseball League

== Preliminary round ==
Pos	Team	Pld	W	L	RF	RA	RD	PCT	GB	Qualification
1	Curaçao Goats	5	5	0	46	16	+30	1.000	—	Advance to knockout stage
2	(Nicaragua) Leones de León (H)	5	4	1	36	13	+23	.800	1	Advance to knockout stage
3	(Cuba) Leñadores de Las Tunas	5	2	3	27	41	−14	.400 (Note: Head-to-head: Leñadores 1-0; Águilas 0-1)	3	Advance to knockout stage
4	(Panama) Águilas Metropolitanas	5	2	3	40	31	+9	.400	3	Advance to knockout stage
5	(Argentina) Club DAOM	5	1	4	15	63	−48	.200 (Note: Head-to-head: Club DAOM 1-0; Caimanes 0-1)	4	
6	(Colombia) Caimanes de Barranquilla	5	1	4	22	22	0	.200	4	

Rules for classification: 1) Wins; 2) Head-to-head matches; 3) Team quality balance; 4) Batting average; 5) Drawing of lots.
(H) Hosts
Notes:

Time zone: Time in Nicaragua (UTC-6)

Date	Time	Away	Result	Home	Stadium
January 24	14:00	Águilas Metropolitanas (Panama)	19–1 (8)	(Argentina) Club DAOM	Estadio Nacional Soberanía, Managua
January 24	19:00	Leñadores de Las Tunas (Cuba)	1–5	(Nicaragua) Leones de León	Estadio Nacional Soberanía, Managua
January 25	10:00	Caimanes de Barranquilla (Colombia)	4–5 (7)	Curaçao Goats	Estadio Nacional Soberanía, Managua
January 25	14:00	Club DAOM (Argentina)	5–1	(Colombia) Caimanes de Barranquilla	Estadio Nacional Soberanía, Managua
January 25	18:00	Águilas Metropolitanas (Panama)	4–5	(Cuba) Leñadores de Las Tunas	Estadio Roberto Clemente, Masaya
January 25	19:00	Curaçao Goats	3–0	(Nicaragua) Leones de León	Estadio Nacional Soberanía, Managua
January 26	14:00	Caimanes de Barranquilla (Colombia)	3–4	(Panama) Águilas Metropolitanas	Estadio Nacional Soberanía, Managua
January 26	18:00	Leones de León (Nicaragua)	13–2 (7)	(Argentina) Club DAOM	Estadio Rigoberto López Pérez, León
January 26	19:00	Leñadores de Las Tunas (Cuba)	2–15 (7)	Curaçao Goats	Estadio Nacional Soberanía, Managua
January 27	14:00	Club DAOM (Argentina)	2–12 (7)	Curaçao Goats	Estadio Nacional Soberanía, Managua
January 27	18:00	Águilas Metropolitanas (Panama)	5–11	(Nicaragua) Leones de León	Estadio Roberto Clemente, Masaya
January 27	19:00	Caimanes de Barranquilla (Colombia)	12–1 (7)	(Cuba) Leñadores de Las Tunas	Estadio Nacional Soberanía, Managua
January 28	14:00	Leñadores de Las Tunas (Cuba)	18–5	(Argentina) Club DAOM	Estadio Nacional Soberanía, Managua
January 28	18:00	Leones de León (Nicaragua)	7–2	(Colombia) Caimanes de Barranquilla	Estadio Rigoberto López Pérez, León
January 28	19:00	Curaçao Goats	11–8	(Panama) Águilas Metropolitanas	Estadio Nacional Soberanía, Managua

== Knockout stage ==
Semi-finals
1	Curaçao Goats	0
4	(Panama) Águilas Metropolitanas	7
2	(Nicaragua) Leones de León	5
3	(Cuba) Leñadores de Las Tunas	4

Final
4	(Panama) Águilas Metropolitanas	3
2	(Nicaragua) Leones de León	1

=== Semi-finals ===
Date	Time	Away	Result	Home	Stadium
January 29	18:00	Águilas Metropolitanas (Panama)	7–0	Curaçao Goats	Estadio Nacional Soberanía, Managua
January 29	18:00	Leñadores de Las Tunas (Cuba)	4–5	(Nicaragua) Leones de León	Estadio Roberto Clemente, Masaya

=== Final ===
January 30, 2025 18:00 at Estadio Nacional Soberanía in Managua, Nicaragua
Team	1	2	3	4	5	6	7	8	9	R	H	E
(Panama) Águilas Metropolitanas	1	0	0	2	0	0	0	0	0	3	12	0
(Nicaragua) Leones de León	0	0	1	0	0	0	0	0	0	1	5	1
Boxscore

== Statistical leaders ==
=== Batting ===
Stat	Name	Team	Total
AVG	(Curaçao) Ray-Patrick Didder	Curaçao Goats	.563
HR	(Nicaragua) Emanuel Trujillo	(Nicaragua) Leones de León	3
RBI	(Nicaragua) Emanuel Trujillo	(Nicaragua) Leones de León	9
RBI	(Curaçao) Raysheandell Michel	Curaçao Goats	9
H	(Panama) Austin Dennis	(Panama) Águilas Metropolitanas	10
H	(Cuba) Yuniesky Larduet	(Cuba) Leñadores de Las Tunas	10
R	(Curaçao) Darren Seferina	Curaçao Goats	8
SB	(United States) Chase Dawson	(Nicaragua) Leones de León	4

=== Pitching ===
Stat	Name	Team	Total
W	(Cuba) Andy Vargas	(Cuba) Leñadores de Las Tunas	2
L	5 tied with		1
SO	(Cuba) Andy Vargas	(Cuba) Leñadores de Las Tunas	10
IP	(Venezuela) Luis Eloy Gonzalez	(Argentina) Club DAOM	7.2
ERA	3 tied with		0.00

== See also ==
- 2025 Caribbean Series
- 2025 Baseball Champions League Americas
