= 2025 Caribbean Series =

2025 baseball tournament

Tournament details
- Country: Mexico
- City: Mexicali
- Venue: Estadio Nido de los Águilas
- Dates: January 31 – February 7, 2025
- Teams: 5

Final positions
- Champions: (Dominican Republic) Leones del Escogido (5th title)
- Runners-up: (Mexico) Charros de Jalisco
- Third place: (Puerto Rico) Indios de Mayagüez
- Fourth place: (Venezuela) Cardenales de Lara

Tournament statistics
- Games played: 14
- Attendance: 201,119 (14,366 per game)

Awards
- MVP: (Dominican Republic) Esmil Rogers (Leones del Escogido)

The 2025 Caribbean Series was the 67th edition of the Caribbean Series club baseball tournament, scheduled from January 31 to February 7, 2025, at Estadio Nido de los Águilas in Mexicali, Baja California, Mexico.

The series featured the winners of the respective winter league baseball leagues of the Caribbean Professional Baseball Confederation (CPBC): the four full members (Dominican Republic, Mexico, Puerto Rico and Venezuela), plus special guest and first-time participant Japan.

The Leones del Escogido of the Dominican Republic defeated the Charros de Jalisco of Mexico with a 1–0 victory in the Final to claim their fifth title and first since 2012.

== Tournament format ==
A single round-robin format; each team faced each other once. The four teams with the best records advanced to the semifinals (1st vs. 4th and 2nd vs. 3rd). The two semifinal losers met in the 3rd place match and the two winners met in the final to decide the tournament champion.

== Summary ==
In the United States, MLB Network broadcast the tournament in its entirety in English while ESPN Deportes and ESPN+ broadcast in Spanish.

Japan was represented by "Japan Breeze," a team organized by former Major League Baseball (MLB) player and Japanese Baseball Hall of Famer Alex Ramírez and assisted in coaching by former MLB players Keiichi Yabu and Hisanori Takahashi. The team included players from Japan's industrial and independent minor leagues.

The final game of the Preliminary Round saw Jesús Vargas of the Cardenales de Lara throw an 8-inning no-hitter against Japan Breeze.

== Participating teams ==
Country	Team	Manager	Means of qualification
Dominican Republic	Leones del Escogido	(Dominican Republic) Albert Pujols	Winners of the 2024–25 Dominican Professional Baseball League (LIDOM)
Japan	Japan Breeze	(Venezuela) Alex Ramírez	Invited by the Caribbean Professional Baseball Confederation (CPBC)
Mexico	Charros de Jalisco	(Mexico) Benji Gil	Winners of the 2024–25 Mexican Pacific League (LMP)
Puerto Rico	Indios de Mayagüez	(Puerto Rico) Wil Cordero	Winners of the 2024–25 Puerto Rican Professional Baseball League (LBPRC)
Venezuela	Cardenales de Lara	(Venezuela) Henry Blanco	Winners of the 2024–25 Venezuelan Professional Baseball League (LVBP)

== Preliminary round ==
=== Standings ===
Pos	Team	Pld	W	L	RF	RA	RD	PCT	GB	Qualification
1	(Mexico) Charros de Jalisco (H)	4	4	0	19	4	+15	1.000	—	Advanced to knockout stage
2	(Venezuela) Cardenales de Lara	4	2	2	21	9	+12	.500	2	Advanced to knockout stage
3	(Dominican Republic) Leones del Escogido	4	2	2	21	13	+8	.500	2	Advanced to knockout stage
4	(Puerto Rico) Indios de Mayagüez	4	2	2	19	27	−8	.500	2	Advanced to knockout stage
5	Japan Breeze	4	0	4	5	32	−27	.000	4	

Source: CPBC
Rules for classification: 1) Wins; 2) Head-to-head matches; 3) Team quality balance; 4) Batting average; 5) Drawing of lots.
(H) Hosts

=== Schedule ===
Time zone: Mexicali (UTC−08:00)

Game	Date	Time	Away	Result	Home	Stadium	Attendance
1	January 31	13:30	Cardenales de Lara (Venezuela)	0–2	(Dominican Republic) Leones del Escogido	Estadio Nido de los Águilas	11,495
2	January 31	20:00	Indios de Mayagüez (Puerto Rico)	1–8	(Mexico) Charros de Jalisco	Estadio Nido de los Águilas	17,000
3	February 1	12:50	Leones del Escogido (Dominican Republic)	12–1	Japan Breeze	Estadio Nido de los Águilas	11,850
4	February 1	17:50	Charros de Jalisco (Mexico)	2–1	(Venezuela) Cardenales de Lara	Estadio Nido de los Águilas	17,000
5	February 2	12:50	Japan Breeze	2–3	(Puerto Rico) Indios de Mayagüez	Estadio Nido de los Águilas	13,355
6	February 2	17:50	Leones del Escogido (Dominican Republic)	0–2	(Mexico) Charros de Jalisco	Estadio Nido de los Águilas	17,000
7	February 3	12:00	Cardenales de Lara (Venezuela)	10–5	(Puerto Rico) Indios de Mayagüez	Estadio Nido de los Águilas	13,232
8	February 3	17:00	Charros de Jalisco (Mexico)	7–2	Japan Breeze	Estadio Nido de los Águilas	17,000
9	February 4	14:00	Indios de Mayagüez (Puerto Rico)	10–7	(Dominican Republic) Leones del Escogido	Estadio Nido de los Águilas	11,167
10	February 4	19:00	Japan Breeze	0–10 (8)	(Venezuela) Cardenales de Lara	Estadio Nido de los Águilas	13,309

== Knockout stage ==
Semi-finals
February 5
3 (Dominican Republic) Leones del Escogido (F/11)	5
2 (Venezuela) Cardenales de Lara	4
February 5
4 (Puerto Rico) Indios de Mayagüez	1
1 (Mexico) Charros de Jalisco	3

Final
February 7
3 (Dominican Republic) Leones del Escogido	1
1 (Mexico) Charros de Jalisco	0
Third place play-off
February 6
4 (Puerto Rico) Indios de Mayagüez	7
2 (Venezuela) Cardenales de Lara	4

=== Semi-finals ===
Game	Date	Time	Away	Result	Home	Stadium	Attendance
11	February 5	14:00	Leones del Escogido (Dominican Republic)	5–4 (11)	(Venezuela) Cardenales de Lara	Estadio Nido de los Águilas	11,901
12	February 5	19:00	Indios de Mayagüez (Puerto Rico)	1–3	(Mexico) Charros de Jalisco	Estadio Nido de los Águilas	17,000

=== Third-place play-off ===
Game	Date	Time	Away	Result	Home	Stadium	Attendance
13	February 6	19:00	Indios de Mayagüez (Puerto Rico)	7–4	(Venezuela) Cardenales de Lara	Estadio Nido de los Águilas	11,810

=== Final ===
Game 14 – February 7, 2024 19:00 at Estadio Nido de los Águilas in Mexicali, Baja California 75 °F (24 °C), Partly Cloudy
Team	1	2	3	4	5	6	7	8	9	R	H	E
(Dominican Republic) Leones del Escogido	0	0	1	0	0	0	0	0	0	1	4	0
(Mexico) Charros de Jalisco	0	0	0	0	0	0	0	0	0	0	1	1
WP: Esmil Rogers (1–1) LP: Manny Bañuelos (0–1) Sv: Jimmy Cordero (2); Attendance: 18,000; Boxscore

== Statistical leaders ==
As of February 7, 2025

The following tables do not include statistics from the knockout stage.

Batting leaders
Statistic	Name	Team	Total/Avg
Batting average*	(United States) Rudy Martin Jr.	(Mexico) Charros de Jalisco	.462
Hits	4 tied with (Note: Rudy Martin, Alexi Amarista, Eduardo García, Socrates Brito)		6
Runs	(United States) Rudy Martin Jr.	(Mexico) Charros de Jalisco	5
Runs batted in	(Puerto Rico) Eddie Rosario	(Puerto Rico) Indios de Mayagüez	4
Runs batted in	(Venezuela) Danry Vásquez	(Venezuela) Cardenales de Lara	4
Stolen bases	(United States) Billy Hamilton	(Mexico) Charros de Jalisco	4
Stolen bases	(United States) Rudy Martin Jr.	(Mexico) Charros de Jalisco	4
On-base percentage*	(Venezuela) Alexi Amarista	(Venezuela) Cardenales de Lara	.500
Slugging percentage*	(Venezuela) Alexi Amarista	(Venezuela) Cardenales de Lara	.733
OPS*	(Venezuela) Alexi Amarista	(Venezuela) Cardenales de Lara	1.233

* Minimum 2.7 plate appearances per team game

Pitching leaders
Statistic	Name	Team	Total/Avg
ERA	5 tied with (Note: Brooks Hall, Johnny Cueto, Eonald Medrano, Max Castillo, Jesús Vargas)		0.00
Saves	(United States) Trevor Clifton	(Mexico) Charros de Jalisco	2
Saves	(United States) Justin Yeager	(Puerto Rico) Indios de Mayagüez	2
Innings pitched	(Venezuela) Jesús Vargas	(Venezuela) Cardenales de Lara	8.0
Strikeouts	(Puerto Rico) Luis Leroy Cruz	(Puerto Rico) Indios de Mayagüez	7
Strikeouts	(Venezuela) Jesús Vargas	(Venezuela) Cardenales de Lara	7
WHIP*	(Venezuela) Jesús Vargas	(Venezuela) Cardenales de Lara	0.38

* Minimum 0.8 innings pitched per team game

== Awards ==
All-Tournament Team
Pos.	Player	Team
SP	(Venezuela) Jesús Vargas	(Venezuela) Cardenales de Lara
RP	(United States) Trevor Clifton	(Mexico) Charros de Jalisco
C	(Dominican Republic) Francisco Mejía	(Dominican Republic) Leones del Escogido
1B	(Dominican Republic) Yamaico Navarro	(Dominican Republic) Leones del Escogido
2B	(United States) Michael Wielansky	(Mexico) Charros de Jalisco
3B	(Dominican Republic) Kelvin Gutiérrez	(Dominican Republic) Leones del Escogido
SS	(United States) Jack Mayfield	(Mexico) Charros de Jalisco
LF	(United States) Rudy Martin	(Mexico) Charros de Jalisco
CF	(United States) Billy Hamilton	(Mexico) Charros de Jalisco
RF	(Venezuela) Alexi Amarista	(Venezuela) Cardenales de Lara
DH	(Venezuela) Danry Vásquez	(Venezuela) Cardenales de Lara
Man.	(Mexico) Benji Gil	(Mexico) Charros de Jalisco

== Broadcasting ==
Country	Broadcaster(s)	Source
Canada	TLN (English); Univision Canada (Spanish)	
Curaçao	Telecuraçao	
Dominican Republic	Digital15	
Japan	Rakuten TV	
Mexico	TVC Deportes; YouTube	
Puerto Rico	WAPA Deportes	
South America	1Baseball	
United States	MLB Network/MLB.tv (English); ESPN Deportes/ESPN+ (Spanish)	
Venezuela	Televen; BymSport; IVC	

== See also ==
2025 Serie de las Américas
