= Rubén Rivera =

Panamanian baseball player (born 1973)

Piratas de Campeche
- Outfielder / Coach
- Born: November 14, 1973 (age 52); La Chorrera, Panama
- Batted: Right Threw: Right

MLB debut
- September 3, 1995, for the New York Yankees

Last MLB appearance
- May 28, 2003, for the San Francisco Giants

MLB statistics
- Batting average: .216
- Home runs: 64
- Runs batted in: 203
- Stats at Baseball Reference

Teams
- New York Yankees (1995–1996); San Diego Padres (1997–2000); Cincinnati Reds (2001); Texas Rangers (2002); San Francisco Giants (2003)

Career highlights and awards
- World Series champion (1996)
Medals
Men's baseball
Representing Panama
Baseball World Cup
Silver medal – second place	2003 Cuba	National team

Rubén Rivera Moreno (born November 14, 1973) is a Panamanian former professional baseball outfielder who currently serves as the first base coach for the Piratas de Campeche of the Mexican League. He played Major League Baseball (MLB) from 1995 to 2003 for the New York Yankees, San Diego Padres, Cincinnati Reds, Texas Rangers, and San Francisco Giants. With the Yankees, Rivera won the 1996 World Series over the Atlanta Braves. His cousin, Mariano Rivera, was the longtime closer for the Yankees.

== Professional career ==
=== New York Yankees (1990–1997) ===
Rivera was signed by the New York Yankees in 1990. He made his professional debut with the Gulf Coast Yankees in 1992 and his major league debut with the Yankees on September 3, 1995. Rivera was highly touted as a prospect, being ranked as high as second overall amongst prospects by Baseball America in 1995, third in 1996, and ninth in 1997.

He played in 46 games for the 1996 New York Yankees. He was added to the postseason roster, and appeared in the 1996 American League Division Series.

=== San Diego Padres (1997–2000) ===
On April 22, 1997, the Yankees traded Rivera with pitcher Rafael Medina and US $3 million to the San Diego Padres for infielder Homer Bush and minor leaguer Gordon Amerson and two players to be named later, who turned out to be the highly anticipated Japanese pitcher Hideki Irabu and minor leaguer Vernon Maxwell. It was supposed to be a deal to help both teams, but Irabu was a major disappointment for the Yankees, and Rivera turned out to be at least a minor disappointment for the Padres, as he was never able to get on base on a regular basis during his four seasons in the Padres organization, mostly with the parent team (including as a starter in 2000 and 2001), and his considerable power did not sufficiently compensate for that major failing. He was released shortly before the 2001 season.

=== Cincinnati Reds, Texas Rangers & San Francisco Giants (2001–2006) ===
The Cincinnati Reds signed Rivera for the 2001 season, but he did not perform any better for the Reds in a reserve role than he did the Padres. They waived him after the season, and the San Francisco Giants picked him up, but released him a month later without his having played a game for them.

Early in 2002, the Yankees signed him as a free agent, but released him during spring training after Rivera stole teammate Derek Jeter's glove and bat, and then sold them to a sports memorabilia dealer, reportedly for $2,500. After this became known, his teammates allegedly voted him off the team, and the Yankees released him. When the incident became public, Rivera apologized but criticized the team after being removed.

He signed a minor league contract with the Texas Rangers on March 31, 2002, and was assigned to the Tulsa Drillers. He performed poorly for them in a reserve role and was released immediately following the season.

In 2003, Rivera re-joined the Giants as a free agent. He was involved in an infamous baserunning gaffe in a 13-inning 4–3 win over the Arizona Diamondbacks at Pacific Bell Park on May 27. Representing the potential winning run as a pinch runner for Andrés Galarraga at first base with a 2–2 score and one out in the ninth, Rivera advanced to second base but reversed course two steps beyond it thinking that the ball hit by Marquis Grissom to deep right-center field was caught by right fielder David Dellucci. Realizing that Dellucci had muffed the ball for an error, he ran past second base without touching it, so needed to backtrack before heading to third. By that time, it appeared Rivera was going to be thrown out by a considerable distance, when second baseman Junior Spivey's relay throw bounced off third baseman Alex Cintrón's glove and towards shortstop Tony Womack. Rivera took off from third base to home, but Womack easily threw out the sliding Rivera at home plate. Rivera's actions were proclaimed by Giants broadcaster Jon Miller as "the worst baserunning in the history of the game." He was released by the Giants on June 3 after batting .180 with two homers and four runs batted in (RBI) in 31 games.

Rivera signed a minor league contract with the Baltimore Orioles one month later on July 3, 2003, and played with the Bowie Baysox. The Chicago White Sox signed Rivera to play for the Triple-A Charlotte Knights for 2006, where despite hitting 16 home runs, he batted only .239.

=== Mexican League (2007–2019) ===
He played for the Piratas de Campeche from 2007 to 2012, switched to Delfines de Ciudad del Carmen in 2013. In 2014, he played center field for the Rieleros de Aguascalientes. In 2015, Rivera played for both the Diablos Rojos del México and the Olmecas de Tabasco. In 2016, he started the season with the Olmecas de Tabasco before he was traded to the Pericos de Puebla, who ended up winning the League Championship. In 2017, he was traded to the Acereros de Monclova. Rivera announced his retirement following the 2019 season with Monclova, winning a championship in his last season as an active player.

=== World Baseball Classic (2006, 2009) ===
Rivera played in both the 2006 and 2009 World Baseball Classic for Panama's national team. He went a combined 3 for 16 with 1 home run and 5 strikeouts across both tournaments.

== Coaching career ==
Rivera served as hitting coach for the Olmecas de Tabasco of the Mexican League for the 2021 season.

Rivera was named manager of the Águilas Metropolitanas for the 2026 Serie de las Américas, to be held in Venezuela.
