= Águilas Metropolitanas =

Panamanian baseball team

Information
- League: Panamanian Professional Baseball League
- Location: Panama City
- Ballpark: Estadio Juan Demóstenes Arosemena
- Serie de las Américas championships: 2025
- League championships: 1 (2024-25)
- Colors: Red, navy blue, white

The Águilas Metropolitanas (English: Metropolitan Eagles) are a professional baseball team based in Panama City, competing in the Panamanian Professional Baseball League (Probeis).

Águilas were first established during the 2014—15 Probeis season, after a previous team in Panama City, the Diablos Rojos de Panamá, folded.

They debuted under manager Raúl Domínguez, a coach in the New York Yankees organization, with the franchise's first game played on December 15, 2014 against the Indios de Urracá, at the Estadio Omar Torrijos in Santiago de Veraguas. Águilas were runners-up in their inaugural season, as well as in 2015–16, 2018–19, and 2023–24. In its early years, Águilas was made up of a young core of future Major League Baseball prospects, including Edmundo Sosa, Jonathan Araúz, and Ramón Laureano.

Águilas Metropolitanas won its first league championship in the 2024–25 season, advancing to the final series despite a 9-12 regular season record, and defeating the Atlánticos de Bocas Del Toro in five games. The team advanced to the inaugural Serie de las Américas in Nicaragua, which it won after defeating the Leones de León.

== International competition ==
=== Serie de las Américas ===
Year	Venue	Finish	Wins	Losses	Win%	Manager
2025	(Nicaragua) Managua	1st	4	3	.571	(Panama) Sebastian Arroyo
2026	(Venezuela) Greater Caracas	4th	5	3	.625	(Panama) Rubén Rivera
Total			9	6	.600	

== Roster ==
Águilas Metropolitanas roster – 2025 Serie de las Américas
Players		Coaches
Pitchers: (Panama) Antonio Frias; (Panama) Enrique Saldana; (Panama) Harold Arauz; (Brazil) Heitor Tokar; (Dominican Republic) Jorge Bautista; (Panama) Jorge Garcia; (Dominican Republic) Jose Molina; (Panama) Kevin Rodriguez; (Panama) Luis Ramos; (Dominican Republic) Ronaldo Alesandro; (Dominican Republic) Sergio Morillo; (Panama) Severino González	Catchers: (Panama) Gamaliel Gonzalez; (Panama) Pedro Aguilar; (Panama) Erasmo Caballero; (Panama) Robert Mullen; Infielders: (United States) Austin Dennis; (Panama) Carlos Quiroz; (Panama) German Gil Jr.; (Panama) Gerald Chin; (Panama) Jorge Bishop; (Japan) Ohashi Jumpei; Outfielders: (Panama) Ariel Serrano; (Panama) Abraham Rodriguez; (Panama) Eduardo Vaughan; (Panama) Luis Castillo; (Panama) Juan Alonso	Manager: (Panama) Sebastian Arroyo; Coaches: (Panama) Claudino Hernández; (Panama) Willy Rodriguez; (Panama) Adair Betegon; (Panama) Jose Camarena; (Panama) Ezequiel Quiroz; (Panama) Gregorio Estrada; Roster updated on 14 April 2025
