= Estadio Rigoberto López Pérez =

Nicaraguan baseball stadium

- Interactive map of Estadio Rigoberto López Pérez
- Location: León, Nicaragua
- Coordinates: 12°25′5.56″N 86°52′15.23″W
- Owner: Government of Nicaragua
- Capacity: 7,200
- Surface: Grass

Construction
- Opened: 23 September 2024

Tenant
- Leones de León (LBPN)

Estadio Rigoberto López Pérez is a baseball stadium located in León, Nicaragua. The stadium is named after Nicaraguan poet Rigoberto López Pérez, who is best known as the assassin of dictator Anastasio Somoza García.

The stadium was announced as part of a project announced in 2020 to rebuild and renovate over a dozen sports venues in Nicaragua, which also saw the construction of the new Estadio Roberto Clemente in Masaya. It replaced the former Estadio Heroes y Martires de Septiembre, which was in deteriorating condition. The new stadium was designed to meet Major League Baseball standards and host international games. Its name was announced in 2024, sparking some controversy and disappointment it was not named after prominent figures of Leon baseball such as Noel Areas and Wilton Lopez.

The stadium was inaugurated on September 23, 2024 by an exhibition series between the Nicaragua U–23 baseball team and the Senadores de Caracas of the Venezuelan Major League. It hosted the inaugural edition of the Serie de las Américas in 2025.

== See also ==
- Nicaragua
- Culture of Nicaragua
