= William Cuevas =

Venezuelan baseball player (born 1990)

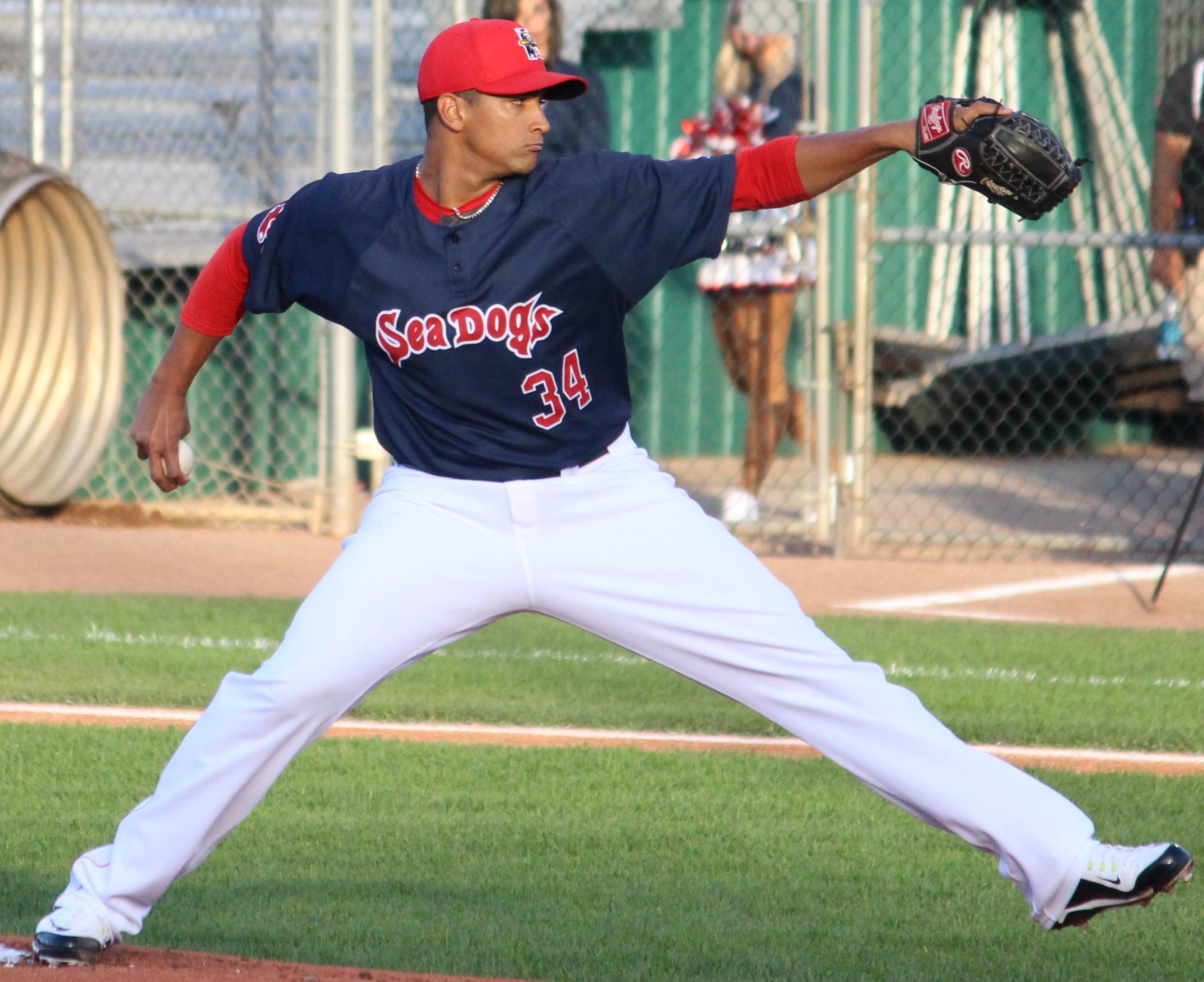
- Cuevas with the Portland Sea Dogs in 2015

Guerreros de Oaxaca – No. 65
- Pitcher
- Born: October 14, 1990 (age 35); Turmero, Aragua, Venezuela
- Bats: Switch Throws: Right

Professional debut
- MLB: April 21, 2016, for the Boston Red Sox
- KBO: March 23, 2019, for the KT Wiz
- CPBL: August 16, 2025, for the CTBC Brothers

MLB statistics (through 2018 season)
- Win–loss record: 0–3
- Earned run average: 8.06
- Strikeouts: 24

KBO statistics (through 2025 season)
- Win–loss record: 55–45
- Earned run average: 3.93
- Strikeouts: 704

CPBL statistics (through 2025 season)
- Win–loss record: 0–1
- Earned run average: 15.26
- Strikeouts: 7
- Stats at Baseball Reference

Teams
- Boston Red Sox (2016); Detroit Tigers (2017); Boston Red Sox (2018); KT Wiz (2019–2025); CTBC Brothers (2025)

Career highlights and awards
- Korean Series champion (2021)

William Enrique Cuevas Osorio [kway'-vahss / oh-so'-re-o] (born October 14, 1990) is a Venezuelan professional baseball pitcher for the Guerreros de Oaxaca of the Mexican League. He has previously played in Major League Baseball (MLB) for the Boston Red Sox and Detroit Tigers, in the KBO League for the KT Wiz, and in the Chinese Professional Baseball League (CPBL) for the CTBC Brothers. Listed at 6 feet 2 inches (1.88 m) and 215 pounds (98 kg), Cuevas throws right-handed and is a switch hitter. He has also played for the Colombia national baseball team.

== Career ==
=== Boston Red Sox ===
==== Minor leagues ====
Cuevas was signed by the Boston Red Sox as an international free agent on June 2, 2009. He spent two-and-a-half seasons with the DSL Red Sox spanning 2009–2011, before joining the GCL rookie team late in 2011. He then was promoted to the Low–A Lowell Spinners in 2012, and played with them for the entire season.

Cuevas emerged during his first season with Lowell, as he posted eight wins and two losses in 77⅓ innings of work, striking out 72 batters while walking only 15 for a solid 4.80 SO/BB ratio. He also set a Spinners record for the lowest earned run average (ERA) in a regular season, as his 1.40 ERA bested the 1.50 mark set by Kyle Weiland in 2008. In addition, Cuevas ranked in the top of several statistical categories in the New York–Penn League, tying for first in wins, for second both in ERA and innings, and for third in strikeouts.

Cuevas was promoted to the High–A Salem Red Sox in 2013 but struggled for most of the year. He posted an 8–9 record and a 5.05 ERA in 26 starts, while striking out 109 and walking 40 in 135⅓ innings. He returned to Salem in 2014, but spent two stints on the disabled list, including one that lasted roughly a month. He then went 2–6 with a 4.70 ERA in 24 appearances (10 starts), including 80 strikeouts and 32 walks in 95⅓ innings.

Cuevas gained a promotion to the Double-A Portland Sea Dogs in 2015, where he was used strictly as a starter and had a solid season, becoming one of five Sea Dogs players selected for the Eastern League All-Star team. Overall, he was 8–5 with a 3.40 ERA in 19 starts for Portland, including 91 strikeouts and 41 walks in 95⅓ innings. He then joined the Triple-A Pawtucket Red Sox in early August, and ended his season on a high note. Cuevas went 3–2 with a 2.63 ERA in seven starts for Pawtucket, striking out 37 and walking 14 in 41 innings. As a result, he completed his seventh season in the Sox farm system setting career highs in wins (11), innings pitched (136⅓) and strikeouts (128), tying for the most wins in the system while ending second in strikeouts and seventh in innings.

==== Major leagues ====
Cuevas started the 2016 season with Triple-A Pawtucket. His contract was purchased by the Red Sox and he was added to their 40-man roster on April 20. Cuevas made his MLB debut the next day, pitching 2 1/3 innings of relief against the Tampa Bay Rays, giving up three hits and two runs while taking the loss. He made two other appearances with Boston during the season, both in June. Overall, with the 2016 Red Sox, Cuevas made three appearances with a 3.60 ERA in five innings pitched, striking out three and walking six. He also pitched 25 games (18 starts) with Pawtucket, compiling a 6–8 record with 4.19 ERA in 131 innings pitched. He became a free agent after the season on November 7.

=== Detroit Tigers ===
On November 19, 2016, Cuevas signed a minor league contract with the Detroit Tigers. The Tigers purchased Cuevas's contract on April 13, 2017, adding him to their active roster. He made his only appearance with the Tigers the next day, pitching 1/3 of an inning against the Cleveland Indians, allowing four runs on three hits. He declined an outright assignment to Triple-A on June 1, 2017, and elected free agency.

=== Miami Marlins ===
On June 7, 2017, Cuevas signed a minor league deal with the Miami Marlins. He played for the Triple-A New Orleans Baby Cakes, appearing in 15 games (11 starts) with a 2–7 record and 5.43 ERA. Cuevas elected free agency following the season on November 6.

=== Boston Red Sox (second stint) ===
On January 5, 2018, Cuevas signed a minor league contract with the Red Sox. He was assigned to Triple-A and made 15 appearances (all starts) with Pawtucket through July 1, compiling a 5–5 record with 3.65 ERA in 86 1/3 innings pitched. The Red Sox selected his contract on July 2, adding him to their major league roster. Cuevas made his season debut with Boston the next day, pitching two innings against the Washington Nationals, allowing one run on two hits; he was optioned back to Triple-A the following day. Cuevas was recalled to Boston on July 8, and without making an appearance was optioned back to Triple-A on July 10. Boston activated Cuevas on August 11, as their 26th player for a doubleheader against the Baltimore Orioles; he pitched in relief in the second game, and was returned to Triple-A the following day. Cuevas was called up to Boston on September 1, when rosters expanded. Cuevas finished the season with an 0–2 record and 7.41 ERA with Boston, while making nine appearances (one start) and striking out 20 in 17 innings. Cuevas was not included on Boston's postseason roster.

=== KT Wiz ===
On November 20, 2018, Cuevas was granted his unconditional release so he could sign with the KT Wiz of Korea's KBO League. Cuevas produced a 13–10 record with a 3.62 ERA and 135 strikeouts over 184 innings in 2019. He re-signed with KT for the 2020 season for $900,000 (and $100,000 in incentives). On December 13, 2020, Cuevas re-signed with the Wiz for the 2021 season on a one-year $750K contract with a mutual option for the 2022 season. In November 2021, Cuevas was designated as the starting pitcher for the first game of the Korean Series in franchise history. He earned the win, pitching 7 2/3 innings and giving up one run on seven hits, with eight strikeouts. He was named MVP of the game. On December 30, 2021, Cuevas re-signed with the Wiz for the 2022 season on a one-year contract worth up to $1.1 million. He suffered an elbow injury following his second start of the season, and was later released by the club on May 18, 2022.

=== Diablos Rojos del México ===
On July 14, 2022, Cuevas signed with the Diablos Rojos del México of the Mexican League. He made one appearance for the Diablos in 2022, surrendering 4 earned runs in 2/3 innings of work.

=== Los Angeles Dodgers ===
On April 3, 2023, Cuevas signed a minor league contract with the Los Angeles Dodgers organization. Cuevas made 11 appearances (nine starts) for the Triple–A Oklahoma City Dodgers, registering a 6.14 ERA with 43 strikeouts in 44 innings of work.

=== KT Wiz (second stint) ===
On June 9, 2023, Cuevas was signed by the KT Wiz of the KBO League. Cuevas was voted Player of the Month for August 2023, going 5–0 in five starts that month, giving up only two earned runs in 36 innings, for an ERA of 0.50. For the month of August 2023, he led all qualified KBO starters in wins and ERA, and was ranked second in strikeouts. In 18 starts for the team in 2023, he registered a 12–0 record and 2.60 ERA with 100 strikeouts across 114 1/3 innings of work.

On December 7, 2023, Cuevas re-signed with the Wiz on a one-year, $1.5 million contract. He made 31 starts for the team in 2024, compiling a 7–12 record and 4.10 ERA with 154 strikeouts across 173 1/3 innings pitched.

On November 29, 2024, Cuevas re–signed with the Wiz on a $1.5 million contract. He made 18 starts for the team in 2025, posting a 3–10 record and 5.40 ERA with 60 strikeouts across 98 1/3 innings pitched. Cuevas was released by the Wiz following the signing of Patrick Murphy on July 12, 2025.

=== CTBC Brothers ===
On July 26, 2025, Cuevas signed with the CTBC Brothers of the Chinese Professional Baseball League; he and Jesús Vargas were signed in an attempt to mitigate multiple injuries to other foreign players. In three starts for CTBC, he struggled to an 0–1 record and 15.26 ERA with seven strikeouts across 7 2/3 innings pitched. Cuevas was released by the Brothers on August 31.

=== Guerreros de Oaxaca ===
On June 10, 2026, Cuevas signed with the Guerreros de Oaxaca of the Mexican League.

== International career ==
Cuevas was born in Venezuela, and is of Colombian descent through his mother. He played for the Colombia national baseball team at the 2017 and 2023 World Baseball Classic.

== See also ==
- List of Major League Baseball players from Venezuela
