= Estadio Fórum La Guaira =

Venezuelan baseball stadium

Estadio Jorge Luis García Carneiro
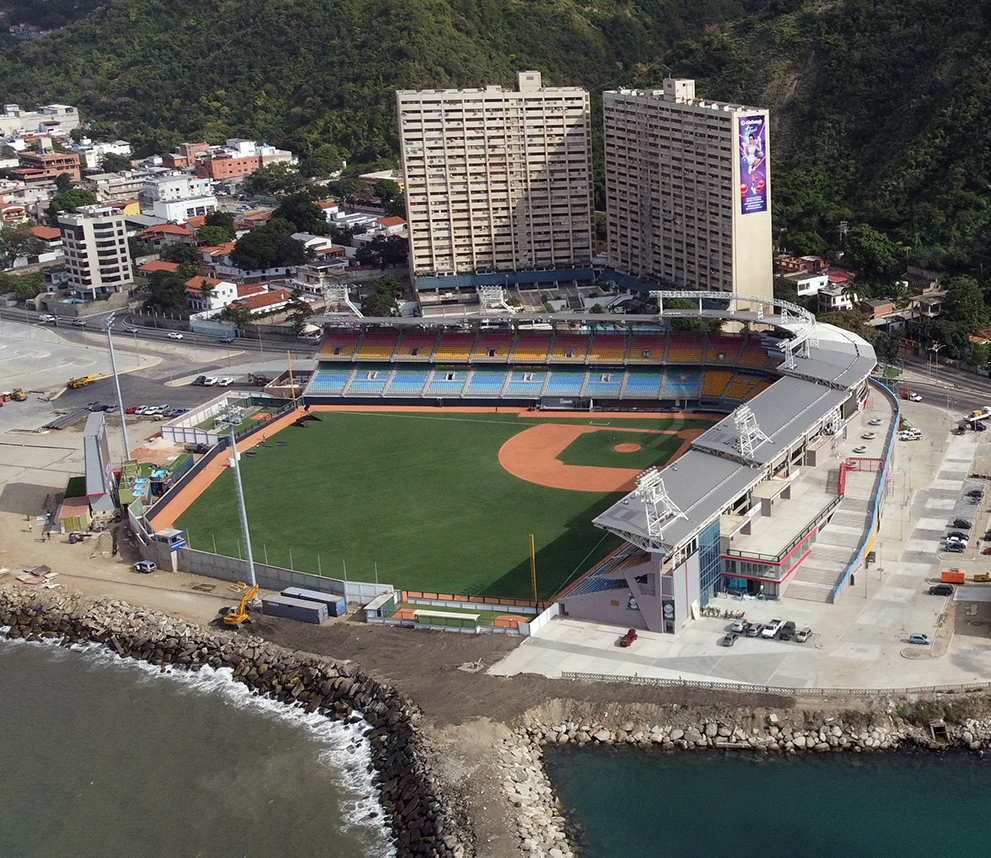
- Estadio Fórum La Guaira in 2023

- Location in Venezuela
- Former names: Estadio Carlos "Café" Martínez (proposed, accepted, then removed before stadium opened), Estadio Fórum La Guaira (2020-22)
- Address: Avenida La Playa, Macuto 1164, Vargas, Venezuela
- Location: Macuto La Guaira, Venezuela
- Coordinates: 10.6029°N 66.9059°W
- Owner: Government of La Guaira State
- Capacity: 14,300
- Surface: Artificial grass
- Field size: Left Field Line – 337 ft (103 m); Centre Field – 400 ft (120 m); Right Field Line – 337 ft (103 m)

Construction
- Built: 2013-2020
- Opened: November 29, 2020
- Cost: 270M Venezuelan bolívars

Tenant
- Tiburones de La Guaira

Estadio Jorge Luis García Carneiro (formerly Estadio Fórum La Guaira) is a baseball stadium located in Macuto, Vargas, Venezuela and the current home of the Tiburones de La Guaira. It has a capacity of 14,300, along with 1200 parking spaces.

The stadium had long been planned as the Tiburones had been playing in Estadio Universitario de Caracas, which is not located in La Guaira, sharing games there with the Leones del Caracas.

The stadium was originally going to be called Estadio Carlos "Café" Martínez after the baseball player born in La Guaira who also played for the team. After 82 months of being built from 2013 to 2020, the stadium was formally inaugurated by president Nicolás Maduro on January 5, 2020, and finally played its first LVBP game on November 29, 2020, an 8–1 win for the Tiburones over the visiting Tigres de Aragua. The stadium was renamed to honour the former governor of La Guaira Jorge Luis García Carneiro in January 2022 following his death on May 22, 2021. The stadium, along with the newly built La Rinconada Baseball Stadium hosted the 2023 Caribbean Series in Greater Caracas.

== Significant firsts ==
- First pitch: Ángel Ventura (HOME)
- First batter: Roel Santos (AWAY)
- First walk: Alexi Amarista (AWAY)
- First hit: Yeison Asencio (AWAY)
- First run scored: Alexi Amarista (AWAY)
- First run batted in: Yeison Asencio (AWAY)
- First extra-base hit: Maikel García, double (HOME)
- First home-run: Alexander Álvarez (HOME)
- First error: Edwin García (AWAY)
- First winning pitcher: Antonio Noguera (HOME)
- First losing pitcher: Wander Beras (AWAY)
