= Caribbean Professional Baseball Confederation =

International regional sports federation

- Abbreviation: CPBC
- Founded: 1948; 78 years ago
- Founded at: Havana, Cuba
- Type: Sports federation
- Headquarters: Santo Domingo, Dominican Republic
- Region served: Caribbean and Latin America
- Members: 4 countries
- President: Juan Francisco Puello Herrera
- Website: seriedelcaribe.net

The Caribbean Professional Baseball Confederation (Spanish: Confederación de Béisbol Profesional del Caribe), or CPBC, is the body responsible for organizing the Caribbean Series, an annual club baseball tournament contested by the winter league baseball champions of the Caribbean and Latin American region. Four professional winter leagues are full members of the CPBC, and various others have been invited to participate in the tournament. It also administers the Caribbean Baseball Hall of Fame.

The CPBC is an independent organization, not affiliated with the World Baseball Softball Confederation (WBSC), which is otherwise recognized as the authority for international baseball tournaments. However, the league and its members are party to the Winter League Agreement with Major League Baseball, which among other provisions allows players under contract to MLB organizations to play winter ball.

== History ==
CBPC was formed in Havana on April 12, 1948, by representatives from the winter leagues of Cuba, Panama, and Puerto Rico. This group would be joined shortly thereafter by Venezuela. At the time, the group considered expanding its membership to Nicaragua, Honduras, and Colombia, though this did not occur before the first Caribbean Series was hosted in 1949. Its creation was sponsored by National Association president George Trautman, who ensured that the various winter leagues were affiliated with MLB-affiliated Organized Baseball.

After the Cuban League was dissolved in the wake of the Cuban Revolution, the Caribbean Series was suspended, and the confederation went dormant. However, it was reorganized for the 1970 Caribbean Series with three teams, the Dominican Republic replacing Cuba and Panama (whose professional league had also ceased operations).

Juan Francisco Puello Herrera has served as commissioner of the CPBC since 1991. Under his tenure, the CPBC established the Caribbean Baseball Hall of Fame. The Caribbean Series also expanded to several new leagues: for the first time since 1960, both Cuba (2014) and Panama (2019) returned to the tournament. The Caribbean Series also saw the debut of teams from Colombia (2020), Nicaragua (2024), and Curaçao (2024). In 2025, Puello Herrera announced he would retire the following year.

== Membership ==
Country	League	First edition
Dominican Republic	Dominican Professional Baseball League	1970
Mexico	Mexican Pacific League	1971
Puerto Rico	Roberto Clemente Professional Baseball League	1949
Venezuela	Venezuelan Professional Baseball League	1949

The original Cuban League and the Panamanian Professional Baseball League were both founding members of the federation in 1948, but their membership lapsed when the Caribbean Series was suspended after 1960.

=== Controversies ===
The confederation has drawn controversy over the participation of non-CPBC members in the Caribbean Series. The Latin American Series was organized in large part due to the exclusion of Colombia, Panama, and other leagues from the Caribbean Series; Colombian league president Édinson Rentería said that the leagues were "tired of waiting for confirmation to play in the Caribbean Series." CPBC President Juan Francisco Puello Herrera said in 2013 the excluded leagues were "competitors" and were "burying their chance" to play in the Caribbean Series.

After Colombia was not invited to the 2024 Caribbean Series in Miami, the Colombian Baseball Federation (FCB) claimed that the CPBC had requested a fee of $200,000 to enter the series, after Colombia had already paid a $100,000 fee with the expectation of joining the CPBC as a full member. FCB president Pedro Salzedo Salom accused the CPBC of selling invitations to the highest bidder. Salzedo also alleged that the regime of Daniel Ortega offered $1 million to secure the participation of a Nicaraguan team in the 2024 tournament, though FENIBA president Nemesio Porras denied this.

Reportedly, CPBC organizers were unhappy with Cuba and Colombia's participation in the 2023 Baseball Champions League Americas, a WBSC-sponsored club tournament.

Commenting on the exclusion of Cuba from the 2024 tournament, CPBC President Puello Herrera acknowledged that commercial factors were taken into account, but denied that they were the main reasons. "Economic factors are essential, as is the sporting aspect, since good baseball will make this stadium fill up again like it did during the World Baseball Classic."

The CPBC also saw backlash after it announced in June 2024 that the 2025 Caribbean Series would include a team from Japan. Many commentators noted that the organization invited an Asian team while neglecting to invite other winter league champions from the Caribbean (including those of Cuba, Colombia, Panama, Nicaragua, and Curaçao). In response, the excluded countries announced the formation of the Americas Baseball Association (ABAM) on September 20, 2024, to organize a rival competition to the Caribbean Series (the "Serie de las Americas"); ABAM president David Salayandia said that its members were free to attend the Caribbean Series "if they receive an invitation," but added that "it will now be under different circumstances."

In November 2026, the CBPC signed a cooperation agreement with ABAM to integrate the two competing circuits. As part of the agreement, the runners-up of the four CBPC leagues would participate in the 2027 Serie de las Américas, alongside the league champions of the ABAM countries. The four CBPC league champions will continue to participate in the Caribbean Series.

== Commissioners ==
- (Cuba) Rafael Inclán (1948)
- (Puerto Rico) Rodrigo Otero Suro (1970–84, 1985–86)
- (Puerto Rico) Santiago Soler Favale (1987)
- (Mexico) Horacio López Díaz (1987–91)
- (Dominican Republic) Juan Francisco Puello Herrera (1991–present)

== See also ==
- WBSC Americas
