= Estadio Monumental de Caracas Simón Bolívar =

Baseball stadium in Caracas, Venezuela

Coordinates: 10.4367°N 66.9405°W

Estadio Monumental de Caracas
- Estadio La Rinconada
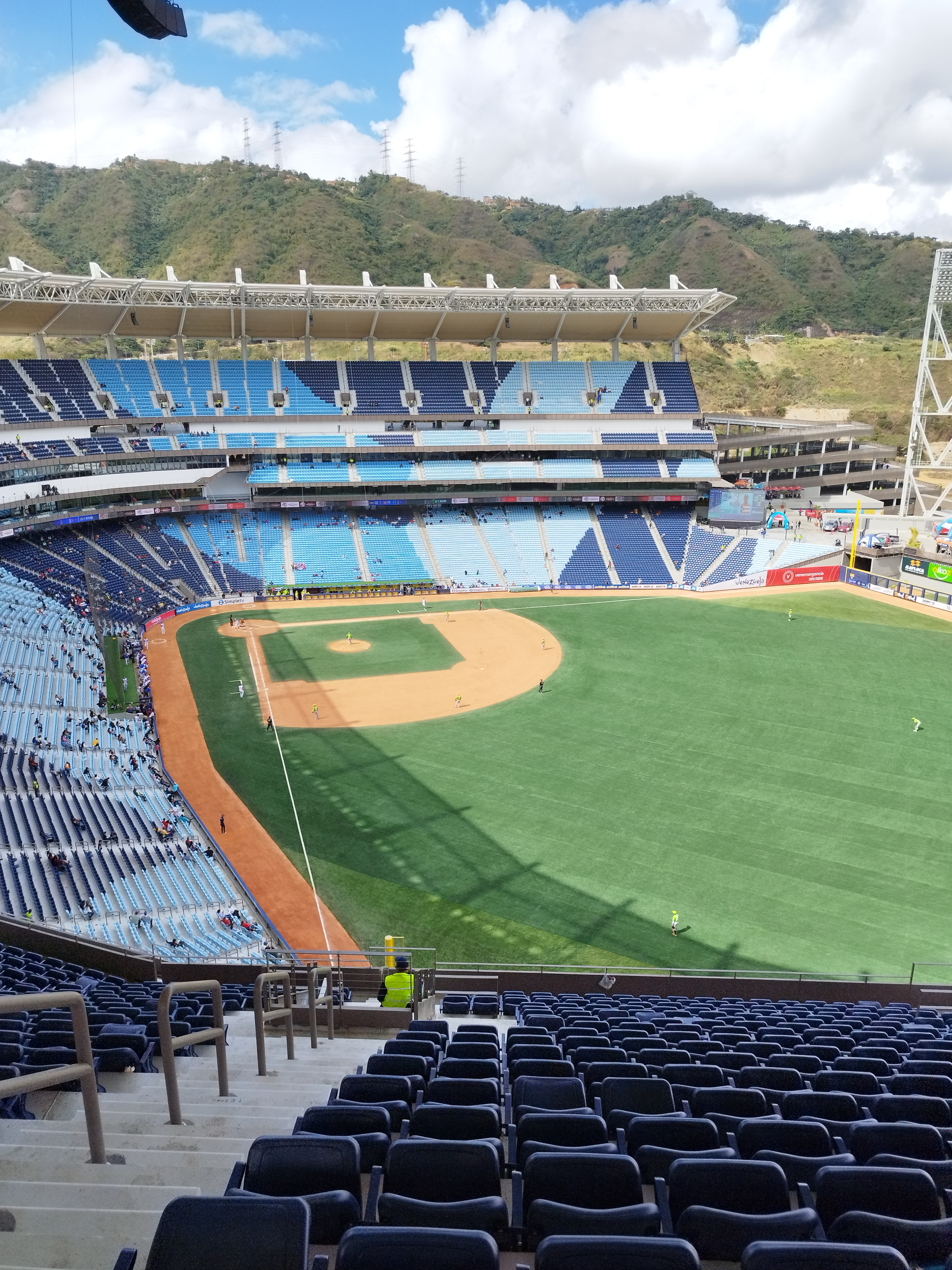
- Interactive map of Estadio Monumental de Caracas
- Full name: Estadio Monumental de Caracas Simón Bolívar
- Location: Caracas, Venezuela
- Owner: Venezuelan state
- Capacity: 35,000
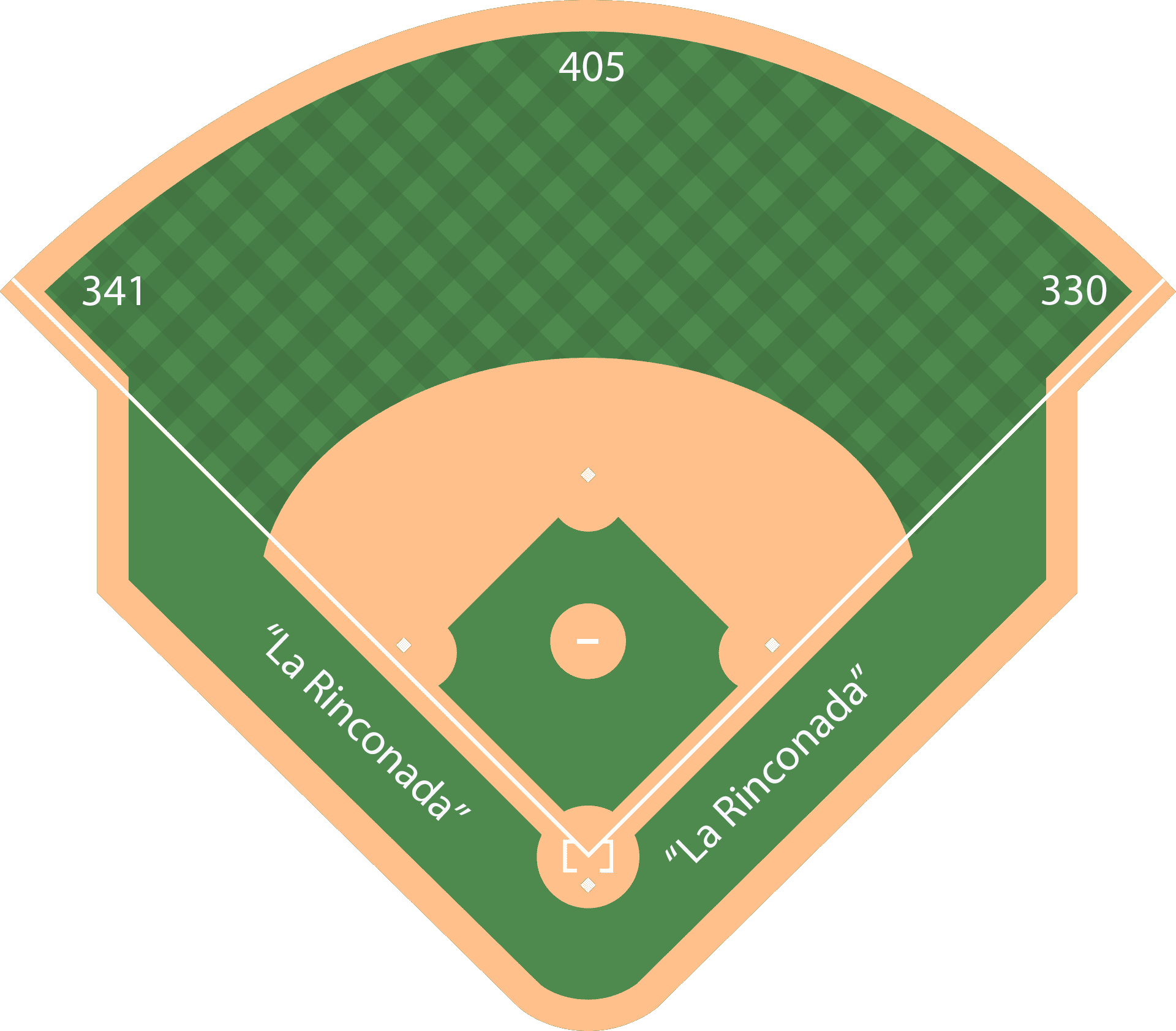
- Field size: Left field: 341 feet (104 m); Center field: 405 feet (123 m); Right field: 330 feet (100 m)

Construction
- Built: 2013–2023
- Opened: February 2, 2023

Tenant
- Leones del Caracas (LVBP) (2023-present)

Estadio Monumental de Caracas Simón Bolívar (English: Monumental Stadium of Caracas Simón Bolívar) is a baseball stadium in the city of Caracas. Specifically, it is located in the neighborhood of La Rinconada next to the Poliedro de Caracas, the Rinconada Racetrack and the future Venezuelan National Football Stadium in the Coche parish, south of the Libertador municipality and the Capital District and west of the metropolitan area of Caracas in Venezuela. For this reason, it is also known as Estadio de Béisbol La Rinconada (English: La Rinconada Baseball Stadium).

The new stadium, designed by Gensler, meets the highest world standards of its kind, and arises from the need to receive a larger number of spectators than the traditional University Stadium of the Central University of Venezuela (Estadio Universitario), which cannot be enlarged because it is part of the campus of the University City of Caracas, an architectural complex that was declared a World Heritage Site in 2000 by UNESCO

Inaugurated on February 2, 2023, by Venezuelan President Nicolas Maduro, it hosted 2023 Caribbean Series; the championship game between Venezuela and Panama broke the tournament's attendance record for a championship game, with 35,691 fans in the stands.

== Name ==
Planned as early as 2013, the stadium was originally named "Estadio Comandante Hugo Chávez," after the late Venezuelan president, but this generated controversy especially in sectors of the political opposition in Venezuela. However, in November 2022 the Venezuelan government announced that the stadium would tentatively be named "Estadio Isaías 'Látigo' Chávez" in honor of the late Venezuelan baseball player.

In 2023, though, the Caribbean Professional Baseball Confederation referred to the stadium simply as the "Estadio La Rinconada", as part of the official calendar for the 2023 Caribbean Series, due to the area of the Coche parish where the stadium was being built. To distinguish it from the association football stadium being built next to it, it was also referred to as "Estadio de Béisbol de La Rinconada." Finally, a few days after its inauguration, the Venezuelan government adopted the official name of "Estadio Monumental de Caracas Simón Bolívar " in honor of the Venezuelan military, political and independence hero of the same name.

== History ==
For years, the possibility of building a new baseball stadium was evaluated due to the fact that the one located in Ciudad Universitaria had exceeded its capacity. In 2013 it was finally decided to approve a project as part of the Hugo Chávez Park in La Rinconada, a complex that also includes among others a Football stadium. That same year earthworks began very close to the Poliedro de Caracas.

The stadium was delayed due to economic difficulties but new resources were approved in 2015 and 2016. However, by 2021 it had not yet been completed.

In 2022 the government of the Mayor's Office of the Libertador Municipality announced new resources for its completion. The president of the Venezuelan Professional Baseball League, Giuseppe Palmisano said that although initially the 2023 Caribbean Series would be held only at the University Stadium of the UCV (San Pedro Parish, Caracas) and the Forum State of La Guaira (Macuto Parish) it is expected that the structure will be completed in November 2022 so that it can also host the event to be held in February 2023.

The stadium was finally approved to serve as one of the two venues for the Caribbean Series in February 2023 along with La Guaira Forum Stadium.

The Leones del Caracas, one of the major baseball clubs from Venezuela, moved to the Monumental Stadium of Caracas Simón Bolívar in the 2023 season after spending the previous 70 years at the Estadio Universitario.

== Dimensions ==
Dimensions of the playing field of the Monumental Stadium of Caracas Simón Bolívar are:

Zona	Feet (ft)
LF	341
CF	405
RF	330

== See also ==
- Lists of stadiums
