= Yeison Asencio =

Dominican baseball player (born 1989)

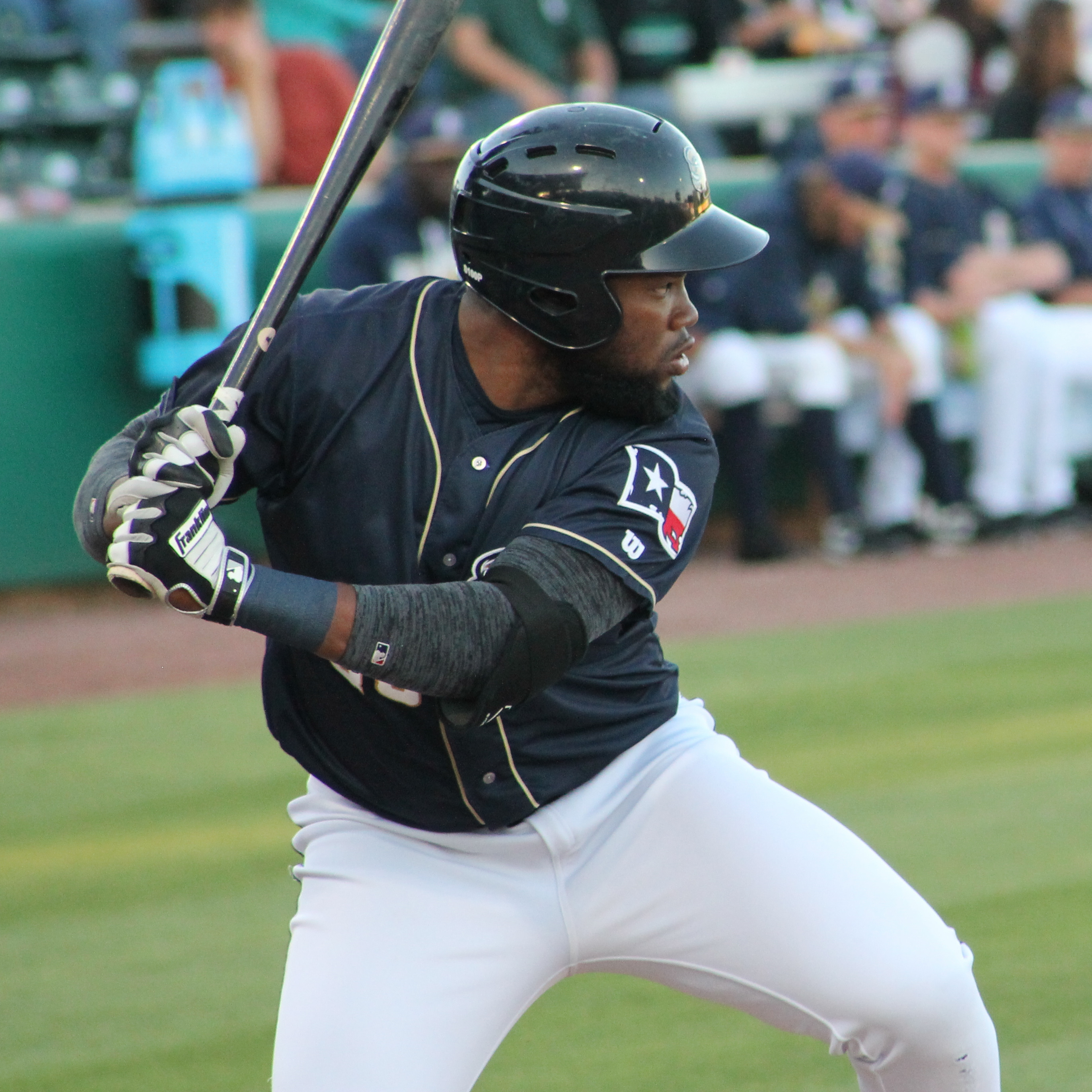
- Asencio with the San Antonio Missions in 2016

Free agent
- Outfielder
- Born: November 14, 1989 (age 36); Santo Domingo, Dominican Republic
- Bats: Right Throws: Right
- Stats at Baseball Reference

Yeison Asencio (born November 14, 1989) is a Dominican professional baseball outfielder who is a free agent. He was signed by the San Diego Padres as an international free agent in 2009.

== Career ==
=== San Diego Padres ===
Asencio signed with the Padres as an international free agent on July 2, 2009. He used false documents to sign, going by the name "Yoan Alcantra", to portray himself as 2 1/2 years younger than he actually was. He made his professional debut in 2010 with the Dominican Summer League Padres, slashing .241./.332/.395 with 5 home runs and 37 RBI. In 2011, he played for the AZL Padres, logging a batting line of .348/.367/.586 with 7 home runs and 46 RBI. The following year, Asencio played in 92 games for the Single-A Fort Wayne TinCaps, posting a .323/.353/.474 batting line with 8 home runs and 61 RBI.

The Padres added Asencio to their 40-man roster after the 2012 season. In 2013, Asencio represented the Padres at the All-Star Futures Game. He split the 2013 season between the High-A Lake Elsinore Storm and the Double-A San Antonio Missions, accumulating a .277/.307/.401 slash line with 7 home runs and 76 RBI in 131 games. He began the 2014 season with San Antonio, before being promoted to the Triple-A El Paso Chihuahuas on August 11 after Rymer Liriano was promoted to the major leagues. Between the two teams, Asencio slashed .291/.330/.433 with a career-high 15 home runs and 59 RBI. On November 20, 2014, Asencio was designated for assignment by the Padres. On November 25, he cleared waivers and was outrighted to El Paso.

Asencio spent the 2015 season in San Antonio, hitting .301/.329/.434 with 13 home runs and 74 RBI in 126 contests. He split time between San Antonio and El Paso to begin the 2016 season, but was released on June 6, 2016, after hitting a combined .267/.288/.335.

=== Tigres de Quintana Roo ===
On June 10, 2016, Asencio signed with the Tigres de Quintana Roo of the Mexican League. In 56 games to finish out the year, Asencio slashed .308/.338/.488 with 6 home runs and 43 RBI. He became a free agent from the Tigres de Quintana Roo after the 2016 season.

=== Ishikawa Million Stars ===
On March 31, 2017, he signed with the Ishikawa Million Stars of Baseball Challenge League. On August 18, he became a free agent.

=== Tecolotes de los Dos Laredos ===
On April 27, 2018, Asencio signed with the Tecolotes de los Dos Laredos of the Mexican League. He appeared in 27 games with the team, batting .273/.304/.382 with 2 home runs and 13 RBI. Asencio was released on June 5.

=== Diablos Rojos del México ===
On July 18, 2018, Asencio signed with the Diablos Rojos del México of the Mexican League. In 43 games with México, Asencio slashed .386/.432/.642 with 11 home runs and 37 RBI. After the season, Asencio was voted the best right fielder of the Mexican League for 2018. He was released on February 19, 2019.

=== Olmecas de Tabasco ===
On April 3, 2019, Asencio signed with the Olmecas de Tabasco of the Mexican League. He was released on April 15, despite hitting .324/.333/.531.

=== Leones de Yucatán ===
On April 16, 2019, Asencio signed with the Leones de Yucatán of the Mexican League. Asencio hit .315/.372/.517 with 13 home runs and 52 RBI in 70 games with the team, but was released on July 22, 2019.

=== Toros de Tijuana ===
On July 29, 2019, Asencio signed with the Toros de Tijuana of the Mexican League. In 25 games to finish out the season with Tijuana, Asencio slashed .260/.280/.385 with 3 home runs and 13 RBI. He was released after the season on October 7.

=== Piratas de Campeche ===
On July 6, 2021, Asencio signed with the Piratas de Campeche of the Mexican League. Appearing in 29 games, he batted .327/.400/.727 with four home runs and 15 RBI. In 2022, he once again put up impressive numbers, slashing .346/.402/.533 with 11 home runs and 53 RBI in 86 games. Asencio re-signed again for 2023 and hit .316/.356/.441 with five home runs and 22 RBI prior to his release on June 20, 2023.

=== Saraperos de Saltillo ===
On July 5, 2024, Asencio signed with the Saraperos de Saltillo of the Mexican League. In 19 games for Saltillo, he slashed .352/.378/.465 with one home run and 16 RBI. Asencio was released by the Saraperos on October 16.

=== Sioux City Explorers ===
On December 9, 2025, Asencio signed with the Sioux City Explorers of the American Association of Professional Baseball. He was released prior to the start of the season.
