= Jesús Vargas (baseball) =

Venezuelan baseball player (born 1998)

CTBC Brothers – No. 89
- Pitcher
- Born: August 18, 1998 (age 27); Macuto, Venezuela
- Bats: Right Throws: Right

CPBL debut
- September 16, 2025, for the CTBC Brothers

CPBL statistics (through 2025 season)
- Win–loss record: 0–1
- Earned run average: 3.72
- Strikeouts: 9
- Stats at Baseball Reference

Teams
- CTBC Brothers (2025–present)

Jesús Miguel Vargas (born August 18, 1998) is a Venezuelan professional baseball pitcher for the CTBC Brothers of the Chinese Professional Baseball League (CPBL).

== Career ==
=== Los Angeles Dodgers ===
On December 2, 2014, Vargas signed with the Los Angeles Dodgers organization as an international free agent. He spent his first two professional seasons with the Dominican Summer League Dodgers, compiling a 6-4 record and 41 strikeouts in 71 2/3 innings over 16 games (12 starts).

Vargas split the 2017 season between the rookie-level Arizona League Dodgers and rookie-level Ogden Raptors. In 15 appearances (11 starts) for the two affiliates, he posted a combined 5-3 record and 3.59 ERA with 52 strikeouts over 62 2/3 innings of work. In 2018, Vargas played for the AZL Dodgers, Ogden, and the Single-A Great Lakes Loons, accumulating a 4-4 record and 3.99 ERA with 42 strikeouts across 47 1/3 innings pitched. A shoulder injury he suffered near the end of the season caused him to miss the entirety of the 2019 campaign.

Vargas did not play in a game in 2020 due to the cancellation of the minor league season because of the COVID-19 pandemic. He returned to action in 2021 with Great Lakes, now Los Angeles' High-A affiliate, where he posted an 8-5 record and 4.40 ERA with 88 strikeouts in 102 1/3 innings pitched across 24 games (14 starts). Vargas elected free agency following the season on November 7, 2021.

=== New York Mets ===
On December 6, 2021, Vargas signed a minor league contract with the New York Mets. He made 26 appearances (15 starts) split between the High-A Brooklyn Cyclones, Double-A Binghamton Rumble Ponies, and Triple-A Syracuse Mets, accumulating a 4-10 record and 5.66 ERA with 89 strikeouts and one save across 98 2/3 innings pitched. Vargas elected free agency following the season on November 10, 2022.

=== Toros de Tijuana ===
On February 8, 2024, after a year of playing only in winter leagues, Vargas signed with the Toros de Tijuana of the Mexican League. In three appearances for Tijuana, Vargas struggled to an 0-2 record and 10.13 ERA with one strikeout across 2 2/3 innings pitched.

=== Pericos de Puebla ===
On April 26, 2024, Vargas was traded to the Pericos de Puebla of the Mexican League in exchange for Faustino Carrera. In 17 appearances (16 starts) for the Pericos, Vargas compiled a 5-3 record and 4.48 ERA with 58 strikeouts across 84 1/3 innings of work.

In the final game of the Preliminary Round of the 2025 Caribbean Series, Vargas, pitching for the Cardenales de Lara, threw an 8-inning no-hitter against the Japan Breeze.

=== CTBC Brothers ===
On July 26, 2025, Vargas signed with the CTBC Brothers of the Chinese Professional Baseball League; he and William Cuevas were signed in an attempt to mitigate multiple injuries to other foreign players.
