= Rudy Martin Jr. =

American baseball player (born 1996)

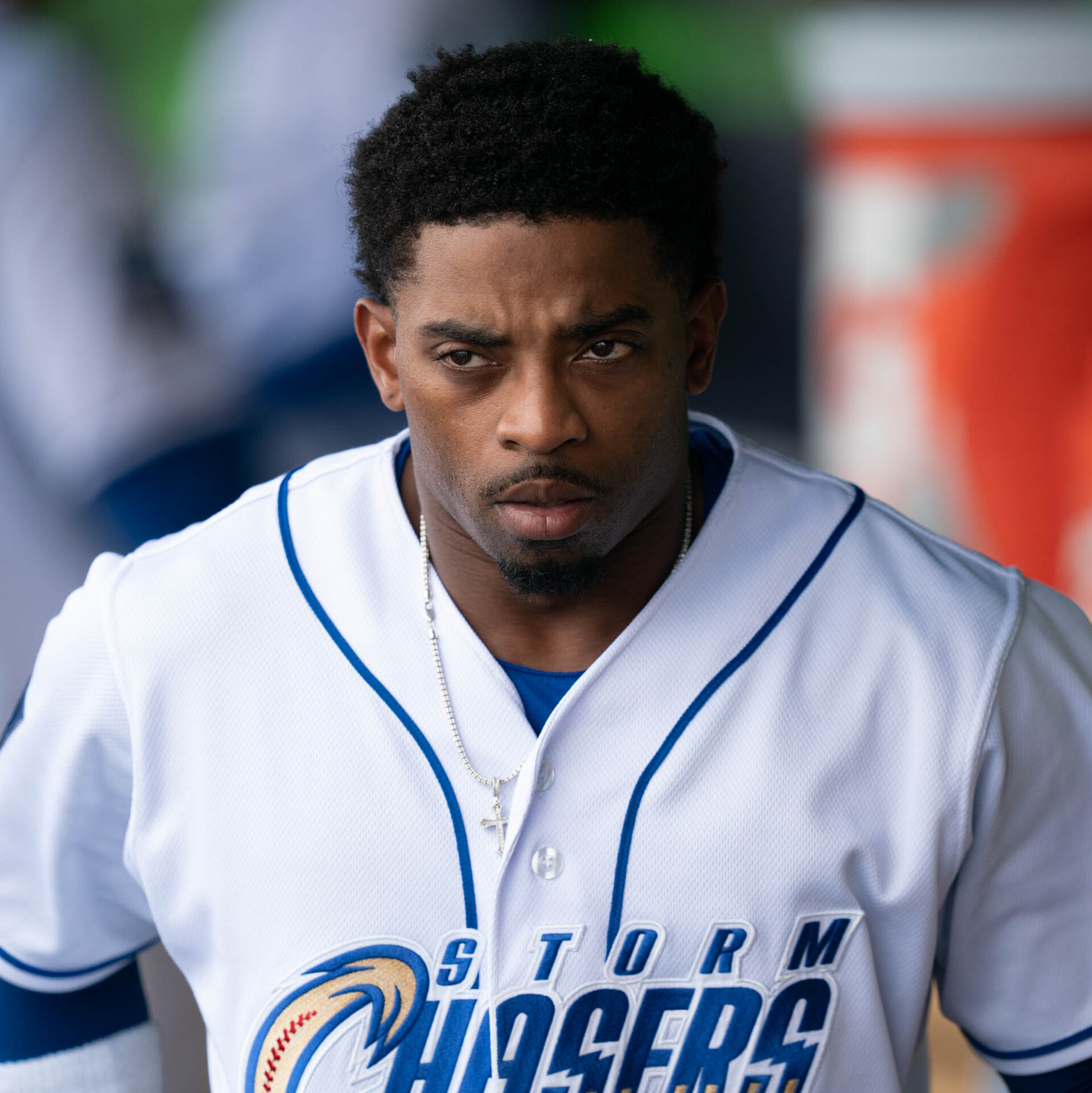
- Martin with the Omaha Storm Chasers in 2026

Toronto Blue Jays
- Outfielder
- Born: January 31, 1996 (age 30); Memphis, Tennessee, U.S.
- Bats: Left Throws: Left

MLB debut
- September 11, 2026, for the Toronto Blue Jays

MLB statistics (through 2026 season)
- Batting average: .000
- Home runs: 0
- Runs batted in: 0
- Stats at Baseball Reference

Teams
- Toronto Blue Jays (2026)

Rudy Martin Jr. (born January 31, 1996) is an American professional baseball outfielder in the Toronto Blue Jays organization. He made his Major League Baseball (MLB) in 2026.

== Career ==
=== Kansas City Royals ===
Martin was selected by the Kansas City Royals in the 25th round, with the 753rd overall selection, of the 2014 Major League Baseball draft. He made his professional debut in 2015, hitting .331 across 42 games for the rookie-level Idaho Falls Chukars and Arizona League Royals. Martin returned to the two affiliates for the 2016 season, posting a .250/.342/.337 slash line with two home runs, 16 RBI, and 20 stolen bases across 46 appearances.

Martin made 37 appearances for the Single-A Lexington Legends during the 2017 campaign, batting .277/.365/.403 with two home runs, 19 RBI, and 26 stolen bases. He split the 2018 season between Idaho Falls, the High-A Wilmington Blue Rocks, and Double-A Northwest Arkansas Naturals. In 85 appearances for the three affiliates, Martin slashed a cumulative .235/.346/.381 with six home runs, 46 RBI, and 29 stolen bases (all career-highs).

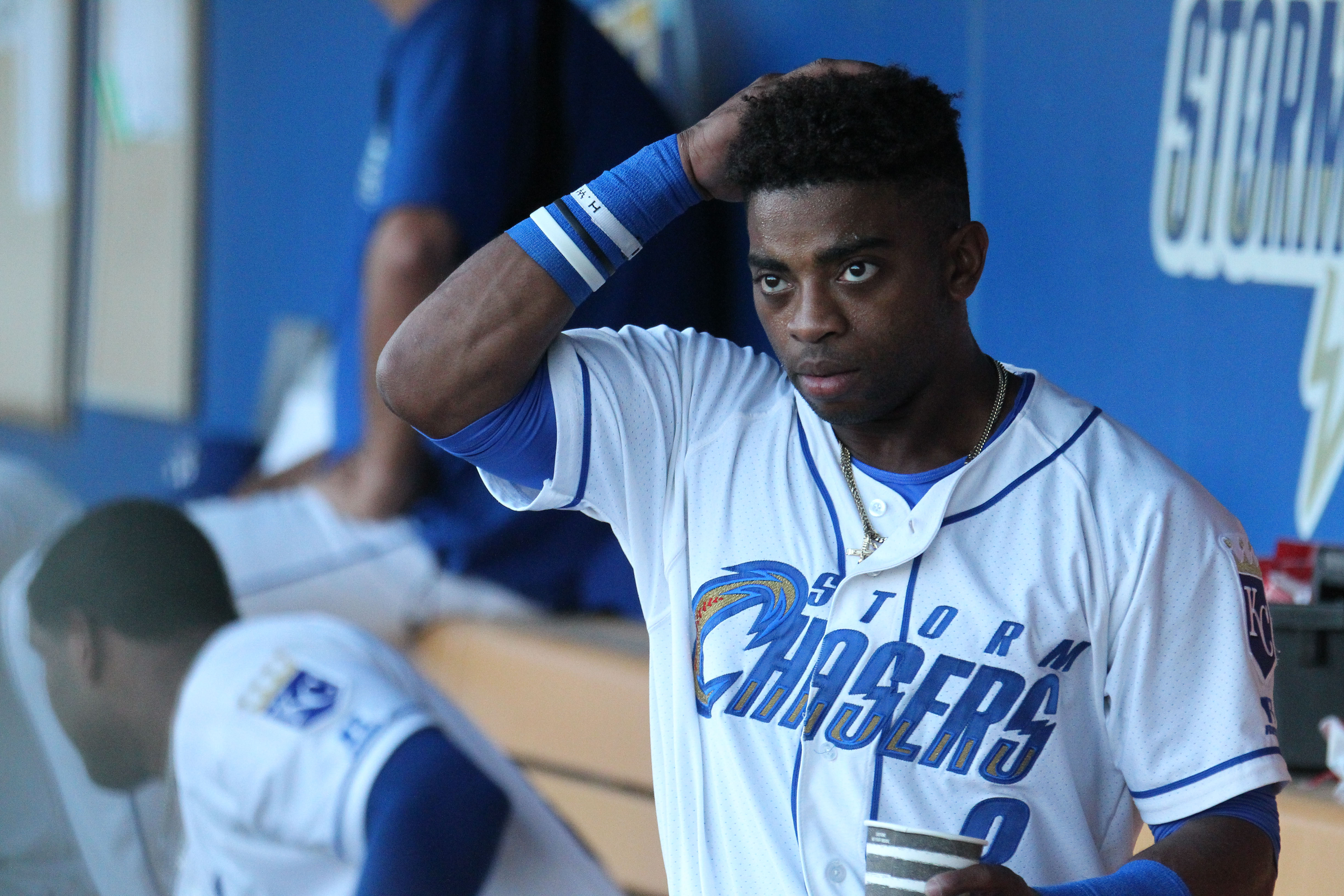
Martin with the Omaha Storm Chasers in 2019

In 2019, Martin made 100 appearances for the Triple-A Omaha Storm Chasers, Wilmington, and Lexington, accumulating a .185/.260/.283 slash line with six home runs, 23 RBI, and 26 stolen bases. He did not play in a game in 2020 due to the cancellation of the minor league season because of the COVID-19 pandemic. Martin returned to action in 2021 with Double-A Northwest Arkansas and the Triple-A Omaha Storm Chasers, slashing a combined .267/.389/.433 with 11 home runs, 51 RBI, and 21 stolen bases across 89 total games. He elected free agency following the season on November 7, 2021.

=== Washington Nationals ===
On January 28, 2022, Martin signed a minor league contract with the Washington Nationals. He made 51 appearances split between the rookie-level Florida Complex League Nationals, High-A Wilmington Blue Rocks, and Double-A Harrisburg Senators, batting a combined .233/.346/.352 with five home runs, 14 RBI, and 17 stolen bases. Martin was released by the Nationals organization on August 27.

=== Milwaukee Milkmen ===
On November 10, 2022, Martin signed with the Milwaukee Milkmen of the American Association of Professional Baseball. Martin made 69 appearances for the Milkmen during the 2023 campaign, hitting .234/.313/.347 with five home runs, 25 RBI, and 21 stolen bases.

=== York Revolution ===
On April 8, 2024, Martin signed with the York Revolution of the Atlantic League of Professional Baseball. Martin made 112 appearances for the Revolution, batting .326/.427/.495 with 12 home runs, 57 RBI, and 78 stolen bases (a franchise record).

=== Toros de Tijuana ===
On December 18, 2024, Martin signed with the Toros de Tijuana of the Mexican League. Martin made 11 appearances for Tijuana in 2025, slashing .316/.458/.421 with five RBI and 10 stolen bases.

=== Kansas City Royals (second stint) ===
On May 6, 2025, Martin's contract was purchased by the Kansas City Royals organization. He spent the remainder of the year with the Double-A Northwest Arkansas Naturals and Triple-A Omaha Storm Chasers, slashing a combined .271/.356/.405 with six home runs, 32 RBI, and 39 stolen bases.

Martin began the 2026 season with Double-A Northwest Arkansas before being promoted to Triple-A Omaha; in 64 appearances split between the two affiliates, he batted a cumulative .284/.414/.441 with eight home runs, 29 RBI, and 33 stolen bases. On July 15, 2026, Martin exercised the upward mobility clause in his contract.

=== Toronto Blue Jays ===
On July 17, 2026, Martin was traded to the Baltimore Orioles and added to the team's 40-man roster; he was subsequently optioned to the Triple-A Norfolk Tides. He was designated for assignment by the Orioles following the promotion of Chadwick Tromp on July 20. On July 23, Martin was claimed off of waivers by the Toronto Blue Jays. He made 10 appearances for the Triple–A Buffalo Bisons, slashing .250/.368/.250 with three RBI and six stolen bases. Martin was designated for assignment by Toronto on August 7. He cleared waivers and was sent outright to Buffalo on August 10. On September 11, Martin was selected back to the 40–man roster and was promoted to the major leagues for the first time. With two outs and in the bottom of the ninth inning against the Baltimore Orioles, George Springer singled to left field and Martin entered the game as a pinch runner, making his major league debut. After only one more appearance, Martin was placed on the injured list with a hamstring strain on September 14. On October 30, Martin was removed from the 40–man roster and sent outright to Triple–A Buffalo. He elected free agency on November 2 after clearing waivers.

On November 5, Martin re-signed with the Blue Jays on a minor league contract for the 2027 season.
