= Danry Vásquez =

Venezuelan baseball player (born 1994)

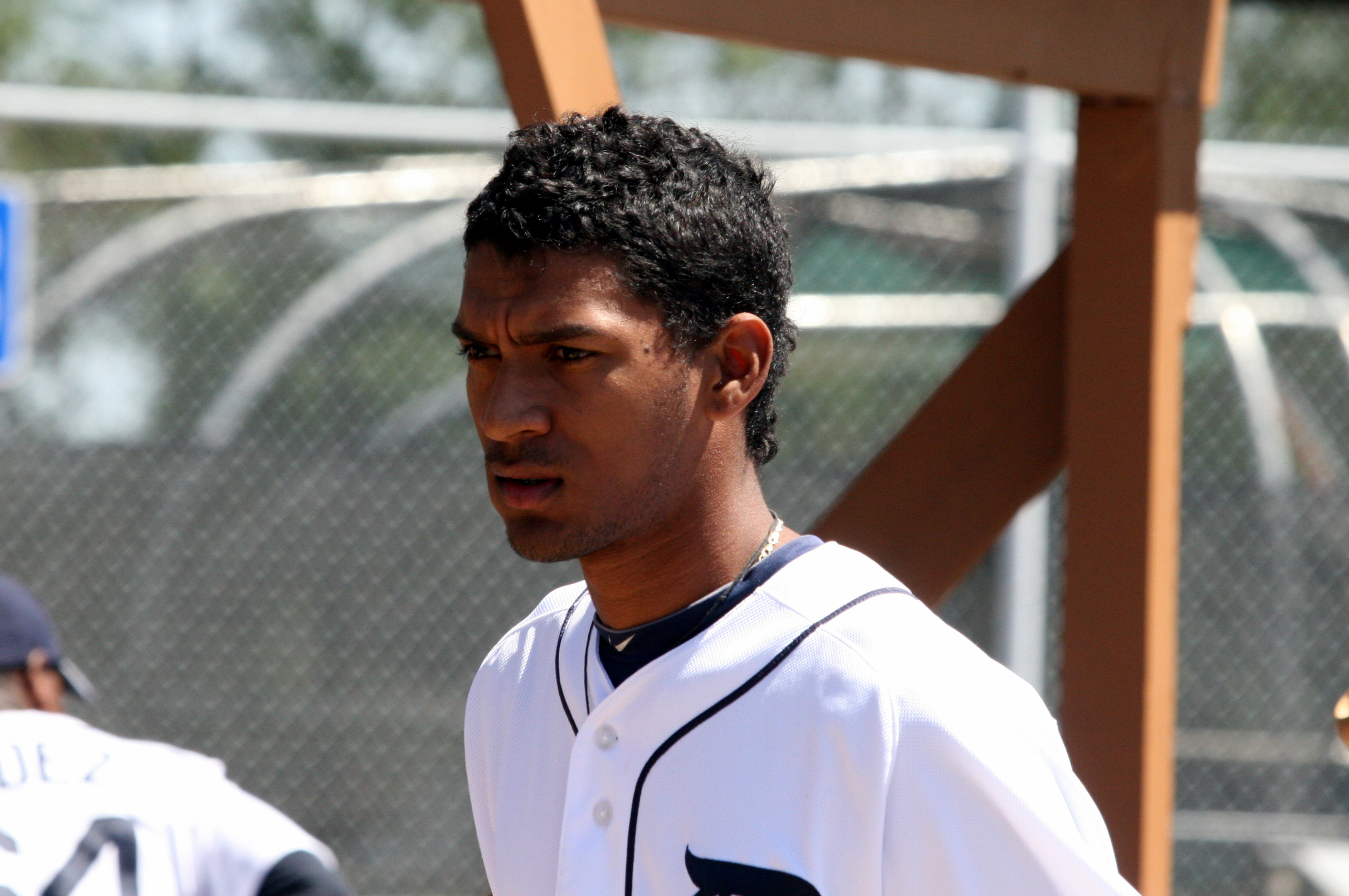
- Vasquez with the Detroit Tigers

Free agent
- Outfielder
- Born: January 8, 1994 (age 32); Ocumare del Tuy, Miranda, Venezuela
- Bats: Left Throws: Right
- Stats at Baseball Reference

Danry Josué Vásquez Blanco (born January 8, 1994) is a Venezuelan professional baseball outfielder who is a free agent. In 2010, the Detroit Tigers signed Vásquez as an international free agent. He was traded to the Houston Astros in 2013.

In 2016, Vaśquez brutally beat his then girlfriend at Whataburger Field which left her with a fractured nose and bruises. The attack was caught on video with Major League Baseball placing Vásquez on administrative leave and the Astros released him. He was charged with domestic violence which was dismissed by prosecutors, Vásquez instead paid an undisclosed fine, did community service, and took anger management classes. In 2018, Corpus Christi police released the video to the public and upon its release, his current team Lancaster Barnstormers released him. He has subsequently played in the Mexican and Venezuelan leagues.

== Career ==
=== Detroit Tigers ===
On June 16, 2011, the Detroit Tigers signed Vásquez as an international free agent, giving him a $1.2 million signing bonus. Vásquez began the 2012 season with the West Michigan Whitecaps of the Single–A Midwest League, but he struggled and was demoted to the Connecticut Tigers of the Low–A New York–Penn League.

After weighing 171 pounds (78 kg), Vásquez gained 12 pounds (5.4 kg) during the 2012–13 offseason. He began the 2013 season with West Michigan, where he had a .281 batting average with five home runs and 39 runs batted in.

=== Houston Astros ===
On July 29, 2013, the Tigers traded Vásquez and a player to be named later (David Paulino) to the Houston Astros in exchange for José Veras. The Astros assigned Vásquez to the Single–A Quad Cities River Bandits of the Midwest League. In 2014, Vásquez played for the Lancaster JetHawks of the High–A California League. He spent the 2015 season with the Single–A Lancaster JetHawks and Double–A Corpus Christi Hooks, batting .272/.321/.364 between the two clubs. Vásquez began the 2016 season with Corpus Christi, and hit .265/.322/.374 in 60 games for the club before his release on August 7, 2016.

Vásquez signed with the Lancaster Barnstormers of the Atlantic League of Professional Baseball, an independent baseball league, for the 2018 season in January. On March 23, 2018, Vázquez was released after video footage of a domestic violence incident involving him were released.

=== Piratas de Campeche ===
On May 4, 2018, Vásquez signed with the Piratas de Campeche of the Mexican League. He hit .289/.388/.459 with 7 home runs and 35 RBI in 72 games. He became a free agent following the 2018 season.

On March 23, 2019, Vásquez signed with the Algodoneros de San Luis of the Liga Norte de México.

=== Rieleros de Aguascalientes ===
On July 29, 2019, Vásquez signed with the Rieleros de Aguascalientes of the Mexican League. In 26 games for Aguascalientes, Vásquez .279/.370/.538 with 7 home runs and 17 RBI. After the 2019 season, he played for the Tiburones de La Guaira of the Liga Venezolana de Béisbol Profesional. In 2020, Vásquez did not play a game because of the cancellation of the Mexican League season due to the COVID-19 pandemic. After the 2020 season, he played for Tiburones of the LVMP. He has also played for Venezuela in the 2021 Caribbean Series. He appeared in 25 games for Aguascalientes in 2021, slashing .279/.414/.494 with 4 home runs and 16 RBI.

=== Sioux City Explorers ===
On May 2, 2022, Vásquez signed with the Sioux City Explorers of the American Association of Professional Baseball. In 59 appearances for the Explorers, he batted .304/.385/.458 with eight home runs and 44 RBI. Vásquez was released following the season on October 11.

=== Tecolotes de los Dos Laredos ===
On January 20, 2023, Vásquez signed with the Tecolotes de los Dos Laredos of the Mexican League. In 86 games, he batted .328/.428/.520 with 11 home runs and 60 RBI. He returned for the 2024 season and slashed .339/.410/.530 with six home runs and 57 RBI. In 2025, Vásquez batted .240/.374/.393 with eight home runs and 43 RBI in 79 games.

=== El Águila de Veracruz ===
On April 14, 2026, Vásquez was loaned to El Águila de Veracruz of the Mexican League. In 14 appearances for Veracruz, he batted .143/.224/.190 with four RBI.

=== Toros de Tijuana ===
On May 16, 2026, Vásquez was loaned by Veracruz to the Caliente de Durango of the Mexican League. However, on May 18, he was subsequently loaned to the Toros de Tijuana of the Mexican League without appearing in a game for Durango. During a game on August 2, against the Acereros de Monclova, Vásquez punched and kicked infielder Rodolfo Amador after taking exception to a tag, starting a bench–clearing brawl. The next day, Vásquez was suspended indefinitely by the Mexican League.

== 2016 domestic violence incident ==
In 2016, while playing for the Corpus Christi Hooks of the Class AA Texas League, Vásquez was arrested on suspicion of assault and domestic violence, after video cameras at Whataburger Field caught him assaulting his then-girlfriend Fabiana Pérez in a stairwell. According to Perez, Vásquez saw her talking to a male friend at the stadium and got upset. The attack left her with a fractured nose and bruises. Perez did not press charges, but said it was not the first time he was violent with her. Major League Baseball placed Vásquez on administrative leave. The Astros subsequently released Vásquez. The domestic violence charge was dismissed by prosecutors after Vásquez paid an undisclosed fine, underwent community service, and took anger management classes. Vásquez and Perez initially got back together after the assault, but their relationship deteriorated soon after. Vásquez has since married another woman.

Vásquez was released from the Lancaster Barnstormers on March 13, 2018, before the season began, after video footage of the domestic violence incident was released to the public.
