= Panamanian Professional Baseball League =

Baseball league in Panama

Probeis
- Sport: Baseball
- Founded: 1946
- CEO: Guy Nacchio
- Director: Lauren Flores
- No. of teams: 4
- Country: Panama
- Confederation: CPBC (1948–60)
- Most recent champions: Federales de Chiriquí (2nd title)
- Most titles: Cerveza Balboa (7 titles)
- Broadcaster: Sertv
- Sponsor: +Movil
- Related competitions: Caribbean Series; Serie de las Américas

The Panamanian Professional Baseball League (Spanish: Liga Profesional de Béisbol de Panamá, or LPBP), commonly known as Probeis, is a professional baseball winter league consisting of four teams based in Panama. Originally founded in 1946, the league has run in its current form since 2011. Along with the summertime Béisbol Mayor championship organized by the Panamanian Baseball Federation, it is one of the two major senior baseball competitions in the country.

The league was one of the founding members of the Caribbean Series, which it participated in from 1949 to 1960 and again from 2019 to 2024. Starting in 2025, the league's champion takes part in the Serie de las Américas.

== History ==
=== 1946–72 ===
Though amateur baseball has existed on the isthmus of Panama, the first professional baseball game in the country was played on January 3, 1946 between Cervería Nacional and Chesterfield; Panamanian President Enrique Adolfo Jiménez threw out the first pitch. The first incarnation of the Panamanian Professional Baseball League joined 'organized baseball" in 1948 and operated continuously until 1972.

The league's champion team played in the Caribbean Series in its first stage from 1949 through 1960, before Fidel Castro dismantled the Cuban Winter League and replaced it with a new amateur circuit.

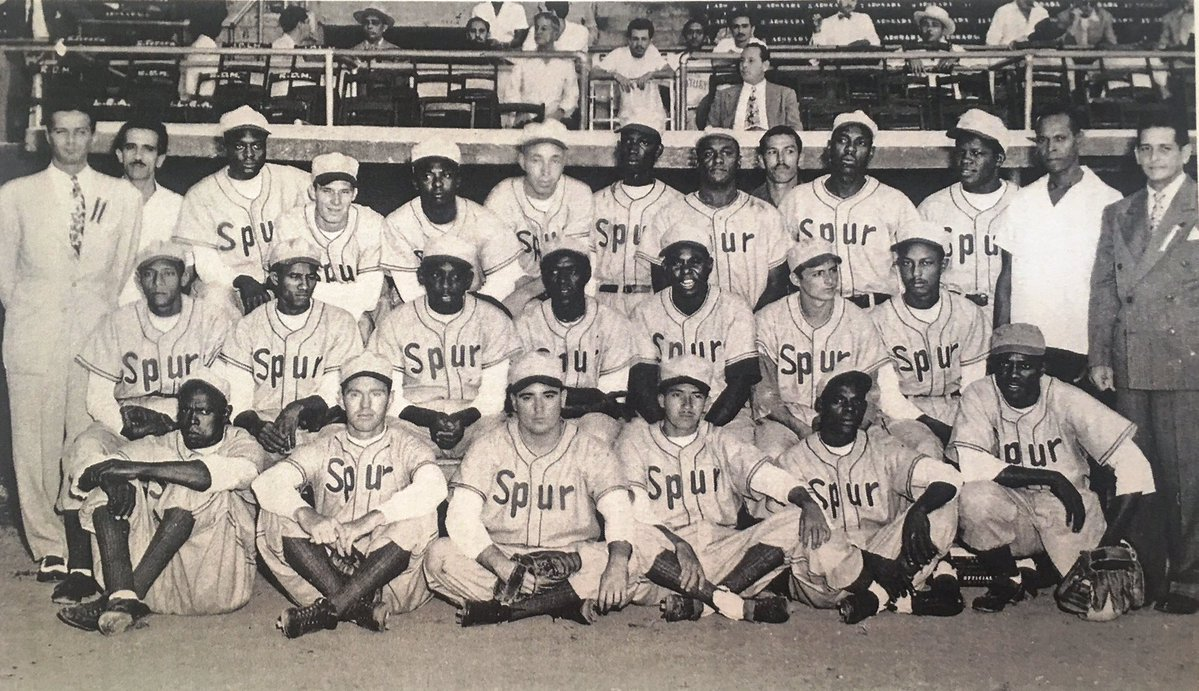
The Spur Cola club went to the Caribbean Series in 1951

The Carta Vieja Yankees were of the most distinguished clubs in the circuit, winning five league titles between 1950–58 and also capturing the 1950 Caribbean Series, to become the only Panamanian team to a win a Caribbean Series in the 20th century. Throughout its 12-year history, the team featured players as Wayne Blackburn, Chet Brewer, Webbo Clarke, Jim Cronin, Jerry Davie, Carl Duser, Marion Fricano, Milt Graff, Bill Harris, Spook Jacobs, Connie Johnson, Spider Jorgensen, Héctor López, Bobby Prescott, Humberto Robinson, Jean-Pierre Roy, Pat Scantlebury, Billy Shantz, Joe Tuminelli and Jim Umbricht, among others.

The 1960s saw Panama enter a period of economic and political instability that forced private companies to withdraw support for professional sports teams. The Panamanian league merged with the Nicaraguan league for the 1961–62 season, after no local sponsors could be found; that season, Panama's Marlboro and Cerveza Balboa played against Nicaragua's Bóer and Cinco Estrellas. In 1965, the league decided to play with only Panamanian players, as a means of cutting league costs; that ended up lowering the quality of the play, leading to deep economic crises that ended with the collapse of the league after the 1971-72 season.

=== Probeis era ===
A new professional baseball league started the 2001–02 season as Probeis (Liga Profesional de Béisbol de Panamá), but it lasted only one season. Four teams participated during the 2001–02 season: Canaleros de Panamá, Macheteros de Azuero, Roneros de Carta Vieja and Tiburones Atlas de Panamá Oeste. Carta Vieja was the champion team, while Olmedo Sáenz won the batting title (.331) and Miguel Gómez was the best pitcher (5-0).

By 2010, executives with the Los Angeles Dodgers of Major League Baseball restarted the Panamanian league as LPB (Spanish: Liga Profesional de Béisbol), but with poor logistics and little financial support, the LPB lasted only one season.

Despite the failure of LPB, professional baseball returned, as Probeis, in 2011. Roneros Carta Vieja won their second Probeis title in 2011-12. In 2012–13, Caballos de Coclé won their first title and Javier Castillo was selected as MVP with a .397 batting average. Caballos de Coclé as champion represented Panama in the first Latin American Series held in Veracruz, Mexico, reaching third place. Industriales de Herrera replaced Diablicos de Azuero for the 2012 tournament.

== Teams ==
As of the 2024–25 season, all of the games are played in two stadiums in Panama City: Estadio Juan Demóstenes Arosemena (capacity and Estadio Nacional Rod Carew (capacity 27,000).

Team	Founded	Represents
Águilas Metropolitanas	2014	Panama City
Atlánticos de Bocas del Toro y Colón	2022	Bocas del Toro / Colón Province
Club Deportivo Los Nacionales	2024	—N/a
Federales de Chiriquí	2019	Chiriquí Province

=== Former teams ===
In the original LPBP (1948–72), many of the teams folded after less than a decade of existence. Only Carta Vieja, Cerveza Balboa, and Chesterfield/Marlboro survived more than ten years.

- Carta Vieja Yankees (1946–59)
- Cerveceria Nacional (1946–53)
- Refresqueros de Spur Cola (1946–54)
- Chesterfield / Marlboro Smokers (Cigarilleros) (1946–72) (Note: Chesterfield from 1948–57, Marlboro from 1957–72.)
- Cerveza Balboa (Brewers) (1956–65, 1966–72)
- Azucareros de Coclé (1958–61)
- Comercios Dodgers (1959–61, 1965–66) (Note: Affiliate of the Los Angeles Dodgers.)
- Novatos de Carta Vieja (Rookies) (1963–65)
- Panalit Roofers (1963–66, 1967–68) (Note: Originally the Cemento Panama Pavers)
- Ron Santa Clara (1966–67)
- Ramblers (1968–69)
- Guardia Nacional (1969–72)

The 1961–62 season was played with two Nicaraguan clubs, Indios del Bóer and Cinco Estrellas, in a merged league. In addition, the 1962–63 season was made up of four completely new teams: Chiriquí-Bocas, Central Provinces, Colon, and Panama. All of these teams lasted only a single season.

The Carta Vieja, Chesterfield, Comercios, and Marlboro teams represented Panama City, while Spur Cola was based in Colon. The Azucareros and Cerveza Balboa teams were sponsored from the cities of Aguadulce and Balboa, respectively. Most of the games were played at Estadio Olímpico de Panamá in Panama City.

In the modern Probeis era, several teams have had brief existences, including:

- Astronautas de Chiriquí / de los Santos (2019–24)

== Champion teams ==
Key
†	Champions also won the Caribbean Series that season
†	Champions also won the Interamerican Series that season
‡	Champions also won the Serie de las Américas that season

=== Original LPBP (1946–72) ===
Season	Champion
1946–47	General Electric
1948–49	Refresqueros de Spur Cola
1949–50	Carta Vieja Yankees ^{†}
1950–51	Refresqueros de Spur Cola (2)
1951–52	Carta Vieja Yankees (2)
1952–53	Chesterfield Smokers
1953–54	Carta Vieja Yankees (3)
1954–55	Carta Vieja Yankees (4)
1955–56	Chesterfield Smokers (2)
1956–57	Cerveza Balboa
1957–58	Carta Vieja Yankees (5)
1958–59	Azucareros de Coclé
1959–60	Cigarilleros del Marlboro
1960–61	Cerveza Balboa (2)
1961–62	Cigarilleros del Marlboro (2)
1962–63	Chiriquí-Bocas ^{†}
1963–64	Cigarilleros del Marlboro (3)
1964–65	Cerveza Balboa (3)
1965–66	Ron Santa Clara
1966–67	Cerveza Balboa (4)
1967–68	Cerveza Balboa (5)
1968–69	Cerveza Balboa (6)
1970–71	Cerveza Balboa (7)
1971–72	Guardia Nacional
No professional baseball from 1972 to 2001

=== Probeis era (2001–02, 2011–present) ===
Season	Champion	Final Series	Runners up	Manager
2001–02	Roneros de Carta Vieja	3–0	Canaleros de Cerveza Panamá	Héctor López
No professional baseball from 2002 to 2011
2011–12 (Note: Season played entirely in December)	Roneros de Chiriquí	2–0	Diablicos de Azuero	Einar Díaz
2012–13	Caballos de Coclé	2–1	Industriales de Herrera	Luis Ortiz
2013–14 (Note: Season played entirely in January)	Indios de Urracá	2–0	Caballos de Coclé	Julio Mosquera
2014–15	Caballos de Coclé (2)	2–0	Águilas Metropolitanas	Luis Ortiz
2015–16	Nacionales de Panamá	3–1	Águilas Metropolitanas	Olmedo Sáenz
2016–17	Panamá Metro		Nacionales de Panamá	Rodrigo Merón
2017–18	Caballos de Coclé (3)	3–0	Bravos de Urracá	Julio Mosquera
2018–19	Toros de Herrera ^{†}	3–1	Águilas Metropolitanas	Manuel Rodríguez
2019–20	Astronautas de Chiriquí	3–1	Federales de Chiriquí	Julio Mosquera
2020–21 season cancelled due to coronavirus pandemic
2021–22	Astronautas de Los Santos (2)	3–0	Federales de Chiriquí	Julio Mosquera
2022–23	Federales de Chiriquí	3–0	Atlánticos de Bocas del Toro y Colón	José Mayorga
2023–24	Federales de Chiriquí (2)	3–0	Águilas Metropolitanas	José Mayorga
2024–25	Águilas Metropolitanas‡	3–2	Atlánticos de Bocas del Toro y Colón	Sebastián Arroyo
2025–26 season cancelled due to financial concerns

== See also ==
- Panamanian Baseball Federation (FEDEBEIS), which organizes a separate amateur league in the country
