= Curaçao Professional Baseball League =

Professional baseball league in Curaçao

- Sport: Baseball
- Founded: 2023
- No. of teams: 3
- Country: Curaçao
- Most recent champion: Willemstad Cannons (2026)
- Related competitions: Caribbean Series

The Curaçao Professional Baseball League (CPB; Papiamento: Kampionato Beisbòl Profeshonal Kòrsou), is a professional baseball circuit in Curaçao. It debuted in 2023 as the highest level of professional baseball in the country, supplanting the summer-time AA League. Unlike the AA League, CPB is not organized by the Curaçao Baseball Federation (FEBEKO) but does carry the certification and approval of the Federation.

The inaugural edition of the tournament took place between December 3 to December 10, 2023, at Tio Daou Ballpark in Willemstad. Curaçao Suns won the title, and represented the country at the 2024 Caribbean Series in Miami. The following year, the league champion, Curaçao Goats, participated at the 2025 Serie de las Américas in Nicaragua.

The league was also slated to participate in the 2024 Intercontinental Series before that tournament was cancelled.

== Current teams ==
Team	Founded
Curaçao Suns	2023
Curacao Goats	2023
Willemstad Cannons	2023

== Champions ==
Season	Champion	Record	Runners up	Manager
2023	Curaçao Suns	3–1	Willemstad Cannons	Ghionello Jansen
2025	Curaçao Goats	2–0	Willemstad Cannons	Soric Liberia
2026	Willemstad Cannons	2–0	Curaçao Suns	Ricardo Vera

== Most Valuable Player ==
Season	Player	Team	Ref
2023	Jonathan Martijn	Cannons	
2025	Juremi Profar	Goats	
2026	Jurdrick Profar	Cannons	
