= Estadio Roberto Clemente =

Roberto Clemente Stadium
- Estadio Roberto Clemente
- Interactive map of Roberto Clemente Stadium
- Location: Masaya, Nicaragua
- Coordinates: 11°58′31″N 86°06′16″W
- Owner: Government of Nicaragua / Municipality of Masaya
- Operator: Instituto Nicaragüense de Deportes
- Capacity: 4,024
- Surface: Natural grass
- Field size: Left field: 325 ft Center field: 400 ft Right field: 325 ft

Construction
- Built: 2021–2023
- Opened: 24 November 2023

Tenant
- Las Fieras del San Fernando

Roberto Clemente Stadium (Spanish: Estadio Roberto Clemente) is a baseball stadium in Masaya, Nicaragua. It is named after Puerto Rican baseball Hall of Famer Roberto Clemente, who died in a plane crash on 31 December 1972 while delivering humanitarian aid to victims of the 1972 Managua earthquake.

The stadium opened on 24 November 2023 and is the home of Las Fieras del San Fernando in the Germán Pomares Ordóñez league. It has a capacity of 4,024 spectators and was built to international standards.

== History ==
Construction began on 3 June 2021 on the site of the previous Roberto Clemente Stadium as part of a national plan to improve sports infrastructure. The project cost approximately 700 million Nicaraguan córdobas (about US$19.1 million).

It was inaugurated on 24 November 2023 with a game between the Nicaragua and Puerto Rico national teams during the U-23 Pan American qualifier for the WBSC Baseball World Cup.

== Facilities ==
The stadium features a natural grass field, electronic scoreboard, video screen, sports lighting, covered seating, dugouts, clubhouses, media facilities, and VIP areas. Field dimensions are approximately 325 feet to the foul poles and 400 feet to center field.

== Events ==
- Home of Las Fieras del San Fernando (Germán Pomares league)
- Venue for the Serie de las Américas 2025
- One of the venues for the 2026 WBSC U-23 Baseball World Cup (along with stadiums in Managua and León)

== See also ==
- Baseball in Nicaragua
- Roberto Clemente
