= 2019 Latin American Series =

- League: Latin American Series
- Sport: Baseball
- Duration: January 26 – February 1, 2019
- Games: 18
- Teams: 6

Latin American Series seasons
- ← 2018 2020 →

The 2019 Latin American Series is the seventh edition of the Latin American Series baseball tournament.

The competition is taking place in Veracruz, Mexico from January 26 to February 1, 2019.

== Qualified teams ==
League	Team
(Argentina) Argentine Baseball League	Falcons de Córdoba
(Colombia) Colombian Professional Baseball League	Caimanes de Barranquilla
Curaçao National Championship AA League	Sta. Maria Pirates-Chippie
(Mexico) Liga Invernal Veracruzana	Tobis de Acayucan
(Mexico) Liga Invernal Veracruzana	Chileros de Xalapa
(Nicaragua) Nicaraguan Professional Baseball League	Leones de León
(Panama) Panamanian Professional Baseball League	Toros de Herrera

- Teams highlighted in red withdrew from the competition. Due to the withdrawal of Curaçaoan team, Sta. Maria Pirates-Chippie, the host Veracruz Winter League sent a second team in their place.

== Venues ==
Four venues are being used for this competition. The main stadium is Estadio Universitario Beto Ávila, with the other three stadiums acting as minor venues.

Acayucan	Heroica Córdoba	Heroica Veracruz	Xalapa-Enríquez
Estadio de Beisbol Luis Díaz Flores	Estadio De Béisbol Beisborama 72	Estadio Universitario Beto Ávila	Parque Deportivo Colón
Capacity: -	Capacity: 12,000	Capacity: 7,782	Capacity: 5,000

== Group Phase ==
Pos.	Team	P	W	L	%	Dif
1.	(Nicaragua) Leones de León	5	5	0	1.000	—
2.	(Mexico) Chileros de Xalapa	5	3	2	.600	2.0
3.	(Mexico) Tobis de Acayucan	5	2	3	.400	3.0
3.	(Panama) Toros de Herrera	5	2	3	.400	3.0
3.	(Argentina) Falcons de Córdoba	5	2	3	.400	3.0
6.	(Colombia) Caimanes de Barranquilla	5	1	4	.200	5.0

Qualified for the semi-final
Eliminated

Date	Local time	Road team	Score	Home team	Inn.	Venue	Game duration	Attendance	Boxscore
Jan 26, 2019	13:00	Toros de Herrera (Panama)	4–6	(Mexico) Chileros de Xalapa	10	Estadio De Béisbol Beisborama 72	-	-	Boxscore
Jan 26, 2019	15:00	Leones de León (Nicaragua)	5–0	(Colombia) Caimanes de Barranquilla	9	Estadio Universitario Beto Ávila	-	-	Boxscore
Jan 26, 2019	19:00	Falcons de Córdoba (Argentina)	1–0	(Mexico) Tobis de Acayucan	10	Estadio Universitario Beto Ávila	-	-	Boxscore
Jan 27, 2019	14:00	Toros de Herrera (Panama)	7–1	(Argentina) Falcons de Córdoba	9	Estadio Universitario Beto Ávila	-	-	Boxscore
Jan 27, 2019	18:00	Caimanes de Barranquilla (Colombia)	1–6	(Mexico) Tobis de Acayucan	9	Estadio de Beisbol Luis Díaz Flores	-	-	Boxscore
Jan 27, 2019	19:00	Chileros de Xalapa (Mexico)	5–6	(Nicaragua) Leones de León	9	Estadio Universitario Beto Ávila	-	-	Boxscore
Jan 28, 2019	13:00	Toros de Herrera (Panama)	3–5	(Nicaragua) Leones de León	9	Estadio De Béisbol Beisborama 72	-	-	Boxscore
Jan 28, 2019	14:00	Falcons de Córdoba (Argentina)	4–5	(Colombia) Caimanes de Barranquilla	9	Estadio Universitario Beto Ávila	-	-	Boxscore
Jan 28, 2019	19:00	Chileros de Xalapa (Mexico)	4–3	(Mexico) Tobis de Acayucan	10	Estadio Universitario Beto Ávila	-	-	Boxscore
Jan 29, 2019	17:00	Caimanes de Barranquilla (Colombia)	11–12	(Mexico) Chileros de Xalapa	9	Parque Deportivo Colón	-	-	Boxscore
Jan 29, 2019	19:00	Toros de Herrera (Panama)	0–4	(Mexico) Tobis de Acayucan	9	Estadio Universitario Beto Ávila	-	-	Boxscore
Jan 30, 2019	10:00	Leones de León (Nicaragua)	6–1	(Argentina) Falcons de Córdoba	9	Estadio Universitario Beto Ávila	-	-	Boxscore
Jan 30, 2019	14:00	Caimanes de Barranquilla (Colombia)	1–3	(Panama) Toros de Herrera	9	Estadio Universitario Beto Ávila	-	-	Boxscore
Jan 30, 2019	17:00	Leones de León (Nicaragua)	7–5	(Mexico) Tobis de Acayucan	7	Parque Deportivo Colón	-	-	Boxscore
Jan 30, 2019	19:00	Chileros de Xalapa (Mexico)	0–9	(Argentina) Falcons de Córdoba	9	Estadio Universitario Beto Ávila	-	-	Boxscore

== Semifinal ==
Date	Local time	Road team	Score	Home team	Inn.	Venue	Game duration	Attendance	Boxscore
Jan 31, 2019	14:00	Leones de León (Nicaragua)	5–4	(Panama) Toros de Herrera	9	Estadio Universitario Beto Ávila	-	-	Boxscore
Jan 31, 2019	19:00	Tobis de Acayucan (Mexico)	3–0	(Mexico) Chileros de Xalapa	9	Estadio Universitario Beto Ávila	-	-	Boxscore

== Final ==
Date	Local time	Road team	Score	Home team	Inn.	Venue	Game duration	Attendance	Boxscore
Feb 1, 2019	19:00	Tobis de Acayucan (Mexico)	1-3	(Nicaragua) Leones de León		Estadio Universitario Beto Ávila	-	-	
