= 2017 Latin American Series =

Fifth edition of the Latin American baseball series

- League: Latin American Series
- Sport: Baseball
- Duration: January 26 – January 29, 2017
- Games: 7
- Teams: 4
- League champions: (Nicaragua) Tigres de Chinandega
- Runners-up: (Colombia) Leones de Montería

Latin American Series seasons
- ← 2016 2018 →

The 2017 Latin American Series was the fifth edition of the Latin American Series, a baseball sporting event played by the champions of the professional winter leagues that make up the Latin American Professional Baseball Association (ALBP) and the last series containing representatives exclusively from the ALBP's founding nations.

The competition took place at Estadio Dieciocho de Junio in Montería, Colombia from January 26 to January 29, 2017.

== Participating teams ==
League	Team
(Colombia) Colombian Professional Baseball League	Leones de Montería
(Mexico) Veracruz State League	Chileros de Xalapa
(Nicaragua) Nicaraguan Professional Baseball League	Tigres de Chinandega
(Panama) Panamanian Professional Baseball League	Panamá Metro

== Group Phase ==
Pos.	Team	P	W	L	%	Dif
1.	(Nicaragua) Tigres de Chinandega	3	2	1	.667	—
2.	(Colombia) Leones de Montería	3	2	1	.667	—
3.	(Panama) Panamá Metro	3	2	1	.667	—
4.	(Mexico) Chileros de Xalapa	3	0	3	.000	2.0

Qualified for the final
Eliminated

- NOTE: Because first, second and third place were tied, Leones de Montería qualified for the final as the representative of the host nation. Tigres de Chinandega qualified via a random draw.

Date	Local time	Road team	Score	Home team	Inn.	Venue	Game duration	Attendance	Boxscore
Jan 26, 2017	15:00	Chileros de Xalapa (Mexico)	1-3	(Panama) Panamá Metro	9	Estadio Dieciocho de Junio	-	-	
Jan 26, 2017	19:30	Tigres de Chinandega (Nicaragua)	5-2	(Colombia) Leones de Montería	9	Estadio Dieciocho de Junio	-	-	
Jan 27, 2017	15:00	Tigres de Chinandega (Nicaragua)	7-2	(Mexico) Chileros de Xalapa	9	Estadio Dieciocho de Junio	-	-	
Jan 27, 2017	19:30	Panamá Metro (Panama)	1-2	(Colombia) Leones de Montería	9	Estadio Dieciocho de Junio	-	-	
Jan 28, 2017	15:00	Panamá Metro (Panama)	7-5	(Nicaragua) Tigres de Chinandega	9	Estadio Dieciocho de Junio	-	-	
Jan 28, 2017	19:30	Chileros de Xalapa (Mexico)	0-9	(Colombia) Leones de Montería	9	Estadio Dieciocho de Junio	-	-	

== Final ==
January 29 2017, 17:00 Estadio Dieciocho de Junio
Team	1	2	3	4	5	6	7	8	9	R	H	E
(Nicaragua) Tigres de Chinandega	0	0	0	0	1	0	0	3	0	4	10	0
(Colombia) Leones de Montería	0	0	0	0	0	0	0	0	0	0	4	2
WP: Raúl Ruiz (1-0); LP: Javier Ortiz (0-1); Sv: n/a

Boxscore

== Statistics leaders ==
=== Batting ===
Statistic	Name	Total/Avg
Average	(Panama) Anthony Amaya (Metro)	.500
RBIs	(Colombia) Manuel Boscán (Leones) (Netherlands) Dashenko Ricardo (Tigres) (Venezuela) Osman Marval (Tigres) (Nicaragua) Everth Cabrera (Tigres)	3
Home Runs	(Panama) José Camarena (Metro) (Netherlands) Yurendell de Caster (Tigres) (Nicaragua) Everth Cabrera (Tigres) (Colombia) Diover Ávila (Leones) (Colombia) Sneider Batista (Leones)	1
Runs]	(Venezuela) Osman Marval (Tigres)	4
Hits	(Nicaragua) Edgard Montiel (Tigres)	7
Doubles	(Nicaragua) Edgard Montiel (Tigres)	4
Triples	(Netherlands) Dashenko Ricardo (Tigres)	1
Stolen bases	(Netherlands) Dashenko Ricardo (Tigres) (Panama) Eduardo Thomas (Metro) (Nicaragua) Everth Cabrera (Tigres) (Venezuela) Osman Marval (Tigres)	1
SLG	(Colombia) Diover Ávila (Leones)	.750

=== Pitching ===
Statistic	Name	Total/Avg
ERA	(Panama) Davis Romero (Metro)	0.00
Complete Games	(Panama) Davis Romero (Metro) (Dominican Republic) Eulogio de la Cruz (Tigres) (Nicaragua) Mainor Mora (Tigres) (Colombia) Karl Lewis Triana (Leones) (Panama) Isaac Monroy (Metro) (Venezuela) Wilfredo Ramírez (Leones) (Venezuela) Raúl Ruiz (Tigres)	1
Strikeouts	(Panama) Davis Romero (Metro)	10
Saves	(Panama) Jean Corpas (Metro)	2
