= 2016 Latin American Series =

Fourth edition of the Latin American baseball series

- League: Latin American Series
- Sport: Baseball
- Duration: January 26 – January 31, 2016
- Games: 9
- Teams: 4
- League champions: (Nicaragua) Gigantes de Rivas
- Runners-up: (Colombia) Caimanes de Lorica

Latin American Series seasons
- ← 2015 2017 →

The 2016 Latin American Series was the fourth edition of the Latin American Series, a baseball sporting event played by the champions of the professional winter leagues that make up the Latin American Professional Baseball Association (ALBP).

The competition took place at Estadio Stanley Cayasso in Managua, Nicaragua from January 26 to January 31, 2016.

== Participating teams ==
League	Team
(Colombia) Colombian Professional Baseball League	Caimanes de Lorica
(Mexico) Liga Invernal Veracruzana	Tobis de Acayucan
(Nicaragua) Nicaraguan Professional Baseball League	Gigantes de Rivas
(Panama) Panamanian Professional Baseball League	Nacionales de Panamá

== Group Phase ==
Pos.	Team	P	W	L	%	Dif
1.	(Nicaragua) Gigantes de Rivas	3	2	1	.667	—
2.	(Panama) Nacionales de Panamá	3	2	1	.667	—
3.	(Mexico) Tobis de Acayucan	3	1	2	.333	1.0
4.	(Colombia) Caimanes de Lorica	3	1	2	.333	1.0

Qualified for the final
Qualified for the pre-playoff (Game 7)
Qualified for the pre-playoff (Game 8)

- NOTE: Because first and second place were tied, Gigantes de Rivas qualified for the final as the representative of the host nation.

Date	Local time	Road team	Score	Home team	Inn.	Venue	Game duration	Attendance	Boxscore
Jan 26, 2016	13:30	Tobis de Acayucan (Mexico)	9-3	(Colombia) Caimanes de Lorica	9	Estadio Stanley Cayasso	-	-	
Jan 26, 2016	18:30	Nacionales de Panamá (Panama)	6-3	(Nicaragua) Gigantes de Rivas	9	Estadio Stanley Cayasso	-	-	
Jan 27, 2016	13:30	Nacionales de Panamá (Panama)	4-2	(Mexico) Tobis de Acayucan	9	Estadio Stanley Cayasso	-	-	
Jan 27, 2016	18:30	Caimanes de Lorica (Colombia)	1-4	(Nicaragua) Gigantes de Rivas	9	Estadio Stanley Cayasso	-	-	
Jan 28, 2016	14:00	Caimanes de Lorica (Colombia)	4-1	(Panama) Nacionales de Panamá	9	Estadio Yamil Ríos Ugarte	-	-	
Jan 28, 2016	18:30	Tobis de Acayucan (Mexico)	0-1	(Nicaragua) Gigantes de Rivas	9	Estadio Yamil Ríos Ugarte	-	-	

== Playoff Phase ==
=== Pre-playoff (Game 7) ===
January 29, 2016, 18:00 Estadio Stanley Cayasso
Team	1	2	3	4	5	6	7	8	9	R	H	E
(Colombia) Caimanes de Lorica	0	0	0	0	0	0	0	1	0	1	6	0
(Mexico) Tobis de Acayucan	0	0	0	0	0	0	0	0	0	0	5	0
WP: Erick Gonsalvez (1-0); LP: Omar Espinoza (0-1); Sv: Luis Liria (1).

Boxscore

=== Pre-playoff (Game 8) ===
January 30, 2016, 16:00 Estadio Stanley Cayasso
Team	1	2	3	4	5	6	7	8	9	R	H	E
(Colombia) Caimanes de Lorica	0	1	0	0	0	0	0	2	0	3	7	0
(Panama) Nacionales de Panamá	0	0	0	0	0	0	0	0	0	0	5	0
WP: Arismendy Motta (1-0); LP: Davis Romero (0-1); Sv: Luis Liria (2).

Boxscore

== Final ==
January 31, 2016, 16:00 Estadio Nacional Dennis Martínez
Team	1	2	3	4	5	6	7	8	9	R	H	E
(Colombia) Caimanes de Lorica	2	0	0	1	0	0	0	0	0	3	7	3
(Nicaragua) Gigantes de Rivas	0	5	1	0	1	0	0	5	X	12	15	2
WP: Paul Estrada (1-0); LP: Erick Gonsalvez (1-1); Sv: n/a

== Statistics leaders ==
=== Batting ===
Statistic	Name	Total/Avg
Average	(Netherlands) Yurendell de Caster (Gigantes)	.455
RBIs	(Mexico) José Castañeda (Tobis) (Nicaragua) Ofilio Castro (Gigantes)	3
Home Runs	(Panama) Carlos Xavier Quiroz (Nacionales) (Mexico) Karim García (Tobis)	1
Runs	(Nicaragua) Dwight Britton (Gigantes)	4
Hits	(Dominican Republic) Fidel Peña (Caimanes)	10
Doubles	(Venezuela) Gerson Montilla (Caimanes)	3
Triples	(Nicaragua) Ofilio Castro (Gigantes) (Mexico) Karim García (Tobis) (Panama) Jorge Bishop (Nacionales) (Venezuela) Gerson Montilla (Caimanes)	1

=== Pitching ===
Statistic	Name	Total/Avg
ERA	(Mexico) Sergio Lizárraga (Tobis) (Colombia) Ronald Ramírez (Caimanes) (United States) Jonathan Sintes (Tobis) (Colombia) Randy Consuegra (Caimanes) (Dominican Republic) Jonathan Aristil (Gigantes) (Panama) Eliecer Navarro (Nacionales) (Mexico) Jorge Luis Ibarra (Tobis)	0.00
Complete Games	(Mexico) Jasiel Acosta (Tobis) (Dominican Republic) Franquelis Osoria (Nacionales) (Panama) Eliecer Navarro (Nacionales) (Venezuela) Roger Luque (Gigantes) (United States) Charlie Gillies (Caimanes) (Nicaragua) José Villegas (Gigantes) (United States) Erick Gonsalvez (Caimanes) (Dominican Republic) Arismendy Motta (Caimanes) (Venezuela) Paul Estrada (Gigantes)	1
Strikeouts	(Venezuela) Paul Estrada (Gigantes)	11
WHIP	(Panama) Eliecer Navarro (Nacionales)	0.43
Saves	(Dominican Republic) Luis Liria (Caimanes)	2

== Team of the tournament ==
Position	Player
C	(Colombia) Luis Allen (MVP) (Gigantes)
1B	(Panama) Carlos Xavier Quiroz (Nacionales)
2B	(Nicaragua) Jimmy González (Gigantes)
3B	(Mexico) José Castañeda (Tobis)
SS	(Panama) Eduardo Thomas (Nacionales)
OF	(Dominican Republic) Fidel Peña (Caimanes)
OF	(Colombia) Efraín Contreras (Caimanes)
OF	(Mexico) Karim García (Tobis)
P	(Colombia) Ronald Ramírez (Caimanes)
