= Latin American Series =

Baseball competition

- Sport: Baseball
- Founded: 2013
- Folded: 2019
- Countries: Argentina; Colombia; Curaçao; Mexico; Nicaragua; Panama
- Last champions: (Nicaragua) Leones de León (1st title)
- Most titles: (Nicaragua) Tigres de Chinandega (2 titles)
- Related competitions: Intercontinental Series

The Latin American Series (Spanish: Serie Latinoamericana) was an annual baseball competition contested by the champions of the professional baseball winter leagues in Latin America and the Caribbean. The tournament was organized by the Latin American Professional Baseball Association (ALBP) as an alternative to the Caribbean Series.

The first winner of the series was Mexico's Brujos de Los Tuxtlas, who beat the Tigres de Chinandega of Nicaragua in 2013. The last winner was Nicaragua's Leones de León, which defeated Mexico's Tobis de Acayucan in 2019. Tigres de Chinandega were the most successful team, with two titles in three appearances.

== History ==
On February 10, 2012, the then president of the Colombian Professional Baseball League, together with executives of Liga Invernal Veracruzana, organized the Mexico-Colombia International Baseball Series between the champions of both competitions, where the Colombian champions, Toros de Sincelejo and Veracruz champions, Brujos de Los Tuxtlas, met in a 3-game series at Estadio Once de Noviembre in Cartagena, Colombia, with the Colombian outfit winning two games to one.

In the case of Mexico, the representative is the champion of Liga Invernal Veracruzana. Often, teams who qualify for this competition receive loan players from other teams in their respective leagues in order to improve their country's chance of winning.

With the creation of the Latin American Professional Baseball Association in late-2012, the idea of creating a series that would integrate Latin American professional baseball teams materialised. As a result, the first Latin American Series was held from February 1 to 4, 2013 in Veracruz, Mexico. The first five editions of the series only contained teams from Colombia, Nicaragua, Mexico and Panama until the first expansion of the competition in 2018. This expansion included Curaçao, who had just created a professional league, followed by Argentina in 2019, with the intention of inviting Chile once a professional league is set up.

The rules of the competition were based on those of the World Baseball Classic. Teams wore their respective national team uniforms, rather than their own professional uniforms.

The impetus for the Latin American Series eventually faded with the expansion of the Caribbean Series to non-members of the Caribbean Professional Baseball Confederation (CPBC). Panama, which was scheduled to host the 2020 edition, withdrew from the competition after being invited to the 2019 and 2020 Caribbean Series. On January 12, 2020, the ALBP confirmed the suspension of the 2020 edition. Colombia would also be invited to the 2020 Caribbean Series, as would Curaçao to the 2023 edition, thus making the Latin American Series moot.

== Leagues participating ==
Country	League	First edition	Latest edition
Argentina	Argentine Baseball League	2019	
Colombia	Colombian Professional Baseball League	2013	2019
Curaçao	Curaçao National Championship AA League	2018	
Mexico	Liga Invernal Veracruzana	2013	2019
Mexico	Veracruz State League	2017	2018
Nicaragua	Nicaraguan Professional Baseball League	2013	2019
Panama	Panamanian Professional Baseball League	2013	2019

== Series ==
Year	Host city	Champions	Result	Runners up	Head Coach
2013	(Mexico) Veracruz	(Mexico) Brujos de Los Tuxtlas	1-0	(Nicaragua) Tigres de Chinandega	(Mexico) Pedro Meré
2014	(Colombia) Montería	(Colombia) Tigres de Cartagena	9-1	(Mexico) Brujos de Los Tuxtlas	(Venezuela) Donaldo Méndez
2015	Panama City	(Colombia) Leones de Montería	1-0	(Panama) Caballos de Coclé	(Colombia) Luis Urueta
2016	(Nicaragua) Managua	(Nicaragua) Gigantes de Rivas	12-3	(Colombia) Caimanes de Lorica	(Cuba) Germán Mesa
2017	(Colombia) Montería	(Nicaragua) Tigres de Chinandega	4-0	(Colombia) Leones de Montería	(Panama) Lenin Picota
2018	(Nicaragua) Managua	(Nicaragua) Tigres de Chinandega	9-1	(Mexico) Tobis de Acayucan	(Panama) Lenin Picota
2019	(Mexico) Veracruz	(Nicaragua) Leones de León	3-1	(Mexico) Tobis de Acayucan	(Nicaragua) Sandor Guido
2020	Panama City	Cancelled			

== Championships by team ==
Team	Wins	Years
(Nicaragua) Tigres de Chinandega	2	2017, 2018
(Mexico) Brujos de Los Tuxtlas	1	2013
(Colombia) Tigres de Cartagena	1	2014
(Colombia) Leones de Montería	1	2015
(Nicaragua) Gigantes de Rivas	1	2016
(Nicaragua) Leones de León	1	2019

== Championships by nation ==
Team	Wins	Years
Nicaragua	4	2016, 2017, 2018, 2019
Colombia	2	2014, 2015
Mexico	1	2013

== All-time table ==
=== By team ===
Pos.	Team	Apps.	P	W	L	%	Last App.	Best result
1.	(Nicaragua) Leones de León	1	7	7	0	1.000	2019	Champions (2019)
2.	(Nicaragua) Tigres de Chinandega	3	11	9	2	.818	2018	Champions (2017, 2018)
3.	(Colombia) Leones de Montería	2	9	6	3	.667	2017	Champions (2015)
4.	(Panama) Panamá Metro	1	3	2	1	.667	2017	Group Phase (2017)
5.	(Colombia) Tigres de Cartagena	1	5	3	2	.600	2014	Champions (2014)
6.	(Mexico) Brujos de Los Tuxtlas	3	11	6	5	.545	2015	Champions (2013)
7.	(Nicaragua) Gigantes de Rivas	2	8	4	4	.500	2016	Champions (2016)
8.	(Panama) Nacionales de Panamá	1	4	2	2	.500	2016	Third place (2016)
9.	(Nicaragua) Indios del Bóer	1	4	2	2	.500	2015	Third place (2015)
10.	(Mexico) Tobis de Acayucan	3	16	7	9	.438	2019	Runners-up (2018, 2019)
11.	(Panama) Caballos de Coclé	2	7	3	4	.429	2015	Runners-up (2015)
12.	(Argentina) Falcons de Córdoba	1	5	2	3	.400	2019	Group Phase (2019)
13.	(Panama) Indios de Urracá	1	5	2	3	.400	2014	Third place (2014)
14.	(Mexico) Chileros de Xalapa	2	9	3	6	.333	2019	Semi-finals (2019)
15.	(Panama) Toros de Herrera	1	6	2	4	.333	2019	Semi-finals (2019)
16.	(Colombia) Caimanes de Barranquilla	3	13	4	9	.308	2019	Runners-up (2016)
17.	(Curaçao) Wildcats KJ74	1	4	1	3	.250	2018	Third place (2018)
18.	(Panama) Bravos de Urracá	1	3	0	3	.000	2018	Group Phase (2018)

=== By nation ===
Pos.	Team	Apps.	P	W	L	%	Best result
1.	Nicaragua	7	30	22	8	.733	Champions (2016, 2017, 2018,2019)
2.	Colombia	6	27	13	14	.481	Champions (2014, 2015)
3.	Mexico	7	36	16	20	.444	Champions (2013)
4.	Argentina	1	5	2	3	.400	Group Phase (2019)
5.	Panama	7	28	11	17	.393	Runners-up (2015)
6.	Curaçao	1	4	1	3	.250	Third place (2018)

== Television rights ==
Year	Network(s)
2013	(Mexico) RTV
2014, 2016	(Mexico) Claro Sports
2015	(Panama) TVMax
2017	(United States) YouTube
2018	Viva Nicaragua
2019	(Mexico) TVMÁS

== See also ==
- Caribbean Series
- Serie de las Américas
- Interamerican Series
- Latin American Series (1952), a national team tournament held in Caracas
- Asia Series
- European Cup
- Baseball awards#Americas
