= Édinson Rentería =

Colombian baseball player and executive

- Infielder / manager
- Born: April 7, 1968 (age 57); Barranquilla, Colombia
- Batted: Right Threw: Right

CPBL debut
- May 9, 1992, for the Brother Elephants

Last CPBL appearance
- August 19, 1992, for the Brother Elephants

CPBL statistics
- Batting average: .239
- Hits: 16
- Home runs: 0
- Stats at Baseball Reference

Teams
- Brother Elephants (1992)

Édinson Rafael Rentería Herazo (born April 7, 1968) is a Colombian professional baseball executive and former player and manager. Originally signed by the Houston Astros organization, he played one season with the Brother Elephants of the Chinese Professional Baseball League, and with several teams in the Mexican League.

Rentería was previously the president of the Colombian Professional Baseball League. He also owns two teams in the league, the Leones de Barranquilla and the Tigres de Cartagena. Since 2025, he has served on the board of the Colombian Baseball Federation.

== Playing career ==
Born in Barranquilla, Colombia, Rentería's two brothers, Evert and Édgar Rentería, also played affiliated baseball, with Édgar eventually debuting with the Florida Marlins. As a youth, Édinson Rentería worked as a street vendor to support his family. He signed with the Houston Astros, debuting with the Gulf Coast Astros in 1985. He made it as high as Triple-A, posting a .291/.339/.336 slash line with the Tucson Toros of the Pacific Coast League in 1990. In 1991, his final season with the Astros organization, he split time between Double-A Jackson and High-A Osceola, combining for a .283 average.

Rentería went to the Chinese Professional Baseball League in 1992, appearing in 27 games for the Brother Elephants and posting a .239/.316/.284 slash line. The next year, he signed with the expansion Florida Marlins, again reaching the Triple-A level with the Edmonton Trappers, where he hit .265. After leaving the Marlins organization, he went to the Mexican League, where he played with the Tigres Capitalinos, hitting .335 in 1994, and the Piratas de Campeche and El Águila de Veracruz, where hi hit .300 in 1995.

== Post-playing career ==
Rentería managed the Caimanes de Barranquilla of the Colombian Professional Baseball League (LCBP) to two league championships in 1998 and 1999. He assumed ownership of the league control over day-to-day operations in 1998, with an eye towards attracting foreign import players and combating the country's negative perception due to the Colombian drug wars.

As president of the LCBP, Rentería helped organize the inaugural Latin American Series, an alternative club competition to the Caribbean Series, in 2013. He also attempted to organize the Intercontinental Series, another alternative to the Caribbean Series to be held in 2024, though that tournament was ultimately cancelled after the Colombian government withdrew its support.

In 2012, Rentería was general manager for the Colombia national baseball team during the qualifiers for the 2013 World Baseball Classic.

Rentería's management of the LCBP was controversial, and characterized by conflict with other owners such as Orlando Cabrera. He was eventually replaced as the league's administrator by Pedro Salcedo Salom in 2022. Even after his tenure, Rentería has been criticized by players such as Jordan Díaz who accused Rentería of "defrauding" the country's baseball program. Rentería responded by saying he would take legal action against Díaz. He was also criticized for failing to make payments to players of the Leones de Barranquilla in 2025; he defended himself by saying that the ownership group of Tigres de Cartagena had failed to make contractually-obligated payments to him.

In 2025, Rentería was elected vice president of the Colombian Baseball Federation.
