= 2015 Latin American Series =

Third edition of the Latin American baseball series

- League: Latin American Series
- Sport: Baseball
- Duration: January 27 – February 1, 2015
- Games: 8
- Teams: 4
- League champions: (Colombia) Leones de Montería
- Runners-up: (Panama) Caballos de Coclé

Latin American Series seasons
- ← 2014 2016 →

The 2015 Latin American Series was the third edition of the Latin American Series, a baseball sporting event played by the champions of the professional winter leagues that make up the Latin American Professional Baseball Association (ALBP).

The competition took place at Estadio Nacional de Panamá in Panama City from January 27 to February 1, 2015.

== Participating teams ==
League	Team
(Colombia) Colombian Professional Baseball League	Leones de Montería
(Mexico) Liga Invernal Veracruzana	Brujos de San Andrés Tuxtla
(Nicaragua) Nicaraguan Professional Baseball League	Indios del Bóer
(Panama) Panamanian Professional Baseball League	Caballos de Coclé

== Group Phase ==
Pos.	Team	P	W	L	%	Dif
1.	(Panama) Caballos de Coclé	3	2	1	.667	—
2.	(Nicaragua) Indios del Bóer	3	2	1	.667	—
3.	(Colombia) Leones de Montería	3	2	1	.667	—
4.	(Mexico) Brujos de San Andrés Tuxtla	3	0	3	.333	2.0

Qualified for the final
Qualified for the semi-final
Eliminated

Date	Local time	Road team	Score	Home team	Inn.	Venue	Game duration	Attendance	Boxscore
Jan 27, 2015	15:00	Brujos de San Andrés Tuxtla (Mexico)	6-8	(Colombia) Leones de Montería	9	Estadio Nacional de Panamá	-	-	
Jan 27, 2015	19:30	Indios del Bóer (Nicaragua)	4-5	(Panama) Caballos de Coclé	9	Estadio Nacional de Panamá	-	-	
Jan 28, 2015	15:00	Indios del Bóer (Nicaragua)	4-3	(Mexico) Brujos de San Andrés Tuxtla	9	Estadio Nacional de Panamá	-	-	
Jan 28, 2015	19:30	Leones de Montería (Colombia)	3-2	(Panama) Caballos de Coclé	9	Estadio Nacional de Panamá	-	-	
Jan 29, 2015	15:00	Leones de Montería (Colombia)	3-5	(Nicaragua) Indios del Bóer	9	Estadio Remón Cantera	-	-	
Jan 29, 2015	19:30	Brujos de San Andrés Tuxtla (Mexico)	4-6	(Panama) Caballos de Coclé	9	Estadio Remón Cantera	-	-	

== Semi-final ==
January 31, 2015, 19:30 Estadio Nacional de Panamá
Team	1	2	3	4	5	6	7	8	9	R	H	E
(Colombia) Leones de Montería	0	1	0	0	4	0	0	5	0	10	15	0
(Nicaragua) Indios del Bóer	0	0	0	0	0	0	0	0	0	0	5	3
WP: Randy Consuegra (1-0); LP: Rodney Rodríguez (0-1); Sv: n/a

== Final ==
February 1, 2015, 19:30 Estadio Nacional de Panamá
Team	1	2	3	4	5	6	7	8	9	R	H	E
(Panama) Caballos de Coclé	0	0	0	0	0	0	0	0	0	0	3	2
(Colombia) Leones de Montería	0	0	0	0	0	0	0	0	1	1	4	0
WP: Tomás Cabaniel (1-0); LP: Davis Romero (0-1); Sv: n/a

== Leaders ==
=== Batting ===
Statistic	Name	Total/Avg
Average	(Mexico) Oswaldo Morejón (Brujos)	.500
RBIs	(Mexico) Rogelio Noris (Brujos)	5
Home Runs	(Colombia) Reynaldo Rodríguez (Leones) (Dominican Republic) Jesús Valdez (Indios)	2
Runs	(United States) Stewart James (Leones)	5
Hits	(Dominican Republic) Eudy Piña (Leones) (Dominican Republic) Fidel Peña (Leones)	7
Doubles	(Nicaragua) Jimmy González (Indios)	3
Triples	(Dominican Republic) Andy Vázquez (Leones) (United States) Stewart James (Leones)	1

=== Pitching ===
Statistic	Name	Total/Avg
ERA	(Mexico) Cupertino León (Brujos) (Dominican Republic) Gustavo Martínez (Indios) (Panama) Davis Romero (Caballos) (Colombia) Javier Ortiz (Leones) (Panama) Alberto Baldonado (Caballos) (Colombia) Randy Consuegra (Leones) (Mexico) Heberto González (Brujos)	0.00
Complete Games	(Venezuela) José Escalona (Indios) (Panama) Alberto Baldonado (Caballos) (Venezuela) Paul Estrada (Indios) (Colombia) Randy Consuegra (Leones) (Dominican Republic) Luis Liria (Leones) (Panama) José Corrales (Caballos) (Dominican Republic) Daniel López (Leones) (Venezuela) Tomás Cabaniel (Leones)	1
Strikeouts	(Panama) Davis Romero (Caballos)	11
WHIP	(Panama) Alberto Baldonado (Caballos)	0.43
Saves	(Nicaragua) Pedro Wilder Rayo (Indios) (Panama) Antonio Cuan (Caballos) (Nicaragua) Jorge Bucardo (Indios) (Dominican Republic) Luis Liria (Leones)	1
