= Tigres de Cartagena =

Colombian baseball team

- Logo

Information
- League: Colombian Professional Baseball League
- Location: Cartagena, Colombia
- Ballpark: Estadio Once de Noviembre
- Founded: 1994
- Latin American Series championships: 2014
- League championships: 6 (1995-96, 2003-04, 2004-05, 2005-06, 2006-07, 2013-14)
- Colors: Red, White
- Ownership: Team Rentería USA
- President: Nabil Baladi
- Manager: Ronald Ramírez

Current uniforms
Home	Away

The Tigres de Cartagena (Cartagena Tigers) are a baseball team in the Colombian Professional Baseball League (LPB), playing in the Caribbean city of Cartagena de Indias. The team was founded in 1996 and plays at the Estadio Once de Noviembre. Its main rival is Caimanes, which plays in neighboring Barranquilla.

Several Colombian MLB players have played for Tigres, including Gio Urshela, Harold Ramírez, Meibrys Viloria, and brothers Jolbert and Orlando Cabrera. For a time, the team was managed by former MLB All-Star Bill Madlock.

In 2014, the team made history by winning the first international club title for Colombia, defeating Mexico's Brujos de Los Tuxtlas in the Latin American Series.

== History ==
=== Predecessors ===
Two teams represented Cartagena during the first era (1948–1958) of professional baseball in Colombia: the Indios de Cartagena and the Torices de Cartagena. Torices, named after the neighborhood in Cartagena, gained the nickname Tigres del Torices devised by sportswriter Justiniano Martínez. The team was managed by Pepín Pérez and then by Pedro Pagés, the latter of whom led Torices to a championship. Other players included Gaspar del Monte and Rogelio Martínez, and Willie Tasby. The club was bought by Kola Román in 1955 and became Tigres de Kola Román. As Kola Román, the club won another championship under Frank Scalzi in 1957, with a roster of Yankees imports such as Ken Guettler and Lloyd Merritt.

Torices returned for the second era of professional baseball, starting in 1979. In the 1979–80 season, it was managed by future Hall-of-Famer Tony Oliva. They were skippered by Enrique Izquierdo in 1980–81, and by Carlos Alfonso in 1981–82.

=== Modern franchise ===
The modern incarnation of the Tigres were founded by Orlando Vélez Benedetti in 1994. The team reached its first title in the 1995-96 season, under the management of Jolbert Cabrera Sr., and with his two sons Jolbert and Orlando on the roster.

Édinson Rentería, brother of Barranquilla-born major leaguer Édgar Rentería, bought the team in 2003. Tigres again won the championship in the 2003-04 season, under the direction of Bill Madlock (a previous four-time batting champion in LPB), beating Leones de Cartagena in the final play off. They repeated this feat in 2004-05, 2005-06, and 2006-07, defeating Caimanes de Barranquilla in three straight finals.

Tigres would not win another title until 2013-14. Afterwards, the team made history by winning the first title of the Latin American Series for Colombian baseball, defeating Brujos de Los Tuxtlas of Mexico's Veracruz Winter League in the final play-off by 9-1.

Tigres did not play in the 2016-17 tournament, when they were replaced by Indios de Cartagena, but returned in the 2017-18 season.

Under Rentería's ownership, the management of the team has been periodically leased out to other ownership groups. In 2025, the management group was criticized for failing to pay the team's players on time, as many reported not having received their salaries months after the season's end. Also in 2025, it was reported that a group of Cartagena businessmen were interested in purchasing the team from Rentería, which would be the first local ownership in nearly two decades.

== Championships ==
Season	Manager	Record	Series score	Runner-up
1995–96	Jolbert Cabrera Sr.	23–24	4–2	Caimanes de Barranquilla
2003–04	Bill Madlock	16–14	4–1	Leones de Montería
2004–05	Bill Madlock	13–17	4–3	Toros de Sincelejo
2005–06	Neder Horta	17–13	4–1	Caimanes de Barranquilla
2006–07	Neder Horta	28–26	4–0	Caimanes de Barranquilla
2013–14	Donaldo Méndez	32–9	4–1	Leones de Montería
Total championships			6	

== Roster ==
Tigres de Cartagena roster – 2025–26 LPB playoffs
Active roster		Coaches
Pitchers: -- (Colombia) Julio Teherán; -- (Colombia) Guillo Zuñiga; -- (Colombia) Ronald Ramírez; -- (Venezuela) Álvaro Seijas; -- (Dominican Republic) Alan Perdomo; -- (Colombia) Randy Cuentas; -- (Venezuela) Luis Arejula; -- (Venezuela) Mayckol Guaipe; -- (Colombia) Julio Vivas; -- (Venezuela) Yoimer Camacho; 18 (Cuba) Amaury Tamayo; 19 (Colombia) Yeizer Marrugo; 40 (Dominican Republic) Deivy Mendez; 41 (Venezuela) Jeferson Villabona; 51 (Panama) Gilberto Chu; 66 (Colombia) Alberto Vega; 94 (Colombia) Juan Olmos; 99 (Colombia) Erling Moreno	Catchers: -- (Colombia) Daniel Vellojín; -- (Colombia) Guillermo Quintana; -- (Colombia) Ronaldo Hernández; 72 (Colombia) Meibrys Viloria; Infielders: -- (Dominican Republic) Michael de León; -- (Colombia) Dayan Frias; 4 (Colombia) Nolan Beltran; 12 (Colombia) Santiago Vargas; 29 (Colombia) Gio Urshela; Outfielders: -- (Colombia) Tito Polo; -- (Dominican Republic) Imanol Vargas; -- (Venezuela) Lorenzo Cedrola; 32 (Venezuela) Jorge Burgos; 86 (Colombia) Jhosman Theran; 88 (Dominican Republic) Jesús Valdez	Manager: (Colombia) Neder Horta; Coaches: (Colombia) Brallan Perez; (Colombia) Jhonatan Lozada; (Colombia) Álvaro Julio; (Colombia) Ali Valdelamar; (Colombia) Rodrigo Escobar; Roster updated on 12 December 2026

== Notable players ==
- Orlando Cabrera
- Jolbert Cabrera
- Jhonatan Solano
- Gio Urshela
- Guillermo Zuñiga
- Meibrys Viloria
- Adrián Sánchez
