= 2018 Latin American Series =

Sixth edition of the Latin American baseball series

- League: Latin American Series
- Sport: Baseball
- Duration: January 26 – January 31, 2018
- Games: 8
- Teams: 4
- League champions: (Nicaragua) Tigres de Chinandega
- Runners-up: (Mexico) Tobis de Acayucan

Latin American Series seasons
- ← 2017 2019 →

The 2018 Latin American Series was the sixth edition of the Latin American Series, a baseball sporting event played by the champions of the professional winter leagues that make up the Latin American Professional Baseball Association (ALBP) and the first series containing representatives from outside the ALBP's founding nations.

The competition took place at the Dennis Martínez National Stadium in Managua, Nicaragua from January 26 to January 31, 2018.

== Qualified teams ==
| League | Team |
|---|---|
| (Argentina) Argentine Baseball League | Infernales de Salta |
| (Chile) Chilean Organized Baseball League | Rangers de Santiago |
| (Colombia) Colombian Professional Baseball League | Leones de Montería |
| Curaçao National Championship AA League | WildCats KJ74 |
| (Mexico) Veracruz State League | Tobis de Acayucan |
| (Nicaragua) Nicaraguan Professional Baseball League | Tigres de Chinandega |
| (Panama) Panamanian Professional Baseball League | Caballos de Coclé |
| (Panama) Panamanian Professional Baseball League | Bravos de Urracá |

- Teams highlighted in red withdrew from the competition. Due to economic issues surrounding their respective leagues, both the Argentinian and Chilean representatives decided not to participate in this edition. Leones de Montería and Caballos de Coclé boycotted the competition, with Leones withdrawing due to a dispute over missing prize money from their Latin American Series win in 2015, and Caballos after failing to come to an agreement with ALBP over salaries. Bravos de Urracá (highlighted in green), who came second in the Panamanian Professional Baseball League, were called in as the replacement representative for Panama.

== Group Phase ==
| Pos. | Team | P | W | L | % | Dif |
|---|---|---|---|---|---|---|
| 1. | (Nicaragua) Tigres de Chinandega | 3 | 3 | 0 | 1.000 | — |
| 2. | (Mexico) Tobis de Acayucan | 3 | 2 | 1 | .667 | 1.0 |
| 3. | (Curaçao) WildCats KJ74 | 3 | 1 | 2 | .333 | 2.0 |
| 4. | (Panama) Bravos de Urracá | 3 | 0 | 3 | .000 | 3.0 |

| Qualified for the final |
| Qualified for the semi-final |
| Eliminated |

| Date | Local time | Road team | Score | Home team | Inn. | Venue | Game duration | Attendance | Boxscore |
|---|---|---|---|---|---|---|---|---|---|
| Jan 26, 2018 | 13:00 | WildCats KJ74 (Curaçao) | 7-6 | (Panama) Bravos de Urracá | 9 | Dennis Martínez National Stadium | - | - | |
| Jan 26, 2018 | 18:30 | Tobis de Acayucan (Mexico) | 5-10 | (Nicaragua) Tigres de Chinandega | 9 | Dennis Martínez National Stadium | - | - | |
| Jan 27, 2018 | 13:00 | Tobis de Acayucan (Mexico) | 12-9 | (Curaçao) WildCats KJ74 | 9 | Dennis Martínez National Stadium | - | - | |
| Jan 27, 2018 | 18:30 | Bravos de Urracá (Panama) | 4-6 | (Nicaragua) Tigres de Chinandega | 9 | Dennis Martínez National Stadium | - | - | |
| Jan 28, 2018 | 13:00 | Bravos de Urracá (Panama) | 2-7 | (Mexico) Tobis de Acayucan | 9 | Dennis Martínez National Stadium | - | - | |
| Jan 28, 2018 | 18:30 | WildCats KJ74 (Curaçao) | 5-6 | (Nicaragua) Tigres de Chinandega | 11 | Dennis Martínez National Stadium | - | - | |

== Semi-final ==
January 30, 2018, 18:30 Dennis Martínez National Stadium
| Team | 1 | 2 | 3 | 4 | 5 | 6 | 7 | 8 | 9 | R | H | E |
|---|---|---|---|---|---|---|---|---|---|---|---|---|
| (Curaçao) WildCats KJ74 | 0 | 1 | 0 | 1 | 0 | 1 | 0 | 0 | 0 | 3 | 6 | 2 |
| (Mexico) Tobis de Acayucan | 4 | 0 | 0 | 0 | 1 | 3 | 1 | 0 | X | 9 | 12 | 1 |
WP: José Miguel Piña (1-1); LP: Cerilio Soleana (0-1); Sv: n/a Home runs: WIL: None; TOB: Yadil Mujica (1).

== Final ==
January 31, 2018, 18:30 Estadio Nacional Dennis Martínez
| Team | 1 | 2 | 3 | 4 | 5 | 6 | 7 | 8 | 9 | R | H | E |
|---|---|---|---|---|---|---|---|---|---|---|---|---|
| (Mexico) Tobis de Acayucan | 0 | 0 | 0 | 0 | 0 | 0 | 1 | 0 | 0 | 1 | 6 | 0 |
| (Nicaragua) Tigres de Chinandega | 0 | 3 | 2 | 0 | 0 | 0 | 0 | 4 | X | 9 | 13 | 3 |
WP: Marcos Frías (2-0); LP: Jorge Luis Ibarra (0-1); Sv: n/a Home runs: TOB: None; TIG: Jamar Walton (3).

== Statistics leaders ==
=== Batting ===
| Statistic | Player | Total/Avg |
|---|---|---|
| Average | (Netherlands) Rojean Cleofa (Wildcats) | .667 |
| RBIs | (Nicaragua) Leonardo Ortiz (Tigres) | 5 |
| Home Runs | (Nicaragua) Leonardo Ortiz (Tigres) (United States) Jamar Walton (Tigres) | 2 |
| Runs | (Dominican Republic) Juan Díaz (Bravos) | 5 |
| Hits | (Netherlands) Rojean Cleofa (Wildcats) | 8 |
| Doubles | (Netherlands) Rojean Cleofa (Wildcats) (Mexico) Eliseo Aldazaba (Tobis) (Nicaragua) Edgard Montiel (Tigres) (Netherlands) Yurendell de Caster (Wildcats) | 2 |
| Triples | (United States) Jamar Walton (Tigres) (Nicaragua) Elmer Reyes (Tigres) | 1 |
| Stolen bases | (Mexico) Enrique Osorio (Tobis) (Cuba) Yadil Mujica (Tobis) | 2 |
| SLG | (United States) Jamar Walton (Tigres) | 1.222 |

=== Pitching ===
| Statistic | Player | Total/Avg |
|---|---|---|
| ERA | (Mexico) Alberto Leyva (Tobis) (Dominican Republic) Sammy Taveras (Bravos) (Nicaragua) Wilber Bucardo (Tigres) (Nicaragua) Fidencio Flores (Tigres) | 0.00 |
| Complete Games | (Netherlands) Diegomar Markwell (Wildcats) (Dominican Republic) Marcos Frías (Tigres) (Mexico) Alberto Leyva (Tobis) (Venezuela) Raúl Ruiz (Tigres) (Dominican Republic) Gilberto Méndez (Tobis) (Nicaragua) Nelson León (Tigres) | 1 |
| Strikeouts | (Venezuela) Raúl Ruiz (Tigres) (Nicaragua) Wilton López (Tigres) (Dominican Republic) Gilberto Méndez (Tobis) | 6 |
| Saves | (Netherlands) Shairon Martis (Wildcats) (Nicaragua) Wilber Bucardo (Tigres) | 1 |
