= 2013 Latin American Series =

First edition of the Latin American baseball series

- League: Latin American Series
- Sport: Baseball
- Duration: February 1 – February 4, 2013
- Number of games: 6
- Number of teams: 4
- League champions: (Mexico) Brujos de Los Tuxtlas
- Runners-up: (Nicaragua) Tigres de Chinandega

Latin American Series seasons
- ← none 2014 →

The 2013 Latin American Series was the first edition of the Latin American Series, a baseball sporting event played by the champions of the professional winter leagues that make up the Latin American Professional Baseball Association (ALBP).

The competition took place at Estadio Universitario Beto Ávila in Veracruz, Mexico from February 1 to 4, 2013.

== Participating teams ==
League	Team
(Colombia) Colombian Professional Baseball League	Caimanes de Barranquilla
(Mexico) Liga Invernal Veracruzana	Brujos de Los Tuxtlas
(Nicaragua) Nicaraguan Professional Baseball League	Tigres de Chinandega
(Panama) Panamanian Professional Baseball League	Caballos de Coclé

== Tournament Bracket ==
Preliminaries
–	(Panama) Caballos	4
–	(Colombia) Caimanes	2
–	(Nicaragua) Tigres	4
–	(Mexico) Brujos	0
Lower round 1
L1	(Colombia) Caimanes	1
L2	(Mexico) Brujos	3

Semi-finals
W1	(Panama) Caballos	1
W2	(Nicaragua) Tigres	7
Lower final
W3	(Mexico) Brujos	7
L4	(Panama) Caballos	0

Final
W4	(Nicaragua) Tigres	0
W5	(Mexico) Brujos	1

== Results ==
=== Preliminaries ===
Date	Local time	Road team	Score	Home team	Inn.	Venue	Game duration	Attendance	Boxscore
Feb 1, 2013	15:00	Caballos de Coclé (Panama)	4-2	(Colombia) Caimanes de Barranquilla	9	Estadio Universitario Beto Ávila	-	-	Boxscore
Feb 1, 2013	20:00	Tigres de Chinandega (Nicaragua)	4-0	(Mexico) Brujos de Los Tuxtlas	9	Estadio Universitario Beto Ávila	-	-	Boxscore
Feb 2, 2013	15:00	Caimanes de Barranquilla (Colombia)	1–3	(Mexico) Brujos de Los Tuxtlas	9	Estadio Universitario Beto Ávila	-	-	Boxscore

=== Semi-finals ===
Date	Local time	Road team	Score	Home team	Inn.	Venue	Game duration	Attendance	Boxscore
Feb 2, 2013	20:00	Caballos de Coclé (Panama)	1-7	(Nicaragua) Tigres de Chinandega	9	Estadio Universitario Beto Ávila	-	-	Boxscore
Feb 3, 2013	18:00	Brujos de Los Tuxtlas (Mexico)	7-0	(Panama) Caballos de Coclé	9	Estadio Universitario Beto Ávila	-	-	Boxscore

=== Final ===
Date	Local time	Road team	Score	Home team	Inn.	Venue	Game duration	Attendance	Boxscore
Feb 4, 2013	20:00	Tigres de Chinandega (Nicaragua)	0-1	(Mexico) Brujos de Los Tuxtlas	9	Estadio Universitario Beto Ávila	-	-	Boxscore
