= 2014 Latin American Series =

Second edition of the Latin American baseball series

- League: Latin American Series
- Sport: Baseball
- Duration: January 28 – February 1, 2014
- Games: 9
- Teams: 4
- League champions: (Colombia) Tigres de Cartagena
- Runners-up: (Mexico) Brujos de Los Tuxtlas

Latin American Series seasons
- ← 2013 2015 →

The 2014 Latin American Series was the second edition of the Latin American Series, a baseball sporting event played by the champions of the professional winter leagues that make up the Latin American Professional Baseball Association (ALBP).

The competition took place at Estadio Dieciocho de Junio in Montería, Colombia from January 28 to February 1, 2014.

== Participating teams ==
League	Team
(Colombia) Colombian Professional Baseball League	Tigres de Cartagena
(Mexico) Liga Invernal Veracruzana	Brujos de Los Tuxtlas
(Nicaragua) Nicaraguan Professional Baseball League	Gigantes de Rivas
(Panama) Panamanian Professional Baseball League	Indios de Urracá

== Group Phase ==
Pos.	Team	P	W	L	%	Dif
1.	(Mexico) Brujos de Los Tuxtlas	3	3	0	1.000	—
2.	(Colombia) Tigres de Cartagena	3	1	2	.333	2.0
3.	(Panama) Indios de Urracá	3	1	2	.333	2.0
4.	(Nicaragua) Gigantes de Rivas	3	1	2	.333	2.0

Qualified for the final
Qualified for the pre-playoff (Game 7)
Qualified for the pre-playoff (Game 8)

Date	Local time	Road team	Score	Home team	Inn.	Venue	Game duration	Attendance	Boxscore
Jan 28, 2014	15:00	Indios de Urracá (Panama)	15-13	(Nicaragua) Gigantes de Rivas	9	Estadio Dieciocho de Junio	-	-	
Jan 28, 2014	20:00	Brujos de Los Tuxtlas (Mexico)	6-1	(Colombia) Tigres de Cartagena	9	Estadio Dieciocho de Junio	-	-	
Jan 29, 2014	15:00	Gigantes de Rivas (Nicaragua)	7-8	(Mexico) Brujos de Los Tuxtlas	9	Estadio Dieciocho de Junio	-	-	
Jan 29, 2014	19:30	Indios de Urracá (Panama)	1-9	(Colombia) Tigres de Cartagena	9	Estadio Dieciocho de Junio	-	-	
Jan 30, 2014	15:00	Brujos de Los Tuxtlas (Mexico)	9-3	(Panama) Indios de Urracá	9	Estadio Dieciocho de Junio	-	-	
Jan 30, 2014	19:30	Gigantes de Rivas (Nicaragua)	8-4	(Colombia) Tigres de Cartagena	9	Estadio Dieciocho de Junio	-	-	

== Playoff Phase ==
Because second to fourth place in the group phase were tied, teams drew straws to determine second place and therefore the team who would qualify for Game 8.

=== Pre-playoff (Game 7) ===
January 31, 2014, 15:00 Estadio Dieciocho de Junio
Team	1	2	3	4	5	6	7	R	H	E
(Nicaragua) Gigantes de Rivas	3	0	0	1	0	1	0	5	8	1
(Panama) Indios de Urracá	1	1	0	2	3	3	X	10	16	2
WP: Abdiel Velásquez (1-0); LP: Elvin Orozco (0-1); Sv: n/a

=== Pre-playoff (Game 8) ===
January 31, 2014, 19:00 Estadio Dieciocho de Junio
Team	1	2	3	4	5	6	7	R	H	E
(Panama) Indios de Urracá	0	0	0	0	1	0	0	1	5	2
(Colombia) Tigres de Cartagena	0	0	3	0	2	1	X	6	7	0
WP: Ronald Ramírez (1-0); LP: Alcibiades González (0-1); Sv: n/a

== Final ==
February 1, 2014, 19:00 Estadio Dieciocho de Junio
Team	1	2	3	4	5	6	7	8	9	R	H	E
(Colombia) Tigres de Cartagena	0	0	0	0	0	0	1	8	0	9	7	1
(Mexico) Brujos de Los Tuxtlas	0	0	0	0	0	0	0	0	1	1	5	0
WP: Ruddy Lugo (1-1); LP: Jorge Luis Castillo (1-1); Sv: n/a

== Statistics leaders ==
=== Batting ===
Statistic	Name	Total/Avg
Average	(Panama) Luis Castillo (Indios)	.579
RBIs	(Panama) Luis Castillo (Indios)	9
Home Runs	(Venezuela) Osman Marval (Tigres)	2
Runs	(Nicaragua) Dwight Britton (Gigantes)	6
Hits	(Panama) Luis Castillo (Indios)	11
Doubles	(Panama) Javier Castillo (Indios)	4
Triples	(Colombia) Jhonatan Lozada (Tigres) (Panama) Edgar Muñoz (Indios)	1

=== Pitching ===
Statistic	Name	Total/Avg
ERA	(Dominican Republic) Arismendy Mota (Tigres) (Colombia) Luis Gómez (Tigres)	0.00
Complete Games	(Panama) Abdiel Velásquez (Indios) (Mexico) Erubiel González (Brujos) (Mexico) Humberto Montemayor (Brujos) (Mexico) Jorge Luis Castillo (Brujos) (Panama) Rafael Rodríguez (Indios) (Dominican Republic) Rodney Rodríguez (Gigantes) (Venezuela) Roger Luque (Tigres) (Colombia) Ronald Ramírez (Tigres) (Dominican Republic) Ruddy Lugo (Tigres)	1
Strikeouts	(Mexico) Jorge Luis Castillo (Brujos)	14
WHIP	(Dominican Republic) Gustavo Martínez (Gigantes)	0.38
Saves	(Panama) Manny Acosta (Indios) (Dominican Republic) Sammy Gervacio (Brujos)	1
