= Gigantes de Rivas =

Professional baseball team based in Rivas, Nicaragua

Team logo	Cap insignia

Information
- League: Nicaraguan Professional Baseball League
- Location: Rivas, Nicaragua
- Ballpark: Estadio Yamil Ríos Ugarte
- Established: 2013; 12 years ago
- Latin American Series championships: 2016
- League championships: 4 (2013–14, 2015–16, 2020–21, 2023–24)
- Colors: Blue and orange
- Manager: Germán Mesa

Current uniforms
Home	Away

The Gigantes de Rivas (English: Rivas Giants) are a professional baseball team based in Rivas, Nicaragua. They compete in the Nicaraguan Professional Baseball League (LBPN). The team plays at the Estadio Yamil Ríos Ugarte. Established in 2013, the club has won the LBPN title four times in 2014, 2016, 2021 and 2024. The Gigantes also won the 2016 Latin American Series, becoming the first Nicaraguan team to win the Latin American Series.

== History ==
The Gigantes de Rivas were established in 2013, ahead of the 2013–14 Nicaraguan Professional Baseball League season. The team's first roster included players such as Randall Simon, managed by Dominican Manny Collado. The Gigantes won their first LBPN championship on their maiden season, defeating Indios del Bóer in the final series and participated in the 2014 Latin American Series representing Nicaragua, where they finished fourth with a 1–2 record.

Rivas won the Nicaraguan championship again in the 2015–16 season, this time under manager Germán Mesa. Gigantes defeated Oriental de Granada in the final series to claim their second LBPN title. The team represented Nicaragua in the 2016 Latin American Series, where they were crowned champions defeating Caimanes de Barranquilla in the final game, becoming the first Nicaraguan team to win the Latin American Series.

The team won its third championship in the 2020–21 season under Puerto Rican manager Joel Fuentes. The Gigantes defeated Tigres de Chinandega in the final series.

Gigantes de Rivas claimed its fourth national championship in the 2023–24 season, defeating Tren del Norte 4 games to 2 in the final series. Gigantes outfielder Francisco Peguero was awarded as the Most Valuable Player of the championship series. Germán Mesa repeated as manager, winning his second title with the club and third LBPN championship (the other one was in the 2012–13 season with Tigres de Chinandega).

The club was expected to represent Nicaragua in the nation's debut in the 2024 Caribbean Series. However, Nicaragua did not send the entire Gigantes squad; instead, a squad comprising the best Nicaraguan players will represent Nicaragua in the tournament. Nevertheless, various media sources, as well as official CPBC and MLB press releases, continued to refer to the Nicaraguan team as Gigantes. The Nicaraguan team, managed by Marvin Benard, finished the tournament in last place with a 0–6 record, being eliminated in the first round.

== Roster ==
Gigantes de Rivas roster
Players		Coaches
Pitchers: 29 (Dominican Republic) Al Alburquerque; 69 (Dominican Republic) Mauricio Cabrera; 72 (Nicaragua) Leo Crawford; 40 (Brazil) Tiago da Silva; 35 (Dominican Republic) Marcos Frías; 28 (Cuba) Yunieski García; 0 (Nicaragua) Carlos Gazo; 41 (Nicaragua) Osman Gutiérrez; 62 (Cuba) Pavel Hernández; 97 (Dominican Republic) Bryan Herrera; 13 (Nicaragua) Ángel Obando; 6 (Cuba) Miguel Romero; 16 (Dominican Republic) Carlos Sano; 70 (Nicaragua) Kevin Solís	Catchers: 27 (Nicaragua) Rafael Estrada; 22 (Dominican Republic) Raudy Read; 23 (Nicaragua) José Torrez; Infielders: 47 (Cuba) Lázaro Alonso; 59 (Dominican Republic) Yeison Coca; 24 (Nicaragua) Cheslor Cuthbert; 61 (Cuba) Yosmany Guerra; 7 (Nicaragua) Iván Marín; 25 (Nicaragua) Marvin Martínez; 38 (Nicaragua) Wuillians Vasquez; Outfielders: 17 (Nicaragua) Darren Britton; 15 (Cuba) Rusney Castillo; 98 (Nicaragua) Luis Montealto; 95 (Nicaragua) Cristhian Sandoval; 12 (Panama) Jhonny Santos; 26 (Dominican Republic) Jesús Valdez	Manager: 11 (Cuba) Germán Mesa; Coaches: 20 (Nicaragua) Adolfo Álvarez (pitching); 8 (Nicaragua) Brayan Castillo (coach); 4 (Nicaragua) Joel Fuentes (coach); 51 (Nicaragua) Adalid López (third base); 10 (Nicaragua) José López (first base); 39 (Nicaragua) Gustavo Martínez (pitching); 33 (Nicaragua) Aníbal Vega (coach); Roster updated on 21 February 2025

== Championships ==
Season	Manager	Opponent	Series score
2013–14	Manny Collado	Indios del Bóer	4–2
2015–16	Germán Mesa	Oriental de Granada	4–3
2020–21	Joel Fuentes	Tigres de Chinandega	4–2
2023–24	Germán Mesa	Tren del Norte	4–2
Total championships			4

== Latin American Series record ==
Year	Venue	Finish	Wins	Losses	Win%	Manager
2016	(Nicaragua) Managua	1st	3	1	.750	(Cuba) Germán Mesa
Total			3	1	.750	

== Caribbean Series record ==
Year	Venue	Finish	Wins	Losses	Win%	Manager
2024	(United States) Miami	7th	0	6	.000	(Nicaragua) Marvin Benard
Total			0	6	.000	
