= Estadio De Béisbol Beisborama 72 =

Stadium in Córdoba, Veracruz, Mexico

Estadio de Béisbol Beisborama 72
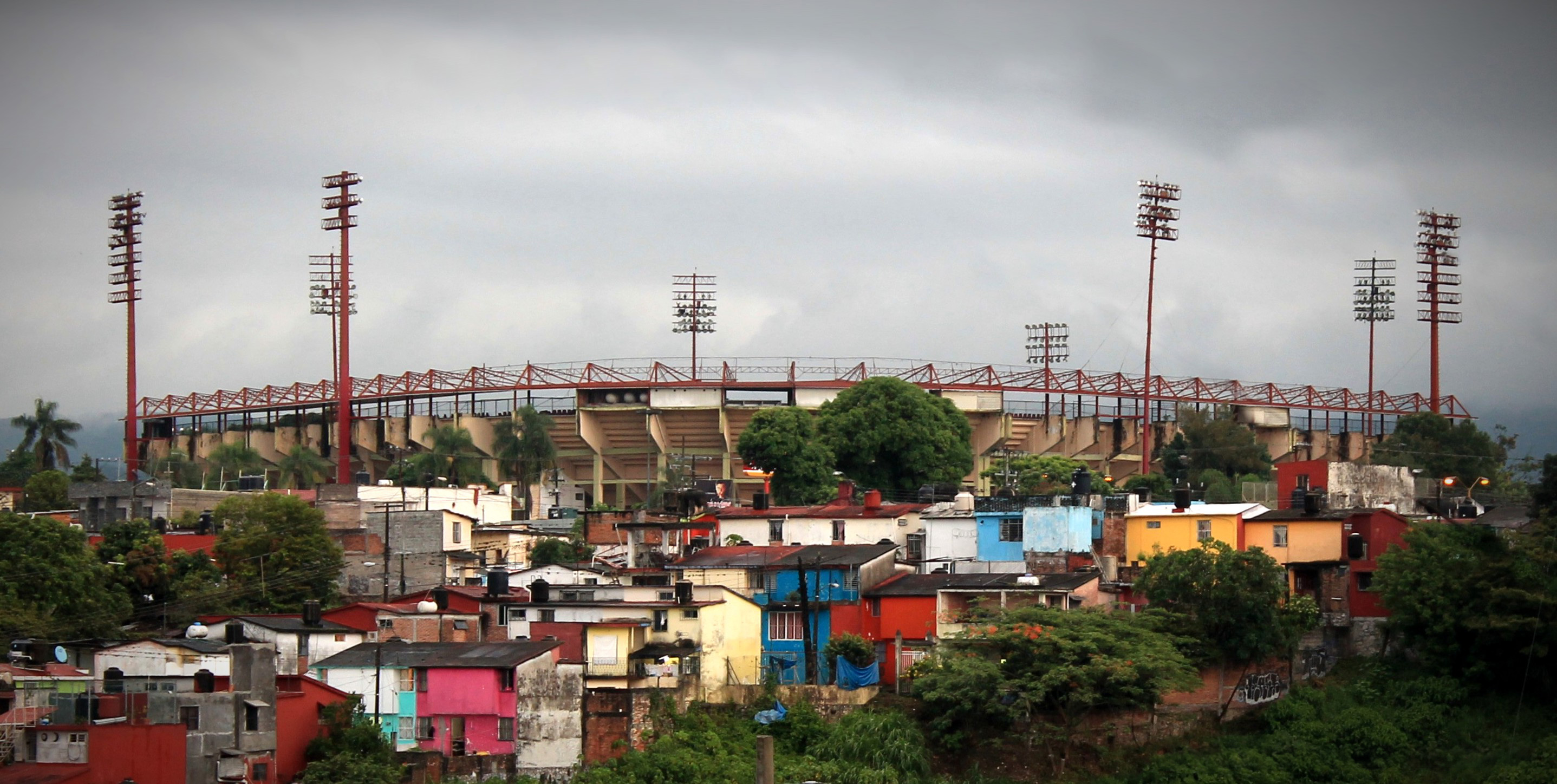
- Location: Av. Beisborama, Esq. Santa Margarita; Córdoba, Veracruz, Mexico
- Coordinates: 18°54′6.38″N 96°55′46.90″W
- Capacity: 12,000
- Field size: Left Field: 325 feet (99 m); Center Field: 410 feet (120 m); Right Field: 325 feet (99 m)
- Surface: Grass

Construction
- Opened: 1972
- Renovated: 1998

Tenants
- Cafeteros de Córdoba (VWL)

Estadio de Béisbol Beisborama 72 is a stadium in the Mexican city of Córdoba, Veracruz. It is primarily used for baseball and is the home field of the Cafeteros de Córdoba who play in the Veracruz Winter League. It holds 12,000 people and was built in 1972 (and renovated in 1998).
