= Tigres de Chinandega =

Nicaraguan baseball team

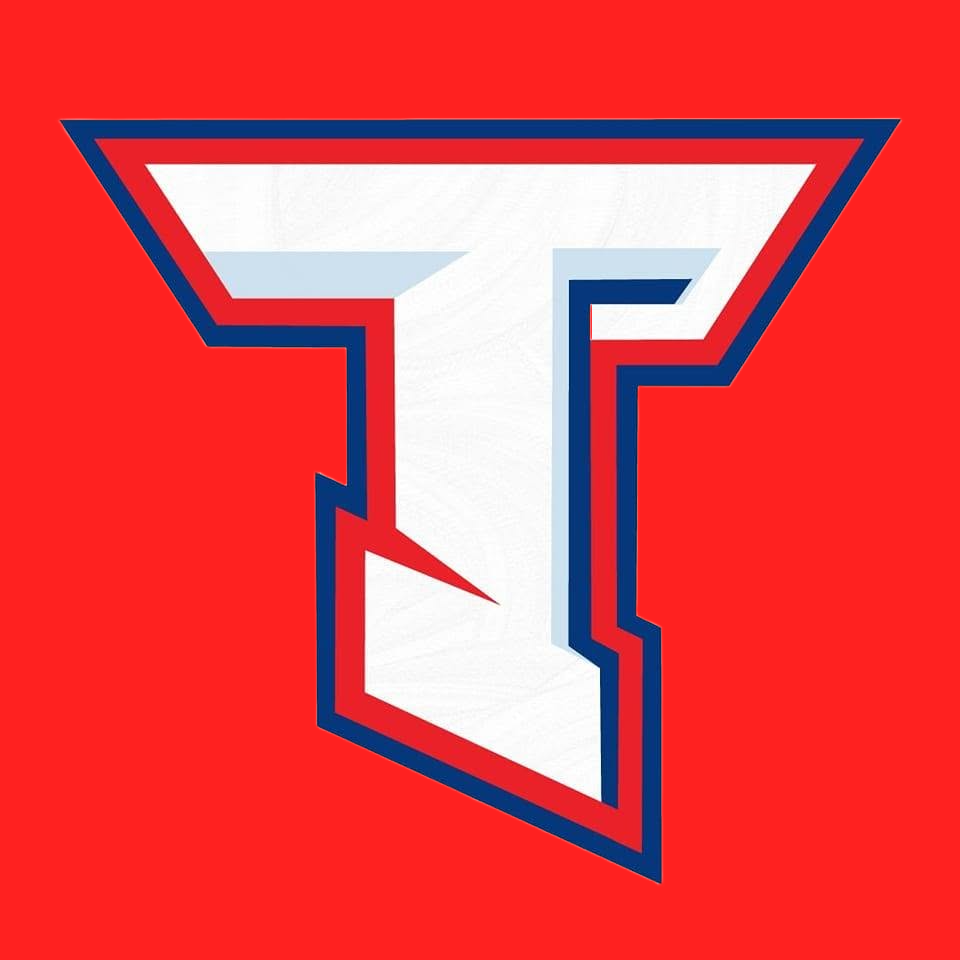
Logo	Cap insignia

Information
- League: Nicaraguan Professional Baseball League
- Location: Chinandega, Nicaragua
- Ballpark: Estadio Efraín Tijerino
- Latin American Series championships: 2 (2017, 2018)
- League championships: 4 (2005–06, 2012–13, 2016–17, 2017–18)
- Colors: Red, blue, white (APBN) Blue, gold, black (Pomares)

The Tigres de Chinandega (English: Chinandega Tigers) are a baseball club that competes in the Nicaragua Professional Baseball League (APBN), representing the city of Chinandega. The team has won the league championship four times, in 2006, 2012, 2017, and most recently in 2018. Tigres play their home games at Estadio Efraín Tijerino, which seats 9,000 people.

The team has also won two championships while playing in the Nicaraguan amateur baseball league, the Germán Pomares Ordóñez First Division (Spanish: Campeonato Nacional de Béisbol Superior Germán Pomares Ordoñez), in 1971 and 1974.

Tigres won their second championship in 2013 and went on to participate in the 2013 Latin American Series held in Veracruz, where they finished as runners-up with 2 wins and 1 loss. They returned to the tournament in 2017, where they won their first international title, defeating Colombia's Leones de Montería 4–0 in the final. Tigres won again in the 2018 edition, making them the winningest team in Latin American Series history after the tournament was suspended in 2019.

== International competition ==
=== Latin American Series ===
Year	Venue	Finish	Wins	Losses	Win%	Manager
2013	(Mexico) Veracruz	2nd	3	1	.750	(Cuba) Germán Mesa
2017	(Colombia) Montería	1st	3	1	.750	(Panama) Len Picota
2018	(Nicaragua) Managua	1st	4	0	1.000	(Panama) Len Picota
Total			9	2	.818	

=== Baseball Champions League Americas ===
Year	Venue	Finish	Wins	Losses	Win%	Manager
2025	Mexico City	5th	1	2	.333	(Nicaragua) Sandor Guido
Total			1	2	.333	

== Roster ==
Tigres de Chinandega roster
Players		Coaches
Pitchers: 72 Leonardo Crawford; 77 Jesus Garrido; 44 Yeris Gonzalez; 41 Osman Gutierrez; 96 Santos Jarquin; 55 Walter Lopez; 36 Ronald Medrano; 32 Dilmer Mejia; 31 Angel Obando; 66 J. C. Ramírez; 30 Luis Somarriba; 78 Bryan Torres; 88 Axel Zapata	Catchers: 24 Rodolfo Bone; 20 Marlon Diaz; 23 Ronald Rivera; Infielders: 1 Benjamin Alegria; 5 Brandon Leyton; 34 Jesus Lopez; 4 Odlanyer Matamoros; 11 Bryan Munguia; 6 Saul Orozco; 18 Emanuel Trujillo; Outfielders: 45 Omar Mendoza; 22 Isaac Mondragon; 99 Juan Montes; Designated hitters: 28 Elian Miranda	Manager: 7 Sandor Guido; Coaches: 2 Adolfo Matamoros (1st base); 8 Nery Colmenares (3rd base); 27 Prospero González (Bench); 46 Oswaldo Mairena (Pitching)
