= Jordan Díaz (baseball) =

Colombian baseball player (born 2000)

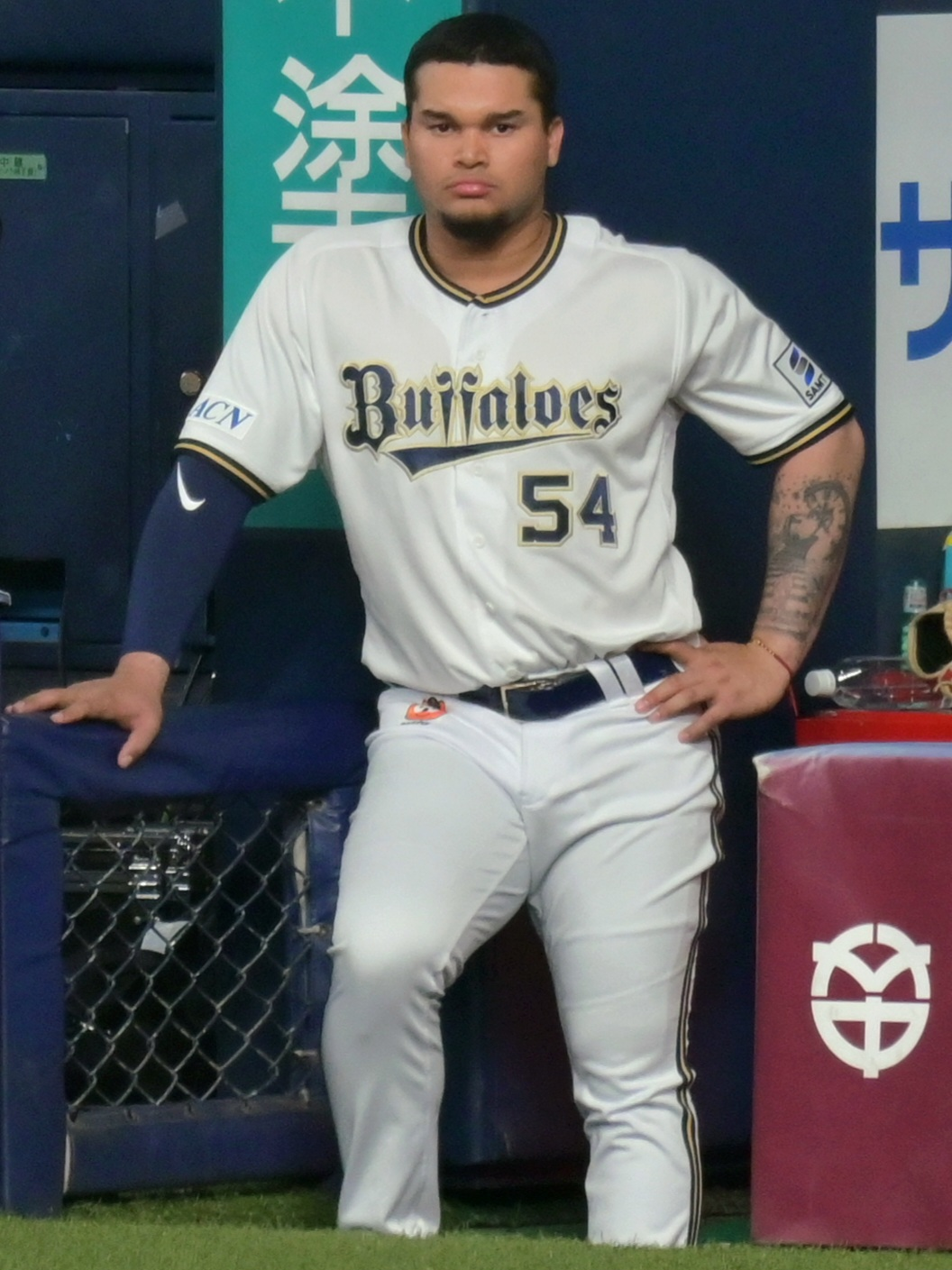
- Díaz with the Orix Buffaloes in 2025

Free agent
- Second baseman
- Born: August 13, 2000 (age 25); Montería, Colombia
- Bats: Right Throws: Right

Professional debut
- MLB: September 18, 2022, for the Oakland Athletics
- NPB: April 12, 2025, for the Orix Buffaloes

MLB statistics (through 2023 season)
- Batting average: .227
- Home runs: 10
- Runs batted in: 28

NPB statistics (through 2025 season)
- Batting average: .228
- Home runs: 2
- Runs batted in: 6
- Stats at Baseball Reference

Teams
- Oakland Athletics (2022–2023); Orix Buffaloes (2025)
Medals
Men's baseball
Representing Colombia
Junior Pan American Games
Gold medal – first place	2021 Cali-Valle	Team

Jordan David Díaz Sandoval (born August 13, 2000) is a Colombian professional baseball second baseman who is a free agent. He has previously played in Major League Baseball (MLB) for the Oakland Athletics, and in Nippon Professional Baseball (NPB) for the Orix Buffaloes.

== Career ==
=== Oakland Athletics ===
Díaz signed with the Oakland Athletics as an international free agent on August 13, 2016. As of 2021, in the minor leagues he had played 205 games at third base, 24 at first base, 12 at DH, 4 in left field, and one each at second base and catcher, and had a career slash line of .271/.324/.417. On November 19, 2021, the Athletics added Díaz to their 40-man roster to protect him from the Rule 5 draft.

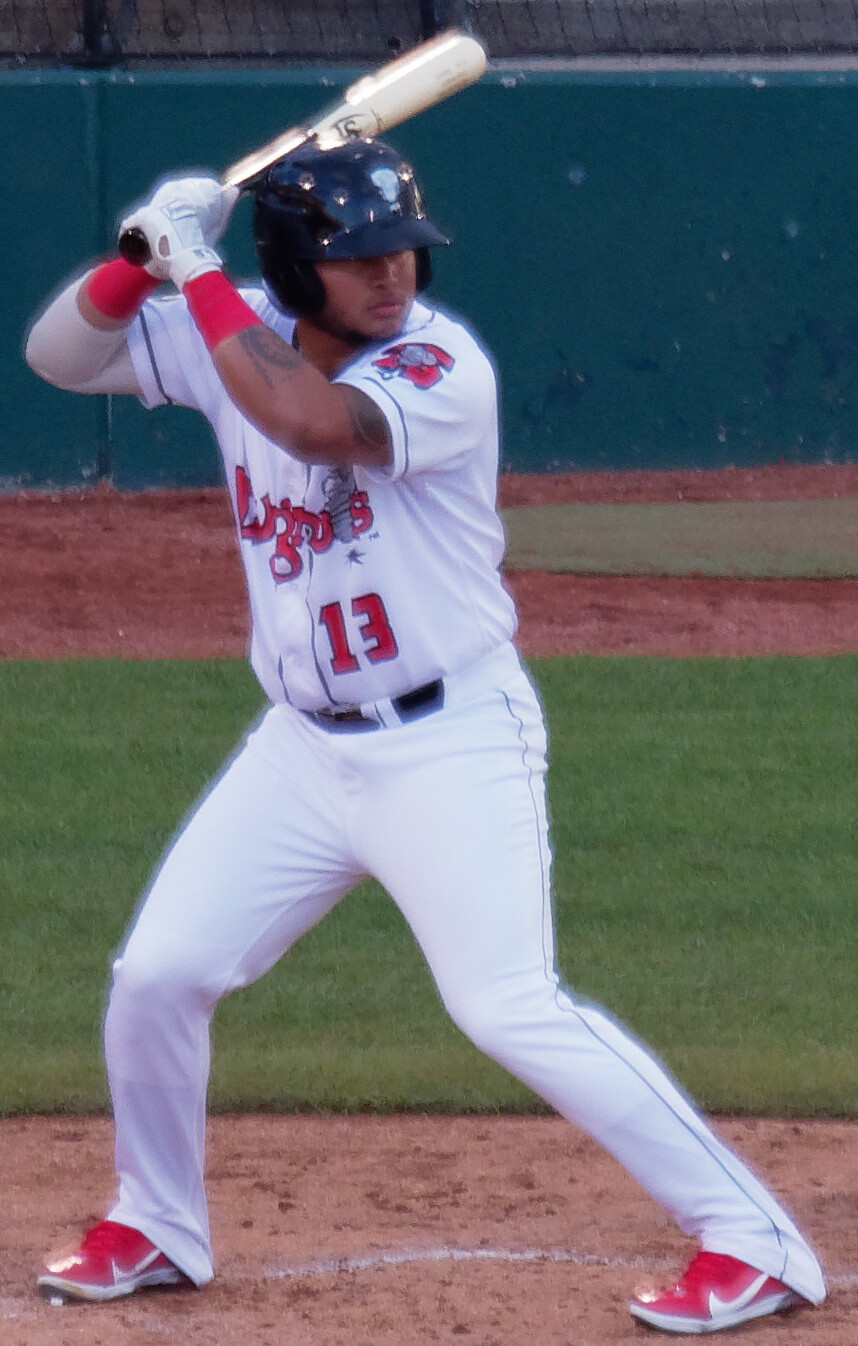
Díaz with the Lansing Lugnuts in 2021

==== 2022 ====
Díaz began the 2022 season with the Double–A Midland RockHounds, and was promoted to Triple–A after hitting .319 with 15 home runs and 58 RBI across 94 games. On September 17, 2022, Díaz was promoted to the major leagues for the first time. He made his major league debut the following day against the Houston Astros, collecting his first career hit in the game, a single off of reliever Phil Maton. In 2022 with the Athletics he batted .265/.294/.327 with no home runs and one RBI in 49 at bats, walking 3.9% of the time (as opposed to the league average of 8.3%).

In the offseason, Díaz played winter ball with his hometown Vaqueros de Montería, batting .339/.428/.468. The team won the Colombian Professional Baseball League championship and went on to represent Colombia in the 2023 Caribbean Series.

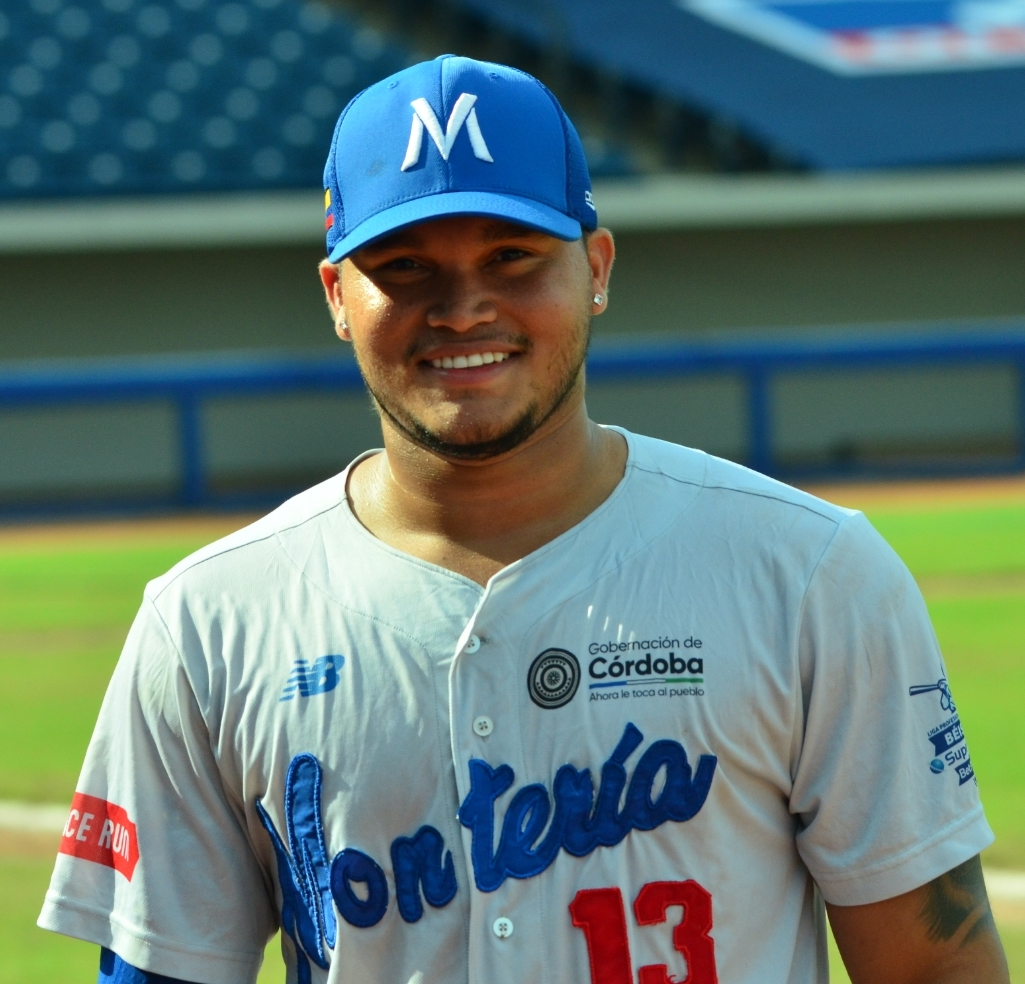
Díaz with the Vaqueros de Montería in 2022

==== 2023 ====
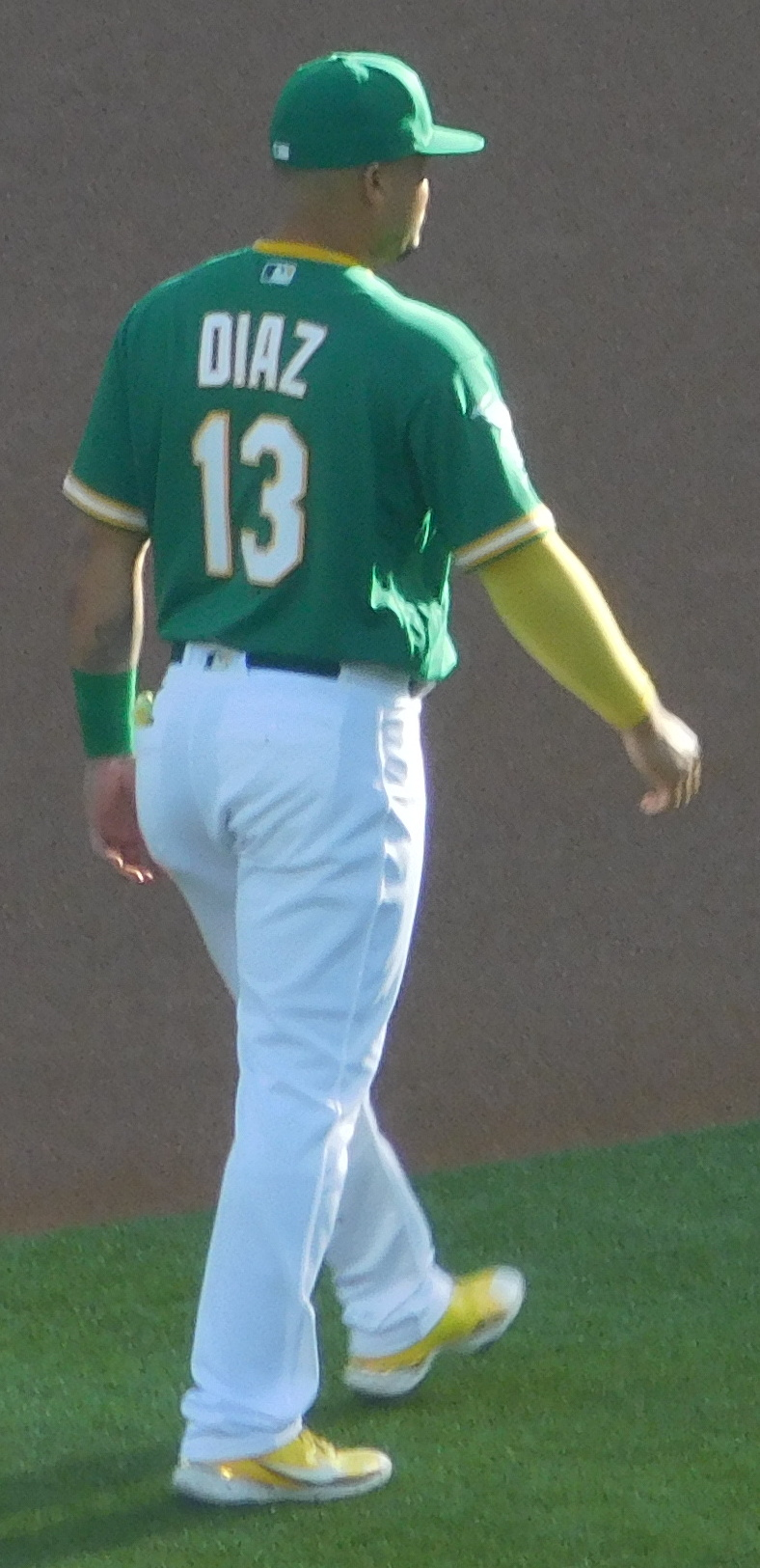
Díaz with the Athletics in 2023

The Athletics optioned Díaz to the Triple-A Las Vegas Aviators to begin the 2023 season. They promoted him to the major leagues on April 19. On April 21, Díaz hit his first career home run, a go-ahead solo shot off of Texas Rangers reliever Will Smith at Globe Life Field. On May 9, Díaz had his first multi-homer game, launching three home runs at Yankee Stadium against the New York Yankees. His first home run was a solo homer off of starter Clarke Schmidt, with his second home run also a solo homer off of reliever Albert Abreu, and his final blast a two-run homer off of Greg Weissert. In doing so, he became the only second baseman in franchise history to accomplish the feat alongside Héctor López. In 90 games for Oakland, Díaz hit .221/.273/.364 with 10 home runs and 27 RBI.

==== 2024 ====
Díaz was optioned to Triple–A Las Vegas to begin the 2024 season. In 29 games for Las Vegas, he hit .204/.288/.327 with two home runs and 10 RBI. On May 22, 2024, Díaz was designated for assignment by Oakland. He cleared waivers and was sent outright to Las Vegas on May 27. Díaz elected free agency following the season on November 4.

=== Orix Buffaloes ===
On January 8, 2025, Díaz signed with the Orix Buffaloes of Nippon Professional Baseball. He made 50 appearances for the Buffaloes, batting .228/.290/.307 with two home runs and six RBI. Díaz became a free agent following the season.

=== Tecolotes de los Dos Laredos ===
On February 24, 2026, Díaz signed with the Tecolotes de los Dos Laredos of the Mexican League. In 11 appearances for the team, he slashed .211/.302/.211 with no home runs and two RBI. Díaz was released by Dos Laredos on April 30.

=== Leones de Yucatán ===
On May 9, 2026, Díaz signed with the Leones de Yucatán of the Mexican League. In 12 appearances for the Leones, he batted .289/.333/.356 with three doubles and two RBI. On May 28, Díaz was released by Yucatán.

== International career ==
Díaz played for the Colombian national baseball team in the 2023 World Baseball Classic. He struggled in the tournament, going hitless over 10 at-bats with one walk.

== Personal life ==
Díaz has openly criticized the management of professional baseball in Colombia. In a 2023 social media post, he accused Édinson Rentería, a Colombian baseball executive and brother of Édgar Rentería, of stifling the growth of baseball in Colombia. "He is a person who deceives, abuses the trust, and defrauds... I hope that people realize this, that is why I make this message public." Rentería responded by saying he would take legal action against Díaz.
