= Everth Cabrera =

Nicaraguan baseball player (born 1986)

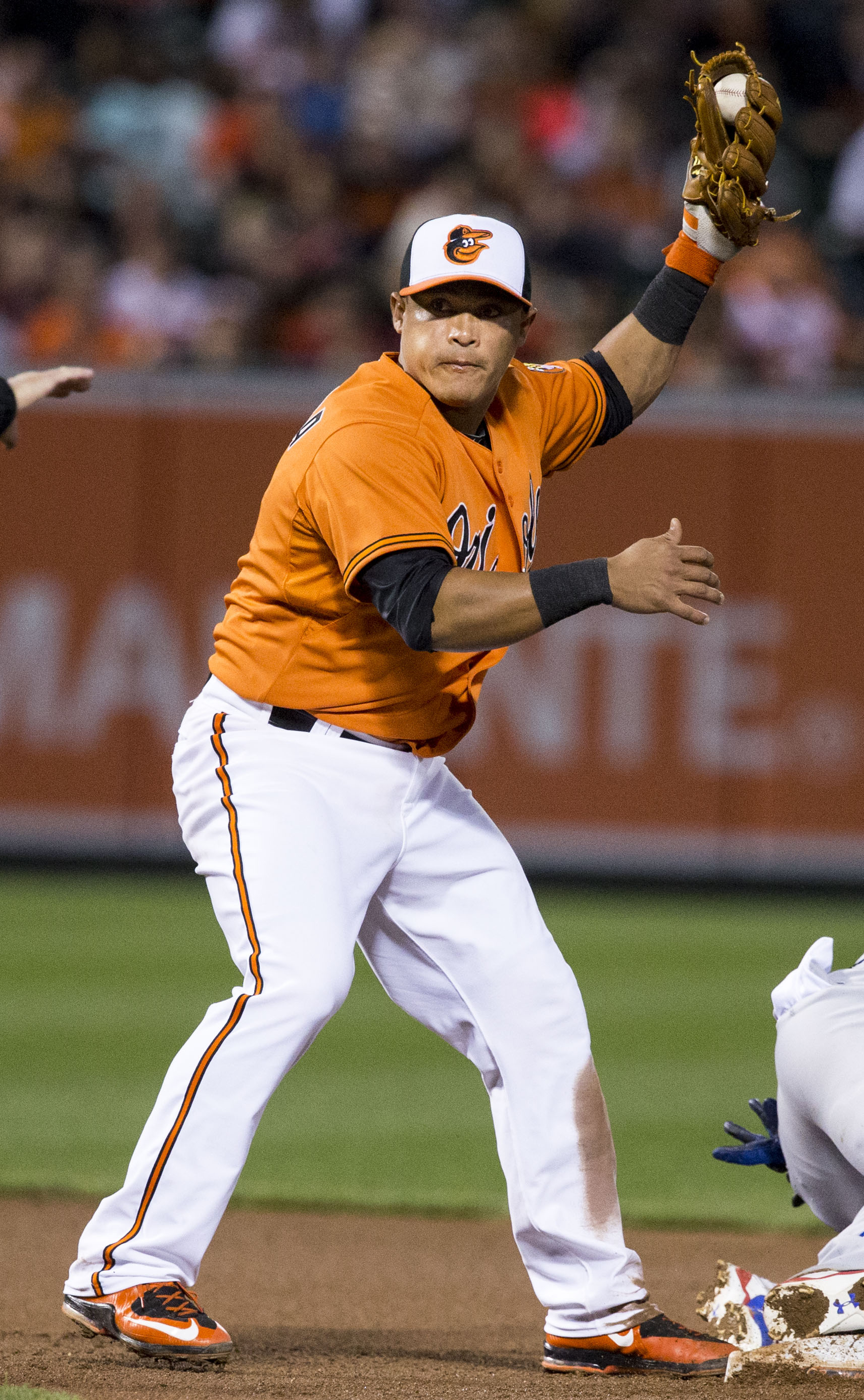
- Cabrera with the Baltimore Orioles
- Shortstop
- Born: November 17, 1986 (age 40); Nandaime, Nicaragua
- Batted: Switch Threw: Right

MLB debut
- April 8, 2009, for the San Diego Padres

Last MLB appearance
- June 4, 2015, for the Baltimore Orioles

MLB statistics
- Batting average: .246
- Home runs: 12
- Runs batted in: 132
- Stolen bases: 138
- Stats at Baseball Reference

Teams
- San Diego Padres (2009–2014); Baltimore Orioles (2015)

Career highlights and awards
- All-Star (2013); NL stolen base leader (2012)

Everth Cabrera (born November 17, 1986) is a Nicaraguan former professional baseball infielder. He played in Major League Baseball (MLB) for the San Diego Padres and Baltimore Orioles. He led the National League (NL) in stolen bases in 2012, and was an All-Star in 2013.

== Professional career ==
=== Colorado Rockies ===
Cabrera began his professional career in 2006, playing in the Colorado Rockies organization for the Casper Rockies. In 54 games, he hit .254 with 18 stolen bases. In 2007, he played for the Tri-City Dust Devils and Modesto Nuts, hitting .300 with 12 stolen bases in 150 at bats for the former and .267 in 15 at-bats for the latter.

While with the Asheville Tourists in 2008, in 121 games he hit .284 with 73 stolen bases—more than any other minor leaguer.

=== San Diego Padres ===
He was selected by the Padres from the Rockies minor league system in the Rule 5 draft on December 11, 2008.

==== 2009–2012 ====
Cabrera stole 9 bases in spring training 2009 for the Padres, and made the opening day roster as a backup infielder. As a Rule 5 draftee, the Padres were required to keep Cabrera on the 25-man roster throughout the 2009 season. He got his first hit in the major leagues on April 8, a double off of Cory Wade of the Los Angeles Dodgers in the seventh inning at Petco Park.

Cabrera had a solid rookie year debut despite losing two months to a hand injury, batting .255 with 25 steals and 59 runs scored in 103 games with the Padres, but he also led all NL shortstops with 23 errors. On August 7, Cabrera hit a walk-off grand-slam off the Mets closer Francisco Rodríguez in the bottom of the 9th, capping a Padres win 6 – 2. Cabrera helped defeat the Arizona Diamondbacks on September 16 (F/10, 6-5) with a game-winning, walk-off RBI that scored another fast rookie, Luis Durango. In November 2009, Cabrera was named Nicaragua's Professional Sports Athlete of the Year.

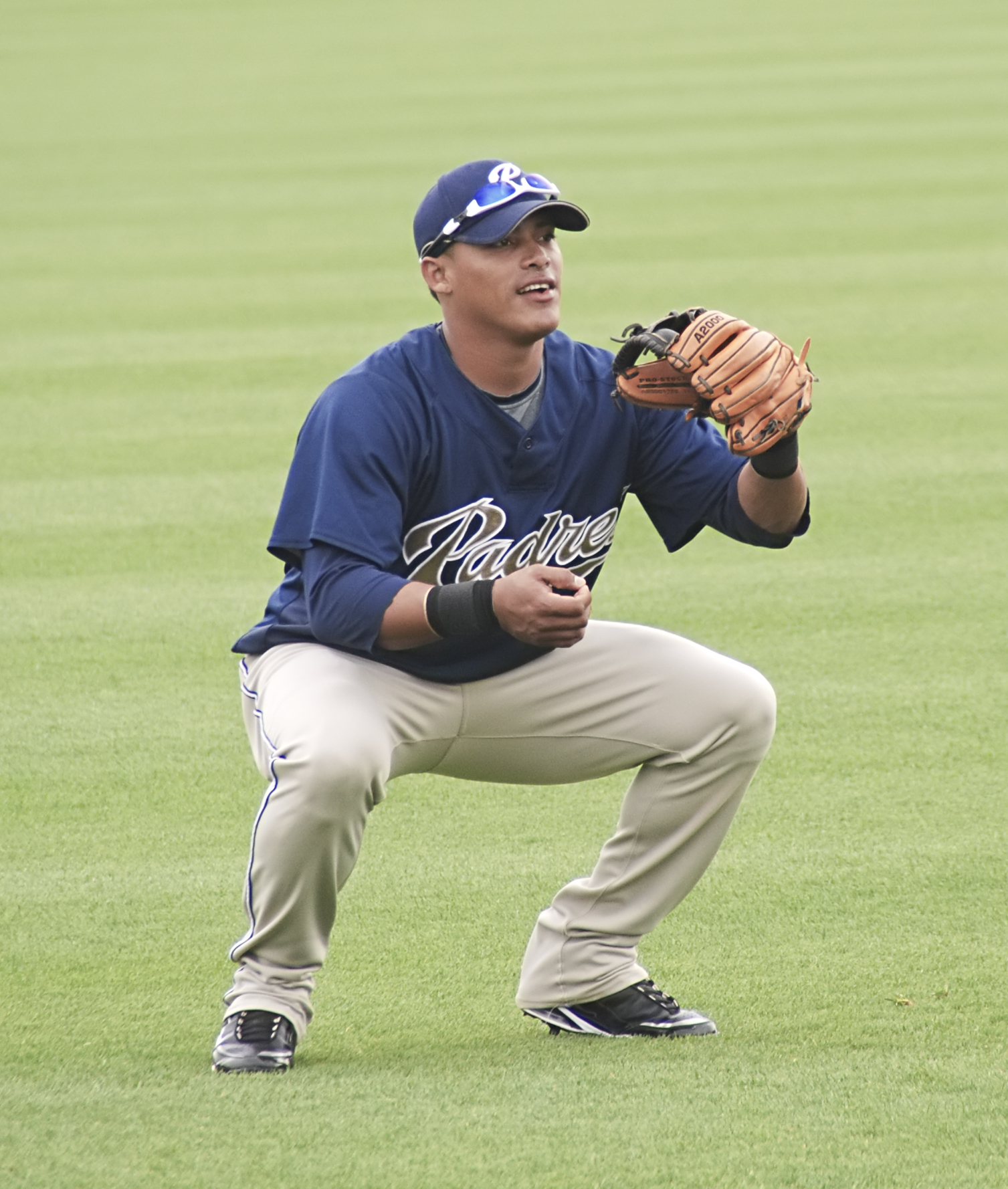
Cabrera with the San Diego Padres in 2009 spring training

Cabrera was the Padres Opening Day shortstop in 2010, but only played in 76 games that year due to a nagging right hamstring injury. His performance also fell off significantly compared to 2009, and the Padres signed Jason Bartlett in the offseason to be their regular shortstop.

Cabrera spent the majority of the 2011 season with the Tucson Padres of the Class AAA Pacific Coast League (PCL), only appearing with the Major League club in two games in mid-July. Cabrera separated his shoulder at the end of the 2011 season, and the injury continued to bother him into spring training in 2012, where Cabrera said he "couldn't swing 100 percent" and didn't feel good about the shoulder.

Cabrera started the 2012 season with the Tucson Padres where he posted a .333 batting average and .389 on-base percentage in 34 games. On May 17, he was called up to the major league club when Bartlett was sent to the disabled list after a poor start to the year, and Cabrera became the Padres everyday shortstop.

Cabrera had an exceptional year on the basepaths in 2012. On July 14 in a game against the Los Angeles Dodgers, Cabrera stole home in the 9th inning to score the tying run. The eventual winning run then scored when pitcher Kenley Jansen threw the ball past the catcher. This was the first time in nearly 30 years that a regular season MLB game was won with the tying or go-ahead run scoring on a steal of home in the 9th inning or later. In a September 30 game, he became the first player in 14 years to steal four bases without recording a hit. Cabrera became the first Padre to lead the NL in stolen bases with 44. He set a team record with a 91.7 percent success rate on steals (44-for-48), which also led the NL. He also set Padres team records with 24 consecutive stolen bases without being caught to start the season, and 28 straight successful steals dating back to 2010. Cabrera finished the season batting .246, with a .324 on-base percentage, in a career-high 115 games played. After the 2012 season, Cabrera played for the Nicaragua national baseball team for the 2013 World Baseball Classic Qualifying Tournament

==== 2013–2014 ====
Cabrera opened 2013 as the Padres shortstop and started 69 consecutive games at the position before he went to the 15-day disabled list in mid-June with a hamstring injury. On May 14, Cabrera collected the 60,000th hit in Padres history. He was selected to the All-Star team as a reserve, having a .291 batting average, .373 on-base percentage, and 34 stolen bases at the break.

On August 5, 2013, Cabrera was suspended 50 games, the remainder of the Padres' season, by Major League Baseball for using performance-enhancing drugs from Biogenesis. At the time of the suspension, he was leading the National League with 37 stolen bases. Cabrera ended the year with a .283/.355/.381 line in 95 games played.

Cabrera batted .232/.272/.300 in 90 games during the 2014 season. He became a free agent on December 2, 2014 after he was non-tendered by the Padres.

=== Baltimore Orioles ===
On February 25, 2015, Cabrera and the Baltimore Orioles finalized a one-year contract for the 2015 season. The deal was worth $2.4 million. He was designated for assignment by Baltimore on June 5, and was released on June 13. He hit just .208/.250/.229 in 29 games as a member of the Orioles.

=== San Francisco Giants ===
On July 16, 2015, Cabrera signed a minor league deal with the San Francisco Giants. He batted .231 for the Sacramento River Cats of the PCL. Cabrera was not promoted to the majors when rosters expanded on September 1, and was released the next day after refusing to play for Sacramento.

=== Chicago White Sox ===
On January 7, 2017, Cabrera signed a minor league contract with the Chicago White Sox. He was released on July 14.

=== Algodoneros de Unión Laguna ===
On March 19, 2018, Cabrera signed with the Algodoneros de Unión Laguna of the Mexican League. In 26 games for Unión Laguna, he slashed .252/.300/.369 with one home run, eight RBI, and seven stolen bases.

=== Leones de Yucatán ===
On April 23, 2018, Cabrera was traded to the Leones de Yucatán of the Mexican League. In 84 games for Yucatán, he hit .368/.427/.465 with three home runs and 34 RBI. Cabrera became a free agent following the season.

In the offseason, Cabrera appeared in the Mexican Pacific League for the Cañeros de Los Mochis. Cabrera next appeared in the Nicaraguan Professional Baseball League, in 2019-20 for the Gigantes de Rivas and in 2020-21 for the Tren del Norte.

== Biogenesis involvement ==
During spring training of 2013, Everth Cabrera's name was reported to have appeared in documents retrieved from the Biogenesis clinic which listed him as having received the clinic's products. MLB officials were investigating the head of the clinic, Anthony Bosch, and his ties to performance-enhancing drugs. Cabrera said he was "a little surprised" and "disappointed" by the report, which said Cabrera's name was listed next to a dollar amount and a date of March. At the time of the report, Cabrera spoke to both manager Bud Black and general manager Josh Byrnes, and Black said they were "satisfied" and that "We believe this will resolve itself in a positive way".

After completing an investigation in August, MLB suspended Cabrera and 12 other players for involvement with the Biogenesis clinic. Cabrera was one of 12 players receiving 50-game suspensions, all of whom made a deal with MLB to not appeal the decision. In a press conference on the day of his suspension, Cabrera admitted to taking a banned substance and apologized to fans and his teammates. He did not specify the substance, but said he took it briefly after he realized that his shoulder was still not healthy as spring training was approaching in 2012. He also stated that he did not initially seek out the substance, but it was presented to him by a consultant employed by his former agents. The same agency has been linked to all 12 players who received 50-game suspensions in the scandal.

== Personal life ==
During spring training in 2012, Cabrera was arrested on a charge of assault stemming from an incident of domestic violence. Prosecutors dismissed the charge in June.

An officer of the California Highway Patrol arrested Cabrera on September 3, 2014, on suspicion of driving under the influence of marijuana. In November 2014, Cabrera was charged with resisting arrest. In February 2015, Cabrera reached a plea deal with San Diego County and received a sentence of three years probation, a $655 fine, and eighty hours of volunteer work.
