= Sandor Guido =

Nicaraguan baseball player and coach (born 1978)

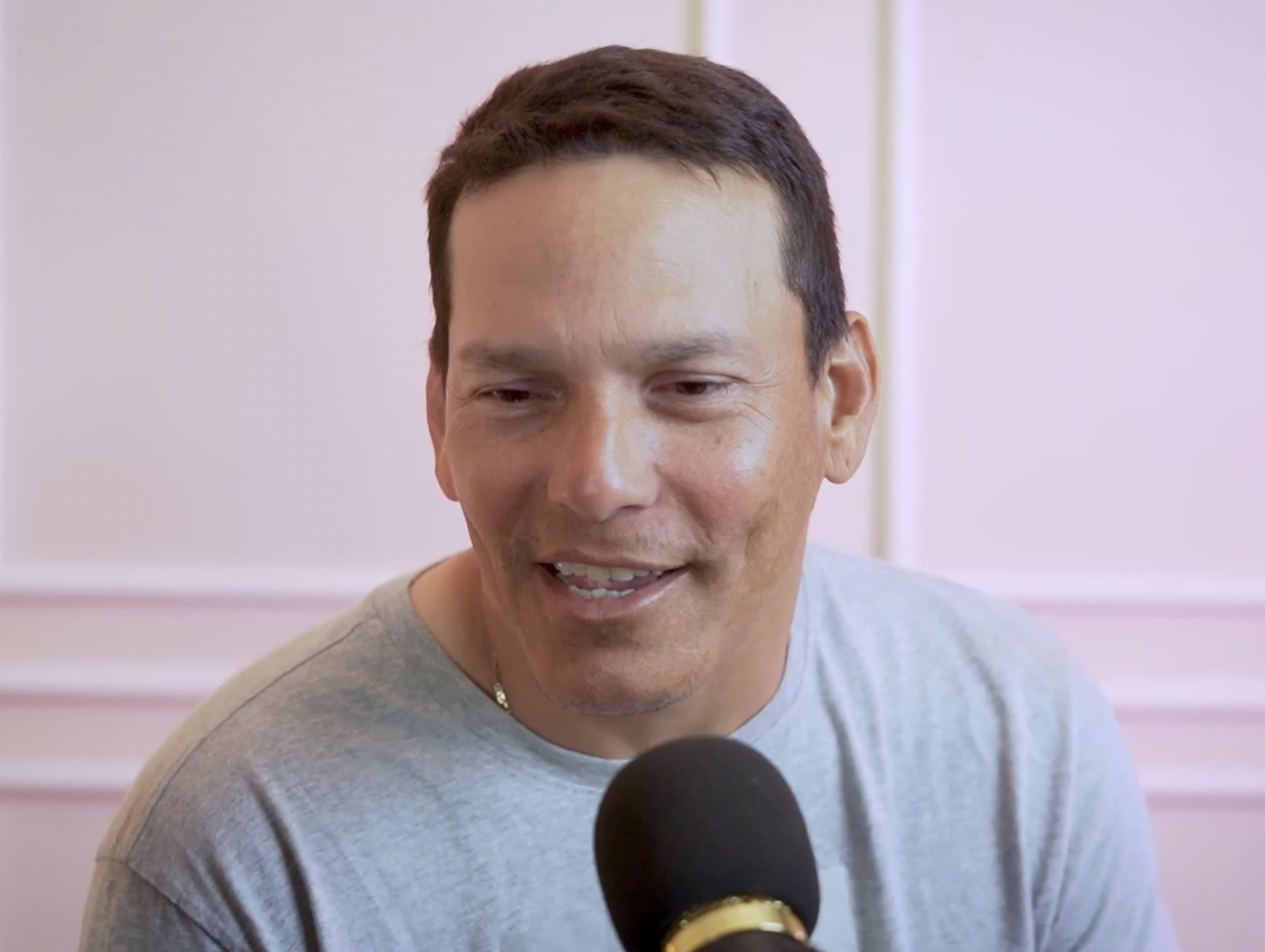
- Guido in 2023

Leones de León – No. 7
- Pitcher / Manager
- Born: December 15, 1978 (age 47); León, Nicaragua
- Bats: Left Throws: Left
Medals
Men's baseball
Representing Nicaragua
Pan American Games
Bronze medal – third place	2007 Rio de Janeiro	Team
Central American and Caribbean Games
Bronze medal – third place	2010 Mayagüez	Team
Manager for Nicaragua
Central American and Caribbean Games
Silver medal – second place	2026 Santo Domingo	Team
Central American Games
Gold medal – first place	2025 Guatemala City	Team

Sandor José Guido Mayorga (born December 15, 1978) is a Nicaraguan professional baseball player and coach who is the current manager of the Leones de León of the Nicaraguan Professional Baseball League. He managed the Nicaragua national baseball team at the 2023 World Baseball Classic.

Guido played for the Nicaragua national team for 16 years. He participated in three Baseball World Cups, in 2001, 2003 and 2005 and won a bronze medal at the 2007 Pan American Games. At the qualifiers for the 2017 World Baseball Classic, he went hitless in three at-bats over five games, though he was second on the team in walks, with two. In January 2023, Guido was appointed manager of the Nicaraguan national team ahead of the 2023 World Baseball Classic.

Guido has led Leones to four LBPN championships (2019, 2020, 2022, 2025). As a player, he participated in Leones championships in 2005 and 2010. Guido led the Tigres de Chinandega in the 2025 Baseball Champions League Americas, where the team finished fifth with a 1–2 record and was eliminated by the Santa Maria Pirates from Curaçao in the quarterfinals.

Guido managed Nicaragua at the 2026 World Baseball Classic qualifiers, held in Taiwan in February 2025, where the team went undefeated to qualify for the 2026 tournament. He was expected to manage the national team at the main tournament, but FENIBA announced in July 2025 that MLB veteran Dusty Baker would instead lead the team, with Guido as an assistant coach.

In 2025, Guido was elected to the Nicaraguan Sports Hall of Fame based on his playing career.
