= Estadio Universitario Beto Ávila =

Sports stadium in Veracruz, Mexico

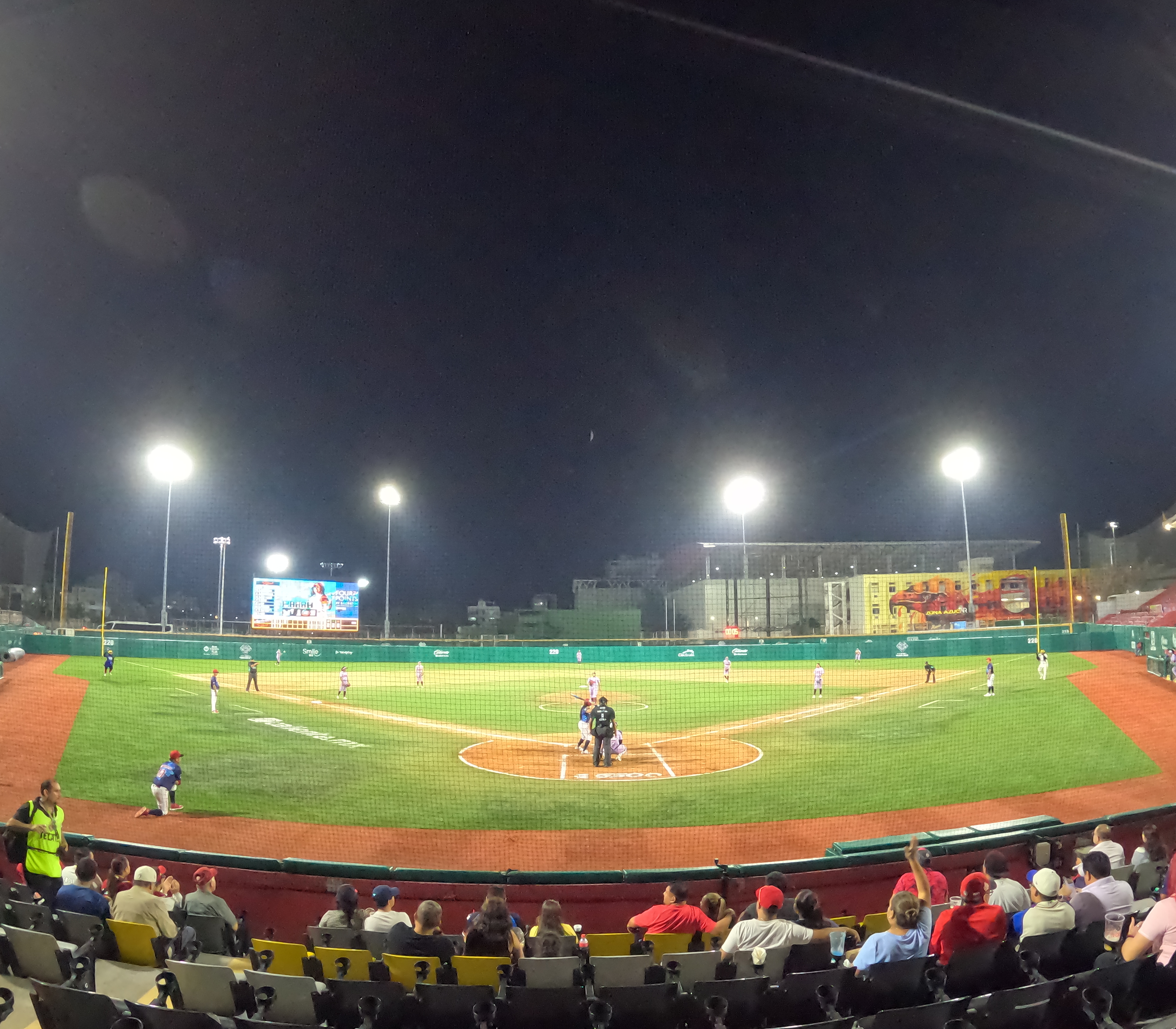
- The stadium in January 2026
- Interactive map of Estadio Universitario Beto Ávila
- Location: Veracruz, Veracruz, Mexico
- Coordinates: 19°9′54.35″N 96°7′21.85″W
- Capacity: 6,901

Construction
- Opened: 1992

Tenants
- Rojos del Águila de Veracruz (1992–2017); El Águila de Veracruz (2021–present)

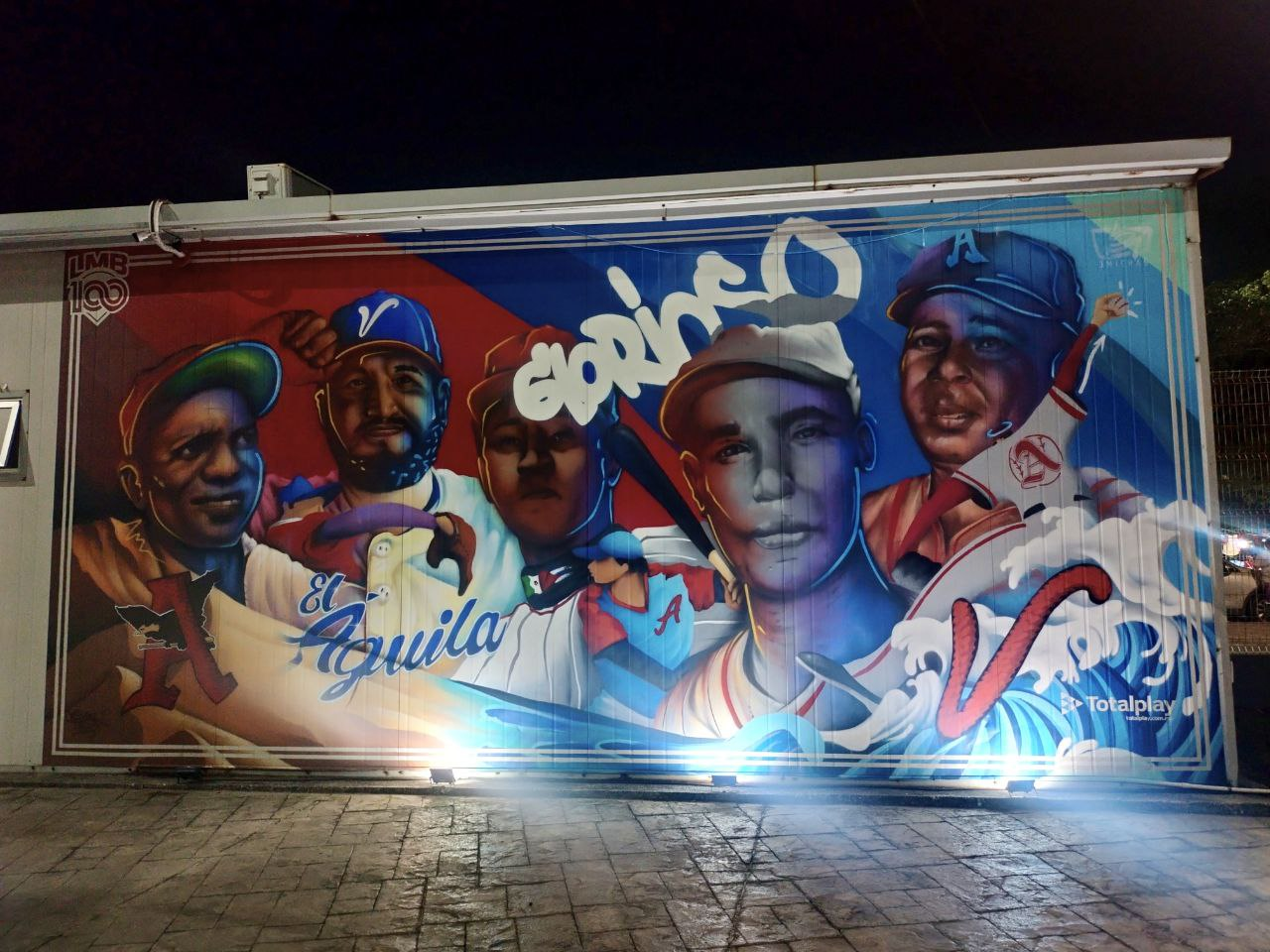
100th anniversary mural at the stadium for the Mexican League

Estadio Universitario Beto Ávila is a stadium in Veracruz, Mexico. It is primarily used for baseball and is home to El Águila de Veracruz of the Mexican League. It previously served as the home stadium for the Rojos del Águila de Veracruz from 1992 to 2017. The stadium has a capacity of 6,901 people. Prior to this stadium they played at the Parque Deportivo Veracruzano.

The stadium is named to honor Veracruz native Beto Ávila who played for the Cleveland Indians and a few other Major League Baseball teams before returning to play his last year (1960) as a player for the Tigres del México. After retiring from active play Beto Ávila worked to further organize and advance the sport of baseball in Mexico.

The ballpark hosted the 2007 and 2024 editions of the Mexican League All-Star Game.
