= Davis Romero =

Panamanian baseball player (born 1983)

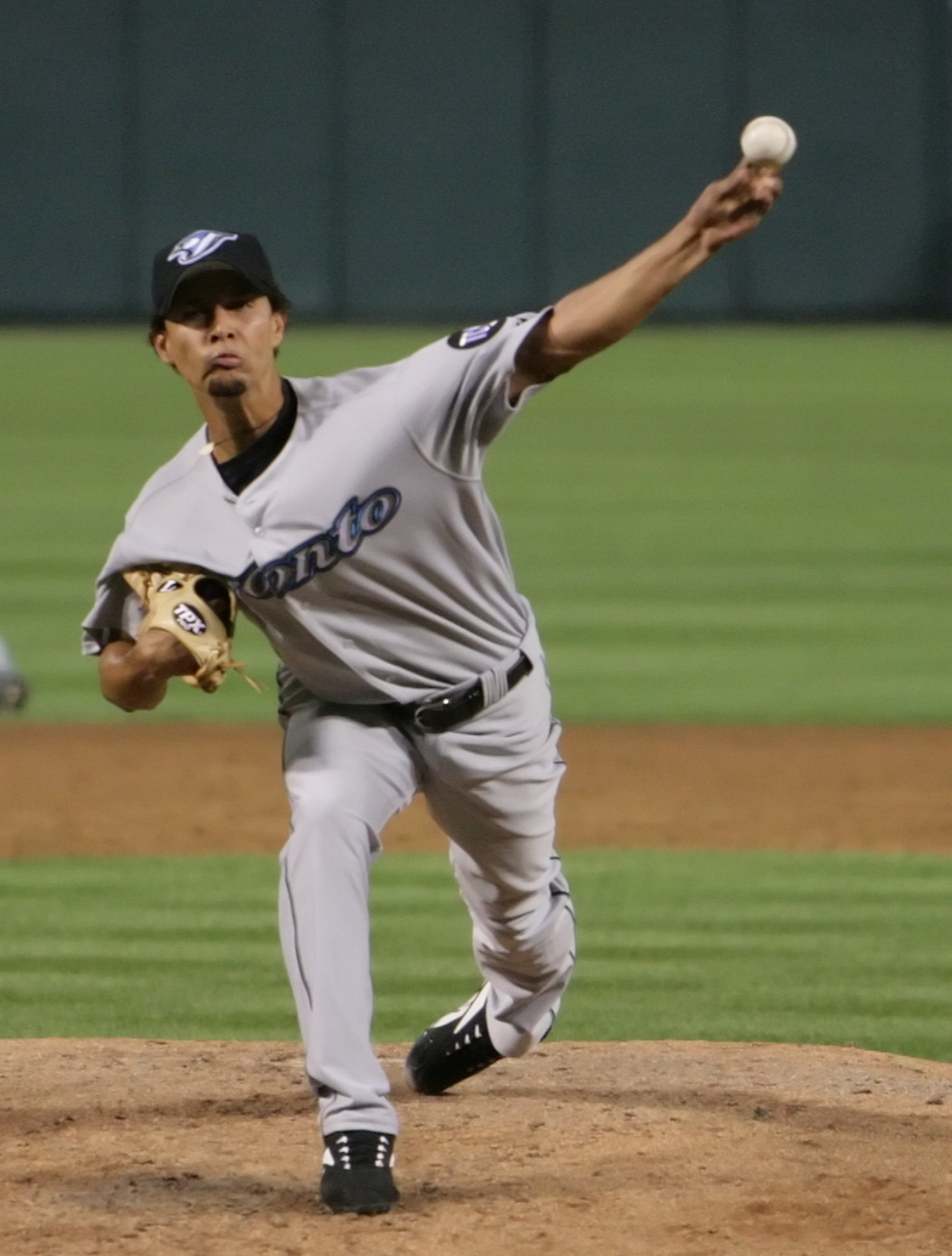

Free agent
- Relief pitcher
- Born: March 30, 1983 (age 43); Aguadulce, Panama
- Batted: Left Threw: Left

MLB debut
- August 18, 2006, for the Toronto Blue Jays

Last MLB appearance
- September 30, 2006, for the Toronto Blue Jays

MLB statistics
- Win–loss record: 1–0
- Earned run average: 3.86
- Strikeouts: 10
- Stats at Baseball Reference

Teams
- Toronto Blue Jays (2006)
Medals
Men's baseball
Representing Panama
Central American and Caribbean Games
Gold medal – first place	2026 Santo Domingo	Team

Davis Javier Romero (born March 30, 1983) is a Panamanian former professional baseball pitcher who is currently free agent. He has played in Major League Baseball (MLB) for the Toronto Blue Jays.

== Career ==
Davis made his Major League debut on August 18, 2006 against the Baltimore Orioles, pitching 2.2 innings, allowing one hit, no runs, no walks, and getting two strikeouts. He appeared six more times during the 2006 season, getting a win in a September 20, 2006 game against the New York Yankees, getting one strikeout and giving up three hits, one walk, and one run.

Romero had season ending surgery in March 2007 and did not pitch that year. He pitched for the Syracuse Chiefs in 2008, and started 2009 with the Las Vegas 51s, the Blue Jays' Triple-A affiliate in those seasons.

After the 2020 season, he played for Panama in the 2021 Caribbean Series.

== International career ==
Romero was selected to represent Panama at the 2023 World Baseball Classic qualification.
