= Caimanes de Barranquilla =

Colombian baseball team

- Logo

Information
- League: Colombian Professional Baseball League
- Location: Barranquilla, Colombia
- Ballpark: Estadio Édgar Rentería
- Founded: 1984
- Caribbean Series championships: 1 (2022)
- League championships: 15 (1984–85, 1993–94, 1997–98, 1998–99, 2007–08, 2008–09, 2009–10, 2012–13, 2015–16, 2018–19, 2020–21, 2021–22, 2023–24, 2024–25, 2025-26)
- Former name: Caimanes de Lorica (2015–16)
- Colors: Blue, white, and red
- President: (Colombia) Jimmy Char
- Manager: (Colombia) José Mosquera
- Website: http://www.caimanesbbc.com/

Current uniforms
Home	Away

The Caimanes de Barranquilla are a baseball team in the Colombian Professional Baseball League. They have participated in the league since the 1984–85 season, playing in the 12,000-capacity Estadio Édgar Rentería in Barranquilla. Caimanes are the most successful team in Colombian baseball, having won 15 league titles, most recently during the 2025–26 season. They also won the 2022 Caribbean Series, making Colombia the first new country to win the tournament since Mexico's Naranjeros de Hermosillo won their first title in 1976.

== History ==
Caimanes was founded in 1984, during the so-called "second era" of professional Colombian baseball. The team was sponsored by Café Universal, which had previously fielded championship-winning clubs in 1982 and 1983. Managed by Cuban major leaguer José Tartabull, the first iteration of Caimanes included Jackie Gutiérrez and Tony Walker; the team won the title in its inaugural season, defeating Indios de Cartagena in six games. However, the league would fold by 1988.

In 1998, the success of Colombian-born players in Major League Baseball, most notably Édgar Rentería (who was on the 1997 world champion Florida Marlins), led to a meeting in Miami of Colombian baseball personalities including Édinson Rentería, Edgar Perez and José Martínez (who led and contributed to the development of Colombian Professional Baseball between 1979 and 1985). The meeting established a working group consisting of the businessmen involved with professional baseball in Colombia in the 1980s and new executives from the cities of Barranquilla and Cartagena. This working group was presented with a proposal to revive professional baseball in Colombia under the leadership of the Rentería family. The working group decided to move forward with the proposal, beginning the 1999–2000 season with four teams, two in Barranquilla (Caimanes and Electricos) and two in Cartagena (Tigres and Indios).

Caimanes previously played at Estadio Tomás Arrieta, until it was demolished and replaced by Estadio Édgar Rentería. During its construction, Caimanes temporarily relocated to Santa Cruz de Lorica, in the nearby Córdoba Department, for the 2015–16 season.

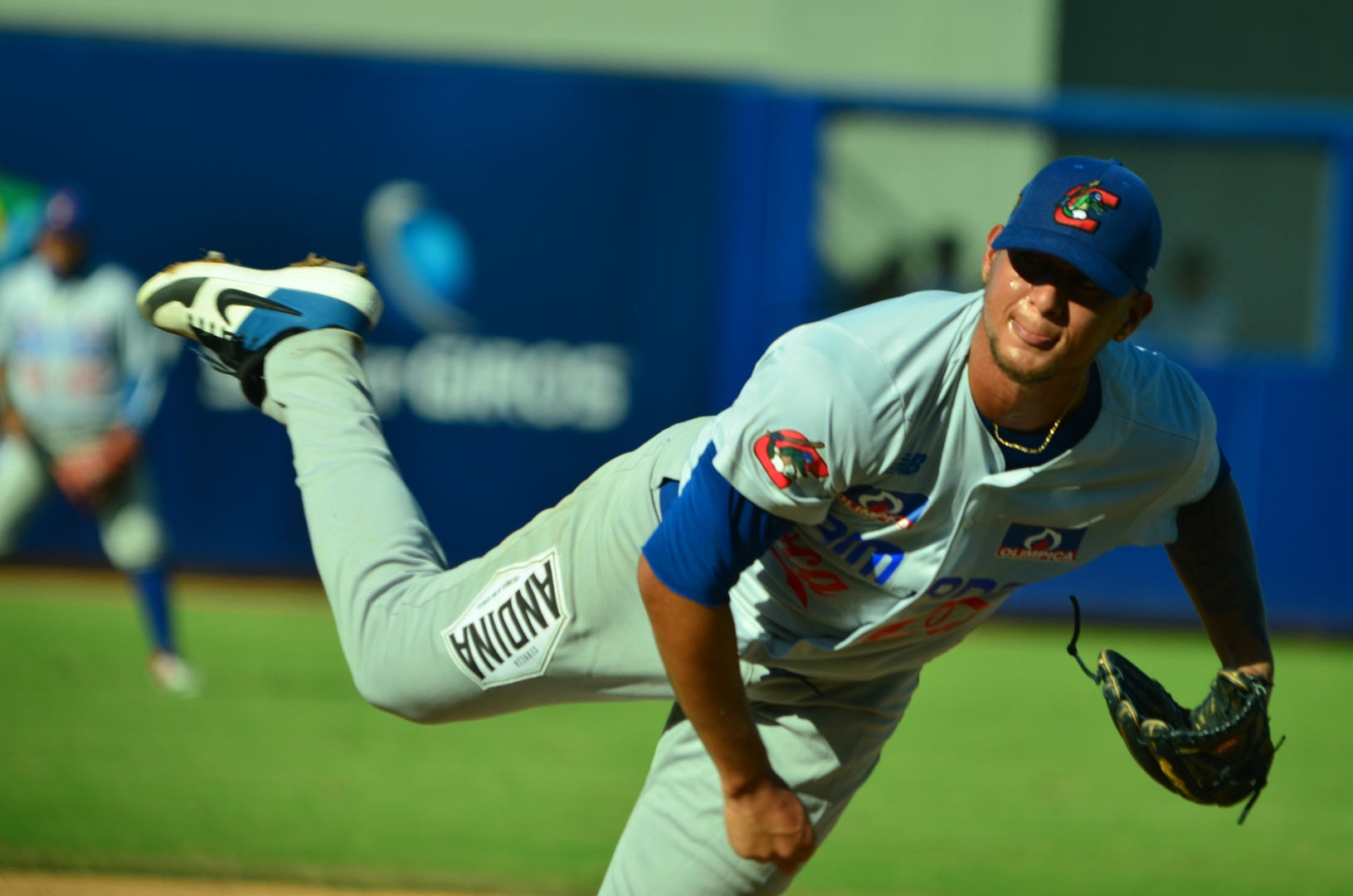
Luis Escobar with Caimanes in 2021

== Championships ==
Season	Manager	Record	Series score	Runner-up
1984–85	José Tartabull	38–22	4–2	Indios de Cartagena
1993–94	Tomás Soto	22–14	4–2	Tigres de Cartagena
1997–98	Édinson Rentería	18–13	4–1	Indios de Cartagena
1998–99	Édinson Rentería	17–7	4–2	Vaqueros de Montería
2007–08	Walter Miranda	22–20	4–0	Indios de Cartagena
2008–09	Walter Miranda	28–25	4–3	Leones de Montería
2009–10	Boris Villa	30–24	4–2	Leones de Montería
2012–13	Wilson Valera	25–16	4–2	Tigres de Cartagena
2015–16	Luis Urueta	26–16	4–2	Leones de Montería
2018–19	Fred Ocasio	29–12	4–1	Toros de Sincelejo
2020–21	José Mosquera	13–11	4–3	Tigres de Cartagena
2021–22	José Mosquera	23–13	4–1	Vaqueros de Montería
2023–24	José Mosquera	46–23	4–1	Vaqueros de Montería
2024–25	José Mosquera	26–12	4–3	Vaqueros de Montería
2025–26	Jaime del Valle	19–11	4–1	Tigres de Cartagena
Total championships			14	

== International competition ==
=== Caribbean Series ===
Year	Venue	Finish	Wins	Losses	Win%	Manager
2021	(Mexico) Mazatlán	6th	0	5	.000	(Colombia) José Mosquera
2022	(Dominican Republic) Santo Domingo	1st	5	2	.714	(Colombia) José Mosquera
Total			5	7	.417	

2022 Caribbean Series roster

Colombia 2022 Caribbean Series Roster
Players		Coaches
Pitchers: 28 (Colombia) Elkin Alcalá; 55 (Colombia) Rodrigo Benoit; 27 (Colombia) Randy Consuegra; 21 (Colombia) Luis De Ávila; 20 (Dominican Republic) Juan Díaz; 78 (Colombia) Luis Escobar; 41 (Dominican Republic) Elniery García; 67 (United States) Donald Goodson; 42 (Dominican Republic) Yaramil Hiraldo; 37 (Dominican Republic) Joel Inoa; 42 (Dominican Republic) Francisco Jiménez; 99 (Dominican Republic) Porfirio López; 16 (Dominican Republic) Eduar López; 25 (Dominican Republic) Deivy Méndez; 31 (Colombia) Luis Moreno; 69 (Colombia) Jeffry Niño; 47 (Dominican Republic) Fernando Pérez; 46 (Colombia) Ronald Ramírez; updated on 28 January 2022	Catchers: 9 (Venezuela) Sandy León; 7 (Colombia) Carlos Martínez; 2 (Colombia) Andrés Noriega; Infielders: 19 (Colombia) Carlos Arroyo; 1 (Taiwan) Tsung-Che Cheng; 77 (Colombia) Dayan Frías; 3 (Colombia) Dilson Herrera; 22 (Colombia) Mauricio Ramos; 17 (Colombia) Reynaldo Rodríguez; Outfielders: 15 (Colombia) Brayan Buelvas; 24 (Venezuela) Robinson Cabrera; 16 (Dominican Republic) Édgar Figueroa; 10 (Colombia) Harold Ramírez; 13 (Colombia) Brallan Pérez	Manager: 28 (Colombia) José Mosquera; Coaches

=== Serie de las Américas ===
Year	Host	Finish	Wins	Losses	Win%	Manager
2025	Nicaragua	6th	1	4	.200	(Colombia) Normando Linero
2026	Venezuela	2nd	4	4	.500	(Colombia) Neder Horta
Total			5	8	.385	

2025 Serie de las Américas roster

Colombia 2025 Serie de las Américas Roster
Players		Coaches
Pitchers: (Dominican Republic) Samuel Burgos; (Colombia) Randy Cuestas; (Colombia) Kevin Escorcia; (Venezuela) Alvin Herrera; (Colombia) Jean Carlos Herrera; (Dominican Republic) Deivy Méndez; (Dominican Republic) Oddy Nuñez; (Dominican Republic) Hansel Paulino; (Colombia) Dewin Pérez; (Dominican Republic) Fernando Pérez; (Dominican Republic) Luis Pérez; (Colombia) Ronald Ramírez; (Colombia) Jhon Romero; (Dominican Republic) Junior Rincón; (Dominican Republic) Alvery de los Santos; updated on 22 January 2025	Catchers: (Colombia) Ronaldo Hernández; (Colombia) Guillermo Quintana; Infielders: (Colombia) Edgar Barrios; (Venezuela) Darío Borrero; (Colombia) Fabián Pertuz; (United States) Joseph Rosa; (Dominican Republic) Estamy Ureña; Outfielders: (Venezuela) Gustavo Armas; (Dominican Republic) Alejandro De Aza; (Colombia) Dilson Herrera; (Colombia) Jesús Marriaga; (Dominican Republic) Jesús Valdez	Manager: (Colombia) Normando Linero; Coaches

2026 Serie de las Américas roster

Colombia 2026 Serie de las Américas Roster
Players		Coaches
Pitchers: 9 (Colombia) Yoryi Simarra; 7 (Venezuela) Emerson Martinez; 16 (Venezuela) Pedro Garcia; 24 (Venezuela) Yapson Gomez; 28 (Colombia) Elkin Alcala; 34 (Dominican Republic) Jose Salvador; 36 (Venezuela) Emilker Guzman; 37 (Venezuela) Henderson Álvarez; 38 (Colombia) Ezequiel Zabaleta; 46 (Dominican Republic) Luis Perez; 51 (Venezuela) Julio Vivas; 52 (Dominican Republic) Moises Diaz; 58 (Colombia) Jhon Romero; 61 (Colombia) Jean Herrera; 79 (Venezuela) Anthony Vizcaya; updated on 7 February 2026	Catchers: 15 (Colombia) Carlos Martinez; 17 (Colombia) Gabriel Lino; Infielders: 11 (Venezuela) Kelvin Melean; 12 (Colombia) Carlos Arroyo; 27 (Colombia) Jaider Morelos; 45 (Colombia) Leandro Emiliani; 81 (Venezuela) Kevin Maitán; 83 (Venezuela) Darío Borrero; Outfielders: 1 (Colombia) Derwin Pomare; 23 (Colombia) Tito Polo; 47 (Colombia) Harold Ramírez; 48 (Colombia) Andres Angulo; 51 (Colombia) Jesús Marriaga	Manager: 59 (Colombia) Neder Horta; Coaches

=== Baseball Champions League ===
Year	Venue	Finish	Wins	Losses	Win%	Manager
2023	(Mexico) Mérida	2nd	2	2	.500	(Colombia) Carlos Vidal
Total			2	2	.500	

2023 Baseball Champions League roster

Caimanes de Barranquilla roster
Players		Coaches
Pitchers: 28 (Colombia) Elkin Alcalá; 10 (Mexico) Fabián Cota; 41 (Venezuela) Jesús Fandiño; 62 (Colombia) Santiago Florez; 4 (Colombia) Rubén Galindo; 88 (United States) Jalen Miller; 32 (Colombia) Luis Moreno; 17 (Dominican Republic) Oddy Núñez; 7 (Colombia) Carlos Ocampo; 40 (Dominican Republic) Fernando Pérez; 25 (Dominican Republic) José Piña; 45 (Venezuela) Pedro Rodríguez; 31 (Dominican Republic) Yasel Santana	Catchers: 1 (Venezuela) Pabel Manzanero; Infielders: 38 (Colombia) Carlos Arroyo; 9 (Venezuela) Edwin García; 6 (Venezuela) Osman Marval; 5 (Colombia) Derwin Pomare; 18 (Mexico) Edgar Robles; 29 (Colombia) Brayan Saki; 21 (United States) Demetrius Sims; Outfielders: 23 (Colombia) Gustavo Campero; 3 (Colombia) Dilson Herrera; 52 (Colombia) Jesús Marriaga; 44 (Dominican Republic) Jesús Valdez	Manager: 8 (Colombia) Carlos Vidal; Coaches: -- (Colombia) Jhadiel Ancona (bench); 77 (Colombia) Jair Morelos (first base); 71 (Colombia) Carlos Ramón Pérez (coach); 12 (Colombia) Ronald Ramírez (pitching); -- (Colombia) Hamilton Sarabia (coach); Roster

== Notable players ==
- José Tartabull
- Jorge Alfaro
- Sandy León
- Dilson Herrera
- Harold Ramírez
- Daniel Missaki
