= Veracruz State League =

- Sport: Baseball
- Founded: 2016; 10 years ago
- Director: Narciso Elvira Delgado
- No. of teams: 4
- Country: Mexico
- Continent: North America
- Most recent champions: Tobis de Acayucan (1st title)
- Most titles: Chileros de Xalapa; Tobis de Acayucan (1 title each)
- Broadcaster: RTV

The Veracruz State League was a winter baseball league established in 2016. The league was composed of four teams, all in the Mexican state of Veracruz.

== Teams ==
Team	City	Stadium	Capacity	Founded
Arroceros de Tierra Blanca	Tierra Blanca, Veracruz	Gustavo "Burjois" Fernández	2,000	2017
Cafeteros de Coatepec	Coatepec, Veracruz	Adolfo López Mateos	2,000	2017
Chileros de Xalapa	Xalapa, Veracruz	Parque Deportivo Colón	5,000	1955
Tobis de Acayucan	Acayucan, Veracruz	Luis Díaz Flores	3,000	2006

== Champions ==
Season	Winner	Runner-up	Result
2016–17	Chileros de Xalapa	Petroleros de Minatitlán	2–0
2017	Tobis de Acayucan	Chileros de Xalapa	3–2

== Liga Veracruzana Estatal de Béisbol Championships by team ==
Rank	Team	Titles	Years won	Years Runner Up
1	Chileros de Xalapa	1	2016-17	2017
2	Tobis de Acayucan	1	2017	
3	Petroleros de Minatitlán	0		2016-17

== Defunct teams ==
Arroceros de Tierra Blanca

== See also ==
- Mexican baseball awards
