= Liga Invernal Veracruzana =

Mexican professional baseball winter league

Veracruz Winter League
- Current season, competition or edition: 2018-19 Veracruz Winter League season
- Sport: Baseball
- Founded: 2005
- No. of teams: 6
- Country: Mexico
- Continent: North America
- Most recent champion: Tobis de Acayucan (2nd title)
- Most titles: Brujos de Los Tuxtlas (6 titles)
- Qualification: Latin American Series (2013-16) (2019-)
- Website: http://www.ligainvernalveracruzana.com

The Veracruz Winter League (Spanish: Liga Invernal Veracruzana de Béisbol Profesional) is a professional baseball winter league, representing the Mexican state of Veracruz, taking place between the months of October and January. It is currently made up of 6 teams and the league champion is invited to compete in the Latin American Series.

== History ==
The league was formed in its current iteration in 2005 by the then-state governor Fidel Herrera Beltrán as a league representing an area of Mexico not covered by the other two professional leagues, with the Mexican Pacific League covering the Pacific side of the country and the Mexican League covering inland and southern Mexico, leaving Veracruz unrepresented up to that point. The league ran for eleven seasons before it was put on hold due to lack of funding, with youth competition Veracruz State League, representing the state from that point onwards. In 2018, the president of Tobis de Acayucan, Regina Vázquez Saut, announced the revival of the league, appointing herself as the commissioner, with the first game of the revived league being played on October 27, 2018.

== Current teams ==
Team	Head Coach	City	Stadium
Astros de Jáltipan	(Puerto Rico) Eddy Castro	Jáltipan, Veracruz	"Fernando López Arias"
Cafetaleros de Córdoba	(Mexico) Alberto Joachín	Heroica Córdoba, Veracruz	"Beisborama"
Cañeros de Úrsulo Galván	(Mexico) Ángel Utrera	Cempoala, Veracruz	20 de Noviembre
Chileros de Xalapa	(Mexico) Juan Carlos Hernández	Xalapa-Enríquez, Veracruz	Deportivo Colón
Rojos de Veracruz	(Mexico) Ramón Esquer	Heroica Veracruz, Veracruz	Deportivo Universitario "Beto Ávila"
Tobis de Acayucan	(Mexico) Félix Tejeda	Acayucan, Veracruz; Oluta, Veracruz	"Luis Díaz Flores"; Emiliano Zapata

=== Affiliations with Mexican League ===
Because the Veracruz Winter League is considered a lower level than the other two professional leagues in Mexico, three of the teams have affiliations with Mexican League teams:

Team	Mexican League Affiliate
Astros de Jáltipan	Unaffiliated
Cafetaleros de Córdoba	Bravos de León
Cañeros de Úrsulo Galván	Unaffiliated
Chileros de Xalapa	Acereros del Norte
Rojos de Veracruz	Diablos Rojos del México
Tobis de Acayucan	Unaffiliated

== League champions ==
Season	Champions	Series Score	Runners-up	Winning Coach
2005–06	Broncos de Cosamaloapan	4-3	Chileros de Xalapa	(Mexico) Ramón Arano
2006–07	Gallos de Santa Rosa	4-2	Dragones Rojos de Coatzacoalcos	(Mexico) Ramón Montoya
2007–08	Chileros de Xalapa	4-3	Broncos de Cosamaloapan	(Mexico) Rafael Castañeda
2008–09	Brujos de Los Tuxtlas	4-1	Gallos de Santa Rosa	(Mexico) Pedro Meré
2009–10	Brujos de Los Tuxtlas (2)	4-2	Chileros de Xalapa	(Mexico) Pedro Meré
2010–11	Chileros de Xalapa (2)	4-2	Brujos de Los Tuxtlas	(Mexico) Shammar Almeida
2011–12	Brujos de Los Tuxtlas (3)	4-1	Chileros de Xalapa	(Mexico) Pedro Meré
2012–13	Brujos de Los Tuxtlas (4)	4-1	Gallos de Santa Rosa	(Mexico) Pedro Meré
2013–14	Brujos de Los Tuxtlas (5)	4-1	Tobis de Acayucan	(Mexico) Pedro Meré
2014–15	Brujos de San Andrés Tuxtla (6)	4-1	Gallos de Santa Rosa	(Mexico) Pedro Meré
2015–16	Tobis de Acayucan	4-1	Chileros de Xalapa	(Mexico) José Ángel Chávez
2017–2018	Not held (see Veracruz State League)			
2018–19	Tobis de Acayucan (2)	4-3	Chileros de Xalapa	(Mexico) Félix Tejeda

=== Championships by Team ===
Team	Wins	Seasons
Brujos de Los Tuxtlas (defunct)	6	2008-09, 2009-10, 2011-12, 2012-13, 2013-14, 2014-15
Chileros de Xalapa	2	2007-08, 2010-11
Tobis de Acayucan	2	2015-16, 2018-19
Broncos de Cosamaloapan (defunct)	1	2005-06
Gallos de Santa Rosa (defunct)	1	2006-07

== See also ==
- Baseball in Mexico
- Latin American Series
- Mexican League
- Mexican Pacific League
- Veracruz State League
