= Leones de Barranquilla =

Colombian baseball team

- Logo

Information
- League: Colombian Professional Baseball League
- Location: Barranquilla, Colombia
- Ballpark: Estadio Édgar Rentería
- Founded: 2003 (original); 2023 (modern)
- League championships: 3 (2014–15, 2016–17, 2017–18)
- Former name: Leones de Cartagena; Leones de Montería; Leones de Santa Marta
- Colors: Blue, teal, white
- Ownership: Team Rentería USA

Current uniforms
Home	Away

Leones de Barranquilla (Barranquilla Lions) are a professional baseball team in the Colombian Professional Baseball League (LPB) based in Barranquilla. The team was originally founded in 2003 as the Leones de Cartagena before relocating to Montería and winning three championships as Leones de Montería from 2008 to 2019. The team then moved to Santa Marta for the 2019–20 season.

For the 2021–22 season, attempts were made to relocate the team to Villavicencio, according to Meta Department governor Juan Guillermo Zuluaga. However, these plans fell through, and the team did not participate in the 2021–22 season.

Leones returned to the league for the 2023–24 season under the ownership of Édinson Rentería; initially the team had hoped to return to Santa Marta, or alternatively relocate to Valledupar, but were unable to secure corporate sponsors for either move. The team was originally slated to participate in the 2025–26 season, but withdrew weeks before the tournament due to difficulties securing sponsorships. The team returned for the 2026–27 season.

== International competition ==
=== Latin American Series ===
Year	Venue	Finish	Wins	Losses	Win%	Manager
2015	Panama City	1st	3	1	.750	(Colombia) Luis Urueta
2017	(Colombia) Montería	2nd	2	2	.500	(Colombia) Jair Fernández
Total			5	3	.625	
