= Baseball at the 2019 Pan American Games – Men's team rosters =

The following is a list of rosters for each nation competing in men's baseball at the 2019 Pan American Games.

== Key ==
Pos.	Position
P	Pitcher
C	Catcher
IF	Infielder
OF	Outfielder

== Group A ==
=== Dominican Republic ===
Manager
(Dominican Republic) Pedro López

Player	Pos.	DOB and age	Team	League	Birthplace
José Acosta	P	December 23, 1993 (aged 25)			Dominican Republic
Ronny Agustin	P	September 18, 1994 (aged 24)	(Dominican Republic) Leones del Escogido	Dominican Winter League	Santo Domingo, Dominican Republic
Huascar Brazoban	P	October 15, 1989 (aged 29)	(Venezuela) Tiburones de La Guaira	Venezuelan Winter League	Villa Mella, Dominican Republic
Alexis Candelario	P	May 28, 1982 (aged 37)	(Mexico) Piratas de Campeche	Mexican League	Azua, Dominican Republic
Ranfi Casimiro	P	July 16, 1992 (aged 27)	(Dominican Republic) Águilas Cibaeñas	Dominican Winter League	Santiago, Dominican Republic
Ángel Castro	P	November 14, 1982 (aged 36)	(Dominican Republic) Toros del Este	Dominican Winter League	Pimentel, Dominican Republic
Édgar García	P	September 20, 1987 (aged 31)	(Dominican Republic) Estrellas Orientales	Dominican Winter League	Las Matas de Farfán, Dominican Republic
Jhan Mariñez	P	August 12, 1988 (aged 30)	(Dominican Republic) Toros del Este	Dominican Winter League	Santo Domingo, Dominican Republic
Ramón Morla	P	November 20, 1989 (aged 29)	(Dominican Republic) Toros del Este	Dominican Winter League	Pedro Santana, Dominican Republic
Randy Pérez	P	April 1, 1994 (aged 25)			San Cristóbal, Dominican Republic
Carlos Pimentel	P	December 1, 1989 (aged 29)	(United States) Sugar Land Skeeters	Atlantic League	Santiago, Dominican Republic
Pedro Viola	P	June 29, 1983 (aged 36)			San Juan de la Maguana, Dominican Republic
Audry Pérez	C	December 23, 1988 (aged 30)	(Dominican Republic) Estrellas Orientales	Dominican Winter League	Sabana Grande de Palenque, Dominican Republic
Alberto Rosario	C	January 10, 1987 (aged 32)	(United States) Arizona Diamondbacks (minors)	Major League Baseball	Bonao, Dominican Republic
Osvaldo Abreu	IF	June 13, 1994 (aged 25)	(United States) Washington Nationals (minors)	Major League Baseball	La Romana, Dominican Republic
Miguel Gómez	IF	December 17, 1992 (aged 26)	(Dominican Republic) Leones del Escogido	Dominican Winter League	Santo Domingo, Dominican Republic
Diego Goris	IF	November 8, 1990 (aged 28)	(Dominican Republic) Águilas Cibaeñas	Dominican Winter League	Santiago, Dominican Republic
Ronny Paulino	IF	April 21, 1981 (aged 38)	(Dominican Republic) Leones del Escogido	Dominican Winter League	Santo Domingo, Dominican Republic
Deibinson Romero	IF	September 24, 1986 (aged 32)	(United States) Long Island Ducks	Atlantic League	Pedernales, Dominican Republic
Rafael Ynoa	IF	August 7, 1987 (aged 31)	(Dominican Republic) Leones del Escogido	Dominican Winter League	Santiago, Dominican Republic
Willy García	OF	September 4, 1992 (aged 26)	(Canada) Winnipeg Goldeyes	American Association	Santo Domingo, Dominican Republic
John Mora	OF	May 31, 1993 (aged 26)	(Dominican Republic) Águilas Cibaeñas	Dominican Winter League	San Juan de la Maguana, Dominican Republic
Robelys Reyes	OF	July 25, 1990 (aged 29)	(Dominican Republic) Leones del Escogido	Dominican Winter League	Valverde, Dominican Republic
Garabez Rosa	OF	October 12, 1989 (aged 29)	(Dominican Republic) Gigantes del Cibao	Dominican Winter League	Cotuí, Dominican Republic

=== Nicaragua ===
Manager
(Nicaragua) Julio Sánchez

Player	Pos.	DOB and age	Team	League	Birthplace
Jimmy Bermúdez	P	June 21, 1981 (aged 38)	(Nicaragua) Leones de León	Nicaraguan Baseball League	Ticuantepe, Nicaragua
Wilber Bucardo	P	November 20, 1987 (aged 31)	(Nicaragua) Tigres del Chinandega	Nicaraguan Baseball League	León, Nicaragua
Berman Espinoza	P	November 4, 1987 (aged 31)	(Nicaragua) Indios del Bóer	Nicaraguan Baseball League	Matagalpa, Nicaragua
Fidencio Flores	P	September 10, 1991 (aged 27)	(Nicaragua) Indios del Bóer	Nicaraguan Baseball League	El Sauce, Nicaragua
Elvin García	P	May 14, 1990 (aged 29)	(Nicaragua) Indios del Bóer	Nicaraguan Baseball League	Estelí, Nicaragua
Jesús Garrido	P	May 10, 1995 (aged 24)	(Nicaragua) Leones de León	Nicaraguan Baseball League	Chinandega, Nicaragua
Ernesto Glasgon	P	September 14, 1991 (aged 27)	(Nicaragua) Indios del Bóer	Nicaraguan Baseball League	Caribe Sur, Nicaragua
Elías Gutiérrez	P	December 11, 1994 (aged 24)	(Nicaragua) Leones de León	Nicaraguan Baseball League	Jinotega, Nicaragua
Wilton López	P	July 19, 1983 (aged 36)			León, Nicaragua
Gustavo Martínez	P	November 9, 1975 (aged 43)	(Nicaragua) Gigantes de Rivas	Nicaraguan Baseball League	Santo Domingo, Dominican Republic
Junior Téllez	P	July 1, 1990 (aged 29)	(Nicaragua) Tigres del Chinandega	Nicaraguan Baseball League	León, Nicaragua
Luis Alen	C	April 16, 1985 (aged 34)	(Nicaragua) Leones de León	Nicaraguan Baseball League	Ciudad Bolívar, Venezuela
Rafael Estrada	C	March 5, 1993 (aged 26)	(Nicaragua) Leones de León	Nicaraguan Baseball League	Jinotega, Nicaragua
Benjamín Alegría	IF	August 6, 1997 (aged 21)	(Nicaragua) Leones de León	Nicaraguan Baseball League	Managua, Nicaragua
Darrel Campbell	IF	December 29, 1981 (aged 37)	(Nicaragua) Gigantes de Rivas	Nicaraguan Baseball League	Bluefields, Nicaragua
Ofilio Castro	IF	August 18, 1983 (aged 35)	(Nicaragua) Leones de León	Nicaraguan Baseball League	Managua, Nicaragua
Marvin Martínez	IF	April 20, 1991 (aged 28)	(Nicaragua) Tigres del Chinandega	Nicaraguan Baseball League	León, Nicaragua
Edgard Montiel	IF	January 13, 1988 (aged 31)	(Nicaragua) Tigres del Chinandega	Nicaraguan Baseball League	Managua, Nicaragua
Wuillians Vasquez	IF	July 23, 1983 (aged 36)	(Nicaragua) Leones de León	Nicaraguan Baseball League	Acarigua, Venezuela
Isaac Benard	OF	January 2, 1996 (aged 23)	(United States) Florence Freedom	Frontier League	West Richland, Washington, United States
Dwight Britton	OF	July 17, 1987 (aged 32)	(Nicaragua) Leones de León	Nicaraguan Baseball League	Corn Islands, Nicaragua
Jilton Calderón	OF	September 16, 1988 (aged 30)	(Nicaragua) Indios del Bóer	Nicaraguan Baseball League	Jinotepe, Nicaragua
Javier Robles	OF	August 10, 1994 (aged 24)	(Nicaragua) Indios del Bóer	Nicaraguan Baseball League	Masaya, Nicaragua
Norlando Valle	OF	August 2, 1994 (aged 24)	(Nicaragua) Tigres del Chinandega	Nicaraguan Baseball League	León, Nicaragua

=== Peru ===
Manager
(Cuba) Kenny Rodríguez

Player	Pos.	DOB and age	Team	League	Birthplace
Jonathan Farías	P	June 1, 1995 (aged 24)	(Peru) Leones	Peruvian Athletics Sport Federation	Venezuela
Andrés Hamamoto	P	April 23, 1990 (aged 29)	(Peru) Taiyo	Peruvian Athletics Sport Federation	Peru
José Herrera	P	March 17, 1999 (aged 20)			Venezuela
Ken Ishihara	P	April 9, 1985 (aged 34)	(Peru) Kiuyo	Peruvian Athletics Sport Federation	Peru
Edgar Paredes	P	October 25, 1996 (aged 22)	(Peru) Pumas	Peruvian Athletics Sport Federation	Peru
Gianpierre Reaños	P	April 4, 1983 (aged 36)	(Peru) Paz Soldán	Peruvian Athletics Sport Federation	Peru
Jorge Sivirichi	P	April 11, 1994 (aged 25)	(Peru) Leones	Peruvian Athletics Sport Federation	Peru
Alex Takano	P	February 22, 2001 (aged 18)	(Peru) Kiuyo	Peruvian Athletics Sport Federation	Peru
Alonso Tenya	P	June 25, 1997 (aged 22)	(United States) Mercy College	NCAA Division II	Tokyo, Japan
Jesús Vargas	P	July 25, 1998 (aged 21)			Venezuela
Kevin Yamamoto	P	August 4, 1998 (aged 20)	(Peru) Kiuyo	Peruvian Athletics Sport Federation	Peru
Ignacio Castro	C	May 27, 2000 (aged 19)	(Peru) Pumas	Peruvian Athletics Sport Federation	Peru
Jorge Pastor	C	July 27, 1994 (aged 25)	(Peru) Kiuyo	Peruvian Athletics Sport Federation	Peru
Roberto Ayarza	IF	March 30, 1996 (aged 23)	(Peru) Regional Callao	Peruvian Athletics Sport Federation	Peru
Jin Ishihara	IF	March 16, 1990 (aged 29)	(Peru) Kiuyo	Peruvian Athletics Sport Federation	Peru
Alexandre Moromizato	IF	January 25, 1996 (aged 23)	(Peru) Taiyo	Peruvian Athletics Sport Federation	Peru
Diego Uezu	IF	December 28, 1996 (aged 22)	(Peru) Kiuyo	Peruvian Athletics Sport Federation	Peru
Susumu Yoza	IF	October 7, 1988 (aged 30)	(Peru) Kiuyo	Peruvian Athletics Sport Federation	Peru
Giancarlo Kanashiro	OF	June 10, 1995 (aged 24)	(Peru) Kiuyo	Peruvian Athletics Sport Federation	Peru
Daniel Liu	OF	April 24, 1993 (aged 26)	(Peru) Taiyo	Peruvian Athletics Sport Federation	Peru
Csaba Rojas	OF	June 17, 1985 (aged 34)			Peru
José Sánchez Navarrete	OF	April 16, 1983 (aged 36)	(Peru) Leones	Peruvian Athletics Sport Federation	Peru
Daniel Shimura	OF	January 12, 1987 (aged 32)	(Peru) Kiuyo	Peruvian Athletics Sport Federation	Peru
Julio César Vásquez	OF	November 30, 1979 (aged 39)			Peru

=== Puerto Rico ===
Manager
(Puerto Rico) Juan González

Player	Pos.	DOB and age	Team	League	Birthplace
Fernando Cabrera	P	November 16, 1981 (aged 37)	(Puerto Rico) Toritos Cayey	Béisbol Doble A	Toa Baja, Puerto Rico
Freddie Cabrera	P	January 25, 1990 (aged 29)	(Puerto Rico) Arenosos Camuy	Béisbol Doble A	Moca, Puerto Rico
Luis Cintrón	P	November 15, 1989 (aged 29)	(Puerto Rico) Mulos Juncos	Béisbol Doble A	Las Piedras, Puerto Rico
Fernando Cruz	P	March 28, 1990 (aged 29)	(Puerto Rico) Maceteros Vega Alta	Béisbol Doble A	Bayamón, Puerto Rico
Bryan Escanio	P	December 17, 1991 (aged 27)	(Puerto Rico) Halcones Gurabo	Béisbol Doble A	Canóvanas, Puerto Rico
Iván Maldonado	P	June 7, 1980 (aged 39)	(Puerto Rico) Jueyeros Maunabo	Béisbol Doble A	New York, New York, United States
Miguel Martínez	P	October 22, 1982 (aged 36)	(Puerto Rico) Bravos Cidra	Béisbol Doble A	Santurce, Puerto Rico
Efraín Nieves	P	November 15, 1989 (aged 29)	(Puerto Rico) Guardianes Dorado	Béisbol Doble A	Bayamón, Puerto Rico
Orlando Román	P	November 28, 1978 (aged 40)			Bayamón, Puerto Rico
Ramesis Rosa	P	August 15, 1985 (aged 33)	(Puerto Rico) Cariduros Fajardo	Béisbol Doble A	Puerto Rico
Giovanni Soto	P	May 18, 1991 (aged 28)	(United States) New Britain Bees	Atlantic League	Carolina, Puerto Rico
Wilfredo Rodríguez	C	January 25, 1994 (aged 25)	(Puerto Rico) Poetas Juana Díaz	Béisbol Doble A	San Juan, Puerto Rico
Kevin Torres	C	February 24, 1990 (aged 29)	(Puerto Rico) Potros Santa Isabel	Béisbol Doble A	Santa Isabel, Puerto Rico
Jeffrey Domínguez	IF	July 31, 1986 (aged 32)	(Puerto Rico) Mulos Juncos	Béisbol Doble A	Carolina, Puerto Rico
Andrés López	IF	June 26, 1995 (aged 24)	(Puerto Rico) Jueyeros Maunabo	Béisbol Doble A	Aguas Buenas, Puerto Rico
Kevin Luciano	IF	July 15, 1993 (aged 26)	(Puerto Rico) Toritos Cayey	Béisbol Doble A	Cambridge, Massachusetts, United States
Ozzie Martínez	IF	May 7, 1988 (aged 31)	(United States) New Britain Bees	Atlantic League	Carolina, Puerto Rico
Luis Mateo	IF	May 23, 1990 (aged 29)	(Puerto Rico) Cariduros Fajardo	Béisbol Doble A	Bayamón, Puerto Rico
José Rivera	IF	April 18, 1990 (aged 29)	(Puerto Rico) Leones Patillas	Béisbol Doble A	Bayamón, Puerto Rico
Edwin Gómez	OF	August 26, 1991 (aged 27)	(Puerto Rico) Azucareros Yabucoa	Béisbol Doble A	Caguas, Puerto Rico
Jay González	OF	December 11, 1991 (aged 27)	(United States) New Jersey Jackals	Can-Am League	San Diego, California, United States
Brahiam Maldonado	OF	September 18, 1985 (aged 33)	(Puerto Rico) Toritos Cayey	Béisbol Doble A	Carolina, Puerto Rico
Jorge Padilla	OF	August 11, 1979 (aged 39)	(Puerto Rico) Cariduros Fajardo	Béisbol Doble A	Río Piedras, Puerto Rico
César Rivera	OF	October 1, 1992 (aged 26)	(Puerto Rico) Cocoteros Loíza	Béisbol Doble A	Loíza, Puerto Rico

== Group B ==
=== Argentina ===
Manager
(Argentina) Rolando Arnedo

Player	Pos.	DOB and age	Team	League	Birthplace
Agustín Borrino	P	September 30, 2000 (aged 18)	(Argentina) Leones de Lanús	Metropolitan Baseball League	Argentina
Rodrigo Bruera	P	April 25, 1980 (aged 39)	(Argentina) Cóndores de Córdoba	Argentine Baseball League	Argentina
Ezequiel Cufré	P	February 4, 1990 (aged 29)	(Argentina) Águilas de Salta	Argentine Baseball League	Argentina
Miguel García	P	March 24, 1989 (aged 30)	(Argentina) Falcons de Córdoba	Argentine Baseball League	Córdoba, Argentina
Diego Echeverría	P	January 1, 1983 (aged 36)	(Argentina) Infernales de Salta	Argentine Baseball League	Dolores, Buenos Aires, Argentina
Guido Monis	P	March 10, 1979 (aged 40)	(Argentina) Falcons de Córdoba	Argentine Baseball League	Argentina
Lucas Ramón	P	May 8, 1996 (aged 23)	(Argentina) Infernales de Salta	Argentine Baseball League	Argentina
Federico Robles	P	November 5, 1993 (aged 25)	(Argentina) Falcons de Córdoba	Argentine Baseball League	Argentina
Agustín Tanco	P	December 17, 1993 (aged 25)	(Argentina) Cóndores de Córdoba	Argentine Baseball League	Argentina
Federico Tanco	P	April 15, 1984 (aged 35)	(Argentina) Cóndores de Córdoba	Argentine Baseball League	Argentina
Juan Pablo Angrisano	C	April 8, 1980 (aged 39)	(Argentina) Club DAOM	Metropolitan Baseball League	Argentina
Lucas Nakandakare	C	September 18, 1987 (aged 31)	(Argentina) Club Vélez	Metropolitan Baseball League	Vicente López, Buenos Aires, Argentina
José Gerez	C	August 28, 1995 (aged 23)	(Argentina) Infernales de Salta	Argentine Baseball League	Argentina
Jacinto Cipriota	IF	March 23, 1988 (aged 31)	(Argentina) Club DAOM	Metropolitan Baseball League	Buenos Aires, Argentina
Mauricio Costa	IF	May 9, 1984 (aged 35)	(Argentina) Infernales de Salta	Argentine Baseball League	Argentina
Federico Gómez	IF	July 19, 1991 (aged 28)	(Argentina) Infernales de Salta	Argentine Baseball League	Salta, Argentina
Nicolás Solari	IF	March 18, 1988 (aged 31)	(Argentina) Club DAOM	Metropolitan Baseball League	Argentina
Exequiel Talevi	IF	October 23, 1994 (aged 24)	(Argentina) Infernales de Salta	Argentine Baseball League	Argentina
Agustín Tissera	IF	November 16, 1993 (aged 25)	(Argentina) Falcons de Córdoba	Argentine Baseball League	Córdoba, Argentina
Nicolás Arrube	OF	July 21, 1987 (aged 32)	(Argentina) Club Júpiter	Metropolitan Baseball League	Argentina
Sebastián García	OF	April 10, 1987 (aged 32)	(Argentina) Club Vélez	Metropolitan Baseball League	Argentina
Lucas Montalbetti	OF	January 27, 1983 (aged 36)	(Italy) Verona Baseball Club	Serie A2	Salta, Argentina
Mauro Schiavoni	OF	August 6, 1986 (aged 32)	(Italy) Parma Baseball Club	Italian Baseball League	Salta, Argentina
Eduardo Zurbriggen	OF	March 4, 1988 (aged 31)	(Argentina) Falcons de Córdoba	Argentine Baseball League	Argentina

=== Canada ===
Manager
(United States) Ernie Whitt

Player	Pos.	DOB and age	Team	League	Birthplace
Ben Abram	P	February 29, 2000 (aged 19)	(United States) University of Oklahoma	NCAA Division I	Georgetown, Ontario
Phillippe Aumont	P	January 7, 1989 (aged 30)	(Canada) Ottawa Champions	Can-Am League	Gatineau, Quebec
Jordan Balazovic	P	September 17, 1998 (aged 20)	(United States) Minnesota Twins (minors)	Major League Baseball	Mississauga, Ontario
Eric Cerantola	P	May 2, 2000 (aged 19)	(United States) Mississippi State University	NCAA Division I	Oakville, Ontario
RJ Freure	P	July 6, 1997 (aged 22)	(United States) Houston Astros (minors)	Major League Baseball	Burlington, Ontario
Ryan Kellogg	P	February 4, 1994 (aged 25)	(United States) Chicago Cubs (minors)	Major League Baseball	Whitby, Ontario
Chris Leroux	P	April 14, 1984 (aged 35)			Montreal, Quebec
Will McAffer	P	May 30, 1997 (aged 22)	(Canada) Toronto Blue Jays (minors)	Major League Baseball	North Vancouver, British Columbia
Dustin Molleken	P	August 21, 1984 (aged 34)	(Canada) Québec Capitales	Can-Am League	Regina, Saskatchewan
Jasvir Rakkar	P	April 27, 1991 (aged 28)			Brampton, Ontario
Scott Richmond	P	August 30, 1979 (aged 39)	(Canada) Québec Capitales	Can-Am League	Vancouver, British Columbia
Evan Rutckyj	P	January 31, 1992 (aged 27)	(Canada) Ottawa Champions	Can-Am League	Windsor, Ontario
Dustin Houle	C	November 9, 1993 (aged 25)	(United States) New York Mets (minors)	Major League Baseball	Penticton, British Columbia
Jordan Procyshen	C	March 11, 1993 (aged 26)	(United States) Los Angeles Dodgers (minors)	Major League Baseball	Calgary, Alberta
Wes Darvill	IF	September 10, 1991 (aged 27)	(Canada) Winnipeg Goldeyes	American Association	Richmond, British Columbia
Edouard Julien	IF	April 30, 1999 (aged 20)	(United States) Auburn University	NCAA Division I	Quebec, Quebec
Jordan Lennerton	IF	February 16, 1986 (aged 33)			Langley, British Columbia
Jonathan Malo	IF	September 29, 1983 (aged 35)			Joliette, Quebec
Eric Wood	IF	November 22, 1992 (aged 26)	(United States) Pittsburgh Pirates (minors)	Major League Baseball	Oshawa, Ontario
Michael Crouse	OF	November 22, 1990 (aged 28)	(United States) Somerset Patriots	Atlantic League	Port Moody, British Columbia
Tyson Gillies	OF	October 31, 1988 (aged 30)	(Canada) Québec Capitales	Can-Am League	Vancouver, British Columbia
Connor Panas	OF	February 11, 1993 (aged 26)	(Canada) Québec Capitales	Can-Am League	Etobicoke, Toronto, Ontario
Tristan Pompey	OF	March 23, 1997 (aged 22)	(United States) Miami Marlins (minors)	Major League Baseball	Mississauga, Ontario
Rene Tosoni	OF	July 2, 1986 (aged 33)			Port Coquitlam, British Columbia

=== Colombia ===
Manager
(Colombia) José Mosquera

Player	Pos.	DOB and age	Team	League	Birthplace
Horacio Acosta	P	October 24, 1990 (aged 28)	(Colombia) Caimanes de Barranquilla	Colombian Baseball League	Miami, Florida, United States
José Calero	P	March 7, 1990 (aged 29)	(Colombia) Toros de Sincelejo	Colombian Baseball League	Maracaibo, Venezuela
Hernando Chiquillo	P	December 4, 1996 (aged 22)	(Colombia) Toros de Sincelejo	Colombian Baseball League	Colombia
Randy Consuegra	P	October 14, 1989 (aged 29)	(Colombia) Caimanes de Barranquilla	Colombian Baseball League	Barranquilla, Colombia
Randy Cuentas	P	September 19, 1997 (aged 21)	(Colombia) Tigres de Cartagena	Colombian Baseball League	Cartagena, Colombia
Sugar Ray Marimón	P	September 30, 1988 (aged 30)	(Colombia) Toros de Sincelejo	Colombian Baseball League	Bocagrande, Cartagena, Colombia
Sergio Palacio	P	May 19, 1998 (aged 21)			Cartagena, Colombia
Dewin Pérez	P	September 29, 1994 (aged 24)	(Colombia) Caimanes de Barranquilla	Colombian Baseball League	Cartagena, Colombia
Ronald Ramírez	P	October 17, 1985 (aged 33)			Cartagena, Colombia
Jaider Rocha	P	May 23, 1993 (aged 26)	(Colombia) Tigres de Cartagena	Colombian Baseball League	Cartagena, Colombia
Ángel Vílchez	P	September 30, 1988 (aged 30)	(Colombia) Caimanes de Barranquilla	Colombian Baseball League	Maracaibo, Venezuela
Luis Yendis	P	July 19, 1989 (aged 30)	(Colombia) Caimanes de Barranquilla	Colombian Baseball League	Petare, Miranda, Venezuela
Christian Correa	C	May 18, 1993 (aged 26)	(United States) Kansas City T-Bones	American Association	Coconut Creek, Florida, United States
Álvaro Noriega	C	November 9, 1994 (aged 24)	(Colombia) Caimanes de Barranquilla	Colombian Baseball League	Barranquilla, Colombia
Sneider Batista	IF	September 13, 1990 (aged 28)	(Colombia) Toros de Sincelejo	Colombian Baseball League	Cartagena, Colombia
Samir Caraballo	IF	September 12, 1998 (aged 20)	(Colombia) Caimanes de Barranquilla	Colombian Baseball League	Cartagena, Colombia
Jonathan Lozada	IF	December 17, 1988 (aged 30)	(Colombia) Tigres de Cartagena	Colombian Baseball League	Cartagena, Colombia
Derwin Pomare	IF	May 11, 1995 (aged 24)	(Colombia) Tigres de Cartagena	Colombian Baseball League	San Andrés, Colombia
Milton Ramos	IF	October 26, 1995 (aged 23)	(Colombia) Tigres de Cartagena	Colombian Baseball League	Hialeah, Florida, United States
Reynaldo Rodríguez	IF	July 2, 1986 (aged 33)	(Mexico) Tigres de Quintana Roo	Mexican League	Cartagena, Colombia
Diover Ávila	OF	October 14, 1985 (aged 33)	(Colombia) Leones de Montería	Colombian Baseball League	Montería, Colombia
Steve Brown	OF	September 3, 1986 (aged 32)	(Canada) Ottawa Champions	Can-Am League	Barranquilla, Colombia
Cristián Cano	OF	February 9, 1994 (aged 25)	(Colombia) Caimanes de Barranquilla	Colombian Baseball League	Cartagena, Colombia
Efrain Contreras	OF	February 6, 1987 (aged 32)	(Colombia) Caimanes de Barranquilla	Colombian Baseball League	Maracay, Venezuela

=== Cuba ===
Manager
(Cuba) Rey Vicente Anglada

Player	Pos.	DOB and age	Team	League	Birthplace
Freddy Álvarez	P	April 29, 1989 (aged 30)	(Cuba) Naranjas de Villa Clara	Cuban National Series	Corralillo, Cuba
Pedro Ángel Álvarez	P	January 23, 1995 (aged 24)	(Cuba) Gallos de Sancti Spíritus	Cuban National Series	Sancti Spíritus, Cuba
Lázaro Blanco	P	February 23, 1986 (aged 33)	(Cuba) Alazanes de Granma	Cuban National Series	Yara, Cuba
Vladimir García	P	July 4, 1982 (aged 37)	(Canada) Québec Capitales	Can-Am League	Ciego de Ávila, Cuba
Raidel Martínez	P	October 11, 1996 (aged 22)	(Japan) Chunichi Dragons	Nippon Professional Baseball	Pinar del Río, Cuba
Frank Medina	P	October 1, 1987 (aged 31)	(Cuba) Vegueros de Pinar del Río	Cuban National Series	Pinar del Río, Cuba
Liván Moinelo	P	December 8, 1995 (aged 23)	(Japan) Fukuoka SoftBank Hawks	Nippon Professional Baseball	Pinar del Río, Cuba
Wilson Paredes	P	October 19, 1989 (aged 29)	(Cuba) Cachorros de Holguín	Cuban National Series	Holguín, Cuba
Yudiel Rodríguez	P	January 1, 1984 (aged 35)	(Cuba) Leñadores de Las Tunas	Cuban National Series	Las Tunas, Cuba
Yoanni Yera	P	October 18, 1989 (aged 29)	(Cuba) Cocodrilos de Matanzas	Cuban National Series	Matanzas, Cuba
Yosvany Alarcón	C	October 15, 1984 (aged 34)	(Cuba) Leñadores de Las Tunas	Cuban National Series	Las Tunas, Cuba
Alfredo Fadraga	C	June 6, 1999 (aged 20)	(Cuba) Tigres de Ciego de Ávila	Cuban National Series	Ciego de Ávila, Cuba
Yunior Ibarra	C	October 13, 1995 (aged 23)	(Cuba) Gallos de Sancti Spíritus	Cuban National Series	Sancti Spíritus, Cuba
Jorge Aloma	IF	January 20, 1989 (aged 30)	(Cuba) Cazadores de Artemisa	Cuban National Series	La Habana, Cuba
Carlos Benítez	IF	November 1, 1987 (aged 31)	(Cuba) Alazanes de Granma	Cuban National Series	Yara, Cuba
Raúl González	IF	July 22, 1987 (aged 32)	(Cuba) Tigres de Ciego de Ávila	Cuban National Series	Ciego de Ávila, Cuba
Yordan Manduley	IF	February 9, 1986 (aged 33)	(Canada) Québec Capitales	Can-Am League	Holguín, Cuba
César Prieto	IF	August 29, 1999 (aged 19)	(Cuba) Elefantes de Cienfuegos	Cuban National Series	Abreus, Cuba
Yordanis Samón	IF	October 19, 1981 (aged 37)	(Cuba) Industriales de La Habana	Cuban National Series	Bayamo, Cuba
Yurisbel Gracial	OF	October 14, 1985 (aged 33)	(Japan) Fukuoka SoftBank Hawks	Nippon Professional Baseball	Guantánamo, Cuba
Yoelquis Guibert	OF	August 29, 1994 (aged 24)	Avispas de Santiago de Cuba	Cuban National Series	Santiago de Cuba, Cuba
Stayler Hernández	OF	July 17, 1982 (aged 37)	(Canada) Québec Capitales	Can-Am League	La Habana, Cuba
Yuniesky Larduet	OF	November 2, 1984 (aged 34)	(Cuba) Leñadores de Las Tunas	Cuban National Series	Las Tunas, Cuba
Roel Santos	OF	September 15, 1987 (aged 31)	(Mexico) Olmecas de Tabasco	Mexican League	Niquero, Cuba
