= Antonio Ruiz (baseball) =

Cuban baseball player (born 1911)

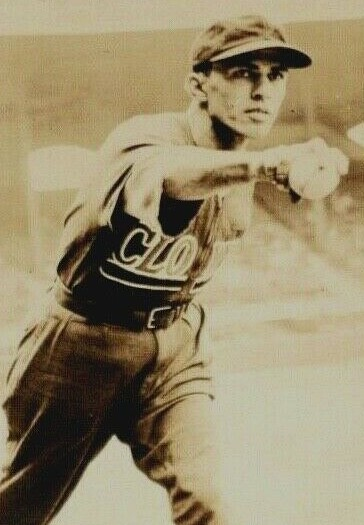
- Pitcher / Second baseman
- Born: June 17, 1911; Havana, Cuba
- Batted: Right Threw: Right

Negro league baseball debut
- 1944, for the Cincinnati-Indianapolis Clowns

Last appearance
- 1944, for the Cincinnati-Indianapolis Clowns

Negro American League statistics
- Win–loss record: 2–3
- Earned run average: 2.60
- Strikeouts: 23

Teams
- Cincinnati-Indianapolis Clowns (1944)

Antonio Ruiz Pérez (born June 17, 1911, date of death unknown), nicknamed "Loco", was a Cuban professional baseball pitcher and second baseman who played in the Negro leagues and the Mexican League, as well as in minor league baseball, in the 1940s and 1950s.

A native of Havana, Cuba, Ruiz played for the Indianapolis–Cincinnati Clowns of the Negro American League in 1944. He then played for the minor league Statesville Cubs in 1945 before going to Mexico and playing for Algodoneros de Unión Laguna in 1946. In 1947 and 1948, Ruiz played for the Juarez Indios/Mesa Orphans, didn't play baseball in 1949, then played for the Indios again in 1950. He played for the Tucson Cowboys in 1951, then went back to the Indios for part of 1952 before finishing the season with the Odessa Oilers.

Ruiz managed the Colombia national baseball team at the 1953 Amateur World Series in Caracas. He also managed in the Colombian Professional Baseball League, replacing longtime Indios de Cartagena boss Juan González Cornet. Ruiz remained in Colombia and coached in the country's domestic amateur league, into the 1970s, skippering the departmental teams of Atlántico and Bolivar.
