= Indios de Cartagena =

Former Colombian baseball club

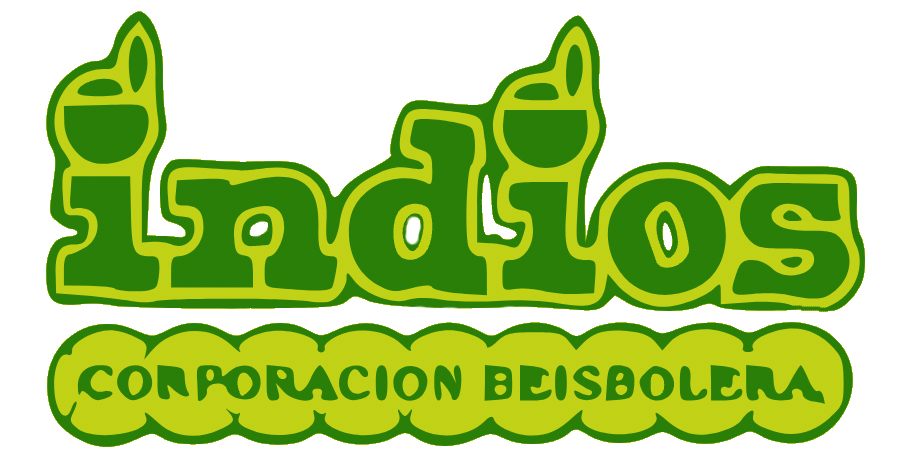
- Logo

Information
- League: Colombian League
- Established: 1948
- Disbanded: 2017
- League championships: 7 (1948, 1950, 1952, 1955–56, 1979–80, 1980–81 and 1987–88)
- Colors: Dark green, green, white, red

Indios de Cartagena (Cartagena Indians) were a baseball team active in the Colombian Professional Baseball League. Founded in the league's inaugural 1948 season by Juan González Cornet, the team was one of the most successful in Colombian baseball.

== History ==
Indios was the first professional baseball team in Colombia, founded in March 1948 by Juan González Cornet and sponsored by Cigarillos Piel Roja (lit. Redskin Cigarettes); it gained its name from Pielroja's mascot, a stereotypical North American Indian. Indios was crowned champion of the inaugural 1948 season. During this era, Indios was the "criollo" team, made up of all-Colombian players, as opposed to other teams including its crosstown rival Torices that used foreign players. The team won three more titles in the so-called first era of Colombian baseball, the last in 1955–56, before the league ceased operations in 1958.

When Colombian professional baseball started again in 1979, Indios returned and immediately won two championships back to back, in 1980 and 1981. During this period, it was headlined by "Los Ñatos" (The Snub-Nosed Ones), shortstops Orlando Ramírez and Carlos Velázquez. Indios won their last title in the 1987–88 season, though that would be the last season of professional baseball until the mid-1990s.

After the professional league was reformed, several teams briefly assumed the Indios name, starting the 1996–97 season and going until 2001–02 season. Jolbert and Orlando Cabrera bought the Tigres de Cartagena team and briefly renamed them the Indios in 2007–08, but the franchise would return to the Tigres name the following year. Tigres changed their name to Indios again for the 2016–17 season, maintaining the same management and players, but again reversed the decision after one season.

== Record ==
Indios de Cartagena season-by-season record
Season	Finish	Won	Lost	Win %	GB	Postseason	Manager	Ref
1948	1st	11	7	.611	–	–	Juan González Cornet	
1949	3rd	15	12	.556	5.5	–	Juan González Cornet	
1950	1st	32	17	.653	–	–	Juan González Cornet	
1951	2nd	16	14	.533	2	–	Juan González Cornet	
1952	1st	29	13	.690	–	–	Juan González Cornet	
1953	3rd	21	31	.404	14	–	Juan González Cornet	
1953–54	2nd	33	27	.550	1	Lost in Finals (Torices) 4–1	Juan González Cornet	
1954–55	4th	25	39	.391	15	Missed playoffs	Antonio Ruiz	
1955–56	2nd	33	32	.508	6	Won in Finals (Vanytor) 4–0	Gaspar del Monte	
1956–57	4th	26	40	.394	11	Missed playoffs	Gaspar del Monte	
1957–58	4th	22	38	.367	13	Missed playoffs	Quincy Trouppe	
1979–80	4th	18	32	.360	13.5	Won Finals (Torices) 4–2	José Martínez	
1980–81	2nd	34	26	.567	1	Won Finals (Olímpica) 4–3	Rigoberto Mendoza	
1981–82	5th	18	42	.300	20	Missed playoffs	Rigoberto Mendoza	
1982–83	5th	23	41	.359	16	Missed playoffs		
1983–84	4th	26	34	.433	13	Missed playoffs	Mike Brito	
1984–85	3rd	27	33	.450	11	Lost in Finals (Cafe Universal) 4–2	Wilfredo Calviño	
1987–88	1st	29	20	.592	–	Won Finals (Rancheros) 4–1	Curtis Wallace	
1996–97	1st	18	30	.375	12.5	Missed playoffs		
1997–98	1st	21	10	.677	4	Lost in Finals (Caimanes) 4–1		
1998–99	2nd	13	11	.542	4	Lost in Semifinals (Vaqueros) 4–0		
1999–2000	1st	14	13	.519	–	Lost in Finals (Vaqueros) 4–2	Dan Norman	
2000–01	4th	11	19	.367	9.5	Missed playoffs	Remy Hermoso	
2007–08	3rd	25	28	.472	8	Lost in Finals (Caimanes) 4–0	Nilson Robledo	
2016–17	4th	16	25	.390	6.5	Missed playoffs	Jolbert Cabrera	

== Notable players ==
- Carlos Rodríguez
- Joe Lonnett
- Seth Morehead
- Horace Garner
- Orlando Ramírez
- Reggie Williams
- Mariano Duncan
- Carlos Velázquez
- Vance Lovelace
- Orestes Destrade
- José González
- Mark Funderburk
- Dan Norman (mgr)
- Chadwick Tromp
- Jolbert Cabrera (mgr)
