= Pedro Pagés =

Pedro Pagés may refer to:

- Pedro Pagés (catcher), born 1998, Venezuelan baseball catcher
- Pedro Pagés (outfielder), born 1914, Cuban baseball outfielder
