= Noé Maduro =

Venezuelan baseball coach (born 1948)

- Manager
- Born: August 15, 1948 (age 78); Maracaibo, Zulia
- Bats: Right Throws: Right

Noé Leví Maduro Romero (born August 15, 1948) is a Venezuelan former professional baseball coach and scout. He was the longtime third base coach for the Águilas del Zulia, which he briefly managed, and also served managerial stints in the Colombian Professional Baseball League (LPBC) and the Mexican Baseball League (LMB).

== Career ==
Maduro coached the Águilas de Zulia over the course of 19 years, assuming the role of manager after the firing of Rubén Amaro in the 1996–97 season. During this period, he also served as a scout for the Philadelphia Phillies for four years and the Chicago Cubs for 11.

He managed in Colombia over the course of four seasons with the Vaqueros de Barranquilla (later the Electricos de Barranquilla), winning two championships (2000 and 2001) and losing another two. He went on to pilot the Colombia national baseball team at the 2006 Central American and Caribbean Games, held in Cartagena. After his tenure in Colombia, he managed the Leones de León of the Nicaraguan Professional Baseball League, but was fired partway through the season.

In the Mexican League, he managed the Cafeteros de Córdoba in the 2001 season, until being replaced partway through the season by Gilberto Reyes. He went on to manage El Águila de Veracruz in the 2004 season. Maduro again returned to managed the Potros de Tijuana in the 2008 season.
