= Kola Román =

Colombian soft drink

- Type: Soft drink
- Manufacturer: Coca-Cola FEMSA (licensed from Industrias Román)
- Origin: Cartagena, Colombia
- Introduced: 1865
- Color: Red
- Flavor: Sweet, vanilla
- Related products: Champagne soda, Inca Kola, Irn-Bru

Kola Román is a Colombian carbonated soft drink created in 1865 in Cartagena de Indias. Produced continuously since the late 19th century, it is among the oldest commercial soda brands in the world. Originally formulated as a champagne-style soda, the beverage was reformulated in 1936 to its current red color and vanilla-flavored profile. It has a strong regional association with Colombia's Caribbean coast and has been manufactured and distributed nationwide under license by Coca-Cola FEMSA since the late 20th century.

== History ==
=== Origins ===
The beverage traces its origin to the Román family of Cartagena, whose patriarch, the Spanish chemist Manuel Román y Picón, operated a commercial apothecary (Botica Román) in the city during the 19th century. In the 1860s, his sons Carlos, Henrique Luis, and Antonio Román Polanco imported carbonation machinery from England, beginning local production of aerated waters and fruit-flavored beverages. Carlos Román Polanco eventually took over the soft drink enterprise, formally introducing the beverage in 1865.

In its earliest form, the soda was pale in color and resembled traditional champagne soda. Consumption grew slowly initially, as carbonated soft drinks were novel in the region, but the brand gradually established a dominant market share on the Caribbean coast under the company name Industrias Román S.A.

=== 1936 reformulation ===
During the 1920s, Kola Román faced market competition in Cartagena from a local competitor named "Kola Walter". In response, Laboratorios Román S.A. commissioned chemist Henrique Pío Román del Castillo and technician Luis Carrillo to revise the recipe. Following laboratory work, the team introduced a revised formula in 1936, which changed the soda's flavor to a sweeter profile with prominent vanilla notes and gave the beverage its characteristic bright red color. This 1936 formulation became the permanent recipe for the drink.

=== Corporate partnerships and distribution ===
In 1970, bottling operations in Cartagena and Barranquilla merged under the Industrias Román banner. In 1982, Industrias Román signed a 15-year licensing agreement with the local Coca-Cola bottling network in Colombia, which permitted the multinational network to bottle and distribute Kola Román while keeping the original branding and formula intact. The franchise bottling rights subsequently transferred to Mexican multinational Coca-Cola FEMSA, which continues to manufacture and market the brand across Colombia.

== Characteristics and cultural role ==
Kola Román is carbonated and clear ruby-red in appearance. Despite the word "kola" in its name, it contains no kola nut flavor, sharing sensory characteristics with red cream sodas and Latin American champagne colas.

The drink is closely identified with the culture and cuisine of Cartagena and the wider Caribbean region of Colombia. It is used as a base for street beverages such as raspados (shaved ice) and frozen bolis, and serves as a cooking liquid for plátano en tentación, a regional dish of ripe plantains simmered with soda, butter, and cinnamon. It is also colloquially paired with salted bread and sausage (salchichón) as a quick meal known locally as sancocho de tienda.

== Sports sponsorship ==
Kola Román sponsored several baseball teams in the Colombian Professional Baseball League, beginning in the 1950s. The Kola Román baseball club, based at the Estadio Once de Noviembre in Cartagena, won the league championship during the 1956–57 season under manager Frank "Skeeter" Scalzi; the roster featured several New York Yankees minor league players, including Lloyd Merritt and Ken Guettler. For the 1957–58 season, the team was affiliated with the Chicago White Sox and rostered Don Bacon.

In the 1990s, the brand sponsored the Vaqueros de Montería.

=== Season-by-season records ===
Kola Román Tigers regular-season record
Season	Finish	Wins	Losses	Win%	GB	Manager	Ref
1955–56	4th	26	38	.406	12.5	(Cuba) Pedro Pagés	
1956–57	1st	37	29	.561	—	(United States) Frank Scalzi	
1957–58	3rd	31	29	.517	4	(United States) Frank Scalzi	
Totals		94	96	.495	All-time regular season record		

== See also ==
- List of soft drinks by country#Colombia
- Colombiana
