= 2020 Caribbean Series =

2020 baseball tournament

Tournament details
- Country: Puerto Rico
- City: San Juan
- Venue: 1 (in 1 host city)
- Dates: February 1, 2020 – February 7, 2020
- Teams: 6

Final positions
- Champions: (Dominican Republic) Toros del Este (1st title)
- Runners-up: (Venezuela) Cardenales de Lara

The 2020 Caribbean Series (Serie del Caribe) was the 62nd edition of the international competition featuring the champions of the Colombian Professional Baseball League, Dominican Professional Baseball League, Mexican Pacific League, Panamanian Professional Baseball League, Puerto Rican Professional Baseball League, and Venezuelan Professional Baseball League. It took place from February 1 to 7, 2020 at Hiram Bithorn Stadium in San Juan, Puerto Rico.

The 2020 edition marked the first-ever appearance of Colombia in the Series, and therefore featured six teams for the second consecutive year. They replaced Cuba in the circuit, who was unable to compete due to an inability to secure travel visas in time for the competition.

The Toros del Este of the Dominican Professional Baseball League won the tournament, which was their first Series championship and the 20th overall for the Dominican Republic.

== Format ==
The Preliminary Round consisted of a fifteen-game round robin, after which the top 4 teams advanced to the Semifinal Round (1st vs. 4th, 2nd vs. 3rd). The winners of the semifinal games then squared off in the Final.

== Participating teams ==
Team	Means of qualification
(Colombia) Vaqueros de Montería	Winners of the 2019–20 Colombian Professional Baseball League
(Mexico) Tomateros de Culiacán	Winners of the 2019–20 Mexican Pacific League
(Panama) Astronautas de Chiriquí	Winners of the 2019–20 Panamanian Professional Baseball League
(Puerto Rico) Cangrejeros de Santurce	Winners of the 2019–20 Puerto Rican Professional Baseball League
(Dominican Republic) Toros del Este	Winners of the 2019–20 Dominican Professional Baseball League
(Venezuela) Cardenales de Lara	Winners of the 2019–20 Venezuelan Professional Baseball League

== Preliminary round ==
Pos	Team	Pld	W	L	RF	RA	RD	PCT	GB	Qualification
1	(Dominican Republic) Toros del Este	5	4	1	17	11	+6	.800 (Note: Head-to-head, TQB: Toros 1−1, 0.013; Cardenales 1−1, 0.000; Tomateros 1−1, −0.026)	—	Advance to knockout stage
2	(Venezuela) Cardenales de Lara	5	4	1	20	15	+5	.800	—	Advance to knockout stage
3	(Mexico) Tomateros de Culiacán	5	4	1	22	11	+11	.800	—	Advance to knockout stage
4	(Puerto Rico) Cangrejeros de Santurce (H)	5	2	3	15	17	−2	.400	2	Advance to knockout stage
5	(Panama) Astronautas de Chiriquí	5	1	4	8	16	−8	.200	3	
6	(Colombia) Vaqueros de Montería	5	0	5	6	18	−12	.000	4	

Source: MLB
Rules for classification: 1) Wins; 2) Head-to-head matches; 3) Team quality balance; 4) Batting average; 5) Drawing of lots.
(H) Hosts
Notes:

Time zone: Atlantic Standard Time (UTC–4)

Date	Time	Away	Result	Home	Stadium
February 1	10:00	Vaqueros de Montería (Colombia)	4–6	(Venezuela) Cardenales de Lara	Hiram Bithorn Stadium
February 1	14:30	Tomateros de Culiacán (Mexico)	1–2	(Dominican Republic) Toros del Este	Hiram Bithorn Stadium
February 1	20:00	Astronautas de Chiriquí (Panama)	3–4 (10)	(Puerto Rico) Cangrejeros de Santurce	Hiram Bithorn Stadium
February 2	11:00	Vaqueros de Montería (Colombia)	0–1	(Panama) Astronautas de Chiriquí	Hiram Bithorn Stadium
February 2	15:30	Cangrejeros de Santurce (Puerto Rico)	2–4	(Mexico) Tomateros de Culiacán	Hiram Bithorn Stadium
February 2	20:30	Cardenales de Lara (Venezuela)	3–2	(Dominican Republic) Toros del Este	Hiram Bithorn Stadium
February 3	10:00	Astronautas de Chiriquí (Panama)	1–6	(Mexico) Tomateros de Culiacán	Hiram Bithorn Stadium
February 3	14:30	Toros del Este (Dominican Republic)	4–0	(Colombia) Vaqueros de Montería	Hiram Bithorn Stadium
February 3	20:00	Cangrejeros de Santurce (Puerto Rico)	2–3 (10)	(Venezuela) Cardenales de Lara	Hiram Bithorn Stadium
February 4	10:00	Astronautas de Chiriquí (Panama)	3–4	(Dominican Republic) Toros del Este	Hiram Bithorn Stadium
February 4	14:30	Tomateros de Culiacán (Mexico)	7–6	(Venezuela) Cardenales de Lara	Hiram Bithorn Stadium
February 4	20:00	Vaqueros de Montería (Colombia)	2–3	(Puerto Rico) Cangrejeros de Santurce	Hiram Bithorn Stadium
February 5	10:00	Cardenales de Lara (Venezuela)	2–0	(Panama) Astronautas de Chiriquí	Hiram Bithorn Stadium
February 5	14:30	Vaqueros de Montería (Colombia)	0–4	(Mexico) Tomateros de Culiacán	Hiram Bithorn Stadium
February 5	20:00	Toros del Este (Dominican Republic)	5–4	(Puerto Rico) Cangrejeros de Santurce	Hiram Bithorn Stadium

== Knockout stage ==
Semi-finals
3	(Mexico) Tomateros de Culiacán	0
2	(Venezuela) Cardenales de Lara	1
4	(Puerto Rico) Cangrejeros de Santurce	3
1	(Dominican Republic) Toros del Este	4

Final
2	(Venezuela) Cardenales de Lara	3
1	(Dominican Republic) Toros del Este	9

=== Semi-finals ===
Date	Time	Away	Result	Home	Stadium
February 6	14:30	Tomateros de Culiacán (Mexico)	0–1	(Venezuela) Cardenales de Lara	Hiram Bithorn Stadium
February 6	20:00	Cangrejeros de Santurce (Puerto Rico)	3–4	(Dominican Republic) Toros del Este	Hiram Bithorn Stadium

=== Final ===
February 7, 2020 20:00 at Hiram Bithorn Stadium in San Juan, Puerto Rico
Team	1	2	3	4	5	6	7	8	9	R	H	E
(Venezuela) Cardenales de Lara	0	0	0	1	0	0	2	0	0	3	9	0
(Dominican Republic) Toros del Este	0	0	1	2	2	1	0	3	0	9	12	0

== Awards ==
All-Tournament Team
Position	Player
Starting Pitcher	(Mexico) Édgar Torres
Relief Pitcher	(Dominican Republic) Ramón Ramírez
Catcher	(Mexico) Alí Solís
First Baseman	(Mexico) Joey Meneses
Second Baseman	(Mexico) Ramiro Peña
Third Baseman	(Puerto Rico) Emmanuel Rivera
Shortstop	(Venezuela) Alí Castillo
Outfielders	(Dominican Republic) Rubén Sosa (United States) Rico Noel (Puerto Rico) Henry Ramos
Designated Hitter	(Dominican Republic) Jordany Valdespin
