= Néder Horta =

Colombian baseball coach (born 1967)

- Manager
- Born: May 23, 1967 (age 59); Cartagena, Colombia
- Bats: Right Throws: Right

Néder de Jesús Horta Arrieta (born May 23, 1967) is a Colombian former professional baseball player and manager. He has previously managed the Colombia national baseball team and in the Colombian Professional Baseball League.

Horta was signed as an international free agent by the New York Yankees, and spent the 1985 season with the Gulf Coast Yankees, hitting .245. In the offseason, he was traded to the Houston Astros to complete the Sept. 15 deal for Joe Niekro. He spent the next three seasons in the Astros minor league system. Horta's best season was 1986, slashing .223/.349/.280 for the Asheville Tourists.

As manager of the Colombia national team, Horta led the country to its first Pan American Games berth in 32 years, after qualifying through the 2015 South American Baseball Championship. He coached the team in the lead-up to the 2020 Olympic qualifiers, held in May 2021, but was controversially excluded from the roster. Horta was on the coaching staff at the 2017 World Baseball Classic and at the 2023 Pan American Games, where Colombia won the gold medal.

Horta is the manager with the second most championships in the Colombian Professional Baseball League, with three; he won twice with Tigres de Cartagena (2005–06 and 2006–07) and once with Toros de Sincelejo (2011–12). Horta also piloted the Caimanes de Barranquilla in 2017, and again at the 2026 Serie de las Américas, reaching the finals (losing to Navegantes del Magallanes). He returned to manage Tigres in 2021 and again in 2025, losing in that year's finals to Caimanes.
