= Toros de Sincelejo =

Colombian baseball team

Information
- League: Colombian Professional Baseball League
- Location: Sincelejo, Colombia
- Ballpark: Estadio 20 de Enero
- League championships: 1 (2011–12)
- Colors: Green, gold, white

Toros de Sincelejo (English: Sincelejo Bulls) is a professional baseball team that competes in the Colombian Professional Baseball League (LPB), representing the city of Sincelejo, Sucre Department. The team's main rivals are the Vaqueros de Montería, with whom Sincelejo contests the clásico sabanero.

Toros won their sole championship under manager Néder Horta in the 2011–12 season; that team included future major leaguer Dilson Herrera, as well as several imports from the Japanese independent leagues.

In 2025, the team was bought by Canadian-American investor Brandon Austin for $1.2 million; the league approved the purchase with the stipulation that Austin keep the franchise in Sincelejo for a minimum of ten years. Austin's touted priorities included advanced analytics, e-commerce, and international exposure. Ahead of the 2025–26 season, the team entered a development agreement with the Pittsburgh Pirates.

== Championships ==
Season	Manager	Record	Series score	Runner-up
2011–12	Néder Horta	25–17	5–3	Leones de Montería
Total championships			14	
