= Club DAOM =

Argentine sports club

DAOM
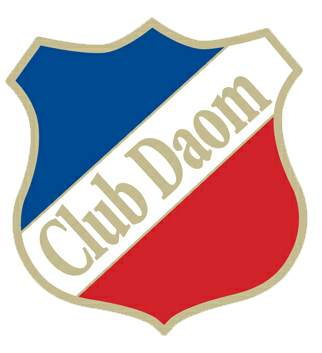
- Full name: Club Dirección Autárquica de Obras Municipales
- Founded: 12 October 1927; 98 years ago
- Ground: Av. Varela and Castañares, Flores, Buenos Aires
- Location: Buenos Aires, Argentina
- League(s): URBA (Rugby); Metropolitano (Hockey); LAB (Baseball)
- Affiliations: URBA (Rugby); AHBA (Hockey)
- Activities: List: baseball; field hockey; roller skating; rugby union; tennis; volleyball
- President: Fabio Espinal
- Colours
- Website: daom.com.ar

Club DAOM, or simply DAOM (an acronym for "Dirección Autárquica de Obras Municipales"), is an Argentine amateur sports club located in the Flores neighborhood of Buenos Aires. The club hosts a variety of sports and activities such as baseball, field hockey, roller skating, rugby union, tennis and volleyball.

The baseball team plays in the Argentine Baseball League (LAB); the rugby union team currently plays in Primera C, the fourth division of the URBA league system. DAOM also has a women's rugby team competing in "Torneo Femenino" organised by the same body, having been one of the first Argentine clubs to field a women's team.

== History ==
The club was founded in 1927 by workers and employees of the "Preservation Section and Tramway of Buenos Aires", a division area of the Municipality of Buenos Aires. The institution was primarily named "Club Atlético Conservación y Tranvías". After being founded, the members of the club searched for a place where to settle. After visiting many places within the city of Buenos Aires, they finally chose a land located at the intersection of Varela and Castañares streets, in the South East of the city.

Rugby kit

Once the land was acquired, the club members started to work on the construction of the facilities, being helped by the Municipality which collaborated with the project. The first step was to build a football pitch, a locker room, and other minor buildings. In 1936 the club changed its name to "Club Ente Autónomo de Industria Municipal", which lasted until 1943 when the acronym DAOM (which referred to "Dirección Autárquica de Obras Municipales") was approved as the definitive name of the institution.

From 1943 to date DAOM has built the swimming pool, the gym and fields for different sports. DAOM was also a pioneer of baseball in Argentina, being the first club to have a baseball-specific stadium in the country.

Rugby union was added in July 1950, when the club played its first match. Three years later, DAOM inaugurated its first rugby venue on Avenida Castañares. The red, white, and blue shirt was adopted in the 1960s. As of 2018, DAOM had about 60 rugby players.

=== Baseball section ===
DAOM Beisbol
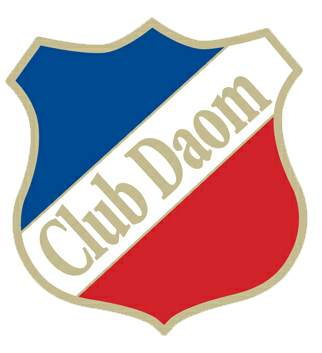

Logo	Cap insignia

Information
- League: Argentine Baseball League
- Location: Buenos Aires
- Ballpark: Estadio Club DAOM
- League championships: 2 (2024, 2025)

Current uniforms
Home	Away

Baseball started to be practised at DAOM in 1947. Two years later the "Argentine Baseball and Softball League" was created and soon organized a first division championship. Some of the institutions invited to the tournament were Gimnasia y Esgrima and DAOM. A second division (formed by the same teams taking part at primera) was also created to increase the level of the tournaments.

DAOM won its first title in 1951, the second disputed by the team. The institution has won a large number of championships since then, becoming one of the most successful baseball clubs of Argentina. DAOM won their last championship in 2025, after defeating Patriots in the finals.

DAOM also had the first ballpark of Argentina.

== International competition ==
=== Serie de las Américas ===
Year	Host	Finish	Wins	Losses	Win%	Manager
2025	Nicaragua	5th	1	4	.200	(Argentina) Fabricio Curtti
2026	Venezuela	6th	2	4	.333	(Argentina) Darío Martín
Total			3	8	.273	
