= Ronald Ramírez (baseball) =

Colombian baseball coach (born 1967)

Tigres de Cartagena
- Infielder / Manager
- Born: January 30, 1986 (age 40); Cartagena, Colombia
- Bats: Right Throws: Right

Ronald Ramírez de la Rosa (born January 30, 1986) is a Colombian professional baseball player coach and former player. He serves as a coach in the Arizona Diamondbacks organization and is the current manager of Tigres de Cartagena in the Colombian Professional Baseball League (LPBC).

Ramírez was signed as an international free agent by the Houston Astros, where he played from 2004 to 2009, reaching High-A with the Lancaster JetHawks in 2009. In 2011 he was signed by the St. Louis Cardinals organization, playing a single season in the Florida State League. He played 13 seasons in the Colombian winter league: ten with Tigres de Cartagena, two with Caimanes de Barranquilla and one (2010-11) with Águilas de Bogotá.

His first experience as a manager was in the 2017–18 LPBC season, taking over as skipper of the Tigres de Cartagena following the departure of Ender Chávez. He was on the coaching staff of the Caimanes de Barranquilla in 2018, 2019 and 2021. In 2022, he was appointed manager of the Vaqueros de Montería, leading the team to a league championship and a berth in the 2023 Caribbean Series. He led the team to the final series again in 2025, falling short to Caimanes. Ahead of the 2026–27 season, he was appointed manager of the Tigres.

In 2026, Ramírez was appointed bench coach for the Amarillo Sod Poodles, the Diamondbacks' Double-A affiliate; the team won the Texas League championship that year.
