= Metropolitano de Hockey =

Metropolitano de Hockey may refer to:

- Metropolitano de Hockey (Men)
- Metropolitano de Hockey (Women)
