= Juan González Cornet =

Colombian baseball executive

- Manager
- Born: September 17, 1917; Panama
- Died: January 8, 1973 (aged 55); San Andrés, Colombia

Juan González Cornet (Note: alternatively, Cornett.) (17 September 1917 — 8 January 1973) was a Panamanian-born Colombian businessman and baseball executive who was one of the founders of the original Colombian Professional Baseball League in 1948.

González Cornet was born in Panama, where his father worked in the Panama Canal Zone; when he was five years old, the family relocated to Cartagena. He owned a restaurant and farming interests in addition to the Indios de Cartagena, originally an amateur baseball club. He was also manager of the Indios. González Cornet, of Cartagena, managed to heal a rift between business interests in Cartagena and Barranquilla, who had proposed their own professional baseball league, in order to found a single unified professional baseball league in the country. He managed the Indios to three championships in 1948, 1950, and 1952, and remained a prominent figure in the Colombian professional baseball world until a currency exchange crisis caused the first iteration of the league to fold in 1958.

He was on the coaching staff for the Colombia national baseball team, managed by Andrés “Venao” Flórez, at the 1944 Amateur World Series in Caracas. González Cornet managed Colombia at the 1952 Latin American Series, held in Caracas.

González Cornet died in 1973 on the island of San Andrés, where a baseball stadium was named in his honor.
