= Argentine Baseball League =

Sports league in Argentina

- Current season, competition or edition: 2024 Argentine Baseball League season
- Sport: Baseball
- Founded: 2017
- No. of teams: 6
- Country: Argentina
- Continent: South America
- Most recent champion: Daom de Buenos Aires (2nd title)
- Most titles: Daom de Buenos Aires (2 titles)
- Qualification: Serie de las Américas
- Website: https://beisbol.ar/ligas-nacionales/

The Argentine Baseball League (Spanish: Liga Argentina de Béisbol) is the professional baseball league of Argentina. The league was established in 2017. As of the 2018 season, the LAB consists of six teams, representing five different sports clubs.

== History ==
The league was formed in 2017 by two local associations: Federación Cordobesa de Béisbol representing the Córdoba Province, and Liga Salteña de Béisbol, representing the Salta Province. The league was formed to allow Argentina to be represented on the international baseball stage and following affiliation with the Latin American Professional Baseball Association, the league champion is invited to compete in the Latin American Series.

== Current teams ==
Location of the member teams

Club	City	Stadium	Capacity	Joined	Notes
Popeye de Salta	Salta	Estadio Popeye Béisbol Club	1,200	2017	(Note: Previously known as Infernales de Salta)
DAOM de Buenos Aires	Buenos Aires	Estadio Club DAOM			
Cachorros de Salta	Salta	Estadio Cachorros		2017	(Note: Previously known as Águilas de Salta.)
Falcons de Córdoba	Córdoba	Estadio Club Dolphins	12,000	2017	
Arias de Córdoba	Córdoba	Estadio Camping Gral. San Martín		2017	(Note: Previously known as Cóndores de Córdoba)
Patriots de Buenos Aires	Buenos Aires	Estadio Nacional de Béisbol			

Unlike many other professional baseball leagues, the team nickname does not match the name of the sports club it represents, and on the uniforms themselves, it is the club's name which is written, with the nicknames acting as a way of differentiating between teams from the same sports club.

== League champions ==
Season	Champion	Manager	Final Series	Runner-up	Ref
2017	Infernales de Salta	Federico Bisbal	3–0	Falcons de Córdoba	
2018	Falcons de Córdoba	Darío Martín	3–2	Cóndores de Córdoba	
2019	Infernales de Salta (2)	Gabriel Sansó	3–1	Falcons de Córdoba	
Not held in 2020 due to the COVID-19 pandemic
2021	Falcons de Córdoba (2)	Darío Martín	3–0	Pumas de Córdoba	
2022	Falcons de Córdoba (3)		3–1	Águilas de Salta	
2023	Popeye de Salta (3)	Gabriel Sansó	4–2	Falcons de Córdoba	
2024	Daom de Buenos Aires	Fabricio Curtti	8–2	Patriots de Buenos Aires	
2025	Daom de Buenos Aires (2)	Fabricio Curtti	2–1	Patriots de Buenos Aires	

== See also ==
- Latin American Series
- Serie de las Américas
- Argentina national baseball team
