= Federación de Béisbol Aficionado de Puerto Rico =

Puerto Rican amateur baseball league

- Sport: Baseball Doble A
- Founded: 1940 (86 years ago)
- President: José D. Quiles Rosas
- No. of teams: 45
- Country: Puerto Rico
- Most recent champion: Los Pescadores Del Plata De Comerio (2nd Title) (2026)
- Most titles: Mulos del Valenciano de Juncos (11 Titles)
- Website: http://www.lbsdapr.org

Béisbol Doble A ("Double-A Baseball"), governed by the Federación de Béisbol Aficionado de Puerto Rico (Puerto Rico Amateur Baseball Federation), is a Puerto Rican amateur spring and summer baseball league, founded in 1940 and based in San Juan. The season normally starts in mid to late February and ends with the Carnaval de Campeones (Carnival of Champions) final in September. They play a weekend schedule (Friday, Saturday and Sunday), and their all-star game is held soon after the regular season and before the playoffs. The Pescadores del Plata de Comerio are the 2026 National Champions, their 2nd title, after 23 years.

== League structure ==
The league is composed of 45 teams grouped into 8 divisions: 3 with 5 teams (Northwest, Southwest and Southeast), and 5 with 6 teams (North, South, Metropolitan, East and Central).

== Actual 45 Teams ==
=== Central Division (6 Teams) ===
- Polluelos de Aibonito
- Proceres de Barranquitas
- Criollos de Caguas
- Toritos de Cayey
- Bravos de Cidra
- Pescadores del Plata de Comerio

=== East Division (6 Teams) ===
- Cariduros de Fajardo
- Halcones de Gurabo
- Mulos del Valenciano de Juncos
- Artesanos de Las Piedras
- Cocoteros de Loiza
- Guerrilleros de Rio Grande

=== Metropolitan Division (6 Teams) ===
- Gigantes de Carolina
- Lancheros de Cataño
- Guardianes de Dorado
- Mets de Guaynabo
- Maceteros de Vega Alta
- Melao Melao de Vega Baja

=== North Division (6 Teams) ===
- Industriales de Barceloneta
- Arenosos de Camuy
- Titanes de Florida
- Tigres de Hatillo
- Atenienses de Manatí
- Montañeses de Utuado

=== Northwest Division (5 Teams) ===
- Navegantes de Aguada
- Tiburones de Aguadilla
- Fundadores de Añasco
- Libertadores de Hormigueros
- Patrulleros de San Sebastian

=== South Division (6 Teams) ===
- Maratonistas de Coamo
- Brujos de Guayama
- Poetas de Juana Diaz
- Cachorros de Ponce
- Peces Voladores de Salinas
- Potros de Santa Isabel

=== Southeast Division (5 Teams) ===
- Grises de Humacao
- Jueyeros de Maunabo
- Leones de Patillas
- Samaritanos de San Lorenzo
- Azucareros de Yabucoa

=== Southwest Division (5 Teams) ===
- Piratas de Cabo Rojo
- Cardenales de Lajas
- Petroleros de Peñuelas
- Petateros de Sabana Grande
- Cafeteros de Yauco

== Regular-season format ==
During the regular season, normally between February and May, each team plays 20 games for a total of 450 scheduled games. In extra innings, the international runners-on-first and second base rule will apply to the offensive team. Beginning with the 2024 season, interdivisional games are scheduled as regular games.

== Playoffs ==
=== Divisional semifinals and finals ===
The first four teams in each division (32 teams) will advance to the first stage of the postseason. It will be played as follows: section semifinal (best of 5 games), section final (best of 7 games). The champion of each division (8 teams) will advance to the Carnival of Champions. Usually, these two series are played between May and June.

=== Carnival of Champions ===
To the second stage of the post-season, the 8 divisional champions advance to the Carnival of Champions. Each team will play 7 games, one with each other in a round robin series. The first 4 places advance to the National Semifinal (best of 7 games) and the two winners advance to the National Final (best of 7 games) to decide the National Champion.

== Championships by franchise (all-time) ==
Juncos is the team with the most league championships with 11, including a back-to-back (1947-48) and a three-peat (1989-90-91). Cidra follows with 9 championships, including 3 back-to backs (2005-06, 2008-09, 2012-13). Next are Juana Díaz and San Lorenzo with 6 championships each.

Other teams with back-to-back championships include Manati (1971-72) and Vega Alta (1962-63). San Lorenzo is still the only team to achieve a four-peat (1999, 2000, 01, 02).

Team	Titles	Seasons
Mulos del Valenciano de Juncos	11	1947, 1948, 1952, 1964, 1983, 1985, 1989, 1990, 1991, 2019, 2025
Bravos de Cidra	9	1977, 1998, 2005, 2006, 2008, 2009, 2012, 2013, 2016
Poetas de Juana Díaz	6	1950, 1953, 1956, 1976, 1978, 1988
Samaritanos de San Lorenzo	6	1975, 1997, 1999, 2000, 2001, 2002
Atenienses de Manatí	4	1971, 1972, 1979, 1984
Azucareros de Yabucoa	4	1980, 1994, 1995, 1996
Montañeses de Utuado (Stars)	4	1941, 1970, 2007, 2014
Toritos de Cayey (Bar Montañez)	4	1945, 1986, 2018, 2022
Cariduros de Fajardo	3	1954, 2004, 2010
Maceteros de Vega Alta	3	1960, 1962, 1963
Sultanes de Mayagüez (Las Mesas)	3	1946, 1949, 2017
Pescadores del Plata de Comerío	2	2003, 2026
Cachorros de Ponce (Cuban Stars)	2	1944, 1957
Grises de Humacao	2	1951, 2021
Guerrilleros de Río Grande	2	1961, 1968
Melao Melao de Vega Baja	2	1959, 1973
Petateros de Sabana Grande	2	1974, 1981
Titanes de Florida	2	1982, 2024
Arenosos de Camuy	1	2023
Artesanos de Las Piedras	1	2015
Bayamon	1	1967
Brujos de Guayama	1	1987
Calvert	1	1942
Jueyeros de Maunabo	1	2011
Maratonistas de Coamo (Cariduros)	1	1958
Naval Air Station	1	1943
Patrulleros de San Sebastián	1	1965
Piratas Cofresi de Ponce	1	1940
Polluelos de Aibonito	1	1966
Potros de Santa Isabel	1	1992
Proceres de Barranquitas	1	1993
Santurce	1	1955
Tiburones de Aguadilla	1	1969
