= Pedro Pagés (outfielder) =

Cuban baseball player (born 1914)

- Outfielder / First baseman
- Born: February 23, 1914; Matanzas, Cuba
- Batted: Switch Threw: Left

NNL debut
- 1939, for the New York Cubans

Last NNL appearance
- 1947, for the New York Cubans

NNL statistics
- Batting average: .225
- Home runs: 1
- Runs batted in: 24
- Stats at Baseball Reference

Teams
- New York Cubans (1939, 1947)

Career highlights and awards
- Negro World Series champion (1947)

Pedro Armando Pagés Ruiz (en: pa-haes) (born February 23, 1914, date of death unknown) was a Cuban professional baseball outfielder and first baseman. He played with the New York Cubans of the Negro leagues over two seasons, winning the 1947 Negro World Series.

He played across various levels from 1939 to 1951. In Cuba, he played with the Elefantes de Cienfuegos of the Cuban League, helping the team win its second-ever pennant in 1946. Pagés also played in the Mexican League, debuting with the Rojos del México in 1940 and later playing with the Pericos de Puebla for five seasons from 1942 to 1946.

Pagés also managed the Torices de Cartagena to two championships in the Colombian Professional Baseball League, in 1953 and 1954. He was inducted into the Cuban Exile Baseball Hall of Fame in 1997. (Note: Cuban Baseball Hall of Fame inductions between 1962 and 2007 are not formally recognized by the Baseball Federation of Cuba)
