= Colombian Professional Baseball League =

Baseball league based in Colombia

- Sport: Baseball
- Founded: 1948
- President: Pedro Salzedo Salom
- No. of teams: 5
- Country: Colombia
- Most recent champion: Caimanes de Barranquilla (15th title)
- Most titles: Caimanes de Barranquilla (15 titles)
- Broadcaster: Telecaribe
- Related competitions: Caribbean Series; Serie de las Américas
- Website: lpbcol.com.co

The Colombian Professional Baseball League (Spanish: Liga Profesional de Béisbol or LPB), is a professional baseball league based in Colombia. It is a five-team winter league that plays during the Major League Baseball offseason. In the past, the league's champion has taken part in the Caribbean Series, and currently qualifies to the Serie de las Américas.

== History ==
The history of Colombian professional baseball is commonly divided into three eras: from 1948 to 1958, from 1979 to 1988, and from 1993 to the present.

Professional baseball in Colombia has its origins in 1948, when two foreign teams — the Havana Sugar Kings of the Florida State League, and Chesterfield of the Panamanian League — played an exhibition series against the Colombian national team. Shortly thereafter, business interests in Cartagena created the country's two first professional teams: Torices of Cartagena and Indios of Cartagena. Indios would go on to be the league's most successful club in its early years, winning seven championships. The first era of Colombian professional baseball continued until the 1957–58 season, when a national currency devaluation forced it to cease operations. Attempts to organize a new league in 1958 failed to materialize, despite fan interest.

The professional league was revived in the late 1970s, and played host to some future major league stars including Cecil Fielder, Howard Johnson, and Jesse Barfield. However, Major League Baseball withdrew its support after the 1984 season, concerned about rising violence from the illegal drug trade in Colombia.

The Colombian league returned to operation in 1993 on a semi-pro basis, known as the Copa Kola Román-Davivienda, with seven brand-new teams from different departments of Colombia. In 1994, it returned to a fully professional format, with Caimanes, Vaqueros, and Rancheros returning from the previous era as well as a new team, Tigres, based in Cartagena.

The league added two teams for the 2010–11 season, both in non-traditional baseball markets in the country's central regions: Potros, based in Medellín, and Águilas, based in the capital of Bogotá. Additionally, the Toros moved from Sincelejo to Cali for economic reasons. These changes were reversed in the 2012–13 season, after Toros moved back to Sincelejo and the two expansion teams folded.

The league again added two new expansion teams for the 2019–2020 season: Gigantes de Barranquilla and Vaqueros de Montería. Vaqueros went on to become league champions in their inaugural season. They would also become the first team to represent Colombia in the Caribbean Series, after the LPB made its debut in the tournament's 2020 edition (replacing the Cuban National Series, which could appear due to visa issues).

After the outbreak of the COVID-19 pandemic, the LPB established a "bubble" format for the 2020–21 and 2021–22 seasons, with all games being played in Barranquilla. The pandemic also saw both Leones and Toros withdraw from the league. Gigantes were expected to fold after the 2021–22 season, but managed to return the next year.

For the 2022–23 season, the league announced it was considering adding an expansion team in Bolívar. This was confirmed in September, when it was announced that the expansion team would be placed in Cartagena. Getsemaní Leones de La Trinidad, founded in 1933 as an amateur team, had petitioned to join the league for over a year, but their entrance was delayed by COVID-19. However, before the start of the season, the league announced that both Getsemaní and Gigantes would not play due to financial difficulties; instead, Toros returned after a two-year absence, keeping the league at four teams. In 2023, the league announced that Leones and Gigantes would return for the 2023–24 season, bringing the number of teams back to six.

== Teams and stadiums ==
Four teams from the country's Caribbean region compete in the league.

Team	City	Stadium	Capacity	Founded
Caimanes de Barranquilla	Barranquilla, Atlántico	Estadio Édgar Rentería	12,000	1984
Toros de Sincelejo	Sincelejo, Sucre	Estadio 20 de Enero	10,000	2003 (Note: Toros did not play in the league in the 2023-24 season.)
Tigres de Cartagena	Cartagena, Bolívar	Estadio Once de Noviembre	12,000	1994
Vaqueros de Montería	Montería, Córdoba	Estadio 18 de Junio	7,300	1984

Locations of the LCBP teams

=== Former teams ===
- Leones de Barranquilla (2023-25)
- Gigantes de Barranquilla (2019–2022)
- Potros de Medellín (2010–2011)
- Águilas de Bogotá (2010–2011)
- Willard de Barranquilla (1953–1983)
- Vanytor de Barranquilla (1953–1958)
- Torices de Cartagena (1948–1988)
- Indios de Cartagena (1948–2017)

== League structure ==
The league is organized by the Colombian Professional Baseball Division (Diprobéisbol), under the auspices of the Colombian Baseball Federation. The season is played from October to January. The top four teams at the end of the regular season, a first round robin phase of 50 games per team, advance to another round-robin (12 games for every team) with the two best teams contesting a best-of-seven final series to determine the league champion.

The league was previously owned by the Renteria Foundation, an organization run by former Major League Baseball shortstop Édgar Rentería. Its president was Édinson Rentería (brother of Édgar), whose management of the league was controversial. Rentería was eventually replaced as the league's administrator by Pedro Salcedo Salom, causing a dispute that has been cited as an issue preventing Colombia's entry to the CPBC.

Players such as former Major League Baseball shortstop Orlando Cabrera have owned teams.

== International competition ==
In 2004, the Colombian Professional Baseball League was provisionally accepted into the Caribbean Professional Baseball Confederation (CPBC). However, the league was not allowed to participate in the Caribbean Series until the level of play and the quality of baseball facilities improved.

LPB first participated in the Caribbean Series in 2020, and appeared in four editions of the tournament until 2023. In the 2022 Caribbean Series, Caimanes became the first Colombian team to win the championship, defeating the Dominican Republic's Gigantes del Cibao. Despite this victory, controversy ensued when the Colombian league was again denied full membership into the Caribbean Professional Baseball Confederation (CPBC).

On April 22, 2023, it was announced that LPB would not participate in the 2024 Caribbean Series; it was dropped from the tournament along with Cuba's Elite League and Panama's PROBEIS league. The Colombian Baseball Federation said that the league refused to pay a $200,000 participation fee to enter as a guest, alleging that it had previously been promised full membership into the CPBC. Instead, the league champion was slated to participate in a new Intercontinental Series organized by the Team Rentería Foundation, to take place in Barranquilla in January 2024; however, that tournament was ultimately canceled

== Champions ==
Key
†	Champions also won the Caribbean Series that season
†	Champions also won the Latin American Series that season

Season	Champion	Record	Final Series	Runners up	Manager
1948	Indios de Cartagena	11–7	–	Filtta de Barranquilla	Juan González Cornet
1949	Filtta de Barranquilla	20–6	–	Torices de Cartagena	Rafael Alvarado
1950	Indios de Cartagena (2)	32–17	–	Cerveza Águila de Barranquilla	Juan González Cornet
1951	Filtta de Barranquilla (2)	18–12	–	Indios de Cartagena	Gil Garrido Sr.
1952	Indios de Cartagena (3)	29–13	–	Hit de Barranquilla	Juan González Cornet
1953	Torices de Cartagena	18–33	–	Willard de Barranquilla	Pedro Pagés
1953–54	Torices de Cartagena (2)	34–26	–	Indios de Cartagena	Pedro Pagés
1954–55	Willard de Barranquilla	41–24	–	Torices de Cartagena	Spud Chandler
1955–56	Indios de Cartagena (4)	33–32	–	Vanytor de Barranquilla	Gaspar del Monte
1956–57	Kola Román de Cartagena	37–29	–	Willard de Barranquilla	Frank Scalzi
1957–58	Vanytor de Barranquilla	35–25	–	Hit de Barranquilla	Ted Narleski
No professional baseball from 1958 to 1979
1979–80	Indios de Cartagena (5)	18–32	4–2	Torices de Cartagena	José Martínez
1980–81	Indios de Cartagena (6)	34–26	4–3	Olímpica de Barranquilla	Rigoberto Mendoza
1981–82	Café Universal de Barranquilla	31–25	4–2	Cerveza Águila de Barranquilla	José Martínez
1982–83	Café Universal de Barranquilla (2)	39–25	4–3	Willard de Barranquilla	José Martínez
1983–84	Cerveza Águila de Barranquilla	39–21	4–3	Torices de Cartagena	Carlos Alfonso
1984–85	Caimanes de Barranquilla	38–22	4–2	Indios de Cartagena	José Tartabull
1987–88	Indios de Cartagena (7)	29–20	4–1	Rancheros de Sincelejo	Curtis Wallace
No professional baseball from 1988 to 1993
1993–94	Phillips Atlántico	–	4–0	Pilsen Antioquia	Boris Villa
1994–95	Caimanes de Barranquilla (2)	22–14	4–2	Tigres de Cartagena	Tomás Soto
1995–96	Tigres de Cartagena	23–24	4–2	Caimanes de Barranquilla	Jolbert Cabrera
1996–97	Rancheros de Sincelejo	30–17	4–1	Cerveza Águila de Barranquilla	José Tartabull
1997–98	Caimanes de Barranquilla (3)	18–13	4–1	Indios de Cartagena	Édinson Rentería
1998–99	Caimanes de Barranquilla (4)	17–7	4–2	Indios de Cartagena	Édinson Rentería
1999–00	Vaqueros de Barranquilla	13–14	4–2	Indios de Cartagena	Noé Maduro
2000–01 season canceled due to financial concerns
2001–02	Eléctricos de Barranquilla	20–10	4–1	Caimanes de Barranquilla	Noé Maduro
2002–03	Eléctricos de Barranquilla (2)	22–14	4–1	Aguila de Cartagena	Brent Bowers
2003–04	Tigres de Cartagena (2)	16–14	4–2	Leones de Cartagena	Bill Madlock
2004–05	Tigres de Cartagena (3)	13–17	4–3	Toros de Sincelejo	Bill Madlock
2005–06	Tigres de Cartagena (4)	17–13	4–1	Caimanes de Barranquilla	Néder Horta
2006–07	Tigres de Cartagena (5)	28–26	4–0	Caimanes de Barranquilla	Néder Horta
2007–08	Caimanes de Barranquilla (5)	33–20	4–0	Indios de Cartagena	Walter Miranda
2008–09	Caimanes de Barranquilla (6)	28–25	4–3	Leones de Montería	Walter Miranda
2009–10	Caimanes de Barranquilla (7)	30–24	4–2	Leones de Montería	Boris Villa
2010–11 season canceled due to weather conditions
2011–12	Toros de Sincelejo	25–17	5–3	Leones de Montería	Néder Horta
2012–13	Caimanes de Barranquilla (8)	26–16	4–2	Tigres de Cartagena	Wilson Valera
2013–14	Tigres de Cartagena (6) ^{†}	32–9	4–1	Leones de Montería	Donaldo Méndez
2014–15	Leones de Montería ^{†}	20–22	4–1	Caimanes de Barranquilla	Luis Urueta
2015–16	Caimanes de Lorica (9)	26–16	4–2	Leones de Montería	Luis Urueta
2016–17	Leones de Montería (2)	22–19	4–2	Toros de Sincelejo	Jair Fernández
2017–18	Leones de Montería (3)	24–18	4–3	Toros de Sincelejo	Jair Fernández
2018–19	Caimanes de Barranquilla (10)	29–12	4–1	Toros de Sincelejo	Fred Ocasio
2019–20	Vaqueros de Montería (2)	21–19	4–1	Gigantes de Barranquilla	Ozney Guillén
2020–21	Caimanes de Barranquilla (11)	13–11	4–3	Vaqueros de Montería	José Mosquera
2021–22	Caimanes de Barranquilla (12) ^{†}	23–13	4–1	Vaqueros de Montería	José Mosquera
2022–23	Vaqueros de Montería (3)	27–15	4–1	Tigres de Cartagena	Ronald Ramírez
2023–24	Caimanes de Barranquilla (13)	26–15	4–1	Vaqueros de Montería	José Mosquera
2024–25	Caimanes de Barranquilla (14)	26–12	4–3	Vaqueros de Montería	José Mosquera
2025–26	Caimanes de Barranquilla (15)	19–11	4–1	Tigres de Cartagena	Jaime del Valle

== Championships by team ==
Rank	Team	Wins	Years
1	Caimanes de Barranquilla	15	1984–85, 1994–95, 1997–98, 1998–99, 2007–08, 2008–09, 2009–10, 2012–13, 2015–16, 2018–19, 2020–21, 2021–22, 2023–24, 2024–25, 2025–26
2	Indios de Cartagena	7	1948, 1950, 1952, 1955–56, 1979–80, 1980–81, 1987–88
3	Tigres de Cartagena	6	1995–96, 2003–04, 2004–05, 2005–06, 2006–07, 2013–14
4	Leones de Montería	3	2014–15, 2016–17, 2017–18
5	Filtta de Barranquilla	2	1949, 1951
5	Willard de Barranquilla	2	1953, 1954–55
5	Café Universal de Barranquilla	2	1981–82, 1982–83
5	Eléctricos de Barranquilla	2	2001–02, 2002–03
5	Vaqueros de Montería	2	2019-20, 2022–23
9	Torices de Cartagena	1	1953–54
9	Rancheros de Sincelejo	1	1996–97
9	Kola Román de Cartagena	1	1956–57
9	Vanytor de Barranquilla	1	1957–58
9	Cerveza Águila de Barranquilla	1	1983–84
9	Vaqueros de Barranquilla	1	1999–00
9	Toros de Sincelejo	1	2011–12
9	Phillips-Atlántico	1	1993–94
