= Vaqueros de Montería =

Colombian baseball team

Logo
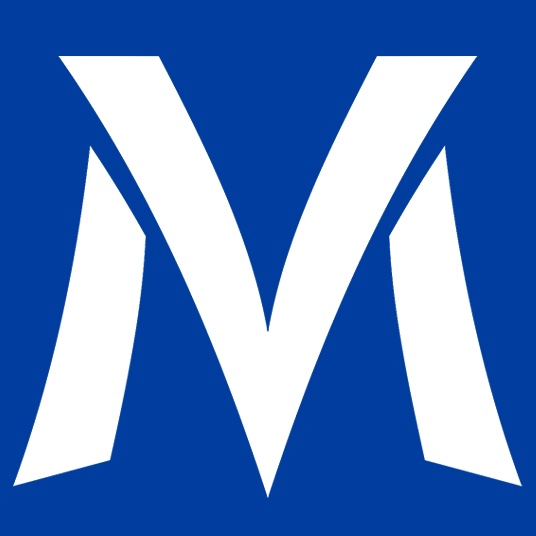
Cap insignia

Information
- League: Colombian Professional Baseball League
- Location: Montería, Colombia
- Ballpark: Estadio 18 de Junio
- Founded: 1984 (original); 2019 (modern)
- League championships: 3 (1999–2000, (Note: As Vaqueros de Barranquilla, a separate entity from the modern Vaqueros team) 2019-20, 2022-23)
- Colors: Blue, White
- President: (Colombia) Hector Cordero Hoyos
- Manager: (Venezuela) José Tábata

Current uniforms
Home	Away

The Vaqueros de Montería (Spanish pronunciation: [baˈkeɾos de monteˈɾi.a]; Montería Cowboys) are a baseball team in the Colombian Professional Baseball League (LPB), playing in the Caribbean city of Montería, Córdoba. The modern incarnation of the team was founded in 2019 and won the league championship in its inaugural season; it was also the first Colombian team to be invited to the Caribbean Series. Vaqueros also won the LPB championship in the 2022–23 season, defeating Tigres de Cartagena.

The team traces its lineage to the original Vaqueros formed in 1984, which played eight seasons in Montería (sponsored by Kola Román) before relocating to Barranquilla before the 1999–2000 season.

== International competition ==
=== Caribbean Series ===
Year	Venue	Finish	Wins	Losses	Win%	Manager
2020	(Puerto Rico) San Juan	6th	0	5	.000	(Venezuela) Ozney Guillén
2023	(Venezuela) Caracas and La Guaira	4th	4	5	.444	(Colombia) Ronald Ramírez
Total			4	10	.286	

2023 Caribbean Series roster

Vaqueros de Montería roster – 2023 Caribbean Series
Players		Coaches
Pitchers: (Colombia) Carlos Díaz; (Colombia) Kevin Escorcia; (Colombia) Hernando Mejía; (Colombia) Hugo Beltrán; (Venezuela) Julio Vivas; (Dominican Republic) Francisco López; (Dominican Republic) Francisco Jimenez; (Dominican Republic) Samuel Burgos; (Dominican Republic) Eduar López; (Colombia) Randy Consuegra; (Venezuela) Carlos Quevedo; (Dominican Republic) Oscar Marcelino; (Colombia) Victor Vargas; (Dominican Republic) Yelmison Peralta; (Colombia) Jhon Peluffo	Catchers: (Colombia) Daniel Vellojín; (Venezuela) Pabel Manzanero; (Colombia) Andrés Angulo; Infielders: (Colombia) Fabián Pertuz; (Colombia) Reynaldo Rodríguez; (Colombia) Francisco Acuña; (Colombia) Dilson Herrera; (Colombia) Dayan Frías; Outfielders: (Colombia) Derwin Pomare; (Colombia) Gustavo Campero; (Colombia) Jesus Marriaga; (Colombia) Brayan Buelvas	Manager: (Colombia) Ronald Ramírez (Caribbean Series only)
